= 1992–93 Maine Black Bears men's ice hockey season =

National champion Great Alaska Faceoff, champion Great Western Freeze-Out, champion Dexter Hockey Classic, champion Hockey East, champion Hockey East Tournament, champion NCAA Tournament, champion
- Conference: 1st Hockey East
- Home ice: Alfond Arena

Rankings
- USA Today: 1

Record
- Overall: 42–1–2
- Conference: 22–1–1
- Home: 17–1–2
- Road: 12–0–0
- Neutral: 15–0–0

Coaches and captains
- Head coach: Shawn Walsh
- Assistant coaches: Grant Standbrook; Red Gendron
- Captain: Jim Montgomery
- Alternate captain: Dan Murphy

The 1992–93 Maine Black Bears Men's ice hockey season was the 16th season of play for the program, the 14th season competing at the Division I level, and the 9th season in the Hockey East conference. The Black Bears represented the University of Maine and played their home games at Alfond Arena, and were coached by Shawn Walsh, in his 9th season as their head coach. Led by freshman phenom and future Hockey Hall of Famer Paul Kariya, the Black Bears compiled an unprecedented record of 42–1–2, dominating the competition on the way to winning the national championship, the first in school history.

== Personnel ==
Head Coach: Shawn Walsh, 9th season

== Roster ==
No.	Nat.	Player	Class	Pos	Height	Weight	DoB	Hometown	Previous team	NHL rights
1		Mike Dunham	Junior	G	6' 2" (1.88 m)	201 lb (91 kg)		Johnson City, New York	Canterbury School (USHS–NY)	NJD, 53 overall 1990
2		Andy Silverman	Sophomore	D	6' 3" (1.91 m)	191 lb (87 kg)		Beverly, Massachusetts		NYR, 181 overall 1990
3		Matt Martin	Junior	D	6' 3" (1.91 m)	191 lb (87 kg)		Hamden, Connecticut	Avon Old Farms School (USHS-Prep)	TOR, 66 overall 1989
4		Chris Imes	Junior	D	5' 10" (1.78 m)	187 lb (85 kg)		Birchdale, Minnesota		—
5		Jacque Rodrigue	Sophomore	D	6' 0" (1.83 m)	190 lb (86 kg)		Nashua, New Hampshire	North Iowa Huskies (USHL)	—
6		Jason Weinrich	Junior	D	6' 3" (1.91 m)	220 lb (100 kg)		Lewiston, Maine		NYR, 118 overall 1990
9		Paul Kariya	Freshman	F	5' 10" (1.78 m)	181 lb (82 kg)		Vancouver, British Columbia	Penticton Panthers (BCJHL)	ANA, 4 overall 1993
10		Mike Latendresse	Sophomore	F	5' 10" (1.78 m)	160 lb (73 kg)		Montreal, Quebec	Montreal Olympics (QPJHL)	—
11		Dan Murphy (A)	Senior	D	6' 1" (1.85 m)	185 lb (84 kg)		New Haven, Connecticut	The Gunnery Prep	—
12		Wayne Conlan	Sophomore	F	5' 10" (1.78 m)	170 lb (77 kg)		West Haven, Connecticut		STL, 138 overall 1990
13		Dave MacIsaac	Sophomore	D	6' 1" (1.85 m)	220 lb (100 kg)		Cambridge, Massachusetts		—
14		Dave LaCouture	Senior	F	6' 3" (1.91 m)	205 lb (93 kg)		Natick, Massachusetts		STL, 105 overall 1988
15		Chris Ferraro	Freshman	F	5' 11" (1.8 m)	176 lb (80 kg)		Port Jefferson, New York	Waterloo Black Hawks (USHL)	NYR, 85 overall 1992
16		Patrice Tardif	Junior	F	6' 1" (1.85 m)	203 lb (92 kg)		St. Methode, Quebec		STL, 54 overall 1990
17		Peter Ferraro	Freshman	F	5' 11" (1.8 m)	181 lb (82 kg)		Port Jefferson, New York	Waterloo Black Hawks (USHL)	NYR, 24 overall 1992
18		Eric Fenton	Senior	F	6' 2" (1.88 m)	190 lb (86 kg)		Troy, New York		NYR, 202 overall 1988
19		Jim Montgomery (C)	Senior	F	5' 10" (1.78 m)	183 lb (83 kg)		Montreal, Quebec	Pembroke Lumber Kings (CJHL)	—
20		Brad Purdie	Freshman	F	5' 10" (1.78 m)	187 lb (85 kg)		Dollard-des-Ormeaux, Quebec		—
22		Kent Salfi	Senior	F	5' 10" (1.78 m)	180 lb (82 kg)		Clifton Park, New York		—
24		Lee Saunders	Junior	D	5' 11" (1.8 m)	176 lb (80 kg)		South Shields, England	Nanaimo Clippers (BCJHL)	—
25		Justin Tomberlin	Junior	F	6' 1" (1.85 m)	194 lb (88 kg)		Grand Rapids, Minnesota	Greenway High (USHS–MN)	TOR, 192 overall 1989
26		Chuck Texeria	Junior	F	6' 1" (1.85 m)	194 lb (88 kg)		Easton, Massachusetts		—
27		Martin Mercier	Senior	F	5' 9" (1.75 m)	194 lb (88 kg)		Montreal, Quebec		—
30		Garth Snow	Senior	G	6' 3" (1.91 m)	201 lb (91 kg)		Wrentham, Massachusetts	Stanford Cullitons (MWJHL)	QUE, 114 overall 1987
31		Cal Ingraham	Junior	F	5' 5" (1.65 m)	161 lb (73 kg)		Georgetown, Massachusetts	Air Force (NCAA)	—
33		Greg Hirsch	Freshman	G				Chelmsford, Massachusetts		—

== Standings ==
1992–93 Hockey East standings
	Conference							Overall					
	GP	W	L	T	PTS	GF	GA	GP	W	L	T	GF	GA
Maine†*	24	22	1	1	45	162	56	45	42	1	2	272	107
Boston University	24	18	5	1	37	126	84	40	29	9	2	193	126
New Hampshire	24	11	11	2	24	102	99	38	18	17	3	158	143
Massachusetts–Lowell	24	10	13	1	21	100	100	39	20	17	2	158	151
Providence	24	9	12	3	21	91	109	36	16	16	4	149	147
Merrimack	24	8	16	0	16	85	141	36	14	20	2	135	184
Boston College	24	6	15	3	15	80	120	38	9	24	5	117	187
Northeastern	24	6	17	1	13	89	127	35	10	24	1	137	193
Championship: Maine † indicates conference regular season champion * indicates conference tournament champion

== Schedule and results ==
Date	Opponent^{#}	Rank^{#}	Site	Result	Record
Regular season
October 23	Providence		Alfond Arena • Orono, Maine	W 9–3	1–0–0 (1–0–0)
October 24	Providence		Alfond Arena • Orono, Maine	T 4–4	1–0–1 (1–0–1)
October 30	New Brunswick*		Alfond Arena • Orono, Maine	W 9–2	2–0–1 (1–0–1)
October 31	New Brunswick*		Alfond Arena • Orono, Maine	W 11–1	3–0–1 (1–0–1)
November 7	at Providence		Schneider Arena • Providence, Rhode Island	W 6–2	4–0–1 (2–0–1)
November 13	Merrimack		Alfond Arena • Orono, Maine	W 14–1	5–0–1 (3–0–1)
November 14	Merrimack		Alfond Arena • Orono, Maine	W 11–2	6–0–1 (4–0–1)
November 20	at Boston University		Walter Brown Arena • Boston, Massachusetts	W 4–3	7–0–1 (5–0–1)
November 21	at Boston University		Walter Brown Arena • Boston, Massachusetts	W 6–3	8–0–1 (6–0–1)
November 26	vs. Yale*		Carlson Center • Fairbanks, Alaska (Great Alaska Faceoff)	W 3–1	9–0–1 (6–0–1)
November 27	vs. Bowling Green*		Carlson Center • Fairbanks, Alaska (Great Alaska Faceoff)	W 8–1	10–0–1 (6–0–1)
November 28	at Alaska–Fairbanks*		Carlson Center • Fairbanks, Alaska (Great Alaska Faceoff)	W 6–4	11–0–1 (6–0–1)
December 4	Northeastern		Alfond Arena • Orono, Maine	W 5–4	12–0–1 (7–0–1)
December 5	Northeastern		Alfond Arena • Orono, Maine	W 11–2	13–0–1 (8–0–1)
December 11	vs. New Hampshire*		Cumberland County Civic Center • Portland, Maine	W 4–3	14–0–1 (8–0–1)
December 12	at Massachusetts–Lowell		Tully Forum • Billerica, Massachusetts	W 6–3	15–0–1 (9–0–1)
December 19	vs. Western Michigan*		Great Western Forum • Inglewood, California (Great Western Freeze Out Semifinal)	W 4–1	16–0–1 (9–0–1)
December 20	vs. Lake Superior State*		Great Western Forum • Inglewood, California (Great Western Freeze-Out Championship)	W 3–2	17–0–1 (9–0–1)
December 29	vs. Ohio State*		Richfield Coliseum • Cleveland, Ohio (Cleveland Hockey Classic Semifinal)	W 9–4	18–0–1 (9–0–1)
December 30	vs. Bowling Green*		Richfield Coliseum • Cleveland, Ohio (Cleveland Hockey Classic Championship)	W 6–2	19-0-1 (9–0–1)
January 2	Miami*		Alfond Arena • Orono, Maine (Dexter Hockey Classic Semifinal)	W 3–1	20–0–1 (9–0–1)
January 3	Brown*		Alfond Arena • Orono, Maine (Dexter Hockey Classic Championship)	W 12–4	21–0–1 (9–0–1)
January 15	Clarkson*		Alfond Arena • Orono, Maine	T 4–4	21–0–2 (9–0–1)
January 16	Clarkson*		Alfond Arena • Orono, Maine	W 6–0	22–0–2 (9–0–1)
January 22	at Boston College		Conte Forum • Chestnut Hill, Massachusetts	W 8–1	23–0–2 (10–0–1)
January 24	at Boston College		Conte Forum • Chestnut Hill, Massachusetts	W 4–1	24–0–2 (11–0–1)
January 29	at New Hampshire		Snively Arena • Durham, New Hampshire	W 5–2	25–0–2 (12–0–1)
January 30	at New Hampshire		Snively Arena • Durham, New Hampshire	W 8–3	26–0–2 (13–0–1)
February 5	Massachusetts–Lowell		Alfond Arena • Orono, Maine	W 7–4	27–0–2 (14–0–1)
February 6	Massachusetts–Lowell		Alfond Arena • Orono, Maine	W 4–2	28–0–2 (15–0–1)
February 12	at Northeastern		Matthews Arena • Boston, Massachusetts	W 7–1	29–0–2 (16–0–1)
February 13	at Northeastern		Matthews Arena • Boston, Massachusetts	W 6–2	30–0–2 (17–0–1)
February 19	Boston University		Alfond Arena • Orono, Maine	L 6–7 ^{OT}	30–1–2 (17–1–1)
February 20	Boston University		Alfond Arena • Orono, Maine	W 6–1	31–1–2 (18–1–1)
February 26	at Merrimack		J. Thom Lawler Rink • North Andover, Massachusetts	W 4–2	32–1–2 (19–1–1)
February 27	at Merrimack		J. Thom Lawler Rink • North Andover, Massachusetts	W 8–1	33–1–2 (20–1–1)
March 2	Boston College		Alfond Arena • Orono, Maine	W 9–1	34–1–2 (21–1–1)
March 6	New Hampshire		Alfond Arena • Orono, Maine	W 5–2	35–1–2 (22–1–1)
Hockey East Tournament
March 12	Northeastern		Alfond Arena • Orono, Maine	W 6–1	36–1–2 (22–1–1)
March 14	Northeastern		Alfond Arena • Orono, Maine	W 9–5	37–1–2 (22–1–1)
March 19	vs. Massachusetts–Lowell		Boston Garden • Boston, Massachusetts	W 7–5	38–1–2 (22–1–1)
March 20	vs. Boston University		Boston Garden • Boston, Massachusetts	W 5–2	39–1–2 (22–1–1)
NCAA Tournament
March 27	vs. Minnesota*		Worcester Centrum • Worcester, Massachusetts (NCAA regional semifinals)	W 6–2	40–1–2 (22–1–1)
April 1	vs. Michigan*		Bradley Center • Milwaukee, Wisconsin (National semifinal)	W 4–3 ^{OT}	41–1–2 (22–1–1)
April 3	vs. Lake Superior State*		Bradley Center • Milwaukee, Wisconsin (National championship)	W 5–4	42–1–2 (22–1–1)
*Non-conference game. ^{#}Rankings from USCHO.com Poll. All times are in Eastern Time.

== Scoring statistics ==
Name	Games	Goals	Assists	Pts	PIM
Paul Kariya	39	25	75	100	12
Jim Montgomery	45	32	63	95	40
Cal Ingraham	45	46	39	85	50
Chris Ferraro	39	25	26	51	46
Mike Latendresse	40	21	30	51	22
Peter Ferraro	36	18	32	50	106
Patrice Tardif	45	23	25	48	22
Dave MacIssac	35	5	32	37	14
Eric Fenton	31	21	15	36	76
Chris Imes	45	12	23	35	24
Matt Martin	44	6	26	32	88
Kent Salfi	33	10	13	23	24
Justin Tomberlin	34	13	9	22	22
Martin Mercier	39	11	8	19	23
Lee Saunders	42	7	12	19	40
Dave LaCouture	43	8	6	14	78
Dan Murphy	44	0	11	11	56
Brad Purdie	20	3	7	10	14
Jason Weinrich	38	1	8	9	42
Andy Silverman	37	1	7	10	56
Jamie Thompson	16	3	1	4	10
Chuck Texeira	13	1	3	4	16
Wayne Conlan	3	0	3	3	0
Garth Snow	23	0	3	3	6
Jacques Rodrigue	2	0	2	2	2
Mike Dunham	25	0	2	2	0
Greg Hirsch	11	0	0	0	0
Total					

== Goaltending statistics ==
Name	Games	Minutes	Wins	Losses	Ties	Goals against	Saves	Shut outs	SV %	GAA
Garth Snow	23	1210	21	0	1	42	452	1	.915	2.08
Greg Hirsch	11	73	0	0	0	3	–	0	–	2.46
Mike Dunham	25	1429	21	1	1	63	526	0	.893	2.65
Total	45	–	42	1	2	107	–	1	–	–

== 1993 national championship ==
=== (E1) Maine vs. (W1) Lake Superior State ===
April 3	Maine	5 – 4	Lake Superior State	Bradley Center

Scoring summary
Period	Team	Goal	Assist(s)	Time	Score
1st	Maine	Patrice Tardif	Latendresse	0:28	1–0 Maine
1st	Maine	Chris Ferraro	Imes and Ferraro	7:10	2–0 Maine
1st	LSSU	Mike Bachusz	Angelelli and Ness	17:02	2–1 Maine
2nd	LSSU	Clayton Beddoes	unassisted	27:01	2–2
2nd	LSSU	John Hendry	Beddoes	35:46	3–2 LSSU
2nd	LSSU	Wayne Strachan	Hulett	38:42	4–2 LSSU
3rd	Maine	Jim Montgomery	Kariya	44:19	4–3 LSSU
3rd	Maine	Jim Montgomery	Kariya and Imes	47:40	4–4
3rd	Maine	Jim Montgomery – GW	Kariya	48:54	5–4 Maine

Goaltenders
Team	Name	Saves	Goals against	Time on ice
LSSU	Blaine Lacher	24	5	
Maine	Mike Dunham	8	4	
Maine	Garth Snow	8	0	

== Players drafted into the NHL ==
=== 1993 NHL entry draft ===
= NHL All-Star team	= NHL All-Star	= NHL All-Star and NHL All-Star team	= Hall of Famers	= Did not play in the NHL

Round	Pick	Player	NHL team
1	4	Paul Kariya	Anaheim Mighty Ducks
4	84	Trevor Roenick †	Hartford Whalers

† incoming freshman

=== 1993 NHL supplemental draft ===
Pick	Player	NHL team
4	Chris Imes	Florida Panthers
