= Umile =

Umile is a surname. Notable people with the surname include:

- Bruno Umile (born 2003), Italian footballer
- Dick Umile (born 1948), American ice hockey coach

== See also ==
- Fra Umile da Foligno (fl. late 17th-century), Italian Franciscan friar
