= 1993 NCAA Division I men's ice hockey tournament =

- Teams: 12
- Finals site: Bradley Center, Milwaukee
- Champions: Maine Black Bears (1st title)
- Runner-up: Lake Superior State Lakers (3rd title game)
- Semifinalists: Michigan Wolverines (15th Frozen Four); Boston University Terriers (16th Frozen Four)
- Winning coach: Shawn Walsh (1st title)
- MOP: Jim Montgomery (Maine)
- Attendance: 80,433

The 1993 NCAA Division I men's ice hockey tournament involved 12 schools playing in single-elimination play to determine the national champion of men's NCAA Division I college ice hockey. It began on March 26, 1993, and ended with the championship game on April 3. A total of 11 games were played.

This would be the first tournament where 20-minute, sudden-death overtime periods were played if a game was tied after regulation. All previous tournaments between 1954 (Note: The 1948 tournament utilized a full 10-minute overtime period. The next overtime game didn't occur until 1954, which was the first sudden-death overtime game in the NCAA tournament.) and 1992 utilized 10-minute, sudden-death overtime periods.

== Qualifying teams ==
The at-large bids and seeding for each team in the tournament were announced after the conference tournaments concluded. The Western Collegiate Hockey Association (WCHA) had four teams receive a berth, the Central Collegiate Hockey Association (CCHA) and the ECAC each had three teams receive a berth in the tournament while the Hockey East had two berths.

East Regional – Worcester							West Regional – Detroit						
Seed	School	Conference	Record	Berth type	Appearance	Last bid	Seed	School	Conference	Record	Berth type	Appearance	Last bid
1	Maine	Hockey East	39–1–2	Tournament champion	7th	1992	1	Lake Superior State	CCHA	30–7–5	Tournament champion	7th	1992
2	Boston University	Hockey East	28–8–2	At-large bid	19th	1992	2	Michigan	CCHA	29–6–3	At-large bid	16th	1992
3	Harvard	ECAC	22–5–3	At-large bid	15th	1989	3	Miami	CCHA	27–8–5	At-large bid	1st	Never
4	Clarkson	ECAC	20–9–5	Tournament champion	13th	1992	4	Minnesota-Duluth	WCHA	26–10–2	At-large bid	4th	1985
5	Minnesota	WCHA	21–11–8	Tournament champion	20th	1992	5	Brown	ECAC	16–11–3	At-large bid	4th	1976
6	Northern Michigan	WCHA	20–17–4	At-large bid	6th	1992	6	Wisconsin	WCHA	23–14–3	At-large bid	14th	1992

== Game locations ==
- East Regional – Centrum in Worcester, Worcester, Massachusetts
- West Regional – Joe Louis Arena, Detroit
- Frozen Four – Bradley Center, Milwaukee

== Bracket ==
First Round; March 26
E4	Clarkson	1
E5	Minnesota	2
W3	Miami	1
W6	Wisconsin	3
E3	Harvard	2
E6	Northern Michigan	3**
W4	Minnesota–Duluth	7
W5	Brown	3

Quarterfinals; March 27
E1	Maine	6
E5	Minnesota	2
W2	Michigan	4*
W6	Wisconsin	3
E2	Boston University	4
E6	Northern Michigan	1
W1	Lake Superior State	4
W4	Minnesota–Duluth	3

National Semifinals; April 1
E1	Maine	4*
W2	Michigan	3
E2	Boston University	1
W1	Lake Superior State	6

National Championship; April 3
E1	Maine	5
W1	Lake Superior State	4

Note: * denotes overtime period(s)

== Results ==
=== East Regional – Worcester, Massachusetts ===
==== First Round ====
March 26, 1993; 5:30 pm	(3) Harvard	2–3 (2OT) (1–2, 1–0, 0–0, 0–0, 0–1)	(6) Northern Michigan	Centrum in Worcester; Attendance: 9,683

Game reference

Tripp Tracy
Goalies
Paul Taylor

(Mallgrave, Drury) Chris Baird – PP – 06:34	1 – 0
	1 – 1	12:03 – Scott Green (Harding, Huettl)
	1 – 2	19:56 – PP – Bryan Ganz (Simpson, Frederick)
(Body, Flomenhoft) Steve Martins – PP – 27:30	2 – 2
	2 – 3	82:43 – GW PP – Mike Harding (Frederick)

18 min
Penalties
16 min
36
Shots
36

March 26, 1993; 8:30 pm	(4) Clarkson	1–2 (1–1, 0–0, 0–1)	(5) Minnesota	Centrum in Worcester; Attendance: 9,683

Game reference

Chris Rogles
Goalies
Tom Newman
Referees:
Frank Cole
John Gravellese

	0 – 1	08:24 – PP – Tony Bianchi (Richards)
(Bélanger, Marchant) Marko Tuomainen – 09:31	1 – 1
	1 – 2	42:47 – GW – Craig Johnson (Hendrickson, Bell)

4 min
Penalties
6 min
29
Shots
32

==== Quarterfinals ====
March 27, 1993; 8:30 pm	(1) Maine	6–2 (2–0, 2–1, 2–1)	(5) Minnesota	Centrum in Worcester; Attendance: 12,045

Game reference

(59:48 TOI) Mike Dunham
(00:12 TOI) Greg Hirsch
Goalies
Jeff Callinan (59:21 TOI)
Tom Newman (00:39 TOI)
Referees:
John Gallagher
Mike Noeth
Linesman:
Thomas DiFusco

(Kariya, Ingraham) Jim Montgomery – PP – 04:54	1 – 0
(Ingraham) Chris Imes – PP – 07:18	2 – 0
	2 – 1	23:13 – Andy Brink (McHugh)
(Kariya, Ingraham) Jim Montgomery – GW – 31:06	3 – 1
(Montgomery) Paul Kariya – SH – 33:30	4 – 1
(Montgomery) Matt Martin – PP – 45:17	5 – 1
	5 – 2	48:02 – PP – Scott Bell (Hendrickson, Means)
(Martin, Montgomery) Justin Tomberlin – PP – 55:06	6 – 2

24 min
Penalties
20 min
30
Shots
33

March 27, 1993; 5:30 pm	(2) Boston University	4–1 (2–0, 1–1, 1–0)	(6) Northern Michigan	Centrum in Worcester

Game reference

Derek Herlofsky
Goalies
Paul Taylor

(Pomichter, Sacco) Mike Bavis – 00:49	1 – 0
(Linna, Pandolfo) Steve Thornton – GW – 19:37	2 – 0
(Linna, Prendergast) David Sacco – 22:58	3 – 0
	3 – 1	34:05 – SH – Greg Hadden (Frederick)
(unassisted) Jay Pandolfo – EN – 59:45	4 – 1

39
Shots
28

=== West Regional – Detroit, Michigan ===
==== First Round ====
March 26, 1993; 5:00 pm	(3) Miami	1–3 (0–2, 1–0, 0–1)	(6) Wisconsin	Joe Lewis Arena; Attendance: 2,442

Game reference

Richard Shulmistra
Goalies
Jim Carey

	0 – 1	05:47 – Jason Francisco (Tucker, Tok)
	0 – 2	15:23 – GW PP – Dan Plante (Richter)
(Backen, Adams) Stephen Rohr – PP – 33:09	1 – 2
	1 – 3	59:36 – EN – Jamie Spencer (Tok)

6 min
Penalties
6 min
26
Shots
27

March 26, 1993; 8:30 pm	(4) Minnesota–Duluth	7–3 (3–3, 1–0, 3–0)	(5) Brown	Joe Lewis Arena; Attendance: 2,442

Game reference

Taras Lendzyk
Goalies
Geoff Finch
Referees:
Rich Fowkes
Steve McBride
Linesman:
John Jones

(Sittlow, Aldoff) Brian Caruso – 01:43	1 – 0
(Miller) Derek Plante – 03:14	2 – 0
	2 – 1	08:15 – Scott Hanley (Thompson)
(Sittlow) Brett Hauer – 08:47	3 – 1
	3 – 2	18:52 – PP – Jamie O'Brien (Jones, Fabbro)
	3 – 3	19:52 – PP – Mark Fabbro (Chauvette)
(Hauer, Plante) Chris Marinucci – GW PP – 38:31	4 – 3
(Sittlow) Brian Caruso – 48:16	5 – 3
(Biondi, Parrott) Corey Osmak – PP – 54:04	6 – 3
(Plante) Corey Osmak – 56:47	7 – 3

12 min
Penalties
8 min
29
Shots
29

==== Quarterfinals ====
March 27, 1993; 8:30 pm	(1) Lake Superior State	4–3 (1–1, 2–0, 1–2)	(4) Minnesota–Duluth	Joe Lewis Arena; Attendance: 7,483

Game reference

Blaine Lacher
Goalies
Taras Lendzyk
Referees:
Harry Ammian
Rob Hearn
Linesman:
Joel Dupree

	0 – 1	07:49 – Rusty Fitzgerald (Marinucci, Plante)
(Strachan, Hulett) Kurt Miller – 14:49	1 – 1
(Morin, Tallaire) Brian Rolston – 25:11	2 – 1
(Morin, Tallaire) Brian Rolston – 26:10	3 – 1
	3 – 2	44:53 – PP – Brett Hauer (Plante, Lendzyk)
(Hulett, K. Miller) Wayne Strachan – GW – 46:20	4 – 2
	4 – 3	56:26 – Derek Plante (Fitzgerald)

14 min
Penalties
25 min
37
Shots
30

March 27, 1993; 5:00 pm	(2) Michigan	4–3 (OT) (1–0, 0–1, 2–2, 1–0)	(6) Wisconsin	Joe Lewis Arena; Attendance: 7,483

Game reference

Steve Shields
Goalies
Jim Carey
Referees:
Steve McBride
Rich Fowkes
Linesman:
John Jones

(Neaton, Roberts) David Oliver – PP – 10:57	1 – 0
	1 – 1	21:45 – Blaine Moore (Shier, Katlaps)
	1 – 2	46:31 – Max Williams (Granato, Francisco)
(Stone, Knuble) Rick Willis – 51:05	2 – 2
	2 – 3	54:07 – Chris Tok (Shier, Rafalski)
(Wiseman, Oliver) Cam Stewart – 56:13	3 – 3
(unassisted) David Roberts – GW – 61:35	4 – 3

6 min
Penalties
8 min
33
Shots
29

=== Frozen Four – Milwaukee, Wisconsin ===
==== National Semifinals ====
April 1, 1993; 1:30 pm	(E1) Maine	4–3 (OT) (1–2, 1–1, 1–0, 1–0)	(W2) Michigan	Bradley Center; Attendance: 17,403

Game reference

Garth Snow
Goalies
Steve Shields
Referees:
Rob Hearn
Harry Ammian
Linesman:
Joel Dupree

	0 – 1	03:58 – David Oliver (Wiseman)
	0 – 2	04:25 – David Roberts (unassisted)
(unassisted) Cal Ingraham – 09:55	1 – 2
(Kariya) Matt Martin – PP – 22:30	2 – 2
	2 – 3	27:54 – PP – Aaron Ward (Stewart, Oliver)
(Montgomery) Cal Ingraham – 55:57	3 – 3
(Latendresse, Silverman) Lee Saunders – GW – 61:36	4 – 3

10 min
Penalties
10 min
35
Shots
18

April 1, 1993; 7:00 pm	(W1) Lake Superior State	6–1 (2–0, 2–1, 2–0)	(E2) Boston University	Bradley Center; Attendance: 17,444

Game reference

Blaine Lacher
Goalies
Derek Herlofsky
Referees:
Greg Shepherd
Brien Ricci
Linesman:
John Elvy

(Hulett, Smith) Kurt Miller – 06:33	1 – 0
(Miller, Hulett) Wayne Strachan – GW – 16:17	2 – 0
	2 – 1	28:46 – PP – Doug Friedman (Linna, Sacco)
(Valicevic, Tallaire) Brian Rolston – PP – 33:45	3 – 1
(Valicevic, Rolston) Sean Tallaire – PP – 34:24	4 – 1
(Valicevic, Barnes) Clayton Beddoes – 51:06	5 – 1
(Talliere) Brian Rolston – 59:19	6 – 1

14 min
Penalties
22 min
28
Shots
24

==== National Championship ====
April 3, 1993; 7:00 pm	(E1) Maine	5–4 (2–1, 0–3, 3–0)	(W1) Lake Superior State	Bradley Center; Attendance: 17,704

Game reference
Referees: Harry Ammian; Rob Hearn; Linesman: Joel Dupree

Scoring summary
Period	Team	Goal	Assist(s)	Time	Score
1st	Maine	Patrice Tardif	Latendresse	0:28	1–0 Maine
1st	Maine	Chris Ferraro	Imes and Ferraro	7:10	2–0 Maine
1st	LSSU	Mike Bachusz	Angelelli and Ness	17:02	2–1 Maine
2nd	LSSU	Clayton Beddoes – PP	unassisted	27:01	2–2
2nd	LSSU	John Hendry	Beddoes	35:46	3–2 LSSU
2nd	LSSU	Wayne Strachan	Hulett	38:42	4–2 LSSU
3rd	Maine	Jim Montgomery	Kariya	44:19	4–3 LSSU
3rd	Maine	Jim Montgomery	Kariya and Imes	47:40	4–4
3rd	Maine	Jim Montgomery – PP GW	Kariya	48:54	5–4 Maine
Penalty summary
Period	Team	Player	Penalty	Time	PIM
1st	LSSU	Rob Valicevic	Slashing	10:35	2:00
1st	Maine	Matt Martin	Hooking	10:35	2:00
1st	LSSU	Brian Rolston	Cross-checking	14:20	2:00
1st	Maine	Jim Montgomery	Roughing	14:20	2:00
1st	LSSU	Brian Rolston	High-sticking	17:47	2:00
2nd	LSSU	Dean Hulett	Tripping	23:47	2:00
2nd	Maine	Eric Fenton	Hooking	26:14	2:00
2nd	Maine	Martin Mercier	Tripping	30:54	2:00
3rd
3rd	LSSU	Tim Hanley	Tripping	48:12	2:00
3rd	Maine	Eric Fenton	Roughing	55:17	2:00
3rd	LSSU	Brian Rolston	Roughing	55:17	2:00

Shots by period
Team	1	2	3	Total
Lake Superior State	5	7	8	20
Maine	9	10	5	24

Goaltenders
Team	Name	Saves	Goals against	Time on ice
LSSU	Blaine Lacher	24	5	
Maine	Mike Dunham	8	4	40:00
Maine	Garth Snow	8	0	20:00

== All-Tournament team ==
- G: Garth Snow (Maine)
- D: Chris Imes (Maine)
- D: Michael Smith (Lake Superior State)
- F: Paul Kariya (Maine)
- F: Jim Montgomery* (Maine)
- F: Brian Rolston (Lake Superior State)

* Most Outstanding Player(s)

== Record by conference ==
Conference	# of Bids	Record	Win %	Regional semifinals	Frozen Four	Championship Game	Champions
WCHA	4	4-4	.500	4	-	-	-
CCHA	3	3-3	.500	2	2	1	-
ECAC	3	0-3	.000	-	-	-	-
Hockey East	2	4-1	.800	2	2	1	1
