= Cal Ingraham =

American ice hockey player

- Born: June 4, 1970 (age 56) Georgetown, Massachusetts, USA
- Height: 5 ft 5 in (165 cm)
- Weight: 165 lb (75 kg; 11 st 11 lb)
- Position: Right wing
- Shot: Right
- Played for: Air Force; Maine; Tallahassee Tiger Sharks; Idaho Steelheads
- Playing career: 1989–2002

Cal Ingraham is an American retired ice hockey coach and right wing who was an All-American for Maine and helped the program win its first National Championship in 1993.

== Career ==
Ingraham began attending the Air Force Academy in the fall of 1989. His career path changed after he was able to score more than a point per game as a freshman and he transferred after the season. He sat out for the required scholastic year and appeared in his first game for Maine in the fall of 1991. He played well for a very strong Black Bears squad but the team faltered once they got into the NCAA Tournament, losing their first game to Michigan State.

Everything changed when the team added Paul Kariya for the following season. Ingraham teamed with the future Hall of famer on the top line along with Jim Montgomery and got Maine to produce one of the most overpowering campaigns in NCAA history. The Black Bears won just about everything in 1993, finishing the year with an NCAA record 42 wins and losing just a single game. Ingraham led the nation with 46 goals, finishing 4th overall in scoring and was one of five All-Americans on the team. After winning the national championship, Ingraham returned for his senior season, serving as team captain after Kariya left to pursue a professional career. Predictably the team was a bit flat but things got worse when Maine was forced to forfeit 14 games for using an ineligible player. Maine finished dead-last in their conference as a result and ended the season by getting swept in the Hockey East quarterfinals.

After graduating, Ingraham took a year off before returning to the game. He instantly became a major point producer for the Tallahassee Tiger Sharks, becoming the all-time leading scorer for the now-defunct franchise. He played three seasons with the team but didn't receive any interest from higher-level teams despite his gaudy scoring totals. He signed on with the Idaho Steelheads in 1998 and went on to become the franchise leading scorer for a second team. For three consecutive seasons he scored 50 goals and 100 points for the Steelheads. Ingraham also helped the team reach the Taylor Cup Finals in his final two seasons, retiring following the 2002 championship.

After hanging up his skates, Ingraham remained in Idaho and became a coach. He eventually worked his way up to becoming the head coach for Boise State University, heading the club team from 2011 to 2017.

== Statistics ==
=== Regular season and playoffs ===
			Regular Season					Playoffs
Season	Team	League	GP	G	A	Pts	PIM	GP	G	A	Pts	PIM
1987–88	Avon Old Farms	US-Prep	—	—	—	—	—	—	—	—	—	—
1988–89	Avon Old Farms	US-Prep	—	—	—	—	—	—	—	—	—	—
1989–90	Air Force	NCAA	26	17	11	28	21	—	—	—	—	—
1991–92	Maine	Hockey East	37	15	30	45	22	—	—	—	—	—
1992–93	Maine	Hockey East	45	46	39	85	50	—	—	—	—	—
1993–94	Maine	Hockey East	24	12	17	29	20	—	—	—	—	—
1995–96	Tallahassee Tiger Sharks	ECHL	69	32	39	71	57	12	8	8	16	10
1996–97	Tallahassee Tiger Sharks	ECHL	70	34	58	92	54	3	1	0	1	2
1997–98	Tallahassee Tiger Sharks	ECHL	70	40	53	93	38	—	—	—	—	—
1998–99	Idaho Steelheads	WCHL	71	50	60	110	47	2	0	1	1	0
1999–00	Idaho Steelheads	WCHL	70	52	49	101	46	3	2	0	2	4
2000–01	Idaho Steelheads	WCHL	70	50	52	102	79	13	9	14	23	8
2001–02	Idaho Steelheads	WCHL	63	23	45	68	22	15	5	4	9	12
NCAA totals			132	90	97	187	113	—	—	—	—	—
ECHL totals			209	106	150	256	149	15	9	8	17	12
WCHL totals			274	175	206	381	194	33	16	19	35	24

== Awards and honors ==
Award	Year
AHCA East Second-Team All-American	1992–93
