= Jack Parker (ice hockey) =

American ice hockey player and coach

- Hockey Hall of Fame, 2025 (Builder)
- Born: March 11, 1945 (age 81) Somerville, Massachusetts, U.S.
- Height: 5 ft 10 in (178 cm)
- Weight: 145 lb (66 kg; 10 st 5 lb)
- Position: Center
- Played for: Boston University
- Playing career: 1965–1968 Coaching career

Coaching career (HC unless noted)
- 1968–1969: Medford HS (MA)
- 1969–1973: Boston University (asst.)
- 1973–2013: Boston University

Head coaching record
- Overall: 897–472–115 (.643)
- Tournaments: 30–25 (.545)

Accomplishments and honors

Championships
- 3x NCAA national champion (1978, 1995, 2009); 6x Hockey East tournament champion (1986, 1994, 1995, 1997, 2006, 2009); 8x Hockey East regular season champion (1991, 1995, 1996, 1997, 1998, 2000, 2006, 2009); 4x ECAC Hockey tournament champion (1974, 1975, 1976, 1977); 2x ECAC Hockey regular season champion (1976, 1978); ECAC Hockey East Region Champion (1984)

Awards
- 3x Spencer Penrose Award (1975, 1978, 2009); 5x Bob Kullen Coach of the Year Award (1986, 1992, 2000, 2005, 2006); 1994 Boston University Athletic Hall of Fame; 2014 Hobey Baker Legend of College Hockey Award; Beanpot Hall of Fame

Records
- Most Wins One School: (897); Most Losses One School: (472; D-I); Most Ties One School: (115); Most NCAA Tournament Appearances: (24); Most Beanpot Victories: (21); Most Frozen Four Appearances: (13); Most consecutive Beanpot Victories: (6); Most consecutive Hockey East Regular Season titles: (5); Most consecutive ECAC tournament titles: (4-tied)

Jack Parker (born March 11, 1945) is an American ice hockey coach, who previously served as the head coach of the Boston University Terriers men's ice hockey team. The 2012–13 hockey season was Parker's 40th and final season as head coach of the Terriers, and his 47th overall at the school as a player or coach. Parker was inducted into the Hockey Hall of Fame in 2025 as a builder.

== Playing career ==
Parker graduated from Catholic Memorial School in West Roxbury in 1963. He played for the Terriers from 1965 to 1968. The team was a combined 72–22–4 while Parker was a center for the team. Parker played on three Beanpot Championship teams and two teams which played in the NCAA tournament placing fourth in 1966 and second in 1967. Parker was captain of the team during his senior year on the team. Parker played against Boston College's former coach, Jerry York, while York was at BC and in high school.

== Coaching career ==
Immediately after graduating, Parker was named head coach at Medford High School. After only one year, he returned to BU as an assistant under his former college coach, Jack Kelley, and helped lead the Terriers to two consecutive national championships in 1971 and 1972. After Kelley left the program to become general manager and head coach of the New England Whalers, Parker was promoted to B-team coach under his predecessor, Leon Abbott.

Abbott was abruptly fired on December 21, 1973 for withholding information about the eligibility of two Canadian players who had played junior hockey in their native country, even though a judge questioned the constitutionality of the rules allegedly violated. Parker was named his successor.

Parker was asked by USA Hockey about coaching the Olympic team for the 1980 Olympics. He declined the position, which opened the door for Herb Brooks to serve as coach.

On February 8, 1989, Parker was named Boston University's athletic director. He was going to step down as head coach at the end of the 1988–89 season, but on February 21, 1989, Parker announced he was relinquishing the AD's job to continue coaching.

Parker was named the NCAA Coach of the Year three times, the first after the 1974–75 season, again after the 1977–78 season and a third time after 2008-09. Parker was also named the Hockey East Coach of the Year after the 1985–86, 1991–92, 1999–2000, 2004–05 and 2005-06 seasons. On January 30, 2009, Parker claimed his 800th win in a 3-1 victory over Merrimack College. He was only the third coach to win 800 games, and the first to do so with one team. On April 11, 2009, Parker won his 30th NCAA tournament game and third team national title.

Parker retired at the end of the 2012-13 season. He finished with a record of 897–472–115. At the time of his retirement, he was the third-winningest coach in NCAA history, behind only Ron Mason and Jerry York. His 897 wins are far and away the most in BU history, and are more than four times the total of runner-up Harry Cleverly. He has had a hand in more than two-thirds of BU's all-time wins. Apart from his one year as Medford High's coach, he spent the first 48 years of his adult life at BU as a player, assistant coach and head coach.

== Retirement ==
On March 11, 2013, Parker announced that the 2012–13 season would be his last, telling BU Today, "Forty years is a long time to be at the same institution in the same job. I think I’m a little long in the tooth. I don’t think I’ve had the focus I need to have. I haven’t lost a step, but I don’t want to lose a step." In 2014, Coach Parker's jersey number 6 was retired by the Terriers in a ceremony during a game against the University of New Hampshire.

In 2017, he was inducted into the United States Hockey Hall of Fame.

== Head coaching record ==
=== College ===
Record table
Season	Team	Overall	Conference	Standing	Postseason
Boston University Terriers (ECAC Hockey) (1973–1984)
1973–74	Boston University	19–6–0†	11–5–0†	3rd	NCAA consolation game (win)
1974–75	Boston University	26–5–1	20–2–0	2nd	NCAA consolation game (win)
1975–76	Boston University	25–5–0	21–2–0	1st	NCAA consolation game (loss)
1976–77	Boston University	20–11–1	16–7–1	4th	NCAA consolation game (win)
1977–78	Boston University	30–2–0	21–1–0	1st	NCAA national champion
1978–79	Boston University	21–7–2	17–4–2	1st	ECAC third-place game (loss)
1979–80	Boston University	11–17–0	8–14–0	14th	
1980–81	Boston University	14–15–0	10–12–0	12th	
1981–82	Boston University	14–11–3	9–10–3	t-10th	
1982–83	Boston University	18–11–1	14–7–0	6th	ECAC quarterfinals
1983–84	Boston University	28–11–1	15–6–0	t-2nd	NCAA quarterfinals
Boston University:		226–101–9	162–70–6		
Boston University Terriers (Hockey East) (1984–2013)
1984–85	Boston University	24–14–4	19–11–4	2nd	Hockey East consolation game (win)
1985–86	Boston University	25–14–4	20–11–3	2nd	NCAA quarterfinals
1986–87	Boston University	19–15–3	15–14–3	4th	Hockey East quarterfinals
1987–88	Boston University	14–17–3	11–12–3	4th	Hockey East quarterfinals
1988–89	Boston University	14–21–1	10–15–1	5th	Hockey East quarterfinals
1989–90	Boston University	25–17–2	12–7–2	3rd	NCAA Frozen Four
1990–91	Boston University	28–11–2	13–6–2	3rd	NCAA runner-up
1991–92	Boston University	23–8–4	11–6–4	2nd	NCAA East regional quarterfinals
1992–93	Boston University	29–9–2	18–5–1	2nd	NCAA Frozen Four
1993–94	Boston University	34–7–0	21–3–0	1st	NCAA runner-up
1994–95	Boston University	31–6–3	16–5–3–2	t-1st	NCAA national champion
1995–96	Boston University	30–7–3	17–5–2–1	1st	NCAA Frozen Four
1996–97	Boston University	26–9–6	16–4–4	t-1st	NCAA runner-up
1997–98	Boston University	28–8–2	18–4–2	1st	NCAA East regional semifinals
1998–99	Boston University	14–20–3	8–13–3	5th	Hockey East quarterfinals
1999–2000	Boston University	25–10–7	15–3–5	1st	NCAA East regional semifinals
2000–01	Boston University	14–20–3	9–12–3	6th	Hockey East quarterfinals
2001–02	Boston University	25–10–3	15–6–3	t-2nd	NCAA East regional semifinals
2002–03	Boston University	25–14–3	13–10–1	5th	NCAA Northeast regional final
2003–04	Boston University	12–17–9	6–13–5	8th	Hockey East semifinals
2004–05	Boston University	23–14–4	15–5–4	t-2nd	NCAA East regional semifinals
2005–06	Boston University	26–10–4	17–7–3	1st	NCAA Northeast regional final
2006–07	Boston University	20–10–9	13–6–8	3rd	NCAA Midwest regional semifinals
2007–08	Boston University	19–17–4	15–10–3	2nd	Hockey East semifinals
2008–09	Boston University	35–6–4	18–5–4	1st	NCAA national champion
2009–10	Boston University	18–17–3	13–12–2	t-3rd	Hockey East semifinals
2010–11	Boston University	19–12–8	15–6–6	3rd	Hockey East quarterfinals
2011–12	Boston University	23–15–1	17–8–1	t-2nd	NCAA West regional semifinals
2012–13	Boston University	21–16–2	15–10–2	t-3rd	Hockey East runner-up
Boston University:		671–371–106	423–235–85		
Total:		897–472–115			
National champion Postseason invitational champion Conference regular season champion Conference regular season and conference tournament champion Division regular season champion Division regular season and conference tournament champion Conference tournament champion

†Parker took over as coach after Leon Abbott was fired mid-season. BU credits the first six games of the season to Abbott and the final 25 years to Parker.

- 3-time NCAA men's champions (1978, 1995, 2009)
- 4-time ECAC men's champions (1974, 1975, 1976, 1977)
- 3-time ECAC men's regular season champions (1976, 1978, 1979)
- 7-time Hockey East men's champions (1986, 1991, 1994, 1995, 1997, 2006, 2009)
- 8-time Hockey East men's regular season champions (1994, 1995, 1996, 1997, 1998, 2000, 2006, 2009)
- 21-time Beanpot winners (1975, 1978, 1979, 1982, 1986, 1987, 1990, 1991, 1992, 1995, 1996, 1997, 1998, 1999, 2000, 2002, 2003, 2005, 2006, 2007, 2009)

== Notable players ==
A list of notable players whom Parker has coached:

- Tony Amonte, Former NHL player
- Bob Deraney, Providence Friars women's ice hockey coach (1999–present)
- Jim Craig, 1980 Miracle on Ice Olympian
- John Cullen, Former NHL player
- Rick DiPietro, First goaltender selected with the number-one pick in an NHL entry draft. See 2000 NHL entry draft
- Chris Drury, Hobey Baker Award winner in 1998
- Mike Eruzione, Captain of the 1980 Miracle on Ice Olympic hockey team
- Matt Gilroy, Hobey Baker Award winner in 2009
- Shawn McEachern, Former NHL player
- Rick Meagher, Former NHL player
- Jack O'Callahan, 1980 Miracle on Ice Olympian. Former NHL player
- Jay Pandolfo, Former NHL player
- Tom Poti, Former NHL player
- Travis Roy, Quadriplegic who injured himself eleven seconds into his first-ever shift, only player to have his number retired by Parker
- Dave Silk, 1980 Miracle on Ice Olympian
- Mike Sullivan, New York Rangers Head Coach (2025–Present) and Former Pittsburgh Penguins Head Coach (2015–2025)
- Keith Tkachuk, Former NHL player
- Ryan Whitney, Former NHL player

== See also ==
- List of college men's ice hockey coaches with 400 wins

Awards and achievements
Preceded by Charlie Holt; Jerry York; Red Berenson	Spencer Penrose Award; 1974–75; 1977–78; 2008–09	Succeeded by John MacInnes; Charlie Holt; Wayne Wilson
Preceded by Len Ceglarski; Dick Umile; Dick Umile; Jerry York	Bob Kullen Coach of the Year Award; 1985–86; 1991–92; 1999–00; 2004–05, 2005–06	Succeeded by Bill Riley Jr. Shawn Walsh; Paul Pooley; Dick Umile
Preceded by Jeff Sauer	Hobey Baker Legends of College Hockey Award; 2014	Succeeded by Tim Taylor
