= Bruce Crowder =

Canadian ice hockey player

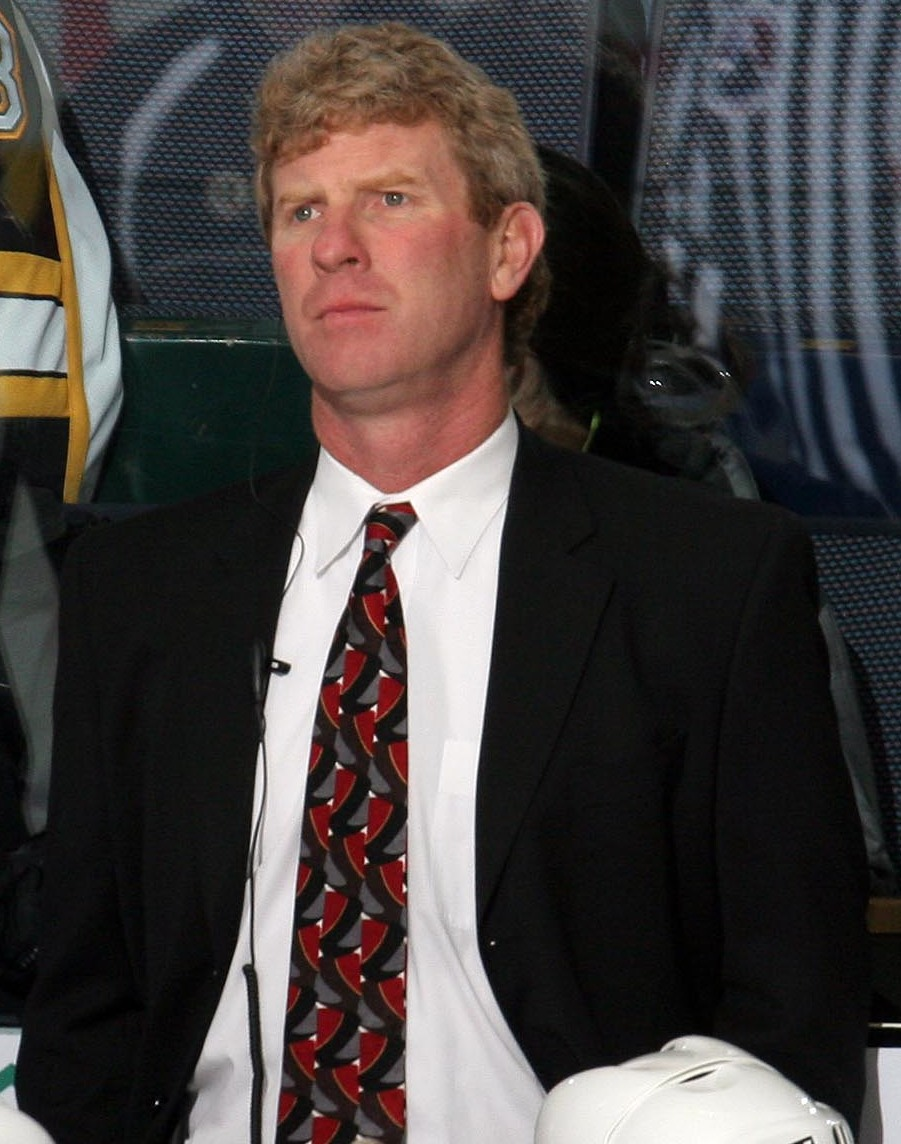
- Crowder in 2005
- Born: March 25, 1957 (age 69) Essex, Ontario, Canada
- Height: 6 ft 0 in (183 cm)
- Weight: 180 lb (82 kg; 12 st 12 lb)
- Position: Right wing
- Shot: Right
- Played for: Boston Bruins; Pittsburgh Penguins
- NHL draft: 153rd overall, 1977; Philadelphia Flyers
- WHA draft: 84th overall, 1977; Calgary Cowboys
- Playing career: 1979–1985
- Coaching career

Biographical details
- Education: University of New Hampshire

Playing career
- 1975–1979: New Hampshire
- Position: Right wing

Coaching career (HC unless noted)
- 1986–1990: Maine (Assistant)
- 1990–1991: Massachusetts–Lowell (Associate)
- 1991–1996: Massachusetts–Lowell
- 1996–2005: Northeastern
- 2006–2007: Portland Pirates

Head coaching record
- Overall: 223–243–52 (.481)
- Tournaments: 2–2 (.500)

Bruce James Crowder (born March 25, 1957) is a Canadian former professional ice hockey forward who played four seasons in the National Hockey League (NHL) for the Boston Bruins and Pittsburgh Penguins from 1981–82 to 1984–85. He is the brother of Keith Crowder and also the brother of Craig Crowder.

== Playing career ==
Crowder was drafted 153rd overall by the Philadelphia Flyers in the 1977 NHL amateur draft. He played 243 career NHL games, scoring 47 goals and 51 assists for 98 points. His best offensive season was the 1982–83 season when he garnered career highs in goals with 21, assists with 19, and points with 40.

== Coaching career ==
After leaving the professional game, Crowder spent 14 seasons in the collegiate coaching ranks. Crowder spent the 1987–1988 and 1989–1990 as an assistant at the University of Maine, before joining UMass Lowell. In 1991, he was promoted to the head coach of the River Hawks and posted a record of 11–19–4. In the following four seasons with UMass Lowell Crowder's record was an impressive 88–56–15, and in 1996 he took over the head coaching job at Northeastern where he was 124–168–33 over 9 seasons, finishing last in the conference 4 times. He was released from his coaching responsibilities at Northeastern in the Spring of 2005 and was replaced by Greg Cronin.

== Career statistics ==
| | | | Regular Season | | | | | Playoffs |
| Season | Team | League | GP | G | A | Pts | PIM | GP | G | A | Pts | PIM |
|---|---|---|---|---|---|---|---|---|---|---|---|---|
| 1975–76 | New Hampshire Wildcats | ECAC | 31 | 6 | 12 | 18 | 14 | — | — | — | — | — |
| 1976–77 | New Hampshire Wildcats | ECAC | 39 | 9 | 9 | 18 | 28 | — | — | — | — | — |
| 1977–78 | New Hampshire Wildcats | ECAC | 30 | 10 | 35 | 45 | 58 | — | — | — | — | — |
| 1978–79 | New Hampshire Wildcats | ECAC | 35 | 22 | 30 | 52 | 34 | — | — | — | — | — |
| 1979–80 | Maine Mariners | AHL | 49 | 16 | 11 | 27 | 23 | 11 | 3 | 1 | 4 | 13 |
| 1980–81 | Maine Mariners | AHL | 68 | 25 | 19 | 44 | 94 | 20 | 11 | 6 | 17 | 29 |
| 1981–82 | Boston Bruins | NHL | 63 | 16 | 11 | 27 | 31 | 11 | 5 | 3 | 8 | 9 |
| 1981–82 | Erie Blades | AHL | 15 | 6 | 6 | 12 | 6 | — | — | — | — | — |
| 1982–83 | Boston Bruins | NHL | 80 | 21 | 19 | 40 | 58 | 17 | 3 | 1 | 4 | 34 |
| 1983–84 | Boston Bruins | NHL | 74 | 6 | 14 | 20 | 44 | 3 | 0 | 0 | 0 | 0 |
| 1984–85 | Pittsburgh Penguins | NHL | 26 | 4 | 7 | 11 | 23 | — | — | — | — | — |
| NHL totals | | | 243 | 47 | 51 | 98 | 156 | 31 | 8 | 4 | 12 | 43 |

== Head coaching record ==
Record table
| Season | Team | Overall | Conference | Standing | Postseason |
|---|---|---|---|---|---|
Massachusetts–Lowell Chiefs (Hockey East) (1991–1994)
| 1991–92 | Massachusetts–Lowell | 11–19–4 | 6–11–4 | 6th | Hockey East Quarterfinals |
| 1992–93 | Massachusetts–Lowell | 20–17–2 | 10–13–1 | t-4th | Hockey East Consolation Game (win) |
| 1993–94 | Massachusetts–Lowell | 25–10–5 | 14–6–4 | 2nd | NCAA West Regional semifinals |
| Massachusetts–Lowell: | | 56–46–11 | 30–30–9 | | |
Massachusetts–Lowell River Hawks (Hockey East) (1994–1996)
| 1994–95 | Massachusetts–Lowell | 17–19–4 | 11–12–1–1 | 5th | Hockey East Consolation Game (loss) |
| 1995–96 | Massachusetts–Lowell | 26–10–4 | 16–6–2–1 | 2nd | NCAA West Regional semifinals |
| Massachusetts–Lowell: | | 43–29–8 | 27–18–3–2 | | |
Northeastern Huskies (Hockey East) (1996–2005)
| 1996–97 | Northeastern | 12–23–0 | 7–17–0 | 9th | Hockey East Quarterfinals |
| 1997–98 | Northeastern | 21–15–3 | 13–8–3 | 4th | Hockey East Quarterfinals |
| 1998–99 | Northeastern | 11–20–3 | 6–16–2 | 9th | |
| 1999–00 | Northeastern | 12–19–5 | 8–11–5 | t-5th | Hockey East Quarterfinals |
| 2000–01 | Northeastern | 13–19–4 | 7–13–4 | 7th | Hockey East Quarterfinals |
| 2001–02 | Northeastern | 19–17–3 | 11–11–2 | 5th | Hockey East Quarterfinals |
| 2002–03 | Northeastern | 10–21–3 | 5–17–2 | t-8th | |
| 2003–04 | Northeastern | 11–16–7 | 5–13–6 | 9th | |
| 2004–05 | Northeastern | 15–18–5 | 10–10–4 | 6th | Hockey East Quarterfinals |
| Northeastern: | | 124–168–33 | 72–116–28 | | |
| Total: | | 223–243–52 | | | |
National champion Postseason invitational champion Conference regular season champion Conference regular season and conference tournament champion Division regular season champion Division regular season and conference tournament champion Conference tournament champion

Awards and achievements
| Preceded by Shawn Walsh; Shawn Walsh; Dick Umile | Bob Kullen Coach of the Year Award; 1993–94; 1995–96; 1997–98 | Succeeded by Shawn Walsh; Dick Umile; Dick Umile |
| Preceded by Shawn Walsh | Spencer Penrose Award; 1995–96 | Succeeded by Dean Blais |
