= Fabrizi =

Fabrizi is a surname of Italian origin. Notable people with the name include:

- Aldo Fabrizi (1905–90), Italian actor, director, screenwriter and comedian
- Antonio Maria Fabrizi or Fabrizzi (1594–1649), Italian painter
- Daniel Fabrizi (born 1992), Canadian soccer player
- Elena Fabrizi (1915–93), Italian actress and TV personality
- Franco Fabrizi (1916–95), Italian actor
- John M. Fabrizi (born 1956), mayor of Bridgeport, Connecticut
- Mario Fabrizi (1924–63), British actor
- Nicola Fabrizi (1804–85), Italian patriot
- Valeria Fabrizi (born 1936), Italian actress
- Vincenzo Fabrizi (1764–c. 1812), Italian composer
