= Bob Kullen Coach of the Year Award =

Annual ice hockey award

- Sport: Ice hockey
- Awarded for: to the head coach who is considered to have demonstrated the highest number of significant accomplishments over the course of the season as voted by the conference's head coaches.

History
- First award: 1985
- Most recent: Mike Cavanaugh (UConn)

The Bob Kullen Coach of the Year Award is an annual award given out at the conclusion of the Hockey East regular season to the best coach in the conference as voted by the head coaches of each Hockey East team. The award was renamed in honor of Bob Kullen who served as head coach of New Hampshire in the late-80's before heart disease forced him to receive a heart transplant and subsequently retire shortly before his death in 1990.

The Coach of the Year was first awarded in 1985 and every year thereafter. The award has been shared once, in 2009–10, between Merrimack's Mark Dennehy and New Hampshire's Dick Umile.

== Award winners ==
Year	Winner	School	Ref
1984–85	Len Ceglarski	Boston College	
1985–86	Jack Parker	Boston University	
1986–87	Bill Riley Jr.	UMass Lowell	
1987–88	Shawn Walsh	Maine	
1988–89	Fern Flaman	Northeastern	
1989–90	Shawn Walsh	Maine	
1990–91	Dick Umile	New Hampshire	
1991–92	Jack Parker	Boston University	
1992–93	Shawn Walsh	Maine	
1993–94	Bruce Crowder	UMass Lowell	
1994–95	Shawn Walsh	Maine	
1995–96	Bruce Crowder	UMass Lowell	
1996–97	Dick Umile	New Hampshire	
1997–98	Bruce Crowder	Northeastern	
1998–99	Dick Umile	New Hampshire	
1999–00	Jack Parker	Boston University	
2000–01	Paul Pooley	Providence	
2001–02	Dick Umile	New Hampshire	
2002–03	Don Cahoon	Massachusetts	
2003–04	Jerry York	Boston College	

Year	Winner	School	Ref
2004–05	Jack Parker	Boston University	
2005–06	Jack Parker	Boston University	
2006–07	Dick Umile	New Hampshire	
2007–08	Kevin Sneddon	Vermont	
2008–09	Greg Cronin	Northeastern	
2009–10	Mark Dennehy	Merrimack	
2009–10	Dick Umile	New Hampshire	
2010–11	Jerry York	Boston College	
2011–12	Norm Bazin	UMass Lowell	
2012–13	Norm Bazin	UMass Lowell	
2013–14	Jerry York	Boston College	
2014–15	David Quinn	Boston University	
2015–16	Nate Leaman	Providence	
2016–17	Norm Bazin	UMass Lowell	
2017–18	Jerry York	Boston College	
2018–19	Greg Carvel	Massachusetts	
2019–20	Red Gendron	Maine	
2020–21	Jerry York	Boston College	
2021–22	Jerry Keefe	Northeastern	
2022–23	Jay Pandolfo	Boston University	
2023–24	Greg Brown	Boston College	
2024–25	Mike Cavanaugh	UConn	

=== Winners by school ===
School	Winners
Boston University	7
Boston College	7
New Hampshire	6
UMass Lowell	6
Maine	5
Northeastern	4
Massachusetts	2
Providence	2
Merrimack	1
UConn	1
Vermont	1

=== Multiple Winners ===
Position	Winners
Dick Umile	6
Jerry York	5
Jack Parker	5
Shawn Walsh	4
Norm Bazin	3
Bruce Crowder	3

== See also ==
- Hockey East Awards
