= Shawn Walsh =

American ice hockey coach (1955-2001)

Biographical details
- Born: June 21, 1955; White Plains, New York, U.S.
- Died: September 24, 2001 (aged 46); Bangor, Maine, U.S.
- Education: Bowling Green State University

Coaching career (HC unless noted)
- 1978–1979: Bowling Green (Assistant)
- 1979–1984: Michigan State (Assistant)
- 1984–1995: Maine
- 1996–2001: Maine

Head coaching record
- Overall: 399–215–44 (.640)

Accomplishments and honors

Championships
- 1988 Hockey East Champion; 1989 Hockey East Tournament champion 1992 Hockey East Champion; 1992 Hockey East tournament champion 1993 Hockey East Champion; 1993 Hockey East tournament champion 1993 NCAA National Champion; 1995 Hockey East Champion; 1999 NCAA national champion 2000 Hockey East tournament champion

Awards
- 1988 Hockey East Coach of the Year Award; 1990 Hockey East Coach of the Year Award; 1993 Bob Kullen Coach of the Year Award; 1995 Bob Kullen Coach of the Year Award; 1995 Spencer Penrose Award

Records
- Most wins one season (42)

William Shawn Walsh (June 21, 1955 – September 24, 2001) was the head ice hockey coach for the University of Maine Black Bears.

== Career ==
Walsh was a third-string goalie for Bowling Green State University. As a sophomore, he decided to concentrate on coaching as a volunteer assistant for the BGSU hockey team. He was graduated from Bowling Green with a bachelor's degree in education. He later earned a master's degree in the same field of study.

After completing his undergraduate studies, Walsh was hired as a full-time assistant coach at BGSU by Ron Mason. Walsh followed Mason to Michigan State in 1979 where they inherited a program that had only won 36 games in its previous three seasons. After only five years, Mason and Walsh had guided MSU to three-straight NCAA Tournament appearances, back-to-back 30-win seasons and the 1984 Frozen Four—the school's first Frozen Four appearance in 17 years.

In 1984 Walsh took over a Maine program that had gone 27–65 in the three seasons prior. He built the program into a national power. In his third year, he led Maine to its first-ever NCAA Tournament, followed by consecutive Frozen Fours in 1988 and 1989. In 1992–93, he led Maine to an astonishing 42–1–2 record and their first NCAA title. Maine was also national finalists in 1995. He coached Hobey Baker Award winners Scott Pellerin (1992) and Paul Kariya (1993).

Walsh was suspended from coaching for one year starting mid-season in 1995–96 after a series of NCAA investigations. He returned during the 1996–97 season and quickly built Maine back into a national contender, winning another national championship in 1999.

Walsh was diagnosed with a common form of kidney cancer known as renal cell carcinoma in June 2000. At the time of his death, he was only 46 years old. Walsh had a career record of 399–215–44.

== Head coaching record ==
Record table
Season	Team	Overall	Conference	Standing	Postseason
Maine Black Bears (Hockey East) (1984–1995)
1984–85	Maine	12–29–1	8–26–0	7th	Hockey East Quarterfinals
1985–86	Maine	11–28–1	8–25–1	5th	Hockey East Quarterfinals
1986–87	Maine	24–16–2	19–12–1	3rd	NCAA Quarterfinals
1987–88	Maine	34–8–2	20–4–2	1st	NCAA third-place game (win)
1988–89	Maine	31–14–0	17–9–0	2nd	NCAA third-place game (loss)
1989–90	Maine	33–11–2	14–6–1	2nd	NCAA Quarterfinals
1990–91	Maine	32–9–2	15–5–1	2nd	NCAA Frozen Four
1991–92	Maine	18–17–2†	12–7–2†	t-2nd	NCAA East regional semifinals
1992–93	Maine	42–1–2	22–1–1	1st	NCAA national champion
1993–94	Maine	6–29–1‡	3–20–1‡	8th	Hockey East Quarterfinals
1994–95	Maine	32–6–6	15–3–6–1	t-1st	NCAA runner-up
1995–96	Maine	14–3–3^	8–2–3^	13th	
Maine:		289–171–24	161–120–19		
Maine Black Bears (Hockey East) (1996–2001)
1996–97	Maine	15–3–0^	14–2–0^	3rd	*
1997–98	Maine	17–15–4	10–11–3	6th	Hockey East Runner-Up
1998–99	Maine	31–6–4	17–5–2	2nd	NCAA national champion
1999–00	Maine	27–8–5	13–7–4	4th	NCAA Frozen Four
2000–01	Maine	20–12–7	12–7–5	t-2nd	NCAA East regional semifinals
Maine:		110–44–20	66–32–14		
Total:		399–215–44			
National champion Postseason invitational champion Conference regular season champion Conference regular season and conference tournament champion Division regular season champion Division regular season and conference tournament champion Conference tournament champion

† Maine was forced to retroactively forfeit 13 games after the season for using an ineligible player
‡ Maine was forced to retroactively forfeit 14 games during the season for using an ineligible player
^ On December 22 Maine Suspended Walsh for one year for repeated NCAA rules violations
* Maine voluntarily ruled itself ineligible for any postseason play in 1997

== See also ==
- List of college men's ice hockey coaches with 400 wins

Awards and achievements
Preceded by Bill Riley Jr. Fern Flaman; Jack Parker; Bruce Crowder	Bob Kullen Coach of the Year Award; 1987–88; 1989–90; 1992–93; 1994–95	Succeeded by Fern Flaman; Dick Umile; Bruce Crowder; Bruce Crowder
Preceded by Don Lucia	Spencer Penrose Award; 1994–95	Succeeded by Bruce Crowder
