= 1993 Hockey East men's ice hockey tournament =

1993 Hockey East Men's ice hockey tournament
- Dates: March 12–29, 1993
- Teams: 8
- Finals site: Boston Garden; Boston, Massachusetts
- Champions: Maine (3rd title)
- Winning coach: Shawn Walsh (3rd title)
- MVP: Jim Montgomery (Maine)
- Hockey East Men's Ice Hockey Tournaments

The 1993 Hockey East Men's Ice Hockey Tournament was the 9th tournament in the history of the conference. It was played between March 12 and March 20, 1993. Quarterfinal games were played at home team campus sites, while the final four games were played at the Boston Garden in Boston, Massachusetts, the home venue of the NHL's Boston Bruins. By winning the tournament, Maine received the Hockey East's automatic bid to the 1993 NCAA Division I Men's Ice Hockey Tournament.

== Format ==
The tournament featured three rounds of play. In the first round, the first and eighth seeds, the second and seventh seeds, the third seed and sixth seeds, and the fourth seed and fifth seeds played a two-game series where the team that scored the most total goals was declared the winner and advanced to the semifinals. In the semifinals, the highest and lowest seeds and second highest and second lowest seeds play a single-elimination game, with the winners advancing to the championship game and the losers meeting in a third-place game. The tournament champion receives an automatic bid to the 1993 NCAA Division I Men's Ice Hockey Tournament.

== Conference standings ==
Note: GP = Games played; W = Wins; L = Losses; T = Ties; PTS = Points; GF = Goals For; GA = Goals Against

1992–93 Hockey East standings
	Conference							Overall					
	GP	W	L	T	PTS	GF	GA	GP	W	L	T	GF	GA
Maine†*	24	22	1	1	45	162	56	45	42	1	2	272	107
Boston University	24	18	5	1	37	126	84	40	29	9	2	193	126
New Hampshire	24	11	11	2	24	102	99	38	18	17	3	158	143
Massachusetts–Lowell	24	10	13	1	21	100	100	39	20	17	2	158	151
Providence	24	9	12	3	21	91	109	36	16	16	4	149	147
Merrimack	24	8	16	0	16	85	141	36	14	20	2	135	184
Boston College	24	6	15	3	15	80	120	38	9	24	5	117	187
Northeastern	24	6	17	1	13	89	127	35	10	24	1	137	193
Championship: Maine † indicates conference regular season champion * indicates conference tournament champion

== Bracket ==
Teams are reseeded after the quarterfinals

Quarterfinals; March 12–14
1	Maine	6	9	15
8	Northeastern	1	5	6
2	Boston University	6	5	11
7	Boston College	2	1	3
3	New Hampshire	5	9	14
6	Merrimack	3	2	5
4	Massachusetts-Lowell	7	3*	10
5	Providence	4	3	7

Semifinals; March 19
1	Maine	7
4	Massachusetts-Lowell	5
2	Boston University	2
3	New Hampshire	0

Championship; March 20
1	Maine	5
2	Boston University	2
Consolation
3	New Hampshire	4
4	Massachusetts-Lowell	5*

Note: * denotes overtime period(s)

=== Quarterfinals ===
==== (1) Maine vs. (8) Northeastern ====
March 12	Maine	6 – 1	Northeastern	Alfond Arena

March 14	Maine	9 – 5	Northeastern	Alfond Arena

Maine won series 15–6

==== (2) Boston University vs. (7) Boston College ====
March 12	Boston University	6 – 2	Boston College	Walter Brown Arena

March 14	Boston University	5 – 1	Boston College	Walter Brown Arena

Boston University won series 11–3

==== (3) New Hampshire vs. (6) Merrimack ====
March 12	New Hampshire	5 – 3	Merrimack	Snively Arena

March 14	New Hampshire	9 – 2	Merrimack	Snively Arena

New Hampshire won series 14–4

==== (4) Massachusetts-Lowell vs. (5) Providence ====
March 12	Massachusetts-Lowell	7 – 4	Providence	Tully Forum

March 14	Massachusetts-Lowell	3 – 3	OT	Providence	Tully Forum

Massachusetts-Lowell won series 10–7

=== Semifinals ===
==== (1) Maine vs. (4) Massachusetts-Lowell ====
March 19	Maine	7 – 5	Massachusetts-Lowell	Boston Garden

==== (2) Boston University vs. (3) New Hampshire ====
March 19	Boston University	2 – 0	New Hampshire	Boston Garden

=== Third Place ===
==== (3) New Hampshire vs. (4) Massachusetts-Lowell ====
March 20	New Hampshire	4 – 5	OT	Massachusetts-Lowell	Boston Garden

=== Championship ===
==== (1) Maine vs. (2) Boston University ====
March 20	Maine	5 – 2	Boston University	Boston Garden

== Tournament awards ==
=== All-Tournament Team ===
- F Jim Montgomery* (Maine)
- F Michael Murray (Massachusetts-Lowell)
- F David Sacco (Boston University)
- D Rich Brennan (Boston University)
- D Chris Imes (Maine)
- G Garth Snow (Maine)

* Tournament MVP(s)
