= Fernie Flaman =

Canadian ice hockey player (1927–2012)

- Hockey Hall of Fame, 1990
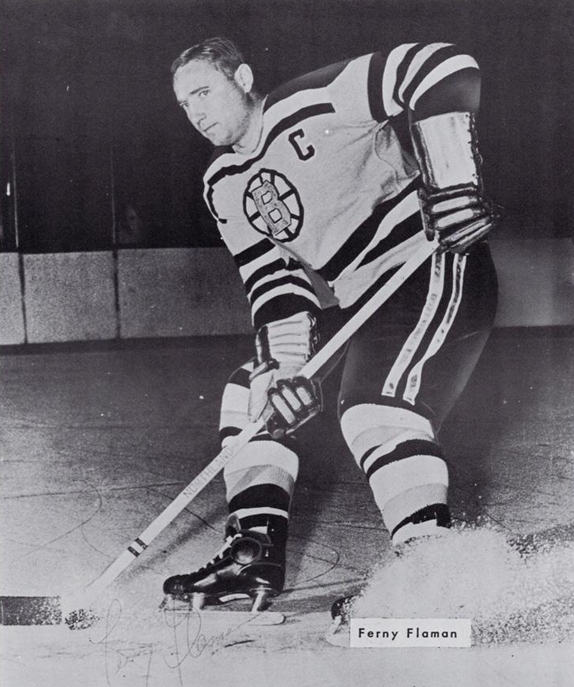
- Flaman with the Boston Bruins in 1958
- Born: January 25, 1927 Dysart, Saskatchewan, Canada
- Died: June 22, 2012 (aged 85) Westwood, Massachusetts, U.S.
- Height: 5 ft 10 in (178 cm)
- Weight: 190 lb (86 kg; 13 st 8 lb)
- Position: Defence
- Shot: Right
- Played for: Boston Bruins; Toronto Maple Leafs
- Playing career: 1943–1964

Ferdinand Charles Carl "Fernie" Flaman (January 25, 1927 – June 22, 2012) was a Canadian professional ice hockey defenceman who played for the Boston Bruins and Toronto Maple Leafs in the National Hockey League (NHL). He was known as a physical defensive defenceman and a consummate bodychecker. As a coach, Flaman was successful at the collegiate ranks as the head coach of Northeastern University.

== Career ==
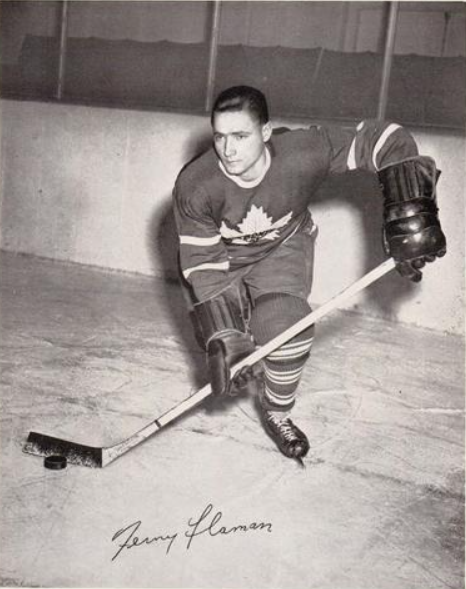
Flaman with the Toronto Maple Leafs

After being signed by the Bruins in 1943 and playing three seasons for the minor-league Boston Olympics (during which time he was named to the Eastern Hockey League's First All-Star Team in 1945 and 1946), Flaman made the big club for good in the 1947 season. He played five seasons for Boston before being traded to the Toronto Maple Leafs, with whom he won a Stanley Cup the year he was dealt in 1951.

He played three more seasons for Toronto before being dealt back to the Bruins in 1954 (in which he led the league in penalty minutes with 150), for whom he played seven more seasons. Those were his peak years, as he was named Bruins' captain in 1955 (and served as such for the rest of his NHL career), was named to three NHL Second All-Star Teams (1955, 1957 and 1958), and played in multiple All-Star Games (five or six, depending on the source).

In 1961, Flaman was named the player-coach-general manager of the AHL Providence Reds, retiring as an active player after the 1963–1964 season. He coached Providence for one more year after that, coaching teams in the Western Hockey League and the Central Hockey League thereafter. In 1970, Flaman was named the head coach of the Northeastern University Huskies men's college team, and coached for nineteen seasons (the longest tenure in school history), amassing a 256–301–24 record. He was named United States college coach of the year in 1982, earning him the Spencer Penrose Award. He led the Huskies to four Beanpot Tournament championships and a Hockey East championship in 1988. He won the Bob Kullen Coach of the Year Award in 1989. He also retired from Northeastern the same year. He carried out the remainder of his career serving as a scout for the Devils.

Flaman finished his NHL career with 34 goals and 174 assists for 208 points in 910 games, and added 1370 penalty minutes. At the time of his retirement, he was third in NHL history in career penalty minutes.

Flaman was inducted into the Rhode Island Hockey Hall of Fame in 1965, the Northeastern Hall of Fame in 1989, the Hockey Hall of Fame in 1990, the Saskatchewan Sports Hall of Fame in 1992, the Massachusetts Hockey Hall of Fame in 2011, and the Ted Knight Saskatchewan Hockey Hall of Fame in 2019. He died in 2012.

In 2023 he would be named one of the top 100 Bruins players of all time.

== Honours and awards ==
=== Playing career ===
- NHL Second All-Star Team (1955, 1957, 1958)
- NHL All-Star Game appearances (5 or 6 times: 1951, 1953*, 1954, 1955, 1956, 1957)
- Stanley Cup champion (1951, Toronto Maple Leafs)
- Captain of the Boston Bruins (1955–1961)
- Named one of the “100 Greatest Bruins” (2023)

*Note: The 1953 All-Star game is sometimes excluded from mid-season All-Star counts, as it was played at the start of the season.

=== Coaching ===
- Spencer Penrose Award (1982)
- Led Northeastern to four Beanpot championships (1980, 1984, 1985, 1988)
- Led Northeastern to Hockey East championship (1988)
- Bob Kullen Coach of the Year Award (1989)

=== Halls of fame & institutional recognition ===
- Rhode Island Hockey Hall of Fame (1965)
- Northeastern Hall of Fame (1989)
- Hockey Hall of Fame (1990)
- Saskatchewan Sports Hall of Fame (1992)
- Massachusetts Hockey Hall of Fame (2011)
- Ted Knight Saskatchewan Hockey Hall of Fame (2019)

== Career statistics ==
=== Regular season and playoffs ===
			Regular season					Playoffs
Season	Team	League	GP	G	A	Pts	PIM	GP	G	A	Pts	PIM
1942–43	Regina Abbots	MJHL	1	0	0	0	0	—	—	—	—	—
1943–44	Boston Olympics	EAHL	32	12	7	19	31	12	2	6	8	14
1943–44	Brooklyn Crescents	EAHL	11	5	9	14	12	—	—	—	—	—
1944–45	Boston Bruins	NHL	1	0	0	0	0	—	—	—	—	—
1944–45	Boston Olympics	EAHL	46	16	27	43	75	10	3	5	8	13
1945–46	Boston Bruins	NHL	1	0	0	0	0	—	—	—	—	—
1945–46	Boston Olympics	EAHL	45	11	23	34	80	12	2	7	9	11
1946–47	Boston Bruins	NHL	23	1	4	5	41	5	0	0	0	8
1946–47	Hershey Bears	AHL	38	4	8	12	64	—	—	—	—	—
1947–48	Boston Bruins	NHL	56	4	6	10	69	5	0	0	0	12
1948–49	Boston Bruins	NHL	60	4	12	16	62	5	0	1	1	8
1949–50	Boston Bruins	NHL	69	2	5	7	122	—	—	—	—	—
1950–51	Boston Bruins	NHL	14	1	1	2	37	—	—	—	—	—
1950–51	Toronto Maple Leafs	NHL	39	2	6	8	64	9	1	0	1	8
1950–51	Pittsburgh Hornets	AHL	11	1	6	7	24	—	—	—	—	—
1951–52	Toronto Maple Leafs	NHL	61	0	7	7	110	4	0	2	2	18
1952–53	Toronto Maple Leafs	NHL	66	2	6	8	110	—	—	—	—	—
1953–54	Toronto Maple Leafs	NHL	62	0	8	8	84	2	0	0	0	0
1954–55	Boston Bruins	NHL	70	4	14	18	150	4	1	0	1	2
1955–56	Boston Bruins	NHL	62	4	17	21	70	—	—	—	—	—
1956–57	Boston Bruins	NHL	68	6	25	31	108	10	0	3	3	19
1957–58	Boston Bruins	NHL	66	0	15	15	71	12	2	2	4	10
1958–59	Boston Bruins	NHL	70	0	21	21	101	7	0	0	0	8
1959–60	Boston Bruins	NHL	60	2	18	20	112	—	—	—	—	—
1960–61	Boston Bruins	NHL	62	2	9	11	59	—	—	—	—	—
1961–62	Providence Reds	AHL	65	3	33	36	95	3	0	1	1	6
1962–63	Providence Reds	AHL	68	4	17	21	65	6	0	2	2	0
1963–64	Providence Reds	AHL	22	1	5	6	21	3	0	1	1	4
NHL totals			910	34	174	208	1370	63	4	8	12	93

== Head coaching record ==
Record table
Season	Team	Overall	Conference	Standing	Postseason
Northeastern Huskies (ECAC Hockey) (1970–1984)
1970–71	Northeastern	7-22-0	3-14-0	16th	
1971–72	Northeastern	6-20-0	3-17-0	16th	
1972–73	Northeastern	17-12-0	10-11-0	10th	
1973–74	Northeastern	10-13-4	7-10-2	12th	
1974–75	Northeastern	15-11-2	10-11-1	9th	
1975–76	Northeastern	9-16-1	6-16-1	14th	
1976–77	Northeastern	11-16-0	9-13-0	13th	
1977–78	Northeastern	10-17-1	7-16-1	15th	
1978–79	Northeastern	12-15-0	11-11-0	9th	
1979–80	Northeastern	7-20-0	5-16-0	16th	
1980–81	Northeastern	13-13-0	12-9-0	6th	ECAC Quarterfinals
1981–82	Northeastern	25-9-2	14-6-1	2nd	NCAA Consolation Game (Win)
1982–83	Northeastern	13-14-1	9-11-1	12th	
1983–84	Northeastern	16-12-1	10-10-0	t-9th	
Northeastern:		171-210-12	162-171-7		
Northeastern Huskies (Hockey East) (1984–1989)
1984–85	Northeastern	13-24-1	11-22-1	6th	Hockey East Quarterfinals
1985–86	Northeastern	20-17-2	18-14-2	3rd	Hockey East Quarterfinals
1986–87	Northeastern	13-21-3	11-18-3	5th	Hockey East Semifinals
1987–88	Northeastern	21-13-4	13-9-4	2nd	NCAA West Regional Quarterfinals
1988–89	Northeastern	18-16-2	13-11-2	3rd	Hockey East Consolation Game (Loss)
Northeastern:		85-91-12	66-74-12		
Total:		256-301-24			
National champion Postseason invitational champion Conference regular season champion Conference regular season and conference tournament champion Division regular season champion Division regular season and conference tournament champion Conference tournament champion

== See also ==
- Captain (ice hockey)

Sporting positions
Preceded by Ed Sandford	Boston Bruins captain 1955–61	Succeeded by Don McKenney
Awards and achievements
Preceded by Bill O'Flaherty	Spencer Penrose Award; 1981–82	Succeeded by Bill Cleary
Preceded by Shawn Walsh	Bob Kullen Coach of the Year Award; 1988–89	Succeeded by Shawn Walsh
Preceded by Herb Brooks	Hobey Baker Legends of College Hockey Award; 2012	Succeeded by Jeff Sauer
