= Leon Abbott =

Former college ice hockey coach

Playing career
- 1959–1964: McGill

Coaching career (HC unless noted)
- 1966–1969: Macdonald College
- 1969–1972: RPI
- 1972–1973: Boston University
- 1974–1975: Austin Mavericks
- 1975–1976: Alberta
- 1976–1979: St. Lawrence

Administrative career (AD unless noted)
- 1980–1991: Mount Allison

Head coaching record
- Overall: 87–117–7 (.429)

Leon Hedley Abbott is a former college ice hockey coach who is most remembered for being fired by Boston University six games into the 1973–74 season for violating NCAA eligibility rules.

== Career ==
Abbott was born in Edmonton and raised in Montreal. He graduated from Montreal West High School and attended McGill University from 1959 to 1964, where he played both ice hockey and football. After graduating, he was hired as a teacher and football and basketball coach at Percival High School in Val-d'Or. He was the head coach at Macdonald College for three seasons before becoming head coach at Rensselaer in 1969. He took over from Garry Kearns, and after a poor first season, returned the Engineers to winning ways with 16- and 17-win seasons, making the ECAC tournament in consecutive seasons.

Abbott received his big break in 1972 when Jack Kelley stepped away from Boston University to pursue a professional coaching career and Abbott was given the job to replace him. The Terriers were coming off back-to-back National Championships and didn't take much of a step backwards with their new bench boss, finishing the season at a 22-6-1 mark. During the offseason, two of BU's players, Peter Marzo and Bill Buckton, were declared ineligible by the ECAC for accepting small amounts of expense money while playing junior ice hockey in their native Canada. The players, supported by Abbott, challenged the decision in federal court. Judge Joseph L. Tauro granted the pair an injunction allowing them to play on the basis that the ECAC's rules were likely unconstitutional because they treated American and foreign born players differently. The ECAC held a rehearing on December 11, 1973, during which Abbott testified that he had told neither player to lie about compensation on their affidavits to the conference, but did not press them hard to divulge all compensation they had received. On December 22, 1973, Abbott was fired by BU athletic director Warren Schmakel, who stated that the hearings had made it clear that Abbott "was aware of the apparent misstatements in the affidavits and hadn't informed the university officials" which "put BU in an embarrassing position". Abbott believed he was being scapegoated because "the ECAC and NCAA want[ed] to protect their role concerning the eligibility of Junior A players, and Boston University wants to avoid censure and still keep the boys eligible. To do that, they need somebody to blame, and I guess I'm the scapegoat". He was replaced by his assistant, Jack Parker.

During the 1974–75 season, Abbott was the head coach and general manager of the Austin Mavericks. In 1975, he agreed to coach University of Alberta for one season while Clare Drake was on a leave of absence coaching the Edmonton Oilers.

In 1976, he was offered a third NCAA job, this time by St. Lawrence. The Saints had been slipping in the standings and were looking for someone to return them to their earlier glory but bringing Abbott back to Canton didn't work out as expected. In three seasons Abbott posted a record of 28-59-2, finishing well out of the conference playoffs each year. Things began to look up at the beginning of his fourth campaign as the Saints won their first three contests, but everything went south after as they dropped eight straight matches. The final straw was a 12-3 trouncing by Clarkson on December 1 after which Abbott stepped down as head coach.

From 1980 to 1991, Abbott was the athletic director at Mount Allison University in Sackville, New Brunswick, Canada. From 1988 to 1990, he was also president of the Canadian Interuniversity Athletic Union.

== Head coaching record ==
Record table
Season	Team	Overall	Conference	Standing	Postseason
Rensselaer Engineers (ECAC Hockey) (1969–1972)
1969–70	Rensselaer	8-15-1	3-13-1	15th	
1970–71	Rensselaer	16-7-2	7-5-2	8th	ECAC Quarterfinals
1971–72	Rensselaer	17-9-1	9-7-1	7th	ECAC Quarterfinals
Rensselaer:		41-31-4	19-25-4		
Boston University Terriers (ECAC Hockey) (1972–1973)
1972–73	Boston University	11-17-1^	9-8-1^	8th	ECAC Quarterfinals
1973–74	Boston University	4-2-0†	3-1-0†		
Boston University:		15-19-1	12-9-1		
St. Lawrence Saints (ECAC Hockey) (1976–1979)
1976–77	St. Lawrence	8-20-0	3-17-0	16th	
1977–78	St. Lawrence	12-18-0	8-14-0	13th	
1978–79	St. Lawrence	8-21-2	5-18-1	15th	
1979–80	St. Lawrence	3-8-0‡	0-4-0‡		
St. Lawrence:		31-67-2	16-53-1		
Total:		87-117-7			
National champion Postseason invitational champion Conference regular season champion Conference regular season and conference tournament champion Division regular season champion Division regular season and conference tournament champion Conference tournament champion

^BU forfeited 11 wins after the 1972–73 season due to an ineligible player. Record without forfeits is 22-6-1 (13-4-1 ECAC).

†BU fired Abbott on December 21, 1973. Jack Parker finished the season. BU credits the first six games of the 1973–74 season to Abbott and the remaining 25 games to Parker.

‡Abbott stepped down from his position mid-season
