= Fra Umile da Foligno =

Italian painter

Fra Umile da Foligno (active in late 17th-century) was an Italian Franciscan friar and painter active in Perugia and Rome. He was born in Foligno.

His output is sparse, all sacred subjects but includes paintings depicting events in the Life of Mary (1686-1691) in Santa Maria in Aracoeli in Rome. These include a fresco of the Visitation and Adoration by the Shepherds. He painted a Madonna altarpiece (1666) now in Palazzo del Priore in Perugia. he appears to be influenced by Antonio Maria Fabrizi.
