= Dick Umile =

Former American ice hockey coach

Biographical details
- Born: December 21, 1948 (age 77); Melrose, Massachusetts, U.S.

Playing career
- 1969–1972: New Hampshire
- Position: Forward

Coaching career (HC unless noted)
- 1975–1985: Watertown HS (MA)
- 1985–1987: Providence (assistant)
- 1988–1990: New Hampshire (assistant)
- 1990–2018: New Hampshire

Head coaching record
- Overall: 598–375–114 (.603) [college]
- Tournaments: 14–18 (.438)

Accomplishments and honors

Championships
- 1997 Hockey East regular season champion 1999 Hockey East regular season champion 2002 Hockey East regular season champion 2002 Hockey East tournament champion 2003 Hockey East regular season champion 2003 Hockey East tournament champion 2007 Hockey East regular season champion 2008 Hockey East regular season champion 2010 Hockey East regular season champion

Awards
- 1991 Bob Kullen Coach of the Year Award; 1997 Bob Kullen Coach of the Year Award; 1999 Bob Kullen Coach of the Year Award; 1999 Spencer Penrose Award; 2002 Bob Kullen Coach of the Year Award; 2007 Bob Kullen Coach of the Year Award; 2007 Italian-American Hall of Fame; 2009 New Hampshire Legends of Hockey; 2010 Bob Kullen Coach of the Year Award

Richard Umile (born December 21, 1948) is an American former men's ice hockey coach at the University of New Hampshire. Coaching the Wildcats from 1990 through the 2018 season, Umile led UNH to the most wins in school history.

== Career ==
Dick Umile was UNH’s coach from 1990 to 2018. He attended the University of New Hampshire from 1968 - 1972, and played hockey for legendary UNH coach Charlie Holt. Upon graduation, Umile began his coaching career with the Watertown (Mass.) High School Red Raiders . He was named head coach in 1975, and proceeded to rebuild the previously unsuccessful team into a state champion during the next ten years. In 1985, Umile jumped into the college ranks by becoming assistant coach to the newly appointed head coach at Providence College, former UNH teammate Mike McShane, where Dick worked for two years prior to becoming a scout for the NHL St.Louis Blues.

In 1988 Umile ran into Bob Kullen who was recovering from a recent heart transplant and was enticed to return to his alma mater as an assistant coach. Two seasons later, Kullen's health took a sudden turn for the worse and Umile was thrust into the head coaching position just prior to the 1990–91 season. The season soon became dedicated to Kullen when the former coach died on November 2 and the team responded by giving New Hampshire its first winning season in seven years. After the season, Umile was awarded with Hockey East's Coach of the Year Award, newly renamed in Bob Kullen's Honor.

The Wildcats advanced to the NCAA tournament for the first time in a decade. Four years later New Hampshire would win its first Hockey East Regular season title, and its first conference title in 23 years, behind a then-record 28-win season. Two years later the Wildcats would post their first 30-win season and marched all the way to the 1999 NCAA Championship Game before being defeated by conference rival Maine, 3-2 in overtime. New Hampshire would continue to perform strongly under Umile, returning as a semi-finalist in the 2002 NCAA Frozen Four tournament, and then making it back to the Frozen Four Championship game in 2003, where the Wildcats lost to Minnesota, 5-1.

Over the course of his 28 years at the helm, Umile coached the Wildcats to 22 winning seasons, with twenty of them having at least 20 wins. He holds the school record for most statistical categories including Frozen Four appearances (4), NCAA Tournament appearances (18), consecutive tournament appearances (10), and Conference Regular season Titles (7), and is the only coach in school history to provide conference tournament titles (2002 and 2003). For his efforts, Umile received the Bob Kullen Coach of the Year Award a record six times, as well as the Spencer Penrose Award in 1999. Dick was named to both the Italian-American Hall of Fame (2007) and the New Hampshire Legends of Hockey (2009). He retired after the 2017-18 season.

== Head coaching record ==
=== College ===
Record table
Season	Team	Overall	Conference	Standing	Postseason
New Hampshire Wildcats (Hockey East) (1990–2018)
1990-91	New Hampshire	22-11-2	10-9-2	5th	Hockey East Quarterfinals
1991-92	New Hampshire	24-11-2	15-4-2	1st†	NCAA East Regional Quarterfinals
1992-93	New Hampshire	18-17-3	11-11-2	3rd	Hockey East Consolation Game (loss)
1993-94	New Hampshire	25-12-3	13-9-2	3rd	NCAA East Regional semifinals
1994-95	New Hampshire	22-10-4	14-6-4-0	3rd	NCAA East Regional Quarterfinals
1995-96	New Hampshire	12-18-4	8-12-4-1	6th	Hockey East Quarterfinals
1996-97	New Hampshire	28-11-0	18-6-0	t-1st	NCAA East Regional Quarterfinals
1997-98	New Hampshire	25-12-1	15-8-1	3rd	NCAA Frozen Four
1998-99	New Hampshire	31-7-3	18-3-3	1st	NCAA runner-up
1999-00	New Hampshire	23-9-6	13-5-6	2nd	NCAA West Regional Quarterfinals
2000-01	New Hampshire	21-12-6	13-8-5	4th	Hockey East Quarterfinals
2001-02	New Hampshire	30-7-3	17-4-3	1st	NCAA Frozen Four
2002-03	New Hampshire	28-8-6	15-5-4	1st	NCAA runner-up
2003-04	New Hampshire	20-15-6	10-8-6	4th	NCAA Northeast Regional semifinals
2004-05	New Hampshire	26-11-5	15-5-4	t-2nd	NCAA Northeast Regional final
2005-06	New Hampshire	20-13-7	14-7-6	4th	NCAA East Regional semifinals
2006-07	New Hampshire	26-11-2	18-7-2	1st	NCAA Northeast Regional semifinals
2007-08	New Hampshire	25-10-3	19-5-3	1st	NCAA West Regional semifinals
2008-09	New Hampshire	20-13-5	15-8-4	3rd	NCAA Northeast Regional final
2009-10	New Hampshire	18-14-7	15-6-6	1st	NCAA East Regional final
2010-11	New Hampshire	22-11-6	17-6-4	2nd	NCAA Northeast Regional final
2011-12	New Hampshire	15-19-3	11-14-2	6th	Hockey East Quarterfinals
2012-13	New Hampshire	20-12-7	13-8-6	t-3rd	NCAA Northeast Regional final
2013-14	New Hampshire	22-18-1	11-9-0	t-4th	Hockey East runner-up
2014-15	New Hampshire	19-19-2	10-11-1	8th	Hockey East Semi-Finals
2015-16	New Hampshire	11-20-6	4-12-6	10th	Hockey East first round
2016-17	New Hampshire	15-20-5	7-10-4	10th	Hockey East Quarterfinals
2017-18	New Hampshire	10-20-6	5-14-5	11th	Hockey East Opening Round
New Hampshire:		598-375-114	326-220-90		
Total:		598-375-114			
National champion Postseason invitational champion Conference regular season champion Conference regular season and conference tournament champion Division regular season champion Division regular season and conference tournament champion Conference tournament champion

† Maine was required to forfeit 13 games after the conclusion of the season and subsequently dropped from 1st place to 3rd, though they are still considered league champions for the year

== See also ==
- List of college men's ice hockey coaches with 400 wins

Awards and achievements
Preceded by Shawn Walsh; Bruce Crowder; Bruce Crowder; Paul Pooley; Jack Parker; Greg Cronin	Bob Kullen Coach of the Year Award; 1990–91; 1996–97; 1998–99; 2001–02; 2006–07; 2009–10 (With Mark Dennehy)	Succeeded by Jack Parker; Bruce Crowder; Jack Parker; Don Cahoon; Kevin Sneddon; Jerry York
Preceded by Tim Taylor	Spencer Penrose Award; 1998–99	Succeeded by Joe Marsh
