= Chris Imes =

American ice hockey player (born 1972)

- Born: August 27, 1972 (age 53) Birchdale, Minnesota, U.S.
- Height: 5 ft 10 in (178 cm)
- Weight: 187 lb (85 kg; 13 st 5 lb)
- Position: Defense
- Shot: Right
- Played for: HK Olimpija; Anchorage Aces; Minnesota Moose
- National team: United States
- NHL draft: 1993 NHL Supplemental Draft; Florida Panthers
- Playing career: 1995–2000

Chris Imes (born August 27, 1972) is an American former ice hockey player. He played for HK Olimpija, the Anchorage Aces, and the Minnesota Moose during his career. He also played for the American national team at the 1994 Winter Olympics and 1995 World Championships.

Imes played for the University of Maine Black Bears from 1990 to 1995. During his freshman and sophomore year at the University of Maine, Imes won the Shawn Walsh Defensive Player Award twice and helped guide Maine to their first NCAA Championship in 1992–93. In his senior year, Imes was a runner up for the Hobey Baker Award and was named the Hockey East Player of the Year in 1995. He was inducted into the University of Maine Sports Hall of Fame in 2003.

After retiring, Imes joined the Chicago Blues youth hockey organization as a director and became a local physical education teacher.

== Career statistics ==
=== Regular season and playoffs ===
			Regular season					Playoffs
Season	Team	League	GP	G	A	Pts	PIM	GP	G	A	Pts	PIM
1990–91	University of Maine	HE	37	6	8	14	16	—	—	—	—	—
1991–92	University of Maine	HE	31	4	19	23	22	—	—	—	—	—
1992–93	University of Maine	HE	45	12	23	35	24	—	—	—	—	—
1994–95	University of Maine	HE	43	4	29	33	18	—	—	—	—	—
1994–95	Manitoba Moose	IHL	2	0	0	0	4	3	0	0	0	0
1995–96	Manitoba Moose	IHL	80	4	14	18	56	—	—	—	—	—
1996–97	Anchorage Aces	WCHL	7	3	3	6	4	9	1	3	4	24
1997–98	HK Olimpija Ljubljana	SVN
1998–99	HK Olimpija Ljubljana	SVN	33	5	16	21	20	—	—	—	—	—
1999–2000	HK Olimpija Ljubljana	SVN	31	7	9	16	42	—	—	—	—	—
HE totals			156	26	79	105	80	—	—	—	—	—
IHL totals			82	4	14	18	60	3	0	0	0	0

=== International ===
Year	Team	Event	GP	G	A	Pts	PIM
1991	United States	WJC	7	0	2	2	0
1992	United States	WJC	7	1	0	1	0
1994	United States	OG	8	0	0	0	2
1995	United States	WC	6	1	0	1	0
Junior totals			14	1	2	3	0
Senior totals			14	1	0	1	2

== Awards and honors ==
Award	Year
All-Hockey East Second Team	1991–92
Hockey East All-Tournament Team	1992, 1993, 1995
All-Hockey East First Team	1992–93
AHCA East First-Team All-American	1992–93
All-NCAA All-Tournament Team	1993, 1995
All-Hockey East All-Star	1994–95
AHCA East First-Team All-American	1994–95
