= Mike Dunham =

American ice hockey player (born 1972)

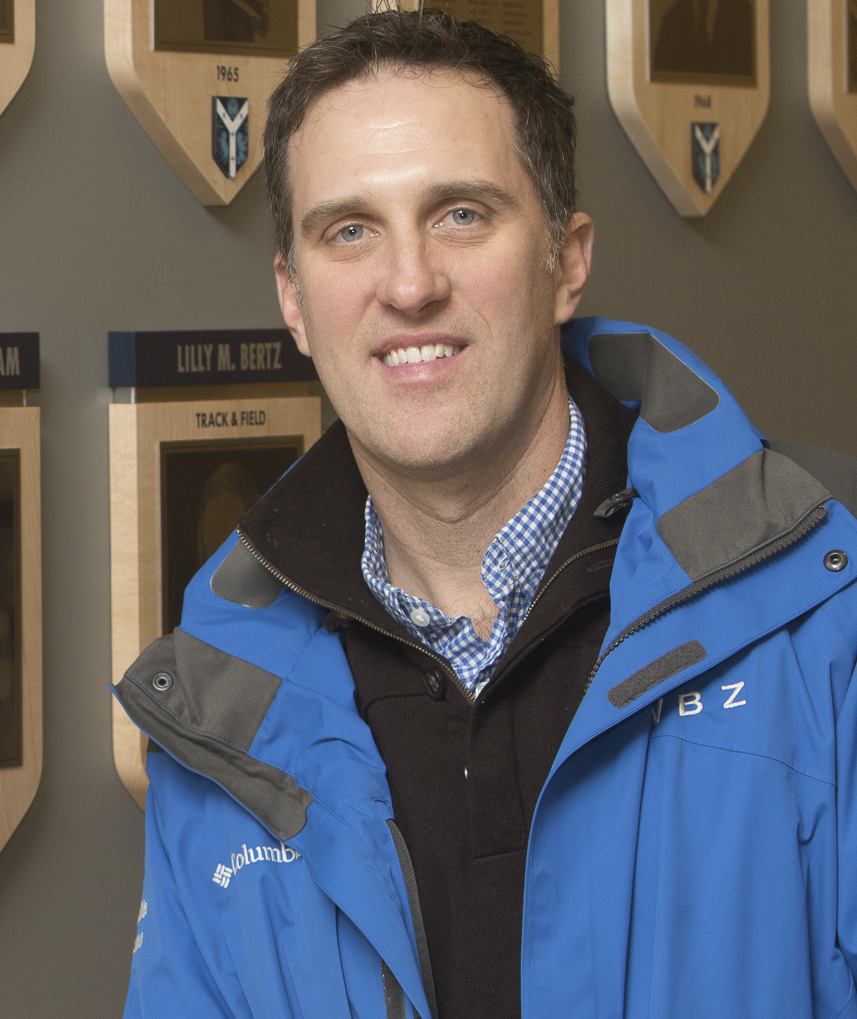
- Dunham in 2016
- Born: June 1, 1972 (age 54) Johnson City, New York, U.S.
- Height: 6 ft 2 in (188 cm)
- Weight: 190 lb (86 kg; 13 st 8 lb)
- Position: Goaltender
- Caught: Left
- Played for: New Jersey Devils; Nashville Predators; New York Rangers; Atlanta Thrashers; New York Islanders
- National team: United States
- NHL draft: 53rd overall, 1990; New Jersey Devils
- Playing career: 1993–2007

Michael Francis Dunham (born June 1, 1972) is an American former professional ice hockey goaltender. Dunham is the Boston Bruins goalie development coach, and the former head goaltending coach for the New York Islanders of the National Hockey League (NHL).

== Playing career ==
Dunham attended Maine-Endwell High School for one year before transferring to Canterbury School in New Milford, Connecticut, a Catholic boarding school, where he was an All-New England 1st Team Goalie under legendary prep school coach Charlie Huntington. Dunham played college hockey for the University of Maine, where he shared the goaltending duties with Garth Snow. The team won the NCAA Men's Ice Hockey Championship in Dunham's final season, 1992–93.

Dunham was drafted in the third round (53rd overall) of the 1990 NHL entry draft by the New Jersey Devils. He won the Calder Cup in 1995 with the Albany River Rats. He was co-winner of the William M. Jennings Trophy with Martin Brodeur for the 1996–97 NHL season. During the 1998 NHL expansion draft, Dunham was selected by the Nashville Predators, with whom he played four seasons, sharing the starting role with Tomáš Vokoun. He also played for the New York Rangers, Atlanta Thrashers, and New York Islanders. He participated in the 2002 Winter Olympic Games, helping the United States win the silver medal. During the 2004–05 NHL lockout, Dunham played with Skellefteå AIK in Sweden.

== Coaching ==
On September 10, 2007, Dunham was named goaltending coach of the New York Islanders. The move ended his 11-year NHL playing career. He left the Islanders in July 2017 after 10 years to become the Boston Bruins goalie development coach in August 2017.

== Career statistics ==
=== Regular season and playoffs ===
			Regular season										Playoffs
Season	Team	League	GP	W	L	T	OTL	MIN	GA	SO	GAA	SV%	GP	W	L	MIN	GA	SO	GAA	SV%
1987–88	Canterbury School	High-CT	29	—	—	—	—	1740	69	4	2.38	—	—	—	—	—	—	—	—	—
1988–89	Canterbury School	High-CT	25	—	—	—	—	1500	63	2	2.52	—	—	—	—	—	—	—	—	—
1989–90	Canterbury School	High-CT	32	—	—	—	—	1558	68	3	2.62	—	—	—	—	—	—	—	—	—
1990–91	University of Maine	HE	23	14	5	2	—	1275	63	0	2.96	—	—	—	—	—	—	—	—	—
1991–92	University of Maine	HE	7	6	0	0	—	382	14	1	2.20	—	—	—	—	—	—	—	—	—
1991–92	United States	Intl	3	0	1	1	—	157	10	0	3.82	—	—	—	—	—	—	—	—	—
1992–93	University of Maine	HE	25	21	1	1	—	1429	63	0	2.65	—	—	—	—	—	—	—	—	—
1993–94	United States	Intl	33	22	9	2	—	1983	125	2	3.78	—	—	—	—	—	—	—	—	—
1993–94	Albany River Rats	AHL	5	2	2	1	—	304	26	0	5.13	.858	—	—	—	—	—	—	—	—
1994–95	Albany River Rats	AHL	35	20	7	8	—	2120	99	1	2.80	.898	7	6	1	419	20	1	2.86	—
1995–96	Albany River Rats	AHL	44	30	10	2	—	2592	109	1	2.52	.908	3	1	2	182	5	1	1.65	—
1996–97	New Jersey Devils	NHL	26	8	7	1	—	1013	43	2	2.55	.906	—	—	—	—	—	—	—	—
1996–97	Albany River Rats	AHL	3	1	1	1	—	184	12	0	3.91	.871	—	—	—	—	—	—	—	—
1997–98	New Jersey Devils	NHL	15	5	5	3	—	773	29	1	2.25	.913	—	—	—	—	—	—	—	—
1998–99	Nashville Predators	NHL	44	16	23	3	—	2472	127	1	3.08	.908	—	—	—	—	—	—	—	—
1999–2000	Nashville Predators	NHL	52	19	27	6	—	3077	146	0	2.85	.908	—	—	—	—	—	—	—	—
1999–2000	Milwaukee Admirals	IHL	1	1	0	0	—	60	1	0	1.00	.933	—	—	—	—	—	—	—	—
2000–01	Nashville Predators	NHL	48	21	21	4	—	2810	107	4	2.28	.923	—	—	—	—	—	—	—	—
2001–02	Nashville Predators	NHL	58	23	24	9	—	3316	144	3	2.61	.906	—	—	—	—	—	—	—	—
2002–03	Nashville Predators	NHL	15	2	9	2	—	819	43	0	3.15	.892	—	—	—	—	—	—	—	—
2002–03	New York Rangers	NHL	43	19	17	5	—	2467	94	5	2.29	.924	—	—	—	—	—	—	—	—
2003–04	New York Rangers	NHL	57	16	30	6	—	3148	159	2	3.03	.896	—	—	—	—	—	—	—	—
2004–05	Skellefteå AIK	Allsv	13	—	—	—	—	726	36	4	2.98	—	—	—	—	—	—	—	—	—
2005–06	Atlanta Thrashers	NHL	17	8	5	—	2	779	36	1	2.77	.893	—	—	—	—	—	—	—	—
2005–06	Gwinnett Gladiators	ECHL	2	2	0	—	0	120	5	0	2.50	.861	—	—	—	—	—	—	—	—
2006–07	New York Islanders	NHL	19	4	10	—	3	979	61	0	3.74	.889	—	—	—	—	—	—	—	—
NHL totals			394	141	178	39	5	21,653	989	19	2.74	.908	—	—	—	—	—	—	—	—

=== International ===
Medal record

Representing United States

Winter Olympics
Silver medal – second place	2002 Salt Lake City	

World Championships
Bronze medal – third place	2004 Czech Republic	

World Junior Championships
Bronze medal – third place	1992 Germany	

Year	Team	Event	GP	W	L	T	MIN	GA	SO	GAA	SV%
1991	United States	WJC	3	1	2	0	180	11	0	3.67	—
1992	United States	WJC	6	5	0	1	360	14	—	2.33	—
1992	United States	WC	3	0	1	0	107	7	0	3.93	—
1993	United States	WC	1	1	0	0	60	1	0	1.00	—
1994	United States	OG	3	0	1	2	180	15	0	5.00	.826
1998	United States	WC	2	0	1	0	40	4	0	6.00	—
2002	United States	OG	1	1	0	0	60	0	1	0.00	1.000
2004	United States	WC	4	1	3	0	237	10	0	2.53	.915
Junior totals			9	6	2	1	540	25	0	2.78	—
Senior totals			14	3	6	2	684	37	1	3.25	—

== Awards and honors ==
Award	Year
All-Hockey East First Team	1992–93
AHCA East First-Team All-American	1992–93
Calder Cup Champion (Albany River Rats)	1994-95

- Binghamton Hockey Hall Of Fame. Inducted Friday March 13, 2009 (w/Glenn Merkosky)

Awards and achievements
Preceded by Byron Dafoe and Olaf Kölzig	Winner of the Hap Holmes Memorial Award; 1994–95 (w/Corey Schwab)	Succeeded by Manny Legace and Scott Langkow
Preceded by Chris Osgood and Mike Vernon	Winner of the William M. Jennings Trophy; 1996–97 (w/Martin Brodeur)	Succeeded by Martin Brodeur
