= Hamel Recreation Center =

Indoor multipurpose facility in Durham, New Hampshire

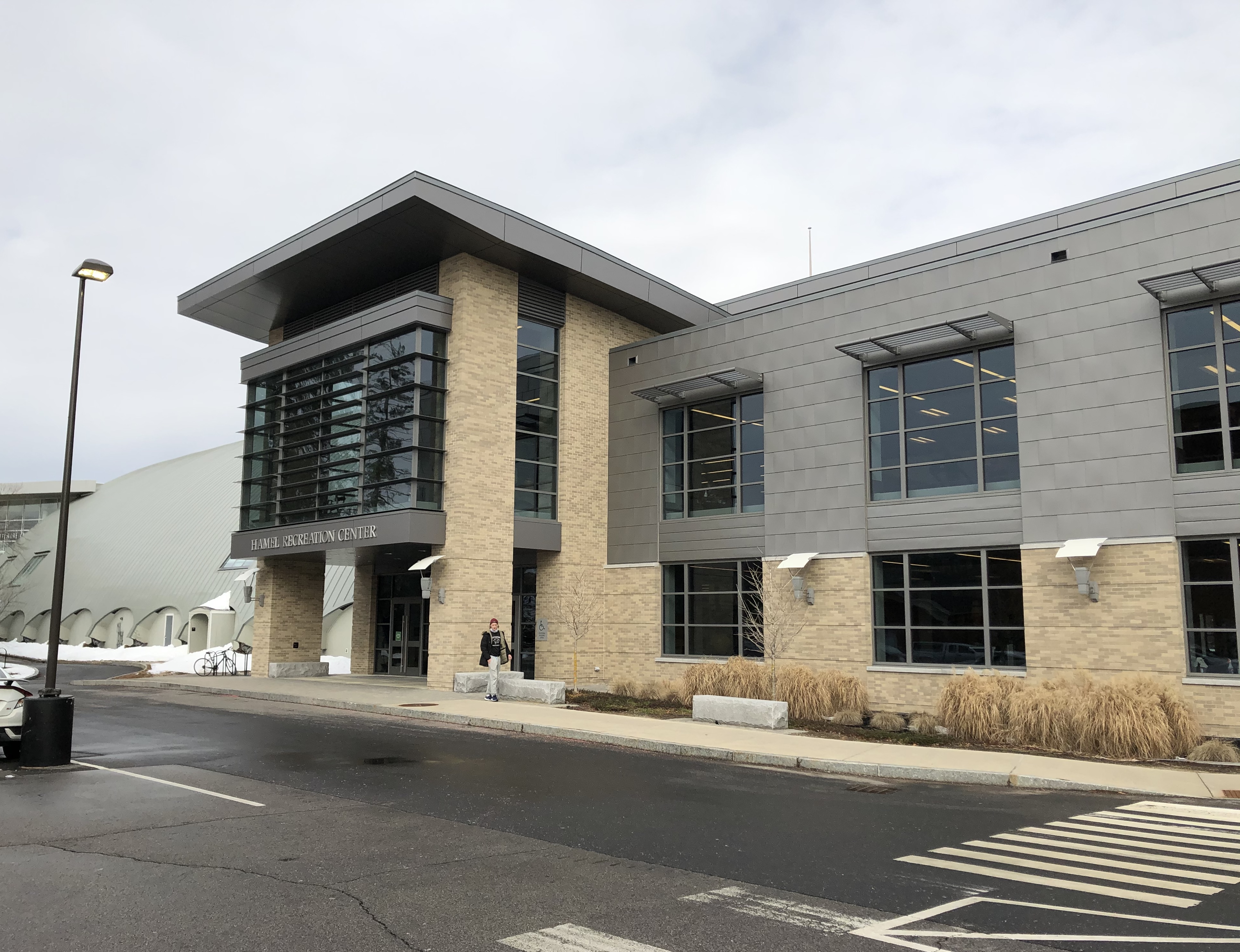
- Interactive map of Hamel Recreation Center
- Former names: Snively Arena (1965-1995)
- Location: 5 Edgewood Rd. Durham, New Hampshire 03824
- Coordinates: 43°8′20″N 70°56′0″W
- Owner: University of New Hampshire
- Operator: University of New Hampshire
- Surface: multiple

Construction
- Opened: 1965 (60–61 years ago)

Tenant
- New Hampshire Wildcats ice hockey (1965-1995)

The Hamel Recreation Center (formerly the Snively Arena) is an indoor multipurpose facility located in Durham, New Hampshire, United States. It was the home of the New Hampshire varsity ice hockey team from 1965 to 1995. It is currently used by UNH as a recreation building for students and faculty and possesses basketball, squash and racquetball courts, a cycling studio, and a sauna, among several other facilities.

== History ==
The Snively arena was completed in 1965 and dedicated in honor of A. Barr Snively, a long-time coach at Brown University, Williams College, and UNH who had died from a heart attack the year before. Initially the arena's main purpose was to house the men's ice hockey team, which had been using an outdoor artificial ice rink for the preceding ten years. The arena allowed UNH to rejoin ECAC Hockey, which it had been forced to leave in 1964, and return its program to the top echelon of college hockey.

The arena was the home of the ice hockey team for 30 years before being replaced by the Whittemore Center in 1995. After the hockey team moved out, the arena was renovated, expanded and renamed to become the Hamel Recreation Center, in honor of university benefactor Dana Hamel. The building was further expanded in 2016 to include more athletic courts and fitness amenities.
