= Chelmsford Forum =

Sport and concert venue in Billerica, Massachusetts, United States

Coordinates: 42°35′19.80″N 71°18′28.10″W

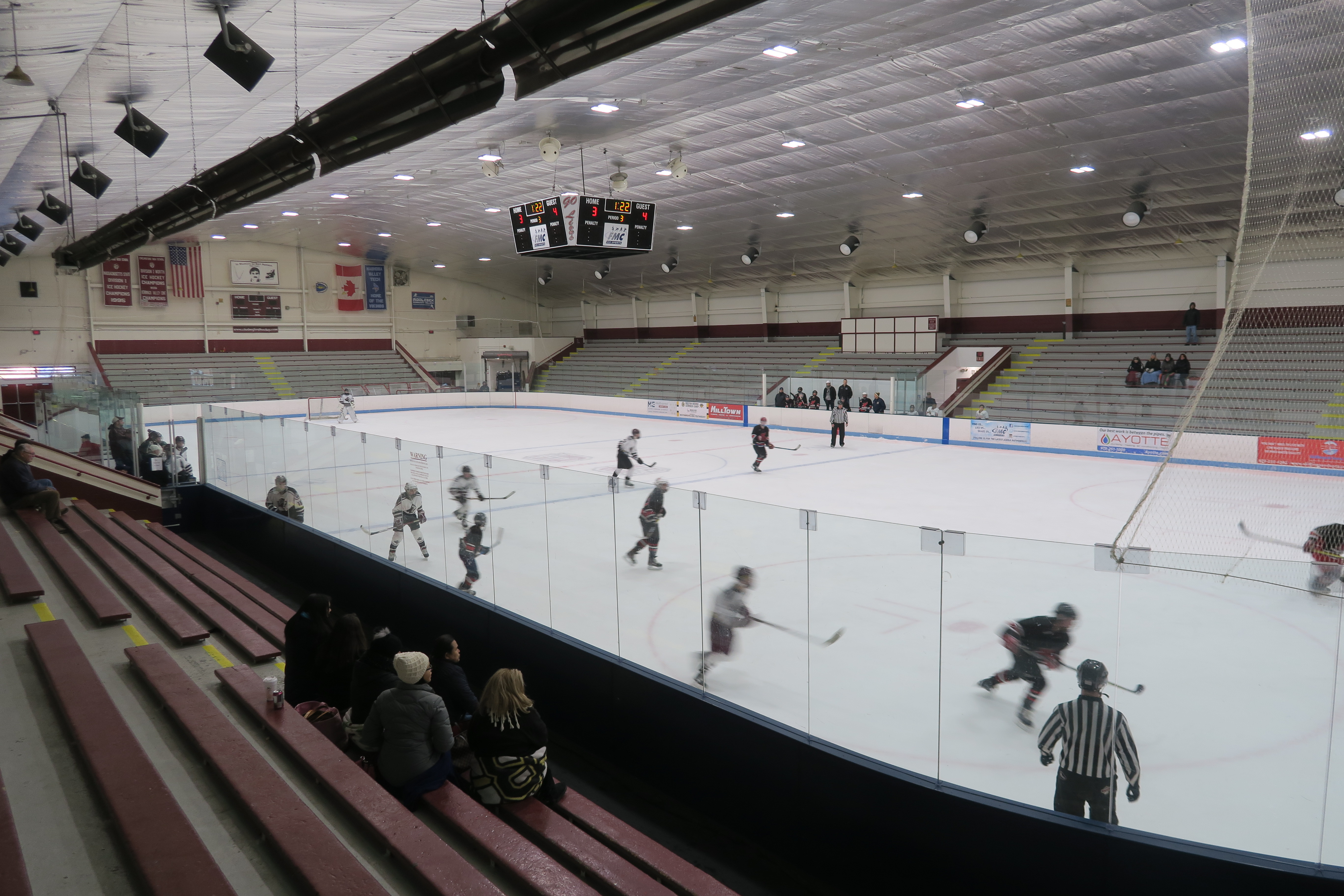
- Interactive map of Chelmsford Forum
- Former names: Tully Forum; Billerica Forum; Merrimack Valley Forum
- Location: 2 Brick Kiln Road; North Billerica, Massachusetts 01862 USA
- Capacity: 3500

Construction
- Opened: 1964

Tenants
- UMass Lowell River Hawks (NCAA) (1980-January 27, 1998); Chelmsford High School; Nashoba Valley Technical High School; Lowell Catholic High School; New England Bobcats (AAL) (2018)

The Chelmsford Forum is a multi-use indoor sport and concert venue, actually located in Billerica, Massachusetts, United States, just across the town line of Chelmsford, Massachusetts. The venue was formerly home to the UMass Lowell River Hawks, during which time the team won two NCAA Division II national championships (1981 and 1982). It is currently home to the ice hockey teams from Chelmsford High School, the Chelmsford Hockey Association, and Tech Hockey (a co-op team made up of Nashoba tech, Greater Lowell tech, and Greater Lawerence tech) as well as some of Lowell Catholic's games. The rink is owned by the town of Chelmsford, but currently managed by Valley Rinks, having previously been managed by FMC Ice Sports (1997–2018).

The arena was formerly named for state senator B. Joseph Tully.

Preceded by Skate 3	Home of the UMass Lowell River Hawks; 1980-1998	Succeeded by Tsongas Center
