= Antonio Maria Fabrizi =

Italian painter

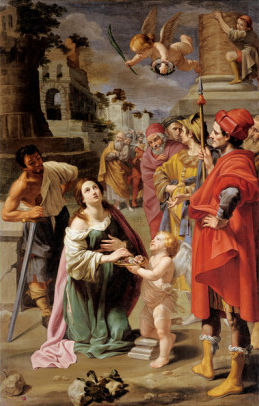
Martyrdom of St. Dorothy, 1630

Anton or Antonio Maria Fabrizi or Fabrizzi (1594–1649) was an Italian painter, active in Perugia and Foligno in a Baroque style.

== Biography ==
Luigi Lanzi identifies him as a pupil of Ludovico Carracci in Bologna. Fabrizi painted the counterfacade fresco of the Madonna and Child with Saints Constantius, Dominic, Catherine of Siena and Herculanus (1644) at San Domenico in Perugia. he also painted the canvases (Martyrdom of St Dorothy and Saints Cecilia and Valerian) in the Chapel of the Rosary in the same church; the frescoes by him in this chapel were destroyed in 1956. He also painted (1642) for the church of Santa Lucia in Foligno.
