= Matt Martin (ice hockey, born 1971) =

American ice hockey player

- Born: April 30, 1971 (age 55) Hamden, Connecticut, U.S.
- Height: 6 ft 3 in (191 cm)
- Weight: 205 lb (93 kg; 14 st 9 lb)
- Position: Defense
- Shot: Left
- Played for: Toronto Maple Leafs
- National team: United States
- NHL draft: 66th overall, 1989; Toronto Maple Leafs
- Playing career: 1992–2003

Matthew Martin (born April 30, 1971) is an American former professional ice hockey defenseman. He played for the Toronto Maple Leafs of the National Hockey League. Martin was a member of Team USA during the 1994 Winter Olympics.

== Career ==
Martin played for Avon Old Farms from 1988 to 1990 and the University of Maine from 1990 to 1993. He was chosen 66th overall by the Toronto Maple Leafs in the 1989 NHL entry draft. Martin would go on to play a total of 76 games with the club, recording five assists and 71 penalty minutes. He retired in 2003.

== Personal life ==
Martin and his wife, Deanne, have two sons, Bennett and Cale.

== Career statistics ==
=== Regular season and playoffs ===
			Regular season					Playoffs
Season	Team	League	GP	G	A	Pts	PIM	GP	G	A	Pts	PIM
1987–88	South Connecticut Selects	MBHL	23	3	7	10		—	—	—	—	—
1988–89	Avon Old Farms	HS-Prep	25	9	23	32		—	—	—	—	—
1990–91	University of Maine	HE	35	3	12	15	48	—	—	—	—	—
1991–92	University of Maine	HE	30	4	14	18	46	—	—	—	—	—
1992–93	University of Maine	HE	44	6	26	32	88	—	—	—	—	—
1992–93	St. John's Maple Leafs	AHL	2	0	0	0	2	9	1	5	6	4
1993–94	United States	Intl	39	7	8	15	127	—	—	—	—	—
1993–94	Toronto Maple Leafs	NHL	12	0	1	1	6	—	—	—	—	—
1993–94	St. John's Maple Leafs	AHL	12	1	5	6	9	11	1	5	6	33
1994–95	St. John's Maple Leafs	AHL	49	2	16	18	54	—	—	—	—	—
1994–95	Toronto Maple Leafs	NHL	15	0	0	0	13	—	—	—	—	—
1995–96	Toronto Maple Leafs	NHL	13	0	0	0	14	—	—	—	—	—
1996–97	Toronto Maple Leafs	NHL	36	0	4	4	38	—	—	—	—	—
1996–97	St. John's Maple Leafs	AHL	12	1	3	4	4	—	—	—	—	—
1997–98	Chicago Wolves	IHL	78	7	22	29	95	19	0	5	5	24
1998–99	Michigan K-Wings	IHL	76	3	12	15	114	5	0	0	0	10
1999–2000	Michigan K-Wings	IHL	76	0	11	11	66	—	—	—	—	—
2000–01	Idaho Steelheads	WCHL	62	6	30	36	60	11	3	5	8	14
2002–03	Idaho Steelheads	WCHL	14	0	2	2	14	—	—	—	—	—
NHL totals			76	0	5	5	71	—	—	—	—	—
IHL totals			230	10	45	55	275	24	0	5	5	34

=== International ===
Year	Team	Event	GP	G	A	Pts	PIM
1994	United States	OG	8	0	2	2	8
1997	United States	WC	8	0	0	0	0
Senior totals			16	0	2	2	8
