= Garth Snow =

American ice hockey player (born 1969)

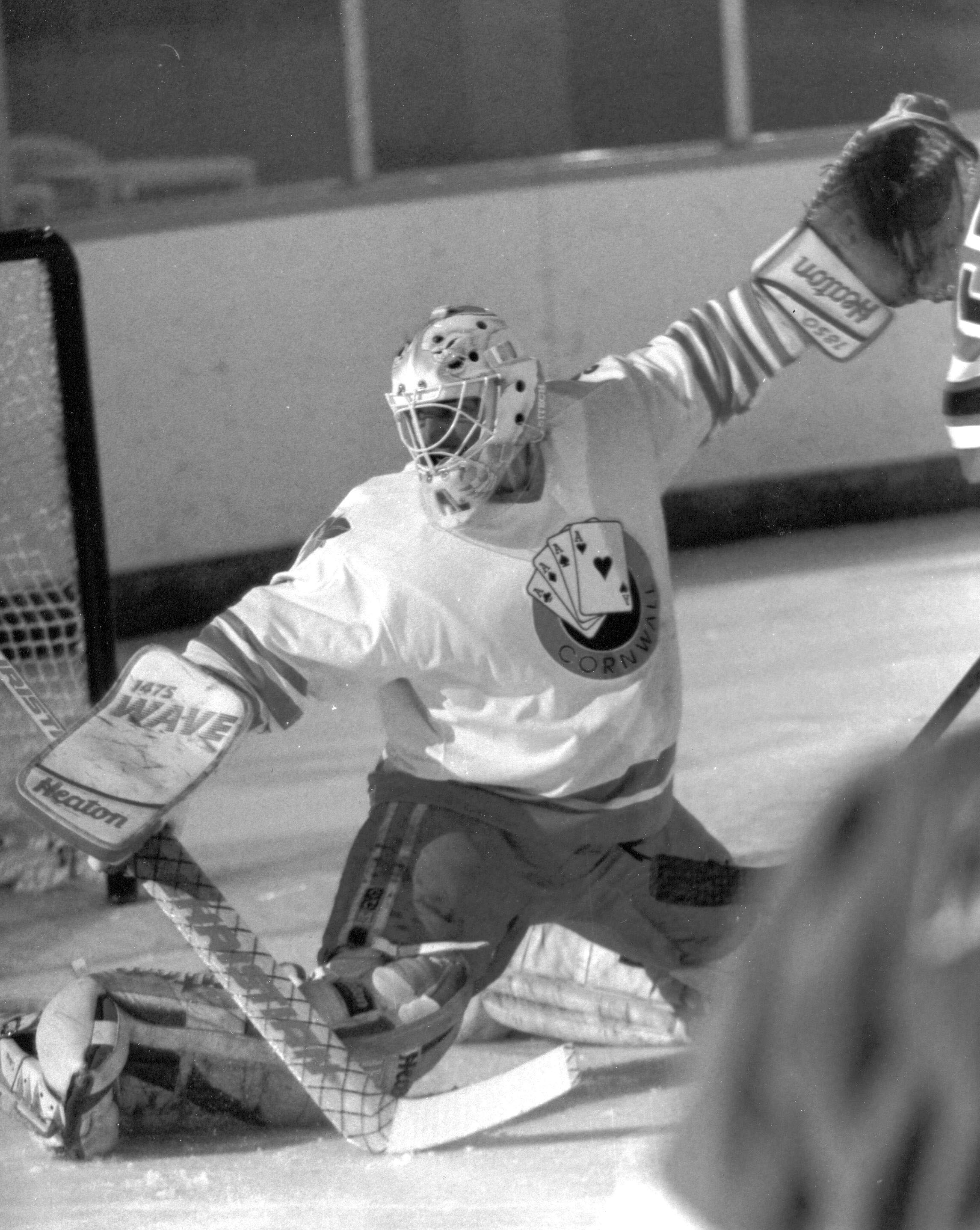
- Born: July 28, 1969 (age 56) Wrentham, Massachusetts, U.S.
- Height: 6 ft 3 in (191 cm)
- Weight: 200 lb (91 kg; 14 st 4 lb)
- Position: Goaltender
- Caught: Left
- Played for: Quebec Nordiques; Philadelphia Flyers; Vancouver Canucks; Pittsburgh Penguins; New York Islanders; SKA St. Petersburg
- National team: United States
- NHL draft: 114th overall, 1987; Quebec Nordiques
- Playing career: 1994–2006

Garth E. Snow (born July 28, 1969) is an American former professional ice hockey goaltender and former general manager, president, and alternate governor of the New York Islanders of the NHL.

Drafted by the Quebec Nordiques in the sixth round of the 1987 NHL entry draft, Snow began his NHL career in the 1993–94 season, playing for the Nordiques. He also played for the Philadelphia Flyers, Vancouver Canucks, Pittsburgh Penguins, and New York Islanders, with whom he retired after the 2005–06 season. He was inducted into the Rhode Island Hockey Hall of Fame in 2019.

== Playing career ==
Snow was drafted by the Quebec Nordiques out of Mount Saint Charles Academy in the sixth round of the 1987 NHL entry draft. He attended the University of Maine for four years, leading the National Collegiate Athletic Association (NCAA) in wins for three consecutive seasons. After helping lead the team to a 42–1–2 record and the NCAA Championship in 1993, he was named to the All-Tournament team. After spending the majority of the 1993–94 playing for the United States, including participating in the 1994 Winter Olympics, he began his professional career, appearing in five games for the Nordiques.

Snow recorded 32 wins in 62 games for the Cornwall Aces of the AHL during the 1994–95. After the Quebec franchise relocated to become the Colorado Avalanche, Snow was traded to the Philadelphia Flyers for two draft picks during the offseason. Snow served as the backup goaltender to veteran Ron Hextall for over two seasons, sharing playing time with Hextall during the Flyers' run to the Stanley Cup Final in the 1996–97, notably playing in Game 2 of the Finals. Near the trade deadline in the 1997–98, he was traded to the Vancouver Canucks for Sean Burke.

As a Canuck in the 1998–99 season, he registered career highs in games played (65), wins (20), and shutouts (6). His workload was reduced the following season, and he signed with the Pittsburgh Penguins prior to the 2000–01 season. His tenure in Pittsburgh lasted one season before he signed with the New York Islanders in the offseason. He played for the Islanders for the remainder of his career, primarily serving as a backup to veteran Chris Osgood and later youngster Rick DiPietro.

Throughout his career, Snow's goaltending equipment, particularly his shoulder pads, was scrutinized by the league office on several occasions due to opposing teams alleging they violated NHL size rules. According to former teammate Michael Peca, Snow was known for his trash-talking: "He's got such a wit and sense of humor like no other. Snow says things that will cut you without being rude or obnoxious." Snow was regarded as a respected leader both on and off the ice.

== Executive career ==
On July 18, 2006, Snow officially confirmed his retirement and was named general manager of the New York Islanders following Neil Smith's dismissal after 41 days on the job. The decision to fire a Stanley Cup-winning general manager after a short tenure in favor of Snow, who had no prior management experience, drew criticism. Supporters of the organization noted Snow's master's degree in administration and bachelor's degree in business administration from the University of Maine.

In his first season as general manager, Snow was credited with making moves to create salary cap space and using it to trade for Marc-André Bergeron, Richard Zedník, and Ryan Smyth. Snow was named NHL Executive of the Year for 2006–07 by Sports Illustrated. Early in his tenure, Snow signed goaltender Rick DiPietro to a 15-year, $67.5 million contract which is widely considered one of the worst NHL signings ever, as DiPietro only played 175 games after signing this contract. On November 15, 2010, Snow fired head coach Scott Gordon and promoted Jack Capuano to interim head coach after the Islanders started the 2010–11 season with a 4–10–3 record through their first 17 games. Capuano subsequently guided the Islanders to their first playoff series win since the 1993 during the 2016 playoffs. On January 17, 2017, Snow fired Capuano and promoted Doug Weight to interim head coach in response to the Islanders' 17–17–8 record through 42 games of the 2016–17 season, which placed them last in the Eastern Conference at that time. Through the 2018, his tenure with the Islanders saw the team accrue 11 playoff wins.

On June 5, 2018, Snow's position as Islanders' general manager was terminated, although he remained with the organization through 2019.

== Career statistics ==
=== Regular season and playoffs ===
			Regular season										Playoffs
Season	Team	League	GP	W	L	T	OTL	MIN	GA	SO	GAA	SV%	GP	W	L	MIN	GA	SO	GAA	SV%
1986–87	Mount St. Charles Academy	HSRI	30	—	—	—	—	1,795	53	10	1.77	—	—	—	—	—	—	—	—	—
1987–88	Stratford Cullitons	MWJHL	30	20	6	0	—	1,642	93	2	3.40	—	—	—	—	—	—	—	—	—
1988–89	University of Maine	HE	5	2	2	0	—	241	14	1	3.49	—	—	—	—	—	—	—	—	—
1990–91	University of Maine	HE	25	18	4	0	—	1,290	64	2	2.98	.879	—	—	—	—	—	—	—	—
1991–92	University of Maine	HE	31	25	4	0	—	1,792	73	2	2.44	.883	—	—	—	—	—	—	—	—
1992–93	University of Maine	HE	23	21	0	1	—	1,210	42	1	2.08	—	—	—	—	—	—	—	—	—
1993–94	United States	Intl	23	13	5	3	—	1,324	71	1	3.22	—	—	—	—	—	—	—	—	—
1993–94	Cornwall Aces	AHL	16	6	5	3	—	927	51	0	3.30	.891	13	8	5	790	42	0	3.19	—
1993–94	Quebec Nordiques	NHL	5	3	2	0	—	279	16	0	3.44	.874	—	—	—	—	—	—	—	—
1994–95	Cornwall Aces	AHL	62	32	20	7	—	3,558	162	3	2.73	.900	8	4	3	402	14	2	2.09	—
1994–95	Quebec Nordiques	NHL	2	1	1	0	—	119	11	0	5.55	.825	1	0	0	9	1	0	6.78	.667
1995–96	Philadelphia Flyers	NHL	26	12	8	4	—	1,437	69	0	2.88	.894	1	0	0	1	0	0	0.00	—
1996–97	Philadelphia Flyers	NHL	35	14	8	8	—	1,884	79	2	2.52	.903	12	8	4	699	33	0	2.83	.892
1997–98	Philadelphia Flyers	NHL	29	14	9	4	—	1,651	67	1	2.43	.902	—	—	—	—	—	—	—	—
1997–98	Vancouver Canucks	NHL	12	3	6	0	—	504	26	0	3.10	.901	—	—	—	—	—	—	—	—
1998–99	Vancouver Canucks	NHL	65	20	31	8	—	3,501	171	6	2.93	.900	—	—	—	—	—	—	—	—
1999–00	Vancouver Canucks	NHL	32	10	15	3	—	1,712	76	0	2.66	.902	—	—	—	—	—	—	—	—
2000–01	Wilkes–Barre/Scranton Penguins	AHL	3	2	1	0	—	178	7	0	2.36	.920	—	—	—	—	—	—	—	—
2000–01	Pittsburgh Penguins	NHL	35	14	15	4	—	2,032	101	3	2.98	.900	—	—	—	—	—	—	—	—
2001–02	New York Islanders	NHL	25	10	7	2	—	1,217	55	2	2.71	.900	1	0	0	26	2	0	4.71	.895
2002–03	New York Islanders	NHL	43	16	17	5	—	2,390	92	1	2.31	.918	5	1	4	305	12	0	2.36	.910
2003–04	New York Islanders	NHL	39	14	15	5	—	2,015	94	1	2.80	.899	—	—	—	—	—	—	—	—
2004–05	SKA St. Petersburg	RSL	16	—	—	—	—	893	41	1	2.75	—	—	—	—	—	—	—	—	—
2005–06	New York Islanders	NHL	20	4	13	—	1	1,096	68	0	3.72	.886	—	—	—	—	—	—	—	—
2005–06	Bridgeport Sound Tigers	AHL	1	1	0	—	0	60	1	0	1.00	.967	—	—	—	—	—	—	—	—
NHL totals			368	135	147	43	1	19,837	925	16	2.80	.900	20	9	8	1039	48	1	2.77	.896

=== International ===
Year	Team	Event	GP	W	L	T	MIN	GA	SO	GAA	SV%
1994	United States	OG	5	1	3	1	299	17	0	3.41	.881
1998	United States	WC	5	1	2	1	260	12	0	2.77	.865
Senior totals			10	2	5	2	559	29	0	3.11	—

== Awards and honors ==
Award	Year
All-Hockey East Second Team	1991–92
All-Hockey East Second Team	1992–93
Hockey East All-Tournament Team	1993
All-NCAA All-Tournament Team	1993
Bob Nystrom Award	2003

Sporting positions
Preceded by Neil Smith	General manager of the New York Islanders; 2006–2018	Succeeded by Lou Lamoriello
Awards and achievements
Preceded by Derek Heriofsky	Hockey East Goaltending Champion; 1992–93	Succeeded by Derek Heriofsky
