= Jim Montgomery (ice hockey) =

Canadian ice hockey player and coach (born 1969)

- Born: June 30, 1969 (age 57) Montreal, Quebec, Canada
- Height: 5 ft 11 in (180 cm)
- Weight: 170 lb (77 kg; 12 st 2 lb)
- Position: Centre
- Shot: Right
- Played for: St. Louis Blues; Montreal Canadiens; Philadelphia Flyers; San Jose Sharks; Dallas Stars
- Current NHL coach: St. Louis Blues
- Coached for: Dallas Stars; Boston Bruins
- NHL draft: Undrafted
- Playing career: 1993–2005
- Coaching career: 2005–present

Jim Montgomery (born June 30, 1969) is a Canadian professional ice hockey coach and former player who is the head coach for the St. Louis Blues of the National Hockey League (NHL). Originally undrafted by teams in the NHL, he played a total of six seasons for the Blues, Montreal Canadiens, Philadelphia Flyers, San Jose Sharks, and Dallas Stars.

== Playing career ==
Montgomery played for the Cégep de Saint-Laurent Patriotes in Montreal in 1987–88, before joining the Pembroke Lumber Kings, junior A hockey team in the Central Canada Hockey League in 1988–89. The following season he joined the University of Maine and played four years with the team, winning numerous awards and establishing himself as one of the best prospects in ice hockey. Most notably he was named an All-Star for three consecutive years (1991, 1992, 1993), and was named NCAA tournament's most outstanding player (MOP) when he captained Maine to a record of 42–1–2 and the 1993 national championship. His three third-period goals lifted the Black Bears to a 5–4 comeback win over Lake Superior State in the title game. Montgomery finished his career at Maine as the school's all-time leading scorer with 301 points on 103 goals and 198 assists. His number 19 was retired by Maine, one of three players who have that honour, the others being Hobey Baker Award winners Scott Pellerin (no. 8) and Paul Kariya (no. 9).

Following college, Montgomery was signed by the St. Louis Blues. For the 1993–94 season he skated in 67 contests and scored 20 points, both NHL career highs. Following the season the highly touted Montgomery was traded to the Montreal Canadiens for Guy Carbonneau. For the 1994–95 season, however, things did not work out, and after just five games Montgomery was released by the Canadiens. Later in the year he was signed by the Philadelphia Flyers and skated in eight regular season contests and seven playoff contests with the Flyers. Montgomery is credited with nicknaming the dominant line of John LeClair, Eric Lindros, and Mikael Renberg the "Legion of Doom". The 1995–96 season saw Montgomery play only five games with the Flyers but he had a career year with the Flyers minor league affiliate, the Hershey Bears of the American Hockey League (AHL). He scored 105 points in 78 games and was named to the AHL Second All-Star Team.

It would be another four years before Montgomery would return to the NHL. He played in the Deutsche Eishockey Liga (DEL) in Germany during the 1996–97 season, followed by two full years with the Philadelphia Phantoms of the AHL. During the 1999–2000 season Montgomery played part of the year with the Phantoms and spent the majority of the year with the Manitoba Moose of the International Hockey League (IHL).

In 2000, Montgomery was signed by the San Jose Sharks, and played the majority of the 2000–01 season with the Kentucky Thoroughblades of the IHL, also making 28 appearances for the Sharks. The following year he was signed by the Dallas Stars and played nine games with the team over two years, spending most of his time with the Utah Grizzlies of the AHL. Montgomery then played one season with Salavat Yulaev Ufa of the Russian Superleague (RSL) and then played with the Missouri River Otters of the United Hockey League (UHL) before retiring in 2005.

== Career statistics ==
			Regular season					Playoffs
Season	Team	League	GP	G	A	Pts	PIM	GP	G	A	Pts	PIM
1988–89	Pembroke Lumber Kings	CCHL	50	53	101	154	112	—	—	—	—	—
1989–90	University of Maine	HE	45	26	34	60	35	—	—	—	—	—
1990–91	University of Maine	HE	43	24	57	81	44	—	—	—	—	—
1991–92	University of Maine	HE	37	21	44	65	46	—	—	—	—	—
1992–93	University of Maine	HE	45	32	63	95	40	—	—	—	—	—
1993–94	St. Louis Blues	NHL	67	6	14	20	44	—	—	—	—	—
1993–94	Peoria Rivermen	IHL	12	7	8	15	10	—	—	—	—	—
1994–95	Montreal Canadiens	NHL	5	0	0	0	2	—	—	—	—	—
1994–95	Philadelphia Flyers	NHL	8	1	1	2	6	7	1	0	1	2
1994–95	Hershey Bears	AHL	16	8	6	14	14	6	3	2	5	25
1995–96	Philadelphia Flyers	NHL	5	1	2	3	9	1	0	0	0	0
1995–96	Hershey Bears	AHL	78	34	71	105	95	4	3	2	5	6
1996–97	Kölner Haie	DEL	50	12	35	47	11	4	0	1	1	6
1997–98	Philadelphia Phantoms	AHL	68	19	43	62	75	20	13	16	29	55
1998–99	Philadelphia Phantoms	AHL	78	29	58	87	89	16	4	11	15	20
1999–2000	Philadelphia Phantoms	AHL	13	3	9	12	22	—	—	—	—	—
1999–2000	Manitoba Moose	IHL	67	18	28	46	111	—	—	—	—	—
2000–01	San Jose Sharks	NHL	28	1	6	7	19	—	—	—	—	—
2000–01	Kentucky Thoroughblades	IHL	55	22	52	74	44	3	1	2	3	5
2001–02	Dallas Stars	NHL	8	0	2	2	0	—	—	—	—	—
2001–02	Utah Grizzlies	AHL	71	28	43	71	90	5	0	1	1	23
2002–03	Dallas Stars	NHL	1	0	0	0	0	—	—	—	—	—
2002–03	Utah Grizzlies	AHL	72	22	46	68	109	2	0	0	0	2
2003–04	Salavat Yulaev Ufa	RSL	20	0	7	7	10	—	—	—	—	—
2004–05	Missouri River Otters	UHL	42	20	27	47	64	3	0	0	0	0
NHL totals			122	9	25	34	80	8	1	0	1	2
AHL totals			451	165	328	493	538	56	24	34	58	136

== Coaching career ==
Montgomery was an assistant coach for Notre Dame for the 2005–06 season. In 2006, Montgomery began a four-year stint as assistant coach at Rensselaer Polytechnic Institute. On April 12, 2010, he was named head coach of the United States Hockey League (USHL) expansion franchise Dubuque Fighting Saints. In the team's first year, Montgomery guided the Fighting Saints to a 37–14–9 record and the 2010–11 USHL championship with a three games to one victory over the Green Bay Gamblers. He went on to win the Clark Cup again during the 2012–13 season. In 2013, Montgomery was signed by University of Denver as head coach of their Pioneers men's ice hockey team and led them to a berth in the NCAA tournament. He led the Pioneers to the 2016 Frozen Four. In 2017, his fourth year as the head coach of the Pioneers, he led them to the national championship after establishing them as the first-seeded team in the country for the majority of the season. In 2016–17 season he was named the Spencer Penrose national coach of the year.

=== Dallas Stars (2018–2019) ===
On May 4, 2018, Montgomery was named as the head coach of the Dallas Stars of the National Hockey League (NHL). He led the Stars to their first playoff appearance in three years.

On December 10, 2019, the Stars fired Montgomery for "unprofessional conduct inconsistent with the core values and beliefs of the Dallas Stars and the National Hockey League." At a press conference, general manager Jim Nill said the situation had come to light the previous weekend, and involved "a material act of unprofessionalism" egregious enough to demand Montgomery's immediate firing. He did not offer specifics "out of respect for everyone involved," only saying that it did not involve abuse of players or criminal conduct. Rick Bowness, who joined the team a month after Montgomery's hiring in May 2018, was named interim coach, while Derek Laxdal (who was the head coach of the Texas Stars at the time) would be promoted to the assistant coaching position that was vacated by Bowness.

According to Sportsnet's Elliotte Friedman, Montgomery was fired for "a personal behaviour issue," and the Stars were not divulging details to protect the privacy of both the whistleblower and Montgomery's family. Montgomery told WFAA in Dallas that "there will be a time" when he speaks about the circumstances that led to his firing.

On January 3, 2020, Montgomery announced that he had checked himself into rehab to deal with alcohol abuse. He said that the Stars had made "an appropriate call" in firing him, and that his dismissal made him realize he was living a "damaging lifestyle." On January 7, the Fort Worth Star-Telegram reported that Montgomery was fired in part due to concerns about his drinking. Nill had reportedly confronted Montgomery on numerous occasions about drinking in public. The Stars had been aware of Montgomery's history with alcohol; he had been arrested for DUI in 2008 during his time at RPI.

=== St. Louis Blues (2020–2022) ===
On September 16, 2020, the St. Louis Blues signed Montgomery to a two-year contract, serving as assistant coach under Craig Berube.

=== Boston Bruins (2022–2024) ===
On June 30, 2022, the Boston Bruins named Montgomery head coach, replacing Bruce Cassidy. Montgomery's "positive coaching" was widely assessed as a significant shift from his predecessor's approach, and led to major improvements in the team for the 2022–23 season. The Bruins finished with a 65–12–5 record and 135 points, breaking both the previous record for wins (62), jointly held by the 2018–19 Tampa Bay Lightning and the 1995–96 Detroit Red Wings, and for points (132), previously set by the 1976–77 Montreal Canadiens. The team received the Presidents' Trophy, while Montgomery won the Jack Adams Award as NHL coach of the year.

The Bruins entered the 2023 Stanley Cup playoffs as the favourites for the championship. However, they were ousted in the first round by the Florida Panthers, squandering a 3–1 series lead in the process. The series was dubbed "one of the worst choke jobs in Boston sports history." Much recrimination ensued about Montgomery's coaching decisions, in particular the choice to depart from the team's regular season goalie rotation between Linus Ullmark and Jeremy Swayman to playing Ullmark exclusively despite him dealing with an injury. Ullmark defended Montgomery, saying "something that everybody does when things aren't going the way they want to is they're trying to find a scapegoat."

On November 19, 2024, Montgomery was relieved of his head coaching duties following a 8–9–3 start to the 2024–25 season.

=== Return to St. Louis (2024–present) ===
On November 24, 2024, five days after his departure from Boston, Montgomery signed a five-year contract to return to the Blues as head coach, succeeding Drew Bannister.

== Head coaching record ==
=== NHL ===
Team	Year	Regular season						Postseason			
Team	Year	G	W	L	OTL	Pts	Finish	W	L	Win%	Result
DAL	2018–19	82	43	32	7	93	4th in Central	7	6	.538	Lost in second round (STL)
DAL	2019–20	32	17	11	3	(37)	(fired)	—	—	—	—
DAL total		114	60	43	10			7	6	.538	1 playoff appearance
BOS	2022–23	82	65	12	5	135	1st in Atlantic	3	4	.429	Lost in first round (FLA)
BOS	2023–24	82	47	20	15	109	2nd in Atlantic	6	7	.462	Lost in second round (FLA)
BOS	2024–25	20	8	9	3	(19)	(fired)	—	—	—	—
BOS total		184	120	41	23			9	11	.450	2 playoff appearances
STL	2024–25	60	35	18	7	(77)	5th in Central	3	4	.429	Lost in first round (WPG)
STL	2025–26	82	37	33	12	86	5th in Central	—	—	—	Missed playoffs
STL total		142	72	51	19			3	4	.429	1 playoff appearance
Total		439	252	135	52			19	21	.475	4 playoff appearances

=== NCAA ===
Record table
Season	Team	Overall	Conference	Standing	Postseason
Denver Pioneers (NCHC) (2013–2018)
2013–14	Denver	20–16–6	14–12–3	6th	NCAA Northeast Regional Semifinals
2014–15	Denver	24–14–2	16–11–1	4th	NCAA East Regional Final
2015–16	Denver	25–10–6	19–6–3	3rd	NCAA Frozen Four
2016–17	Denver	33–7–4	18–3–3	1st	NCAA National Champion
2017–18	Denver	23–10–8	12–6–6	2nd	NCAA Midwest Regional Final
Denver:		125–57–26	79–38–16		
Total:		125–57–26			
National champion Postseason invitational champion Conference regular season champion Conference regular season and conference tournament champion Division regular season champion Division regular season and conference tournament champion Conference tournament champion

=== USHL ===
Team	Year	Regular season						Postseason			
Team	Year	G	W	L	OTL	Pts	Finish	W	L	Win%	Result
DBQ	2010–11	60	37	14	9	83	1st in Western Conference	9	2	.818	Won Clark Cup
DBQ	2011–12	60	36	20	4	76	3rd in Eastern Conference	2	3	.400	Lost in Conference Semifinals
DBQ	2012–13	64	45	11	8	98	1st in Eastern Conference	9	2	.818	Won Clark Cup
Total		184	118	45	21	257		20	7	74	

== Awards and honours ==
=== As player ===
- All-Hockey East Rookie Team – 1989–90
- All-Hockey East Second Team – 1990–91, 1991–92
- AHCA East Second Team All-American – 1990–91, 1992–93
- Hockey East All-Tournament team – 1992, 1993
- All-Hockey East First Team – 1992–93
- All-NCAA All-Tournament team – 1993
- NCAA national champion — 1993
- NCAA Tournament MVP – 1993
- AHL Second All-Star Team – 1996
- University of Maine Sports Hall of Fame — 1998

=== As coach ===
College

- NCHC tournament champion — 2014, 2018
- NCHC regular season champion — 2017
- NCAA national champion — 2017
- Spencer Penrose Award — 2017

NHL

- NHL All-Star Game coach – 2023, 2024
- Most wins in an NHL season (65) – 2023
- Jack Adams Award – 2023

Sporting positions
Preceded by Ken Hitchcock	Head coach of the Dallas Stars; 2018–2019	Succeeded by Rick Bowness
Preceded by Bruce Cassidy	Head coach of the Boston Bruins; 2022–2024	Succeeded by Joe Sacco (interim)
Preceded by Drew Bannister	Head coach of the St. Louis Blues; 2024–present	Incumbent
Awards and achievements
Preceded by Darryl Sutter	Jack Adams Award; 2023	Succeeded by Rick Tocchet
Preceded by Scott Pellerin	William Flynn Tournament Most Valuable Player; 1993	Succeeded by Dwayne Roloson
Preceded by Paul Constantin	NCAA Tournament Most Outstanding Player; 1993	Succeeded by Sean Tallaire
Preceded by Rand Pecknold	Spencer Penrose Award; 2016–17	Succeeded by Jeff Jackson
