= Eric Fenton =

American ice hockey player (born 1969)

- Born: July 17, 1969 (age 57) Troy, New York, U.S.
- Height: 6 ft 2 in (188 cm)
- Weight: 190 lb (86 kg; 13 st 8 lb)
- Position: Right wing
- Shot: Right
- Played for: AHL; Portland Pirates; IHL; Peoria Rivermen; Milwaukee Admirals; ECHL; Hampton Roads Admirals; Charlotte Checkers; BISL; Newcastle Jesters
- NHL draft: 202nd overall, 1988; New York Rangers
- Playing career: 1993–2001

Eric Fenton (born July 17, 1969) is an American former professional ice hockey player. He was selected by the New York Rangers in the 10th round (202nd overall) of the 1988 NHL entry draft.

On August 4, 1993 Fenton signed a professional contract with the Portland Pirates, becoming the first member of the fledgling American Hockey league team.

== Career statistics ==
			Regular season					Playoffs
Season	Team	League	GP	G	A	Pts	PIM	GP	G	A	Pts	PIM
1989–90	University of Maine	NCAA	7	2	2	4	2	—	—	—	—	—
1990–91	University of Maine	NCAA	10	0	1	1	4	—	—	—	—	—
1991–92	University of Maine	NCAA	22	7	8	15	18	—	—	—	—	—
1992–93	University of Maine	NCAA	31	21	15	36	76	—	—	—	—	—
1993–94	Hampton Roads Admirals	ECHL	24	12	16	28	39	—	—	—	—	—
1993–94	Portland Pirates	AHL	25	2	5	7	104	—	—	—	—	—
1994–95	Charlotte Checkers	ECHL	58	11	26	37	269	2	0	0	0	4
1994–95	Peoria Rivermen	IHL	8	1	1	2	20	2	0	0	0	8
1995–96	Charlotte Checkers	ECHL	4	2	1	3	36	4	1	0	1	33
1995–96	Peoria Rivermen	IHL	33	2	7	9	102	12	3	1	4	38
1996–97	Charlotte Checkers	ECHL	29	15	9	24	163	—	—	—	—	—
1996–97	Milwaukee Admirals	IHL	43	3	5	8	169	3	1	0	1	6
1997–98	Milwaukee Admirals	IHL	78	21	19	40	331	10	0	3	3	41
1998–99	Milwaukee Admirals	IHL	5	1	2	3	24	—	—	—	—	—
1999–00	Milwaukee Admirals	IHL	72	7	12	19	256	—	—	—	—	—
2000–01	Newcastle Jesters	BISL	46	13	16	29	89	—	—	—	—	—
ECHL totals			115	40	52	92	507	6	1	0	1	37
IHL totals			239	35	46	81	902	27	4	4	8	93
