= 1994–95 Boston University Terriers men's ice hockey season =

National champion Mariucci Classic, champion Beanpot, champion Hockey East, co-champion Hockey East tournament, champion NCAA tournament, champion
- Conference: T–1st Hockey East
- Home ice: Walter Brown Arena

Record
- Overall: 31–6–3
- Conference: 16–5–3
- Home: 13–1–1
- Road: 9–3–2
- Neutral: 9–2

Coaches and captains
- Head coach: Jack Parker
- Assistant coaches: Blaise MacDonald; Mike Eruzione; Bill Berglund
- Captain: Jacques Joubert
- Alternate captain(s): Rich Brennan; Derek Herlofsky

The 1994–95 Boston University Terriers men's ice hockey team represented Boston University in college ice hockey. In its 22nd year under head coach Jack Parker, the team compiled a 31–6–3 record and reached the NCAA tournament for the sixth consecutive season and twenty-first all-time. The Terriers defeated Maine 6–2 in the championship game at the Providence Civic Center in Providence, Rhode Island, to win their fourth national championship.

== Season ==
Coming off of the worst championship loss in over 30 years, Jack Parker was looking for a way to help his team recover from a nightmarish end. To make matters worse, goaltender J. P. McKersie, an AHCA Second Team All-American, was hit by a car while biking, and was in a coma for six days. While McKersie would recover and eventually continue his playing career, he would sit out the entire 1994–95 season. This left a rather large void in net, but because Parker rotated his goaltenders, senior alternate captain Derek Herlofsky was well positioned to shoulder his share of the burden. The bulk of McKersie's minutes would eventually go to Chicago draft pick Tom Noble, who beat out Shawn Ferullo for the second spot in goal.

The forward and defensive corps were in a much more stable position, as BU returned the majority of its principal players from a year before. The Terriers also added a couple of top prospects to this mix, including Chris Drury, who was already nationally famous for having led Trumbull, Connecticut, to the 1989 Little League World Series championship.

=== Slow start ===
Early on, the Terriers had trouble finding consistency in their game, starting 3–1–2 through the first three weeks of the season but having allowed seven goals against in two different games. After a weekend against the worst team in Hockey East, Massachusetts, albeit only in their second season since returning to the ice, BU was able to settle down and get themselves ready for their first tournament of the season.

=== Tournament play ===
At the end of November, BU headed to California for the Great Western Freeze–Out, held at the home arena of the Los Angeles Kings. The Terriers easily downed Princeton in the semifinal, then pushed national powerhouse Maine into overtime, but the Black Bears prevailed. While the loss did not harm BU too much since it was a non-conference game, they faced Maine in a pair of road games the following weekend. While the Terriers only captured 3 points out of 10 in the series, both games were played very close and demonstrated that the two teams were evenly matched.

The near miss against Maine appeared to light a fire under the Terriers, who dominated their next two games (winning by a combined score of 21–3) before taking several weeks off for their winter break. Tthe team returned to the ice at the end of December, in Minneapolis for the Mariucci Classic. Similar to their first tournament, BU won the semifinal comfortably and headed into overtime in the title game. This time they won via a goal by Ken Rausch.

=== Catching Maine ===
At the beginning of 1995, BU was 16 points behind Maine. However, because Hockey East had altered its point system beginning with 1994–95 (five points for a win, two points for a tie and an additional point for a shootout win after overtime), they were only about three games behind the Black Bears with three games in hand. This meant that despite going 0–1–2 against Maine in their head-to-head matchups, the Terriers could still keep even with the conference leaders.

The Terriers played well in January, going 6–2, with all games coming against conference opponents. The consistent play allowed BU to close the gap with Maine with one game in hand. That was put on the back burner, however, as BU played in the Beanpot at the beginning of February. The Terriers captured their 18th title after dropping a weak Boston College team in the championship, but the time off had allowed Maine to build a 15-point lead in the Hockey East standings.

Ill-equipped to afford a mistake, the Terriers fell to Providence, losing 1–8 in their worst performance of the season. BU recovered to win the rematch, but that left Maine with a 10-point lead in the standings, and both teams had three games to play. Fortunately for the Terriers, their remaining games came against two of the worst teams in Hockey East, while the Black Bears faced much stiffer competition. BU swept their final three games, while Maine lost twice, and the two teams ended in a tie for first in the conference standings.

=== Hockey East tournament ===
Because Maine had the tie-breaker due to the head-to-head meetings, BU received the 2nd seed and played Merrimack in the quarterfinals. While the game was close, BU won the 1-goal game and advanced to the semifinal at the nearby Boston Garden. The Terriers beat Massachusetts–Lowell to reach the championship, where they were surprised to find 6th-seeded Providence as their opponent. The Friars proved up to the task, and played the Terriers hard, but BU held firm and won the game 3–2 to win their second consecutive conference tournament.

=== NCAA tournament ===
The championship allowed BU to earn the top eastern seed and a bye into the regional semifinals. After a week off, the Terriers faced defending national champion Lake Superior State and exacted their revenge with a 6–2 victory. BU advanced to the Frozen Four and faced Minnesota in a rematch of the 1994 national semifinal. The score may have been different, but the result was the same, as Boston University defeated the Golden Gophers 7–3 to return to the national championship game.

The Terriers faced Maine on April Fool's Day. Though the Black Bears had yet to lose to BU that year, they were coming off of a three-overtime epic game against Michigan (then the longest game in NCAA tournament history). Despite this, Maine was able to control the balance of play early, outshooting the Terriers early. However, on a faceoff in the Black Bear end on the Power Play, Steve Thornton tapped the puck through Brad Purdie's skates and fired home the first goal of the game. After that, Maine netminder Blair Allison had to face a barrage by the BU offense that saw him face 21 shots over the next 25 minutes (compared to Maine's 6). The Terriers scored twice more to build a three-goal lead midway through the game, but the Black Bears were able to get on the scoresheet before the end of the second. Maine closed the lead to one just 31 seconds into the final frame, but BU continued to apply pressure to Allison, and scored twice more before capping off the game with a third power play goal to win their fourth national championship.

=== Awards and honors ===
The two-goal game from Chris O'Sullivan earned him the title of Tournament MOP. He was joined on the All-Tournament team by Kaj Linna and Shawn Bates. Mike Grier was named to the AHCA All-American East First Team, while Linna and O'Sullivan made the second team. All three players were named to the All-Hockey East Second Team. Chris Kelleher made the Hockey East All-Rookie Team. Steve Thornton received the Len Ceglarski Award for sportsmanship.

== Standings ==
1994–95 Hockey East standings
	Conference								Overall					
	GP	W	L	T	SW	PTS	GF	GA	GP	W	L	T	GF	GA
Maine†	24	15	3	6	1	88	104	63	44	32	6	6	196	118
Boston University†*	24	16	5	3	2	88	131	82	40	31	6	3	224	117
New Hampshire	24	14	6	4	0	78	113	85	36	22	10	4	161	123
Northeastern	24	11	8	5	5	70	98	89	35	16	14	5	143	137
Massachusetts–Lowell	24	11	12	1	1	58	105	116	41	17	19	4	165	175
Providence	24	7	11	6	3	50	102	103	37	14	17	6	158	159
Merrimack	24	7	12	5	3	48	74	91	37	14	18	5	125	137
Boston College	24	8	14	2	1	45	86	119	35	11	22	2	129	169
Massachusetts	24	3	21	0	0	15	64	129	36	6	28	2	92	173
Championship: Boston University † indicates conference regular season champion * indicates conference tournament champion

== Schedule ==
Date	Opponent^{#}	Rank^{#}	Site	Result	Record
Exhibition
October 15	vs. New Brunswick*		Walter Brown Arena • Boston, Massachusetts (Exhibition)	W 7–6	
Regular season
October 28	at Rensselaer*		Houston Field House • Troy, New York	W 5–1	1–0
October 30	vs. Maine		Walter Brown Arena • Boston, Massachusetts	T 3–3 ^{OT}	1–0–1 (0–0–1)
November 4	vs. Massachusetts–Lowell		Walter Brown Arena • Boston, Massachusetts	W 9–7	2–0–1 (1–0–1)
November 5	at Massachusetts–Lowell		Tully Forum • Billerica, Massachusetts	T 7–7 ^{OT}	2–0–2 (1–0–2)
November 11	at Northeastern		Matthews Arena • Boston, Massachusetts	L 1–3	2–1–2 (1–1–2)
November 12	vs. Northeastern		Walter Brown Arena • Boston, Massachusetts	W 4–2	3–1–2 (2–1–2)
November 18	vs. Massachusetts		Walter Brown Arena • Boston, Massachusetts	W 7–0	4–1–2 (3–1–2)
November 19	at Massachusetts		Mullins Center • Amherst, Massachusetts	W 7–4	5–1–2 (4–1–2)
November 22	at Harvard*		Bright-Landry Hockey Center • Boston, Massachusetts	W 6–1	6–1–2 (4–1–2)
Great Western Freeze–Out
November 25	vs. Princeton*		The Forum • Inglewood, California (Great Western Semifinal)	W 6–2	7–1–2 (4–1–2)
November 27	vs. Maine*		The Forum • Inglewood, California (Great Western championship)	L 5–6 ^{OT}	7–2–2 (4–1–2)
December 2	at Maine		Alfond Arena • Orono, Maine	L 5–6	7–3–2 (4–2–2)
December 3	at Maine		Alfond Arena • Orono, Maine	T 5–5 ^{OT}	7–3–3 (4–2–3)
December 7	vs. Vermont*		Walter Brown Arena • Boston, Massachusetts	W 11–1	8–3–3 (4–2–3)
December 10	vs. Dartmouth*		Walter Brown Arena • Boston, Massachusetts	W 10–2	9–3–3 (4–2–3)
Mariucci Classic
December 30	vs. Western Michigan*		Mariucci Arena • Minneapolis, Minnesota (Mariucci Semifinal)	W 5–2	10–3–3 (4–2–3)
December 31	at Minnesota*		Mariucci Arena • Minneapolis, Minnesota (Mariucci championship)	W 4–3 ^{OT}	11–3–3 (4–2–3)
January 6	vs. New Hampshire		Walter Brown Arena • Boston, Massachusetts	W 5–1	12–3–3 (5–2–3)
January 10	at Providence		Schneider Arena • Providence, Rhode Island	W 9–2	13–3–3 (6–2–3)
January 13	vs. Merrimack		Walter Brown Arena • Boston, Massachusetts	L 2–3	13–4–3 (6–3–3)
January 14	vs. Northeastern		Walter Brown Arena • Boston, Massachusetts	W 6–2	14–4–3 (7–3–3)
January 20	at Boston College		Conte Forum • Chestnut Hill, Massachusetts	W 7–4	15–4–3 (8–3–3)
January 21	vs. Boston College		Walter Brown Arena • Boston, Massachusetts	W 5–1	16–4–3 (9–3–3)
January 26	vs. New Hampshire		Cumberland Civic Center • Portland, Maine	L 2–4	16–5–3 (9–4–3)
January 28	vs. New Hampshire		Walter Brown Arena • Boston, Massachusetts	W 7–3	17–5–3 (10–4–3)
February 3	at Massachusetts		Mullins Center • Amherst, Massachusetts	W 5–1	18–5–3 (11–4–3)
Beanpot
February 6	vs. Northeastern		Boston Garden • Boston, Massachusetts (Beanpot Semifinal)	W 6–2	19–5–3 (11–4–3)
February 10	at Massachusetts–Lowell		Tully Forum • Billerica, Massachusetts	W 9–6	20–5–3 (12–4–3)
February 13	vs. Boston College		Boston Garden • Boston, Massachusetts (Beanpot championship)	W 5–1	21–5–3 (12–4–3)
February 17	at Providence		Schneider Arena • Providence, Rhode Island	L 1–8	21–6–3 (12–5–3)
February 18	vs. Providence		Walter Brown Arena • Boston, Massachusetts	W 6–3	22–6–3 (13–5–3)
February 24	at Merrimack		J. Thom Lawler Rink • North Andover, Massachusetts	W 4–1	23–6–3 (14–5–3)
February 25	vs. Merrimack		Walter Brown Arena • Boston, Massachusetts	W 5–3	24–6–3 (15–5–3)
March 4	vs. Boston College		Walter Brown Arena • Boston, Massachusetts	W 10–3	25–6–3 (16–5–3)
Hockey East tournament
March 12	vs. Merrimack*		Walter Brown Arena • Boston, Massachusetts (Hockey East Quarterfinal)	W 4–3	26–6–3 (16–5–3)
March 17	vs. Massachusetts–Lowell*		Boston Garden • Boston, Massachusetts (Hockey East Semifinal)	W 4–2	27–6–3 (16–5–3)
March 18	vs. Providence*		Boston Garden • Boston, Massachusetts (Hockey East championship)	W 3–2	28–6–3 (16–5–3)
NCAA tournament
March 25	vs. Lake Superior State*		DCU Center • Worcester, Massachusetts (Regional semifinal)	W 6–2	29–6–3 (16–5–3)
March 30	vs. Minnesota*		Providence Civic Center • Providence, Rhode Island (National semifinal)	W 7–3	30–6–3 (16–5–3)
April 1	vs. Maine*		Providence Civic Center • Providence, Rhode Island (National championship)	W 6–2	31–6–3 (16–5–3)
*Non-conference game. ^{#}Rankings from USCHO.com Poll. Source:

== Roster ==
No.	Nat.	Player	Class	Pos	Height	Weight	DoB	Hometown	Previous team	NHL rights
1		Shawn Ferullo	Sophomore	G	5' 8" (1.73 m)	158 lb (72 kg)	1975-04-03	Lynnfield, Massachusetts		—
2		Kaj Linna	Senior	D	6' 2" (1.88 m)	210 lb (95 kg)	1971-01-24	Helsinki, Finland	Karhu-Kissat (I-Divisioona)	—
3		Chris O'Sullivan	Sophomore	D/F	6' 3" (1.91 m)	199 lb (90 kg)	1974-05-15	Dorchester, Massachusetts	Catholic Memorial School (USHS–MA)	CGY, 30 overall 1992
4		Chris Kelleher	Freshman	D	6' 1" (1.85 m)	214 lb (97 kg)	1975-05-23	Belmont, Massachusetts	St. Sebastian's School (USHS–Prep)	PIT, 130 overall 1993
5		Doug Wood	Junior	D	6' 1" (1.85 m)	200 lb (91 kg)	1974-01-07	Sudbury, Massachusetts		—
7		Rich Brennan (A)	Senior	D	6' 2" (1.88 m)	200 lb (91 kg)	1972-11-26	Guilderland, New York	Tabor Academy (USHS–Prep)	QUE, 46 overall 1991
8		Bill Pierce	Sophomore	W	6' 1" (1.85 m)	195 lb (88 kg)	1974-10-06	Burlington, Massachusetts		QUE, 75 overall 1993
9		Shawn Bates	Sophomore	C	6' 0" (1.83 m)	183 lb (83 kg)	1975-04-03	Medford, Massachusetts	Medford High (USHS–MA)	BOS, 103 overall 1993
10		Peter Donatelli	Freshman	F	5' 10" (1.78 m)	180 lb (82 kg)	1975-11-05	North Providence, Rhode Island	North Iowa Huskies (USHL)	—
11		Bob Lachance	Junior	W	5' 11" (1.8 m)	183 lb (83 kg)	1974-02-01	Bristol, Connecticut	US National Junior Team (WJC)	STL, 134 overall 1992
12		Mike Grier	Sophomore	W	6' 0" (1.83 m)	242 lb (110 kg)	1975-01-05	Holliston, Massachusetts	St. Sebastian's School (USHS–Prep)	STL, 219 overall 1993
14		John Hynes	Freshman	W	5' 9" (1.75 m)	168 lb (76 kg)	1975-02-10	Warwick, Rhode Island		—
15		Mike Sylvia	Freshman	F	5' 10" (1.78 m)	170 lb (77 kg)	1976-02-05	Newton, Massachusetts		—
16		Ken Rausch	Senior	W	6' 0" (1.83 m)	189 lb (86 kg)	1973-03-26	Danbury, Connecticut		NJD, 32 overall 1993
17		Jay Pandolfo	Junior	W	6' 0" (1.83 m)	197 lb (89 kg)	1974-12-27	Burlington, Massachusetts	Burlington High (USHS–MA)	—
18		Chris Drury	Freshman	F	5' 10" (1.78 m)	184 lb (83 kg)	1976-08-20	Fairfield, Connecticut	Fairfield Prep (USHS–CT)	QUE, 72 overall 1994
19		Steve Thornton	Senior	C	5' 11" (1.8 m)	179 lb (81 kg)	1973-03-08	Gloucester, Ontario	Gloucester Rangers (CJHL)	—
20		Jeff Kealty	Freshman	D	6' 4" (1.93 m)	190 lb (86 kg)	1976-04-09	Framingham, Massachusetts	Catholic Memorial School (USHS–MA)	QUE, 22 overall 1994
21		Mike Prendergast	Senior	W	5' 9" (1.75 m)	182 lb (83 kg)	1972-10-22	South Boston, Massachusetts	US National Junior Team (WJC)	—
22		Matt Wright	Sophomore	W	6' 1" (1.85 m)	180 lb (82 kg)	1973-04-27	Belmont, Massachusetts	Phillips Academy Andover (USHS–Prep)	—
24		Jacques Joubert (C)	Senior	C	6' 2" (1.88 m)	201 lb (91 kg)	1971-03-23	South Bend, Indiana	North Iowa Huskies (USHL)	—
26		Jon Coleman	Sophomore	D	6' 0" (1.83 m)	192 lb (87 kg)	1975-03-09	Canton, Massachusetts	US National Junior Team (WJC)	DET, 48 overall 1993
27		Shane Johnson	Sophomore	D	5' 10" (1.78 m)	185 lb (84 kg)	1974-01-01	Brandon, Manitoba	Kelowna Spartans (BCJHL)	—
29		J. P. McKersie	Senior	G	6' 1" (1.85 m)	206 lb (93 kg)	1972-01-23	Madison, Wisconsin	Dubuque Fighting Saints (USHL)	MNS, 239 overall 1990
30		Tom Noble	Freshman	G	5' 10" (1.78 m)	153 lb (69 kg)	1975-03-21	Hanover, Massachusetts		CHI, 284 overall 1993
35		Derek Herlofsky (A)	Senior	G	5' 10" (1.78 m)	173 lb (78 kg)	1971-10-01	Minneapolis, Minnesota	St. Paul Vulcans (USHL)	MNS, 184 overall 1991

== Scoring statistics ==
Name	Position	Games	Goals	Assists	Points	PIM
Chris O'Sullivan	D/F	40	23	33	56	48
Mike Grier	W	37	29	26	55	85
Jacques Joubert	C	40	29	23	52	41
Steve Thornton	C	39	17	24	41	14
Bob Lachance	W	37	12	29	41	14
Mike Prendergast	F	38	17	22	39	30
Shawn Bates	C	38	18	12	30	48
Rich Brennan	D	31	5	23	28	56
Jon Coleman	D	40	5	23	28	42
Chris Drury	W	39	12	15	27	38
Kaj Linna	D	36	7	20	27	26
Ken Rausch	W	37	12	12	24	6
Jay Pandolfo	W	20	7	13	20	6
Chris Kelleher	D	35	3	17	20	62
Mike Sylvia	W	36	10	9	19	25
Bill Pierce	F	33	5	13	18	29
Doug Wood	D	39	6	11	17	87
Matt Wright	W	35	7	9	16	27
Shane Johnson	D	33	0	6	6	50
Jeff Kealty	D	25	0	5	5	29
Derek Herlofsky	G	24	0	3	3	2
Tom Noble	G	18	0	2	2	0
Peter Donatelli	F	2	0	0	0	0
Shawn Ferullo	G	5	0	0	0	0
John Hynes	W	7	0	0	0	6
Total						

== Goaltending statistics ==
Name	Games	Minutes	Wins	Losses	Ties	Goals against	Saves	Shut outs	SV %	GAA
Derek Herlofsky	24		16	3	3	60				
Tom Noble	18	1007	15	3	0	46				2.74
Shawn Ferullo	5		0	0	0					
Total	40		31	6	3	117		1		

== 1995 championship game ==
=== (E1) Boston University vs. (E2) Maine ===
April 1	Boston University	6 – 2	Maine	Providence Civic Center

Scoring summary
Period	Team	Goal	Assist(s)	Time	Score
1st	BU	Steve Thornton – PP	unassisted	14:57	1–0 BU
2nd	BU	Chris O'Sullivan	Thornton and Grier	27:27	2–0 BU
2nd	BU	Jacques Joubert – PP GW	Linna and Prendergast	29:15	3–0 BU
2nd	Maine	Tim Lovell	Frenette and Thompson	34:51	3–1 BU
3rd	Maine	Trevor Roenick	Rodrigue and Tory	40:31	3–2 BU
3rd	BU	Mike Sylvia	Bates and Pandolfo	45:23	4–2 BU
3rd	BU	Chris O'Sullivan – PP	Brennan and Grier	48:30	5–2 BU
3rd	BU	Bob Lachance – SH	Thornton	58:47	6–2 BU
Penalty summary
Period	Team	Player	Penalty	Time	PIM
1st	BU	Mike Sylvia	High-sticking	2:13	2:00
1st	Maine	Tim Lovell	High-sticking	2:13	2:00
1st	BU	Shawn Bates	Interference	8:32	2:00
1st	BU	Shane Johnson	Interference	11:26	2:00
1st	Maine	Brad Mahoney	Roughing	13:50	2:00
1st	Maine	Jamie Thompson	Cross–checking	16:25	2:00
1st	BU	Chris O'Sullivan	Cross–checking	17:53	2:00
2nd	BU	Chris Drury	Interference	23:19	2:00
2nd	Maine	Dan Shermerhorn	Interference	28:42	2:00
2nd	BU	Shane Johnson	Interference	38:20	2:00
2nd	BU	Kaj Linna	Slashing	39:44	2:00
3rd	Maine	Reg Cardinal	Holding	47:41	2:00
3rd	BU	Kaj Linna	Holding	52:17	2:00
3rd	Maine	Jason Mansoff	Holding	55:26	2:00
3rd	BU	Jacques Joubert	Elbowing	55:26	2:00
3rd	BU	Bench	Too many men	56:59	2:00

Shots by period
Team	1	2	3	T
Maine	9	5	9	23
Boston University	11	14	14	39

Goaltenders
Team	Name	Saves	Goals against	Time on ice
Maine	Blair Allison	33	5	58:28
BU	Tom Noble	21	2	60:00

== Players drafted into the NHL ==
=== 1995 NHL entry draft ===
= Did not play in the NHL

Round	Pick	Player	NHL team
8	183	Kaj Linna	Ottawa Senators
