= 1995 NCAA Division I men's ice hockey tournament =

- Teams: 12
- Finals site: Providence Civic Center, Providence, Rhode Island
- Champions: Boston University Terriers (4th title)
- Runner-up: Maine Black Bears (2nd title game)
- Semifinalists: Minnesota Golden Gophers (16th Frozen Four); Michigan Wolverines (16th Frozen Four)
- Winning coach: Jack Parker (2nd title)
- MOP: Chris O'Sullivan (Boston University)
- Attendance: 65,624

The 1995 NCAA Division I men's ice hockey tournament involved 12 schools playing in single-elimination play to determine the national champion of men's NCAA Division I college ice hockey. It began on March 24, 1995, and ended with the championship game on April 1. A total of 11 games were played. The top 2 seeds in each region received a bye into the tournament quarterfinals.

== Qualifying teams ==
The at-large bids and seeding for each team in the tournament were announced after the conference tournaments concluded. The Western Collegiate Hockey Association (WCHA) had four teams receive a berth in the tournament, the Central Collegiate Hockey Association (CCHA) and Hockey East each had three teams receive a berth in the tournament, while the ECAC had two berths.

East Regional – Worcester							West Regional – Madison						
Seed	School	Conference	Record	Berth type	Appearance	Last bid	Seed	School	Conference	Record	Berth type	Appearance	Last bid
1	Boston University	Hockey East	28–6–3	Tournament champion	21st	1994	1	Michigan	CCHA	29–7–1	At-large bid	18th	1994
2	Maine	Hockey East	30–5–6	At-large bid	8th	1993	2	Colorado College	WCHA	30–11–1	At-large bid	9th	1978
3	New Hampshire	Hockey East	22–9–4	At-large bid	7th	1994	3	Minnesota	WCHA	23–13–5	At-large bid	22nd	1994
4	Clarkson	ECAC	23–9–4	At-large bid	14th	1993	4	Wisconsin	WCHA	23–14–4	Tournament champion	16th	1994
5	Lake Superior State	CCHA	22–11–6	Tournament champion	9th	1994	5	Michigan State	CCHA	25–11–3	At-large bid	15th	1994
6	Denver	WCHA	24–14–2	At-large bid	13th	1986	6	Rensselaer	ECAC	19–13–4	Tournament champion	8th	1994

== Game locations ==
- East Regional – Centrum in Worcester, Worcester, Massachusetts
- West Regional – Dane County Coliseum, Madison, Wisconsin
- Frozen Four – Providence Civic Center, Providence, Rhode Island

== Bracket ==
First Round; March 24
E4	Clarkson	4
E5	Lake Superior State	5
W3	Minnesota	3
W6	Rensselaer	0
E3	New Hampshire	2
E6	Denver	9
W4	Wisconsin	5
W5	Michigan State	3

Quarterfinals; March 25
E1	Boston University	6
E5	Lake Superior State	2
W2	Colorado College	2
W3	Minnesota	5
E2	Maine	4
E6	Denver	2
W1	Michigan	4
W4	Wisconsin	3

National Semifinals; March 30
E1	Boston University	7
W3	Minnesota	3
E2	Maine	4***
W1	Michigan	3

National Championship; April 1
E1	Boston University	6
E2	Maine	2

Note: * denotes overtime period(s)

== Results ==
=== East Regional – Worcester, Massachusetts ===
==== First Round ====
March 24, 1995; 4:30 pm	(3) New Hampshire	2–9 (0–4, 1–4, 1–1)	(6) Denver	Centrum in Worcester

Game reference

(out 22:45, in 40:00) Trent Cavicchi
(in 22:45, out 40:00) Mike Heinke
Goalies
Sinuhe Wallinheimo
Referees:
Bob Hearn
Mike Noeth
Linesman:
Joel Dupree

	0 – 1	10:51 – PP – Warren Smith (Ricci, Laaksonen)
	0 – 2	13:39 – Anders Björk (Hollingshead, Klasnick)
	0 – 3	14:38 – GW – Warren Smith (Kenady, Gunther)
	0 – 4	16:43 – Erik Andersson (unassisted)
(unassisted) Todd Hall – 21:58	1 – 4
	1 – 5	22:45 – John McLean (unassisted)
	1 – 6	30:02 – Travis Smith (unassisted)
	1 – 7	36:03 – Jason Elders (Laaksonen)
	1 – 8	38:24 – PP – Petri Gunther (Naylor, Laaksonen)
(Mowers) Eric Flinton – 46:21	2 – 8
	2 – 9	48:43 – Angelo Ricci (Hollingshead, Ortiz)

10 min
Penalties
12 min
31
Shots
27

March 24, 1995; 8:00 pm	(4) Clarkson	4–5 (1–2, 0–2, 3–1)	(5) Lake Superior State	Centrum in Worcester; Attendance: 7,392

Game reference

Dan Murphy
Goalies
John Grahame
Referees:
Greg Shepherd
Mike Schmitt
Linesman:
John Elvy

	0 – 1	03:09 – Jason Trzcinski (Matteucci, G. Tallaire)
	0 – 2	07:37 – PP – Sean Tallaire (Willner, G. Tallaire)
(unassisted) Patrice Robitaille – 17:36	1 – 2
	1 – 3	37:30 – PP – Mike Morin (Felsner, S. Tallaire)
	1 – 4	39:21 – PP – Brad Willner (G. Tallaire)
	1 – 5	40:48 – GW – Brian Felsner (unassisted)
(unassisted) David Seitz – 54:29	2 – 5
(Mueller, Toumainen) Patrice Robitaille – PP – 57:48	3 – 5
(Seitz) Chris de Ruiter – 59:52	4 – 5

33
Shots
33

==== Quarterfinals ====
March 25, 1995; 7:30 pm	(1) Boston University	6–2 (1–0, 1–0, 4–2)	(5) Lake Superior State	Centrum in Worcester; Attendance: 10,881

Game reference

Tom Noble
Goalies
John Grahame

(Wright, Pierce) Chris Drury – 12:20	1 – 0
(Thornton) Kaj Linna – 28:01	2 – 0
(Sylvia) Shawn Bates – GW – 41:33	3 – 0
(Thornton) Rich Brennan – PP – 48:41	4 – 0
	4 – 1	54:23 – Keith Aldridge (unassisted)
	4 – 2	57:29 – SH – Keith Aldridge (Trzcinski)
(O'Sullivan) Kaj Linna – 57:47	5 – 2
(unassisted) Kaj Linna – EN – 59:54	6 – 2

32
Shots
21

March 25, 1995; 4:30 pm	(2) Maine	4–2 (3–0, 1–1, 0–1)	(6) Denver	Centrum in Worcester

Game reference

Blair Allison
Goalies
Sinuhe Wallinheimo
Referees:
Bob Hearn
Mike Noeth
Linesman:
Joel Dupree

(Lovell, Frenette) Jamie Thompson – 08:54	1 – 0
(Thompson) Tim Lovell – 11:48	2 – 0
(Purdie, Rodrigue) Jeff Tory – GW PP – 18:12	3 – 0
	3 – 1	23:54 – Antti Laaksonen (Dairon)
(Conlan, Shermerhorn) Reg Cardinal – 34:44	4 – 1
	4 – 2	57:36 – Petri Gunther (unassisted)

12 min
Penalties
14 min
29
Shots
33

=== West Regional – Madison, Wisconsin ===
==== First Round ====
March 24, 1995; 4:00 pm	(3) Minnesota	3–0 (2–0, 0–0, 1–0)	(6) Rensselaer	Dane County Coliseum; Attendance: 3,131 (est)

Game reference

Jeff Callinan
Goalies
Mike Tamburro
Referees:
John Gravaliese
Jim Fitzgerald
Linesman:
John Jones

(Brink, Larson) Nick Checco – GW – 04:19	1 – 0
(Larson, LaFleur) Nick Checco – 15:41	2 – 0
(Bell, Brink) Bobby Dustin – PP – 49:38	3 – 0

12 min
Penalties
29 min
53
Shots
22

March 24, 1995; 7:30 pm	(4) Wisconsin	5–3 (1–2, 2–1, 2–0)	(5) Michigan State	Dane County Coliseum; Attendance: 7,751

Game reference

Kirk Daubenspeck
Goalies
Mike Buzak
Referees:
Frank Cole
Scott Leavitt
Linesman:
Bill Jones

(Mi. Strobel, Spencer) Mark Strobel – SH – 01:36	1 – 0
	1 – 1	05:09 – PP – Steve Guolla (Slater, Carter)
	1 – 2	06:10 – Chris Slater (Murray)
	1 – 3	24:09 – Anson Carter (Guolla)
(Rafalski, Balkovec) Mike Strobel – PP – 30:25	2 – 3
(Rafalski) Shawn Carter – 35:29	3 – 3
(Ellick) Mike Strobel – GW – 43:05	4 – 3
(Spencer, Rafalski) Chris Tok – 49:27	5 – 3

16 min
Penalties
16 min
38
Shots
28

==== Quarterfinals ====
March 25, 1995; 7:00 pm	(1) Michigan	4–3 (2–1, 1–1, 1–1)	(4) Wisconsin	Dane County Coliseum; Attendance: 7,751

Game reference

Marty Turco
Goalies
Kirk Daubenspeck
Referees:
John Gravaliese
Jim Fitzgerald
Linesman:
John Jones

(Gordon, Halko) Mike Knuble – 07:39	1 – 0
	1 – 1	11:23 – PP – Eric Raygor (Carter, Bianchi)
(Knuble) Robb Gordon – 11:43	2 – 1
	2 – 2	22:54 – SH – Mike Strobel (unassisted)
(Gordon) Brendan Morrison – 29:33	3 – 2
	3 – 3	40:22 – PP – Max Williams (Ma. Strobel, Rafalski)
(Hilton) Mike Knuble – PP GW – 51:51	4 – 3

30 min
Penalties
28 min
40
Shots
27

March 25, 1995; 3:30 pm	(2) Colorado College	2–5 (2–2, 0–2, 0–1)	(3) Minnesota	Dane County Coliseum; Attendance: 7,751

Game reference

Ryan Bach
Goalies
Jeff Callinan
Referees:
Frank Cole
Scott Leavitt
Linesman:
Bill Jones

	0 – 1	03:00 – Dave Larson (Trebil, Bonin)
(Geronazzo) John Steiner – 09:50	1 – 1
(Paxton, Christopherson) Colin Schmidt – 16:13	2 – 1
	2 – 2	17:18 – Scott Bell (Checco)
	2 – 3	24:57 – GW – Nick Checco (Bell)
	2 – 4	39:59 – Dave Larson (Checco, Kraft)
	2 – 5	41:00 – PP – Brian Bonin (Kraft, Crowley)

18 min
Penalties
16 min
31
Shots
32

=== Frozen Four – Providence, Rhode Island ===
==== National Semifinals ====
March 30, 1995; 1:00 pm	(W1) Michigan	3–4 (3OT) (2–1, 0–1, 1–1, 0–0, 0–0, 0–1)	(E2) Maine	Providence Civic Center; Attendance: 12,155

Game reference

Marty Turco
Goalies
Blair Allison
Referees:
Mike Schmitt
Gregg Sheppard
Linesman:
John Elvy

(Luhning, Madden) Kevin Hilton – 01:05	1 – 0
(Hogan, Willis) Matt Herr – 04:16	2 – 0
	2 – 1	18:01 – PP – Jeff Tory (Wansborough, Purdie)
	2 – 2	21:06 – Brad Purdie (Wansborough)
	2 – 3	54:02 – PP – Dan Shermerhorn (Imes, Tory)
(Morrison, Legg) Mike Knuble – 54:51	3 – 3
	3 – 4	100:28 – GW – Dan Shermerhorn (Cardinal)

14 min
Penalties
10 min
50
Shots
56

March 30, 1995; 8:30 pm	(E1) Boston University	7–3 (2–2, 1–1, 4–0)	(W3) Minnesota	Providence Civic Center; Attendance: 12,155

Game reference

Derek Herlofsky
Goalies
Jeff Callinan
Referees:
Mike Noeth
Rob Hearn
Linesman:
Joel Dupree

	0 – 1	12:47 – PP – Mike Crowley (Bonin, Trebil)
(Linna, Coleman) Jacques Joubert – PP – 16:43	1 – 1
	1 – 2	17:41 – Jesse Bertogliat (Dustin)
(Lachance, Joubert) Doug Wood – 19:51	2 – 2
(Drury, Rausch) Matt Wright – 22:31	3 – 2
	3 – 3	32:50 – Dan Hendrickson (Trebil)
(Coleman, Prendergast) Bob Lachance – GW – 40:20	4 – 3
(Drury, Kelleher) Chris O'Sullivan – 46:50	5 – 3
(unassisted) Shawn Bates – 55:07	6 – 3
(unassisted) Mike Sylvia – EN – 57:30	7 – 3

10 min
Penalties
8 min
31
Shots
33

==== National Championship ====
April 1, 1995; 1:30 pm	(E1) Boston University	6–2 (1–0, 2–1, 3–1)	(E2) Maine	Providence Civic Center; Attendance: 11,484

Game reference
Referees: Frank Cole; Scott Leavitt; Linesman: Bill Jones

Scoring summary
Period	Team	Goal	Assist(s)	Time	Score
1st	BU	Steve Thornton – PP	unassisted	14:57	1–0 BU
2nd	BU	Chris O'Sullivan	Thornton and Grier	27:27	2–0 BU
2nd	BU	Jacques Joubert – PP GW	Linna and Prendergast	29:15	3–0 BU
2nd	Maine	Tim Lovell	Frenette and Thompson	34:51	3–1 BU
3rd	Maine	Trevor Roenick – PP	Rodrigue and Tory	40:31	3–2 BU
3rd	BU	Mike Sylvia	Bates and Pandolfo	45:23	4–2 BU
3rd	BU	Chris O'Sullivan – PP	Brennan and Grier	48:30	5–2 BU
3rd	BU	Bob Lachance – SH	Thornton	58:47	6–2 BU
Penalty summary
Period	Team	Player	Penalty	Time	PIM
1st	BU	Mike Sylvia	High-sticking	2:13	2:00
1st	Maine	Tim Lovell	High-sticking	2:13	2:00
1st	BU	Shawn Bates	Interference	8:32	2:00
1st	BU	Shane Johnson	Interference	11:26	2:00
1st	Maine	Brad Mahoney	Roughing	13:50	2:00
1st	Maine	Jamie Thompson	Cross-checking	16:25	2:00
1st	BU	Chris O'Sullivan	Cross-checking	17:53	2:00
2nd	BU	Chris Drury	Interference	23:19	2:00
2nd	Maine	Dan Shermerhorn	Interference	28:42	2:00
2nd	BU	Shane Johnson	Interference	38:20	2:00
2nd	BU	Kaj Linna	Slashing	39:44	2:00
3rd
3rd	Maine	Reg Cardinal	Holding	47:41	2:00
3rd	BU	Kaj Linna	Holding	52:17	2:00
3rd	Maine	Jason Mansoff	Holding	55:26	2:00
3rd	BU	Jacques Joubert	Elbowing	55:26	2:00
3rd	BU	Bench	Too many men (served by Ken Rausch)	56:59	2:00

Shots by period
Team	1	2	3	T
Maine	9	5	9	23
Boston University	11	14	14	39

Goaltenders
Team	Name	Saves	Goals against	Time on ice
Maine	Blair Allison	33	5	58:28
BU	Tom Noble	21	2	60:00

== All-Tournament team ==
- G: Blair Allison (Maine)
- D: Chris Imes (Maine)
- D: Kaj Linna (Boston University)
- F: Shawn Bates (Boston University)
- F: Chris O'Sullivan* (Boston University)
- F: Dan Shermerhorn (Maine)

* Most Outstanding Player(s)

== Record by conference ==
Conference	# of Bids	Record	Win %	Regional semifinals	Frozen Four	Championship Game	Champions
WCHA	4	4-4	.500	4	1	-	-
CCHA	3	2-3	.400	2	1	-	-
Hockey East	3	5-2	.714	2	2	2	1
ECAC	2	0-2	.000	-	-	-	-
