= Tim Murray (disambiguation) =

Tim Murray was the Lieutenant Governor of Massachusetts.

Tim Murray may also refer to:

- Tim Murray (archaeologist) (born 1955), Australian archaeologist
- Tim Murray (ice hockey executive) (born 1963), former general manager for the Buffalo Sabres of the National Hockey League
- Tim Murray (ice hockey player) (born 1974), Canadian former ice hockey defenceman who starred with the New Hampshire Wildcats in the 1990s
- Tim Murray (rapper), American rapper
- Tim Murray (soccer) (born 1987), American soccer player
