= List of All-Hockey East Teams =

The All-Hockey East Teams are composed of all players from teams that are members of Hockey East, an NCAA Division I hockey-only conference. Each year, from the 1984–85 season onward, at the conclusion of the Hockey East regular season, the head coaches of each team vote for players to be placed on each all-conference team. The First, Second, and Rookie Teams have been named in each ECAC Hockey season, except for 1985–86, in which no Rookie Team was named.

The all-conference teams are composed of one goaltender, two defensemen, and three forwards. If a tie occurs for the final selection of any position, both players are included as part of the greater all-conference team. However, if a tie resulted in an increase in the number of superior all-stars, the inferior team would not be reduced in number, which happened in the 1985–86 and 2009–10 seasons. Players may only appear once per year on any of the first or second teams, but freshman may appear on both the rookie team and one of the other all-conference teams in a single year. While many freshmen have wound up on the Second Team, only eight, Brian Leetch, Paul Kariya, Jon Gillies, Jack Eichel, Cayden Primeau, Devon Levi, Scott Morrow, and Lane Hutson have managed to make the First Team. Rob Gaudreau is thus far the only player to appear on the All-Star teams in more than one position, forward and defense.

From the 1994–95 through the 1995–97 seasons, no distinction was made between a first or second team, and all players were listed as part of an All-Star team. The Rookie Team was known as the 'Freshman Team' until the 1989–90 season.

Six Hockey East teams were members of ECAC Hockey until the end of the 1983–84 season, while Vermont became a Hockey East member in 2005–06. Additional conference expansion in the 2010s has seen Notre Dame join Hockey East in the 2013–14 season and Connecticut in the 2014–15 season.

In 2016–17, Hockey East expanded the all-star voting to include a Third team.

== All-conference teams ==
=== First Team ===
==== 1980s ====
1984–85
Player	Pos	Team
Chris Terreri	G	Providence
Jim Averill	D	Northeastern
Peter Taglianetti	D	Providence
Tim Army	F	Providence
John Cullen	F	Boston University
Rod Isbister	F	Northeastern

1985–86
Player	Pos	Team
Scott Gordon	G	Boston College
Scott Shaunessy	D	Boston University
Claude Lodin	D	Northeastern
David Quinn	D	Boston University
Scott Harlow	F	Boston College
John Cullen	F	Boston University
Jay Heinbuck	F	Northeastern

1986–87
Player	Pos	Team
Bruce Racine	G	Northeastern
Brian Leetch	D	Boston College
Eric Weinrich	D	Maine
Craig Janney	F	Boston College
Jon Morris	F	Lowell
Kevin Stevens	F	Boston College

1987–88
Player	Pos	Team
Scott King	G	Maine
Jack Capuano	D	Maine
Brian Dowd	D	Northeastern
Mike McHugh	F	Maine
Dave Capuano	F	Maine
David O'Brien	F	Northeastern

1988–89
Player	Pos	Team
David Littman	G	Boston College
Greg Brown	D	Boston College
Jim Hughes	D	Providence
Dave Capuano	F	Maine
Tim Sweeney	F	Boston College
Dave Buda	F	Northeastern

==== 1990s ====
1989–90
Player	Pos	Team
Scott King	G	Maine
Greg Brown	D	Boston College
Rob Cowie	D	Northeastern
Steve Heinze	F	Boston College
David Emma	F	Boston College
Mike Boback	F	Providence

1990–91
Player	Pos	Team
Scott LaGrand	G	Boston College
Keith Carney	D	Maine
Ted Crowley	D	Boston College
David Emma	F	Boston College
Shawn McEachern	F	Boston University
Jean-Yves Roy	F	Maine

1991–92
Player	Pos	Team
Mark Richards	G	UMass Lowell
Tom Dion	D	Boston University
Rob Gaudreau	D	Providence
Mike Boback	F	Providence
Scott Pellerin	F	Maine
David Sacco	F	Boston University

1992–93
Player	Pos	Team
Mike Dunham	G	Maine
Chris Imes	D	Maine
Kevin O'Sullivan	D	Boston University
Paul Kariya	F	Maine
Jim Montgomery	F	Maine
David Sacco	F	Boston University

1993–94
Player	Pos	Team
Dwayne Roloson	G	UMass Lowell
Rich Brennan	D	Boston University
François Bouchard	D	Northeastern
Shane Henry	F	UMass Lowell
Jacques Joubert	F	Boston University
Mike Taylor	F	Northeastern

1994–95*
Player	Pos	Team
Blair Allison	G	Maine
Martin Legault	G	Merrimack
Chris Imes	D	Maine
Kaj Linna	D	Boston University
Dan McGillis	D	Northeastern
Jeff Tory	D	Maine
Greg Bullock	F	UMass Lowell
Mike Grier	F	Boston University
Eric Flinton	F	New Hampshire
Chris O'Sullivan	F	Boston University
Jordan Shields	F	Northeastern
Chad Quenneville	F	Providence

1995–96*
Player	Pos	Team
Blair Allison	G	Maine
Dan Dennis	G	Providence
Todd Hall	D	New Hampshire
Jon Coleman	D	Boston University
Jeff Tory	D	Maine
Dan McGillis	D	Northeastern
Chris Drury	F	Boston University
Tim Lovell	F	Maine
David Hymovitz	F	Boston College
Mark Mowers	F	New Hampshire
Chris Sbrocca	F	UMass Lowell
Jay Pandolfo	F	Boston University

1996–97*
Player	Pos	Team
Martin Legault	G	Merrimack
Tom Noble	G	Boston University
Jason Mansoff	D	Maine
Jon Coleman	D	Boston University
Mike Nicholishen	D	UMass Lowell
Tim Murray	D	New Hampshire
Chris Drury	F	Boston University
Neil Donovan	F	UMass Lowell
Eric Boguniecki	F	New Hampshire
Marty Reasoner	F	Boston College
Mark Mowers	F	New Hampshire
Jason Krog	F	New Hampshire

1997–98
Player	Pos	Team
Marc Robitaille	G	Northeastern
Mike Mottau	D	Boston College
Tom Poti	D	Boston University
Chris Drury	F	Boston University
Jason Krog	F	New Hampshire
Marty Reasoner	F	Boston College

1998–99
Player	Pos	Team
Michel Larocque	G	Boston University
Jayme Filipowicz	D	New Hampshire
David Cullen	D	Maine
Brian Gionta	F	Boston College
Jason Krog	F	New Hampshire
Steve Kariya	F	Maine

==== 2000s ====
1999–00
Player	Pos	Team
Ty Conklin	G	New Hampshire
Chris Dyment	D	Boston University
Mike Mottau	D	Boston College
Jeff Farkas	F	Boston College
Brian Gionta	F	Boston College
Cory Larose	F	Maine

2000–01
Player	Pos	Team
Ty Conklin	G	New Hampshire
Bobby Allen	D	Boston College
Ron Hainsey	D	UMass Lowell
Brian Gionta	F	Boston College
Carl Corazzini	F	Boston University
Devin Rask	F	Providence

2001–02
Player	Pos	Team
Mike Morrison	G	Maine
Jim Fahey	D	Northeastern
Peter Metcalf	D	Maine
Darren Haydar	F	New Hampshire
Colin Hemingway	F	New Hampshire
Tony Voce	F	Boston College

2002–03
Player	Pos	Team
Mike Ayers	G	New Hampshire
Freddy Meyer	D	Boston University
Francis Nault	D	Maine
Ben Eaves	F	Boston College
Lanny Gare	F	New Hampshire
Martin Kariya	F	Maine

2003–04
Player	Pos	Team
Jimmy Howard	G	Maine
Thomas Pöck	D	Massachusetts
Stephen Wood	D	Providence
Steve Saviano	F	New Hampshire
Ryan Shannon	F	Boston College
Tony Voce	F	Boston College

2004–05
Player	Pos	Team
Keni Gibson	G	Northeastern
Andrew Alberts	D	Boston College
Bryan Miller	D	Boston University
Patrick Eaves	F	Boston College
Jason Guerriero	F	Northeastern
Ryan Shannon	F	Boston College

2005–06
Player	Pos	Team
John Curry	G	Boston University
Peter Harrold	D	Boston College
Dan Spang	D	Boston University
Brian Boyle	F	Boston College
Chris Collins	F	Boston College
Greg Moore	F	Maine

2006–07
Player	Pos	Team
John Curry	G	Boston University
Sean Sullivan	D	Boston University
Matt Gilroy	D	Boston University
Brian Boyle	F	Boston College
Trevor Smith	F	New Hampshire
Michel Léveillé	F	Maine

2007–08
Player	Pos	Team
Kevin Regan	G	New Hampshire
Brad Flaishans	D	New Hampshire
Matt Gilroy	D	Boston University
Nathan Gerbe	F	Boston College
Bryan Ewing	F	Boston University
Pete MacArthur	F	Boston University
Mike Radja	F	New Hampshire

2008–09
Player	Pos	Team
Brad Thiessen	G	Northeastern
Matt Gilroy	D	Boston University
Maury Edwards	D	UMass Lowell
Colin Wilson	F	Boston University
Viktor Stålberg	F	Vermont
James Marcou	F	Massachusetts

==== 2010s ====
2009–10
Player	Pos	Team
Brian Foster	G	New Hampshire
Justin Braun	D	Massachusetts
Colby Cohen	D	Boston University
Blake Kessel	D	New Hampshire
Bobby Butler	F	New Hampshire
Brian Gibbons	F	Boston College
Gustav Nyquist	F	Maine

2010–11
Player	Pos	Team
John Muse	G	Boston College
Brian Dumoulin	D	Boston College
Blake Kessel	D	New Hampshire
Cam Atkinson	F	Boston College
Gustav Nyquist	F	Maine
Paul Thompson	F	New Hampshire

2011–12
Player	Pos	Team
Joe Cannata	G	Merrimack
Adam Clendening	D	Boston University
Brian Dumoulin	D	Boston College
Spencer Abbott	F	Maine
Barry Almeida	F	Boston College
Brian Flynn	F	Maine

2012–13
Player	Pos	Team
Jon Gillies	G	Providence
Chad Ruhwedel	D	UMass Lowell
Trevor van Riemsdyk	D	New Hampshire
Mike Collins	F	Merrimack
Johnny Gaudreau	F	Boston College
Steven Whitney	F	Boston College

2013–14
Player	Pos	Team
Connor Hellebuyck	G	UMass Lowell
Ben Hutton	D	Maine
Mike Matheson	D	Boston College
Kevin Hayes	F	Boston College
Johnny Gaudreau	F	Boston College
Devin Shore	F	Maine

2014–15
Player	Pos	Team
Jon Gillies	G	Providence
Matt Grzelcyk	D	Boston University
Robbie Russo	D	Notre Dame
Jack Eichel	F	Boston University
Kevin Roy	F	Northeastern
Vince Hinostroza	F	Notre Dame

2015–16
Player	Pos	Team
Thatcher Demko	G	Boston College
Matt Grzelcyk	D	Boston University
Jake Walman	D	Providence
Ryan Fitzgerald	F	Boston College
Mark Jankowski	F	Providence
Danny O'Regan	F	Boston University
Andrew Poturalski	F	New Hampshire

2016–17
Player	Pos	Team
Cal Petersen	G	Notre Dame
Charlie McAvoy	D	Boston University
Jake Walman	D	Providence
Zach Aston-Reese	F	Northeastern
Anders Bjork	F	Notre Dame
Tyler Kelleker	F	New Hampshire

2017–18
Player	Pos	Team
Cayden Primeau	G	Northeastern
Jacob Bryson	D	Providence
Jérémy Davies	D	Northeastern
Erik Foley	F	Providence
Adam Gaudette	F	Northeastern
Dylan Sikura	F	Northeastern

2018–19
Player	Pos	Team
Cayden Primeau	G	Northeastern
Jérémy Davies	D	Northeastern
Cale Makar	D	Massachusetts
Mitchell Chaffee	F	Massachusetts
David Cotton	F	Boston College
Josh Wilkins	F	Providence

==== 2020s ====
2019–20
Player	Pos	Team
Jeremy Swayman	G	Maine
Michael Callahan	D	Providence
David Farrance	D	Boston University
Jack Dugan	F	Providence
John Leonard	F	Massachusetts
Tyler Madden	F	Northeastern

2020–21
Player	Pos	Team
Spencer Knight	G	Boston College
David Farrance	D	Boston University
Drew Helleson	D	Boston College
Matthew Boldy	F	Boston College
Jonny Evans	F	Connecticut
Bobby Trivigno	F	Massachusetts

2021–22
Player	Pos	Team
Devon Levi	G	Northeastern
Jordan Harris	D	Northeastern
Scott Morrow	D	Massachusetts
Aidan McDonough	F	Northeastern
Bobby Trivigno	F	Massachusetts
Ryan Tverberg	F	Connecticut

2022–23
Player	Pos	Team
Devon Levi	G	Northeastern
Domenick Fensore	D	Boston University
Lane Hutson	D	Boston University
Matt Brown	F	Boston University
Alex Jefferies	F	Merrimack
Aidan McDonough	F	Northeastern

2023–24
Player	Pos	Team
Jacob Fowler	G	Boston College
Lane Hutson	D	Boston University
Ryan Ufko	D	Massachusetts
Macklin Celebrini	F	Boston University
Cutter Gauthier	F	Boston College
Will Smith	F	Boston College

==== First Team players by school ====
School	Winners
Boston College	57
Boston University	51
Maine	38
Northeastern	36
New Hampshire	28
Providence	22
UMass Lowell	14
Massachusetts	9
Merrimack	5
Notre Dame	4
Connecticut	2
Vermont	1

==== First Team players by school (including ECAC Appearances) ====
School	Winners
Boston University	83
Boston College	71
Maine	40
New Hampshire	39
Northeastern	36
Providence	32
Vermont	19
UMass Lowell	12
Massachusetts	9
Merrimack	5
Notre Dame	4
Connecticut	2

==== Multiple appearances ====
Player	First Team appearances
Chris Drury	3
Matt Gilroy	3
Brian Gionta	3
Jason Krog	3
many players tied with	2

=== Second Team ===
==== 1980s ====
1984–85
Player	Pos	Team
Bruce Racine	G	Northeastern
Scott Shaunessy	D	Boston University
Paul Ames	D	Lowell
Doug Brown	F	Boston College
Bob Sweeney	F	Boston College
Scott Harlow	F	Boston College

1985–86
Player	Pos	Team
Terry Taillefer	G	Boston University
Bob Emery	D	Boston College
Paul Fitzsimmons	D	Northeastern
Gord Cruickshank	F	Providence
Doug Brown	F	Boston College
Clark Donatelli	F	Boston University

1986–87
Player	Pos	Team
Dave Delfino	G	Lowell
Jack Capuano	D	Maine
Paul Ames	D	Lowell
Dan Shea	F	Boston College
Gord Cruickshank	F	Providence
John Cullen	F	Boston University

1987–88
Player	Pos	Team
David Littman	G	Boston College
Carl Valimont	D	Lowell
Claude Lodin	D	Northeastern
Mike Golden	F	Maine
Mike Kelfer	F	Boston University
Dan Shea	F	Boston College

1988–89
Player	Pos	Team
Scott King	G	Maine
Bob Beers	D	Maine
Rob Cowie	D	Northeastern
David Emma	F	Boston College
Mike Kelfer	F	Boston University
Harry Mews	F	Northeastern

==== 1990s ====
1989–90
Player	Pos	Team
Scott Cashman	G	Boston University
Jeff Serowik	D	Providence
Keith Carney	D	Maine
Rick Bennett	F	Providence
Shawn McEachern	F	Boston University
Harry Mews	F	Northeastern

1990–91
Player	Pos	Team
Jeff Levy	G	New Hampshire
Shaun Kane	D	Maine
Rob Cowie	D	Northeastern
Jim Montgomery	F	Maine
Rob Gaudreau	F	Providence
Tony Amonte	F	Boston University

1991–92
Player	Pos	Team
Garth Snow	G	Maine
Chris Imes	D	Maine
Kevin O'Sullivan	D	Boston University
Jim Montgomery	F	Maine
Scott Morrow	F	New Hampshire
Jean-Yves Roy	F	Maine

1992–93
Player	Pos	Team
Garth Snow	G	Maine
Kaj Linna	D	Boston University
Chris Therien	D	Providence
Rob Donovan	F	New Hampshire
Shane Henry	F	UMass Lowell
Mike Murray	F	UMass Lowell

1993–94
Player	Pos	Team
Derek Herlofsky	G	Boston University
Scott Malone	D	New Hampshire
Michael Spalla	D	Northeastern
Jean-Francois Aube	F	UMass Lowell
Mike Latendresse	F	Maine
Greg Bullock	F	UMass Lowell

1994–95*
Player	Pos	Team
Blair Allison	G	Maine
Martin Legault	G	Merrimack
Chris Imes	D	Maine
Kaj Linna	D	Boston University
Dan McGillis	D	Northeastern
Jeff Tory	D	Maine
Greg Bullock	F	UMass Lowell
Mike Grier	F	Boston University
Eric Flinton	F	New Hampshire
Chris O'Sullivan	F	Boston University
Jordan Shields	F	Northeastern
Chad Quenneville	F	Providence

1995–96*
Player	Pos	Team
Blair Allison	G	Maine
Dan Dennis	G	Providence
Todd Hall	D	New Hampshire
Jon Coleman	D	Boston University
Jeff Tory	D	Maine
Dan McGillis	D	Northeastern
Chris Drury	F	Boston University
Tim Lovell	F	Maine
David Hymovitz	F	Boston College
Mark Mowers	F	New Hampshire
Chris Sbrocca	F	UMass Lowell
Jay Pandolfo	F	Boston University

1996–97*
Player	Pos	Team
Martin Legault	G	Merrimack
Tom Noble	G	Boston University
Jason Mansoff	D	Maine
Jon Coleman	D	Boston University
Mike Nicholishen	D	UMass Lowell
Tim Murray	D	New Hampshire
Chris Drury	F	Boston University
Neil Donovan	F	UMass Lowell
Eric Boguniecki	F	New Hampshire
Marty Reasoner	F	Boston College
Mark Mowers	F	New Hampshire
Jason Krog	F	New Hampshire

1997–98
Player	Pos	Team
Michel Larocque	G	Boston University
Chris Kelleher	D	Boston University
Mike Nicholishen	D	UMass Lowell
Derek Bekar	F	New Hampshire
Brian Gionta	F	Boston College
Mark Mowers	F	New Hampshire

1998–99
Player	Pos	Team
Ty Conklin	G	New Hampshire
Mike Mottau	D	Boston College
Anthony Cappelletti	D	UMass Lowell
Mike Omicioli	F	Providence
Rejean Stringer	F	Merrimack
Darren Haydar	F	New Hampshire

==== 2000s ====
1999–00
Player	Pos	Team
Rick DiPietro	G	Boston University
Bobby Allen	D	Boston College
Pat Aufiero	D	Boston University
Blake Bellefeuille	F	Boston College
Michael Souza	F	New Hampshire
Darren Haydar	F	New Hampshire

2000–01
Player	Pos	Team
Nolan Schaefer	G	Providence
Jim Fahey	D	Northeastern
Matt Libby	D	Providence
Anthony Aquino	F	Merrimack
Chuck Kobasew	F	Boston College
Krys Kolanos	F	Boston College

2001–02
Player	Pos	Team
Mike Ayers	G	New Hampshire
Chris Dyment	D	Boston University
Garrett Stafford	D	New Hampshire
Niko Dimitrakos	F	Maine
Ben Eaves	F	Boston College
Ed McGrane	F	UMass Lowell

2002–03
Player	Pos	Team
Joe Exter	G	Merrimack
J. D. Forrest	D	Boston College
Thomas Pöck	D	Massachusetts
Stephen Wood	D	Providence
Colin Hemingway	F	New Hampshire
Lucas Lawson	F	Maine
Ed McGrane	F	UMass Lowell

2003–04
Player	Pos	Team
Matti Kaltiainen	G	Boston College
Andrew Alberts	D	Boston College
Prestin Ryan	D	Maine
Patrick Eaves	F	Boston College
Todd Jackson	F	Maine
Colin Shields	F	Maine

2004–05
Player	Pos	Team
John Curry	G	Boston University
Bryan Schmidt	D	Merrimack
Brian Yandle	D	New Hampshire
Sean Collins	F	New Hampshire
Mike Morris	F	Northeastern
Ben Walter	F	UMass Lowell

2005–06
Player	Pos	Team
Cory Schneider	G	Boston College
Marvin Degon	D	Massachusetts
Brian Yandle	D	New Hampshire
Michel Léveillé	F	Maine
Pete MacArthur	F	Boston University
Daniel Winnik	F	New Hampshire

2006–07
Player	Pos	Team
Jonathan Quick	G	Massachusetts
Chris Murray	D	New Hampshire
Mike Lundin	D	Maine
Josh Soares	F	Maine
Pete MacArthur	F	Boston University
Nathan Gerbe	F	Boston College

2007–08
Player	Pos	Team
Ben Bishop	G	Maine
Mike Kostka	D	Massachusetts
Craig Switzer	D	New Hampshire
Matt Taormina	D	Providence
Kory Falite	F	UMass Lowell
Matt Fornataro	F	New Hampshire
Joe Vitale	F	Northeastern

2008–09
Player	Pos	Team
Kieran Millan	G	Boston University
Justin Braun	D	Massachusetts
Kevin Shattenkirk	D	Boston University
Brock Bradford	F	Boston College
Ryan Ginand	F	Northeastern
James van Riemsdyk	F	New Hampshire

==== 2010s ====
2009–10
Player	Pos	Team
Carter Hutton	G	UMass Lowell
Jeremy Dehner	D	UMass Lowell
Jeff Dimmen	D	Maine
Cam Atkinson	F	Boston College
Stéphane Da Costa	F	Merrimack
James Marcou	F	Massachusetts

2010–11
Player	Pos	Team
Kieran Millan	G	Boston University
Josh Van Dyk	D	Maine
David Warsofsky	D	Boston University
Stéphane Da Costa	F	Merrimack
Brian Gibbons	F	Boston College
Wade MacLeod	F	Northeastern

2011–12
Player	Pos	Team
Doug Carr	G	UMass Lowell
Garrett Noonan	D	Boston University
Karl Stollery	D	Merrimack
Chris Connolly	F	Boston University
Joey Diamond	F	Maine
Chris Kreider	F	Boston College

2012–13
Player	Pos	Team
Connor Hellebuyck	G	UMass Lowell
Jordan Heywood	D	Merrimack
Patrick Wey	D	Boston College
Joseph Pendenza	F	UMass Lowell
Evan Rodrigues	F	Boston University
Riley Wetmore	F	UMass Lowell

2013–14
Player	Pos	Team
Clay Witt	G	Northeastern
Stephen Johns	D	Notre Dame
Eric Knodel	D	New Hampshire
Josh Manson	D	Northeastern
Kevin Goumas	F	New Hampshire
Chris McCarthy	F	Vermont
Kevin Roy	F	Northeastern

2014–15
Player	Pos	Team
Matt O'Connor	G	Boston University
Noah Hanifin	D	Boston College
Mike Paliotta	D	Vermont
Danny O'Regan	D	Boston University
Evan Rodrigues	F	Boston University
Devin Shore	F	Maine

2015–16
Player	Pos	Team
Kevin Boyle	G	UMass Lowell
Jordan Gross	D	Notre Dame
Ian McCoshen	D	Boston College
Zach Aston-Reese	F	Northeastern
Anders Bjork	F	Notre Dame
Maxim Letunov	F	Connecticut
Colin White	F	Boston College

2016–17
Player	Pos	Team
Jake Oettinger	G	Boston University
Michael Kapla	D	UMass Lowell
Dylan Zink	D	UMass Lowell
Joe Gambardella	F	UMass Lowell
Clayton Keller	F	Boston University
Dylan Sikura	F	Northeastern

2017–18
Player	Pos	Team
Hayden Hawkey	G	Providence
Dante Fabbro	D	Boston University
Casey Fitzgerald	D	Boston College
Bobo Carpenter	F	Boston University
Maxim Letunov	F	Connecticut
Nolan Stevens	F	Northeastern

2018–19
Player	Pos	Team
Stefanos Lekkas	G	Vermont
Jacob Bryson	D	Providence
Dante Fabbro	D	Boston University
John Leonard	F	Massachusetts
Chase Pearson	F	Maine
Jacob Pritchard	F	Massachusetts

==== 2020s ====
2019–20
Player	Pos	Team
Spencer Knight	G	Boston College
Ben Finklestein	D	Boston College
Ryan Shea	D	Northeastern
Wyatt Newpower	D	Connecticut
Mitchell Fossier	F	Maine
Alex Newhook	F	Boston College
Tyce Thompson	F	Providence

2020–21
Player	Pos	Team
Filip Lindberg	G	Massachusetts
Jordan Harris	D	Northeastern
Zac Jones	D	Massachusetts
Jackson Pierson	F	New Hampshire
Zach Solow	F	Northeastern
Tyce Thompson	F	Providence

2021–22
Player	Pos	Team
Owen Savory	G	UMass Lowell
Declan Carlile	D	Merrimack
Domenick Fensore	D	Boston University
Jachym Kondelik	F	Connecticut
Jack McBain	F	Boston College
Wilmer Skoog	F	Boston University

2022–23
Player	Pos	Team
Victor Östman	G	Maine
Scott Morrow	D	Massachusetts
Ryan Ufko	D	Massachusetts
Lynden Breen	F	Maine
Justin Hryckowian	F	Northeastern
Ryan Tverberg	F	Connecticut

2023–24
Player	Pos	Team
Michael Hrabal	G	Massachusetts
Eamon Powell	D	Boston College
Tom Willander	D	Boston University
Ryan Leonard	F	Boston College
Bradly Nadeau	F	Maine
Gabe Perreault	F	Boston College

==== Second Team players by school ====
School	Winners
Boston University	49
Boston College	40
Maine	38
New Hampshire	30
UMass Lowell	30
Northeastern	28
Providence	18
Massachusetts	13
Merrimack	11
Connecticut	5
Notre Dame	3
Vermont	3

==== Second Team players by school (including ECAC Appearances) ====
School	Winners
Boston University	71
Boston College	56
Maine	39
New Hampshire	38
Northeastern	31
Providence	30
UMass Lowell	30
Massachusetts	13
Vermont	12
Merrimack	11
Connecticut	5
Notre Dame	3

==== Multiple appearances ====
Player	Second Team appearances
Mark Mowers	3
many players tied with	2

=== Third Team ===
==== 2010s ====
2016–17
Player	Pos	Team
Collin Delia	G	Merrimack
Dennis Gilbert	D	Notre Dame
Scott Savage	D	Boston College
Austin Cangelosi	F	Boston College
Adam Gaudette	F	Northeastern
Tage Thompson	F	Connecticut

2017–18
Player	Pos	Team
Joseph Woll	G	Boston College
Michael Kim	D	Boston College
Cale Makar	D	Massachusetts
Brett Seney	F	Merrimack
Brian Pinho	F	Providence
Jordan Greenway	F	Boston University

2018–19
Player	Pos	Team
Jeremy Swayman	G	Maine
Marc Del Gaizo	D	Massachusetts
Mario Ferraro	D	Massachusetts
Brady Keeper	D	Maine
Brandon Duhaime	F	Providence
Karl El-Mir	F	Connecticut
Mitchell Fossier	F	Maine

==== 2020s ====
2019–20
Player	Pos	Team
Tyler Wall	G	UMass Lowell
Max Gildon	D	New Hampshire
Jesper Mattila	D	Boston College
Jake McLaughlin	D	Massachusetts
David Cotton	F	Boston College
Patrick Harper	F	Boston University
Trevor Zegras	F	Boston University

2020–21
Player	Pos	Team
Tomáš Vomáčka	G	Connecticut
Marc Del Gaizo	D	Massachusetts
Matthew Kessel	D	Massachusetts
Angus Crookshank	D	New Hampshire
Jáchym Kondelík	F	Connecticut
Marc McLaughlin	F	Boston College

2021–22
Player	Pos	Team
Matt Murray	G	Massachusetts
Max Crozier	D	Providence
Matthew Kessel	D	Massachusetts
Jack St. Ivany	D	Boston College
Brett Berard	F	Providence
Carl Berglund	F	UMass Lowell
Andre Lee	F	UMass Lowell

2022–23
Player	Pos	Team
Gustavs Davis Grigals	G	UMass Lowell
Hugo Ollas	G	Merrimack
Max Crozier	D	Providence
Jon McDonald	D	UMass Lowell
Cutter Gauthier	F	Boston College
Parker Ford	F	Providence
Wilmer Skoog	F	Boston University

2023–24
Player	Pos	Team
Mathieu Caron	G	Boston University
Alex Gagne	D	New Hampshire
Scott Morrow	D	Massachusetts
Alex Campbell	F	Northeastern
Justin Hryckowian	F	Northeastern
Josh Nadeau	F	Maine

==== Third Team players by school ====
School	Winners
Boston College	9
Massachusetts	9
Providence	6
Boston University	5
UMass Lowell	5
Connecticut	4
Maine	4
Merrimack	3
New Hampshire	3
Northeastern	3
Notre Dame	1
Vermont	0

==== Multiple appearances ====
Player	Third team appearances
Marc Del Gaizo	2
Matthew Kessel	2
Max Crozier	2

=== Rookie Team ===
==== 1980s ====
1984–85
Player	Pos	Team
Bruce Racine	G	Northeastern
Shawn Whitham	D	Providence
Paul Cavallini	D	Providence
Ken Hodge	F	Boston College
Jon Morris	F	Lowell
Stephen Leach	F	New Hampshire
Clark Donatelli	F	Boston University

1985–86
No Team Selected

1986–87
Player	Pos	Team
Matt Merten	G	Providence
Brian Leetch	D	Boston College
Greg Brown	D	Boston College
Dave Capuano	F	Maine
Randy LeBrasseur	F	Lowell
Rick Bennett	F	Providence

1987–88
Player	Pos	Team
Pat Morrison	G	New Hampshire
Will Averill	D	Northeastern
Tom Dion	D	Boston University
David Emma	F	Boston College
Mario Thyer	F	Maine
Chris Winnes	F	New Hampshire

1988–89
Player	Pos	Team
Mark Richards	G	Lowell
Keith Carney	D	Maine
Shaun Kane	D	Providence
Rob Gaudreau	F	Providence
Steve Heinze	F	Boston College
Scott Pellerin	F	Maine

==== 1990s ====
1989–90
Player	Pos	Team
Scott Cashman	G	Boston University
Peter Ahola	D	Boston University
Ted Crowley	D	Boston College
Tony Amonte	F	Boston University
Jim Montgomery	F	Maine
Jean-Yves Roy	F	Maine

1990–91
Player	Pos	Team
Jeff Levy	G	New Hampshire
Scott Lachance	D	Boston University
Chris Therien	D	Providence
Keith Tkachuk	F	Boston University
Mike Taylor	F	Northeastern
Patrice Tardif	F	Maine

1991–92
Player	Pos	Team
Todd Reynolds	G	Northeastern
Ian Moran	D	Boston College
Rich Brennan	D	Boston University
Craig Darby	F	Providence
John Lilley	F	Boston University
Mike Pendergast	F	Boston University

1992–93
Player	Pos	Team
Mike Veisor	G	Northeastern
David MacIsaac	D	Maine
Dan McGillis	D	Northeastern
Chris Ferraro	F	Maine
Mark Goble	F	Merrimack
Paul Kariya	F	Maine

1993–94
Player	Pos	Team
Greg Taylor	G	Boston College
John Jakopin	D	Merrimack
Tim Murray	D	New Hampshire
Shawn Bates	F	Boston University
Eric Boguniecki	F	New Hampshire
Greg Bullock	F	UMass Lowell

1994–95
Player	Pos	Team
Brian Regan	G	Massachusetts
Jeff Tory	D	Maine
Chris Kelleher	D	Boston University
Mark Mowers	F	New Hampshire
Shawn Wansborough	F	Maine
Casey Kesselring	F	Merrimack

1995–96
Player	Pos	Team
Michel Larocque	G	Boston University
Brett Clark	D	Maine
Darrel Scoville	D	Merrimack
Marty Reasoner	F	Boston College
Derek Bekar	F	New Hampshire
Steve Kariya	F	Maine

1996–97
Player	Pos	Team
Sean Matile	G	New Hampshire
Tom Poti	D	Boston University
Mike Mottau	D	Boston College
Greg Koehler	F	UMass Lowell
Michael Souza	F	New Hampshire
Cory Larose	F	Maine

1997–98
Player	Pos	Team
Boyd Ballard	G	Providence
Scott Clemmensen	G	Boston College
Bobby Allen	D	Boston College
Rob Scuderi	D	Boston College
Carl Corazzini	F	Boston University
Brian Cummings	F	Northeastern
Brian Gionta	F	Boston College
Matthias Trattnig	F	Maine

1998–99
Player	Pos	Team
Ty Conklin	G	New Hampshire
Peter Metcalf	D	Maine
Jim Fahey	D	Northeastern
Darren Haydar	F	New Hampshire
Barrett Heisten	F	Maine
Willie Levesque	F	Northeastern
Greg Classen	F	Merrimack

==== 2000s ====
1999–00
Player	Pos	Team
Rick DiPietro	G	Boston University
Ron Hainsey	D	UMass Lowell
Freddy Meyer	D	Boston University
Anthony Aquino	F	Merrimack
Brian Collins	F	Boston University
Peter Fregoe	F	Providence
Krys Kolanos	F	Boston College

2000–01
Player	Pos	Team
Joe Exter	G	Merrimack
J. D. Forrest	D	Boston College
Regan Kelly	D	Providence
Ben Eaves	F	Boston College
Chuck Kobasew	F	Boston College
Laurent Meunier	F	UMass Lowell

2001–02
Player	Pos	Team
Keni Gibson	G	Northeastern
Ryan Whitney	D	Boston University
Sean Collins	F	New Hampshire
Brian McConnell	F	Boston University
Colin Shields	F	Maine
Dave Spina	F	Boston College

2002–03
Player	Pos	Team
Jimmy Howard	G	Maine
Jēkabs Rēdlihs	D	Boston University
Bryan Schmidt	D	Merrimack
Chris Collins	F	Boston College
Mike Morris	F	Northeastern
David Van der Gulik	F	Boston University
Stephen Werner	F	Massachusetts

2003–04
Player	Pos	Team
Jim Healey	G	Merrimack
Cleve Kinley	D	UMass Lowell
Kevin Schaeffer	D	Boston University
Brett Hemingway	F	New Hampshire
Michel Léveillé	F	Maine
Colin McDonald	F	Providence
Jason Tejchma	F	UMass Lowell

2004–05
Player	Pos	Team
Kevin Regan	G	New Hampshire
Cory Schneider	G	Boston College
Peter Vetri	G	UMass Lowell
David Leaderer	D	Massachusetts
Bret Tyler	D	Maine
Chris Bourque	F	Boston University
P. J. Fenton	F	Massachusetts
Pete MacArthur	F	Boston University

2005–06
Player	Pos	Team
Ben Bishop	G	Maine
Brett Motherwell	D	Boston College
Cody Wild	D	Providence
Benn Ferriero	F	Boston College
Rob Ricci	F	Merrimack
Brandon Yip	F	Boston University

2006–07
Player	Pos	Team
Brad Thiessen	G	Northeastern
Justin Braun	D	Massachusetts
Mark Fayne	D	Providence
Teddy Purcell	F	Maine
Chad Costello	F	Northeastern
Brayden Irwin	F	Vermont

2007–08
Player	Pos	Team
Paul Dainton	G	Massachusetts
Maury Edwards	D	UMass Lowell
Kevin Shattenkirk	D	Boston University
James Marcou	F	Massachusetts
Joe Whitney	F	Boston College
James van Riemsdyk	F	New Hampshire
Colin Wilson	F	Boston University

2008–09
Player	Pos	Team
Kieran Millan	G	Boston University
Karl Stollery	D	Merrimack
Chris Connolly	F	Boston University
Gustav Nyquist	F	Maine
Steve Quailer	F	Northeastern
Casey Wellman	F	Massachusetts
David Vallorani	F	UMass Lowell

==== 2010s ====
2009–10
Player	Pos	Team
Chris Rawlings	G	Northeastern
Brian Dumoulin	D	Boston College
Jake Newton	D	Northeastern
Max Nicastro	D	Boston University
Stéphane Da Costa	F	Merrimack
Chris Kreider	F	Boston College
Sebastian Stalberg	F	Vermont

2010–11
Player	Pos	Team
Dan Sullivan	G	Maine
Anthony Bitetto	D	Northeastern
Adam Clendening	D	Boston University
Bill Arnold	F	Boston College
Charlie Coyle	F	Boston University
Mike Collins	F	Merrimack
Michael Pereira	F	Massachusetts
Brodie Reid	F	Northeastern

2011–12
Player	Pos	Team
Casey DeSmith	G	New Hampshire
Zack Kamrass	D	UMass Lowell
Alexx Privitera	D	Boston University
Trevor van Riemsdyk	D	New Hampshire
Johnny Gaudreau	F	Boston College
Ross Mauermann	F	Providence
Ludwig Karlsson	F	Northeastern
Kyle Reynolds	F	Vermont
Scott Wilson	F	UMass Lowell

2012–13
Player	Pos	Team
Jon Gillies	G	Providence
Connor Hellebuyck	G	UMass Lowell
Matt Grzelcyk	D	Boston University
Mike Matheson	D	Boston College
Danny O'Regan	F	Boston University
Kevin Roy	F	Northeastern

2013–14
Player	Pos	Team
Thatcher Demko	G	Boston College
Michael Kapla	D	UMass Lowell
Steve Santini	D	Boston College
Robbie Bailargeon	F	Boston University
Vince Hinostroza	F	Notre Dame
Mario Puskarich	F	Vermont
Mike Szmatula	F	Northeastern

2014–15
Player	Pos	Team
Cal Petersen	G	Notre Dame
Noah Hanifin	D	Boston College
Brandon Montour	D	Massachusetts
Alex Tuch	F	Boston College
Jack Eichel	F	Boston University
C. J. Smith	F	UMass Lowell

2015–16
Player	Pos	Team
(None Awarded)	G	
Casey Fitzgerald	D	Boston College
Charlie McAvoy	D	Boston University
Bobby Nardella	D	Notre Dame
Colin White	F	Boston College
Jakob Forsbacka Karlsson	F	Boston University
Max Letunov	F	Connecticut

2016–17
Player	Pos	Team
Joseph Woll	G	Boston College
Jake Oettinger	G	Boston University
Andrew Peeke	D	Notre Dame
Ross Colton	F	Vermont
Patrick Grasso	F	New Hampshire
Patrick Harper	F	Boston University
Clayton Keller	F	Boston University

2017–18
Player	Pos	Team
Cayden Primeau	G	Northeastern
Jeremy Swayman	G	Maine
Cale Makar	D	Massachusetts
Mario Ferraro	D	Massachusetts
Shane Bowers	F	Boston University
Logan Hutsko	F	Boston College
Brady Tkachuk	F	Boston University

2018–19
Player	Pos	Team
Tomáš Vomáčka	G	Connecticut
Marc Del Gaizo	D	Massachusetts
Jack Dugan	F	Providence
Joel Farabee	F	Boston University
Chase Gresock	F	Merrimack
Tyler Madden	F	Northeastern

==== 2020s ====
2019–20
Player	Pos	Team
Spencer Knight	G	Boston College
Declan Carlile	D	Merrimack
Zac Jones	D	Massachusetts
Matthew Boldy	F	Boston College
Vladislav Firstov	F	Connecticut
Alex Newhook	F	Boston College
Trevor Zegras	F	Boston University

2020–21
Player	Pos	Team
Drew Commesso	G	Boston University
Eamon Powell	D	Boston College
Gunnarwolfe Fontaine	F	Northeastern
Alex Jefferies	F	Merrimack
Josh Lopina	F	Massachusetts
Nikita Nesterenko	F	Boston College
Luke Tuch	F	Boston University

2021–22
Player	Pos	Team
Devon Levi	G	Northeastern
Ty Gallagher	D	Boston University
Scott Morrow	D	Massachusetts
Ryan Ufko	D	Massachusetts
David Breazeale	D	Maine
Matt Crasa	F	UMass Lowell
Justin Hryckowian	F	Northeastern
Jack Hughes	F	Northeastern

2022–23
Player	Pos	Team
(None Awarded)	G	
Lane Hutson	D	Boston University
Hunter McDonald	D	Northeastern
Kenny Connors	F	Massachusetts
Cutter Gauthier	F	Boston College
Ryan Greene	F	Boston University
Cam Lund	F	Northeastern
Matthew Wood	F	Connecticut

2023–24
Player	Pos	Team
Jacob Fowler	G	Boston College
Macklin Celebrini	F	Boston University
Ryan Leonard	F	Boston College
Bradly Nadeau	F	Maine
Gabe Perreault	F	Boston College
Will Smith	F	Boston College

2024–25
Player	Pos	Team
Callum Tung	G	Connecticut
Cole Hutson	D	Boston University
Francesco Dell'Elce	D	Massachusetts
James Hagens	F	Boston College
Teddy Stiga	F	Boston College
Cole Eiserman	F	Boston University
Colin Kessler	F	Vermont

==== Rookie Team players by school ====
School	Winners
Boston University	55
Boston College	49
Northeastern	29
Maine	29
Massachusetts	19
New Hampshire	19
UMass Lowell	18
Providence	17
Merrimack	16
Vermont	6
Connecticut	5
Notre Dame	4

== See also ==
- Hockey East Awards
- All-ECAC Hockey Teams
