= List of Hockey East All-Tournament Teams =

The Hockey East All-Tournament Team is an honor bestowed at the conclusion of the NCAA Division I Hockey East conference tournament to the players judged to have performed the best during the championship. Currently the team is composed of three forwards, two defensemen and one goaltender with additional players named in the event of a tie. Voting for the honor is conducted by the head coaches of each member team once the tournament has completed and any player regardless of their team's finish is eligible.

The All-Tournament Team began being awarded after the first championship in 1985 and has been named every year since, excluding 2020 as the tournament was cancelled due to the coronavirus pandemic.

There have been 21 players named to the All-Tournament team despite their school not playing in the Championship game.

Two teams failed to have a player named to the All-Tournament team despite playing in the Championship game, Vermont in 2008 and UMass Lowell in 2015. Both were the runner-up schools.

== All-Tournament Teams ==
=== 1980s ===
1985
Player	Pos	Team
Chris Terreri	G	Providence
Dominic Campedelli	D	Boston College
Peter Taglianetti	D	Providence
Doug Brown	F	Boston College
Clark Donatelli	F	Boston University
Jon Morris	F	UMass Lowell

1986
Player	Pos	Team
Terry Taillefer	G	Boston University
David Quinn	D	Boston University
Scott Shaunessy	D	Boston University
Ken Hodge	F	Boston College
Peter Marshall	F	Boston University
Jeff Sveen	F	Boston University

1987
Player	Pos	Team
Al Loring	G	Maine
Brian Leetch	D	Boston College
Eric Weinrich	D	Maine
Ken Hodge	F	Boston College
Craig Janney	F	Boston College
Mike McHugh	F	Maine

1988
Player	Pos	Team
Bruce Racine	G	Northeastern
Jack Capuano	D	Maine
Brian Dowd	D	Northeastern
Mike McHugh	F	Maine
Harry Mews	F	Northeastern
Rico Rossi	F	Northeastern
Mario Thyer	F	Maine

1989
Player	Pos	Team
Matt DelGuidice	G	Maine
Bob Beers	D	Maine
Greg Brown	D	Boston College
Steve Heinze	F	Boston College
Guy Perron	F	Maine
Tim Sweeney	F	Boston College

=== 1990s ===
1990
Player	Pos	Team
Scott LaGrand	G	Boston College
Greg Brown	D	Boston College
Claudio Scremin	D	Maine
David Emma	F	Boston College
Martin Robitaille	F	Maine
Jean-Yves Roy	F	Maine

1991
Player	Pos	Team
John Bradley	G	Boston University
Peter Ahola	D	Boston University
Keith Carney	D	Maine
Sebastian Laplante	F	Northeastern
Shawn McEachern	F	Boston University
Steve Tepper	F	Maine

1992
Player	Pos	Team
Jeff Levy	G	New Hampshire
Rob Gaudreau	D	Providence
Chris Imes	D	Maine
Domenic Amodeo	F	New Hampshire
Jim Montgomery	F	Maine
Scott Pellerin	F	Maine

1993
Player	Pos	Team
Garth Snow	G	Maine
Rich Brennan	D	Boston University
Chris Imes	D	Maine
Jim Montgomery	F	Maine
Michael Murray	F	UMass Lowell
David Sacco	F	Boston University

1994
Player	Pos	Team
Dwayne Roloson	G	UMass Lowell
Rich Brennan	D	Boston University
Kaj Linna	D	Boston University
Eric Boguniecki	F	New Hampshire
Greg Bullock	F	UMass Lowell
Jacques Joubert	F	Boston University

1995
Player	Pos	Team
Bob Bell	G	Providence
Jon Coleman	D	Boston University
Chris Imes	D	Maine
Shawn Bates	F	Boston University
Brady Kramer	F	Providence
Chad Quenneville	F	Providence

1996
Player	Pos	Team
Dan Dennis	G	Providence
Justin Gould	D	Providence
Jeff Tory	D	Maine
Joe Hulbig	F	Providence
Mike Ornicioli	F	Providence
Jay Pandolfo	F	Boston University

1997
Player	Pos	Team
Michel Larocque	G	Boston University
Shane Johnson	D	Boston University
Chris Kelleher	D	Boston University
Shawn Bates	F	Boston University
Chris Bell	F	UMass Lowell
Mark Mowers	F	New Hampshire

1998
Player	Pos	Team
Alfie Michaud	G	Maine
Mike Mottau	D	Boston College
Darrel Scoville	D	Boston College
Jeff Farkas	F	Boston College
Steve Kariya	F	Maine
Marty Reasoner	F	Boston College

1999
Player	Pos	Team
Scott Clemmensen	G	Boston College
Bobby Allen	D	Boston College
Jayme Filipowicz	D	New Hampshire
Blake Bellefeuille	F	Boston College
Jeff Farkas	F	Boston College
Jason Krog	F	New Hampshire

=== 2000s ===
2000
Player	Pos	Team
Matt Yeats	G	Maine
Robert Ek	D	Maine
Mike Mottau	D	Boston College
Blake Bellefeuille	F	Boston College
Niko Dimitrakos	F	Maine
Cory Larose	F	Maine

2001
Player	Pos	Team
Scott Clemmensen	G	Boston College
Bobby Allen	D	Boston College
Regan Kelly	D	Providence
Chuck Kobasew	F	Boston College
Mike Pandolfo	F	Boston University
Tony Voce	F	Boston College

2002
Player	Pos	Team
Matt Yeats	G	Maine
Peter Metcalf	D	Maine
Garrett Stafford	D	New Hampshire
Mark Concannon	F	UMass Lowell
Darren Haydar	F	New Hampshire
Colin Hemingway	F	New Hampshire

2003
Player	Pos	Team
Sean Fields	G	Boston University
Garrett Stafford	D	New Hampshire
Thomas Pöck	D	Massachusetts
Justin Maiser	F	Boston University
Steve Saviano	F	New Hampshire
Stephen Werner	F	Massachusetts

2004
Player	Pos	Team
Jimmy Howard	G	Maine
Thomas Pöck	D	Massachusetts
Prestin Ryan	D	Maine
Greg Mauldin	F	Massachusetts
Colin Shields	F	Maine
Mike Warner	F	Massachusetts

2005
Player	Pos	Team
Cory Schneider	G	Boston College
Andrew Alberts	D	Boston College
Brian Yandle	D	New Hampshire
Brian Boyle	F	Boston College
Preston Callander	F	New Hampshire
Daniel Winnik	F	New Hampshire

2006
Player	Pos	Team
Cory Schneider	G	Boston College
Peter Harrold	D	Boston College
Dan Spang	D	Boston University
Brian Boyle	F	Boston College
Jacob Micflikier	F	New Hampshire
David Van der Gulik	F	Boston University

2007
Player	Pos	Team
Cory Schneider	G	Boston College
Brian Boyle	D	Boston College
Chris Murray	D	New Hampshire
Brock Bradford	F	Boston College
Chris Capraro	F	Massachusetts
Benn Ferriero	F	Boston College

2008
Player	Pos	Team
John Muse	G	Boston College
Michael Brennan	D	Boston College
Carl Sneep	D	Boston College
Bobby Butler	F	New Hampshire
Benn Ferriero	F	Boston College
Nathan Gerbe	F	Boston College

2009
Player	Pos	Team
Kieran Millan	G	Boston University
Maury Edwards	D	UMass Lowell
Matt Gilroy	D	Boston University
Scott Campbell	F	UMass Lowell
John McCarthy	F	Boston University
Colin Wilson	F	Boston University

=== 2010s ===
2010
Player	Pos	Team
John Muse	G	Boston College
Will O'Neill	D	Maine
Carl Sneep	D	Boston College
Joey Diamond	F	Maine
Matt Lombardi	F	Boston College
Gustav Nyquist	F	Maine

2011
Player	Pos	Team
John Muse	G	Boston College
Tommy Cross	D	Boston College
Karl Stollery	D	Merrimack
Cam Atkinson	F	Boston College
Ryan Flanigan	F	Merrimack
Brian Gibbons	F	Boston College

2012
Player	Pos	Team
Parker Milner	G	Boston College
Brian Dumoulin	D	Boston College
Will O'Neill	D	Maine
Alex Chiasson	F	Boston University
Joey Diamond	F	Boston University
Johnny Gaudreau	F	Boston College

2013
Player	Pos	Team
Connor Hellebuyck	G	UMass Lowell
Matt Grzelcyk	D	Boston University
Chad Ruhwedel	D	UMass Lowell
Danny O'Regan	F	Boston University
Evan Rodrigues	F	Boston University
Scott Wilson	F	UMass Lowell

2014
Player	Pos	Team
Connor Hellebuyck	G	UMass Lowell
Christian Folin	D	UMass Lowell
Stephen Johns	D	Notre Dame
Kevin Goumas	F	New Hampshire
Joe Pendenza	F	UMass Lowell
A. J. White	F	UMass Lowell

2015
Player	Pos	Team
Matt O'Connor	G	Boston University
Matt Grzelcyk	D	Boston University
Robbie Russo	D	Notre Dame
Jack Eichel	F	Boston University
Evan Rodrigues	F	Boston University
Grayson Downing	F	New Hampshire

2016
Player	Pos	Team
Kevin Boyle	G	UMass Lowell
Colton Saucerman	D	Northeastern
Dylan Zink	D	UMass Lowell
Nolan Stevens	F	Northeastern
Zach Aston-Reese	F	Northeastern
C.J. Smith	F	UMass Lowell

2017
Player	Pos	Team
Tyler Wall	G	UMass Lowell
Scott Savage	D	Boston College
Michael Kapla	D	UMass Lowell
Joe Gambardella	F	UMass Lowell
Ryan Fitzgerald	F	Boston College
C.J. Smith	F	UMass Lowell

2018
Player	Pos	Team
Jake Oettinger	G	Boston University
Chad Krys	D	Boston University
Jacob Bryson	D	Providence
Jordan Greenway	F	Boston University
Dylan Sikura	F	Northeastern
Brandon Duhaime	F	Providence

2019
Player	Pos	Team
Cayden Primeau	G	Northeastern
Jeremy Davies	D	Northeastern
Ryan Shea	D	Northeastern
Brandon Hawkins	F	Northeastern
Zach Solow	F	Northeastern
David Cotton	F	Boston College

=== 2020s ===
2020
Not awarded due to the COVID-19 pandemic

2021
Player	Pos	Team
Filip Lindberg	G	Massachusetts
Anthony Baxter	D	UMass Lowell
Zac Jones	D	Massachusetts
Matt Brown	F	UMass Lowell
Jake Gaudet	F	Massachusetts
Bobby Trivigno	F	Massachusetts

2022
Player	Pos	Team
Matt Murray	G	Massachusetts
John Spetz	D	Connecticut
Colin Felix	D	Massachusetts
Vladislav Firstov	F	Connecticut
Garrett Wait	F	Massachusetts
Bobby Trivigno	F	Massachusetts

2023
Player	Pos	Team
Drew Commesso	G	Boston University
Lane Hutson	D	Boston University
Christian Felton	D	Merrimack
Matt Copponi	F	Merrimack
Devin Kaplan	F	Boston University
Dylan Peterson	F	Boston University

2024
Player	Pos	Team
Jacob Fowler	G	Boston College
Eamon Powell	D	Boston College
Lane Hutson	D	Boston University
Will Smith	F	Boston College
Gabe Perreault	F	Boston College
Macklin Celebrini	F	Boston University

2025
Player	Pos	Team
Albin Boija	G	Maine
Luke Antonacci	D	Maine
David Breazeale	D	Maine
Owen Fowler	F	Maine
Harrison Scott	F	Maine
Joey Muldowney	F	Connecticut

2026
Player	Pos	Team
Max Lundgren	G	Merrimack
Nathan King	D	Merrimack
Tom Messineo	D	Connecticut
Dean Letourneau	F	Boston College
Ryan O'Connell	F	Merrimack
Trevor Hoskin	F	Merrimack

=== All-Tournament Team players by school ===
School	Winners
Boston College	59
Boston University	48
Maine	42
UMass Lowell	24
New Hampshire	19
Massachusetts	14
Northeastern	14
Providence	13
Merrimack	8
Connecticut	4
Notre Dame	2

=== Multiple appearances ===
Player	All-Tournament Team appearances
Brian Boyle	3
Chris Imes	3
John Muse	3
Cory Schneider	3
many players tied with	2

== See also ==
- Hockey East Awards
- Tournament Most Valuable Player
