= Kaj Linna (ice hockey) =

Finnish ice hockey player

- Born: 24 January 1971 (age 55) Helsinki, Finland
- Height: 6 ft 2 in (188 cm)
- Weight: 209 lb (95 kg; 14 st 13 lb)
- Position: Defenseman
- Shot: Left
- Played for: Boston University; Prince Edward Island Senators; HIFK; Milwaukee Admirals
- National team: Finland
- NHL draft: 183rd overall, 1995; Ottawa Senators
- Playing career: 1991–1998

Medal record

Representing Finland

Men's ice hockey

World Championships
Silver medal – second place	1998 Switzerland	

Kaj Linna (born 24 January 1971) is a Finnish former professional ice hockey defenseman who was a two-time All-American for Boston University and won a Liiga championship in 1998.

== Career ==
Linna was a member of Finland's under-18 team at the 1989 European championships and continued to make a name for himself in his home country. He received a scholarship to Boston University in 1991 and was part of the increased influx of European players into college hockey following the collapse of the Soviet Union. Linna was a top defenseman for the Terriers almost from the start, being named an All-American as a sophomore and helping BU reach the first of five consecutive Frozen Fours. While his offensive production dipped as a junior, he picked up the pace in the postseason and got the Terriers to make an appearance in the championship game. For his final season with BU, Linna's offense returned to normal and he was named to the All-American squad for a second time. He pushed the Terriers to a second consecutive Hockey East championship and then helped the team win the 1995 NCAA Championship, assisting on the game-winning goal in the final match.

Due to a new CBA for the NHL in 1995, Linna was eligible to be drafted despite being 24 at the time. With a very successful college career on his resume, he was taken by the Ottawa Senators in the 8th round. He then began his professional career in Ottawa's farm system leading the defense in scoring. After the season he decided to return home and played for HIFK for two years. In 1998 he helped HIFK win the league championship without losing a single game in the postseason. He capped off the year by winning a silver medal with the Finnish National Team at the World Championships.

Linna returned to North America the following year for a second attempt at reaching the NHL. He played 11 games for the Milwaukee Admirals before suffering a neck injury that ended his career.

== Career statistics ==
=== Regular season and playoffs ===
			Regular Season					Playoffs
Season	Team	League	GP	G	A	Pts	PIM	GP	G	A	Pts	PIM
1990–91	HIFK	FIN U20	1	0	0	0	0	—	—	—	—	—
1990–91	Karhu–Kissat	FIN.2	40	2	8	10	8	—	—	—	—	—
1991–92	Boston University	HE	33	7	14	21	46	—	—	—	—	—
1992–93	Boston University	HE	36	2	27	29	71	—	—	—	—	—
1993–94	Boston University	HE	34	4	13	17	26	—	—	—	—	—
1994–95	Boston University	HE	36	7	20	27	26	—	—	—	—	—
1995–96	PEI Senators	AHL	67	6	24	30	32	5	1	2	3	4
1996–97	HIFK	SM-l	46	9	12	21	79	—	—	—	—	—
1997–98	HIFK	SM-l	45	8	10	18	71	9	1	4	5	8
1998–99	Milwaukee Admirals	IHL	11	0	1	1	25	—	—	—	—	—
HE totals			139	20	74	94	169	—	—	—	—	—
SM-l totals			91	17	22	39	150	9	1	4	5	88

=== International ===
Year	Team	Event	GP	G	A	Pts	PIM
1989	Finland	EJC	6	0	0	0	4
1998	Finland	WC	10	0	0	0	10
Senior totals			10	0	0	0	10

== Awards and honors ==
Award	Year
All-Hockey East Second Team	1992–93
AHCA East Second-Team All-American	1992–93
Hockey East All-Tournament Team	1994
All-Hockey East Second Team	1994–95
AHCA East Second-Team All-American	1994–95
All-NCAA All-Tournament Team	1995
