= Bryan Schmidt =

American ice hockey player (born 1981)

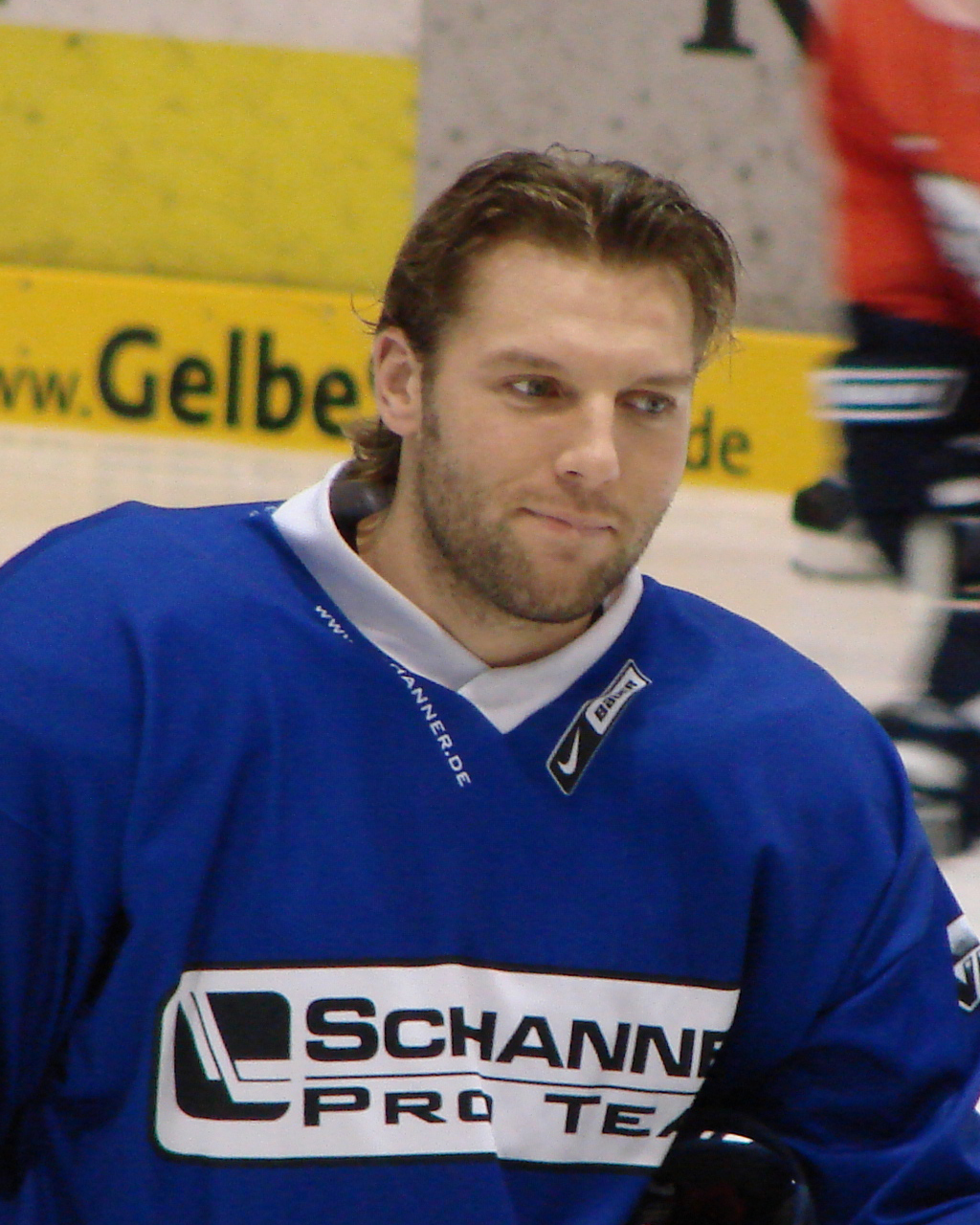
- Born: July 27, 1981 (age 44) Bloomington, Minnesota, USA
- Height: 6 ft 3 in (191 cm)
- Weight: 209 lb (95 kg; 14 st 13 lb)
- Position: Defense
- Shoots: Right
- EIHL team Former teams: Nottingham Panthers; Providence Bruins; Manchester Monarchs; Milwaukee Admirals; Kassel Huskies; EHC München; SønderjyskE; Starbulls Rosenheim; Olimpija Ljubljana; Storhamar Dragons
- NHL draft: Undrafted
- Playing career: 2006–present

Bryan Schmidt (born July 27, 1981) is an American professional ice hockey player who is currently playing for Nottingham Panthers of the EIHL.

== Awards and honors ==
| Award | Year |
|---|---|
| All-Hockey East Rookie Team | 2002–03 |
| All-Hockey East Second Team | 2004–05 |

- Regular season MVP, Merrimack College (2004–05)

== Records ==
=== Merrimack College ===
- Most goals in a single season (defense): 13 (2004–05)
- Most career goals (defense): 34 (2003–06)
- Fastest consecutive goals: 0:06 (with Steve Crusco vs. Holy Cross, 1/24/2003)

== Career statistics ==
| | | | Regular season | | | | | Playoffs |
| Season | Team | League | GP | G | A | Pts | PIM | GP | G | A | Pts | PIM |
|---|---|---|---|---|---|---|---|---|---|---|---|---|
| 1999–00 | Twin City Vulcans | USHL | 44 | 0 | 8 | 8 | 28 | 13 | 1 | 1 | 2 | 10 |
| 2000–01 | Tri-City Storm | USHL | 55 | 7 | 8 | 15 | 22 | 7 | 1 | 2 | 3 | 6 |
| 2001–02 | Tri-City Storm | USHL | 58 | 9 | 22 | 31 | 47 | — | — | — | — | — |
| 2002–03 | Merrimack College | HE | 33 | 9 | 12 | 21 | 44 | — | — | — | — | — |
| 2003–04 | Merrimack College | HE | 36 | 6 | 16 | 22 | 32 | — | — | — | — | — |
| 2004–05 | Merrimack College | HE | 36 | 13 | 18 | 31 | 56 | — | — | — | — | — |
| 2005–06 | Merrimack College | HE | 29 | 6 | 10 | 16 | 57 | — | — | — | — | — |
| 2005–06 | Providence Bruins | AHL | 15 | 2 | 2 | 4 | 13 | 1 | 0 | 0 | 0 | 0 |
| 2006–07 | Manchester Monarchs | AHL | 58 | 5 | 13 | 18 | 44 | 11 | 0 | 0 | 0 | 8 |
| 2006–07 | Reading Royals | ECHL | 6 | 2 | 1 | 3 | 6 | — | — | — | — | — |
| 2007–08 | Cincinnati Cyclones | ECHL | 14 | 3 | 10 | 13 | 21 | 16 | 4 | 7 | 11 | 20 |
| 2007–08 | Milwaukee Admirals | AHL | 44 | 4 | 4 | 8 | 32 | 6 | 0 | 1 | 1 | 2 |
| 2008–09 | Kassel Huskies | DEL | 52 | 10 | 12 | 22 | 42 | — | — | — | — | — |
| 2009–10 | Kassel Huskies | DEL | 34 | 7 | 16 | 23 | 67 | — | — | — | — | — |
| DEL totals | | | 86 | 17 | 28 | 45 | 109 | — | — | — | — | — |
