= Blair Allison =

Canadian ice hockey player

- Born: June 26, 1972 (age 54) Golden, British Columbia, Canada
- Height: 5 ft 11 in (180 cm)
- Weight: 195 lb (88 kg; 13 st 13 lb)
- Position: Goaltender
- Caught: Left
- Played for: Maine; Orlando Solar Bears; Tallahassee Tiger Sharks; Jacksonville Lizard Kings; Tacoma Sabercats; New Haven Knights; Springfield Falcons; Idaho Steelheads
- Playing career: 1993–2007

Blair Allison is a Canadian ice hockey player, former coach and goaltender who was an All-American for Maine.

== Career ==
Allison started his college career at the University of Maine in 1992 as a reserve goaltender, just in time to watch the team win its first national championship. With both starting goaltenders turning pro after the season, Allison was able to earn the job as the team's primary starter in his sophomore season. With many other players also having left, the team declined in the standings but still finished with a respectable record. Unfortunately, near the end of the regular season, Maine was forced to forfeit several games for using an ineligible player. The retroactive losses dropped the Black Bears to the bottom of the Hockey East standings and caused Maine to come up against top-seeded Boston University in the conference quarterfinals. Not surprisingly, Maine was knocked out in the first round. While the team only officially won 6 games during the year, Allison had not played a part in the violation and was allowed to keep his record of 11–8–3.

Maine was able to put the infractions in the past the next season and got off to a fantastic start. With Allison acting like a wall in the crease, Maine didn't lose until its 20th game and went on to tie for the league lead. Allison set a program record by winning 32 games and played in 51 consecutive matches when all was said and done. He was named as a first team All-American and helped the Black Bears return to the NCAA tournament. Maine received a bye into the quarterfinal round and won their opening match against 6th-seeded Denver. In the Frozen Four, they had to face the top western seed, Michigan. The two produced one of the most memorable games in NCAA history, slugging it out for over 100 minutes of playing time. Allison made 47 saves in the triple-overtime classic and allowed Dan Shermerhorn to score the winning goal in what was then the longest game in NCAA tournament history. Allison felt his team was fortunate to survive the game but they did advance to the championship game for a showdown against rival BU. Allison played well in the final game but penalties cost Maine early as BU built a 3–0 lead in the first 30 minutes. The Black Bears were able to close the gap to within 1 early in the third period but were only able to capitalize on one of eight man-advantages while BU went three for four on the power play and closed out the game with the last three goals. Despite the sour end, Allison was named as the top goaltender of the tournament.

Hopes were high for Allison's third season as he was widely viewed as one of the top goaltender in the nation and was expected to give Maine another shot at a championship. Both Allison and the team, however, took a step back in 1996 and the Black Bears finished third in the Hockey East standings. With the team on the bubble of the NCAA tournament, Allison led the Black Bears to the conference championship game where they were met by 4th-place Providence. The meeting was unfortunate as Maine could have conceivably received an at-large bid if they lost to top seeded BU; were Providence to win, however, Maine would likely be knocked out of the tournament. As it turned out, that's exactly what happened. The Friars won the title with a 3–2 victory, earning the conference's automatic bid, while the two team ahead of Maine in the standings were selected for the tournament while the Black Bears were left out.

After graduating, Allison joined the Canadian national team in the run up to the 1998 Olympic Games. While Allison had little chance to make the team since professional players were now allowed to participate, he was able to parley the opportunity into a professional career. Allison spent most of the next 9 years playing minor league hockey, mostly at the AA-level, but did produce fairly impressive records. He spent two years with the Tacoma Sabercats, backstopping the team to a championship in 1999 and a runner up finish the following year. After a year in the UHL, Allison returned to the west, this time with the Idaho Steelheads and was again a stalwart in goal. He helped the team win the Kelly Cup in 2004 after several programs were absorbed into the ECHL. Allison tried his hand at coaching the following year but didn't stay behind the bench for long. He ended his playing career with 4 games spread out over a three-year period ending in 2007.

== Statistics ==
=== Regular season and playoffs ===
			Regular season									Playoffs
Season	Team	League	GP	W	L	T	MIN	GA	SO	GAA	SV%	GP	W	L	MIN	GA	SO	GAA	SV%
1991–92	Estevan Bruins	SJHL	60	—	—	—	—	—	—	—	—	—	—	—	—	—	—	—	—
1993–94	Maine	Hockey East	28	11	8	3	1387	78	1	3.37	.878	—	—	—	—	—	—	—	—
1994–95	Maine	Hockey East	44	32	6	6	2572	115	2	2.68	.887	—	—	—	—	—	—	—	—
1995–96	Maine	Hockey East	31	19	8	4	1831	95	2	3.11	.887	—	—	—	—	—	—	—	—
1996–97	Orlando Solar Bears	IHL	1	0	1	0	41	5	0	7.38	.783	—	—	—	—	—	—	—	—
1996–97	Team Canada	International	33	22	5	2	1827	79	0	2.61	.905	—	—	—	—	—	—	—	—
1997–98	Tallahassee Tiger Sharks	ECHL	21	7	9	0	1026	65	0	3.80	.877	—	—	—	—	—	—	—	—
1997–98	Jacksonville Lizard Kings	ECHL	9	3	2	3	469	17	0	2.17	.927	—	—	—	—	—	—	—	—
1998–99	Tacoma Sabercats	WCHL	48	33	5	5	2592	115	2	2.66	.902	11	—	9	2	—	2	—	—
1999–00	Tacoma Sabercats	WCHL	43	26	7	8	2478	102	5	2.47	.909	10	—	6	4	—	2	2.19	.927
2000–01	New Haven Knights	UHL	50	19	13	6	2831	124	3	2.63	.920	7	—	—	—	—	—	—	—
2000–01	Springfield Falcons	AHL	1	0	1	0	33	3	0	5.39	.786	—	—	—	—	—	—	—	—
2001–02	Idaho Steelheads	WCHL	56	36	13	5	3143	148	2	2.83	.893	15	—	—	—	—	—	—	—
2002–03	Idaho Steelheads	WCHL	29	21	4	3	1686	64	2	2.28	.904	6	—	—	—	—	—	—	—
2003–04	Idaho Steelheads	ECHL	42	23	12	6	2500	108	1	2.59	.909	1	—	—	—	—	—	—	—
2004–05	Idaho Steelheads	ECHL	2	0	2	0	120	9	0	4.50	.850	—	—	—	—	—	—	—	—
2006–07	Idaho Steelheads	ECHL	2	1	1	0	100	5	0	3.01	.857	—	—	—	—	—	—	—	—
NCAA totals			103	62	22	13	5790	288	5	2.98	.885	—	—	—	—	—	—	—	—
WCHL totals			176	116	29	21	9899	429	11	2.60	.901	42	—	—	—	—	—	—	—
ECHL totals			76	34	26	9	4215	204	1	2.90	.900	1	—	—	—	—	—	—	—

== Awards and honors ==
Award	Year
All-Hockey East All-Star	1994–95
AHCA East First-Team All-American	1994–95
All-NCAA All-Tournament Team	1995
All-Hockey East All-Star	1995–96
