= Dan Shermerhorn =

Canadian ice hockey player

- Born: July 15, 1973 (age 51); Calgary, Alberta, Canada
- Height: 5 ft 11 in (180 cm)
- Weight: 200 lb (91 kg; 14 st 4 lb)
- Position: Centre
- Shoots: Left
- Chinook HL team Former teams: Innisfail Eagles; ECHL; Hampton Roads Admirals; Tallahassee Tiger Sharks; Baton Rouge Kingfish; WCHL; Tacoma Sabercats; Idaho Steelheads; IHL; Las Vegas Thunder; CHL; Corpus Christi Rayz; LNAH; Quebec RadioX; Thetford Mines Prolab; Thetford Mines Isothermic; Chinook HL; Carstairs Redhawks
- NHL draft: Undrafted
- Playing career: 1997–present

Dan Shermerhorn (born July 15, 1973) is a Canadian ice hockey player. He is currently playing for the Innisfail Eagles of the Chinook Hockey League (Chinook HL).

Shermerhorn attended the University of Maine where he played four seasons (1993 – 1997) of NCAA Division 1 hockey in the Hockey East conference with the Maine Black Bears. In each of his four years, Shermerhorn was named to the Hockey East All-Academic Team.

Shermerhorn began his professional career in the ECHL with the Hampton Roads Admirals, playing 12 games and the playoffs with the club late in the 1996–97 season.

== Awards and honors ==
Award	Year
All-NCAA All-Tournament Team	1995
