= Jacques Joubert =

American ice hockey player (born 1971)

- Born: March 23, 1971 (age 55) South Bend, Indiana, U.S.
- Height: 6 ft 2 in (188 cm)
- Weight: 201 lb (91 kg; 14 st 5 lb)
- Position: Center
- Shot: Right
- Played for: Princeton; North Iowa Huskies; Boston University; Peoria Rivermen; Rochester Americans; Milwaukee Admirals; EC Graz; Tallahassee Tiger Sharks; Heilbronner Falken; Esbjerg IK
- National team: United States
- NHL draft: 1993 NHL Supplemental Draft; Dallas Stars
- Playing career: 1990–2000

Jacques Joubert (born March 23, 1971) is an American former professional ice hockey center who was an All-American for Boston University.

== Career ==
Joubert's college career began at Princeton University in 1990. The year turned out poorly for him as he scored just 2 goals in 13 games and left the program in the middle of the year and return to juniors. After sitting out the following year, per NCAA transfer rules, Joubert made his debut for Boston University and was far more productive, notching 35 points and making himself enough of a commodity for the Dallas Stars to select him in the NHL Supplemental Draft.

Joubert continued his upward trend as a junior, finishing second on the Terriers in scoring and earned a spot on the second All-American team. He helped BU win both Hockey East championships and the top eastern seed at the NCAA Tournament. The Terriers won their first two games and reached the championship game. In a surprising turn of events, Boston University was overwhelmed by underdog Lake Superior State and suffered their worst championship loss since 1961.

Joubert was named team captain for his senior season and responded with his best performance yet. While he failed to make the All-American squad, he tied for the team lead in goals and led the Terriers to a second straight 30+ win season. BU tied for the regular season championship with Maine but were able to were able to capture their second consecutive Hockey East Championship. Armed with the top eastern seed yet again, BU's offense dominated in the quarter- and semifinals, propelling the Terriers to the championship once more. This time, Joubert's team had to get past Maine, a team they had failed to defeat in four games that season. Boston University managed to score the only goal in the first period and began to take over the game in the second. Joubert's final college goal came on the power play at the midway point of the game and turned out to be the game-winner. Maine cut into the Terriers lead with a pair of goals but a big third period enabled the Terriers to win the game 6–2.

After graduating, Joubert began his professional career with a good season for the Peoria Rivermen. His scoring declined in year two as he split time between two leagues. By the beginning of 1997, he found himself further away from the NHL than he wanted and ended up spending much of next three years playing in Europe. He retired in 2000.

Joubert was inducted into the Boston University athletic Hall of Fame in 2010.

== Statistics ==
=== Regular season and playoffs ===
			Regular Season					Playoffs
Season	Team	League	GP	G	A	Pts	PIM	GP	G	A	Pts	PIM
1990–91	Princeton	ECAC Hockey	13	2	0	2	6	—	—	—	—	—
1990–91	North Iowa Huskies	USHL	14	8	8	16	12	—	—	—	—	—
1992–93	Boston University	Hockey East	40	17	18	35	54	—	—	—	—	—
1993–94	Boston University	Hockey East	41	20	24	44	82	—	—	—	—	—
1994–95	Boston University	Hockey East	40	29	23	52	41	—	—	—	—	—
1995–96	Peoria Rivermen	IHL	73	17	25	42	45	12	2	5	7	2
1996–97	Milwaukee Admirals	IHL	42	7	9	16	22	—	—	—	—	—
1996–97	Rochester Americans	AHL	20	5	3	8	10	—	—	—	—	—
1997–98	Tallahassee Tiger Sharks	ECHL	22	5	7	12	26	—	—	—	—	—
1997–98	EC Graz	Austria	14	6	4	10	10	—	—	—	—	—
1998–99	Heilbronner Falken	GER 2	40	14	18	32	42	14	7	8	15	14
1999–00	Esbjerg IK	Denmark	15	6	6	12	32	—	—	—	—	—
NCAA totals			134	68	65	133	183	—	—	—	—	—
IHL totals			115	24	34	58	67	12	2	5	7	2

== Awards and honors ==
Award	Year
All-Hockey East First Team	1993–94
AHCA East Second-Team All-American	1993–94
Hockey East All-Tournament Team	1994
