= Chris O'Sullivan (ice hockey) =

American ice hockey player and scout

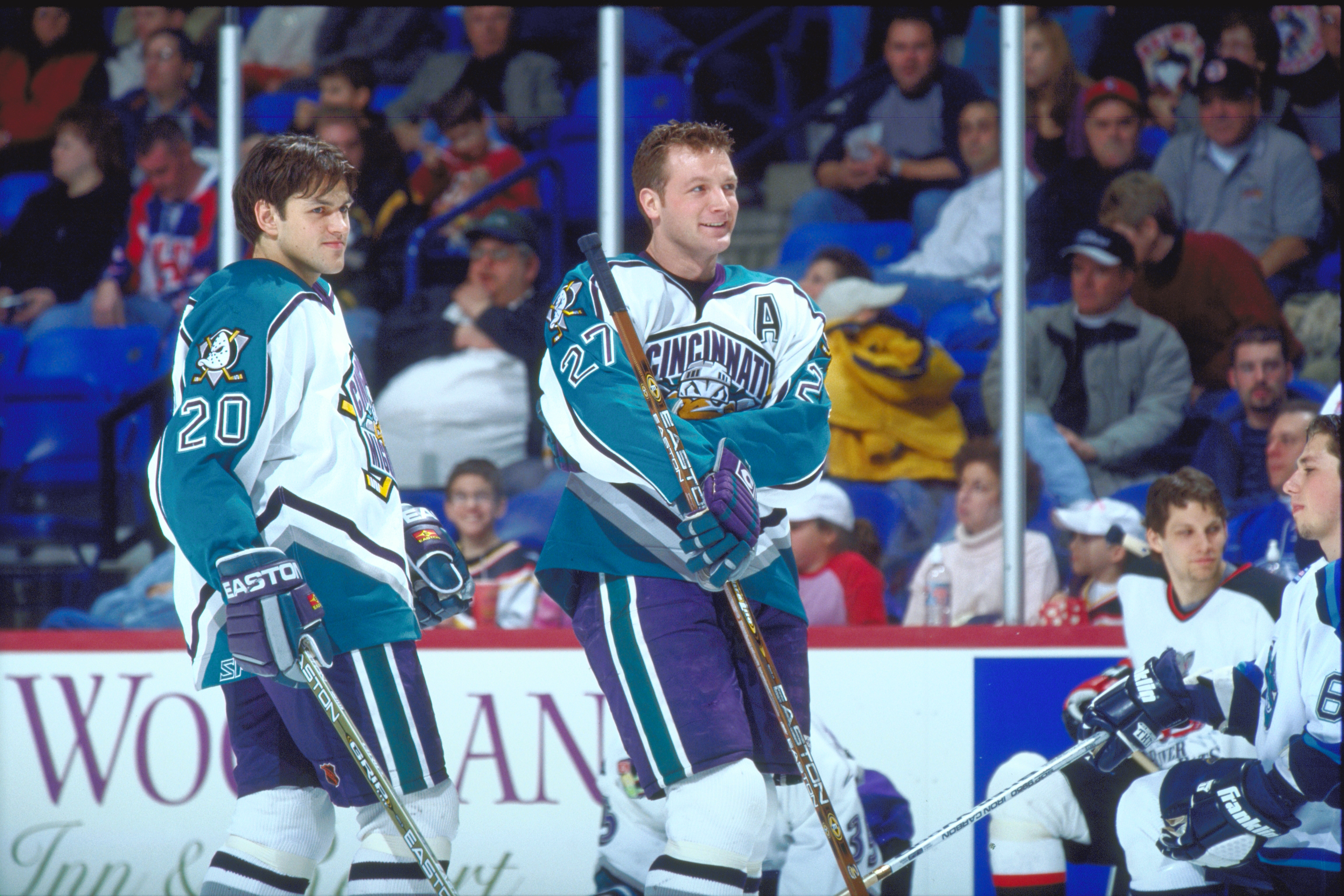
- Born: May 15, 1974 (age 51) Dorchester, Massachusetts, U.S.
- Height: 6 ft 2 in (188 cm)
- Weight: 200 lb (91 kg; 14 st 4 lb)
- Position: Defense
- Shot: Left
- Played for: Calgary Flames; Vancouver Canucks; Kloten Flyers; Mighty Ducks of Anaheim
- National team: United States
- NHL draft: 30th overall, 1992; Calgary Flames
- Playing career: 1996–2003

Chris O'Sullivan (born May 15, 1974) is an American former professional ice hockey defenseman who played in the NHL with the Calgary Flames, Vancouver Canucks, and Mighty Ducks of Anaheim. He is currently a scout for the New York Islanders, serving in the role since 2006 after three seasons scouting with the Colorado Avalanche.

== Playing career ==
As a youth, O'Sullivan played in the 1988 Quebec International Pee-Wee Hockey Tournament with The Boston Junior Bruins minor ice hockey team.

A top prospect out of high school, O'Sullivan was drafted by the Calgary Flames in the 2nd round, 30th overall in the 1992 NHL entry draft. After being drafted O'Sullivan chose to play in the college ranks and played with the Boston University Terriers for 4 years. O'Sullivan missed the majority of his freshman year (1992–1993) after suffering a neck injury during a game versus Providence College. O'Sullivan eventually recovered and became one of the top defensive players in the nation. His most successful season was during the 1994–1995 season when he led the Terriers in scoring with 56 points in 40 games and eventually leading the Terriers to a national championship in 1995, in which he was named the Most Outstanding Player.

After college O'Sullivan turned pro and split time with the Flames and their minor league affiliate Saint John Flames for the next 3 years. The 1996–1997 season would turn out to be O'Sullivan's longest stint in the NHL, playing in 27 games and scoring 10 points. Towards the end of the 1998–1999 season O'Sullivan was traded to the New York Rangers. He played 10 games with the Rangers minor league affiliate Hartford Wolf Pack before being released by the Rangers at the end of the season.

For the 1999–2000 season O'Sullivan was signed by the Vancouver Canucks. He played the majority of the season with the Syracuse Crunch while also playing 11 games with the Canucks. After the season, he was again released and picked up by the Mighty Ducks of Anaheim. He played the whole 2000–2001 season with the Cincinnati Mighty Ducks, scoring 49 points in 60 games. For the 2001–2002 season O'Sullivan played overseas in Switzerland with the Kloten Flyers.

After 1 season in Switzerland O'Sullivan returned to the Mighty Ducks for the 2002–2003 season. After only 2 games with the Mighty Ducks of Anaheim and 27 games with the Cincinnati Mighty Ducks O'Sullivan suffered another neck injury. O'Sullivan officially retired from hockey in September 2003.

== Career statistics ==
=== Regular season and playoffs ===
			Regular season					Playoffs
Season	Team	League	GP	G	A	Pts	PIM	GP	G	A	Pts	PIM
1991–92	Catholic Memorial School	HSMA	26	26	23	49	65	—	—	—	—	—
1992–93	Boston University	HE	5	0	2	2	4	—	—	—	—	—
1993–94	Boston University	HE	32	5	18	23	25	—	—	—	—	—
1994–95	Boston University	HE	40	23	33	56	48	—	—	—	—	—
1995–96	Boston University	HE	37	12	34	46	50	—	—	—	—	—
1996–97	Calgary Flames	NHL	27	2	8	10	2	—	—	—	—	—
1996–97	Saint John Flames	AHL	29	3	8	11	17	5	0	4	4	0
1997–98	Calgary Flames	NHL	12	0	2	2	10	—	—	—	—	—
1997–98	Saint John Flames	AHL	32	4	10	14	2	21	2	17	19	18
1998–99	Saint John Flames	AHL	41	7	29	36	24	—	—	—	—	—
1998–99	Calgary Flames	NHL	10	0	1	1	2	—	—	—	—	—
1998–99	Hartford Wolf Pack	AHL	10	1	4	5	0	7	1	3	4	11
1999–2000	Syracuse Crunch	AHL	59	18	47	65	24	4	0	1	1	0
1999–2000	Vancouver Canucks	NHL	11	0	5	5	2	—	—	—	—	—
2000–01	Cincinnati Mighty Ducks	AHL	60	9	40	49	31	4	0	3	3	0
2001–02	Kloten Flyers	NLA	39	7	16	23	34	6	1	2	3	12
2002–03	Cincinnati Mighty Ducks	AHL	27	2	13	15	8	—	—	—	—	—
2002–03	Mighty Ducks of Anaheim	NHL	2	0	1	1	0	—	—	—	—	—
NHL totals			62	2	17	19	16	—	—	—	—	—
AHL totals			258	44	151	195	106	41	3	28	31	29

=== International ===
Year	Team	Event	Result	GP	G	A	Pts	PIM
1994	United States	WJC	6th	7	0	3	3	4
1995	United States	WC	6th	6	0	0	0	10
2000	United States	WC	5th	7	0	1	1	0
2002	United States	WC	7th	7	0	0	0	0
Junior totals				7	0	3	3	4
Senior totals				20	0	1	1	10

== Awards and honors ==
Award	Year
College
All-Hockey East All-Star	1994–95
AHCA East Second-Team All-American	1994–95
All-NCAA All-Tournament Team	1995
AHL
All-Star Game	1999, 2000, 2001

Awards and achievements
Preceded by Sean Tallaire	NCAA Tournament Most Outstanding Player; 1995	Succeeded by Brendan Morrison
