= Shawn Bates =

American ice hockey player (born 1975)

- Born: April 3, 1975 (age 51) Medford, Massachusetts, U.S.
- Height: 6 ft 0 in (183 cm)
- Weight: 210 lb (95 kg; 15 st 0 lb)
- Position: Center
- Shot: Right
- Played for: Boston Bruins; New York Islanders; HIFK; EC KAC
- National team: United States
- NHL draft: 103rd overall, 1993; Boston Bruins
- Playing career: 1997–2010

Shawn William Bates (born April 3, 1975, in Medford, Massachusetts) is an American former professional ice hockey center. He played in the National Hockey League for the Boston Bruins and New York Islanders.

== Playing career ==
=== College ===
Bates played four seasons with the Boston University Terriers. In his four years he helped lead the team to the Frozen Four each year. Bates' teams appeared in two NCAA Finals and won the NCAA Championship in 1995, Bates was named to the All Tournament team. Overall, Bates compiled 73 goals, 71 assists, 144 points, and 190 penalty minutes in a total of 160 games.

=== NHL ===
Bates was drafted by the Boston Bruins in the 1993 NHL entry draft, 4th Round, 103rd Overall. After four years with the Bruins, he was signed as a free agent by the Islanders on July 7, 2001. Bates is remembered most for scoring on a penalty shot in Game 4 of the Islanders' Eastern Conference Quarterfinal playoff series against the Toronto Maple Leafs. Bates beat Maple Leaf goaltender Curtis Joseph top shelf to give the Islanders a 4–3 lead with 2:30 to go in regulation, and the Islanders went on to win the game and tied the series 2–2. The penalty shot was the third playoff Penalty Shot in Islander history and the first to be successful. After injuries limited Bates to two games in 2007–08, he was placed on waivers by the Islanders on June 27, 2008, and ultimately had his contract bought out.

In the 2002–03 NHL season, Bates led the NHL with six short-handed goals.

=== SM-liiga ===
In November 2008, after almost a full season without playing, Shawn Bates debuted in Finnish SM-liiga when he played for HIFK in a regular season matchup against TPS. HIFK lost the game but Bates scored one goal and 3 assists in his debut, which attracted praise from his Head Coach Kari Jalonen.

== International play ==
Bates played for Team USA in the 1995 World Juniors, recording six points (5–1–6) in seven games.

== Ceremonial ==
Threw out the ceremonial first pitch at the Championship Game of the Medford, MA Little League City Series in June 1993. The game between the Angels and Bears was eventually won by the Angels 5–4 with a walk-off home run by catcher Joe Bradanese

== Awards and honors ==
Award	Year
All-Hockey East Rookie Team	1993–94
Hockey East All-Tournament Team	1995, 1997
All-NCAA All-Tournament Team	1995

== Career statistics ==
=== Regular season and playoffs ===
			Regular season					Playoffs
Season	Team	League	GP	G	A	Pts	PIM	GP	G	A	Pts	PIM
1990–91	Medford High School	HS-MA	22	18	43	61	6	—	—	—	—	—
1991–92	Medford High School	HS-MA	22	38	41	79	10	—	—	—	—	—
1992–93	Medford High School	HS-MA	25	49	46	95	20	—	—	—	—	—
1993–94	Boston University	HE	41	10	19	29	24	—	—	—	—	—
1994–95	Boston University	HE	38	18	12	30	48	—	—	—	—	—
1995–96	Boston University	HE	40	28	22	50	54	—	—	—	—	—
1996–97	Boston University	HE	41	17	18	35	64	—	—	—	—	—
1997–98	Boston Bruins	NHL	13	2	0	2	2	—	—	—	—	—
1997–98	Providence Bruins	AHL	50	15	19	34	22	—	—	—	—	—
1998–99	Boston Bruins	NHL	33	5	4	9	2	12	0	0	0	4
1998–99	Providence Bruins	AHL	37	25	21	46	39	—	—	—	—	—
1999–2000	Boston Bruins	NHL	44	5	7	12	14	—	—	—	—	—
2000–01	Boston Bruins	NHL	45	2	3	5	26	—	—	—	—	—
2000–01	Providence Bruins	AHL	11	5	8	13	12	8	2	6	8	8
2001–02	New York Islanders	NHL	71	17	35	52	30	7	2	4	6	11
2002–03	New York Islanders	NHL	74	13	29	42	52	5	1	0	1	0
2003–04	New York Islanders	NHL	69	9	23	32	46	5	0	0	0	4
2005–06	New York Islanders	NHL	66	15	19	34	60	—	—	—	—	—
2006–07	New York Islanders	NHL	48	4	6	10	34	—	—	—	—	—
2007–08	New York Islanders	NHL	2	0	0	0	0	—	—	—	—	—
2007–08	Bridgeport Sound Tigers	AHL	3	2	0	2	6	—	—	—	—	—
2008–09	HIFK	SM-l	20	5	16	21	20	—	—	—	—	—
2009–10	EC KAC	AUT	6	0	3	3	12	—	—	—	—	—
2009–10	Manchester Monarchs	AHL	10	0	1	1	8	—	—	—	—	—
NHL totals			465	72	126	198	266	29	3	4	7	19

=== International ===
Year	Team	Event	GP	G	A	Pts	PIM
1995	United States	WJC	7	5	1	6	2
