= Jon Coleman =

American ice hockey player (born 1975)

- Born: March 9, 1975 (age 51) Boston, Massachusetts, U.S.
- Height: 6 ft 1 in (185 cm)
- Weight: 198 lb (90 kg; 14 st 2 lb)
- Position: Defense
- Shot: Right
- Played for: AHL; Adirondack Red Wings; Kentucky Thoroughblades; Providence Bruins; Worcester IceCats
- NHL draft: 48th overall, 1993; Detroit Red Wings
- Playing career: 1997–2012
- Coaching career

Current position
- Title: Assistant coach
- Team: Bentley
- Conference: Atlantic Hockey

Biographical details
- Education: Boston University

Coaching career (HC unless noted)
- 2015–2018: Babson (assistant)
- 2018–Present: Bentley (assistant)

Jonathon Coleman (born March 9, 1975) is an American former professional ice hockey player. He ended his career playing for HC Eppan-Appiano of the Italian Serie B.

He was selected by the Detroit Red Wings in the 2nd round (48th overall) of the 1993 NHL entry draft.

Prior to turning professional, Coleman attended Boston University, where he played four seasons of college hockey with the NCAA Division I Boston University Terriers men's ice hockey team.

== Career statistics ==
			Regular season					Playoffs
Season	Team	League	GP	G	A	Pts	PIM	GP	G	A	Pts	PIM
1993–94	Boston University	NCAA	29	1	14	15	26	—	—	—	—	—
1994–95	Boston University	NCAA	40	5	23	28	42	—	—	—	—	—
1995–96	Boston University	NCAA	40	7	31	38	58	—	—	—	—	—
1996–97	Boston University	NCAA	39	5	27	32	20	—	—	—	—	—
1997–98	Adirondack Red Wings	AHL	54	2	29	31	23	2	0	0	0	0
1997–98	Detroit Vipers	IHL	1	0	0	0	0	—	—	—	—	—
1998–99	Adirondack Red Wings	AHL	72	12	26	38	32	3	0	0	0	0
1999–00	Kentucky Thoroughblades	AHL	66	1	14	15	43	9	2	4	6	2
2000–01	Orlando Solar Bears	IHL	19	1	7	8	6	12	0	1	1	2
2000–01	Providence Bruins	AHL	49	4	15	19	14	—	—	—	—	—
2001–02	Amur Khabarovsk	Russia	44	0	5	5	40	—	—	—	—	—
2002–03	Vienna Capitals	Austria	42	7	12	19	14	—	—	—	—	—
2003–04	Worcester IceCats	AHL	57	2	22	24	6	7	1	3	4	2
2004–05	HC Ambri-Piotta	NLA	2	0	0	0	0	—	—	—	—	—
2004–05	Kölner Haie	DEL	36	1	4	5	56	7	0	0	0	10
2005–06	Malmö Redhawks	Allsvenskan	33	3	5	8	47	7	0	3	3	6
2006–07	HC Bolzano	Italy	32	1	14	15	22	5	0	1	1	4
2007–08	Graz 99ers	Austria	38	3	9	12	47	—	—	—	—	—
2007–08	Nottingham Panthers	EIHL	16	3	5	8	10	2	1	0	1	2
2008–09	Coventry Blaze	EIHL	11	1	3	4	36	—	—	—	—	—
2009–10	Eppan/Appiano	Italy 2	34	3	36	39	32	13	3	8	11	4
2010–11	Eppan/Appiano	Italy 2	32	8	27	35	22	5	1	3	4	2
2011–12	Eppan-Appiano	Italy 2	41	7	32	39	30	10	0	5	5	8
AHL totals			298	21	106	127	118	21	3	7	10	4

== Awards and honors ==
Award	Year
Hockey East All-Tournament Team	1995
All-Hockey East All-Star	1995–96
AHCA East Second-Team All-American	1995–96
All-Hockey East All-Star	1996–97
AHCA East First-Team All-American	1996–97
