= 1995 Hockey East men's ice hockey tournament =

1995 Hockey East Men's ice hockey tournament
- Dates: March 7–18, 1995
- Teams: 9
- Finals site: Boston Garden; Boston, Massachusetts
- Champions: Boston University (4th title)
- Winning coach: Jack Parker (4th title)
- MVP: Bob Bell (Providence)
- Hockey East Men's Ice Hockey Tournaments

The 1995 Hockey East Men's Ice Hockey Tournament was the 11th tournament in the history of the conference. It was played between March 7 and March 18, 1995. Play-in and quarterfinal games were played at home team campus sites, while the final four games were, for the final time, played at the Boston Garden in Boston, Massachusetts, the home venue of the NHL's Boston Bruins. By winning the tournament, Boston University received the Hockey East's automatic bid to the 1995 NCAA Division I Men's Ice Hockey Tournament.

== Format ==
The tournament featured three rounds of play with an additional play-in game with each round being a single-elimination game. The teams that finish eighth and ninth in the conference play a single play-in game to determine the final qualifier to the tournament. In the first round, the first seed and play-in victor, the second and seventh seeds, the third seed and sixth seeds, and the fourth seed and fifth seeds played with the winners advancing to the semifinals. In the semifinals, the highest and lowest seeds and second highest and second lowest seeds play with the winners advancing to the championship game and the losers meeting in a consolation game. The tournament champion receives an automatic bid to the 1995 NCAA Division I Men's Ice Hockey Tournament.

== Conference standings ==
Note: GP = Games played; W = Wins; L = Losses; T = Ties; SW = Shootout Wins; PTS = Points; GF = Goals For; GA = Goals Against

1994–95 Hockey East standings
	Conference								Overall					
	GP	W	L	T	SW	PTS	GF	GA	GP	W	L	T	GF	GA
Maine†	24	15	3	6	1	88	104	63	44	32	6	6	196	118
Boston University†*	24	16	5	3	2	88	131	82	40	31	6	3	224	117
New Hampshire	24	14	6	4	0	78	113	85	36	22	10	4	161	123
Northeastern	24	11	8	5	5	70	98	89	35	16	14	5	143	137
Massachusetts–Lowell	24	11	12	1	1	58	105	116	41	17	19	4	165	175
Providence	24	7	11	6	3	50	102	103	37	14	17	6	158	159
Merrimack	24	7	12	5	3	48	74	91	37	14	18	5	125	137
Boston College	24	8	14	2	1	45	86	119	35	11	22	2	129	169
Massachusetts	24	3	21	0	0	15	64	129	36	6	28	2	92	173
Championship: Boston University † indicates conference regular season champion * indicates conference tournament champion

== Bracket ==
Teams are reseeded after the quarterfinals

Play-In; March 7
8	Boston College	4
9	Massachusetts	5

Quarterfinals; March 9–12
1	Maine	7
9	Massachusetts	4
2	Boston University	4
7	Merrimack	3
3	New Hampshire	2
6	Providence	3*
4	Northeastern	2
5	Massachusetts-Lowell	5

Semifinals; March 17
1	Maine	3
6	Providence	7
2	Boston University	4
5	Massachusetts-Lowell	2

Championship; March 18
2	Boston University	3
6	Providence	2
Consolation
1	Maine	6
5	Massachusetts-Lowell	0

Note: * denotes overtime period(s)

=== Play-in ===
==== (8) Boston College vs. (9) Massachusetts ====
March 7	Boston College	4 – 5	Massachusetts	Conte Forum

=== Quarterfinals ===
==== (1) Maine vs. (9) Massachusetts ====
March 11	Maine	7 – 4	Massachusetts	Alfond Arena

==== (2) Boston University vs. (7) Merrimack ====
March 12	Boston University	4 – 3	Merrimack	Walter Brown Arena

==== (3) New Hampshire vs. (6) Providence ====
March 9	New Hampshire	2 – 3	Providence	JFK Coliseum

==== (4) Northeastern vs. (5) Massachusetts-Lowell ====
March 10	Northeastern	2 – 5	Massachusetts-Lowell	Matthews Arena

=== Semifinals ===
==== (1) Maine vs. (6) Providence ====
March 17	Maine	3 – 7	Providence	Boston Garden

==== (2) Boston University vs. (5) Massachusetts-Lowell ====
March 17	Boston University	4 – 2	Massachusetts-Lowell	Boston Garden

=== Consolation ===
==== (1) Maine vs. (5) Massachusetts-Lowell ====
March 18	Maine	6 – 0	Massachusetts-Lowell	Boston Garden

=== Championship ===
==== (2) Boston University vs. (6) Providence ====
March 18	Boston University	3 – 2	Providence	Boston Garden

== Tournament awards ==
=== All-Tournament Team ===
- F Shawn Bates (Boston University)
- F Brady Kramer (Providence)
- F Chad Quenneville (Providence)
- D Jon Coleman (Boston University)
- D Chris Imes (Maine)
- G Bob Bell* (Providence)

* Tournament MVP(s)
