= Michael Sylvia =

American politician

Member of the New Hampshire House of Representatives
- In office December 5, 2012 – December 7, 2022
- Constituency: Belknap 6

Personal details
- Party: Republican
- Website: mikesylvia.org

Michael "Mike" Sylvia is an American politician from New Hampshire. He served in the New Hampshire House of Representatives.
