= Tim Murray (ice hockey player) =

Canadian ice hockey player

- Born: November 14, 1974 (age 51) Calgary, Alberta, Canada
- Height: 6 ft 2 in (188 cm)
- Weight: 194 lb (88 kg; 13 st 12 lb)
- Position: Defence
- Shot: Left
- Played for: IHL; Detroit Vipers; AHL; Rochester Americans; Adirondack Red Wings; Portland Pirates; BISL; London Knights
- NHL draft: Undrafted
- Playing career: 1997–2000

Tim Murray (born November 14, 1974) is a Canadian former professional ice hockey defenceman.

== Career ==
Murray attended the University of New Hampshire where he played four seasons (1993–1997) of NCAA Division I men's ice hockey with the New Hampshire Wildcats of the Hockey East conference. He was recognized for his outstanding play when in his freshman year he was named to the 1993–94 Hockey East All-Rookie Team, and in his senior year was awarded with the Roger A. Leclerc Trophy as the team's MVP and named to the NCAA East All-American Second Team.

Immediately after graduation in 1997, Murray began his professional career with the Detroit Vipers of the International Hockey League (IHL). He went on to play three years of professional hockey, retiring after the 1999–2000 season having played 78 games in the IHL, 61 games in the American Hockey League, and 40 regular season games in the British Ice Hockey Superleague with the London Knights.

== Career statistics ==
=== Regular Season and Playoffs ===
			Regular season					Playoffs
Season	Team	League	GP	G	A	Pts	PIM	GP	G	A	Pts	PIM
1993–94	New Hampshire Wildcats	HE	40	3	5	8	18	—	—	—	—	—
1994–95	New Hampshire Wildcats	HE	33	0	6	6	14	—	—	—	—	—
1995–96	New Hampshire Wildcats	HE	34	4	16	20	28	—	—	—	—	—
1996–97	New Hampshire Wildcats	HE	37	0	37	37	40	—	—	—	—	—
	Detroit Vipers	IHL	5	0	4	4	2	—	—	—	—	—
1997-98	Detroit Vipers	IHL	34	2	17	19	22	—	—	—	—	—
	Rochester Americans	AHL	26	3	13	16	18	—	—	—	—	—
	Adirondack Red Wings	AHL	7	1	6	7	6	3	0	1	1	0
1998-99	Portland Pirates	AHL	28	1	9	10	14	—	—	—	—	—
	Detroit Vipers	IHL	39	1	8	9	17	—	—	—	—	—
1999-00	London Knights	BISL	40	1	10	11	26	8	0	3	3	2

== Awards and honours ==
Award	Year
Hockey East All-Rookie Team	1993–94
NCAA East All-American Second Team	1996–97
AHCA All-American Second Team	1996–97
