= Steve Thornton =

British ice hockey player (born 1973)

- Born: 8 March 1973 (age 53) Gloucester, Ontario, Canada
- Height: 5 ft 10 in (178 cm)
- Weight: 185 lb (84 kg; 13 st 3 lb)
- Position: Centre
- Shot: Left
- Played for: Cardiff Devils; London Knights; Basingstoke Bison; Belfast Giants
- National team: Great Britain
- Playing career: 1995–2010

Steve Thornton (born 8 March 1973) is a Canadian-born British former professional ice hockey player. He is currently the director of hockey operations for the Belfast Giants of the Elite Ice Hockey League.

== Career ==
Thornton was born in Edmonton, Alberta, but moved to Gloucester, Ontario when he was 7. Apart from playing junior hockey with the Gloucester Rangers, college hockey with Boston University and one season in the International Hockey League with the Peoria Rivermen, Thornton's career has been played in Europe. He has single season spells in Austria with Klagenfurt and in Germany's Deutsche Eishockey Liga with the Adler Mannheim before moving to the United Kingdom, spending five seasons with the Cardiff Devils. He also had spells with the London Knights and the Belfast Giants, where he won the playoff cup in 2003. He then moved to Italy, spending two seasons with Val Pusteria Wolves, and then had spells in Switzerland and Sweden before returning to Britain, joining the Basingstoke Bison.

== Coaching career ==
On 7 April 2008 Thornton was confirmed as the new player/coach of the Belfast Giants, replacing Ed Courtenay, and in two seasons in charge, he guided the Giants to three trophies. He departed in 2010 and was replaced by Doug Christiansen.

On Monday 28 April 2014, Thornton returned as coach of the Belfast Giants, under taking the wider role of head of hockey operations upon the departure of Belfast Giants general manager, Todd Kelman.

== Personal ==
Thornton has acquired British citizenship.

Thornton was formerly a real estate agent with Paul Rushforth Real Estate in Ottawa, Ontario.

Awards and achievements
Preceded by Michael Spalla	Len Ceglarski Sportsmanship Award; 1994–95	Succeeded by Todd Hall
