= Jeff Tory =

Canadian ice hockey defenceman (born 1973)

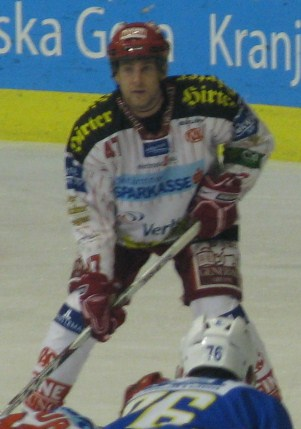
- Born: May 9, 1973 (age 52); Burnaby, British Columbia, Canada
- Height: 5 ft 10 in (178 cm)
- Weight: 194 lb (88 kg; 13 st 12 lb)
- Position: Defenceman
- Shoots: Right
- EBHL team: HDD Olimpija Ljubljana
- NHL draft: Undrafted
- Playing career: 1997–present

Jeff "Iron Fist" Tory (born August 6, 1973) is a Canadian ice hockey defenceman who played in minor leagues in North America, as well as teams in Germany and Austria. He was born and raised in Burnaby, British Columbia.

After spending three years at the University of Maine, Tory played for the Canadian National Team as well three games for the Kentucky Thoroughblades before signing with the Houston Aeros in 1997. After two seasons he moved to the Philadelphia Phantoms for one season. He then played ten games for the Utah Grizzlies before returning to the Aeros.

In 2001, Tory moved to the European leagues, signing with the Kassel Huskies of the Deutsche Eishockey Liga for one season. He then spent one season with the Hamburg Freezers before spending three seasons with the DEG Metro Stars between 2003 and 2006. He spent one more season in the DEL with ERC Ingolstadt before moving to Austria in 2007, signing for KAC in Klagenfurt.

== Career statistics ==
			Regular season					Playoffs
Season	Team	League	GP	G	A	Pts	PIM	GP	G	A	Pts	PIM
1990–91	Penticton Panthers	BCJHL	48	8	25	33	59	—	—	—	—	—
1992–93	Penticton Panthers	BCJHL	50	22	69	91	44	—	—	—	—	—
1993–94	University of Maine	NCAA	3	0	0	0	4	—	—	—	—	—
1994–95	University of Maine	NCAA	40	13	42	55	22	—	—	—	—	—
1995–96	University of Maine	NCAA	38	4	37	41	36	—	—	—	—	—
1996–97	Kentucky Thoroughblades	AHL	3	0	2	2	2	4	0	0	0	2
1997–98	Houston Aeros	IHL	74	11	27	38	35	4	0	1	1	2
1998–99	Houston Aeros	IHL	79	19	36	55	46	18	2	6	8	8
1999–00	Philadelphia Phantoms	AHL	76	17	41	58	44	5	1	3	4	4
2000–01	Utah Grizzlies	IHL	10	1	3	4	7	—	—	—	—	—
2000–01	Houston Aeros	IHL	70	12	23	35	24	7	1	4	5	2
2001–02	Kassel Huskies	DEL	59	10	28	38	24	7	0	3	3	16
2002–03	Hamburg Freezers	DEL	52	13	33	46	46	5	0	0	0	2
2003–04	DEG Metro Stars	DEL	51	12	34	46	58	4	1	0	1	4
2004–05	DEG Metro Stars	DEL	50	10	20	30	73	—	—	—	—	—
2005–06	DEG Metro Stars	DEL	52	14	32	46	30	14	1	9	10	10
2006–07	ERC Ingolstadt	DEL	51	12	31	43	26	6	2	3	5	4
2007–08	Klagenfurter AC	EBEL	46	6	39	45	24	3	0	1	1	0
2008–09	Klagenfurter AC	EBEL	51	9	42	51	30	17	3	12	15	24
2009–10	Klagenfurter AC	EBEL	53	13	36	49	28	7	1	5	6	4
2010–11	Klagenfurter AC	EBEL	33	0	19	19	16	1	0	0	0	2
2011–12	Eispiraten Crimmitschau	Germany2	45	5	17	22	14	6	0	1	1	8
AHL totals			79	17	43	60	46	9	1	3	4	6
DEL totals			315	71	178	249	257	36	4	15	19	36

== Awards and honours ==
Award	Year
All-Hockey East Rookie Team	1994–95
All-Hockey East All-Star	1994–95
AHCA East Second-Team All-American	1994–95
All-Hockey East All-Star	1995–96
AHCA East First-Team All-American	1995–96
Hockey East All-Tournament Team	1996
