= Tim Lovell =

American ice hockey player (born 2002)

- Born: February 8, 2002 (age 24) Bad Nauheim, Germany
- Height: 5 ft 9 in (175 cm)
- Weight: 165 lb (75 kg; 11 st 11 lb)
- Position: Defense
- Shoots: Left
- KHL team Former teams: Neftekhimik Nizhnekamsk; Jukurit
- NHL draft: Undrafted
- Playing career: 2025–present

Timothy Lovell (born February 8, 2002) is an American professional ice hockey player. He is currently under contract with HC Neftekhimik Nizhnekamsk of the Kontinental Hockey League (KHL). He played college ice hockey for Boston College, Arizona State and Michigan.

== Early life ==
Lovell was born to Tim and Anne Lovell in Bad Nauheim, Germany while his father was playing ice hockey for Rote Teufel Bad Nauheim. His father played college ice hockey at Maine and UMass. He has two younger sisters, Lillian and Annabelle, and a younger brother, George.

After his father retired from ice hockey, they moved to Hingham, Massachusetts where he founded Lovell Hockey. He played ice hockey for the Boston Advantage midget program, where he was coached by his father.

== Playing career ==
=== Junior ===
Lovell began the 2019–20 season, with the Chicago Steel where recorded one assist in four games. On November 29, 2019, he was traded to the Des Moines Buccaneers. He finished the season scoring five goals and 11 assists in 27 games with the Buccaneers. Following the season he was named to the USHL All-Rookie Second Team.

=== College ===
In December 2018, Lovell committed to play college ice hockey at Ohio State. In November 2019, he de-committed from Ohio State, and committed to Boston College. His great-grandfathers, both grandparents on his mother's side, and five aunts and uncles all attended Boston College. During the 2020–21 season in his freshman year he recorded two assists in 18 games.

Following his freshman year at Boston College, Lovell transferred to Arizona State. During the 2020–21 season, in his sophomore year, he recorded four goals and 18 assists in 34 games. He led all defenseman on the team in points and assists. He scored his first career goal during the opening game of the season on October 2, 2021, in a game against UMass Lowell. During the 2022–23 season, in his junior year, he recorded three goals and 15 assists in 31 games. During the 2023–24 season, in his senior year, he recorded five goals and 32 assists in 36 games, to lead all defenseman on the team in points. He was subsequently named a Hobey Baker Award nominee. With 37 points, he tied Brinson Pasichnuk for a single-season program record of points by a defenseman. He also ranked first in single-season assists by a defenseman (32), second in career points by a defenseman (77) and second in career assists by a defenseman (65) in Arizona State program history.

On March 28, 2024, Lovell entered the NCAA transfer portal. He finished his career at Arizona State with 12 goals and 65 assists for 101 games. On April 17, 2024, he transferred to Michigan for his final year of eligibility. On November 29, 2024, it was announced Lovell left the University of Michigan. During the 2024–25 season, he recorded two assists in ten games, both against his former team, Arizona State.

=== Professional ===
Lovell joined his sister, Annabelle, as she represented the United States at the 2025 IIHF U18 Women's World Championship in Finland. On January 7, 2025, he signed a one-week trial contract with Mikkelin Jukurit of the Liiga. On January 12, 2025, he signed a contract extension for the remainder of the 2024–25 season. On January 29, 2025, Jukurit and Lovell mutually agreed to terminate his contract. Prior to his termination, he recorded one goal and one assist in six games for Jukurit.

After a lone season returning to North America with the Greenville Swamp Rabbits of the ECHL, Lovell returned abroad after securing a one-year deal with Russian club, HC Neftekhimik Nizhnekamsk of the KHL, on July 6, 2026.

== Career statistics ==
			Regular season					Playoffs
Season	Team	League	GP	G	A	Pts	PIM	GP	G	A	Pts	PIM
2019–20	Chicago Steel	USHL	4	0	1	1	2	—	—	—	—	—
2019–20	Des Moines Buccaneers	USHL	27	5	11	16	12	—	—	—	—	—
2020–21	Boston College	HE	18	0	2	2	6	—	—	—	—	—
2021–22	Arizona State	Independent	34	4	18	22	28	—	—	—	—	—
2022–23	Arizona State	Independent	31	3	15	18	41	—	—	—	—	—
2023–24	Arizona State	Independent	36	5	32	37	48	—	—	—	—	—
2024–25	University of Michigan	B1G	10	0	2	2	8	—	—	—	—	—
2024–25	Jukurit	Liiga	6	1	1	2	6	—	—	—	—	—
2025–26	Greenville Swamp Rabbits	ECHL	72	6	26	32	45	—	—	—	—	—
Liiga totals			6	1	1	2	6	—	—	—	—	—
