= Brandon Holt (ice hockey) =

American ice hockey player (born 2001)

- Born: April 30, 2001 (age 25) Grand Forks, North Dakota, U.S.
- Height: 5 ft 11 in (180 cm)
- Weight: 181 lb (82 kg; 12 st 13 lb)
- Position: Defense
- Shoots: Right
- AHL team: Tucson Roadrunners
- Playing career: 2026–present

Brandon Holt (born April 30, 2001) is an American professional ice hockey defenseman for the Tucson Roadrunners of the American Hockey League (AHL). He played college ice hockey at Maine.

== Playing career ==
=== Junior ===
Holt played three seasons with the New Mexico Ice Wolves of the North American Hockey League (NAHL) and recorded 21 goals and 50 assists in 160 games.

=== College ===
Holt began his college ice hockey at Maine during the 2022–23 season. In his freshman year, he recorded four goals and seven assists in 24 games, and missed the final 12 games of the season due to injury. During the 2023–24 season, in his sophomore year, he recorded four goals and 11 assists in 33 games. During the 2024–25 season, in his junior year, he recorded four goals and 16 assists in 34 games. In October 2024, he led all Hockey East defensemen in scoring with two goals and five assists, and was named the Hockey East Defender of the Month. Following the season, he was named to the Hockey East Third All-Star Team.

On September 26, 2025, he was named a captain for the 2025–26 season. During his senior year, he recorded a career-high six goals, 26 assists and 47 blocked shots in 35 games. During conference play, he averaged 23:04 minutes per game and recorded 33 blocked shots in 24 games. He also led the entire league in assists with 18, and he was third in total points with 23. Following the season he was named to the Hockey East First All-Star Team and Hockey East Best Defensive Defenseman. He became the third Black Bear to win the award, and the first since Prestin Ryan in 2004. He was also named an AHCA East First Team All-American. He finished his collegiate career with 18 goals and 60 assists in 126 games. He became the only Hockey East defenseman over the last 20 seasons to record 75 or more career points while also recording 40 or fewer career penalty minutes.

=== Professional ===
On April 2, 2026, Holt signed a one-year contract with the Tucson Roadrunners beginning during the 2026–27 season. He joined the Roadrunners on an professional tryout (PTO) contract for the remainder of the 2025–26 season.

== Career statistics ==
			Regular season					Playoffs
Season	Team	League	GP	G	A	Pts	PIM	GP	G	A	Pts	PIM
2019–20	New Mexico Ice Wolves	NAHL	50	2	12	14	14	—	—	—	—	—
2020–21	New Mexico Ice Wolves	NAHL	53	6	16	22	12	—	—	—	—	—
2021–22	New Mexico Ice Wolves	NAHL	57	13	22	35	16	13	1	3	4	6
2022–23	University of Maine	HE	24	4	7	11	2	—	—	—	—	—
2023–24	University of Maine	HE	33	4	11	15	18	—	—	—	—	—
2024–25	University of Maine	HE	34	4	16	20	12	—	—	—	—	—
2025–26	University of Maine	HE	35	6	26	32	8	—	—	—	—	—
2025–26	Tucson Roadrunners	AHL	5	1	1	2	0	—	—	—	—	—
AHL totals			5	1	1	2	0	—	—	—	—	—

== Awards and honors ==
Award	Year	Ref
College
All-Hockey East Third Team	2025	
All-Hockey East First Team	2026	
Hockey East Best Defensive Defenseman	2026	
AHCA East First Team All-American	2026	

Awards and achievements
Preceded by Eamon Powell	Hockey East Best Defensive Defenseman; 2025–26	Succeeded by Incumbent
