= Maine Black Bears men's ice hockey =

College ice hockey program

- Current season
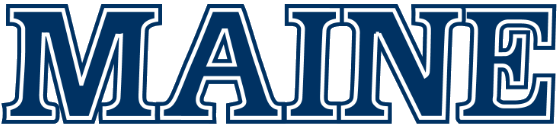
- University: University of Maine
- Conference: Hockey East
- Head coach: Ben Barr; 5th season, 69–58–17 (.538)
- Assistant coaches: Alfie Michaud; Jason Fortier; Eric Soltys
- Arena: Harold Alfond Sports Arena; Orono, Maine
- Colors: Maine blue, white, and navy
- Fight song: The Maine Stein Song / For Maine!
- Mascot: Bananas T. Bear

NCAA tournament champions
- 1993, 1999

NCAA tournament runner-up
- 1995, 2002, 2004

NCAA tournament Frozen Four
- 1988, 1989, 1991, 1993, 1995, 1999, 2000, 2002, 2004, 2006, 2007

NCAA tournament appearances
- 1987, 1988, 1989, 1990, 1991, 1993, 1995, 1999, 2000, 2001, 2002, 2003, 2004, 2005, 2006, 2007, 2012, 2024, 2025

Conference tournament champions
- Hockey East: 1989, 1992, 1993, 2000, 2004, 2025

Conference regular season champions
- Hockey East: 1988, 1993, 1995

Current uniform

The Maine Black Bears men's ice hockey is an (NCAA) Division I college ice hockey program that represents the University of Maine. The Black Bears are a member of Hockey East. Home games are played at Harold Alfond Sports Arena commonly known as Alfond Arena in Orono, Maine.

The Black Bears have appeared in 11 Frozen Fours, have a 29-21 record in NCAA Tournament games, and have won two national championships—in 1993 and 1999.

== Program history ==
=== Birth of Maine ice hockey (1977–84) ===
The University of Maine, then known as the University of Maine at Orono, officially developed an NCAA-sanctioned men's ice hockey program in 1977. The program and arena construction happened at the same time.

This was not, however, the first attempt at birthing a permanent hockey program in Orono. Maine played in 17 games of college hockey in 1922 and 1923. They played other Maine colleges such as Bowdoin, Colby, and Bates. This program did not stick, and it would be over 5 decades before organized hockey would become a staple at the state's flagship university.

Upon its foundation in 1977, the program was coached by Jack Semler (University of Vermont '68). Maine enjoyed modest success under Semler boasting winning records in 3 of their first 4 regular seasons. The Black Bears competed in The Eastern College Athletic Conference (ECAC) during their first 7 years of existence, all of which were under Semler. The ECAC was recognized as Division-II hockey until 1979 at which point the conference, and thus Maine, became Division-I – the level of competition they have competed in ever since.

=== Shawn Walsh era (1984–2001) ===
Following the 1983–84 season, head coach Jack Semler submitted their resignation.[1] With Maine set to join the newly formed Hockey East Association, Maine hired Shawn Walsh, a 29-year-old assistant at Colorado State University and ex-3rd string goalie at Bowling Green State University. Walsh was assistant coach for Ron Mason at Michigan State and Alma Mater. In only half a decade, the Spartans went from being sub-.500 performers to national contenders.

They inherited a struggling team, so win/loss improvement was not immediate; Maine posted a 23–57–2 record over Walsh's first two years with the program. However, Walsh was getting good recruits and convincing the school, state, and fans that UMaine could become a college hockey powerhouse. In 1986, Walsh and the program saw the first of many significant accomplishments. At 24–16–2, he posted his first winning season as a head coach. The team also made its first NCAA tournament appearance that season, coincidentally losing in the first round to Michigan State.

After finishing as the conference runner up in '87 and '88, Maine brought home its first significant championship in the 1988–89 season. Walsh's Black Bears skated past Boston College in a 5–4 win for their first of 6 HEA Championships. Four of these would come under Walsh. Due to the success and popularity of the program, Alfond Arena expanded its capacity from 3,800 to more than 5,000 in 1992.

==== 1993 National Championship ====
Maine was a heavy favorite to win its first national championship during the '91–'92 season. Unfortunately, those hopes were dashed when they suffered a surprise first-round loss to Michigan State. The team lost many important players, including Hobey Baker Award winner Scott Pellerin, after the season. People expected the team to underperform entering '92–'93.

However, the Black Bears' freshman class of 1992 was stronger than expected. Its lineup included future NHL Star Paul Kariya, and renowned identical twin forwards Peter and Chris Ferraro, along with Jim Montgomery, "Little" Cal Ingraham, Chris Imes, Garth Snow and Mike Dunham.

Kariya scored 100 points in one season at school, while Montgomery finished his successful college years with 301 points. They had a 42–1–2 season record, won the HEA regular season title, and won the HEA conference championship. They also won their first national championship.

Their destiny was almost blown during the Frozen Four semifinals against the University of Michigan when the referees disallowed an otherwise legitimate Maine goal. The backside of the net was raised when the puck slid in causing confusion as to if it really went in. As a result, the game was tied at the end of regulation when Maine felt they should have won. In overtime, Lee Saunders scored the game-winner and sent Maine to the title game against defending champ Lake Superior State University.

Maine's near-perfect season found itself in jeopardy once again in the championship game. Despite an early and promising 2–0 lead, the Bears found themselves trailing the seasoned Lakers 4–2 after two periods. Working double shifts for period number three, two likely heroes emerged. Jim Montgomery scored a natural hat-trick in the third period, lifting Maine to a 5–4 win. Kariya assisted on all three goals.

There was a crackdown on many big college hockey programs during the 1990s for playing athletes who were deemed ineligible. Maine was one of these teams, and they suffered consequences including forfeited losses both retroactively and in future seasons. Some people questioned whether the 1993 title was real. But the NCAA let it go because the players were from past seasons and didn't play in Maine's championship.

==== 1999 National Championship ====
The middle years of the 1990s were bittersweet for the Black Bears. They enjoyed some on-ice success and finished the national runner up in 1995, but due to sanctions and penalties for reasons previously mentioned, they were unable to compete in the NCAA tournament in 1996 and '97.

The 1998–1999 season crowned a much-less-likely champion than that of 1993. Maine did not win the regular season crown, nor did they even land in their own conference tournament final. They advanced to the NCAAs on an at-large bid due to a successful regular season, but were not most analysts' favorite to win the national title.

Following wins over Ohio State and Clarkson University, Maine advanced to the 1999 Frozen Four in Anaheim, California, where they would meet some familiar foes. Not long after Maine and Boston College met in the Hockey East semifinals, they squared off again in the national semis, with Maine goalie Alfie Michaud besting Scott Clemmensen and lifting the Black Bears past the Eagles 2–1 in overtime.

Though Maine's traditional nemesis for years was Boston University (not only through meaningful games, but because of a well-documented rivalry between Shawn Walsh and BU head coach Jack Parker), an even bigger feud was emerging between Maine and the neighboring New Hampshire Wildcats.

Led by Hobey Baker Award winner Jason Krog and future NHL goaltender Ty Conklin, #1 ranked UNH was primed to win their program's first national championship. Goals by Ben Guite and Niko Dimitrakos (Maine), and more outstanding goaltending by eventual tournament MVP Alfie Michaud kept Maine competitive and the scoreboard read 2–2 at the end of regulation.

Shortly after the 10-minute mark in OT, a careless play by UNH in their defensive zone turned into Maine's opportunity as Cory Larose swiped a drifting puck off the nearside boards and made a cross-ice pass to Marcus Gustafsson. Conklin made the initial save but with no defensive help, Gustafsson collected his own rebound and scored the game winner to clinch Maine's second national championship.

==== The Death of Walsh ====
Coach William "Shawn" Walsh inherited a relatively new and obscure hockey program at The University of Maine in 1984 and he was convinced that it could be built up to greatness. His finger was clearly on the pulse of every aspect of the program, and he held a sincere understanding of what it would take to develop success.

In order to achieve his goal, he needed to recruit skilled players, proper coaches to improve team caliber, the support of the university and its athletic department, and a strong fan base.

He took personal ownership in each of these categories. During its grassroots, there are even stories passed on of Walsh marching into the student dining commons, standing up and shouting on the tables, rallying students down to the games, and encouraging them to create a loud and hostile environment for Maine's opponents. The light blue "Maine-iak" shirts worn by the students at UMaine were one of his many ideas.

Most supporters and enthusiasts of the program credit the foundation of greatness held by the Black Bear Men's Ice Hockey team almost exclusively to Shawn Walsh.

In June 2000 Walsh was diagnosed with renal cell carcinoma (cancer of the kidneys). Knowing that his time may be limited, he hand-selected the coach he wanted to take over the team were he unable to continue. Always known as a fiery coach, Walsh surprised some when he selected mild-mannered UMass Lowell River Hawks coach Tim Whitehead (Hamilton '85). Whitehead earned his graduate degree in education at the University of Maine approximately 10 years prior, and during this time he worked with Walsh as a graduate assistant coach.

Shawn Walsh died from cancer on September 24, 2001.

A green clover with his name underneath is hung in his honor along with the three retired players' numbers in Alfond Arena. In 2006 the Shawn Walsh Hockey Center, a new extension of Alfond Arena with coaching and administrative offices, meeting areas, and new player facilities opened. This several-million-dollar project was funded through private donations—many coming from dozens of players Walsh coached through his 17 years with Maine.

=== Tim Whitehead era (2001–2013) ===
Tim Whitehead became the interim head coach following the death of Shawn Walsh at the start of the 2001–2002 season. He was later named the permanent head coach after a very successful first campaign in a year where he was eventually honored with the Spencer Penrose award which recognizes the NCAA coach of the year. Walsh won the Penrose award in 1995.

The team reached the championship game in 2002, the first season under Whitehead. Attempting to "win it for Shawn," they had to play The University of Minnesota Golden Gophers in the Gophers' home state for the finals. They were one minute away from a win when Minnesota tied the game with their goalie pulled. In overtime, after a tripping penalty on Michael Schutte of Maine, the Gophers scored the winning goal on the power play.

Two years later, backed by Jimmy Howard and Frank Doyle, future NHL player Dustin Penner, as well as notable forwards including Todd Jackson, Colin Shields, Maine's own Greg Moore and Derek Damon, conference rookie of the year Michel Leveille, and Prestin Ryan, Maine found itself back in the big game.

The Bears controlled the tempo and jumped on the board early against University of Denver on a Derek Damon goal, but the referees disallowed the goal explaining that part of the skate of Mike Hamilton crossed a line on the goalie crease as the goal went in. Though Howard only allowed one goal, Maine's offense could not find its rhythm after the disallowed goal and they lost 1–0.

That offseason, the NCAA reviewed the rule it followed to call off Maine's goal. They decided to adjust the rule to emulate the NHL's policy on this type of play, that is, only making a "man-in-the-crease" call if the player whose skate crosses the crease actually affects the outcome of the play or the goalie's ability to make the save.

==== Maine Recession ====
In the summer of 2008, assistant coach Guy Perron and Volunteer Assistant Coach Grant Standbrook both stepped aside from the program. Standbrook retired, while Perron was hired as an amateur scout for the Colorado Avalanche of the National Hockey League. In 2006 and 2007 Maine would go to the Frozen Four but hit a regrouping session in 2008. 2008 was a dark year as Maine finished 9th in Hockey East and didn't even qualify for the playoffs, then in 2009 Maine entered the Hockey East Playoffs 8th and was eliminated in the first round by BU.

In 2010 Maine reversed their two-year drought and finished 4th in Hockey East, Maine would go all the way to the Hockey East Championship but would lose to BC. The next year a resurgent Merrimack team finished 4th and eliminated Maine from the Hockey East Tournament and once again dashed their hopes of getting back to the national tournament. Going into the 2012 Maine didn't look very likely to break the 4-year drought, especially with the early departure of junior standout Gustav Nyquist, but Spencer Abbott would step up and have an incredible campaign. Abbott would lead the nation in scoring, and lead Maine to 4th in Hockey East, Maine would go all the way to the Hockey East championship, but would once again be beat by future national champion Boston College.

Even though Maine lost in the Hockey East championship they had a good enough record to qualify for the national tournament breaking a four-year drought. The terrific 2012 season ended in the first round of the national tournament with a loss to defending national champion University of Minnesota Duluth. Whitehead was fired on Tuesday April 9, 2013, after going 11–19–8.

=== Red Gendron era (2013–2021) ===
On May 17, 2013, University of Maine Paul W. Ferguson and director of athletics Steve Abbott introduced Red Gendron as the fourth men's hockey head coach in the history of the University of Maine. Gendron's first major step towards rebuilding Maine hockey came on June 10, 2013 when he named former Maine Black Bear and NHL player Ben Guité as his first assistant coach. On June 25, 2013, Gendron announced, longtime NHL coach and scout Jay Leach as associate head coach. Like Gendron, Leach previously served as an assistant coach for UMaine hockey under Shawn Walsh.

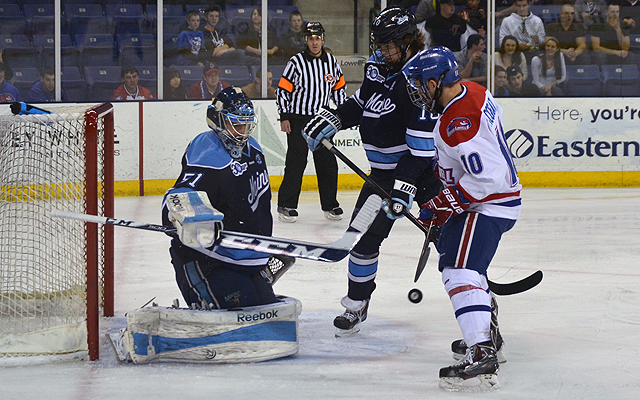
The Black Bears playing against UMass Lowell in 2014

The program continued to struggle under Red Gendron; the Black Bears have posted just two winning seasons since 2012, and in 2014–15, they finished dead last in the Hockey East standings, with an abysmal 8-24-6 overall record, their worst season since 1982. In April 2017, Jay Leach announced his retirement from the program. Coach Guite replaced him as associate head coach. That July, the program hired former Maine goaltender Alfie Michaud as assistant coach. In the 2017–18 season, the team began to make progress, posting an 18-16-4 record, including a nine-game unbeaten streak. The team's overall record fell back slightly to 15-17-4 in the 2018–19 season, but their Hockey East conference record climbed to 11-9-4, good for sixth place out of eleven teams. The following season saw the most successful campaign of Gendron's tenure. The team was picked to finish 8th in Hockey East play, and the season opener resulted in a 7–0 loss at Providence, the worst season-opening loss in program history. However, despite the poor start, the team exceeded its meager expectations; backed by goaltender Jeremy Swayman, the Black Bears managed to finished the regular season with an 18-11-5 record (12-9-3 HEA), finishing 4th in the league and earning home ice in the Hockey East quarterfinals for the first time since 2012. However, on March 12, 2020, the NCAA hockey season was cancelled due to the COVID-19 pandemic. Gendron was named Hockey East Coach of the Year; Swayman was named Hockey East Player of the Year and the Mike Richter Award as the nation's top goaltender, becoming the first Black Bear to earn the award.

Shortly after the end of Maine's abbreviated 2020–21 season, Gendron died following a medical episode while on a golf course.

=== Ben Barr era (2021–Present) ===
In May 2021, Ben Barr was hired as fifth head coach of the program. Taking over a program with just two winning seasons in the last decade, Barr had the difficult task of revitalizing what had formerly been one of the premier programs in the nation. Attendance had plummeted, the school's facilities were outdated and falling behind the rest of Hockey East, and the team had been unable to recruit high-end talent to Orono. The 2021-22 season showed just how much work there was to be done; Barr's first win as head coach didn't come until November 12, 2021, a 6-5 overtime win against Merrimack. The Black Bears finished 7-22-4, and placed last in Hockey East for the first time since the 1993-94 season (that team had 14 wins retroactively forfeited by the NCAA). In the second year of the Barr era, hopes were not high. Maine was picked by the preseason poll to finish last in Hockey East once again. However, better adapted to the modern game thanks to the new coaching staff, the Black Bears improved to 15-16-5, finishing 6th in Hockey East. Junior center Lynden Breen led the team with 21 goals, while junior goaltender Victor Ostman finished with a .918 save percentage and 2.21 GAA. Both players were named Second Team All-Hockey East. However, the Black Bears were upset in the opening round of the conference tournament, 4-2, by 11th place Vermont. Despite the loss, the near doubling in wins from the previous season, Maine was beginning to turn things around.

One of the factors contributing to the Maine hockey recession was its inability to attract high end talent. But that was about to change. As the 2023-24 season approached, Barr's third behind the bench, a promising freshman class came to Orono. They were led by a pair of players from the BCHL; Josh Nadeau, and his younger brother Bradly Nadeau. Bradly had the distinction of being the first Maine player to be taken in the first round since 1999. Maine also had a promising young goaltender join the team, Swedish netminder Albin Boija. Boija had at first been expected to join the team a year later, but a last minute opening allowed Barr and Alfie Michaud to bring him to Orono ahead of schedule. Led by the dynamic "New Brunswick Line," consisting of Lynden Breen and the Nadeau brothers, the Black Bears got back into the national spotlight. Despite being picked 9th in the preseason poll, Maine entered the winter break with a 10-3-1 record, and were nationally ranked. March saw the Black Bears finished 3rd place in Hockey East. On March 16, 2024, Ben Barr earned his first postseason victory, as his Black Bears routed archrival New Hampshire 5-0 at Alfond Arena. The win qualified Maine for its first trip to TD Garden for the semifinals since the 2011-12 season. They ultimately fell to Boston University 4-1, but their outstanding record earned them a berth in the 2024 NCAA tournament, their first in 12 years. Entering the regional semifinals as a 2 seed, they fell short to a veteran Cornell team, 3-1.

==== Reclaiming Hockey East ====
After posting the program's first 20-win season in over a decade, getting back to the Hockey East semifinals and the NCAA Tournament, Maine was once again in the conversation for national title contention. Coach Barr's efforts had brought Maine hockey back to life; Alfond Arena was once again conference leader in sellouts, and a $50 million grant had been approved for renovation of Alfond Arena and the Sean Walsh Hockey Center. Despite losing All-Hockey East Second Team and Rookie Team star Bradly Nadeau to the NHL, the team tapped into a new recruiting pool in college hockey; the transfer portal. Among the five players who transferred in ahead of the 2024-25 season was former Massachusetts forward Taylor Makar, a 7th round pick of the Colorado Avalanche and one of Barr's former players at Amherst. This team would be led by experience rather than talent, and by elite goaltending from sophomore Albin Boija. Entering the season ranked 12th in the national polls, the Black Bears started with a 6-0-1 run and was in the race for the top of Hockey East. Falling just short of Boston College, Maine finished the regular season 2nd in the conference. After beating UMass Lowell 7-1, the Bears moved onto TD Garden for the second straight year, where they met a red-hot 9th place Northeastern squad, who had just upset regular season champion BC. Despite jumping out to a 2-goal lead, Maine found themselves down 3-2 in the third period to the Huskies, who were being carried by an epic performance by sophomore goalie Cameron Whitehead, but a late goal sent the game to extra time. Over halfway through double overtime, senior center Nolan Renwick scored on the team's 61st shot, sending the Black Bears to their first conference title game since 2012. The following night, the Black Bears defeated Connecticut, 5-2, with Lynden Breen, the last player to play for Red Gendron, scoring the opening goal. For the first time in 21 years, the Maine Black Bears were back on top of Hockey East. Albin Boija was named the tournament MVP. However, the season would end in disappointment. Locking in a #1 seed in the 2025 NCAA tournament, Maine drew a spot in the Allentown Regional, and a semifinal match against a surging Penn State, just 90 miles from the Nittany Lion's campus. Playing what amounted to a road game, the Bears were defeated, 5-1. Maine finished the campaign with a 24-8-6 overall record. Albin Boija ended the season a runner up for the Mike Richter Award, and was named an AHCA Second Team All-American, posting a remarkable 1.93 GAA, .923 save percentage, and 4 shutouts.

Barr's first four years in Orono had proved a massive success. The revived Black Bears had posted back-to-back 20 win seasons in nearly 20 years, returned to the NCAA tournament twice, and had finally won the Hockey East tournament again. However, Coach Barr's first win in the national tournament remained elusive, and the departing group of players left the coaching staff with much work to do in the summer of 2025. Maine had been among the leaders in faceoffs for the last two seasons, and graduating from the team were their top three centers; Lynden Breen, Taylor Makar, and Harrison Scott. Defensive stalwart and captain David Breazeale graduated as well. While Barr still had a strong and experienced defensive corps, backed by a returning Boija, he needed to replace players who had accounted for nearly half of the team's goals the previous season. For that, the staff looked to take advantage of a landslide NCAA decision, which would change the landscape of college hockey. The NCAA had recently announced that players from Canada's CHL leagues, the QMJHL, WHL, and OHL, once considered professional, would be eligible for NCAA hockey. Maine was one of the programs to pounce on the opportunity; of the 13 incoming new players, 9 came from the CHL, including 5 NHL draft choices. With these factors in mind, Maine entered the 2025-26 campaign ranked 6th in the nation. The Black Bears opened the season against AHA team Holy Cross, and the talent on the roster was on full display; freshman forward Justin Poirier scored a hat trick in his collegiate debut. Maine would sweep the Crusaders, 5-2 and 6-0, with four of the five NHL prospects registering a point.

However, despite the strong start, Maine would turn in a disappointing campaign. The team's offense was productive, but team defense and goaltending turned out to be a liability throughout the season. Albin Boija and freshman Matthis Rousseau recorded the lowest team save percentage since the 2010-11 season. Poor locker room chemistry, low morale and personality problems among the new players were also frequently reported on. The lowest point came in December, when the Black Bears were swept at home, 1-0 and 3-2, by archrival New Hampshire. The frustrating season would end with a 5-0 loss to Boston College in the Hockey East quarterfinal, and the Black Bears finished 18-14-3 overall. There was one bright spot however; senior Brandon Holt led the team in scoring and turned in an exceptional defensive performance. He would become the first Maine skater to be named an AHCA All-American since 2014. He was also named Hockey East Best Defensive Defenseman.

== Season-by-season results ==
Source:

== Coaches ==
=== All-time coaching records ===
As of the completion of 2025–26 season

Tenure	Coach	Years	Record	Pct.
1922–1923	Cuddy Murphy	1	2–3–0	.400
1923–1924	Stanley Wallace	1	4–8–0	.333
1977–1984	Jack Semler	7	100–112–1	.472
1984–1995, 1995–2001	Shawn Walsh	17†	399–215–44	.640
1995–1996	Greg Cronin	1†	21–13–2	.611
2001–2013	Tim Whitehead	12	250–171–54	.583
2013–2021	Red Gendron	8	103–137–33	.438
2021–present	Ben Barr	4	87–72–20	.542
Totals	7 coaches	48 seasons	948–717–151	.564

† Greg Cronin served as the interim head coach for the 1 year that Shawn Walsh was suspended.

== Championships ==
=== National Championships ===
Year	Champion	Score	Runner-up	City	Arena
1993	Maine	5–4	Lake Superior State	Milwaukee, WI	Bradley Center
1999	Maine	3–2 (OT)	New Hampshire	Anaheim, CA	Arrowhead Pond of Anaheim

Runners-up in 1995, 2002, 2004

=== Hockey East Tournament Championships ===
Year	Champion	Score	Runner-up	Notes
1989	Maine	5–4	Boston College	Lost to Minnesota in Frozen Four
1992	Maine	4–1	New Hampshire	Lost to Michigan State in Regional Final
1993	Maine	5–2	Boston University	Defeated Lake Superior State in national championship game
2000	Maine	2–1	Boston College	Lost to North Dakota in Frozen Four
2004	Maine	2–1 (3OT)	Massachusetts	Lost to Denver in national championship game
2025	Maine	5–2	Connecticut	Lost to Penn State in Regional Semifinals

Runners-up in 1987, 1988, 1990, 1991, 1996, 1998, 2002, 2010, 2012

== Rivalries ==
=== Border War / New Hampshire Wildcats ===
The Border War refers to the rivalry between the UNH Wildcats and the Maine Black Bears. College Hockey News has ranked it as the seventh best Division I college hockey rivalry. The Rivalry is extremely intense because of the proximity of the states and the overall success of the two programs. The two programs have also met many times in meaningful post-season games. In 1999 Maine defeated UNH 3–2 in overtime to claim their second national championship, this essentially started the chant "We have 2, How about you!" chanted by Maine fans. Then again in 2002 Maine beat UNH in the national semifinals for a chance at the national championship. Maine and UNH has also met in the Hockey East playoffs many times, fueling the rivalry even more. In 2012 Maine once again defeated UNH in a large scale game at Fenway Park, winning 5–4 in overtime.

=== Boston College Eagles ===
The rivalry between Maine and BC is not one of as much publicity as that of Maine/UNH or BC/BU, but is still intense. Maine and BC have met in 7 Hockey East Championship games with Maine winning 2 of those championships, The teams have also met in 4 Hockey East semifinals, with Maine winning 1 semifinal against BC. This rivalry is another rivalry where the success of both teams has contributed to the intensity of the games between the two teams. Maine and BC have also met in 2 national semifinals, Maine won both meetings, but never in a national championship game. Maine and BC have 7 combined national championships.

=== Boston University Terriers ===
The rivalry between Maine and BU is one much like Maine/BC. They've only met in 2 Hockey East Championship, games each team winning one. In 1993 Maine lost only one game all year to BU, this loss came after taking a large lead and blowing it. Maine and BU also met in the 1995 National Championship game, BU won the game 6–2. Maine and BU have met 6 times in the Hockey East semifinals, Maine has won all 6 semifinals. The intensity of the games, combined with the mutual dislike of the fans results in very heated games every time they meet.

== Florida College Classic ==
The Florida College Classic was an annual single elimination tournament played in Estero, Florida at Germain Arena. The Tournament was co-hosted by Maine and Cornell each year, with two other teams participating each season to form a semifinal format. Since Shawn Walsh was so instrumental to the inception of the tournament the Most Outstanding Player received the Shawn Walsh Memorial Trophy. Maine won 6 Florida College Classics prior to ending their involvement with the tournament in 2014.

== Current roster ==
As of August 14, 2025.

No.	Nat.	Player	Class	Pos	Height	Weight	DoB	Hometown	Previous team	NHL rights
2	(United States)	Lukas Peterson	Freshman	D	5' 10" (1.78 m)	168 lb (76 kg)	2006-02-15	Waldwick, New Jersey	Green Bay Gamblers (USHL)	—
4	(United States)	Brandon Holt	Senior	D	5' 11" (1.8 m)	175 lb (79 kg)	2001-04-30	Grand Forks, North Dakota	New Mexico Ice Wolves (NAHL)	—
7	(Canada)	Jeremy Langlois	Freshman	D	6' 1" (1.85 m)	185 lb (84 kg)	2003-09-19	Sainte-Brigitte-de-Laval, Quebec	Rouyn-Noranda Huskies (QMJHL)	ARI, 94th overall 2022
10	(Canada)	Luke Coughlin	Freshman	D	5' 10" (1.78 m)	183 lb (83 kg)	2005-04-11	Charlottetown, Prince Edward Island	Rimouski Oceanic (QMJHL)	FLA, 191st overall 2023
11	(United States)	Charlie Russell	Junior	F	5' 11" (1.8 m)	174 lb (79 kg)	2003-08-21	Houghton, Michigan	Green Bay Gamblers (USHL)	—
12	(United States)	Owen Fowler	Junior	F	5' 9" (1.75 m)	182 lb (83 kg)	2002-06-04	Tewksbury, Massachusetts	Massachusetts Lowell (HEA)	—
14	(United States)	Sully Scholle	Junior	F	5' 10" (1.78 m)	170 lb (77 kg)	2003-03-19	Chaska, Minnesota	New Mexico Ice Wolves (NAHL)	—
15	(United States)	Brandon Chabrier	Senior	D	6' 0" (1.83 m)	178 lb (81 kg)	2002-07-19	Bayville, New York	Madison Capitols (USHL)	—
16	(Canada)	Loïc Usereau	Freshman	D	6' 0" (1.83 m)	176 lb (80 kg)	2004-12-31	Saint-Michel, Quebec	Chicoutimi Sagueneens (QMJHL)	—
18	(United States)	Simon Motew	Freshman	D	6' 0" (1.83 m)	183 lb (83 kg)	2003-03-31	Highland Park, Illinois	St. Francis Xavier (AUS)	—
20	(Canada)	Josh Nadeau	Sophomore	F	5' 8" (1.73 m)	158 lb (72 kg)	2003-10-22	Saint-François-de-Madawaska, New Brunswick	Penticton Vees (BCHL)	—
21	(United States)	Nick Peluso	Freshman	F	5' 8" (1.73 m)	174 lb (79 kg)	2004-02-14	Rochester, New York	Brooks Bandits (BCHL)	—
22	(Canada)	Will Gerrior	Freshman	F	5' 10" (1.78 m)	179 lb (81 kg)	2004-03-02	Halifax, Nova Scotia	Ottawa 67's (OHL)	—
23	(Canada)	Grayson Arnott	Senior	D	5' 9" (1.75 m)	152 lb (69 kg)	2001-06-14	Toronto, Ontario	Penticton Vees (BCHL)	—
24	(United States)	Brock James	Freshman	F	6' 2" (1.88 m)	201 lb (91 kg)	2004-06-01	Falmouth, Maine	Sioux Falls Stampede (USHL)	—
26	(Scotland)	Thomas Freel	Senior	F	5' 11" (1.8 m)	180 lb (82 kg)	2001-06-26	Aberdeen, Scotland	Ottawa Jr. Senators (CCHL)	—
27	(United States)	Max Scott	Sophomore	F	6' 0" (1.83 m)	185 lb (84 kg)	2002-10-11	San Jose, California	Brown (ECAC)	—
28	(United States)	Anthony Calafiore	Junior	F	5' 9" (1.75 m)	170 lb (77 kg)	2002-04-06	Staten Island, New York	New Jersey Titans (NAHL)	—
29	(Canada)	Thomas Pichette	Sophomore	F	5' 11" (1.8 m)	181 lb (82 kg)	2003-07-03	Maskinongé, Quebec	Penticton Vees (USHL)	—
30	(Sweden)	Albin Boija	Junior	G	6' 1" (1.85 m)	181 lb (82 kg)	2003-08-20	Sundsvall, Sweden	Växjö J20 (J20 Nationell)	—
32	(Canada)	Mathis Rousseau	Freshman	G	5' 11" (1.8 m)	174 lb (79 kg)	2004-09-10	Montréal, Quebec	Moncton Wildcats (QMJHL)	—
34	(Canada)	Bodie Nobes	Junior	D	5' 10" (1.78 m)	185 lb (84 kg)	2003-07-18	Sainte-Thérèse, Quebec	Green Bay Gamblers (USHL)	—
35	(Canada)	Gage Stewart	Sophomore	G	6' 0" (1.83 m)	190 lb (86 kg)	2003-06-17	Marathon, Ontario	Fort McMurray Oil Barons (AJHL)	—
38	(Finland)	Oskar Komarov	Sophomore	F	5' 11" (1.8 m)	183 lb (83 kg)	2003-10-06	Uusikaarlepyy, Finland	Langley Rivermen (BCHL)	—
41	(United States)	Jaden Lipinski	Freshman	F	6' 4" (1.93 m)	209 lb (95 kg)	2004-12-02	Scottsdale, Arizona	Vancouver Giants (WHL)	CGY, 112th overall 2023
43	(Canada)	Miguel Marques	Freshman	F	5' 11" (1.8 m)	185 lb (84 kg)	2006-03-08	Prince George, British Columbia	Lethbridge Hurricanes (WHL)	NSH, 87th overall 2024
44	(United States)	Frank Djurasevic	Junior	D	6' 2" (1.88 m)	198 lb (90 kg)	2002-03-09	New Rochelle, New York	Merrimack (HEA)	—
93	(Canada)	Justin Poirier	Freshman	F	5' 8" (1.73 m)	185 lb (84 kg)	2006-09-04	Salaberry-de-Valleyfield, Quebec	Baie-Comeau Drakkar (QMJHL)	CAR, 156th overall 2024

== Awards and honors ==
=== Hockey Hall of Fame ===
- Paul Kariya (2017)

=== NCAA ===
==== Individual awards ====
Hobey Baker Award

- Scott Pellerin: 1992
- Paul Kariya: 1993

Spencer Penrose Award

- Shawn Walsh: 1995
- Tim Whitehead: 2002

Mike Richter Award

- Jeremy Swayman: 2020

Derek Hines Unsung Hero Award

- Brice O'Connor: 2014

NCAA Scoring Champion

- Paul Kariya: 1993
- Gustav Nyquist: 2010
- Spencer Abbott: 2012

Tournament Most Outstanding Player

- Jim Montgomery: 1993
- Alfie Michaud: 1999

==== All-American Teams ====
AHCA First Team All-Americans

- 1979–80: Andre Aubut, D
- 1980–81: Gary Conn, F
- 1987–88: Jack Capuano, D; Dave Capuano, F
- 1988–89: Dave Capuano, F
- 1990–91: Keith Carney, D; Jean-Yves Roy, F
- 1991–92: Scott Pellerin, F; Jean-Yves Roy, F
- 1992–93: Mike Dunham, G; Chris Imes, D; Paul Kariya, F
- 1994–95: Blair Allison, G; Chris Imes, D
- 1995–96: Jeff Tory, D
- 1998–99: David Cullen, D; Steve Kariya, F
- 2005–06: Greg Moore, F
- 2006–07: Michel Léveillé, F
- 2009–10: Gustav Nyquist, F
- 2011–12: Spencer Abbott, F
- 2019–20: Jeremy Swayman, G
- 2025-26: Brandon Holt, D

AHCA Second Team All-Americans

- 1986–87: Eric Weinrich, D
- 1987–88: Mike Golden, F; Mike McHugh, F
- 1988–89: Bob Beers, F
- 1989–90: Keith Carney, D; Jean-Yves Roy, F
- 1990–91: Jim Montgomery, F
- 1992–93: Cal Ingraham, F; Jim Montgomery, F
- 1994–95: Jeff Tory, D
- 1999-00: Cory Larose, F
- 2001–02: Peter Metcalf, D; Niko Dimitrakos, F
- 2003–04: Jimmy Howard, G; Prestin Ryan, D; Todd Jackson, F; Colin Shields, F
- 2005–06: Michel Léveillé, F
- 2010–11: Gustav Nyquist, F
- 2013–14: Ben Hutton, D; Devin Shore, F
- 2024–25: Albin Boija, G

=== ECAC Hockey ===
==== All-Conference Teams ====
First Team All-ECAC Hockey

- 1979–80: Andre Aubut, D
- 1980–81: Gary Conn, F

Second Team All-ECAC Hockey

- 1980–81: Jeff Nord, G; Andre Aubut, D

=== Hockey East ===
==== Individual awards ====
Player of the Year

- Mike McHugh, LW: 1988
- Scott Pellerin, LW: 1992
- Paul Kariya, LW: 1993
- Chris Imes, D: 1995
- Spencer Abbott, RW: 2012
- Jeremy Swayman, G: 2020

Rookie of the Year

- Al Loring, G: 1986
- Mario Thyer, C: 1988
- Scott Pellerin, LW: 1989
- Paul Kariya, LW: 1993
- Jimmy Howard, G: 2003
- Michel Léveillé, C: 2004
- Teddy Purcell, RW: 2007

Goaltending Champion

- Scott King: 1987, 1988, 1990
- Garth Snow: 1993
- Blair Allison: 1995
- Jimmy Howard: 2004
- Jeremy Swayman: 2020

Best Defensive Forward

- Todd Jackson, LW: 2004
- Tanner House, C: 2011
- Chase Pearson, C: 2019
- Owen Fowler, LW: 2026

Len Ceglarski Award

- Steve Kariya, LW: 1997, 1998, 1999
- Cory Larose, C: 2000
- Martin Kariya, LW: 2003
- Mike Lundin, D: 2007
- Brian Flynn, RW: 2011
- Brandon Holt, D: 2026

Best Defensive Defenseman

- Cliff Loya: 2003
- Prestin Ryan: 2004
- Brandon Holt: 2026

Coach of the Year

- Shawn Walsh: 1988, 1990, 1993, 1995
- Red Gendron: 2020

Tournament Most Valuable Player

- Bob Beers, D: 1989
- Scott Pellerin, LW: 1992
- Jim Montgomery, C: 1993
- Niko Dimitrakos, RW: 2000
- Jimmy Howard, G: 2004
- Albin Boija, G: 2025

Three-Stars Award

- Martin Ouellette: 2013

==== All-Conference Teams ====
First Team

- 1986–87: Eric Weinrich, D
- 1987–88: Scott King, G; Jack Capuano, D; Mike McHugh, F; Dave Capuano, F
- 1988–89: Dave Capuano, F
- 1989–90: Scott King, G
- 1990–91: Keith Carney, D; Jean-Yves Roy, F
- 1991–92: Scott Pellerin, F
- 1992–93: Mike Dunham, G; Chris Imes, D; Paul Kariya, F; Jim Montgomery, F
- 1994–95: Blair Allison, G; Chris Imes, D; Jeff Tory, D
- 1995–96: Blair Allison, G; Jeff Tory, D; Tim Lovell, F
- 1996–97: Jason Mansoff, D; Tim Lovell, F
- 1998–99: David Cullen, D; Steve Kariya, F
- 1999–00: Cory Larose, F
- 2001–02: Mike Morrison, G; Peter Metcalf, D
- 2002–03: Francis Nault, D; Martin Kariya, F
- 2003–04: Jimmy Howard, G
- 2005–06: Greg Moore, F
- 2006–07: Michel Léveillé, F
- 2009–10: Gustav Nyquist, F
- 2010–11: Gustav Nyquist, F
- 2011–12: Spencer Abbott, F; Brian Flynn, F
- 2013–14: Ben Hutton, D; Devin Shore, F
- 2019–20: Jeremy Swayman, G
- 2025-26: Brandon Holt, D; Josh Nadeau, F

Second Team

- 1986–87: Jack Capuano, D
- 1987–88: Mike Golden, F
- 1988–89: Scott King, G; Bob Beers, D
- 1989–90: Keith Carney, D
- 1990–91: Shaun Kane, D; Jim Montgomery, F
- 1991–92: Garth Snow, G; Chris Imes, D; Jim Montgomery, F; Jean-Yves Roy, F
- 1992–93: Garth Snow, G
- 2001–02: Niko Dimitrakos, F
- 2002–03: Lucas Lawson, F
- 2003–04: Prestin Ryan, D; Todd Jackson, F; Colin Shields, F
- 2005–06: Michel Léveillé, F
- 2006–07: Mike Lundin, D; Josh Soares, F
- 2007–08: Ben Bishop, G
- 2009–10: Jeff Dimmen, D
- 2010–11: Josh Van Dyk, D
- 2011–12: Joey Diamond, F
- 2014–15: Devin Shore, F
- 2018–19: Chase Pearson, F
- 2019–20: Mitchell Fossier, F
- 2022–23: Victor Ostman, G; Lynden Breen, F
- 2023–24: Bradly Nadeau, F
- 2024–25: Albin Boija, G

Third Team

- 2018–19: Jeremy Swayman, G; Brady Keeper, D; Mitchell Fossier, F
- 2023-24: Josh Nadeau, F
- 2024–25: Brandon Holt, D

Rookie Team

- 1986–87: Dave Capuano, D
- 1987–88: Mario Thyer, F
- 1988–89: Keith Carney, D; Scott Pellerin, F
- 1989–90: Jim Montgomery, F; Jean-Yves Roy, F
- 1990–91: Patrice Tardif, F
- 1992–93: David MacIsaac, D; Chris Ferraro, F; Paul Kariya, F
- 1994–95: Jeff Tory, D; Shawn Wansborough, F
- 1995–96: Brett Clark, D; Steve Kariya, F
- 1996–97: Cory Larose, F
- 1997–98: Matthias Trattnig, F
- 1998–99: Peter Metcalf, D; Barrett Heisten, F
- 2001–02: Colin Shields, F
- 2002–03: Jimmy Howard, G
- 2003–04: Michel Léveillé, F
- 2004–05: Bret Tyler, D
- 2005–06: Ben Bishop, G
- 2006–07: Teddy Purcell, F
- 2008–09: Gustav Nyquist, F
- 2010–11: Dan Sullivan, G
- 2017–18: Jeremy Swayman, G
- 2021–22: David Breazeale, D
- 2023–24: Bradly Nadeau, F

== Statistical leaders ==
=== Career points leaders ===
Player	Years	GP	G	A	Pts	PIM
Jim Montgomery	1989–1993	170	103	198	301	
Scott Pellerin	1988–1992	167	106	117	223	
Gary Conn	1977–1981	127	107	114	221	
Dave Capuano	1986–1989	122	89	122	211	
Jean-Yves Roy	1989–1992	124	108	95	203	
Steve Kariya	1995–1999	150	78	109	187	
Cory Larose	1996–2000	146	61	119	180	
Martin Robitaille	1988–1992	165	69	106	175	
Joe Crespi	1977–1981	125	78	90	168	
Cal Ingraham	1991–1994	106	73	86	159	

=== Career goaltending leaders ===
GP = Games played; Min = Minutes played; W = Wins; L = Losses; T = Ties; GA = Goals against; SO = Shutouts; SV% = Save percentage; GAA = Goals against average

minimum 30 games played

Player	Years	GP	Min	W	L	T	GA	SO	SV%	GAA
Jimmy Howard	2002–2005	82	4825	47	23	10	148	15	.931	1.84
Albin Boija	2023-2027	75	4442	43	21	10	153	10	.918	2.07
Mike Morrison	1998–2002	64	3095	32	8	9	113	1	.915	2.19
Ben Bishop	2005–2008	98	5607	55	34	7	21	5	.918	2.29
Jeremy Swayman	2017–2020	100	5907	47	40	12	247	4	.927	2.51

Statistics current through the start of the 2022–23 season.

== Records ==
=== NCAA ===
==== Individual ====
- Most Power Play Goals in a Game: Jay Mazur, 4 (Feb 17, 1987 vs UMass Lowell)

==== Team ====
- Most Wins in a Season: 42 (1992–93)
- Most Goals in a Season: 292 (1992–93)
- Most Goals in a Period: 11 (Nov 11, 1978 vs St Thomas)
- Most Power Play Goals in a Game: 8 (March 3, 1990 vs UMass Lowell)

=== Hockey East ===
==== Individual ====
- Most Goals In A Game: Brian Flynn and Jay Mazur, 5
- Most Power Play Goals In A Game: Jay Mazur, 4 (Feb 7, 1987 vs UMass Lowell)
- Most Points In A Game By A Defenseman: Jack Capuano, 6 (Jan 30, 1988 vs New Hampshire)
- Most Points In A Season By A Rookie: Paul Kariya, 63 (1992–93)
- Most Assists In A Season By A Rookie: Paul Kariya, 48 (1992–93)
- Most Assists In A Game By A Rookie: Paul Kariya, 5 (Dec 5, 1992 vs Northeastern)
- Longest Point Streak: Paul Kariya, 23 games (1992–93)

==== Team ====
- Best Win Percentage In A Season: .938 (1992–93)
- Fewest Losses In A Season: 1 (1992–93)
- Most Road Wins In A Season: 12 (1992–93)
- Longest Winning Streak: 16 (Nov 7, 1992 - Feb 13, 1993)
- Longest Unbeaten Streak: 30 (Jan 25, 1992 - Feb 13, 1993)
- Fewest Goals Allowed In A Season: 42 (2003–04)
- Most Power Play Goals In A Season: 50 (1990–91)
- Most Short-Handed Goals In A Game: 3 (Jan 23, 2004 vs Boston University)

=== Program Records ===
==== Single Season ====
- Most Goals: Cal Ingraham; 46 (1992–93)
- Most Assists: Paul Kariya; 75 (1992–93)
- Most Points: Paul Kariya; 100 (1992–93)
- Most Points By A Defenseman: Keith Carney; 56 (1990–91)
- Most Points By A Rookie: Paul Kariya; 100 (1992–93)
- Most Wins: Blair Allison; 32 (1994–95)
- Most Wins By A Rookie: Ben Bishop; 21 (2005–06)
- Lowest Goals Against Average: Jimmy Howard; 1.19 (2003–04)
- Best Save Percentage: Jimmy Howard; .956 (2003–04)
- Most Saves: Jeremy Swayman; 1,099 (2019–20)
- Most Shutouts: Jimmy Howard; 6 (2003–04, 2004–05)

==== Career ====
- Most Goals: Jean-Yves Roy, 108
- Most Assists: Jim Montgomery, 198
- Most Points: Jim Montgomery, 301
- Most Points By A Defenseman: Keith Carney, 128
- Most Wins: Garth Snow, 64
- Best Goals Against Average: Jimmy Howard, 1.84
- Best Save Percentage: Jimmy Howard, .931
- Most Shutouts: Jimmy Howard, 15

== Olympians ==
This is a list of Maine alumni were a part of an Olympic team.

Name	Position	Maine Tenure	Team	Year	Finish
Eric Weinrich	Right Wing	1985–1988	(United States) USA	1988	7th
Garth Snow	Goaltender	1988–1992	(United States) USA	1994	8th
Jean-Yves Roy	Right Wing	1989–1992	Canada	1994	Silver
Kent Salfi	Center	1989–1992	Austria	2002	12th
Matt Martin	Defenseman	1990–1993	(United States) USA	1994	8th
Chris Imes	Defenseman	1990–1993, 1994–1995	(United States) USA	1994	8th
Peter Ferraro	Right Wing	1992–1994	(United States) USA	1994	8th
Mike Dunham	Goaltender	1990–1993	(United States) USA	1994, 2002	8th, Silver
Paul Kariya	Left Wing	1992–1994	Canada	1994, 2002	Silver, Gold
Keith Carney	Defenseman	1989–1991	(United States) USA	1998	6th
Jimmy Howard	Goaltender	2002–2005	(United States) USA	2014	4th
Jeremy Swayman	Goaltender	2017–2020	(United States) USA	2026	Gold
Eduards Tralmaks	Left Wing	2017–2021	(Latvia) LAT	2026	10th

* indicates the competition is ongoing, and winners have yet to be determined and announced.

== Maine Sports Hall of Fame ==
The following is a list of people associated with the Maine men's ice hockey program who were elected into the Maine Sports Hall of Fame (induction date in parentheses).

- Andre Aubut (1988)
- Dave Capuano (2008)
- Jack Capuano (2013)
- Keith Carney (2009)
- Gary Conn (1989)
- Mike Dunham (2010)
- Jimmy Howard (2011)
- Chris Imes (2003)
- Ray Jacques (2018)
- Paul Kariya (1999)
- Steve Kariya (2012)
- Scott King (2005)
- Mike McHugh (2006)
- 1993 Team (2017)
- Jim Montgomery (1998)
- Scott Pellerin (1997)
- Jean-Yves Roy (2004)
- Garth Snow (2007)
- Grant Standbrook (2017)
- Shawn Walsh (2002)
- Eric Weinrich (1994)

== Black Bears in the NHL ==
As of July 1, 2025.

= NHL All-Star team	= NHL All-Star	= NHL All-Star and NHL All-Star team	= Hall of Famers

Player	Position	Team(s)	Years	Games	Stanley Cups
Spencer Abbott	Forward	TOR, CHI	2013–2017	2	0
Shawn Anderson	Defenseman	BUF, QUE, WSH, PHI	1986–1995	255	0
Bob Beers	Defenseman	BOS, TBL, EDM, NYI	1989–1997	258	0
Ben Bishop	Goaltender	STL, OTT, TBL, LAK, DAL	2008–2020	413	0
Dave Capuano	Left Wing	PIT, VAN, TBL, SJS	1989–1994	104	0
Jack Capuano	Defenseman	TOR, VAN, BOS	1989–1992	6	0
Keith Carney	Defenseman	BUF, CHI, PHO, ANA, VAN, MIN	1991–2008	1,018	0
Brett Clark	Defenseman	MTL, ATL, COL, TBL, MIN	1997–2013	689	0
Bob Corkum	Center	BUF, ANA, PHI, PHO, LAK, NJD, ATL	1989–2002	720	0
David Cullen	Defenseman	PHO, MIN	2000–2002	19	0
Scott Darling	Goaltender	CHI , CAR	2014–2019	126	1
Matt DelGuidice	Goaltender	BOS	1990–1992	11	0
Niko Dimitrakos	Center	SJS, PHI	2002–2007	158	0
Mike Dunham	Goaltender	NJD, NSH, NYR, ATL, NYI	1996–2007	394	0
Chris Ferraro	Center	NYR, PIT, EDM, NYI, WSH	1995–2002	74	0
Peter Ferraro	Right Wing	NYR, PIT, BOS, WSH	1995–2002	92	0
Brian Flynn	Center	BUF, MTL	2012–2017	275	0
Ben Guité	Center	BOS, COL, NSH	2005–2010	175	0
Barrett Heisten	Left Wing	NYR	2001–2002	10	0
Jimmy Howard	Goaltender	DET	2005–2020	543	0
Ben Hutton	Defenseman	VAN, LAK, ANA, TOR, VGK	2015–Present	520	1
Doug Janik	Defenseman	BUF, TBL, DAL, MTL, DET	2002–2012	190	0
Paul Kariya	Left Wing	ANA, COL, NSH, STL	1994–2010	989	0
Steve Kariya	Left Wing	VAN	1999–2001	65	0
Brady Keeper	Defenseman	FLA	2019–2021	2	0
Scott King	Goaltender	DET	1990–1992	2	0
Cory Larose	Center	NYR	2003–2004	7	0
Jeff Libby	Defenseman	NYI	1997–1998	1	0
Ryan Lomberg	Left Wing	CGY, FLA	2017–Present	337	1
Mike Lundin	Defenseman	TBL, MIN, OTT	2007–2013	252	0

Player	Position	Team(s)	Years	Games	Stanley Cups
Bruce Major	Center	QUE	1990–1991	4	0
Matt Martin	Defenseman	TOR	1993–1997	76	0
Jay Mazur	Right Wing	VAN	1988–1992	47	0
Mike McHugh	Left Wing	MNS, SJS	1993–1997	20	0
Alfie Michaud	Goaltender	VAN	1999–2000	2	0
Jim Montgomery	Center	STL, MTL, PHI, SJS, DAL	1993–2003	122	0
Greg Moore	Defenseman	NYR, CBJ	2007–2010	10	0
Mike Morrison	Goaltender	EDM, OTT, PHO	2005–2007	29	0
Bradly Nadeau	Left Wing	CAR	2023–Present	3	0
Gustav Nyquist	Right Wing	DET, SJS, CBJ, MIN, NSH	2011–Present	863	0
Will O'Neill	Defenseman	PHI	2017–2018	1	0
Victor Östman	Goaltender	SEA	2024–Present	1	0
Chase Pearson	Center	DET	2021–2022	3	0
Scott Pellerin	Defenseman	NJD, STL, MIN, CAR, BOS, DAL	1992–2004	536	0
Dustin Penner	Left Wing	ANA, EDM, LAK, WSH	2005–2014	589	2
Teddy Purcell	Right Wing	LAK, TBL, EDM, FLA	2007–2017	571	0
Dan Renouf	Defenseman	DET, COL, BOS	2016–2023	24	0
Jean-Yves Roy	Right Wing	NYR, OTT, BOS	1994–1998	61	0
Prestin Ryan	Defenseman	VAN	2005–2006	1	0
Claudio Scremin	Defenseman	SJS	1991–1993	17	0
Devin Shore	Center	DAL, ANA, CBJ, EDM, SEA, MIN	2015–Present	498	0
Zach Sill	Center	PIT, TOR, WSH	2013–2016	93	0
Garth Snow	Goaltender	QUE, PHI, VAN, PIT, NYI	1993–2006	368	0
Jeremy Swayman	Goaltender	BOS	2020–Present	190	0
Patrice Tardif	Defenseman	STL, LAK	1994–1996	65	0
Stephen Tepper	Right Wing	CHI	1992–1993	1	0
Mario Thyer	Center	Min	1989–1990	5	0
Eric Weinrich	Defenseman	NJD, HFD, CHI, MTL, BOS, PHI, STL, VAN	1988–2006	1,157	0
Brian White	Center	COL	1998–1999	2	0
Matthew Yeats	Goaltender	WSH	2003–2004	5	0

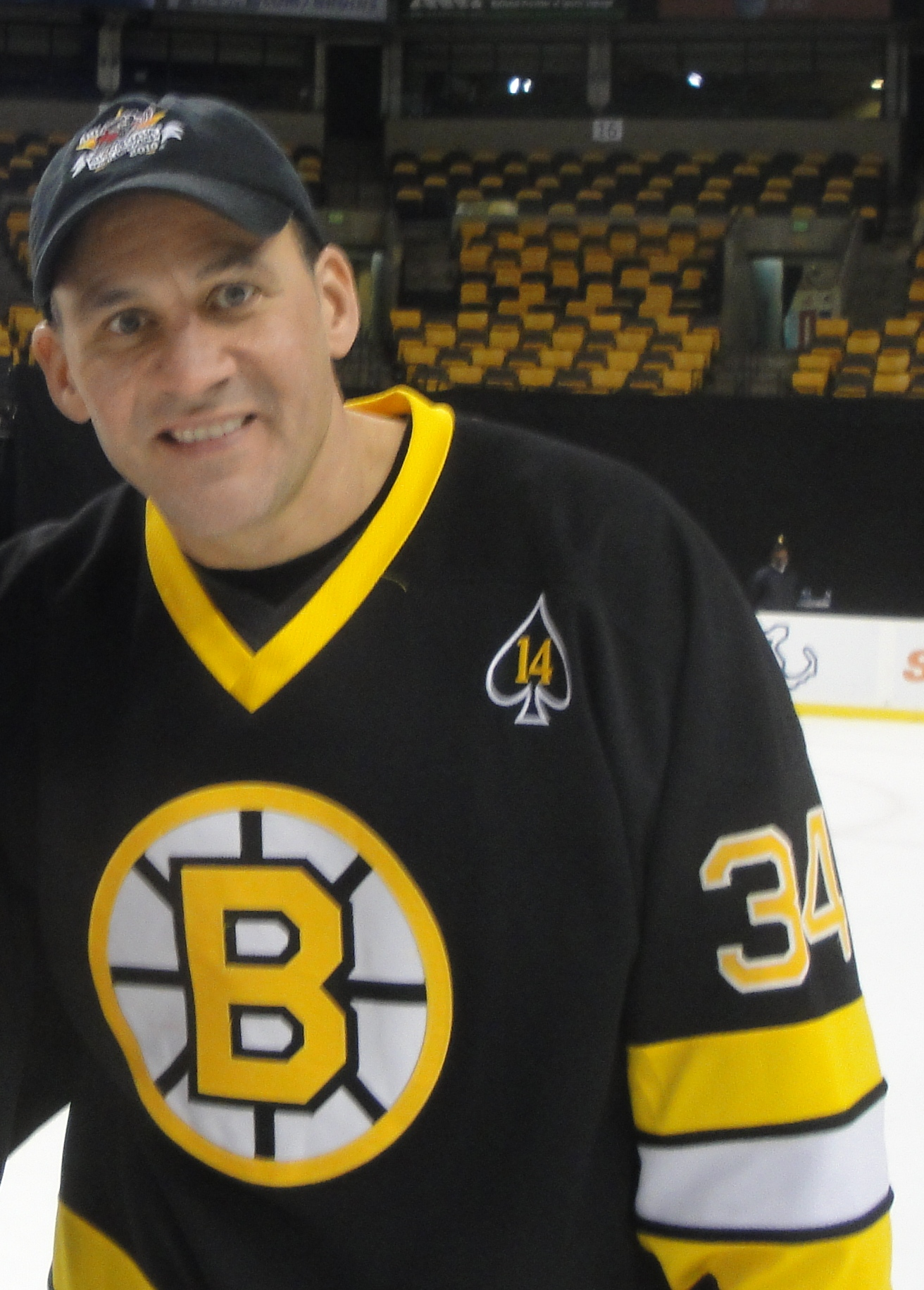
Bob Beers

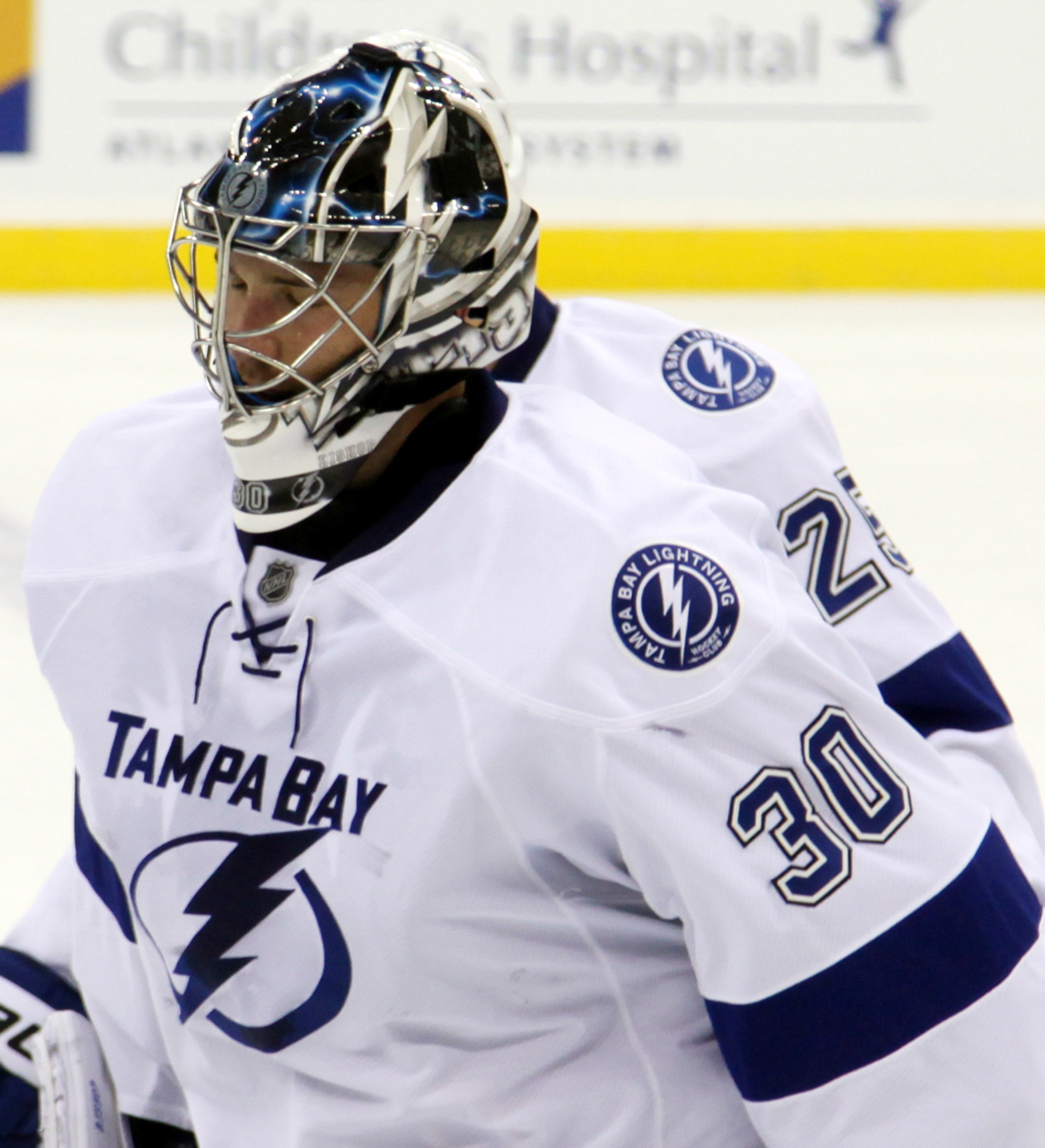
Ben Bishop

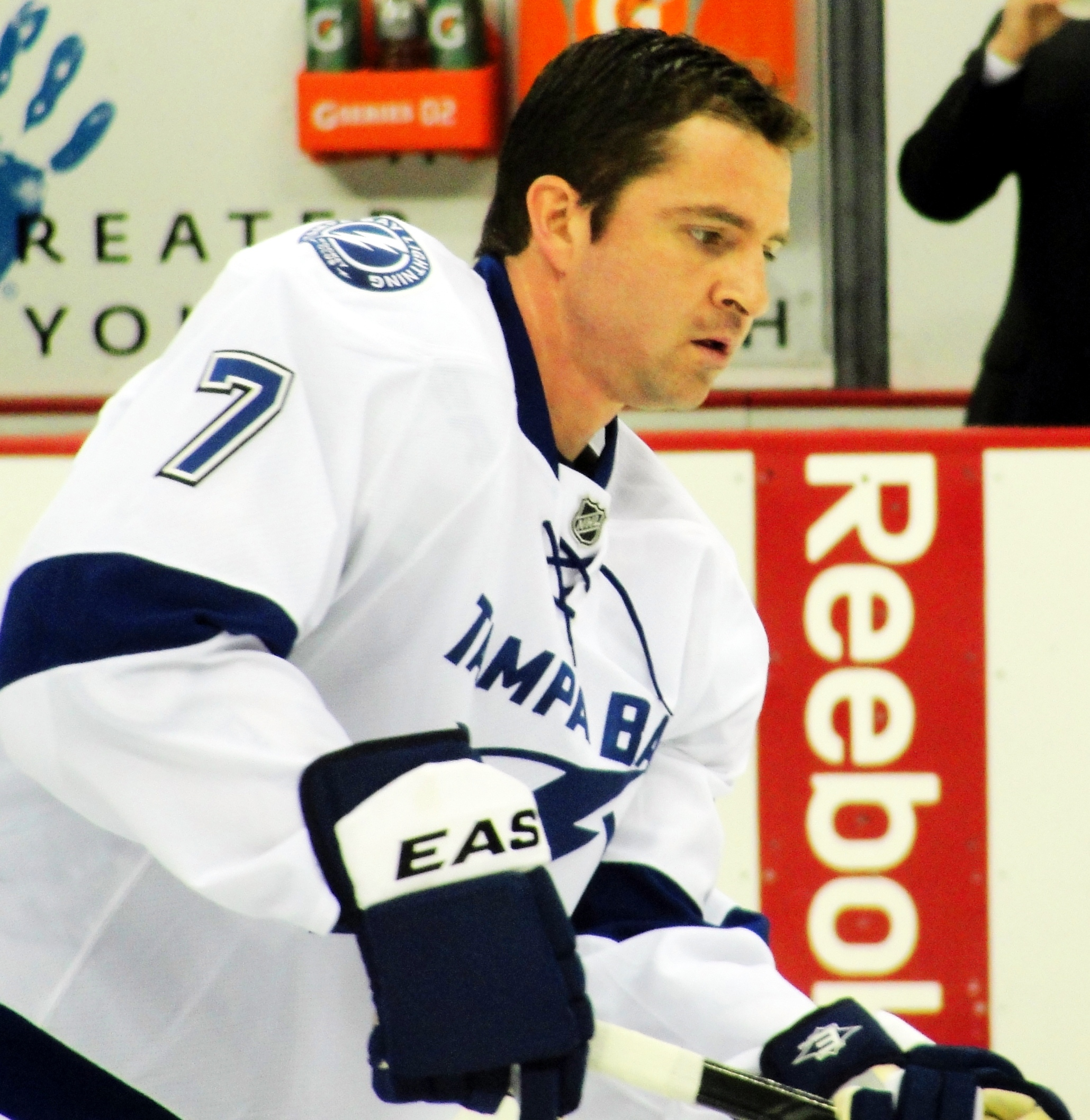
Brett Clark

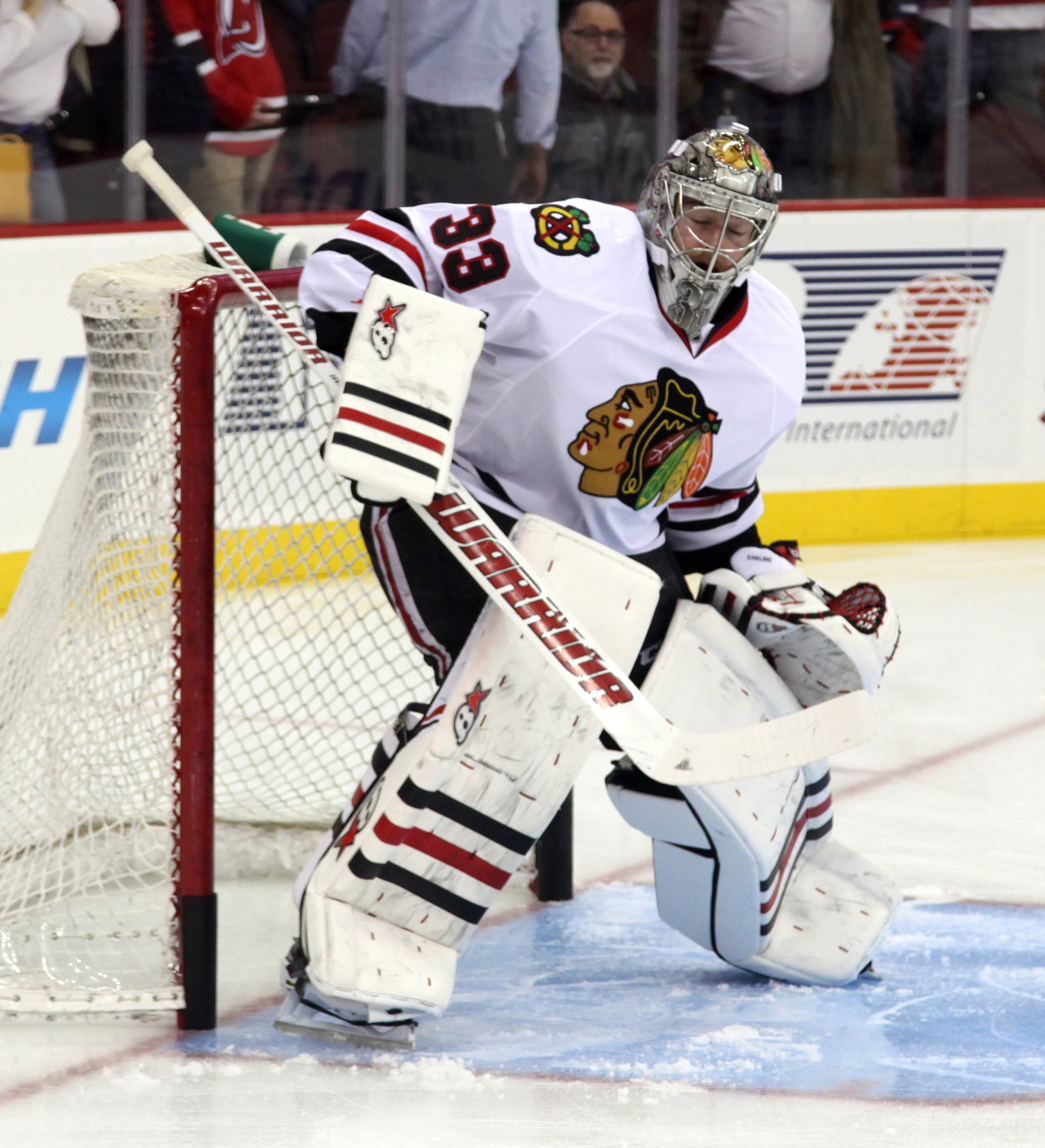
Scott Darling

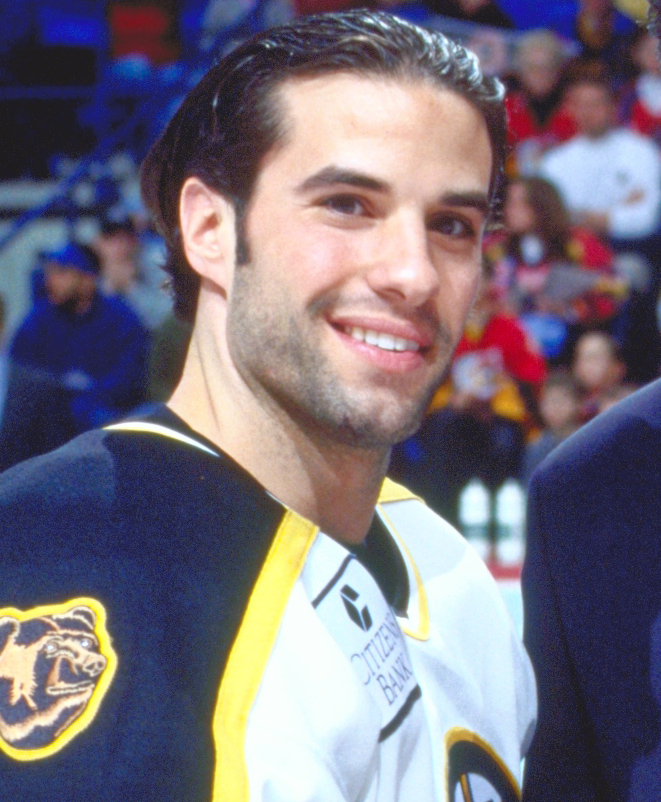
Peter Ferraro

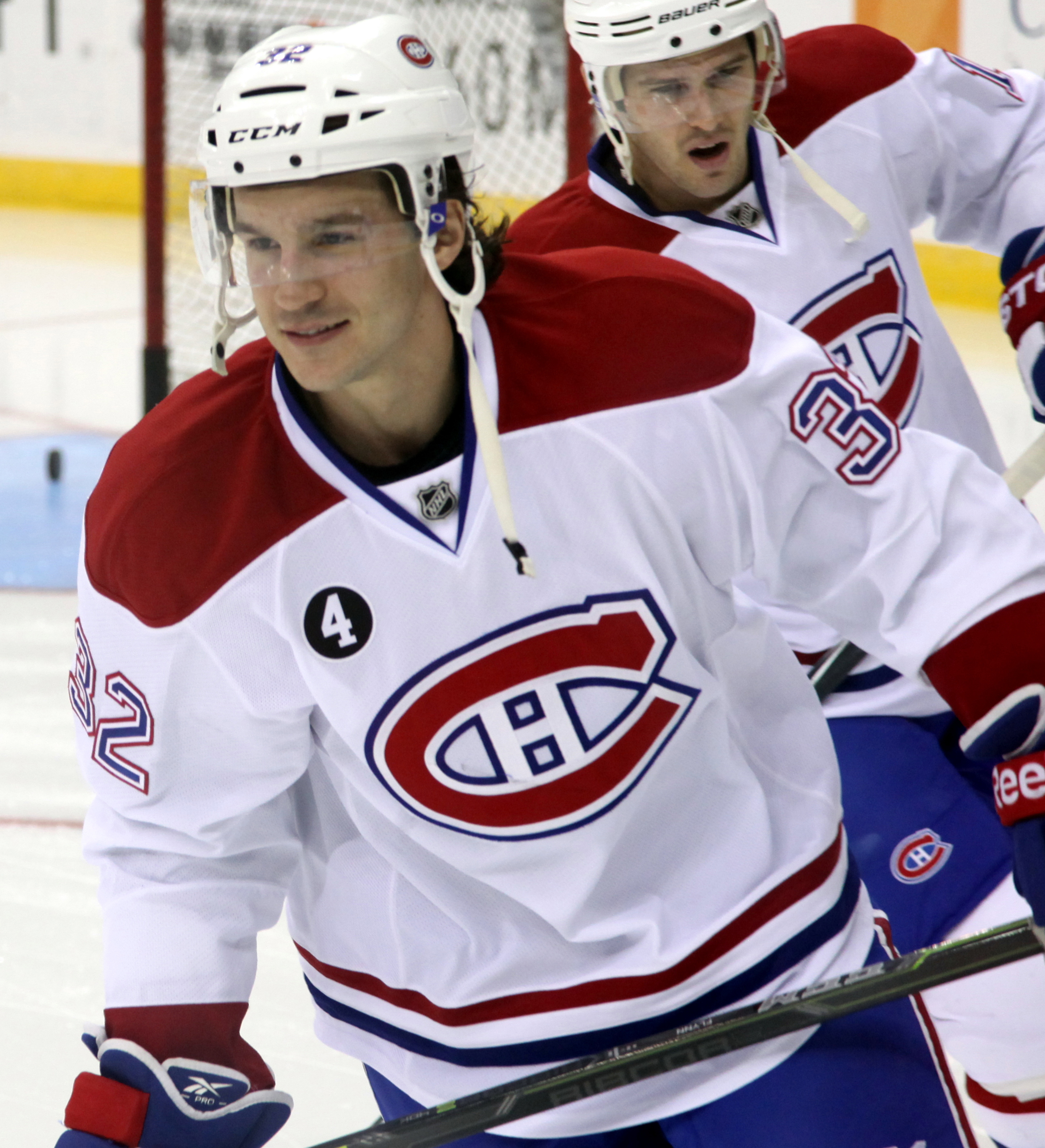
Brian Flynn

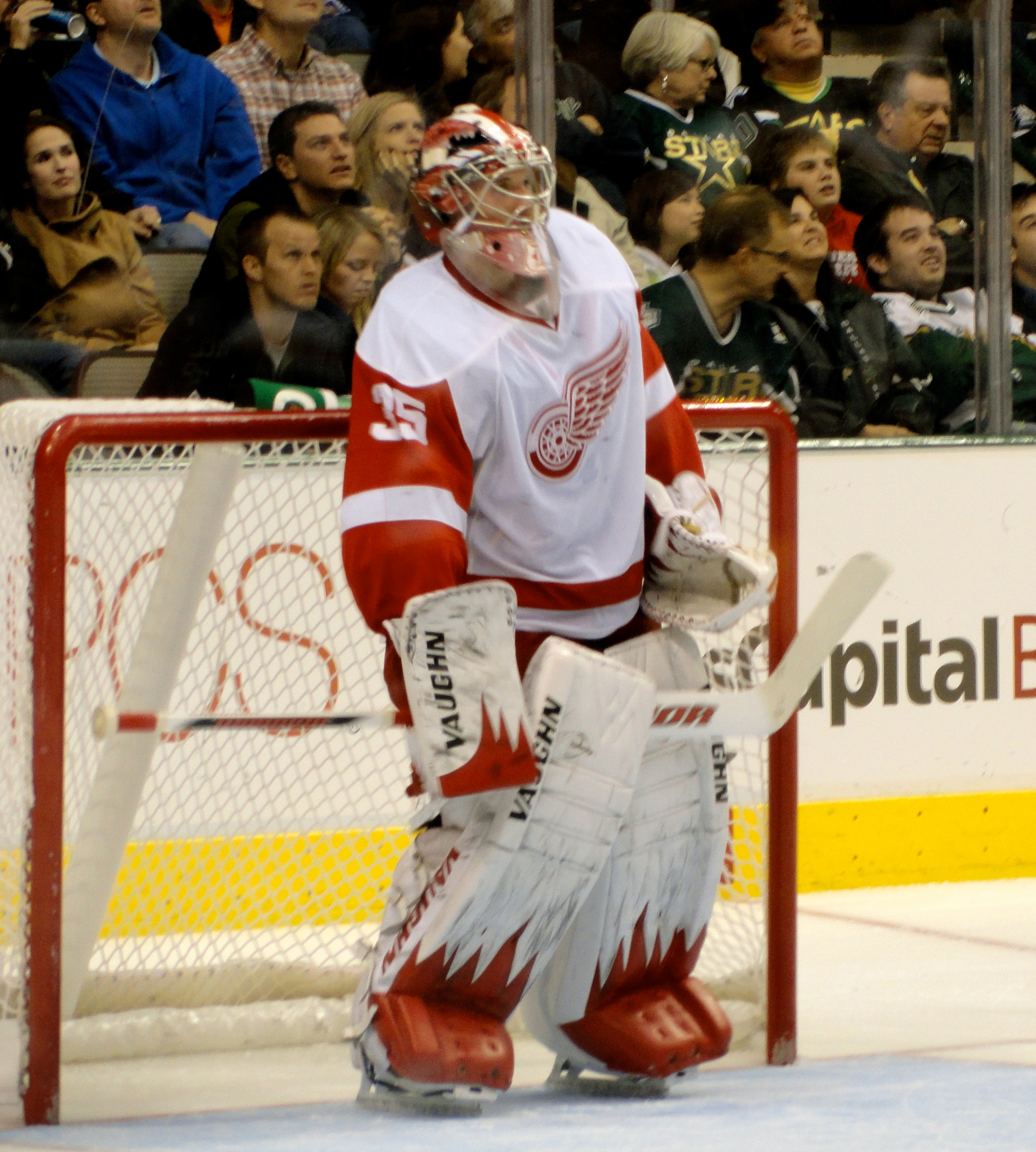
Jimmy Howard

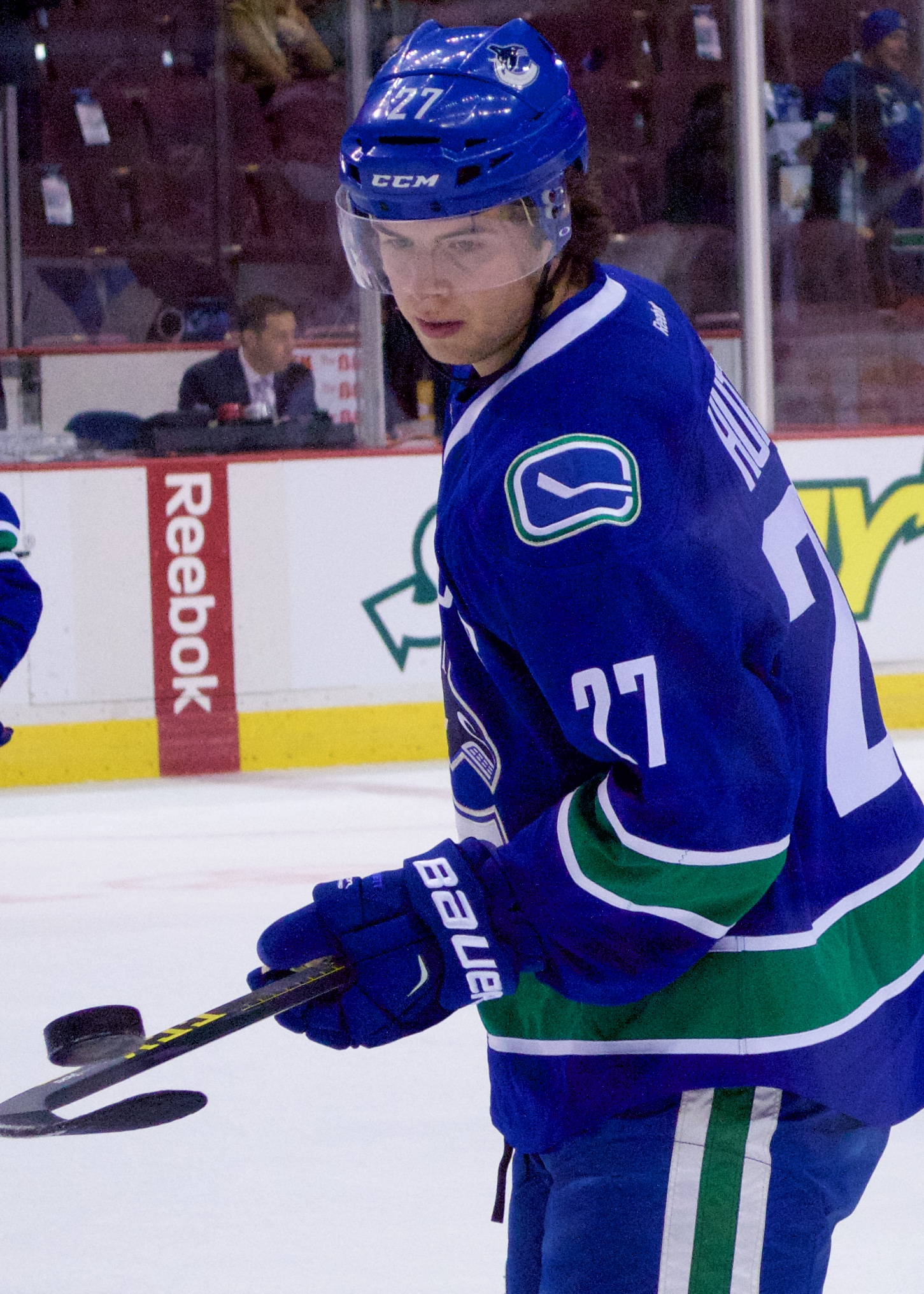
Ben Hutton

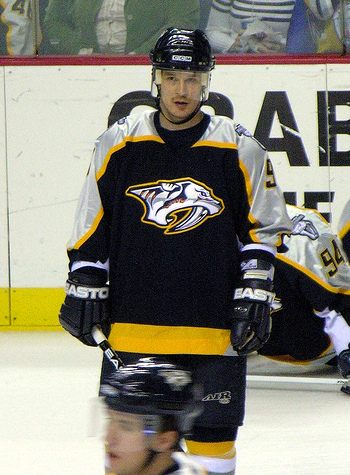
Paul Kariya

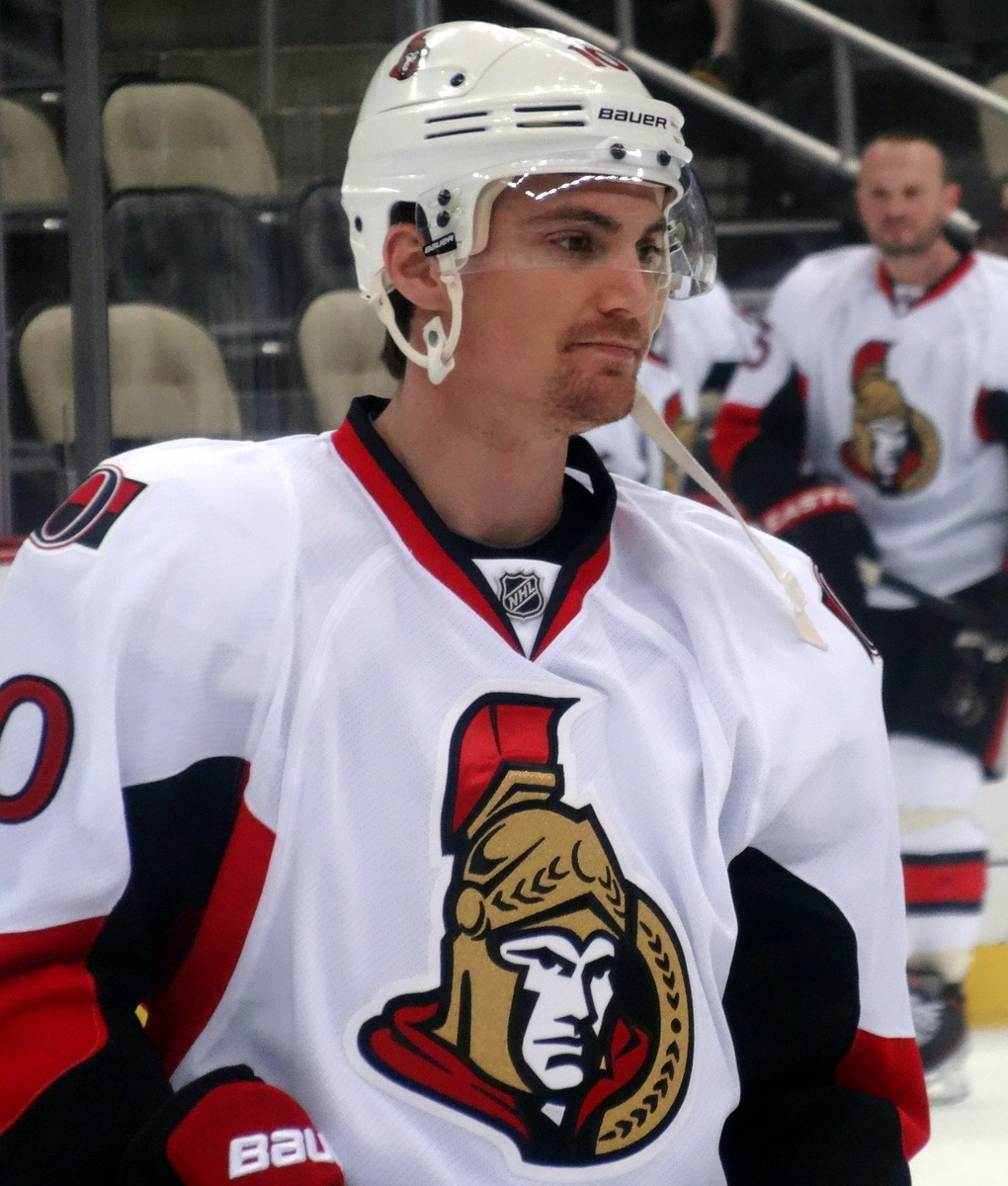
Mike Lundin

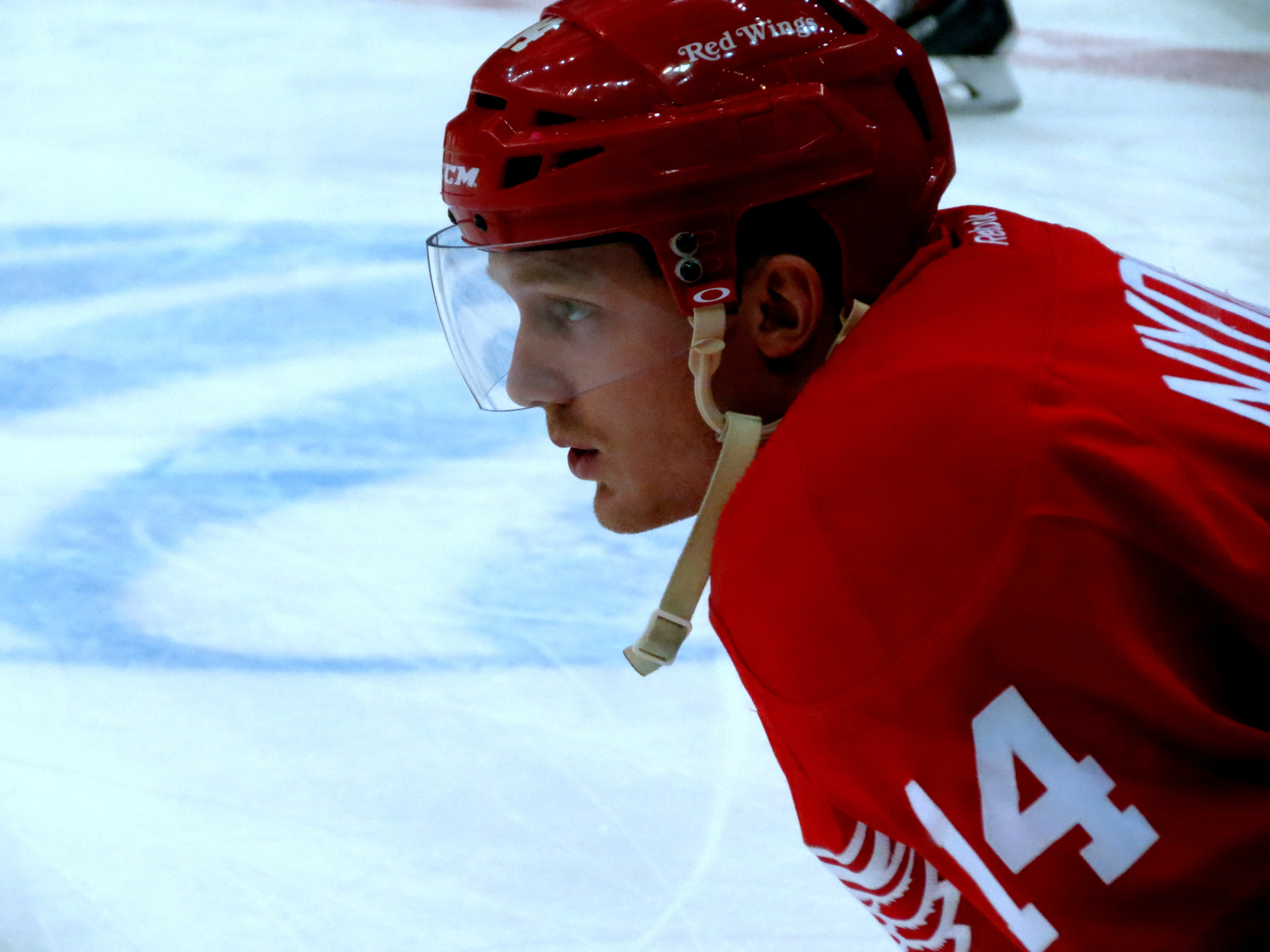
Gustav Nyquist

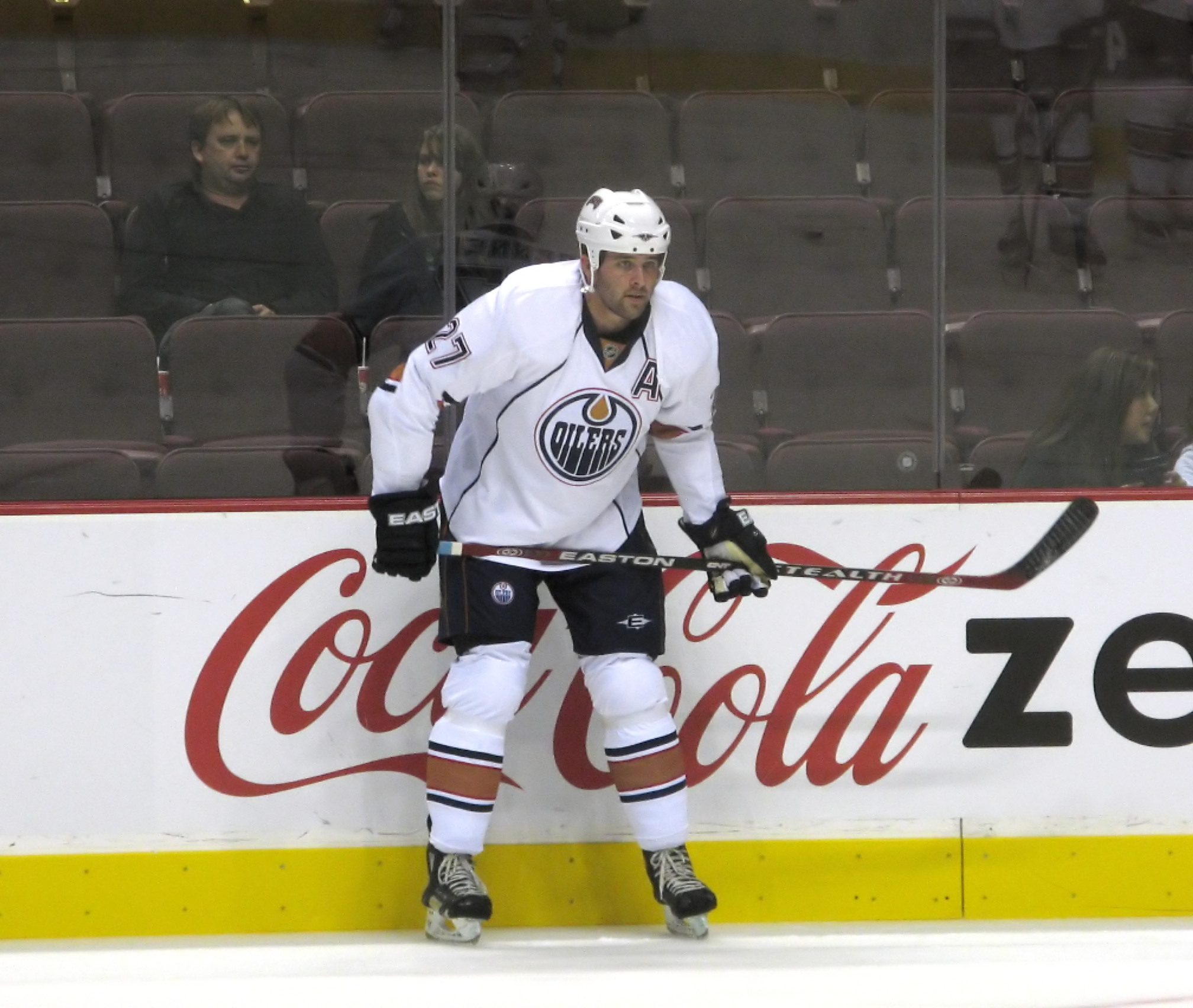
Dustin Penner

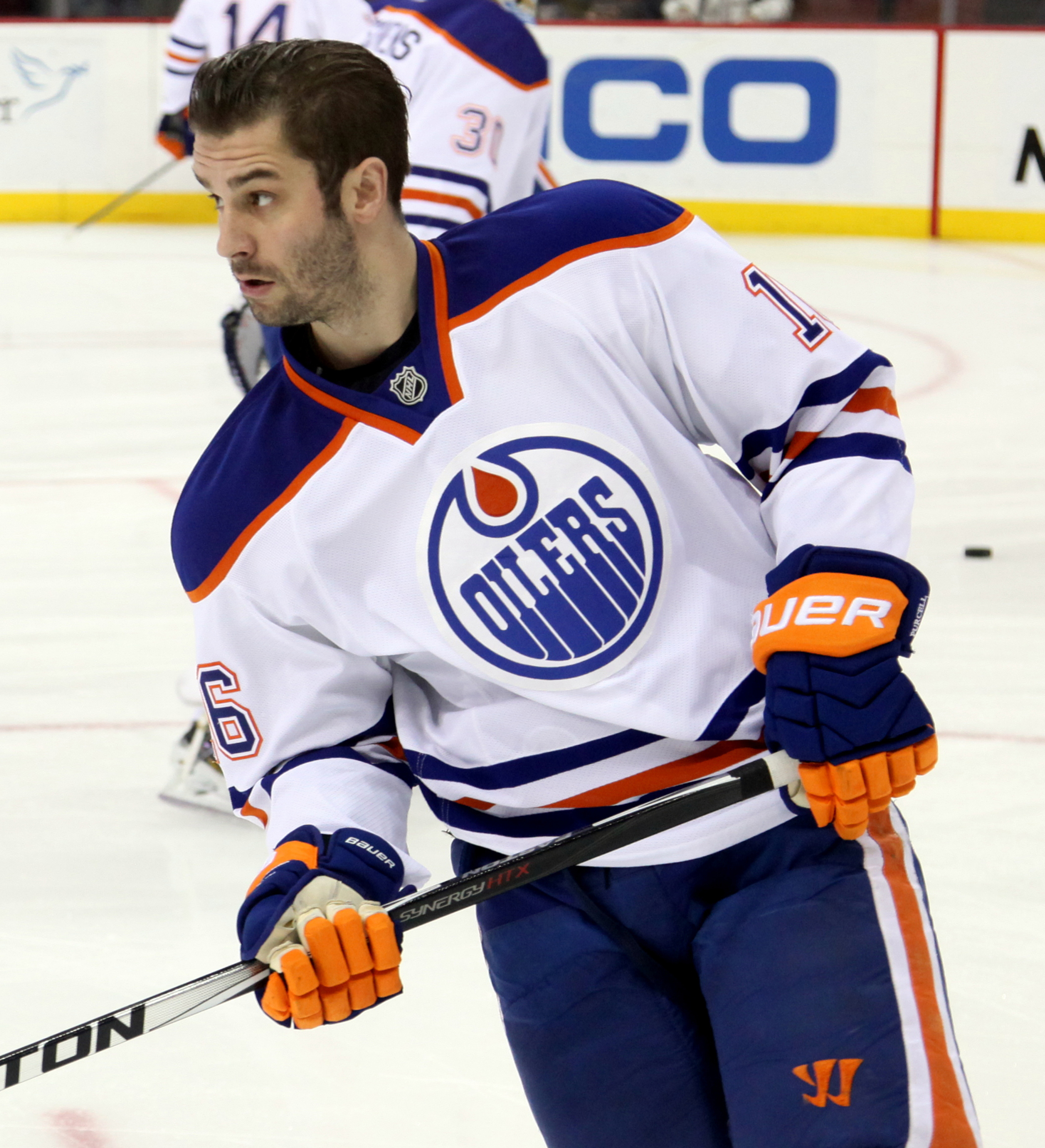
Teddy Purcell

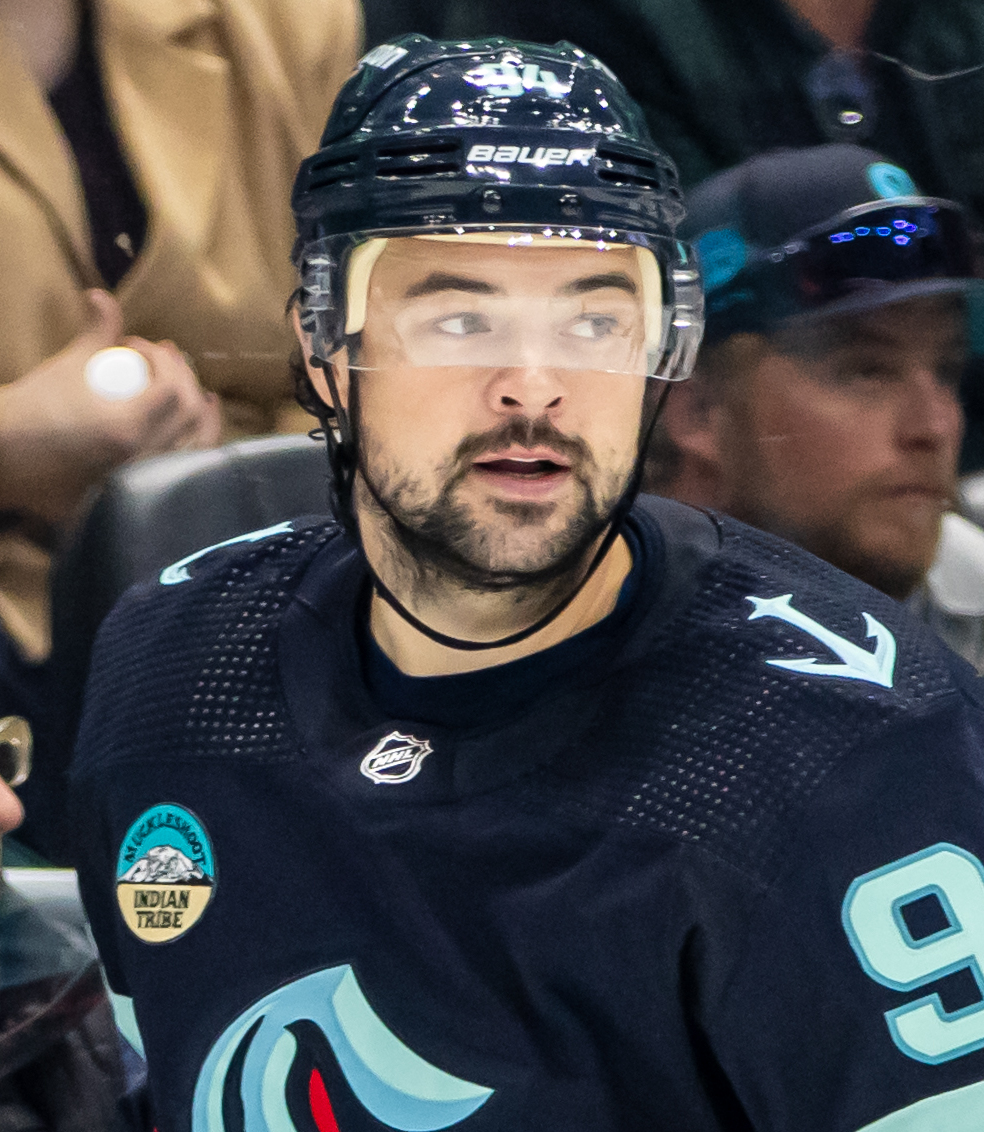
Devin Shore

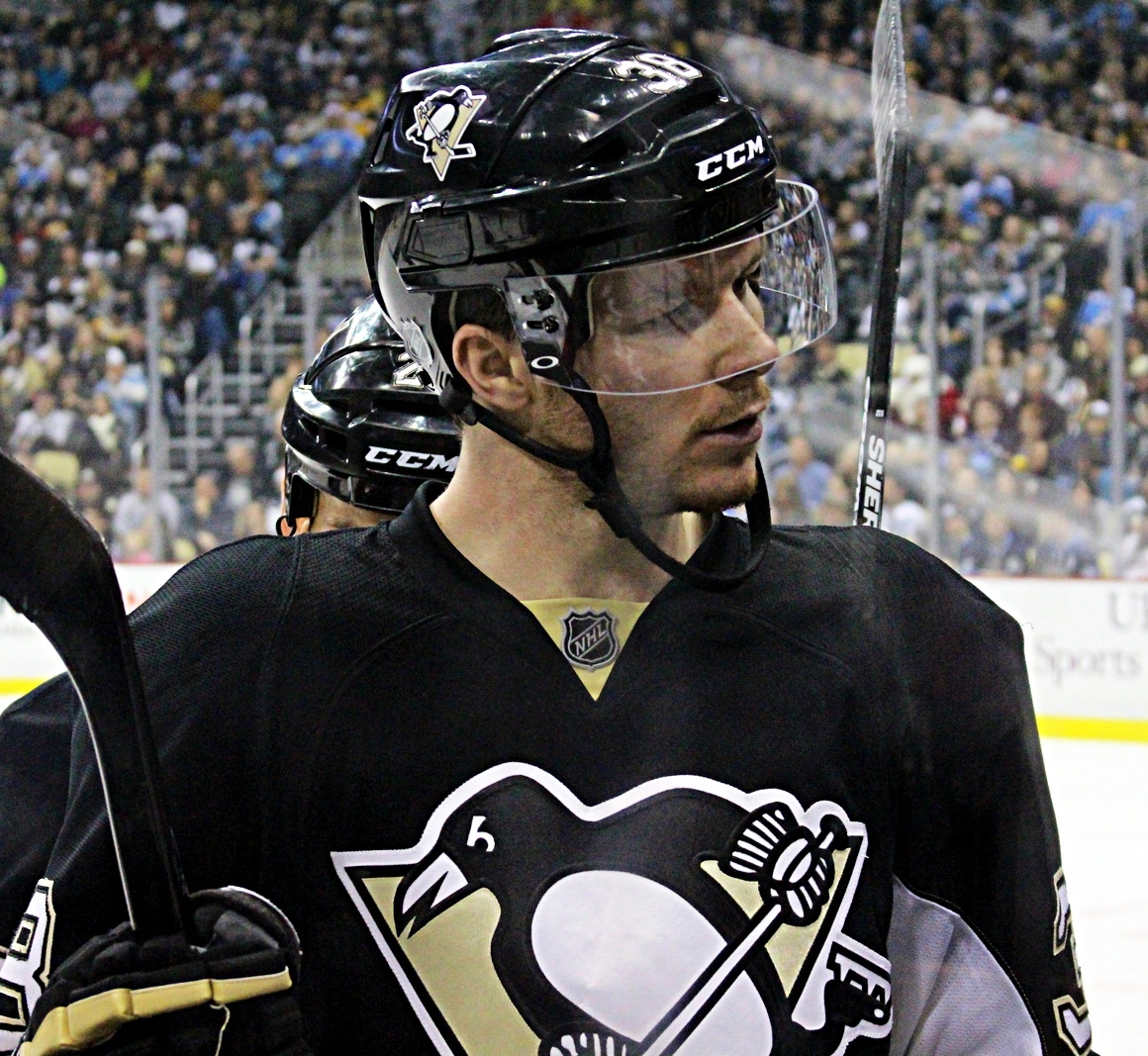
Zach Sill

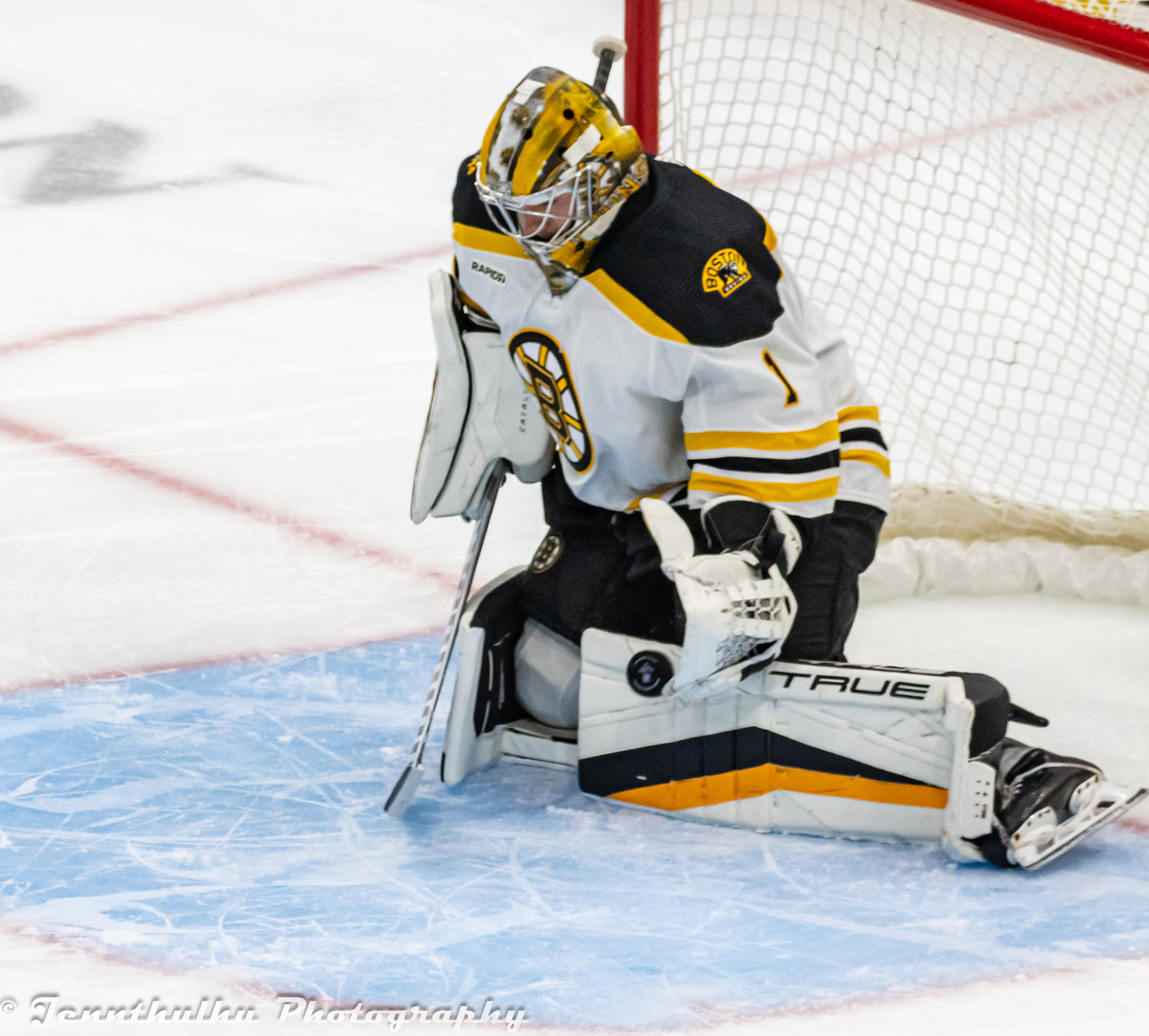
Jeremy Swayman

== Team Scoring Champions ==
Season	Player	GP	G	A	TP
1978–79	Gary Conn	20	19	21	40
1979–80	Gary Conn	31	21	24	45
1980–81	Gary Conn	34	30	33	63
1981–82	Robert Lafleur	29	27	23	50
1982–83	Ray Jacques	29	15	18	33
1983–84	Todd Bjorkstrand	32	15	37	52
1984–85	Ray Jacques	41	14	27	41
1985–86	John McDonald	39	11	24	35
1986–87	Dave Capuano	38	18	41	59
1987–88	Dave Capuano	42	34	51	85
1988–89	Dave Capuano	41	37	30	67
1989–90	Jean-Yves Roy	46	39	26	65
1990–91	Jean-Yves Roy	43	37	45	82
1991–92	Jim Montgomery	37	21	44	65
1992–93	Paul Kariya	39	25	75	100
1993–94	Mike Latendresse	33	20	19	39
1994–95	Jeff Tory	40	13	42	55
1995–96	Shawn Wansborough+	36	27	16	43
1995–96	Dan Shermerhorn+	39	20	23	43
1996–97	Steve Kariya	35	19	31	50
1997–98	Steve Kariya	35	25	25	50
1998–99	Steve Kariya	41	27	38	65
1999-00	Cory Larose	39	15	36	51
2000–01	Martin Kariya	39	12	24	36
2001–02	Niko Dimitrakos	43	20	31	51
2002–03	Martin Kariya	39	14	36	50
2003–04	Colin Shields	44	18	26	44
2004–05	Derek Damon	39	14	13	27
2005–06	Greg Moore	41	28	16	44
2006–07	Josh Soares+	40	20	25	45
2006–07	Michel Levielle+	40	19	26	45
2007–08	Wes Clark	30	10	11	21
2008–09	Gustav Nyquist	38	13	19	32
2009–10	Gustav Nyquist	39	19	42	61
2010–11	Gustav Nyquist	36	18	33	51
2011–12	Spencer Abbott	39	21	41	62
2012–13	Devin Shore	38	6	20	26
2013–14	Devin Shore	35	14	29	43
2014–15	Devin Shore	39	14	21	35
2015–16	Blaine Byron	38	8	16	24
2016–17	Blaine Byron	36	18	23	41
2017-18	Mitchell Fossier	37	12	22	34
2018-19	Mitchell Fossier	36	8	28	36
2019-20	Mitchell Fossier	34	10	32	42
2020-21	Adam Dawe	16	5	9	14
2021-22	Lynden Breen	33	9	16	25
2022-23	Lynden Breen	36	21	15	36
2023-24	Bradly Nadeau	37	19	27	46
2024-25	Harrison Scott	38	18	17	35
2025-26	Brandon Holt	35	6	26	32

The (+) denotes a tie in total points at the end of the season.
