= Greg Moore (ice hockey) =

American ice hockey player & coach (born 1984)

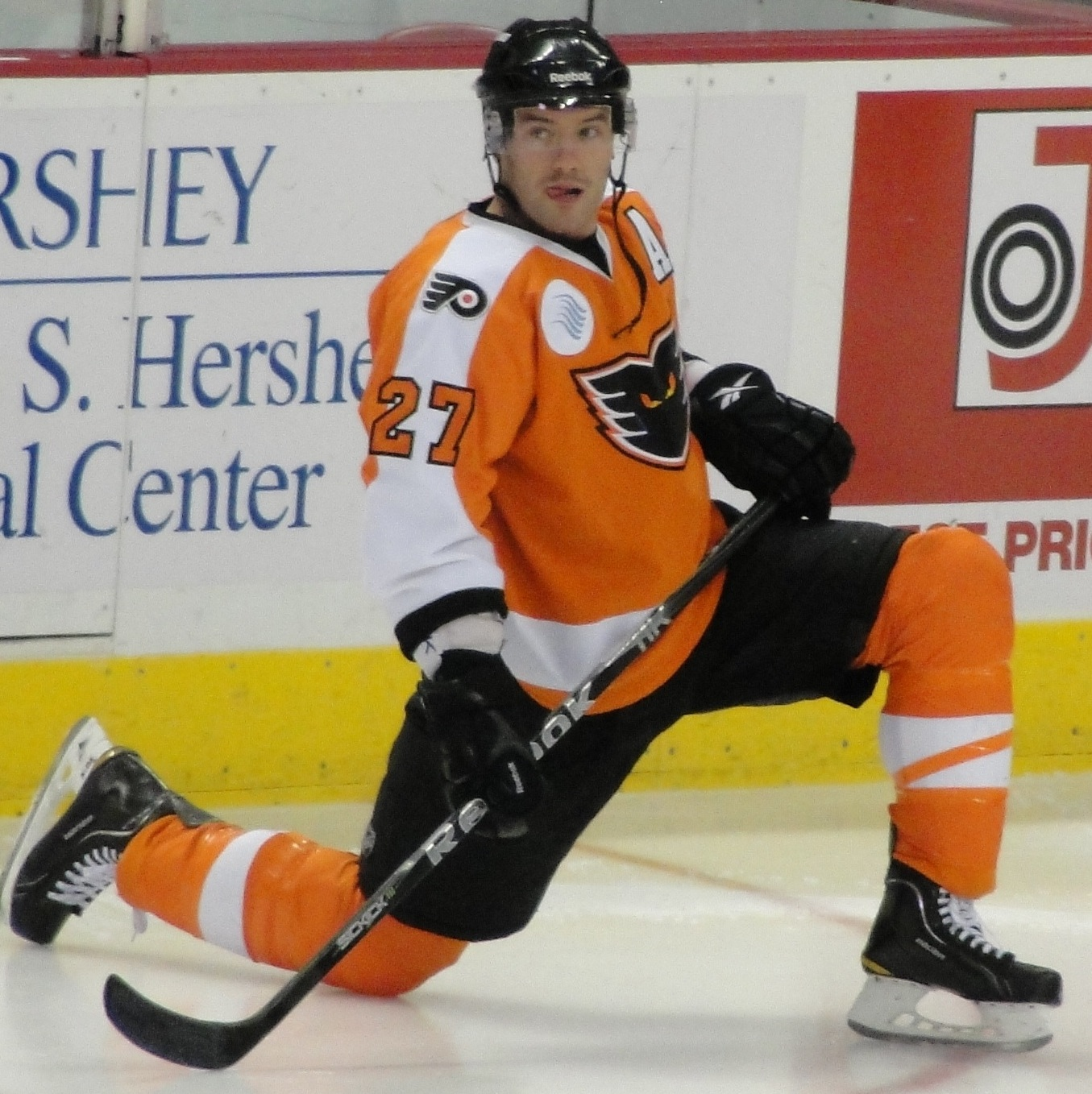
- Moore with the Adirondack Phantoms in 2010
- Born: March 26, 1984 (age 42) Lisbon, Maine, U.S.
- Height: 6 ft 1 in (185 cm)
- Weight: 210 lb (95 kg; 15 st 0 lb)
- Position: Right wing
- Shot: Right
- Played for: New York Rangers; Columbus Blue Jackets; Grizzly Adams Wolfsburg; Augsburger Panther
- Coached for: Chicago Steel; Toronto Marlies
- National team: United States
- NHL draft: 143rd overall, 2003; Calgary Flames
- Playing career: 2006–2015
- Coaching career: 2018–present

Gregory Moore (born March 26, 1984) is an American ice hockey coach and former player. He is currently serving as the head coach to the USA Hockey National Team Development Program. He played in the National Hockey League (NHL) for the New York Rangers and Columbus Blue Jackets and for the Augsburger Panther of the German Deutsche Eishockey Liga (DEL).

In 2018, he was named the head coach of the Chicago Steel in the United States Hockey League (USHL), a Tier I junior league. In 2019, he was named head coach of the Toronto Marlies.

== Playing career ==
Moore was drafted in the fifth round, 143rd overall in the 2003 NHL entry draft by the Calgary Flames. He played his college hockey at the University of Maine.

On March 6, 2004, Moore was acquired by the Rangers, along with Jamie McLennan and Blair Betts, in exchange for Chris Simon and a seventh round choice in the 2004 NHL entry draft.

In the 2007–08 season, Moore made his NHL debut with the Rangers in a 2–1 victory against the Tampa Bay Lightning on November 21, 2007.

On July 6, 2009, Moore signed a one-year contract with the New York Islanders. Moore was then assigned to their affiliate, the Bridgeport Sound Tigers, in the AHL for the beginning of the 2009–10 season. On March 1, 2010, Moore was traded by the Islanders to the Columbus Blue Jackets for Dylan Reese. Initially reassigned to the Blue Jackets AHL affiliate, the Syracuse Crunch, Moore was later recalled to finish the season with Columbus and made his debut in a 3–2 defeat to the Washington Capitals on April 3, 2010.

On July 9, 2010, Moore signed as a free agent to a one-year contract with the Philadelphia Flyers.

On February 28, 2011, Moore was traded by Philadelphia, along with Lewiston Maineiacs player and Flyer prospect, Michael Chaput to Columbus for Tom Sestito.

On July 18, 2011, German professional ice hockey team Augsburger Panther from Augsburg, Bavaria, announced that Moore signed a one-year contract. In his solitary season in 2011–12 with Augsburg, Moore provided 20 goals in 52 games, helping the team to the Qualifying playoff round.

Upon the expiration of his contract with the Panthers, Moore signed a one-year contract with fellow DEL competitor Grizzly Adams Wolfsburg on April 3, 2012. In February 2013 the contract was extended for another year.

Before the 2014–15 season, Moore signed a contract in the Czech 1st Liga with the Piráti Chomutov before returning to Augsburger Panther in Germany.

== Coaching career ==
=== Chicago Steel ===
On June 6, 2018, Moore was hired as the head coach of the USHL Chicago Steel and led them to the Clark Cup Finals in his first year, before starting off the 2019-20 season with a 15-4-1 record.

=== Toronto Marlies ===
On December 1, 2019, Moore was hired by the Toronto Maple Leafs organization to coach the Toronto Marlies. He replaced Sheldon Keefe, who was promoted to serve as the Leafs' head coach. On May 19, 2023, shortly after Rochester swept the Marlies in the Division Finals, the Marlies announced they would not renew the contract of Moore.

== Career statistics ==
=== Regular season and playoffs ===
			Regular season					Playoffs
Season	Team	League	GP	G	A	Pts	PIM	GP	G	A	Pts	PIM
1999–2000	Saint Dominic Academy	HSME	31	32	40	72	—	—	—	—	—	—
2000–01	U.S. NTDP U17	USDP	13	4	6	10	—	—	—	—	—	—
2000–01	U.S. NTDP U18	NAHL	56	8	12	20	22	—	—	—	—	—
2001–02	U.S. NTDP Juniors	USHL	12	2	2	4	4	—	—	—	—	—
2001–02	U.S. NTDP U18	NAHL	6	3	2	5	2	—	—	—	—	—
2001–02	U.S. NTDP U18	USDP	35	8	20	28	14	—	—	—	—	—
2002–03	Maine Black Bears	HE	33	9	7	16	10	—	—	—	—	—
2003–04	Maine Black Bears	HE	39	15	8	23	44	—	—	—	—	—
2004–05	Maine Black Bears	HE	40	14	9	23	16	—	—	—	—	—
2005–06	Maine Black Bears	HE	42	28	17	45	47	—	—	—	—	—
2005–06	Hartford Wolf Pack	AHL	2	1	1	2	2	13	2	5	7	6
2006–07	Hartford Wolf Pack	AHL	79	8	17	25	41	7	0	1	1	4
2007–08	Hartford Wolf Pack	AHL	72	26	40	66	31	5	1	2	3	2
2007–08	New York Rangers	NHL	6	0	0	0	0	—	—	—	—	—
2008–09	Hartford Wolf Pack	AHL	71	23	16	39	28	6	0	2	2	0
2009–10	Bridgeport Sound Tigers	AHL	62	14	17	31	28	—	—	—	—	—
2009–10	Syracuse Crunch	AHL	16	5	5	10	10	—	—	—	—	—
2009–10	Columbus Blue Jackets	NHL	4	0	0	0	0	—	—	—	—	—
2010–11	Adirondack Phantoms	AHL	57	7	13	20	18	—	—	—	—	—
2010–11	Springfield Falcons	AHL	18	2	2	4	4	—	—	—	—	—
2011–12	Augsburger Panther	DEL	52	20	10	30	20	2	1	0	1	0
2012–13	Grizzly Adams Wolfsburg	DEL	50	13	17	30	72	12	4	3	7	8
2013–14	Grizzly Adams Wolfsburg	DEL	2	0	0	0	0	—	—	—	—	—
2014–15	Piráti Chomutov	CZE.2	16	2	4	6	18	—	—	—	—	—
2014–15	Augsburger Panther	DEL	28	4	5	9	53	—	—	—	—	—
AHL totals			377	86	111	197	162	31	3	10	13	12
NHL totals			10	0	0	0	0	—	—	—	—	—
DEL totals			132	37	32	69	145	14	5	3	8	8

=== International ===
Medal record

Representing United States

Ice hockey

IIHF U18 Championships
Gold medal – first place	2002 Piešťany	

IIHF U20 Championships
Gold medal – first place	2004 Helsinki	

Year	Team	Event	Result	GP	G	A	Pts	PIM
2001	United States	U17	1st place, gold medalist(s)	6	2	4	6	2
2002	United States	WJC18	1st place, gold medalist(s)	8	4	4	8	4
2003	United States	WJC	4th	7	0	0	0	0
2004	United States	WJC	1st place, gold medalist(s)	6	0	3	3	2
Junior totals				27	6	11	17	8

== Awards and honors ==
Award	Year
All-Hockey East First Team	2005–06
AHCA East First-Team All-American	2005–06
