= Todd Jackson =

American ice hockey player (born 1981)

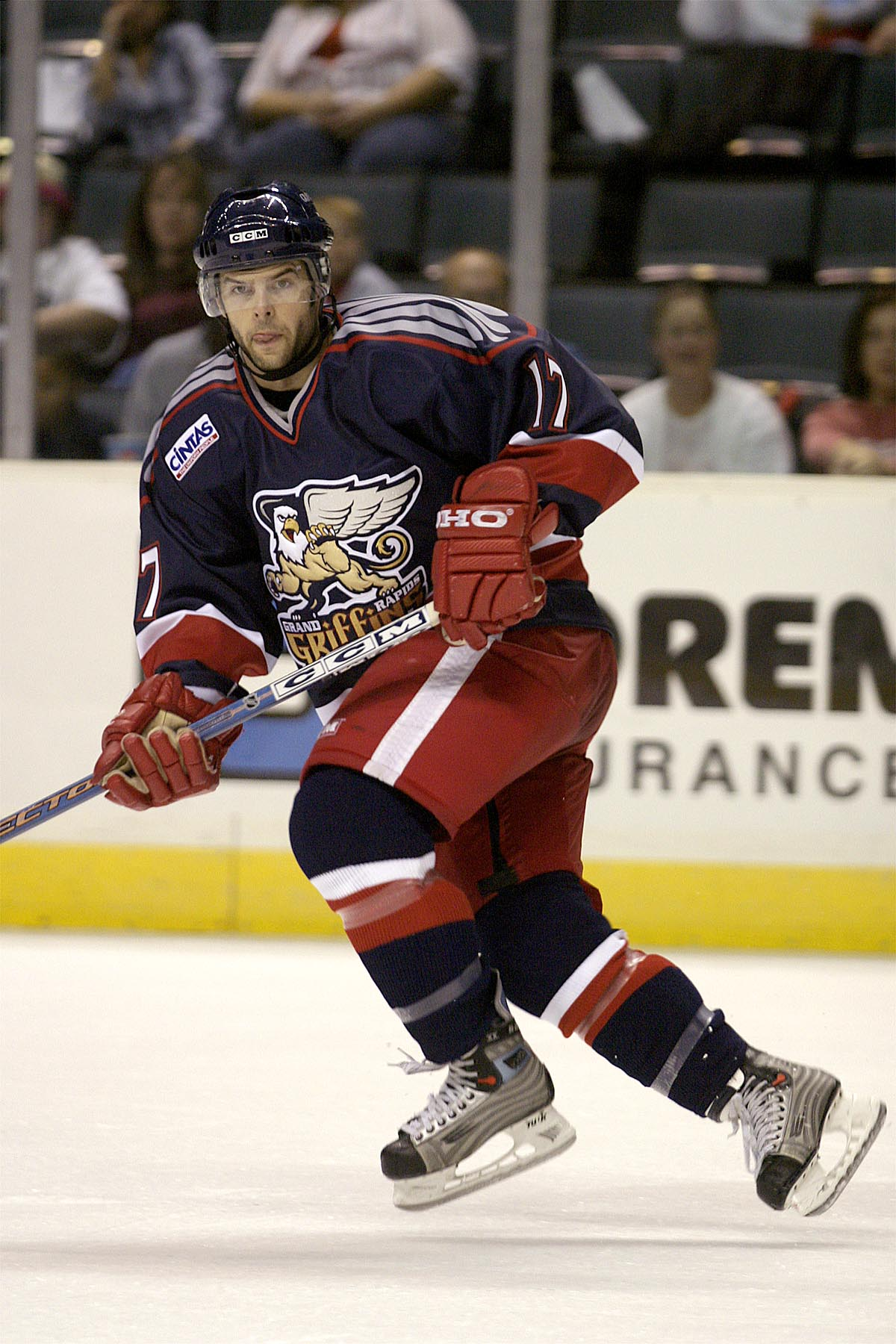
- Jackson with the Grand Rapids Griffins in 2004
- Born: April 10, 1981 (age 45) Cortland, NY, USA
- Height: 5 ft 10 in (178 cm)
- Weight: 181 lb (82 kg; 12 st 13 lb)
- Position: Left wing
- Shot: Right
- Played for: AHL; Grand Rapids Griffins; ECHL; Toledo Storm; Phoenix RoadRunners; Ontario Reign; EIHL; Newcastle Vipers; Italy2; Pergine Valsugana
- NHL draft: 251st overall, 2000; Detroit Red Wings
- Playing career: 2004–2012

Todd Jackson (born April 10, 1981) is an American former professional ice hockey player. He was last playing in Pergine in the Italian 2nd Division. Jackson was selected by the Detroit Red Wings in the 8th round (251st overall) of the 2000 NHL entry draft.

Prior to turning professional, Jackson attended the University of Maine where he played four seasons with the Maine Black Bears men's ice hockey team, scoring 45 goals and 54 assists in 161 games. Jackson was named the Hockey East Best Defensive Forward for the 2002–03 season.

On June 2, 2004, the Detroit Red Wings signed Jackson to a two-year, entry-level contract. However, he never played for the Red Wings or in the National Hockey League.

== Awards and honors ==
Award	Year
College
All-Hockey East Second team	2003–04
AHCA East Second-Team All-American	2003–04

== Career statistics ==
=== Regular season and playoffs ===
			Regular season					Playoffs
Season	Team	League	GP	G	A	Pts	PIM	GP	G	A	Pts	PIM
1998–99	US NTDP U18	USHL	53	11	9	20	56	—	—	—	—	—
1999–2000	US NTDP Juniors	USHL	23	8	6	14	12	—	—	—	—	—
1999–2000	US NTDP U18	NAHL	29	8	10	18	25	—	—	—	—	—
2000–01	University of Maine	HE	39	4	8	12	8	—	—	—	—	—
2001–02	University of Maine	HE	39	7	21	28	10	—	—	—	—	—
2002–03	University of Maine	HE	39	13	13	26	22	—	—	—	—	—
2003–04	University of Maine	HE	44	21	12	33	34	—	—	—	—	—
2004–05	Grand Rapids Griffins	AHL	30	0	2	2	10	—	—	—	—	—
2004–05	Toledo Storm	ECHL	35	12	13	25	24	4	0	0	0	2
2005–06	Grand Rapids Griffins	AHL	5	0	1	1	2	—	—	—	—	—
2005–06	Toledo Storm	ECHL	55	19	31	50	44	13	3	6	9	10
2006–07	Phoenix Roadrunners	ECHL	56	13	21	34	50	4	1	2	3	9
2007–08	Newcastle Vipers	EIHL	43	14	30	44	23	3	1	1	2	0
2008–09	Ontario Reign	ECHL	57	14	15	29	51	7	0	1	1	0
2009–10	Ontario Reign	ECHL	18	2	4	6	4	—	—	—	—	—
2011–12	ASD Hockey Pergine	ITA.2	13	9	7	16	6	1	0	3	3	0
AHL totals			35	0	3	3	12	—	—	—	—	—
ECHL totals			221	60	84	144	173	28	4	9	13	21

=== International ===
Year	Team	Event	GP	G	A	Pts	PIM
1999	United States	WJC18	6	2	1	3	0
Junior totals			6	2	1	3	0

Awards and achievements
Preceded by Mark Mullen	Hockey East Best Defensive Forward; 2003–04	Succeeded by Preston Callander
