= Jay Mazur =

Canadian-born American ice hockey player

- Born: January 22, 1965 (age 61) Hamilton, Ontario, Canada
- Height: 6 ft 1 in (185 cm)
- Weight: 210 lb (95 kg; 15 st 0 lb)
- Position: Right wing
- Shot: Right
- Played for: Vancouver Canucks
- NHL draft: 230th overall, 1983; Vancouver Canucks
- Playing career: 1987–2001

Jay Mazur (born January 22, 1965) is a Canadian-born American former professional ice hockey forward. He played 47 games in the National Hockey League with the Vancouver Canucks between 1988 and 1992, spending the rest of his career in the minor leagues before retiring in 2001.

== Personal life ==
Mazur was born in Hamilton, Ontario and raised in Akron, Ohio. Mazur's father was a petroleum engineer who spent time in both the US and Canada. Mazur was selected by the Vancouver Canucks in the 12th round of the 1983 NHL entry draft from Breck HS in Minnesota. Mazur then spent four years at the University of Maine, where he earned a degree in physical education.

== Playing career ==
Mazur turned pro in 1987 and signed with the Canucks. His first three pro seasons were spent primarily with the Canucks' IHL farm teams where he was a productive scorer, although he did manage to earn two call-ups and gain six games of NHL experience. While his size (6'1" 210 lbs) and scoring touch were attractive to a small Canuck team.

Mazur had a strong training camp in 1990 to crack Vancouver's NHL squad full-time. Unfortunately, though, his season was curtailed by two major injuries which limited him to only 36 games. However, he was productive in his limited action, finishing with 11 goals and 18 points. He also played in all 6 playoff games in Vancouver's opening-round loss to the Los Angeles Kings.

Mazur was again on the Canucks' roster to start the 1991–92 season, although he was seeing limited action as a depth player. Following the team's signing of Russian superstar forward Pavel Bure a month into the season on October 31, Mazur was the odd man out and was reassigned to the AHL.

He spent three more years in Vancouver's farm system before finally parting ways with the Canucks in 1994. He then became something of a hockey nomad, playing for 8 different pro teams in 5 different minor-pro leagues, as well as brief stops in Italy and Germany, before retiring in 2001.

== Post-playing career ==
Following his retirement he returned to Maine, where he currently coaches high-school hockey at Scarborough High School and was a Gym Teacher at Scarborough Middle School. He also works sales part time at Yankee Ford the #1 Ford dealership in Maine!.

== Career statistics ==
=== Regular season and playoffs ===
			Regular season					Playoffs
Season	Team	League	GP	G	A	Pts	PIM	GP	G	A	Pts	PIM
1982–83	Breck School	HS-MN	—	—	—	—	—	—	—	—	—	—
1983–84	University of Maine	ECAC	34	14	9	23	14	—	—	—	—	—
1984–85	University of Maine	ECAC	31	0	6	6	20	—	—	—	—	—
1985–86	University of Maine	ECAC	34	5	7	12	18	—	—	—	—	—
1986–87	University of Maine	ECAC	39	16	10	26	61	3	1	2	3	4
1987–88	Flint Spirits	IHL	43	17	11	28	36	—	—	—	—	—
1987–88	Fredericton Express	AHL	31	14	6	20	28	15	4	2	6	38
1988–89	Milwaukee Admirals	IHL	73	33	31	64	86	11	6	5	11	2
1988–89	Vancouver Canucks	NHL	1	0	0	0	0	—	—	—	—	—
1989–90	Milwaukee Admirals	IHL	70	20	27	47	63	6	3	0	3	6
1989–90	Vancouver Canucks	NHL	5	0	0	0	4	—	—	—	—	—
1990–91	Milwaukee Admirals	IHL	7	2	3	5	21	—	—	—	—	—
1990–91	Vancouver Canucks	NHL	36	11	7	18	14	6	0	1	1	8
1991–92	Milwaukee Admirals	IHL	56	17	20	37	49	5	2	3	5	0
1991–92	Vancouver Canucks	NHL	5	0	0	0	2	—	—	—	—	—
1992–93	Hamilton Canucks	AHL	59	21	17	38	30	—	—	—	—	—
1993–94	Hamilton Canucks	AHL	78	40	55	95	40	4	2	2	4	4
1994–95	Detroit Vipers	IHL	64	23	27	50	64	1	0	1	1	2
1995–96	Tallahassee Tiger Sharks	ECHL	10	7	8	15	6	—	—	—	—	—
1995–96	Rochester Americans	AHL	16	5	2	7	16	—	—	—	—	—
1995–96	Portland Pirates	AHL	38	11	7	18	39	19	3	7	10	19
1996–97	Milano 24	Alps	13	2	4	6	23	—	—	—	—	—
1996–97	EV Duisburg	GER-2	38	28	26	54	34	—	—	—	—	—
1997–98	Pee Dee Pride	ECHL	69	25	33	58	55	8	2	6	8	2
1998–99	Alexandria Warthogs	WPHL	61	22	53	75	12	—	—	—	—	—
1999–00	Alexandria Warthogs	WPHL	47	21	34	55	27	—	—	—	—	—
2000–01	Mohawk Valley Prowlers	UHL	43	15	45	60	12	—	—	—	—	—
2000–01	New Haven Knights	UHL	21	8	15	23	10	—	—	—	—	—
AHL totals			222	91	87	178	153	38	9	11	20	61
IHL totals			313	112	119	231	319	23	11	9	20	10
NHL totals			47	11	7	18	20	6	0	1	1	8
