= André Aubut =

Canadian ice hockey player

- Born: February 3, 1960 Gaspé, Quebec, Canada
- Died: August 1993 (age 33) Montreal, Quebec, Canada
- Height: 5 ft 11 in (180 cm)
- Weight: 185 lb (84 kg; 13 st 3 lb)
- Position: Defenseman
- Shot: Right
- Played for: Maine; Fredericton Express; Oklahoma City Stars
- Playing career: 1978–1982

André Aubut was a Canadian ice hockey defenseman who was an All-American for Maine.

== Career ==
Aubut was a member of the second recruiting class for the Black Bears when they restarted their ice hockey program in the late 1970s. After a good freshman campaign where he was named ECAC 2 rookie of the year, Maine jumped up to Division I. Predictably, the team finished with a losing record, but only by a few games. Maine performed rather well as a new entry into ECAC Hockey and Aubut became the program's first All-American in 1980. His numbers improved and nearly equaled what he scored as a freshman the next season as Maine finished tied for 5th in the conference and made their first conference tournament at the D-I level. With so many players from the initial class graduating after 1981, the team tumbled down the standings and ended up last in their conference. While Aubut was still a promising prospect, he played just a few games for minor professional clubs before retiring. In April 1993, while playing pickup hockey in Montreal, Aubut suffered a freak injury that left him paralyzed. He died in August at Sacré-Coeur Hospital in Montreal.

In 1988, Aubut was inducted into the Maine Athletics Hall of Fame, the first ice hockey player so honored. He also received the most votes for the Black Bears' first All-decade team. As of 2021, Aubus is still the Black Bears all-time leader in goals (tied) and points by a defenseman.

== Statistics ==
=== Regular season and playoffs ===
			Regular Season					Playoffs
Season	Team	League	GP	G	A	Pts	PIM	GP	G	A	Pts	PIM
1976–77	Laval National	QMJHL	18	0	1	1	38	—	—	—	—	—
1978–79	Maine	ECAC 2	—	10	35	45	—	—	—	—	—	—
1979–80	Maine	ECAC Hockey	32	6	22	28	42	—	—	—	—	—
1980–81	Maine	ECAC Hockey	34	11	32	43	47	—	—	—	—	—
1981–82	Maine	ECAC Hockey	29	5	14	19	26	—	—	—	—	—
1981–82	Fredericton Express	AHL	1	0	0	0	0	—	—	—	—	—
1981–82	Oklahoma City Stars	CHL	6	0	0	0	4	—	—	—	—	—
NCAA totals			—	32	103	135	—	—	—	—	—	—

== Awards and honors ==
Award	Year
All-ECAC 2 First Team	1978–79
All-ECAC Hockey First Team	1979–80
AHCA East All-American	1979–80
All-ECAC Hockey Second Team	1980–81
