= Michel Léveillé =

Canadian ice hockey player

- Born: April 3, 1981 (age 45) Lévis, Quebec, Canada
- Height: 5 ft 9 in (175 cm)
- Weight: 181 lb (82 kg; 12 st 13 lb)
- Position: Center
- Shot: Left
- Played for: Toronto Marlies; Columbia Inferno; Manchester Monarchs; Charlotte Checkers; Heilbronner Falken; Saint-Georges Cool FM 103.5
- Playing career: 2003–2014

Michel Léveillé is a Canadian ice hockey coach and former center who was a two-time All-American for Maine.

== Career ==
Léveillé was a late-blooming junior player, not participating in a high-level league until he was 19. In his final season of junior eligibility, Léveillé's point total exploded and he averaged more than two points per game with the Nanaimo Clippers. Léveillé was forced to play senior hockey for a year before he could join the ice hockey team at Maine, but his freshman year was well worth the wait. He was nearly a point-per-game player for the year and was named the Hockey East Rookie of the Year. He helped the team finish second in the conference and then capture the Hockey East Championship. Maine received the #3 overall seed and marched through the NCAA Tournament. Léveillé's only goal was an important one as it tied a game late and allowed the Black Bears to overcome an early deficit to Harvard. The team reached the championship game for the 5th time in program history, but the offense failed and they fell 0–1 to Denver.

With Léveillé already being 23 at the start of his sophomore season (older than some seniors), he was named as an alternate captain. In year two, he produced twice as many goals, but the team's performance decreased as a result, and he produced less points. The Black Bears recovered in 2006 and Léveillé averaged more than point per game. He was named to the All-American team and pushed the team back up to a 2nd-place finish in Hockey East. Maine had another successful run in the NCAA Tournament, reaching their 10th Frozen Four. Léveillé was named team captain in his final year and was again an All-American. The team had mixed results in postseason play but did return to the Frozen Four. After Maine was eliminated, Léveillé finished the year with the Toronto Marlies.

For Léveillé's first full season as a professional, he spent most of his time in the AHL but couldn't establish himself as a consistent scorer. After getting demoted to the ECHL the following year, he spent the entire 2010 season at the AA-level. After the season, he travelled to Germany and played three seasons in the 2nd national league. In 2013 Léveillé returned to Quebec and played one season for a low-level pro league before hanging up his skates.

Léveillé began his coaching career the following season, working for the North American Hockey Academy for two years. In 2017 he returned to Maine and became a coach for the Maine Wild, a youth hockey organization.

== Career statistics ==
=== Regular season and playoffs ===
			Regular season					Playoffs
Season	Team	League	GP	G	A	Pts	PIM	GP	G	A	Pts	PIM
1999–00	Cégep Lévis-Lauzon Faucons	QCMAA	32	31	48	79	50	—	—	—	—	—
2000–01	Nanaimo Clippers	BCHL	45	22	27	49	63	7	5	3	8	10
2001–02	Nanaimo Clippers	BCHL	52	33	75	108	56	—	—	—	—	—
2002–03	Lévis Canonniers	QSCHL	9	5	8	13	10	—	—	—	—	—
2003–04	Maine	Hockey East	43	6	34	40	42	—	—	—	—	—
2004–05	Lévis Canonniers	QSCHL	1	0	0	0	0	—	—	—	—	—
2004–05	Maine	Hockey East	33	12	12	24	55	—	—	—	—	—
2005–06	Maine	Hockey East	37	16	24	40	46	—	—	—	—	—
2006–07	Maine	Hockey East	40	19	26	45	69	—	—	—	—	—
2006–07	Toronto Marlies	AHL	3	2	0	2	2	—	—	—	—	—
2007–08	Columbia Inferno	ECHL	4	1	4	5	4	—	—	—	—	—
2007–08	Toronto Marlies	AHL	41	9	3	12	14	11	1	0	1	4
2008–09	Manchester Monarchs	AHL	20	1	6	7	11	—	—	—	—	—
2008–09	Charlotte Checkers	ECHL	40	15	22	37	46	6	3	5	8	8
2009–10	Charlotte Checkers	ECHL	67	17	49	66	85	10	1	7	8	8
2010–11	Heilbronner Falken	Bundesliga	48	17	33	50	70	4	1	4	5	6
2011–12	Heilbronner Falken	Bundesliga	29	17	13	30	89	7	4	3	7	16
2012–13	Heilbronner Falken	Bundesliga	42	18	28	46	56	5	1	1	2	6
2013–14	Saint-Georges Cool FM 103.5	LNAH	30	17	23	40	10	3	0	0	0	2
BCHL totals			97	55	102	157	119	7	5	3	8	10
NCAA totals			153	53	96	149	212	—	—	—	—	—
ECHL totals			111	33	75	108	135	16	4	12	16	16
AHL totals			64	12	9	21	27	11	1	0	1	4
Bundesliga totals			119	52	74	126	215	16	6	8	14	28

== Awards and honors ==
Award	Year
All-Hockey East Rookie Team	2003–04
All-Hockey East Second Team	2005–06
AHCA East Second-Team All-American	2005–06
All-Hockey East First Team	2006–07
AHCA East First-Team All-American	2006–07

Awards and achievements
Preceded by Jimmy Howard	Hockey East Rookie of the Year; 2003–04	Succeeded by Peter Vetri
