= Prestin Ryan =

Canadian ice hockey player

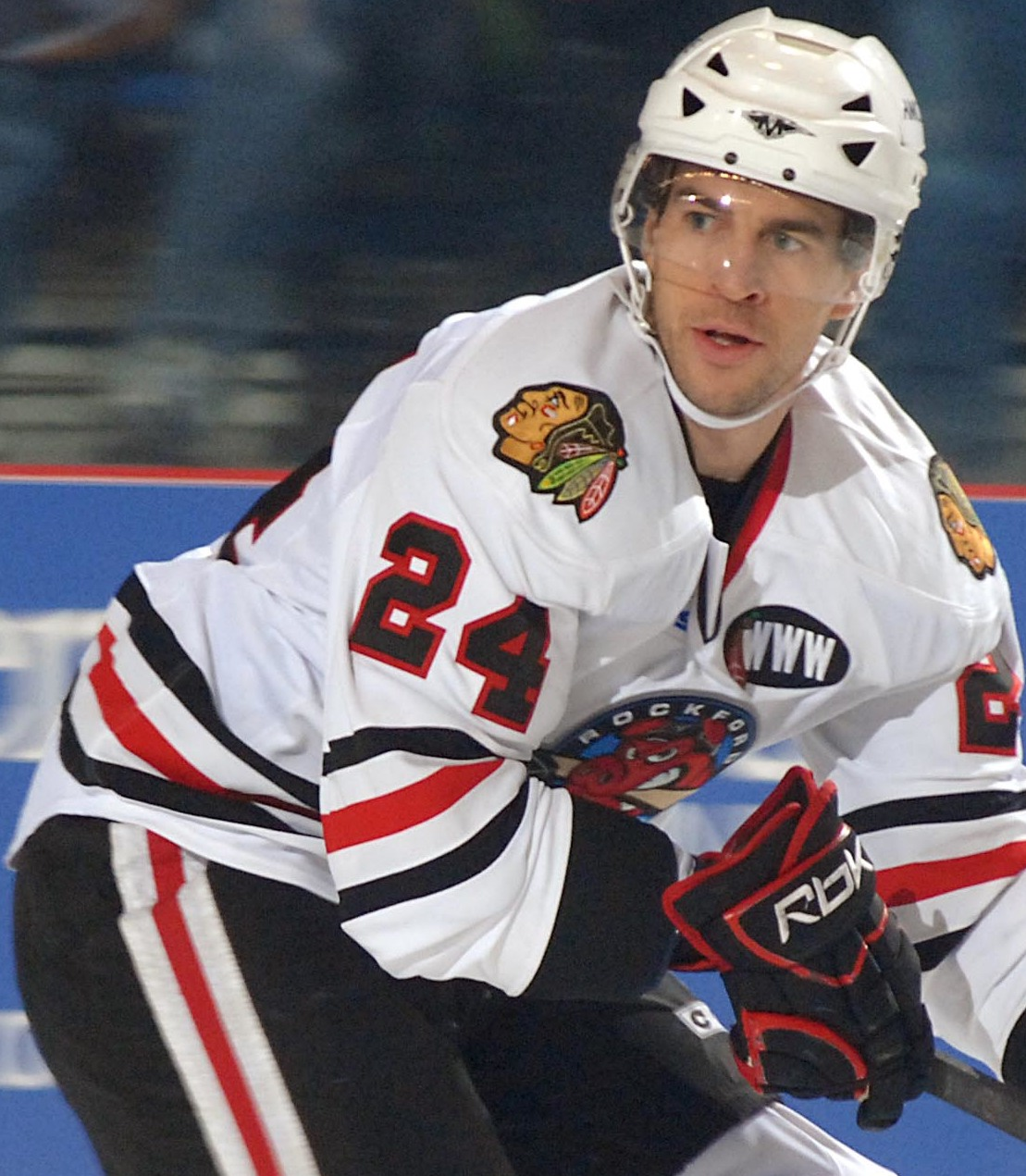
- Ryan with the Rockford IceHogs in 2007
- Born: June 29, 1980 (age 45) Arcola, Saskatchewan, Canada
- Height: 6 ft 0 in (183 cm)
- Weight: 190 lb (86 kg; 13 st 8 lb)
- Position: Defence
- Shot: Left
- Played for: Vancouver Canucks; Adler Mannheim; Iserlohn Roosters; ERC Ingolstadt
- NHL draft: Undrafted
- Playing career: 2004–2013

Prestin Ryan (born June 29, 1980) is a Canadian former professional ice hockey defenceman who played one game for the Vancouver Canucks of the National Hockey League (NHL).

== Playing career ==
=== Amateur ===
Born in Arcola, Saskatchewan, Prestin Ryan played for the Yorkton Mallers in the SMAAAHL. He spent three seasons with the Estevan Bruins of the SJHL. While playing in the SJHL, he was recruited to play hockey at the University of Maine. Ryan spent four seasons playing for the Black Bears in the Hockey East conference. He picked up several NCAA and conference honours while there. After playing his senior season, Ryan turned pro for the 2004–05 season.

=== Professional ===
He started his professional career with the Syracuse Crunch of the AHL. He was initially signed by the Columbus Blue Jackets. In the 2005–06 season, Ryan made his NHL debut, playing in one game, for the Vancouver Canucks. After his second season within the Canucks organization he joined the Chicago Blackhawks and played the 2007–08 season in the AHL with affiliate, the Rockford IceHogs.

A free agent, on November 21, 2008 he signed a contract with Adler Mannheim of the DEL. Ryan left after just six months on May 3, 2009 and signed with League rival ERC Ingolstadt. In the 2009–10 season, Ryan produced his highest totals in the DEL with 7 goals and 27 points in 47 games. On August 26, 2010, the Canadian was on the move again and signed with the Iserlohn Roosters, where he replaced the tryout player David Walker.

After one season away, on April 4, 2011, Ryan returned to sign a one-year contract with Ingolstadt.

== Career statistics ==
			Regular season					Playoffs
Season	Team	League	GP	G	A	Pts	PIM	GP	G	A	Pts	PIM
2001–02	University of Maine	HE	39	6	9	15	91	—	—	—	—	—
2002–03	University of Maine	HE	37	1	8	9	120	—	—	—	—	—
2003–04	University of Maine	HE	43	4	18	22	148	—	—	—	—	—
2003–04	Syracuse Crunch	AHL	—	—	—	—	—	3	0	0	0	2
2004–05	Syracuse Crunch	AHL	59	3	6	9	161	—	—	—	—	—
2005–06	Manitoba Moose	AHL	64	11	12	23	63	13	1	1	2	25
2005–06	Vancouver Canucks	NHL	1	0	0	0	2	—	—	—	—	—
2006–07	Manitoba Moose	AHL	58	5	16	21	125	13	2	3	5	33
2007–08	Rockford IceHogs	AHL	44	7	17	24	117	—	—	—	—	—
2008–09	Adler Mannheim	DEL	16	3	3	6	18	9	1	1	2	18
2009–10	ERC Ingolstadt	DEL	47	7	20	27	56	10	1	3	4	24
2010–11	Iserlohn Roosters	DEL	51	2	16	18	124	—	—	—	—	—
2011–12	ERC Ingolstadt	DEL	48	2	9	11	64	3	0	0	0	20
2012–13	Mora IK	Allsvenskan	11	1	2	3	36	—	—	—	—	—
NHL totals			1	0	0	0	2	—	—	—	—	—

== Awards and honours ==
Award	Year
All-Hockey East Second Team	2003–04
AHCA East Second-Team All-American	2003–04
Hockey East All-Tournament Team	2004
All-NCAA All-Tournament Team	2004

- 1998 - SJHL All Rookie Team
- 2004 - Hockey East Best Defensive Defenseman (co-winner w/ Andrew Alberts)

== See also ==
- List of players who played only one game in the NHL

Awards and achievements
Preceded by Cliff Loya	Hockey East Best Defensive Defenseman; 2003–04 (shared with Andrew Alberts)	Succeeded by Tim Judy
