= 2005 Hockey East men's ice hockey tournament =

2005 Hockey East Men's ice hockey tournament
- Dates: March 10–19, 2005
- Teams: 8
- Finals site: Fleet Center; Boston, Massachusetts
- Champions: Boston College (6th title)
- Winning coach: Jerry York (4th title)
- MVP: Brian Boyle (Boston College)
- Hockey East Men's Ice Hockey Tournaments

The 2005 Hockey East Men's Ice Hockey Tournament was the 21st tournament in the history of the conference. It was played between March 10 and March 19, 2005. Quarterfinal games were played at home team campus sites, while the final four games were played at the Fleet Center in Boston, Massachusetts, the home venue of the NHL's Boston Bruins. By winning the tournament Boston College received the Hockey East's automatic bid to the 2005 NCAA Division I Men's Ice Hockey Tournament.

== Format ==
The tournament featured three rounds of play. The team that finishes ninth in the conference is not eligible for tournament play. In the first round, the first and eighth seeds, the second and seventh seeds, the third seed and sixth seeds, and the fourth seed and fifth seeds played a best-of-three with the winner advancing to the semifinals. In the semifinals, the highest and lowest seeds and second highest and second lowest seeds play a single-elimination game, with the winner advancing to the championship game. The tournament champion receives an automatic bid to the 2005 NCAA Division I Men's Ice Hockey Tournament.

== Conference standings ==
Note: GP = Games played; W = Wins; L = Losses; T = Ties; PTS = Points; GF = Goals For; GA = Goals Against

2004–05 Hockey East standings
| | Conference | | | | | | | Overall | | | | | |
| | GP | W | L | T | PTS | GF | GA | GP | W | L | T | GF | GA |
|---|---|---|---|---|---|---|---|---|---|---|---|---|---|
| #7 Boston College†* | 24 | 14 | 3 | 7 | 35 | 78 | 47 | 40 | 26 | 7 | 7 | 130 | 79 |
| #12 Boston University | 24 | 15 | 5 | 4 | 34 | 76 | 54 | 41 | 23 | 14 | 4 | 111 | 101 |
| #8 New Hampshire | 24 | 15 | 5 | 4 | 34 | 90 | 59 | 42 | 26 | 11 | 5 | 166 | 114 |
| #11 Maine | 24 | 13 | 6 | 5 | 31 | 75 | 47 | 40 | 20 | 13 | 7 | 124 | 79 |
| Massachusetts–Lowell | 24 | 11 | 10 | 3 | 25 | 76 | 66 | 36 | 20 | 12 | 4 | 120 | 96 |
| Northeastern | 24 | 10 | 10 | 4 | 24 | 66 | 58 | 38 | 15 | 18 | 5 | 100 | 106 |
| Providence | 24 | 6 | 14 | 4 | 16 | 54 | 73 | 37 | 12 | 21 | 4 | 85 | 108 |
| Massachusetts | 24 | 6 | 16 | 2 | 14 | 48 | 96 | 38 | 13 | 23 | 2 | 86 | 134 |
| Merrimack | 24 | 1 | 22 | 1 | 3 | 41 | 104 | 36 | 8 | 26 | 2 | 85 | 146 |
Championship: Boston College † indicates conference regular season champion * indicates conference tournament champion Final rankings: USA Today/USA Hockey Magazine Top 15 Poll

== Bracket ==
Quarterfinals; March 10–13
1 | Boston College | 3* | 5 | –
8 | Massachusetts | 2 | 1 | –
2 | Boston University | 1 | 2 | 2
7 | Providence | 4 | 0 | 0
(Pairings are reseeded after the first round)
3 | New Hampshire | 6 | 4 | –
6 | Northeastern | 1 | 0 | –
4 | Maine | 7 | 5 | –
5 | Massachusetts-Lowell | 2 | 1 | –

Semifinals; March 18
1 | Boston College | 2**
4 | Maine | 1
2 | Boston University | 2
3 | New Hampshire | 5

Championship; March 19
1 | Boston College | 3
3 | New Hampshire | 1

Note: * denotes overtime period(s)

=== Quarterfinals ===
==== (1) Boston College vs. (8) Massachusetts ====
| March 11 | Boston College | 3 – 2 | OT | Massachusetts | Conte Forum | Recap |
| No Scoring | | First period | | No scoring |
| (Spina) Patrick Eaves - 18:23 | | Second period | | 02:02 - Obi Aduba (Solon, Jarman); 04:19 - P. J. Fenton (Burto, Degon) |
| (Eaves, Spina) Brian Boyle - PP - 02:52 | | Third period | | No scoring |
| (Harrold) Stephen Gionta - GW - 10:32 | | First overtime period | | No scoring |
| ( 20 saves / 22 shots ) Matti Kaltianen | | Goalie stats | | Gabe Winer ( 39 saves / 42 shots ) |

| March 12 | Boston College | 5 – 1 | Massachusetts | Conte Forum | Recap |
| (Boyle, Eaves) Ryan Shannon - PP - 14:18 (Shannon, Alberts) Patrick Eaves - GW SH - 16:31 | | First period | 00:42 - Matt Burto |
| (Eaves, Shannon) Joe Rooney - PP - 04:45 | | Second period | No scoring |
| (Rooney, Gionta) Ryan Murphy - 08:20 (Boyle, Alberts) Joe Rooney - PP - 11:08 | | Third period | No scoring |
| ( 16 saves / 17 shots ) Cory Schneider | | Goalie stats | Gabe Winer ( 21 saves / 26 shots ) / Tim Warner ( 2 saves / 2 shots ) |

| Boston College won series 2–0 |

==== (2) Boston University vs. (7) Providence ====
| March 11 | Boston University | 1 – 4 | Providence | Agganis Arena | Recap |
| No Scoring | | First period | 06:35 - Chris Chaput (Gajda, Mason); 06:35 - GW - Jon Rheault (Bastarche, McDonald) |
| No scoring | | Second period | No scoring |
| (Spang) Ryan Monaghan - EA - 18:53 | | Third period | 18:10 - Jon Rheault; 19:51 - EN - Chris Chaput |
| ( 16 saves / 19 shots ) John Curry | | Goalie stats | Tyler Sims ( 51 saves / 52 shots ) |

| March 12 | Boston University | 2 – 0 | Providence | Agganis Arena | Recap |
| (MacArthur) Chris Bourque - GW - 02:03 | | First period | No scoring |
| (MacArthur, Bourque) Ryan Weston - 17:45 | | Second period | No scoring |
| No scoring | | Third period | No scoring |
| ( 20 saves / 20 shots ) John Curry | | Goalie stats | Tyler Sims ( 24 saves / 26 shots ) |

| March 13 | Boston University | 2 – 0 | Providence | Agganis Arena | Recap |
| (Van der Gulik, Zancanaro) John Laliberte - GW - 12:36 | | First period | No scoring |
| (McConnell, Roche) Brian Ewing - PP - 10:49 | | Second period | No scoring |
| No scoring | | Third period | No scoring |
| ( 22 saves / 22 shots ) John Curry | | Goalie stats | Tyler Sims ( 24 saves / 26 shots ) |

| Boston University won series 2–1 |

==== (3) New Hampshire vs. (6) Northeastern ====
| March 10 | New Hampshire | 6 – 1 | Northeastern | Whittemore Center | Recap |
| No Scoring | | First period | 05:34 - Steve Sanders (Esner, Blaine) |
| (Hemingway, Collins) Preston Callander - PP - 03:51 (Callander, Yandle) Brett Hemingway - GW PP - 09:43 (Collins, Callander) Brian Yandle - PP - 13:59 (Switzer) Brett Hemingway - 18:10 | | Second period | No scoring |
| (Hemingway, Callander) Sean Collins - 09:29 (Barker) Jacob Micflikier - 13:03 | | Third period | No scoring |
| ( 23 saves / 24 shots ) Kevin Regan | | Goalie stats | Keni Gibson ( 34 saves / 39 shots ) / Adam Geragosian ( 3 saves / 4 shots ) |

| March 11 | New Hampshire | 4 – 0 | Northeastern | Whittemore Center | Recap |
| No Scoring | | First period | No scoring |
| (Winnik, Micflikier) Justin Aikins - GW - 04:28 (Collins) Preston Callander - 04:43 (Micflikier, Winnik) Justin Aikins - 09:05 | | Second period | No scoring |
| (Ciocco, Radja) Matt Fornataro - 04:37 | | Third period | No scoring |
| ( 29 saves / 29 shots ) Jeff Pietrasiak | | Goalie stats | Keni Gibson ( 26 saves / 30 shots ) |

| New Hampshire won series 2–0 |

==== (4) Maine vs. (5) Massachusetts-Lowell ====
| March 11 | Maine | 7 – 2 | Massachusetts-Lowell | Whittemore Center | Recap |
| (Jankus) John Ronan - 01:09 (Lundin, Ramsey) Derek Damon - PP - 13:40 (Tyler, Hopson) Michel Léveillé - GW PP - 18:46 | | First period | No scoring |
| (Ronan, Léveillé) Bret Tyler - PP - 5:24 (Hamilton) Keith Johnson - 17:00 (Tyler, Shepheard) Greg Moore - PP - 19:51 | | Second period | No scoring |
| (Bellamy, Hopson) Keith Johnson - 10:21 | | Third period | 15:41 - Cleve Kinley (Godoy, Pandolfo); 16:12 - Brian Bova (Fletcher) |
| ( 26 saves / 27 shots ) Jimmy Howard / ( 0 saves / 1 shots ) Matt Lundin | | Goalie stats | John Yaros ( 23 saves / 29 shots ) / Chris Davidson ( 7 saves / 8 shots ) |

| March 12 | Maine | 5 – 1 | Massachusetts-Lowell | Whittemore Center | Recap |
| No Scoring | | First period | No scoring |
| (Tyler, Hopson) Josh Soares - PP - 03:07 (Hopson, Moore) Michel Léveillé - GW PP - 14:30 | | Second period | No scoring |
| (Hamilton, Johnson) Derek Damon - 08:14 (Hopson, Bellamy) Billy Ryan - 14:47 (Deschamps) Rob Bellamy - EN - 16:52 | | Third period | 10:40 - PP - Andrew Martin (Kinley, O'Brien) |
| ( 21 saves / 22 shots ) Jimmy Howard / ( 0 saves / 0 shots ) Matt Lundin | | Goalie stats | Peter Vetri ( 33 saves / 37 shots ) |

| Maine won series 2–0 |

=== Semifinals ===
==== (1) Boston College vs. (4) Maine ====
| March 18 | Boston College | 2 – 1 | 2OT | Maine | Fleet Center | Recap |
| No Scoring | | First period | | No scoring |
| (Gannon, Rooney) Brian Boyle - PP - 06:39 | | Second period | | 06:51 - Josh Soares (Léveillé) |
| No scoring | | Third period | | No scoring |
| (O'Hanley, Bertram) Andrew Alberts - GW - 07:09 | | Second overtime period | | No scoring |
| ( 39 saves / 40 shots ) Cory Schneider | | Goalie stats | | Jimmy Howard ( 36 saves / 38 shots ) |

==== (2) Boston University vs. (3) New Hampshire ====
| March 18 | Boston University | 2 – 5 | New Hampshire | Fleet Center | Recap |
| No Scoring | | First period | 14:38 - PP - Preston Callander (Fornatero, Winnik) |
| No scoring | | Second period | 05:46 - PP - Daniel Winnik (Barker); 06:46 - GW SH - Preston Callander (Collins, Teplitsky); 08:22 - PP - Brian Yandle (Collins, Teplitsky) |
| (Ewing) Pete MacArthur - PP - 02:09 (Ewing, Schaeffer) Bran McConnell - PP - 16:01 | | Third period | 14:04 - Daniel Winnik (Switzer) |
| ( 22 saves / 27 shots ) John Curry | | Goalie stats | Kevin Regan ( 19 saves / 21 shots ) |

=== Championship ===
==== (1) Boston College vs. (3) New Hampshire ====
| March 19 | Boston College | 3 – 1 | New Hampshire | Fleet Center | Recap |
| Brian Boyle - 13:59 | | First period | No scoring |
| (Shannon, Rooney) Brian Boyle - GW PP - 16:02 | | Second period | 03:19 - PP - Preston Callander (Collins, Barker) |
| (Shannon, Alberts) Chris Collins - 17:33 | | Third period | No scoring |
| ( 26 saves / 27 shots ) Cory Schneider | | Goalie stats | Jeff Pietrasiak ( 31 saves / 34 shots ) |

== Tournament awards ==
=== All-Tournament Team ===
- F Brian Boyle* (Boston College)
- F Preston Callander (New Hampshire)
- F Daniel Winnik (New Hampshire)
- D Andrew Alberts (Boston College)
- D Brian Yandle (New Hampshire)
- G Cory Schneider (Boston College)

* Tournament MVP(s)

=== Tournament Three Stars ===
- 3 Preston Callander (New Hampshire)
- 2 Cory Schneider (Boston College)
- 1 Brian Boyle (Boston College)
