= Horace "Pepper" Martin =

American ice hockey player and coach

Biographical details
- Born: Warner, New Hampshire
- Died: November 7, 2000
- Education: University of New Hampshire

Playing career
- 1939–1941: New Hampshire
- Position: Defenceman

Coaching career (HC unless noted)
- 1951–1962: New Hampshire

Head coaching record
- Overall: 76–76–3 (.500)

Horace Sawyer "Pepper" Martin Jr. was an American ice hockey player and head coach for New Hampshire.

== Career ==
Pepper Martin attended the University of New Hampshire beginning in the late 1930s, graduating with a BA in business in 1941. In his final two years with the university he played for the men's ice hockey team as a defenseman. After graduating Martin joined the Army and served in the Fourth Infantry Regiment during World War II. After his time with the military was up he returned to his alma mater and coached the freshman ice hockey club in 1944.

In 1951 he was named as head coach of the varsity team and set about trying to improve the team's fortunes. The biggest problem the team faced was playing without an artificial ice surface. In his first three plus years with the program it was a regular occurrence to cancel games when the weather turned and melted their playing surface. After having to cancel their final four scheduled games in 1954 plans were put in motion to solve the issue, and in February 1955 the first artificial ice rink, the Harry C. Batchelder Rink, was opened on campus. The rink was a boon for the Wildcats, who saw their winning percentage rise over the next three seasons, culminating in their first double-digit win campaign in 1957–58. Over his final five seasons with the Wildcats Martin lead his team to four 10+ win records and stepped down in 1962.

While coaching the Wildcats Martin earned a master's degree in education and began using it in 1962 when he became an assistant principal at Hamilton-Wenham Regional High School, a job he held until retiring in 1987. Martin was also a reservist in the US Army, retiring with the rank of colonel in 1984. He was inducted into the UNH 100 club Hall of Fame in 1993.

== Personal life ==
Pepper Martin died in November 2000 at the age of 81. He had one daughter, Suzanne Guptill, and three step children: Heidi Lyons, Mark Lyons and Deborah Pepernik.

== Head coaching record ==
Record table
Season	Team	Overall	Conference	Standing	Postseason
New Hampshire Wildcats Independent (1951–1961)
1951–52	New Hampshire	5–5–0			
1952–53	New Hampshire	3–6–0			
1953–54	New Hampshire	2–5–1			
1954–55	New Hampshire	5–8–0			
1955–56	New Hampshire	3–11–0			
1956–57	New Hampshire	7–7–1			
1957–58	New Hampshire	13–3–0			
1958–59	New Hampshire	14–5–0			
1959–60	New Hampshire	11–8–0			
1960–61	New Hampshire	3–11–0			
New Hampshire:		66–69–2			
New Hampshire Wildcats (ECAC Hockey) (1961–1962)
1961–62	New Hampshire	10–7–1	10–7–0	11th	
New Hampshire:		10–7–1	10–7–0		
Total:		76–76–3			
National champion Postseason invitational champion Conference regular season champion Conference regular season and conference tournament champion Division regular season champion Division regular season and conference tournament champion Conference tournament champion
