= Rube Bjorkman =

American ice hockey player (born 1929)

Biographical details
- Born: February 27, 1929 (age 97); Roseau, Minnesota, U.S.

Playing career
- 1948: US Olympic Team
- 1948–1951: Minnesota
- 1951–1952: Saint Paul Saints
- 1952: US Olympic Team
- Position: Center

Coaching career (HC unless noted)
- 1961–1962: Greenway High School
- 1963–1964: RPI
- 1964–1968: New Hampshire
- 1968–1978: North Dakota
- 1980–1983: Warroad High School

Head coaching record
- Overall: 224–234–11 (college)
Medal record
Men's ice hockey
Representing the United States
Olympic Games
Silver medal – second place	1952 Oslo	Team competition

Reuben Eugene Bjorkman (born February 27, 1929) is an American former head coach of the University of North Dakota Fighting Sioux hockey men's team. A graduate of Roseau, Minnesota High School, where he led his team to a state championship in 1946, Bjorkman was a member of the US Olympic teams in 1948 and 1952 (silver medalists). He was a three-year letter winner at the University of Minnesota.

== Career ==
Bjorkman's high school coaching career began at Greenway High School in Coleraine, Minnesota. His 1962 team competed in the Minnesota State High School Hockey Tournament. His first college coaching season (1963–1964), at RPI, culminated with his team finishing third in the NCAA Championships. Following that season he was hired as the Head Hockey Coach at the University of New Hampshire where spent four years before accepting the position at the University of North Dakota.

In 1982 Bjorkman was honored by the Minnesota Hockey Coaches Association when he was named the recipient of the Cliff Thompson Award, given for long-term, outstanding contributions to the sport of hockey in Minnesota. In 1997 The American Hockey Coaches Association recognized Bjorkman with the John "Snooks" Kelly Founders Award. Named after the Boston College coach, this award honors those people in the coaching profession who have contributed to the overall growth and development of the sport of ice hockey in the United States.

== Head coaching record ==
=== College ===
Record table
Season	Team	Overall	Conference	Standing	Postseason
Rensselaer Engineers (ECAC Hockey / Tri-State League) (1964–1969)
1963–64	Rensselaer	18–8–0	12–6–0 / 1–3–0	t-6th / 3rd	NCAA third-place game (win)
Rensselaer:		18–8–0	12–6–0 / 1–3–0		
New Hampshire Wildcats (ECAC 2) (1964–1966)
1964–65	New Hampshire	6–14–0	6–9–0		
1965–66	New Hampshire	11–12–0	11–5–0		
New Hampshire:		17–26–0	17–14–0		
New Hampshire Wildcats (ECAC Hockey) (1966–1968)
1966–67	New Hampshire	18–7–0	5–4–0	7th	
1967–68	New Hampshire	22–7–0	7–6–0		
New Hampshire:		40–14–0	12–10–0		
North Dakota Fighting Sioux (WCHA) (1968–1978)
1968–69	North Dakota	18–10–1	15–7–0	3rd	WCHA West Regional semifinals
1969–70	North Dakota	14–15–1	12–13–1	5th	WCHA East Regional semifinals
1970–71	North Dakota	14–17–2	10–15–1	7th	WCHA East Regional Finals
1971–72	North Dakota	21–14–1	18–10–0	3rd	WCHA second round
1972–73	North Dakota	17–17–2	13–15–2	7th	WCHA first round
1973–74	North Dakota	10–23–1	8–20–0	10th	
1974–75	North Dakota	6–28–2	4–26–2	10th	
1975–76	North Dakota	15–21–0	12–20–0	t-7th	
1976–77	North Dakota	19–19–0	16–16–0	5th	WCHA first round
1977–78	North Dakota	15–22–1	13–19–0	t-5th	WCHA first round
North Dakota:		149–186–11	121–161–6		
Total:		224–234–11			
National champion Postseason invitational champion Conference regular season champion Conference regular season and conference tournament champion Division regular season champion Division regular season and conference tournament champion Conference tournament champion

Sporting positions
Preceded by Ned Harkness	Head coach of Renneslaer Polytechnic Institute; 1963–1964	Succeeded by Garry Kearns
Preceded by A. Barr Snively	Head coach of the University of New Hampshire; 1964–1968	Succeeded by Charlie Holt
Preceded by Bill Selman	Head coach of the University of North Dakota; 1968–1978	Succeeded by Gino Gasparini
