= Brad Flaishans =

American ice hockey player (born 1983)

- Born: October 23, 1983 (age 42) Glendale, Arizona, USA
- Height: 6 ft 0 in (183 cm)
- Weight: 181 lb (82 kg; 12 st 13 lb)
- Position: Defenseman
- Shot: Right
- Playing career: 2004–2008

Brad Flaishans is an American former ice hockey defenseman who was an All-American for New Hampshire.

== Career ==
Flaishans arrived in Durham after a stellar final season of junior hockey that saw him named as an All-Star. While he was not yet one of the team's leaders, Flaishans did help UNH produce its 9th consecutive 20-win season as a freshman. The team reached the Hockey East championship game and also made an appearance in the NCAA Tournament for the 4th straight year. The team slipped a bit during his sophomore season but remained one of the top teams in the east. During his junior season, Flaishans took over as the premier defender on the Wildcats, more than doubling his offensive output and leading the team to a first-place finish in the conference standings. While the team again fell in the Hockey East title game, they received the #4 overall seed for the 2007 Tournament. The UNH offense failed, with Flaishans assisting on their only goal in a 1–2 loss.

For his senior season, Flaishans was named an alternate captain and produced a near repeat performance. New Hampshire was again first in the standings and one of the favorites to compete for a national championship. For the third time in Flaishans' four years, UNH had its run in the conference tournament ended by Boston College, this time losing in triple overtime in the semifinal. Despite the loss, the Wildcats were the #4 seed for the second straight season. In their opening game, Flaishans assisted on two of New Hampshire's goals, leaving the team down by only 1 goal entering the third period. Notre Dame scored right after the puck dropped and in the fight to get the goal back, UNH ended up taking two separate minor penalties. While both were successfully killed off, time became a factor and the team began pressing harder. With less than 5 minutes to play, Flaishans was called for a 5-minute major and a game misconduct for checking from behind. The infraction meant that UNH would need to score twice more while down a man, making their already difficult task nearly impossible. Even after Notre Dame took a penalty of their own, the Wildcats surrendered 2 empty net goals, ending Flaishans' college career on a low note.

After joining the Rye Rangers, Flaishans contributed to the team's success, helping them win the title in the “B” division of the Westchester branch of Hockey North America, defeating the Chiefs 6–2 in the final.

After graduating with a degree in business administration, Flaishans eschewed a professional sports career and instead joined Morgan Stanley as an analyst. Two years later he joined Clayton, Dubilier & Rice as an associate. In 2012, he entered the Harvard Business School, receiving his MBA two years later, and then rejoined Clayton, Dubilier & Rice as a principal. He has continued with the company in that capacity ever since (as of 2021).

== Career statistics ==
=== Regular season and playoffs ===
			Regular season					Playoffs
Season	Team	League	GP	G	A	Pts	PIM	GP	G	A	Pts	PIM
2002–03	Texas Tornado	NAHL	54	4	12	16	22	9	1	4	5	4
2003–04	Texas Tornado	NAHL	56	14	43	57	46	9	1	6	7	4
2004–05	New Hampshire	Hockey East	30	2	8	10	10	—	—	—	—	—
2005–06	New Hampshire	Hockey East	38	2	8	10	21	—	—	—	—	—
2006–07	New Hampshire	Hockey East	39	4	19	23	28	—	—	—	—	—
2007–08	New Hampshire	Hockey East	37	5	19	24	35	—	—	—	—	—
NAHL totals			110	18	55	73	68	—	—	—	—	—
NCAA totals			144	13	54	67	94	—	—	—	—	—

== Awards and honors ==
Award	Year
NAHL First Team All-Star	2003–04
All-Hockey East First Team	2007–08
AHCA East Second-Team All-American	2007–08
