= Charlie Holt =

American ice hockey coach (1922–2000)

Biographical details
- Born: July 17, 1922; Melrose, Massachusetts, U.S.
- Died: March 17, 2000 (age 77); Durham, New Hampshire, U.S.

Coaching career (HC unless noted)
- 1946–1947: Cranbrook Schools
- 1947–1948: Melrose High School
- 1955–1962: Northwood School
- 1962–1968: Colby
- 1968–1986: New Hampshire
- 1989–1996: Berwick Academy

Accomplishments and honors

Championships
- ECAC Hockey regular season champion (1974); ECAC Hockey tournament champion (1979)

Awards
- 1969 Spencer Penrose Award; 1974 Spencer Penrose Award; 1979 Spencer Penrose Award; 1997 US Hockey Hall of Fame; 2002 New Hampshire Hockey Hall of Fame; 2006 Massachusetts Hockey Hall of Fame; 2010 Hobey Baker Legend of College Hockey Award
Medal record
Ice hockey
Representing United States
World championships
Bronze medal – third place	1949 Stockholm

Charlie Holt (July 17, 1922 – March 17, 2000) was an American ice hockey coach. He was the head coach of the University of New Hampshire from 1968 thru 1986. He is one of three 3-time recipients of the college ice hockey National Coach-of-the-Year Award (the others being Len Ceglarski and Jack Parker).

== Career ==
Holt began coaching men's ice hockey immediately after graduating from Dartmouth in 1946. He spent one year each at Cranbrook Schools and Melrose High School before joining the US National Team for the 1949 World Ice Hockey Championships helping the Americans to a bronze medal finish, their first medal since the start of World War II. A few years later Charlie found himself behind the bench for Northwood School where he would remain as head coach from 1955-1962 before he got his first collegiate offer.

Holt's college head coaching career began just after he turned 40 in 1962–63 when he took over at Colby College. At the time the Mules were competing in the 28-team ECAC Hockey mega-conference as a Division I program but, two years later when the conference was split, Colby was placed in the Division III league and had competed as such ever since. While Holt wasn't able to lead Colby into the postseason while they were a D-I team, once they dropped down into the lower division he got them to three ECAC playoff appearances in four seasons. After Rube Bjorkman departed New Hampshire to take over the top job at North Dakota the Wildcats announced Holt as their head coach starting with the 1968–69 season.

Holt started his career in Durham off with a bang, earning the Wildcats a 22-win season as well as their first conference postseason appearance. Despite falling in the first round to Harvard Holt was awarded the Spencer Penrose Award by the American Hockey Coaches Association. Holt continued to have great success with New Hampshire over the next several years, recording winning seasons in each of the following ten campaigns, making the ECAC postseason tournament nine times in that span and winning both the regular season and conference tournament title once. Even after recording his first losing record with New Hampshire in 1979–80 season Holt brought the Wildcats back to prominence two years later with three consecutive 20-win seasons and two straight NCAA tournament berths. The returns began to diminish, however, once New Hampshire left the ECAC to become a founding member of Hockey East. In the first year Holt recorded only his second losing season with the Wildcats followed by a 5-win campaign, New Hampshire's worst record in over three decades. Holt stepped down after the 1985–86 season, allowing long-time assistant Bob Kullen to take over.

After taking a few years off Holt returned to his old stomping grounds of high school hockey when he was named as the head coach for Berwick Academy. He stayed in that position for seven years before retiring for good in 1996. In 1997 Holt was inducted into the US Hockey Hall of Fame. On March 17, 2000 Charlie Holt died as a result of cancer, He was survived by his wife Nancy and their two children: Brad and Brenda. Holt has received several posthumous honors, including being inducted into both the New Hampshire (2002) and Massachusetts (2006) Hockey Halls of Fame and being named the 2010 Hobey Baker Legend of College Hockey.

== Head coaching record ==
=== College ===
Record table
Season	Team	Overall	Conference	Standing	Postseason
Colby Mules (ECAC Hockey) (1962–1964)
1962-63	Colby	7-14-0	6-11-0		
1963-64	Colby	5-14-1	6-12-1		
Colby:		12-28-1	12-23-1		
Colby Mules (ECAC 2) (1964–1968)
1964–65	Colby	6-16-0	6-3-0	4th	
1965–66	Colby	13-12-1	8-4-0	5th	ECAC 2 Champion
1966–67	Colby	14-9-1	9-2-1	2nd	ECAC 2 Runner-Up
1967–68	Colby	20-6-1	15-2-0	2nd	ECAC 2 Semifinals
Colby:		53-43-3			
New Hampshire Wildcats (ECAC Hockey) (1968–1984)
1968–69	New Hampshire	22-6-1	10-5-1	5th	ECAC Quarterfinals
1969–70	New Hampshire	19-10-2	9-6-2	7th	ECAC Quarterfinals
1970–71	New Hampshire	20-9-0	11-9-0	9th	
1971–72	New Hampshire	20-10-0	12-6-0	5th	ECAC third-place game (win)
1972–73	New Hampshire	16-10-3	11-8-0	5th	ECAC Quarterfinals
1973–74	New Hampshire	22-9-0	15-5-0	1st	ECAC Quarterfinals
1974–75	New Hampshire	21-9-1	17-7-1	5th	ECAC Quarterfinals
1975–76	New Hampshire	24-7-0	22-6-0	2nd	ECAC Quarterfinals
1976–77	New Hampshire	27-12-0	21-6-0	2nd	NCAA consolation game (loss)
1977–78	New Hampshire	18-12-0	14-11-0	8th	ECAC Quarterfinals
1978–79	New Hampshire	22-10-3	17-5-3	2nd	NCAA consolation game (loss)
1979–80	New Hampshire	12-18-0	9-15-0	13th	
1980–81	New Hampshire	19-13-1	13-10-1	8th	ECAC Quarterfinals
1981–82	New Hampshire	22-14-0	15-7-0	3rd	NCAA consolation game (loss)
1982–83	New Hampshire	22-11-2	15-5-1	3rd	NCAA Quarterfinals
1983–84	New Hampshire	20-17-1	13-8-0	2nd	ECAC Quarterfinals
New Hampshire:		326-187-14	224-159-9		
New Hampshire Wildcats (Hockey East) (1984–1986)
1984–85	New Hampshire	16-26-1	12-21-1	4th	Hockey East Quarterfinals
1985–86	New Hampshire	5-29-3	5-27-2	7th	Hockey East Quarterfinals
New Hampshire:		21-55-4	17-48-3		
Total:		412-313-22			
National champion Postseason invitational champion Conference regular season champion Conference regular season and conference tournament champion Division regular season champion Division regular season and conference tournament champion Conference tournament champion

== See also ==
- List of college men's ice hockey coaches with 400 wins

Awards and achievements
Preceded by Ned Harkness; Len Ceglarski; Jack Parker	Spencer Penrose Award; 1968–69; 1973–74; 1978–79	Succeeded by John MacInnes; Jack Parker; Rick Comley
Preceded by Don Roberts	Hobey Baker Legends of College Hockey Award; 2010	Succeeded by Herb Brooks
