= Andrew Alberts =

American ice hockey player (born 1981)

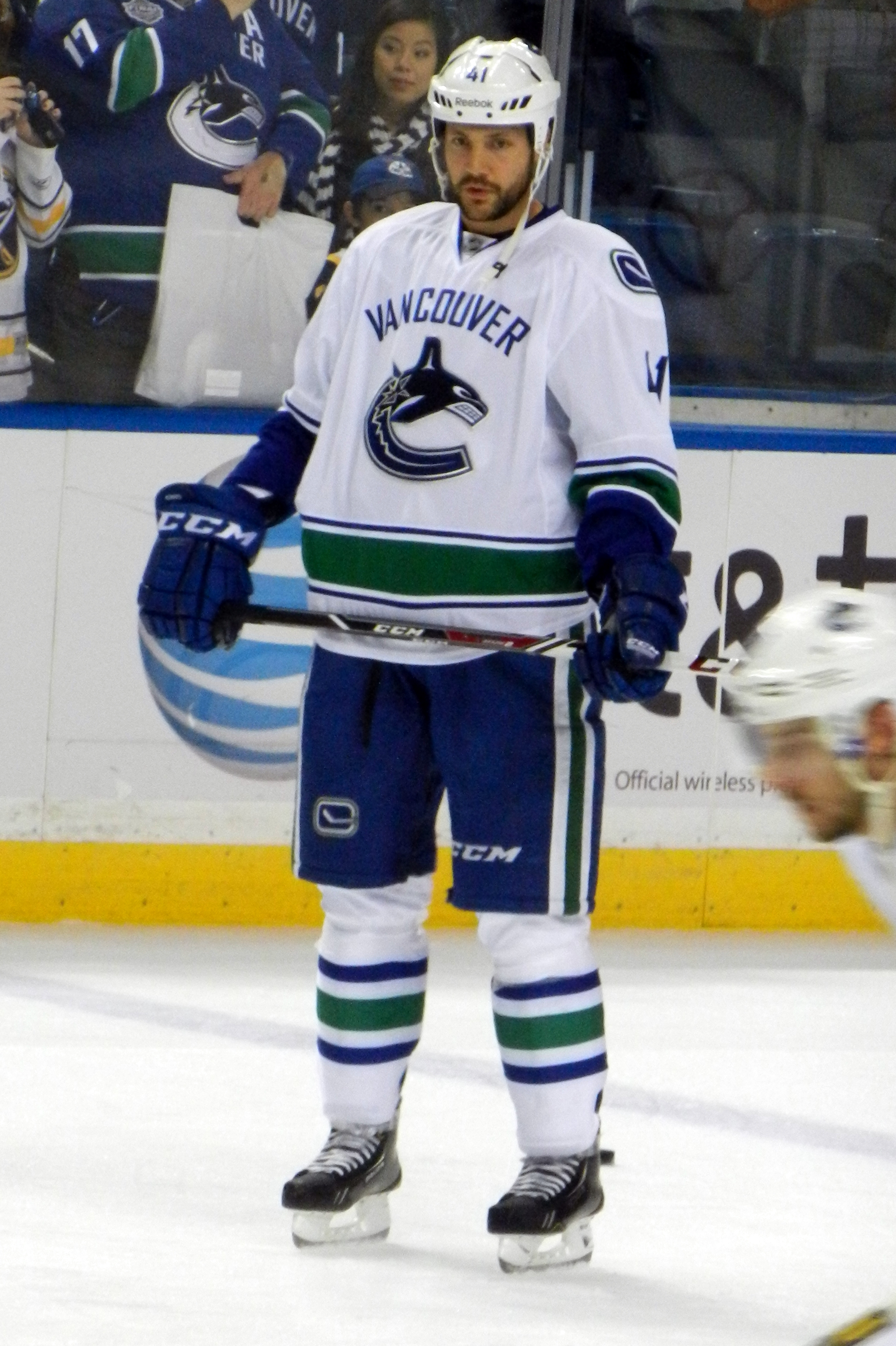
- Alberts with the Vancouver Canucks in 2013
- Born: June 30, 1981 (age 45) Minneapolis, Minnesota, U.S.
- Height: 6 ft 5 in (196 cm)
- Weight: 218 lb (99 kg; 15 st 8 lb)
- Position: Defense
- Shot: Left
- Played for: Boston Bruins; Philadelphia Flyers; Carolina Hurricanes; Vancouver Canucks
- National team: United States
- NHL draft: 179th overall, 2001; Boston Bruins
- Playing career: 2005–2014

Andrew James Alberts (born June 30, 1981) is an American former professional ice hockey player who was a defenseman in the National Hockey League (NHL) for the Boston Bruins, Philadelphia Flyers, Carolina Hurricanes and the Vancouver Canucks. A stay-at-home defenseman, he was known for playing a physical style of game.

After a two-year junior career in the United States Hockey League (USHL), Alberts was selected by the Boston Bruins 179th overall in the 2001 NHL entry draft. Following the draft, he joined the college ranks with Boston College of the Hockey East conference. In four seasons with the Eagles, Alberts was named Hockey East's Best Defensive Defenseman and was a two-time NCAA All-American. Joining the Bruins in 2005, he played three seasons with the club before being traded to the Flyers. He played with the Flyers for one year, then with the Hurricanes in 2009. At the trade deadline the following year, he was traded to the Canucks. Internationally, Alberts has competed for the United States at the 2006 and 2007 World Championships.

== Playing career ==
=== Amateur ===
Alberts played high school hockey for Benilde-St. Margaret's from 1997 to 1999. In his graduating year, he earned All-Conference honors while leading the Red Knights to a State Class A title. He played the next two seasons at the junior level in the United States Hockey League (USHL) with the Waterloo Blackhawks. Recording 4 points over 49 games in his rookie campaign, he was named the team's Most Improved Player. In 2000–01, he served as an alternate captain while raising his points total to 14 over 54 games. That summer, Alberts was drafted by the Boston Bruins in the sixth round (179th overall) of the 2001 NHL entry draft.

Following the draft, Alberts began playing college hockey for Boston College Eagles of the Hockey East conference in 2001. His first college goal came in the first round of the 2002 Beanpot, (Note: The Beanpot is an annual tournament between the four major colleges in the Boston area. It does not count toward conference standings or standings.) a short handed marker against the Boston University Terriers. He scored 12 points his freshman year before improving to 22 points in 2002–03. In his third college year, he recorded 16 points was a co-recipient of Hockey East's Best Defensive Defenseman award with Prestin Ryan of the Maine Black Bears. He was also named to the Hockey East Second All-Star and NCAA East First All-American Teams.

Alberts did not miss a game during his college career until suffering two knee injuries during his senior year in 2004–05. Limited to 30 games, he again recorded 16 points and was named to the Hockey East First All-Star Team. In the playoffs, he ended what was the longest semifinal game in Hockey East history with a double-overtime goal against the Maine Black Bears. (Note: The game ended at 89 minutes and 9 seconds, surpassing the previous record-setting match between Boston College and Boston University, which lasted 85 minutes.) Alberts earned Hockey East All-Tournament honors, as the Eagles defeated the New Hampshire Wildcats 3–1 in the final to win the Lamoriello Trophy as conference champions. He also earned his second consecutive NCAA East All-American recognition.

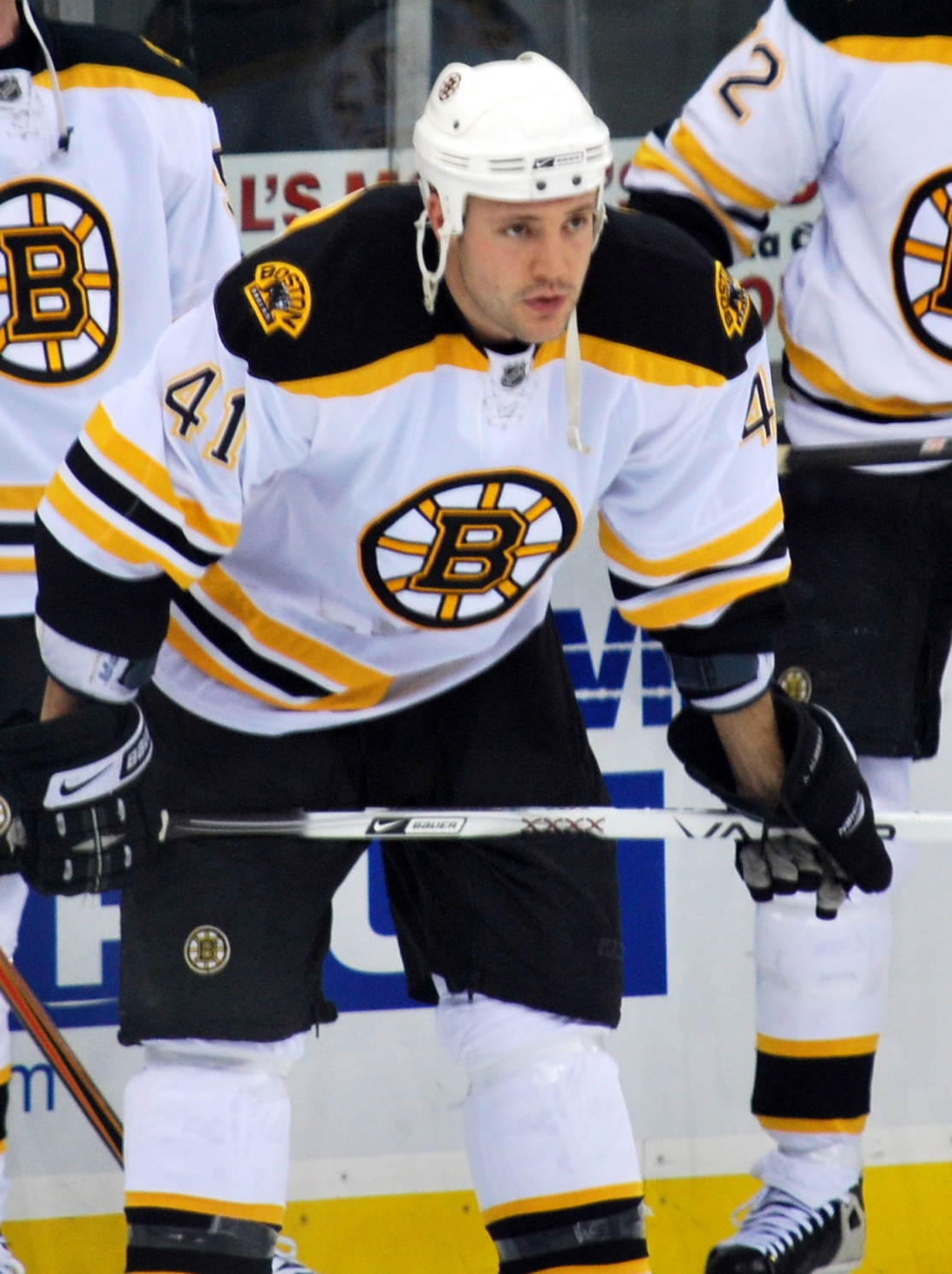
Alberts with the Bruins in April 2008

=== Professional ===
Following his senior year with the Eagles, Alberts signed an amateur tryout contract with the Boston Bruins' American Hockey League (AHL) affiliate, the Providence Bruins, on April 1, 2005. He appeared in the final eight games of the 2004–05 AHL regular season before helping the club to the Conference Finals of the playoffs. He scored his first professional goal in Game 5 of the Conference Finals against goaltender Antero Niittymäki in a 6–4 win against the Philadelphia Phantoms.

After signing a one-year NHL contract with Boston in August 2005, he appeared in his first NHL training camp in September 2005. Making the Bruins' roster for the 2005–06 season, he made his NHL debut on October 5, 2005, in a game versus the Montreal Canadiens. A month later, he notched his first NHL point, an assist, in a game against the Buffalo Sabres on November 19. In December 2005, Alberts received a ten-day assignment to Providence, recording one assist in six games during that span. Returning to the Boston lineup, he scored his first NHL goal late in the campaign during a game against the Buffalo Sabres on March 12, 2006. Playing in 73 games, Alberts scored a goal and six assists. During his rookie season, Bruins head coach Mike Sullivan experimented with playing Alberts at the forward position for roughly a month.

After re-signing for another year in July 2006, Alberts recorded 10 assists over 76 games the following season. He earned his first multi-year contract in the off-season, re-signing with the Bruins. During the 2007–08 season, he was limited to 35 games due to a head injury suffered on November 26, 2007, during a game against the Philadelphia Flyers. Going down to his knees to block a puck moving into the defensive zone, opposing forward Scott Hartnell bodychecked him, using his elbow to hit Alberts' head against the boards. Alberts left the game injured, while Hartnell received a five-minute major penalty and a game misconduct; he was later suspended an additional two games by the NHL. Alberts recovered in time to make his NHL playoff debut in April 2008, as the Bruins were eliminated in the first round by the Montreal Canadiens.

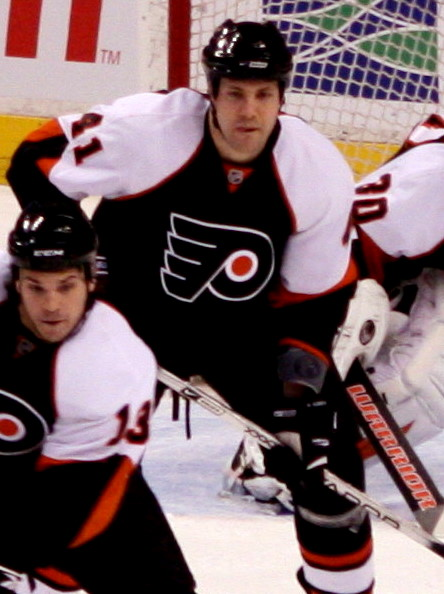
Alberts with the Flyers in March 2009.

After being a healthy scratch for the Bruins' first two games in the 2008–09 season, Alberts was traded to Philadelphia for Ned Lukacevic and a conditional 2009 draft pick on October 13, 2008. The emergence of younger defenseman Matt Hunwick was partly responsible for his expandability. Alberts became an integral part of the Flyers' defensive corps, leading the team in hits (157) and ranking third in blocked shots (133). His 12 assists and 13 points were career-highs.

Becoming an unrestricted free agent in the off-season, Alberts signed a two-year contract with the Carolina Hurricanes on July 16, 2009. The contract paid him $800,000 the first year and $1.3 million the second. After appearing in 62 games for Carolina, he was traded at the 2009–10 trade deadline on March 3, 2010, to the Vancouver Canucks in exchange for a third-round pick in the 2010 NHL entry draft (used to select Austin Levi). Between Carolina and Vancouver, Alberts finished the regular season with 3 goals and 12 points over 76 games. His defensive play struggled in his initial stint with Vancouver, often being made a healthy scratch. He continued to earn criticism from Vancouver fans and media in the playoffs, particularly for his lack of speed and for taking costly penalties.

Alberts came back to the Canucks with improved play during the 2010 pre-season and beat out Shane O'Brien for the team's final spot on defense (O'Brien was subsequently traded prior to the start of the season). Nearly one month into the season, Alberts suffered a minor knee injury during a game against the Colorado Avalanche, but did not miss any games. Later in the season, he was sucker-punched in the face by enforcer Jody Shelley during a game against the Flyers in December 2010. The two were being restrained by referees during a scrum when Shelley struck him. As a result, he received a two-game suspension from the league and forfeited $26,829.27 in salary. Though Alberts left the game, he was not injured on the play. The following month, Alberts suffered a right shoulder injury during a game against the Minnesota Wild on January 16, 2011. Shortly after recovering and returning to the lineup, he suffered another injury, breaking his wrist while blocking a shot during a game against the St. Louis Blues on February 14, 2011. He missed the remainder of the regular season, finishing with a goal and seven assists, while leading Canucks defensemen with 113 hits, over 42 games. Recovering in time for the playoffs, Alberts appeared in nine post-season games (he did not register any points) during the Canucks' run to the 2011 Stanley Cup Finals, where they were defeated in seven games by the Boston Bruins. During the off-season, Alberts was re-signed by the Canucks to a two-year, $2.45 million contract on June 29, 2011 (two days prior to his pending unrestricted free agency).

During the 2013 off-season, the Canucks signed Alberts to a one-year contract extension. Alberts suffered a concussion during a December 29, 2013, game against the Calgary Flames due to a high hit delivered by enforcer Brian McGrattan that effectively ended Alberts' professional hockey career.

== International play ==
Alberts first played internationally for the American national team at the 2006 IIHF World Championship in Riga, Latvia. He scored his first international goal in the preliminary round, a 3–0 shutout against Denmark. Later in the tournament, the United States were shut out by Sweden in the quarterfinal and finished in seventh place. Alberts returned for the 2007 IIHF World Championship in Moscow, Russia. He notched one assist as the United States finished in fifth place. They were eliminated in the quarterfinal against Finland, a 5–4 shootout loss.

== Personal life ==
Alberts was born in Minneapolis, Minnesota, to Mary and Dale Alberts. The third of four children, he has two older sisters and one younger brother. Alberts attended Eden Prairie High School for his first two years of secondary before graduating from Benilde-St. Margaret's in June 1999. While enrolled in Boston College, Alberts earned a communications degree. Prior to his senior year, he was awarded the Morrissey Brothers Memorial Hockey Scholarship.

== Career statistics ==
=== Regular season and playoffs ===
			Regular season					Playoffs
Season	Team	League	GP	G	A	Pts	PIM	GP	G	A	Pts	PIM
1997–98	Benilde–St. Margaret's	HSMN	22	0	7	7		—	—	—	—	—
1998–99	Benilde–St. Margaret's	HSMN	26	10	25	35		—	—	—	—	—
1999–00	Waterloo Blackhawks	USHL	49	2	2	4	55	4	0	0	0	12
2000–01	Waterloo Blackhawks	USHL	54	4	10	14	128	—	—	—	—	—
2001–02	Boston College	HE	38	2	10	12	52	—	—	—	—	—
2002–03	Boston College	HE	39	6	16	22	60	—	—	—	—	—
2003–04	Boston College	HE	42	4	12	16	64	—	—	—	—	—
2004–05	Boston College	HE	30	4	12	16	67	—	—	—	—	—
2004–05	Providence Bruins	AHL	8	0	0	0	16	16	1	4	5	40
2005–06	Providence Bruins	AHL	6	0	1	1	7	—	—	—	—	—
2005–06	Boston Bruins	NHL	73	1	6	7	68	—	—	—	—	—
2006–07	Boston Bruins	NHL	76	0	10	10	124	—	—	—	—	—
2007–08	Boston Bruins	NHL	35	0	2	2	39	2	0	0	0	0
2008–09	Philadelphia Flyers	NHL	79	1	12	13	61	6	0	1	1	10
2009–10	Carolina Hurricanes	NHL	62	2	8	10	74	—	—	—	—	—
2009–10	Vancouver Canucks	NHL	14	1	1	2	13	10	0	1	1	27
2010–11	Vancouver Canucks	NHL	42	1	6	7	41	9	0	0	0	6
2011–12	Vancouver Canucks	NHL	44	2	1	3	40	—	—	—	—	—
2012–13	Vancouver Canucks	NHL	24	0	1	1	32	4	0	0	0	2
2013–14	Vancouver Canucks	NHL	10	0	0	0	0	—	—	—	—	—
NHL totals			459	8	47	55	492	31	0	2	2	45

=== International ===
Year	Team	Event	Result	GP	G	A	Pts	PIM
2006	United States	WC	7th	7	1	0	1	14
2007	United States	WC	5th	7	0	1	1	14
Senior totals				14	1	1	2	28

== Awards and honors ==
Award	Year
All-Hockey East Second Team	2003–04
Hockey East's Best Defensive Defenseman (co-recipient with Prestin Ryan)	2004
AHCA East First-Team All-American	2003–04
All-Hockey East First Team	2004–05
AHCA East First-Team All-American	2004–05
Hockey East All-Tournament Team	2005
Lamoriello Trophy (Hockey East champions; with Boston College Eagles)	2005
Hockey East All-Tournament Team	2005

== Notes ==
Awards and achievements
Preceded by Cliff Loya	Hockey East Best Defensive Defenseman; 2003–04 (shared with Prestin Ryan)	Succeeded by Tim Judy
