= Gordie Clark =

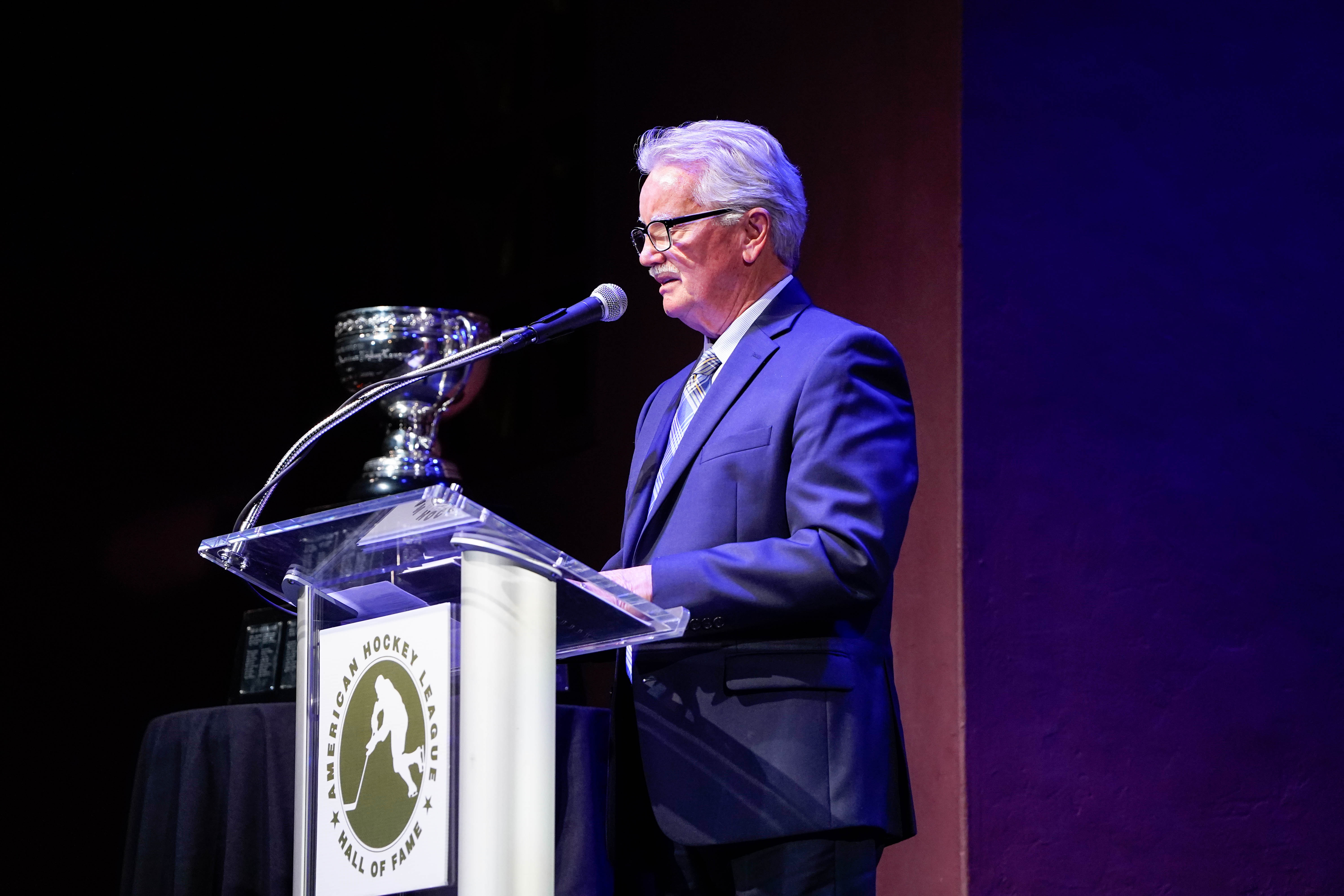
- Born: May 31, 1952 (age 74) Glasgow, Scotland, UK
- Height: 5 ft 10 in (178 cm)
- Weight: 180 lb (82 kg; 12 st 12 lb)
- Position: Right Wing
- Shot: Right
- Played for: Cincinnati Stingers; Boston Bruins; SC Riessersee
- NHL draft: 112th overall, 1972; Boston Bruins
- Playing career: 1974–1983

Gordon Corson Clark (born May 31, 1952 in Glasgow, United Kingdom and raised in Saint John, New Brunswick) is a retired ice hockey right winger. He played eight games in the National Hockey League for the Boston Bruins and 21 in the WHA for the Cincinnati Stingers between 1974 and 1979. He was the assistant coach for the Boston Bruins for a few years in the early 1990s. He is currently a scout for the Montreal Canadiens. He won a Calder Cup as a member of the American Hockey League (AHL) champion Maine Mariners.

== Playing career ==
Selected by the Boston Bruins in the 1972 NHL draft, Clark played three seasons at the University of New Hampshire before joining the Bruins organization. He played primarily for their American Hockey League affiliate, the Rochester Americans, scoring 123 goals over four seasons and serving as team captain in 1977-78. Clark appeared in eight regular-season games and one postseason game for Boston.

After splitting the first part of the 1978-79 season between the AHL's Springfield Indians and the WHA's Cincinnati Stingers, Clark joined the AHL's Maine Mariners and helped them to the 1979 Calder Cup championship. He led the AHL with 47 goals in 1979–80, and achieved personal bests with 50 goals and 101 points during the 1981–82 season.

Clark was voted a First Team AHL All-Star and a Second Team AHL All-Star twice each during his career.

== Coaching and scouting ==
Clark retired from playing in 1983 and joined the Mariners as an assistant coach in 1987–88, working with head coach Mike Milbury. He was promoted to assistant coach of the Boston Bruins in 1989 and spent three seasons there, including a trip to the Stanley Cup Final in 1990.

Clark joined the Bruins' scouting department in 1992. He served in several capacities with the New York Islanders from 1996 to 2002, including director of player personnel and assistant general manager, and later spent 20 seasons with the New York Rangers, including 2007 to 2020 as director of player personnel.

Clark joined the Montreal Canadiens as a pro scout in 2022.

== Career statistics ==
=== Regular season and playoffs ===
			Regular season					Playoffs
Season	Team	League	GP	G	A	Pts	PIM	GP	G	A	Pts	PIM
1968–69	Saint John Schooners	NBJHL	28	38	31	69	57	17	22	18	40	9
1969–70	Fredericton Chevies	NBJHL	—	—	—	—	—	—	—	—	—	—
1970–71	University of New Hampshire	ECAC	—	—	—	—	—	—	—	—	—	—
1971–72	University of New Hampshire	ECAC	30	27	30	57	28	—	—	—	—	—
1972–73	University of New Hampshire	ECAC	29	24	28	52	52	—	—	—	—	—
1973–74	University of New Hampshire	ECAC	31	25	28	53	20	—	—	—	—	—
1974–75	Boston Bruins	NHL	1	0	0	0	0	—	—	—	—	—
1974–75	Rochester Americans	AHL	65	22	42	64	34	12	7	5	12	6
1975–76	Boston Bruins	NHL	7	0	1	1	0	1	0	0	0	0
1975–76	Rochester Americans	AHL	72	30	49	79	7	7	2	3	5	5
1976–77	Rochester Americans	AHL	58	34	38	72	50	12	7	9	16	4
1977–78	Rochester Americans	AHL	75	37	51	88	18	6	2	0	2	0
1978–79	Springfield Indians	AHL	33	12	15	27	8	—	—	—	—	—
1978–79	Cincinnati Stingers	WHA	21	3	3	6	2	—	—	—	—	—
1978–79	Maine Mariners	AHL	13	7	11	18	2	10	6	9	15	2
1979–80	Maine Mariners	AHL	79	47	43	90	64	12	5	4	9	7
1980–81	Maine Mariners	AHL	59	25	29	54	32	15	6	9	15	4
1981–82	Maine Mariners	AHL	80	50	51	101	34	4	5	0	5	5
1982–83	SC Riessersee	GER	34	40	21	61	51	6	4	2	6	5
1982–83	Maine Mariners	AHL	6	3	3	6	2	16	2	9	11	2
WHA totals			21	3	3	6	2	—	—	—	—	—
NHL totals			8	0	1	1	0	1	1	0	1	0

== Awards and honors ==
Award	Year
All-ECAC Hockey First Team	1971–72
All-ECAC Hockey First Team	1972–73
AHCA East All-American	1972–73
All-ECAC Hockey First Team	1973–74
AHCA East All-American	1973–74
AHL Second Team All-Star	1975–76
AHL Second Team All-Star	1976–77
AHL Calder Cup champion	1978–79
AHL First Team All-Star	1979–80
AHL First Team All-Star	1981–82

== See also ==
- List of National Hockey League players from the United Kingdom
