= Louis Frigon =

Canadian ice hockey player (born 1948)

- Born: Montreal, Quebec, Canada
- Height: 6 ft 0 in (183 cm)
- Weight: 175 lb (79 kg; 12 st 7 lb)
- Position: Center
- Shot: Left
- Played for: New Hampshire; Muskegon Mohawks
- NHL draft: Undrafted
- Playing career: 1968–1974

Louis Frigon is a Canadian retired ice hockey center and coach who was the NCAA Scoring Champion in 1970–71.

== Career ==
Frigon was a star player for the Lachine Maroons, leading the team in scoring in his final year of junior hockey. Frigon was recruited to the University of New Hampshire and debuted for the varsity team the following year. He was an instant hit for the Wildcats, leading the team in goals with 33 as a sophomore and helped the program reach the ECAC Tournament for the first time. The next season Frigon more than tripled his assist total and continued to pile up the goals, finishing tied for second in the nation with 63 points. Despite his gaudy scoring numbers, Frigon and the entire UNH team didn't receive much notice by college hockey. This was primarily due to the team's middling performance within their conference while the club padded its stat totals against many inferior opponents. In 1970 the team finished 9–6–2 in ECAC play, however, they went 10–4 otherwise, including eight games against College Division opponents.

Frigon was named team captain in his senior season and responded with his best year yet. He led the nation with 86 points, setting program records in goals, assists and points. His highlights include a 7-assist, 10-point game against Colgate on February 27 that still stand as program highs (as of 2020). Unfortunately, New Hampshire was still seen in an unfavorable light by the voters and Frigon was left off both the All-ECAC and All-American teams. Despite the slight, Frigon was the team's all-time leading scorer when he graduated and still holds the record for single-season points per game (2.97).

After college, Frigon played three years of professional hockey and was averaged more than a point per game in more than two seasons with the Muskegon Mohawks. He ended his playing career after the 1974 season and accepted a position as an assistant coach with Rensselaer. He remained with the Engineers for two seasons before he got a turn leading Plattsburgh State. In 1976 the Cardinals were only a year old and were just admitted to ECAC 2, consequently the team suffered a losing record in Frigon's first season. However, Frigon quickly got his program turned around and Plattsburgh won the West Region the very next season. While the Cardinals fell in the regional semifinal, they came back even stronger in 1979, going 22–2 in conference but were again stymied in the semis. Frigon's team finished second in the West in 1980 but reached the regional final. In the club's first championship game they were felled by Oswego State 3–8 but then had to deal with replacing their coach when Frigon resigned in the offseason. After his departure Plattsburgh continued to rank as one of the top programs in lower-tier college hockey, vying for championships more often than not in the years since.

Frigon was inducted into the New Hampshire Athletic Hall of Fame in 1985.

== Career statistics ==
=== Regular season and playoffs ===
			Regular Season					Playoffs
Season	Team	League	GP	G	A	Pts	PIM	GP	G	A	Pts	PIM
1964–65	Montréal N.D.G. Monarchs	MMJHL	41	25	26	51	12	—	—	—	—	—
1965–66	Lachine Maroons	MMJHL	34	21	33	54	23	—	—	—	—	—
1966–67	Lachine Maroons	MMJHL	35	29	26	55	39	—	—	—	—	—
1968–69	New Hampshire	ECAC Hockey	29	33	11	44	14	—	—	—	—	—
1969–70	New Hampshire	ECAC Hockey	31	27	36	63	24	—	—	—	—	—
1970–71	New Hampshire	ECAC Hockey	29	38	48	86	58	—	—	—	—	—
1971–72	Muskegon Mohawks	IHL	26	10	17	27	8	—	—	—	—	—
1972–73	Muskegon Mohawks	IHL	64	26	39	65	10	—	—	—	—	—
1973–74	Muskegon Mohawks	IHL	74	35	41	76	19	3	1	0	1	0
MMJHL Totals			110	75	85	160	74	—	—	—	—	—
NCAA Totals			89	98	95	193	96	—	—	—	—	—
IHL Totals			163	71	97	168	37	3	1	0	1	0

== Head coaching record ==
Louis Frigon
Biographical details
- Education: University of New Hampshire

Coaching career (HC unless noted)
- 1974–1976: Rensselaer (assistant)
- 1976–1980: Plattsburgh State

Head coaching record
- Overall: 73–30–2 (.705)

Accomplishments and honors

Championships
- 1977–78 ECAC 2 West Champion; 1978–79 ECAC 2 West Champion

Record table
Season	Team	Overall	Conference	Standing	Postseason
Plattsburgh State Cardinals (ECAC 2) (1976–1980)
1976–77	Plattsburgh State	9–14–0	5–13–0	13th	
1977–78	Plattsburgh State	18–4–0	16–3–0	1st	ECAC 2 West Semifinals
1978–79	Plattsburgh State	26–3–0	22–2–0	1st	ECAC 2 West Semifinals
1979–80	Plattsburgh State	20–9–2	18–5–2	2nd	ECAC 2 West Runner-Up
Plattsburgh State:		73–30–2	61–23–2		
Total:		73–30–2			
National champion Postseason invitational champion Conference regular season champion Conference regular season and conference tournament champion Division regular season champion Division regular season and conference tournament champion Conference tournament champion

Awards and achievements
Preceded by Tim Sheehy	NCAA Ice Hockey Scoring Champion; 1970–71	Succeeded by Dave Skalko
