= Dave O'Connor =

Biographical details
- Born: Belmont, Massachusetts, U.S.

Playing career
- 1964–1966: New Hampshire
- Position: Forward

Coaching career (HC unless noted)
- 1976–1987: New Hampshire (assistant)
- 1987–1988: New Hampshire
- 1991–1992: New Hampshire (assistant)

Head coaching record
- Overall: 7–20–3 (.283)

David O'Connor is an American former ice hockey coach and player. He was the interim head coach of the University of New Hampshire for a year while head coach Bob Kullen was recovering from a heart transplant.

== Career ==
O'Connor played for the Wildcats hockey team in the mid-60's for the brief time while the team played in the lower classification while also playing for the football team. He returned to his alma mater in 1972 as an assistant coach for the football program and remained with the team for the next 18 seasons. In 1976 he added to his coaching responsibilities by becoming an assistant for the hockey team, a post he held until 1987 when he was named as the interim head coach for the 1987–88 season. O'Conner stepped away from the hockey team afterwards but returned for one more season as an assistant in 1992 before retiring.

He was inducted into UNH sports hall of fame in 2008.

== Head coaching record ==
Record table
Season	Team	Overall	Conference	Standing	Postseason
New Hampshire Wildcats (Hockey East) (1987–1988)
1987–88	New Hampshire	7–20–3	6–18–2	7th	
New Hampshire:		7–20–3	6–18–2		
Total:		7–20–3			
National champion Postseason invitational champion Conference regular season champion Conference regular season and conference tournament champion Division regular season champion Division regular season and conference tournament champion Conference tournament champion
