= Bob Kullen =

American ice hockey coach and player (1949–1990)

Biographical details
- Born: 1949; Milton, Massachusetts, U.S.
- Died: November 2, 1990 (aged 41); Durham, New Hampshire, U.S.

Playing career
- 1969–1971: Bowdoin
- 1971–1973: Braintree Hawks
- 1973–1974: Manchester Monarchs
- Position: Defenseman

Coaching career (HC unless noted)
- 1977–1986: New Hampshire (assistant)
- 1986–1987: New Hampshire
- 1988–1990: New Hampshire

Robert A. Kullen (1949 – November 2, 1990) was an American ice hockey coach and player. He was the head coach of the University of New Hampshire for a short time in the late 1980s before a rare heart condition that necessitated a heart transplant forced him to step away from his position and ultimately cost him his life a month later. In addition to coaching New Hampshire's ice hockey team, he also coached the New Hampshire golf team and soccer team.

== Career ==
Bob Kullen starred as a defenseman for Bowdoin College until graduating in the spring of 1971. He continued playing in a short minor league career, appearing for the Braintree Hawks in two seasons then for the Manchester Monarchs in the only year the Can-Am Hockey League was in operation before calling it quits after 1974. He turned to coaching afterwards, finding his way onto the staff of Charlie Holt at New Hampshire starting in 1977–78 and remaining as an assistant there until Holt's retirement in 1985–86.

Kullen was chosen as Holt's successor and began rebuilding the team that had won only 5 games the year before. His first two recruiting classes lay the foundation for UNH's success in the 1990s, included NHL players Chris Winnes, Adren Plavisc, Kevin Dean, Scott Morrow, and All-Americans Joe Flanagan and Domenic Amodeo, and Hockey East all-stars David MacIntyre and Savo Mitrovic. After a season of modest gains it was discovered that Kullen suffered from a rare form of heart disease and had to have an immediate heart transplant that caused him to miss the entire 1987–88 season. Another long-time UNH assistant, Dave O'Connor filled in for Kullen, but the team was predictably flat in his absence. Kullen returned behind the bench the following year and continued the work he had started, getting the team to 12 wins in 1988–89 and then followed it up with a 17–17–5 mark, their first .500 season since leaving ECAC Hockey after 1983–84. While he was expecting to continue coaching for the foreseeable future, Kullen began rejecting the transplanted heart in the fall of 1990 and was forced to turn over the team to Dick Umile to recover but he died about a month later on November 2.

In his memory, Hockey East renamed their Coach of the Year Award in his honor and fittingly the first recipient of the 'Bob Kullen Coach of the Year Award' was the man who replaced him at New Hampshire. In 1991 Bob Kullen became the first player to have his uniform number retired by Bowdoin College in the history of the athletic department.

== Head coaching record ==
Record table
Season	Team	Overall	Conference	Standing	Postseason
New Hampshire Wildcats (Hockey East) (1986–1987)
1986–87	New Hampshire	8–27–3	5–24–3	7th	
New Hampshire:		8–27–3	5–24–3		
New Hampshire Wildcats (Hockey East) (1988–1990)
1988–89	New Hampshire	12–22–0	9–17–0	6th	Hockey East Quarterfinals
1989–90	New Hampshire	17–17–5	8–9–4	5th	Hockey East Semifinals
New Hampshire:		29–39–5	17–26–4		
Total:		37–66–8			
National champion Postseason invitational champion Conference regular season champion Conference regular season and conference tournament champion Division regular season champion Division regular season and conference tournament champion Conference tournament champion

== See also ==
- Hockey East Awards
