= Rod Blackburn =

American ice hockey player (1939–2021)

- Born: July 29, 1939 Berlin, New Hampshire, U.S.
- Died: November 19, 2021 (aged 82) Berlin, New Hampshire, U.S.
- Position: Goaltender
- Played for: New Hampshire
- National team: United States
- Playing career: 1958–1961

Roderick Blackburn (July 29, 1939 – November 19, 2021) was an American ice hockey goaltender who was the first All-American for New Hampshire in 1961.

== Career ==
Blackburn was a four-year player for Notre Dame High School in Berlin, New Hampshire, and backstopped the team to four consecutive state tournaments. As a senior, Blackburn helped the team win the New England high school championship and was a star recruit for the University of New Hampshire in 1957. After a year on the freshman team Blackburn became the team's starting goaltender. New Hampshire was not among the elite eastern teams at the time: despite finishing with a 14–5 record, the Wildcats weren't considered for a postseason invitation, based on how weak their schedule was relative to other teams. Blackburn was one of the few highlights of the team during this time, and he was named team captain for his senior season. During his final year, the Wildcats produced a dreadful 3–11 record, with Blackburn surrendering over four goals a game. Despite the poor numbers, Rod was held in high regard both within the program and from outside sources. He was named an eastern All-American that season, becoming the first Wildcat so honored.

After graduating he returned to Berlin and played for the local senior team. In the mid '60s he was selected for the US men's national ice hockey team. Though he was on the roster, he did not play at the 1965 Ice Hockey World Championships, but did appear in four games the following year. The team finished in a disappointing sixth place, and he was not retained for future teams. His final official appearances came in 1969 for the Rochester Mustangs, but after two poor outings Blackburn called it a career.

He was inducted into the New Hampshire Athletic Hall of Fame in 1983.

== Statistics ==
=== Regular season and playoffs ===
			Regular season									Playoffs
Season	Team	League	GP	W	L	T	MIN	GA	SO	GAA	SV%	GP	W	L	MIN	GA	SO	GAA	SV%
1958–59	New Hampshire	NCAA	—	14	—	—	—	—	—	—	—	—	—	—	—	—	—	—	—
1959–60	New Hampshire	NCAA	13	6	5	0	705	35	2	2.98	.900	—	—	—	—	—	—	—	—
1960–61	New Hampshire	NCAA	14	3	11	0	815	66	0	4.86	.900	—	—	—	—	—	—	—	—
1961–62	Berlin Maroons	US Senior	—	—	—	—	—	—	—	—	—	—	—	—	—	—	—	—	—
1962–63	Berlin Maroons	US Senior	—	—	—	—	—	—	—	—	—	—	—	—	—	—	—	—	—
1964–65	St. Paul Steers	USHL	—	—	—	—	—	—	—	—	—	—	—	—	—	—	—	—	—
1968–69	Rochester Mustangs	USHL	2	—	—	—	120	15	0	7.50	.808	—	—	—	—	—	—	—	—
NCAA totals			—	23	—	—	—	—	—	—	—	—	—	—	—	—	—	—	—

=== International ===
Year	Team	GP	W	L	T	MIN	GA	SO	GAA	SV%
1966	United States	4	—	—	—	—	—	—	—	—

== Awards and honors ==
Award	Year
AHCA East All-American	1960–61
