= 1964–65 NCAA College Division men's ice hockey season =

- Duration: November 1964– March, 1965
- NCAA tournament: 1965

The 1964–65 NCAA College Division men's ice hockey season began in November 1964 and concluded in March. This was the first formal season of College Division ice hockey and was caused by ECAC Hockey dividing its 29-team conference into an upper- and lower-tier. The lower tier, called ECAC 2, was the first official non-university conference.

The entire College Division was a loose collection of schools with most leagues not even having a playoff tournament. The College Division never had a formal national tournament during its existence and it was only in 1977 that a second-tier National Championship was created, 4 years after the NCAA adopted the numerical classification system.

== Regular season ==
=== Season tournaments ===
Tournament	Dates	Teams	Champion
MIT Tournament		4	Pennsylvania
Yankee Conference Tournament	December 29–30	4	New Hampshire

=== Standings ===
1964–65 ECAC 2 standings
	Conference							Overall					
	GP	W	L	T	Pct.	GF	GA	GP	W	L	T	GF	GA
Middlebury†	13	11	2	0	.846			22	14	8	0	105	82
Norwich	16	11	5	0	.688	73	57	21	13	8	0	92	91
Colby	9	6	3	0	.667			22	6	16	0	70	130
Bowdoin	14	9	5	0	.643			21	11	10	0		
Williams	12	7	5	0	.583			18	8	10	0	80	69
Merrimack	7	4	3	0	.571	25	21	14	6	8	0	46	59
American International	12	6	6	0	.500			17	7	10	0	80	83
Connecticut	9	4	5	0	.444	43	68	16	10	6	0	97	92
New Hampshire	15	6	9	0	.400	64	51	20	6	14	0	76	90
Hamilton	8	3	5	0	.375			15	4	11	0		
Massachusetts	12	4	8	0	.333	34	52	15	4	11	0	42	73
Vermont	12	4	8	0	.333	42	64	16	5	11	0	53	83
Amherst	12	4	8	0	.333			17	8	9	0		
MIT	8	0	8	0	.000			12	4	8	0		
† indicates conference regular season champion

1964–65 NCAA College Division Independent ice hockey standings
	Overall record					
	GP	W	L	T	GF	GA
Boston State	17	14	3	0		
Nichols	17	9	8	0	65	75
Oberlin						
RIT	17	11	6	0		
Salem State	11	10	1	0		
St. Cloud State	9	5	4	0	52	48
St. Olaf	12	7	4	1	–	–

1964–65 Minnesota Intercollegiate Athletic Conference ice hockey standings
	Conference							Overall					
	GP	W	L	T	Pts	GF	GA	GP	W	L	T	GF	GA
Saint Mary's †	14	13	1	0	.929	119	30	17	13	4	0		
St. Thomas	10	7	3	0	.700	59	37	12	8	4	0		
Saint John's	10	7	3	0	.700	46	35	11	7	4	0		
Augsburg	13	7	5	1	.577	74	39	16	8	7	1		
Macalester	14	6	7	1	.464	45	60	18	6	11	1		
Concordia (MN)	11	3	8	0	.273	25	47	12	3	9	0		
Hamline	11	3	8	0	.273	30	49	15	4	11	0		
Gustavus Adolphus	14	0	14	0	.000	19	107	15	1	14	0		
† indicates conference regular season champion

== See also ==
- 1964–65 NCAA University Division men's ice hockey season
