= Harry C. Batchelder Rink =

Former ice rink in Durham, New Hampshire

Coordinates: 43.1392°N 70.9335°W

- Interactive map of Harry C. Batchelder Rink
- Location: Durham, New Hampshire, United States
- Owner: University of New Hampshire
- Operator: University of New Hampshire

Construction
- Opened: February 1955
- Closed: 1965
- Demolished: yes

Tenant
- UNH Men's Hockey

Harry C. Batchelder Rink was the first artificial ice surface operated by the University of New Hampshire. The equipment needed to produce the ice was donated by UNH alum Harry C. Batchelder and the rink opened in February 1955 next to the previous natural ice rink used by the men's ice hockey team. The rink was in operation for about ten years before indoor Snively Arena was opened in 1965. During its existence the rink had a chain-link fence installed for hockey games.
