= Brian Yandle =

American ice hockey player (born 1983)

- Born: May 29, 1983 (age 43) Milton, Massachusetts, USA
- Height: 6 ft 0 in (183 cm)
- Weight: 180 lb (82 kg; 12 st 12 lb)
- Position: Defenseman
- Shot: Right
- Played for: Lowell Lock Monsters; Phoenix Roadrunners; Worcester Sharks; Augusta Lynx; Gwinnett Gladiators; Toledo Walleye
- Playing career: 2002–2010

Brian Yandle is an American ice hockey coach and former defenseman who was a two-time All-American for New Hampshire.

== Career ==
Yandle's college career started in 2002 with New Hampshire when he debuted for the ice hockey team. He began as a depth player and helped the Wildcats reach the 2003 NCAA championship game. As a sophomore, Yandle become the team's leading point producer from the blueline and continued in that capacity for the remainder of his time with UNH. For his third season, Yandle netted career highs for goals and points and was named an All-American. He was named team captain for his final season and, while his offensive numbers fell off slightly, Yandle made the All-American squad once more.

After the Wildcats were eliminated from the NCAA Tournament, Yandle finished the season with the Lowell Lock Monsters. He became a full-time professional player the following year but wasn't able to find a consistent spot on a roster. He became the Hockey Director at the Alpharetta Family Skate Center in Alpharetta, Georgia (a suburb of Atlanta) in 2008 and worked there for over two years. During that time he twice made further appearances with ECHL teams but it only amounted to 4 games over two seasons.

Fully retired as a player in 2010, Yandle returned home to Massachusetts and worked as a manager for ProEvolution Hockey and a coach for the Boston Jr. Terriers. He worked for both until 2015, which enabled him to be able to coach all three of his sons in junior hockey. In 2020, Yandle and fellow former college hockey player Mike Mottau began hosting a podcast called 'The Rink Shrinks'.

== Personal life ==
Brian's father Bud played college hockey at Boston College. His uncle Mike is a former coach and currently works as a scout for the San Jose Sharks. His younger brother Keith also plays hockey and went on to a long career in the NHL. In December 2015, Yandle was hired as a policeman for the Boston Police Department.

== Career statistics ==
=== Regular season and playoffs ===
			Regular season					Playoffs
Season	Team	League	GP	G	A	Pts	PIM	GP	G	A	Pts	PIM
1999–00	Catholic Memorial School	MA-HS	—	—	—	—	—	—	—	—	—	—
2000–01	Cushing Academy	US-Prep	—	—	—	—	—	—	—	—	—	—
2001–02	Cushing Academy	US-Prep	—	—	—	—	—	—	—	—	—	—
2002–03	New Hampshire	Hockey East	31	1	5	6	14	—	—	—	—	—
2003–04	New Hampshire	Hockey East	41	11	17	28	44	—	—	—	—	—
2004–05	New Hampshire	Hockey East	41	13	22	35	33	—	—	—	—	—
2005–06	New Hampshire	Hockey East	40	6	24	30	30	—	—	—	—	—
2005–06	Lowell Lock Monsters	AHL	6	0	0	3	3	—	—	—	—	—
2006–07	Worcester Sharks	AHL	1	0	0	0	2	—	—	—	—	—
2006–07	Phoenix Roadrunners	ECHL	28	4	10	14	16	4	0	1	1	0
2007–08	Phoenix Roadrunners	ECHL	30	6	14	20	14	—	—	—	—	—
2007–08	Augusta Lynx	ECHL	18	1	7	8	24	—	—	—	—	—
2008–09	Gwinnett Gladiators	ECHL	3	0	0	0	2	—	—	—	—	—
2009–10	Toledo Walleye	ECHL	1	0	0	0	0	—	—	—	—	—
NCAA totals			153	31	68	99	121	—	—	—	—	—
ECHL totals			80	11	31	42	56	4	0	1	1	0
AHL totals			7	0	3	3	8	—	—	—	—	—

== Awards and honors ==
Award	Year
All-Hockey East Second Team	2004–05
AHCA East Second-Team All-American	2004–05
All-Hockey East Second Team	2005–06
AHCA East Second-Team All-American	2005–06
