= Tim Burke (ice hockey) =

American ice hockey player and coach (born 1955)

- Born: May 29, 1955 (age 71) Melrose, Massachusetts, U.S.
- Height: 6 ft 0 in (183 cm)
- Weight: 190 lb (86 kg; 13 st 8 lb)
- Position: Defense
- Shot: Left
- Played for: Nova Scotia Voyageurs (AHL); Jokerit (SM-l)
- NHL draft: 124th overall, 1975; Montreal Canadiens
- WHA draft: 25th overall, 1974; Chicago Cougars
- Playing career: 1977–1983

Tim Burke (born May 29, 1955) is an American former ice hockey defenseman and assistant coach in many different leagues.

== Career ==
Tim Burke serves as the director of scouting for the San Jose Sharks. In this role, he coordinates and oversees the Sharks efforts in the National Hockey League's annual Entry Draft while working closely with Executive Vice President and General Manager Mike Grier (ice hockey) and his staff. In addition to being the principal decision-maker at the draft table, Burke is also responsible for evaluating amateur talent at every level in all North American and European leagues and supervises all aspects of the club's amateur scouting efforts. Burke's selection process has helped the Sharks create a foundation of talented players from which to build the franchise around — including Patrick Marleau (1997), Douglas Murray (1999), Ryane Clowe (2001), Joe Pavelski (2003), Thomas Greiss (2004), Torrey Mitchell (2004), Marc-Edouard Vlasic (2005), Jamie McGinn (2006) Justin Braun (2007) and 2011 Calder Memorial Trophy runner-up Logan Couture (2007), all of whom played roles in the Sharks recent seasons. Since the 2003 NHL Draft, no NHL team has produced more games played among their drafted players than the Sharks (3,123) and the Sharks are tied for first in the NHL for average number of homegrown players on the team's roster each season since the 2005-06 (12). A member of the Sharks scouting department since the 1992-93 campaign, Burke was promoted to his current position on June 4, 1996. Before his promotion, Burke served as director of professional scouting from 1992–96 and evaluated talent throughout all North American professional leagues and assisted with amateur scouting. From 1987-92, he spent five seasons in the New Jersey Devils organization, serving in several capacities, including as a Devils assistant coach, head coach for the American Hockey League's Utica Devils and as a pro scout. Burke was also an assistant coach at Princeton University from 1984-86. A former defenseman, Burke was selected by the Montreal Canadiens in the seventh round (124th overall) of the 1975 NHL Entry Draft and by the Chicago Cougars in the second round (25th overall) of the 1974 World Hockey Association Entry Draft. He was a four-year letterman in both hockey and baseball at the University of New Hampshire, where he was named to the NCAA's All-America hockey team after his senior campaign. He played seven years of professional hockey following a collegiate career, including three seasons (1977–80) with the Nova Scotia Voyageurs, the Canadiens AHL affiliate, and one season with Jokerit Helsinki in the Finnish Elite League.

== See also ==
List of New Jersey Devils head coaches

== Awards and honors ==
Award	Year
All-ECAC Hockey Second Team	1975–76
All-ECAC Hockey Second Team	1976–77
AHCA East All-American	1976–77
