= Sean Collins (ice hockey forward, born 1983) =

American ice hockey player

- Born: February 9, 1983 (age 43) Reading, Massachusetts, U.S.
- Height: 5 ft 9 in (175 cm)
- Weight: 170 lb (77 kg; 12 st 2 lb)
- Position: Forward
- Shot: Left
- Played for: Wilkes-Barre/Scranton Penguins; Philadelphia Phantoms; Worcester Sharks; Sport
- NHL draft: 289th overall, 2002; Colorado Avalanche
- Playing career: 2005–2009

Sean Collins (born February 9, 1983) is an American former professional ice hockey player. He was selected by the Colorado Avalanche in the 9th round (289th overall) of the 2002 NHL entry draft.

== Playing career ==
Collins was the third last player (289th overall) selected in the 2002 NHL entry draft. When drafted, Collins was playing with the New Hampshire Wildcats men's ice hockey team of NCAA's Division I Hockey East Association where he scored 77 goals and 96 assists in his four-year career with the UNH Wildcats.

He began his professional career in 2005. In the 2005–06 ECHL season he scored 27 goals and added 49 assists to lead the Wheeling Nailers in points, and the following year he posted identical numbers. Collins played three seasons (2005–08) for the Nailers, recording 69 goals and 139 assists for a total of 208 points. He had two AHL call-ups in 2006-07, playing three games for the Philadelphia Phantoms and four games for the Worcester Sharks. In 2008–09 he signed for Sport in the Mestis, the second-tier league in Finland, but played just four games before returning to North America with the Tulsa Oilers in the Central Hockey League.

== Career statistics ==
			Regular season					Playoffs
Season	Team	League	GP	G	A	Pts	PIM	GP	G	A	Pts	PIM
1997–98	Reading Memorial High School	HSMA	22	32	26	58		—	—	—	—	—
1998–99	Reading Memorial High School	HSMA	25	32	35	67		—	—	—	—	—
1999–2000	Reading Memorial High School	HSMA	22	37	42	79		—	—	—	—	—
2000–01	Reading Memorial High School	HSMA	24	28	36	64		—	—	—	—	—
2001–02	University of New Hampshire	HE	40	20	25	45	4	—	—	—	—	—
2002–03	University of New Hampshire	HE	41	22	8	30	12	—	—	—	—	—
2003–04	University of New Hampshire	HE	41	16	26	42	28	—	—	—	—	—
2004–05	University of New Hampshire	HE	42	19	37	56	26	—	—	—	—	—
2005–06	Wilkes–Barre/Scranton Penguins	AHL	8	0	1	1	2	—	—	—	—	—
2005–06	Wheeling Nailers	ECHL	62	27	49	76	16	9	7	9	16	6
2006–07	Wheeling Nailers	ECHL	57	27	49	76	43	—	—	—	—	—
2006–07	Philadelphia Phantoms	AHL	3	0	2	2	0	—	—	—	—	—
2006–07	Worcester Sharks	AHL	4	0	1	1	2	—	—	—	—	—
2007–08	Wheeling Nailers	ECHL	55	15	41	56	50	—	—	—	—	—
2008–09	Sport	Mestis	4	0	0	0	0	—	—	—	—	—
2008–09	Tulsa Oilers	CHL	42	11	17	28	23	—	—	—	—	—
ECHL totals			174	69	139	208	109	9	7	9	16	6
AHL totals			15	0	4	4	4	—	—	—	—	—

== Awards and honors ==
Award	Year
College
All-Hockey East Rookie Team	2001–02
All-Hockey East Second Team	2004–05
AHCA East First-Team All-American	2004–05

Awards and achievements
Preceded by Chuck Kobasew	Hockey East Rookie of the Year; 2001–02	Succeeded by Jimmy Howard
