= New Hampshire Wildcats men's ice hockey =

American college ice hockey program

- Current season
- University: University of New Hampshire
- Conference: Hockey East
- First season: 1924–25
- Head coach: Michael Souza; 8th season, 91–118–27 (.443)
- Assistant coaches: Glenn Stewart; Jeff Giuliano; Sean Maguire
- Arena: Whittemore Center; Durham, New Hampshire
- Colors: Blue, gray, and white

NCAA tournament runner-up
- 1999, 2003

NCAA tournament Frozen Four
- 1977, 1979, 1982, 1998, 1999, 2002, 2003

NCAA tournament appearances
- 1977, 1979, 1982, 1983, 1992, 1994, 1995, 1997, 1998, 1999, 2000, 2002, 2003, 2004, 2005, 2006, 2007, 2008, 2009, 2010, 2011, 2013

Conference tournament champions
- ECAC: 1979; Hockey East: 2002, 2003

Conference regular season champions
- Hockey East: 1992, 1997, 1999, 2002, 2003, 2007, 2008, 2010

Current uniform

The New Hampshire Wildcats men's ice hockey team is a National Collegiate Athletic Association (NCAA) Division I college ice hockey program that represents the University of New Hampshire. The Wildcats are a member of Hockey East. They play at the Whittemore Center Arena in Durham, New Hampshire.

== History ==
=== Early years ===
Efforts to organize an ice hockey team at New Hampshire College of Agriculture and the Mechanic Arts date to the early 1910s. By January 1914, a college team was playing "a short schedule of games" against local teams such as an athletic association from Exeter, New Hampshire. A summary of the 1914 hockey season—the team had a record of two wins and two losses—appeared in the college's 1916 yearbook. However, games from this era are not considered part of varsity history. In July 1923, the school was renamed the University of New Hampshire (UNH).

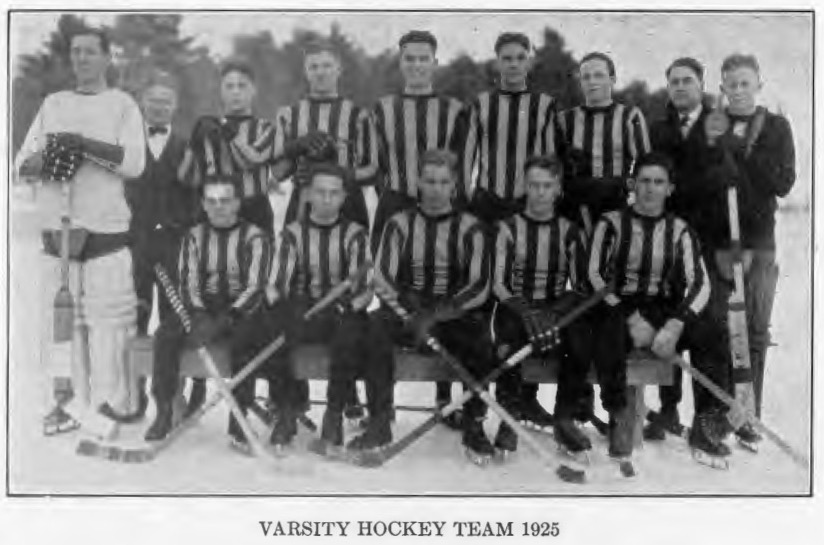
Team photo of the first varsity squad, which played its games in January and February 1925

The first UNH ice hockey team considered part of varsity history played in January and February 1925. The team won its first two games, on consecutive days, in away matches against Bates College and Colby College in Maine. A year later, under the stewardship of Ernest Christensen, UNH played its first home game on a local rink, an outdoor facility that was dependent on cold weather for its surface. The Wildcats played a small number of games for their first 15 seasons, fluctuating between an undefeated season in 1926–27 and a winless campaign in 1931–32.

In 1938, Christensen retired and the team eventually came under the tutelage of Anthony Dougal, but his tenure was suspended in 1943 due to the outbreak of World War II. The team finally returned to the ice in January 1947, with Dougal remaining for one year before handing the program over to Joseph Petroski. After four rather poor seasons, Horace "Pepper" Martin took over and New Hampshire's fortunes began to change. By the mid-1950s, the Wildcats started to play more and win more games than they ever had before. In 1955, an artificial ice rink was constructed on campus to help the team play more than a handful of home games.

=== ECAC ===
In 1961 New Hampshire was one of 28 schools that were founding members of ECAC Hockey. Martin turned the team over to A. Barr Snively and plans were underway to replace the Harry C. Batchelder Rink with an indoor ice rink. In the offseason of 1964, two events happened that hampered the ice hockey program. First, in April, head coach Snively suffered a heart attack and tragically died. With the school searching for a replacement the ECAC announced that it was dividing itself into two separate tiers. 'Major' programs would continue on with ECAC Hockey but 'minor' schools would be forced to join the newly-formed ECAC 2. Because their indoor facility had not yet been completed New Hampshire was forced out of the top tier. Rube Bjorkman was eventually named as head coach and he led the team for four years. During his tenure, the indoor arena was completed and christened as the Snively Arena after his late predecessor and a year later the program was readmitted into the top echelon of college hockey.

It was Bjorkman's successor, Charlie Holt, who put New Hampshire on the college hockey map. In Holt's first season UNH played its first postseason game, earning Holt his first of three Spencer Penrose Awards. In his first five seasons, the Wildcats finished with a winning record and then won the ECAC regular season championship in his sixth year. The Wildcats made their first NCAA appearance in 1977 and captured their first Conference championship two years later, but no matter how good Holt's teams were national success continued to elude him. under Holt the Wildcats went 0–6 in the frozen four and 2–8 in the tournament overall. While the wins started to come few and far between in the mid-1980s Holt continued to helm the program as it left ECAC Hockey to form Hockey East with six other northeastern schools.

=== Bob Kullen ===
Holt stepped down in 1986 and was replaced by long-time assistant Bob Kullen. In his first year the team saw marginal improvement but that summer Kullen was diagnosed with a rare form of heart disease that necessitated a transplant and his missing an entire season to recuperate. Dave O'Connor served as the interim head coach for 1987–88 allowing Kullen to return in the fall of '88. In two years New Hampshire saw its wins total improve to 12 and then 17 but by 1990 Kullen started rejecting his new heart and was forced to resign. Another UNH assistant, Dick Umile, was named as his replacement and unfortunately, Kullen died in November 1990 at the age of 41. Hockey East swiftly renamed its coach of the year award in his honor while the team continued the upward swing he began, allowing Umile to be the first recipient of the rechristened award.

=== Umile years ===
In Umile second season New Hampshire made the NCAA tournament for the first time in almost a decade and retroactively finished first in the conference after Maine was forced to forfeit 13 games. The team continued to play well for several seasons but after a disappointing season in 1996, the team won its first Hockey East Championship and set a new program record with 28 wins. The following year the Wildcats made the Frozen Four for the first time in 16 years and then reached even higher in 1999. in the penultimate year of the millennium the Wildcats won 30 games for the first time, establishing a still-record of 31 victories (as of 2019), winning their second conference title (first outright) and were led by sophomore goaltender Ty Conklin and senior center Jason Krog, the latter won the NCAA scoring title by 16 points and captured the Hobey Baker Award (UNH's only recipient as of 2019). Despite losing in the Hockey East tournament finale The team received the #2 overall seed and a bye into the second round. The Wildcats defeated two Michigan schools to reach their first national championship game where they would ultimately fall in overtime to conference rival Maine.

UNH would continue to be a power in Hockey East, winning back to back conference championships in 2002 and 2003 and reached their second NCAA title game in '03 where they lost to Minnesota, 5–1. UNH would make the NCAA tournament every year from 2002 through 2011 but the team could not make it out of the Regionals after 2003. Starting in 2012 the program began a slow decline, ending up dead-last in the conference in 2017–18. After that season Umile decided to retire, leaving the school as the all-time leader in just about every coaching category and recording the third most wins all-time for one school at the Division I level.

Umile's final act for the program was to name his successor, allowing 1999 alumnus Michael Souza to become the 14th head coach in program history.

=== John "Jack" French ===
After his tour of duty in the US Navy, he worked at the UNH as the Athletic Equipment Manager for a total of 38 years from 1963 to 2001. He was beloved by the students and staff and holds the record for most games attended including hockey, football, baseball and basketball. He was a member of the Athletic Equipment Managers Association.

== Head coaches ==
As of the completion of 2024–25 season

Tenure	Coach	Years	Record	Pct.
1924–1925	Hank Swasey	1	2–2–0	.500
1925–1936, 1937–1938	Ernest Christensen	12	55–54–8	.504
1936–1937	Carl Lundholm	1	3–5–0	.375
1938–1939	George Thurston	1	5–4–0	.556
1939–1943, 1946–1947	Anthony Dougal	5	15–28–0	.349
1947–1951	Joseph Petroski	4	9–20–0	.310
1951–1962	Horace "Pepper" Martin	11	76–76–3	.500
1962–1964	A. Barr Snively	2	23–22–0	.511
1964–1968	Rube Bjorkman	4	57–40–0	.588
1968–1986	Charlie Holt	18	347–232–18	.596
1986–1987, 1988–1990	Bob Kullen	4	37–66–8	.369
1987–1988	Dave O'Connor	1	7–20–3	.283
1990–2018	Dick Umile	28	598–375–114	.603
2018–Present	Michael Souza	7	91–118–27	.443
Totals	14 coaches	99 seasons	1,325–1,055–181	.553

== Statistical leaders ==
=== Career points leaders ===
Player	Years	GP	G	A	Pts	PIM
Ralph Cox	1975–1979	128	127	116	243	
Jason Krog	1995–1999	151	94	144	238	
Darren Haydar	1998–2002	158	102	117	219	
Jamie Hislop	1972–1976	119	77	132	209	
Mark Mowers	1994–1998	144	85	112	197	
Louis Frigon	1967–1971	89	98	95	193	
Bob Gould	1975–1979	135	91	101	192	
Cliff Cox	1972–1976	108	87	88	175	
Jon Fontas	1974–1978	107	72	102	174	
Frank Roy	1975–1979	131	71	103	174	
Joe Flanagan	1988–1992	140	85	89	174	

=== Career goaltending leaders ===
GP = Games played; Min = Minutes played; W = Wins; L = Losses; T = Ties; GA = Goals against; SO = Shutouts; SV% = Save percentage; GAA = Goals against average

minimum 30 games played

Player	Years	GP	Min	W	L	T	GA	SO	SV%	GAA
Ty Conklin	1998–2001	93	5580	57	23	12	202	1	.915	2.18
Kevin Regan	2004–2008	112	6599	70	29	10	250	9	.928	2.27
Casey DeSmith	2011–2014	97	5637	48	36	8	218	9	.923	2.32
Jeff Pietrasiak	2002–2006	55	2904	27	13	6	119	2	.917	2.46
Mike Ayers	2000–2004	102	5755	58	25	12	239	12	.914	2.49

Statistics current through the start of the 2019–20 season.

== Current roster ==
As of August 14, 2025.

No.	Nat.	Player	Class	Pos	Height	Weight	DoB	Hometown	Previous team	NHL rights
1	(Canada)	Kristian Coombs	Freshman	G	6' 2" (1.88 m)	185 lb (84 kg)	2005-06-25	Calgary, Alberta	Melfort Mustangs (SJHL)	—
2	(Canada)	Alex Carr	Freshman	D	6' 0" (1.83 m)	194 lb (88 kg)	2004-03-20	Middle Sackville, Nova Scotia	Rouyn-Noranda Huskies (QMJHL)	—
4	(United States)	Ryan Philbrick	Freshman	D	5' 11" (1.8 m)	181 lb (82 kg)	2004-07-20	Concord, New Hampshire	Salmon Arm Silverbacks (BCHL)	—
5	(United States)	Zach Hahn	Junior	D	6' 2" (1.88 m)	205 lb (93 kg)	2002-08-06	Huntington, New York	P.A.L. Jr. Islanders (NCDC)	—
6	(Latvia)	Marty Laviņš	Junior	F	6' 1" (1.85 m)	185 lb (84 kg)	2003-04-10	Riga, Latvia	Cedar Rapids RoughRiders (USHL)	—
7	(Canada)	Ryan MacPherson	Sophomore	F	6' 1" (1.85 m)	185 lb (84 kg)	2005-03-02	Windsor, Ontario	Penticton Vees (BCHL)	PHI, 172nd overall 2023
8	(United States)	Reid Conn	Freshman	D	6' 4" (1.93 m)	209 lb (95 kg)	2004-02-04	Centennial, Colorado	Chicago Steel (USHL)	—
9	(United States)	Jack Cronin	Graduate	F	5' 11" (1.8 m)	185 lb (84 kg)	2001-03-31	South Hamilton, Massachusetts	Princeton (ECAC)	—
10	(United States)	Ronan Walsh	Junior	F	6' 4" (1.93 m)	210 lb (95 kg)	2002-05-03	Andover, New Hampshire	Amarillo Wranglers (NAHL)	—
11	(United States)	Connor DeTurris	Freshman	F	6' 1" (1.85 m)	185 lb (84 kg)	2004-10-08	Naperville, Illinois	Nanaimo Clippers (BCHL)	—
13	(United States)	Josh Player	Sophomore	D	6' 0" (1.83 m)	190 lb (86 kg)	2005-05-13	Thorofare, New Jersey	Green Bay Gamblers (USHL)	—
15	(Canada)	Oscar Plandowski	Sophomore	D	6' 0" (1.83 m)	190 lb (86 kg)	2003-05-18	Red Deer, Alberta	New Brunswick (AUS)	DET, 155th overall 2021
16	(United States)	J. P. Turner	Junior	F	6' 0" (1.83 m)	195 lb (88 kg)	2003-01-31	East Falmouth, Massachusetts	Fargo Force (USHL)	—
17	(Latvia)	Kristaps Skrastiņš	Senior	F	5' 10" (1.78 m)	180 lb (82 kg)	2001-11-20	Grobiņa, Latvia	Amarillo Wranglers (NAHL)	—
19	(United States)	Brendan Fitzgerald	Junior	D	6' 0" (1.83 m)	165 lb (75 kg)	2003-03-06	North Reading, Massachusetts	Cedar Rapids RoughRiders (USHL)	—
22	(Canada)	Félix Gagnon	Freshman	F	6' 0" (1.83 m)	174 lb (79 kg)	2004-06-10	Saguenay, Quebec	Chicoutimi Saguenéens (QMJHL)	—
23	(United States)	Jason Siedem	Junior	F	5' 10" (1.78 m)	185 lb (84 kg)	2002-10-17	Madison, New Jersey	Blackfalds Bulldogs (AJHL)	—
26	(United States)	Morgan Winters	Senior	F	5' 11" (1.8 m)	165 lb (75 kg)	2001-12-08	Osprey, Florida	Omaha Lancers (USHL)	—
29	(United States)	Cy LeClerc	Senior	F	5' 9" (1.75 m)	180 lb (82 kg)	2002-08-17	Brentwood, New Hampshire	Janesville Jets (NAHL)	—
36	(United States)	Kyle Chauvette	Senior	G	6' 1" (1.85 m)	170 lb (77 kg)	2001-10-05	Goffstown, New Hampshire	Union (ECAC)	—
37	(United States)	Nick Ring	Junior	F	5' 10" (1.78 m)	180 lb (82 kg)	2003-10-26	Abington, Massachusetts	Sioux Falls Stampede (USHL)	—
41	(Canada)	Jared Whale	Senior	G	5' 11" (1.8 m)	195 lb (88 kg)	2002-11-01	Calgary, Alberta	Alaska Anchorage (NCAA)	—
47	(Canada)	Sam Oliver	Freshman	F	5' 11" (1.8 m)	183 lb (83 kg)	2004-07-04	Quispamsis, New Brunswick	Drummondville Voltigeurs (QMJHL)	—
61	(Canada)	Cam MacDonald	Sophomore	F	6' 2" (1.88 m)	194 lb (88 kg)	2003-05-04	Toronto, Ontario	Acadia (AUS)	TBL, 160th overall 2021
72	(United States)	Conner de Haro	Freshman	D	5' 11" (1.8 m)	192 lb (87 kg)	2005-10-17	Raleigh, North Carolina	Youngstown Phantoms (USHL)	—
91	(Canada)	Jacob Newcombe	Freshman	F	6' 0" (1.83 m)	203 lb (92 kg)	2004-04-27	Halifax, Nova Scotia	Cape Breton Eagles (QMJHL)	—
95	(Canada)	Nick De Angelis	Freshman	D	6' 2" (1.88 m)	187 lb (85 kg)	2004-05-22	King City, Ontario	Sudbury Wolves (OHL)	—

== Awards and honors ==
=== Hockey Hall of Fame ===
- Rod Langway (2002)

=== United States Hockey Hall of Fame ===
- Charlie Holt (1997)
- Rod Langway (1999)

=== NCAA ===
==== Individual awards ====
Hobey Baker Award

- Jason Krog: 1999

Spencer Penrose Award

- Charlie Holt: 1969, 1974, 1979
- Dick Umile: 1999

NCAA Scoring Champion

- Louis Frigon: 1971
- Jason Krog: 1999
- Tyler Kelleher: 2017

==== All-American teams ====
AHCA First Team All-Americans

- 1960–61: Rod Blackburn, G
- 1972–73: Gordie Clark, F
- 1973–74: Cap Raeder, G; Gordie Clark, F
- 1975–76: Cliff Cox, F; Jamie Hislop, F
- 1976–77: Tim Burke, D; Bob Miller, F
- 1977–78: Ralph Cox, F
- 1978–79: Ralph Cox, F
- 1981–82: Andy Brickley, F
- 1997–98: Mark Mowers, F
- 1998–99: Jason Krog, F
- 2000–01: Ty Conklin, G
- 2001–02: Darren Haydar, F; Colin Hemingway, F
- 2003–04: Steve Saviano, F
- 2004–05: Sean Collins, F
- 2007–08: Kevin Regan, G; Mike Radja, F
- 2009–10: Bobby Butler, F
- 2010–11: Blake Kessel, D; Paul Thompson, F
- 2012–13: Trevor van Riemsdyk, F
- 2015–16: Andrew Poturalski, F

AHCA Second Team All-Americans

- 1990–91: Jeff Levy, G
- 1991–92: Domenic Amodeo, F
- 1996–97: Tim Murray, D; Jason Krog, F
- 1998-99: Jayme Filipowicz, D
- 1999–00: Ty Conklin, G
- 2002–03: Mike Ayers, G; Lanny Gare, F; Colin Hemingway, F
- 2004–05: Brian Yandle, D
- 2005–06: Brian Yandle, D
- 2006–07: Trevor Smith, D
- 2007–08: Brad Flaishans, D; Matt Fornataro, F
- 2009–10: Brian Foster, G; Blake Kessel, D
- 2016–17: Tyler Kelleher, F

=== ECAC Hockey ===
==== Individual awards ====
Player of the Year

- Ralph Cox, C: 1979

Rookie of the Year

- Bob Miller, F: 1975
- Normand Lacombe, RW: 1982

Most Outstanding Player in Tournament

- Greg Moffett, G: 1979

==== All-Conference teams ====
First Team All-ECAC Hockey

- 1971–72: Gordie Clark, F; Guy Smith, F
- 1972–73: Gordie Clark, F
- 1973–74: Gordie Clark, F
- 1974–75: Jamie Hislop, F
- 1975–76: Jamie Hislop, F
- 1976–77: Bob Miller, F
- 1977–78: Ralph Cox, F
- 1978–79: Ralph Cox, F
- 1981–82: Andy Brickley, F
- 1997–98: Mark Mowers, F
- 1998–99: Jason Krog, F
- 2000–01: Ty Conklin, G
- 2001–02: Darren Haydar, F; Colin Hemingway, F
- 2003–04: Steve Saviano, F
- 2004–05: Sean Collins, F
- 2007–08: Kevin Regan, G; Mike Radja, F
- 2009–10: Bobby Butler, F
- 2010–11: Blake Kessel, D; Paul Thompson, F
- 2012–13: Trevor van Riemsdyk, F
- 2015–16: Andrew Poturalski, F

Second Team All-ECAC Hockey

- 1968–69: Rick Metzer, G
- 1973–74: Cap Raeder, G
- 1975–76: Cliff Cox, F; Tim Burke, F
- 1976–77: Tim Burke, D
- 1978–79: Greg Moffett, G; Bob Gould, F
- 1982–83: Normand Lacombe, F
- 1983–84: Bruce Gillies, G; Brian Byrnes, D

=== Hockey East ===
==== Individual awards ====
Player of the Year

- Jason Krog: 1999
- Ty Conklin: 2000
- Darren Haydar: 2002
- Mike Ayers: 2003
- Steve Saviano: 2004
- Kevin Regan: 2008
- Bobby Butler: 2010
- Paul Thompson: 2011

Rookie of the Year

- Jeff Levy: 1991
- Mark Mowers: 1995
- Darren Haydar: 1999
- Sean Collins: 2002

Best Defensive Forward

- John Sadowski: 2000
- Preston Callander: 2005

Len Ceglarski Award

- Joe Flanagan: 1992
- Todd Hall: 1996
- Steve Saviano: 2004
- Jackson Pierson: 2022

Best Defensive Defenseman

- Steve O'Brien: 1999
- Joe Charlebois: 2008

Three-Stars Award

- Colin Hemingway: 2002
- Bobby Butler: 2010
- Paul Thompson: 2011
- John Henrion: 2013
- Tyler Kelleher: 2017

Coach of the Year

- Dick Umile: 1991, 1997, 1999, 2002, 2007, 2010

Tournament Most Valuable Player

- Darren Haydar: 2002

==== All-Conference teams ====
First Team All-Hockey East

- 1994–95: Eric Flinton, F
- 1995–96: Todd Hall, D; Mark Mowers, F
- 1996–97: Tim Murray, D; Eric Boguniecki, F; Mark Mowers, F; Jason Krog, F
- 1997–98: Jason Krog, F
- 1998–99: Jayme Filipowicz, D; Jason Krog, F
- 1999–00: Ty Conklin, G
- 2000–01: Ty Conklin, G
- 2001–02: Darren Haydar, F; Colin Hemingway, F
- 2002–03: Mike Ayers, G; Lanny Gare, F
- 2003–04: Steve Saviano, F
- 2006–07: Trevor Smith, F
- 2007–08: Kevin Regan, G; Brad Flaishans, D; Mike Radja, F
- 2009–10: Brian Foster, G; Blake Kessel, D; Bobby Butler, F
- 2010–11: Blake Kessel, D; Paul Thompson, F
- 2012–13: Trevor van Riemsdyk, D
- 2015–16: Andrew Poturalski, F
- 2016–17: Tyler Kelleher, F

Second Team All-Hockey East

- 1990–91: Jeff Levy, G
- 1991–92: Scott Morrow, F
- 1992–93: Rob Donovan, F
- 1997–98: Derek Bekar, F; Mark Mowers, F
- 1998-99: Ty Conklin, G; Darren Haydar, F
- 1999–00: Michael Souza, F; Darren Haydar, F
- 2001–02: Mike Ayers, G; Garrett Stafford, D
- 2002–03: Colin Hemingway, F
- 2004–05: Brian Yandle, D; Sean Collins, F
- 2005–06: Brian Yandle, D; Daniel Winnik, F
- 2006–07: Chris Murray, D
- 2007–08: Craig Switzer, D; Matt Fornataro, F
- 2008–09: James van Riemsdyk, F
- 2013–14: Eric Knodel, D; Kevin Goumas, F
- 2016–17: Tyler Kelleher, F

Third Team All-Hockey East

- 2023–24: Alex Gagne, D

Hockey East All-Rookie Team

- 1984–85: Stephen Leach, F
- 1987–88: Pat Morrison, G; Chris Winnes, F
- 1990–91: Jeff Levy, G
- 1993–94: Tim Murray, D; Eric Boguniecki, F
- 1994–95: Mark Mowers, F
- 1995–96: Derek Bekar, F
- 1996–97: Sean Matile, G; Michael Souza, F
- 1997–98: Matthias Trattnig, F
- 1998–99: Ty Conklin, G; Darren Haydar, F
- 2001–02: Sean Collins, F
- 2003–04: Brett Hemingway, F
- 2004–05: Kevin Regan, G
- 2007–08: James van Riemsdyk, F
- 2011–12: Casey DeSmith, G; Trevor van Riemsdyk, D
- 2016–17: Patrick Grasso, F

== Program Records ==
=== Hockey East ===
==== Individual ====
- Most Career Short-Handed Goals: Mark Mowers; 8
- Longest Goalie Win Streak: Kevin Regan; 11

== Olympians ==
This is a list of New Hampshire alumni were a part of an Olympic team.

Name	Position	New Hampshire Tenure	Team	Year	Finish
Bob Miller	Center	1974–1975, 1976–1977	(United States) USA	1976	5th
Steve Leach	Right Wing	1984–1986	(United States) USA	1988	7th
Adrien Plavsic	Defenseman	1987–1988	(Canada) CAN	1992	Silver
Jeff Lazaro	Right Wing	1986–1990	(United States) USA	1994	8th
James van Riemsdyk	Left Wing	2007–2009	(United States) USA	2014	4th
Bobby Butler	Right Wing	2006–2010	(United States) USA	2018	7th
Daniel Winnik	Forward	2003–2006	(Canada) CAN	2022	6th

== New Hampshire Wildcats Hall of Fame ==
The following is a list of people associated with the New Hampshire men's ice hockey program who were elected into the New Hampshire Wildcats Hall of Fame (induction date in parentheses).

- Gordie Clark (1982)
- Ernest Christensen (1982)
- Rod Blackburn (1983)
- Cliff Cox (1983)
- Jamie Hislop (1983)
- A. Barr Snively (1983)
- Hank Swasey (1983)
- Tim Burke (1984)
- Louis Frigon (1985)
- Russell Martin (1986)
- Roger Magenau (1986)
- Josiah Bartlett (1986)
- Ralph Cox (1986)
- Howard Hanley (1987)
- Graham Bruder (1987)
- John Gray (1987)
- Bob Gould (1988)
- William Weir (1989)
- Cap Raeder (1989)
- Charlie Holt (1989)
- Mickey Goulet (1990)
- Rod Langway (1990)
- Albert Brodeur (1991)
- J. Allan Clark (1991)
- Edward Noel (1991)
- Greg Moffett (1992)
- Horace "Pepper" Martin (1993)
- R. Braden Houston (1993)
- Frank Roy (1993)
- Dick Umile (1994)
- Bob Miller (1994)
- Donald Perkins (1995)
- Michael Ontkean (1995)
- Herbert Merrill (1996)
- Raymond March Jr. (1996)
- Guy Smith (1996)
- Dave Lumley (1997)
- Raymond Patten (1997)
- Andy Brickley (1998)
- Kenneth McKinnon (1999)
- Bob Towse (2000)
- Richard David (2000)
- Kevin Dean (2000)
- Bob Towse (2000)
- Don Otis (2001)
- Peter Van Buskirk (2001)
- Paul Powers (2003)
- Jason Krog (2005)
- Mark Mowers (2006)
- Ty Conklin (2008)
- Dave O'Connor (2008)
- Darren Haydar (2012)

== Wildcats in the NHL ==
As of July 1, 2025.

= NHL All-Star team	= NHL All-Star	= NHL All-Star and NHL All-Star team	= Hall of Famers

Player	Position	Team(s)	Years	Games	Stanley Cups
Derek Bekar	Center	STL, LAK, NYI	1999–2004	11	0
Eric Boguniecki	Center	FLA, STL, PIT, NYI	1999–2007	178	0
Andy Brickley	Left Wing	PHI, PIT, NJD, BOS, WPG	1982–1994	385	0
Gary Burns	Forward	NYR	1980–1982	11	0
Bobby Butler	Right Wing	OTT, NJD, NSH, FLA	2009–2014	130	0
Matt Campanale	Defenseman	NYI	2010–2011	1	0
Gordie Clark	Right Wing	BOS	1974–1976	8	0
Ty Conklin	Goaltender	EDM, CBJ, BUF, PIT, DET, STL	2001–2012	216	0
Angus Crookshank	Left Wing	OTT	2023–Present	21	0
Bruce Crowder	Forward	BOS, PIT	1981–1985	243	0
Kevin Dean	Defenseman	NJD, ATL, DAL, CHI	1994–2001	331	1
Casey DeSmith	Goaltender	PIT, VAN, DAL	2017–Present	192	0
Peter Douris	Right Wing	WPG, BOS, ANA, DAL	1985–1998	321	0
Warren Foegele	Left Wing	CAR, EDM, LAK	2017–Present	513	0
Jon Fontas	Center	MNS	1979–1981	2	0
Brian Foster	Goaltender	FLA	2011–2012	1	0
Bobby Francis	Center	DET	1982–1983	14	0
Jamie Fritsch	Defenseman	PHI	2008–2009	1	0
Bobby Gould	Left Wing	ATF, CGY, WSH, BOS	1979–1990	697	0
Darren Haydar	Right Wing	NSH, ATL, COL	2002–2010	23	0
Colin Hemingway	Forward	STL	2005–2006	3	0
Jamie Hislop	Forward	QUE, CGY	1979–1984	345	0
Jason Krog	Left Wing	NYI, ANA, ATL, NYR, VAN	1999–2010	202	0
Normand Lacombe	Right Wing	BUF, EDM, PHI	1984–1991	319	1

Player	Position	Team(s)	Years	Games	Stanley Cups
Rod Langway	Defenseman	MTL, WSH	1978–1993	994	1
Jeff Lazaro	Right Wing	BOS, OTT	1990–1993	102	0
Steve Leach	Right Wing	WSH, BOS, STL, CAR, OTT, PHO, PIT	1985–2000	702	0
Peter LeBlanc	Left Wing	WSH	2013–2014	1	0
Dave Lumley	Forward	MTL, EDM, HFD	1978–1987	437	2
Bob Miller	Wing	BOS, COR, LAK	1977–1985	404	0
Jay Miller	Left Wing	BOS, LAK	1985–1992	446	0
Scott Morrow	Left Wing	CGY	1994–1995	4	0
Mark Mowers	Center	NSH, DET, BOS, ANA	1998–2008	277	0
Bryan Muir	Defenseman	EDM, NJD, CHI, TBL, COL, LAK, WSH	1995–2007	279	1
Eric Nickulas	Right Wing	BOS, STL, CHI	1998–2006	118	0
Brett Pesce	Defenseman	CAR, NJD	2015–Present	699	0
Adrien Plavsic	Defenseman	STL, VAN, TBL, ANA	1989–1997	214	0
Andrew Poturalski	Forward	CAR, SEA, SJS	2016–Present	9	0
Chris Pryor	Defenseman	MNS, NYI	1984–1990	82	0
Mike Sislo	Right Wing	NJD	2013–2016	42	0
Trevor Smith	Center	NYI, TBL, PIT, TOR, NSH	2008–2017	107	0
Garrett Stafford	Defenseman	DET, DAL, PHO	2007–2011	7	0
Paul Thompson	Right Wing	NJD, FLA	2015–2017	24	0
James van Riemsdyk	Left Wing	PHI, TOR, BOS, CBJ	2009–Present	1,082	0
Trevor van Riemsdyk	Defenseman	CHI , CAR, WSH	2014–Present	683	1
Chris Winnes	Right Wing	BOS, PHI	1990–1994	33	0
Daniel Winnik	Left Wing	PHO, COL, SJS, ANA, TOR, PIT, WSH, MIN	2007–2018	798	0

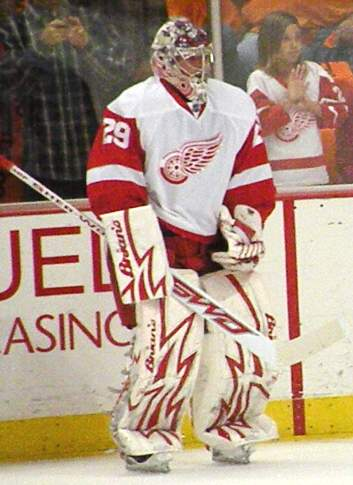
Ty Conklin

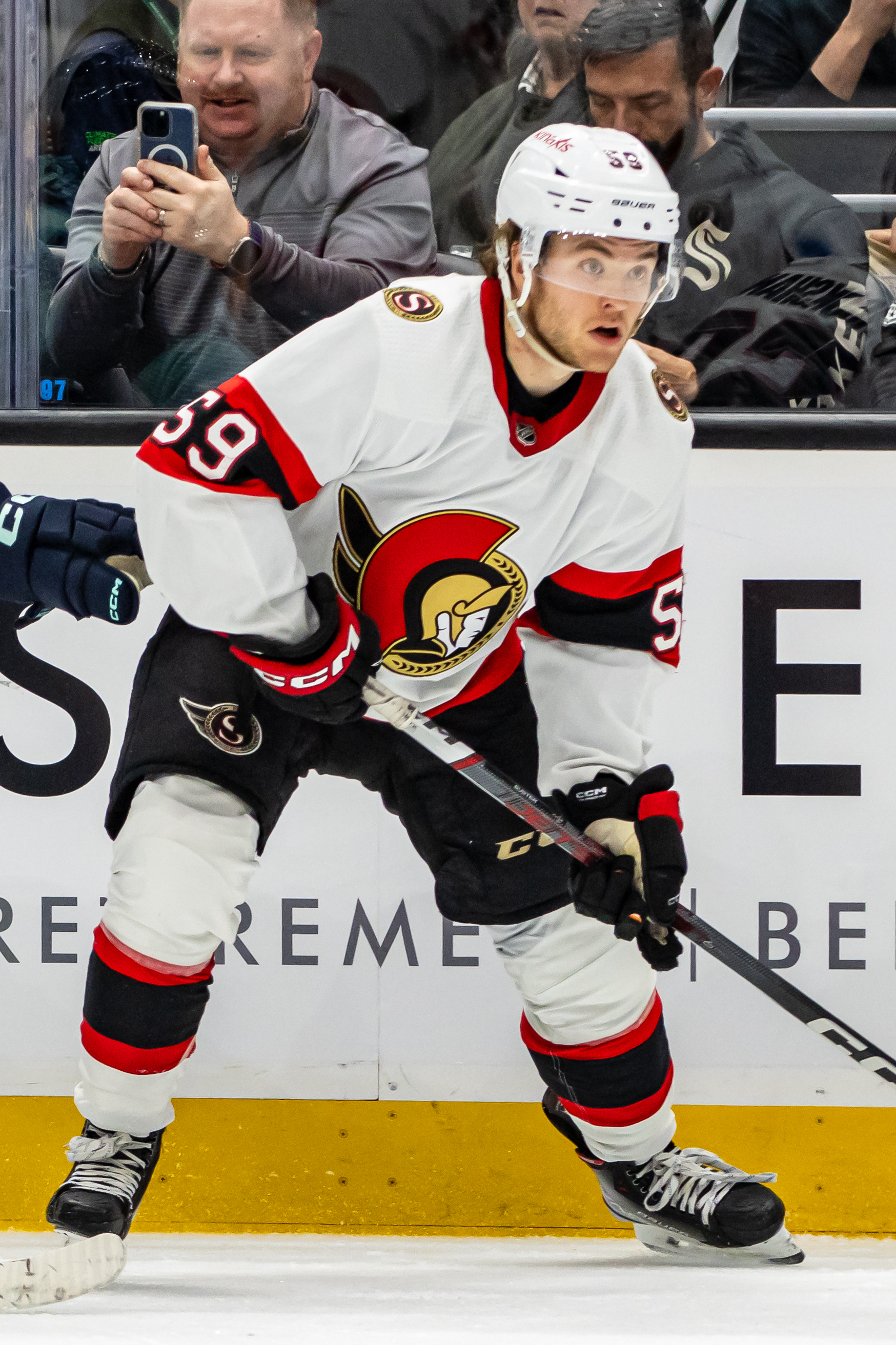
Angus Crookshank

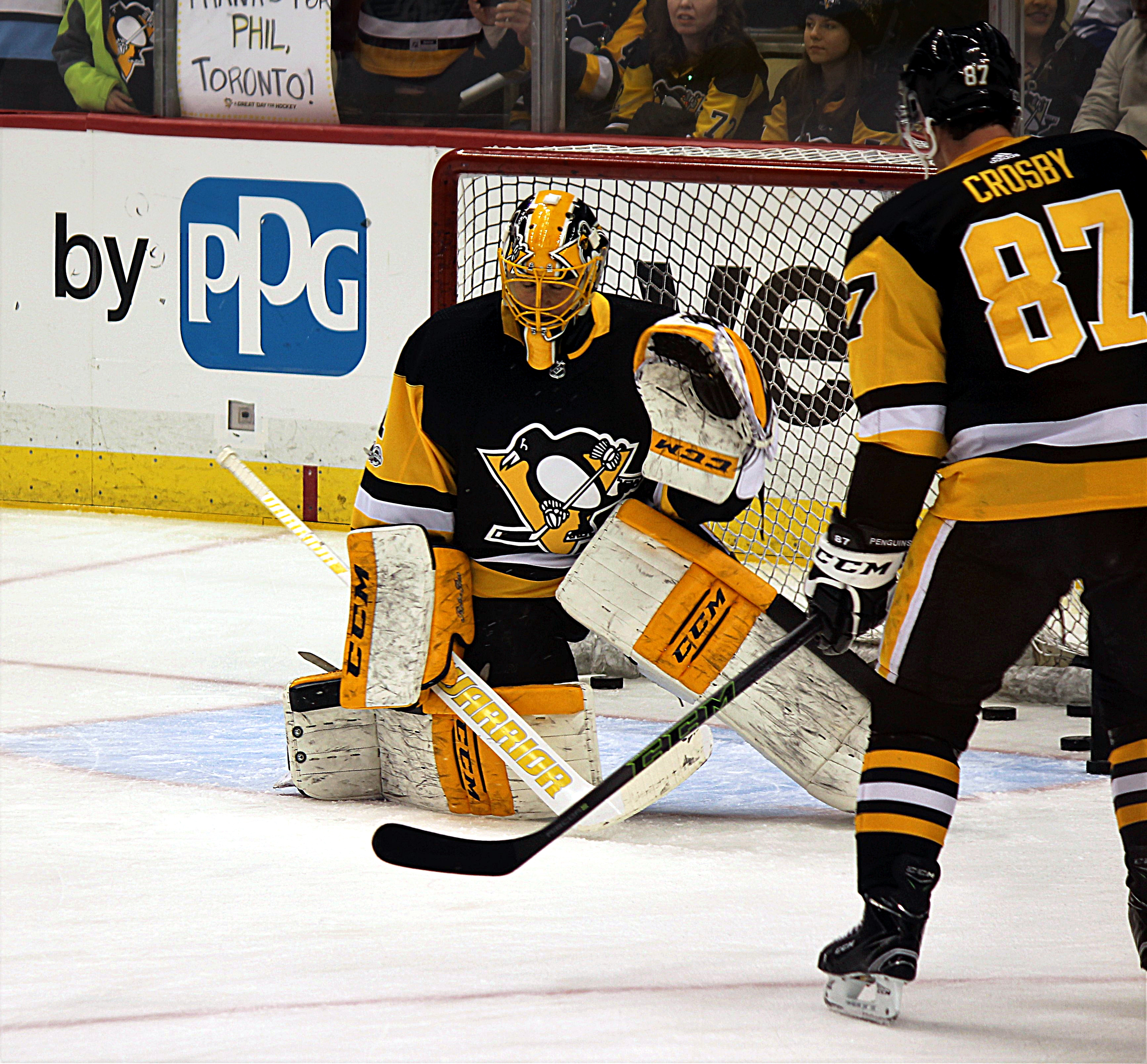
Casey DeSmith

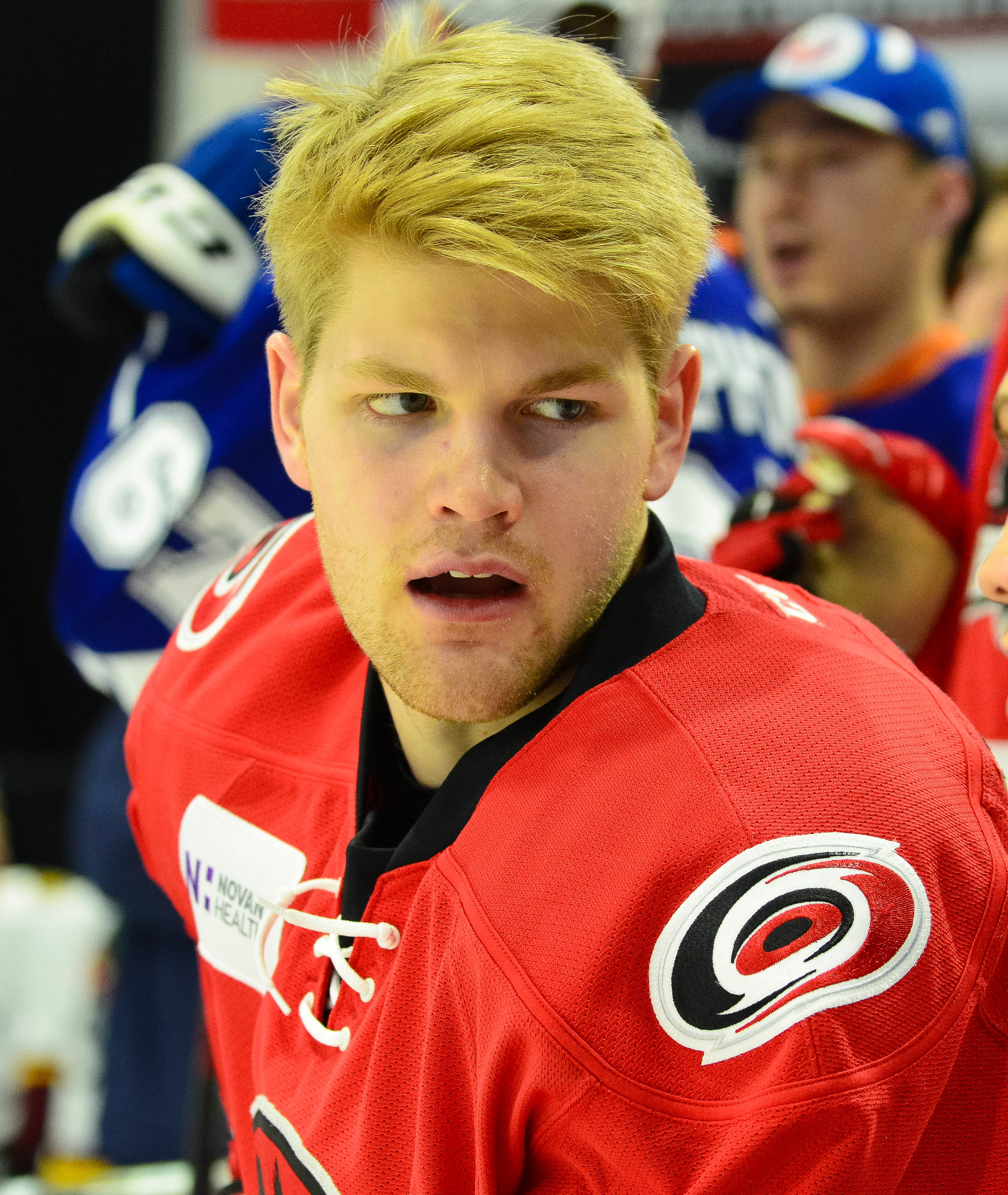
Warren Foegele

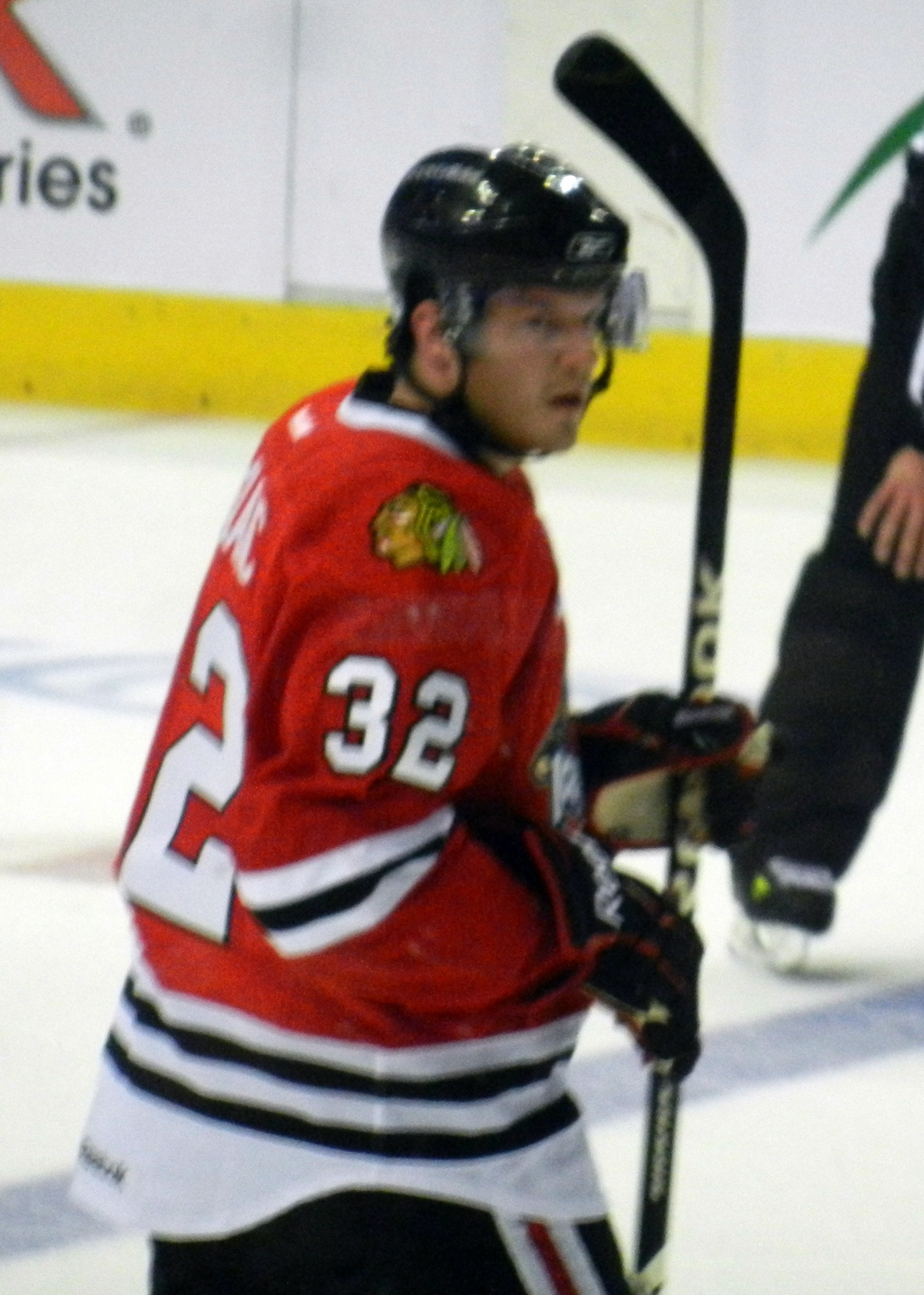
Peter LeBlanc

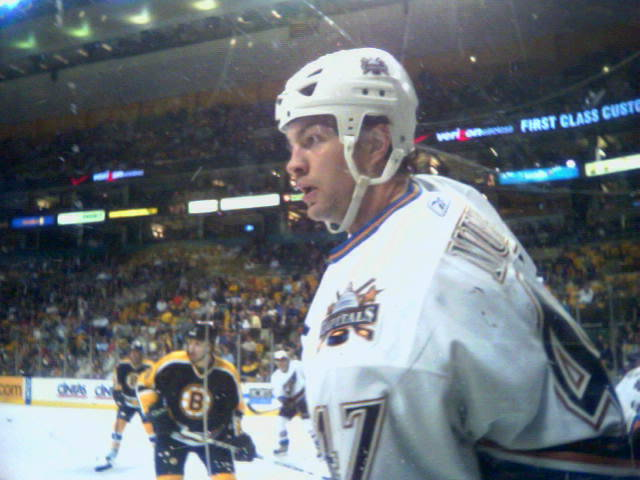
Bryan Muir

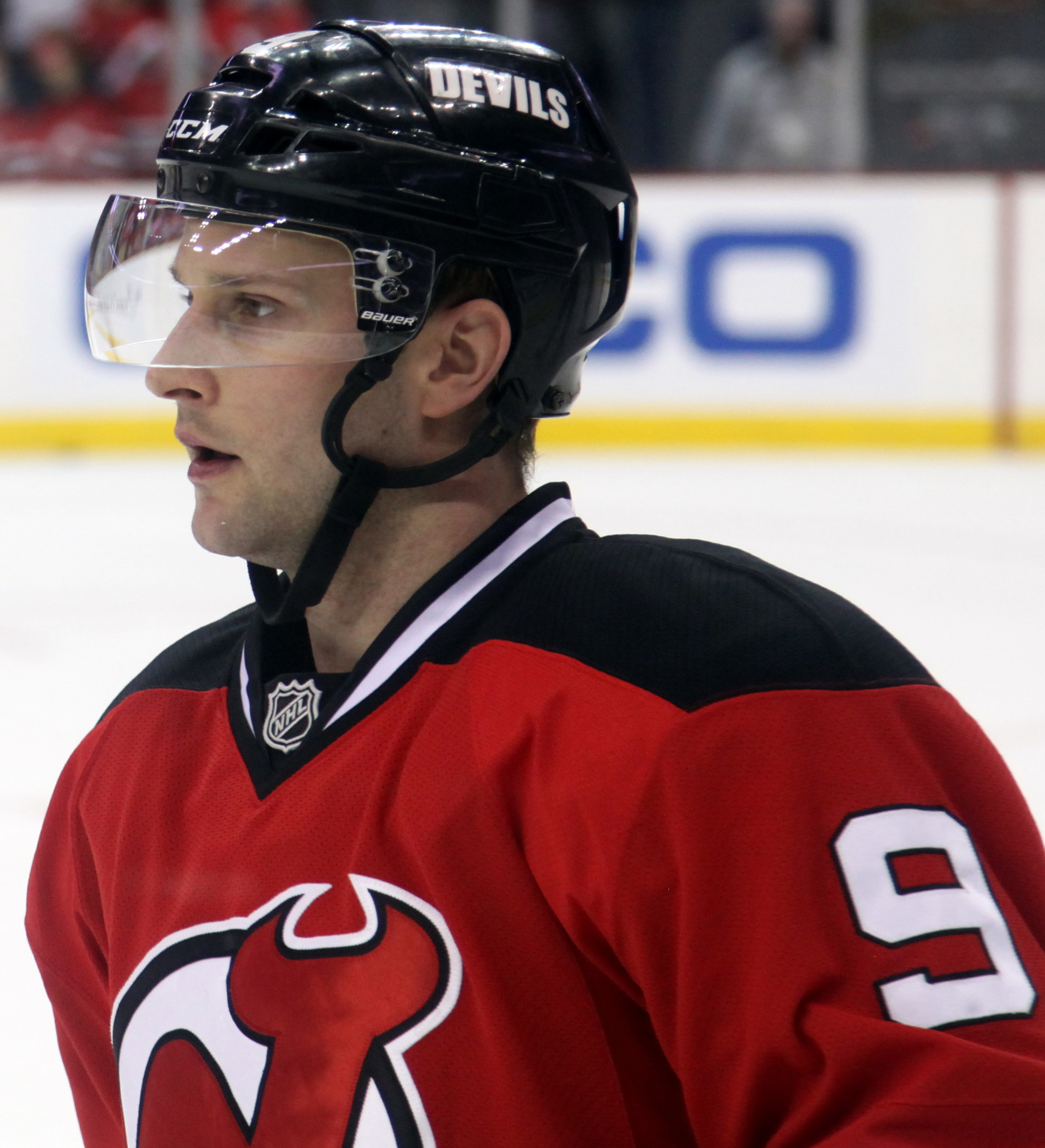
Mike Sislo

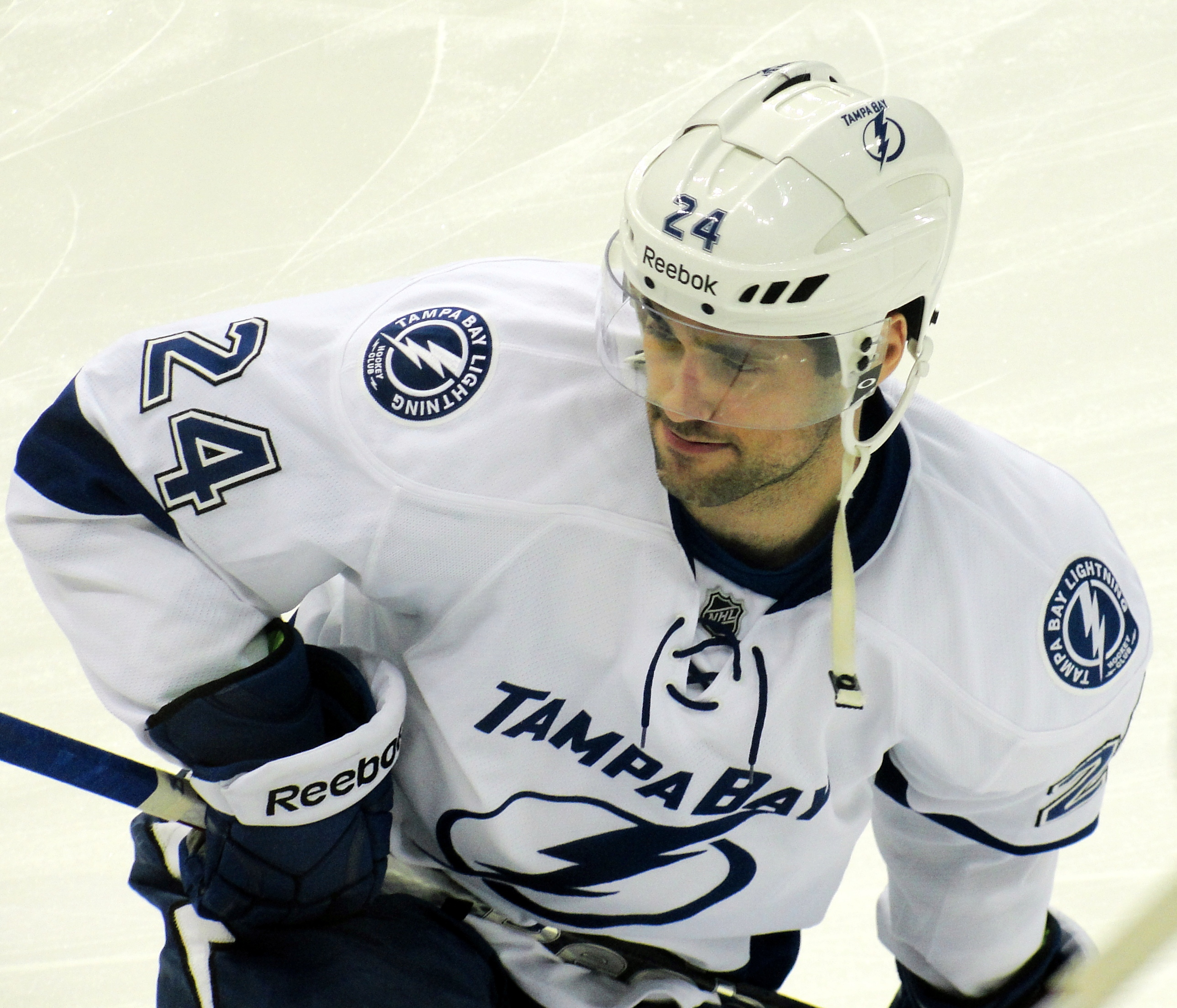
Trevor Smith

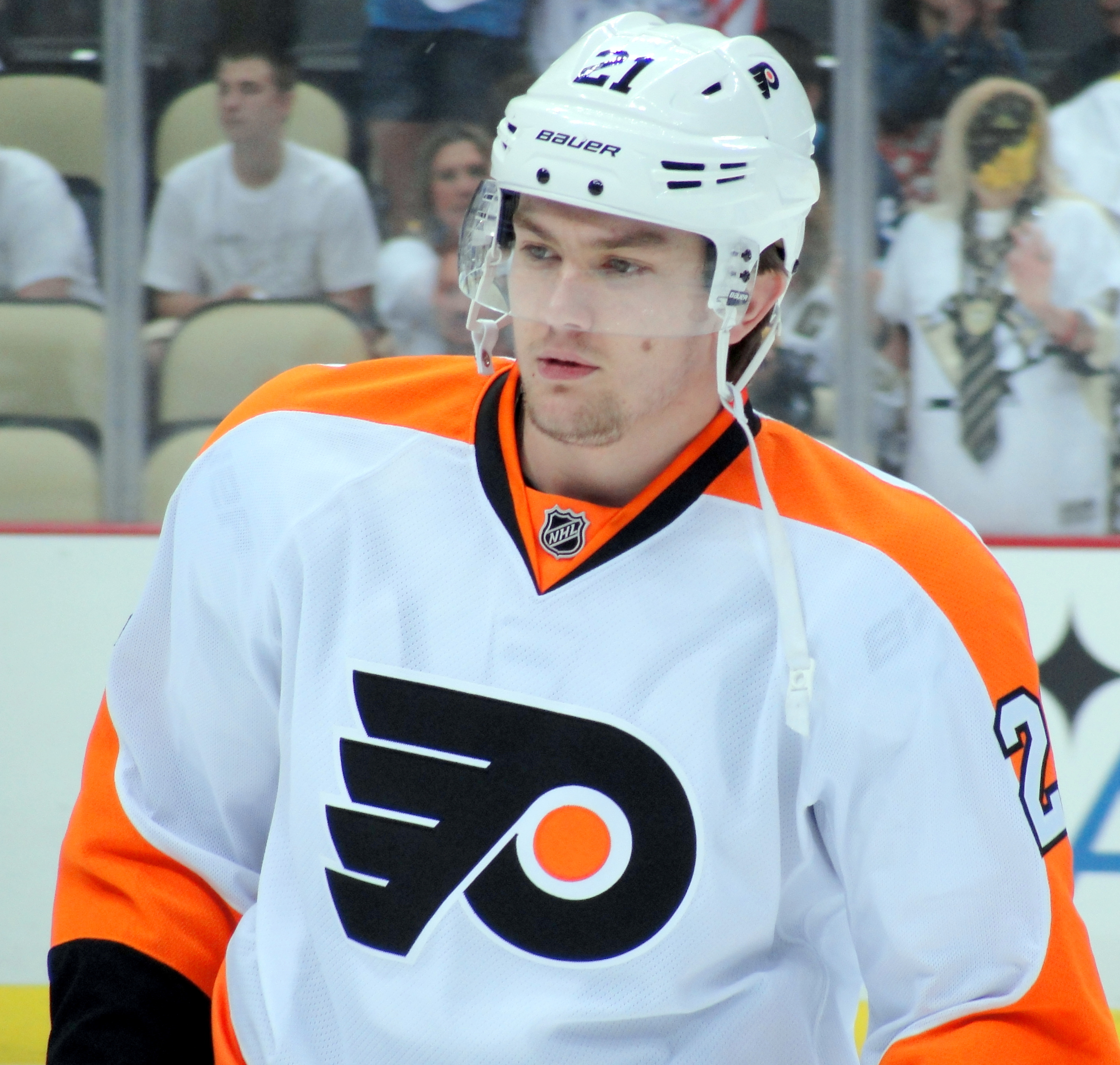
James van Riemsdyk

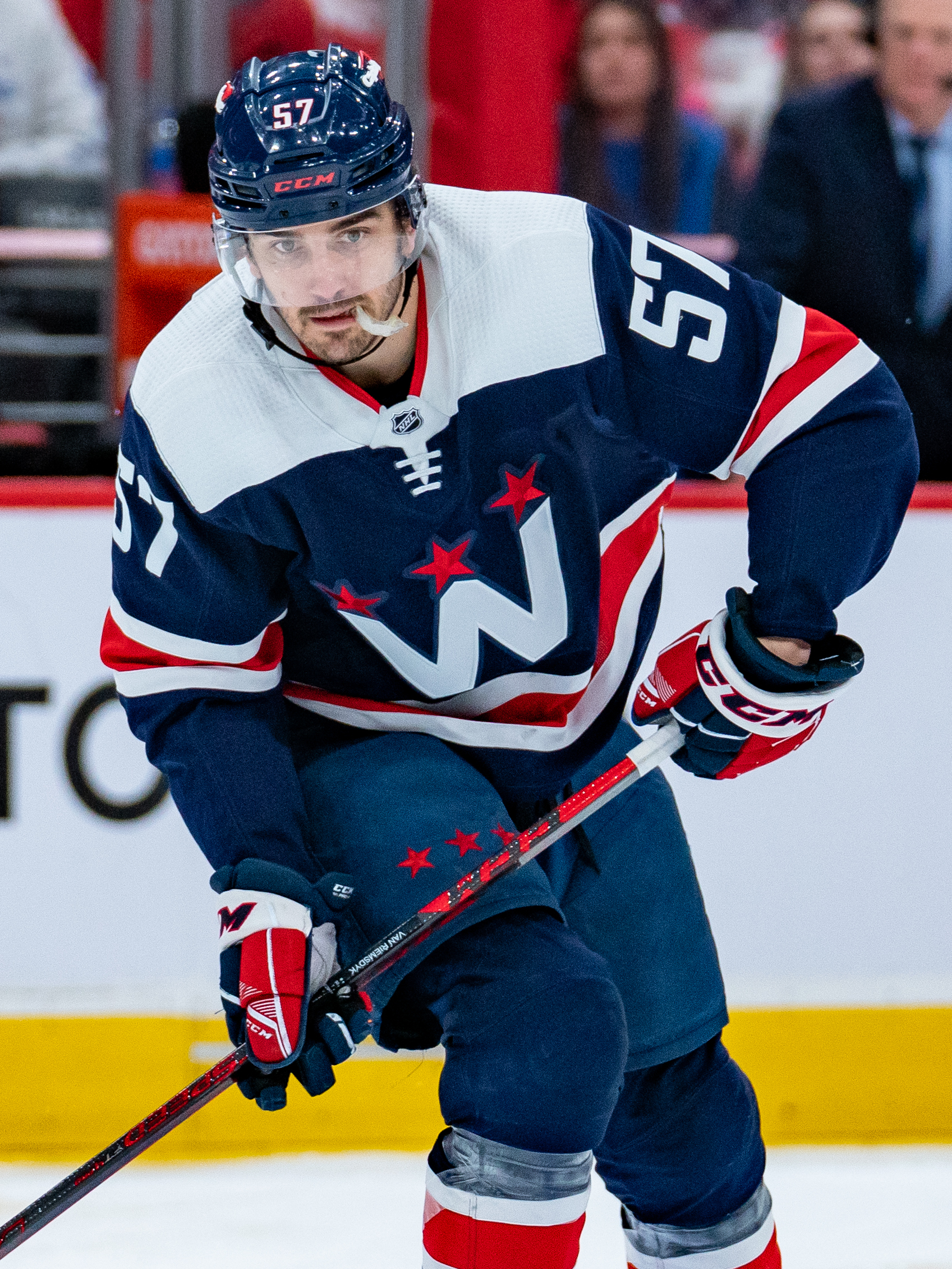
Trevor van Riemsdyk

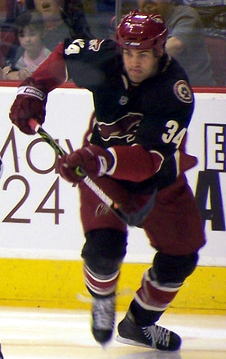
Daniel Winnik

=== WHA ===
Several players also were members of WHA teams.

Player	Position	Team(s)	Years	Avco Cups
Gordie Clark	Right Wing	CIN	1978–1979	0
John Gray	Center	PHX, HOU, WIN	1974–1979	1
Jamie Hislop	Forward	CIN	1976–1979	0
Gary Jacquith	Defenseman	SDM	1975–1976	0
Rod Langway	Defenseman	BIR	1977–1978	0
Cap Raeder	Goaltender	NEW	1975–1977	0
Guy Smith	Left Wing	NEW	1972–1974	1

== See also ==
- New Hampshire Wildcats women's ice hockey
- New Hampshire Wildcats
- New Hampshire–Dartmouth rivalry
- New Hampshire–Maine hockey rivalry
