= 1998–99 Maine Black Bears men's ice hockey season =

NCAA Division I National Champions JCPenney Classic, champion Governor's Cup, champion NCAA Tournament, champion
- Conference: 2nd Hockey East
- Home ice: Alfond Arena

Rankings
- USCHO: 4
- USA Today: 1

Record
- Overall: 31–6–4
- Conference: 17–5–2
- Home: 14–1–1
- Road: 10–4–2
- Neutral: 7–1–1

Coaches and captains
- Head coach: Shawn Walsh
- Assistant coaches: Grant Standbrook; Nate Leaman; Bernie Sanford; Gene Reilly
- Captain: Steve Kariya

The 1998–99 Maine Black Bears Men's ice hockey season was the 22nd season of play for the program, the 20th at the Division I level, and the 15th in the Hockey East conference. The Black Bears represented the University of Maine and played their home games at Alfond Arena. They were coached by Shawn Walsh, in his 15th season as head coach. The Black Bears won their second national title with a victory over rival New Hampshire in the national championship game.

== Departures ==
Player	Position	Nationality	Cause
Brian Addesa	Forward	United States	Transferred to Massachusetts–Boston
Aaron Boone	Forward	United States	Left program (retired)
John DiBattista	Forward	Canada	Left program
Javier Gorriti	Goaltender	Spain	Left program (retired)
Bryan Masotta	Goaltender	United States	Left program (signed with San Diego Gulls)
Scott Parmentier	Forward	United States	Graduation (signed with Arkansas GlacierCats)
Nate Ponitz	Defenseman	United States	Left program (retired)
Jason Price	Defenseman	United States	Left program (signed with Tucson Gila Monsters)
Shawn Wansborough	Forward	Canada	Graduation (Signed with Cincinnati Mighty Ducks)
Ed Washuk	Goaltender	United States	Transferred to Iona
Brian White	Defenseman	United States	Graduation (Signed with Colorado Avalanche)

== Recruiting ==
Player	Position	Nationality	Age	Notes
Niko Dimitrakos	Forward	United States	19	Boston, MA
Barrett Heisten	Forward	United States	18	Anchorage, AK
Doug Janik	Defenseman	United States	18	Agawam, MA
Peter Metcalf	Defenseman	United States	19	Pembroke, MA
Mike Morrison	Goaltender	Canada	19	Medford, MA; selected 186th overall in 1998
Brendan Walsh	Forward	United States	23	Dorchester, MA; transfer from Boston University
Ed Wood	Defenseman	Canada	22	Rivers, MB
Matthew Yeats	Goaltender	Canada	18	Montreal, QC; selected 248th overall in 1998

== Roster ==
No.	Nat.	Player	Class	Pos	Height	Weight	DoB	Hometown	Previous team	NHL rights
1		Matthew Yeats	Freshman	G	6' 0" (1.83 m)	190 lb (86 kg)	1979-04-06	Montreal, Quebec	Olds Grizzlys (AJHL)	LAK, 248th overall 1998
2		Eric Turgeon	Sophomore	D	6' 3" (1.91 m)	203 lb (92 kg)	1977-12-05	Augusta, Maine		—
3		Doug Janik	Freshman	D	6' 2" (1.88 m)	212 lb (96 kg)	1980-03-26	Agawam, Massachusetts	USNTDP (USDP)	—
4		Peter Metcalf	Freshman	D	6' 0" (1.83 m)	201 lb (91 kg)	1979-02-25	Pembroke, Massachusetts	Cushing Academy (USHS-Prep)	—
5		Robert Ek	Junior	D	6' 5" (1.96 m)	210 lb (95 kg)	1975-10-31	Luleå, Sweden	Kimberley Dynamiters (RMJHL)	—
7		Adam Tate	Junior	D	5' 10" (1.78 m)	172 lb (78 kg)	1975-03-05	Kanata, Ontario	Cole Harbour Colts (MJHL)	—
10		Tuomo Jääskeläinen	Sophomore	F	5' 10" (1.78 m)	183 lb (83 kg)	1976-10-21	Helsinki, Finland	Jokerit (SM–Liiga)	—
11		Jason Vitorino	Senior	F	6' 3" (1.91 m)	216 lb (98 kg)		Brookline, Massachusetts		—
12		Ben Guité	Junior	F	6' 1" (1.85 m)	212 lb (96 kg)	1978-07-17	Verdun, Quebec	Capital District Selects (EJHL)	MTL, 172nd overall 1997
13		Marcus Gustafsson	Senior	F	6' 0" (1.83 m)	187 lb (85 kg)	1974-07-24	Knivsta, Sweden	Uppsala AIS (Division 1)	—
15		Niko Dimitrakos	Freshman	F	5' 10" (1.78 m)	192 lb (87 kg)	1979-05-21	Boston, Massachusetts	Avon Old Farms (USHS-Prep)	—
16		Dan Kerluke	Sophomore	F	5' 11" (1.8 m)	192 lb (87 kg)	1976-12-22	Brampton, Ontario	Brampton Capitals (OPJHL)	—
17		Bobby Stewart	Senior	F	5' 9" (1.75 m)	174 lb (79 kg)	1974-06-03	Fort McMurray, Alberta	Fort McMurray Oil Barons (AJHL)	—
18		Steve Kariya (C)	Senior	F	5' 6" (1.68 m)	159 lb (72 kg)	1977-12-22	North Vancouver, British Columbia	Nanaimo Clippers (BCJHL)	—
21		Matthias Trattnig	Sophomore	F	6' 1" (1.85 m)	212 lb (96 kg)	1979-04-22	Graz, Austria	Capital District Selects (EJHL)	CHI, 94th overall 1998
24		Jim Leger	Junior	F	5' 10" (1.78 m)	196 lb (89 kg)	1976-05-06	Saugus, Massachusetts	Dubuque Fighting Saints (USHL)	—
25		David Cullen	Senior	D	6' 1" (1.85 m)	207 lb (94 kg)	1976-12-30	St. Catharines, Ontario	Thorold Blackhawks (GHJHL)	—
26		A. J. Begg	Sophomore	F	6' 3" (1.91 m)	205 lb (93 kg)	1976-11-30	Vancouver, British Columbia	South Surrey Eagles (BCHL)	—
27		Ed Wood	Freshman	F	6' 2" (1.88 m)	190 lb (86 kg)	1976-08-24	Thompson, Manitoba	Flin Flon Bombers (SJHL)	—
29		Anders Lundbäck	Sophomore	F	6' 1" (1.85 m)	194 lb (88 kg)	1975-10-26	Luleå, Sweden	Tierps HK (Division 2)	—
30		Mike Morrison	Freshman	G	6' 2" (1.88 m)	203 lb (92 kg)	1979-07-11	Medford, Massachusetts	Phillips Exeter Academy (USHS-Prep)	EDM, 186th overall 1998
32		Magnus Lundbäck	Sophomore	F	6' 1" (1.85 m)	198 lb (90 kg)	1975-10-26	Luleå, Sweden	Tierps HK (Division 2)	—
33		Alfie Michaud	Junior	G	5' 11" (1.8 m)	174 lb (79 kg)	1976-11-06	Selkirk, Manitoba	Lebret Eagles (SJHL)	—
36		Brendan Walsh	Junior	F	5' 10" (1.78 m)	201 lb (91 kg)	1974-10-22	Dorchester, Massachusetts	Boston University (HEA)	—
37		Barrett Heisten	Freshman	F	6' 1" (1.85 m)	192 lb (87 kg)	1980-03-19	Anchorage, Alaska	USNTDP (USDP)	—
39		Cory Larose	Junior	F	5' 11" (1.8 m)	190 lb (86 kg)	1975-05-14	Campbellton, New Brunswick	Langley Thunder (BCJHL)	—

== Standings ==
1998–99 Hockey East standings
	Conference							Overall					
	GP	W	L	T	PTS	GF	GA	GP	W	L	T	GF	GA
#2 New Hampshire†	24	18	3	3	39	100	49	41	31	7	3	171	91
#1 Maine	24	17	5	2	36	96	64	41	31	6	4	167	94
#4 Boston College*	24	15	7	2	32	99	73	43	27	12	4	170	125
Providence	24	12	11	1	25	90	81	38	20	17	1	159	134
Boston University	24	8	13	3	19	72	86	37	14	20	3	117	132
Massachusetts–Lowell	24	9	15	0	18	65	85	36	17	19	0	112	117
Massachusetts	24	8	14	2	18	56	86	35	12	21	2	80	114
Merrimack	24	7	16	1	15	67	94	36	11	24	1	107	136
Northeastern	24	6	16	2	14	74	101	34	11	20	3	108	132
Championship: Boston College † indicates conference regular season champion * indicates conference tournament champion Final rankings: USA Today/American Hockey Magazine Coaches Poll Top 10 Poll

== Schedule and results ==
Date	Opponent^{#}	Rank^{#}	Site	TV	Result	Record
Regular season
October 16	at Nebraska-Omaha*	#8	Omaha Civic Auditorium • Omaha, Nebraska		W 7–2	1–0–0
October 17	at Nebraska-Omaha*	#8	Omaha Civic Auditorium • Omaha, Nebraska		W 3–0	2–0–0
JCPenney Classic
October 23	Moncton*	#3	Alfond Arena • Orono, Maine (J. C. Penney semifinal, exhibition)		W 5–0	
October 24	Union*	#3	Alfond Arena • Orono, Maine (J. C. Penney Championship)		W 6–1	3–0–0
November 6	Mass-Lowell	#4	Alfond Arena • Orono, Maine		W 3–2 ^{OT}	4–0–0 (1–0–0)
November 7	Mass-Lowell	#4	Alfond Arena • Orono, Maine		W 5–2	5–0–0 (2–0–0)
November 13	at Massachusetts	#4	Mullins Center • Amherst, Massachusetts		L 1–2	5–1–0 (2–1–0)
November 14	at Massachusetts	#4	Mullins Center • Amherst, Massachusetts		T 1–1	5–1–1 (2–1–1)
November 20	Providence	#7	Alfond Arena • Orono, Maine		W 6–1	6–1–1 (3–1–1)
November 21	Providence	#7	Alfond Arena • Orono, Maine		W 3–2	7–1–1 (4–1–1)
Governor's Cup
November 27	vs. #7 New Hampshire*	#6	Tsongas Arena • Lowell, Massachusetts (Governor's Cup semifinal)		W 4–3	8–1–1
November 28	vs. Vermont*	#6	Tsongas Arena • Lowell, MA (Governor's Cup Championship)		W 2–0	9–1–1
December 12	Northeastern	#3	Alfond Arena • Orono, Maine		W 5–1	10–1–1 (5–1–1)
December 13	Northeastern	#3	Alfond Arena • Orono, Maine		T 7–7	10–1–2 (5–1–2)
December 18	Dartmouth*	#4	Alfond Arena • Orono, Maine		W 7–1	11–1–2
December 21	vs. Colgate*	#4	Hartford Civic Center • Hartford, Connecticut (ECAC-Hockey East Holiday Doubleheader)		T 3–3	11–1–3
January 1	at Denver*	#4	Magness Arena • Denver, Colorado		W 4–3	12–1–3
January 3	at #2 Colorado College*	#4	Broadmoor World Arena • Colorado Springs, Colorado		T 3–3	12–1–4
January 5	at Boston University	#2	Walter Brown Arena • Boston, Massachusetts		W 4–3	13–1–4 (6–1–2)
January 8	at #6 Boston College	#2	Conte Forum • Chestnut Hill, Massachusetts		W 2–1	14–1–4 (7–1–2)
January 9	at #6 Boston College	#2	Conte Forum • Chestnut Hill, Massachusetts		L 4–7	14–2–4 (7–2–2)
January 13	Yale*	#3	Alfond Arena • Orono, Maine		W 6–1	15–2–4
January 17	Massachusetts	#3	Alfond Arena • Orono, Maine		W 5–0	16–2–4 (8–2–2)
January 22	at Merrimack	#2	J. Thom Lawler Rink • North Andover, Massachusetts		W 5–2	17–2–4 (9–2–2)
January 23	at Merrimack	#2	Lawler Rink • North Andover, Massachusetts		W 4–3	18–2–4 (10–2–2)
January 29	at Providence	#2	Schneider Arena • Providence, Rhode Island		W 7–4	19–2–4 (11–2–2)
February 5	at Northeastern	#2	Matthews Arena • Boston, Massachusetts		W 5–1	20–2–4 (12–2–2)
February 7	#3 New Hampshire	#2	Alfond Arena • Orono, Maine		W 4–3	21–2–4 (13–2–2)
February 13	#6 Boston College	#2	Alfond Arena • Orono, Maine		W 6–4	22–2–4 (14–2–2)
February 19	Boston University	#2	Alfond Arena • Orono, Maine		W 7-2	23–2–4 (15–2–2)
February 20	Boston University	#2	Alfond Arena • Orono, Maine		L 1–4	23–3–4 (15–3–2)
February 26	at Mass-Lowell	#3	Tsongas Arena • Lowell, Massachusetts		W 5–2	24–3–4 (16–3–2)
February 28	Merrimack	#3	Alfond Arena • Orono, Maine		W 4–0	25–3–4 (17–3–2)
March 5	at #4 New Hampshire	#3	Whittemore Center • Durham, New Hampshire		L 1–6	25–4–4 (17–4–2)
March 6	at #4 New Hampshire	#3	Whittemore Center • Durham, New Hampshire		L 1–4	25–5–4 (17–5–2)
Hockey East Tournament
March 11	Massachusetts	#4	Alfond Arena • Orono, Maine		W 3–1	26–5–4
March 12	Massachusetts	#4	Alfond Arena • Orono, Maine		W 5–2	27–5–4
March 19	vs. #7 Boston College	#4	FleetCenter • Boston, Massachusetts		L 2–3	27–6–4
NCAA National Tournament
March 26	vs. Ohio State*	#4	Worcester Centrum • Worcester, Massachusetts (NCAA regional quarterfinals)		W 4–2	28–6–4
March 27	vs. #6 Clarkson*	#4	Worcester Centrum • Worcester, Massachusetts (NCAA regional semifinals)		W 7–2	29–6–4
April 1	vs. #5 Boston College*	#4	Arrowhead Pond • Anaheim, California (Frozen Four)		W 2–1 ^{OT}	30–6–4
April 3	vs. #2 New Hampshire*	#4	Arrowhead Pond • Anaheim, California (National Championship Game)		W 3–2 ^{OT}	31–6–4
*Non-conference game. ^{#}Rankings from USCHO.com Poll. All times are in Eastern Time.

== 1999 National Championship game ==
April 3	New Hampshire	2 – 3	OT	Maine	Arrowhead Pond of Anaheim

Scoring summary
Period	Team	Goal	Assist(s)	Time	Score
1st	Maine	Ben Guité (12) – PP	Vitorino and Kerluke	15:47	1–0 Maine
2nd	Maine	Niko Dimitrakos (8)	Cullen and Metcalf	33:47	2–0 Maine
2nd	UNH	Darren Haydar (31) – SH	Souza and Conklin	35:58	2–1 Maine
3rd	UNH	Michael Souza (23)	Krog and Haydar	43:33	2–2
1st Overtime	Maine	Marcus Gustafsson (13) – GW	Larose	70:50	3–2 Maine

Goaltenders
Team	Name	Saves	Goals against	Time on ice
Maine	Alfie Michaud	46	2	
UNH	Ty Conklin	36	3	

== Scoring statistics ==
Name	Position	Games	Goals	Assists	Points	PIM
Steve Kayria	LW	41	27	38	65	24
Cory Larose	C	38	21	31	52	34
David Cullen	D	41	11	33	44	24
Dan Kerluke	LW	41	23	19	42	18
Marcus Gustafsson	LW	41	13	15	28	16
Barrett Heisten	LW	34	12	16	28	72
Ben Guité	C	40	12	16	28	30
Niko Dimitrakos	RW	35	8	19	27	33
Peter Metcalf	D	33	6	17	23	34
Brendan Walsh	C	30	7	13	20	58
Doug Janik	D	35	3	13	16	44
Bobby Stewart	LW	31	8	5	13	28
Anders Lundbäck	C	41	1	11	12	20
Matthais Trattnig	D/RW	39	5	5	10	32
Ed Wood	D	21	1	9	10	10
Jim Leger	F	41	5	2	7	4
Tuomo Jääskeläinen	F	25	1	5	6	14
Robert Ek	D	39	0	6	6	44
Jason Vitorino	F	35	2	1	3	34
Magnus Lundbäck	LW	13	1	2	3	2
Eric Turgeon	D	12	0	2	2	4
A. J. Begg	C	26	0	2	2	26
Alfie Michaud	G	37	0	1	1	0
Adam Tate	D	5	0	0	0	4
Mike Morrison	G	11	0	0	0	0
Bench	-	41	-	-	-	0
Total			167	281	448	609

== Goaltending statistics ==
Name	Games	Minutes	Wins	Losses	Ties	Goals against	Saves	Shut outs	SV %	GAA
Mike Morrison	11	347	3	0	1	10		1	.917	1.73
Alfie Michaud	37	2147	28	6	3	83		3	.910	2.32
Empty Net	-	-	-	-	-	1	-	-	-	-
Total	41		31	6	4	94		4		

== Rankings ==
Poll	Week																							
Poll	Pre	1	2	3	4	5	6	7	8	9	10	11	12	13	14	15	16	17	18	19	20	21	22	23 (Final)
USCHO.com	8	3	3	4	4	7	6	3	3	4	-	2	3	2	2	2	2	2	3	3	4	-	4	N/A
USA Today	-	-	-	4	4	6	5	3	3	4	2	-	2	2	2	2	2	2	3	-	-	4	4	1

USCHO did not release a poll in week 23.

== Awards and honors ==
Player	Award	Ref
Alfie Michaud	NCAA Tournament Most Outstanding Player	
David Cullen	AHCA East First Team All-American	
Steve Kariya	AHCA East First Team All-American	
Alfie Michaud	NCAA All-Tournament Team	
David Cullen	NCAA All-Tournament Team	
Niko Dimitrakos	NCAA All-Tournament Team	
Steve Kariya	Len Ceglarski Award	
David Cullen	All-Hockey East First Team	
Steve Kariya	All-Hockey East First Team	
Peter Metcalf	Hockey East All-Rookie Team	
Barrett Heisten	Hockey East All-Rookie Team	

== Players drafted into the NHL ==
=== 1999 NHL entry draft ===
= NHL All-Star team	= NHL All-Star	= NHL All-Star and NHL All-Star team	= Did not play in the NHL

Round	Pick	Player	NHL team
1	20	Barrett Heisten	Buffalo Sabres
2	55	Doug Janik	Buffalo Sabres
5	155	Niko Dimitrakos	San Jose Sharks
9	267	Peter Metcalf	Toronto Maple Leafs
