= 1999 MAAC men's ice hockey tournament =

1999 MAAC Men's ice hockey tournament
- Dates: March 13–20, 1999
- Teams: 8
- Finals site: Hart Center; Worcester, Massachusetts
- Champions: Holy Cross (1st title)
- Winning coach: Paul Pearl (1st title)
- MVP: Mike Maguire (Holy Cross)
- MAAC Men's Ice Hockey Tournaments

The 1999 Metro Atlantic Athletic Conference Men's Ice Hockey Tournament was the 1st championship since the founding of the ice hockey conference in 1997. It was played between March 13 and March 20, 1999. Quarterfinal games were played at home team campus sites, while the final four games were played at the Hart Center in Worcester, Massachusetts, the home venue of the Holy Cross Crusaders.

== Format ==
The tournament featured three rounds of play with each round being single-elimination. In the first round, the first and eighth seeds, the second and seventh seeds, the third seed and sixth seeds, and the fourth seed and fifth seeds played with the winner advancing to the semifinals. In the semifinals, the highest and lowest seeds and second highest and second lowest seeds play with the winner advancing to the championship game. The tournament champion does not receive an automatic bid to the 1999 NCAA Men's Division I Ice Hockey Tournament.

== Conference standings ==
Note: GP = Games played; W = Wins; L = Losses; T = Ties; PTS = Points; GF = Goals For; GA = Goals Against

1998–99 Metro Atlantic Athletic Conference standings
	Conference							Overall					
	GP	W	L	T	PTS	GF	GA	GP	W	L	T	GF	GA
Quinnipiac†	28	22	4	2	46	131	63	34	26	6	2	161	81
Holy Cross*	28	19	6	3	41	107	63	35	22	9	4	126	89
Connecticut	28	18	6	4	40	106	70	34	20	10	4	122	95
Canisius	28	12	11	5	29	112	82	36	16	15	5	143	119
American International	28	11	13	4	26	92	93	32	12	16	4	101	113
Iona	28	12	15	1	25	116	115	33	13	18	2	145	143
Sacred Heart	28	7	20	1	15	81	128	31	7	23	1	86	139
Fairfield	28	1	27	0	2	55	186	32	1	31	0	64	227
Championship: Holy Cross † indicates conference regular season champion * indicates conference tournament champion Final rankings: USA Today/American Hockey Magazine Coaches Poll Top 10 Poll

== Bracket ==
Teams are reseeded after the quarterfinals

Quarterfinals; March 13
1	Quinnipiac	13
8	Fairfield	2
4	Canisius	7
5	American International	4
2	Holy Cross	3
7	Sacred Heart	1
3	Connecticut	6
6	Iona	5

Semifinals; March 19
1	Quinnipiac	2
4	Canisius	5
2	Holy Cross	4*
3	Connecticut	3

Championship; March 20
4	Canisius	3
2	Holy Cross	4

Note: * denotes overtime period(s)

=== Quarterfinals ===
==== (1) Quinnipiac vs. (8) Fairfield ====
March 13	Quinnipiac	13 – 2	Fairfield	East Haven Rink
No Scoring		First period	04:03 - Tim Desmarais
Joe Guerriero - 03:09; Todd Bennett - 03:37; Terry Harris - GW PP - 05:42; Ryan Olson - 06:43; Todd Bennett - 07:10; Terry Harris - SH - 10:11; Chris Cerrella - PP - 12:13; Todd Bennett - PP - 12:36; Chris Cerrella - 17:24		Second period	10:31 - PP - Michael Shaheen
Jason Rothfuss - 05:41; Anthony DiPalma - 08:41; John Delorenzo - PP - 15:43; Joe Guerriero - 16:49		Third period	No scoring
Dan DiLeo ( 5 saves / 7 shots ) / J.C. Wells ( 1 saves / 1 shots ) / Jim White ( 1 saves / 1 shots )		Goalie stats	John True ( 44 saves / 56 shots ) / Charles Fitzpatrick ( 7 saves / 8 shots )

==== (2) Holy Cross vs. (7) Sacred Heart ====
March 13	Holy Cross	3 – 1	Sacred Heart	Hart Center
Chris Fattey - PP - 18:53		First period	No scoring
Paul Cavanaugh - GW PP - 00:20		Second period	05:12 - SH - Eddy Bourget
Mike Ortwein - 04:44		Third period	No scoring
Scott Simpson ( 20 saves / 21 shots )		Goalie stats	Alexis Jutras-Binet ( 40 saves / 43 shots )

==== (3) Connecticut vs. (6) Iona ====
March 13	Connecticut	6 – 5	OT	Iona	UConn Ice Arena
Chris McNeill - 02:08		First period		No scoring
Ciro Longobardi - 10:24; Matthew Jarret - 16:18; Rob Martin - 18:00		Second period		12:17 - Rob Kellogg
Chris McNeill - 09:53		Third period		07:24 - PP - Rob Kellogg; 11:54 - Ryan Carter; 15:22 - Erik Nates; 18:38 - Chris Baboulis
Kevin Connell - GW - 01:24		First overtime period		No scoring
Marc Senerchia ( 18 saves / 23 shots )		Goalie stats		Dan McGuire ( 21 saves / 27 shots )

==== (4) Canisius vs. (5) American International ====
March 13	Canisius	7 – 5	American International	Dann Memorial Rink

=== Semifinals ===
==== (1) Quinnipiac vs. (4) Canisius ====
March 19	Quinnipiac	2 – 5	Canisius	Hart Center
No Scoring		First period	No scoring
Anthony DiPalma - 19:54		Second period	00:38 - Derek Gilham; 00:38 - Chris Duggan; 00:38 - GW SH - Brad Kenny
Dan Ennis - PP - 11:29		Third period	04:54 - PP - Jarret Zielinski; 11:54 - Chris Duggan
J.C. Wells ( 21 saves / 26 shots )		Goalie stats	Bob Janosz ( 22 saves / 24 shots )

==== (2) Holy Cross vs. (3) Connecticut ====
March 19	Holy Cross	4 – 3	OT	Connecticut	Hart Center
Joe Roache - 02:48; Tim Cantwell - 08:00		First period		18:34 - SH - Michael Goldkind
No scoring		Second period		12:55 - Dan Sheehan
Jeremy Tevald - 16:25		Third period		15:47 - Kevin Connell
Brett Cagliuso - GW - 04:37		First overtime period		No scoring
Scott Simpson ( 36 saves / 39 shots )		Goalie stats		Marc Senerchia ( 40 saves / 44 shots )

=== Championship ===
==== (2) Holy Cross vs. (4) Canisius ====
March 20	Holy Cross	4 – 3	Canisius	Hart Center
Patrick Rissmiller - 08:46		First period	No scoring
Mike Maguire - PP - 15:08; Mike Ortwein - 19:27		Second period	04:45 - PP - Ryan Puntiri; 05:35 - David Deeves; 15:22 - Robert Othmann
Mike Maguire - GW - 01:06		Third period	No scoring
Scott Simpson ( 28 saves / 31 shots )		Goalie stats	Bob Janosz ( 35 saves / 39 shots )

== Tournament awards ==
=== MVP ===
- Mike Maguire (Holy Cross)

== Notes ==
- Quinnipiac's 13 goals are a tournament record
