= 1999 NCAA Division I men's ice hockey tournament =

- 1999 Frozen Four logo
- Teams: 12
- Finals site: Arrowhead Pond of Anaheim, Anaheim, California
- Champions: Maine Black Bears (2nd title)
- Runner-up: New Hampshire Wildcats (1st title game)
- Semifinalists: Boston College Eagles (15th Frozen Four); Michigan State Spartans (9th Frozen Four)
- Winning coach: Shawn Walsh (2nd title)
- MOP: Alfie Michaud (Maine)
- Attendance: 69,429

The 1999 NCAA Division I men's ice hockey tournament involved 12 schools in playing in single-elimination play to determine the national champion of NCAA Division I. It began on March 26, 1999. The second round was on March 27 and March 28. The semifinals were on April 1. The National Championship Game was on April 3, 1999. A total of 11 games were played, the final 3 at the Arrowhead Pond (now the Honda Center) in Anaheim, CA. The University of Maine defeated New Hampshire by a score of 3–2 in overtime, to claim their second national championship.

== Qualifying teams ==
The at-large bids and seeding for each team in the tournament were announced after the conference tournaments concluded on March 20, 1999. The Central Collegiate Hockey Association (CCHA) had four teams receive a berth in the tournament, Hockey East and Western Collegiate Hockey Association (WCHA) each had three teams receive a berth in the tournament, while the ECAC had two berths.

West Regional – Madison							East Regional – Worcester						
Seed	School	Conference	Record	Berth type	Appearance	Last bid	Seed	School	Conference	Record	Berth type	Appearance	Last bid
1	North Dakota (1)	WCHA	32–5–2	At-large bid	15th	1998	1	New Hampshire (2)	Hockey East	29–6–3	At-large bid	10th	1998
2	Michigan State	CCHA	28–5–7	At-large bid	19th	1998	2	Clarkson	ECAC	25–10–1	Tournament champion	18th	1998
3	Colorado College	WCHA	28–11–1	At-large bid	13th	1998	3	Maine	Hockey East	27–6–4	At-large bid	9th	1995
4	Boston College	Hockey East	25–11–4	Tournament champion	20th	1998	4	Denver	WCHA	26–12–2	Tournament champion	15th	1997
5	Northern Michigan	CCHA	22–14–5	At-large bid	7th	1993	5	Michigan	CCHA	24–10–6	Tournament champion	22nd	1998
6	St. Lawrence	ECAC	23–12–3	At-large bid	13th	1992	6	Ohio State	CCHA	21–15–4	At-large bid	2nd	1998

Number in parentheses denotes overall seed in the tournament.

== Game locations ==
- East Regional – Centrum Centre, Worcester, Massachusetts
- West Regional – Dane County Coliseum, Madison, Wisconsin
- Frozen Four – Arrowhead Pond of Anaheim, Anaheim, California

== Bracket ==
First Round; March 26–27
E4	Denver	3
E5	Michigan	5
W3	Colorado College	5
W6	St. Lawrence	4
E3	Maine	4
E6	Ohio State	2
W4	Boston College	2
W5	Northern Michigan	1

Quarterfinals; March 27–28
E1	New Hampshire	2*
E5	Michigan	1
W2	Michigan State	4
W3	Colorado College	3
E2	Clarkson	2
E3	Maine	7
W1	North Dakota	1
W4	Boston College	3

National Semifinals; April 1
E1	New Hampshire	5
W2	Michigan State	3
E3	Maine	2*
W4	Boston College	1

National Championship; April 3
E1	New Hampshire	2
E3	Maine	3*

Note: * denotes overtime period(s)

== Results ==
=== East Regional – Worcester, Massachusetts ===
==== First Round ====
March 26, 1999; 5:00 pm	(3) Maine	4–2 (2–1, 0–0, 2–1)	(6) Ohio State	Centrum Centre; Attendance: 8,509

Game reference

Alfie Michaud
Goalies
Jeff Maund
Referee:
Mike Schmitt
Linesmen:
Jon Campion
Derek Shepard

(Walsh) Bobby Stewart – 06:58	1 – 0
(Dimitrakos, Guite) Dan Kerluke – 12:07	2 – 0
	2 – 1	18:50 – Jason Crain (Des Gagné, Richards)
(Kariya, LaRose) Marcus Gustafsson – GW – 48:53	3 – 1
(Ek, LaRose) Steve Kariya – SH – 53:23	4 – 1
	4 – 2	55:21 – Brandon Lafrance (Meloche)

8 min
Penalties
6 min
34
Shots
22

March 26, 1999; 8:30 pm	(4) Denver	3–5 (1–0, 2–2, 0–3)	(5) Michigan	Centrum Centre; Attendance: 8,509

Game reference

Stephen Wagner
Goalies
Josh Blackburn
Referee:
Jeff Bunyon
Linesmen:
Paul Scalparts
Richard Zanetti

(Ritson, Patterson) Björn Engström – 13:11	1 – 0
(Patterson) Joe Ritson – 26:34	2 – 0
(Kidd) Paul Veres – 27:44	3 – 0
	3 – 1	32:09 – Greg Crozier (Kosick, Matzka)
	3 – 2	36:11 – Sean Ritchlin (Kosick)
	3 – 3	46:11 – Dave Huntzicker (Koch, Matzka)
	3 – 4	50:58 – GW – Dale Rominski (Jillson)
	3 – 5	53:40 – Mike Comrie (unassisted)

14 min
Penalties
14 min
18
Shots
24

==== Quarterfinals ====
March 27, 1999; 6:30 pm	(1) New Hampshire	2–1 (OT) (1–0, 0–0, 0–1, 1–0)	(5) Michigan	Centrum Centre; Attendance: 12,517

Game reference

Ty Conklin
Goalies
Josh Blackburn
Referee:
Mike Schmitt
Linesmen:
Derek Shepard
Jon Campion

(Krog, Haydar) Mike Souza – 19:50	1 – 0
	1 – 1	50:00 – Bobby Hayes (unassisted)
(Krog) Darren Haydar – GW – 63:16	2 – 1

2 min
Penalties
2 min
34
Shots
21

March 27, 1999; 3:00 pm	(2) Clarkson	2–7 (1–3, 1–1, 0–3)	(3) Maine	Centrum Centre; Attendance: 12,517

Game reference

Shawn Grant
Goalies
Alfie Michaud (out 58:02)
Mike Morrison (in 58:02)
Referee:
Steve Piotrowski
Linesmen:
John Pearson
John LaDuque

	0 – 1	09:32 – Marcus Gustafsson (Kariya, Cullen)
(Cole, Ollila) David Evans – 11:05	1 – 1
	1 – 2	16:23 – PP – Steve Kariya (Cullen, Larose)
	1 – 3	18:14 – GW – David Cullen (unassisted)
	1 – 4	24:55 – PP – Steve Kariya (Kerluke, Larose)
(unassisted) David Evans – PS – 36:52	2 – 4
	2 – 5	40:37 – Cory Larose (Metcalf, Kariya)
	2 – 6	52:21 – PP – Niko Dimitrakos (Metcalf, Kariya)
	2 – 7	55:25 – EN – Steve Kariya (unassisted)

14 min
Penalties
16 min
22
Shots
24

=== West Regional – Madison, Wisconsin ===
==== First Round ====
March 27, 1999; 1:00 pm	(3) Colorado College	5–2 (0–1, 4–1, 1–0)	(6) St. Lawrence	Dane County Coliseum; Attendance: 2,414

Game reference

Jeff Sanger
Goalies
Eric Heffler

	0 – 1	10:48 – SH – Brandon Dietrich (unassisted)
(Stuart) Cam Kryway – 21:21	1 – 1
(Cullen, Peters) Justin Morrison – 21:32	2 – 1
(unassisted) Aaron Karpan – GW – 22:03	3 – 1
	3 – 2	29:26 – PP – Al Fyfe (Daniels, Desrosiers)
(S. Swanson) Shaun Winkler – 36:34	4 – 2
(S. Swanson, Kryway) Justin Morrison – EN – 59:40	5 – 2

10 min
Penalties
8 min
31
Shots
33

March 27, 1999; 4:30 pm	(4) Boston College	2–1 (0–1, 2–0, 0–0)	(5) Northern Michigan	Dane County Coliseum; Attendance: 2,414

Game reference

Scott Clemmensen
Goalies
Dan Ragusett

	0 – 1	05:38 – Fred Mattersdorfer (Theuer, Phillips)
(Bellefeuille, Gionta) Jeff Farkas – PP – 25:01	1 – 1
(Bellefeuille, Mattau) Brian Gionta – PP GW – 38:23	2 – 1

14 min
Penalties
14 min
24
Shots
27

==== Quarterfinals ====
March 28, 1999; 5:30 pm	(1) North Dakota	1–2 (0–0, 1–2, 0–1)	(4) Boston College	Dane County Coliseum; Attendance: 2,910

Game reference

Karl Goehring
Goalies
Scott Clemmensen

	0 – 1	30:26 – PP – Chris Masters (Lephart)
(Williamson) Lee Goren – PP – 33:47	1 – 1
	1 – 2	37:45 – GW – Jeff Giuliano (Farkas, Orpik)
	1 – 3	59:49 – EN – Brian Gionta (Bellefeuille)

31 min
Penalties
8 min
32
Shots
29

March 28, 1999; 2:00 pm	(2) Michigan State	4–3 (1–1, 0–1, 3–1)	(3) Colorado College	Dane County Coliseum; Attendance: 2,910

Game reference

Joe Blackburn
Goalies
Jeff Sanger
Referee:
Tim Benedetto
Linesmen:
John Jones
Tom Carpenito

(Dolyn, Horcoff) Joe Goodenow – 01:56	1 – 0
	1 – 1	14:43 – PP – K.J. Voorhees (Heerema, Austin)
	1 – 2	25:41 – Cam Kryway (Heerema, B. Swanson)
(Adams, Kozakowski) Adam Hall – 49:14	2 – 2
	2 – 3	51:21 – Trent Clark (Manning, Hartsburg)
(Adams, Bogas) Andrew Hutchinson – PP – 58:20	3 – 3
(York, Adams) Adam Hall – GW – 58:52	4 – 3

14 min
Penalties
18 min
41
Shots
28

=== Frozen Four – Anaheim, California ===
==== National Semifinals ====
April 1, 1999; 1:00 pm	(E3) Maine	2–1 (OT) (0–0, 0–1, 1–0, 1–0)	(W4) Boston College	Arrowhead Pond of Anaheim; Attendance: 12,852

Game reference

Alfie Michaud
Goalies
Scott Clemmensen

	0 – 1	25:34 – PP – Marty Hughes (Lephart, Masters)
(Guité, Kerluke) Niko Dimitrakos – 42:34	1 – 1
(Heisten, Dimitrakos) Bobby Stewart – GW – 65:16	2 – 1

12 min
Penalties
14 min
37
Shots
36

April 1, 1999; 6:00 pm	(E1) New Hampshire	5–3 (1–1, 2–1, 2–1)	(W2) Michigan State	Arrowhead Pond of Anaheim; Attendance: 12,719

Game reference

Ty Conklin
Goalies
Joe Blackburn
Referee:
Mike Noeth
Linesmen:
Bill Jones
Tim Kotyra

(Ficek, Filipowicz) Jason Krog – 18:49	1 – 0
	1 – 1	19:27 – Rustyn Dolyny (Horcoff, Hodgins)
(Haydar, Walsh) Mike Souza – 22:44	2 – 1
	2 – 2	26:49 – Sean Patchell (Loeding, York)
(unassisted) Mike Souza – 38:17	3 – 2
	3 – 3	43:44 – Adam Hall (York)
(Krog, Souza) Jason Shipulski – GW – 50:52	4 – 3
(Haydar, Souza) Jason Krog – PP – 54:40	5 – 3

14 min
Penalties
10 min
37
Shots
35

==== National Championship ====
April 3, 1999; 4:30 pm	(E1) New Hampshire	2–3 (OT) (0–1, 1–1, 1–0, 0–1)	(E3) Maine	Arrowhead Pond of Anaheim; Attendance: 14,447

Game reference
Referee: Mike Noeth; Linesmen: Bill Jones; Tim Kotyra

Scoring summary
Period	Team	Goal	Assist(s)	Time	Score
1st	Maine	Ben Guité (12) – PP	Vitorino and Kerluke	15:47	1–0 Maine
2nd	Maine	Niko Dimitrakos (8)	Cullen and Metcalf	33:47	2–0 Maine
2nd	UNH	Darren Haydar (31) – SH	Souza and Conklin	35:58	2–1 Maine
3rd	UNH	Michael Souza (23)	Krog and Haydar	43:33	2–2
1st Overtime	Maine	Marcus Gustafsson (13) – GW	Larose	70:50	3–2 Maine
Penalty summary
Period	Team	Player	Penalty	Time	PIM
1st	UNH	Darren Haydar	Roughing	0:40	2:00
1st	Maine	Barrett Heisten	Tripping	2:42	2:00
1st	Maine	Robert Ek	Roughing	9:39	2:00
1st	UNH	Christian Bragnalo	Boarding	10:34	2:00
1st	UNH	Mike Souza	Cross-checking	11:13	2:00
1st	Maine	Jason Vitorino	Interference	13:30	2:00
1st	UNH	John Sadowski	Hooking	14:53	2:00
1st	Maine	Matthias Trattnig	High-sticking	19:49	2:00
2nd	Maine	Bench	Too many men (served by Jason Vitorino)	20:47	2:00
2nd	Maine	Dan Kerluke	Checking from behind	31:10	2:00
2nd	UNH	Darren Haydar	Elbowing	33:52	2:00
2nd	UNH	Chad Onufrechuk	Slashing	34:28	2:00
2nd	UNH	Christian Bragnalo	Misconduct	34:33	10:00
2nd	Maine	Bench	Delay of game (served by Dan Kerluke)	35:58	2:00
2nd	UNH	Darren Haydar	Tripping	39:24	2:00
3rd	none				
1st Overtime	Maine	Doug Janik	Roughing	67:22	2:00
1st Overtime	UNH	John Sadowski	Holding	67:22	2:00

Shots by period
Team	1	2	3	OT	T
Maine	12	11	7	9	39
New Hampshire	16	19	8	5	48

Goaltenders
Team	Name	Saves	Goals against	Time on ice
Maine	Alfie Michaud	46	2	
UNH	Ty Conklin	36	3	

== All-Tournament team ==
- G: Alfie Michaud* (Maine)
- D: David Cullen (Maine)
- D: Jayme Filipowicz (New Hampshire)
- F: Niko Dimitrakos (Maine)
- F: Jason Krog (New Hampshire)
- F: Mike Souza (New Hampshire)

* Most Outstanding Player(s)

== Record by conference ==
Conference	# of Bids	Record	Win %	Regional semifinals	Frozen Four	Championship Game	Champions
CCHA	4	2-4	.333	2	1	-	-
Hockey East	3	8-2	.800	3	3	2	1
WCHA	3	1-3	.250	2	-	-	-
ECAC	2	0-2	.000	1	-	-	-
