= 1998–99 Connecticut Huskies men's ice hockey season =

- Conference: 3rd MAAC
- Home ice: Mark Edward Freitas Ice Forum

Rankings
- USCHO: NR
- USA Today: NR

Record
- Overall: 20–10–4
- Conference: 18–6–4

Coaches and captains
- Head coach: Bruce Marshall

The 1998–99 Connecticut Huskies men's ice hockey team represented the University of Connecticut in the 1998–99 NCAA Division I men's ice hockey season. The team was coached by Bruce Marshall his eleventh season behind the bench at UConn. The Huskies played their home games at the Mark Edward Freitas Ice Forum in Storrs, Connecticut, competing in their first season in the Metro Atlantic Athletic Conference and first at the NCAA Division I level.

== Standings ==
1998–99 Metro Atlantic Athletic Conference standings
	Conference							Overall					
	GP	W	L	T	PTS	GF	GA	GP	W	L	T	GF	GA
Quinnipiac†	28	22	4	2	46	131	63	34	26	6	2	161	81
Holy Cross*	28	19	6	3	41	107	63	35	22	9	4	126	89
Connecticut	28	18	6	4	40	106	70	34	20	10	4	122	95
Canisius	28	12	11	5	29	112	82	36	16	15	5	143	119
American International	28	11	13	4	26	92	93	32	12	16	4	101	113
Iona	28	12	15	1	25	116	115	33	13	18	2	145	143
Sacred Heart	28	7	20	1	15	81	128	31	7	23	1	86	139
Fairfield	28	1	27	0	2	55	186	32	1	31	0	64	227
Championship: Holy Cross † indicates conference regular season champion * indicates conference tournament champion Final rankings: USA Today/American Hockey Magazine Coaches Poll Top 10 Poll

== Schedule ==
Date	Opponent^{#}	Rank^{#}	Site	Result	Record
Exhibition
October 17	Penn State*		Mark Edward Freitas Ice Forum • Storrs, Connecticut	L 1–6	
Regular season
October 30	at Iona		New Roc Ice Skating Center • New Rochelle, New York	W 6–3	1–0–0 (1–0–0)
October 31	at Iona		New Roc Ice Skating Center • New Rochelle, New York	W 5–3	2–0–0 (2–0–0)
November 6	at American International		Olympia Ice Center • West Springfield, Massachusetts	T 2–2 ^{OT}	2–0–1 (2–0–1)
November 7	American International		Mark Edward Freitas Ice Forum • Storrs, Connecticut	W 3–1	3–0–1 (3–0–1)
November 13	Quinnipiac		Mark Edward Freitas Ice Forum • Storrs, Connecticut	W 2–1	4–0–1 (4–0–1)
November 14	at Quinnipiac		East Haven Rink • East Haven, Connecticut	L 3–8	4–1–1 (4–1–1)
November 20	at Holy Cross		Hart Center • Worcester, Massachusetts	W 2–1	5–1–1 (5–1–1)
November 21	Holy Cross		Mark Edward Freitas Ice Forum • Storrs, Connecticut	L 2–4	5–2–1 (5–2–1)
November 24	Army		Mark Edward Freitas Ice Forum • Storrs, Connecticut	W 4–2	6–2–1 (6–2–1)
November 27	at Minnesota State*		Midwest Wireless Center • Mankato, Minnesota	L 2–8	6–3–1
November 28	at Minnesota State*		Midwest Wireless Center • Mankato, Minnesota	L 1–3	6–4–1
December 4	Fairfield		Mark Edward Freitas Ice Forum • Storrs, Connecticut	W 8–1	7–4–1 (7–2–1)
December 5	at Fairfield		Wonderland of Ice • Bridgeport, Connecticut	W 8–3	8–4–1 (8–2–1)
December 29	Iona*		Mark Edward Freitas Ice Forum • Storrs, Connecticut (SNET/UConn Classic)	W 8–3	9–4–1
December 30	Alabama–Huntsville*		Mark Edward Freitas Ice Forum • Storrs, Connecticut (SNET/UConn Classic)	L 0–3	9–5–1
January 8	Canisius		Mark Edward Freitas Ice Forum • Storrs, Connecticut	W 5–2	10–5–1 (9–2–1)
January 9	Canisius		Mark Edward Freitas Ice Forum • Storrs, Connecticut	T 1–1 ^{OT}	10–5–2 (9–2–2)
January 15	at Sacred Heart		Milford Ice Pavilion • Milford, Connecticut	T 2–2 ^{OT}	10–5–3 (9–2–3)
January 16	Sacred Heart		Mark Edward Freitas Ice Forum • Storrs, Connecticut	L 1–4	10–6–3 (9–3–3)
January 23	Iona		Mark Edward Freitas Ice Forum • Storrs, Connecticut	T 3–3	10–6–4 (9–3–4)
January 29	American International		Mark Edward Freitas Ice Forum • Storrs, Connecticut	W 5–2	11–6–4 (10–3–4)
January 30	at American International		Olympia Ice Center • West Springfield, Massachusetts	W 4–2	12–6–4 (11–3–4)
February 5	at Quinnipiac		East Haven Rink • East Haven, Connecticut	W 1–0	13–6–4 (12–3–4)
February 6	Quinnipiac		Mark Edward Freitas Ice Forum • Storrs, Connecticut	L 1–4	13–7–4 (12–4–4)
February 12	Holy Cross		Mark Edward Freitas Ice Forum • Storrs, Connecticut	L 0–1	13–8–4 (12–5–4)
February 13	at Holy Cross		Hart Center • Worcester, Massachusetts	L 2–3	13–9–4 (12–6–4)
February 19	at Fairfield		Wonderland of Ice • Bridgeport, Connecticut	W 8–4	14–9–4 (13–6–4)
February 20	Fairfield		Mark Edward Freitas Ice Forum • Storrs, Connecticut	W 6–4	15–9–4 (14–6–4)
February 26	at Canisius		Buffalo State Sports Arena • Buffalo, New York	W 3–2	16–9–4 (15–6–4)
February 27	at Canisius		Buffalo State Sports Arena • Buffalo, New York	W 5–3	17–9–4 (16–6–4)
March 5	Sacred Heart		Mark Edward Freitas Ice Forum • Storrs, Connecticut	W 7–1	18–9–4 (17–6–4)
March 6	at Sacred Heart		Milford Ice Pavilion • Milford, Connecticut	W 3–2	19–9–4 (18–6–4)
MAAC Tournament
March 13	Iona		Mark Edward Freitas Ice Forum • Storrs, Connecticut	W 6–5 ^{OT}	20–9–4
March 19	at Holy Cross		Hart Center • Worcester, Massachusetts	L 3–4 ^{OT}	20–10–4
*Non-conference game. ^{#}Rankings from USCHO.com Poll. All times are in Eastern Time.
