= 1998–99 Alabama–Huntsville Chargers men's ice hockey season =

American college ice hockey team season

1998–99 Alabama–Huntsville Chargers men's ice hockey

UConn Holiday Tournament Champions
- Conference: Independent
- Record: 21–5–1
- Head coach: Doug Ross (17th season)
- Home stadium: Von Braun Center

The 1998–99 Alabama–Huntsville Chargers ice hockey team represented the University of Alabama in Huntsville in the 1998–99 NCAA Division I men's ice hockey season. The Chargers were coached by Doug Ross who was in his seventeenth season as head coach. After six seasons in Division II, including two National Championships, UAH began play in as an independent in Division I, playing a schedule mixed with Division I and II teams. The Chargers played their home games in the Von Braun Center.

== Roster ==
No.	Nat.	Player	Class	Pos	Height	Weight	DoB	Hometown	Previous team
1		Cedric Billequey	Senior	G	6' 0" (1.83 m)	160 lb (73 kg)		Montreal, Quebec
2		Shane Stewart	Junior	D	6' 1" (1.85 m)	201 lb (91 kg)	1975-06-17	New Liskeard, Ontario
3		Dave Marcelli	Sophomore	D	6' 2" (1.88 m)	205 lb (93 kg)			Caledon (MetJHL)
4		Kevin Ridgeway	Freshman	D	6' 2" (1.88 m)	201 lb (91 kg)	1979-01-26	Ottawa, Ontario	Nepean (CJHL)
5		Jim Aluria	Junior	D	6' 2" (1.88 m)	216 lb (98 kg)	1975-05-04	Phoenix, Arizona	Illinois–Chicago (NCAA)
6		Tim McAllister	Junior	D	5' 10" (1.78 m)	181 lb (82 kg)		Kingston, Ontario	SUNY Canton (NJCAA)
7		Marc Lalonde	Junior	D	6' 1" (1.85 m)	174 lb (79 kg)		Cambridge, Ontario
8		Ryan Gavigan	Sophomore	F					Petrolia (WOHL)
9		Joe Provenzano	Senior	D	6' 1" (1.85 m)	181 lb (82 kg)	1975-03-29	Grosse Pointe, Michigan	Des Moines (USHL)
10		Darren Curry	Freshman	D	5' 9" (1.75 m)	190 lb (86 kg)	1977-03-10	Manotick, Ontario	Nepean (CJHL)
11		Nathan Bowen	Junior	F	6' 0" (1.83 m)	190 lb (86 kg)	1975-09-03	London, Ontario	Petrolia (WOHL)
12		Tom Williams	Sophomore	RW	5' 10" (1.78 m)	181 lb (82 kg)		Windsor, Ontario	Leamington (WOHL)
14		Ron Baker	Freshman	C	6' 0" (1.83 m)	181 lb (82 kg)	1977-02-02	Oshawa, Ontario	Bowmanville (OPJHL)
15		Jessi Otis	Freshman	LW	6' 1" (1.85 m)	205 lb (93 kg)	1978-03-09	Calgary, Alberta	Portage (MJHL)
16		Dwayne Blais	Sophomore	C	5' 10" (1.78 m)	190 lb (86 kg)	1977-07-12	London, Ontario	Markham (MetJHL)
17		Jay Woodcroft	Junior	C	6' 1" (1.85 m)	192 lb (87 kg)	1976-08-11	Toronto, Ontario	Markham (MetJHL)
18		Mark Motowski	Freshman	D	6' 3" (1.91 m)	201 lb (91 kg)	1974-10-13	Dearborn, Michigan	Illinois–Chicago (NCAA)
19		Mike Hamiln	Senior	RW				Flint, Michigan
20		Coiln Schmidt	Sophomore	LW	6' 0" (1.83 m)	201 lb (91 kg)		Stratford, Ontario
21		Ryan McCormack	Sophomore	RW	6' 0" (1.83 m)	181 lb (82 kg)	1978-03-04	Thunder Bay, Ontario	Portage (MJHL)
22		Jamie Baby	Senior	F				Parry Sound, Ontario	Muskoka (MetJHL)
23		James Kodrowski	Freshman	D	5' 11" (1.8 m)	201 lb (91 kg)	1979-09-26	Morristown, New Jersey	Great Falls (AWHL)
27		Ryan Stewart	Senior	F					Danville (NAHL)
30		Steve Briere	Sophomore	G	5' 8" (1.73 m)	159 lb (72 kg)	1977-03-25	Winnipeg, Manitoba	Sioux City (USHL)

== Regular season ==
=== Schedule ===
Date	Opponent	Site	Decision	Result	Attendance	Record
October 23	at Army*	Tate Rink • West Point, New York	Billequey	W 3–2 ^{OT}		1–0–0
October 24	at Army*	Tate Rink • West Point, New York	Briere	L 1–2		1–1–0
October 30	Oswego*	Von Braun Center • Huntsville, Alabama	Billequey	W 7–4	1,775	2–1–0
October 31	Oswego*	Von Braun Center • Huntsville, Alabama	Briere	W 4–3	1,001	3–1–0
November 6	Elmira*	Von Braun Center • Huntsville, Alabama	Billequey	W 5–1	1,482	4–1–0
November 7	Elmira*	Von Braun Center • Huntsville, Alabama	Briere	W 8–7	1,562	5–1–0
November 13	at Mankato State*	Mankato Civic Center • Mankato, Minnesota	Billequey	T 4–4 ^{OT}	3,132	5–1–1
November 14	at Mankato State*	Mankato Civic Center • Mankato, Minnesota	Billequey	L 2–5	3,321	5–2–1
November 27	New England College*	Von Braun Center • Huntsville, Alabama	Billequey	W 11–3	1,768	6–2–1
November 28	New England College*	Von Braun Center • Huntsville, Alabama	Billequey	W 11–3	1,592	7–2–1
December 11	Geneseo*	Von Braun Center • Huntsville, Alabama	Billequey	W 11–3	1,991	8–2–1
December 12	Geneseo*	Von Braun Center • Huntsville, Alabama	Briere	W 6–2	1,189	9–2–1
December 29	vs. Mercyhurst*	UConn Rink • Storrs, Connecticut (UConn Holiday Tournament)	Billequey	W 3–0	1,000	10–2–1
December 30	at Connecticut*	UConn Rink • Storrs, Connecticut (UConn Holiday Tournament)	Billequey	W 3–0	603	11–2–1
January 2	Babson*	Von Braun Center • Huntsville, Alabama	Briere	W 14–1	1,048	12–2–1
January 3	Babson*	Von Braun Center • Huntsville, Alabama	Billequey	W 6–4	979	13–2–1
January 9	Niagara*	Von Braun Center • Huntsville, Alabama	Billequey	W 4–3 ^{OT}	1,507	14–2–1
January 10	Niagara*	Von Braun Center • Huntsville, Alabama	Billequey	L 1–3	1,552	14–3–1
January 15	Concordia (Minn.)*	Von Braun Center • Huntsville, Alabama	Briere	W 5–3	1,924	15–3–1
January 16	Concordia (Minn.)*	Von Braun Center • Huntsville, Alabama	Billequey	W 4–2	3,873	16–3–1
January 23	St. Thomas*	Von Braun Center • Huntsville, Alabama	Billequey	W 6–4	1,322	17–3–1
January 24	St. Thomas*	Von Braun Center • Huntsville, Alabama	Briere	W 7–2	1,130	18–3–1
February 5	Findlay*	Von Braun Center • Huntsville, Alabama	Billequey	W 9–2	2,311	19–3–1
February 6	Findlay*	Von Braun Center • Huntsville, Alabama	Briere	W 7–4	2,566	20–3–1
February 19	at Niagara*	NU Ice Complex • Lewiston, New York	Billequey	L 1–2	939	20–4–1
February 20	at Niagara*	NU Ice Complex • Lewiston, New York	Billequey	L 2–3 ^{OT}	1,106	20–5–1
February 28	Bentley*	Von Braun Center • Huntsville, Alabama	Briere	W 14–4		21–5–1
*Non-conference game.

=== Standings ===
1998–99 Division I Independent ice hockey standings
	Conference							Overall					
	GP	W	L	T	PTS	GF	GA	GP	W	L	T	GF	GA
Air Force	0	0	0	0	-	-	-	36	15	19	2	113	128
Alabama–Huntsville	0	0	0	0	-	-	-	27	21	5	1	159	76
Army	0	0	0	0	-	-	-	34	15	16	3	130	103
Mankato State	0	0	0	0	-	-	-	39	18	16	5	149	129
Nebraska–Omaha	0	0	0	0	-	-	-	35	11	24	0	95	141
Niagara	0	0	0	0	-	-	-	32	17	12	3	103	85
Final rankings: USA Today/American Hockey Magazine Coaches Poll Top 10 Poll

=== Skaters ===
Player	Pos	Yr	GP	G	A	Pts	PIM
Mike Hamiln	RW	Sr		25	17	42	
Jay Woodcroft	C	Jr	27	19	19	38	
Nathan Bowen	F	Sr	27	18	18	36	
Shane Stewart	D	Sr	26	9	27	36	186
Ron Baker	C	Fr	27	9	13	22	46
Ryan McCormack	RW	So	21	6	16	22	
Dwayne Blais	C	So	25	4	18	22	
Jessi Otis	LW	Fr	25	3	12	15	28
Darren Curry	D	Fr	18	8	3	11	
Colin Schmidt	LW	So	10	2	7	9	
Kevin Ridgeway	D	Fr	22	1	4	5	36
James Krodrowski	D	Fr	11	1	3	4	2

=== Goaltenders ===
Player	Yr	GP	TOI	W	L	T	GA	GAA	SV	SV%	SO
Cedric Billequey	Sr	18		13	4	1		1.79		0.929	
Steve Briere	So	9		8	1	0					
