= Dessner =

Dessner is a surname. Notable people with the surname include:

- Aaron Dessner (born 1976), American songwriter, multi-instrumentalist, and record producer
- Bryce Dessner (born 1976), American composer and guitarist, twin brother of Aaron
- Jeff Dessner (born 1977), American ice hockey player
