= Brad Williamson (ice hockey) =

Canadian ice hockey player

- Born: March 9, 1977 (age 48); Thunder Bay, Ontario, Canada
- Height: 5 ft 11 in (180 cm)
- Weight: 181 lb (82 kg; 12 st 13 lb)
- Position: Defence
- Shot: Right
- Played for: AHL; Rochester Americans; IHL; Cincinnati Cyclones; Houston Aeros; ECHL; South Carolina Stingrays; CHL; Colorado Eagles; Germany; EV Ravensburg
- NHL draft: Undrafted
- Playing career: 1999–2009

Brad Williamson (born July 4, 1977) is a Canadian retired professional ice hockey defenceman.

== Awards and honors ==
Honours	Year
WCHA Defensive Player of the Year	1998–99
All-WCHA First Team	1998–99
AHCA West First-Team All-American	1998–99
CHL Most Outstanding Defenceman	2006–07

Awards and achievements
Preceded by Matt Henderson / Andy Sutton	WCHA Defensive Player of the Year; 1998–99	Succeeded by Jeff Dessner
