= 1998–99 NCAA Division I men's ice hockey season =

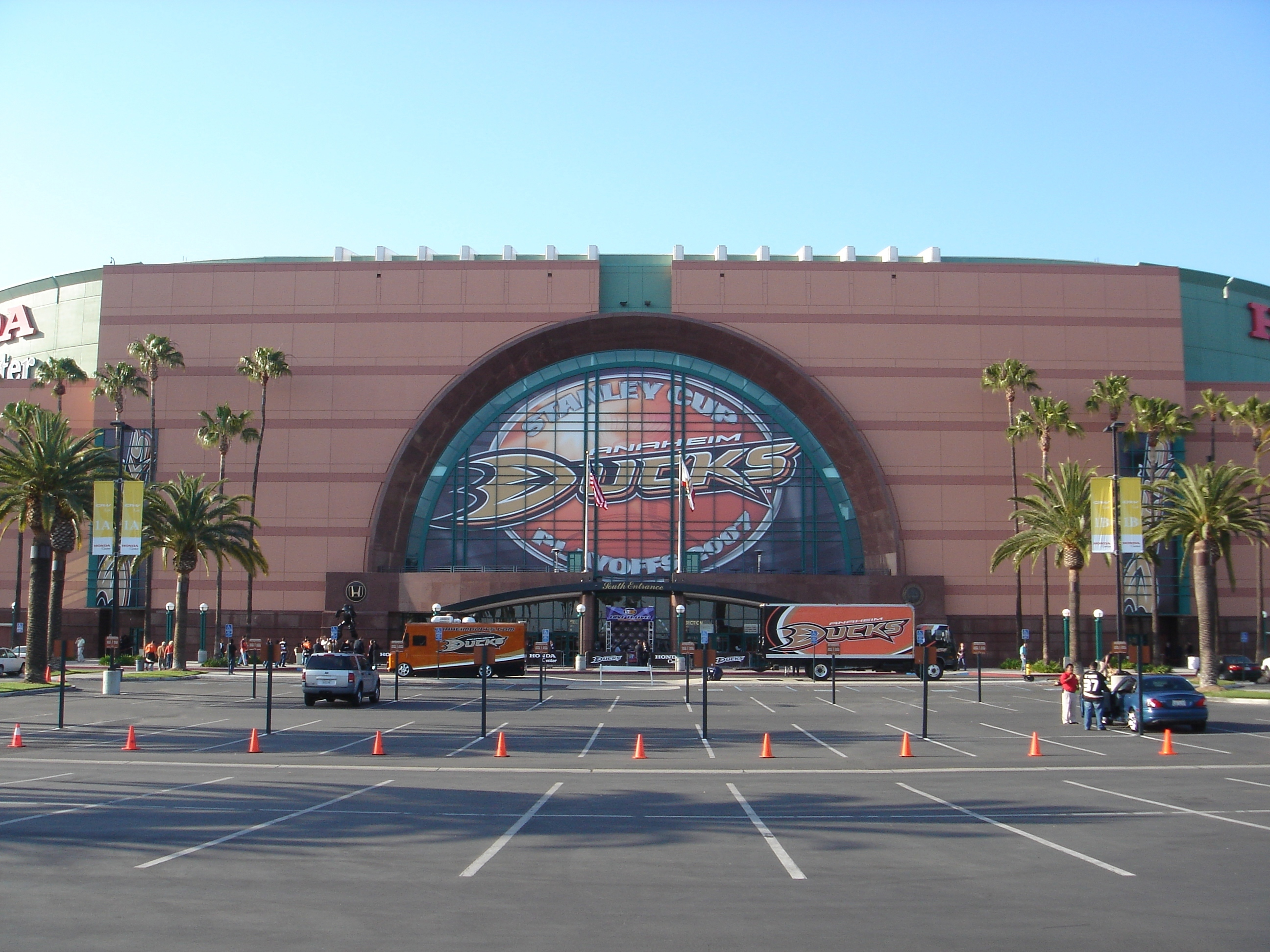
- The Arrowhead Pond of Anaheim in Anaheim, California, hosted the 1999 Frozen Four
- Duration: October 3, 1998– April 3, 1999
- NCAA tournament: 1999
- National championship: Arrowhead Pond of Anaheim; Anaheim, California
- NCAA champion: Maine
- Hobey Baker Award: Jason Krog (New Hampshire)

The 1998–99 NCAA Division I men's ice hockey season began on October 3, 1998, and concluded with the 1999 NCAA Division I Men's Ice Hockey Tournament's championship game on April 3, 1999, at the Arrowhead Pond of Anaheim in Anaheim, California. This was the 52nd season in which an NCAA ice hockey championship was held and is the 105th year overall where an NCAA school fielded a team.

The 1998-99 season was the inaugural year for Metro Atlantic Athletic Conference's hockey division. Because only Canisius, Fairfield, and Iona were full members of the MAAC, five additional associate members were included to make the conference viable. All five teams had been part of ECAC lower classifications in the past (as had Canisius, Fairfield and Iona) and were promoted to Division I for the 1998-99 season.

== Season Outlook ==
=== Pre-season polls ===
The top teams in the nation as ranked before the start of the season.

The WMPL Baker's Dozen poll was rebranded the WMPL/D&N Bank Baker's Dozen poll and was voted on by coaches. The U.S. College Hockey Online poll was voted on by coaches, media, and NHL scouts. The USA Today/American Hockey Magazine poll was voted on by coaches and media.

WMPL Poll
Rank	Team
1	Boston College (7)
2	North Dakota (2)
3	Maine
4	Colorado College
5	Notre Dame
6	Michigan State
7 (tie)	New Hampshire
7 (tie)	Northern Michigan
9	Michigan
10 (tie)	St. Lawrence
10 (tie)	Clarkson
12	Princeton
13	Minnesota

USCHO Poll
Rank	Team
1	Boston College (6)
2	Michigan (11)
3	North Dakota (10)
4	Ohio State (2)
5	Michigan State
6	Colorado College (1)
7	Clarkson
8	Maine
9	Boston University
10	Wisconsin

USA Today Poll
Rank	Team
1	Boston College
2	North Dakota
3	Colorado College
4	Maine
5	Michigan State
6	Northern Michigan
7	Notre Dame
8	New Hampshire
9	Michigan
10	St. Lawrence

== Regular season ==
=== Season tournaments ===
Tournament	Dates	Teams	Champion
Ice Breaker Tournament	October 9–10	4	Boston College
JCPenney Classic	October 24–25	4	Maine
Governor's Cup	November 27–28	4	Maine
College Hockey Showcase	November 27–29	4	
Great Lakes Invitational	December 26–27	4	Michigan State
Auld Lang Syne Classic	December 27–28	4	Vermont
Badger Showdown	December 27–28	4	Bowling Green
Denver Cup	December 27–28	4	Denver
Mariucci Classic	December 27–28	4	Princeton
Syracuse Invitational	December 27–28	4	Niagara
Rensselaer Holiday Tournament	December 28–29	4	Rensselaer
Silverado Shootout	January 2–3	4	Massachusetts–Lowell
Beanpot	February 1, 8	4	Boston University

=== Standings ===
1998–99 Central Collegiate Hockey Association standings
	Conference							Overall					
	GP	W	L	T	PTS	GF	GA	GP	W	L	T	GF	GA
#3 Michigan State†	30	20	3	7	47	91	40	42	29	6	7	121	56
#7 Michigan*	30	17	8	5	39	98	72	42	25	11	6	134	94
Ohio State	30	17	10	3	37	87	66	41	21	16	4	119	98
Notre Dame	30	15	11	4	34	92	68	38	19	14	5	114	100
Northern Michigan	30	14	11	5	33	94	83	42	22	15	5	143	112
Ferris State	30	13	12	5	31	76	69	36	14	16	6	89	87
Bowling Green	30	13	14	3	29	102	105	38	17	18	3	126	135
Lake Superior State	30	10	17	3	23	79	93	38	11	23	4	93	130
Miami	30	9	17	4	22	78	104	36	11	20	5	98	130
Western Michigan	30	5	17	8	18	69	119	34	6	20	8	75	130
Alaska-Fairbanks	30	8	21	1	17	77	124	34	11	22	1	94	131
Championship: Michigan † indicates conference regular season champion * indicates conference tournament champion Final rankings: USA Today/American Hockey Magazine Coaches Poll Top 10 Poll

1998–99 ECAC Hockey standings
	Conference							Overall					
	GP	W	L	T	PTS	GF	GA	GP	W	L	T	GF	GA
#9 Clarkson†*	22	18	4	0	36	91	48	37	25	11	1	133	102
#10 St. Lawrence	22	15	4	3	33	80	47	39	23	13	3	136	110
Rensselaer	22	13	7	2	28	89	62	37	23	12	2	147	110
Princeton	22	13	8	1	27	69	62	34	20	12	2	116	106
Yale	22	11	7	4	26	65	56	31	13	14	4	86	94
Colgate	22	12	8	2	26	66	56	35	19	12	4	109	87
Cornell	22	9	10	3	21	67	63	31	12	15	4	96	97
Harvard	22	8	12	2	18	64	87	32	14	16	2	94	115
Vermont	22	7	13	2	16	53	67	33	13	18	2	86	104
Brown	22	5	12	5	15	56	72	31	9	16	6	87	97
Dartmouth	22	6	14	5	14	60	79	29	10	17	2	90	109
Union	22	1	19	2	4	32	93	32	3	26	3	52	132
Championship: Clarkson † indicates conference regular season champion * indicates conference tournament champion (Whitelaw Cup); Final rankings: USA Today/American Hockey Magazine Coaches Poll Top 10 Poll

1998–99 Hockey East standings
	Conference							Overall					
	GP	W	L	T	PTS	GF	GA	GP	W	L	T	GF	GA
#2 New Hampshire†	24	18	3	3	39	100	49	41	31	7	3	171	91
#1 Maine	24	17	5	2	36	96	64	41	31	6	4	167	94
#4 Boston College*	24	15	7	2	32	99	73	43	27	12	4	170	125
Providence	24	12	11	1	25	90	81	38	20	17	1	159	134
Boston University	24	8	13	3	19	72	86	37	14	20	3	117	132
Massachusetts–Lowell	24	9	15	0	18	65	85	36	17	19	0	112	117
Massachusetts	24	8	14	2	18	56	86	35	12	21	2	80	114
Merrimack	24	7	16	1	15	67	94	36	11	24	1	107	136
Northeastern	24	6	16	2	14	74	101	34	11	20	3	108	132
Championship: Boston College † indicates conference regular season champion * indicates conference tournament champion Final rankings: USA Today/American Hockey Magazine Coaches Poll Top 10 Poll

1998–99 Division I Independent ice hockey standings
	Conference							Overall					
	GP	W	L	T	PTS	GF	GA	GP	W	L	T	GF	GA
Air Force	0	0	0	0	-	-	-	36	15	19	2	113	128
Alabama–Huntsville	0	0	0	0	-	-	-	27	21	5	1	159	76
Army	0	0	0	0	-	-	-	34	15	16	3	130	103
Mankato State	0	0	0	0	-	-	-	39	18	16	5	149	129
Nebraska–Omaha	0	0	0	0	-	-	-	35	11	24	0	95	141
Niagara	0	0	0	0	-	-	-	32	17	12	3	103	85
Final rankings: USA Today/American Hockey Magazine Coaches Poll Top 10 Poll

1998–99 Metro Atlantic Athletic Conference standings
	Conference							Overall					
	GP	W	L	T	PTS	GF	GA	GP	W	L	T	GF	GA
Quinnipiac†	28	22	4	2	46	131	63	34	26	6	2	161	81
Holy Cross*	28	19	6	3	41	107	63	35	22	9	4	126	89
Connecticut	28	18	6	4	40	106	70	34	20	10	4	122	95
Canisius	28	12	11	5	29	112	82	36	16	15	5	143	119
American International	28	11	13	4	26	92	93	32	12	16	4	101	113
Iona	28	12	15	1	25	116	115	33	13	18	2	145	143
Sacred Heart	28	7	20	1	15	81	128	31	7	23	1	86	139
Fairfield	28	1	27	0	2	55	186	32	1	31	0	64	227
Championship: Holy Cross † indicates conference regular season champion * indicates conference tournament champion Final rankings: USA Today/American Hockey Magazine Coaches Poll Top 10 Poll

1998–99 Western Collegiate Hockey Association standings
	Conference							Overall					
	GP	W	L	T	PTS	GF	GA	GP	W	L	T	GF	GA
#5 North Dakota†	28	24	2	2	50	142	76	40	32	6	2	199	104
#6 Colorado College	28	20	8	0	40	103	68	42	29	12	1	169	111
#8 Denver*	28	15	11	2	32	101	95	41	26	13	2	154	126
Wisconsin	28	13	12	3	29	76	81	38	15	19	4	98	110
Minnesota	28	10	12	6	26	90	99	43	15	19	9	139	157
Alaska-Anchorage	28	10	13	5	25	57	71	36	13	18	5	74	92
St. Cloud State	28	8	16	4	20	79	95	39	16	18	5	122	122
Michigan Tech	28	9	19	0	18	67	99	38	9	28	1	86	145
Minnesota-Duluth	28	4	20	4	12	71	102	38	7	27	4	100	139
Championship: Denver † indicates conference regular season champion * indicates conference tournament champion Final rankings: USA Today/American Hockey Magazine Coaches Poll Top 10 Poll

=== Final regular season polls ===
The WMPL poll was released before the conference tournaments. The USA Today and USCHO polls were released before the NCAA tournament.

WMPL / D&N Bank Poll
Ranking	Team
1	North Dakota (11)
2	Michigan State
3	Maine
4	New Hampshire
5	Colorado College
6	Clarkson
7	Boston College
8	St. Lawrence
9	Michigan
10	Ohio State
11	Denver
12	Notre Dame
13	Northern Michigan

USA Today / USA Hockey Magazine Poll
Ranking	Team
1	North Dakota
2	New Hampshire
3	Michigan State
4	Maine
5	Boston College
6	Clarkson
7	Michigan
8	Colorado College
9	Denver
10	St. Lawrence

USCHO Poll
Ranking	Team
1	North Dakota (28)
2	New Hampshire (2)
3	Michigan State
4	Maine
5	Boston College
6	Clarkson
7	Colorado College
8	Denver
9	Michigan
10	St. Lawrence

== 1999 NCAA Tournament ==
First Round
1	New Hampshire	–
–	bye	–
East Regional
4	Denver	3
5	Michigan	5
2	Michigan State	–
–	bye	–
West Regional
3	Colorado College	5
6	St. Lawrence	2
1	North Dakota	–
–	bye	–
West Regional
4	Boston College	2
5	Northern Michigan	1
2	Clarkson	–
–	bye	–
East Regional
3	Maine	4
6	Ohio State	2

Quarterfinals
1	New Hampshire	2*
5	Michigan	1
2	Michigan State	5
3	Colorado College	2
1	North Dakota	1
4	Boston College	2
2	Clarkson	2
3	Maine	7

Frozen Four
E1	New Hampshire	5
W2	Michigan State	3
W4	Boston College	1
E3	Maine	2*

National Championship
E1	New Hampshire	2
E3	Maine	3*

Note: * denotes overtime period(s)

== Player stats ==
=== Scoring leaders ===
The following players led the league in points at the conclusion of the season.

GP = Games played; G = Goals; A = Assists; Pts = Points; PIM = Penalty minutes

Player	Class	Team	GP	G	A	Pts	PIM
Jason Krog	Senior	New Hampshire	41	34	51	85	38
Jason Blake	Senior	North Dakota	38	28	41	69	49
Brian Swanson	Senior	Colorado College	42	25	41	66	28
Steve Kariya	Senior	Maine	41	23	42	65	24
Michael Souza	Junior	New Hampshire	41	23	42	65	38
Ryan Carter	Freshman	Iona	33	33	30	63	38
Darren Haydar	Freshman	New Hampshire	41	31	30	61	34
Brian Gionta	Sophomore	Boston College	39	27	33	60	46
Jeff Farkas	Junior	Boston College	43	32	25	57	56
Danny Riva	Senior	Rensselaer	36	22	34	56	35
Rejean Stringer	Senior	Merrimack	36	17	39	56	44

=== Leading goaltenders ===
The following goaltenders led the league in goals against average at the end of the regular season while playing at least 33% of their team's total minutes.

GP = Games played; Min = Minutes played; W = Wins; L = Losses; OT = Overtime/shootout losses; GA = Goals against; SO = Shutouts; SV% = Save percentage; GAA = Goals against average

Player	Class	Team	GP	Min	W	L	OT	GA	SO	SV%	GAA
Joe Blackburn	Sophomore	Michigan State	33	2012	21	5	7	52	3	.928	1.55
Ty Conklin	Sophomore	New Hampshire	22	1338	18	3	1	41	0	.923	1.84
Scott Simpson	Freshman	Holy Cross	22	1329	15	5	2	49	2	.918	2.21
Josh Blackburn	Freshman	Michigan	41	2408	25	10	6	91	3	.905	2.27
Shep Harder	Junior	Colgate	24	1395	15	7	1	53	1	.923	2.28
Gregg Naumenko	Freshman	Alaska-Anchorage	29	1692	11	13	5	65	1	.919	2.30
Alfie Michaud	Junior	Maine	37	2147	28	6	3	83	3	.910	2.32
Jeff Maund	Sophomore	Ohio State	38	2283	20	14	4	88	3	.921	2.34
Karl Goehring	Sophomore	North Dakota	31	1774	22	5	2	70	3	.915	2.37
Eric Heffler	Senior	St. Lawrence	37	2206	22	12	3	88	3	.930	2.39

== Awards ==
=== NCAA ===
Award		Recipient
Hobey Baker Memorial Award		Jason Krog, New Hampshire
Spencer T. Penrose Award		Dick Umile, New Hampshire
Most Outstanding Player in NCAA Tournament		Alfie Michaud, Maine
AHCA All-American Teams
East First Team	Position	West First Team
Eric Heffler, St. Lawrence	G	Joe Blackburn, Michigan State
David Cullen, Maine	D	Scott Swanson, Colorado College
Mike Mottau, Boston College	D	Brad Williamson, North Dakota
Brian Gionta, Boston College	F	Jason Blake, North Dakota
Steve Kariya, Maine	F	Brian Swanson, Colorado College
Jason Krog, New Hampshire	F	Mike York, Michigan State
East Second Team	Position	West Second Team
Michel Larocque, Boston University	G	Jeff Maund, Ohio State
Jayme Filipowicz, New Hampshire	D	Benoit Cotnoir, Notre Dame
Willie Mitchell, Clarkson	D	Mike Weaver, Michigan State
Erik Cole, Clarkson	F	Hugo Boisvert, Ohio State
Jeff Hamilton, Yale	F	Paul Comrie, Denver
Rejean Stringer, Merrimack	F	Jay Panzer, North Dakota

=== CCHA ===
Awards		Recipient
Player of the Year		Mike York, Michigan State
Best Defensive Forward		Mike York, Michigan State
Best Defensive Defenseman		Mike Weaver, Michigan State
Best Offensive Defenseman		Mike Jones, Bowling Green
Rookie of the Year		Mike Comrie, Michigan
Coach of the Year		Ron Mason, Michigan State
Terry Flanagan Memorial Award		Ernie Hartlieb, Miami
Most Valuable Player in Tournament		Mark Kosick, Michigan
All-CCHA Teams
First Team	Position	Second Team
Jeff Maund, Ohio State	G	Joe Blackburn, Michigan State
Mike Weaver, Michigan State	D	Mike Jones, Bowling Green
Benoit Cotnoir, Notre Dame	D	Andrè Signoretti, Ohio State
Hugo Boisvert, Ohio State	F	Dan Price, Bowling Green
Mike York, Michigan State	F	Ben Simon, Notre Dame
Adam Edinger, Bowling Green	F	J. P. Vigier, Northern Michigan
Rookie Team	Position	
Josh Blackburn, Michigan	G	
Jason Crain, Ohio State	D	
Jeff Jillson, Michigan	D	
Mike Comrie, Michigan	F	
David Inman, Notre Dame	F	
Adam Hall, Michigan State	F	
Chad Thuer, Northern Michigan	F	

=== ECAC ===
Award		Recipient
Player of the Year		Eric Heffler, St. Lawrence
Rookie of the Year		Brandon Dietrich, St. Lawrence
Coach of the Year		Joe Marsh, St. Lawrence
Best Defensive Defenseman		Jeff Burgoyne, Cornell
Best Defensive Forward		Syl Apps III, Princeton
Ken Dryden Award		Eric Heffler, St. Lawrence
Most Outstanding Player in Tournament		Willie Mitchell, Clarkson
All-ECAC Hockey Teams
First Team	Position	Second Team
Eric Heffler, St. Lawrence	G	Alex Westlund, Yale
Jeff Burgoyne, Cornell	D	Steve Shirreffs, Princeton
Willie Mitchell, Clarkson	D	Jason Reid, Vermont
Dan Riva, Rensselaer	F	Andy McDonald, Colgate
Erik Cole, Clarkson	F	Jeff Halpern, Princeton
Jeff Hamilton, Yale	F	Bob Prier, St. Lawrence
Rookie Team	Position	
Shawn Grant, Clarkson	G	
Kerry Ellis-Toddington, Clarkson	D	
Ray DiLaurio, St. Lawrence	D	
Denis Ladouceur, Cornell	F	
Jamie Herrington, Dartmouth	F	
Matt Murley, Rensselaer	F	
Brandon Deitrich, St. Lawrence	F	

=== Hockey East ===
Award		Recipient
Player of the Year		Jason Krog, New Hampshire
Rookie of the Year		Darren Haydar, New Hampshire
Bob Kullen Coach of the Year Award		Dick Umile, New Hampshire
Len Ceglarski Sportsmanship Award		Steve Kariya, Maine
Best Defensive Forward		Doug Nolan, Massachusetts-Lowell
Best Defensive Defenseman		Steve O'Brien, New Hampshire
William Flynn Tournament Most Valuable Player		Blake Bellefeuille, Boston College
All-Hockey East Teams
First Team	Position	Second Team
Michel Larocque, Boston University	G	Ty Conklin, New Hampshire
Jayme Filipowicz, New Hampshire	D	Mike Mottau, Boston College
David Cullen, Maine	D	Anthony Cappelletti, Massachusetts-Lowell
Brian Gionta, Boston College	F	Mike Omicioli, Providence
Jason Krog, New Hampshire	F	Rejean Stringer, Merrimack
Steve Kariya, Maine	F	Darren Haydar, New Hampshire
Rookie Team	Position	
Ty Conklin, New Hampshire	G	
Peter Metcalf, Maine	D	
Jim Fahey, Northeastern	D	
Darren Haydar, New Hampshire	F	
Barrett Heisten, Maine	F	
Willie Levesque, Northeastern	F	
Greg Classen, Merrimack	F	

=== MAAC ===
Award		Recipient
Offensive Player of the Year		Ryan Carter, Iona
Defensive Player of the Year		Dan Ennis, Quinnipiac
Goaltender of the Year		Scott Simpson, Holy Cross
Offensive Rookie of the Year		Ryan Carter, Iona
Defensive Rookie of the Year		Dan Ennis, Quinnipiac
Coach of the Year		Gary Wright, American International
Tournament Most Valuable Player		Mike Maguire, Holy Cross
All-MAAC Teams
First Team	Position	Second Team
Scott Simpson, Holy Cross	G	Chance Thede, American International
J.C. Wells, Quinnipiac	G	
Dan Ennis, Quinnipiac	D	Rob Martin, Connecticut
Derek Gilham, Canisius	D	Mike Maguire, Holy Cross
Kris Cumming, Quinnipiac	D	
Ryan Carter, Iona	F	Mike Sowa, American International
Geoff Angell, Connecticut	F	Neil Breen, Quinnipiac
Chris Fattey, Holy Cross	F	David Deeves, Canisius
Chad Poliquin, Quinnipiac	F	
Rookie Team	Position	
Jon Chain, Connecticut	G	
Dan Ennis, Quinnipiac	D	
Mike Boylan, Connecticut	D	
Joel Tarvudd, Canisius	D	
Ryan Carter, Iona	F	
Neil Breen, Quinnipiac	F	
Patrick Rissmiller, Holy Cross	F	
David Deeves, Canisius	F	

=== WCHA ===
Award		Recipient
Player of the Year		Jason Blake, North Dakota
Defensive Player of the Year		Brad Williamson, North Dakota
Rookie of the Year		Gregg Naumenko, Alaska-Anchorage
Student-Athlete of the Year		Kyle McLaughlin, St. Cloud State
Student-Athlete of the Year		Scott Swanson, Colorado College
Coach of the Year		Dean Blais, North Dakota
Most Valuable Player in Tournament		Stephen Wagner, Denver
All-WCHA Teams
First Team	Position	Second Team
Gregg Naumenko, Alaska-Anchorage	G	Karl Goehring, North Dakota
Brad Williamson, North Dakota	D	Dan Peters, Colorado College
Scott Swanson, Colorado College	D	Trevor Hammer, North Dakota
Brian Swanson, Colorado College	F	Jay Panzer, North Dakota
Jason Blake, North Dakota	F	Darren Clark, Colorado College
Paul Comrie, Denver	F	Jeff Panzer, North Dakota
Third Team	Position	Rookie Team
Graham Melanson, Wisconsin	G	Gregg Naumenko, Alaska-Anchorage
Jordan Leopold, Minnesota	D	Jordan Leopold, Minnesota
Jeff Dessner, Wisconsin	D	David Tanabe, Wisconsin
Wyatt Smith, Minnesota	F	Steve Cygan, Alaska-Anchorage
James Patterson, Denver	F	Jesse Heerema, Colorado College
Lee Goren, North Dakota	F	Tyler Arnason, St. Cloud State

== 1999 NHL entry draft ==
Round	Pick	Player	College	Conference	NHL team
1	14	Jeff Jillson	Michigan	CCHA	San Jose Sharks
1	16	Dave Tanabe	Wisconsin	WCHA	Carolina Hurricanes
1	20	Barrett Heisten	Maine	Hockey East	Buffalo Sabres
2	32	Michael Ryan ^{†}	Northeastern	Hockey East	Dallas Stars
2	38	Dan Cavanaugh ^{†}	Boston University	Hockey East	Calgary Flames
2	42	Mike Commodore	North Dakota	WCHA	New Jersey Devils
2	44	Jordan Leopold	Minnesota	WCHA	Mighty Ducks of Anaheim
2	51	Matt Murley	Rensselaer	ECAC Hockey	Pittsburgh Penguins
2	52	Adam Hall	Michigan State	CCHA	Nashville Predators
2	54	Andrew Hutchinson	Michigan State	CCHA	Nashville Predators
2	55	Doug Janik	Maine	Hockey East	Buffalo Sabres
2	59	David Inman	Notre Dame	CCHA	New York Rangers
3	74	Jason Crain	Ohio State	CCHA	Los Angeles Kings
3	81	Adam Hauser	Minnesota	WCHA	Edmonton Oilers
3	82	Mark Concannon ^{†}	Massachusetts–Lowell	Hockey East	San Jose Sharks
3	84	Brad Fast ^{†}	Michigan State	CCHA	Carolina Hurricanes
3	87	Brian Collins ^{†}	Boston University	Hockey East	New York Islanders
3	90	Patrick Aufiero ^{†}	Boston University	Hockey East	New York Rangers
3	91	Mike Comrie	Michigan	CCHA	Edmonton Oilers
4	97	Chris Dyment ^{†}	Boston University	Hockey East	Montreal Canadiens
4	111	Willie Levesque	Northeastern	Hockey East	San Jose Sharks
4	113	Ryan Murphy ^{†}	Bowling Green	CCHA	Carolina Hurricanes
4	115	Ryan Malone ^{†}	St. Cloud State	WCHA	Pittsburgh Penguins
5	135	Matt Doman	Wisconsin	WCHA	Calgary Flames
5	138	Ryan Miller ^{†}	Michigan State	CCHA	Buffalo Sabres
5	142	Will Magnuson	Lake Superior State	CCHA	Colorado Avalanche
5	143	Trevor Byrne ^{†}	Dartmouth	ECAC Hockey	St. Louis Blues
5	150	Matt Shasby ^{†}	Alaska–Anchorage	WCHA	Montreal Canadiens
5	153	Jesse Cook	Denver	WCHA	Tampa Bay Lightning
5	155	Niko Dimitrakos	Maine	Hockey East	San Jose Sharks
6	170	Matt Underhill	Cornell	ECAC Hockey	Calgary Flames
6	171	Chris Legg ^{†}	Brown	ECAC Hockey	Edmonton Oilers
6	172	Josh Reed ^{†}	Massachusetts–Lowell	Hockey East	Vancouver Canucks
6	175	Kyle Clark	Harvard	ECAC Hockey	Washington Capitals
6	176	Doug Meyer	Minnesota	WCHA	Pittsburgh Penguins
7	188	Stephen Bâby ^{†}	Cornell	ECAC Hockey	Atlanta Thrashers
7	195	Yorick Treille	Massachusetts–Lowell	Hockey East	Chicago Blackhawks
7	201	Mikko Ruutu ^{†}	Clarkson	ECAC Hockey	Ottawa Senators
7	203	Phil Osaer ^{†}	Ferris State	CCHA	St. Louis Blues
7	207	Greg Barber ^{†}	Denver	WCHA	Boston Bruins
7	214	Chris Hartsburg	Colorado College	WCHA	New Jersey Devils
8	216	Erkki Rajamäki ^{†}	Colgate	ECAC Hockey	Tampa Bay Lightning
8	221	Colin Hemingway ^{†}	New Hampshire	Hockey East	St. Louis Blues
8	222	George Parros ^{†}	Princeton	ECAC Hockey	Los Angeles Kings
8	231	David Evans	Clarkson	ECAC Hockey	Carolina Hurricanes
8	240	Jeff Finger ^{†}	St. Cloud State	WCHA	Colorado Avalanche
8	241	Douglas Murray ^{†}	Cornell	ECAC Hockey	San Jose Sharks
8	242	Justin Dziama	Boston College	Hockey East	New Jersey Devils
8	243	Brian Sullivan ^{†}	Northeastern	Hockey East	Dallas Stars
9	246	Ray DiLauro	St. Lawrence	ECAC Hockey	Atlanta Thrashers
9	248	Darren Haydar	New Hampshire	Hockey East	Nashville Predators
9	250	Noah Clarke ^{†}	Colorado College	WCHA	Los Angeles Kings
9	255	Brett Henning	Notre Dame	CCHA	New York Islanders
9	258	Brian Gornick	Air Force	Independent	Mighty Ducks of Anaheim
9	260	Brian McMeekin	Cornell	ECAC Hockey	St. Louis Blues
9	261	Andrew McPherson	Rensselaer	ECAC Hockey	Pittsburgh Penguins
9	267	Peter Metcalf	Maine	Hockey East	Toronto Maple Leafs
9	268	Tyler Scott ^{†}	New Hampshire	Hockey East	New York Islanders

† incoming freshman

== See also ==
- 1998–99 NCAA Division II men's ice hockey season
- 1998–99 NCAA Division III men's ice hockey season
