= Gregg Naumenko =

American ice hockey player

- Born: March 30, 1977 (age 49) Chicago, Illinois, US
- Height: 6 ft 2 in (188 cm)
- Weight: 200 lb (91 kg; 14 st 4 lb)
- Position: Goaltender
- Caught: Left
- Played for: Mighty Ducks of Anaheim
- National team: United States
- NHL draft: Undrafted
- Playing career: 1999–2007

Gregg Naumenko (born March 30, 1977, in Chicago, Illinois) is an American former professional ice hockey goaltender. He played two seasons for the USHL's North Iowa Huskies and one season for the University of Alaska Anchorage before beginning his professional career. He played two games for the Mighty Ducks of Anaheim in 2001, spending the majority of his career in the minor leagues.

== Playing career ==
Naumenko appeared in two NHL games in the 2000–01 season with the Mighty Ducks of Anaheim, recording an 0–1 record with a 6.00 GAA and a .759 save percentage. The majority of his career was spent in the AHL and ECHL.

He split the 2005–06 season between five teams: the AHL's Chicago Wolves, Portland Pirates, Albany River Rats, and Peoria Rivermen, and the ECHL's Dayton Bombers. He played for the ECHL's Trenton Titans in the 2006–07 season.

== International play ==
He represented the United States in 2002 IIHF World Championship. He played one game during the tournament, a 5–4 defeat against the Czech Republic.

== Post-playing career ==
Naumenko currently coaches at Admirals Hockey Club as a goalie coach. In August 2017, he was named an associate coach to the Omaha Lancers in the USHL.

== Career statistics ==
=== Regular season and playoffs ===
			Regular season										Playoffs
Season	Team	League	GP	W	L	T	OTL	MIN	GA	SO	GAA	SV%	GP	W	L	MIN	GA	SO	GAA	SV%
1994–95	Springfield Jr. Blues	NAHL	19	—	—	—	—	—	—	—	—	—	—	—	—	—	—	—	—	—
1995–96	North Iowa Huskies	USHL	27	15	12	0	—	1649	103	1	3.75	—	4	1	3	239	15	0	3.77	—
1996–97	North Iowa Huskies	USHL	25	11	11	1	—	1342	85	1	3.80	.877	6	3	2	284	19	0	4.01	.874
1997–98	North Iowa Huskies	USHL	38	23	11	3	—	2171	80	3	2.21	.911	5	4	1	299	11	0	2.21	.923
1998–99	University of Alaska-Anchorage	WCHA	29	11	13	5	—	1691	65	1	2.31	.920	—	—	—	—	—	—	—	—
1999–00	Cincinnati Mighty Ducks	AHL	50	17	25	7	—	2877	143	2	2.98	.906	—	—	—	—	—	—	—	—
2000–01	Mighty Ducks of Anaheim	NHL	2	0	1	0	—	70	7	0	5.99	.759	—	—	—	—	—	—	—	—
2000–01	Cincinnati Mighty Ducks	AHL	39	20	12	3	—	2079	101	2	2.91	.909	2	0	2	123	10	0	4.90	.868
2001–02	Augusta Lynx	ECHL	10	3	5	2	—	546	36	0	3.96	.880	—	—	—	—	—	—	—	—
2001–02	Dayton Bombers	ECHL	23	14	3	5	—	1347	58	1	2.58	.910	—	—	—	—	—	—	—	—
2001–02	Cincinnati Mighty Ducks	AHL	7	2	4	0	—	364	15	0	2.47	.928	—	—	—	—	—	—	—	—
2002–03	Cincinnati Cyclones	ECHL	17	6	6	3	—	913	47	1	3.09	.917	—	—	—	—	—	—	—	—
2003–04	Fort Wayne Komets	UHL	3	1	2	0	—	178	10	0	3.37	.851	—	—	—	—	—	—	—	—
2003–04	Augusta Lynx	ECHL	19	8	6	2	—	1069	55	0	3.09	.907	—	—	—	—	—	—	—	—
2003–04	Charlotte Checkers	ECHL	9	2	5	2	—	411	30	0	4.37	.860	—	—	—	—	—	—	—	—
2004–05	South Carolina Stingrays	ECHL	5	2	1	1	—	295	16	0	3.25	.904	3	1	1	128	9	0	4.21	.900
2005–06	Dayton Bombers	ECHL	6	3	3	—	3	339	18	0	3.19	.901	—	—	—	—	—	—	—	—
2005–06	Chicago Wolves	AHL	3	1	2	—	0	177	7	0	2.37	.885	—	—	—	—	—	—	—	—
2005–06	Portland Pirates	AHL	7	5	1	—	0	395	22	0	3.34	.894	—	—	—	—	—	—	—	—
2005–06	Albany River Rats	AHL	6	1	3	—	0	282	16	0	3.41	.906	—	—	—	—	—	—	—	—
2005–06	Peoria Rivermen	AHL	6	3	1	—	1	278	9	1	1.94	.916	1	0	0	17	3	0	10.55	.250
2006–07	Trenton Titans	ECHL	43	24	15	—	3	1227	121	1	2.91	.910	3	2	1	130	11	0	5.08	.851
NHL totals			2	0	1	0	—	71	7	0	5.99	.759	—	—	—	—	—	—	—	—

=== International ===
Year	Team	Event	GP	W	L	T	MIN	GA	SO	GAA	SV%
2002	United States	WC	1	—	—	—	29	4	0	8.21	.733
Senior totals			1	—	—	—	29	4	0	8.21	.733

== Awards and honors ==
Award	Year
All-WCHA Rookie Team	1998–99
All-WCHA First Team	1998–99

Awards and achievements
Preceded by Karl Goehring	WCHA Rookie of the Year; 1998–99	Succeeded by Dany Heatley
