= Adam Hall =

American ice hockey player (born 1980)

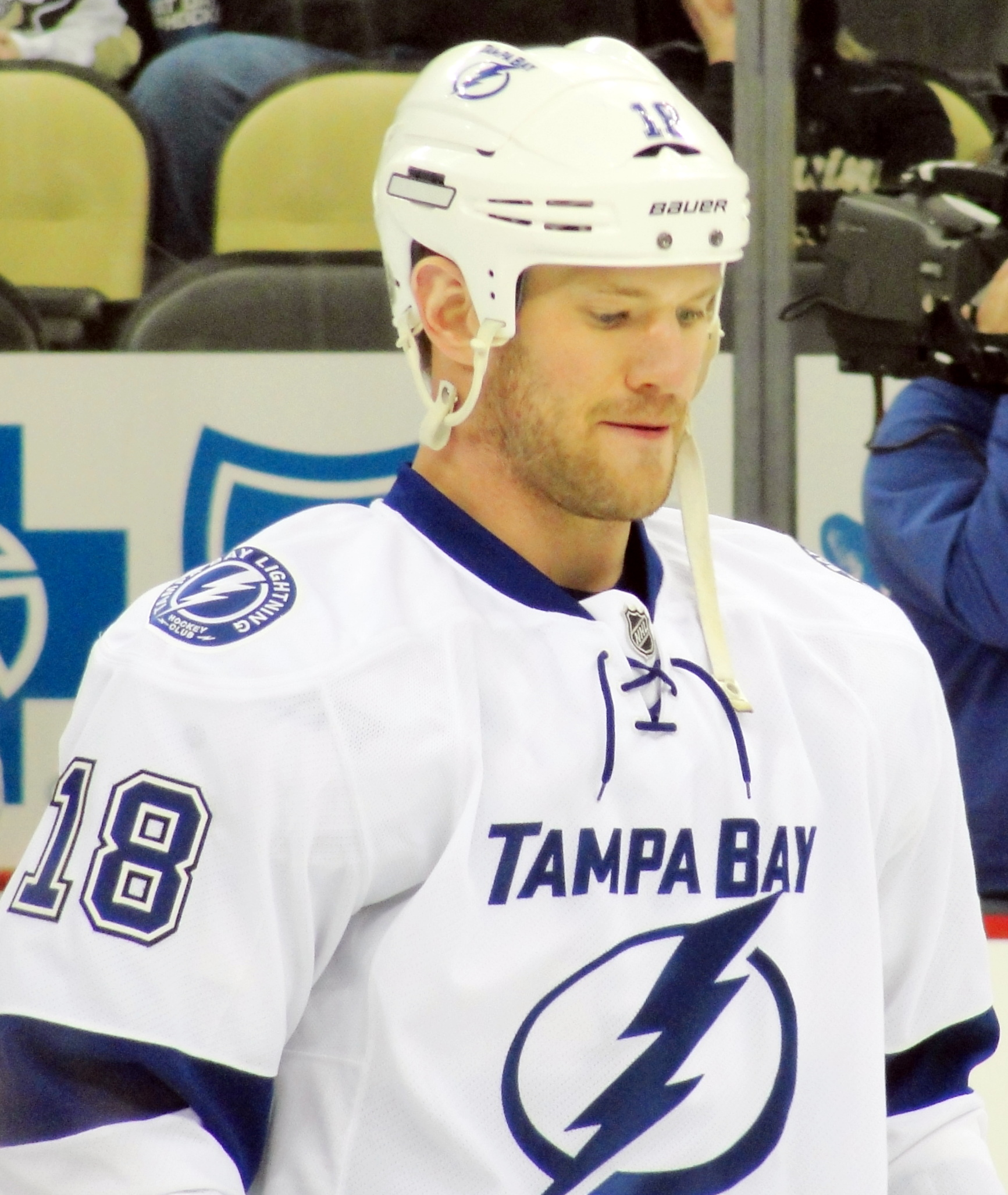
- Hall with the Lightning in 2012.
- Born: August 14, 1980 (age 45) Kalamazoo, Michigan, U.S.
- Height: 6 ft 3 in (191 cm)
- Weight: 212 lb (96 kg; 15 st 2 lb)
- Position: Right wing
- Shot: Right
- Played for: Nashville Predators; New York Rangers; Minnesota Wild; Pittsburgh Penguins; Tampa Bay Lightning; Carolina Hurricanes; Philadelphia Flyers; HC Ambrì-Piotta; KalPa
- National team: United States
- NHL draft: 52nd overall, 1999; Nashville Predators
- Playing career: 2002–2017

Adam John Hall (born August 14, 1980) is an American former professional ice hockey player. A second round selection of the Nashville Predators in the 1999 NHL entry draft, Hall played in the National Hockey League for the Nashville Predators, New York Rangers, Minnesota Wild, Pittsburgh Penguins, Tampa Bay Lightning, Carolina Hurricanes and Philadelphia Flyers. He finished his career in the National League (NL), playing three seasons for HC Ambrì-Piotta.

== Playing career ==
Hall was a member of the United States National Development Team Program, and twice represented the United States at the World Junior Ice Hockey Championships, in 1999 and 2000. He was selected 52nd overall by the Nashville Predators in the second round of the 1999 NHL entry draft. He played four years with the Michigan State Spartans and was named to the Central Collegiate Hockey Association's Second All-Star Team in 2000.

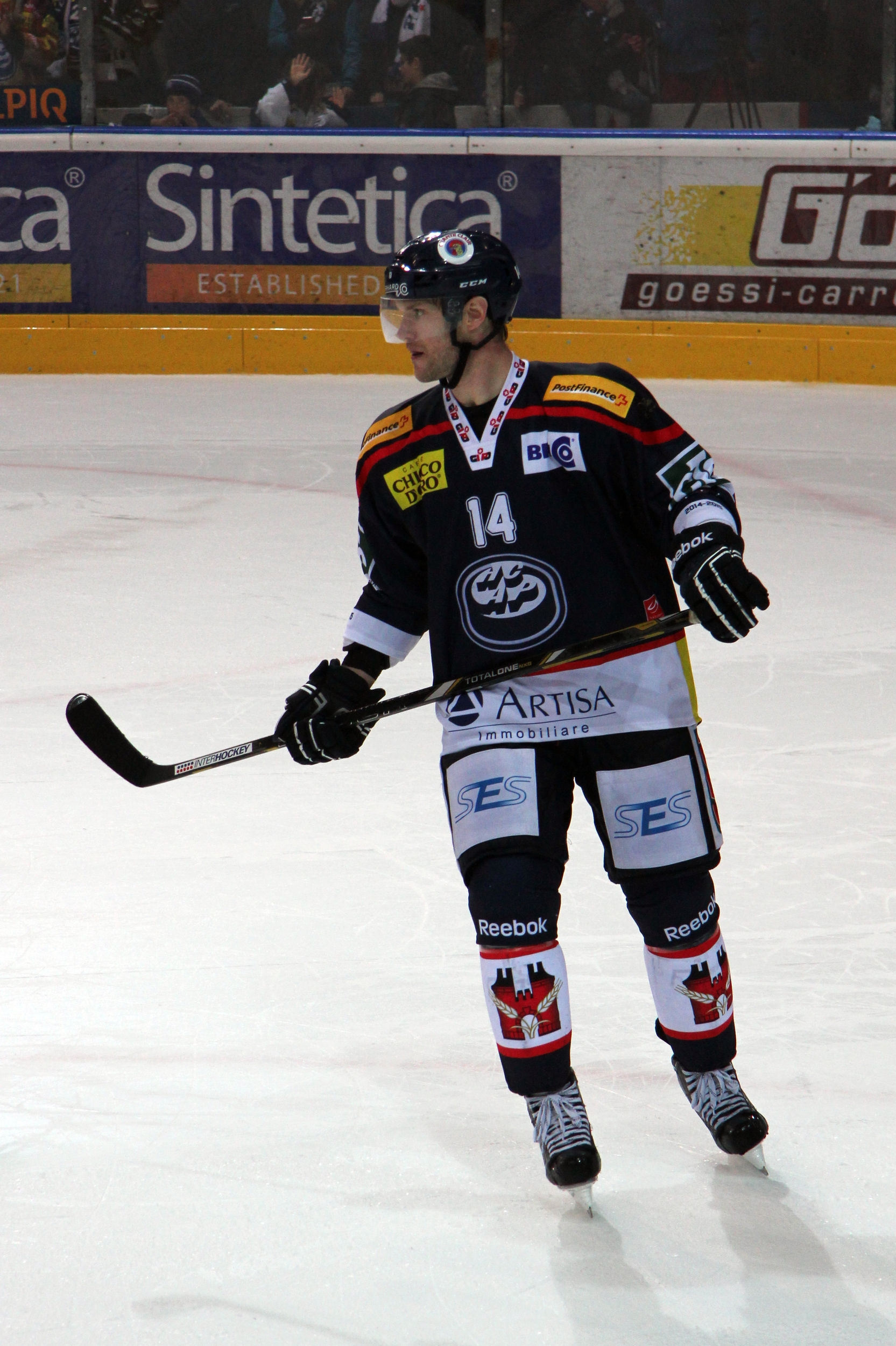
Adam Hall with Ambrì in 2014

He played his first NHL game for the Nashville Predators in 2001–02 after graduating from Michigan State. He scored 16 goals and 12 assists in 2002–03, his rookie season. After four seasons with the Predators, he was dealt to the New York Rangers in exchange for Dominic Moore prior to the 2006–07 NHL season. Hall played only half a season on Broadway, and was dealt to the Minnesota Wild for Pascal Dupuis in February 2007.

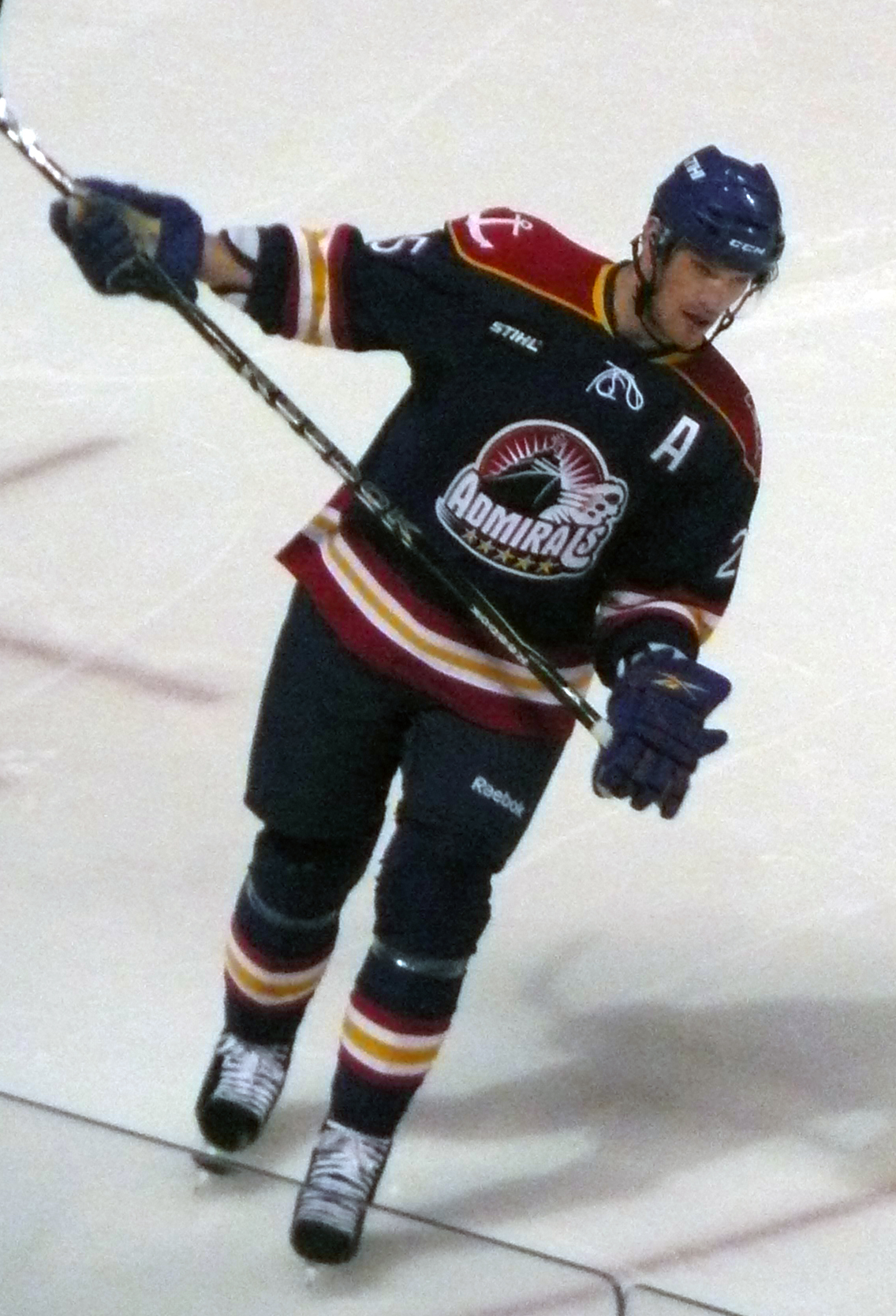
Hall with the Norfolk Admirals.

On October 1, 2007 he signed a one-year, two-way deal with the Pittsburgh Penguins and contributed during the Penguins run to the 2008 Stanley Cup Finals, where they lost in six games to the Detroit Red Wings. He left the Penguins following the season, signing a three-year deal with the Tampa Bay Lightning worth $1.8-million. Hall spent most of the 2009–10 season with the Lightning's AHL affiliate, the Norfolk Admirals.

In the following 2010–11 season, under new coach Guy Boucher, Hall played in all 82 games with the Lightning, recording seven goals and 18 points. He led the Lightning in face-off percentage with 55 percent and ranked fourth overall with 360 face-offs won. Hall also led the team with 152 hits and was third among forwards with 59 blocked shots. He was Tampa Bay's nominee for the Bill Masterton Memorial Trophy after battling his way back to the NHL. He was one of only four Bolts to play in all 82 games. The 30-year-old veteran also played in all 18 Stanley Cup Playoff games with the Lightning as they made it to within one game of the Stanley Cup Finals. He recorded a goal and five points during the postseason. On the 29th of June, Hall was re-signed to a one-year, one-way contract.

During the 2012 NHL lockout Hall was signed to his second European team on a temporary contract with EV Ravensburg Tower Stars of the German 2nd Bundesliga. Hall led the team in his tenure with the Tower Stars with 15 points in 17 games before returning to the Lightning for the shortened 2012–13 season. Twenty games into the season, Hall was placed on waivers and claimed by the Carolina Hurricanes on March 16, 2013.

On April 2, 2013, Hall was traded back to the Lightning along with a 7th-round draft pick for Marc-André Bergeron. The Lightning promptly placed him on waivers and he was claimed by the Philadelphia Flyers on April 3. Hall signed a one-year, $600,000 contract with the Flyers on July 4, 2013.

On August 2, 2014, Hall signed a one-year contract with HC Ambri-Piotta of the Swiss National League A. He prematurely agreed to a two-year contract extension on December 24, 2014, making him a Bianco-Blu through the end of the 2016-17 season. He finished his first season in Switzerland with 14 goals and 18 assists in 50 games. He helped the team to stay in the NLA tallying 5 points in 11 games in the relegation round. In the summer of 2015, he was named alternate captain of the team. In three seasons with the team, he played a total of 159 games, tallying 40 goals and 46 assists.

On July 4, 2017, Hall announced his retirement from professional hockey.

== Career statistics ==
=== Regular season and playoffs ===
			Regular season					Playoffs
Season	Team	League	GP	G	A	Pts	PIM	GP	G	A	Pts	PIM
1996–97	Newmarket Hurricanes	OPJHL	1	0	0	0	0	—	—	—	—	—
1996–97	Bramalea Blues	OPJHL	43	9	14	23	92	—	—	—	—	—
1997–98	U.S. NTDP Juniors	USHL	21	9	11	20	20	—	—	—	—	—
1997–98	U.S. NTDP U18	NAHL	15	12	1	13	20	6	3	2	5	4
1997–98	U.S. NTDP U18	USDP	29	18	9	27	19	—	—	—	—	—
1998–99	Michigan State Spartans	CCHA	36	16	7	23	74	—	—	—	—	—
1999–2000	Michigan State Spartans	CCHA	40	26	13	39	38	—	—	—	—	—
2000–01	Michigan State Spartans	CCHA	42	18	12	30	42	—	—	—	—	—
2001–02	Michigan State Spartans	CCHA	41	19	15	34	36	—	—	—	—	—
2001–02	Milwaukee Admirals	AHL	6	2	2	4	4	—	—	—	—	—
2001–02	Nashville Predators	NHL	1	0	1	1	0	—	—	—	—	—
2002–03	Milwaukee Admirals	AHL	1	0	0	0	2	—	—	—	—	—
2002–03	Nashville Predators	NHL	79	16	12	28	31	—	—	—	—	—
2003–04	Nashville Predators	NHL	79	13	14	27	37	6	2	1	3	2
2004–05	KalPa	Mestis	36	23	17	40	28	9	2	3	5	4
2005–06	Nashville Predators	NHL	75	14	15	29	40	5	1	0	1	0
2006–07	New York Rangers	NHL	49	4	8	12	18	—	—	—	—	—
2006–07	Minnesota Wild	NHL	23	2	3	5	8	3	0	0	0	7
2007–08	Pittsburgh Penguins	NHL	46	2	4	6	24	17	3	1	4	8
2008–09	Tampa Bay Lightning	NHL	74	5	5	10	29	—	—	—	—	—
2009–10	Norfolk Admirals	AHL	79	16	25	41	47	—	—	—	—	—
2010–11	Tampa Bay Lightning	NHL	82	7	11	18	32	18	1	4	5	8
2011–12	Tampa Bay Lightning	NHL	57	2	5	7	17	—	—	—	—	—
2012–13	Ravensburg Towerstars	2.GBun	17	11	4	15	39	—	—	—	—	—
2012–13	Tampa Bay Lightning	NHL	20	0	4	4	23	—	—	—	—	—
2012–13	Carolina Hurricanes	NHL	6	0	0	0	0	—	—	—	—	—
2012–13	Philadelphia Flyers	NHL	11	0	0	0	0	—	—	—	—	—
2013–14	Philadelphia Flyers	NHL	80	4	5	9	23	7	0	1	1	7
2014–15	HC Ambrì–Piotta	NLA	50	14	18	32	34	—	—	—	—	—
2015–16	HC Ambrì–Piotta	NLA	40	11	10	21	24	—	—	—	—	—
2016–17	HC Ambrì–Piotta	NLA	38	11	9	20	22	—	—	—	—	—
NHL totals			682	69	87	156	282	56	7	7	14	32

=== International ===
Medal record

Representing United States

Ice hockey

World Championships
Bronze medal – third place	2004 Prague	

World Junior Championships
Bronze medal – third place	2000 Skellefteå	

Year	Team	Event	Result	GP	G	A	Pts	PIM
1999	United States	WJC	8th	6	0	1	1	2
2000	United States	WJC	4th	7	2	0	2	4
2003	United States	WC	13th	6	3	1	4	0
2004	United States	WC	3rd place, bronze medalist(s)	9	0	2	2	0
2005	United States	WC	6th	7	1	0	1	2
2006	United States	WC	7th	7	0	0	0	0
2007	United States	WC	5th	7	0	1	1	2
Junior totals				13	2	1	3	6
Senior totals				36	4	4	8	4

== Awards and honors ==
Award	Year
College
All-CCHA Rookie Team	1999
All-CCHA Second Team	2000
CCHA All-Tournament Team	2001
