= Joe Blackburn =

American ice hockey player (born 1979)

- Born: January 26, 1979 (age 47) Livonia, Michigan, USA
- Height: 5 ft 11 in (180 cm)
- Weight: 168 lb (76 kg; 12 st 0 lb)
- Position: Goaltender
- Caught: Right
- Playing career: 1997–2001
- Coaching career

Biographical details
- Education: Michigan State University

Coaching career (HC unless noted)
- 2001–2003: Michigan State (volunteer assistant)

Joseph Blackburn is an American former ice hockey goaltender who was an All-American for Michigan State.

== Career ==
Blackburn's college career began in the fall of 1997. As a freshman he served as the backup goaltender for Michigan State, playing behind Chad Alban. He saw limited time behind Alban, who finished the year as the runner-up for the Hobey Baker Award, but performed well in his few appearances. After Alban graduated, Blackburn won the starting job and posted even better number than Alban. He took some time off around Christmas to play with the US national team at the World Junior Championships. He played alright in relief, with both games he was credited with, but couldn't help the team finish better than 8th.

Back in East Lansing, his stellar year saw him earn All-American honors while he backstopped MSU to a regular season CCHA championship and a #3 ranking. He helped the Spartans win their first tournament game, breaking a streak of six consecutive losses, and reach the Frozen Four. Despite Blackburn seemingly having a lock on the Spartans' net, one of the top goaltending prospects in the country, Ryan Miller, had already committed to Michigan State (as had many Miller family members before him). Blackburn ended up sharing the goal with Miller during his junior season. While Blackburn's numbers declined, they were still good. Miller, however, put up one of the best goaltending performances by a freshman, leading the nation in goals against average and putting up 8 shutouts in just 26 games. There was little surprise when Blackburn was relegated to spot duty during his senior season while Miller went on to become just the second goaltender to take home the Hobey Baker Award.

Blackburn's playing career ended when he graduated, however, he remained with the game as a volunteer assistant for the Spartans. While working in that capacity, he enrolled in the School of Labor and Industrial Relations and earned an MS in 2003.

After his six years at Michigan State, Blackburn embarked on a career in human resources, working for both General Electric and PepsiCo. Currently he's the vice president of human resources for the Community Health Center in Middletown, Connecticut (as of 2021).

== Statistics ==
=== Regular season and playoffs ===
			Regular season									Playoffs
Season	Team	League	GP	W	L	T	MIN	GA	SO	GAA	SV%	GP	W	L	MIN	GA	SO	GAA	SV%
1996–97	Detroit Compuware Ambassadors	NAHL	25	19	5	1	1487	72	0	2.91	.910	—	—	—	—	—	—	—	—
1997–98	Michigan State	CCHA	5	2	2	0	242	9	0	2.23	.889	—	—	—	—	—	—	—	—
1998–99	Michigan State	CCHA	33	21	5	7	2013	52	3	1.55	.928	—	—	—	—	—	—	—	—
1999–00	Michigan State	CCHA	18	11	6	1	1025	37	1	2.17	.907	—	—	—	—	—	—	—	—
2000–01	Michigan State	CCHA	3	2	0	0	123	2	0	0.97	.967	—	—	—	—	—	—	—	—
NCAA totals			59	36	13	8	3,403	100	4	1.76	.920	—	—	—	—	—	—	—	—

=== International ===
Year	Team	Event	GP	W	L	T	MIN	GA	SO	GAA	SV%
1999	United States	WJC	3	2	0	0	139	7	0	3.03	.909

== Awards and honors ==
Award	Year
All-CCHA Second Team	1998–99
AHCA East First-Team All-American	1998–99
