= Karl Goehring =

American ice hockey player

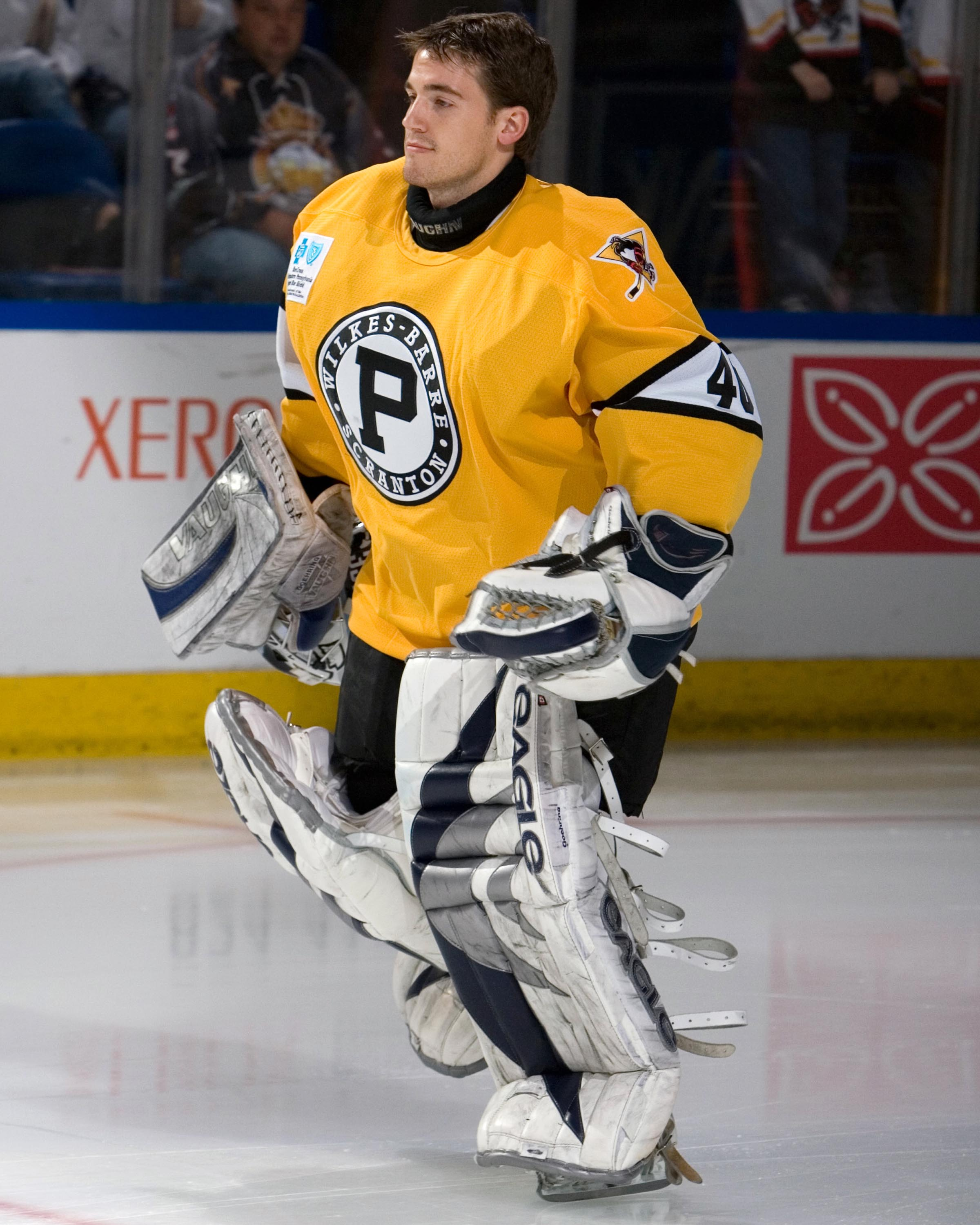
- Goehring with the Wilkes-Barre/Scranton Penguins in 2007
- Born: August 23, 1978 (age 48) Apple Valley, Minnesota, USA
- Height: 5 ft 8 in (173 cm)
- Weight: 160 lb (73 kg; 11 st 6 lb)
- Position: Goaltender
- Caught: Left
- Played for: Syracuse Crunch; Jokerit; San Antonio Rampage; Milwaukee Admirals; WBS Penguins; Norfolk Admirals; Manitoba Moose
- National team: United States
- NHL draft: Undrafted
- Playing career: 2001–2009
- Coaching career

Current position
- Title: Assistant Coach
- Team: St. Thomas
- Conference: CCHA

Biographical details
- Education: University of North Dakota

Coaching career (HC unless noted)
- 2009–2010: Syracuse Crunch (goaltending)
- 2010–2017: North Dakota (volunteer assistant)
- 2017–2019: Syracuse Crunch (goaltending)
- 2019–2025: North Dakota (assistant)
- 2025–present: St. Thomas (assistant)

Karl Goehring (born August 23, 1978, in Apple Valley, Minnesota) is a retired American professional ice hockey goaltender who is an assistant coach with the St. Thomas Tommies of the CCHA. He led Apple Valley High School to a win in the 1996 Minnesota State High School League Boys' Hockey Tournament. He also led the University of North Dakota to a win in the 2000 NCAA Men's Ice Hockey Championship.

== Playing career ==
Goehring played four seasons for the Syracuse Crunch in the AHL, and following the abrupt departure of Tim Thomas from Jokerit in the Finnish SM-liiga, he signed with Jokerit for the 2005–06 season. Goehring was recommended to Jokerit management by Tim Thomas as a winning goaltender, but Goehring played a disappointing early season and was taken off goaltending duties in November. On November 18, 2005, he signed with the San Antonio Rampage in the AHL. Goehring was signed by the Nashville Predators on November 23, 2006, and reassigned to the Milwaukee Admirals four days later.

Goehring was released from Wilkes-Barre/Scranton on November 13, 2007. He signed a professional tryout contract (PTO) with the Norfolk Admirals on November 20, 2007. Goehring then signed a professional tryout contract with the Syracuse Crunch. On March 3, 2008, Goehring was named AHL Player of the Week. On July 3, 2008, Goehring was signed by the Manitoba Moose of the American Hockey League.

== Coaching career ==
Goehring had offers to play in Germany in the 2009–10 season, but instead of waiting to see if more opportunities arose closer to the beginning of the season on July 24, 2009, he retired from professional hockey to begin his career in coaching. He took up an assistant coaching role with the Syracuse Crunch of the AHL, with whom he set franchise records for most games played by a goaltender (176) and wins (78) during his four-year stint with the team as a player. The Crunch later let go Goehring and the rest of their coaching staff. He returned to the Crunch before the 2017-18 season following Crunch goaltending coach David Alexander's departure to the St. Louis Blues.

After two seasons with the Crunch, he returned to his alma mater to become a full-time assistant coach with the UND Fighting Hawks. Goehring was not retained by incoming UND head coach Dane Jackson after Brad Berry was fired, and announced that he would not return to UND for the following season on March 31, 2025. Goehring was hired as an assistant coach at St. Thomas under head coach Enrico Blasi in August 2025.

== Personal life ==
Goehring is the father of Lily Kate, who won episode 4 of NBC's Dancing with Myself.

== Awards and honors ==
Award	Year
USHL Dave Tyler Junior Player of the Year Award	1997
All-WCHA Rookie Team	1997–98
All-WCHA First Team	1997–98
AHCA West Second-Team All-American	1997–98
All-WCHA Second Team	1998–99
All-WCHA First Team	1999–00
AHCA West First-Team All-American	1999–00
All-NCAA All-Tournament Team	2000

Awards and achievements
Preceded by Brant Nicklin	WCHA Rookie of the Year; 1997–98	Succeeded by Gregg Naumenko
Preceded by Jeff Scissons	WCHA Student-Athlete of the Year; 2000–01	Succeeded by Mark Cullen
