= David Cullen (ice hockey) =

Canadian ice hockey player (born 1976)

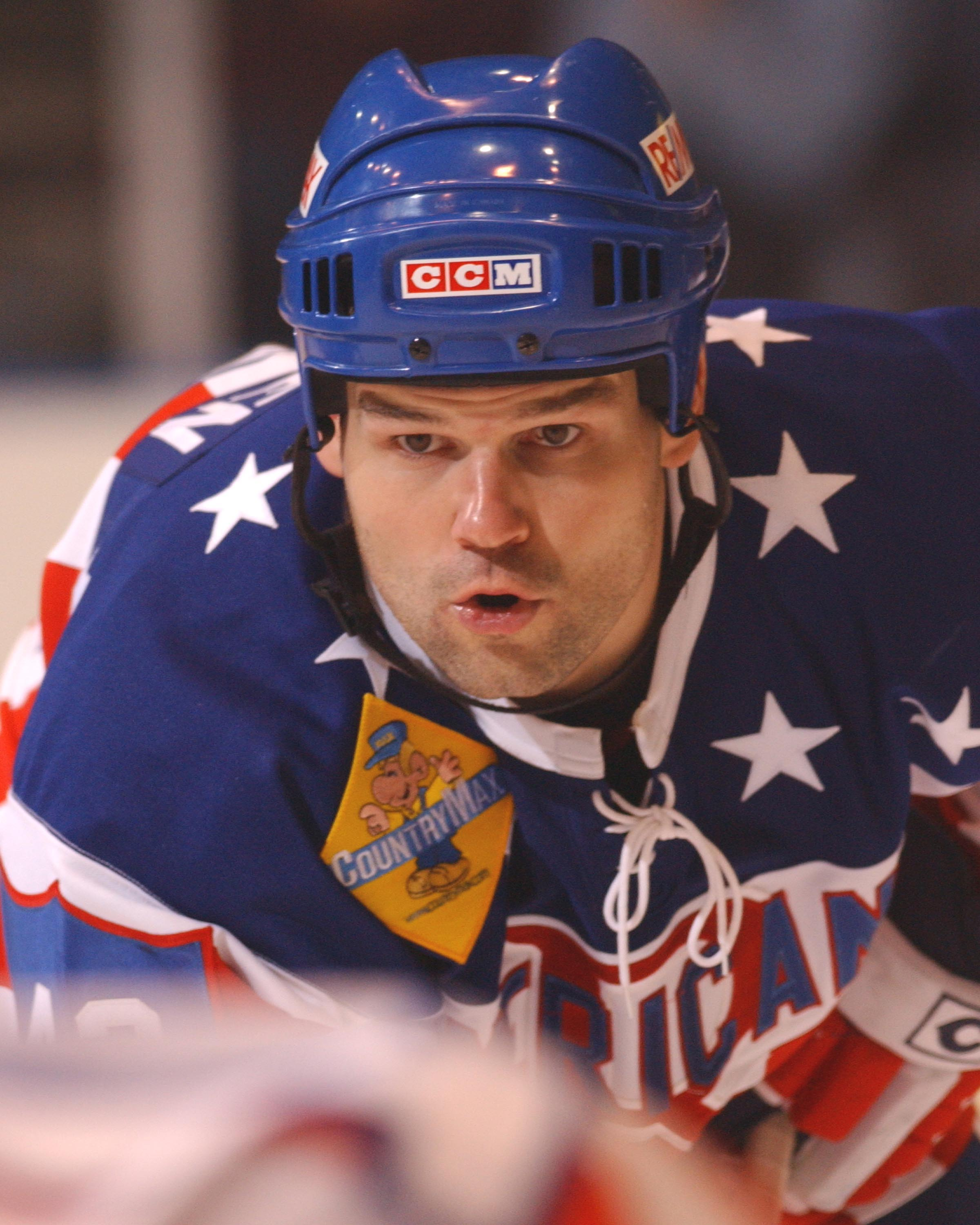
- Cullen with the Rochester Americans in 2004
- Born: December 30, 1976 (age 49) St. Catharines, Ontario, Canada
- Height: 6 ft 2 in (188 cm)
- Weight: 198 lb (90 kg; 14 st 2 lb)
- Position: Defence
- Shot: Right
- Played for: Phoenix Coyotes (NHL); Minnesota Wild (NHL); DEG Metro Stars (DEL); Färjestads BK (SEL); Graz 99ers (EBEL)
- NHL draft: Undrafted
- Playing career: 1999–2010

David Cullen (born December 30, 1976) is a Canadian former professional ice hockey defenceman. He attended Medaille College between 2010 and 2011, earning a master's degree in Education.

== Playing career ==
Cullen played 16 games in the National Hockey League for the Phoenix Coyotes who signed him as an undrafted free-agent in 1999, scoring no points and collecting 6 penalty minutes. He mainly played for the Coyotes' AHL affiliate the Springfield Falcons.

On January 4, 2002, Cullen was traded to the Minnesota Wild for Sébastien Bordeleau and played 3 games for the Wild scoring no points and no penalty minutes as he spent most of his time again in the AHL, this time with the Houston Aeros. After 2 seasons in the Wild organization, he spent a further 3 seasons in the AHL with the Rochester Americans before moving to Europe in 2006, playing in Germany's Deutsche Eishockey Liga for the DEG Metro Stars, and in August 2007 he signed with the Swedish team Färjestads BK. But only after four months with Färjestad he and the club decided to terminate the contract and Cullen left the team. Cullen spent the rest of the year with the Syracuse Crunch of the AHL.

On July 6, 2008, Cullen signed a contract with Austrian team, Graz 99ers.

== Awards and honors ==
Award	Year
All-Hockey East First Team	1998–99
AHCA East First-Team All-American	1998–99
All-NCAA All-Tournament Team	1999

== Career statistics ==
=== Regular season and playoffs ===
			Regular season					Playoffs
Season	Team	League	GP	G	A	Pts	PIM	GP	G	A	Pts	PIM
1995–96	University of Maine	HE	34	2	4	6	22	—	—	—	—	—
1996–97	University of Maine	HE	35	5	25	30	8	—	—	—	—	—
1997–98	University of Maine	HE	36	10	27	37	24	—	—	—	—	—
1998–99	University of Maine	HE	41	11	33	44	24	—	—	—	—	—
1999–00	Springfield Falcons	AHL	78	10	21	31	57	2	0	0	0	2
2000–01	Springfield Falcons	AHL	69	13	29	42	40	—	—	—	—	—
2000–01	Phoenix Coyotes	NHL	2	0	0	0	0	—	—	—	—	—
2001–02	Springfield Falcons	AHL	15	1	4	5	4	—	—	—	—	—
2001–02	Phoenix Coyotes	NHL	14	0	0	0	6	—	—	—	—	—
2001–02	Houston Aeros	AHL	38	5	15	20	4	13	0	6	6	6
2001–02	Minnesota Wild	NHL	3	0	0	0	0	—	—	—	—	—
2002–03	Houston Aeros	AHL	72	2	27	29	42	23	3	4	7	14
2003–04	Rochester Americans	AHL	75	12	35	47	26	16	1	4	5	6
2004–05	Rochester Americans	AHL	43	2	19	21	25	9	2	3	5	4
2005–06	Rochester Americans	AHL	68	5	28	33	72	—	—	—	—	—
2006–07	DEG Metro Stars	DEL	51	4	15	19	73	9	1	2	3	2
2007–08	Färjestads BK	SEL	18	0	4	4	22	—	—	—	—	—
2007–08	Syracuse Crunch	AHL	39	3	8	11	42	11	1	4	5	8
NHL totals			19	0	0	0	6	—	—	—	—	—
