= Jeff Dessner =

American ice hockey player (born 1977)

- Born: April 16, 1977 (age 49) Skokie, Illinois, USA
- Height: 6 ft 2 in (188 cm)
- Weight: 192 lb (87 kg; 13 st 10 lb)
- Position: Defenseman
- Shot: Left
- Played for: Chicago Wolves; Greenville Grrrowl; Iserlohn Roosters; Kölner Haie
- NHL draft: 185th overall, 1996; New York Rangers
- Playing career: 1996–2004

Jeffrey Dessner is an American former ice hockey defenseman who was an All-American for Wisconsin.

== Career ==
Dessner was a highly-regarded prospect coming out of high school, being selected in the 7th round of the NHL Draft prior to attending Wisconsin. Unfortunately, a back injury forced Dessner to miss the entire 96–97 season. He did eventually return to the ice as a redshirt freshman (a rarity in college hockey) in 1998, but only played half of the season. In his third year, Dessner finally got back on track and began to demonstrate the talent that had the New York Rangers select him in the draft. He was named as an alternate captain as a senior and performed well on both ends of the ice. Not only did he lead the Badgers' defensemen in scoring, but he was named as the best defender in the WCHA. He helped Wisconsin finish atop the WCHA standings for just the third time in 32 years and produce the program's sixth 30-win season. He was named an All-American for the season and some were expecting him to sign with the Rangers after the year. Dessner, however, still had a year of eligibility remaining and decided to return to Madison for a 4th season. Now team captain, Dessner didn't have quite as outstanding of a campaign in 2001; Wisconsin finished in the middle of the WCHA standings, allowing 20 more goals over the course of the season.

After his college career was over, Dessner's rights were traded to the Atlanta Thrashers for an 8th-round pick. He played one season in their minor league system before heading to Europe and playing two years in Germany. Dessner retired from the game in 2004.

In 2006, Dessner joined Karl Storz SE as a sales associate and worked his way up to regional manager (as of 2021).

== Statistics ==
=== Regular season and playoffs ===
			Regular Season					Playoffs
Season	Team	League	GP	G	A	Pts	PIM	GP	G	A	Pts	PIM
1992–93	Taft School	US-Prep	—	—	—	—	—	—	—	—	—	—
1993–94	Taft School	US-Prep	—	—	—	—	—	—	—	—	—	—
1994–95	Taft School	US-Prep	—	—	—	—	—	—	—	—	—	—
1995–96	Taft School	US-Prep	25	12	18	30	—	—	—	—	—	—
1996–97	Wisconsin	WCHA	DNP - injured
1997–98	Wisconsin	WCHA	19	1	3	4	43	—	—	—	—	—
1998–99	Wisconsin	WCHA	37	7	14	21	46	—	—	—	—	—
1999–00	Wisconsin	WCHA	40	11	15	26	46	—	—	—	—	—
2000–01	Wisconsin	WCHA	39	7	12	19	58	—	—	—	—	—
2001–02	Chicago Wolves	AHL	40	1	11	12	80	—	—	—	—	—
2001–02	Greenville Grrrowl	ECHL	5	1	2	3	8	13	3	5	8	10
2002–03	Iserlohn Roosters	DEL	35	8	12	20	82	—	—	—	—	—
2003–04	Kölner Haie	DEL	52	5	14	19	72	6	0	1	1	6
NCAA totals			135	26	44	70	208	—	—	—	—	—
DEL totals			87	13	26	39	154	6	0	1	1	6

== Awards and honors ==
Award	Year
All-WCHA Third Team	1998–99
All-WCHA First Team	1999–00
AHCA West First-Team All-American	1999–00

Awards and achievements
Preceded by Brad Williamson	WCHA Defensive Player of the Year; 1999–00	Succeeded by Jordan Leopold
