= Peter Metcalf =

American ice hockey player (born 1979)

- Born: February 25, 1979 (age 47) Pembroke, Massachusetts, USA
- Height: 6 ft 0 in (183 cm)
- Weight: 201 lb (91 kg; 14 st 5 lb)
- Position: Defense
- Shot: Left
- Played for: AHL; Providence Bruins; ECHL; Trenton Titans; Idaho Steelheads; Utah Grizzlies; Alaska Aces; Florida Everblades
- NHL draft: 267th overall, 1999; Toronto Maple Leafs
- Playing career: 2002–2010

Peter Metcalf (born February 25, 1979) is an American former ice hockey player who played eight seasons of professional hockey in the American Hockey League and ECHL from 2002–10. He was selected by the Toronto Maple Leafs in the 9th round (267th overall) of the 1999 NHL entry draft. He played for the University of Maine Black Bears in college.

Peter Metcalf is a Certified Financial Planner and founded MetCap Wealth Management in June of 2024 located in South Portland, Maine.

== Awards and honors ==
Award	Year
All-Hockey East Rookie Team	1998–99
All-Hockey East First Team	2001–02
AHCA East Second-Team All-American	2001–02
Hockey East All-Tournament Team	2002
All-NCAA All-Tournament Team	2002
ECHL First All-Star Team	2006–07
ECHL First All-Star Team	2007–08
