= 1998–99 NCAA Division I men's ice hockey rankings =

- NCAA tournament: 1999
- NCAA champion: Maine
- Preseason No. 1 (USCHO): Boston College
- NCAA Division I men's ice hockey rankings

Two human polls made up the 1998–99 NCAA Division I men's ice hockey rankings, the USCHO.com/CBS College Sports poll and the USA Today/American Hockey Magazine Coaches Poll. As the 1998–99 season progressed, rankings were updated weekly. There were a total of 10 voters in the USA Today poll and 30 voters in the USCHO.com poll. Each first place vote is worth 10 points in the rankings with every subsequent vote worth 1 point less.

== Legend ==
	Increase in ranking
	Decrease in ranking
	Not ranked previous week
(Italics)	Number of first place votes
#–#–#	Win–loss–tie record
†	Tied with team above or below also with this symbol

== USA Today/American Hockey Magazine Coaches Poll ==
	Week 3 Nov 2	Week 4 Nov 9	Week 5 Nov 16	Week 6 Nov 23	Week 7 Nov 30	Week 8 Dec 7	Week 9 Dec 14	Week 10 Dec 31	Week 12 Jan 11	Week 13 Jan 18	Week 14 Jan 25	Week 15 Feb 1	Week 16 Feb 8	Week 17 Feb 15	Week 18 Feb 22	Week 21 Mar 15	Week 22 Mar 22	Final Apr 5	
1	Boston College (8) 4-0-0	Boston College (5) 4–0–1	North Dakota (10) 5–0–1	North Dakota (7) 6–1–1	North Dakota (8) 8–1–1	North Dakota (10) 10–1–1	North Dakota (10) 12–1–1	North Dakota (10) 12–1–1	North Dakota (9) 15–2–1	North Dakota (10) 17–2–1	North Dakota (10) 19–2–1	North Dakota (10) 20–2–2	North Dakota (10) 22–2–2	North Dakota (10) 24–2–2	North Dakota (10) 26–2–2	North Dakota (6) 31–4–2	North Dakota (6) 32–5–2	Maine (10) 31–6–4	1
2	North Dakota (2) 2-0-0	North Dakota (4) 5–0–0	Boston College; 5–1–1	Colorado College (1) 8–1–0	Colorado College (2) 10–2–0	Michigan; 11–2–2	Colorado College; 13–3–0	Maine; 11–1–3	Maine; 14–2–4	Maine; 16–2–4	Maine; 18–2–4	Maine; 19–2–4	Maine; 21–2–4	Maine; 22–2–4	Michigan State; 24–3–6	New Hampshire (3) 28–5–3	New Hampshire (4) 29–6–3	New Hampshire; 31–7–3	2
3	Colorado College; 5-0-0	Colorado College (1) 7–0–0	Colorado College; 7–1–0	Michigan (2) 8–2–0	Maine; 9–1–1	Maine; 9–1–1	Michigan; 13–2–2	Michigan; 13–3–2	Michigan State (1) 18–3–2	New Hampshire; 17–4–1	New Hampshire; 19–4–1	New Hampshire; 21–4–1	Michigan State; 21–3–6	Michigan State; 22–3–6	Maine; 23–3–4	Michigan State (1) 28–4–7	Michigan State; 28–5–7	Michigan State; 29–6–7	3
4	Maine; 3-0-0	Maine; 5–0–0	Notre Dame; 8–1–2	Boston College; 6–2–1	Michigan; 9–2–2	Colorado College; 11–3–0	Maine; 10–1–2	Boston College; 10–5–1	New Hampshire; 15–4–1	Michigan State; 19–3–3	Michigan State; 20–3–4	Michigan State; 20–3–5	New Hampshire; 21–5–1	New Hampshire; 22–5–2	New Hampshire; 23–5–3	Maine; 27–5–4	Maine; 27–6–4	Boston College; 27–12–4	4
5	Michigan State; 3-0-2	Michigan State; 5–0–2	Michigan State; 6–1–2	Maine; 7–1–1	Boston College; 6–2–1	Boston College; 8–4–1	New Hampshire; 11–3–1	Colorado College; 14–4–0	Michigan †; 15–4–2	Michigan; 16–5–2	Michigan; 17–5–3	Colorado College; 17–8–1	Colorado College; 19–8–1	Colorado College; 20–9–1	Colorado College; 21–10–1	Colorado College; 27–10–1	Boston College; 25–11–4	North Dakota; 32–6–2	5
6	Northern Michigan; 7-1-0	Notre Dame; 7–1–1	Maine; 5–1–1	New Hampshire; 7–1–1	New Hampshire; 8–2–1	Michigan State; 10–3–2	Boston College; 8–4–1	Michigan State; 13–3–2	Boston College †; 12–6–2	Boston College; 13–7–2	Colorado College; 17–8–1	Princeton; 13–4–1	Notre Dame; 16–6–4	Boston College; 18–10–2	Boston College; 19–10–3	Clarkson; 23–10–1	Clarkson; 25–10–1	Colorado College; 29–12–1	6
7	Notre Dame; 6-1-0	Michigan; 5–2–0	New Hampshire; 6–1–1	Michigan State; 7–2–2	Notre Dame; 9–3–2	New Hampshire; 9–3–1	Michigan State; 11–3–2	New Hampshire; 12–3–1	Colorado College; 15–6–1	Colorado College; 15–8–1	Princeton; 11–4–1	Michigan; 17–6–4	Boston College; 17–9–2	Notre Dame; 16–8–4	Clarkson; 18–9–1	Boston College; 23–11–4	Michigan; 24–10–6	Michigan; 25–11–6	7
8	New Hampshire; 4-0-0	New Hampshire; 5–1–0	Michigan; 6–2–1	Notre Dame; 9–2–2	Michigan State; 8–3–2	Ferris State †; 9–3–3	Princeton; 7–1–1	Princeton; 9–2–1	Princeton; 11–4–1	Princeton; 11–4–1	Boston College; 14–8–2	Boston College; 16–8–2	Michigan; 17–8–4	Michigan; 17–8–5	Michigan; 17–9–6	Michigan; 22–10–6	Colorado College; 28–11–1	Denver; 26–13–2	8
9	Michigan; 5-2-0	Northern Michigan; 8–2–0	Northern Michigan; 9–3–0	Denver; 7–3–0	Ferris State; 9–3–2	Princeton †; 7–1–1	Notre Dame; 9–4–2	Colgate; 10–4–1	Notre Dame; 12–6–2	Notre Dame; 14–6–2	Rensselaer; 15–5–1	Notre Dame; 15–6–3	Denver; 15–9–2	Clarkson; 16–5–1	St. Lawrence; 18–9–3	Denver; 24–12–2	Denver; 26–12–2	Clarkson; 25–11–1	9
10	St. Lawrence; 4-1-0	Denver; 6–1–0	Denver; 6–2–0	Colgate; 5–2–0	Denver; 7–3–0	Notre Dame; 9–4–2	Colgate; 9–3–0	Notre Dame; 9–5–2	Colgate; 11–5–1	Rensselaer; 13–5–1	Notre Dame; 14–7–3	Denver; 15–9–2	Ohio State; 17–9–4	Ohio State; 18–11–4	Ohio State; 19–12–4	St. Lawrence; 22–11–3	St. Lawrence; 23–12–3	St. Lawrence; 23–13–3	10
	Week 1 Nov 2	Week 2 Nov 9	Week 3 Nov 16	Week 4 Nov 23	Week 5 Nov 30	Week 6 Dec 7	Week 7 Dec 14	Week 8 Dec 31	Week 9 Jan 11	Week 10 Jan 18	Week 11 Jan 25	Week 12 Feb 1	Week 13 Feb 8	Week 14 Feb 15	Week 15 Feb 22	Week 16 Mar 15	Week 17 Mar 22	Final APR 5	
		Dropped: St. Lawrence; 4–1–0	Dropped: None	Dropped: Northern Michigan; 9–5–0	Dropped: Colgate; 6–2–0	Dropped: Denver; 7–5–0	Dropped: Ferris State; 9–5–3	Dropped: None	Dropped: None	Dropped: Colgate; 11–5–2	Dropped: None	Dropped: Rensselaer; 15–7–1	Dropped: Princeton; 13–6–1	Dropped: Denver; 15–11–2	Dropped: Notre Dame; 16–10–4	Dropped: Ohio State; 21–14–4	Dropped: None	Dropped: None	

== USCHO.com/CBS College Sports ==
	Preseason Oct 5	Week 1 Oct 19	Week 2 Oct 26	Week 3 Nov 2	Week 4 Nov 9	Week 5 Nov 16	Week 6 Nov 23	Week 7 Nov 30	Week 8 Dec 7	Week 9 Dec 14	Week 11 Jan 4	Week 12 Jan 11	Week 13 Jan 18	Week 14 Jan 25	Week 15 Feb 1	Week 16 Feb 8	Week 17 Feb 15	Week 18 Feb 22	Week 19 Mar 1	Week 20 Mar 8	Final Mar 22	
1	Boston College (6)	Boston College (24) 2–0–0	Boston College (21) 2–0–0	Boston College (23) 4–0–0	North Dakota (16) 4–0–0	North Dakota (29) 5–0–1	North Dakota (22) 6–1–1	North Dakota (25) 8–1–1	North Dakota (30) 10–1–1	North Dakota (30) 12–1–1	North Dakota (27) 13–2–1	North Dakota (28) 15–2–1	North Dakota (30) 17–2–1	North Dakota (29) 19–2–1	North Dakota (27) 20–2–2	North Dakota (27) 22–2–2	North Dakota (29) 24–2–2	North Dakota (29) 26–2–2	North Dakota (26) 27–3–2	North Dakota (30) 29–3–2	North Dakota (28) 32–5–2	1
2	Michigan (11)	North Dakota (6) 0–0–0	North Dakota (7) 0–0–0	North Dakota (7) 2–0–0	Boston College (9) 4–0–1	Boston College (1) 5–1–1	Colorado College (7) 8–2–0	Colorado College (5) 10–2–0	Colorado College; 11–3–0	Colorado College; 13–3–0	Maine (2) 12–1–4	Michigan State (2) 18–3–2	Maine; 16–2–4	Maine; 18–2–4	Maine (3) 19–2–4	Maine (3) 21–2–4	Maine (1) 22–2–4	Michigan State (1) 24–3–6	Michigan State (3) 25–3–7	New Hampshire; 26–5–3	New Hampshire; 29–6–3	2
3	North Dakota (10)	Maine; 2–0–0	Maine; 3–0–0	Colorado College; 4–0–0	Colorado College (5) 6–0–0	Colorado College; 7–1–0	Boston College; 6–2–1	Maine; 9–1–1	Maine; 9–1–1	Michigan; 12–2–2	Michigan State (1) 16–3–2	Maine; 14–2–4	Michigan State; 19–3–3	Michigan State (1) 20–3–4	New Hampshire; 21–4–1	Michigan State; 21–3–6	Michigan State; 22–3–6	Maine; 23–3–4	Maine (1) 25–3–4	Michigan State; 26–4–7	Michigan State; 28–5–7	3
4	Ohio State (2)	Colorado College; 0–0–0	Colorado College; 2–0–0	Maine; 3–0–0	Maine; 5–0–0	Notre Dame; 8–1–2	Michigan (1) 8–2–1	Michigan; 9–2–2	Michigan; 11–2–2	Maine; 10–1–2	New Hampshire; 13–4–1	New Hampshire; 15–4–1	New Hampshire; 17–4–1	New Hampshire; 19–4–1	Michigan State; 20–3–5	New Hampshire; 21–5–1	New Hampshire; 22–5–2	New Hampshire; 23–5–3	New Hampshire; 24–5–3	Maine; 25–5–4	Maine; 27–6–4	4
5	Michigan State	Michigan State; 1–0–1	Michigan State; 2–0–2	Michigan State; 3–0–2	Michigan State; 5–0–2	Michigan State; 6–1–2	Notre Dame; 9–2–2	Boston College; 7–3–1	New Hampshire; 9–3–1	New Hampshire; 11–3–1	Colorado College; 14–5–1	Michigan; 15–4–2	Michigan; 16–5–2	Michigan; 17–5–3	Colorado College; 17–8–1	Colorado College; 19–8–1	Colorado College; 20–9–1	Colorado College; 21–10–1	Colorado College; 23–10–1	Colorado College; 25–10–1	Boston College; 25–11–4	5
6	Colorado College (1)	Michigan; 2–1–0	Michigan; 4–1–0	Northern Michigan; 7–1–0	Notre Dame; 7–1–1	New Hampshire; 6–1–1	Maine; 7–1–1	Notre Dame; 9–3–2	Boston College; 8–4–1	Michigan State; 11–3–2	Boston College; 11–5–2	Boston College; 12–6–2	Boston College; 13–7–2	Colorado College; 17–8–1	Michigan; 17–6–4	Boston College; 17–9–2	Boston College; 18–10–2	Boston College; 19–10–3	Clarkson; 20–9–1	Clarkson; 21–10–1	Clarkson; 25–10–1	6
7	Clarkson	Clarkson; 0–0–0	Northern Michigan (2) 6–0–0	New Hampshire; 4–0–0	Northern Michigan; 8–2–0	Maine; 5–1–1	New Hampshire; 7–1–1	New Hampshire; 8–2–1	Michigan State; 10–3–2	Boston College; 9–4–1	Michigan; 13–4–2	Colorado College; 15–6–1	Colorado College; 15–8–1	Boston College; 14–8–2	Boston College; 16–8–2	Notre Dame; 16–7–4	Michigan; 17–8–5	Clarkson; 18–9–1	Boston College; 19–11–4	Boston College; 21–11–4	Colorado College; 28–11–1	7
8	Maine	Notre Dame; 5–0–0	New Hampshire; 3–0–0	Notre Dame; 6–1–0	New Hampshire; 5–1–0	Michigan; 6–2–1	Michigan State; 7–2–2	Michigan State; 8–3–2	Princeton; 7–1–1	Princeton; 7–1–1	Princeton; 10–3–1	Notre Dame; 12–6–2	Notre Dame; 14–6–2	Rensselaer; 15–5–1	Princeton; 14–4–1	Michigan; 17–8–4	Notre Dame; 16–9–4	Michigan; 17–9–6	Michigan; 19–9–6	Michigan; 20–10–6	Denver; 26–12–2	8
9	Boston University	New Hampshire†; 1–0–0	Notre Dame; 6–1–0	Michigan; 5–2–0	Michigan; 5–2–0	Northern Michigan; 9–3–0	Denver; 7–3–0	Ferris State; 9–3–2	Ferris State; 9–3–3	Notre Dame; 9–5–2	Notre Dame; 10–6–2	Princeton; 11–4–1	Princeton; 11–4–1	Princeton; 11–4–1	Notre Dame; 15–7–3	Ohio State; 17–10–4	Ohio State; 18–11–4	St. Lawrence; 18–9–3	Ohio State; 19–12–4	Denver; 22–12–2	Michigan; 24–10–6	9
10	Wisconsin	Ohio State†; 1–3–0	St. Lawrence; 3–1–0	St. Lawrence; 4–1–0	St. Lawrence; 4–1–0	Denver; 6–2–0	St. Lawrence; 6–2–0	Denver; 7–3–0	Notre Dame; 9–5–2	St. Lawrence; 9–4–0	Ohio State; 10–8–2	Rensselaer; 12–5–1	Rensselaer; 13–5–1	Notre Dame; 14–7–3	Denver; 15–9–2	Denver; 17–9–2	Clarkson; 16–9–1	Ohio State; 19–12–4	Denver; 20–12–2	St. Lawrence; 20–11–3	St. Lawrence; 23–12–3	10
	Preseason Oct 5	Week 1 Oct 19	Week 2 Oct 26	Week 3 Nov 2	Week 4 Nov 9	Week 5 Nov 16	Week 6 Nov 23	Week 7 Nov 30	Week 8 Dec 7	Week 9 Dec 14	Week 10 Jan 4	Week 11 Jan 11	Week 12 Jan 18	Week 13 Jan 25	Week 14 Feb 1	Week 15 Feb 8	Week 16 Feb 15	Week 17 Feb 22	Week 18 Mar 1	Week 19 Mar 8	Week 20 Mar 22	
		Dropped: Wisconsin; 1–2–0; Boston University; 0–1–0	Dropped: Clarkson; 0–2–0; Ohio State; 1–4–1	Dropped: None	Dropped: None	Dropped: St. Lawrence; 5–2–0	Dropped: Northern Michigan; 9–5–0	Dropped: St. Lawrence; 7–4–0	Dropped: Denver; 7–5–0	Dropped: Ferris State; 9–5–2	Dropped: St. Lawrence; 10–6–1	Dropped: Ohio State; 11–9–2	Dropped: None	Dropped: None	Dropped: Rensselaer; 15–7–1	Dropped: Princeton; 14–6–1	Dropped: Denver; 17–11–2	Dropped: Notre Dame; 16–11–4	Dropped: St. Lawrence; 19–10–4	Dropped: Ohio State; 19–14–4	Dropped: None	
