= 2001–02 Minnesota Golden Gophers men's ice hockey season =

NCAA Division I National Champion Mariucci Classic, champion NCAA Tournament, champion
- Conference: 3rd WCHA
- Home ice: Mariucci Arena

Rankings
- USCHO: 3
- USA Today: 1

Record
- Overall: 32–8–4
- Conference: 18–7–3
- Home: 18–4–0
- Road: 10–3–4
- Neutral: 4–1–0

Coaches and captains
- Head coach: Don Lucia
- Assistant coaches: Mike Guentzel; Bob Motzko; Robb Stauber
- Captain(s): Jordan Leopold; John Pohl
- Alternate captain: Grant Potulny

The 2001–02 Minnesota Golden Gophers men's ice hockey season was the 81st season of play for the program. They represent the University of Minnesota in the 2001–02 NCAA Division I men's ice hockey season and for the 43rd season in Western Collegiate Hockey Association (WCHA). The Golden Gophers were coached by Don Lucia, in his 3rd season, and played their home games at the Mariucci Arena.

== Season ==
=== Fast start ===
Minnesota entered the season with the highest expectations since the mid-90s, being ranked in the top-5 in both preseason polls. The team lived up to its billing and then some from the start when they downed defending finalist and #2 North Dakota and then went on a long unbeaten streak. In the game starting goaltender Adam Hauser faltered in the first and was replaced by freshman Travis Weber. Houser regained the starting role after a strong performance the following week and cemented his position when he relieved Weber after the young netminder allowed 4 goals in the first period against Michigan Tech. While the goalies were sorting themselves out, the Golden Gophers' offense was overpowering in their first 13 games. Minnesota scored no fewer than 4 goals a night and averaging 6 goals a game. The scoring was led by Jeff Taffe and Jordan Leopold but was spread across the lineup with all four lines contributing to the team's success.

=== Hiccup ===
Minnesota rode its stellar record to the #1 seed and held it until early December. The offense cooled off a bit against St. Cloud State and the Gophers lost their top ranking as a result. The team split a road series at Denver to head into then holiday break but recovered a bit by winning the Mariucci Classic. Despite winning the tournament, Minnesota dropped another spot in the rankings and slowly slipped down to #5 by failing to sweep any of the succeeding 5 weekends. During this time, the team began rotating the starting job in goal between Hauser and Weber with mixed results.

=== Returning to form ===
The Gopher offense finally regained its footing in early February and remained consistent for most of the rest of the season. The result was Minnesota going 7–1 down the stretch to finish strong. Unfortunately, the mid-season stumble cost the team a chance at a regular season title and the Golden Gophers finished 3rd in the WCHA. In the final month of the season, Hauser regain the starting role with a string of solid performances and led the team into the postseason as the #3 team.

=== WCHA Tournament ===
In spite of a scare in the second game against North Dakota, Minnesota continued their hot streak. They overpowered St. Cloud State in the semifinal to reach their first championship game since 1997. While the Gophers outshout Denver 40–27, they were stymied by a masterful performance by Wade Dubielewicz and fell 2–5.

=== NCAA tournament ===
Though disappointed at the runner-up finish, Minnesota did receive the second western seed for the NCAA Tournament and were advanced into the second round. Their first game came against conference-rival Colorado College. The Tigers got on the board first, but the Gophers got the next three goals. CC closed the gap just after the mid-point of the game but the defense closed ranks and limited the opportunities on their goal for the remainder of the match. Early in the 3rd, Barry Tallackson took a hooking call, giving Colorado College a man-advantage, but it was Minnesota's John Pohl who scored during the ensuing power play. Several more penalties were called before the end of the match, but a pair of cross-checking infractions from Alex Kim put CC at a disadvantage for most of the final four minutes and helped usher the Gophers to their first postseason victory in 5 years.

The national semifinal against Michigan wasn't any more sedate and Minnesota had to kill off six separate penalties during the game. They managed to do so and progressively built a 3–0 lead early in the third. The Wolverines would not quit, however, and scored twice to pull within a goal with 90 seconds remaining. With Minnesota playing a defensive shell, they managed to hold off Michigan and still had the lead when the buzzer sounded.

==== National championship ====
In Minnesota's first championship appearance in over a decade, they met Maine and the two fought a back-and-forth battle for the title. Minnesota got on the board in the first period on the strength of the power play goal from Keith Ballard. They held the lead for a time but couldn't extend their advantage despite three succeeding penalties by Maine. Instead, it was the Black bears who netted a power play marker early in the second frame. John Pohl wasted no time and scored to give Minnesota the lead just 51 seconds later. The Gophers continued to hold a 1-goal advantage for the rest of the period on the strength of Hauser's play. Maine tied the game a second time, just 77 seconds into the third, and continued to fire the puck on goal until they got their first lead of the game with under 5 minutes to play. Minnesota tried to tie the game for a fourth time but the clock was quickly counting down. After an icing, head coach Don Lucia called a timeout with 58 seconds remaining and drew up a play for the team. The ensuing drew turned to a melee but the puck found its way to Matt Koalska, who shot it between Matthew Yeats' legs to the delight of the partisan crowd. Both teams had several opportunities to score in the ensuing overtime, but Minnesota got the biggest break when Maine took a tripping penalty with just over 4 minutes remaining. A minute later, Grant Potulny collected the second rebound after shots by Leopold and Pohl and fired the puck into the cage, winning the 4th national title for the program.

This was the 4th national championship team consisted entirely of American players (1949 Boston College, 1976 Minnesota, 1979 Minnesota).

== Departures ==
Player	Position	Nationality	Cause
Matt Leimbek	Forward	United States	Graduation (retired)
Dylan Mills	Defenseman	United States	Graduation (signed with Quad City Mallards)
Aaron Miskovich	Forward	United States	Graduation (signed with Hershey Bears)
Pete Samargia	Goaltender	United States	Transferred to Augsburg
Stuart Senden	Forward	United States	Graduation (retired)
Ben Tharp	Defenseman	United States	Returned to juniors (Chicago Steel)
Erik Westrum	Forward	United States	Graduation (signed with Phoenix Coyotes)
Erik Young	Goaltender	United States	Returned to juniors (Tri-City Storm)

== Recruiting ==
Player	Position	Nationality	Age	Notes
Dan Welch	Forward	United States	20	Hastings, MN; joined mid-season; returned from juniors
Keith Ballard	Defenseman	United States	18	Baudette, MN
Mike Erickson	Forward	United States	18	Elk River, MN
Jake Fleming	Forward	United States	19	Osseo, MN
Justin Johnson	Goaltender	United States	21	Ham Lake, MN
Brett MacKinnon	Forward	United States	20	Wayzata, MN
Jerrid Reinholz	Forward	United States	22	Ramsey, MN; transfer from Minnesota–Duluth; redshirt
Garrett Smaagaard	Forward	United States	19	Eden Prairie, MN
Judd Stevens	Defenseman	United States	18	Wayzata, MN
Barry Tallackson	Forward	United States	18	Grafton, ND
Travis Weber	Goaltender	United States	18	Hibbing, MN

== Roster ==
No.	Nat.	Player	Class	Pos	Height	Weight	DoB	Hometown	Previous team	NHL rights
1		Adam Hauser	Senior	G	6' 2" (1.88 m)	194 lb (88 kg)	1980-05-27	Bovey, Minnesota	USNTDP (USHL)	EDM, 81st overall 1999
2		Mark Nenovich	Senior	D	6' 1" (1.85 m)	192 lb (87 kg)	1979-07-15	Plymouth, Minnesota		—
3		Jordan Leopold (C)	Senior	D	6' 1" (1.85 m)	206 lb (93 kg)	1980-08-03	Golden Valley, Minnesota	USNTDP (USHL)	ANA, 44th overall 1999
5		Jon Waibel	Sophomore	F	5' 11" (1.8 m)	190 lb (86 kg)	1982-05-19	Baudette, Minnesota	USNTDP (USHL)	ANA, 153rd overall 2000
6		Judd Stevens	Freshman	D	6' 2" (1.88 m)	203 lb (92 kg)	1983-04-09	Wayzata, Minnesota	Green Bay Gamblers (USHL)	—
9		John Pohl (C)	Senior	F	6' 1" (1.85 m)	196 lb (89 kg)	1979-06-26	Rochester, Minnesota	Twin City Vulcans (USHL)	STL, 255th overall 1998
10		Paul Martin	Sophomore	D	6' 1" (1.85 m)	200 lb (91 kg)	1981-06-20	Minneapolis, Minnesota	Elk River High School (MN-HS)	NJD, 62nd overall 2000
11		Erik Wendell	Senior	F	6' 1" (1.85 m)	196 lb (89 kg)	1979-08-23	Maple Grove, Minnesota	Twin City Vulcans (USHL)	WSH, 125th overall 1998
13		Keith Ballard	Freshman	D	5' 11" (1.8 m)	199 lb (90 kg)	1982-11-26	Baudette, Minnesota	Omaha Lancers (USHL)	—
14		Chad Roberg	Sophomore	F	5' 11" (1.8 m)	174 lb (79 kg)	1980-10-25	Duluth, Minnesota	East High School (MN-HS)	—
15		Mike Erickson	Freshman	F	6' 3" (1.91 m)	200 lb (91 kg)	1983-04-12	Elk River, Minnesota	Des Moines Buccaneers (USHL)	—
16		Nick Anthony	Junior	F	5' 0" (1.52 m)	181 lb (82 kg)	1979-01-30	Faribault, Minnesota	Twin City Vulcans (USHL)	—
17		Garrett Smaagaard	Freshman	F	5' 11" (1.8 m)	188 lb (85 kg)	1982-08-13	Eden Prairie, Minnesota	Eden Prairie High School (MN-HS)	—
18		Grant Potulny (A)	Sophomore	F	6' 3" (1.91 m)	204 lb (93 kg)	1980-03-04	Grand Forks, North Dakota	Lincoln Stars (USHL)	OTT, 157th overall 2000
19		Matt DeMarchi	Junior	D	6' 2" (1.88 m)	205 lb (93 kg)	1981-05-04	Bemidji, Minnesota	North Iowa Huskies (USHL)	NJD, 57th overall 2000
20		Joey Martin	Sophomore	D	6' 3" (1.91 m)	203 lb (92 kg)	1981-07-17	Buffalo, Minnesota	Omaha Lancers (USHL)	CHI, 193rd overall 2000
21		Troy Riddle	Sophomore	F	5' 10" (1.78 m)	175 lb (79 kg)	1981-08-24	Minneapolis, Minnesota	Des Moines Buccaneers (USHL)	STL, 129th overall 2000
22		Jeff Taffe	Junior	F	6' 3" (1.91 m)	215 lb (98 kg)	1981-02-19	Hastings, Minnesota	Rochester Mustangs (USHL)	STL, 30th overall 2000
23		Dan Welch	Sophomore	F	5' 11" (1.8 m)	181 lb (82 kg)	1981-02-23	Hastings, Minnesota	Omaha Lancers (USHL)	LAK, 193rd overall 2000
24		Matt Koalska	Sophomore	F	6' 0" (1.83 m)	205 lb (93 kg)	1980-05-16	Saint Paul, Minnesota	Twin City Vulcans (USHL)	NSH, 154th overall 2000
25		Pat O'Leary	Senior	F	6' 2" (1.88 m)	200 lb (91 kg)	1979-09-02	Plymouth, Minnesota		PHO, 73rd overall 1998
26		Nick Angell	Senior	D	6' 0" (1.83 m)	220 lb (100 kg)	1979-10-31	Duluth, Minnesota	East High School (MN-HS)	—
27		Barry Tallackson	Freshman	F	6' 5" (1.96 m)	210 lb (95 kg)	1983-04-14	Grafton, North Dakota	USNTDP (USHL)	—
28		Brett MacKinnon	Freshman	F	5' 11" (1.8 m)	190 lb (86 kg)	1981-01-02	Wayzata, Minnesota	Cedar Rapids RoughRiders (USHL)	—
29		Jake Fleming	Freshman	F	5' 9" (1.75 m)	166 lb (75 kg)	1982-08-28	Osseo, Minnesota	Omaha Lancers (USHL)	—
31		Travis Weber	Freshman	G	5' 11" (1.8 m)	205 lb (93 kg)	1983-05-26	Hibbing, Minnesota	USNTDP (USHL)	—
33		Justin Johnson	Freshman	G	5' 10" (1.78 m)	183 lb (83 kg)	1980-09-22	Ham Lake, Minnesota	Lincoln Stars (USHL)	—

== Standings ==
2001–02 Western Collegiate Hockey Association standings
	Conference							Overall					
	GP	W	L	T	PTS	GF	GA	GP	W	L	T	GF	GA
#5 Denver†*	28	21	6	1	43	108	63	41	32	8	1	158	86
#10 St. Cloud State	28	19	7	2	40	117	65	42	29	11	2	179	99
#1 Minnesota	28	18	7	3	39	113	84	44	32	8	4	197	119
#7 Colorado College	28	16	10	2	34	95	74	43	27	13	3	147	97
Wisconsin	28	12	13	3	27	88	90	39	16	19	4	123	120
Minnesota State-Mankato	28	11	15	2	24	84	107	38	16	20	2	124	138
Alaska-Anchorage	28	10	14	4	24	79	96	36	12	19	5	99	125
North Dakota	28	11	15	2	24	103	100	37	16	19	2	134	136
Minnesota-Duluth	28	6	19	3	15	72	112	40	13	24	3	119	153
Michigan Tech	28	4	22	2	10	66	134	38	8	28	2	92	177
Championship: Denver † indicates conference regular season champion * indicates conference tournament champion Final rankings: USA Today/American Hockey Magazine Poll Top 15 Poll

== Schedule and results ==
Date	Time	Opponent^{#}	Rank^{#}	Site	TV	Decision	Result	Attendance	Record
Regular season
October 5	7:05 PM	at #2 North Dakota*	#4	Ralph Engelstad Arena • Grand Forks, North Dakota (US Hockey Hall of Fame Game)		Weber	W 7–5	11,690	1–0–0
October 19	7:05 PM	vs. Bemidji State*	#3	Mariucci Arena • Minneapolis, Minnesota		Weber	W 7–2	9,569	2–0–0
October 20	7:05 PM	vs. Bemidji State*	#3	Mariucci Arena • Minneapolis, Minnesota		Hauser	W 7–1	9,562	3–0–0
October 26	7:05 PM	vs. Colgate*	#2	Mariucci Arena • Minneapolis, Minnesota		Hauser	W 8–0	9,684	4–0–0
October 27	7:05 PM	vs. Colgate*	#2	Mariucci Arena • Minneapolis, Minnesota		Johnson	W 9–0	9,730	5–0–0
November 2	6:04 PM	at Michigan Tech	#1	MacInnes Student Ice Arena • Houghton, Michigan		Hauser	W 7–3	2,555	6–0–0 (1–0–0)
November 3	7:04 PM	at Michigan Tech	#1	MacInnes Student Ice Arena • Houghton, Michigan		Hauser	T 5–5 ^{OT}	2,545	6–0–1 (1–0–1)
November 9	7:05 PM	vs. Minnesota State–Mankato	#2	Mariucci Arena • Minneapolis, Minnesota		Hauser	W 5–3	9,804	7–0–1 (2–0–1)
November 10	7:05 PM	vs. Minnesota State–Mankato	#2	Mariucci Arena • Minneapolis, Minnesota		Johnson	W 4–2	9,871	8–0–1 (3–0–1)
November 16	7:05 PM	vs. Minnesota–Duluth	#1	Mariucci Arena • Minneapolis, Minnesota		Hauser	W 5–1	9,899	9–0–1 (4–0–1)
November 17	8:05 PM	vs. Minnesota–Duluth	#1	Mariucci Arena • Minneapolis, Minnesota		Hauser	W 5–3	9,917	10–0–1 (5–0–1)
College Hockey Showcase
November 23	6:35 PM	at #11 Michigan*	#1	Yost Ice Arena • Ann Arbor, Michigan (College Hockey Showcase game 1)		Hauser	W 5–2	6,917	11–0–1
November 25	12:34 PM	at #4 Michigan State*	#1	Munn Ice Arena • East Lansing, Michigan (College Hockey Showcase game 2)		Hauser	T 4–4 ^{OT}	6,871	11–0–2
November 30	7:05 PM	vs. #2 St. Cloud State	#1	Mariucci Arena • Minneapolis, Minnesota		Hauser	L 2–3	10,231	11–1–2 (5–1–1)
December 1	7:08 PM	at #2 St. Cloud State	#1	National Hockey Center • St. Cloud, Minnesota		Hauser	T 2–2 ^{OT}	6,685	11–1–3 (5–1–2)
December 7	8:35 PM	at #3 Denver	#2	Magness Arena • Denver, Colorado		Hauser	W 2–1	6,013	12–1–3 (6–1–2)
December 8	8:05 PM	at #3 Denver	#2	Magness Arena • Denver, Colorado		Hauser	L 3–4	6,013	12–2–3 (6–2–2)
Mariucci Classic
December 28	7:05 PM	vs. Ferris State*	#2	Mariucci Arena • Minneapolis, Minnesota (Mariucci semifinal)		Hauser	W 3–2	10,040	13–2–3
December 30	7:05 PM	vs. Providence*	#3	Mariucci Arena • Minneapolis, Minnesota (Mariucci championship)		Weber	W 6–1	10,074	14–2–3
January 6	7:05 PM	vs. North Dakota	#3	Mariucci Arena • Minneapolis, Minnesota		Hauser	L 3–4	10,214	14–3–3 (6–3–2)
January 7	7:05 PM	vs. North Dakota	#3	Mariucci Arena • Minneapolis, Minnesota		Weber	W 2–1	10,183	15–3–3 (7–3–2)
January 11	7:08 PM	at Wisconsin	#4	Kohl Center • Madison, Wisconsin		Weber	L 3–8	12,937	15–4–3 (7–4–2)
January 12	7:08 PM	at Wisconsin	#4	Kohl Center • Madison, Wisconsin		Hauser	W 6–2	14,711	16–4–3 (8–4–2)
January 18	10:08 PM	at Alaska–Anchorage	#5	Sullivan Arena • Anchorage, Alaska		Hauser	T 3–3 ^{OT}	4,658	16–4–4 (8–4–3)
January 19	10:05 PM	at Alaska–Anchorage	#5	Sullivan Arena • Anchorage, Alaska		Weber	W 5–2	5,230	17–4–4 (9–4–3)
January 25	7:05 PM	vs. #1 Denver	#4	Mariucci Arena • Minneapolis, Minnesota		Hauser	L 1–3	10,176	17–5–4 (9–5–3)
January 26	7:05 PM	vs. #1 Denver	#4	Mariucci Arena • Minneapolis, Minnesota		Weber	W 6–1	10,217	18–5–4 (10–5–3)
January 28	7:05 PM	vs. France*	#3	Mariucci Arena • Minneapolis, Minnesota			W 6–2		
February 1	7:05 PM	at Minnesota–Duluth	#3	Duluth Entertainment Convention Center • Duluth, Minnesota		Weber	L 2–5	5,405	18–6–4 (10–6–3)
February 2	7:05 PM	at Minnesota–Duluth	#3	Duluth Entertainment Convention Center • Duluth, Minnesota		Hauser	W 2–1	5,405	19–6–4 (11–6–3)
February 8	7:35 PM	at North Dakota	#5	Ralph Engelstad Arena • Grand Forks, North Dakota		Johnson	W 6–4	11,815	20–6–4 (12–6–3)
February 9	7:35 PM	at North Dakota	#5	Ralph Engelstad Arena • Grand Forks, North Dakota		Hauser	W 4–3	12,189	21–6–4 (13–6–3)
February 15	7:05 PM	vs. #6 Colorado College	#4	Mariucci Arena • Minneapolis, Minnesota		Weber	L 5–6	10,219	21–7–4 (13–7–3)
February 16	7:05 PM	vs. #6 Colorado College	#4	Mariucci Arena • Minneapolis, Minnesota		Hauser	W 7–3	10,221	22–7–4 (14–7–3)
February 22	7:05 PM	vs. Wisconsin	#4	Mariucci Arena • Minneapolis, Minnesota		Hauser	W 6–3	10,192	23–7–4 (15–7–3)
February 23	7:05 PM	vs. Wisconsin	#4	Mariucci Arena • Minneapolis, Minnesota		Hauser	W 4–3 ^{OT}	10,228	24–7–4 (16–7–3)
March 1	7:13 PM	at #2 St. Cloud State	#4	National Hockey Center • St. Cloud, Minnesota		Hauser	W 5–4	6,685	25–7–4 (17–7–3)
March 2	7:05 PM	vs. #2 St. Cloud State	#4	Mariucci Arena • Minneapolis, Minnesota		Hauser	W 3–1	10,248	26–7–4 (18–7–3)
WCHA Tournament
March 8	7:05 PM	vs. North Dakota*	#3	Mariucci Arena • Minneapolis, Minnesota (WCHA first round game 1)		Hauser	W 7–2	10,203	27–7–4
March 9	7:05 PM	vs. North Dakota*	#3	Mariucci Arena • Minneapolis, Minnesota (WCHA first round game 2)		Hauser	W 4–3 ^{OT}	10,216	28–7–4
Minnesota Won Series 2-0
March 15	7:08 PM	vs. #4 St. Cloud State*	#3	Xcel Energy Center • Saint Paul, Minnesota (WCHA semifinal)		Hauser	W 4–1	18,523	29–7–4
March 17	7:00 PM	vs. #2 Denver*	#3	Xcel Energy Center • Saint Paul, Minnesota (WCHA championship)		Hauser	L 2–5	18,126	29–8–4
NCAA Tournament
March 23	3:06 PM	vs. #10 Colorado College*	#3	Yost Ice Arena • Ann Arbor, Michigan (NCAA West Regional semifinal)		Hauser	W 4–2	-	30–8–4
April 4	6:37 PM	vs. #7 Michigan*	#3	Xcel Energy Center • Saint Paul, Minnesota (NCAA National semifinal)		Hauser	W 3–2	19,234	31–8–4
April 6	6:07 PM	vs. #6 Maine*	#3	Xcel Energy Center • Saint Paul, Minnesota (NCAA National championship)	ESPN	Hauser	W 4–3 ^{OT}	19,324	32–8–4
*Non-conference game. ^{#}Rankings from USCHO.com Poll. All times are in Central Time.

== 2002 national championship ==
April 6	Minnesota	4 – 3	OT	Maine	Xcel Energy Center	Recap

Scoring summary
Period	Team	Goal	Assist(s)	Time	Score
1st	MIN	Keith Ballard (10) – PP	Riddle and Angell	7:18	1–0 MIN
2nd	Maine	Michael Schutte (12) – PP	Metcalf and Dimitrakos	24:47	1–1
2nd	MIN	John Pohl (27)	Anthony and Angell	25:38	2–1 MIN
3rd	Maine	Michael Schutte (13)	Ryan and Jackson	46:18	2–2
3rd	Maine	Róbert Liščák (17)	Dimitrakos	55:27	3–2 Maine
3rd	MIN	Matt Koalska (10) – EA	Riddle and Pohl	59:07	3–3
1st Overtime	MIN	Grant Potulny (15) – GW PP	Pohl and Leopold	76:58	4–3 MIN
Penalty summary
Period	Team	Player	Penalty	Time	PIM
1st	Maine	Cliff Loya	Holding	5:40	2:00
1st	Maine	Ben Murphy	Goaltender Interference	9:20	2:00
1st	Maine	Cliff Loya	Cross-Checking	10:08	2:00
1st	MIN	Grant Potulny	Holding the Stick	13:18	2:00
1st	Maine	Ben Murphy	High-Sticking	16:34	2:00
2nd	MIN	Grant Potulny	Interference	23:47	2:00
2nd	MIN	Keith Ballard	Obstruction Holding	29:37	2:00
2nd	Maine	Gray Shaneberger	Tripping	33:02	2:00
3rd	MIN	Jeff Taffe	Boarding	49:15	2:00
3rd	Maine	Lucas Lawson	Hitting after the Whistle	59:19	2:00
3rd	MIN	Matt DeMarchi	Hitting after the Whistle	59:19	2:00
1st Overtime	Maine	Michael Schutte	Tripping	75:58	2:00

Shots by period
Team	1	2	3	OT	T
Maine	11	13	16	5	45
Minnesota	11	8	9	7	35

Goaltenders
Team	Name	Saves	Goals against	Time on ice
Maine	Matthew Yeats	31	4	76:58
MIN	Adam Hauser	42	3	76:52

== Scoring statistics ==
Name	Position	Games	Goals	Assists	Points	PIM
John Pohl	C	44	27	52	79	26
Jeff Taffe	C	43	34	24	58	86
Jordan Leopold	D	44	20	28	48	28
Troy Riddle	C	44	16	31	47	46
Paul Martin	D	44	8	30	38	22
Grant Potulny	C	43	15	19	34	38
Matt Koalska	C	44	10	23	33	34
Barry Tallackson	RW	44	13	10	23	44
Keith Ballard	D	41	10	13	23	42
Nick Anthony	C	25	9	9	18	8
Erik Wendell	LW/RW	44	8	9	17	42
Judd Stevens	D	41	1	15	16	14
Nick Angell	D	44	4	11	15	61
Jake Fleming	F	43	3	9	12	6
Dan Welch	LW/RW	19	4	7	11	12
Matt DeMarchi	D	36	3	8	11	112
Jon Waibel	F	44	5	4	9	38
Pat O'Leary	C	40	4	2	6	18
Brett MacKinnon	F	20	1	3	4	0
Joey Martin	D	11	0	4	4	14
Mike Erickson	RW	9	1	2	3	2
Garrett Smaagaard	F	18	1	2	3	2
Adam Hauser	G	35	0	2	2	8
Mark Nenovich	D	5	0	1	1	4
Chad Roberg	F	2	0	0	0	0
Justin Johnson	G	6	0	0	0	0
Travis Weber	G	10	0	0	0	0
Bench	-	-	-	-	-	10
Total			197	318	515	717

== Goaltending statistics ==
Name	Games	Minutes	Wins	Losses	Ties	Goals against	Saves	Shut outs	SV %	GAA
Adam Hauser	35	2002	23	6	4	80	842	1	.913	2.40
Justin Johnson	6	233	3	0	0	12	99	1	.892	3.08
Travis Weber	10	456	6	2	0	25	167	0	.870	3.29
Empty Net	-	5	-	-	-	2	-	-	-	-
Total	44	2697	32	8	4	119	1108	2	.903	2.65

== Rankings ==
Poll	Week																									
Poll	Pre	1	2	3	4	5	6	7	8	9	10	11	12	13	14	15	16	17	18	19	20	21	22	23	24	25 (Final)
USCHO.com	4	N/A	3	2	1	2	1	1	1	2	2	2	3	4	5	4	3	5	4	4	4	3	3	3	N/A	N/A
USA Today	3	2	2	2	1	2	1	1	1	2	2	2	3	4	5	4	3	5	4	6	6	3	3	3	2	1

USCHO did not release a poll in weeks 1, 24 and 25.

== Awards and honors ==
Honor	Player	Ref
Grant Potulny	NCAA Tournament Most Outstanding Player	
Jordan Leopold	AHCA West Second Team All-American	
John Pohl	AHCA West Second Team All-American	
Adam Hauser	NCAA All-Tournament Team	
John Pohl	NCAA All-Tournament Team	
Grant Potulny	NCAA All-Tournament Team	
Jordan Leopold	WCHA Defensive Player of the Year	
Jordan Leopold	All-WCHA First Team	
John Pohl	All-WCHA First Team	
Paul Martin	All-WCHA Second Team	
Jeff Taffe	All-WCHA Third Team	
Keith Ballard	WCHA All-Rookie Team	
Troy Riddle	WCHA All-Tournament Team	
Jordan Leopold	WCHA All-Tournament Team	

== Players drafted into the NHL ==
=== 2002 NHL entry draft ===
= NHL All-Star team	= NHL All-Star	= NHL All-Star and NHL All-Star team	= Did not play in the NHL

Round	Pick	Player	NHL team
1	11	Keith Ballard	Buffalo Sabres
2	53	Barry Tallackson	New Jersey Devils
5	136	Andy Sertich ^{†}	Pittsburgh Penguins
6	170	P. J. Atherton ^{†}	Tampa Bay Lightning
6	177	Jake Taylor ^{†}	New York Rangers

† incoming freshman
