= 2001 NCAA Division I men's ice hockey tournament =

- 2001 Frozen Four logo
- Teams: 12
- Finals site: Pepsi Arena, Albany, New York
- Champions: Boston College Eagles (2nd title)
- Runner-up: North Dakota Fighting Sioux (11th title game)
- Semifinalists: Michigan Wolverines (20th Frozen Four); Michigan State Spartans (10th Frozen Four)
- Winning coach: Jerry York (2nd title)
- MOP: Chuck Kobasew (Boston College)
- Attendance: 77,122

The 2001 NCAA Division I men's ice hockey tournament involved 12 schools playing in single-elimination play to determine the national champion of men's NCAA Division I college ice hockey.

The final event was played at Pepsi Arena, Albany, New York. Boston College, coached by Jerry York, won its first national title since 1949 by defeating North Dakota, 3-2, in overtime on April 7 on a goal scored by sophomore forward Krys Kolanos just 4:43 into the extra session. The Eagles had advanced to the title game after a 4-2 victory over Michigan in one semifinal on April 5, while the national runners-up Fighting Sioux, coached by Dean Blais, shut out Michigan State, 2-0, in the other semifinal earlier that day.

BC, which finished the season with a record of 33-8-2, earned its first NCAA hockey crown in 52 years by besting the three schools that had eliminated it in the three previous Frozen Fours: Maine (1999); Michigan (1998) and; North Dakota (2000).

2001 was the first year in which the MAAC received an automatic bid into the NCAA tournament, with their representative being the Mercyhurst Lakers. Also, 2001 was the first year Frozen Four patches would debut and be worn by the final four teams.

== Game locations ==
2001 Regionals (blue) and Frozen Four (red)

The NCAA Men's Division I Ice Hockey Championship is a single-elimination tournament featuring 12 teams representing five Division I conferences in the nation. The Championship Committee seeds the entire field from 1 to 12 within two regionals of 6 teams. The winners of five Division I conference championships receive automatic bids to participate in the NCAA Championship. The top regional placements are given to the best teams from each of the two regions (East and West) while the remaining 10 teams are seeded based upon their rankings regardless of region.

=== Regional Sites ===
- East Regional – Centrum Centre, Worcester, Massachusetts
- West Regional – Van Andel Arena, Grand Rapids, Michigan

=== Championship Site ===
- Frozen Four – Pepsi Arena, Albany, New York

== Qualifying teams ==
The at-large bids and seeding for each team in the tournament were announced after the conference tournaments concluded on March 17, 2001. The Western Collegiate Hockey Association (WCHA) had five teams receive a berth in the tournament, Hockey East had three teams receive a berth in the tournament, Central Collegiate Hockey Association (CCHA) had two berths, while the ECAC and the Metro Atlantic Athletic Conference (MAAC) each received one entry into the tournament, with the latter making its first appearance in the NCAA championship.

West Regional – Grand Rapids							East Regional – Worcester						
Seed	School	Conference	Record	Berth type	Appearance	Last bid	Seed	School	Conference	Record	Berth type	Appearance	Last bid
1	Michigan State	CCHA	32–4–4	Tournament champion	21st	2000	1	Boston College	Hockey East	30–8–2	Tournament champion	22nd	2000
2	St. Cloud State	WCHA	31–8–1	Tournament champion	3rd	2000	2	North Dakota	WCHA	27–7–9	At-large bid	17th	2000
3	Michigan	CCHA	25–12–5	At-large bid	24th	2000	3	Colorado College	WCHA	26–12–1	At-large bid	14th	1999
4	Wisconsin	WCHA	21–14–4	At-large bid	19th	2000	4	Minnesota	WCHA	27–12–2	At-large bid	25th	1997
5	Providence	Hockey East	22–12–5	At-large bid	9th	1996	5	Maine	Hockey East	19–11–7	At-large bid	11th	2000
6	Mercyhurst	MAAC	22–11–2	Tournament champion	1st	Never	6	St. Lawrence	ECAC	20–12–4	Tournament champion	15th	2000

== Bracket ==
First Round; March 23–24
W4	Wisconsin	4
W5	Providence	1
E3	Colorado College	3**
E6	St. Lawrence	2
E4	Minnesota	4
E5	Maine	5*
W3	Michigan	4
W6	Mercyhurst	3

Quarterfinals; March 24–25
W1	Michigan State	5
W4	Wisconsin	1
E2	North Dakota	4
E3	Colorado College	1
E1	Boston College	3
E5	Maine	1
W2	St. Cloud State	3
W3	Michigan	4

National Semifinals; April 5
W1	Michigan State	0
E2	North Dakota	2
E1	Boston College	4
W3	Michigan	2

National Championship; April 7
E2	North Dakota	2
E1	Boston College	3*

(*) denotes overtime period(s)

== Results ==
=== East Regional – Worcester, Massachusetts ===
==== First Round ====
March 23, 2001; 5:00 pm	(3) Colorado College	3–2 (2OT) (1–0, 1–1, 0–1, 0–0, 1–0)	(6) St. Lawrence	Centrum Centre; Attendance: 6,000

Game reference

Jeff Sanger
Goalies
Jeremy Symington
Referee:
Steve Piotrowski
Linesmen:
Bruce Vita
Brian Hill

(Cullen) Peter Sejna – 10:22	1 – 0
	1 – 1	27:36 – PP – Erik Anderson (Gellard, Bartlett)
(Sejna) Noah Clarke – PP – 30:51	2 – 1
	2 – 2	47:26 – Russ Bartlett (Veneruzzo, Clarance)
(Morrison, Sejna) Paul Manning – GW – 83:30	3 – 2

8 min
Penalties
6 min
49
Shots
32

March 23, 2001; 9:30 pm	(4) Minnesota	4–5 (OT) (1–1, 1–1, 2–2, 0–1)	(5) Maine	Centrum Centre; Attendance: 8,745

Game reference

Adam Hauser
Goalies
Matt Yeats
Referee:
Duke Shegos
Linesmen:
Randy Schmidt
Dan Carey

(Westrum, Leopold) John Pohl – PP – 07:50	1 – 0
	1 – 1	19:54 – PP – Todd Jackson (Liscak, Janik)
(Pohl, Westrum) Grant Potulny – 28:44	2 – 1
	2 – 2	30:40 – Lucas Lawson (Kerluke, Kariya)
	2 – 3	42:58 – PP – Doug Janik (Dimitrakos, Reimann)
(Mills, Leopold) Grant Potulny – PP – 47:02	3 – 3
(Martin, Pohl) Erik Westrum – 49:26	4 – 3
	4 – 4	59:57 – EA PP – Michael Schutte (Dimitrakos, Kariya)
	4 – 5	73:04 – GW – Robert Liscak (unassisted)

14 min
Penalties
10 min
44
Shots
39

==== Quarterfinals ====
March 24, 2001; 8:30 pm	(1) Boston College	3–1 (0–0, 0–0, 3–1)	(5) Maine	Centrum Centre; Attendance: 11,977

Game reference

Scott Clemmensen
Goalies
Matt Yeats
Referee:
Steve Piotrowski

(Hughes, Allen) Jeff Giuliano – PP – 40:35	1 – 0
	1 – 1	41:41 – Michael Schutte (Trattnig, Kariya)
(Kolanos, Voce) Chuck Kobasew – GW – 46:15	2 – 1
(Orpik, Kolanos) Rob Scuderi – PP – 57:31	3 – 1

8 min
Penalties
54 min
26
Shots
30

March 24, 2001; 5:00 pm	(2) North Dakota	4–1 (1–0, 1–1, 2–0)	(3) Colorado College	Centrum Centre; Attendance: 11,977

Game reference

Karl Goehring
Goalies
Jeff Sanger
Referee:
Duke Shegos
Linesmen:
Marco Hunt
Greg Wohlers

(Panzer, Bayda) Bryan Lundbohm – 06:24	1 – 0
	1 – 1	30:59 – Alex Kim (Clarke)
(Bayda, Panzer) Bryan Lundbohm – GW – 36:09	2 – 1
(Panzer, B. Lundbohm) Ryan Bayda – 50:33	3 – 1
(Panzer, B. Lundbohm) Ryan Bayda – 53:20	4 – 1

6 min
Penalties
6 min
39
Shots
29

=== West Regional – Grand Rapids, Michigan ===
==== First Round ====
March 24, 2001; 5:30 pm	(3) Michigan	4–3 (2–2, 0–0, 2–1)	(6) Mercyhurst	Van Andel Arena; Attendance: 6,792

Game reference

Josh Blackburn
Goalies
Peter Aubry
Referee:
Mike Schmidt
Linesmen:
Matt Smith
Bill Jones

	0 – 1	03:31 – PP – Mike Muldoon (Goulet)
(Huntzicker) Scott Matzka – 07:11	1 – 1
(unassisted) Mike Cammalleri – 07:17	2 – 1
	2 – 2	18:31 – Brad Olsen (unassisted)
	2 – 3	46:15 – PP – Adam Tackaberry (Robinson, Gould)
(Hilbert, Komisarek) Mark Kosick – PP – 49:22	3 – 3
(Vancik, Cammalleri) Andy Hilbert – GW – 56:27	4 – 3

12 min
Penalties
14 min
51
Shots
24

March 24, 2001; 2:00 pm	(4) Wisconsin	4–1 (1–0, 2–1, 1–0)	(5) Providence	Van Andel Arena; Attendance: 6,900

Game reference

Graham Melanson
Goalies
Nolan Schaefer
Referee:
Scott Hansen
Linesmen:
Kevin Langseth
Butch Friedman

(Heatley, Boeser) Matt Hussey – 01:42	1 – 0
(Davyduke, Boeser) Dany Heatley – GW PP – 24:07	2 – 0
(Hussey, Doman) Matt Murray – 31:17	3 – 0
	3 – 1	38:41 – Adam Lee (Suderman, Picinic)
(Davyduke, Hergert) Andy Wheeler – 53:52	4 – 1

14 min
Penalties
14 min
29
Shots
33

==== Quarterfinals ====
March 25, 2001; 2:00 pm	(1) Michigan State	5–1 (2–0, 2–1, 1–0)	(4) Wisconsin	Van Andel Arena; Attendance: 9,484

Game reference

(out 56:54) Ryan Miller
(in 56:54) Joe Blackburn
Goalies
Graham Melanson (out 54:14)
Scott Kabotoff (in 54:14)
Referee:
John Gravellese
Linesmen:
Bill Jones
Matt Smith

(unassisted) Joe Insana – 07:45	1 – 0
(Fast, Ferguson) Sean Patchell – GW PP – 19:02	2 – 0
	2 – 1	28:52 – PP – Matt Hussey (Wheeler, Bourque)
(Patchell) John Nail – 29:04	3 – 1
(Maloney, Dolyny) Joe Goodenow – PP – 31:50	4 – 1
(Goodenow, Maloney) Rustyn Dolyny – PP – 45:42	5 – 1

28 min
Penalties
44 min
33
Shots
28

March 25, 2001; 5:30 pm	(2) St. Cloud State	3–4 (0–2, 1–1, 2–1)	(3) Michigan	Van Andel Arena; Attendance: 9,484

Game reference

Scott Meyer
Goalies
Josh Blackburn
Referee:
Scott Hansen
Linesmen:
Tom Carponito
Bob Bernard

	0 – 1	13:30 – PP – Mark Kosick (Komisarek, Roemensky)
	0 – 2	17:59 – Josh Langfeld (Kosick, Huntzicker)
(DiCasmirro) Brandon Sampair – 26:38	1 – 2
	1 – 3	37:19 – Mike Cammalleri (Koch, Hilbert)
(Arnason) Mark Hartigan – PP – 41:24	2 – 3
	2 – 4	43:20 – GW – Geoff Koch (Hilbert)
(Motzko, Cullen) Keith Anderson – PP – 54:52	3 – 4

12 min
Penalties
10 min
21
Shots
33

=== Frozen Four – Albany, New York ===
==== National Semifinals ====
April 5, 2001; 1:30 pm	(W1) Michigan State	0–2 (0–2, 0–0, 0–0)	(E2) North Dakota	Pepsi Arena; Attendance: 13,252

Game reference
Ryan Miller	Goalies	Karl Goehring	Referee: Michael Schmitt; Linesmen: Bill Jones; Matt Smith
0 – 1 / 01:15 – GW – Kevin Spiewak (Notermann, D. Lundbohm); 0 – 2 / 15:32 – PP – Ryan Bayda (B. Lundbohm, Roche)			Referee: Michael Schmitt; Linesmen: Bill Jones; Matt Smith
6 min	Penalties	8 min	Referee: Michael Schmitt; Linesmen: Bill Jones; Matt Smith
30	Shots	36	Referee: Michael Schmitt; Linesmen: Bill Jones; Matt Smith

April 5, 2001; 7:30 pm	(E1) Boston College	4–2 (2–0, 1–1, 1–1)	(W3) Michigan	Pepsi Arena; Attendance: 13,252

Game reference

Scott Clemmensen
Goalies
Josh Blackburn
Referee:
Steve Piotrowski
Linesmen:
Randy Schmidt
Dan Carey

(Voce, Scuderi) Chuck Kobasew – 10:06	1 – 0
(Allen, Gionta) Ben Eaves – PP – 14:29	2 – 0
(Scuderi, Orpik) Chuck Kobasew – GW PP – 31:38	3 – 0
	3 – 1	32:24 – John Shouneyia (Jillson, Langfeld)
	3 – 2	45:12 – Mike Cammalleri (Huntzicker)
(unassisted) Ben Eaves – EN – 59:39	4 – 2

8 min
Penalties
8 min
36
Shots
33

==== National Championship ====
April 7, 2001; 7:00 pm	(E1) Boston College	3–2 (OT) (0–0, 2–0, 0–2, 1–0)	(E2) North Dakota	Pepsi Arena; Attendance: 13,667

Game reference
Referee: Mike Schmitt; Linesmen: Bill Jones; Matt Smith

Scoring summary
Period	Team	Goal	Assist(s)	Time	Score
1st	No scoring				
2nd	BC	Chuck Kobasew (27) – PP	Giuliano	25:26	1–0 BC
2nd	BC	Mike Lephart (15)	Forrest and Allen	28:50	2–0 BC
3rd	UND	Tim Skarperud (10) – PP EA	Roche and B. Lundbohm	56:18	2–1 BC
3rd	UND	Wes Dorey (17) – EA	Schneekloth and B. Lundbohm	59:23	2–2
1st Overtime	BC	Krys Kolanos (25) – GW	Kobasew and Voce	64:43	3–2 BC
Penalty summary
Period	Team	Player	Penalty	Time	PIM
1st	UND	David Hale	Cross-checking	2:49	2:00
1st	BC	Brett Peterson	Interference	8:32	2:00
1st	BC	Krys Kolanos	Goaltender interference	12:20	2:00
1st	UND	Jason Notermann	Hooking	14:02	2:00
2nd	UND	Aaron Schneekloth	Hooking	24:27	2:00
2nd	BC	Mike Lephart	Holding	32:45	2:00
2nd	BC	Tony Voce	Slashing	34:49	2:00
2nd	UND	Aaron Schneekloth	Tripping	36:10	2:00
3rd	BC	J. D. Forrest	Tripping	40:49	2:00
3rd	UND	Kevin Spiewak	Slashing	41:34	2:00
3rd	UND	David Lundbohm	Hooking	42:51	2:00
3rd	BC	Brooks Orpik	Interference	51:06	2:00
3rd	UND	Tim Skarperud	Slashing	53:31	2:00
3rd	BC	Bench	Too many men (served by A. J. Walker)	55:07	2:00
1st Overtime	none				

Shots by period
Team	1	2	3	OT	T
North Dakota	9	9	16	3	37
Boston College	9	12	7	3	31

Goaltenders
Team	Name	Saves	Goals against	Time on ice
UND	Karl Goehring	28	3	63:26
BC	Scott Clemmensen	35	2	64:43

== All-Tournament team ==
- G: Scott Clemmensen (Boston College)
- D: Travis Roche (North Dakota)
- D: Rob Scuderi (Boston College)
- F: Chuck Kobasew* (Boston College)
- F: Krys Kolanos (Boston College)
- F: Bryan Lundbohm (North Dakota)

* Most Outstanding Player(s)

== Record by conference ==
Conference	# of Bids	Record	Win %	Regional semifinals	Frozen Four	Championship Game	Champions
WCHA	5	4-4	.500	4	1	1	-
Hockey East	3	4-2	.666	2	1	1	1
CCHA	2	3-2	.600	2	2	-	-
ECAC	1	0-1	.000	-	-	-	-
MAAC	1	0-1	.000	-	-	-	-
