= NCAA Division I men's ice hockey tournament appearances by team =

NCAA Division 1 ice hockey tournament 2022

The following is a list of National Collegiate Athletic Association (NCAA) Division I college ice hockey teams that have qualified for the NCAA Division I men's ice hockey championship as of 2026 with teams listed by number of appearances. Michigan and Minnesota have the most appearances with 42.

== List of appearances ==
NCAA men's Division I ice hockey tournament
| School | Tournament appearances | Tournament years | Best result |
|---|---|---|---|
| Michigan | 42 | 1948, 1949, 1950, 1951, 1952, 1953, 1954, 1955, 1956, 1957, 1962, 1964, 1977, 1991, 1992, 1993, 1994, 1995, 1996, 1997, 1998, 1999, 2000, 2001, 2002, 2003, 2004, 2005, 2006, 2007, 2008, 2009, 2010, 2011, 2012, 2016, 2018, 2021, 2022, 2023, 2024, 2026 | Champions (1948, 1951, 1952, 1953, 1955, 1956, 1964, 1996, 1998) |
| Minnesota | 42 | 1953, 1954, 1961, 1971, 1974, 1975, 1976, 1979, 1980, 1981, 1983, 1985, 1986, 1987, 1988, 1989, 1990, 1991, 1992, 1993, 1994, 1995, 1996, 1997, 2001, 2002, 2003, 2004, 2005, 2006, 2007, 2008, 2012, 2013, 2014, 2015, 2017, 2021, 2022, 2023, 2024, 2025 | Champions (1974, 1976, 1979, 2002, 2003) |
| Boston University | 40 | 1950, 1951, 1953, 1960, 1966, 1967, 1971, 1972, 1974, 1975, 1976, 1977, 1978, 1984, 1986, 1990, 1991, 1992, 1993, 1994, 1995, 1996, 1997, 1998, 2000, 2002, 2003, 2005, 2006, 2007, 2009, 2012, 2015, 2016, 2017, 2018, 2021, 2023, 2024, 2025 | Champions (1971, 1972, 1978, 1995, 2009) |
| Boston College | 38 | 1948, 1949, 1950, 1954, 1956, 1959, 1963, 1965, 1968, 1973, 1978, 1984, 1985, 1986, 1987, 1989, 1990, 1991, 1998, 1999, 2000, 2001, 2003, 2004, 2005, 2006, 2007, 2008, 2010, 2011, 2012, 2013, 2014, 2015, 2016, 2021, 2024, 2025 | Champions (1949, 2001, 2008, 2010, 2012) |
| North Dakota | 36 | 1958, 1959, 1963, 1965, 1967, 1968, 1979, 1980, 1982, 1984, 1987, 1990, 1997, 1998, 1999, 2000, 2001, 2003, 2004, 2005, 2006, 2007, 2008, 2009, 2010, 2011, 2012, 2013, 2014, 2015, 2016, 2017, 2021, 2022, 2024, 2026 | Champions (1959, 1963, 1980, 1982, 1987, 1997, 2000, 2016) |
| Denver | 35 | 1958, 1960, 1961, 1963, 1964, 1966, 1968, 1969, 1971, 1972, 1973†, 1986, 1995, 1997, 1999, 2002, 2004, 2005, 2008, 2009, 2010, 2011, 2012, 2013, 2014, 2015, 2016, 2017, 2018, 2019, 2022, 2023, 2024, 2025, 2026 | Champions (1958, 1960, 1961, 1968, 1969, 2004, 2005, 2017, 2022, 2024, 2026) |
| Michigan State | 30 | 1959, 1966, 1967, 1982, 1983, 1984, 1985, 1986, 1987, 1988, 1989, 1990, 1992, 1994, 1995, 1996, 1997, 1998, 1999, 2000, 2001, 2002, 2004, 2006, 2007, 2008, 2012, 2024, 2025, 2026 | Champions (1966, 1986, 2007) |
| Wisconsin | 28 | 1970, 1972, 1973, 1977, 1978, 1981, 1982, 1983, 1988, 1989, 1990, 1991, 1992†, 1993, 1994, 1995, 1998, 2000, 2001, 2004, 2005, 2006, 2008, 2010, 2013, 2014, 2021, 2024, 2026 | Champions (1973, 1977, 1981, 1983, 1990, 2006) |
| Harvard | 27 | 1955, 1957, 1958, 1969, 1971, 1974, 1975, 1982, 1983, 1985, 1986, 1987, 1988, 1989, 1993, 1994, 2002, 2003, 2004, 2005, 2006, 2015, 2016, 2017, 2019, 2022, 2023 | Champions (1989) |
| Cornell | 26 | 1967, 1968, 1969, 1970, 1972, 1973, 1980, 1981, 1986, 1991, 1996, 1997, 2002, 2003, 2005, 2006, 2009, 2010, 2012, 2017, 2018, 2019, 2023, 2024, 2025, 2026 | Champions (1967, 1970) |
| Clarkson | 22 | 1957, 1958, 1962, 1963, 1966, 1970, 1981, 1982, 1984, 1990, 1991, 1992, 1993, 1995, 1996, 1997, 1998, 1999, 2007, 2008, 2018, 2019 | Runners-Up (1962, 1966, 1970) |
| New Hampshire | 22 | 1977, 1979, 1982, 1987, 1992, 1994, 1995, 1997, 1998, 1999, 2000, 2002, 2003, 2004, 2005, 2006, 2007, 2008, 2009, 2010, 2011, 2013 | Runners-Up (1999, 2003) |
| Colorado College | 20 | 1948, 1949, 1950, 1951, 1952, 1955, 1957, 1979, 1995, 1996, 1997, 1998, 1999, 2001, 2002, 2003, 2005, 2006, 2008, 2011 | Champions (1950, 1957) |
| Maine | 20 | 1987, 1988, 1989, 1990, 1991, 1992, 1993, 1995, 1999, 2000, 2001, 2002, 2003, 2004, 2005, 2006, 2007, 2012, 2024, 2025 | Champions (1993, 1999) |
| Providence | 17 | 1964, 1978, 1981, 1983, 1985, 1989, 1991, 1996, 2001, 2014, 2015, 2016, 2017, 2018, 2019, 2025, 2026 | Champions (2015) |
| St. Cloud State | 17 | 1989, 2000, 2001, 2002, 2003, 2007, 2008, 2010, 2013, 2014, 2015, 2016, 2018, 2019, 2021, 2022, 2023 | Runners-Up (2021) |
| Michigan Tech | 16 | 1956, 1960, 1962, 1965, 1969, 1970, 1974, 1975, 1976, 1981, 2015, 2017, 2018, 2022, 2023, 2024 | Champions (1962, 1965, 1975) |
| Minnesota Duluth | 16 | 1983, 1984, 1985, 1993, 2004, 2009, 2011, 2012, 2015, 2016, 2017, 2018, 2019, 2021, 2022, 2026 | Champions (2011, 2018, 2019) |
| St. Lawrence | 16 | 1952, 1955, 1956, 1959, 1960, 1961, 1962, 1983, 1987, 1988, 1989, 1992, 1999, 2000, 2001, 2007, 2021‡ | Runners-Up (1961, 1988) |
| Notre Dame | 13 | 2004, 2007, 2008, 2009, 2011, 2013, 2014, 2016, 2017, 2018, 2019, 2021, 2022 | Runners-Up (2008, 2018) |
| Miami | 12 | 1993, 1997, 2004, 2006, 2007, 2008, 2009, 2010, 2011, 2012, 2013, 2015 | Runners-Up (2009) |
| Quinnipiac | 12 | 2002, 2013, 2014, 2015, 2016, 2019, 2021, 2022, 2023, 2024, 2025, 2026 | Champions (2023) |
| Lake Superior State | 11 | 1985, 1988, 1989, 1990, 1991, 1992, 1993, 1994, 1995, 1996, 2021 | Champions (1988, 1992, 1994) |
| Minnesota State | 11 | 2003, 2013, 2014, 2015, 2018, 2019, 2021, 2022, 2023, 2025, 2026 | Runners-Up (2022) |
| Ohio State | 11 | 1998, 1999, 2003, 2004, 2005, 2009, 2017, 2018, 2019, 2023, 2025 | Frozen Four (1998, 2018) |
| Western Michigan | 11 | 1986, 1994, 1996, 2011, 2012, 2017, 2022, 2023, 2024, 2025, 2026 | Champions (2025) |
| Bowling Green | 10 | 1977, 1978, 1979, 1982, 1984, 1987, 1988, 1989, 1990, 2019 | Champions (1984) |
| Rensselaer | 9 | 1953, 1954, 1961, 1964, 1984, 1985, 1994, 1995, 2011 | Champions (1954, 1985) |
| Massachusetts Lowell | 9 | 1988, 1994, 1996, 2012, 2013, 2014, 2016, 2017, 2022 | Frozen Four (2013) |
| Northeastern | 8 | 1982, 1988, 1994, 2009, 2016, 2018, 2019, 2022 | Frozen Four (1982) |
| Northern Michigan | 8 | 1980, 1981, 1989, 1991, 1992, 1993, 1999, 2010 | Champions (1991) |
| Yale | 8 | 1952, 1998, 2009, 2010, 2011, 2013, 2015, 2016 | Champions (2013) |
| Air Force | 7 | 2007, 2008, 2009, 2011, 2012, 2017, 2018 | Regional Final (2009, 2017, 2018) |
| Colgate | 6 | 1981, 1990, 2000, 2005, 2014, 2023 | Runners-Up (1990) |
| Vermont | 6 | 1988, 1996, 1997, 2009, 2010, 2014 | Frozen Four (1996, 2009) |
| Massachusetts | 6 | 2007, 2019, 2021, 2022, 2024, 2025 | Champions (2021) |
| Bemidji State | 5 | 2005, 2006, 2009, 2010, 2021 | Frozen Four (2009) |
| Dartmouth | 5 | 1948, 1949, 1979, 1980, 2026 | Runners-Up (1948, 1949) |
| Omaha | 5 | 2006, 2011, 2015, 2021, 2024 | Frozen Four (2015) |
| Penn State | 5 | 2017, 2018, 2023, 2025, 2026 | Frozen Four (2025) |
| Union | 5 | 2011, 2012, 2013, 2014, 2017 | Champions (2014) |
| Brown | 4 | 1951, 1965, 1976, 1993 | Runners-Up (1951) |
| Ferris State | 4 | 2003, 2012, 2014, 2016 | Runners-Up (2012) |
| Merrimack | 4 | 1988, 2011, 2023, 2026 | Regional Final (1988) |
| Niagara | 4 | 2000, 2004, 2008, 2013 | Regional Final (2000) |
| Princeton | 4 | 1998, 2008, 2009, 2018 | First Round (1998, 2008, 2009, 2018) |
| RIT | 4 | 2010, 2015, 2016, 2024 | Frozen Four (2010) |
| Alaska Anchorage | 3 | 1990, 1991, 1992 | Regional Final (1991) |
| American International | 3 | 2019, 2021, 2022 | Regional Final (2019) |
| Mercyhurst | 3 | 2001, 2003, 2005 | First Round (2001, 2003, 2005) |
| Alabama–Huntsville | 2 | 2007, 2010 | First Round (2007, 2010) |
| Bentley | 2 | 2025, 2026 | First Round (2025) |
| Canisius | 2 | 2013, 2023 | First Round (2013, 2023) |
| Connecticut | 2 | 2025, 2026 | Regional Final (2025) |
| Holy Cross | 2 | 2004, 2006 | Regional Final (2006) |
| Arizona State | 1 | 2019 | First Round (2019) |
| Robert Morris | 1 | 2014 | First Round (2014) |
| Wayne State | 1 | 2003 | First Round (2003) |
| Alaska | 0 | 2010† | First Round (2010) |

Schools in Italics no longer compete in Division I.

† Appearance vacated by the NCAA.

‡ St. Lawrence received an automatic bid to the 2021 tournament but withdrew before seeding.

== Teams without a tournament appearance ==
The following active Division I programs have never qualified for the NCAA tournament.

| School | Joined Div. I |
|---|---|
| Army | 1980† |
| Augustana | 2023 |
| Lindenwood | 2022 |
| Long Island | 2020 |
| Sacred Heart | 1998 |
| St. Thomas | 2021 |
| Stonehill | 2022 |

† Army played in Division II from 1973 through 1980 but was in the top division prior to 1973.
