= 2002 NCAA Division I men's ice hockey tournament =

- 2002 Frozen Four logo
- Teams: 12
- Finals site: Xcel Energy Center, Saint Paul, Minnesota
- Champions: Minnesota Golden Gophers (4th title)
- Runner-up: Maine Black Bears (4th title game)
- Semifinalists: Michigan Wolverines (21st Frozen Four); New Hampshire Wildcats (7th Frozen Four)
- Winning coach: Don Lucia (1st title)
- MOP: Grant Potulny (Minnesota)
- Attendance: 91,931

The 2002 NCAA Division I men's ice hockey tournament involved 12 schools playing in single-elimination play to determine the national champion of men's NCAA Division I college ice hockey.

The final event was played at Xcel Energy Center, Saint Paul, Minnesota. The University of Minnesota, coached by Don Lucia, won its first NCAA title since 1979 by defeating the University of Maine, coached by Tim Whitehead, 4-3, in overtime on April 6. Matt Koalska tied the game with 53 seconds remaining in regulation with Minnesota goaltender Adam Hauser pulled for an extra attacker. Grant Potulny then won it on his power-play goal at 16:58 of the extra session, giving the Golden Gophers their fourth NCAA championship (6th overall). Minnesota senior forward John Pohl assisted on both the tying and winning goals in his final game in a Gophers uniform.

Minnesota advanced to the finals with a 3-2 semifinal win over Michigan on April 4, after Maine had bested Hockey East rival New Hampshire by a 7-2 score in the other semifinal.

== Game locations ==
2002 Regionals (blue) and Frozen Four (red)

The NCAA Men's Division I Ice Hockey Championship is a single-elimination tournament featuring 12 teams representing five Division I conferences in the nation. The Championship Committee seeds the entire field from 1 to 12 within two regionals of 6 teams. The winners of five Division I conference championships receive automatic bids to participate in the NCAA Championship. The top regional placements are given to the best teams from each of the two regions (East and West) while the remaining 10 teams are seeded based upon their rankings regardless of region.

=== Regional Sites ===
- East Regional – Centrum Centre, Worcester, Massachusetts
- West Regional – Yost Ice Arena, Ann Arbor, Michigan

=== Championship Site ===
- Frozen Four – Xcel Energy Center, Saint Paul, Minnesota

== Qualifying teams ==
The at-large bids and seeding for each team in the tournament were announced after the conference tournaments concluded on March 17, 2002. The Western Collegiate Hockey Association (WCHA) had four teams receive a berth in the tournament, Hockey East had three teams receive a berth in the tournament, the Central Collegiate Hockey Association (CCHA), and the ECAC each had two berths, while the Metro Atlantic Athletic Conference (MAAC) received a single bid for its tournament champion.

East Regional – Worcester							West Regional – Ann Arbor						
Seed	School	Conference	Record	Berth type	Appearance	Last bid	Seed	School	Conference	Record	Berth type	Appearance	Last bid
1	New Hampshire (1)	Hockey East	29–6–3	Tournament champion	12th	2000	1	Denver (2)	WCHA	32–7–1	Tournament champion	16th	1999
2	Boston University (4)	Hockey East	25–9–3	At-large bid	26th	2000	2	Minnesota (3)	WCHA	29–8–4	At-large bid	26th	2001
3	Maine	Hockey East	23–10–7	At-large bid	12th	2001	3	Michigan State	CCHA	27–8–5	At-large bid	22nd	2001
4	Cornell	ECAC	24–7–2	At-large bid	13th	1997	4	Michigan	CCHA	26–10–5	Tournament champion	25th	2001
5	Quinnipiac	MAAC	20–12–5	Tournament champion	1st	Never	5	St. Cloud State	WCHA	29–10–2	At-large bid	4th	2001
6	Harvard	ECAC	15–14–4	Tournament champion	17th	1994	6	Colorado College	WCHA	26–12–3	At-large bid	15th	2001

Number in parentheses denotes overall seed in the tournament.

== Bracket ==
First Round; March 22–23
E4	Cornell	6
E5	Quinnipiac	1
E3	Maine	4*
E6	Harvard	3
W4	Michigan	4
W5	St. Cloud State	2
W3	Michigan State	0
W6	Colorado College	2

Quarterfinals; March 23–24
E1	New Hampshire (1)	4
E4	Cornell	3
East Regional
E2	Boston University (4)	3
E3	Maine	4
W1	Denver (2)	3
W4	Michigan	5
West Regional
W2	Minnesota (3)	4
W6	Colorado College	2

National Semifinals; April 4
E1	New Hampshire (1)	2
E3	Maine	7
W4	Michigan	2
W2	Minnesota (3)	3

National Championship; April 6
E3	Maine	3
W2	Minnesota (3)	4*

Number in parentheses denotes overall seed in the tournament
(*) denotes overtime period(s)

== Results ==
=== East Regional – Worcester, Massachusetts ===
==== First Round ====
March 23, 2002; 12:00 pm	(3) Maine	4–3 (OT) (1–1, 2–1, 0–1, 1–0)	(6) Harvard	Centrum Centre; Attendance: 8,889

Game reference

Mike Morrison
Goalies
Dov Grumet-Morris
Referee:
Mark Wilkins
Linesmen:
Marco Hunt
Greg Wohlers

	0 – 1	07:55 – Tim Pettit (Cavanaugh)
(Kariya, Reimann) Niko Dimitrakos – PP – 10:27	1 – 1
	1 – 2	23:43 – Dave McCulloch (Nowak, Kolarik)
(Reimann) Chris Heisten – 32:08	2 – 2
(Liscak, Jackson) Michael Schutte – 34:22	3 – 2
	3 – 3	36:15 – PP – Tom Cavanagh (Pettit, Welch)
(Falco) John Ronan – GW – 62:02	4 – 3

6 min
Penalties
10 min
37
Shots
22

March 23, 2002; 3:40 pm	(4) Cornell	6–1 (4–0, 1–0, 1–1)	(5) Quinnipiac	Centrum Centre; Attendance: 10,545

Game reference

Matt Underhill
Goalies
Jamie Holden (out 03:30)
Justin Eddy (in 03:30)
Referee:
Mike Schmitt
Linesmen:
Joe Ross
John Jones

(Knoepfli) Krzysztof Wieckowski – 01:29	1 – 0
(unassisted) Sam Paolini – GW – 03:30	2 – 0
(McRae, Vesce) Douglas Murray – PP – 08:57	3 – 0
(McRae) Kelly Hughes – 14:24	4 – 0
(Bâby, McRae) Ryan Vesce – PP – 27:56	5 – 0
(Knoepfli) Stephen Bâby – SH – 43:28	6 – 0
	6 – 1	55:23 – Ryan Morton (unassisted)

14 min
Penalties
25 min
35
Shots
14

==== Quarterfinals ====
March 24, 2002; 3:30 pm	(1) New Hampshire	4–3 (3–2, 0–0, 1–1)	(4) Cornell	Centrum Centre; Attendance: 11,888

Game reference

Matt Carney
Goalies
Matt Underhill
Referee:
Steve Piotrowski
Linesmen:
Marco Hunt
Greg Wohlers

(Callander, Barker) Jim Abbott – 01:55	1 – 0
	1 – 1	04:32 – Stephen Bâby (Palahicky, McRae)
	1 – 2	05:37 – PP – Sam Paolini (Vesce, Bâby)
(Haydar, Collins) Colin Hemingway – PP – 06:39	2 – 2
(Collins, Haydar) Colin Hemingway – PP – 11:22	3 – 2
	3 – 3	53:17 – Shane Palahicky (Bell)
(Stafford) Jim Abbott – GW – 57:21	4 – 3

10 min
Penalties
14 min
24
Shots
18

March 24, 2002; 12:00 pm	(2) Boston University	3–4 (1–1, 0–0, 2–3)	(3) Maine	Centrum Centre; Attendance: 11,888

Game reference

Sean Fields
Goalies
Matt Yeats

	0 – 1	03:47 – Róbert Liščák (Metcalf, Lawson)
(Collins) Mike Pandolfo – PP – 07:14	1 – 1
	1 – 2	43:48 – PP – Lucas Lawson (Liscak, Nault)
(Magowan, Bussoli) David Klema – 50:14	2 – 2
	2 – 3	50:54 – Lucas Lawson (unassisted)
	2 – 4	55:37 – GW – Colin Shields (unassisted)
(Mullen, Cronin) David Klema – 56:58	3 – 4

25 min
Penalties
12 min
34
Shots
34

=== West Regional – Ann Arbor, Michigan ===
==== First Round ====
March 22, 2002; 4:30 pm	(3) Michigan State	0–2 (0–1, 0–0, 0–1)	(6) Colorado College	Yost Ice Arena

Game reference
Ryan Miller	Goalies	Jeff Sanger	Referee: John Gravallese; Linesmen: Bill Jones; Matt Smith
0 – 1 / 10:05 – GW – Trent Clark (Petiot); 0 – 2 / 45:43 – Alex Kim (Clarke, Polaski)			Referee: John Gravallese; Linesmen: Bill Jones; Matt Smith
6 min	Penalties	8 min	Referee: John Gravallese; Linesmen: Bill Jones; Matt Smith
25	Shots	29	Referee: John Gravallese; Linesmen: Bill Jones; Matt Smith

March 22, 2002; 8:00 pm	(4) Michigan	4–2 (3–1, 0–0, 1–1)	(5) St. Cloud State	Yost Ice Arena; Attendance: 6,948

Game reference

Josh Blackburn
Goalies
Dean Weasler (out 20:00)
Jake Moreland (in 20:00)
Referee:
Scott Hanson
Linesmen:
Bob Bernard
Joe Andrews

(Shouneyia, Mink) Jason Ryznar – 04:09	1 – 0
	1 – 1	05:19 – PP – Jeff Finger (Cullen, Motzko)
(Werner) Craig Murray – PP – 13:20	2 – 1
(Helminen, Roemensky) Milan Gajic – GW – 14:21	3 – 1
	3 – 2	24:19 – PP – Jon Cullen (Motzko, Malone)
(Gajic) Dwight Helminen – 54:40	4 – 2

16 min
Penalties
16 min
24
Shots
24

==== Quarterfinals ====
March 23, 2002; 7:30 pm	(1) Denver	3–5 (0–0, 3–2, 0–3)	(4) Michigan	Yost Ice Arena; Attendance: 6,933

Game reference

Wade Dubielewicz
Goalies
Josh Blackburn
Referee:
John Gravallese
Linesmen:
Joe Andrews
Bob Bernard

	0 – 1	20:56 – Eric Nystrom (Shouneyia, Ortmeyer)
(James, Caldwell) Chris Paradise – PP – 23:05	1 – 1
	1 – 2	25:43 – PP – Mike Komisarek (Shouneyia, Ortmeyer)
(Ulanski, Cook) Kevin Doell – PP – 29:16	2 – 2
(Bull, MacKenzie) Luke Fulghum – 32:25	3 – 2
	3 – 3	44:47 – Eric Werner (Cammalleri)
	3 – 4	58:39 – GW – Jed Ortmeyer (Nystrom, Cammalleri)
	3 – 5	59:33 – EN – Eric Nystrom (Cammalleri)

10 min
Penalties
12 min
21
Shots
38

March 23, 2002; 4:00 pm	(2) Minnesota	4–2 (1–1, 2–1, 1–0)	(6) Colorado College	Yost Ice Arena

Game reference

Adam Hauser
Goalies
Jeff Sanger
Referee:
Tom Goddard
Linesmen:
John LaDuke
Paul Tunison

	0 – 1	07:52 – Alex Kim (unassisted)
(Pohl, Riddle) Grant Potulny – 10:30	1 – 1
(Ballard, Riddle) Nick Angell – PP – 28:26	2 – 1
(Welch) Jeff Taffe – GW – 29:24	3 – 1
	3 – 2	33:26 – Peter Sejna (Heerema)
(unassisted) John Pohl – SH – 45:56	4 – 2

24 min
Penalties
20 min
41
Shots
35

=== Frozen Four – St. Paul, Minnesota ===
==== National Semifinals ====
April 4, 2002; 12:30 pm	(E1) New Hampshire	2–7 (2–1, 0–2, 0–4)	(E3) Maine	Xcel Energy Center

Game reference

Mike Ayers
Goalies
Mike Morrison
Referee:
Mike Schmitt
Linesmen:
Gregg Wohlers
Marco Hunt

(unassisted) Sean Collins – 00:21	1 – 0
	1 – 1	03:34 – Róbert Liščák (Jackson, Shaneberger)
(Busch) Steve Saviano – SH – 17:55	2 – 1
	2 – 2	23:37 – Peter Metcalf (Heisten)
	2 – 3	25:57 – GW – Peter Metcalf (Falco)
	2 – 4	48:16 – Róbert Liščák (Jackson)
	2 – 5	52:20 – Lucas Lawson (Dimitrakos, Metcalf)
	2 – 6	53:30 – Paul Falco (Liscak)
	2 – 7	56:21 – PP – Paul Falco (Murphy, Ronan)

16 min
Penalties
14 min
25
Shots
40

April 4, 2002; 6:30 pm	(W2) Minnesota	3–2 (1–0, 1–0, 1–2)	(E4) Michigan	Xcel Energy Center; Attendance: 19,234

Game reference

Adam Hauser
Goalies
Josh Blackburn

(Taffe) Grant Potulny – 04:20	1 – 0
(Leopold, Pohl) Grant Potulny – PP – 24:33	2 – 0
(Welch) Jeff Taffe – GW – 41:40	3 – 0
	3 – 1	53:55 – SH – J.J. Swistak (Roemensky)
	3 – 2	58:26 – EA – Jed Ortmeyer (Nystrom, Cammalleri)

18 min
Penalties
22 min
26
Shots
29

==== National Championship ====
April 6, 2002; 6:00 pm	(W2) Minnesota	4–3 (OT) (1–0, 1–1, 1–2, 1–0)	(E3) Maine	Xcel Energy Center; Attendance: 19,324

Game reference
Referee: Steve Piotrowski; Linesmen: John LaDuke; Kevin Langseth

Scoring summary
Period	Team	Goal	Assist(s)	Time	Score
1st	MIN	Keith Ballard (10) – PP	Riddle and Angell	7:18	1–0 MIN
2nd	Maine	Michael Schutte (12) – PP	Metcalf and Dimitrakos	24:47	1–1
2nd	MIN	John Pohl (27)	Anthony and Angell	25:38	2–1 MIN
3rd	Maine	Michael Schutte (13)	Ryan and Jackson	46:18	2–2
3rd	Maine	Róbert Liščák (17)	Dimitrakos	55:27	3–2 Maine
3rd	MIN	Matt Koalska (10) – EA	Riddle and Pohl	59:07	3–3
1st Overtime	MIN	Grant Potulny (15) – GW PP	Pohl and Leopold	76:58	4–3 MIN
Penalty summary
Period	Team	Player	Penalty	Time	PIM
1st	Maine	Cliff Loya	Holding	5:40	2:00
1st	Maine	Ben Murphy	Goaltender interference	9:20	2:00
1st	Maine	Cliff Loya	Cross-checking	10:08	2:00
1st	MIN	Grant Potulny	Holding the stick	13:18	2:00
1st	Maine	Ben Murphy	High-sticking	16:34	2:00
2nd	MIN	Grant Potulny	Interference	23:47	2:00
2nd	MIN	Keith Ballard	Obstruction – Holding	29:37	2:00
2nd	Maine	Gray Shaneberger	Tripping	33:02	2:00
3rd	MIN	Jeff Taffe	Boarding	49:15	2:00
3rd	Maine	Lucas Lawson	Hitting after the whistle	59:19	2:00
3rd	MIN	Matt DeMarchi	Hitting after the whistle	59:19	2:00
1st Overtime	Maine	Michael Schutte	Tripping	75:58	2:00

Shots by period
Team	1	2	3	OT	T
Maine	11	13	16	5	45
Minnesota	11	8	9	7	35

Goaltenders
Team	Name	Saves	Goals against	Time on ice
Maine	Matthew Yeats	31	4	76:58
MIN	Adam Hauser	42	3	76:52

== All-Tournament team ==
- G: Adam Hauser (Minnesota)
- D: Peter Metcalf (Maine)
- D: Michael Schutte (Maine)
- F: Róbert Liščák (Maine)
- F: John Pohl (Minnesota)
- F: Grant Potulny* (Minnesota)

* Most Outstanding Player(s)

== Record by conference ==
Conference	# of Bids	Record	Win %	Regional semifinals	Frozen Four	Championship Game	Champions
WCHA	4	4-3	.571	3	1	1	1
Hockey East	3	4-3	.571	3	2	1	-
CCHA	2	2-2	.500	1	1	-	-
ECAC	2	1-2	.333	1	-	-	-
MAAC	1	0-1	.000	-	-	-	-
