= Keith Ballard =

American ice hockey player (born 1982)

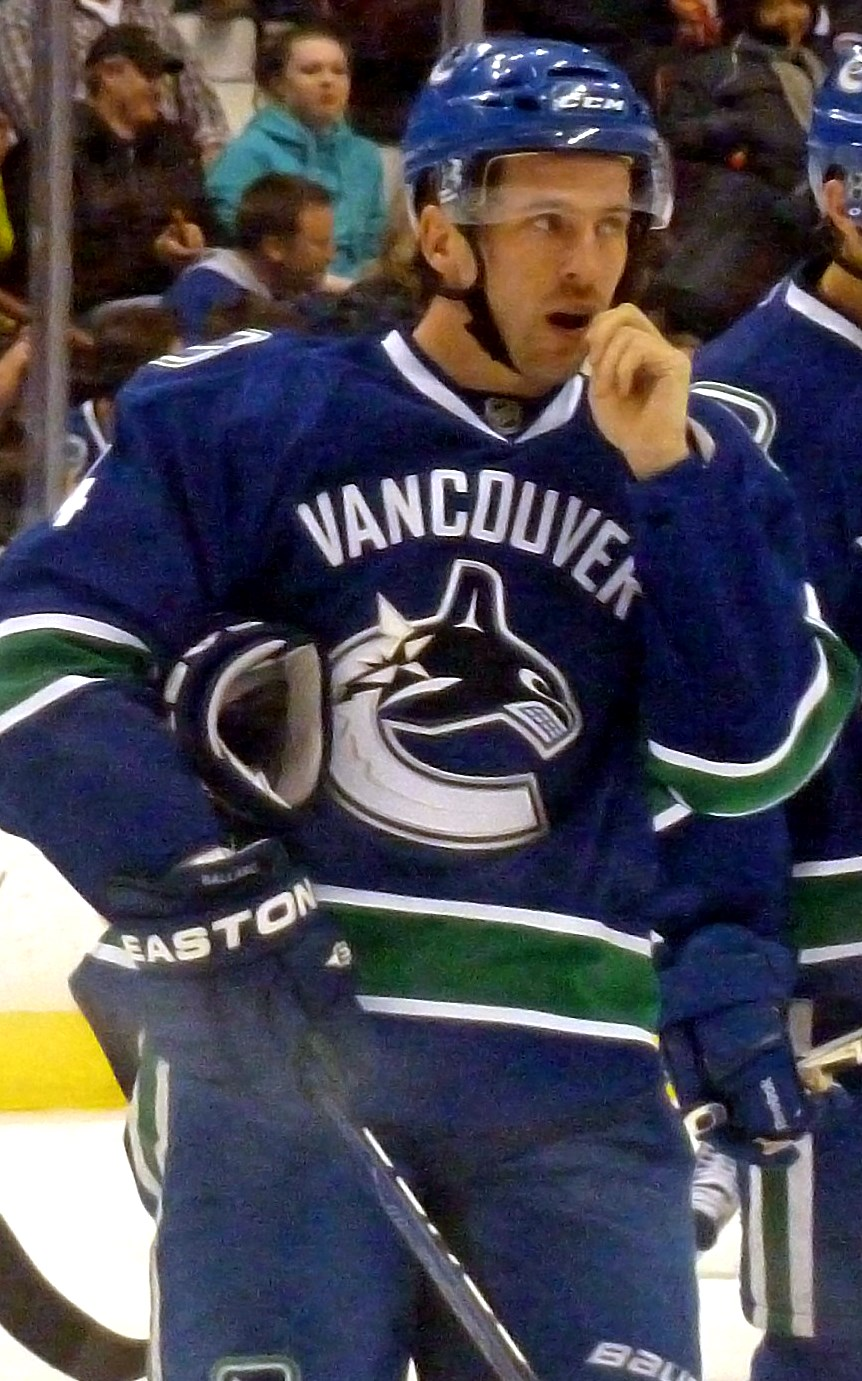
- Ballard with the Vancouver Canucks in March 2011
- Born: November 26, 1982 (age 43) Baudette, Minnesota, U.S.
- Height: 5 ft 11 in (180 cm)
- Weight: 208 lb (94 kg; 14 st 12 lb)
- Position: Defense
- Shot: Left
- Played for: Phoenix Coyotes; Florida Panthers; Vancouver Canucks; Minnesota Wild
- National team: United States
- NHL draft: 11th overall, 2002; Buffalo Sabres
- Playing career: 2004–2015

Keith Galen Ballard (born November 26, 1982) is an American former professional ice hockey player. A defenseman, he previously played in the National Hockey League (NHL) with the Phoenix Coyotes, Florida Panthers, Vancouver Canucks and Minnesota Wild. He played college hockey for the Minnesota Golden Gophers of the Western Collegiate Hockey Association (WCHA) for three seasons. After his freshman year, he was selected 11th overall by the Buffalo Sabres in the 2002 NHL entry draft. Before he made his NHL debut, he was traded twice – initially to the Colorado Avalanche, then to the Phoenix Coyotes. He played his professional rookie season in 2004–05 with the Coyotes' American Hockey League (AHL) affiliate, the Utah Grizzlies, then debuted with Phoenix the following season. After three years, he was traded to the Florida Panthers, where he spent two seasons before being dealt to Vancouver at the 2010 NHL entry draft.

Internationally, Ballard has represented the United States in four World Championships, winning bronze in 2004. He has also played in two junior tournaments – the 2000 IIHF World U18 Championships and 2002 World Junior Championships.

== Playing career ==
=== Junior and college (1999–2004) ===
Ballard played two seasons at the junior level in the United States Hockey League (USHL), initially with the United States National Development Team in 1999–00, then the Omaha Lancers the following season. He recorded 51 points over 56 games in 2000–01. With a league-leading 22 goals among defensemen, he earned First Team All-Star honors and a selection to the 2001 USHL All-Star Game. In the post-season, he helped the Lancers win the Clark Cup as league champions, scoring seven points in ten playoff games.

In 2001–02, Ballard began a three-year tenure of college hockey with the Minnesota Golden Gophers of the Western Collegiate Hockey Association (WCHA), a conference within the National Collegiate Athletic Association (NCAA). He joined a defensive corps in Minnesota that included future NHL players Jordan Leopold and Paul Martin. Ballard was a much-anticipated freshman and was named the WCHA's pre-season rookie of the year. Making his collegiate debut on October 5, 2001, he notched two assists against the North Dakota Fighting Sioux. Ballard started his rookie campaign on a six-game point streak that included two goals and four assists. Recording 10 goals and 23 points over 41 games total as a freshman, he earned WCHA All-Rookie Team honors. In the first round of the subsequent WCHA playoffs, he scored the series-clinching goal in overtime to eliminate North Dakota. The Golden Gophers advanced to the 2002 NCAA Championships, where they captured their first of back-to-back national titles. Ballard scored the first goal of the NCAA final against the Maine Black Bears, helping Minnesota to a 4–3 win in overtime.

The following year, Ballard recorded a college career-high 41 points over 45 games, fourth among NCAA defensemen and third in team scoring. He was named a WCHA All-Academic and University of Minnesota Scholar Athlete for combined performance with the Golden Gophers and in classes. He helped the Golden Gophers to the Broadmoor Trophy as WCHA playoff champions and earned WCHA Final Five All-Tournament Team honors after recording two assists and a +4 rating in the final two games of the post-season. The Gophers then defeated the New Hampshire Wildcats in the 2003 NCAA Final by a 5–1 score to repeat as national champions. Ballard received NCAA West Regional All-Star honors for his efforts during the tournament.

Ballard was named an alternate captain in his third year and produced 11 goals and 36 points over 37 games. His 0.97 points-per-game average ranked second among NCAA defensemen, while his five game winning goals were second among all WCHA players and fifth in the NCAA. Ballard served as captain in place of Grant Potulny when the latter was sidelined with injury. Ballard was also sidelined for seven games during the campaign himself with a knee injury. He was voted by his teammates as Minnesota's most valuable player and received WCHA First All-Star Team, WCHA All-Tournament Team and NCAA West First All-Star Team honors. Ballard was also one of ten finalists for the Hobey Baker Award, given to the NCAA's top men's ice hockey player (it was awarded to Junior Lessard of the Minnesota-Duluth Bulldogs). However, the Golden Gophers failed to defend their national championship, losing their regional final to Minnesota-Duluth.

Ballard left the Golden Gophers seventh all-time among team defensemen with 33 goals. He was also the 74th player in team history to reach 100 points, which also ranked him 11th among defensemen.

=== Phoenix Coyotes (2004–08) ===
Ballard was selected in the first round, 11th overall, by the Buffalo Sabres in the 2002 NHL entry draft. The choice was seen as a surprise by draft observers, as he was projected to be a late first-round to second-round pick. Ballard himself professed the early selection to be unexpected, saying he was ready to be drafted between the 20th and 40th positions. Scouting reports listed him as a puck-rushing offensive defenseman with comparisons to Phil Housley. Before making his NHL debut, he was traded twice. He was initially dealt by Buffalo to the Colorado Avalanche on July 3, 2003, for Steven Reinprecht. The following year, he was traded again to the Phoenix Coyotes, along with defenseman Derek Morris, for forward Chris Gratton, defenseman Ossi Väänänen and a second-round pick in the 2005 draft.

Ballard signed with Phoenix a year later to an entry-level contract worth an annual $1.2 million over three years, including bonuses. With his NHL contract, he decided to forgo his senior year of college hockey. The decision was spurred by his performance at the 2004 World Championships with Team USA, competing with NHL veterans. Ballard indicated he would only leave the University of Minnesota if he was offered the maximum allowable contract for a rookie, as designated by the collective bargaining agreement of the time, which he received.

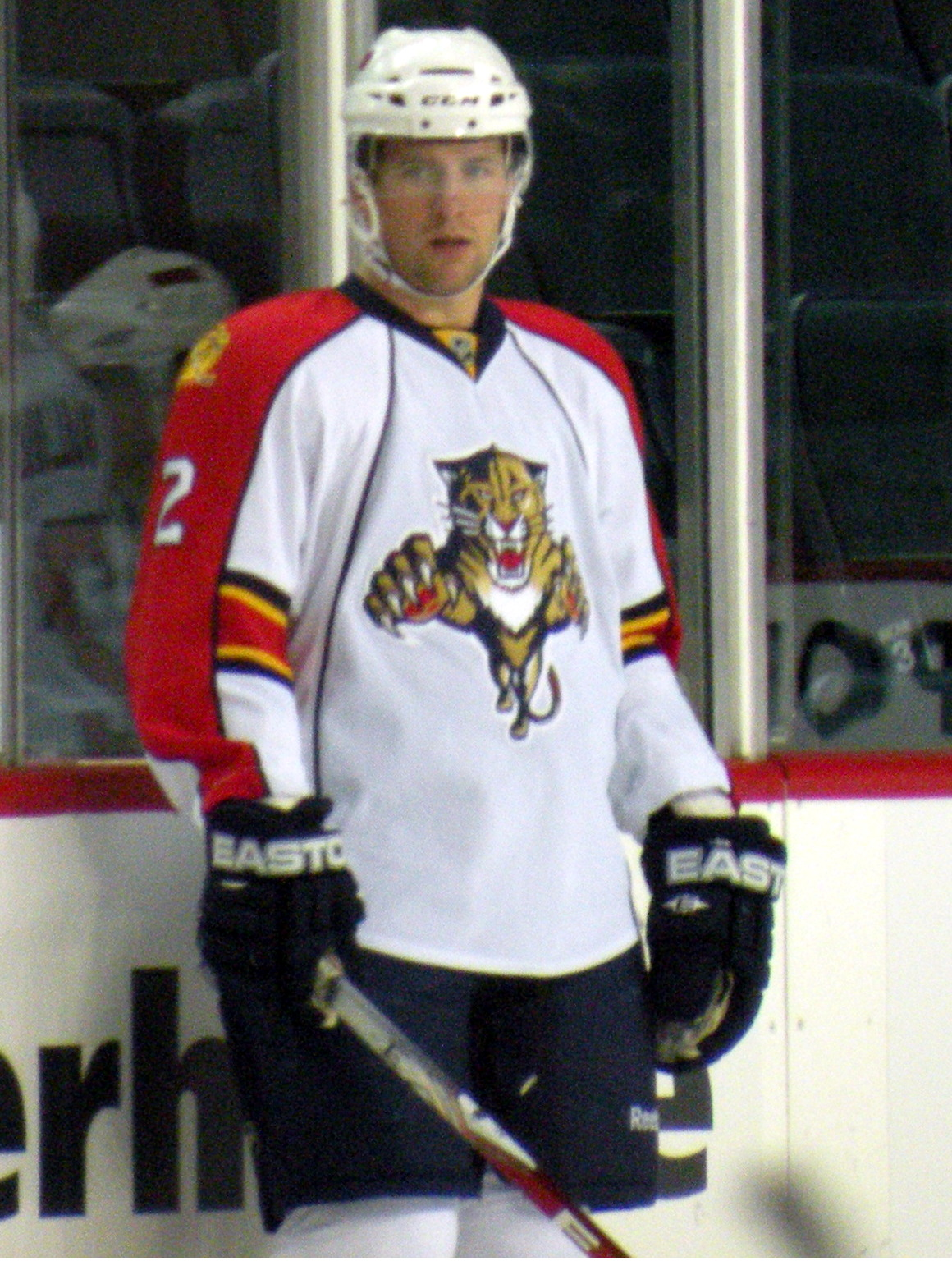
Ballard in his first season with the Panthers in December 2008

Due to the NHL lockout, Ballard made his professional debut in the American Hockey League (AHL) with the Coyotes' minor league affiliate, the Utah Grizzlies in 2004–05. He notched two goals and 20 points over 60 games in his professional rookie campaign. As NHL resumed play the following season, Ballard played his first game with the Coyotes on October 5, 2005, against the Vancouver Canucks. He scored his first NHL goal in his debut, beating goaltender Dan Cloutier. Ballard finished with 8 goals and 39 points as a rookie; both remain career highs. He led all NHL defensemen in shorthanded goals with three. Ballard was sidelined for 13 games in his second NHL season due to a bone fracture in his hand, suffered while blocking a shot during a game on October 9, 2006. He went on to record 27 points in 69 games. In the off-season, he was re-signed on August 29, 2007, to a two-year contract. In 2007–08, Ballard recorded a career-low 21 points.

=== Florida Panthers (2008–2010) ===
During the 2008 NHL entry draft, Ballard was dealt (along with defenseman Nick Boynton and a second-round pick in the draft) to the Florida Panthers in exchange for forward Olli Jokinen. Upon trading for Ballard, Florida head coach Jacques Martin heralded him as the club's number-two defenseman, behind Jay Bouwmeester. Prior to the 2008–09 season, Ballard signed a six-year, $25.2 million contract extension with the Panthers. The deal came with a season remaining on his existing contract, previously signed with the Coyotes.

Ballard went on to tally 34 points during his first campaign with Florida in 2008–09. The following season, on November 30, 2009, Ballard was involved in an on-ice incident that injured his own teammate, goaltender Tomáš Vokoun. After being on the ice for a goal during a game against the Atlanta Thrashers, Ballard aimed to smash his stick in frustration against the post and mistakenly hit Vokoun in the mask. Vokoun was taken from the ice on a stretcher and suffered a cut on his ear that required stitches; he missed two games before returning to the lineup. Ballard, who apologized to Vokoun following the game, was not disciplined by the Panthers or the NHL. However, there has been some controversy over whether the slash to Vokoun's head was intentional or not. He went on to match his career-high eight goals and added 20 assists for 28 points in his second season with the Panthers. He also ranked third in the league in blocked shots with 201. Ballard had played parts of the season with a hip injury. After completing the campaign, he underwent the second hip surgery of his career in May 2010 to repair a stress fracture and remove a cyst.

=== Vancouver Canucks (2010–2013) ===
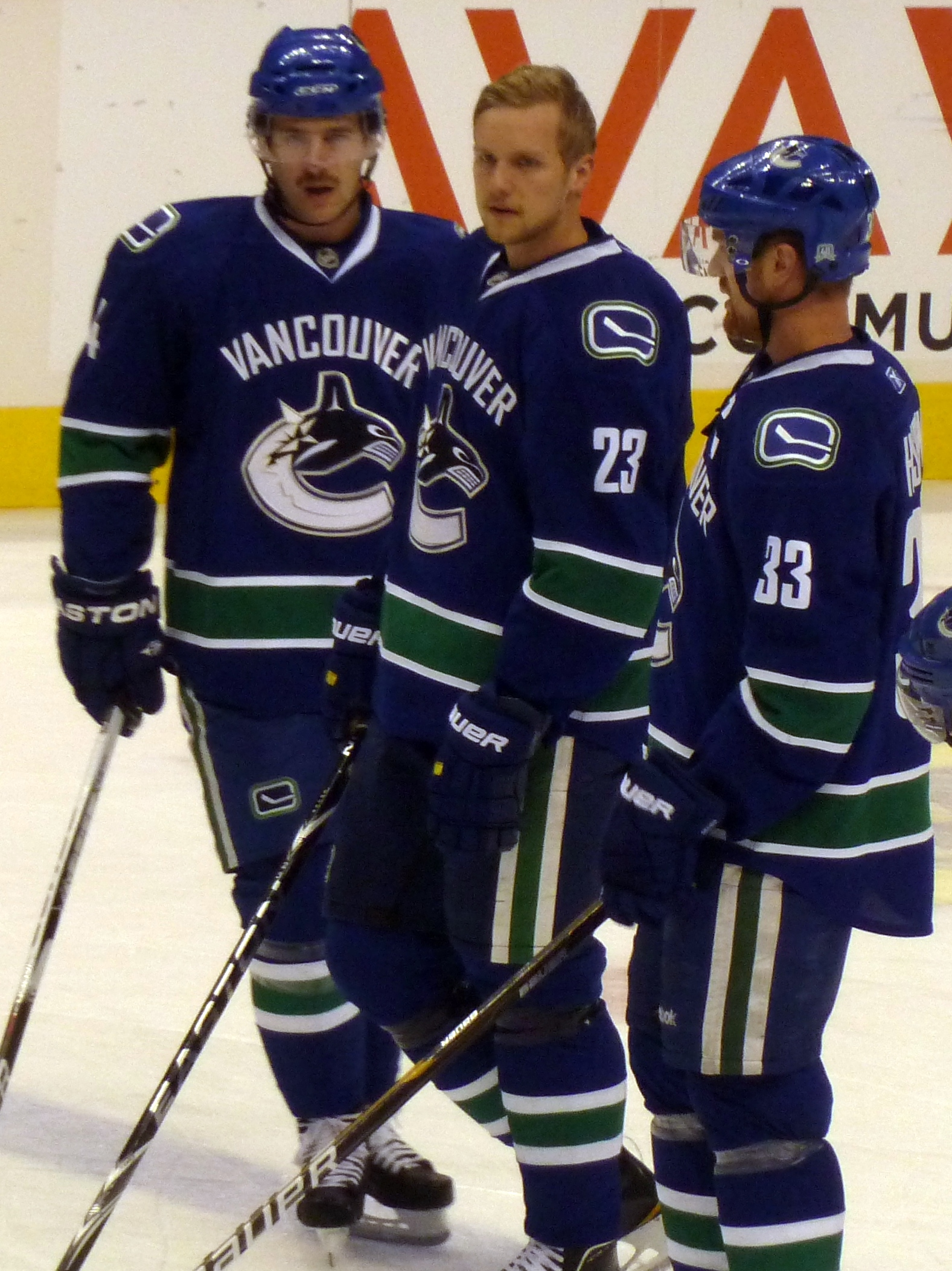
Ballard (left) stands with Canucks teammates Alexander Edler and captain Henrik Sedin in November 2010.

On June 25, 2010, during the 2010 NHL entry draft, Ballard was traded to the Vancouver Canucks (along with Victor Oreskovich) in exchange for Michael Grabner, Steve Bernier and Vancouver's first-round pick, the 25th overall selection ultimately used to select Quinton Howden. After spending two months of the off-season on crutches while recovering from surgery, he reported to the Canucks' training camp, but struggled in the pre-season. Four games into the regular season, he suffered a concussion after being hit into the boards by Los Angeles Kings forward Brad Richardson on October 16, 2010. He was subsequently sidelined for five games. However, upon returning to the lineup, his play continued to struggle. Averaging 13 minutes of ice time a game, he was eventually taken out of the lineup for four games in November by Canucks head coach Alain Vigneault. It marked the first time in his career he was a healthy scratch. After being re-insterted into the lineup, he scored his first goal as a Canuck in a 6–1 win against the San Jose Sharks on November 26. Several months later, Ballard suffered a sprained medial collateral ligament (MCL) in his right knee during a game against the Ottawa Senators on February 7, 2011. The injury resulted from opposing forward Milan Michalek tripping him from behind, which Canucks general manager Mike Gillis pointed out did not occur anywhere near the puck, alluding to the play as illegal and disrespectable. Ballard finished his first regular season with career lows in games played (65), goals (2), assists (5), points (7) and average ice time per game (15 minutes and 14 seconds). His individual struggles came amidst a franchise record season for the Canucks, who won the Presidents' Trophy as the NHL's regular season champion for the first time in team history. Entering the playoffs as the first seed in the West, the Canucks advanced past the Chicago Blackhawks, Nashville Predators and San Jose Sharks to qualify for the 2011 Stanley Cup Finals. Facing the Boston Bruins, Vancouver lost the Stanley Cup in Game 7. Over the team's 25 playoff games, Ballard dressed for 10. Playing only one game of the final two rounds, he dropped in the depth chart behind Aaron Rome and rookie Chris Tanev.

Ballard continued to be used as a third-pairing defenseman in his second season with Vancouver. He missed five contests in November and December 2011 due to a back injury, before sustaining a season-ending concussion on February 5, 2012. Initially undetected, the injury was caused by two separate hits during a game against the Colorado Avalanche. He remained in the lineup for the following contest before being diagnosed with the injury. His season ended with 1 goal and 7 points over 47 games. His third season with the Canucks was shortened by the 2012–13 NHL lockout. When the season started, Ballard was again on the Canucks' third pairing, with Tanev. Early in the season, the two were the Canucks' most consistent pairing. An injury to Kevin Bieksa allowed Andrew Alberts to get into the line-up and split the Ballard–Tanev pairing. After Bieksa's return, it was Ballard who was removed from the line-up, becoming a healthy scratch. In late March, Vancouver suffered several injuries up front, and to help fill the void, Ballard returned to the line-up as a forward. He played three games before suffering a broken foot. Though he was healthy by the playoffs, Vancouver opted to play Alberts and rookie Frank Corrado in their first round elimination to San Jose. He finished the year playing in 36 games and recording two assists.

=== Minnesota Wild (2013–2015) ===
With the salary cap decreasing in the 2013 off-season, Vancouver needed to unload salary. Ballard had two years remaining on his contract with an annual value $4.2 million. The Canucks tried to trade Ballard in an attempt to avoid using a compliance buyout on him. When that failed, the team placed him on waivers. He cleared waivers before Vancouver ultimately bought him out. Two days after becoming a free agent, he signed a two-year, $3 million contract with the Minnesota Wild.

In his second season with the Wild, Ballard was hit by the New York Islanders' Matt Martin after making a pass. The hit was delivered as Ballard turned away from Martin. Ballard's head struck a glass partition and as he fell his head bounced off the ice. He lay on the ice for a few minutes before being able to leave the ice on his own. Ballard suffered a concussion and multiple facial fractures as a result. He was taken to Regions Hospital for evaluation and observation and released the next day. There was no penalty or suspension in result of the hit.

As a free agent in the 2015 off-season, Ballard was still suffering from post-concussion syndrome and opted to end his professional career to pursue studies in sport science at the University of Minnesota.

== International play ==
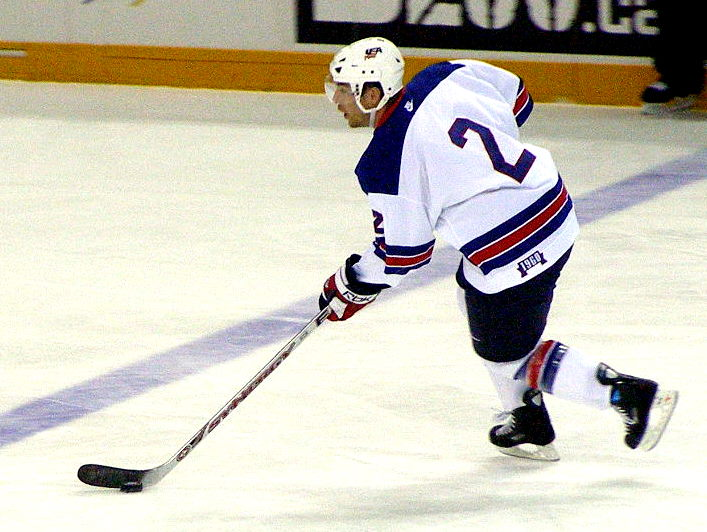
- Ballard during the 2008 IIHF World Championship

Medal record

Representing United States

Ice hockey

IIHF World Championship
Bronze medal – third place	2004 Czech Republic	

Ballard made his international debut with Team USA at the 2000 IIHF World U18 Championships in Switzerland. He was named to the squad while playing in the National Under-18 Development Program for the 1999–2000 season. He contributed a goal and an assist in six games, as the United States finished in eighth place. Two years later, Ballard was named to the under-20 squad for the 2001 World Junior Championships in the Czech Republic. He played in seven games, recording a goal and an assist. The United States lost in the quarterfinal to Russia and went on to place in fifth after defeating Sweden 3–2 in a consolation match.

Following his third year with the Minnesota Golden Gophers, Ballard debuted with the United States men's team for the 2004 World Championships in the Czech Republic. He was named to the squad after forward Scott Gomez withdrew himself for personal reasons. As the lone NCAA player on the national squad, he helped the United States to a bronze medal finish. His lone goal of the tournament and first career goal in men's international competition came during a 7–1 round-robin win against Ukraine.

Three years later, Ballard began a three-year stretch of consecutive appearances at the World Championships. He recorded an international career-high three assists at the 2007 tournament in Russia as the United States were eliminated in a 5–4 shootout loss to Finland in the quarter-final. Competing in Quebec City and Halifax, the following year, Ballard recorded two assists in five games while ranking seventh among team defensemen in average ice time per game. The United States finished in sixth place, losing in the quarter-final to Finland. Ballard made his second bronze medal game appearance with the United States at the 2009 IIHF World Championship in Switzerland, but lost to Sweden by a 4–2 score. He contributed a goal and two assists in nine games while ranking second on the squad in plus-minus with a +3 rating and sixth among team defensemen in average ice time per game.

== Playing style ==
Ballard is a two-way defenseman, capable of contributing both offensively and defensively. Known for his hard hitting, specifically with hip checks, he led his club in hits during his first five years in the NHL. He is also proficient in shot-blocking. Offensively, Ballard is noted as a quick and smooth skater, making him able to start plays from the defensive zone. At the 2012 Canucks SuperSkills Competition, he won the fastest skater segment by circling the rink in 13.440 seconds. He has a reputation as a player with intensity and a competitive edge.

== Personal life ==
Ballard was born in Baudette, Minnesota, to parents Steve and Joanne. He has a sister, Jessie. His family runs a fishing resort at Lake of the Woods in Minnesota, founded by Ballard's grandparents in 1961.

Ballard left home following his sophomore year of high school to pursue his hockey career with the U.S. National Development Team in Ann Arbor, Michigan. During his time with the Omaha Lancers, he graduated from Millard North High School in Omaha, Nebraska. He was a multi-sport athlete during high school, having earned an All-Conference selection as a fullback and linebacker playing football and finishing as Conference championship runner-up as a golfer.

Ballard and his wife have three children.

== Career statistics ==
=== Regular season and playoffs ===
			Regular season					Playoffs
Season	Team	League	GP	G	A	Pts	PIM	GP	G	A	Pts	PIM
1999–2000	US NTDP Juniors	USHL	58	12	21	33	119	—	—	—	—	—
2000–01	Omaha Lancers	USHL	56	22	29	51	168	10	1	6	7	8
2001–02	Minnesota Golden Gophers	WCHA	41	10	13	23	42	—	—	—	—	—
2002–03	Minnesota Golden Gophers	WCHA	45	12	29	41	78	—	—	—	—	—
2003–04	Minnesota Golden Gophers	WCHA	37	11	25	36	83	—	—	—	—	—
2004–05	Utah Grizzlies	AHL	60	2	18	20	88	—	—	—	—	—
2005–06	Phoenix Coyotes	NHL	82	8	31	39	99	—	—	—	—	—
2006–07	Phoenix Coyotes	NHL	69	5	22	27	59	—	—	—	—	—
2007–08	Phoenix Coyotes	NHL	82	6	15	21	85	—	—	—	—	—
2008–09	Florida Panthers	NHL	82	6	28	34	72	—	—	—	—	—
2009–10	Florida Panthers	NHL	82	8	20	28	88	—	—	—	—	—
2010–11	Vancouver Canucks	NHL	65	2	5	7	53	10	0	0	0	6
2011–12	Vancouver Canucks	NHL	47	1	6	7	64	4	0	1	1	2
2012–13	Vancouver Canucks	NHL	36	0	2	2	29	—	—	—	—	—
2013–14	Minnesota Wild	NHL	45	2	7	9	37	3	0	0	0	0
2014–15	Minnesota Wild	NHL	14	0	1	1	26	—	—	—	—	—
NHL totals			604	38	137	175	612	17	0	1	1	8

=== International ===
Year	Team	Event	Result	GP	G	A	Pts	PIM
2000	United States	WJC18	8th	6	1	1	2	4
2002	United States	WJC	5th	7	1	1	2	4
2004	United States	WC	3rd place, bronze medalist(s)	8	1	0	1	2
2007	United States	WC	5th	7	0	3	3	16
2008	United States	WC	6th	5	0	2	2	16
2009	United States	WC	4th	9	1	2	3	2
Junior totals				13	2	2	4	8
Senior totals				29	2	7	9	36

== Awards ==
Award	Year
USHL All-Star Game	2001
USHL First Team All-Star	2001
NCAA national title (with Minnesota Golden Gophers)	2002 and 2003
WCHA All-Rookie Team	2001-02
WCHA All-Academic Team	2002-03
University of Minnesota Scholar Athlete	2002-03
WCHA Second Team	2002-03
WCHA All-Tournament Team	2003
WCHA First Team	2003-04
AHCA West First-Team All-American	2003–04
John Mariucci Award (Minnesota Golden Gophers MVP)	2003-04
WCHA All-Tournament Team	2004
Hobey Baker Award finalist	2004

Sporting positions
Preceded by Jiří Novotný	Buffalo Sabres first-round draft pick 2002	Succeeded by Daniel Paille
