= John Pohl =

American ice hockey player (born 1979)

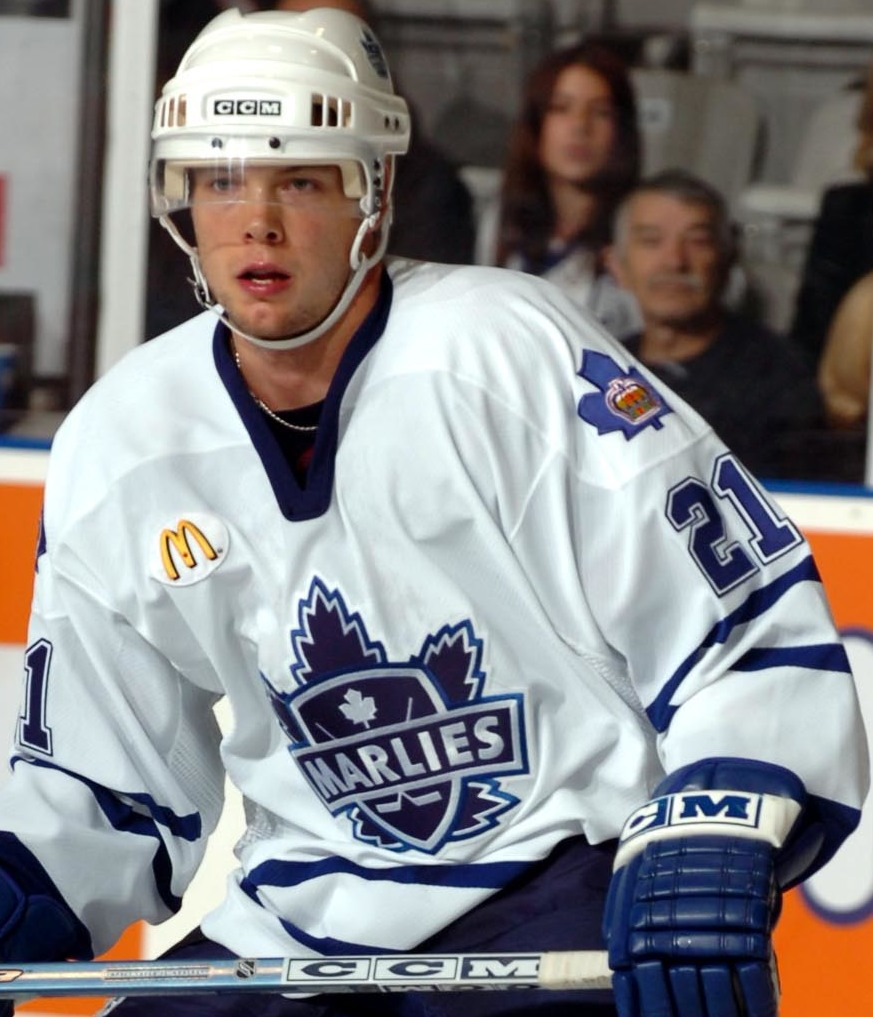
- Pohl with the Toronto Marlies in 2005
- Born: June 29, 1979 (age 46) Rochester, Minnesota, U.S.
- Height: 6 ft 0 in (183 cm)
- Weight: 194 lb (88 kg; 13 st 12 lb)
- Position: Center
- Shot: Right
- Played for: St. Louis Blues; Toronto Maple Leafs; HC Lugano; Frölunda HC
- National team: United States
- NHL draft: 255th overall, 1998; St. Louis Blues
- Playing career: 2002–2010

John August "Johnny" Pohl (born June 29, 1979) is an American former professional ice hockey center who played in the National Hockey League (NHL).

== Playing career ==
Pohl played for the University of Minnesota where he helped lead the team to the 2002 NCAA National Championship. He was also a standout player at Red Wing High School in Red Wing, Minnesota, where he grew up; during his senior year there he was voted Minnesota's 1998 "Mr. Hockey." Pohl was drafted by the St. Louis Blues 255th overall in the 1998 NHL entry draft, and played one game with the Blues during the 2003–04 NHL season. He was traded to the Toronto Maple Leafs for future considerations on August 24, 2005. During the 2005–06 NHL season, Pohl played seven games for the Leafs and chipped in with three goals and one assist. His first goal in the NHL was scored in a 6–3 Maple Leafs victory against the New Jersey Devils on December 31, 2005. On February 17, 2007, Pohl recorded his first career two-goal effort against the Edmonton Oilers.

On July 29, 2009, Pohl signed a one-year contract returning to North America with the Chicago Wolves of the American Hockey League.

== Personal ==
His wife is Krissy Wendell, former captain of the American national women's hockey team and member of the Hockey Hall of Fame. Pohl had been introduced by her brother, Erik, who was Pohl's teammate and roommate at the University of Minnesota.

Following his career in professional hockey, Pohl assumed a teaching job within the business department of Cretin-Derham Hall in Minnesota, and later Hill-Murray School also in Minnesota. In 2018, Pohl was named athletic director at Hill-Murray School.

== Career statistics ==
=== Regular season and playoffs ===
			Regular season					Playoffs
Season	Team	League	GP	G	A	Pts	PIM	GP	G	A	Pts	PIM
1994–95	Red Wing Wingers	MSHSL	28	19	42	61	—	—	—	—	—	—
1995–96	Red Wing Wingers	MSHSL	28	42	57	99	—	—	—	—	—	—
1996–97	Red Wing Wingers	MSHSL	28	54	57	111	—	—	—	—	—	—
1997–98	Red Wing Wingers	MSHSL	28	29	78	107	—	—	—	—	—	—
1997–98	Twin City Vulcans	USHL	10	6	3	9	10	—	—	—	—	—
1998–99	Minnesota Golden Gophers	WCHA	42	7	10	17	18	—	—	—	—	—
1999–00	Minnesota Golden Gophers	WCHA	41	18	41	59	26	—	—	—	—	—
2000–01	Minnesota Golden Gophers	WCHA	38	19	26	45	24	—	—	—	—	—
2001–02	Minnesota Golden Gophers	WCHA	44	27	52	79	26	—	—	—	—	—
2002–03	Worcester IceCats	AHL	58	26	32	58	34	3	0	1	1	6
2003–04	Worcester IceCats	AHL	65	16	25	43	65	3	0	1	1	2
2003–04	St. Louis Blues	NHL	1	0	0	0	0	—	—	—	—	—
2004–05	Worcester IceCats	AHL	13	3	6	9	2	—	—	—	—	—
2005–06	Toronto Marlies	AHL	59	36	37	73	40	5	1	5	6	10
2005–06	Toronto Maple Leafs	NHL	7	3	1	4	4	—	—	—	—	—
2006–07	Toronto Maple Leafs	NHL	74	13	16	29	10	—	—	—	—	—
2007–08	Toronto Maple Leafs	NHL	33	1	4	5	10	—	—	—	—	—
2008–09	HC Lugano	NLA	22	3	22	25	26	—	—	—	—	—
2008–09	Frölunda HC	SEL	12	5	7	12	6	11	2	7	9	8
2009–10	Chicago Wolves	AHL	66	20	33	53	12	14	3	3	6	2
NHL totals			115	17	21	38	24	—	—	—	—	—

=== International ===
Year	Team	Event	Result	GP	G	A	Pts	PIM
2003	United States	WC	13th	6	3	4	7	0
Senior totals				6	3	4	7	0

== Awards and honors ==
Award	Year
College
All-WCHA Second Team	1999–00
All-WCHA First Team	2001–02
AHCA West First-Team All-American	2001–02
All-NCAA All-Tournament Team	2002

Awards and achievements
Preceded by Jeff Panzer	NCAA Ice Hockey Scoring Champion; 2001–02	Succeeded by Peter Sejna
