= Michael Schutte =

Canadian ice hockey player

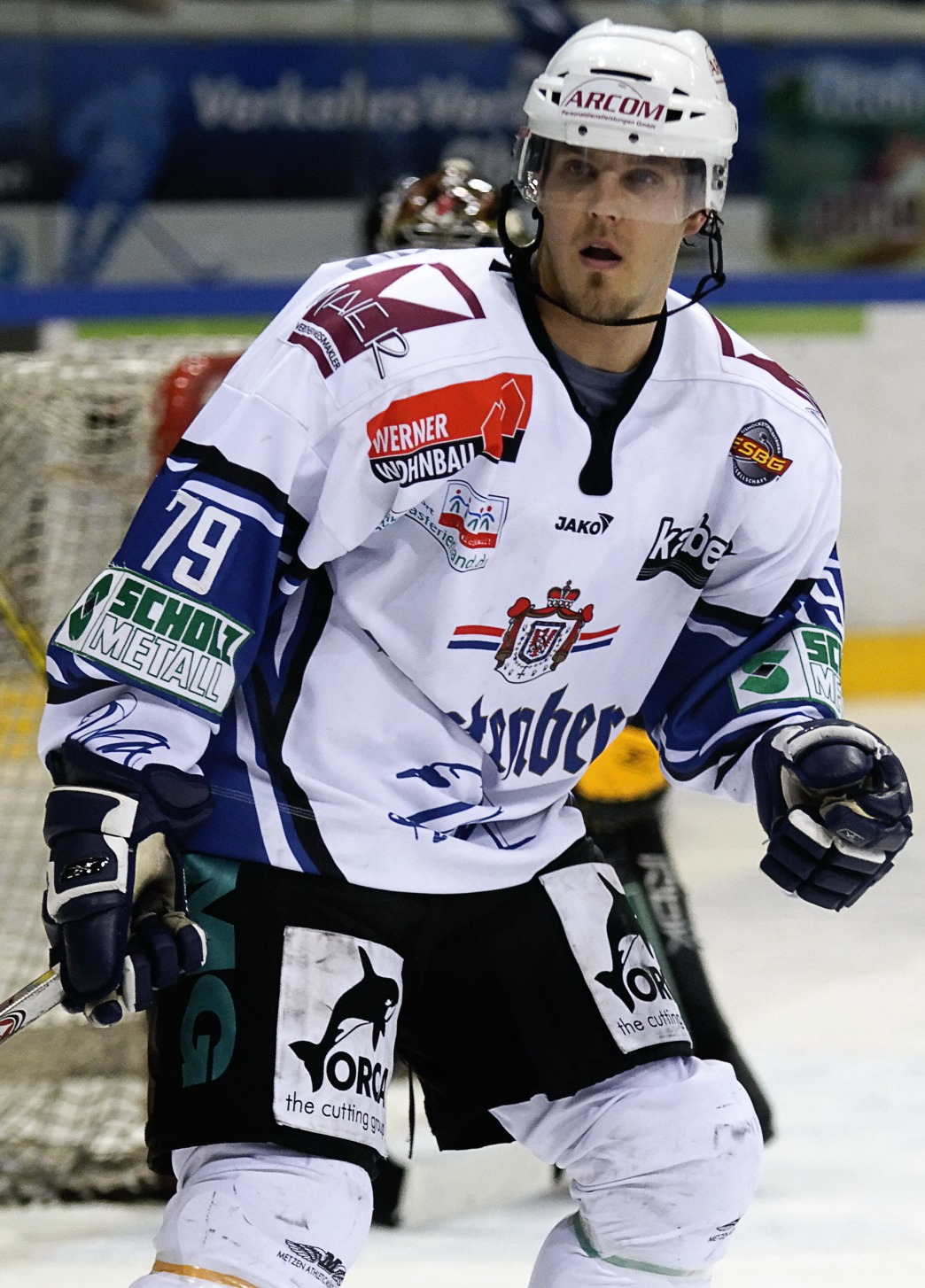
- Schutte with the SERC Wild Wings in 2008
- Born: July 28, 1979 (age 46) Burlington, Ontario, Canada
- Height: 6 ft 2 in (188 cm)
- Weight: 200 lb (91 kg; 14 st 4 lb)
- Position: Defence
- Shot: Left
- Played for: Springfield Falcons; Lowell Lock Monsters; Houston Aeros; Dayton Bombers; Cincinnati Mighty Ducks; Trenton Devils; Providence Bruins; Norfolk Admirals; Toronto Marlies; Odessa Jackalopes
- NHL draft: Undrafted
- Playing career: 2002–2013

Michael Schutte (born July 28, 1979) is a Canadian former professional ice hockey player who last played for the Coventry Blaze of the Elite Ice Hockey League (EIHL).

== Playing career ==
After three seasons with the University of Maine, where he made the 2002 NCAA Division I Men's Ice Hockey All-Tournament Team, Schutte signed with the Phoenix Coyotes on May 23, 2002. He spent the next five seasons bouncing around various American Hockey League (AHL) and ECHL teams; namely, the Springfield Falcons, Lowell Lock Monsters, Houston Aeros, Dayton Bombers, Cincinnati Mighty Ducks, Trenton Titans, Providence Bruins, Norfolk Admirals and Toronto Marlies. He then spent three seasons with teams in Germany's DEL2, and then, after one season off, finished his career with one season each with the Odessa Jackalopes, HC Alleghe and, finally, the Coventry Blaze.

== Personal life ==
Schutte and his wife have two children - a daughter born in 2008, and a son born in 2012.

== Career statistics ==
			Regular season					Playoffs
Season	Team	League	GP	G	A	Pts	PIM	GP	G	A	Pts	PIM
1996–97	Bramalea Blues	OPJHL	40	4	8	12	36	—	—	—	—	—
1997–98	Bramalea Blues	OPJHL	34	7	18	25	40	—	—	—	—	—
1997–98	Burlington Cougars	OPJHL	14	8	7	15	10	—	—	—	—	—
1998–99	Burlington Cougars	OPJHL	48	26	44	70	38	—	—	—	—	—
1999–00	University of Maine	NCAA	23	2	7	9	14	—	—	—	—	—
2000–01	University of Maine	NCAA	38	15	10	25	20	—	—	—	—	—
2001–02	University of Maine	NCAA	39	13	18	31	31	—	—	—	—	—
2002–03	Springfield Falcons	AHL	48	5	11	16	27	—	—	—	—	—
2002–03	Lowell Lock Monsters	AHL	13	2	5	7	8	—	—	—	—	—
2003–04	Springfield Falcons	AHL	12	2	2	4	10	—	—	—	—	—
2003–04	Houston Aeros	AHL	36	3	0	3	20	1	0	1	1	0
2004–05	Dayton Bombers	ECHL	34	4	9	13	29	—	—	—	—	—
2004–05	Cincinnati Mighty Ducks	AHL	2	0	0	0	4	—	—	—	—	—
2004–05	Trenton Titans	ECHL	33	4	15	19	50	20	7	5	12	24
2005–06	Providence Bruins	AHL	69	4	25	29	90	—	—	—	—	—
2006–07	Norfolk Admirals	AHL	1	0	0	0	4	—	—	—	—	—
2006–07	Toronto Marlies	AHL	10	1	1	2	6	—	—	—	—	—
2006–07	Grizzly Adams Wolfsburg	Germany2	23	6	9	15	43	2	0	1	1	0
2007–08	Heilbronner Falken	Germany2	46	7	30	37	60	9	0	7	7	12
2008–09	SERC Wild Wings	Germany2	45	9	29	38	32	1	0	0	0	0
2009–10	EC Salzburg II	Austria2	26	10	34	44	64	5	0	7	7	4
2010–11	Odessa Jackalopes	CHL	18	1	4	5	15	—	—	—	—	—
2010–11	Wipptal Broncos	Italy2	7	1	5	6	10	17	2	16	18	10
2011–12	HC Alleghe	Italy	37	9	20	29	24	11	1	7	8	12
2012–13	Coventry Blaze	EIHL	50	10	39	49	36	4	0	2	2	2
AHL totals			191	17	44	61	169	1	0	1	1	0

== Awards and honours ==
Award	Year
All-NCAA All-Tournament Team	2002
EIHL First All-Star team	2012–13
