= Nicholas Angell =

American professional ice hockey player

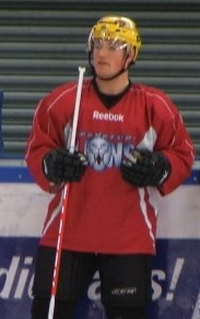
- Born: October 31, 1979 (age 46) Duluth, Minnesota, U.S.
- Height: 6 ft 0 in (183 cm)
- Weight: 195 lb (88 kg; 13 st 13 lb)
- Position: Defense
- Shoots: Right
- Allsvenskan team Former teams: VIK Västerås HK; Brynäs IF; HV71; Frankfurt Lions; Metallurg Novokuznetsk; Avangard Omsk
- NHL draft: Undrafted
- Playing career: 2002–present

Nicholas "Nick" Angell (born October 31, 1979) is an American professional ice hockey player. He is currently playing for the VIK Västerås HK of the Swedish HockeyAllsvenskan.

Angell is an offensive defenseman often joining the rush, acting as a fourth forward at times. Angell is a strong skater and plays a physical game. His slapshot is hard and accurate, used on the power play as a shooting threat.

== Early career ==
Angell began his ice hockey career playing in the Duluth youth leagues where he honed his skills before playing at Duluth East High School. During his senior year, Angell led the Duluth East Greyhounds in winning the 1998 Minnesota High School Boys Hockey tournament, and was nominated for the Mr. Hockey award, which is given to Minnesota's most valuable high school hockey player. He was then recruited to play for the University of Minnesota in the National Collegiate Athletic Association (NCAA) Division I, from 1998 to 2002, where he helped Minnesota win their fifth NCAA Men's Ice Hockey Championship in 2002.

== Professional career ==
Angell began his professional career in 2002–03, playing several games with the Milwaukee Admirals, the Nashville Predators' minor league affiliate in the AHL. He then spent the rest of the season with the Rockford Icehogs in the IHL, totaling 16 points in 73 games.

The next season (2003–04), Angell was signed by IFK Arboga, in the Swedish tier two league. During the 2004-05 season, he played for the Frisk Tigers in the Norwegian Elite League, before returning to the Swedish tier two league with Bofors IK, for the 2005-06 season. In 2006, Angell signed with the Swedish Elite League team Brynäs IF where he played for two seasons.

In 2007, Angell was selected to play for Team USA in the Deutschland Cup, where the United States finished in 2nd place after losing to Switzerland 3-2, in an overtime shootout. In 2008, he signed a one-year contract with the 2007–08 Swedish Elite League Champions HV71, after playing a few games for the Tampere Battle Axe, in Finland. Angell joined HV71 for the 2008–09 season, after briefly playing the beginning of the season with the Norwegian team Stavanger Oilers. After playing five seasons in Sweden, Angell moved to Germany for the 2009-10 season after signing with the Frankfurt Lions in the Deutsche Eishockey Liga.

In 2010, Angell played in the Kontinental Hockey League, after signing with Metallurg Novokuznetsk. With 18 points in 51 games, he ended up being the club's top-scoring defenseman, but as Metallurg lost all chances to make the playoffs, Nick was traded to Avangard Omsk just hours before the trade deadline on 31 January 2011. While playing for Metallurg in the KHL, Angell was the first American to be named captain of a Russian professional ice hockey team. Angell returned to the Deutsche Eishockey Liga for the 2011-12 season after signing with Eisbären Berlin.

After retiring for one year, Nicholas returned to Sweden in the all-svenskan league for Karlskrona Hockey Klub. Currently, Angell is playing for Västerås IK in all-svenskan.

== Awards ==
- Minnesota State High School Hockey Champion, in 1998.
- NCAA Men's Division I Ice Hockey Champion, in 2002.
- Most Points by Defenseman, Norwegian Elite League, 2004-2005.
- Most Points by Foreigner, Allsvenskan, 2005-2006

In 2008, Angell received 4% of the votes in an internet survey for the World's Sportsman of the Year. The survey was conducted by a Finnish newspaper, Ilta-Sanomat. Angell finished fourth together with Argentine footballer Lionel Messi and just ahead of Alexander Ovechkin, of the Washington Capitals.

== Career statistics ==
			Regular season					Playoffs
Season	Team	League	GP	G	A	Pts	PIM	GP	G	A	Pts	PIM
1998–99	U of Minnesota	WCHA	37	1	8	9	21	—	—	—	—	—
1999–00	U of Minnesota	WCHA	37	3	6	9	42	—	—	—	—	—
2000–01	U of Minnesota	WCHA	38	3	5	8	26	—	—	—	—	—
2001–02	U of Minnesota	WCHA	44	4	11	15	61	—	—	—	—	—
2002–03	Rockford Icehogs	UHL	73	6	10	16	92	3	0	1	1	8
2002–03	Milwaukee Admirals	AHL	2	0	0	0	2	—	—	—	—	—
2003–04	Arboga IK	Swe.1	41	10	14	24	125	—	—	—	—	—
2004–05	Frisk Tigers	GET	41	17	15	32	131	4	2	2	4	0
2005–06	Bofors IK	Swe.1	40	18	24	42	62	10	5	2	7	8
2006–07	Brynäs IF	SEL	49	14	13	27	62	7	1	4	5	35
2007–08	Tappara	SM-liiga	13	0	1	1	22	—	—	—	—	—
2007–08	Brynäs IF	SEL	42	6	13	19	42	10	1	3	4	12
2008–09	Stavanger Oilers	GET	4	1	0	1	2	—	—	—	—	—
2008–09	HV71	SEL	40	4	8	12	34	18	2	5	5	16
2009–10	Frankfurt Lions	DEL	56	13	14	27	74	4	0	2	2	6
2010–11	Metallurg Novokuznetsk	KHL	51	8	10	18	58	—	—	—	—	—
2010–11	Avangard Omsk	KHL	5	0	1	1	9	12	1	0	1	2
2011–12	Eisbären Berlin	DEL	46	5	8	13	66	13	0	5	5	12
SEL totals			131	24	34	58	138	35	4	12	16	63
KHL totals			56	8	11	19	67	12	1	0	1	2
DEL totals			102	18	22	40	140	17	0	7	7	18
