= Matthew Yeats =

Canadian ice hockey player

- Born: April 6, 1979 (age 47) Innisfail, Alberta, Canada
- Height: 6 ft 0 in (183 cm)
- Weight: 190 lb (86 kg; 13 st 8 lb)
- Position: Goaltender
- Caught: Right
- Played for: Washington Capitals; Sparta Sarpsborg; Herlev Hornets; HK Acroni Jesenice
- NHL draft: 248th overall, 1998; Los Angeles Kings
- Playing career: 2002–2009

Matthew Yeats (born April 6, 1979) is a Canadian former professional ice hockey goaltender. He played five games in the National Hockey League (NHL) with the Washington Capitals during the 2003–04 season. The rest of his career, which lasted from 2002 to 2009, was spent in the minor leagues and then in Europe.

== Playing career ==
Originally drafted by the Los Angeles Kings in the 1998 NHL entry draft, Yeats was signed in 2003 as a free agent by the Portland Pirates, and then later the Washington Capitals, he played five games for the Capitals near the end of the 2003–04 season.

The Norwegian team Sparta Warriors in Sarpsborg announced Yeats as their new goalie for the 2007–08 season in the Get League on April 28, 2007. He left the team from Sarpsborg on 28 October 2008 and moved to Herlev Hornets. He left after 3 months Denmark and joined on 1 February 2009 to Slovenian club HK Acroni Jesenice of the Erste Bank Hockey League. He left the team after the end of season.

== Career statistics ==
=== Regular season and playoffs ===
			Regular season										Playoffs
Season	Team	League	GP	W	L	T	OTL	MIN	GA	SO	GAA	SV%	GP	W	L	MIN	GA	SO	GAA	SV%
1995–96	Lethbridge Hurricanes	WHL	1	0	0	0	—	20	3	0	9.00	.750	—	—	—	—	—	—	—	—
1996–97	Olds Grizzlys	AJHL	32	—	—	—	—	1678	95	1	3.41	—	—	—	—	—	—	—	—	—
1997–98	Olds Grizzlys	AJHL	26	12	12	1	—	1498	96	0	3.85	—	—	—	—	—	—	—	—	—
1999–00	University of Maine	HE	32	20	6	4	—	1821	79	0	2.60	.911	—	—	—	—	—	—	—	—
2000–01	University of Maine	HE	33	18	9	4	—	1897	76	2	2.40	.897	—	—	—	—	—	—	—	—
2001–02	University of Maine	HE	20	6	8	3	—	1048	54	0	3.09	.887	—	—	—	—	—	—	—	—
2002–03	Philadelphia Phantoms	AHL	2	1	1	0	—	90	4	0	2.67	.902	—	—	—	—	—	—	—	—
2002–03	Atlantic City Boardwalk Bullies	ECHL	48	23	16	8	—	2811	141	4	3.01	.896	8	4	1	397	16	1	2.42	.896
2003–04	Washington Capitals	NHL	5	1	3	0	—	258	13	0	3.03	.908	—	—	—	—	—	—	—	—
2003–04	Portland Pirates	AHL	7	2	1	1	—	332	12	1	2.17	.928	—	—	—	—	—	—	—	—
2004–05	Reading Royals	ECHL	13	8	2	2	—	780	31	1	2.38	.918	—	—	—	—	—	—	—	—
2004–05	Idaho Steelheads	ECHL	4	2	1	1	—	247	9	0	2.19	.913	2	0	1	66	3	0	2.72	.864
2005–06	Idaho Steelheads	ECHL	35	21	7	—	5	1980	98	1	2.97	.895	5	2	3	289	16	1	3.33	.901
2006–07	Texas Wildcatters	ECHL	60	32	19	—	7	3342	165	6	2.96	.910	6	2	4	287	16	1	3.35	.902
2007–08	Sparta Sarpsborg	NOR	41	—	—	—	—	3080	100	4	1.95	.913	6	—	—	—	—	—	2.95	.903
2008–09	Herlev Hornets	DEN	36	—	—	—	—	1944	143	0	4.41	.889	5	—	—	—	—	—	3.84	.901
2008–09	HK Acroni Jesenice	EBEL	2	—	—	—	—	—	—	0	4.00	.833	2	—	—	—	—	—	2.37	.934
NHL totals			5	1	3	0	—	258	13	0	3.03	.908	—	—	—	—	—	—	—	—
