= Adam Hauser =

American ice hockey player (born 1980)

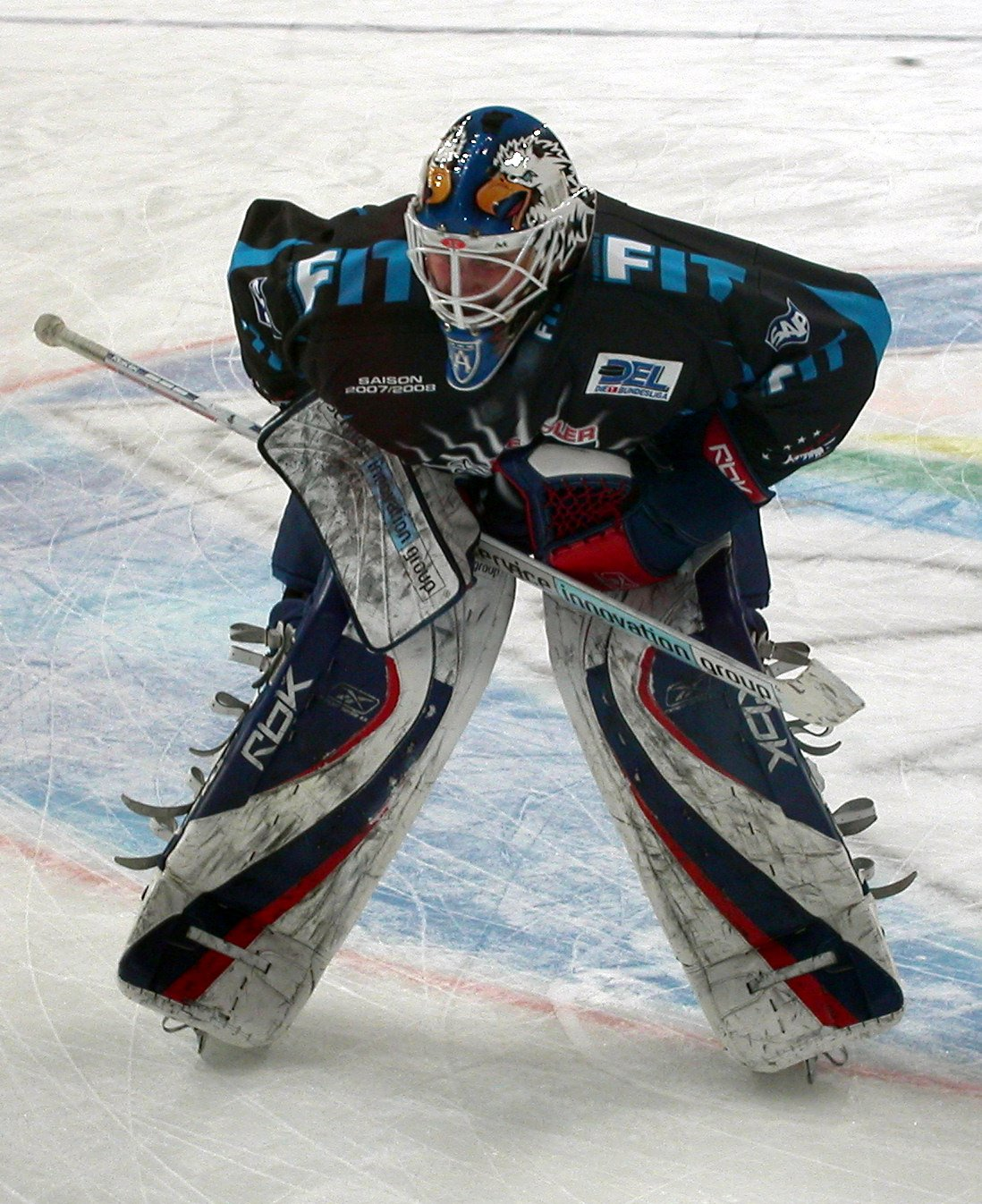
- Born: May 27, 1980 (age 45) Bovey, Minnesota
- Height: 6 ft 2 in (188 cm)
- Weight: 194 lb (88 kg; 13 st 12 lb)
- Position: Goaltender
- Caught: Left
- Played for: Vienna Capitals; Kassel Huskies; Adler Mannheim; Kölner Haie; Los Angeles Kings
- NHL draft: 81st overall, 1999; Edmonton Oilers
- Playing career: 2002–2012

Adam Aaron Hauser (born May 27, 1980) is an American former ice hockey goaltender. He played one game in the National Hockey League with the Los Angeles Kings during the 2005–06 season. The rest of his career, which lasted from 2002 to 2012, was spent in the minor leagues and then in the Deutsche Eishockey Liga.

== Playing career ==
Hauser played his college career at the University of Minnesota, culminating his college career with an NCAA Division I National Championship in 2002. He finished his career with 83 wins, which was a WCHA record. Hauser is the Minnesota career leader in games played, and saves.

Initially selected by the Edmonton Oilers, 81st overall, in the 1999 NHL entry draft. Hauser signed as a free agent with the Los Angeles Kings' organization prior to the 2004–05 season. In the year, Hauser set several records for the Kings' AHL affiliate, the Manchester Monarchs. These records included best GAA (1.93), best save percentage (.933), and most shutouts (12). In his third year within the Kings' organization he made his NHL debut, and only game, on January 14, 2006, against the Buffalo Sabres.

Hauser then left for Europe the following season and has played with Kölner Haie, Adler Mannheim and the Kassel Huskies in the Deutsche Eishockey Liga.

After the Huskies folded prior to the 2010–11 season, Hauser joined the neighboring Austrian Hockey League, signing a try-out contract with the Vienna Capitals on September 16, 2010.

== Career statistics ==
=== Regular season and playoffs ===
| | | | Regular season | | | | | | | | | | Playoffs |
| Season | Team | League | GP | W | L | T | OTL | MIN | GA | SO | GAA | SV% | GP | W | L | MIN | GA | SO | GAA | SV% |
|---|---|---|---|---|---|---|---|---|---|---|---|---|---|---|---|---|---|---|---|---|
| 1997–98 | U.S. National Development Team | USDP | 37 | 18 | 10 | 4 | — | 2110 | 94 | 3 | 2.67 | — | 1 | 1 | 0 | 60 | 0 | 1 | 0.00 | 1.000 |
| 1998–99 | University of Minnesota | WCHA | 40 | 14 | 18 | 8 | — | 2350 | 136 | 3 | 3.47 | .876 | — | — | — | — | — | — | — | — |
| 1999–00 | University of Minnesota | WCHA | 36 | 20 | 14 | 2 | — | 2114 | 104 | 1 | 2.95 | .909 | — | — | — | — | — | — | — | — |
| 2000–01 | University of Minnesota | WCHA | 40 | 26 | 12 | 2 | — | 2366 | 101 | 3 | 2.56 | .902 | — | — | — | — | — | — | — | — |
| 2001–02 | University of Minnesota | WCHA | 35 | 23 | 6 | 4 | — | 2003 | 80 | 1 | 2.40 | .913 | — | — | — | — | — | — | — | — |
| 2002–03 | Providence Bruins | AHL | 1 | 0 | 0 | 1 | — | 64 | 3 | 0 | 2.78 | .917 | — | — | — | — | — | — | — | — |
| 2002–03 | Jackson Bandits | ECHL | 34 | 20 | 9 | 4 | — | 2021 | 83 | 5 | 2.46 | .916 | — | — | — | — | — | — | — | — |
| 2003–04 | Reading Royals | ECHL | 4 | 3 | 0 | 1 | — | 245 | 7 | 1 | 1.71 | .930 | — | — | — | — | — | — | — | — |
| 2003–04 | Manchester Monarchs | AHL | 43 | 20 | 15 | 7 | — | 2536 | 82 | 7 | 1.94 | .926 | 4 | 2 | 2 | 286 | 9 | 2 | 1.89 | .914 |
| 2004–05 | Manchester Monarchs | AHL | 32 | 19 | 11 | 0 | — | 1867 | 60 | 5 | 1.93 | .933 | 2 | 0 | 0 | 70 | 2 | 0 | 1.71 | .905 |
| 2005–06 | Manchester Monarchs | AHL | 45 | 22 | 17 | — | 2 | 2600 | 111 | 3 | 2.56 | .919 | 3 | 1 | 2 | 177 | 9 | 0 | 3.05 | .913 |
| 2005–06 | Los Angeles Kings | NHL | 1 | 0 | 0 | — | 0 | 51 | 6 | 0 | 7.06 | .750 | — | — | — | — | — | — | — | — |
| 2006–07 | Kölner Haie | DEL | 40 | — | — | — | — | 2427 | 95 | 4 | 2.35 | .924 | 9 | 4 | 5 | 554 | 29 | 1 | 3.14 | .895 |
| 2007–08 | Adler Mannheim | DEL | 51 | 31 | 19 | — | 0 | 2950 | 141 | 1 | 2.87 | .911 | 4 | 1 | 3 | 351 | 14 | 0 | 2.39 | .918 |
| 2008–09 | Kassel Huskies | DEL | 38 | 12 | 15 | — | 0 | 2267 | 113 | 0 | 2.99 | .910 | — | — | — | — | — | — | — | — |
| 2009–10 | Kassel Huskies | DEL | 51 | 17 | 34 | — | 0 | 2910 | 177 | 1 | 3.65 | .903 | — | — | — | — | — | — | — | — |
| 2010–11 | Vienna Capitals | EBEL | 24 | 14 | 10 | — | 0 | 1425 | 64 | 3 | 2.69 | .914 | 6 | 2 | 2 | — | — | 0 | 2.68 | .924 |
| 2011–12 | Bietigheim Steelers | GER-2 | 1 | 0 | 1 | — | 0 | 60 | 5 | 0 | 5.00 | — | — | — | — | — | — | — | — | — |
| DEL totals | | | 180 | — | — | — | — | 10,554 | 526 | 6 | 2.99 | — | 13 | 5 | 8 | 905 | 43 | 1 | 2.85 | — |
| NHL totals | | | 1 | 0 | 0 | — | 0 | 51 | 6 | 0 | 7.06 | .750 | — | — | — | — | — | — | — | — |

== Awards and honors ==
| Award | Year |
|---|---|
| All-WCHA Third Team | 2000–01 |
| All-NCAA All-Tournament Team | 2002 |
