= Róbert Liščák =

Slovak ice hockey player

- Born: April 4, 1978 (age 48) Skalica, Czechoslovakia
- Height: 6 ft 0 in (183 cm)
- Weight: 194 lb (88 kg; 13 st 12 lb)
- Position: Center
- Shot: Left
- Played for: HK 36 Skalica; Providence Bruins; Augusta Lynx; Trenton Titans; HC Slovan Ustecti Lvi; HC Slovan Bratislava; HC Kometa Brno; HKM Zvolen; MsHK Zilina; HC Dukla Senica; HC Banska Bystrica; Nottingham Panthers
- NHL draft: Undrafted
- Playing career: 1995–2011

Róbert Liščák (born 4 April 1978) is a Slovak professional ice hockey player who played with HC Slovan Bratislava in the Slovak Extraliga.

== Career statistics ==
			Regular season					Playoffs
Season	Team	League	GP	G	A	Pts	PIM	GP	G	A	Pts	PIM
1995–96	HK Skalica U20	Slovak U20	49	26	21	47	26	—	—	—	—	—
1995–96	HK 36 Skalica	Slovak2	3	0	0	0	0	—	—	—	—	—
1996–97	Nipawin Hawks	SJHL	—	—	—	—	—	—	—	—	—	—
1997–98	Nipawin Hawks	SJHL	63	27	50	77	39	—	—	—	—	—
1998–99	Nipawin Hawks	SJHL	54	27	40	67	93	—	—	—	—	—
1999–00	University of Maine	NCAA	27	6	7	13	32	—	—	—	—	—
2000–01	University of Maine	NCAA	39	11	9	20	36	—	—	—	—	—
2001–02	University of Maine	NCAA	44	17	20	37	32	—	—	—	—	—
2002–03	University of Maine	NCAA	39	12	22	34	42	—	—	—	—	—
2002–03	Providence Bruins	AHL	—	—	—	—	—	1	0	0	0	0
2003–04	Providence Bruins	AHL	28	0	4	4	12	—	—	—	—	—
2003–04	Augusta Lynx	ECHL	12	0	4	4	10	—	—	—	—	—
2003–04	Trenton Titans	ECHL	18	5	6	11	23	—	—	—	—	—
2004–05	HK 36 Skalica	Slovak	51	8	11	19	34	—	—	—	—	—
2005–06	HK 36 Skalica	Slovak	51	9	12	21	74	7	2	1	3	6
2006–07	HK 36 Skalica	Slovak	40	16	24	40	111	—	—	—	—	—
2006–07	HC Slovan Ustecti Lvi	Czech2	13	4	3	7	12	12	4	8	12	32
2007–08	HC Slovan Ustecti Lvi	Czech	15	1	1	2	20	—	—	—	—	—
2007–08	HK 36 Skalica	Slovak	32	8	12	20	36	13	3	7	10	6
2008–09	HC Slovan Bratislava	Slovak	27	6	2	8	66	—	—	—	—	—
2008–09	HC Kometa Brno	Czech2	17	3	6	9	10	8	1	3	4	6
2009–10	HKM Zvolen	Slovak	7	0	2	2	6	—	—	—	—	—
2009–10	MsHK Zilina	Slovak	7	0	4	4	0	—	—	—	—	—
2009–10	HK 36 Skalica	Slovak	7	0	1	1	0	—	—	—	—	—
2009–10	HC Dukla Senica	Slovak2	1	0	2	2	0	—	—	—	—	—
2009–10	HC Banska Bystrica	Slovak	31	1	11	12	10	5	0	0	0	2
2010–11	Nottingham Panthers	EIHL	3	0	1	1	4	—	—	—	—	—
2010–11	HC Dukla Senica	Slovak2	16	3	7	10	18	—	—	—	—	—
Slovak totals			253	48	79	127	337	25	5	8	13	14

== Awards and honors ==
Award	Year
All-NCAA All-Tournament Team	2002
