= Grant Potulny =

American ice hockey player and coach

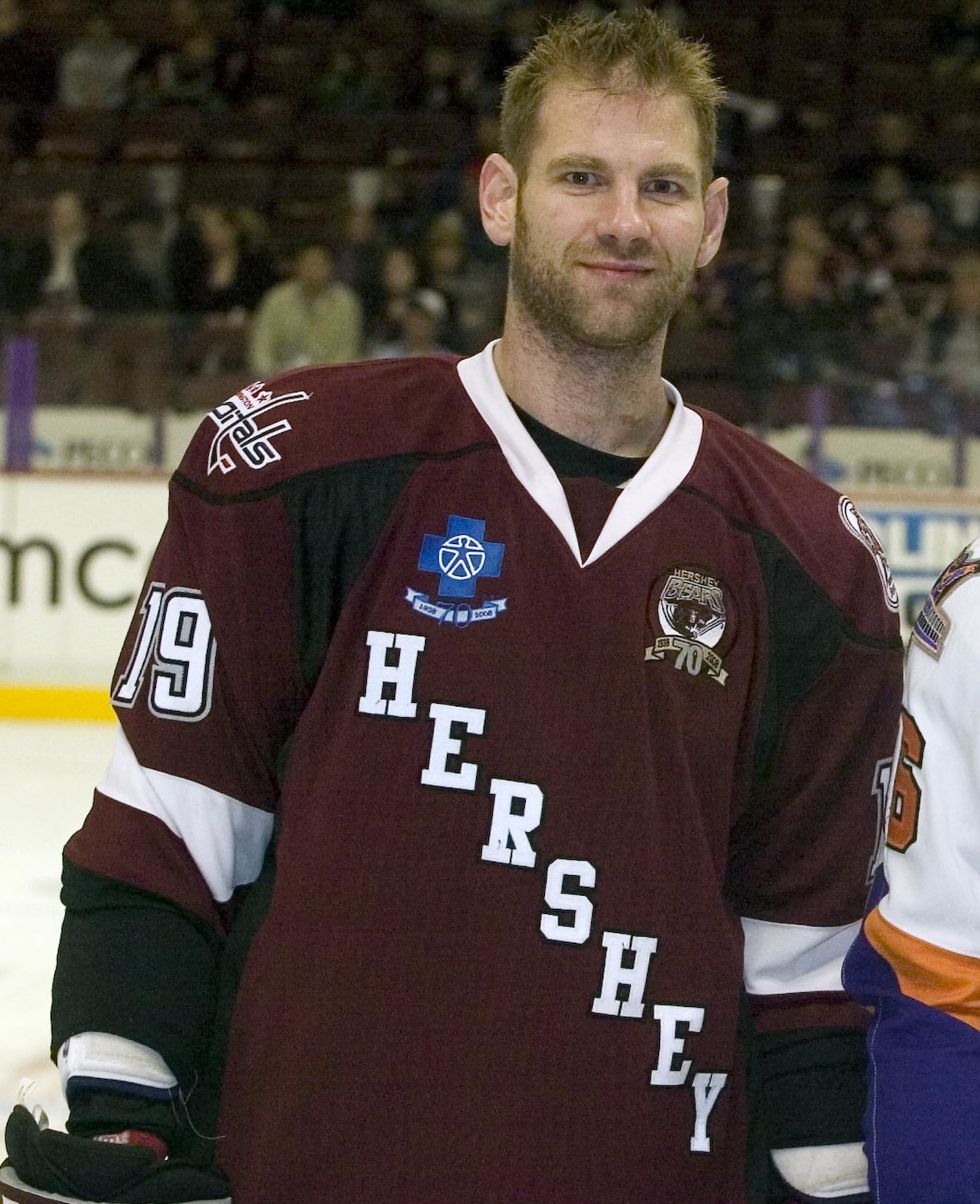
- Potulny with the Hershey Bears in 2007
- Born: March 4, 1980 (age 46) Grand Forks, North Dakota, U.S.
- Height: 6 ft 3 in (191 cm)
- Weight: 205 lb (93 kg; 14 st 9 lb)
- Position: Centre
- Shot: Left
- NHL draft: 157th overall, 2000; Ottawa Senators
- Playing career: 2004–2009 Coaching career

Biographical details
- Education: Minnesota

Playing career
- 1998–2000: Lincoln Stars
- 2000–2004: Minnesota
- 2004–2007: Binghamton Senators
- 2007–2008: Hershey Bears
- 2007–2008: Springfield Falcons
- 2008–2009: San Antonio Rampage
- 2008–2009: Norfolk Admirals
- 2008–2009: Füchse Duisburg
- Position: Center

Coaching career (HC unless noted)
- 2009–2017: Minnesota (Assistant)
- 2013: USA U20 (Assistant)
- 2017: USA U20 (Assistant)
- 2017–2024: Northern Michigan
- 2018: USA U20 (Assistant)
- 2024–2026: Hartford Wolf Pack

Head coaching record
- Overall: 128–113–17 (.529)
- Tournaments: 0–0 (–)

Grant Martin Potulny (born March 4, 1980) is an American former professional ice hockey player and coach who is most recently served as the head coach of the Hartford Wolf Pack of the American Hockey League. He was previously the head coach of the Northern Michigan Wildcats men's ice hockey team from 2017 to 2024. Potulny was selected by the Ottawa Senators in the 5th round (157th overall) of the 2000 NHL entry draft.

== Playing career ==
Potulny played two seasons in the United States Hockey League with the Lincoln Stars, leading his team to win the 1999–2000 Anderson Cup as the team's Most Valuable Player. Potulny then attended the University of Minnesota where he was a three-year captain with the Minnesota Golden Gophers during his college career.

Immediately following his graduation, Potulny turned professional with the Binghamton Senators playing in their final few regular season games and playoff of the 2003–04 AHL season. He also played in the AHL for the Hershey Bears, Springfield Falcons, San Antonio Rampage and Norfolk Admirals. He also played in the Deutsche Eishockey Liga in Germany for Füchse Duisburg. He retired from professional hockey following the 2008–09 AHL season.

== Coaching career ==
In July 2009, Potulny was promoted to full-time assistant coach of the Minnesota Golden Gophers Men's ice hockey team prior to the 2009–10 season.

Prior to the 2013 World Junior Ice Hockey Championships Potulny was named an assistant head coach for Team USA, working alongside Mark Osiecki and Phil Housley. He was again named an assistant coach for Team USA for the 2018 World Junior Ice Hockey Championships.

On April 18, 2017, it was announced that Potulny was selected to be the new head coach at Northern Michigan University. In his first year as head coach, Potulny was named the WCHA Coach of the Year. He had led the Northern Michigan Wildcats to a 19-7-2-2 record. ranking second place in the conference. On March 29, 2018, Potulny signed an eight-year employment agreement with Northern Michigan.

After 7 seasons, Potulny stepped down as Northern Michigan head coach on June 11, 2024. He was named head coach of the Hartford Wolf Pack on June 27, 2024.

On May 3, 2026 coaches Grant Potulny, Jamie Tardif, and Paul Mara were all relieved of their duties with the Hartford Wolf Pack.

== Personal life ==
He is the older brother of Ryan Potulny, who played in the NHL for the Philadelphia Flyers, Edmonton Oilers, Chicago Blackhawks and Ottawa Senators. He is also a first-cousin to Paul Gaustad.

== Head coaching record ==
Record table
Season	Team	Overall	Conference	Standing	Postseason
Northern Michigan Wildcats (WCHA) (2017–2021)
2017–18	Northern Michigan	25–15–3	19–7–2	2nd	WCHA Runner-up
2018–19	Northern Michigan	21–16–2	18–8–2	2nd	WCHA Semifinals
2019–20	Northern Michigan	18–16–4	16–11–1–1	3rd	WCHA Quarterfinals
2020–21	Northern Michigan	11–17–1	6–7–1	T–5th	WCHA Runner-up
Northern Michigan:		75–64–10	59–33–6		
Northern Michigan Wildcats (CCHA) (2021–present)
2021–22	Northern Michigan	20–16–1	12–13–1	5th	CCHA Semifinals
2022–23	Northern Michigan	21–17–0	14–12–0	T–4th	CCHA Runner-Up
2023–24	Northern Michigan	12–16–6	10–10–4	5th	CCHA Quarterfinals
Northern Michigan:		53–49–7	36–35–5		
Total:		128–113–17			
National champion Postseason invitational champion Conference regular season champion Conference regular season and conference tournament champion Division regular season champion Division regular season and conference tournament champion Conference tournament champion

== Awards and honors ==
Award	Year
College
All-WCHA Rookie Team	2000–01
All-NCAA All-Tournament Team	2002
WCHA All-Tournament Team	2003

== Career statistics ==
			Regular season					Playoffs
Season	Team	League	GP	G	A	Pts	PIM	GP	G	A	Pts	PIM
1996–97	Red River High School	HSND
1997–98	Red River High School	HSND
1998–99	Lincoln Stars	USHL	46	7	11	18	76	10	2	1	3	7
1999–2000	Lincoln Stars	USHL	56	25	30	55	85	10	3	4	7	4
2000–01	University of Minnesota	WCHA	42	22	11	33	38	—	—	—	—	—
2001–02	University of Minnesota	WCHA	43	15	19	34	38	—	—	—	—	—
2002–03	University of Minnesota	WCHA	23	15	8	23	12	—	—	—	—	—
2003–04	University of Minnesota	WCHA	38	16	10	26	28	—	—	—	—	—
2003–04	Binghamton Senators	AHL	3	0	1	1	0	2	0	0	0	0
2004–05	Binghamton Senators	AHL	50	4	6	10	104	6	0	0	0	2
2005–06	Binghamton Senators	AHL	78	23	23	46	122	—	—	—	—	—
2006–07	Binghamton Senators	AHL	47	10	10	20	85	—	—	—	—	—
2007–08	Hershey Bears	AHL	50	19	12	31	71	—	—	—	—	—
2007–08	Springfield Falcons	AHL	25	9	6	15	33	—	—	—	—	—
2008–09	Füchse Duisburg	DEL	7	1	0	1	8	—	—	—	—	—
2008–09	San Antonio Rampage	AHL	7	0	1	1	10	—	—	—	—	—
2008–09	Norfolk Admirals	AHL	37	8	13	21	50	—	—	—	—	—
AHL totals			297	73	72	145	475	8	0	0	0	2

Awards and achievements
Preceded by Chuck Kobasew	NCAA Tournament Most Outstanding Player; 2002	Succeeded by Thomas Vanek
Preceded by Wade Dubielewicz	WCHA Most Valuable Player in Tournament; 2003	Succeeded by Kellen Briggs
Preceded by Tom Serratore	WCHA Coach of the Year; 2017–18	Succeeded by Mike Hastings
