= 2002–03 Minnesota Golden Gophers men's ice hockey season =

NCAA Division I National Champion Dodge Holiday Classic, Champion WCHA Tournament, Champion NCAA Tournament, Champion
- Conference: T-2nd WCHA
- Home ice: Mariucci Arena

Rankings
- USA Today/AHCA: 2
- USCHO.com: 2

Record
- Overall: 28–8–9
- Conference: 15–6–7
- Home: 14–4–6
- Road: 9–4–3
- Neutral: 5–0–0

Coaches and captains
- Head coach: Don Lucia
- Assistant coaches: Mike Guentzel; Bob Motzko; Robb Stauber
- Captain: Grant Potulny
- Alternate captain(s): Paul Martin; Nick Anthony

The 2002–03 Minnesota Golden Gophers men's ice hockey season was the 82nd season of play for the program and its 44th season in the Western Collegiate Hockey Association (WCHA). Representing the University of Minnesota, the Golden Gophers played home games at Mariucci Arena. Led by Don Lucia in his fourth season as head coach, the Gophers successfully defended their NCAA Division I men's ice hockey national championship. The Gophers finished the season with a 28–8–9 record, closing out the year without suffering consecutive losses at any point in the season.

== Season ==
Following the 2001–2002 season, players Jordan Leopold, John Pohl, and Jeff Taffe did not return. Thomas Vanek made his college debut in this season.

The Gophers were ranked first entering the season, but the team lost team captain Grant Potulny to an injury in the season opener against Ohio State. What was initially thought to be a fractured fibula turned out to include torn ligaments as well, leaving him out for months. In addition to Potulny's injury, starting goaltenders Travis Weber and Justin Johnson both struggled to find success early in the season. This goalie rotation continued through the Colorado College game, after which Weber was named the primary starter and achieved a road victory against the University of Wisconsin.

Although goaltending and offensive play improved as the season continued, the Gophers' record remained inconsistent. In December, the team ranked 10th in the league. Following victories over Yale and Boston College, they briefly ascended to 4th in January before dropping down to 7th.

The second half of the season started with three losses, with the first win coming against North Dakota. Entering the final few weeks of the season, Minnesota sat 7th in the polls, with their next four games against higher-ranked teams. Minnesota went 2–0–2 in those games, and finished the regular season tied for second in the WCHA standings.

=== Conference tournament ===
Because they held the tie-breaker, the Gophers received the No. 2 seed for the WCHA tournament, playing against Michigan Tech. The Gophers won the first game, but Weber suffered an injury to his finger in the second. Johnson entered for the remainder of the contest. Though he was initially expected to be ready for the next game, Weber was unable to play against Minnesota State–Mankato. Minnesota outshot MSU 49–17. Just less than four minutes into the extra session, Vanek scored his 26th goal of the season and sent the Gophers to the championship game.

Colorado College entered the game as the higher-ranked seed. Potulny played a part in all three of Minnesota's goals in the first period to build a significant lead. The Tigers had two power play goals in the second half of the game, along with 38 shots. The Gophers won 4–2.

=== NCAA tournament ===
Because the team hosted one of the four regionals, Minnesota was placed in the West bracket. The WCHA championship allowed Minnesota to earn one of the #1 seeds and an advantageous match for the first round. Additionally, because two of the teams seeded 4th were also members of the WCHA, Minnesota was assigned to play Mercyhurst. With Weber returning and Potulny scoring a hat-trick, Minnesota claimed a 9–2 victory.

Minnesota's second game was expected to be closer than the previous games, as they were taking on #6 Ferris State. The Bulldogs were led by Hobey Baker finalist Chris Kunitz who scored twice in the first period. Minnesota then scored five times in the first period en route to a 7–4 victory.

The national semifinal saw Minnesota recover from an early deficit. Facing #4 Michigan, the Gophers were outplayed in the first period and down by a goal. Jed Ortmeyer scored after the midway point of the game, giving the Wolverines a two-goal lead. Troy Riddle cut the lead in half on a rebound from Vanek before the end of the second, while a goal less than two minutes into the third from Gino Guyer tied the score. Chris Harrington took two separate minor penalties afterwards, but the team was able to keep the game tied at 2–all. In overtime, both teams were unsuccessful on offense. In almost nine minutes, only five shots were taken, but eventually Vanek scored, sending the Gophers to the championship game.

The final game of the year was a rematch: Minnesota against New Hampshire. Minnesota generated sustained offensive pressure, but Wildcats player Mike Ayers kept the game close. After two periods, Minnesota led in shots 30–16, but the teams remained tied with one goal each. Just past the 8-minute mark, Vanek scored and then assisted on a second goal just three minutes later. After a power play goal from Barry Tallackson, Minnesota had a 3-goal lead. New Hampshire pulled its goaltender, and the Gophers scored their fifth goal, winning the national championship.

== Departures ==
Player	Position	Nationality	Cause
Nick Angell	Defenseman	United States	Graduation (signed with Milwaukee Admirals)
Adam Hauser	Goaltender	United States	Graduation (signed with Providence Bruins)
Jordan Leopold	Defenseman	United States	Graduation (signed with Calgary Flames)
Mark Nenovich	Defenseman	United States	Graduation (retired)
Pat O'Leary	Forward	United States	Graduation (signed with Quad City Mallards)
John Pohl	Forward	United States	Graduation (signed with St. Louis Blues)
Jeff Taffe	Forward	United States	Graduation (signed with Phoenix Coyotes)
Erik Wendell	Forward	United States	Graduation (signed with Rockford IceHogs)

== Recruiting ==
Player	Position	Nationality	Age	Notes
P. J. Atherton	Defenseman	United States	20	Edina, MN; selected 170th overall in 2002
Gino Guyer	Forward	United States	18	Coleraine, MN
Chris Harrington	Forward	United States	20	St. Cloud, MN
Tyler Hirsch	Forward	United States	18	Bloomington, MN
Peter Kennedy	Defenseman	Canada	18	Brookfield, NS
Andy Sertich	Defenseman	United States	19	Coleraine, MN; selected 136th overall in 2002
Dustin Smieja	Goaltender	United States	18	Saint Paul, MN
Thomas Vanek	Forward	Austria	18	Baden bei Wien, AUT

== Roster ==
April 15, 2003.

No.	Nat.	Player	Class	Pos	Height	Weight	DoB	Hometown	Previous team	NHL rights
2		Peter Kennedy	Freshman	D	6' 2" (1.88 m)	194 lb (88 kg)	1984-05-24	Brookfield, Nova Scotia	Ottawa Jr. Senators (CJHL)	—
3		Chris Harrington	Freshman	D	6' 0" (1.83 m)	183 lb (83 kg)	1982-05-07	St. Cloud, Minnesota	Omaha Lancers (USHL)	—
4		P. J. Atherton	Freshman	D	6' 2" (1.88 m)	190 lb (86 kg)	1982-08-16	Edina, Minnesota	Cedar Rapids Roughriders (USHL)	TBL, 170th overall 2002
5		Jon Waibel	Junior	F	5' 11" (1.8 m)	190 lb (86 kg)	1982-05-19	Baudette, Minnesota	USNTDP (USHL)	ANA, 153rd overall 2000
6		Judd Stevens	Sophomore	D	6' 2" (1.88 m)	203 lb (92 kg)	1983-04-09	Wayzata, Minnesota	Green Bay Gamblers (USHL)	—
7		Gino Guyer	Freshman	F	5' 11" (1.8 m)	192 lb (87 kg)	1983-10-14	Coleraine, Minnesota	Lincoln Stars (USHL)	—
9		Andy Sertich	Freshman	D	6' 0" (1.83 m)	183 lb (83 kg)	1983-05-06	Coleraine, Minnesota	Sioux Falls Stampede (USHL)	PIT, 136th overall 2002
10		Paul Martin (A)	Junior	D	6' 1" (1.85 m)	200 lb (91 kg)	1981-06-20	Minneapolis, Minnesota	Elk River High School (MN-HS)	NJD, 62nd overall 2000
11		Dan Welch	Junior	F	5' 11" (1.8 m)	181 lb (82 kg)	1981-02-23	Hastings, Minnesota	Omaha Lancers (USHL)	LAK, 193rd overall 2000
13		Keith Ballard	Sophomore	D	5' 11" (1.8 m)	199 lb (90 kg)	1982-11-26	Baudette, Minnesota	Omaha Lancers (USHL)	BUF, 11th overall 2002
14		Chad Roberg	Junior	F	5' 11" (1.8 m)	174 lb (79 kg)	1980-10-25	Duluth, Minnesota	East High School (MN-HS)	—
15		Mike Erickson	Sophomore	F	6' 3" (1.91 m)	200 lb (91 kg)	1983-04-12	Elk River, Minnesota	Des Moines Buccaneers (USHL)	—
16		Nick Anthony (A)	Senior	F	5' 0" (1.52 m)	181 lb (82 kg)	1979-01-30	Faribault, Minnesota	Twin City Vulcans (USHL)	—
17		Garrett Smaagaard	Sophomore	F	5' 11" (1.8 m)	188 lb (85 kg)	1982-08-13	Eden Prairie, Minnesota	Eden Prairie High School (MN-HS)	—
18		Grant Potulny (C)	Junior	F	6' 3" (1.91 m)	204 lb (93 kg)	1980-03-04	Grand Forks, North Dakota	Lincoln Stars (USHL)	OTT, 157th overall 2000
19		Matt DeMarchi	Senior	D	6' 2" (1.88 m)	205 lb (93 kg)	1981-05-04	Bemidji, Minnesota	North Iowa Huskies (USHL)	NJD, 57th overall 2000
20		Joey Martin	Junior	D	6' 3" (1.91 m)	203 lb (92 kg)	1981-07-17	Buffalo, Minnesota	Omaha Lancers (USHL)	CHI, 193rd overall 2000
21		Troy Riddle	Junior	F	5' 10" (1.78 m)	175 lb (79 kg)	1981-08-24	Minneapolis, Minnesota	Des Moines Buccaneers (USHL)	STL, 129th overall 2000
23		Tyler Hirsch	Freshman	F	5' 9" (1.75 m)	174 lb (79 kg)	1984-01-04	Bloomington, Minnesota	Shattuck-Saint Mary's (MSHSL)	—
24		Matt Koalska	Sophomore	F	6' 0" (1.83 m)	205 lb (93 kg)	1980-05-16	Saint Paul, Minnesota	Twin City Vulcans (USHL)	NSH, 154th overall 2000
25		Jerrid Reinholz	Sophomore (RS)	F	6' 2" (1.88 m)	189 lb (86 kg)	1979-07-15	Ramsey, Minnesota	Minnesota–Duluth (WCHA)	—
26		Thomas Vanek	Freshman	F	6' 2" (1.88 m)	214 lb (97 kg)	1984-01-19	Baden bei Wien, Austria	Sioux Falls Stampede (USHL)	—
27		Barry Tallackson	Sophomore	F	6' 5" (1.96 m)	210 lb (95 kg)	1983-04-14	Grafton, North Dakota	USNTDP (USHL)	NJD, 53rd overall 2002
28		Brett MacKinnon	Sophomore	F	5' 11" (1.8 m)	190 lb (86 kg)	1981-01-02	Wayzata, Minnesota	Cedar Rapids RoughRiders (USHL)	—
29		Jake Fleming	Sophomore	F	5' 9" (1.75 m)	166 lb (75 kg)	1982-08-28	Osseo, Minnesota	Omaha Lancers (USHL)	—
31		Travis Weber	Sophomore	G	5' 11" (1.8 m)	205 lb (93 kg)	1983-05-26	Hibbing, Minnesota	USNTDP (USHL)	—
32		Dustin Smieja	Freshman	G	6' 4" (1.93 m)	192 lb (87 kg)	1984-07-14	Saint Paul, Minnesota		—
33		Justin Johnson	Sophomore	G	5' 10" (1.78 m)	183 lb (83 kg)	1980-09-22	Ham Lake, Minnesota	Lincoln Stars (USHL)	—

== Season standings ==
Note: PTS = Points; GP = Games played; W = Wins; L = Losses; T = Ties; GF = Goals for; GA = Goals against

2002–03 Western Collegiate Hockey Association standings
	Conference							Overall					
	GP	W	L	T	PTS	GF	GA	GP	W	L	T	GF	GA
#5 Colorado College†	28	19	4	5	43	125	70	42	30	7	5	190	103
#2 Minnesota*	28	15	6	7	37	106	81	45	28	8	9	189	122
#11 Minnesota State-Mankato	28	15	6	7	37	116	104	41	20	11	10	155	144
#13 North Dakota	28	14	9	5	33	103	82	43	26	12	5	172	120
#14 Minnesota-Duluth	28	14	10	4	32	95	80	42	22	15	5	153	119
St. Cloud State	28	12	11	5	29	96	85	38	17	16	5	124	118
Denver	28	11	11	6	28	95	85	41	21	14	6	152	102
Wisconsin	28	7	14	4	18	61	101	40	13	23	4	93	134
Michigan Tech	28	7	18	3	17	77	116	38	10	24	4	109	154
Alaska-Anchorage	28	0	22	6	6	41	111	36	1	28	7	57	143
Championship: Minnesota † indicates conference regular season champion * indicates conference tournament champion Final rankings: USA Today/American Hockey Magazine Poll Top 15 Poll

== Schedule and results ==
Date	Time	Opponent^{#}	Rank^{#}	Site	TV	Decision	Result	Attendance	Record
Regular season
October 12	7:05 PM	vs. #15 Ohio State*	#1	Xcel Energy Center • Saint Paul, Minnesota (US Hockey Hall of Fame game)		Weber	W 7–2	15,204	1–0–0
October 18	6:10 PM	at #3 New Hampshire*	#1	Whittemore Center • Durham, New Hampshire		Johnson	T 5–5 ^{OT}	6,501	1–0–1
October 19	6:10 PM	at #3 New Hampshire*	#1	Whittemore Center • Durham, New Hampshire		Weber	L 1–3	6,501	1–1–1
October 25	6:05 PM	at Michigan Tech	#2	MacInnes Student Ice Arena • Houghton, Michigan		Johnson	W 5–4	2,344	2–1–1 (1–0–0)
October 26	6:35 PM	at Michigan Tech	#2	MacInnes Student Ice Arena • Houghton, Michigan		Johnson	T 3–3 ^{OT}	2,701	2–1–2 (1–0–1)
November 1	7:05 PM	vs. Alabama–Huntsville*	#4	3M Arena at Mariucci • Minneapolis, Minnesota		Weber	W 12–1	10,058	3–1–2
November 2	7:05 PM	vs. Alabama–Huntsville*	#4	3M Arena at Mariucci • Minneapolis, Minnesota		Johnson	W 4–2	10,031	4–1–2
November 8	7:35 PM	at Minnesota State–Mankato	#3	Midwest Wireless Civic Center • Mankato, Minnesota		Weber	L 2–3	4,683	4–2–2 (1–1–1)
November 9	7:05 PM	at Minnesota State–Mankato	#3	Midwest Wireless Civic Center • Mankato, Minnesota		Johnson	W 7–4	5,084	5–2–2 (2–1–1)
November 16	7:05 PM	vs. #7 Colorado College	#8	Mariucci Arena • Minneapolis, Minnesota		Johnson	L 3–7	10,119	5–3–2 (2–2–1)
November 17	7:05 PM	vs. #7 Colorado College	#8	Mariucci Arena • Minneapolis, Minnesota		Weber	T 2–2 ^{OT}	10,129	5–3–3 (2–2–2)
November 22	7:05 PM	vs. Michigan Tech	#9	Mariucci Arena • Minneapolis, Minnesota		Weber	W 4–2	10,031	6–3–3 (3–2–2)
November 23	7:05 PM	vs. Michigan Tech	#9	Mariucci Arena • Minneapolis, Minnesota		Weber	W 2–1	10,089	7–3–3 (4–2–2)
College Hockey Showcase
November 29	7:05 PM	vs. Michigan State*	#9	Mariucci Arena • Minneapolis, Minnesota (College Hockey Showcase game 1)		Weber	T 5–5 ^{OT}	10,153	7–3–4
December 1	2:05 PM	vs. #8 Michigan*	#9	Mariucci Arena • Minneapolis, Minnesota (College Hockey Showcase game 2)		Weber	L 1–3	10,036	7–4–4
December 6	7:05 PM	at Wisconsin	#10	Kohl Center • Madison, Wisconsin (Rivalry)		Weber	W 3–0	11,845	8–4–4 (5–2–2)
December 7	7:06 PM	at Wisconsin	#10	Kohl Center • Madison, Wisconsin (Rivalry)		Weber	W 3–2	13,715	9–4–4 (6–2–2)
December 9	7:05 PM	vs. Team Italy*	#10	Mariucci Arena • Minneapolis, Minnesota (Exhibition)		Johnson	W 4–2	9,455	
Dodge Holiday Classic
December 27	7:05 PM	vs. Yale*	#7	Mariucci Arena • Minneapolis, Minnesota (Dodge Holiday Classic semifinal)		Weber	W 7–3	10,058	10–4–4
December 28	7:05 PM	vs. #6 Boston College*	#7	Mariucci Arena • Minneapolis, Minnesota (Dodge Holiday Classic championship)		Weber	W 2–1 ^{OT}	10,058	11–4–4
January 3	7:05 PM	vs. St. Cloud State	#4	Mariucci Arena • Minneapolis, Minnesota (Rivalry)		Weber	L 3–4	10,117	11–5–4 (6–3–2)
January 4	7:05 PM	at St. Cloud State	#4	National Hockey Center • St. Cloud, Minnesota (Rivalry)		Weber	T 3–3 ^{OT}	6,685	11–5–5 (6–3–3)
January 10	7:05 PM	vs. #1 North Dakota	#7	Mariucci Arena • Minneapolis, Minnesota (Rivalry)		Weber	L 2–4	10,095	11–6–5 (6–4–3)
January 11	7:05 PM	vs. #1 North Dakota	#7	Mariucci Arena • Minneapolis, Minnesota (Rivalry)		Weber	W 6–3	10,160	12–6–5 (7–4–3)
January 17	7:05 PM	at USNTDP	#7	Mariucci Arena • Minneapolis, Minnesota (Exhibition)		Johnson	W 6–0	9,588	
January 24	7:05 PM	vs. Minnesota State–Mankato	#8	Mariucci Arena • Minneapolis, Minnesota		Weber	T 2–2 ^{OT}	10,060	12–6–6 (7–4–4)
January 25	7:05 PM	vs. Minnesota State–Mankato	#8	Mariucci Arena • Minneapolis, Minnesota		Weber	T 4–4 ^{OT}	10,037	12–6–7 (7–4–5)
January 31	10:05 PM	at Alaska–Anchorage	#7	Sullivan Arena • Anchorage, Alaska		Weber	W 4–0	3,767	13–6–7 (8–4–5)
February 1	10:05 PM	at Alaska–Anchorage	#7	Sullivan Arena • Anchorage, Alaska		Johnson	W 4–1	3,942	14–6–7 (9–4–5)
February 7	8:35 PM	at #1 Colorado College	#7	Colorado Springs World Arena • Colorado Springs, Colorado		Weber	L 2–6	7,428	14–7–7 (9–5–5)
February 8	8:05 PM	at #1 Colorado College	#7	Colorado Springs World Arena • Colorado Springs, Colorado		Johnson	W 3–2	7,604	15–7–7 (10–5–5)
February 15	7:05 PM	vs. Wisconsin	#7	Mariucci Arena • Minneapolis, Minnesota (Rivalry)		Weber	W 5–2	10,015	16–7–7 (11–5–5)
February 15	7:05 PM	vs. Wisconsin	#7	Mariucci Arena • Minneapolis, Minnesota (Rivalry)		Johnson	W 8–1	10,150	17–7–7 (12–5–5)
February 21	7:05 PM	at Minnesota–Duluth	#6	Duluth Entertainment Convention Center • Duluth, Minnesota (Rivalry)		Weber	W 5–4	5,409	18–7–7 (13–5–5)
February 22	7:05 PM	at Minnesota–Duluth	#6	Duluth Entertainment Convention Center • Duluth, Minnesota (Rivalry)		Johnson	L 4–5 ^{OT}	5,409	18–8–7 (13–6–5)
February 28	7:05 PM	vs. #13 Denver	#7	Mariucci Arena • Minneapolis, Minnesota		Weber	T 3–3 ^{OT}	10,006	18–8–8 (13–6–6)
March 1	7:05 PM	vs. #13 Denver	#7	Mariucci Arena • Minneapolis, Minnesota		Weber	W 8–5	10,015	19–8–8 (14–6–6)
March 7	7:11 PM	at #2 St. Cloud State	#6	National Hockey Center • St. Cloud, Minnesota (Rivalry)		Weber	W 5–3	6,685	20–8–8 (15–6–6)
March 8	7:11 PM	at #2 St. Cloud State	#6	Mariucci Arena • Minneapolis, Minnesota (Rivalry)		Weber	T 1–1 ^{OT}	10,218	20–8–9 (15–6–7)
WCHA Tournament
March 14	7:05 PM	vs. Michigan Tech*	#6	Mariucci Arena • Minneapolis, Minnesota (WCHA first round game 1)		Weber	W 3–1	9,897	21–8–9
March 15	7:05 PM	vs. Michigan Tech*	#6	Mariucci Arena • Minneapolis, Minnesota (WCHA first round game 1)		Johnson	W 5–2	9,945	22–8–9
Minnesota Won Series 2-0
March 21	7:08 PM	vs. #9 Minnesota State–Mankato*	#5	Xcel Energy Center • Saint Paul, Minnesota (WCHA semifinal)		Johnson	W 3–2 ^{OT}	17,012	23–8–9
March 22	7:08 PM	vs. #1 Colorado College*	#5	Xcel Energy Center • Saint Paul, Minnesota (WCHA championship)		Johnson	W 4–2	16,668	24–8–9
NCAA Tournament
March 28	7:35 PM	vs. Mercyhurst*	#4	Mariucci Arena • Minneapolis, Minnesota (NCAA West Regional semifinal)		Weber	W 9–2	9,554	25–8–9
March 29	4:05 PM	vs. #6 Ferris State*	#4	Mariucci Arena • Minneapolis, Minnesota (NCAA West Regional final)		Johnson	W 7–4	9,622	26–8–9
April 10	6:08 PM	vs. #4 Michigan*	#2	HSBC Arena • Buffalo, New York (NCAA National semifinal)		Weber	W 3–2 ^{OT}	18,702	27–8–9
April 12	6:02 PM	vs. #3 New Hampshire*	#2	HSBC Arena • Buffalo, New York (NCAA National championship)	ESPN	Weber	W 5–1	18,759	28–8–9
*Non-conference game. ^{#}Rankings from USCHO.com Poll. All times are in Central Time. Source:

== NCAA Championship ==
=== (W1) Minnesota vs. (NE1) New Hampshire ===
April 12	Minnesota	5 – 1	New Hampshire	HSBC Arena	Recap

Scoring summary
Period	Team	Goal	Assist(s)	Time	Score
1st	MIN	Matt DeMarchi (8)	Smaagaard	10:58	1–0 MIN
1st	UNH	Sean Collins (22) – PP	Martz and Aikins	19:41	1–1
2nd	None				
3rd	MIN	Thomas Vanek (31) – GW	Koalska	48:14	2–1 MIN
3rd	MIN	Jon Waibel (9)	Vanek	51:25	3–1 MIN
3rd	MIN	Barry Tallackson (8) – PP	Guyer and Harrington	53:34	4–1 MIN
3rd	MIN	Barry Tallackson (9) – EN	Potulny	58:31	5–1 MIN
Penalty summary
Period	Team	Player	Penalty	Time	PIM
1st	UNH	Colin Hemingway	Charging	8:57	2:00
1st	MIN	Keith Ballard	Roughing	11:35	2:00
1st	UNH	Justin Aikins	Hooking	13:12	2:00
1st	MIN	Garrett Smaagaard	Hitting after the Whistle	18:01	2:00
2nd	UNH	Patrick Foley	Charging	22:33	2:00
2nd	MIN	Thomas Vanek	Cross-Checking	23:10	2:00
2nd	UNH	Brian Yandle	Interference	35:27	2:00
2nd	MIN	Judd Stevens	Obstruction Holding	38:39	2:00
3rd	MIN	Jon Waibel	Hooking	48:59	2:00
3rd	UNH	Nathan Martz	Roughing	51:43	2:00
3rd	UNH	Tim Horst	Hooking	58:46	2:00
3rd	MIN	Jake Fleming	Slashing	58:46	2:00

Shots by period
Team	1	2	3	T
New Hampshire	7	9	11	27
Minnesota	16	14	15	45

Goaltenders
Team	Name	Saves	Goals against	Time on ice
UNH	Mike Ayers	40	4	59:28
MIN	Travis Weber	26	1	60:00

== Scoring statistics ==
Name	Position	Games	Goals	Assists	Points	PIM
Thomas Vanek	LW/RW	45	31	31	62	60
Troy Riddle	C	45	26	25	51	50
Keith Ballard	D	45	12	29	41	78
Matt Koalska	C	41	9	31	40	26
Paul Martin	D	45	9	30	39	32
Gino Guyer	C	41	13	16	29	10
Tyler Hirsch	F	43	9	15	24	30
Grant Potulny	C	23	15	8	23	12
Barry Tallackson	RW	32	9	14	23	18
Jake Fleming	F	41	10	9	19	36
Chris Harrington	D	45	4	14	18	60
Jon Waibel	F	40	9	8	17	18
Matt DeMarchi	D	44	8	9	17	130
Andy Sertich	D	44	5	8	13	12
Jerrid Reinholz	C	33	3	10	13	4
Dan Welch	W	18	5	5	10	12
Judd Stevens	D	44	3	6	9	12
Garrett Smaagaard	F	21	2	7	9	4
Joey Martin	D	24	3	4	7	16
Nick Anthony	F	34	1	4	5	12
P. J. Atherton	D	20	2	2	4	20
Brett MacKinnon	D	16	1	3	4	10
Mike Erikson	RW	16	0	2	2	4
Peter Kennedy	D	10	0	1	1	6
Justin Johnson	G	14	0	1	1	0
Travis Weber	G	34	0	1	1	0
Bench	-	-	-	-	-	14
Total			189	293	482	686

== Goaltending statistics ==
Name	Games	Minutes	Wins	Losses	Ties	Goals against	Saves	Shut outs	SV %	GAA
Travis Weber	34	1993	18	6	7	83	761	2	.902	2.50
Justin Johnson	14	764	10	2	2	37	285	0	.885	2.90
Empty Net	-	3	-	-	-	2	-	-	-	-
Total	45	2761	28	8	9	122	1046	2	.896	2.65

== Awards and honors ==
Honor	Player	Ref
Thomas Vanek	NCAA Tournament Most Outstanding Player	
Paul Martin	AHCA West Second Team All-American	
Travis Weber	NCAA All-Tournament Team	
Paul Martin	NCAA All-Tournament Team	
Matt DeMarchi	NCAA All-Tournament Team	
Thomas Vanek	NCAA All-Tournament Team	
Thomas Vanek	WCHA Rookie of the Year	
Grant Potulny	WCHA Most Valuable Player in Tournament	
Paul Martin	All-WCHA First Team	
Keith Ballard	All-WCHA Second Team	
Thomas Vanek	All-WCHA Second Team	
Troy Riddle	All-WCHA Third Team	
Chris Harrington	WCHA All-Rookie Team	
Thomas Vanek	WCHA All-Rookie Team	
Grant Potulny	WCHA All-Tournament Team	
Keith Ballard	WCHA All-Tournament Team	
Justin Johnson	WCHA All-Tournament Team	

== Players drafted into the NHL ==
=== 2003 NHL entry draft ===
= NHL All-Star team	= NHL All-Star	= NHL All-Star and NHL All-Star team	= Did not play in the NHL

Round	Pick	Player	NHL team
1	5	Thomas Vanek	Buffalo Sabres
3	78	Danny Irmen ^{†}	Minnesota Wild
3	87	Ryan Potulny ^{†}	Philadelphia Flyers
4	136	Mike Vannelli ^{†}	Atlanta Thrashers
5	165	Gino Guyer	Dallas Stars

† incoming freshman
