= 2003 NCAA Division I men's ice hockey tournament =

- 2003 Frozen Four logo
- Teams: 16
- Finals site: HSBC Arena, Buffalo, New York
- Champions: Minnesota Golden Gophers (5th title)
- Runner-up: New Hampshire Wildcats (2nd title game)
- Semifinalists: Cornell Big Red (8th Frozen Four); Michigan Wolverines (22nd Frozen Four)
- Winning coach: Don Lucia (2nd title)
- MOP: Thomas Vanek (Minnesota)
- Attendance: 111,224

The 2003 NCAA Division I men's ice hockey tournament involved 16 schools playing in single-elimination play to determine the national champion of men's NCAA Division I college ice hockey. The tournament began on March 28, 2003, and ended with the championship game on April 12. A total of 15 games were played. 2003 was the first year 16 teams were invited to the tournament and was the first expansion of the tournament since 1988 when it increased from eight to 12 teams. The first and second rounds of the 2003 tournament were divided across four regional sites, an increase from the two regional format in place since 1992.

This year's tournament was the first since 1998 to feature multiple programs, Minnesota State and Wayne State, making their first appearance in the NCAA playoffs.

Minnesota became the first team to successfully defend their title since Boston University won back-to-back titles in 1971 and 1972.

== Game locations ==
2003 Regionals (blue) and Frozen Four (red)

The NCAA Men's Division I Ice Hockey Championship is a single-elimination tournament featuring 16 teams representing all six Division I conferences in the nation. The Championship Committee seeds the entire field from 1 to 16 within four regionals of 4 teams. The winners of the six Division I conference championships receive automatic bids to participate in the NCAA Championship. Regional placements are based primarily on the home location of the top seed in each bracket with an attempt made to put the top-ranked teams close to their home site.

=== First round and regional finals ===
- East – Dunkin' Donuts Center, Providence, Rhode Island — Host: Providence College
- Midwest – Yost Ice Arena, Ann Arbor, Michigan — Host: Michigan
- Northeast – Centrum Centre, Worcester, Massachusetts — Host: Boston University
- West – Mariucci Arena, Minneapolis, Minnesota Host: Minnesota

=== Frozen Four ===
- HSBC Arena, Buffalo, New York

== Qualifying teams ==
The at-large bids and seeding for each team in the tournament was announced on March 23, 2003. The Western Collegiate Hockey Association (WCHA) had five teams receive a berth in the tournament, Hockey East had four teams receive a berth in the tournament, the Central Collegiate Hockey Association (CCHA) had three teams receive a berth in the tournament, the ECAC had two berths, while both the Metro Atlantic Athletic Conference (MAAC) and College Hockey America (CHA) received one bid for their tournament champions.

East Regional – Providence							Midwest Regional – Ann Arbor						
Seed	School	Conference	Record	Berth type	Appearance	Last bid	Seed	School	Conference	Record	Berth type	Appearance	Last bid
1	Cornell (1)	ECAC	28–4–1	Tournament champion	14th	2002	1	Colorado College (2)	WCHA	29–6–5	At-large bid	16th	2002
2	Boston College	Hockey East	23–10–4	At-large bid	23rd	2001	2	Maine	Hockey East	24–9–5	At-large bid	13th	2002
3	Ohio State	CCHA	24–12–5	At-large bid	3rd	1999	3	Michigan	CCHA	28–9–3	Tournament champion	26th	2002
4	Minnesota State-Mankato	WCHA	20–10–10	At-large bid	1st	Never	4	Wayne State	CHA	21–16–2	Tournament champion	1st	Never
West Regional – Minneapolis							Northeast Regional – Worcester						
Seed	School	Conference	Record	Berth type	Appearance	Last bid	Seed	School	Conference	Record	Berth type	Appearance	Last bid
1	Minnesota (3)	WCHA	24–8–9	Tournament champion	27th	2002	1	New Hampshire (4)	Hockey East	25–7–6	Tournament champion	13th	2002
2	Ferris State	CCHA	30–10–1	At-large bid	1st	Never	2	Boston University	Hockey East	24–13–3	At-large bid	27th	2002
3	North Dakota	WCHA	26–11–5	At-large bid	18th	2001	3	Harvard	ECAC	22–9–2	At-large bid	18th	2002
4	Mercyhurst	MAAC	22–12–2	Tournament champion	2nd	2001	4	St. Cloud State	WCHA	17–15–5	At-large bid	5th	2002

Number in parentheses denotes overall seed in the tournament.

== Bracket ==
Regional Semifinals; March 28–29
1	Cornell (1)	5
4	Minnesota State	2
East – Providence – Sat/Sun
2	Boston College	1
3	Ohio State	0
1	New Hampshire (4)	5
4	St. Cloud State	2
Northeast – Worcester – Fri/Sat
2	Boston University	6
3	Harvard	4
1	Colorado College (2)	4
4	Wayne State	2
Midwest – Ann Arbor – Sat/Sun
2	Maine	1
3	Michigan	2
1	Minnesota (3)	9
4	Mercyhurst	2
West – Minneapolis – Fri/Sat
2	Ferris State	5
3	North Dakota	2

Regional Finals; March 29–30
1	Cornell (1)	2**
2	Boston College	1
1	New Hampshire (4)	3
2	Boston University	0
1	Colorado College (2)	3
3	Michigan	5
1	Minnesota (3)	7
2	Ferris State	4

National Semifinals; April 10
E1	Cornell (1)	2
NE1	New Hampshire (4)	3
MW3	Michigan	2
W1	Minnesota (3)	3*

National Fhampionship; April 12
NE1	New Hampshire (4)	1
W1	Minnesota (3)	5

Number in parentheses denotes overall seed in the tournament
Note: * denotes overtime period(s)

== Results ==
=== East Regional – Providence, Rhode Island ===
==== Regional Semifinals ====
March 29, 2003; 12:00 pm	(1) Cornell	5–2 (2–1, 1–1, 2–0)	(4) Minnesota State-Mankato	Dunkin' Donuts Center

Game reference

David LeNeveu
Goalies
Jon Volp
Referee:
Steve Piotrowski
Linesmen:
John LaDuke
Kevin Langseth

(Murray) Mike Knoepfli – 01:53	1 – 0
(Knoepfli, Moulson) Shane Hynes – PP – 09:07	2 – 0
	2 – 1	10:12 – Dana Sorenson (Stevenson, Joseph)
	2 – 2	23:26 – PP – Brock Becker (Marler, Runkel)
(Moulson, Cook) Shane Hynes – GW PP – 33:56	3 – 2
(Cook) Mike Knoepfli – 46:42	4 – 2
(Vesce, Bâby) Sam Paolini – PP – 50:34	5 – 2

8 min
Penalties
26 min
36
Shots
20

March 29, 2003; 3:30 pm	(2) Boston College	1–0 (1–0, 0–0, 0–0)	(3) Ohio State	Dunkin' Donuts Center; Attendance: 6,583

Game reference
Matti Kaltiainen	Goalies	Mike Betz	Referee: Don Adam; Linesmen: Rick Looker; Kyle Bergren
(Forrest) Tony Voce – GW SH – 05:56 / 1 – 0			Referee: Don Adam; Linesmen: Rick Looker; Kyle Bergren
18 min	Penalties	16 min	Referee: Don Adam; Linesmen: Rick Looker; Kyle Bergren
21	Shots	26	Referee: Don Adam; Linesmen: Rick Looker; Kyle Bergren

==== Regional Final ====
March 30, 2003; 12:00 pm	(1) Cornell	2–1 (2OT) (1–0, 0–1, 0–0, 0–0, 1–0)	(2) Boston College	Dunkin' Donuts Center; Attendance: 7,489

Game reference

David LeNeveu
Goalies
Matti Kaltiainen
Referee:
Don Adam
Linesmen:
Rick Looker
Kyle Bergren

(unassisted) Ryan Vesce – 10:05	1 – 0
	1 – 1	28:00 – J. D. Forrest (Voce, Eaves)
(unassisted) Matt McRae – GW – 81:09	2 – 1

14 min
Penalties
12 min
36
Shots
27

=== Midwest Regional – Ann Arbor, Michigan ===
==== Regional Semifinals ====
March 29, 2003; 12:00 pm	(1) Colorado College	4–2 (1–0, 2–1, 1–1)	(4) Wayne State	Yost Ice Arena

Game reference

Curtis McElhinney
Goalies
David Guerrera
Referee:
Dan Murphy
Linesmen:
Kevin Sullivan
Peter Fiola

(Laux, Preissing) Brett Sterling – PP – 16:26	1 – 0
	1 – 1	24:51 – Keith Stanich (Kingston, Durbin)
(Stuart) James Laux – 25:31	2 – 1
(Sterling, Preissing) Noah Clarke – GW PP – 34:09	3 – 1
	3 – 2	46:31 – Billy Collins (Poupard, Stanich)
(Sejna, Clarke) Tom Preissing – PP – 50:02	4 – 2

35 min
Penalties
16 min
31
Shots
25

March 29, 2003; 3:30 pm	(2) Maine	1–2 (0–0, 0–0, 1–2)	(3) Michigan	Yost Ice Arena; Attendance: 6,798

Game reference

Frank Doyle
Goalies
Al Montoya
Referee:
Derek Shepherd
Linesmen:
Dan Carey
Tim Swaider

	0 – 1	46:47 – Eric Nystrom (Woodford)
(Kariya, Lawson) Colin Shields – 56:06	1 – 1
	1 – 2	58:29 – GW PP – Jed Ortmeyer (Tambellini, Nystrom)

10 min
Penalties
12 min
35
Shots
27

==== Regional Final ====
March 30, 2003; 3:00 pm	(1) Colorado College	3–5 (2–2, 1–1, 0–2)	(3) Michigan	Yost Ice Arena; Attendance: 6,781

Game reference

Curtis McElhinney
Goalies
Al Montoya
Referee:
Dan Murphy
Linesmen:
Kevin Sullivan
Peter Fiola

	0 – 1	02:22 – Eric Nystrom (Helminen, Mink)
(Sejna, Clarke) Brett Sterling – PP – 08:10	1 – 1
(Clarke, Preissing) Peter Sejna – PP – 10:42	2 – 1
	2 – 2	17:18 – Milan Gajic (Moss, Roemensky)
	2 – 3	21:23 – SH – Mark Mink (unassisted)
(Liebel) Brett Sterling – 31:57	3 – 3
	3 – 4	44:25 – GW – Jason Ryznar (unassisted)
	3 – 5	59:42 – EN PP – Mark Mink (Nystrom)

20 min
Penalties
16 min
24
Shots
32

=== West Regional – Minneapolis, Minnesota ===
==== Regional Semifinals ====
March 28, 2003; 7:30 pm	(1) Minnesota	9–2 (3–0, 5–0, 1–2)	(4) Mercyhurst	Mariucci Arena; Attendance: 9,554

Game reference

Travis Weber
Goalies
Andy Franck
Referee:
Jon Gravalese
Linesmen:
Tom Quinn
Joe Ross

(Guyer, Tallackson) Grant Potulny – 01:15	1 – 0
(Guyer) Keith Ballard – 04:33	2 – 0
(DeMarchi, Guyer) Grant Potulny – GW – 14:59	3 – 0
(Guyer) Barry Tallackson – 21:40	4 – 0
(Ballard) Thomas Vanek – 24:10	5 – 0
(Reinholz) Paul Martin – 25:07	6 – 0
(Fleming, Smaagaard) Jon Waibel – 25:34	7 – 0
(Fleming) Keith Ballard – 33:57	8 – 0
(Guyer, Tallackson) Grant Potulny – 41:05	9 – 0
	9 – 1	44:33 – PP – David Wrigley (Tackaberry)
	9 – 2	47:21 – PP – Scott Reynolds (Borrelli, Rivers)

8 min
Penalties
8 min
56
Shots
18

March 28, 2003; 4:00 pm	(2) Ferris State	5–2 (1–0, 2–0, 2–2)	(3) North Dakota	Mariucci Arena

Game reference

Mike Brown
Goalies
Jake Brandt (out 40:00)
Josh Siembida (in 40:00)
Referee:
Scott Hansen
Linesmen:
Bob Bernard
Joe Andrews

(Kunitz, Kinnie) Derek Nesbitt – PP – 14:01	1 – 0
(Kunitz, Milam) Simon Mangos – PP – 35:42	2 – 0
(Nesbitt, Kunitz) Jeff Legue – GW – 38:04	3 – 0
	3 – 1	47:25 – David Lundbohm (Bochenski, Jones)
(Large) Greg Rallo – 49:11	4 – 1
	4 – 2	55:34 – Ryan Hale (Prpich, Fuher)
(Meyer) Trevor Large – EN – 59:42	5 – 2

28 min
Penalties
16 min
27
Shots
46

==== Regional Final ====
March 29, 2003; 4:00 pm	(1) Minnesota	7–4 (5–2, 1–1, 1–1)	(2) Ferris State	Mariucci Arena; Attendance: 9,622

Game reference

(out 20:00) Justin Johnson
(in 20:00) Travis Weber
Goalies
Mike Brown
Referee:
Scott Hansen
Linesmen:
Bob Bernard
Joe Andrews

(Vanek, DeMarchi) Matt Koalska – 00:13	1 – 0
(unassisted) Keith Ballard – PP – 01:38	2 – 0
(Smaagaard) Jake Fleming – 06:09	3 – 0
	3 – 1	12:02 – Chris Kunitz (Meyer)
(unassisted) Thomas Vanek – 12:41	4 – 1
	4 – 2	17:48 – SH – Chris Kunitz (Nesbitt)
(Hirsch, Tallackson) Matt DeMarchi – GW PP – 18:54	5 – 2
	5 – 3	32:43 – Derek Nesbitt (unassisted)
(Koalska) Thomas Vanek – 39:31	6 – 3
	6 – 4	42:04 – Phil Lewandowski (Field)
(Smaagaard, Fleming) Jon Waibel – 50:31	7 – 4

8 min
Penalties
28 min
49
Shots
20

=== Northeast Regional – Worcester, Massachusetts ===
==== Regional Semifinals ====
March 28, 2003; 7:30 pm	(1) New Hampshire	5–2 (2–1, 2–1, 1–0)	(4) St. Cloud State	Centrum Centre; Attendance: 9,024

Game reference

Mike Ayers
Goalies
Jake Moreland
Referee:
Steve McInchak
Linesmen:
Tony Molina
Bruce Vida

(Gare, Prudden) Colin Hemingway – 00:10	1 – 0
	1 – 1	08:11 – PP – Ryan Malone (Hendricks, Motzko)
(Stafford) Colin Hemingway – PP – 18:47	2 – 1
(Abbott, Aikins) Preston Callander – GW – 21:20	3 – 1
	3 – 2	23:53 – Jeff Finger (Hendricks)
(Saviano, Martz) Sean Collins – PP – 27:08	4 – 2
(Aikins, Hemingway) Preston Callander – PP – 52:08	5 – 2

16 min
Penalties
22 min
30
Shots
37

March 28, 2003; 4:00 pm	(2) Boston University	6–4 (2–2, 1–1, 3–1)	(3) Harvard	Centrum Centre; Attendance: 9,024

Game reference

Sean Fields
Goalies
Dov Grumet-Morris
Referee:
Mike Schmitt
Linesmen:
Nate Freeman
Craig Hanson

(Miller, VanderGulik) Brian Collins – PP – 03:39	1 – 0
	1 – 1	04:07 – Brendan Bernakevitch (Pettit)
(Priem) Matt Radoslovich – 14:57	2 – 1
	2 – 2	17:06 – PP – Tyler Kolarik (Pettit, Welch)
	2 – 3	28:33 – Brett Nowak (Kolarik)
(Magowan, Skladany) Brad Zancanaro – 34:44	3 – 3
(McConnell) Mark Mullen – 40:45	4 – 3
(McConnell) Bryan Miller – GW PP – 42:03	5 – 3
(unassisted) František Skladaný – 43:34	6 – 3
	6 – 4	47:53 – PP – Dominic Moore (Johnson, Pettit)

14 min
Penalties
39 min
31
Shots
38

==== Regional Final ====
March 29, 2003; 8:00 pm	(1) New Hampshire	3–0 (1–0, 0–0, 2–0)	(2) Boston University	Centrum Centre; Attendance: 8,927

Game reference

Mike Ayers
Goalies
Sean Fields
Referee:
Mike Schmitt
Linesmen:
Nate Freeman
Craig Hanson

(Callander, Abbott) Joshua Prudden – GW PP – 13:09	1 – 0
(Aikins, Abbott) Patrick Foley – 49:12	2 – 0
(unassisted) Sean Collins – EN – 58:55	3 – 0

14 min
Penalties
10 min
27
Shots
27

=== Frozen Four – Buffalo, New York ===
==== National Semifinals ====
April 10, 2003; 12:00 pm	(E1) Cornell	2–3 (0–1, 1–2, 1–0)	(NE1) New Hampshire	HSBC Arena; Attendance: 18,637

Game reference

David LeNeveu
Goalies
Mike Ayers
Referee:
Don Adam
Linesmen:
Nate Freeman
Craig Hansen

	0 – 1	14:21 – Tim Horst (Scott)
	0 – 2	21:23 – Steve Saviano (Martz, Collins)
	0 – 3	27:10 – GW PP – Steve Saviano (Martz)
(Bâby, Murray) Ryan Vesce – PP – 29:38	1 – 3
(Cam Abbott, Hornby) Chris Abbott – 49:52	2 – 3

8 min
Penalties
12 min
21
Shots
21

April 10, 2003; 6:00 pm	(W1) Minnesota	3–2 (OT) (0–1, 1–1, 1–0, 1–0)	(MW3) Michigan	HSBC Arena; Attendance: 18,702

Game reference

Travis Weber
Goalies
Al Montoya
Referee:
Scott Hansen
Linesmen:
Bob Bernard
Joe Andrews

	0 – 1	09:33 – Brandon Kaleniecki (Ebbett)
	0 – 2	34:38 – Jed Ortmeyer (Tambellini)
(Vanek, Koalska) Troy Riddle – 37:45	1 – 2
(Tallackson, Harrington) Gino Guyer – 41:35	2 – 2
(unassisted) Thomas Vanek – GW – 68:55	3 – 2

10 min
Penalties
8 min
32
Shots
33

==== National Championship ====
April 12, 2003; 7:00 pm	(W1) Minnesota	5–1 (1–1, 0–0, 4–0)	(NE1) New Hampshire	HSBC Arena; Attendance: 18,759

Game reference
Referee: Steve Piotrowski; Linesmen: John LaDuke; Kevin Langseth

Scoring summary
Period	Team	Goal	Assist(s)	Time	Score
1st	MIN	Matt DeMarchi (8)	Smaagaard	10:58	1–0 MIN
1st	UNH	Sean Collins (22) – PP	Martz and Aikins	19:41	1–1
2nd	None				
3rd	MIN	Thomas Vanek (31) – GW	Koalska	48:14	2–1 MIN
3rd	MIN	Jon Waibel (9)	Vanek	51:25	3–1 MIN
3rd	MIN	Barry Tallackson (8) – PP	Guyer and Harrington	53:34	4–1 MIN
3rd	MIN	Barry Tallackson (9) – EN	Potulny	58:31	5–1 MIN
Penalty summary
Period	Team	Player	Penalty	Time	PIM
1st	UNH	Colin Hemingway	Charging	8:57	2:00
1st	MIN	Keith Ballard	Roughing	11:35	2:00
1st	UNH	Justin Aikins	Hooking	13:12	2:00
1st	MIN	Garrett Smaagaard	Hitting after the whistle	18:01	2:00
2nd	UNH	Patrick Foley	Charging	22:33	2:00
2nd	MIN	Thomas Vanek	Cross-checking	23:10	2:00
2nd	UNH	Brian Yandle	Interference	35:27	2:00
2nd	MIN	Judd Stevens	Obstruction – Holding	38:39	2:00
3rd	MIN	Jon Waibel	Hooking	48:59	2:00
3rd	UNH	Nathan Martz	Roughing	51:43	2:00
3rd	UNH	Tim Horst	Hooking	58:46	2:00
3rd	MIN	Jake Fleming	Slashing	58:46	2:00

Shots by period
Team	1	2	3	T
New Hampshire	7	9	11	27
Minnesota	16	14	15	45

Goaltenders
Team	Name	Saves	Goals against	Time on ice
UNH	Mike Ayers	40	4	59:28
MIN	Travis Weber	26	1	60:00

== All-Tournament team ==
- G: Travis Weber (Minnesota)
- D: Paul Martin (Minnesota)
- D: Matt DeMarchi (Minnesota)
- F: Steve Saviano (New Hampshire)
- F: Thomas Vanek* (Minnesota)
- F: Nathan Martz (New Hampshire)

* Most Outstanding Player(s)

== Record by conference ==
Conference	# of Bids	Record	Win %	Regional Finals	Frozen Four	Championship Game	Champions
WCHA	5	5-4	.556	2	1	1	1
Hockey East	4	5-4	.556	3	1	1	-
CCHA	3	3-3	.500	2	1	-	-
ECAC	2	2-2	.500	1	1	-	-
MAAC	1	0-1	.000	-	-	-	-
CHA	1	0-1	.000	-	-	-	-
