= Mariucci =

Mariucci may refer to:

== People ==
- John Mariucci, Ice hockey player and coach
- Steve Mariucci, American football coach

== Other ==
- Mariucci Arena
- Mariucci Classic
