= 2003 WCHA men's ice hockey tournament =

2003 WCHA Men's ice hockey tournament
- 2003 WCHA Final Five logo
- Dates: March 14–22, 2003
- Teams: 10
- Finals site: Xcel Energy Center; St. Paul, MN
- Champions: Minnesota (12th title)
- Winning coach: Don Lucia (1st title)
- MVP: Grant Potulny (Minnesota)
- Attendance: 72,786
- WCHA Men's Ice Hockey Tournaments

The 2003 WCHA Men's Ice Hockey Tournament was the 44th conference playoff in league history and 49th season where a WCHA champion was crowned. The 2003 tournament was played between March 14 and March 22, 2003, at five conference arenas and the Xcel Energy Center in St. Paul, Minnesota. By winning the tournament, Minnesota was awarded the Broadmoor Trophy and received the Western Collegiate Hockey Association's automatic bid to the NCAA Tournament.

== Format ==
The first round of the postseason tournament featured a best-of-three games format. All ten conference schools participated in the tournament with teams seeded No. 1 through No. 10 according to their final conference standing, with a tiebreaker system used to seed teams with an identical number of points accumulated. The top five seeded teams each earned home ice and hosted one of the lower seeded teams.

The winners of the first round series advanced to the Xcel Energy Center for the WCHA Final Five, the collective name for the quarterfinal, semifinal, and championship rounds. The Final Five uses a single-elimination format. Teams were re-seeded No. 1 through No. 5 according to the final regular season conference standings, with the top three teams automatically advancing to the semifinals.

=== Conference standings ===
Note: PTS = Points; GP = Games played; W = Wins; L = Losses; T = Ties; GF = Goals For; GA = Goals Against

2002–03 Western Collegiate Hockey Association standings
| | Conference | | | | | | | Overall | | | | | |
| | GP | W | L | T | PTS | GF | GA | GP | W | L | T | GF | GA |
|---|---|---|---|---|---|---|---|---|---|---|---|---|---|
| #5 Colorado College† | 28 | 19 | 4 | 5 | 43 | 125 | 70 | 42 | 30 | 7 | 5 | 190 | 103 |
| #2 Minnesota* | 28 | 15 | 6 | 7 | 37 | 106 | 81 | 45 | 28 | 8 | 9 | 189 | 122 |
| #11 Minnesota State-Mankato | 28 | 15 | 6 | 7 | 37 | 116 | 104 | 41 | 20 | 11 | 10 | 155 | 144 |
| #13 North Dakota | 28 | 14 | 9 | 5 | 33 | 103 | 82 | 43 | 26 | 12 | 5 | 172 | 120 |
| #14 Minnesota-Duluth | 28 | 14 | 10 | 4 | 32 | 95 | 80 | 42 | 22 | 15 | 5 | 153 | 119 |
| St. Cloud State | 28 | 12 | 11 | 5 | 29 | 96 | 85 | 38 | 17 | 16 | 5 | 124 | 118 |
| Denver | 28 | 11 | 11 | 6 | 28 | 95 | 85 | 41 | 21 | 14 | 6 | 152 | 102 |
| Wisconsin | 28 | 7 | 14 | 4 | 18 | 61 | 101 | 40 | 13 | 23 | 4 | 93 | 134 |
| Michigan Tech | 28 | 7 | 18 | 3 | 17 | 77 | 116 | 38 | 10 | 24 | 4 | 109 | 154 |
| Alaska-Anchorage | 28 | 0 | 22 | 6 | 6 | 41 | 111 | 36 | 1 | 28 | 7 | 57 | 143 |
Championship: Minnesota † indicates conference regular season champion * indicates conference tournament champion Final rankings: USA Today/American Hockey Magazine Poll Top 15 Poll

== Bracket ==
Teams are reseeded after the first round

First round March 14–16, 2003
1 | Colorado College | 5 | 4 | —
10 | Alaska-Anchorage | 3 | 1 | —
2 | Minnesota | 3 | 5 | —
9 | Michigan Tech | 1 | 2 | —
3 | Minnesota State | 2 | 6** | —
8 | Wisconsin | 1 | 5 | —
4 | North Dakota | 1 | 3* | 3*
7 | Denver | 4 | 2 | 2
5 | Minnesota-Duluth | 5 | 2 | 7
6 | St. Cloud State | 4 | 3* | 3

Quarterfinal; March 20, 2003
4 | North Dakota | 1
5 | Minnesota-Duluth | 2

Semifinals; March 21, 2003
1 | Colorado College | 4*
5 | Minnesota-Duluth | 3
2 | Minnesota | 3*
3 | Minnesota State | 2

Championship; March 22, 2003
1 | Colorado College | 2
2 | Minnesota | 4

Note: * denotes overtime period(s)

=== First round ===
==== (1) Colorado College vs. (10) Alaska-Anchorage ====
| March 14 | Colorado College | 5 – 3 | Alaska-Anchorage | World Arena, Colorado Springs | Recap |
| (Sejna, Clarke) Joe Cullen - 13:23 | | First period | 16:33 - PP - Matt Hanson |
| James Laux - 02:44 (Goolsby) Scott Polaski - 12:22 | | Second period | No scoring |
| (Clarke, Petoit) Peter Sejna - GW - 05:43 (Sejna) Noah Clarke - SH - 12:44 | | Third period | 13:05 - PP - Vladimir Novak (Glencross, Parez); 13:22 - Dan Gilkerson (Roach) |
| Curtis McElhinney ( 16 saves / 19 shots ) | | Goalie stats | Chris King ( 44 saves / 49 shots ) |

| March 15 | Colorado College | 4 – 1 | Alaska-Anchorage | World Arena, Colorado Springs | Recap |
| (Canzanello, Clarke) Peter Sejna - PP - 09:05 (McElhinney) Tom Preissing - GW - 15:51 (Sertich, Stuart) James Laux - PP - 18:11 | | First period | No scoring |
| (Canzanello, Preissing) Peter Sejna - PP - 04:16 | | Second period | No scoring |
| No scoring | | Third period | 13:03 - PP - Lee Green (Johnson, Shasby) |
| Curtis McElhinney ( 13 saves / 14 shots ) | | Goalie stats | Chris King ( 15 saves / 18 shots ) / Kevin Reiter ( 27 saves / 28 shots ) |

| Colorado College won series 2–0 |

==== (2) Minnesota vs. (9) Michigan Tech ====
| March 14 | Minnesota | 3 – 1 | Michigan Tech | Mariucci Arena | Recap |
| (Reinholz) Andy Sertich - 01:51 | | First period | No scoring |
| (Hirsch, Weber) Troy Riddle - GW PP - 08:42 (Hirsch, Sertich) Grant Potulny - PP - 14:51 | | Second period | 19:15 - PP - Chris Conner (Brown, Murphy) |
| No scoring | | Third period | No scoring |
| Travis Weber ( 21 saves / 22 shots ) | | Goalie stats | Cam Ellsworth ( 29 saves / 32 shots ) |

| March 15 | Minnesota | 5 – 2 | Michigan Tech | Mariucci Arena | Recap |
| (Riddle, Koalska) Grant Potulny - PP - 19:59 | | First period | 08:55 - Colin Murphy (Conner, Singer) |
| (Tallackson) Gino Guyer - SH - 04:35 (Harrington, Tallackson) Grant Potulny - GW - 09:23 (Potulny, Hirsch) Barry Tallackson - PP - 15:01 | | Second period | 15:41 - Brett Engelhardt |
| (Martin, Ballard) Thomas Vanek - PP - 08:36 | | Third period | No scoring |
| Travis Weber ( 4 saves / 5 shots ) / Justin Johnson ( 11 saves / 12 shots ) | | Goalie stats | Cam Ellsworth ( 55 saves / 60 shots ) |

| Minnesota won series 2–0 |

==== (3) Minnesota State-Mankato vs. (8) Wisconsin ====
| March 14 | Minnesota State-Mankato | 2 – 1 | Wisconsin | Verizon Wireless Center | Recap |

| March 15 | Minnesota State-Mankato | 6 – 5 | 2OT | Wisconsin | Verizon Wireless Center | Recap |

| Minnesota State-Mankato won series 2–0 |

==== (4) North Dakota vs. (7) Denver ====
| March 14 | North Dakota | 1 – 4 | Denver | Ralph Engelstad Arena | Recap |
| No Scoring | | First period | 03:22 - PP - Brett Skinner (Caldwell); 13:28 - GW - Luke Fulghum (Skinner, Bull) |
| (Spiewak, Fylling) David Lundbohm - 08:44 | | Second period | No scoring |
| No scoring | | Third period | 14:08 - Lukas Dora (Barber, Doell); 14:41 - Connor James (Halme, Drummond) |
| Marc Ranfranz ( 3 saves / 5 shots ) / Jake Brandt ( 8 saves / 10 shots ) | | Goalie stats | Adam Berkhoel ( 16 saves / 17 shots ) |

| March 15 | North Dakota | 3 – 2 | OT | Denver | Ralph Engelstad Arena | Recap |
| No Scoring | | First period | | No scoring |
| (Parise, Schneider) Rory McMahon - PP - 13:13 | | Second period | | 18:29 - PP - Greg Barber (MacKenzie, James) |
| (Schneider, Parise) Brandon Bochenski - EA PP - 16:42 | | Third period | | 14:23 - Ryan Caldwell (Fulghum, Dora) |
| (Schneider, Fuher) Brandon Bochenski - GW - 00:46 | | First overtime period | | No scoring |
| Jake Brandt ( 17 saves / 19 shots ) | | Goalie stats | | Wade Dubielewicz ( 30 saves / 33 shots ) |

| March 16 | North Dakota | 3 – 2 | OT | Denver | Ralph Engelstad Arena | Recap |
| (Bochenski, Marvin) Zach Parise - 07:31 | | First period | | No scoring |
| (Schneider, Parise) Mike Prpich - 19:19 | | Second period | | 05:05 - Lukas Dora (Doell, Barber); 13:41 - PP - Connor James (Keith, Doell) |
| No scoring | | Third period | | No scoring |
| (Lundbohm) Nick Fuher - GW - 18:56 | | First overtime period | | No scoring |
| Jake Brandt ( 25 saves / 27 shots ) | | Goalie stats | | Adam Berkhoel ( 37 saves / 40 shots ) |

| North Dakota won series 2–1 |

==== (5) Minnesota-Duluth vs. (6) St. Cloud State ====
| March 14 | Minnesota-Duluth | 5 – 4 | St. Cloud State | Duluth Entertainment Convention Center | Recap |
| Brett Hammond - 00:27 | | First period | 10:36 - PP - Jon Cullen (Malone, Eastman) |
| (Stauffacher, Hammond) Marco Peluso - PP - 02:58 (Lessard, Stapleton) Beau Geisler - 03:19 (Peluso, Stapleton) Junior Lessard - 06:07 | | Second period | 17:56 - PP - Matt Gens (Cullen, Malone) |
| Brett Hammond - GW SH - 03:08 | | Third period | 04:23 - PP - Jon Cullen (Motzko, Hendricks); 06:49 - Jonathan Lehun (Szabo, Hendricks) |
| Isaac Reichmuth ( 27 saves / 31 shots ) | | Goalie stats | Jason Montgomery ( 24 saves / 29 shots ) |

| March 15 | Minnesota-Duluth | 2 – 3 | OT | St. Cloud State | Duluth Entertainment Convention Center | Recap |
| (Anderson, Francisco) T. J. Caig - PP - 11:57; Tim Stapleton - SH - 18:56 | | First period | | 17:24 - Peter Szabo (Hendricks, Lehun) |
| No scoring | | Second period | | 17:17 - Matt Hendricks (Doyle) |
| No scoring | | Third period | | No scoring |
| No scoring | | First overtime period | | 09:00 - GW - Mike Doyle (Malone, Wright) |
| Rob Anderson ( 17 saves / 19 shots ) | | Goalie stats | | Jake Moreland ( 30 saves / 33 shots ) |

| March 16 | Minnesota-Duluth | 7 – 3 | St. Cloud State | Duluth Entertainment Convention Center | Recap |
| (Otten) Evan Schwabe - 09:15 | | First period | 03:44 - Ryan Malone (Motzko, Hendricks) |
| (Anderson) Drew Otten - 04:57 (Stapleton, Caig) Nick Anderson - PP - 05:59 (Stauffacher, Hammond) Beau Geisler - GW - 10:45 | | Second period | No scoring |
| (Lessard, Geris) Brett Hammond - PP - 04:40; Brett Hammond - SH - 05:59; Tim Stapleton - EN - 18:18 | | Third period | 03:57 - SH - Ryan Malone (Doyle); 10:19 - Matt Hendricks (Cullen) |
| Isaac Reichmuth ( 22 saves / 25 shots ) | | Goalie stats | Jake Moreland ( 29 saves / 35 shots ) |

| Minnesota-Duluth won series 2–1 |

=== Quarterfinal ===
==== (4) North Dakota vs. (5) Minnesota-Duluth ====
| March 20 | North Dakota | 1 – 2 | Minnesota-Duluth | Xcel Energy Center | Recap |
| (Schneider, Lundbohm) Brandon Bochenski - 07:12 | | First period | 08:48 - Matt Mathias (Schwabe) |
| No scoring | | Second period | No scoring |
| No scoring | | Third period | 14:47 - GW - Junior Lessard (Czech, Francisco) |
| Jake Brandt ( 25 saves / 27 shots ) | | Goalie stats | Isaac Reichmuth ( 31 saves / 32 shots ) |

=== Semifinals ===
==== (1) Colorado College vs. (5) Minnesota-Duluth ====
| March 21 | Colorado College | 4 – 3 | OT | Minnesota-Duluth | Xcel Energy Center | Recap |
| No Scoring | | First period | | 05:57 - Neil Petruic (Stauffacher, Hammond) |
| (Cullen) Colin Stuart - SH - 00:56 (Polaski, Stuart) Trevor Frischmon - 00:56 | | Second period | | 10:34 - Junior Lessard (Brosz, Geisler); 12:41 - Tim Stapleton (Hammond, Lessard) |
| (Sejna, Stuart) Tom Preissing - PP - 09:05 | | Third period | | No scoring |
| (Leibel) Brett Sterling - GW - 07:18 | | First overtime period | | No scoring |
| Curtin McElhinney ( 20 saves / 23 shots ) | | Goalie stats | | Rob Anderson ( 37 saves / 41 shots ) |

==== (2) Minnesota vs. (3) Minnesota State-Mankato ====
| March 21 | Minnesota | 3 – 2 | OT | Minnesota State-Mankato | Xcel Energy Center | Recap |
| (Ballard) Barry Tallackson - 04:42 | | First period | | 01:54 - Grant Stevenson (Joseph, Forscythe) |
| No scoring | | Second period | | 14:30 - PP - B.J. Abel (Bassett, Stevenson) |
| (Ballard, Martin) Grant Potulny - PP - 01:58 | | Third period | | No scoring |
| (Riddle, Harrington) Thomas Vanek - GW - 03:57 | | First overtime period | | No scoring |
| Justin Johnson ( 14 saves / 16 shots ) | | Goalie stats | | Jon Volp ( 46 saves / 49 shots ) |

=== Third Place ===
==== (3) Minnesota State-Mankato vs. (5) Minnesota-Duluth ====
| March 22 | Minnesota State-Mankato | 4 – 6 | Minnesota-Duluth | Xcel Energy Center | Recap |
| (Stevenson, Joseph) Cole Bassett - PP - 19:04 | | First period | 03:20 - Tim Hambly; 12:12 - Junior Lessard (Petruic, Brosz); 19:45 - Tyler Brosz (Caig) |
| (Bassett, Stevenson) Shane Joseph - PP - 12:19 (Bassett, Abel) Shane Joseph - PP - 13:06 | | Second period | 02:22 - Josh Miskovich (Czech) |
| (Dubel, Joseph) Adam Gerlach - 13:00 | | Third period | 06:15 - Steve Czech (Anderson, Francisco); 12:05 - T. J. Caig (Lessard) |
| Jason Jensen ( 7 saves / 10 shots ) / Jon Volp ( 27 saves / 30 shots ) | | Goalie stats | Isaac Reichmuth ( 23 saves / 27 shots ) |

=== Championship ===
==== (1) Colorado College vs. (2) Minnesota ====
| March 22 | Colorado College | 2 – 4 | Minnesota | Xcel Energy Center | Recap |
| No Scoring | | First period | 01:29 - Grant Potulny (Guyer); 01:49 - Gino Guyer (Potunly, Tallackson); 05:25 - GW PP - Grant Potulny (Vanek, Koalska) |
| (Preissing, Canzanello) Kevin Ulanski - PP - 19:46 | | Second period | No scoring |
| (Smaagaard) Jon Waibel - 05:13 | | Third period | 06:41 - PP - Peter Sejna (Clarke, Canzanello) |
| Curtis McElhinney ( 21 saves / 25 shots ) | | Goalie stats | Justin Johnson ( 36 saves / 38 shots ) |

== Tournament awards ==
=== All-Tournament Team ===
- F Grant Potulny* (Minnesota)
- F Junior Lessard (Minnesota-Duluth)
- F Shane Joseph (Minnesota State-Mankato)
- D Tom Preissing (Colorado College)
- D Keith Ballard (Minnesota)
- G Justin Johnson (Minnesota)

* Most Valuable Player(s)

=== Tournament Three Stars ===
- 3 Justin Johnson (Minnesota)
- 2 Peter Sejna (Colorado College)
- 1 Grant Potulny (Minnesota)

== See also ==
- Western Collegiate Hockey Association men's champions
