= Tyler Hirsch =

American ice hockey player (born 1984)

- Born: January 4, 1984 (age 42) Bloomington, Minnesota, USA
- Height: 5 ft 9 in (175 cm)
- Weight: 174 lb (79 kg; 12 st 6 lb)
- Position: Forward
- Shot: Right
- Played for: Minnesota; HPK; Johnstown Chiefs; Stockton Thunder
- Playing career: 2007–2010

Medal record

Representing United States

Ice hockey

World U18 Championships
Gold medal – first place	2002 Slovakia	

Tyler Hirsch (born January 4, 1984) is an American former professional ice hockey Forward. He won a National Championship with Minnesota in 2003.

== Career ==
Hirsch was a high-scoring player during his junior career. In his final year with Shattuck St. Mary's he averaged more than 2 points per game. He was also nearly a point-per game player for the US under-18 team at the World Championships, helping the squad win the gold medal. The following autumn, Hirsch joined the ice hockey team at Minnesota and was a solid offensive contributor. He helped the Golden Gophers repeat as national champions, and performed increasingly well over the next two seasons. During his junior year, Hirsch led the Gophers in scoring and helped propel the team to a #1 ranking midway through the year.

=== Colorado incident ===
In the 2005 WCHA tournament, Minnesota reached the semifinals and faced Colorado College in a battle of top-5 teams. The Golden Gophers ended up getting shutout by the Tigers, 0–3 and lost their chance at a conference championship. While it wasn't the end of their season, as Minnesota was guaranteed a spot in the NCAA tournament, Hirsch took the loss hard. After the game all of the players left the bench and returned to their locker rooms except for Hirsch. He skated out to center ice and launched himself towards one of the goal cages. Hirsch carried a puck in and took a full slapshot into net from a few feet away. At this point the situation took a bizarre turn because, instead of avoiding the goal cage, Hirsch continued to skate forward and crashed chest-first into the crossbar. He toppled the net and pushed it back with enough force to cause the Zamboni doors to pop open. Hirsch then calmly skated back to center ice, laid his stick down across the red line, and went to the Minnesota locker room.

Hirsch was later hospitalized for a nervous breakdown. Initial reporting placed part of the blame on Evangelical beliefs that he may have inherited from his mother. The assertion was that he felt the need to 'exorcise' the loss and was reported to have said to his teammates:

"We have to get the devil out of the building."

Hirsch missed the next three games for the Gophers but was cleared to participate in Minnesota's frozen four match against North Dakota. Prior to the game, Hirsch gave an interview where he talked about the incident but did not try to justify his actions. He chose to let people interpret his conduct on their own but did make a revealing statement about his family.

"If there's any family that can handle being labeled 'weird', it’s my family."

While Hirsch may have wanted to put his troubles behind him, he wasn't able to escape his demons. He played just two games the following season but received a redshirt so he could appear for a 5th year. While his scoring touch was still apparent, Hirsch was kicked off the team by head coach Don Lucia in December. While Hirsch stated that the cause was solely for academic reasons, his troubles did not prevent the Minnesota Wild from showing interest in the diminutive forward and offered him a try-out contract. He joined the Houston Aeros' for their training camp in the fall of 2007 but did not make the final roster. Instead he was offered a minor-league contract to play for the Texas Wildcatters, the Wild's AA-affiliate, and expected to report once their season began. Hirsch was reported to have given his verbal agreement to the deal but the contract was never signed. Instead, Hirsch claimed that he never saw a contract and accused the Wild of unethical practices.

Even with a tumultuous record, Hirsch still managed to start a professional career though he had to travel to Finland to do so. He appeared in three games for HPK and then quickly ended his scoreless tenure with the club before returning to North America. Hirsch finished out the rest of the season in the ECHL and then did not play at all the following year. He made another brief appearance, this time with the Johnstown Chiefs, during the 2009–10 season before hanging up his skates for good.

== Career statistics ==
=== Regular season and playoffs ===
			Regular season					Playoffs
Season	Team	League	GP	G	A	Pts	PIM	GP	G	A	Pts	PIM
2001–02	Shattuck-Saint Mary's	MSHSL	63	58	80	138	94	—	—	—	—	—
2002–03	Minnesota	WCHA	43	9	15	24	30	—	—	—	—	—
2003–04	Minnesota	WCHA	43	7	18	25	48	—	—	—	—	—
2004–05	Minnesota	WCHA	41	11	33	44	66	—	—	—	—	—
2005–06	Minnesota	WCHA	2	0	0	0	0	—	—	—	—	—
2006–07	Minnesota	WCHA	15	4	18	22	6	—	—	—	—	—
2007–08	HPK	SM-liiga	3	0	0	0	12	—	—	—	—	—
2007–08	Johnstown Chiefs	ECHL	31	11	19	30	38	—	—	—	—	—
2007–08	Stockton Thunder	ECHL	9	2	3	5	12	—	—	—	—	—
2009–10	Johnstown Chiefs	ECHL	6	0	1	1	2	—	—	—	—	—
NCAA totals			144	31	86	117	152	—	—	—	—	—
ECHL totals			46	13	23	36	52	—	—	—	—	—

=== International ===
Year	Team	Event	Result	GP	G	A	Pts	PIM
2002	USA	WJC U18	1st place, gold medalist(s)	8	2	5	7	18
