= Minnesota–St. Cloud State men's ice hockey rivalry =

College sports rivalry

- Minnesota Golden Gophers St. Cloud State Huskies
- Sport: Ice hockey
- First meeting: October 3, 1987; Minnesota 6, St. Cloud State 0
- Latest meeting: October 16, 2021; Minnesota 4, St. Cloud State 3 (OT)
- Next meeting: TBA
- Stadiums: 3M Arena at Mariucci; Herb Brooks National Hockey Center

Statistics
- Total meetings: 106
- All-time series: Minnesota leads, 59–35–15 (.610)
- Largest victory: Minnesota, 6–0 (3 October 1987); Minnesota, 7–1 (11 January 1991)
- Longest win streak: Minnesota, 10 (13 October 1990 – 6 March 1993)
- Longest unbeaten streak: Minnesota, 13 (3 October 1987 – 7 March 1993)
- Current win streak: Minnesota, 1 (16 October 2021 – present)

The Minnesota–St. Cloud State men's ice hockey rivalry is a college ice hockey rivalry between the Minnesota Golden Gophers men's ice hockey and St. Cloud State Huskies men's ice hockey programs. The first meeting between the two occurred on October 3, 1987, but wasn't played annually until 1990.

== History ==
While Minnesota and St. Cloud State both fielded varsity ice hockey teams since at least the early 1930s, the two programs never faced one another for over 50 years. Despite their campuses being just 65 miles apart, Minnesota was competing with the top tier colleges while St. Cloud were matched with the smaller schools. In the mid-80s, the administration at St. Cloud State decided to raise the profile of their college and hired legendary Gopher coach, Herb Brooks to head the team in 1986. He led the Huskies to their first ever NCAA Tournament appearance and, though he left for the NHL after the year, he set the program on the road to Division I play. The team was promoted to DI the following year and played their first game at that level against Minnesota. After a few years of playing as an independent, St. Cloud joined the WCHA in 1990 and the two programs became conference rivals.

The two played several times each season afterwards, with Minnesota carrying the balance of play for several years. Beginning in 1997, the two teams began facing one another with regularity in the conference playoffs. From '97 through '09, the Huskies and Gophers met nine times in the postseason. These frequent meeting had the effect of entrenching the rivalry between the two programs. After Minnesota and St. Cloud went their separate ways in 2013, the two were part of agreement to found the North Star College Cup, a Minnesota-based version of the Beanpot. The tournament didn't last long but both Minnesota and St. Cloud State continued their rivalry by scheduling one another in non-conference meeting more often than not.

== Game results ==
Full game results for the rivalry, with rankings beginning in the 1998–99 season.

Minnesota victories	St. Cloud State victories	Tie games

No.	Date	Location	Winning team		Losing team		Notes
1	3 October 1987	Eveleth Hippodrome; Eveleth, MN	Minnesota	6	St. Cloud State	0	United States Hockey Hall of Fame game
2	12 October 1990	National Hockey Center; St. Cloud, MN	Tie	3	Tie	3	(OT); WCHA play begins
3	13 October 1990	Williams Arena; Minneapolis, MN	Minnesota	5	St. Cloud State	4	
4	11 January 1991	Williams Arena; Minneapolis, MN	Minnesota	7	St. Cloud State	1	
5	12 January 1991	National Hockey Center; St. Cloud, MN	Minnesota	7	St. Cloud State	3	
6	1 November 1991	National Hockey Center; St. Cloud, MN	Minnesota	7	St. Cloud State	4	
7	2 November 1991	Williams Arena; Minneapolis, MN	Minnesota	7	St. Cloud State	2	
8	28 February 1992	Williams Arena; Minneapolis, MN	Minnesota	2	St. Cloud State	1	
9	29 February 1992	National Hockey Center; St. Cloud, MN	Minnesota	4	St. Cloud State	1	
10	19 December 1992	National Hockey Center; St. Cloud, MN	Minnesota	4	St. Cloud State	3	
11	20 December 1992	Williams Arena; Minneapolis, MN	Minnesota	5	St. Cloud State	2	
12	6 March 1993	Williams Arena; Minneapolis, MN	Minnesota	1	St. Cloud State	0	
13	7 March 1993	Target Center; Minneapolis, MN	Tie	2	Tie	2	(OT)
14	29 October 1993	National Hockey Center; St. Cloud, MN	St. Cloud State	3	Minnesota	2	
15	30 October 1993	Williams Arena; Minneapolis, MN	Tie	4	Tie	4	(OT)
16	4 March 1994	Williams Arena; Minneapolis, MN	Minnesota	5	St. Cloud State	3	
17	5 March 1994	National Hockey Center; St. Cloud, MN	St. Cloud State	8	Minnesota	4	
18	19 March 1994	Bradley Center; Milwaukee, WI	Minnesota	3	St. Cloud State	2	(OT); WCHA Championship
19	4 November 1994	Mariucci Arena; Minneapolis, MN	Minnesota	5	St. Cloud State	3	
20	5 November 1994	National Hockey Center; St. Cloud, MN	Minnesota	5	St. Cloud State	2	
21	4 March 1995	National Hockey Center; St. Cloud, MN	St. Cloud State	3	Minnesota	0	
22	5 March 1995	Mariucci Arena; Minneapolis, MN	Minnesota	5	St. Cloud State	3	
23	4 November 1995	National Hockey Center; St. Cloud, MN	Minnesota	4	St. Cloud State	3	
24	5 November 1995	Mariucci Arena; Minneapolis, MN	Minnesota	5	St. Cloud State	2	
25	16 February 1996	Mariucci Arena; Minneapolis, MN	Minnesota	8	St. Cloud State	3	
26	17 February 1996	National Hockey Center; St. Cloud, MN	St. Cloud State	4	Minnesota	3	(OT)
27	14 December 1996	National Hockey Center; St. Cloud, MN	Minnesota	4	St. Cloud State	1	
28	15 December 1996	Mariucci Arena; Minneapolis, MN	St. Cloud State	4	Minnesota	3	(OT)
29	17 January 1997	Mariucci Arena; Minneapolis, MN	St. Cloud State	5	Minnesota	2	
30	18 January 1997	National Hockey Center; St. Cloud, MN	Minnesota	6	St. Cloud State	4	
31	14 March 1997	St. Paul Civic Center; Saint Paul, MN	Minnesota	5	St. Cloud State	4	(OT); WCHA Semifinal
32	19 December 1997	Mariucci Arena; Minneapolis, MN	St. Cloud State	3	Minnesota	1	
33	20 December 1997	National Hockey Center; St. Cloud, MN	St. Cloud State	4	Minnesota	1	
34	6 March 1998	National Hockey Center; St. Cloud, MN	Minnesota	6	St. Cloud State	2	
35	7 March 1998	Mariucci Arena; Minneapolis, MN	Minnesota	5	St. Cloud State	3	
36	23 October 1998	Mariucci Arena; Minneapolis, MN	Minnesota	3	St. Cloud State	0	
37	24 October 1998	National Hockey Center; St. Cloud, MN	St. Cloud State	6	Minnesota	5	
38	19 February 1999	National Hockey Center; St. Cloud, MN	Tie	4	Tie	4	(OT)
39	20 February 1999	Mariucci Arena; Minneapolis, MN	Tie	2	Tie	2	(OT)
40	18 March 1999	Target Center; Minneapolis, MN	Minnesota	5	St. Cloud State	3	WCHA Quarterfinal
41	10 December 1999	National Hockey Center; St. Cloud, MN	St. Cloud State	4	Minnesota	3	(OT)
42	11 December 1999	Mariucci Arena; Minneapolis, MN	Tie	2	Tie	2	(OT)
43	3 March 2000	Mariucci Arena; Minneapolis, MN	St. Cloud State	5	Minnesota	0	
44	4 March 2000	National Hockey Center; St. Cloud, MN	St. Cloud State	4	Minnesota	3	
45	18 March 2000	Target Center; Minneapolis, MN	St. Cloud State	4	Minnesota	3	WCHA third-place game
46	17 November 2000	National Hockey Center; St. Cloud, MN	No. 3 Minnesota	2	No. 6 St. Cloud State	0	
47	18 November 2000	Mariucci Arena; Minneapolis, MN	No. 3 Minnesota	4	No. 6 St. Cloud State	3	
48	2 March 2001	Mariucci Arena; Minneapolis, MN	No. 5 St. Cloud State	6	No. 4 Minnesota	1	
49	3 March 2001	National Hockey Center; St. Cloud, MN	No. 5 St. Cloud State	5	No. 4 Minnesota	2	
50	18 March 2001	Xcel Energy Center; Saint Paul, MN	No. 2 St. Cloud State	3	No. 3 Minnesota	0	WCHA Semifinal
51	30 November 2001	Mariucci Arena; Minneapolis, MN	No. 2 St. Cloud State	3	No. 1 Minnesota	2	
52	1 December 2001	National Hockey Center; St. Cloud, MN	Tie	2	Tie	2	(OT)
53	1 March 2002	National Hockey Center; St. Cloud, MN	No. 6 Minnesota	5	No. 2 St. Cloud State	4	
54	2 March 2002	Mariucci Arena; Minneapolis, MN	No. 6 Minnesota	3	No. 2 St. Cloud State	1	
55	15 March 2002	Xcel Energy Center; Saint Paul, MN	No. 3 Minnesota	4	No. 5 St. Cloud State	1	WCHA Semifinal
56	3 January 2003	Mariucci Arena; Minneapolis, MN	St. Cloud State	4	No. 4 Minnesota	3	
57	4 January 2003	National Hockey Center; St. Cloud, MN	Tie	3	Tie	3	(OT)
58	7 March 2003	National Hockey Center; St. Cloud, MN	No. 6 Minnesota	5	No. 2 St. Cloud State	3	
59	8 March 2003	Mariucci Arena; Minneapolis, MN	Tie	1	Tie	1	(OT)
60	5 March 2004	Mariucci Arena; Minneapolis, MN	No. 10 Minnesota	7	No. 13 St. Cloud State	4	
61	6 March 2004	Mariucci Arena; Minneapolis, MN	No. 10 Minnesota	4	No. 13 St. Cloud State	2	
62	12 March 2004	Mariucci Arena; Minneapolis, MN	No. 8 Minnesota	6	No. 15 St. Cloud State	1	WCHA first round game 1
63	13 March 2004	Mariucci Arena; Minneapolis, MN	No. 8 Minnesota	7	No. 15 St. Cloud State	3	WCHA first round game 2
64	10 December 2004	National Hockey Center; St. Cloud, MN	No. 1 Minnesota	2	St. Cloud State	1	(OT)
65	11 December 2004	Mariucci Arena; Minneapolis, MN	No. 1 Minnesota	4	St. Cloud State	2	
66	25 February 2005	Mariucci Arena; Minneapolis, MN	No. 12 Minnesota	5	St. Cloud State	4	
67	26 February 2005	National Hockey Center; St. Cloud, MN	No. 12 Minnesota	4	St. Cloud State	1	
68	28 October 2005	National Hockey Center; St. Cloud, MN	St. Cloud State	3	No. 7 Minnesota	2	
69	29 October 2005	National Hockey Center; St. Cloud, MN	No. 7 Minnesota	3	St. Cloud State	1	
70	17 March 2006	Xcel Energy Center; Minneapolis, MN	St. Cloud State	8	No. 1 Minnesota	7	(OT); WCHA Semifinal
71	10 November 2006	Mariucci Arena; Minneapolis, MN	Tie	5	Tie	5	(OT)
72	11 November 2006	National Hockey Center; St. Cloud, MN	Tie	3	Tie	3	(OT)
73	23 February 2007	National Hockey Center; St. Cloud, MN	No. 5 St. Cloud State	5	No. 2 Minnesota	1	
74	24 February 2007	Mariucci Arena; Minneapolis, MN	No. 5 St. Cloud State	5	No. 2 Minnesota	3	
75	11 January 2008	Mariucci Arena; Minneapolis, MN	No. 15 St. Cloud State	3	No. 14 Minnesota	1	
76	12 January 2008	National Hockey Center; St. Cloud, MN	Tie	4	Tie	4	(OT)
77	20 March 2008	Xcel Energy Center; Minneapolis, MN	No. 12 Minnesota	3	No. 7 St. Cloud State	2	WCHA Quarterfinal
78	17 October 2008	National Hockey and Event Center; St. Cloud, MN	No. 9 Minnesota	3	No. 10 St. Cloud State	2	
79	18 October 2008	Mariucci Arena; Minneapolis, MN	No. 9 Minnesota	2	No. 10 St. Cloud State	1	
80	16 January 2009	Mariucci Arena; Minneapolis, MN	No. 8 Minnesota	5	St. Cloud State	1	
81	17 January 2009	National Hockey and Event Center; St. Cloud, MN	No. 8 Minnesota	8	St. Cloud State	6	
82	13 March 2009	Xcel Energy Center; Minneapolis, MN	Minnesota	4	St. Cloud State	2	WCHA first round game 1
83	14 March 2009	Xcel Energy Center; Minneapolis, MN	Minnesota	3	St. Cloud State	0	WCHA first round game 2
84	22 January 2010	National Hockey and Event Center; St. Cloud, MN	St. Cloud State	4	Minnesota	3	
85	23 January 2010	Mariucci Arena; Minneapolis, MN	St. Cloud State	4	Minnesota	1	
86	22 October 2010	Mariucci Arena; Minneapolis, MN	No. 14 St. Cloud State	5	No. 20 Minnesota	2	
87	24 October 2010	Mariucci Arena; Minneapolis, MN	No. 20 Minnesota	2	No. 14 St. Cloud State	1	
88	18 November 2011	National Hockey and Event Center; St. Cloud, MN	St. Cloud State	4	No. 1 Minnesota	3	
89	19 November 2011	Mariucci Arena; Minneapolis, MN	No. 1 Minnesota	5	St. Cloud State	0	
90	27 January 2012	Mariucci Arena; Minneapolis, MN	No. 3 Minnesota	2	St. Cloud State	1	
91	28 January 2012	National Hockey and Event Center; St. Cloud, MN	No. 3 Minnesota	3	St. Cloud State	2	
92	8 February 2013	National Hockey and Event Center; St. Cloud, MN	No. 1 Minnesota	4	No. 10 St. Cloud State	2	
93	9 February 2013	National Hockey and Event Center; St. Cloud, MN	No. 10 St. Cloud State	4	No. 1 Minnesota	3	WCHA play ends
94	24 January 2014	Xcel Energy Center; Minneapolis, MN	No. 1 Minnesota	4	No. 5 St. Cloud State	1	North Star College Cup semifinal
95	30 March 2014	Xcel Energy Center; Minneapolis, MN	No. 1 Minnesota	4	No. 8 St. Cloud State	0	NCAA Regional Final
96	31 October 2014	Herb Brooks National Hockey Center; St. Cloud, MN	No. 7 St. Cloud State	4	No. 1 Minnesota	1	
97	1 November 2014	Mariucci Arena; Minneapolis, MN	No. 1 Minnesota	4	No. 7 St. Cloud State	3	(OT)
98	27 November 2015	Mariucci Arena; Minneapolis, MN	No. 7 St. Cloud State	3	Minnesota	2	
99	29 November 2015	Mariucci Arena; Minneapolis, MN	No. 7 St. Cloud State	7	Minnesota	4	
100	21 October 2016	Mariucci Arena; Minneapolis, MN	No. 14 St. Cloud State	6	No. 7 Minnesota	5	(OT)
101	22 October 2016	Herb Brooks National Hockey Center; St. Cloud, MN	No. 14 St. Cloud State	3	No. 7 Minnesota	2	
102	6 January 2018	Herb Brooks National Hockey Center; St. Cloud, MN	No. 1 St. Cloud State	5	No. 10 Minnesota	2	
103	7 January 2018	3M Arena at Mariucci; Minneapolis, MN	No. 10 Minnesota	2	No. 1 St. Cloud State	0	
104	29 December 2020	3M Arena at Mariucci; Minneapolis, MN	Minnesota	4	St. Cloud State	1	Mariucci Classic Championship
105	15 October 2021	3M Arena at Mariucci; Minneapolis, MN	No. 2 St. Cloud State	2	No. 4 Minnesota	1	
106	16 October 2021	Herb Brooks National Hockey Center; St. Cloud, MN	No. 4 Minnesota	4	No. 2 St. Cloud State	3	(OT)
Series: Minnesota leads 59–35–12

== Series facts ==
Statistic	Minnesota	St. Cloud State
Games played	106	
Wins	59	35
Home wins	29	17
Road wins	20	15
Neutral site wins	10	3
Goals scored	376	306
Most goals scored in a game by one team	8 (16 February 1996, 17 January 2009)	8 (5 March 1994, 17 March 2006)
Most goals in a game by both teams	15 (17 March 2006 – St. Cloud State 8, Minnesota 7)	
Fewest goals in a game by both teams	1 (6 March 1993)	
Fewest goals scored in a game by one team in a win	1 (6 March 1993)	2 (15 October 2021)
Most goals scored in a game by one team in a loss	7 (17 March 2006)	6 (17 January 2009)
Largest margin of victory	6 (3 October 1987, 11 January 1991)	5 (3 March 2000, 2 March 2001)
Longest winning streak	10 (13 October 1990 – 6 March 1993)	5 (27 November 2015 – 6 January 2018)
Longest unbeaten streak	13 (3 October 1987 – 7 March 1993)	7 (17 March 2006 – 12 January 2008)
