= Tom Preissing =

American ice hockey player (born 1978)

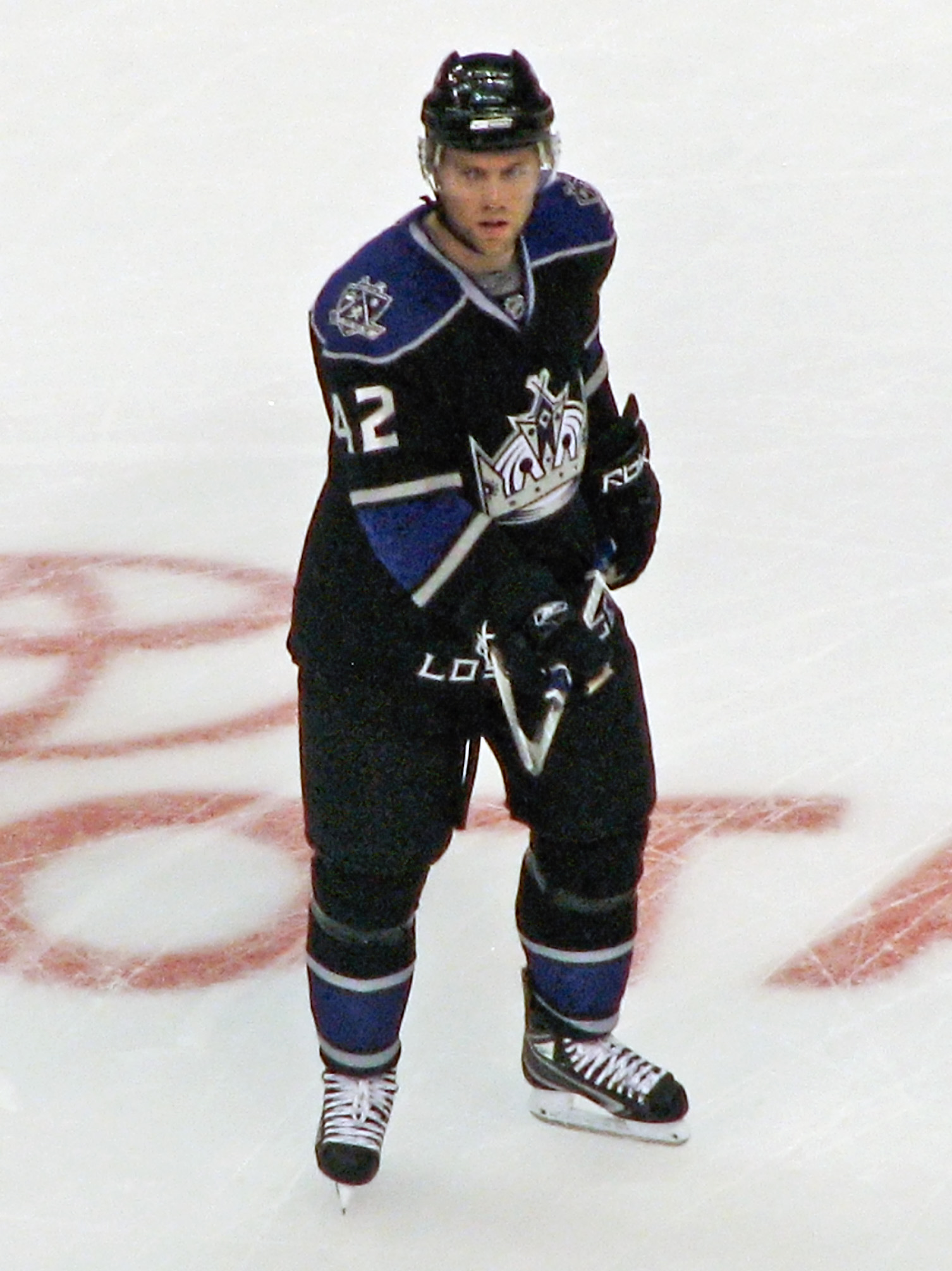
- Born: December 3, 1978 (age 47) Arlington Heights, Illinois, U.S.
- Height: 6 ft 0 in (183 cm)
- Weight: 197 lb (89 kg; 14 st 1 lb)
- Position: Defense
- Shot: Right
- Played for: San Jose Sharks; Krefeld Pinguine; Ottawa Senators; Los Angeles Kings; Colorado Avalanche; Barys Astana; EHC Biel; Rögle BK; TPS
- NHL draft: Undrafted
- Playing career: 2003–2013

Thomas Joseph Preissing (born December 3, 1978) is an American former professional ice hockey player who played six seasons in the National Hockey League (NHL). Preissing played in 326 NHL games with the San Jose Sharks, Ottawa Senators, Los Angeles Kings and the Colorado Avalanche. Preissing was born in Arlington Heights, Illinois, but grew up in Rosemount, Minnesota.

== Playing career ==
=== Amateur ===
Preissing played four years as a forward on the varsity team at Rosemount High School before moving on to play two seasons with the Green Bay Gamblers of the United States Hockey League (USHL). It was with the Gamblers that then-head coach Mark Osiecki converted Preissing to a defenseman, paving the way for his future hockey successes. Preissing played for Colorado College of the Western Collegiate Hockey Association (WCHA) and was a top-ten finalist for the Hobey Baker Award; he also captained the Tigers in his senior year. He earned NCAA - West First All-American honors and holds the WCHA record for most goals by a defenseman in a season with 23 in 2002–03.

=== Professional ===
Preissing was signed as an undrafted free agent by the San Jose Sharks on April 4, 2003. After a strong training camp with the Sharks, Preissing was a surprise inclusion on the opening night roster for the 2003–04 season. Tom played the full season with the Sharks where he had 2 goals and 17 assists in 69 games. He was praised for making the step directly from college to the NHL without stopping in the American Hockey League (AHL) and was named San Jose's rookie of the year in 2004. In the 2005–06 season, Preissing broke out, scoring 43 points in 74 games to have the second-highest-scoring season by a defenseman in Sharks history, behind only Sandis Ozoliņš. He also carried a +17 plus-minus rating, which ranked first among Sharks defensemen.

On July 9, 2006, Preissing and Josh Hennessy were traded by the Sharks to the Chicago Blackhawks for Mark Bell. Chicago immediately traded the two, along with Michal Barinka and a second-round draft pick in the 2008 NHL entry draft, to the Ottawa Senators in exchange for Martin Havlát and Bryan Smolinski. Preissing then spent the 2006–07 season with Ottawa, recording 38 points in 80 games and posting the third-best plus-minus rating (+40) of any NHL player. He helped the Senators reach the 2007 Stanley Cup Finals, in which they lost to the Anaheim Ducks in five games.

On July 2, 2007, Preissing signed a four-year, $11 million contract as an unrestricted free agent with the Los Angeles Kings. In the 2007–08 season, his first with the Kings, Preissing suffered in production, scoring only 24 points in 77 games, and his plus-minus slipped to –6. Preissing was benched for four games into the early stages of the 2008–09 season. After stepping up his play Preissing was then hampered by illness and upon recovery was assigned to the Kings affiliate, the Manchester Monarchs of the AHL on March 4, 2009, for the rest of the season.

On July 3, 2009, Preissing was traded by the Kings, along with Kyle Quincey and a fifth-round draft pick in the 2010 NHL entry draft, to the Colorado Avalanche in exchange for Ryan Smyth. Preissing missed training camp and the start of the 2009–10 season having a scope on his right knee. After a conditioning stint with Colorado's AHL affiliate, the Lake Erie Monsters, Preissing made his Avalanche debut in an 8–2 loss to the Vancouver Canucks on November 14, 2009. On November 29, 2009, after playing in four games with the Avs, Preissing was placed on waivers and reassigned back to the Monsters. Despite leading the Monsters defense with 31 points in 49 games, his considerably large contract meant he was placed on waivers for the purpose of a buy out of his final year from the Avalanche on June 30, 2010.

Without NHL interest, Preissing returned to Europe for the first time since 2005, signing a one-year contract with Kärpät of the Finnish SM-liiga on September 16, 2010. Under the agreement, he first joined Kazakh team Barys Astana of the Kontinental Hockey League (KHL), to start the 2010–11 season on a two-month loan through to November in order to attain game conditioning. On September 17, Preissing made a successful debut with Astana scoring a goal in a 6–5 overtime loss to Salavat Yulaev Ufa. However, just two days later, in his second game in a 4–1 victory against Metallurg Novokuznetsk, Preissing's tenure in the KHL was cut short when he suffered a serious knee injury. Due to return to Kärpät in November, but with the prospects of being unable to play from the injury, Preissing came to a mutual agreement to terminate his contract on October 11, 2010.

On July 11, 2011, Preissing signed a one-year contract with Swiss team EHC Biel for the 2011–12 season. In 29 games, Preissing contributed seven points before leaving at year's end to sign with Swedish club Rögle BK of the Elitserien on a one-year contract on July 15, 2012.

In the 2012–13 season, Priessing offensively produced early with Rögle BK, but with defensive performance below expectations, he was released by Rögle having scored 12 points in 29 games on December 5, 2012. On January 14, 2013, Preissing continued his well-traveled European tour, signing for the remainder of the Finnish season with TPS of the SM-liiga.

== Career statistics ==
			Regular season					Playoffs
Season	Team	League	GP	G	A	Pts	PIM	GP	G	A	Pts	PIM
1993–94	Rosemount High School	HSMN		3	11	14	14
1994–95	Rosemount High School	HSMN
1995–96	Rosemount High School	HSMN
1996–97	Rosemount High School	HSMN
1997–98	Green Bay Gamblers	USHL	56	8	13	21	30	4	0	2	2	2
1998–99	Green Bay Gamblers	USHL	53	18	37	55	40	6	3	6	9	2
1999–2000	Colorado College	WCHA	36	4	14	18	20	—	—	—	—	—
2000–01	Colorado College	WCHA	33	6	18	24	26	—	—	—	—	—
2001–02	Colorado College	WCHA	43	6	26	32	42	—	—	—	—	—
2002–03	Colorado College	WCHA	42	23	29	52	16	—	—	—	—	—
2003–04	San Jose Sharks	NHL	69	2	17	19	12	11	0	1	1	0
2004–05	Krefeld Pinguine	DEL	33	1	6	7	32	—	—	—	—	—
2005–06	San Jose Sharks	NHL	74	11	32	43	26	11	1	6	7	4
2006–07	Ottawa Senators	NHL	80	7	31	38	18	20	2	5	7	10
2007–08	Los Angeles Kings	NHL	77	8	16	24	16	—	—	—	—	—
2008–09	Los Angeles Kings	NHL	22	3	4	7	6	—	—	—	—	—
2008–09	Manchester Monarchs	AHL	14	2	4	6	6	—	—	—	—	—
2009–10	Lake Erie Monsters	AHL	49	9	22	31	38	—	—	—	—	—
2009–10	Colorado Avalanche	NHL	4	0	1	1	0	—	—	—	—	—
2010–11	Barys Astana	KHL	2	1	0	1	0	—	—	—	—	—
2011–12	EHC Biel	NLA	29	5	2	7	4	2	1	1	2	0
2012–13	Rögle BK	SEL	29	5	7	12	10	—	—	—	—	—
2012–13	TPS	SM-l	20	3	5	8	16	—	—	—	—	—
NHL totals			326	31	101	132	78	42	3	12	15	14

== Awards and honors ==
Award	Year
USHL
Defenseman of the Year	1999
First All-Star Team	1999
College
All-WCHA Third Team	2001, 2002
All-WCHA First Team	2003
WCHA Student-Athlete of the Year	2003
AHCA West First-Team All-American	2002–03
WCHA All-Tournament Team	2003

Awards and achievements
Preceded by Mark Cullen	WCHA Student-Athlete of the Year; 2002–03	Succeeded by Connor James
