= Minnesota–North Dakota men's ice hockey rivalry =

American inter-state sports rivalry

- Minnesota Golden Gophers North Dakota Fighting Hawks
- First meeting: January 23, 1948; North Dakota 5, Minnesota 3
- Latest meeting: October 23, 2026; Minnesota 5, North Dakota 3
- Next meeting: TBA
- Stadiums: 3M Arena at Mariucci; Ralph Engelstad Arena

Statistics
- Total meetings: 302
- All-time series: Minnesota leads, 148–138–16
- Largest victory: North Dakota, 9–0 (February 10, 1989); Minnesota, 10–1 (March 6, 1992)
- Longest win streak: Minnesota, 11 (February 9, 1973–December 5, 1975)
- Longest unbeaten streak: Minnesota, 12 (January 13, 1973–December 5, 1975)
- Current win streak: Minnesota, 3 (October 18, 2025–Present)

Locations of Minnesota and North Dakota

The Minnesota–North Dakota ice hockey rivalry is an intercollegiate ice hockey rivalry between the Minnesota Golden Gophers and North Dakota Fighting Hawks. The rivalry is between two of the most successful programs in the sport, as the teams have combined for 13 national titles and 46 Frozen Four appearances in the NCAA tournament. Minnesota has met North Dakota five times in the national tournament, holding a narrow 3–2 advantage.

After the 2012–13 season, Minnesota moved to the newly created Big Ten Conference, which began to sponsor ice hockey for the first time. Conference affiliation compelled the Gophers to leave the historic Western Collegiate Hockey Association, which the Gophers and Fighting Sioux had competed in together for 47 years. As a consequence of the move, the two would not play each other for two consecutive regular seasons, ending a run of 66 consecutive years of regular-season meetings, through they would meet in the 2014 Frozen Four. After the two year hiatus, the programs have scheduled non-conference matchups to preserve the rivalry, though the series no longer consists of the four game slate that constituted the old conference schedule. Nonetheless, the two programs continue to consider each other to be their most heated foe. Non-conference contests between the two teams are currently scheduled through the 2033–34 season, with a one year pause in the 2029–30 season due to a break between contracts.

== Series history ==
The series dates back to 1948, though Minnesota counts 1930s games against North Dakota before it became a varsity program in the official standings. Early folklore concerns partisans of the Fighting Sioux throwing dead gophers onto the ice.

Minnesota topped the Fighting Sioux in overtime in the national championship of the 1979 NCAA tournament, the first national postseason meeting between the two programs. In Detroit, the Gophers would down the Sioux in coach Herb Brooks' last game for Minnesota. Eight Gophers played the following year for Brooks as part of the Miracle on Ice team representing the United States in the 1980 Winter Olympics.

In 2005, the programs would meet in the Frozen Four for the second time. North Dakota raced to a 4–0 lead and held on despite two late goals from the Gophers. The win propelled North Dakota to the national championship, in which they lost to the Denver Pioneers.

After both teams left the WCHA amidst widespread conference realignment, the teams missed facing each other in the 2013–14 regular season. However, they met in the postseason, in the 2014 Frozen Four semifinal. Tied at 1 goal each, Justin Holl scored with 0.6 seconds left in the final period to secure a miracle win for the Gophers, who ultimately lost to the Union Dutchmen in the title game.

== Rival accomplishments ==
The following summarizes the accomplishments of the two programs.

Team	Minnesota Golden Gophers	North Dakota Fighting Hawks
NCAA National Titles	5	8
NCAA Frozen Four Appearances	23	23
NCAA Tournament Appearances	42	36
NCAA Tournament Record	61–42	55–30
NCAA Tournament Winning Percentage	.592	.647
Conference Tournament Titles	16	12
Conference Championships	20	22
Hobey Baker Award Winners	4	2
All-Americans	69	83
All-time Program Record	1968–1122–213	1687–1065–174
All-time Winning Percentage	.628	.606

== Game results ==
Complete game results, with USA Hockey rankings beginning in the 1995–96 season.

No.	Date	Location	Winning team		Losing team		Notes
1	January 23, 1948	Winter Sports Building; Grand Forks, ND	North Dakota	5	Minnesota	3	
2	January 24, 1948	Winter Sports Building; Grand Forks, ND	Minnesota	7	North Dakota	4	OT
3	January 21, 1949	Winter Sports Building; Grand Forks, ND	North Dakota	4	Minnesota	3	OT
4	January 22, 1949	Winter Sports Building; Grand Forks, ND	North Dakota	6	Minnesota	4	
5	January 28, 1949	Minneapolis Arena; Minneapolis, MN	Minnesota	12	North Dakota	5	
6	January 29, 1949	Minneapolis Arena; Minneapolis, MN	Minnesota	7	North Dakota	6	
7	January 6, 1950	Minneapolis Arena; Minneapolis, MN	North Dakota	7	Minnesota	3	
8	January 7, 1950	Mayo Civic Auditorium; Rochester, MN	North Dakota	6	Minnesota	5	
9	January 13, 1950	Winter Sports Building; Grand Forks, ND	North Dakota	3	Minnesota	2	
10	January 14, 1950	Winter Sports Building; Grand Forks, ND	North Dakota	8	Minnesota	5	
11	February 2, 1951	Winter Sports Building; Grand Forks, ND	North Dakota	8	Minnesota	4	
12	February 3, 1951	Winter Sports Building; Grand Forks, ND	Minnesota	7	North Dakota	2	
13	March 2, 1951	Williams Arena; Minneapolis, MN	Minnesota	5	North Dakota	2	
14	March 3, 1951	Williams Arena; Minneapolis, MN	Minnesota	3	North Dakota	2	
15	January 25, 1952	Winter Sports Building; Grand Forks, ND	North Dakota	5	Minnesota	1	MCHL play begins
16	January 26, 1952	Winter Sports Building; Grand Forks, ND	Minnesota	5	North Dakota	3	
17	February 15, 1952	Williams Arena; Minneapolis, MN	Minnesota	9	North Dakota	2	
18	February 16, 1952	Williams Arena; Minneapolis, MN	North Dakota	6	Minnesota	4	
19	January 30, 1953	Williams Arena; Minneapolis, MN	North Dakota	7	Minnesota	5	
20	January 31, 1953	Williams Arena; Minneapolis, MN	Minnesota	5	North Dakota	2	
21	February 6, 1953	Winter Sports Building; Grand Forks, ND	Minnesota	3	North Dakota	0	
22	February 7, 1953	Winter Sports Building; Grand Forks, ND	Minnesota	3	North Dakota	1	
23	January 8, 1954	Winter Sports Building; Grand Forks, ND	Tie	2	Tie	2	MCHL transitions to WIHL
24	January 9, 1954	Winter Sports Building; Grand Forks, ND	Minnesota	5	North Dakota	0	
25	February 5, 1954	Williams Arena; Minneapolis, MN	Minnesota	5	North Dakota	3	
26	February 6, 1954	Williams Arena; Minneapolis, MN	Minnesota	8	North Dakota	2	
27	January 7, 1955	Williams Arena; Minneapolis, MN	North Dakota	6	Minnesota	4	
28	January 8, 1955	Williams Arena; Minneapolis, MN	North Dakota	5	Minnesota	3	
29	March 4, 1955	Winter Sports Building; Grand Forks, ND	Minnesota	6	North Dakota	0	
30	March 5, 1955	Winter Sports Building; Grand Forks, ND	North Dakota	7	Minnesota	0	
31	January 27, 1956	Winter Sports Building; Grand Forks, ND	North Dakota	4	Minnesota	0	
32	January 28, 1956	Winter Sports Building; Grand Forks, ND	Minnesota	5	North Dakota	3	
33	March 2, 1956	Williams Arena; Minneapolis, MN	Minnesota	8	North Dakota	4	
34	March 3, 1956	Williams Arena; Minneapolis, MN	Minnesota	7	North Dakota	0	
35	January 11, 1957	Williams Arena; Minneapolis, MN	North Dakota	3	Minnesota	2	OT
36	January 12, 1957	Williams Arena; Minneapolis, MN	Minnesota	4	North Dakota	3	
37	January 25, 1957	Winter Sports Building; Grand Forks, ND	Minnesota	4	North Dakota	1	
38	January 26, 1957	Winter Sports Building; Grand Forks, ND	North Dakota	7	Minnesota	1	
39	January 17, 1958	Williams Arena; Minneapolis, MN	Minnesota	7	North Dakota	5	
40	January 18, 1958	Williams Arena; Minneapolis, MN	North Dakota	5	Minnesota	3	
41	February 14, 1958	Winter Sports Building; Grand Forks, ND	North Dakota	4	Minnesota	1	
42	February 15, 1958	Winter Sports Building; Grand Forks, ND	North Dakota	6	Minnesota	5	OT; WIHL play ends
43	January 30, 1959	Williams Arena; Minneapolis, MN	Minnesota	4	North Dakota	3	
44	January 31, 1959	Williams Arena; Minneapolis, MN	North Dakota	6	Minnesota	2	
45	February 20, 1959	Winter Sports Building; Grand Forks, ND	North Dakota	6	Minnesota	5	
46	February 21, 1959	Winter Sports Building; Grand Forks, ND	North Dakota	5	Minnesota	2	
47	January 15, 1960	Williams Arena; Minneapolis, MN	Minnesota	9	North Dakota	3	WCHA play begins
48	January 16, 1960	Williams Arena; Minneapolis, MN	North Dakota	4	Minnesota	1	
49	February 12, 1960	Winter Sports Building; Grand Forks, ND	North Dakota	6	Minnesota	5	
50	February 13, 1960	Winter Sports Building; Grand Forks, ND	North Dakota	5	Minnesota	1	
51	February 3, 1961	Winter Sports Building; Grand Forks, ND	Minnesota	9	North Dakota	2	
52	February 4, 1961	Winter Sports Building; Grand Forks, ND	North Dakota	4	Minnesota	3	OT
53	March 3, 1961	Williams Arena; Minneapolis, MN	Minnesota	6	North Dakota	4	
54	March 4, 1961	Williams Arena; Minneapolis, MN	Minnesota	4	North Dakota	3	OT
55	February 9, 1962	Williams Arena; Minneapolis, MN	Minnesota	4	North Dakota	1	
56	February 10, 1962	Williams Arena; Minneapolis, MN	North Dakota	5	Minnesota	4	OT
57	February 23, 1962	Winter Sports Building; Grand Forks, ND	North Dakota	3	Minnesota	2	
58	February 24, 1962	Winter Sports Building; Grand Forks, ND	North Dakota	6	Minnesota	5	OT
59	January 11, 1963	Williams Arena; Minneapolis, MN	North Dakota	6	Minnesota	4	
60	January 12, 1963	Williams Arena; Minneapolis, MN	North Dakota	3	Minnesota	2	
61	February 22, 1963	Winter Sports Building; Grand Forks, ND	North Dakota	4	Minnesota	3	
62	February 23, 1963	Winter Sports Building; Grand Forks, ND	North Dakota	4	Minnesota	3	
63	February 28, 1964	Winter Sports Building; Grand Forks, ND	Minnesota	4	North Dakota	2	
64	February 29, 1964	Winter Sports Building; Grand Forks, ND	Minnesota	5	North Dakota	4	OT
65	March 6, 1964	Williams Arena; Minneapolis, MN	Minnesota	5	North Dakota	3	
66	March 7, 1964	Williams Arena; Minneapolis, MN	North Dakota	3	Minnesota	1	
67	January 29, 1965	Williams Arena; Minneapolis, MN	North Dakota	5	Minnesota	4	OT
68	January 30, 1965	Williams Arena; Minneapolis, MN	North Dakota	3	Minnesota	1	
69	February 26, 1965	Winter Sports Building; Grand Forks, ND	North Dakota	6	Minnesota	0	
70	February 27, 1965	Winter Sports Building; Grand Forks, ND	North Dakota	5	Minnesota	4	
71	December 29, 1965	St. Paul Auditorium; St. Paul, MN	Minnesota	6	North Dakota	4	St. Paul Classic tournament final
72	February 4, 1966	Winter Sports Building; Grand Forks, ND	Minnesota	3	North Dakota	1	
73	February 5, 1966	Winter Sports Building; Grand Forks, ND	Minnesota	5	North Dakota	4	
74	February 18, 1966	Williams Arena; Minneapolis, MN	North Dakota	6	Minnesota	2	
75	February 19, 1966	Williams Arena; Minneapolis, MN	Minnesota	6	North Dakota	1	
76	March 3, 1966	Winter Sports Building; Grand Forks, ND	North Dakota	4	Minnesota	2	1966 WCHA West Regional semifinal
77	January 6, 1967	Williams Arena; Minneapolis, MN	North Dakota	5	Minnesota	4	OT
78	January 7, 1967	Williams Arena; Minneapolis, MN	North Dakota	3	Minnesota	2	
79	February 10, 1967	Winter Sports Building; Grand Forks, ND	North Dakota	3	Minnesota	2	
80	February 11, 1967	Winter Sports Building; Grand Forks, ND	North Dakota	3	Minnesota	2	
81	March 7, 1967	Williams Arena; Minneapolis, MN	North Dakota	7	Minnesota	2	1967 WCHA West Regional semifinal
82	January 5, 1968	Williams Arena; Minneapolis, MN	North Dakota	4	Minnesota	1	
83	January 6, 1968	Williams Arena; Minneapolis, MN	North Dakota	5	Minnesota	1	
84	February 2, 1968	Winter Sports Building; Grand Forks, ND	Minnesota	3	North Dakota	2	
85	February 3, 1968	Winter Sports Building; Grand Forks, ND	Minnesota	3	North Dakota	0	
86	December 21, 1968	Metropolitan Sports Center; Bloomington, MN	North Dakota	5	Minnesota	4	5OT; Minnesota Classic tournament final
87	January 3, 1969	Williams Arena; Minneapolis, MN	North Dakota	3	Minnesota	2	
88	January 4, 1969	Williams Arena; Minneapolis, MN	Minnesota	5	North Dakota	2	
89	January 10, 1969	Winter Sports Building; Grand Forks, ND	North Dakota	6	Minnesota	2	
90	January 11, 1969	Winter Sports Building; Grand Forks, ND	North Dakota	5	Minnesota	3	
91	December 5, 1969	Williams Arena; Minneapolis, MN	North Dakota	4	Minnesota	3	OT
92	December 6, 1969	Williams Arena; Minneapolis, MN	Minnesota	5	North Dakota	2	
93	February 20, 1970	Winter Sports Building; Grand Forks, ND	North Dakota	5	Minnesota	3	
94	February 21, 1970	Winter Sports Building; Grand Forks, ND	Minnesota	1	North Dakota	0	
95	January 29, 1971	Williams Arena; Minneapolis, MN	North Dakota	4	Minnesota	1	
96	January 30, 1971	Williams Arena; Minneapolis, MN	Minnesota	6	North Dakota	0	
97	February 12, 1971	Winter Sports Building; Grand Forks, ND	Tie	3	Tie	3	
98	February 13, 1971	Winter Sports Building; Grand Forks, ND	Minnesota	2	North Dakota	0	
99	March 13, 1971	Dane County Coliseum; Madison, WI	Minnesota	5	North Dakota	2	1971 WCHA East Regional final
100	January 14, 1972	Williams Arena; Minneapolis, MN	North Dakota	7	Minnesota	3	
101	January 15, 1972	Williams Arena; Minneapolis, MN	North Dakota	4	Minnesota	3	
102	February 25, 1972	Winter Sports Building; Grand Forks, ND	North Dakota	4	Minnesota	2	
103	February 26, 1972	Winter Sports Building; Grand Forks, ND	Minnesota	5	North Dakota	1	
104	January 12, 1973	Winter Sports Center; Grand Forks, ND	North Dakota	6	Minnesota	3	
105	January 13, 1973	Winter Sports Center; Grand Forks, ND	Tie	2	Tie	2	
106	February 9, 1973	Williams Arena; Minneapolis, MN	Minnesota	3	North Dakota	2	OT
107	February 10, 1973	Williams Arena; Minneapolis, MN	Minnesota	5	North Dakota	1	
108	November 16, 1973	Williams Arena; Minneapolis, MN	Minnesota	7	North Dakota	3	
109	November 17, 1973	Williams Arena; Minneapolis, MN	Minnesota	11	North Dakota	3	
110	January 4, 1974	Winter Sports Center; Grand Forks, ND	Minnesota	2	North Dakota	1	
111	January 5, 1974	Winter Sports Center; Grand Forks, ND	Minnesota	2	North Dakota	1	
112	November 8, 1974	Williams Arena; Minneapolis, MN	Minnesota	5	North Dakota	4	
113	November 9, 1974	Williams Arena; Minneapolis, MN	Minnesota	5	North Dakota	0	
114	February 7, 1975	Winter Sports Center; Grand Forks, ND	Minnesota	7	North Dakota	0	
115	February 8, 1975	Winter Sports Center; Grand Forks, ND	Minnesota	5	North Dakota	2	
116	December 5, 1975	Williams Arena; Minneapolis, MN	Minnesota	4	North Dakota	2	
117	December 6, 1975	Williams Arena; Minneapolis, MN	North Dakota	6	Minnesota	3	
118	March 5, 1976	Winter Sports Center; Grand Forks, ND	Minnesota	5	North Dakota	3	
119	March 6, 1976	Winter Sports Center; Grand Forks, ND	North Dakota	5	Minnesota	1	
120	November 19, 1976	Williams Arena; Minneapolis, MN	North Dakota	4	Minnesota	3	
121	November 20, 1976	Williams Arena; Minneapolis, MN	Minnesota	3	North Dakota	2	
122	March 4, 1977	Winter Sports Center; Grand Forks, ND	Minnesota	7	North Dakota	4	
123	March 5, 1977	Winter Sports Center; Grand Forks, ND	Minnesota	8	North Dakota	6	
124	November 11, 1977	Williams Arena; Minneapolis, MN	Minnesota	8	North Dakota	7	OT
125	November 12, 1977	Williams Arena; Minneapolis, MN	Minnesota	6	North Dakota	3	
126	March 3, 1978	Winter Sports Center; Grand Forks, ND	North Dakota	6	Minnesota	2	
127	March 4, 1978	Winter Sports Center; Grand Forks, ND	Minnesota	4	North Dakota	2	
128	December 15, 1978	Winter Sports Center; Grand Forks, ND	North Dakota	4	Minnesota	1	
129	December 16, 1978	Winter Sports Center; Grand Forks, ND	Minnesota	6	North Dakota	3	
130	March 2, 1979	Williams Arena; Minneapolis, MN	Minnesota	5	North Dakota	2	
131	March 3, 1979	Williams Arena; Minneapolis, MN	North Dakota	4	Minnesota	2	
132	March 24, 1979	Olympia Stadium; Detroit, MI	Minnesota	4	North Dakota	3	1979 NCAA National Championship
133	November 30, 1979	Winter Sports Center; Grand Forks, ND	North Dakota	6	Minnesota	3	
134	December 1, 1979	Winter Sports Center; Grand Forks, ND	North Dakota	7	Minnesota	6	
135	February 15, 1980	Williams Arena; Minneapolis, MN	North Dakota	5	Minnesota	3	
136	February 16, 1980	Williams Arena; Minneapolis, MN	North Dakota	6	Minnesota	2	
137	October 24, 1980	Winter Sports Center; Grand Forks, ND	Minnesota	9	North Dakota	8	
138	October 25, 1980	Winter Sports Center; Grand Forks, ND	Minnesota	4	North Dakota	3	OT
139	January 30, 1981	Williams Arena; Minneapolis, MN	North Dakota	2	Minnesota	1	
140	January 31, 1981	Williams Arena; Minneapolis, MN	Minnesota	11	North Dakota	3	
141	November 20, 1981	Williams Arena; Minneapolis, MN	North Dakota	5	Minnesota	2	
142	November 21, 1981	Williams Arena; Minneapolis, MN	Minnesota	7	North Dakota	5	
143	January 22, 1982	Winter Sports Center; Grand Forks, ND	North Dakota	3	Minnesota	1	
144	January 23, 1982	Winter Sports Center; Grand Forks, ND	North Dakota	4	Minnesota	1	
145	December 3, 1982	Williams Arena; Minneapolis, MN	North Dakota	5	Minnesota	4	
146	December 4, 1982	Williams Arena; Minneapolis, MN	Minnesota	5	North Dakota	2	
147	February 11, 1983	Winter Sports Center; Grand Forks, ND	Minnesota	5	North Dakota	2	
148	February 12, 1983	Winter Sports Center; Grand Forks, ND	Minnesota	2	North Dakota	1	
149	November 18, 1983	Williams Arena; Minneapolis, MN	Minnesota	4	North Dakota	3	
150	November 19, 1983	Williams Arena; Minneapolis, MN	Minnesota	1	North Dakota	0	
151	January 20, 1984	Williams Arena; Minneapolis, MN	North Dakota	3	Minnesota	1	
152	January 21, 1984	Williams Arena; Minneapolis, MN	Minnesota	7	North Dakota	4	
153	February 17, 1984	Winter Sports Center; Grand Forks, ND	Minnesota	5	North Dakota	4	
154	February 18, 1984	Winter Sports Center; Grand Forks, ND	Minnesota	6	North Dakota	3	
155	March 2, 1984	Winter Sports Center; Grand Forks, ND	North Dakota	4	Minnesota	3	1984 WCHA semifinal game 1
156	March 3, 1984	Winter Sports Center; Grand Forks, ND	North Dakota	5	Minnesota	4	1984 WCHA semifinal game 2
157	December 14, 1984	Winter Sports Center; Grand Forks, ND	North Dakota	4	Minnesota	1	
158	December 15, 1984	Winter Sports Center; Grand Forks, ND	Minnesota	5	North Dakota	3	
159	February 22, 1985	Williams Arena; Minneapolis, MN	North Dakota	6	Minnesota	1	
160	February 23, 1985	Williams Arena; Minneapolis, MN	Minnesota	5	North Dakota	2	
161	November 15, 1985	Winter Sports Center; Grand Forks, ND	North Dakota	7	Minnesota	4	
162	November 16, 1985	Winter Sports Center; Grand Forks, ND	Minnesota	3	North Dakota	2	
163	February 21, 1986	Mariucci Arena; Minneapolis, MN	Minnesota	6	North Dakota	3	
164	February 22, 1986	Mariucci Arena; Minneapolis, MN	Minnesota	6	North Dakota	0	
165	November 14, 1986	Mariucci Arena; Minneapolis, MN	North Dakota	4	Minnesota	1	
166	November 15, 1986	Mariucci Arena; Minneapolis, MN	Minnesota	4	North Dakota	1	
167	January 9, 1987	Winter Sports Center; Grand Forks, ND	North Dakota	5	Minnesota	2	
168	January 10, 1987	Winter Sports Center; Grand Forks, ND	North Dakota	4	Minnesota	2	
169	March 13, 1987	Winter Sports Center; Grand Forks, ND	North Dakota	5	Minnesota	3	1987 WCHA Championship game 1
170	March 14, 1987	Winter Sports Center; Grand Forks, ND	North Dakota	5	Minnesota	3	1987 WCHA Championship game 2
171	October 16, 1987	Winter Sports Center; Grand Forks, ND	Minnesota	4	North Dakota	2	
172	October 17, 1987	Winter Sports Center; Grand Forks, ND	Minnesota	5	North Dakota	2	
173	January 8, 1988	Mariucci Arena; Minneapolis, MN	Minnesota	4	North Dakota	3	
174	January 9, 1988	Mariucci Arena; Minneapolis, MN	Minnesota	7	North Dakota	3	
175	October 29, 1988	Mariucci Arena; Minneapolis, MN	Minnesota	2	North Dakota	1	
176	October 30, 1988	Mariucci Arena; Minneapolis, MN	Minnesota	7	North Dakota	1	
177	February 10, 1989	Ralph Engelstad Arena; Grand Forks, ND	North Dakota	9	Minnesota	0	
178	February 11, 1989	Ralph Engelstad Arena; Grand Forks, ND	Minnesota	9	North Dakota	3	
179	October 27, 1989	Ralph Engelstad Arena; Grand Forks, ND	Minnesota	6	North Dakota	5	
180	October 28, 1989	Ralph Engelstad Arena; Grand Forks, ND	Tie	4	Tie	4	OT
181	January 26, 1990	Mariucci Arena; Minneapolis, MN	Minnesota	5	North Dakota	4	
182	January 27, 1990	Mariucci Arena; Minneapolis, MN	North Dakota	7	Minnesota	4	
183	March 11, 1990	St. Paul Civic Center; St. Paul, MN	Minnesota	5	North Dakota	4	1990 WCHA semifinal
184	November 30, 1990	Ralph Engelstad Arena; Grand Forks, ND	North Dakota	6	Minnesota	1	
185	December 1, 1990	Ralph Engelstad Arena; Grand Forks, ND	Minnesota	6	North Dakota	3	
186	February 22, 1991	Mariucci Arena; Minneapolis, MN	Minnesota	4	North Dakota	1	
187	February 23, 1991	Mariucci Arena; Minneapolis, MN	Minnesota	11	North Dakota	5	
188	November 29, 1991	Mariucci Arena; Minneapolis, MN	Minnesota	4	North Dakota	2	
189	November 30, 1991	Mariucci Arena; Minneapolis, MN	Minnesota	8	North Dakota	2	
190	March 6, 1992	Ralph Engelstad Arena; Grand Forks, ND	Minnesota	10	North Dakota	1	
191	March 7, 1992	Ralph Engelstad Arena; Grand Forks, ND	Minnesota	5	North Dakota	3	
192	March 13, 1992	Mariucci Arena; Minneapolis, MN	North Dakota	5	Minnesota	3	1992 WCHA quarterfinals game 1
193	March 14, 1992	Mariucci Arena; Minneapolis, MN	Minnesota	9	North Dakota	2	1992 WCHA quarterfinals game 2
194	March 15, 1992	Mariucci Arena; Minneapolis, MN	Minnesota	3	North Dakota	1	1992 WCHA quarterfinals game 3
195	October 23, 1992	Mariucci Arena; Minneapolis, MN	North Dakota	8	Minnesota	4	
196	October 24, 1992	Mariucci Arena; Minneapolis, MN	Minnesota	8	North Dakota	4	
197	February 12, 1993	Ralph Engelstad Arena; Grand Forks, ND	Minnesota	6	North Dakota	1	
198	February 13, 1993	Ralph Engelstad Arena; Grand Forks, ND	North Dakota	6	Minnesota	2	
199	March 12, 1993	Mariucci Arena; Minneapolis, MN	Minnesota	6	North Dakota	4	1993 WCHA quarterfinals game 1
200	March 13, 1993	Mariucci Arena; Minneapolis, MN	Minnesota	5	North Dakota	4	OT; 1993 WCHA quarterfinals game 2; final Minnesota game in original Mariucci Arena
201	December 11, 1993	Mariucci Arena; Minneapolis, MN	Minnesota	6	North Dakota	5	
202	December 12, 1993	Mariucci Arena; Minneapolis, MN	Minnesota	3	North Dakota	0	
203	February 11, 1994	Ralph Engelstad Arena; Grand Forks, ND	Tie	3	Tie	3	
204	February 12, 1994	Ralph Engelstad Arena; Grand Forks, ND	Minnesota	7	North Dakota	2	
205	November 11, 1994	Ralph Engelstad Arena; Grand Forks, ND	Tie	4	Tie	4	
206	November 12, 1994	Ralph Engelstad Arena; Grand Forks, ND	North Dakota	4	Minnesota	3	
207	February 24, 1995	Mariucci Arena; Minneapolis, MN	Tie	3	Tie	3	
208	February 25, 1995	Mariucci Arena; Minneapolis, MN	Tie	5	Tie	5	
209	March 16, 1995	St. Paul Civic Center; St. Paul, MN	Minnesota	3	North Dakota	2	1995 WCHA Final Five quarterfinal
210	December 9, 1995	Mariucci Arena; Minneapolis, MN	#3 Minnesota	4	North Dakota	2	
211	December 10, 1995	Mariucci Arena; Minneapolis, MN	#3 Minnesota	6	North Dakota	1	
212	February 2, 1996	Ralph Engelstad Arena; Grand Forks, ND	North Dakota	8	#1 Minnesota	2	
213	February 3, 1996	Ralph Engelstad Arena; Grand Forks, ND	North Dakota	7	#1 Minnesota	5	
214	November 8, 1996	Mariucci Arena; Minneapolis, MN	#6 Minnesota	3	#4 North Dakota	2	
215	November 9, 1996	Mariucci Arena; Minneapolis, MN	#6 Minnesota	10	#4 North Dakota	6	
216	January 31, 1997	Ralph Engelstad Arena; Grand Forks, ND	#2 North Dakota	6	#3 Minnesota	4	
217	February 1, 1997	Ralph Engelstad Arena; Grand Forks, ND	#2 North Dakota	6	#3 Minnesota	2	
218	March 15, 1997	St. Paul Civic Center; St. Paul, MN	#5 North Dakota	4	#3 Minnesota	3	OT; 1997 WCHA Final Five Championship
219	October 31, 1997	Mariucci Arena; Minneapolis, MN	#8 Minnesota	6	#1 North Dakota	5	
220	November 1, 1997	Mariucci Arena; Minneapolis, MN	#1 North Dakota	3	#8 Minnesota	2	
221	February 14, 1998	Ralph Engelstad Arena; Grand Forks, ND	#1 North Dakota	4	Minnesota	2	
222	February 15, 1998	Ralph Engelstad Arena; Grand Forks, ND	#1 North Dakota	5	Minnesota	3	
223	November 13, 1998	Mariucci Arena; Minneapolis, MN	Tie	4	Tie	4	
224	November 14, 1998	Mariucci Arena; Minneapolis, MN	#2 North Dakota	5	Minnesota	3	
225	January 22, 1999	Ralph Engelstad Arena; Grand Forks, ND	#1 North Dakota	5	Minnesota	4	
226	January 23, 1999	Ralph Engelstad Arena; Grand Forks, ND	#1 North Dakota	6	Minnesota	5	
227	March 19, 1999	Target Center; Minneapolis, MN	#1 North Dakota	6	Minnesota	2	1999 WCHA Final Five semifinal
228	October 22, 1999	Mariucci Arena; Minneapolis, MN	Tie	2	Tie	2	
229	October 23, 1999	Mariucci Arena; Minneapolis, MN	North Dakota	3	Minnesota	2	
230	January 21, 2000	Ralph Engelstad Arena; Grand Forks, ND	#3 North Dakota	1	Minnesota	0	
231	January 22, 2000	Ralph Engelstad Arena; Grand Forks, ND	Minnesota	5	#3 North Dakota	2	
232	November 10, 2000	Ralph Engelstad Arena; Grand Forks, ND	#7 North Dakota	7	#2 Minnesota	5	
233	November 11, 2000	Ralph Engelstad Arena; Grand Forks, ND	Tie	5	Tie	5	
234	January 12, 2001	Mariucci Arena; Minneapolis, MN	#2 North Dakota	4	#8 Minnesota	1	
235	January 13, 2001	Mariucci Arena; Minneapolis, MN	#8 Minnesota	5	#2 North Dakota	1	
236	October 5, 2001	Ralph Engelstad Arena; Grand Forks, ND	#3 Minnesota	7	#2 North Dakota	5	2001 US Hockey Hall of Fame Game; inaugural game at new Ralph Engelstad Arena
237	January 5, 2002	Mariucci Arena; Minneapolis, MN	North Dakota	4	#2 Minnesota	3	
238	January 6, 2002	Mariucci Arena; Minneapolis, MN	#2 Minnesota	2	North Dakota	1	
239	February 8, 2002	Ralph Engelstad Arena; Grand Forks, ND	#5 Minnesota	6	North Dakota	4	
240	February 9, 2002	Ralph Engelstad Arena; Grand Forks, ND	#5 Minnesota	4	North Dakota	3	
241	March 8, 2002	Mariucci Arena; Minneapolis, MN	#3 Minnesota	7	North Dakota	2	
242	March 9, 2002	Mariucci Arena; Minneapolis, MN	#3 Minnesota	4	North Dakota	3	OT
243	January 10, 2003	Mariucci Arena; Minneapolis, MN	#1 North Dakota	4	#7 Minnesota	2	
244	January 11, 2003	Mariucci Arena; Minneapolis, MN	#7 Minnesota	6	#1 North Dakota	3	
245	November 7, 2003	Ralph Engelstad Arena; Grand Forks, ND	#2 North Dakota	7	#10 Minnesota	3	
246	November 8, 2003	Ralph Engelstad Arena; Grand Forks, ND	#2 North Dakota	5	#10 Minnesota	3	
247	January 23, 2004	Mariucci Arena; Minneapolis, MN	#1 North Dakota	4	#5 Minnesota	2	
248	January 24, 2004	Mariucci Arena; Minneapolis, MN	#5 Minnesota	2	#1 North Dakota	1	
249	March 20, 2004	Xcel Energy Center; St. Paul, MN	#5 Minnesota	5	#1 North Dakota	4	2004 WCHA Final Five Championship
250	October 22, 2004	Ralph Engelstad Arena; Grand Forks, ND	#2 North Dakota	4	#7 Minnesota	2	
251	October 23, 2004	Ralph Engelstad Arena; Grand Forks, ND	#7 Minnesota	6	#2 North Dakota	0	
252	March 19, 2005	Xcel Energy Center; St. Paul, MN	#13 North Dakota	4	#6 Minnesota	2	2005 WCHA Final Five third place game
253	April 7, 2005	Value City Arena; Columbus, OH	#11 North Dakota	4	#7 Minnesota	2	2005 NCAA National semifinal
254	December 9, 2005	Ralph Engelstad Arena; Grand Forks, ND	#8 Minnesota	4	#4 North Dakota	3	
255	December 10, 2005	Ralph Engelstad Arena; Grand Forks, ND	#8 Minnesota	4	#4 North Dakota	3	
256	January 13, 2006	Mariucci Arena; Minneapolis, MN	#2 Minnesota	6	#10 North Dakota	1	
257	January 14, 2006	Mariucci Arena; Minneapolis, MN	#10 North Dakota	4	#2 Minnesota	2	
258	January 26, 2007	Mariucci Arena; Minneapolis, MN	#15 North Dakota	5	#1 Minnesota	3	
259	January 27, 2007	Mariucci Arena; Minneapolis, MN	#15 North Dakota	7	#1 Minnesota	3	
260	March 17, 2007	St. Paul, MN	#2 Minnesota	3	#7 North Dakota	2	OT; 2007 WCHA Final Five Championship
261	March 25, 2007	Pepsi Center; Denver, CO	#6 North Dakota	3	#2 Minnesota	2	OT; 2007 NCAA West Regional final
262	December 7, 2007	Ralph Engelstad Arena; Grand Forks, ND	#8 North Dakota	4	Minnesota	2	
263	December 8, 2007	Ralph Engelstad Arena; Grand Forks, ND	Minnesota	4	#8 North Dakota	3	
264	February 1, 2008	Mariucci Arena; Minneapolis, MN	#3 North Dakota	2	#15 Minnesota	1	OT
265	February 2, 2008	Mariucci Arena; Minneapolis, MN	Tie	1	Tie	1	
266	January 9, 2009	Ralph Engelstad Arena; Grand Forks, ND	North Dakota	6	#3 Minnesota	3	
267	January 10, 2009	Ralph Engelstad Arena; Grand Forks, ND	North Dakota	6	#3 Minnesota	1	
268	October 16, 2009	Ralph Engelstad Arena; Grand Forks, ND	#3 North Dakota	4	#8 Minnesota	0	
269	October 17, 2009	Ralph Engelstad Arena; Grand Forks, ND	Tie	3	Tie	3	
270	January 15, 2010	Mariucci Arena; Minneapolis, MN	Tie	3	Tie	3	
271	January 16, 2010	Mariucci Arena; Minneapolis, MN	Minnesota	5	#4 North Dakota	1	
272	March 12, 2010	Ralph Engelstad Arena; Grand Forks, ND	#5 North Dakota	6	Minnesota	0	2010 WCHA first round game 1
273	March 13, 2010	Ralph Engelstad Arena; Grand Forks, ND	Minnesota	4	#5 North Dakota	2	2010 WCHA first round game 2
274	March 14, 2010	Ralph Engelstad Arena; Grand Forks, ND	#5 North Dakota	4	Minnesota	1	2010 WCHA first round game 3
275	January 14, 2011	Ralph Engelstad Arena; Grand Forks, ND	Minnesota	3	#2 North Dakota	2	
276	January 15, 2011	Ralph Engelstad Arena; Grand Forks, ND	#2 North Dakota	4	Minnesota	1	
277	November 4, 2011	Mariucci Arena; Minneapolis, MN	#5 Minnesota	2	#15 North Dakota	0	
278	November 5, 2011	Mariucci Arena; Minneapolis, MN	#5 Minnesota	3	#15 North Dakota	2	
279	January 13, 2012	Ralph Engelstad Arena; Grand Forks, ND	North Dakota	2	#5 Minnesota	1	
280	January 14, 2012	Ralph Engelstad Arena; Grand Forks, ND	#5 Minnesota	6	North Dakota	2	
281	March 16, 2012	Xcel Energy Center; St. Paul, MN	#4 North Dakota	6	#6 Minnesota	3	2012 WCHA Final Five semifinal
282	March 25, 2012	Xcel Energy Center; St. Paul, MN	#6 Minnesota	5	#4 North Dakota	2	2012 NCAA West Regional final
283	January 18, 2013	Mariucci Arena; Minneapolis, MN	#1 Minnesota	5	#6 North Dakota	1	
284	January 19, 2013	Mariucci Arena; Minneapolis, MN	Tie	4	Tie	4	OT; WCHA play ends
285	April 10, 2014	Wells Fargo Center; Philadelphia, PA	#1 Minnesota	2	#5 North Dakota	1	2014 NCAA National semifinal; first non-conference meeting after 2014 conference realignment
286	November 4, 2016	Mariucci Arena; Minneapolis, MN	Tie	5	Tie	5	
287	November 5, 2016	Mariucci Arena; Minneapolis, MN	#13 Minnesota	2	#3 North Dakota	0	
288	October 20, 2017	Ralph Engelstad Arena; Grand Forks, ND	#7 Minnesota	2	#4 North Dakota	1	
289	October 21, 2017	Ralph Engelstad Arena; Grand Forks, ND	#4 North Dakota	4	#7 Minnesota	0	
290	October 27, 2018	Orleans Arena; Las Vegas, NV	North Dakota	3	#5 Minnesota	1	2018 US Hockey Hall of Fame Game
291	November 28, 2019	3M Arena at Mariucci; Minneapolis, MN	#3 North Dakota	9	Minnesota	3	
292	November 29, 2019	3M Arena at Mariucci; Minneapolis, MN	#3 North Dakota	3	Minnesota	2	
293	November 26, 2021	Ralph Engelstad Arena; Grand Forks, ND	#12 Minnesota	5	#5 North Dakota	1	
294	November 27, 2021	Ralph Engelstad Arena; Grand Forks, ND	#5 North Dakota	3	#12 Minnesota	2	
295	October 21, 2022	3M Arena at Mariucci; Minneapolis, MN	#1 Minnesota	3	#7 North Dakota	2	OT
296	October 22, 2022	3M Arena at Mariucci; Minneapolis, MN	#7 North Dakota	5	#1 Minnesota	4	OT
297	October 20, 2023	Ralph Engelstad Arena; Grand Forks, ND	#1 Minnesota	4	#5 North Dakota	0	
298	October 21, 2023	Ralph Engelstad Arena; Grand Forks, ND	#5 North Dakota	2	#1 Minnesota	1	
299	October 17, 2025	Ralph Engelstad Arena; Grand Forks, ND	#8 North Dakota	5	#14 Minnesota	2	
300	October 18, 2025	Ralph Engelstad Arena; Grand Forks, ND	#14 Minnesota	5	#8 North Dakota	1	
301	October 22, 2026	3M Arena at Mariucci; Minneapolis, MN	Minnesota	5	#3 North Dakota	3	
302	October 23, 2026	3M Arena at Mariucci; Minneapolis, MN	Minnesota	5	#3 North Dakota	3	
303	Date TBA, 2027–28	Ralph Engelstad Arena; Grand Forks, ND	Minnesota		North Dakota		
304	Date TBA, 2027–28	Ralph Engelstad Arena; Grand Forks, ND	Minnesota		North Dakota		
305	Date TBA, 2028–29	3M Arena at Mariucci; Minneapolis, MN	North Dakota		Minnesota		
306	Date TBA, 2028–29	3M Arena at Mariucci; Minneapolis, MN	North Dakota		Minnesota		
307	Date TBA, 2030–31	Ralph Engelstad Arena; Grand Forks, ND	Minnesota		North Dakota		
308	Date TBA, 2030–31	Ralph Engelstad Arena; Grand Forks, ND	Minnesota		North Dakota		
309	Date TBA, 2031–32	3M Arena at Mariucci; Minneapolis, MN	North Dakota		Minnesota		
310	Date TBA, 2031–32	3M Arena at Mariucci; Minneapolis, MN	North Dakota		Minnesota		
311	Date TBA, 2032–33	Ralph Engelstad Arena; Grand Forks, ND	Minnesota		North Dakota		
312	Date TBA, 2032–33	Ralph Engelstad Arena; Grand Forks, ND	Minnesota		North Dakota		
313	Date TBA, 2033–34	3M Arena at Mariucci; Minneapolis, MN	North Dakota		Minnesota		
314	Date TBA, 2033–34	3M Arena at Mariucci; Minneapolis, MN	North Dakota		Minnesota		
Series: Minnesota leads 148–138–16

=== Exhibition Games ===
No.	Date	Location	Winning team		Losing team		Notes
1	October 18, 1975	Williams Arena; Minneapolis, MN	Minnesota	10	North Dakota	5	
2	October 16, 1977	Hibbing Memorial Building; Hibbing, MN	North Dakota	4	Minnesota	3	
3	October 20, 1978	All Seasons Arena; Minot, ND	Minnesota	6	North Dakota	5	
4	October 21, 1978	Eveleth Hippodrome; Eveleth, MN	Minnesota	5	North Dakota	3	1978 US Hockey Hall of Fame Game
Series: Minnesota leads 3–1
