= David Lundbohm =

American ice hockey player (born 1979)

- Born: December 17, 1979 (age 46) Roseau, Minnesota, U.S.
- Height: 6 ft 0 in (183 cm)
- Weight: 194 lb (88 kg; 13 st 12 lb)
- Position: Forward
- Shoots: Right
- Swe-1 team: Växjö Lakers Hockey
- Playing career: 2004–present

David Lundbohm (born December 17, 1979) is an American professional ice hockey forward. He currently plays for Växjö Lakers Hockey in the Swedish HockeyAllsvenskan.

He previously played in the Deutsche Eishockey Liga for the Straubing Tigers and in the Finnish SM-liiga for TPS. He also played in the ECHL for the Florida Everblades and the American Hockey League for the Providence Bruins.
