= Matt Koalska =

American ice hockey player (born 1980)

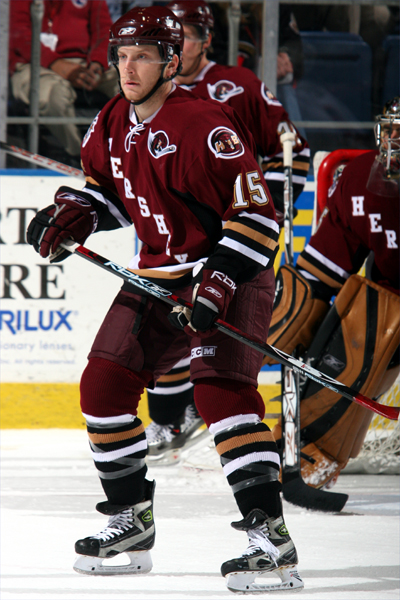
- Koalska with the Hershey Bears during the 2006-07 season
- Born: May 16, 1980 (age 46) Saint Paul, Minnesota, U.S.
- Height: 6 ft 0 in (183 cm)
- Weight: 205 lb (93 kg; 14 st 9 lb)
- Position: Center
- Shot: Left
- Played for: New York Islanders
- NHL draft: 154th overall, 2000; Nashville Predators
- Playing career: 2004–2007

Matthew James Koalska (born May 16, 1980) is an American former professional ice hockey center. He was drafted in the fifth round, 154th overall, by the Nashville Predators in the 2000 NHL entry draft. He played 3 games in the National Hockey League with the New York Islanders during the 2005–06 season. He retired in 2007 due to heart issues.

== Playing career ==
Koalska played his college hockey at the University of Minnesota from 2000–2004 winning two National Championships.

Koalska made his professional debut with the Bridgeport Sound Tigers of the American Hockey League in the 2004–05 season. He appeared in three NHL games with the New York Islanders in the 2005–06 season, going scoreless. On January 5, 2007, the Islanders traded Koalska to the Ottawa Senators in exchange for defenceman Tomas Malec. Koalska finished the season with the Senators' AHL affiliate, the Binghamton Senators before signing in the off-season with HC Bolazno in the Italian Elite League. However, Koalska did not play with Bolazno, having to retire due to a heart condition. He returned to University of Minnesota to complete his degree.

== Career statistics ==
=== Regular season and playoffs ===
			Regular season					Playoffs
Season	Team	League	GP	G	A	Pts	PIM	GP	G	A	Pts	PIM
1997–98	Hill–Murray School	HS-MN	—	—	—	—	—	—	—	—	—	—
1998–99	Hill–Murray School	HS-MN	26	20	50	70	18	—	—	—	—	—
1999–00	Twin City Vulcans	USHL	57	24	34	58	19	13	5	5	10	4
2000–01	University of Minnesota	WCHA	42	10	14	24	36	—	—	—	—	—
2001–02	University of Minnesota	WCHA	44	10	23	33	34	—	—	—	—	—
2002–03	University of Minnesota	WCHA	41	9	31	40	26	—	—	—	—	—
2003–04	University of Minnesota	WCHA	44	13	26	39	44	—	—	—	—	—
2004–05	Bridgeport Sound Tigers	AHL	60	7	8	15	22	—	—	—	—	—
2005–06	Bridgeport Sound Tigers	AHL	75	19	30	49	82	7	2	1	3	0
2005–06	New York Islanders	NHL	3	0	0	0	2	—	—	—	—	—
2006–07	Bridgeport Sound Tigers	AHL	3	0	0	0	0	—	—	—	—	—
2006–07	Hershey Bears	AHL	11	3	2	5	4	—	—	—	—	—
2006–07	Binghamton Senators	AHL	37	5	6	11	22	—	—	—	—	—
AHL totals			186	34	46	80	130	7	2	1	3	0
NHL totals			3	0	0	0	2	—	—	—	—	—
