= Mariucci Classic =

The Mariucci Classic is an annual men's college ice hockey tournament hosted by the University of Minnesota in Minneapolis, Minnesota. The tournament is contested by the Minnesota Golden Gophers and three visiting teams. Since the inaugural tournament in 1991, it has typically been held in December. The tournament went on hiatus for the 2017–18 and 2018-19 seasons, but returned for 2019-20.

== Yearly results ==
Year	Champion	Runner-up	Third place	Fourth place
2019	Minnesota	St. Cloud State	Minnesota State	Bemidji State
2016 (Dec)	Minnesota	UMass Amherst	Mercyhurst	Alabama–Huntsville
2016 (Jan)	Harvard	Minnesota	Ferris State	Connecticut
2015	UMass-Lowell	Merrimack	Minnesota	RIT
2014	Colgate	Ferris State	Minnesota	Rensselaer
2012	Minnesota	Boston College	Air Force	Alabama-Huntsville
2011	Northeastern	Minnesota	Princeton	Niagara
2010–11 (Dec–Jan)	Bemidji State	Union	Minnesota	Ferris State
2010	Northern Michigan	Minnesota	Bowling Green	Clarkson
2009	Minnesota	Northeastern	Western Michigan	Brown
2007	Boston College	RIT	Minnesota	Air Force
2006	Minnesota	Ferris State	Alabama–Huntsville	UMass
2005	Minnesota	UMass Lowell	Union	Canisius
2004	Minnesota	Northern Michigan	Merrimack	Harvard
2003	Minnesota	New Hampshire	Miami	Princeton
2002	Minnesota	Boston College	Yale	Bowling Green
2001	Minnesota	Providence	Western Michigan	Ferris State
2000	Minnesota	Lake Superior State	Bemidji State	Union
1999	Minnesota	Northern Michigan	UMass	Harvard
1998	Princeton	Boston University	Ohio State	Minnesota
1997	Northeastern	Minnesota	Notre Dame	Brown
1996	Minnesota	Miami (OH)	Clarkson	Boston College
1995	Minnesota	Bowling Green	New Hampshire	Harvard
1994	Boston University	Minnesota	Western Michigan	Yale
1993–94 (Dec–Jan)	Lake Superior State	Minnesota	Maine	Cornell
1993	Ferris State	St. Lawrence	Illinois–Chicago	Minnesota
1991	Minnesota	Bowling Green	Providence	Boston College
