= Chris Harrington (ice hockey) =

American ice hockey player

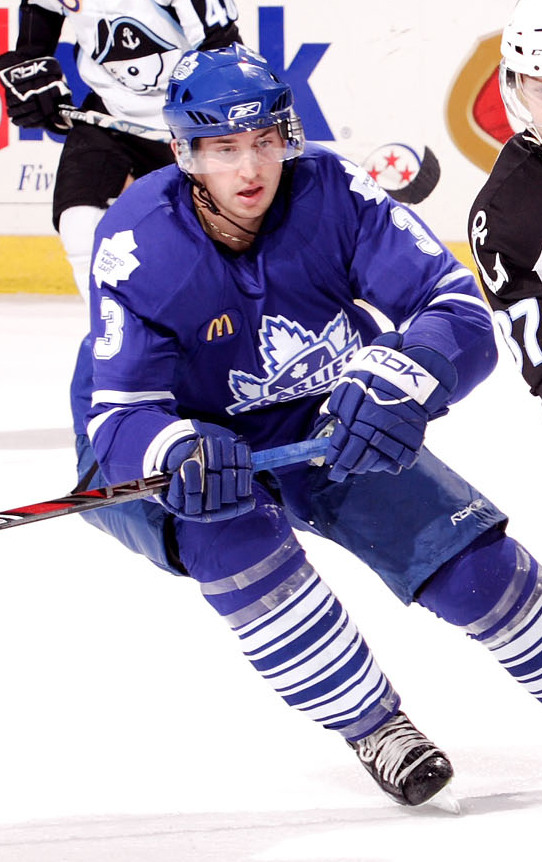
- Harrington with the Toronto Marlies in 2008
- Born: May 7, 1982 (age 43) St. Cloud, Minnesota, U.S.
- Height: 6 ft 0 in (183 cm)
- Weight: 182 lb (83 kg; 13 st 0 lb)
- Position: Defense
- Shot: Left
- Played for: Toronto Marlies; DEG Metro Stars; Oji Eagles
- Playing career: 2006–2013

Chris Harrington (born May 7, 1982) is an American former professional ice hockey defenseman.

== Career ==
Harrington started his career in junior level for the Omaha Lancers of the United States Hockey League from 2000 to 2002. He then played for the University of Minnesota from 2002 to 2006, before signing with the Toronto Maple Leafs in 2006. He spent two seasons with the Toronto Marlies in the American Hockey League but never managed to play in the NHL. He signed for the DEG Metro Stars in the Deutsche Eishockey Liga in 2008 and was released in April 2010. He then spent three seasons with the Oji Eagles in Asia League Ice Hockey before retiring in 2013.

== Career statistics ==
			Regular season					Playoffs
Season	Team	League	GP	G	A	Pts	PIM	GP	G	A	Pts	PIM
2000-01	Omaha Lancers	USHL	50	7	11	18	66	10	2	6	8	12
2001-02	Omaha Lancers	USHL	57	9	33	42	68	13	3	3	6	32
2002-03	U. Of Minnesota	NCAA	45	4	14	18	60	--	--	--	--	--
2003-04	U. Of Minnesota	NCAA	41	5	24	29	42	--	--	--	--	--
2004-05	U. Of Minnesota	NCAA	43	2	24	26	98	--	--	--	--	--
2005-06	U. Of Minnesota	NCAA	40	3	33	36	64	--	--	--	--	--
2006-07	Toronto Marlies	AHL	68	10	18	28	58	--	--	--	--	--
2007-08	Toronto Marlies	AHL	73	9	11	20	35	17	3	2	5	9
2008-09	DEG Metro Stars	DEL	51	4	19	23	34	16	0	9	9	18
2009-10	DEG Metro Stars	DEL	39	2	15	17	54	3	0	0	0	0
2010-11	Oji Eagles	ALIH	29	1	16	17	48	4	1	2	3	0
2011-12	Oji Eagles	ALIH	36	10	16	26	40	7	0	4	4	2
2012-13	Oji Eagles	ALIH	34	10	26	36	18	7	1	5	6	4
AHL CAREER TOTALS			141	19	29	48	93	17	3	2	5	9
DEL CAREER TOTALS			90	6	34	40	88	19	0	9	9	18
ALIH CAREER TOTALS			99	21	58	79	106	18	2	11	13	6

== Awards and honors ==
Award	Year
All-WCHA Rookie Team	2002–03
All-WCHA Third Team	2005–06
