= 2001 WCHA men's ice hockey tournament =

2001 WCHA Men's ice hockey tournament
- Dates: March 9–17, 2001
- Teams: 10
- Finals site: Xcel Energy Center; St. Paul, Minnesota
- Champions: St. Cloud State (1st title)
- Winning coach: Craig Dahl (1st title)
- MVP: Tyler Arnason (St. Cloud State)
- Attendance: 67,612
- WCHA Men's Ice Hockey Tournaments

The 2001 WCHA Men's Ice Hockey Tournament was the 42nd conference playoff in league history and 48th season where a WCHA champion was crowned. The 2001 tournament was played between March 9 and March 17, 2001, at five conference arenas and the Xcel Energy Center in St. Paul, Minnesota, the home of the NHL's Minnesota Wild. By winning the tournament, St. Cloud State was awarded the Broadmoor Trophy and received the Western Collegiate Hockey Association's automatic bid to the 2001 NCAA Men's Division I Ice Hockey Tournament. This was the inaugural year in which the Xcel Energy Center hosted the WCHA Final Five. It remained there until the conclusion of the 2013 tournament.

== Format ==
The first round of the postseason tournament featured a best-of-three games format. All ten conference schools participated in the tournament with teams seeded No. 1 through No. 10 according to their final conference standing, with a tiebreaker system used to seed teams with an identical number of points accumulated. The top five seeded teams each earned home ice and hosted one of the lower seeded teams.

The winners of the first round series advanced to the Xcel Energy Center for the WCHA Final Five, the collective name for the quarterfinal, semifinal, and championship rounds. The Final Five uses a single-elimination format. Teams were re-seeded No. 1 through No. 5 according to the final regular season conference standings, with the top three teams automatically advancing to the semifinals.

=== Conference standings ===
Note: GP = Games played; W = Wins; L = Losses; T = Ties; PTS = Points; GF = Goals For; GA = Goals Against

2000–01 Western Collegiate Hockey Association standings
	Conference							Overall					
	GP	W	L	T	PTS	GF	GA	GP	W	L	T	GF	GA
#2 North Dakota†	28	18	4	6	42	115	80	46	29	8	9	183	121
#5 St. Cloud State*	28	20	8	0	40	111	69	41	31	9	1	168	94
#9 Minnesota	28	18	8	2	38	107	70	42	27	13	2	171	109
#6 Colorado College	28	17	11	0	34	106	81	41	27	13	1	150	108
#8 Wisconsin	28	14	10	4	32	81	86	41	22	15	4	133	129
Denver	28	14	11	3	31	84	78	38	19	15	4	116	104
Minnesota State-Mankato	28	13	14	1	27	91	99	38	19	18	1	128	135
Michigan Tech	28	6	19	3	15	69	105	36	8	24	4	91	135
Alaska-Anchorage	28	4	20	4	12	61	104	36	7	24	5	82	132
Minnesota-Duluth	28	3	22	3	9	68	121	39	7	28	4	103	166
Championship: St. Cloud State † indicates conference regular season champion * indicates conference tournament champion Final rankings: USA Today/American Hockey Magazine Poll Top 15 Poll

== Bracket ==
Teams are reseeded after the first round

First round March 9–11, 2001
1	North Dakota	2	6	4
10	Minnesota-Duluth	3	2	0
2	St. Cloud State	5	8	–
9	Alaska-Anchorage	1	2	–
3	Minnesota	7	3	–
8	Michigan Tech	2	1	–
4	Colorado College	3	7	—
7	Minnesota State-Mankato	0	3	—
5	Wisconsin	6	6	—
6	Denver	4	2	—

Quarterfinal; March 15, 2001
4	Colorado College	4
5	Wisconsin	3

Semifinals; March 16, 2001
1	North Dakota	2
4	Colorado College	1
2	St. Cloud State	3
3	Minnesota	0

Championship; March 17, 2001
1	North Dakota	5
2	St. Cloud State	6*

Note: * denotes overtime period(s)

=== Quarterfinals ===
==== (1) North Dakota vs. (10) Minnesota-Duluth ====
March 9	North Dakota	2 – 3	Minnesota-Duluth	Ralph Engelstad Arena	Recap
No Scoring		First period	No scoring
(Notermann, Dorey) David Lundbohm - 01:13		Second period	12:17 - PP - Matt Mathias (Homstol, Lessard); 15:13 - Ryan Homstol (Gunderson, Otten)
(Dorey, Hammer) Ryan Bayda - 11:14		Third period	17:48 - GW - Mark Gunderson (Otten); 15:13 - Ryan Homstol (Gunderson, Otten)
Karl Goehring ( 24 saves / 27 shots )		Goalie stats	Rob Anderson ( 35 saves / 37 shots )

March 10	North Dakota	6 – 2	Minnesota-Duluth	Ralph Engelstad Arena	Recap
No Scoring		First period	No scoring
(Schneekloth, Roche) Jeff Panzer - PP - 08:53 (Skarperud, Spiewak) Tyler Palmiscno - 12:33 (Bayda, Panzer) Bryan Lundbohm - GW - 14:58 (Roche, Mazurak) Wes Dorey - PP - 19:13		Second period	07:01 - Mark Carlson (Reierson, Medak); 08:01 - Matt Mathias
(Skarperud, Spiewak) Aaron Schneekloth - 10:24 (Lundbohm, Notermann) Wes Dorey - 13:19		Third period	No scoring
Andy Kollar ( 19 saves / 21 shots )		Goalie stats	Rob Anderson ( 33 saves / 38 shots ) / Adam Coole ( 0 saves / 1 shots )

March 11	North Dakota	4 – 0	Minnesota-Duluth	Ralph Engelstad Arena	Recap
No Scoring		First period	No scoring
Ryan Bayda - GW - 07:31 (Skarperud, Panzer) Kevin Spiewak - 12:16		Second period	No scoring
(Dorey, Lundbohm) Jason Notermann - 03:11; Jeff Panzer - 05:27		Third period	No scoring
Karl Goehring ( 25 saves / 25 shots )		Goalie stats	Rob Anderson ( 29 saves / 33 shots ) / Adam Coole ( 5 saves / 5 shots )

North Dakota won series 2–1

==== (2) St. Cloud State vs. (9) Alaska-Anchorage ====
March 9	St. Cloud State	5 – 1	Alaska-Anchorage	National Hockey Center	Recap
Chris Purslow - 04:36 (Arnason) Brandon Sampair - GW - 17:06		First period	No scoring
(Arnason, Sampair) Mark Hartigan - PP - 15:48		Second period	No scoring
Chris Purslow - 04:52 (Arnason, Hartigan) Nate DiCasmirro - PP - 11:11		Third period	05:49 - Vladimir Novak (Gilkerson, Ludwig)
Scott Meyer ( 20 saves / 21 shots )		Goalie stats	Chris King ( 14 saves / 18 shots ) / Kevin Reiter ( 6 saves / 7 shots )

March 10	St. Cloud State	8 – 2	Alaska-Anchorage	National Hockey Center	Recap
(Motzko, Meyer) Chris Purslow - 01:16 (Eastman, Hartigan) Joe Motzko - 06:01 (Hartigan) Joe Motzko - GW - 10:48 (DiCasmirro, Arnason) Mark Hartigan - PP - 18:04		First period	19:26 - Petr Chytka (Leitner, Cygan)
(Westcott) Brandon Sampair - PP - 18:15		Second period	03:26 - Vladimir Novak (Garvin)
(Malone) Ritchie Larson - 01:16 (Westcott, DiCasmirro) Mark Hartigan - 10:53 (DiCasmirro, Finger) Ryan Malone - 14:49		Third period	No scoring
Scott Meyer ( 25 saves / 27 shots )		Goalie stats	Chris King ( 5 saves / 9 shots ) / Kevin Reiter ( 22 saves / 26 shots ))

St. Cloud State won series 2–0

==== (3) Minnesota vs. (8) Michigan Tech ====
March 9	Minnesota	7 – 2	Michigan Tech	Mariucci Arena	Recap
(Koalska, Anthony) Stuart Senden - 00:58 (Leopold, Westrum) Grant Potulny - PP - 08:55 (Pohl, Martin) Jeff Taffe - GW - 10:11 (Senden) Nick Anthony - 13:03		First period	12:34 - PP - Brett Engelhardt (Snesrud, Way)
(Martin, Miskovich) Dylan Mills - PP - 11:49		Second period	No scoring
(Westrum) Troy Riddle - 17:21 (Tharp, Westrum) Nick Angell - 18:13		Third period	16:18 - Jarrett Weinberger (Patterson)
Adam Hauser ( 16 saves / 18 shots )		Goalie stats	Brian Rodgers ( 25 saves / 32 shots )

March 10	Minnesota	3 – 1	Michigan Tech	Mariucci Arena	Recap
(Koalska, Anthony) Ben Tharp - 17:01		First period	No scoring
(Anthony, Koalska) Stuart Senden - GW - 17:12		Second period	No scoring
(Martin) Nick Anthony - 14:44		Third period	03:43 - Chris Durno (Ulwelling)
Adam Hauser ( 26 saves / 27 shots )		Goalie stats	Brian Rodgers ( 38 saves / 41 shots )

Minnesota won series 2–0

==== (4) Colorado College vs. (7) Minnesota State-Mankato ====
March 9	Colorado College	3 – 0	OT	Minnesota State-Mankato	Colorado Springs World Arena	Recap

March 10	Colorado College	7 – 3	Minnesota State-Mankato	Colorado Springs World Arena	Recap

Colorado College won series 2–0

==== (5) Wisconsin vs. (6) Denver ====
March 9	Wisconsin	6 – 4	Denver	Alliant Energy Center	Recap
(Bourque, Hukalo) Dany Heatley - 14:30 (Boeser) Matt Hussey - 15:48		First period	07:38 - PP - Ryan Caldwell (Paradise, James); 07:51 - Kelly Popadynetz (Engstrom, Hartmann); 08:29 - Max Bull (Doell, Barber)
(Brooks, Hukalo) Rene Bourque - 07:48 (Jensen, Boeser) Dany Heatley - PP - 09:37 (Heatley, Hussey) Rene Bourque - GW - 17:42		Second period	No scoring
(Bourque, Heatley) David Hukalo - PP - 06:45		Third period	19:41 - PP - Judd Stauss (Weber)
Graham Melanson ( 28 saves / 31 shots )		Goalie stats	Wade Dubielewicz ( 26 saves / 31 shots ) / Adam Berkhoel ( 10 saves / 11 shots )

March 10	Wisconsin	6 – 2	Denver	Alliant Energy Center	Recap
No Scoring		First period	No scoring
(Wheeler, Dessner) Kent Davyduke - 00:55 (Brooks, Doman) Matt Murray - 12:48 (Winchester) Dany Heatley - GW - 13:34		Second period	06:16 - Ryan Caldwell (Paradise); 07:50 - David Neale (Stauss)
(Hergert) Kevin Granato - 10:56 (Bourque, Heatley) Jeff Dessner - PP - 15:02 (Jensen) Kent Davyduke - EN - 18:49		Third period	No scoring
Graham Melanson ( 41 saves / 43 shots )		Goalie stats	Adam Berkhoel ( 19 saves / 23 shots ) / Wade Dubielewicz ( 0 saves / 1 shots )

Wisconsin won series 2–0

=== Quarterfinal ===
==== (4) Colorado College vs. (5) Wisconsin ====
March 15	Minnesota	4 – 3	Wisconsin	Xcel Energy Center	Recap
(Preissing, Manning) Joe Cullen - 04:02 (Clark, Jozsa) Noah Clarke - 14:26		First period	13:12 - Dany Heatley
No scoring		Second period	No scoring
(Cullen, Manning) Peter Sejna - 19:13 (Cullen, Sejna) Justin Morrison - GW EN - 19:25		Third period	00:53 - PP - Rene Bourque (Heatley, Hukalo); 19:49 - Dany Heatley (Granato, Brooks)
Jeff Sanger ( 37 saves / 40 shots )		Goalie stats	Graham Melanson ( 30 saves / 33 shots )

=== Semifinals ===
==== (1) North Dakota vs. (4) Colorado College ====
March 16	North Dakota	2 – 1	Colorado College	Xcel Energy Center	Recap
No Scoring		First period	04:26 - Mark Cullen (Sejna, Morrison)
(Bayda, Panzer) Aaron Schneekloth - PP - 03:27 (Dorey, Roche) Jason Notermann - GW - 10:51		Second period	No scoring
No scoring		Third period	No scoring
Karl Goehring ( 18 saves / 19 shots )		Goalie stats	Colin Zulianello ( 18 saves / 20 shots )

==== (2) St. Cloud State vs. (3) Minnesota ====
March 16	St. Cloud State	3 – 0	Minnesota	Xcel Energy Center	Recap
(Arnason, Sampair) Chris Purslow - GW - 05:07 (Arnason, Westcott) Nate DiCasmirro - 05:47		First period	No scoring
(Westcott) Tyler Arnason - SH - 09:46		Second period	No scoring
No scoring		Third period	No scoring
Scott Meyer ( 23 saves / 23 shots )		Goalie stats	Adam Hauser ( 18 saves / 21 shots )

=== Third Place ===
==== (3) Minnesota vs. (4) Colorado College ====
March 17	Minnesota	4 – 5	Colorado College	Xcel Energy Center	Recap
(Pohl) Erik Westrum - PP - 08:13 (Westrum, Leopold) Troy Riddle - 10:32		First period	06:01 - SH - Mark Cullen (Clark)
(Pohl, Leopold) Erik Westrum - 08:46		Second period	13:05 - PP - Joe Cullen (Kim, Stuart); 14:54 - PP - Mike Stuart (Morrison, Kim)
(Leopold) John Pohl - PP - 15:18		Third period	14:29 - Peter Sejna (Cullen); 16:55 - Justin Morrison
Pete Samargia ( 27 saves / 32 shots )		Goalie stats	Jeff Sanger ( 37 saves / 41 shots )

=== Championship ===
==== (1) North Dakota vs. (2) St. Cloud State ====
March 17	North Dakota	5 – 6	OT	St. Cloud State	Xcel Energy Center	Recap
No Scoring		First period		12:10 - Tyler Arnason (Westcott, Meyer)
(Bayda, Mazurak) Jeff Panzer - 05:21		Second period		08:10 - Derek Eastman (Malone, Cullen); 15:06 - PP - Joe Motzko (Anderson, Eastman); 16:06 - Tyler Arnason (DiCasmirro)
(Skarperud) Kevin Spiewak - 08:11 (Hammer, Lundbohm) Jeff Panzer - 14:25; Jason Notermann - 18:58 (Lundbohm) Travis Roche - EA - 19:49		Third period		12:24 - PP - Tyler Arnason (Sampair, Eastman)
No scoring		First overtime period		11:33 - GW - Derek Eastman (Malone, Cullen)
Andy Kollar ( 30 saves / 36 shots )		Goalie stats		Scott Meyer ( 33 saves / 38 shots )

== Tournament awards ==
=== All-Tournament Team ===
- F Jeff Panzer (North Dakota)
- F Mark Cullen (Colorado College)
- F Tyler Arnason* (St. Cloud State)
- D Duvie Westcott (St. Cloud State)
- D Travis Roche (North Dakota)
- G Scott Meyer (St. Cloud State)

* Most Valuable Player(s)

== See also ==
- Western Collegiate Hockey Association men's champions
