= 1999 WCHA men's ice hockey tournament =

1999 WCHA Men's ice hockey tournament
- Dates: March 12–20, 1999
- Teams: 10
- Finals site: Target Center; Minneapolis, Minnesota
- Champions: Denver (12th title)
- Winning coach: George Gwozdecky (1st title)
- MVP: Stephen Wagner (Denver)
- Attendance: 42,226
- WCHA Men's Ice Hockey Tournaments

The 1999 WCHA Men's Ice Hockey Tournament was the 40th conference playoff in league history and 47th season where a WCHA champion was crowned. The 1999 tournament played between March 12 and March 20, 1999, at five conference arenas and the Target Center in Minneapolis, Minnesota. By winning the tournament, Denver was awarded the Broadmoor Trophy and received the Western Collegiate Hockey Association's automatic bid to the 1999 NCAA Men's Division I Ice Hockey Tournament.

== Format ==
The first round of the postseason tournament featured a best-of-three games format. All nine conference teams participated in the tournament as did Mankato State which was slated to join the WCHA as a full member the following year. Teams were seeded No. 1 through No. 9 according to their final conference standing, with a tiebreaker system used to seed teams with an identical number of points accumulated while Mankato State was seeded tenth. The top five seeded teams each earned home ice and hosted one of the lower seeded teams.

The winners of the first round series advanced to the Target Center for the WCHA Final Five, the collective name for the quarterfinal, semifinal, and championship rounds. The Final Five uses a single-elimination format. Teams were re-seeded No. 1 through No. 5 according to the final regular season conference standings, with the top three teams automatically advancing to the semifinals.

=== Conference standings ===
Note: GP = Games played; W = Wins; L = Losses; T = Ties; PTS = Points; GF = Goals For; GA = Goals Against

1998–99 Western Collegiate Hockey Association standings
	Conference							Overall					
	GP	W	L	T	PTS	GF	GA	GP	W	L	T	GF	GA
#5 North Dakota†	28	24	2	2	50	142	76	40	32	6	2	199	104
#6 Colorado College	28	20	8	0	40	103	68	42	29	12	1	169	111
#8 Denver*	28	15	11	2	32	101	95	41	26	13	2	154	126
Wisconsin	28	13	12	3	29	76	81	38	15	19	4	98	110
Minnesota	28	10	12	6	26	90	99	43	15	19	9	139	157
Alaska-Anchorage	28	10	13	5	25	57	71	36	13	18	5	74	92
St. Cloud State	28	8	16	4	20	79	95	39	16	18	5	122	122
Michigan Tech	28	9	19	0	18	67	99	38	9	28	1	86	145
Minnesota-Duluth	28	4	20	4	12	71	102	38	7	27	4	100	139
Championship: Denver † indicates conference regular season champion * indicates conference tournament champion Final rankings: USA Today/American Hockey Magazine Coaches Poll Top 10 Poll

== Bracket ==
Teams are reseeded after the first round

First round March 12–14, 1999
1	North Dakota	2	3	10
10	Mankato State	3*	2	0
2	Colorado College	3	5*	—
9	Minnesota-Duluth	1	4	—
3	Denver	2	4	—
8	Michigan Tech	1	2	—
4	Wisconsin	2	2	—
7	St. Cloud State	5	3	—
5	Minnesota	4	1	—
6	Alaska-Anchorage	0	0	—

Quarterfinal; March 18, 1999
5	Minnesota	5
7	St. Cloud State	3

Semifinals; March 19, 1999
1	North Dakota	6
5	Minnesota	2
2	Colorado College	2
3	Denver	3*

Championship; March 20, 1999
1	North Dakota	3
3	Denver	4

Note: * denotes overtime period(s)

=== First round ===
==== (1) North Dakota vs. (10) Mankato State ====
March 12	North Dakota	2 – 3	OT	Mankato State	Ralph Engelstad Arena
Peter Armbrust - 19:04		First period		02:01 - Ryan Schrick; 08:43 - Tim Wolfe
Mike Commodore - 08:46		Second period		No scoring
No scoring		Third period		No scoring
No scoring		First overtime period		05:14 - GW - Andy Fermoyle
Karl Goehring ( 26 saves / 29 shots )		Goalie stats		Eric Pateman ( 44 saves / 46 shots )

March 13	North Dakota	3 – 2	Mankato State	Ralph Engelstad Arena
No Scoring		First period	01:31 - Tyler Baines
Jason Blake - 00:49; Lee Goren - 13:46; Brad Defauw - GW - 14:05		Second period	No scoring
No scoring		Third period	15:25 - Peter Holoien
Karl Goehring ( 28 saves / 30 shots )		Goalie stats	Eric Pateman ( 39 saves / 42 shots )

March 14	North Dakota	10 – 0	Mankato State	Ralph Engelstad Arena
Jeff Panzer - GW PP - 07:30; Adam Calder - 09:44; Jesse Bull - 14:45; Jason Blake - 15:18		First period	No scoring
Jeff Panzer - 05:58; Peter Armbrust - 13:12; Brad Williamson - 13:38		Second period	No scoring
Brad Williamson - PP - 01:04; Jason Blake - 03:14; Wes Dorey - 03:38		Third period	No scoring
Karl Goehring ( 23 saves / 23 shots )		Goalie stats	Eric Pateman ( 29 saves / 35 shots ) / Todd Kelzenberg ( 27 saves / 31 shots )

North Dakota won series 2–1

==== (2) Colorado College vs. (9) Minnesota-Duluth ====
March 12	Colorado College	3 – 1	Minnesota-Duluth	Colorado Springs World Arena
No Scoring		First period	No scoring
No scoring		Second period	No scoring
Jon Austin - 11:38; Justin Morrison - GW PP - 15:51; Jon Austin - EN - 19:57		Third period	17:25 - Shawn Pogreba
Jeff Sanger ( 22 saves / 23 shots )		Goalie stats	Brant Nicklin ( 37 saves / 39 shots )

March 13	Colorado College	5 – 4	OT	Minnesota-Duluth	Colorado Springs World Arena
Justin Morrison - 10:15; Trent Clark - 10:58		First period		No scoring
Cam Kryway - 09:00		Second period		03:01 - Ryan Nosan; 03:01 - SH - Jeff Scissons
Scott Swanson - PP - 00:58		Third period		13:20 - PP - Andy Reierson; 19:18 - Jesse Fibiger
Brian Swanson - GW - 06:17		First overtime period		No scoring
Jeff Sanger ( 31 saves / 35 shots )		Goalie stats		Brant Nicklin ( 44 saves / 49 shots )

Colorado College won series 2–0

==== (3) Denver vs. (8) Michigan Tech ====
March 12	Denver	2 – 1	Michigan Tech	Denver Coliseum
No Scoring		First period	No scoring
Bryce Wallnutt - 07:21; Bjorn Engstrom - GW - 08:33		Second period	00:27 - Devin Hartnell
No scoring		Third period	No scoring
Stephen Wagner ( 18 saves / 19 shots )		Goalie stats	David Weninger ( 33 saves / 35 shots )

March 13	Denver	4 – 2	Michigan Tech	Denver Coliseum
James Petterson - PP - 00:48		First period	No scoring
Paul Veres - 04:47		Second period	11:35 - PP - Mat Snesrud; 19:31 - Matt Ulwelling
Bjorn Engstrom - GW - 08:32; Joe Ritson - EN - 19:31		Third period	No scoring
Stephen Wagner ( 17 saves / 19 shots )		Goalie stats	David Weninger ( 26 saves / 29 shots )

Denver won series 2–0

==== (4) Wisconsin vs. (7) St. Cloud State ====
March 10	Wisconsin	2 – 5	St. Cloud State	Kohl Center
No Scoring		First period	06:03 - PP - Jason Goulet; 12:28 - Matt Noga
Dave Tanabe - PP - 02:37; Dustin Kuk - 19:15		Second period	04:47 - GW - Ryan Forbes; 17:02 - PP - Jason Goulet
No scoring		Third period	19:27 - EN - George Awada
Graham Melanson ( 28 saves / 32 shots )		Goalie stats	Dean Weasler ( 36 saves / 38 shots )

March 14	Wisconsin	2 – 3	St. Cloud State	Kohl Center
No Scoring		First period	No scoring
Steven Reinprecht - PP - 17:11		Second period	10:44 - Tyler Arnason; 13:11 - SH - Tyler Arnason
Kevin Granato - 10:19		Third period	11:45 - GW - George Awada
Graham Melanson ( 29 saves / 32 shots )		Goalie stats	Dean Weasler ( 30 saves / 32 shots ))

St. Cloud State won series 2–0

==== (5) Minnesota vs. (6) Alaska-Anchorage ====
March 12	Minnesota	4 – 0	Alaska-Anchorage	Mariucci Arena
Aaron Miskovich - GW - 10:53		First period	No scoring
John Pohl - 03:05		Second period	No scoring
Mike Anderson - 11:34; Erik Wendell - 15:14		Third period	No scoring
Adam Hauser ( 26 saves / 26 shots )		Goalie stats	Gregg Naumenko ( 29 saves / 33 shots )

March 13	Minnesota	1 – 0	Alaska-Anchorage	Mariucci Arena
Rico Pagel - GW - 19:02		First period	No scoring
No scoring		Second period	No scoring
No scoring		Third period	No scoring
Adam Hauser ( 17 saves / 17 shots )		Goalie stats	Gregg Naumenko ( 31 saves / 32 shots )

Minnesota won series 2–0

=== Quarterfinal ===
==== (5) Minnesota vs. (7) St. Cloud State ====
March 18	Minnesota	5 – 3	St. Cloud State	Target Center
Wyatt Smith - 00:09; Dave Spehar - 15:10		First period	No scoring
Reggie Berg - PP - 16:29		Second period	15:47 - PP - George Awada
Dave Spehar - GW - 06:39; Reggie Berg - EN - 19:06		Third period	10:29 - George Awada; 12:00 - Matt Bailey
Adam Hauser ( 36 saves / 39 shots )		Goalie stats	Dean Weasler ( 33 saves / 37 shots )

=== Semifinals ===
==== (1) North Dakota vs. (5) Minnesota ====
March 19	North Dakota	6 – 2	Minnesota	Target Center
Jason Blake - 01:06; Jeff Panzer - 12:07		First period	No scoring
Jeff Panzer - GW PP - 01:22; Jason Ulmer - 05:41; Brad Defauw - PP - 13:16; Brad Williamson - PP - 17:36		Second period	04:33 - PP - Erik Wendell; 12:05 - PP - Reggie Berg
No scoring		Third period	No scoring
Karl Goehring ( 40 saves / 42 shots )		Goalie stats	Adam Hauser ( 34 saves / 39 shots ) / Rob LaRue ( 0 saves / 1 shots )

==== (2) Colorado College vs. (3) Denver ====
March 19	Colorado College	2 – 3	OT	Denver	Target Center
K.J. Voorhees - 03:26; Justin Morrison - SH - 07:19		First period		09:19 - Jon Newman; 18:56 - Paul Comrie
No scoring		Second period		No scoring
No scoring		Third period		No scoring
No scoring		First overtime period		08:38 - GW - Paul Veres
Jeff Sanger ( 33 saves / 36 shots )		Goalie stats		Stephen Wagner ( 39 saves / 41 shots )

=== Third Place ===
==== (2) Colorado College vs. (5) Minnesota ====
March 20	Colorado College	7 – 4	Minnesota	Target Center
Scott Swanson - PP - 04:57; Mike Stuart - PP - 08:46		First period	06:06 - PP - John Pohl
Justin Morrison - 00:43; Justin Morrison - 06:06; Cam Kryway - GW - 11:31; Jesse Heerema - 12:33		Second period	03:29 - Mike Anderson; 05:19 - PP - Dave Spehar
Justin Morrison - EN - 19:30		Third period	09:30 - PP - Aaron Miskovich
Colin Zulianello ( 25 saves / 29 shots )		Goalie stats	Adam Hauser ( 7 saves / 10 shots ) / Rob LaRue ( 20 saves / 23 shots )

=== Championship ===
==== (1) North Dakota vs. (3) Denver ====
March 20	North Dakota	3 – 4	Denver	Target Center
Peter Armbrust - 03:36; Jeff Ulmer - 17:43		First period	09:54 - PP - Paul Comrie
Brad Defauw - 05:57		Second period	08:01 - PP - Paul Veres; 14:35 - Joe Ritson
No scoring		Third period	04:46 - GW - Shawn Kurulak
Karl Goehring ( 28 saves / 31 shots )		Goalie stats	Stephen Wagner ( 33 saves / 35 shots )

== Tournament awards ==
=== All-Tournament Team ===
- F Justin Morrison (Colorado College)
- F Jeff Panzer (North Dakota)
- F Paul Veres (Denver)
- D Erik Westrum (Minnesota)
- D Joe Ritson (Denver)
- G Stephen Wagner* (Denver)

* Most Valuable Player(s)

== See also ==
- Western Collegiate Hockey Association men's champions
