= 2002 WCHA men's ice hockey tournament =

2002 WCHA Men's ice hockey tournament
- Dates: March 8–16, 2002
- Teams: 10
- Finals site: Xcel Energy Center; St. Paul, Minnesota
- Champions: Denver (13th title)
- Winning coach: George Gwozdecky (5th title)
- MVP: Wade Dubielewicz (Denver)
- Attendance: 75,151
- WCHA Men's Ice Hockey Tournaments

The 2002 WCHA Men's Ice Hockey Tournament was the 43rd conference playoff in league history and 49th season where a WCHA champion was crowned. The 2002 tournament was played between March 8 and March 16, 2002, at five conference arenas and the Xcel Energy Center in St. Paul, Minnesota, the home of the NHL's Minnesota Wild. By winning the tournament, Denver was awarded the Broadmoor Trophy and received the Western Collegiate Hockey Association's automatic bid to the 2002 NCAA Men's Division I Ice Hockey Tournament.

== Format ==
The first round of the postseason tournament featured a best-of-three games format. All ten conference schools participated in the tournament with teams seeded No. 1 through No. 10 according to their final conference standing, with a tiebreaker system used to seed teams with an identical number of points accumulated. The top five seeded teams each earned home ice and hosted one of the lower seeded teams.

The winners of the first round series advanced to the Xcel Energy Center for the WCHA Final Five, the collective name for the quarterfinal, semifinal, and championship rounds. The Final Five uses a single-elimination format. Teams were re-seeded No. 1 through No. 5 according to the final regular season conference standings, with the top three teams automatically advancing to the semifinals.

=== Conference standings ===
Note: GP = Games played; W = Wins; L = Losses; T = Ties; PTS = Points; GF = Goals For; GA = Goals Against

2001–02 Western Collegiate Hockey Association standings
	Conference							Overall					
	GP	W	L	T	PTS	GF	GA	GP	W	L	T	GF	GA
#5 Denver†*	28	21	6	1	43	108	63	41	32	8	1	158	86
#10 St. Cloud State	28	19	7	2	40	117	65	42	29	11	2	179	99
#1 Minnesota	28	18	7	3	39	113	84	44	32	8	4	197	119
#7 Colorado College	28	16	10	2	34	95	74	43	27	13	3	147	97
Wisconsin	28	12	13	3	27	88	90	39	16	19	4	123	120
Minnesota State-Mankato	28	11	15	2	24	84	107	38	16	20	2	124	138
Alaska-Anchorage	28	10	14	4	24	79	96	36	12	19	5	99	125
North Dakota	28	11	15	2	24	103	100	37	16	19	2	134	136
Minnesota-Duluth	28	6	19	3	15	72	112	40	13	24	3	119	153
Michigan Tech	28	4	22	2	10	66	134	38	8	28	2	92	177
Championship: Denver † indicates conference regular season champion * indicates conference tournament champion Final rankings: USA Today/American Hockey Magazine Poll Top 15 Poll

== Bracket ==
Teams are reseeded after the first round

First round March 8–9
1	Denver	5	8	–
10	Michigan Tech	1	1	–
2	St. Cloud State	5*	6	–
9	Minnesota-Duluth	4	3	–
3	Minnesota	7	4*	–
8	North Dakota	4	3	–
4	Colorado College	6	1	—
7	Alaska-Anchorage	1	0	—
5	Wisconsin	3*	7	—
6	Minnesota State-Mankato	2	3	—

Quarterfinal; March 14
4	Colorado College	3*
5	Wisconsin	2

Semifinals; March 15
1	Denver	3
4	Colorado College	0
2	St. Cloud State	1
3	Minnesota	4

Championship; March 16
1	Denver	5
3	Minnesota	2

Note: * denotes overtime period(s)

=== First round ===
==== (1) Denver vs. (10) Michigan Tech ====
March 8	Denver	5 – 1	Michigan Tech	Magness Arena	Recap
(Fulghum, Bull) Greg Keith - 15:19 (Bull, MacKenzie) Jussi Halme - GW - 19:36		First period	No scoring
(Adams) Chris Paradise - 19:05		Second period	15:10 - Frank Werner (Markham)
(James, Vines) Chris Paradise - 04:07 (Foster, Weber) David Neale - 17:16		Third period	No scoring
Wade Dubielewicz ( 13 saves / 14 shots )		Goalie stats	Cam Ellsworth ( 35 saves / 40 shots )

March 9	Denver	8 – 1	Michigan Tech	Magness Arena	Recap
(Foster, Paradise) Connor James - 07:54 (Weber, Dubielewicz) David Neale - GW - 11:26		First period	No scoring
(Ulanski, MacKenzie) Lukas Dora - 00:18 (Doell, James) Greg Barber - 04:31 (Caldwell, Foster) Chris Paradise - PP - 13:25		Second period	No scoring
(Foster, Neale) Matt Weber - 08:53 (Foster) David Neale - 10:36 (Caldwell, Ulanski) Kevin Doell - PP - 19:56		Third period	18:39 - Colin Murphy
Wade Dubielewicz ( 18 saves / 18 shots ) / Andy Lemelin ( 0 saves / 1 shots )		Goalie stats	Cam Ellsworth ( 23 saves / 31 shots )

Denver won series 2–0

==== (2) St. Cloud State vs. (9) Minnesota-Duluth ====
March 8	St. Cloud State	5 – 4	OT	Minnesota-Duluth	National Hockey Center	Recap
No Scoring		First period		18:15 - Drew Otten (Petruic, Nelson)
(Doyle, Iannazzo) Peter Szabo - 01:45 (DiCasmirro, Hartigan) Joe Motzko - PP - 11:23 (Cullen, Motzko) Mark Hartigan - PP - 11:56		Second period		04:20 - Drew Otten (Francisco, Geisler); 12:14 - Andy Reierson (Nelson, Anderson)
(Motzko, Eastman) Matt Gens - 11:02		Third period		16:52 - Mark Carlson (Geisler, Francisco)
(Malone, Cullen) Matt Gens - GW - 17:39		First overtime period		No scoring
Dean Weasler ( 36 saves / 40 shots )		Goalie stats		Rob Anderson ( 31 saves / 37 shots )

March 9	St. Cloud State	6 – 3	Minnesota-Duluth	National Hockey Center	Recap
(Meyer, Brooks) Ryan Malone - 03:50 (Hartigan, Finger) Joe Cullen - PP - 06:09 (DiCasmirro, LaMere) Mark Hartigan - 17:07		First period	18:44 - Junior Lessard (Nelson, Geisler)
(Hartigan, Motzko) Joe Cullen - GW - 07:33		Second period	No scoring
(Hartigan, Motzko) Nate DiCasmirro - PP - 10:26 (DiCasmirro, Gens) Mark Hartigan - PP - 15:17		Third period	08:40 - PP - Mark Carlson (Hambly, Geisler); 18:44 - PP - Judd Medak (Francisco, Reierson)
Jake Moreland ( 26 saves / 29 shots )		Goalie stats	Rob Anderson ( 20 saves / 26 shots )

St. Cloud State won series 2–0

==== (3) Minnesota vs. (8) North Dakota ====
March 8	Minnesota	7 – 2	North Dakota	Mariucci Arena	Recap
(Anthony, Riddle) John Pohl - 02:17 (Anthony, Pohl) Troy Riddle - 04:57		First period	No scoring
(Riddle, Pohl) Nick Anthony - GW - 00:18 (Koalska, Wendell) Barry Tallackson - 02:59 (Leopold, Martin) John Pohl - PP - 04:02 (Welch, Taffe) Keith Ballard - 06:08		Second period	11:28 - Tim Skarperud
(Potulny) Jeff Taffe - 10:42		Third period	16:45 - Rory McMahon (Hale)
Adam Hauser ( 21 saves / 23 shots )		Goalie stats	Josh Siembida ( 24 saves / 30 shots ) / Andy Kollar ( 15 saves / 16 shots )

March 9	Minnesota	4 – 3	OT	North Dakota	Mariucci Arena	Recap
No Scoring		First period		01:10 - SH - Rory McMahon (Hale)
(Martin) Dan Welch - 01:15 (Taffe, Welch) Jordan Leopold - 12:02		Second period		19:46 - Ryan Bayda
Jeff Taffe - 07:21		Third period		18:53 - EA PP - Chad Mazurak (Bayda, Lundbohm)
(Tallackson) Keith Ballard - GW - 18:36		First overtime period		No scoring
Adam Hauser ( 30 saves / 33 shots )		Goalie stats		Andy Kollar ( 48 saves / 52 shots )

Minnesota won series 2–0

==== (4) Minnesota State vs. (7) Alaska-Anchorage ====
March 8	Colorado College	6 – 1	Alaska-Anchorage	Colorado Springs World Arena
(Preissing, Kim) Peter Sejna - PP - 17:59		First period	No scoring
(Sejna, Preissing) Jesse Heerema - GW - 13:31 (Clarke, Liebel) Alex Kim - 15:36		Second period	10:11 - Ryan Young
(Cullen) Jesse Heerema - 00:39; Noah Clarke - 01:14 (Cullen, Clarke) Peter Sejna - 08:01		Third period	No scoring
Jeff Sanger ( 21 saves / 22 shots )		Goalie stats	Kevin Reiter ( 39 saves / 45 shots )

March 9	Colorado College	1 – 0	Alaska-Anchorage	Colorado Springs World Arena
(Kim, Clarke) Tom Preissing - GW - 10:51		First period	No scoring
No scoring		Second period	No scoring
No scoring		Third period	No scoring
Jeff Sanger ( 16 saves / 16 shots )		Goalie stats	Chris King ( 31 saves / 32 shots )

Colorado College won series 2–0

==== (5) Wisconsin vs. (6) Minnesota State-Mankato ====
March 8	Wisconsin	3 – 2	OT	Minnesota State-Mankato	Alliant Energy Center	Recap
No scoring		First period		02:40 – Grant Stevenson (Sorenson, Paluczak)
(Jensen, Boeser) John Eichelberger – 10:42 (Davyduke, Krall) Matt Hussey – 16:36		Second period		No scoring
No scoring		Third period		17:32 – Cole Bassett (Jackman)
(Hussey, Boeser) Matt Murray		First overtime period		No scoring
Scott Kabotoff (28 saves / 30 shots)		Goalie stats		Jason Jensen (38 saves / 41 shots)

March 9	Wisconsin	7 – 3	Minnesota State-Mankato	Alliant Energy Center	Recap

Wisconsin won series 2–0

=== Quarterfinal ===
==== (4) Colorado College vs. (5) Wisconsin ====
March 14	Minnesota	3 – 2	Wisconsin	Xcel Energy Center	Recap
(Cullen) Colin Stuart - 17:35		First period	No scoring
No scoring		Second period	03:49 - Rene Bourque (Leavitt, Boeser)
(Stuart, Cullen) Chris Hartsburg - 14:49		Third period	18:29 - Matt Doman (Davyduke, Wozniewski)
(Cullen) Peter Sejna - GW - 00:53		Overtime	No scoring
Jeff Sanger ( 25 saves / 27 shots )		Goalie stats	Scott Kabotoff ( 17 saves / 20 shots )

=== Semifinals ===
==== (1) Denver vs. (4) Colorado College ====
March 15	Denver	3 – 0	Colorado College	Xcel Energy Center	Recap
(Ulanski, Dora) Chris Paradise - GW - 08:38		First period	No scoring
Greg Keith - 14:10		Second period	No scoring
(Ulanski) Chris Paradise - 12:10		Third period	No scoring
Wade Dubielewicz ( 26 saves / 26 shots )		Goalie stats	Jeff Sanger ( 26 saves / 29 shots )

==== (2) St. Cloud State vs. (3) Minnesota ====
March 15	St. Cloud State	1 – 4	Minnesota	Xcel Energy Center	Recap
No Scoring		First period	00:55 - Jordan Leopold (Riddle, Pohl)
No scoring		Second period	19:43 - GW - Troy Riddle (Pohl, Fleming)
(Szabo, Eastman) Ryan Malone - PP - 11:32		Third period	00:35 - Jeff Taffe (DeMarchi, Leopold); 07:03 - PP - Matt Koalska (Riddle, Tallackson)
Jake Moreland ( 22 saves / 26 shots ) / Dean Weasler ( 7 saves / 7 shots )		Goalie stats	Adam Hauser ( 26 saves / 27 shots )

=== Third Place ===
==== (2) St. Cloud State vs. (4) Colorado College ====
March 16	St. Cloud State	1 – 2	Colorado College	Xcel Energy Center	Recap
(Hendricks, Cullen) Colin Peters - 05:02		First period	06:39 - Richard Petiot (Sejna, Heerema)
No scoring		Second period	03:48 - GW PP - Chris Hartsburg (Stuart, Canzanello)
No scoring		Third period	No scoring
Dean Weasler ( 23 saves / 25 shots )		Goalie stats	Jeff Sanger ( 35 saves / 36 shots )

=== Championship ===
==== (1) Denver vs. (3) Minnesota ====
March 16	Denver	5 – 2	Minnesota	Xcel Energy Center	Recap
(Caldwell, Paradise) David Neale - PP - 03:32		First period	No scoring
(Cook, Dora) Kevin Ulanski - 01:29; Max Bull - GW - 04:03		Second period	02:29 - Keith Ballard (Tallackson, Koalska); 13:38 - Troy Riddle (Angell, Tallackson)
(James, Doell) Greg Barber - 08:11 (Barber) Kevin Doell - EN - 19:15		Third period	No scoring
Wade Dubielewicz ( 38 saves / 40 shots )		Goalie stats	Adam Hauser ( 22 saves / 26 shots )

== Tournament awards ==
=== All-Tournament Team ===
- F Troy Riddle (Minnesota)
- F Chris Paradise (Denver)
- F Mark Cullen (Colorado College)
- D Jordan Leopold (Minnesota)
- D Ryan Caldwell (Denver)
- G Wade Dubielewicz* (Denver)

* Most Valuable Player(s)

== See also ==
- Western Collegiate Hockey Association men's champions
