= Jordan Leopold =

American ice hockey player (born 1980)

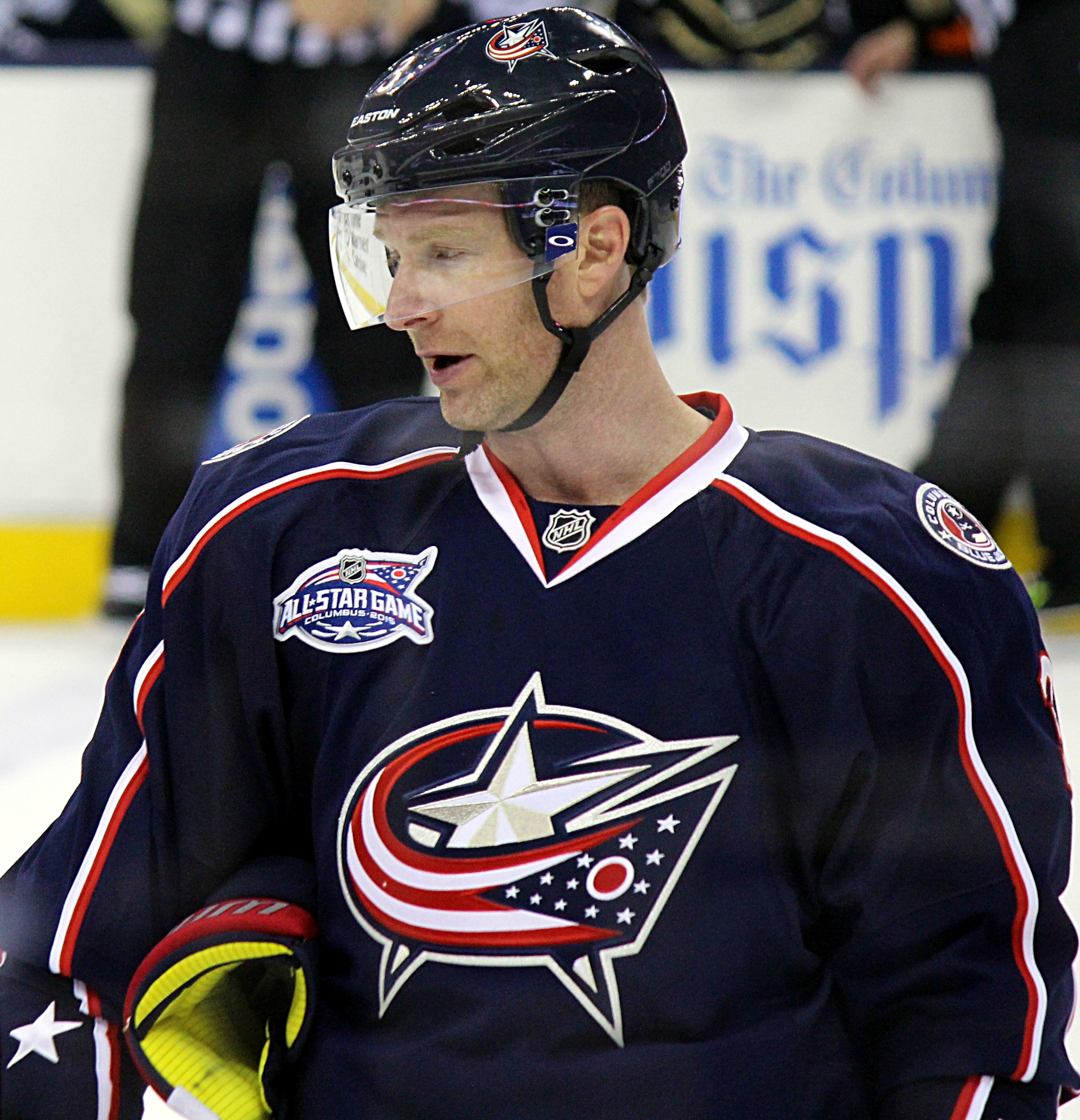
- Leopold with the Columbus Blue Jackets in 2014
- Born: August 3, 1980 (age 46) Golden Valley, Minnesota, U.S.
- Height: 6 ft 1 in (185 cm)
- Weight: 200 lb (91 kg; 14 st 4 lb)
- Position: Defense
- Shot: Left
- Played for: Calgary Flames; Colorado Avalanche; Florida Panthers; Pittsburgh Penguins; Buffalo Sabres; St. Louis Blues; Columbus Blue Jackets; Minnesota Wild
- National team: United States
- NHL draft: 44th overall, 1999; Mighty Ducks of Anaheim
- Playing career: 2002–2015

Jordan Douglas Leopold (born August 3, 1980) is an American former professional ice hockey defenseman. He was the 2002 Hobey Baker award winner. He was drafted in the second round, 44th overall, by the Mighty Ducks of Anaheim in 1999, though never making an appearance with the team. In his NHL career, Leopold played for the Calgary Flames, Colorado Avalanche, Florida Panthers, Pittsburgh Penguins, Buffalo Sabres, St. Louis Blues, Columbus Blue Jackets and Minnesota Wild.

== Playing career ==
=== Junior/Collegiate ===
Prior to joining the NHL, Leopold played for the Armstrong Falcons of Plymouth, Minnesota, and went on to play collegiate hockey with the University of Minnesota from 1998 until 2002, where he helped the Golden Gophers win an NCAA national championship despite pressure to leave the University early to play in the NHL. After his first year with Minnesota, scoring 23 points, Leopold was drafted in the 1999 NHL entry draft in the second round, 44th overall, by the Mighty Ducks of Anaheim as a prospective offensive defenseman. After completing his sophomore season with the Golden Gophers, Leopold became the property of the Calgary Flames, traded by the Mighty Ducks in exchange for Andrei Nazarov and a second-round draft pick. In 2001–02, his final season with the University of Minnesota, he won the Hobey Baker Award for being the season's outstanding player in college hockey. He also played for the US in the World Championships that year.

=== Professional ===
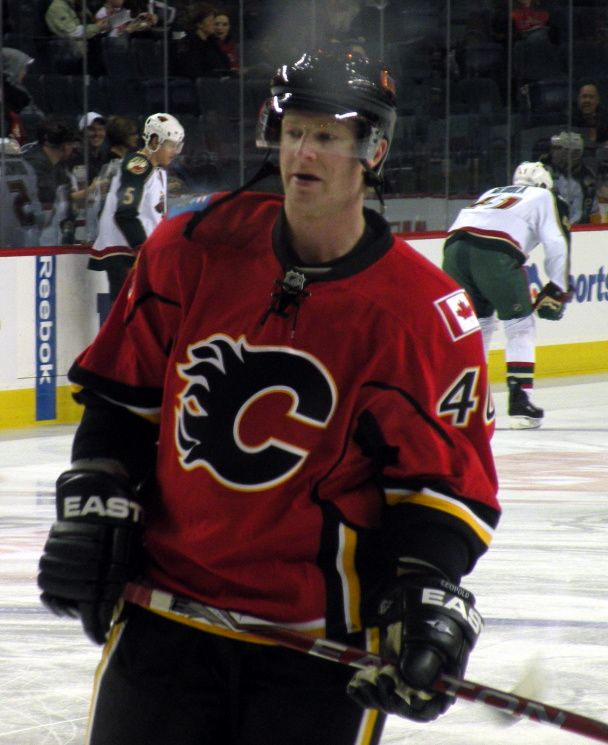
Leopold with the Flames during the 2008–09 season

Leopold started his professional career in the NHL in 2002. He played 58 games for the Calgary Flames and scored four goals and 14 points. In his second season, Leopold would play in all 82 regular season games, scoring 33 points as well as contributing to the Flames' playoff run to the 2004 Stanley Cup Finals, play which earned him a spot in the defense of the American national team for the 2005 World Championships as well as for the 2006 Winter Olympics.

After one more season with the Flames, Leopold was traded to the Colorado Avalanche at the 2006 NHL entry draft. Leopold's first season with the Avalanche, in 2006–07, was all but wiped out due to injury. Having missed the first 25 games of the season recovering from hernia surgery, he then suffered a groin injury on December 11, 2006, ruling him out for another 17 games. Just a month later, Leopold was injured again, fracturing his wrist on February 17, 2007, effectively missing the rest of the season, and playing in just 15 games. At season's end, Leopold was re-signed by the Avalanche to a two-year contract on May 22, 2007.

In the 2007–08 season, Leopold was again struck down by another injury-plagued season. Throughout the course of the season, he missed 35 games with a hip ailment, lacerated leg and pneumonia. He also suffered a concussion when he was hit high by Steve Ott on March 9, 2008. Ott was subsequently suspended for three games.

Leopold recovered to full health in time for the 2008–09 season. He played in every game with the Avalanche until the NHL trade deadline, when he was traded back to the Calgary Flames for Lawrence Nycholat, prospect Ryan Wilson and a second-round draft pick. Leopold then played all 19 games for the Flames, becoming the first Flames player to play 83 games of an 82-game season, a feat that Ian White would repeat in 2010.

On June 27, 2009, as an impending free agent, Leopold's negotiation rights were traded by the Flames to the Florida Panthers, for the negotiation rights of Jay Bouwmeester, at the 2009 NHL entry draft. After testing free-agency, Leopold signed a one-year contract with the Panthers on July 2, 2009.

In the 2009–10 season, Leopold scored seven goals and 18 points in 61 games with the Panthers. On March 1, 2010, he was then traded to the Pittsburgh Penguins for a second-round draft pick in the 2010 NHL entry draft. On April 16, 2010, in Game 2 of a playoff series between the Penguins and the Ottawa Senators, Leopold's series was ended by a devastating hit from Senators defenseman Andy Sutton. Leopold, who had a history of concussion injuries, remained unconscious on the ice for several minutes. Leopold later returned to the Pens' lineup for Game 2 of the Eastern Conference Semi-final matchup against the Montreal Canadiens.

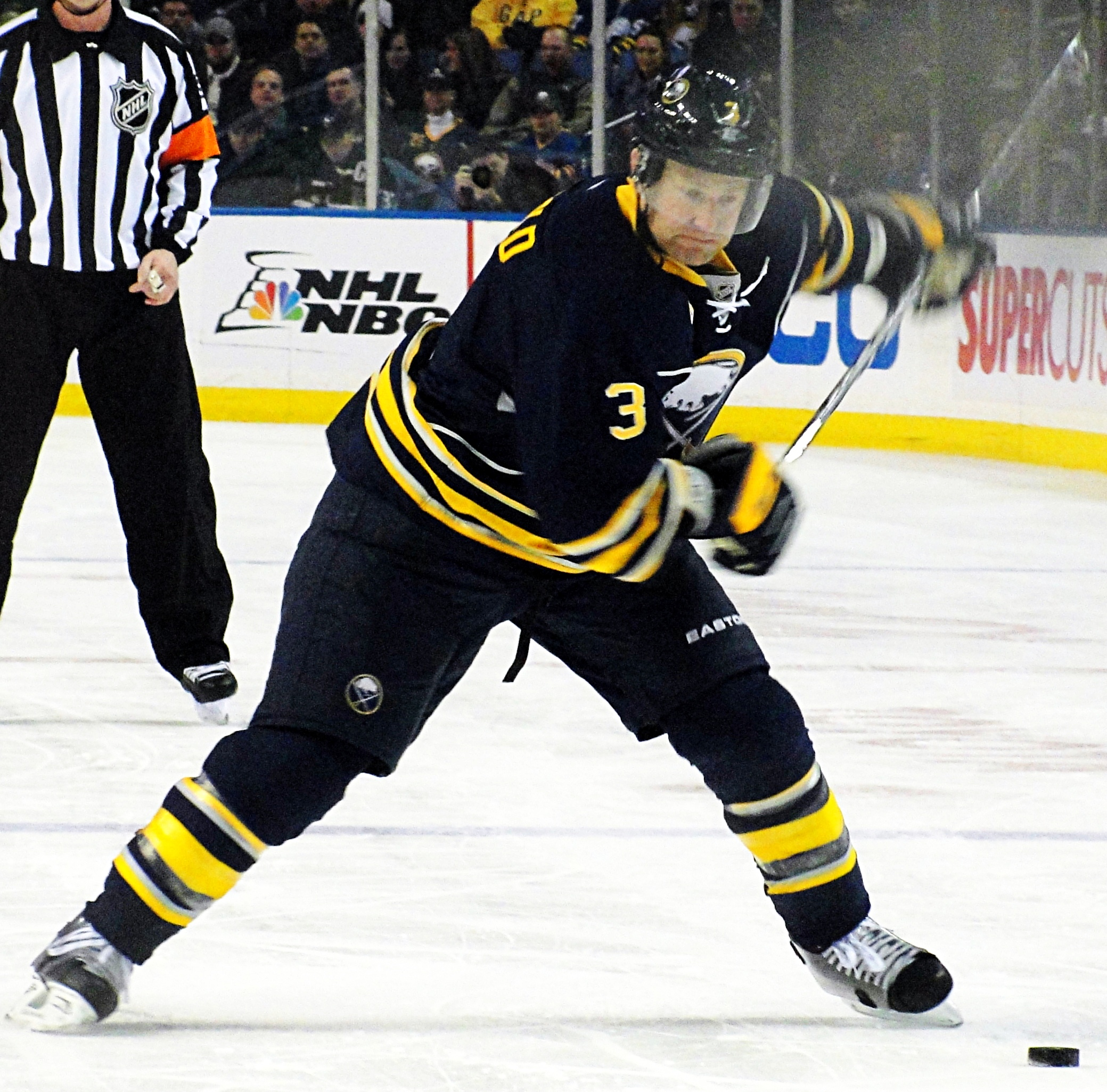
Leopold with the Sabres in 2012

On July 1, 2010, Leopold left the Penguins as a free agent and signed a three-year contract with the Buffalo Sabres.

In the final year of his contract with the Sabres, during the lockout-shortened 2012–13 season, he was traded to the St. Louis Blues in exchange for a second-round pick and a conditional fifth-round pick in the 2013 NHL entry draft on March 30, 2013.

In the 2014–15 season, with limited playing time in St. Louis, on November 15, 2014, Leopold was traded from the Blues to the Columbus Blue Jackets in exchange for a fifth-round draft pick in 2016. Leopold played 18 games with the Blue Jackets, registering one goal and two assists, before he joined his third team in the year when he was dealt to the Minnesota Wild in exchange for Justin Falk and a fifth-round pick in 2015 on March 2, 2015.

== Personal life ==
Leopold and his wife Jamie have three daughters and a son. Leopold's trade to the Minnesota Wild, marking a return to his home state, gained the attention of media outlets after it was revealed that one of his daughters wrote a letter to the Minnesota Wild coaching staff asking for them to trade for Jordan to be closer to family. He now owns and runs a wedding venue, Leopold's Mississippi Gardens, in Brooklyn Park, Minnesota.

== Career statistics ==
=== Regular season and playoffs ===
			Regular season					Playoffs
Season	Team	League	GP	G	A	Pts	PIM	GP	G	A	Pts	PIM
1995–96	Robbinsdale Armstrong High School	HS-MN	19	11	14	25	30	—	—	—	—	—
1996–97	Robbinsdale Armstrong High School	HS-MN	30	24	36	60	—	—	—	—	—	—
1997–98	USNTDP U18	USHL	19	2	4	6	6	—	—	—	—	—
1997–98	USNTDP U18	NAHL	16	2	5	7	8	—	—	—	—	—
1997–98	USNTDP U18	USDP	25	7	3	10	2	—	—	—	—	—
1998–99	University of Minnesota	WCHA	39	7	16	23	20	—	—	—	—	—
1999–2000	University of Minnesota	WCHA	39	6	18	24	20	—	—	—	—	—
2000–01	University of Minnesota	WCHA	42	12	37	49	38	—	—	—	—	—
2001–02	University of Minnesota	WCHA	44	20	28	48	28	—	—	—	—	—
2002–03	Saint John Flames	AHL	3	1	2	3	0	—	—	—	—	—
2002–03	Calgary Flames	NHL	58	4	10	14	12	—	—	—	—	—
2003–04	Calgary Flames	NHL	82	9	24	33	24	26	0	10	10	6
2005–06	Calgary Flames	NHL	74	2	18	20	68	7	0	1	1	4
2006–07	Colorado Avalanche	NHL	15	2	3	5	14	—	—	—	—	—
2007–08	Colorado Avalanche	NHL	43	5	8	13	20	7	0	3	3	0
2008–09	Colorado Avalanche	NHL	64	6	14	20	18	—	—	—	—	—
2008–09	Calgary Flames	NHL	19	1	3	4	6	6	0	1	1	8
2009–10	Florida Panthers	NHL	61	7	11	18	22	—	—	—	—	—
2009–10	Pittsburgh Penguins	NHL	20	4	4	8	6	8	0	0	0	2
2010–11	Buffalo Sabres	NHL	71	13	22	35	36	5	0	1	1	4
2011–12	Buffalo Sabres	NHL	79	10	14	24	28	—	—	—	—	—
2012–13	Buffalo Sabres	NHL	24	2	6	8	14	—	—	—	—	—
2012–13	St. Louis Blues	NHL	15	0	2	2	0	6	0	0	0	0
2013–14	St. Louis Blues	NHL	27	1	5	6	6	6	0	1	1	2
2014–15	St. Louis Blues	NHL	7	0	0	0	2	—	—	—	—	—
2014–15	Columbus Blue Jackets	NHL	18	1	2	3	9	—	—	—	—	—
2014–15	Minnesota Wild	NHL	18	0	1	1	8	9	0	0	0	0
NHL totals			695	67	147	214	293	80	0	17	17	26

=== International ===
Year	Team	Event	Result	GP	G	A	Pts	PIM
1999	United States	WJC	8th	6	0	1	1	0
2000	United States	WJC	4th	7	1	2	3	0
2002	United States	WC	7th	7	0	1	1	4
2003	United States	WC	13th	6	1	3	4	2
2004	United States	WCH	4th	0	—	—	—	—
2005	United States	WC	6th	7	0	1	1	0
2006	United States	OG	8th	6	1	0	1	4
2008	United States	WC	6th	4	0	1	1	6
Junior totals				13	1	3	4	0
Senior totals				30	2	6	8	16

== Awards and honors ==
Award	Year
College
WCHA All-Rookie Team	1999
WCHA Third All-Star Team	1999
WCHA Second All-Star Team	2000
WCHA First All-Star Team	2001, 2002
WCHA Defensive player of the year	2001, 2002
AHCA West First-Team All-American	2001, 2002
WCHA All-Tournament Team	2002
Hobey Baker Award	2002
NHL
NHL YoungStars Game	2003

== Transactions ==
- September 26, 2000 – traded to Calgary by the Anaheim Mighty Ducks for Andrei Nazarov and Calgary's second-round choice (later traded to Phoenix later traded back to Calgary Calgary selected Andrei Taratukhin) in 2001 Entry Draft.
- June 24, 2006 – traded to Colorado Avalanche by Calgary with Calgary's second-round choice (Codey Burki) in 2006 Entry Draft and Calgary's second-round choice (Trevor Cann) in 2007 Entry Draft for Alex Tanguay.
- March 4, 2009 – traded to Calgary Flames by Colorado for Lawrence Nycholat, prospect Ryan Wilson and Montreal's second-round choice (Stefan Elliott) in the 2009 Entry Draft.
- June 27, 2009 – rights traded to Florida Panthers by Calgary with Phoenix's third-round choice (Josh Birkholz) in the 2009 NHL Entry Draft for rights to Jay Bouwmeester.
- March 1, 2010 – traded to Pittsburgh Penguins by Florida for Pittsburgh's second-round choice (Connor Brickley) in the 2010 NHL Entry Draft.
- March 30, 2013 – traded to St. Louis Blues by Buffalo for St. Louis' second-round pick and a conditional fifth-round pick in the 2013 NHL Entry Draft.
- November 15, 2014 – traded from the Blues to the Columbus Blue Jackets in exchange for a fifth-round draft pick in the 2016 NHL Entry Draft.
- March 2, 2015 - traded to Minnesota Wild by Columbus for Justin Falk and a fifth-round draft pick in the 2015 NHL Entry Draft.

Awards and achievements
Preceded by Jeff Dessner	WCHA Defensive Player of the Year; 2000–01, 2001–02	Succeeded by Joe Cullen / Aaron MacKenzie
Preceded by Ryan Miller	Winner of the Hobey Baker Award; 2001–02	Succeeded by Peter Sejna
