= Mark Cullen (ice hockey) =

American ice hockey player (born 1978)

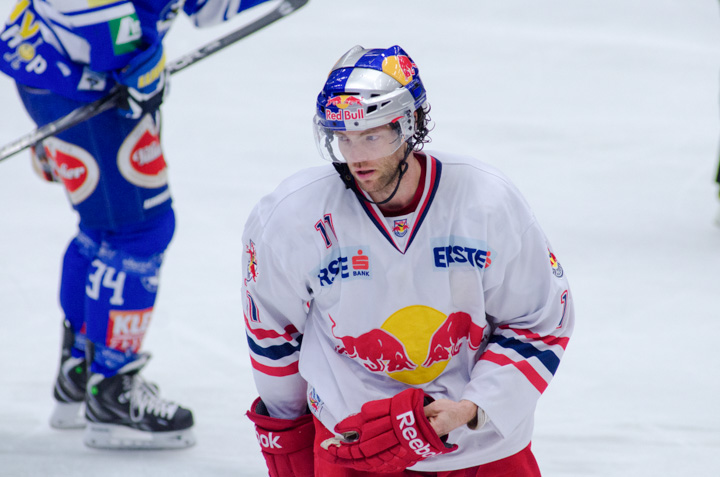
- Cullen playing for EC Red Bull Salzburg in October 2013
- Born: October 28, 1978 (age 47) Moorhead, Minnesota, U.S.
- Height: 5 ft 11 in (180 cm)
- Weight: 175 lb (79 kg; 12 st 7 lb)
- Position: Center
- Shot: Left
- Played for: Chicago Blackhawks; Philadelphia Flyers; Florida Panthers; Vityaz Podolsk; EC Red Bull Salzburg; HC Bolzano; Dresdner Eislöwen
- National team: United States
- NHL draft: Undrafted
- Playing career: 2002–2016

Mark Daniel Cullen (born October 28, 1978) is an American former professional ice hockey center. He is the younger brother of former NHL forward, and three-time Stanley Cup champion Matt Cullen.

== Playing career ==
Cullen was signed by the Minnesota Wild on April 8, 2002 after a four-year collegiate career at Colorado College. After three years of playing with the Houston Aeros of the American Hockey League (AHL), Cullen signed with the Chicago Blackhawks on August 4, 2005. Splitting time with the Norfolk Admirals of the AHL and Chicago in the 2005–06 season, Cullen saw his first NHL action by playing in 29 games.

He signed with the Philadelphia Flyers in the off-season and played in three games with the Flyers in 2006–07, spending most of his time with affiliate, the Philadelphia Phantoms. Cullen signed with the Detroit Red Wings on July 5, 2007, playing for their minor league team, the Grand Rapids Griffins of the AHL. He then signed with the Vancouver Canucks on July 4, 2008. During the 2009–10 season, Cullen returned to the Chicago Blackhawks' organization and played for the Rockford IceHogs of the AHL.

On July 22, 2010, Cullen signed a one-year contract as a free agent with the Florida Panthers. Cullen missed the start of the 2010–11 season, after rupturing an Achilles Tendon at the Panthers training camp. On November 29, 2011, the Panthers recalled Cullen and he temporarily filled in as their fourth-line center for six games.

During the 2012–13 season, Cullen joined EC Red Bull Salzburg at the midpoint of their campaign for the remainder of the year from Vityaz Podolsk of the Kontinental Hockey League on December 16, 2012.

After his second season with Salzburg, Cullen left the defeated EBEL finalists for the Champions in Italian club, HC Bolzano, signing a one-year contract on August 20, 2014.

Cullen played three seasons in the Austrian league before moving as a free agent to the Neighbouring German DEL2 league, signing a one-year deal with Dresdner Eislöwen on September 23, 2015.

== Career statistics ==
=== Regular season and playoffs ===
			Regular season					Playoffs
Season	Team	League	GP	G	A	Pts	PIM	GP	G	A	Pts	PIM
1997–98	Fargo-Moorhead Ice Sharks	USHL	30	17	37	54	16	4	3	0	3	25
1998–99	Colorado College	WCHA	42	8	25	22	—	—	—	—	—
1999–00	Colorado College	WCHA	37	11	20	31	22	—	—	—	—	—
2000–01	Colorado College	WCHA	31	20	33	53	26	—	—	—	—	—
2001–02	Colorado College	WCHA	43	14	36	50	14	—	—	—	—	—
2002–03	Houston Aeros	AHL	72	22	25	47	20	15	3	7	10	4
2003–04	Houston Aeros	AHL	53	10	28	38	28	2	0	0	0
2004–05	Houston Aeros	AHL	64	10	24	34	26	5	1	1	2	0
2005–06	Norfolk Admirals	AHL	54	29	39	68	48	4	2	2	4	0
2005–06	Chicago Blackhawks	NHL	29	7	9	16	2	—	—	—	—	—
2006–07	Philadelphia Phantoms	AHL	56	16	36	52	34	—	—	—	—	—
2006–07	Philadelphia Flyers	NHL	3	0	0	0	0	—	—	—	—	—
2007–08	Grand Rapids Griffins	AHL	59	16	31	47	61	—	—	—	—	—
2008–09	Manitoba Moose	AHL	56	14	25	39	22	20	4	9	13	0
2009–10	Rockford IceHogs	AHL	62	21	32	53	16	4	0	2	2	2
2010–11	Rochester Americans	AHL	28	5	9	14	6	—	—	—	—	—
2011–12	San Antonio Rampage	AHL	58	10	36	46	30	10	4	6	10	2
2011–12	Florida Panthers	NHL	6	0	1	1	2	—	—	—	—	—
2012–13	Vityaz Podolsk	KHL	23	0	1	1	8	—	—	—	—	—
2012–13	EC Red Bull Salzburg	EBEL	19	7	10	17	4	12	1	6	7	4
2013–14	EC Red Bull Salzburg	EBEL	54	12	24	36	32	14	4	3	7	2
2014–15	HC Bolzano	EBEL	52	11	30	41	26	7	0	2	2	4
2015–16	Dresdner Eislöwen	DEL2	41	13	33	46	38	15	0	14	14	12
NHL totals			38	7	10	17	4	—	—	—	—	—

=== International ===
Year	Team	Event	Result	GP	G	A	Pts	PIM
2006	United States	WC	7th	7	1	2	3	0
Senior totals				7	1	2	3	0

== Awards and honors ==
Award	Year
NCAA
All-WCHA First Team	2000–01
AHCA West Second-Team All-American	2000–01
WCHA All-Tournament Team	2001, 2002
All-WCHA First Team	2001–02
AHCA West Second-Team All-American	2001–02
American Hockey League
Fred T. Hunt Memorial Award	2005–06

Awards and achievements
Preceded by Karl Goehring	WCHA Student-Athlete of the Year; 2001–02	Succeeded by Tom Preissing
