= Lawrence Nycholat =

Canadian ice hockey player

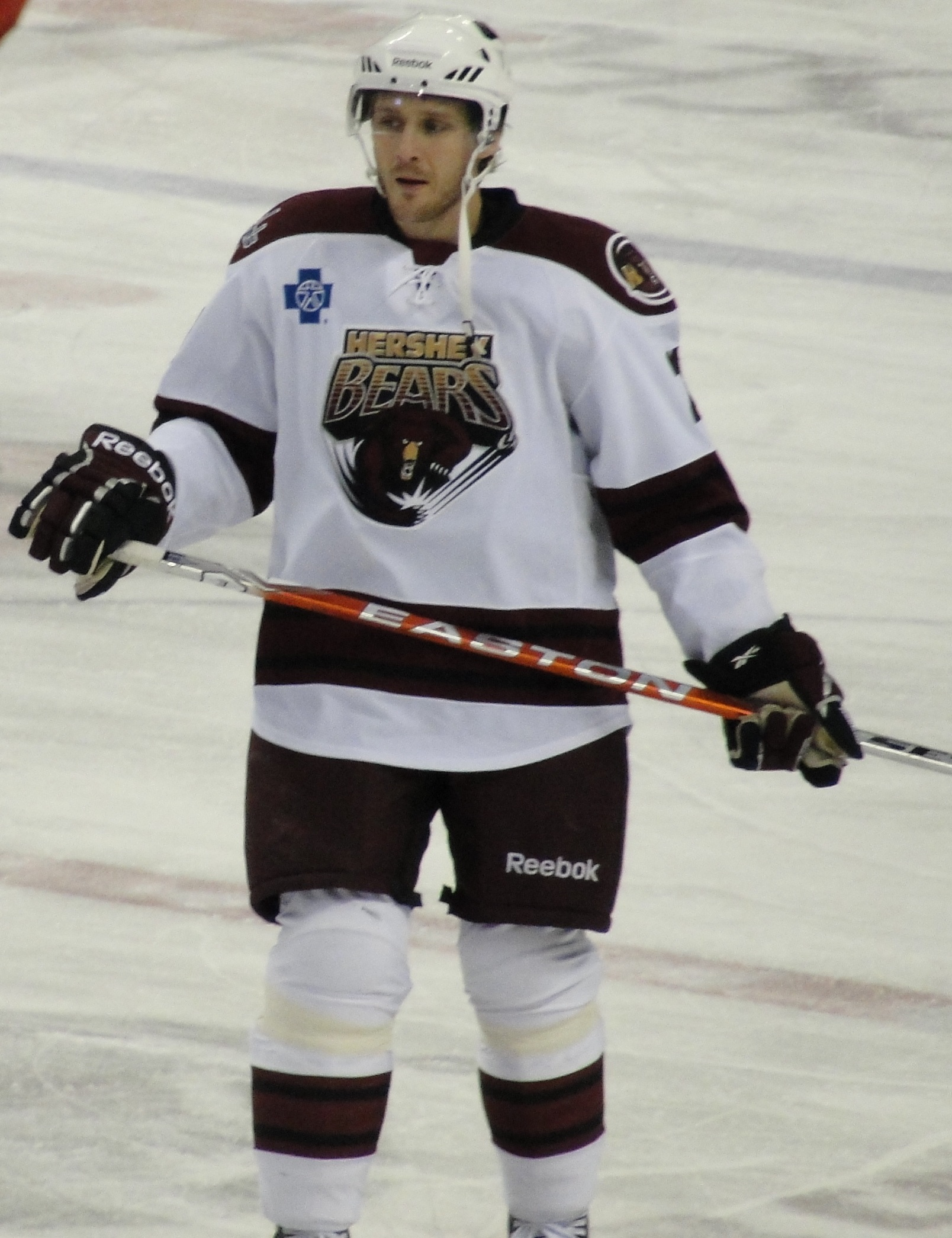
- Nycholat with the Hershey Bears in 2010
- Born: May 7, 1979 (age 47) Calgary, Alberta, Canada
- Height: 5 ft 10 in (178 cm)
- Weight: 192 lb (87 kg; 13 st 10 lb)
- Position: Defence
- Shot: Left
- Played for: New York Rangers; Washington Capitals; Ottawa Senators; Vancouver Canucks; Colorado Avalanche; Krefeld Pinguine
- NHL draft: Undrafted
- Playing career: 2000–2012

Lawrence D. Nycholat (born May 7, 1979) is a Canadian former professional ice hockey player who played in the National Hockey League with the New York Rangers, Washington Capitals, Ottawa Senators, Vancouver Canucks and the Colorado Avalanche.

== Playing career ==
As a youth, Nycholat played in the 1992 and 1993 Quebec International Pee-Wee Hockey Tournaments with the Calgary Junior Flames minor ice hockey team from Crowchild, Alberta.

After playing midget hockey with Notre Dame of the SMHL, he joined the Swift Current Broncos of the Western Hockey League for a four-year tenure, beginning in 1996–97. In his final year with the Broncos, 1999–2000, he recorded a junior career-high 80 points in 70 games.

Undrafted, Nycholat signed with the Minnesota Wild in August 2000. He played the following three seasons in Minnesota's farm system with the Jackson Bandits of the East Coast Hockey League (ECHL), the Cleveland Lumberjacks of the International Hockey League (IHL) and the Houston Aeros of the American Hockey League (AHL).

After scoring 11 goals and 39 points through 66 games with Houston in 2002–03, he was traded in March 2003 to the New York Rangers. Joining the Rangers' AHL affiliate, the Hartford Wolfpack, he completed the season with 11 points in 15 games. The following year, in 2003–04, Nycholat made his NHL debut with the Rangers, appearing in 9 games. He remained with the Rangers organization in Hartford until the end of the 2004–05 season.

In August 2005, he signed with the Washington Capitals as a free agent. He played the entirety of the 2005–06 season in the AHL with the Capitals' affiliate, the Hershey Bears, scoring an AHL career-high 57 points in 73 games. He added 14 points in 16 playoff games as the Bears captured the 2006 Calder Cup. In 2006–07, Nycholat appeared in 18 games for the Capitals and recorded his first NHL goal against Martin Brodeur of the New Jersey Devils on December 29, 2006. Serving as team captain with the Bears in the AHL, he was named as a starter for Team Canada at the 2007 AHL All-Star Classic.

On February 26, 2007, just before the 2006–07 NHL trade deadline, Nycholat was traded from Washington to the Ottawa Senators. In the off-season, Nycholat was re-signed to a multi-year contract by the Senators. He played two seasons with the Senators' organization, primarily in Binghamton. He recorded 49 points in 77 games with the Binghamton Senators, Ottawa's AHL affiliate, in 2007–08.

Just prior to the 2008–09 season, he was traded once more, this time to the Vancouver Canucks. Nycholat was used primarily as a depth defenceman for the Canucks in 2008–09, playing in only 14 games before being placed on waivers. Picked up by his hometown team, the Calgary Flames on March 3, 2009, he was traded the next day to the Colorado Avalanche. Nycholat played in 5 games with the Avalanche before his season ended after suffering a concussion in a 3-1 loss to the San Jose Sharks on March 22, 2009.

On July 2, 2009, Nycholat returned to the Vancouver Canucks, signing a one-year contract. He again linked up with the Canucks AHL affiliate, the Manitoba Moose, to provide a veteran presence. He scored 22 points in 37 games in an injury affected season before he was recalled to the Canucks to cover as an extra defenseman during the 2010 playoffs.

On July 8, 2010 Nycholat signed a one-year American Hockey League contract to return to the team he previously captained in 2006–07, the Hershey Bears. In his final professional season, Nycholat signed for the first time in Europe with Krefeld Pinguine of the German DEL. He contributed 6 points in just 23 games to end his professional hockey career with the intention to join his family owned logistics company.

== Personal life ==
Lawrences brother, Dan Nycholat, played as a defenseman in collegiate hockey at Dartmouth College. He played with the Braehead Clan of the EIHL Lawrence also has three sisters. Lawrence is a coach for his children's hockey teams.

== Awards ==
- WHL East First Team All-Star - 2000
- AHL All-Star Classic - 2005, 2006, 2007 (starter)
- Calder Cup championship (Hershey Bears) - 2006

== Career statistics ==
			Regular season					Playoffs
Season	Team	League	GP	G	A	Pts	PIM	GP	G	A	Pts	PIM
1995–96	Notre Dame Midget Hounds	SMHL	42	10	36	46	66	—	—	—	—	—
1996–97	Swift Current Broncos	WHL	67	8	13	21	82	—	—	—	—	—
1997–98	Swift Current Broncos	WHL	71	13	35	48	108	1	0	0	0	0
1998–99	Swift Current Broncos	WHL	72	16	44	60	125	6	2	2	4	12
1999–00	Swift Current Broncos	WHL	70	22	58	80	92	2	0	0	0	0
2000–01	Jackson Bandits	ECHL	5	1	2	3	5	—	—	—	—	—
2000–01	Cleveland Lumberjacks	IHL	42	3	7	10	69	4	0	0	0	2
2001–02	Houston Aeros	AHL	72	3	11	14	92	14	1	0	1	23
2002–03	Houston Aeros	AHL	66	11	28	39	155	—	—	—	—	—
2002–03	Hartford Wolf Pack	AHL	15	2	9	11	6	2	2	0	2	0
2003–04	Hartford Wolf Pack	AHL	72	6	26	32	130	—	—	—	—	—
2003–04	New York Rangers	NHL	9	0	0	0	6	—	—	—	—	—
2004–05	Hartford Wolf Pack	AHL	79	5	38	43	132	6	0	3	3	11
2005–06	Hershey Bears	AHL	73	13	44	57	94	16	2	12	14	12
2006–07	Hershey Bears	AHL	29	3	25	28	39	—	—	—	—	—
2006–07	Washington Capitals	NHL	18	2	6	8	18	—	—	—	—	—
2006–07	Ottawa Senators	NHL	1	0	0	0	0	—	—	—	—	—
2007–08	Binghamton Senators	AHL	77	12	37	49	74	—	—	—	—	—
2007–08	Ottawa Senators	NHL	3	0	0	0	0	—	—	—	—	—
2008–09	Vancouver Canucks	NHL	14	0	1	1	6	—	—	—	—	—
2008–09	Manitoba Moose	AHL	3	0	3	3	4	—	—	—	—	—
2008–09	Colorado Avalanche	NHL	5	0	0	0	0	—	—	—	—	—
2009–10	Manitoba Moose	AHL	37	5	17	22	49	4	0	1	1	4
2010–11	Hershey Bears	AHL	32	5	23	28	21	—	—	—	—	—
2011–12	Krefeld Pinguine	DEL	23	1	5	6	42	—	—	—	—	—
NHL totals			50	2	7	9	24	—	—	—	—	—

== Transactions ==
- August 31, 2000 - Signed as a free agent by the Minnesota Wild.
- March 11, 2003 - Traded from Minnesota to the New York Rangers in exchange for Johan Holmqvist.
- August 9, 2005 - Signed as a free agent by the Washington Capitals.
- February 26, 2007 - Traded from Washington to the Ottawa Senators in exchange for Andy Hedlund and a sixth-round draft pick in 2007.
- July 13, 2007 - Re-signed to a multi-year contract by the Ottawa Senators.
- September 2, 2008 - Traded from Ottawa to the Vancouver Canucks in exchange for Ryan Shannon.
- March 3, 2009 - Claimed off waivers by the Calgary Flames.
- March 4, 2009 - Traded from the Calgary Flames to the Colorado Avalanche with Ryan Wilson and a second-round draft pick in exchange for Jordan Leopold.
- July 2, 2009 - Signed as a Free Agent by the Vancouver Canucks.
- July 8, 2010 - Signed as a Free Agent by the Hershey Bears.
- July 18, 2011 - Signed as a Free Agent by Krefeld Pinguine.
