= Ryan Wilson (ice hockey) =

Canadian ice hockey player (born 1987)

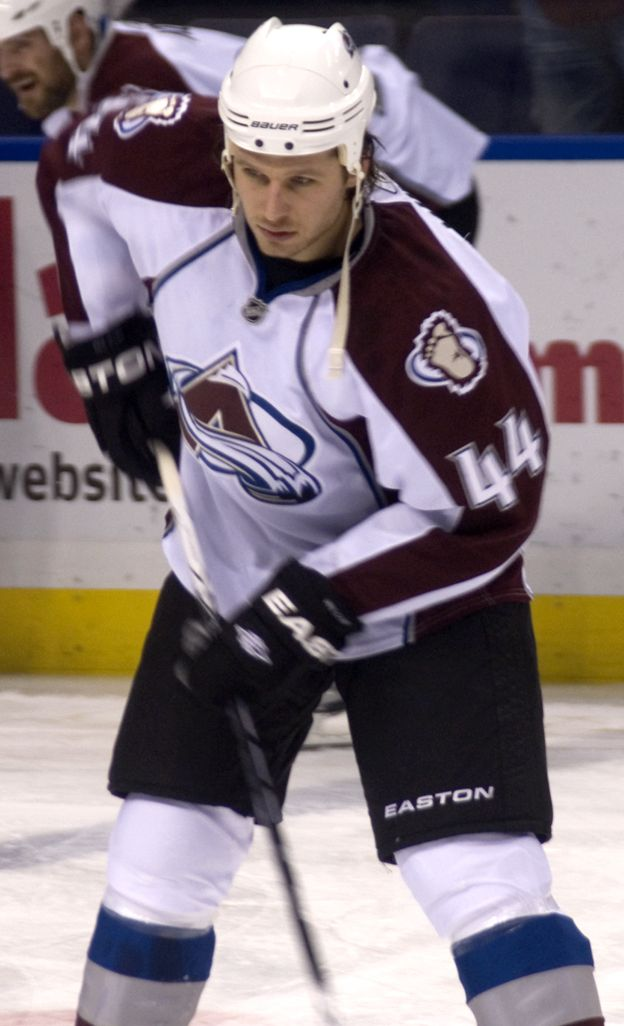
- Wilson with the Colorado Avalanche in 2011
- Born: February 3, 1987 (age 39) Windsor, Ontario, Canada
- Height: 6 ft 1 in (185 cm)
- Weight: 207 lb (94 kg; 14 st 11 lb)
- Position: Defence
- Shot: Left
- Played for: Colorado Avalanche; Ak Bars Kazan; HC Lugano; KalPa
- NHL draft: Undrafted
- Playing career: 2008–2020

Ryan Wilson (born February 3, 1987) is a Canadian former professional ice hockey defenceman who played in the National Hockey League (NHL) with the Colorado Avalanche.

== Playing career ==
=== Junior ===
Wilson first played Major junior hockey with the Toronto St. Michael's Majors of the Ontario Hockey League. Ryan led the defense in scoring in the last two of his three seasons with the Majors, before joining the Sarnia Sting for the 2006–07 season. Undrafted but establishing as a hard-hitting offensive defenseman, Wilson was invited as a free agent to the 2006 St. Louis Blues training camp before returning to the OHL. As captain of Sarnia, Ryan led the Sting's defense to be named to be named OHL defenseman of the Month for October. After participating in the 2007 OHL All-Star game for the Western Conference, Wilson finished the season with career high 17 goals and 75 points to lead the OHL in scoring among defenseman and place third in the Western Conference coaches poll with the Hardest shot, Best bodychecker and offensive defenseman categories.

Overlooked in the NHL entry draft, Wilson was invited to the 2007 Philadelphia Flyers training camp on September 16, before returning for his final junior season as captain with the Sting in 2007–08. Alongside future first overall NHL draft pick, Steven Stamkos, Wilson led the Sting to the second round of the Western Conference finals finishing with a career high 64 assists and 71 points in 58 games as the leading scoring defenseman in the OHL for the second consecutive season. He was named as the Western conferences Best bodychecker, and earned selection to the OHL's Third All-Star Team.

=== Professional ===
Completing his junior career, Ryan signed as a free agent to a three-year entry-level contract with the Calgary Flames on July 1, 2008. In the 2008–09 season, Wilson made his professional debut with the Flames affiliate, the Quad City Flames of the AHL. On March 4, 2009, he was traded by the Flames along with Lawrence Nycholat and a second round pick to the Colorado Avalanche for Jordan Leopold. He was then assigned to affiliate, the Lake Erie Monsters of the AHL, where he finished out the season.

Wilson started the 2009–10 season with the Monsters, before receiving his first recall to the injury stricken Avalanche on October 12, 2009. Ryan made his NHL debut with the Avalanche in a 3-2 victory against the Montreal Canadiens on October 14, 2009. He recorded his first point, an assist, against the Carolina Hurricanes on October 23, 2009. On November 17, 2009, Wilson scored his first career NHL goal in a 3-2 victory, fittingly against Miikka Kiprusoff of the Calgary Flames. Wilson remained with the Avalanche and quickly established himself as an aggressive open ice hitter, most notably gaining league-wide attention after delivering a big hit to New Jersey Devils star Patrik Eliáš. In the following game against the Edmonton Oilers on January 18, 2010, Wilson was on the receiving end of a targeted hit and was sidelined by a concussion. Ryan's rookie season slowed after sustaining a second concussion in the months following, however he finished the season to lead Colorado's defense in Plus/minus (+13) and place third in scoring with 21 points. On June 25, 2012 it was reported that Ryan re-signed with the Avalanche for $6.7 million over 3 years.

Over the course of his contract extension with the Avalanche, Wilson's career was blighted by injury. He featured in just 12 and 28 games over the first two seasons before appearing in 3 games in his final year under contract in the 2014–15 season when the team announced that Wilson would be sidelined due to a season-ending shoulder surgery on November 18, 2014.

As a free agent, Wilson was unable to garner a solid contract offer. On September 3, 2015, it was announced that Wilson would join the Calgary Flames organization for their training camp for the 2015–16 season on a professional try-out contract. Wilson played in the pre-season with the Flames before he was released without a contract offer on October 5. Over a month later, Wilson headed overseas to sign for the remainder of the season with Russian club, Ak Bars Kazan of the Kontinental Hockey League, on November 6, 2015. Wilson made a tentative return with Ak Bars, appearing in 24 games for 3 assists in the regular season from the blueline. He registered two post-season goals in the playoffs before leaving as a free agent to end the year.

Unsigned over the summer, Wilson belatedly signed a one-year deal with Swiss club, HC Lugano of the NLA on September 13, 2016.

== Career statistics ==
| | | | Regular season | | | | | Playoffs |
| Season | Team | League | GP | G | A | Pts | PIM | GP | G | A | Pts | PIM |
|---|---|---|---|---|---|---|---|---|---|---|---|---|
| 2003–04 | Toronto St. Michael's Majors | OHL | 58 | 3 | 22 | 25 | 88 | 18 | 3 | 7 | 10 | 16 |
| 2004–05 | Toronto St. Michael's Majors | OHL | 68 | 13 | 24 | 37 | 149 | 10 | 4 | 5 | 9 | 12 |
| 2005–06 | Toronto St. Michael's Majors | OHL | 64 | 12 | 49 | 61 | 145 | 4 | 1 | 3 | 4 | 12 |
| 2006–07 | Sarnia Sting | OHL | 68 | 17 | 58 | 75 | 136 | 4 | 1 | 3 | 4 | 14 |
| 2007–08 | Sarnia Sting | OHL | 58 | 7 | 64 | 71 | 84 | 9 | 0 | 7 | 7 | 19 |
| 2008–09 | Quad City Flames | AHL | 60 | 4 | 16 | 20 | 56 | — | — | — | — | — |
| 2008–09 | Lake Erie Monsters | AHL | 8 | 0 | 2 | 2 | 25 | — | — | — | — | — |
| 2009–10 | Lake Erie Monsters | AHL | 3 | 0 | 0 | 0 | 17 | — | — | — | — | — |
| 2009–10 | Colorado Avalanche | NHL | 61 | 3 | 18 | 21 | 36 | 4 | 0 | 1 | 1 | 0 |
| 2010–11 | Colorado Avalanche | NHL | 67 | 3 | 13 | 16 | 68 | — | — | — | — | — |
| 2011–12 | Colorado Avalanche | NHL | 59 | 1 | 20 | 21 | 33 | — | — | — | — | — |
| 2012–13 | Colorado Avalanche | NHL | 12 | 0 | 3 | 3 | 8 | — | — | — | — | — |
| 2013–14 | Colorado Avalanche | NHL | 28 | 0 | 6 | 6 | 12 | 4 | 0 | 2 | 2 | 2 |
| 2013–14 | Lake Erie Monsters | AHL | 1 | 0 | 0 | 0 | 0 | — | — | — | — | — |
| 2014–15 | Colorado Avalanche | NHL | 3 | 0 | 0 | 0 | 0 | — | — | — | — | — |
| 2015–16 | Ak Bars Kazan | KHL | 24 | 0 | 3 | 3 | 25 | 7 | 2 | 0 | 2 | 36 |
| 2016–17 | HC Lugano | NLA | 32 | 2 | 10 | 12 | 34 | 7 | 0 | 3 | 3 | 2 |
| 2017–18 | KalPa | Liiga | 39 | 1 | 11 | 12 | 39 | 6 | 0 | 0 | 0 | 12 |
| 2018–19 | KalPa | Liiga | 54 | 1 | 13 | 14 | 53 | — | — | — | — | — |
| 2019–20 | KalPa | Liiga | 35 | 0 | 6 | 6 | 10 | — | — | — | — | — |
| NHL totals | | | 230 | 7 | 60 | 67 | 157 | 8 | 0 | 3 | 3 | 2 |

== Awards and honours ==
| Award | Year |
|---|---|
OHL
| Third All-Star Team | 2007–08 |
