= Justin Morrison =

American professional ice hockey player (born 1979)

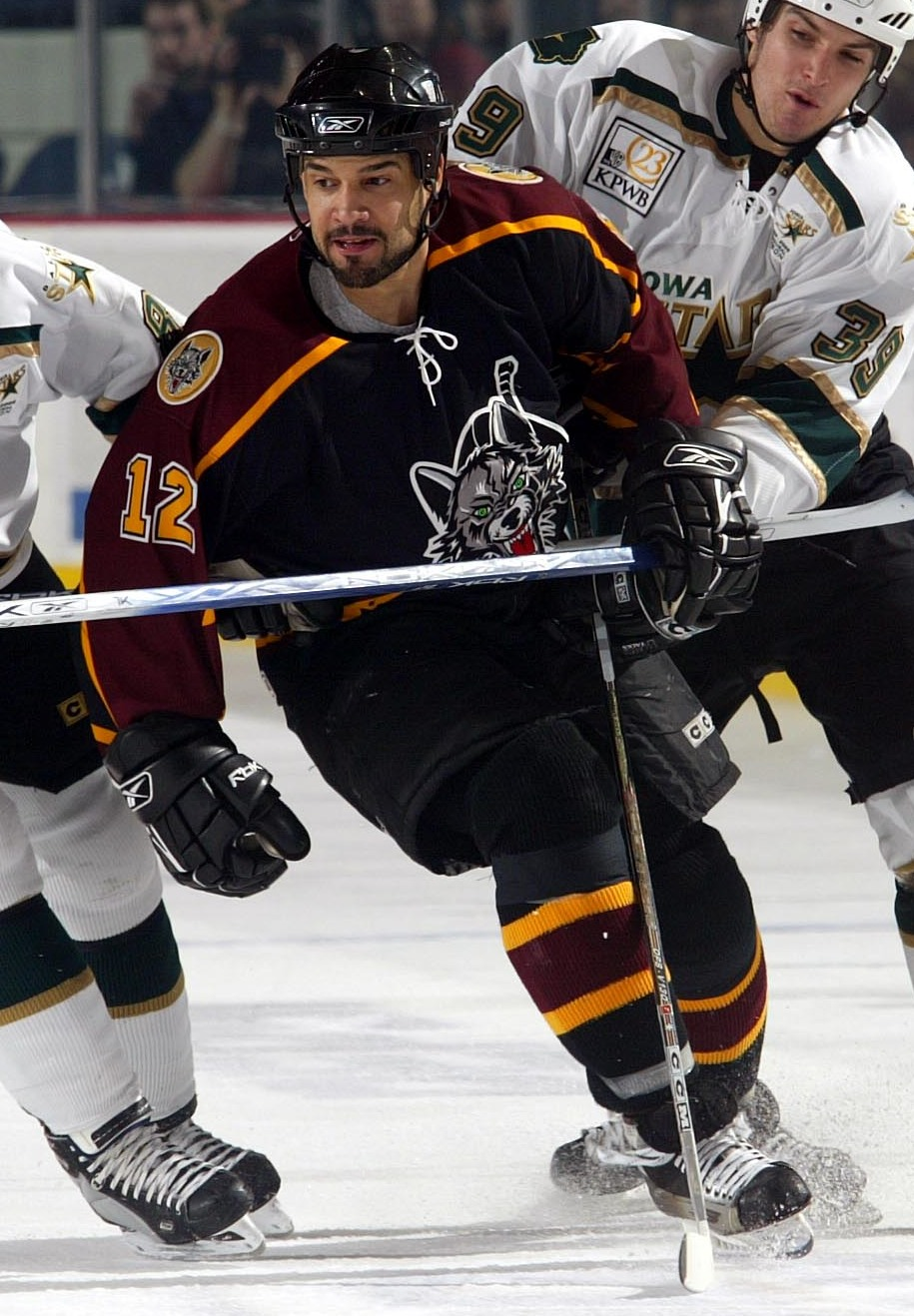
- Morrison with the Chicago Wolves in 2006
- Born: August 10, 1979 (age 46) Los Angeles, California, U.S.
- Height: 6 ft 3 in (191 cm)
- Weight: 220 lb (100 kg; 15 st 10 lb)
- Position: Right wing
- Shot: Right
- Played for: Lukko (SM-liiga); Frölunda HC (SEL); Modo (SEL); Rapperswil-Jona Lakers; HC Dinamo Minsk; HC Davos; Hamburg Freezers (DEL)
- NHL draft: 81st overall, 1998; Vancouver Canucks
- Playing career: 2001–2011

Justin Morrison (born August 10, 1979, in Los Angeles, California, United States) is an American former professional ice hockey player who last played for Lukko of the SM-liiga.

== Playing career ==
Justin Morrison starting playing hockey late in his childhood — around age 11 — after seeing the sport at a local rink. His talent was quickly recognized as he moved from local Los Angeles teams to playing for the Omaha Lancers in the United States Hockey League. Soon thereafter, he became a member of the USA U-17 team that participated in the World U-17 Hockey Challenge. Morrison has since played for the United States World Junior Team in the 1999 World Junior Ice Hockey Championships, and has been a recurring member of the USA Hockey Inline Team. As a teenager, Morrison appeared in the movie D2: The Mighty Ducks as a street hockey player.

Morrison's collegiate career consisted of four years at Colorado College playing in the WCHA. He is a current member of the university's Century Club, having tallied more than 100 collegiate points. Morrison was drafted by the Vancouver Canucks in the 1998 NHL entry draft in the 3rd round, as the 81st pick overall. At the time, he was the second-highest NHL draft pick in the school's illustrious hockey history. He was also the first African-American hockey player from Los Angeles to be drafted into the NHL.

As a professional, Morrison spent four seasons with the Vancouver Canucks of the NHL and their affiliate the Manitoba Moose of the AHL. Morrison also spent a season with Atlanta Thrashers, playing for the Chicago Wolves in the AHL.

Morrison's first season overseas was in the Swedish Elitserien playing for Modo Hockey. Morrison tallied 28 points in 34 games (18 goals, 10 assists) and helped lead his team to an SEL Championship. Morrison has also played for Frölunda HC in Elitserien, for the Hamburg Freezers in the DEL, and for a short time with both the HC Dinamo Minsk in the KHL and Switzerland's HC Davos.

For the 2009–10 season Morrison returned the Finnish SM-liiga, where he was the top scorer for Lukko and among the top scorers in the league, having tallied 51 points in 50 games during the regular season, and was nominated as league MVP.

In 2009, while playing for Lukko, Morrison again joined USA Hockey, this time for the Deutschland Cup, hosted by the city of Munich. Morrison took home Player of the Game honors against Germany for his 2-goal effort, and was the USA's top scorer for the tournament. Team USA took home 2nd place to Germany after losing in a shoot-out to the Czech Republic.

For the 2010-11 season, Morrison returned to Lukko where he had another productive season, positioning himself as one of the league's most prolific players.

== Privates ==
Justin Morrison lives in Portland, Oregon with his two sons.

== Career statistics ==
			Regular season					Playoffs
Season	Team	League	GP	G	A	Pts	PIM	GP	G	A	Pts	PIM
1996–97	Omaha Lancers	USHL	51	9	20	29	44	10	2	4	6	8
1997–98	Colorado College	NCAA	42	4	9	13	8	—	—	—	—	—
1998–99	Colorado College	NCAA	38	23	15	38	33	—	—	—	—	—
1999–00	Colorado College	NCAA	38	7	19	26	28	—	—	—	—	—
2000–01	Colorado College	NCAA	41	21	14	35	42	—	—	—	—	—
2001–02	Manitoba Moose	AHL	64	10	9	19	37	7	1	0	1	0
2002–03	Manitoba Moose	AHL	30	10	6	16	13	2	0	0	0	4
2002–03	Columbia Inferno	ECHL	40	20	35	55	39	—	—	—	—	—
2003–04	Manitoba Moose	AHL	66	18	18	36	27	—	—	—	—	—
2004–05	Manitoba Moose	AHL	71	11	10	21	33	14	1	5	6	8
2005–06	Chicago Wolves	AHL	58	22	17	39	38	—	—	—	—	—
2006–07	Modo Hockey	SHL	34	18	10	28	38	9	0	0	0	24
2007–08	TPS	Liiga	2	0	1	1	0	—	—	—	—	—
2007–08	Frölunda HC	SHL	11	1	3	4	6	—	—	—	—	—
2007–08	Rapperswil-Jona Lakers	NLA	1	0	1	1	0	—	—	—	—	—
2007–08	Lukko	Liiga	16	4	8	12	22	6	4	2	6	0
2008–09	HC Dinamo Minsk	KHL	3	0	0	0	2	—	—	—	—	—
2008–09	HC Davos	NLA	2	0	1	1	2	—	—	—	—	—
2008–09	Hamburg Freezers	DEL	24	4	5	9	14	1	0	0	0	0
2009–10	Lukko	Liiga	50	18	33	51	60	4	0	1	1	8
2010–11	Lukko	Liiga	56	22	19	41	34	4	0	0	0	2
AHL totals			289	71	60	131	148	35	4	8	12	16

== Awards and honors ==
Award	Year
WCHA All-Tournament Team	1999
