= Reggie Berg =

American ice hockey player (born 1976)

- Born: September 18, 1976 (age 49) Coon Rapids, Minnesota, U.S.
- Height: 5 ft 10 in (178 cm)
- Weight: 190 lb (86 kg; 13 st 8 lb)
- Position: Center
- Shot: Left
- ECHL team Former teams: Florida Everblades; AHL; Lowell Lock Monsters; IHL; Orlando Solar Bears; Cincinnati Cyclones
- NHL draft: 178th overall, 1996; Toronto Maple Leafs
- Playing career: 1999–2007

Reggie Berg (born September 18, 1976) is an American former professional ice hockey player who played for the Florida Everblades of the ECHL. He was selected by the Toronto Maple Leafs in the 7th round (178th overall) of the 1996 NHL entry draft.

== Career ==
Berg played juniors for two seasons with the Des Moines Buccaneers before spending four seasons at the University of Minnesota with their hockey team. He turned professional in the 1999-2000 season, spending most of the season with the Florida Everblades, playing two games for the Orlando Solar Bears in the IHL. The next two seasons, Berg split time between the Everblades, the IHL's Cincinnati Cyclones—a total of 3 games in the 2000-01 season—and the AHL's Lowell Lock Monsters. Berg did not play in 2002-03, and from the 2003-04 season through his retirement at the end of 2006-07, he played exclusively for the Everblades.

=== Statistics ===
Regular season								Postseason				
Season	Team	League	GP	G	A	TP	PIM	GP	G	A	TP	PIM
1999-00	Orlando Solar Bears	IHL	2	0	0	0	0					
1999-00	Florida Everblades	ECHL	52	27	26	53	64	5	2	1	3	6
2000-01	Cincinnati Cyclones	IHL	3	0	0	0	2					
2000-01	Lowell Lock Monsters	AHL	30	6	7	13	22					
2000-01	Florida Everblades	ECHL	33	19	29	48	39	5	1	3	4	6
2001-02	Lowell Lock Monsters	AHL	29	4	8	12	15	5	1	0	1	4
2001-02	Florida Everblades	ECHL	29	14	11	25	41					
2003-04	Florida Everblades	ECHL	40	24	23	47	59	16	5	14	19	33
2004-05	Florida Everblades	ECHL	40	21	34	55	46	19	7	6	13	16
2005-06	Florida Everblades	ECHL	28	11	16	27	37	6	3	3	6	12
2006-07	Florida Everblades	ECHL	58	29	35	64	48	2	1	0	1	0
ECHL totals:			280	145	174	319	354	53	19	27	46	73
AHL totals:			59	10	15	25	37	5	1	0	1	4
IHL totals:			5	0	0	0	2					

== Awards and honors ==
Award	Year
All-WCHA Second Team	1997–98

Berg has his jersey, number 10, is retired by the Florida Everblades, with a banner hanging in the rafters of Hertz Arena.
