= Tyler Arnason =

American ice hockey player (born 1979)

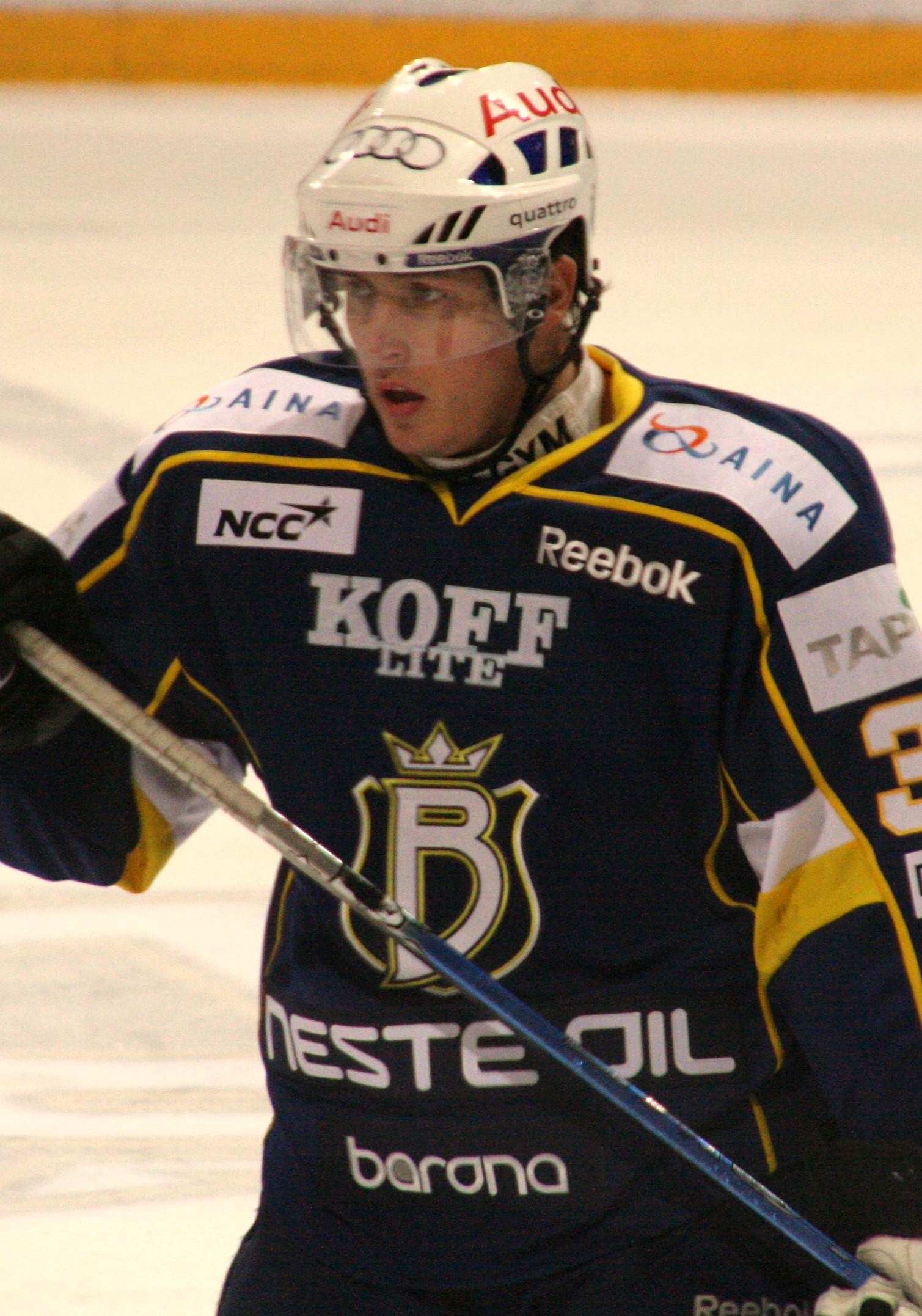
- Arnason with Espoo Blues in 2011
- Born: March 16, 1979 (age 47) Oklahoma City, Oklahoma, U.S.
- Height: 5 ft 11 in (180 cm)
- Weight: 204 lb (93 kg; 14 st 8 lb)
- Position: Center
- Shot: Left
- Played for: Chicago Blackhawks; Brynäs IF; Ottawa Senators; Colorado Avalanche; Dinamo Riga; EHC Biel; Espoo Blues
- National team: United States
- NHL draft: 183rd overall, 1998; Chicago Blackhawks
- Playing career: 2001–2012

Tyler Lawrence Arnason (born March 16, 1979) is an American former professional ice hockey center who played in the National Hockey League (NHL) for the Chicago Blackhawks, Ottawa Senators and the Colorado Avalanche.

== Early life ==
He is the son of former NHL winger Chuck Arnason. Arnason was born in Oklahoma City, when his father was a member of the Oklahoma City Stars of the Central Hockey League (CHL).

Arnason and his family moved to Winnipeg, Manitoba following the end of his father's career. He attended St. John's-Ravenscourt School, graduating in 1997.

Arnason is the brother of Canadian actress and screenwriter Aubrey Arnason.

== Playing career ==
Arnason attended St. Cloud State University and played 118 games for the men's hockey team, registering 136 points in his three years with the team. In 2001, he led St. Cloud to the Western Collegiate Hockey Association title.

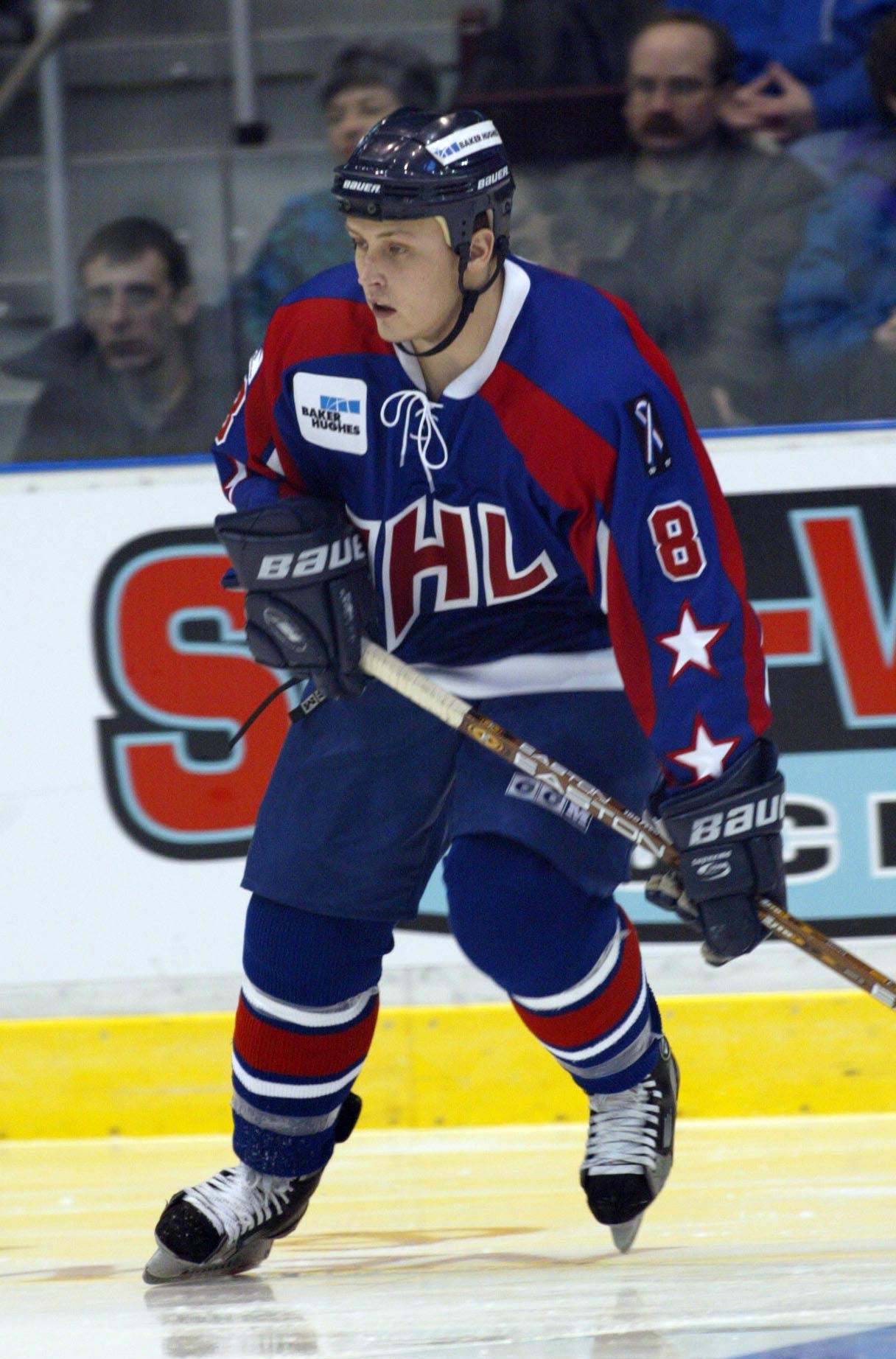
Tyler Arnason at AHL All-Star Classic 2002

Arnason was drafted by the Chicago Blackhawks of the National Hockey League (NHL) in the 1998 NHL entry draft in the seventh round, 183rd overall. In his first professional season, Arnason started out with the Blackhawks but due to poor conditioning spent most of the year with the team's American Hockey League (AHL) affiliate, the Norfolk Admirals. He was impressive in the AHL however, selected in the AHL All-Star Classic for PlanetUSA. Arnason was also awarded the Dudley "Red" Garrett Memorial Award as the league's top rookie, and was named to the league's All-Rookie team.

In the 2002–03 season, his first full season in the NHL, Arnason was named NHL Rookie of the Month in October played in the NHL Youngstars Game and was named in the All-Rookie team. During the season, Arnason recorded his first career NHL hat trick, scoring all three Chicago goals in a 3–3 tie versus the San Jose Sharks on December 28. His best season was in 2003–04 when he amassed 55 points. While playing with Chicago he was part of the "ABC" line with two other young forwards, Mark Bell and Kyle Calder. In the very early morning of January 21, 2003, Arnason was involved in an off-ice incident. Arnason, Phil Housley and Theoren Fleury were leaving the Pure Platinum strip club in Columbus, Ohio when Fleury punched the club's manager in the face. Housley and Arnason had to step in to prevent Fleury from being beaten by the bouncers. On August 11, 2005, Arnason re-signed with the Blackhawks for one year.

By the 2005–06 NHL season, Arnason was no longer a prospect and was considered as having not played to his potential. With the Blackhawks that season, Arnason had tallied 13 goals and 41 points in 60 games when, on March 9, 2006, he was traded to the Ottawa Senators in exchange for Brandon Bochenski and a second-round pick in the 2006 NHL entry draft. Ottawa's intent was for Arnason to center the second line. In the nineteen games he played for Ottawa in the regular season, he registered four assists and failed to score a goal. He was a healthy scratch in the playoffs. As a restricted free agent the Senators chose not to give him a qualifying offer, so he became an unrestricted free agent.

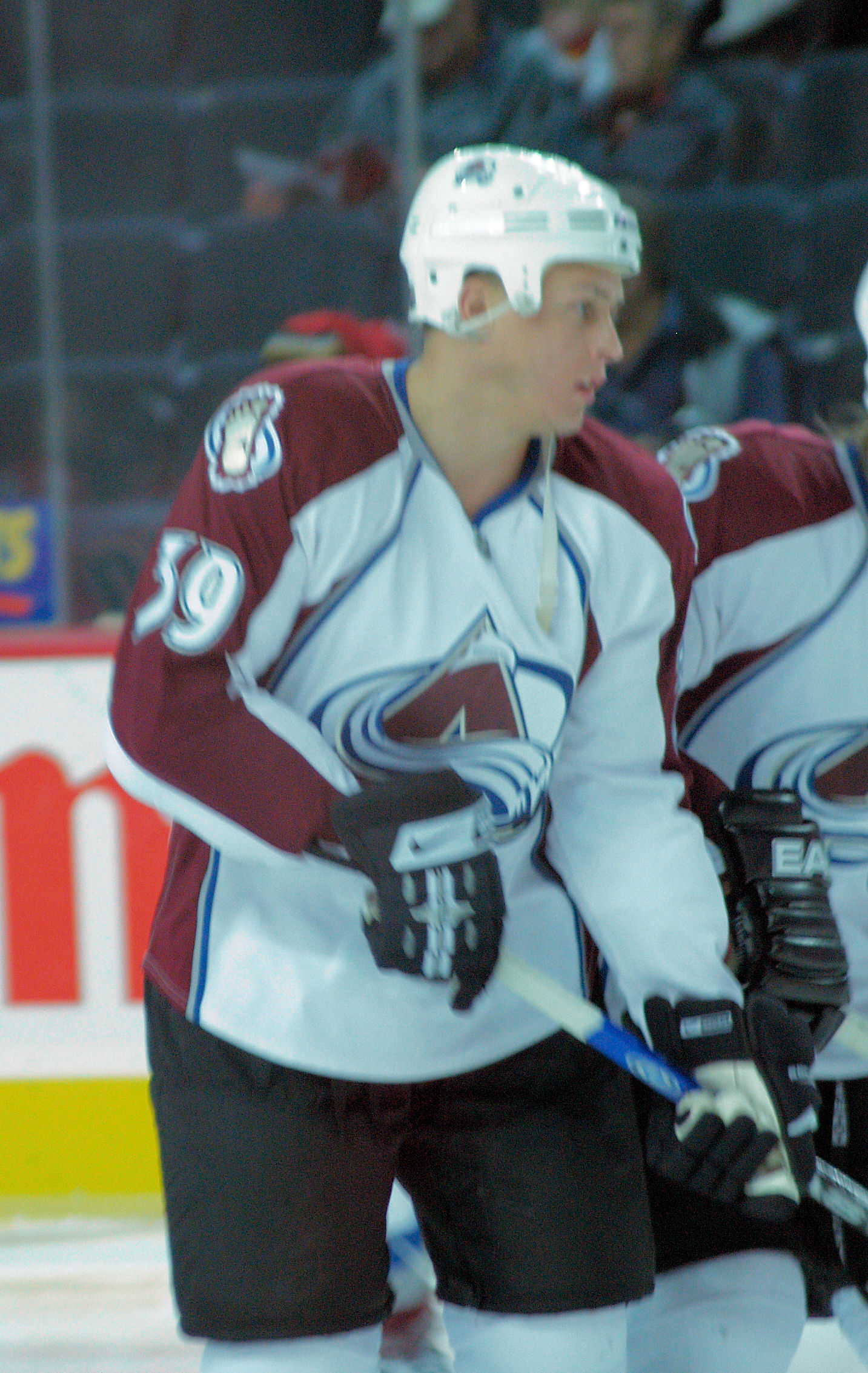
Arnason during his time in Colorado.

On July 1, 2006, Arnason signed a one-year deal with the Colorado Avalanche. As his father played for the Rockies for two seasons, Arnason's signing made him the first son of a former Rockies player to play for the Avalanche. Arnason enjoyed a return to form by posting 49 points for the Avalanche in the 2006–07 season. He was consequently awarded a two-year extension by the Avalanche on June 22, 2007. His second season with the Avalanche saw Arnason tally 10 goals and 31 points in 70 games. In his third and final season in Colorado, he registered 5 goals and 21 points in 70 games.

On July 3, 2009, Arnason signed a one-year two-way contract with the New York Rangers for the 2009–10 season. On September 17, 2009, Arnason failed to make the Rangers out of training camp and was assigned to their AHL affiliate, the Hartford Wolf Pack, for the beginning of the season. On November 10, 2009, without the ambition to play in the AHL he was suspended by the Rangers and released from his contract to sign with the European team Dinamo Riga of the Kontinental Hockey League. Following a difficult transition and recording only 11 points in 26 games, Arnason's contract was not renewed by Riga at season's end.

Returning to North America, as a free agent, he accepted a tryout invitation to attend the Florida Panthers training camp for the 2010–11 season. Subsequently, released from the Panthers during the preseason, Arnason then initially accepted another invite to his local AHL club, the Manitoba Moose, affiliate of the Vancouver Canucks, before electing to not report to camp on September 27, 2010. Arnason then accepted a temporary contract to return to Europe, signing with Swiss team EHC Biel of the National League A (NLA) on October 14, 2010. He scored 10 points in 9 games with Biel before he moved on to EHC Visp of the National League B (NLB), signing a contract for the remainder of the season on November 11, 2010. However, a week later, Arnason was released playing in just a single game with Visp, after both parties mutually opted to exercise an exit clause in the contract on November 18, 2010. On January 31, 2011, Arnason joined Finnish team, Espoo Blues, for the remainder of the season. However, his tenure with his new club was again short lived, as after 8 games, Arnason sought a release from the Blues to return to the United States on February 28, 2011.

On October 7, 2011, Arnason was named on the Texas Stars opening night roster for the 2011–12 AHL season. After seven games with the Stars, Arnason opted to be released from his try-out on October 29 and ended his professional career.

== International play ==
Arnason played for Team USA at the 2007 IIHF World Championship. He scored in Team USA's final game against Finland, which Finland won 5–4. Team USA finished fifth in the tournament.

== Career statistics ==
=== Regular season and playoffs ===
			Regular season					Playoffs
Season	Team	League	GP	G	A	Pts	PIM	GP	G	A	Pts	PIM
1995–96	Winnipeg Warriors AAA	Midget	39	19	25	44	20	—	—	—	—	—
1996–97	Winnipeg South Blues	MJHL	50	35	50	85	15	6	3	3	6	18
1997–98	Fargo-Moorhead Ice Sharks	USHL	52	37	45	82	16	4	1	1	2	2
1998–99	St. Cloud State University	WCHA	38	14	17	31	16	—	—	—	—	—
1999–2000	St. Cloud State University	WCHA	39	19	30	49	18	—	—	—	—	—
2000–01	St. Cloud State University	WCHA	41	28	28	56	14	—	—	—	—	—
2001–02	Norfolk Admirals	AHL	60	26	30	56	42	—	—	—	—	—
2001–02	Chicago Blackhawks	NHL	21	3	1	4	4	3	0	0	0	0
2002–03	Chicago Blackhawks	NHL	82	19	20	39	20	—	—	—	—	—
2003–04	Chicago Blackhawks	NHL	82	22	33	55	16	—	—	—	—	—
2004–05	Brynäs IF	SEL	4	0	0	0	0	—	—	—	—	—
2005–06	Chicago Blackhawks	NHL	60	13	28	41	40	—	—	—	—	—
2005–06	Ottawa Senators	NHL	19	0	4	4	4	—	—	—	—	—
2006–07	Colorado Avalanche	NHL	82	16	33	49	26	—	—	—	—	—
2007–08	Colorado Avalanche	NHL	70	10	21	31	16	10	2	3	5	2
2008–09	Colorado Avalanche	NHL	71	5	17	22	14	—	—	—	—	—
2009–10	Hartford Wolf Pack	AHL	11	0	3	3	2	—	—	—	—	—
2009–10	Dinamo Riga	KHL	26	4	7	11	6	3	0	1	1	0
2010–11	EHC Biel	NLA	9	5	5	10	0	—	—	—	—	—
2010–11	EHC Visp	NLB	1	1	0	1	0	—	—	—	—	—
2010–11	Blues	SM-l	8	0	4	4	0	—	—	—	—	—
2011–12	Texas Stars	AHL	7	1	0	1	0	—	—	—	—	—
NHL totals			487	88	157	245	140	13	2	3	5	2

=== International ===
Year	Team	Event	Result	GP	G	A	Pts	PIM
2007	United States	WC	5th	7	1	3	4	0
Senior totals				7	1	3	4	0

== Awards and honors ==
Award	Year
Junior
MJHL Rookie of the Year	1996–97
USHL First All-Star Team	1997–98
College
WCHA Rookie Team	1998–99
WCHA Second Team	1999–00
WCHA All-Tournament Team	2001
AHL
All-Star Game	2002
All-Rookie Team	2001–02
Dudley "Red" Garrett Memorial Award	2001–02
NHL
YoungStars Game	2002–03
All-Rookie Team	2002–03

== See also ==
- List of family relations in the NHL

Awards and achievements
Preceded by Lee Goren	WCHA Most Valuable Player in Tournament; 2001	Succeeded by Wade Dubielewicz
