= Wade Dubielewicz =

Canadian ice hockey player (born 1979)

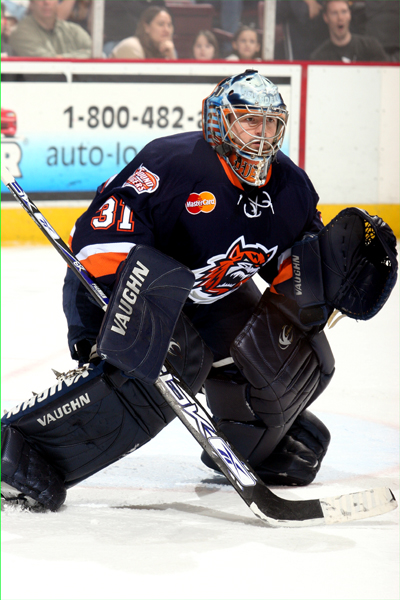
- Dubielewicz with the Bridgeport Sound Tigers during the 2006-07 season
- Born: January 30, 1979 (age 47) Invermere, British Columbia, Canada
- Height: 5 ft 10 in (178 cm)
- Weight: 178 lb (81 kg; 12 st 10 lb)
- Position: Goaltender
- Caught: Left
- Played for: New York Islanders; Ak Bars Kazan; Columbus Blue Jackets; Minnesota Wild; Kölner Haie
- NHL draft: Undrafted
- Playing career: 2003–2012

Wade Roger Dubielewicz (born January 30, 1979) is a Canadian former professional ice hockey goaltender. He played 43 games in the National Hockey League (NHL) between 2003 and 2010 with three teams: the Columbus Blue Jackets, Minnesota Wild, and New York Islanders. The rest of his career, which lasted from 2003 to 2011, was spent mainly in the American Hockey League.

Following his retirement, he became a goaltending coach for the Columbia Valley Rockies of the KIJHL, where his junior ice hockey career began.

== Playing career ==
=== Junior ===
Dubielewicz played at the University of Denver and as a junior in 2001–2002 led his team to the NCAA tournament. He turned down a million-plus-dollar NHL offer to stay at Denver for his senior season and to finish his degree. Before signing with Denver, he played for the Junior A Fernie Ghostriders of the now-dormant RMJHL in Fernie, British Columbia. He played Junior B for the Columbia Valley Rockies of the KIJHL in Invermere, British Columbia, and then moved on to Trail of the BCHL in 1998–99, before ending his junior career the next year for the Chilliwack Chiefs.

=== Professional ===
After tending goal for four years at Denver, Dubielewicz was signed as an undrafted free agent by the New York Islanders on May 26, 2003. He joined the Islanders' American Hockey League (AHL) affiliate, the Bridgeport Sound Tigers, where he became a fan favorite at the Arena at Harbor Yard, home of the Tigers. "Dubie" holds numerous AHL league records that still stand as of 2009. He holds the AHL/Sound Tigers records for most shutouts (15) and wins (81) in a career, and highest save percentage (.946) and goals against average (1.38) in a season (during the 2003–04 AHL season), passing the records of Rick DiPietro. Dubielewicz won the Dudley "Red" Garrett Memorial Award as the top rookie in the AHL for 2003–04.

Dubielewicz made his first appearance of the 2006–2007 season for the New York Islanders on March 15, 2007, relieving Mike Dunham. In the regular season, he started the Islanders' final five games with a record of 4–1–0. On April 8, 2007, in the final game of the season against the New Jersey Devils, after Dubielewicz gave up a goal to John Madden with .7 seconds left in regulation, he rebounded to stop the Devils in the shootout of a 3–2 victory to send the Islanders into the postseason as the 8th seed, eliminating the Toronto Maple Leafs from playoff contention.

Dubielewicz made his post-season debut on April 12, 2007 on the road in game one of the Eastern Conference Quarter-finals against the Buffalo Sabres. He allowed four goals on 35 shots in a 4–1 loss, giving the Sabres a 1–0 series lead. His teammate Rick DiPietro would get the start in goal for game two, after recovering from an injury.

The Islanders re-signed Dubielewicz to a one-year contract worth $500,000 for the 2007–2008 season. After the season, on June 1, 2008, Newsday reported that Dubielewicz declined the two-way contract extension the Islanders had offered, as he believed that he'd be assigned to the AHL, as Joey MacDonald had a one-way deal. Dubielewicz had previously voiced a desire to remain an Islander and called himself "an Islander at heart". He signed instead with Ak Bars of the Kontinental Hockey League.

On December 30, 2008, Dubielewicz terminated his contract with Ak Bars by mutual agreement. In the previous month, he was often backing up the younger Stanislav Galimov. Wade left Ak Bars with a record of 11-8-3, a .892 save pct., and 2.77 GAA. After an injury to the Islanders' goaltender Joey MacDonald and with starting goalie Rick DiPietro sidelined, Dubielewicz re-signed with the Islanders on January 15, 2009, but the Columbus Blue Jackets claimed him off re-entry waivers on January 17, 2009. Dubielewicz played the rest of the season for Columbus.

Dubielewicz became a free agent in July 2009 and he signed a contract with the Minnesota Wild on July 17. The Wild had two other goalies with NHL experience and he was signed to improve the depth at the position.

Dubielewicz last played in Germany, having signed with the Kölner Haie on September 30, 2010.

== Coaching career ==
In 2012 Dubielewicz became coach of the Columbia Valley Rockies of the KIJHL. He became the general manager of the team in 2020.

== Career statistics ==
=== Regular season and playoffs ===
			Regular season										Playoffs
Season	Team	League	GP	W	L	T	OTL	MIN	GA	SO	GAA	SV%	GP	W	L	MIN	GA	SO	GAA	SV%
1993–94	Columbia Valley Rockies	KIJHL	—	—	—	—	—	—	—	—	—	—	—	—	—	—	—	—	—	—
1994–95	Columbia Valley Rockies	KIJHL	—	—	—	—	—	—	—	—	—	—	—	—	—	—	—	—	—	—
1994–95	Cranbrook Colts	RMJHL	1	—	—	—	—	6	0	0	0.00	1.000	—	—	—	—	—	—	—	—
1995–96	Fernie Ghostriders	RMJHL	29	12	9	0	—	1281	83	0	3.89	.891	—	—	—	—	—	—	—	—
1996–97	Fernie Ghostriders	RMJHL	34	16	13	1	—	1847	103	3	3.35	.909	—	—	—	—	—	—	—	—
1997–98	Trail Smoke Eaters	BCHL	41	—	—	—	—	2225	118	0	3.18	.888	—	—	—	—	—	—	—	—
1998–99	Trail Smoke Eaters	BCHL	41	—	—	—	—	—	—	—	3.88	.901	—	—	—	—	—	—	—	—
1998–99	Chilliwack Chiefs	BCHL	14	10	4	0	—	834	41	0	2.95	.918	—	—	—	—	—	—	—	—
1999–00	University of Denver	WCHA	13	3	5	1	—	596	27	1	2.72	.902	—	—	—	—	—	—	—	—
2000–01	University of Denver	WCHA	29	12	9	3	—	1542	59	2	2.30	.921	—	—	—	—	—	—	—	—
2001–02	University of Denver	WCHA	24	20	4	0	—	1431	41	2	1.72	.943	—	—	—	—	—	—	—	—
2002–03	University of Denver	WCHA	19	9	8	2	—	1060	43	3	2.43	.912	—	—	—	—	—	—	—	—
2003–04	New York Islanders	NHL	2	1	0	1	—	105	3	0	1.72	.940	—	—	—	—	—	—	—	—
2003–04	Bridgeport Sound Tigers	AHL	33	20	8	5	—	1959	45	9	1.38	.946	3	2	1	181	11	0	3.64	.880
2004–05	Bridgeport Sound Tigers	AHL	43	18	23	1	—	2539	113	1	2.67	.911	—	—	—	—	—	—	—	—
2005–06	New York Islanders	NHL	7	2	3	—	0	310	15	0	2.90	.897	—	—	—	—	—	—	—	—
2005–06	Bridgeport Sound Tigers	AHL	46	20	21	—	2	2575	134	3	3.12	.910	7	3	4	435	16	0	2.21	.933
2006–07	New York Islanders	NHL	8	4	1	—	0	379	13	0	2.06	.934	1	0	1	59	4	0	4.06	.886
2006–07	Bridgeport Sound Tigers	AHL	40	22	12	—	5	2405	108	2	2.69	.923	—	—	—	—	—	—	—	—
2007–08	New York Islanders	NHL	20	9	9	—	1	1132	51	0	2.70	.919	—	—	—	—	—	—	—	—
2007–08	Bridgeport Sound Tigers	AHL	2	1	1	—	0	124	5	0	2.42	.904	—	—	—	—	—	—	—	—
2008–09	Columbus Blue Jackets	NHL	3	1	2	—	0	169	10	0	3.56	.870	—	—	—	—	—	—	—	—
2008–09	Ak Bars Kazan	KHL	21	11	8	—	3	1236	57	0	2.77	.892	—	—	—	—	—	—	—	—
2009–10	Minnesota Wild	NHL	3	1	1	—	0	101	5	0	2.98	.853	—	—	—	—	—	—	—	—
2009–10	Houston Aeros	AHL	32	12	14	—	1	1564	71	0	2.72	.895	—	—	—	—	—	—	—	—
2010–11	Kölner Haie	DEL	12	2	8	—	0	722	47	0	3.90	.879	—	—	—	—	—	—	—	—
NHL totals			43	18	16	1	1	2196	97	0	2.65	.914	1	0	1	59	4	0	4.06	.886

== Awards and honours ==
Award	Year
All-WCHA Second Team	2000–01
All-WCHA First Team	2001–02
AHCA West Second-Team All-American	2001–02
WCHA All-Tournament Team	2002
All-WCHA Second Team	2002–03
AHL All-Rookie Team	2004
AHL Second All-Star Team	2004
AHL Dudley "Red" Garrett Memorial Award	2004
AHL Harry "Hap" Holmes Memorial Award	2004

Awards and achievements
Preceded by Tyler Arnason	WCHA Most Valuable Player in Tournament; 2002	Succeeded by Grant Potulny
