= Eric Pateman =

Canadian chef, and entrepreneur

Eric Pateman is a Canadian chef, and consultant in the food and aviation industries. He currently serves as the Chief Experience Officer & VP, Passenger Experience, at Vancouver International Airport (YVR).

Pateman is best known for his work in the Canadian food and wine industries, including writing the framework for Canada's national culinary tourism strategy and provincial culinary tourism strategies, conducting research projects, running culinary festivals, providing cooking demonstrations, hosting events, and participating at public speaking engagements.

== Businesses ==
Edible Canada was a culinary tourism business founded in 2006 on Granville Island in Vancouver, British Columbia. Founded as Edible Vancouver, the company soon became known as Edible British Columbia, then Edible Canada in 2010. The business included a bistro and retail store on Granville Island, as well as multiple satellite stores throughout British Columbia, including in White Rock, Whistler, Kelowna and Oliver. It also offered tours and culinary events, nationally and internationally. Edible Canada came in 183rd place in the 2014 PROFIT Top 500, which ranks Canada's fastest growing companies. Edible Canada closed during the COVID-19 pandemic in 2020, and the business was sold in 2021. ESP Culinary Consulting is a culinary consulting firm that operated from 2016 to 2023.

In 2022, he joined the Vancouver Airport Authority as Director of Culinary Experience. As the Chief Experience Officer & VP, Passenger Experience, Pateman is accountable for end-to-end passenger experience including retail, food and beverage offerings, guest services, marketing and brand, accessibility, research, the globally recognized art program, Green Coats and commercial services. In November 2025, he left his position of Chief Experience Officer & VP, Passenger Experience at YVR.

Sea to Sky Seasonings is an artisanal salt and seasoning company founded in 2010. Amola, established in 2013, is the rebranded salt division. It was sold to Continental Importers in 2023.

== Culinary tourism projects ==
Pateman works on culinary tourism projects in Canada and other countries including Italy, Australia, New Zealand, Fiji, and the United Kingdom. In 2021, Forbes characterized Pateman as "the tastemaker who's defining countries' entire culinary tourism strategies."

Within Canada, he has worked with most provinces and territories, most notably as the Yukon's Culinary Brand Ambassador and Manager of the Tourism Conference and Strategy, as well as the Developer of the Canadian Seafood Centre of Excellence and Innovation. Some of his other projects have included Canada's National Culinary Tourism Framework, and British Columbia's Culinary Tourism Strategy.

In 2020, he was engaged by Accent Inns to create a restaurant for their newest Hotel Zed location in Tofino. The resulting project, Roar, opened in May 2021, and is focused on seafood and live fire cooking.

== Presentations ==
Pateman has spoken on topics concerning culinary tourism, food and beverage strategies, and Canadian cuisine in general. In April 2018, Pateman took part in Australia's first tourism conference, presenting "How To Use Food To Drive Destination Visitation". Pateman spoke as an industry leader on the development of culinary tourism. Pateman has also presented as an expert guest speaker on "How Canadians Communicate About Food" in Banff, Alberta. Other speaking engagements he has partaken in include:

- Terra Madre Salone del Gusto, Italy (2014)
- Children's Wish Gala (2015)
- Pure Life Experiences Conference in Marrakesh, Morocco (2017)
- United Nations World Travel Organization's Forum on Gastronomy Tourism in San Sebastián, Spain (2017)
- Fairmont Canadian Historical Dinner Series (2017)
- Yukon Culinary Festival (2019)
- SITE Canada Education Day (2020)
- Seafood Expo Asia Reconnect (2020)
- Worldchefs Congress, Russia (2022)
- Global Table, Australia
- GFS Western Conferences, Kelowna and Victoria
- BC Tourism Industry Conference
- Food3000 Conference

== Honors and awards ==
In 2013, Pateman was awarded the Mayor of Vancouver's Arts Awards for Culinary Arts. In 2018, Pateman was nominated by the Royal Canadian Geographical Society (RCGS) as its newest Fellow. Pateman is the first chef who has ever been nominated a Fellow of RCGS; the acknowledgement is awarded to distinguished individuals who not only excel in their fields, but do so while promoting Canadian geographical and cultural knowledge to audiences throughout the globe.

He has also received the following awards:

• Tourism Association of Canada Culinary Tourism Award - Flight Across the Top of Canada

• Mayor of Vancouver Art Awards - Culinary Arts

• Top 40 Foodies Under 40

• Business in Vancouver Top 40 Under 40

== Publications ==
- How Canadians Communicate VI: Food Promotion, Consumption, and Controversy
- British Columbia Seasonal Cookbook 2nd Edition
- British Columbia Seasonal Cookbook 1st Edition
- Olympic Dreams: Assessing the Potential Impact of the 2010 Winter Olympic Games on Greater Vancouver's Hotel Industry
