= Troy Riddle =

American ice hockey player (born 1981)

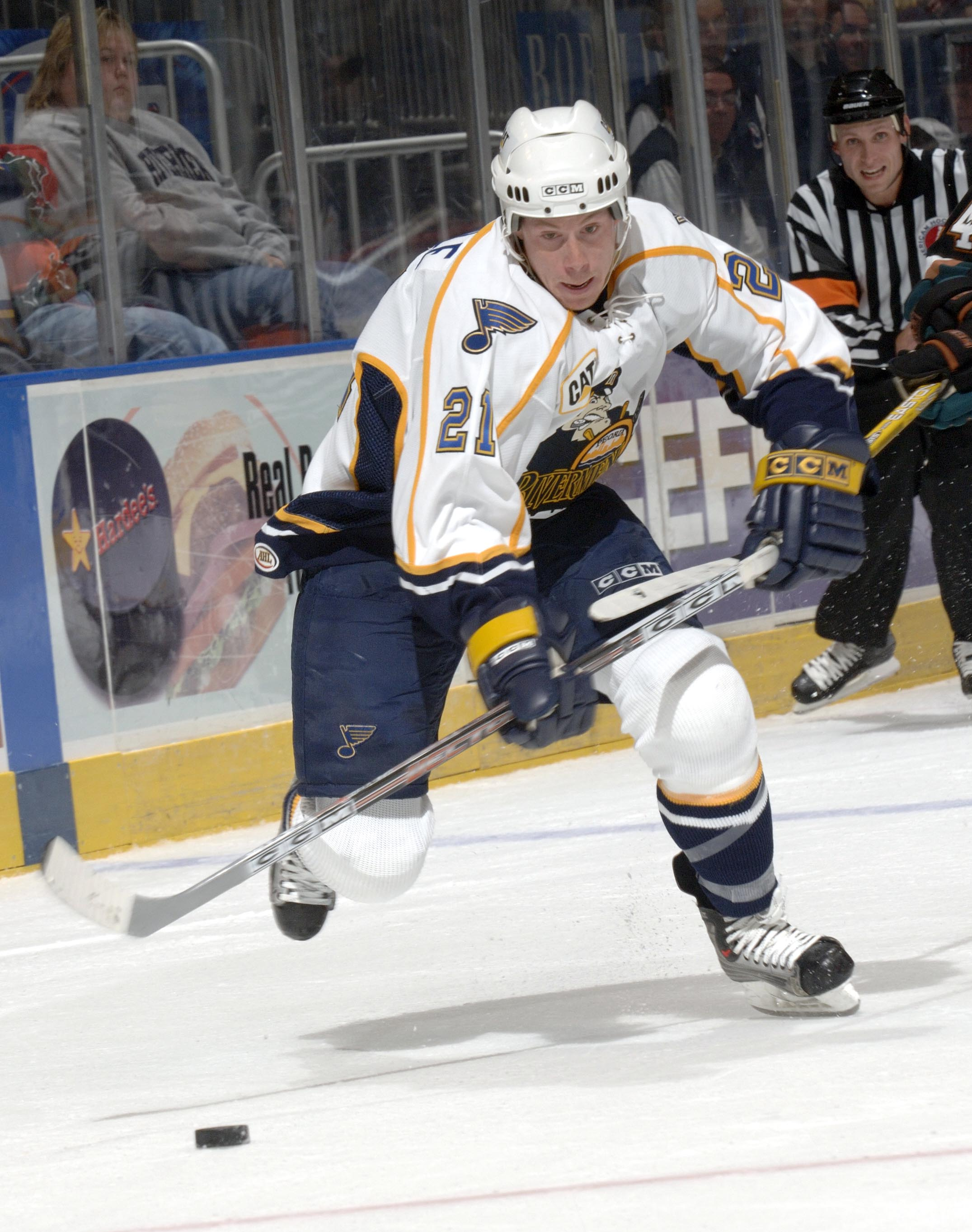
- Born: August 24, 1981 (age 45) Minneapolis, Minnesota, USA
- Height: 5 ft 10 in (178 cm)
- Weight: 174 lb (79 kg; 12 st 6 lb)
- Position: Center
- Shot: Right
- Played for: Minnesota; Worcester IceCats; Peoria Rivermen (ECHL); Peoria Rivermen (AHL); Alaska Aces; Trenton Titans; Philadelphia Phantoms; Houston Aeros; Texas Wildcatters; Graz 99ers EHC Basel; Tulsa Oilers; Tohoku Free Blades
- NHL draft: 129th overall, 2000; St. Louis Blues Coaching career

Current position
- Team: Marquette
- Conference: NCHL

Biographical details
- Education: University of Minnesota

Coaching career (HC unless noted)
- 2010–2011: Benilde-St. Margaret's (asst.)
- 2012–2016: Benilde-St. Margaret's (asst.)
- 2017–2018: Anoka High School (asst.)
- 2022–Present: Marquette
- Playing career: 2004–2012

Troy Riddle (born August 24, 1981) is an American ice hockey coach and former center. He won two National Championships with Minnesota in 2002 and 2003.

== Career ==
Riddle was a high-scoring prospect coming out of high school, averaging more than 3 points per game as a senior. As an 18-year old, he spent a year playing junior hockey with the Des Moines Buccaneers and finished second in team scoring. Afterwards, his performance was strong enough for the St. Louis Blues to select him in the 4th round of the 2000 NHL entry draft. The following fall, Riddle began attending the University of Minnesota and joined the ice hockey program. Straight away he contributed on offense and helped Minnesota make the NCAA tournament for the first time in four years. His production increased during his sophomore season while the team posted a 30-win season and won the national championship. During his junior season, Riddle came to the forefront of the Gopher's offense and his goal scoring saw a dramatic improvement. He finished second on the team in scoring and helped Minnesota capture its second consecutive championship. Riddle was named team captain for his senior season and continued to lead the Gophers on offense. He led Minnesota to its second-consecutive conference championship and fourth-consecutive NCAA tournament appearance while finishing second in team scoring once more.

After graduating with a degree in communications, Riddle signed with the Blues and joined their AHL affiliate the Worcester IceCats. He had a little difficulty catching up to the speed of the professional game and spent some time in the ECHL over the next two years. His stint with the Alaska Aces ended with the team winning its first Kelly Cup. After two years in the Blues' organization, Riddle was not retained and he spent the 2007 season with the Trenton Titans. After another year playing in the Minnesota Wild's pipeline, Riddle headed to Europe.

Riddle spent the 2009 season with the Graz 99ers producing moderate offensive numbers. After beginning the following year with EHC Basel, he returned to North America and finished out the year with the Tulsa Oilers. Riddle retired as a player after the season and became an assistant coach at his alma mater, Benilde-St. Margaret's. A year later, Riddle signed on with the Tohoku Free Blades and though he played well, finishing second in scoring, the team did not and missed the postseason. After the year, Riddle hung up his skated for good and returned to St. Margaret's.

Over the next decade, Riddle worked several jobs in the Minneapolis including as an assistant coach and skate instructor. In 2022, he was named as the head coach for the club team at Marquette.

== Career statistics ==
=== Regular season and playoffs ===
			Regular season					Playoffs
Season	Team	League	GP	G	A	Pts	PIM	GP	G	A	Pts	PIM
1997–98	Benilde–St. Margaret's	HSMN	25	33	35	68		—	—	—	—	—
1998–99	Benilde–St. Margaret's	HSMN	28	54	45	99		—	—	—	—	—
1999–2000	Des Moines Buccaneers	USHL	53	36	30	66	95	8	2	2	4	31
2000–01	University of Minnesota	WCHA	38	16	14	30	49	—	—	—	—	—
2001–02	University of Minnesota	WCHA	44	16	31	47	46	—	—	—	—	—
2002–03	University of Minnesota	WCHA	45	26	25	51	50	—	—	—	—	—
2003–04	University of Minnesota	WCHA	44	24	25	49	52	—	—	—	—	—
2004–05	Worcester IceCats	AHL	42	9	6	15	35	—	—	—	—	—
2004–05	Peoria Rivermen	ECHL	14	4	8	12	16	—	—	—	—	—
2005–06	Peoria Rivermen	AHL	55	11	11	22	47	—	—	—	—	—
2005–06	Alaska Aces	ECHL	7	2	2	4	6	21	4	3	7	28
2006–07	Philadelphia Phantoms	AHL	3	0	0	0	0	—	—	—	—	—
2006–07	Trenton Titans	ECHL	68	28	37	65	60	5	3	2	5	10
2007–08	Houston Aeros	AHL	32	4	5	9	19	—	—	—	—	—
2007–08	Texas Wildcatters	ECHL	22	6	12	18	26	8	1	0	1	8
2008–09	Graz 99ers	AUT	52	11	13	24	68	7	0	1	1	4
2009–10	EHC Basel	SUI.2	7	1	3	4	8	—	—	—	—	—
2009–10	Tulsa Oilers	CHL	57	19	24	43	60	—	—	—	—	—
2011–12	Tohoku Free Blades	ALH	36	16	13	29	60	—	—	—	—	—
AHL totals			132	24	22	46	101	—	—	—	—	—
ECHL totals			111	40	59	99	108	34	8	5	13	46

=== International ===
Year	Team	Event	Result	GP	G	A	Pts	PIM
2001	United States	WJC	5th	7	0	1	1	6
Junior totals				7	0	1	1	6

== Awards and honors ==
Award	Year
All-WCHA Rookie Team	2000–01
WCHA All-Tournament Team	2002
All-WCHA Third Team	2002–03
