= Kevin Reiter =

American ice hockey player (born 1981)

- Born: November 4, 1981 (age 43); Pittsburgh, Pennsylvania, United States
- Height: 5 ft 10 in (178 cm)
- Weight: 175 lb (79 kg; 12 st 7 lb)
- Position: Goaltender
- Caught: Left
- Played for: Missouri River Otters (UHL); Phoenix RoadRunners (ECHL); Laredo Bucks (Central Hockey League); Fort Wayne Komets (CHL)
- Playing career: 2004–2011

Kevin Reiter (born November 4, 1981) is an American former professional ice hockey goaltender. He last played in the Central Hockey League with the Fort Wayne Komets and retired from playing after the 2010–11 season. From 2013-2017, he worked as the goaltending coach for the USA Hockey National Team Development Program. He is currently serving as the assistant coach/goaltending coach at the University of Michigan.

Reiter spent four seasons with the University of Alaska Anchorage before turning professional in 2004, signing with the Missouri River Otters for two seasons. In 2004–05, Reiter and teammate Jason Tapp set a new UHL record for the most shutouts in one season. He then moved on to the Central Hockey League with the Laredo Bucks and the ECHL with the Phoenix RoadRunners. In 2007, he signed with the Fort Wayne Komets of the International Hockey League and went on to win the IHL Turner Cup that season. In 2008, Reiter moved to the United Kingdom and signed with the Basingstoke Bison for the 2008–09 season. In July 2009, Reiter signed with the league champions Sheffield Steelers to replace their outgoing goalie Jody Lehman. However, due to a hernia and torn abdominal muscle, Reiter was released by the Steelers and went on to play for the Newcastle Vipers. After starting netminder Michel Robinson recovered from his injury Reiter returned to Pittsburgh to rehab his injury. In 2010, Reiter rejoined the Fort Wayne Komets in their first season in the Central Hockey League.
