= 2001 CCHA men's ice hockey tournament =

Sports tournament

2001 CCHA Men's ice hockey tournament
- Dates: March 8–17, 2001
- Teams: 10
- Finals site: Joe Louis Arena; Detroit, Michigan
- Champions: Michigan State (10th title)
- Winning coach: Ron Mason (13th title)
- MVP: Ryan Miller (Michigan State)
- CCHA Men's Ice Hockey Tournaments

The 2001 CCHA Men's Ice Hockey Tournament was the 30th CCHA Men's Ice Hockey Tournament. It was played between March 8 and March 17, 2001. First round and play-in games were played at campus sites, while all 'final four' games were played at Joe Louis Arena in Detroit, Michigan. By winning the tournament, Michigan State won the inaugural Mason Cup (named after head coach Ron Mason) and received the Central Collegiate Hockey Association's automatic bid to the 2001 NCAA Division I Men's Ice Hockey Tournament.

== Format ==
The tournament featured four rounds of play. The two teams that finish below tenth place in the standings were not eligible for postseason play. In the First Round, the first and tenth seeds, the second and ninth seeds, the third and eighth seeds, the fourth and seventh seeds and the fifth and sixth seeds played a best-of-three series, with the top three ranked winners advancing to the semifinals and two lower-seeded teams playing in a single play-in game to determine the final qualifier. In the semifinals, the remaining highest and lowest seeds and second highest and second lowest seeds play a single-game, with the winners advancing to the finals. The tournament champion receives an automatic bid to the 2001 NCAA Men's Division I Ice Hockey Tournament.

== Conference standings ==
Note: GP = Games played; W = Wins; L = Losses; T = Ties; PTS = Points; GF = Goals For; GA = Goals Against

2000–01 Central Collegiate Hockey Association standings
| | Conference | | | | | | | Overall | | | | | |
| | GP | W | L | T | PTS | GF | GA | GP | W | L | T | GF | GA |
|---|---|---|---|---|---|---|---|---|---|---|---|---|---|
| #3 Michigan State†* | 28 | 21 | 4 | 3 | 45 | 86 | 37 | 42 | 33 | 5 | 4 | 134 | 57 |
| Miami | 28 | 17 | 10 | 1 | 35 | 95 | 71 | 38 | 20 | 16 | 2 | 120 | 108 |
| #4 Michigan | 28 | 16 | 9 | 3 | 35 | 102 | 60 | 45 | 27 | 13 | 5 | 167 | 110 |
| #13 Nebraska-Omaha | 28 | 15 | 10 | 3 | 33 | 86 | 80 | 42 | 24 | 15 | 3 | 127 | 107 |
| Northern Michigan | 28 | 12 | 10 | 6 | 30 | 76 | 71 | 38 | 18 | 13 | 7 | 121 | 102 |
| Western Michigan | 28 | 12 | 10 | 6 | 30 | 97 | 96 | 39 | 20 | 13 | 6 | 149 | 129 |
| Ohio State | 28 | 13 | 13 | 2 | 28 | 81 | 89 | 37 | 17 | 18 | 2 | 118 | 117 |
| Ferris State | 28 | 9 | 15 | 4 | 22 | 64 | 81 | 38 | 13 | 20 | 5 | 91 | 112 |
| Bowling Green | 28 | 8 | 15 | 5 | 21 | 72 | 82 | 40 | 16 | 19 | 5 | 109 | 110 |
| Alaska-Fairbanks | 28 | 7 | 14 | 7 | 21 | 67 | 91 | 36 | 9 | 19 | 8 | 90 | 112 |
| Notre Dame | 28 | 7 | 15 | 6 | 20 | 72 | 98 | 39 | 10 | 22 | 7 | 104 | 150 |
| Lake Superior State | 28 | 8 | 20 | 0 | 16 | 53 | 95 | 36 | 13 | 23 | 0 | 79 | 119 |
Championship: Michigan State † indicates conference regular season champion * indicates conference tournament champion Final rankings: USA Today/American Hockey Magazine Poll Top 15 Poll

== Bracket ==
First Round; March 8–11
1 | Michigan State | 5 | 3* | –
10 | Alaska-Fairbanks | 2 | 2 | –
2 | Miami | 3 | 3 | –
9 | Bowling Green | 4 | 4* | –
3 | Michigan | 8 | 3 | –
8 | Ferris State | 3 | 0 | –
4 | Nebraska-Omaha | 4 | 2 | 4**
7 | Ohio State | 5* | 1 | 3
5 | Northern Michigan | 3* | 7 | 5*
6 | Western Michigan | 2 | 9 | 4

Play-In; March 13
5 | Northern Michigan | 1
9 | Bowling Green | 2*

Semifinals; March 16
1 | Michigan State | 2
9 | Bowling Green | 1
3 | Michigan | 3
4 | Nebraska-Omaha | 2

Championship; March 17
1 | Michigan State | 2
3 | Michigan | 0

Note: * denotes overtime period(s)

=== First round ===
==== (1) Michigan State vs. (10) Alaska-Fairbanks ====
| March 9 | Michigan State | 5 – 2 | Alaska-Fairbanks | Munn Ice Arena | Recap |
| Sean Patchell - PP - 03:48; Adam Hall - PP - 08:40; Brian Maloney - GW SH - 17:40 | | First period | 12:36 - Jim Lawrence |
| No scoring | | Second period | No scoring |
| Brian Maloney - 03:29; Rustyn Dolyny - PP - 11:38 | | Third period | 16:33 - Pat Hallett |
| Ryan Miller ( 32 saves / 34 shots ) | | Goalie stats | Preston McKay ( 26 saves / 31 shots ) |

| March 10 | Michigan State | 3 – 2 | OT | Alaska-Fairbanks | Munn Ice Arena | Recap |
| Brian Maloney - 16:28 | | First period | | 03:36 - PP - Ryan Lang; 17:00 - Scott McIlroy |
| No scoring | | Second period | | No scoring |
| John Nail - PP - 17:18 | | Third period | | No scoring |
| Sean Patchell - GW - 07:18 | | First overtime period | | No scoring |
| Ryan Miller ( 31 saves / 33 shots ) | | Goalie stats | | Preston McKay ( 41 saves / 44 shots ) |

| Michigan State won series 2–0 |

==== (2) Miami vs. (9) Bowling Green ====
| March 8 | Miami | 3 – 4 | Bowling Green | Goggin Ice Arena | Recap |
| Pat Leahy - 15:23 | | First period | 12:39 - Marc Barlow |
| Evan Cheverie - 03:47 | | Second period | No scoring |
| A.J. Kratofil - 02:15 | | Third period | 05:48 - Tyler Knight; 10:22 - Scott Hewson; 15:36 - GW PP - Ryan Murphy |
| David Burleigh ( 22 saves / 26 shots ) | | Goalie stats | Tyler Masters ( 34 saves / 37 shots ) |

| March 9 | Miami | 3 - 4 | OT | Bowling Green | Goggin Ice Arena | Recap |
| Pat Leahy - PP - 10:46 | | First period | | No scoring |
| No scoring | | Second period | | No scoring |
| Evan Cheverie - 11:02; Nick Jardine - 18:38 | | Third period | | 02:40 - PP - Marc Barlow; 09:18 - Ryan Murphy; 11:32 - PP - Ryan Murphy |
| No scoring | | First overtime period | | 09:55 - Grady Moore |
| David Burleigh ( 22 saves / 26 shots ) | | Goalie stats | | Tyler Masters ( 36 saves / 39 shots ) |

| Bowling Green won series 2–0 |

==== (3) Michigan vs. (8) Ferris State ====
| March 9 | Michigan | 8 – 3 | Ferris State | Yost Ice Arena | Recap |
| Mike Cammalleri - PP - 04:13; Mark Kosick - 13:51; Josh Langfeld - PP - 15:56 | | First period | No scoring |
| Andy Hilbert - GW PP - 09:21; Bill Trainor - 13:07; Joe Kautz - 16:27 | | Second period | 05:44 - Kevin Swider; 07:58 - PP - Kevin Swider |
| Mike Cammalleri - 18:18; Andy Hilbert - 19:15 | | Third period | 18:31 - Jon Rogger |
| Josh Blackburn ( 13 saves / 16 shots ) | | Goalie stats | Phil Osaer ( 26 saves / 32 shots ) / Vince Owen ( 10 saves / 12 shots ) |

| March 10 | Michigan | 3 – 0 | Ferris State | Yost Ice Arena | Recap |
| No Scoring | | First period | No scoring |
| Josh Langfeld - GW PP - 04:48; Mike Cammalleri - PP - 11:35 | | Second period | No scoring |
| Geoff Koch - EN - 19:52 | | Third period | No scoring |
| Josh Blackburn ( 18 saves / 18 shots ) | | Goalie stats | Phil Osaer ( 25 saves / 27 shots ) |

| Michigan won series 2–0 |

==== (4) Nebraska-Omaha vs. (7) Ohio State ====
| March 9 | Nebraska-Omaha | 4 – 5 | OT | Ohio State | Omaha Civic Auditorium | Recap |
| Jeff Hoggan - 00:55 | | First period | | No scoring |
| No scoring | | Second period | | 01:38 - PP - Dave Steckel; 02:37 - Scott May; 18:58 - PP - Jean-Francois Dufour |
| David Brisson - PP - 02:02; Greg Zanon - PP - 10:25; Dave Noel-Bernier - 16:54 | | Third period | | 17:44 - Eric Skaug |
| No scoring | | First overtime period | | 00:38 - Miguel LeFleche |
| Dan Ellis ( 27 saves / 32 shots ) | | Goalie stats | | Mike Betz ( 23 saves / 27 shots ) |

| March 10 | Nebraska-Omaha | 2 – 1 | Ohio State | Omaha Civic Auditorium | Recap |
| Billy Pugliese - 05:25 | | First period | No scoring |
| David Brisson - GW - 12:05 | | Second period | No scoring |
| No scoring | | Third period | 10:09 - Miguel LeFleche |
| Dan Ellis ( 18 saves / 19 shots ) | | Goalie stats | Mike Betz ( 21 saves / 23 shots ) |

| March 11 | Nebraska-Omaha | 4 – 3 | 2OT | Ohio State | Omaha Civic Auditorium | Recap |
| David Brisson - PP - 17:29 | | First period | | 08:13 - PP - Paul Caponigri |
| No scoring | | Second period | | 08:07 - Daymen Bencharski |
| Dave Noel-Bernier - 01:26; Billy Pugliese - 18:25 | | Third period | | 18:55 - EA - Paul Caponigri |
| Billy Pugliese - GW - 07:31 | | Second overtime period | | No scoring |
| Dan Ellis ( 44 saves / 47 shots ) | | Goalie stats | | Mike Betz ( 36 saves / 40 shots ) |

| Nebraska-Omaha won series 2–1 |

==== (5) Northern Michigan vs. (6) Western Michigan ====
| March 9 | Northern Michigan | 3 – 2 | OT | Western Michigan | Berry Events Center | Recap |
| Dan Donette - 12:57 | | First period | | No scoring |
| No scoring | | Second period | | 12:16 - Dana Lattery; 18:25 - Mike Bishai |
| Jim Jackson - PP - 16:27 | | Third period | | No scoring |
| Fred Mattersdorfer - GW - 11:54 | | First overtime period | | No scoring |
| Dan Ragusett ( 26 saves / 28 shots ) | | Goalie stats | | Jeff Reynaert ( 27 saves / 30 shots ) |

| March 10 | Northern Michigan | 7 – 9 | Western Michigan | Berry Events Center | Recap |
| Brent Robertson - 18:34 | | First period | No scoring |
| Bryce Cockburn - 18:34; Fred Mattersdorfer - 11:14; Jim Jackson - 14:59 | | Second period | 00:18 - Dana Lattery; 02:10 - Lucas Drake; 10:52 - Steve Rymsha; 13:44 - Anthony Battaglia; 18:08 - PP - Mike Jarmuth |
| Justin Kinunen - 07:03; Fred Mattersdorfer - 13:43; Alex Sawruk - 14:24 | | Third period | 02:02 - Mike Bishai; 04:22 - Steve Rymsha; 07:59 - GW - Jeff Campbell; 18:08 - EN - Jeff Campbell |
| Dan Ragusett ( 15 saves / 20 shots ) / Craig Kowalski ( 6 saves / 9 shots ) | | Goalie stats | Jeff Reynaert ( 27 saves / 34 shots ) |

| March 11 | Northern Michigan | 5 – 4 | OT | Western Michigan | Berry Events Center | Recap |
| Fred Mattersdorfer - PP - 17:12 | | First period | | 01:26 - Steve Rymsha; 10:04 - PP - Dana Lattery; 12:16 - SH - Mike Bishai |
| Terry Harrison - 02:01; Bryce Cockburn - PP - 18:23 | | Second period | | 07:36 - SH - Jeff Campbell |
| Terry Harrison - 01:16 | | Third period | | No scoring |
| Ryan Riipi - GW - 11:40 | | First overtime period | | No scoring |
| Dan Ragusett ( 26 saves / 28 shots ) | | Goalie stats | | Jeff Reynaert ( 27 saves / 30 shots ) |

| Northern Michigan won series 2–1 |

=== Play-in ===
==== (5) Northern Michigan vs. (9) Bowling Green ====
| March 13 | Northern Michigan | 1 – 2 | Bowling Green | Berry Events Center | Recap |
| No Scoring | | First period | 14:23 - Ryan Wetterberg |
| Mike Sandbeck - PP - 12:27 | | Second period | No scoring |
| No scoring | | Third period | No scoring |
| No scoring | | overtime period | 14:54 - GW - Dennis Williams |
| Dan Ragusett ( 27 saves / 29 shots ) | | Goalie stats | Tyler Masters ( 37 saves / 38 shots ) |

=== Semifinals ===
==== (1) Michigan State vs. (5) Northern Michigan ====
| March 16 | Michigan State | 2 – 1 | Northern Michigan | Joe Louis Arena | Recap |
| Sean Patchell - 16:36 | | First period | 19:22 - Kevin Bieksa |
| Sean Patchell - GW - 15:56 | | Second period | No scoring |
| No scoring | | Third period | No scoring |
| Ryan Miller ( 28 saves / 29 shots ) | | Goalie stats | Tyler Masters ( 33 saves / 35 shots ) |

==== (3) Michigan vs. (4) Nebraska-Omaha ====
| March 16 | Michigan | 3 – 2 | Nebraska-Omaha | Joe Louis Arena | Recap |
| Craig Murray - 07:25; Mike Cammalleri - 09:52; Joe Kautz - GW - 18:26 | | First period | No scoring |
| No scoring | | Second period | 10:02 - Scott Turner; 15:50 - Greg Zanon |
| No scoring | | Third period | No scoring |
| Josh Blackburn ( 16 saves / 18 shots ) | | Goalie stats | Dan Ellis ( 31 saves / 34 shots ) |

=== Championship ===
==== (1) Michigan State vs. (3) Michigan ====
| March 17 | Michigan State | 2 – 0 | Michigan | Joe Louis Arena | Recap |
| Joe Goodenow - GW - 09:44; Adam Hall - 19:38 | | First period | No scoring |
| No scoring | | Second period | No scoring |
| No scoring | | Third period | No scoring |
| Ryan Miller ( 19 saves / 19 shots ) | | Goalie stats | Josh Blackburn ( 24 saves / 26 shots ) |

== Tournament awards ==
=== All-Tournament Team ===
- F Adam Hall (Michigan State)
- F Sean Patchell (Michigan State)
- F Joe Kautz (Michigan)
- D Andrew Hutchinson (Michigan State)
- D Dave Huntzkicker (Michigan)
- G Ryan Miller* (Michigan State)

* Most Valuable Player(s)
