= Patrick Rissmiller =

American ice hockey player and coach

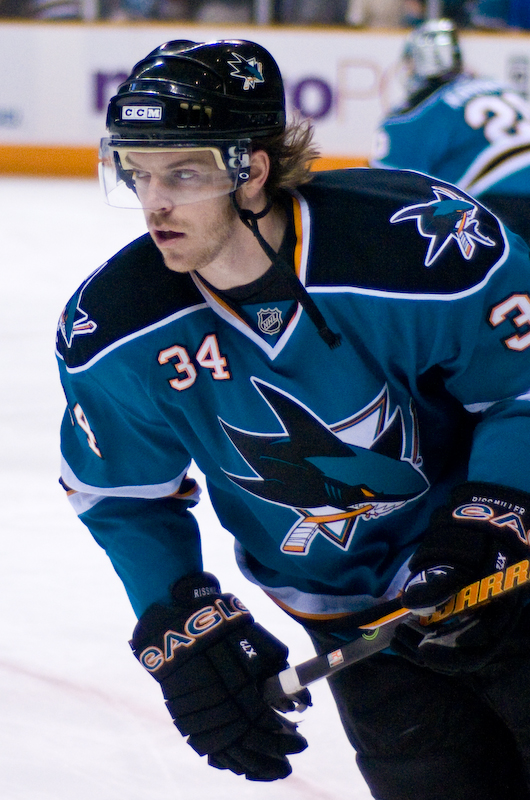
- Born: October 26, 1978 (age 47) Belmont, Massachusetts, U.S.
- Height: 6 ft 4 in (193 cm)
- Weight: 225 lb (102 kg; 16 st 1 lb)
- Position: Left wing
- Shot: Left
- Played for: San Jose Sharks; New York Rangers; Atlanta Thrashers; Florida Panthers
- NHL draft: Undrafted
- Playing career: 2002–2015

Patrick Rissmiller (born October 26, 1978) is an American former professional ice hockey winger who played in the National Hockey League for the San Jose Sharks, New York Rangers, Atlanta Thrashers, and the Florida Panthers. He joined the Anaheim Ducks as a scout for the 2022–23 season after seven years as a development coach for the New Jersey Devils.

== Early life ==
Rissmiller was born in Boston and grew up in Belmont, Massachusetts. He is the fourth of eight children of David and Patricia Rissmiller. He attended Belmont High School (where he was cut from the varsity hockey team), but transferred to Williston Northampton School. He completed a post-graduate year at The Hill School before attending the College of the Holy Cross.

== Playing career ==
=== Amateur ===
Rissmiller played at the College of the Holy Cross of the NCAA. He is considered to be one of the best male hockey player to ever come from that college. Rissmiller's best season was when he scored 16 goals and added 30 assists in 2001–2002. He was noted for his physical domination and strong two-way play for Holy Cross. In total, he scored 53 goals and 90 assists in 131 games for the college. Undrafted, he signed his first pro contract with the San Jose Sharks.

=== Professional ===
In 2002–03, he had 14 goals and 26 assists in 72 games for the Cleveland Barons of the AHL. In the midst of the 2003–04 season, Rissmiller was called up to San Jose, where he registered no points in four games. That year, however, he had 14 goals and 31 assists in 75 games in the AHL. Continuing to gain experience, Rissmiller played the year of the NHL lockout in Cleveland and potted 21 goals and 23 assists in 69 games playing on the top line. In the 2005–06 season, Rissmiller put up 15 goals and 32 assists in 68 games, before injuries to the Sharks gave Rissmiller a chance to play in the NHL. In the 2006–07 season, Rissmiller totaled 22 points for the Sharks including 7 goals and 15 assists. On April 27, 2006 Rissmiller scored his first career playoff goal off a deflection from a shot taken by fellow rookie Matt Carle.

He signed a two-year-contract worth $990,000 in August 2006. Rissmiller suffered a shoulder separation and a broken foot in the 2006 playoffs. However, he played (and scored one goal) until San Jose was eliminated by the Edmonton Oilers. In the 2006–07 season, in Game 1 of the Western Conference Quarterfinals, Rissmiller scored the game-winning goal in the second overtime against the Nashville Predators.

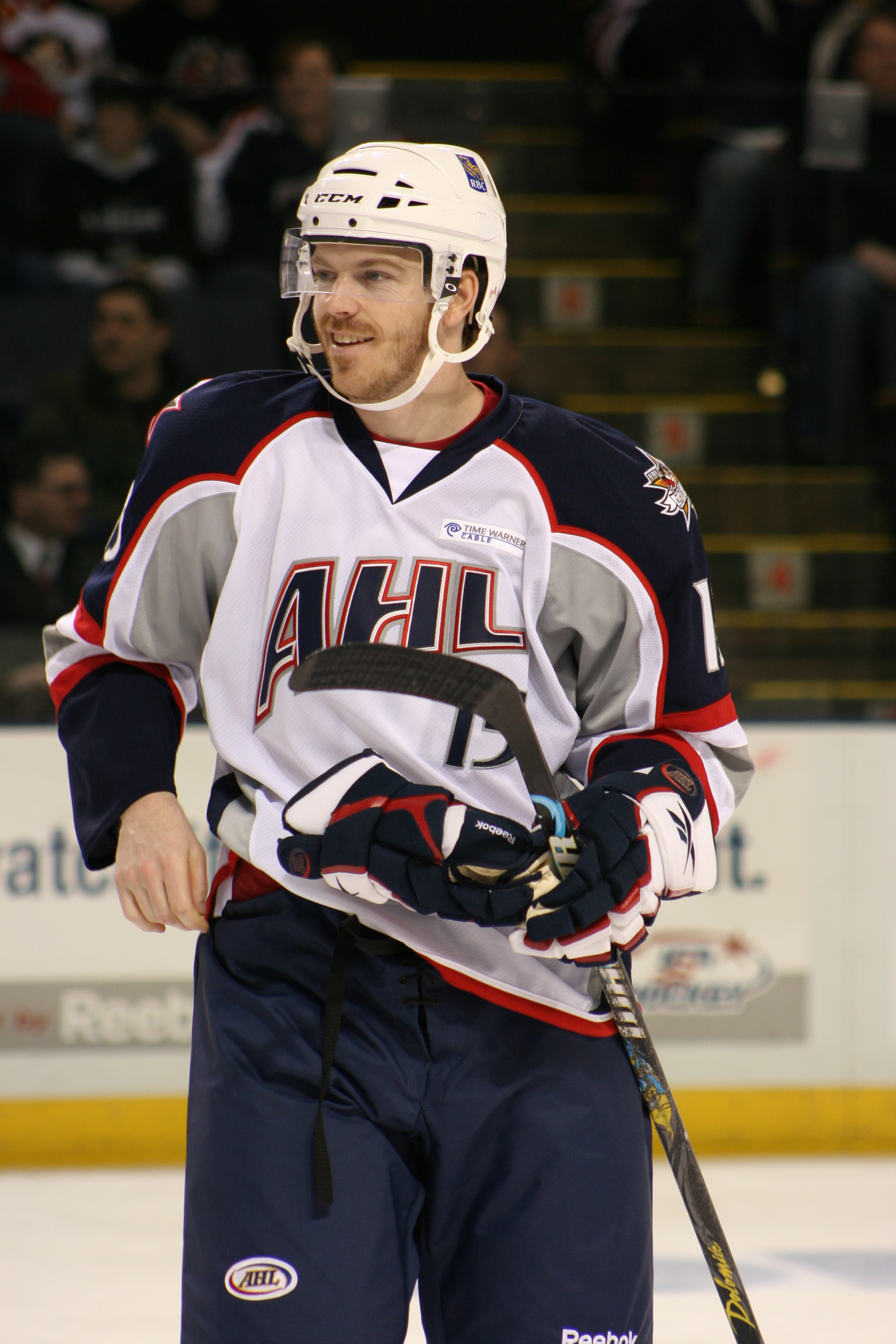
Rissmiller at the AHL All-Star Game in 2010

On July 1, 2008, he signed as a free agent to a 3-year, $3 million contract with the New York Rangers. Rissmiller started the 2008–09 season with the Rangers and was injured in his Rangers debut, a 4-3 victory against the Philadelphia Flyers on October 11, 2008. Failing to secure a place upon his recovery, Rissmiller played in only 2 games with New York before he was assigned on a conditioning assignment to AHL affiliate, the Hartford Wolf Pack on November 12, 2008. After completing his assignment and without a role on the Rangers, he was then returned to the Wolf Pack for the duration of the season on December 2, 2008. In 64 games with Hartford, he finished third in team scoring with assists, and 54 points.

In the following 2009–10 season, Rissmiller remained in the AHL with the Wolf Pack. He recorded two assists in 6 games before he was reassigned by the Rangers to fellow AHL team, the Grand Rapids Griffins. In 63 appearances for the Griffins, Rissmiller finished second on the team in scoring with 45 points.

On August 2, 2010, Rissmiller's disappointing tenure with the Rangers concluded when he was traded, along with Donald Brashear, to the Atlanta Thrashers in exchange for center Todd White. Failing to make the Thrasher's roster prior to the 2010–11 season, Rissmiller was again demoted to the AHL to affiliate, the Chicago Wolves for the last year of his contract. Due to the Wolves exceeding number of veteran players, Rissmiller was limited to 6 games with the Wolves before on November 20, 2010, Rissmiller was reassigned by the Thrashers to the Lake Erie Monsters of the AHL, marking a return to Cleveland from his previous four-year tenure with the Barons. On December 3, 2010, Rissmiller set a franchise record for the Monsters for most goals in a game with 4.

After scoring 30 points in 42 games for the Monsters, Rissmiller was recalled and made a lone appearance for the Atlanta Thrashers in a 4-1 defeat to the Buffalo Sabres on February 23, 2011. He was then briefly returned to the Monsters before he was traded on February 28, 2011 to the Florida Panthers, along with Niclas Bergfors, in exchange for Radek Dvořák and a fifth-round draft pick.

On July 12, 2011, Rissmiller signed a one-year contract with the Colorado Avalanche, the NHL affiliate of Lake Erie. In a season blighted by injury, Rissmiller was unable to earn a recall to the Avalanche. In 49 games with the Monsters, Rissmiller produced 29 points to still finish fifth amongst forwards.

With the impending 2012–13 NHL lockout affecting his status as a Free Agent. Rissmiller waited until an agreement was reached before signing a professional try-out contract with the Worcester Sharks on January 9, 2013, marking a return of sorts to the San Jose Sharks organization. In 6 games with Worcester, he tallied two assists before he was released and subsequently signed on a try-out for a second stint with the Rochester Americans of the AHL on February 2, 2013.

Rissmiller finished his playing career with two seasons played for Ritten-Renon of the Italian Serie A.

== Career statistics ==
			Regular season					Playoffs
Season	Team	League	GP	G	A	Pts	PIM	GP	G	A	Pts	PIM
1993-94	Belmont High School	USHS-MA		2	6	8
1998–99	Holy Cross	MAAC	34	13	28	41	0	—	—	—	—	—
1999–00	Holy Cross	MAAC	35	10	17	27	22	—	—	—	—	—
2000–01	Holy Cross	MAAC	29	14	15	29	40	—	—	—	—	—
2001–02	Holy Cross	MAAC	33	16	30	46	31	—	—	—	—	—
2002–03	Cincinnati Cyclones	ECHL	2	2	2	4	0	—	—	—	—	—
2002–03	Cleveland Barons	AHL	72	14	26	40	24	—	—	—	—	—
2003–04	Cleveland Barons	AHL	75	14	31	45	66	9	0	1	1	8
2003–04	San Jose Sharks	NHL	4	0	0	0	0	—	—	—	—	—
2004–05	Cleveland Barons	AHL	69	21	23	44	50	—	—	—	—	—
2005–06	Cleveland Barons	AHL	68	15	37	52	30	—	—	—	—	—
2005–06	San Jose Sharks	NHL	18	3	3	6	8	11	2	1	3	6
2006–07	San Jose Sharks	NHL	79	7	15	22	22	11	1	3	4	0
2007–08	San Jose Sharks	NHL	79	8	9	17	30	8	0	0	0	4
2008–09	New York Rangers	NHL	2	0	0	0	0	—	—	—	—	—
2008–09	Hartford Wolf Pack	AHL	64	14	40	54	24	6	0	1	1	6
2009–10	Hartford Wolf Pack	AHL	6	0	2	2	8	—	—	—	—	—
2009–10	Grand Rapids Griffins	AHL	63	20	25	45	18	—	—	—	—	—
2010–11	Chicago Wolves	AHL	6	1	0	1	6	—	—	—	—	—
2010–11	Lake Erie Monsters	AHL	43	11	19	30	10	—	—	—	—	—
2010–11	Atlanta Thrashers	NHL	1	0	0	0	0	—	—	—	—	—
2010–11	Rochester Americans	AHL	8	2	8	10	6	—	—	—	—	—
2010–11	Florida Panthers	NHL	9	0	1	1	0	—	—	—	—	—
2011–12	Lake Erie Monsters	AHL	49	13	16	29	34	—	—	—	—	—
2012–13	Worcester Sharks	AHL	6	0	2	2	2	—	—	—	—	—
2012–13	Rochester Americans	AHL	25	3	10	13	8	3	0	0	0	4
2013–14	Ritten Renon	ITL	25	9	16	25	18	17	8	14	22	22
2014–15	Ritten Renon	ITL	29	12	21	33	64	16	8	6	14	34
NHL totals			192	18	28	46	60	30	3	4	7	10

== Awards and honors ==
Award	Year
All-MAAC Rookie Team	1998-99
All-MAAC First Team	2001-02
Walter Brown Award Finalist	2001-02
AHL PlanetUSA All-Star	2006
Cleveland Barons Most Valuable Player	2005–06
Italian Championship	2013-2014
Italian Cup	2013-2014; 2014-2015

Awards and achievements
Preceded by Ryan Manitowich	MAAC Offensive Player of the Year; 2001–02	Succeeded by Brandon Doria
