= Junior Lessard =

Canadian ice hockey player

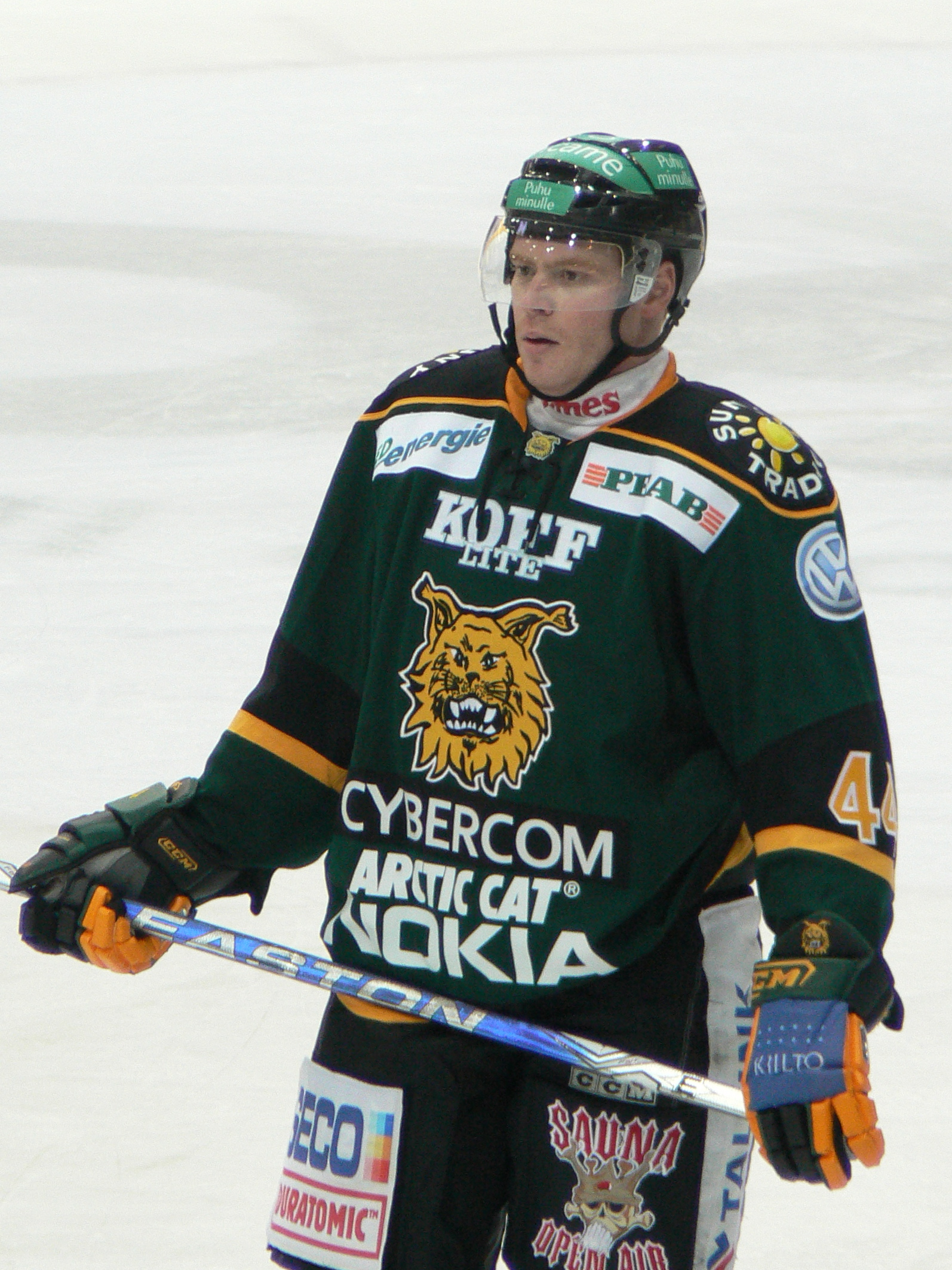
- Born: May 26, 1980 (age 45) Saint-Joseph-de-Beauce, Quebec, Canada
- Height: 5 ft 11 in (180 cm)
- Weight: 191 lb (87 kg; 13 st 9 lb)
- Position: Right wing/Centre
- Shot: Right
- LNAH team Former teams: Thetford Mines Isothermic; Dallas Stars; Tampa Bay Lightning; Ilves; Augsburger Panther
- NHL draft: Undrafted
- Playing career: 2004–2011

Lucien Lessard Jr. (born May 26, 1980), known as Junior Lessard, is a Canadian former professional ice hockey player who last played for the Thetford Mines Isothermic of the LNAH.

== Playing career ==
As a youth, Lessard played in the 1993 and 1994 Quebec International Pee-Wee Hockey Tournaments with a minor ice hockey team from Beauce, Quebec.

Lessard attended the University of Minnesota Duluth, where he led the NCAA in goals (32) and points (63) as a senior during the 2003–04 season, numbers that would be good enough to win the Hobey Baker Award. He also led the WCHA in the same categories with 19 goals and 39 points in conference play.

On April 15, 2004, Lessard signed a free agent contract with the Dallas Stars and made his NHL debut during the 2005–06 season.

Lessard was traded to Tampa Bay on January 15, 2008, in exchange for Dan Jancevski.

Lessard signed a contract with the Atlanta Thrashers on July 9, 2008, and was assigned to affiliate the Chicago Wolves to start the 2008–09 season.

On January 13, 2009, Lessard was traded by the Thrashers to the New York Islanders for Brett Skinner and was immediately sent to the Islanders' AHL affiliate, the Bridgeport Sound Tigers.

On October 7, 2009, Lessard signed a one-year contract with SM-liiga team Ilves, but was released on November 4 due to injury after only four games.

On January 13, 2010, Lessard signed with Canadian semi-pro team the Thetford Mines Isothermic of the LNAH.

On February 1, 2010, after recovering from injury, Lessard signed with German team Augsburger Panther of the DEL for the remainder of the season.

== Awards and honors ==
Award	Year
WCHA All-Tournament Team	2003
All-WCHA First Team	2003–04
AHCA West First-Team All-American	2003–04
All-NCAA All-Tournament Team	2004

- 1998–99 -MJHL All-Rookie Team
- 1999–00 -MJHL First All-Star Team
- 1999–00 -MJHL Most Valuable Player
- Named Canadian Junior A Hockey League Player of the Year with the Portage Terriers of the Manitoba Junior Hockey League
- 2003–04 -WCHA Player of the Year
- 2003–04 -NCAA Hobey Baker Award
- National Player of the Year honors in 2004 by College Hockey Online and Inside College Hockey

== Career statistics ==
			Regular season					Playoffs
Season	Team	League	GP	G	A	Pts	PIM	GP	G	A	Pts	PIM
1998–99	Portage Terriers	MJHL	60	20	41	61	129	—	—	—	—	—
1999–2000	Portage Terriers	MJHL	60	60	48	108	61	—	—	—	—	—
2000–01	University of Minnesota Duluth	WCHA	36	4	8	12	12	—	—	—	—	—
2001–02	University of Minnesota Duluth	WCHA	39	17	13	30	50	—	—	—	—	—
2002–03	University of Minnesota Duluth	WCHA	40	21	16	37	20	—	—	—	—	—
2003–04	University of Minnesota Duluth	WCHA	45	32	31	63	34	—	—	—	—	—
2004–05	Houston Aeros	AHL	71	11	11	22	25	5	1	0	1	0
2005–06	Dallas Stars	NHL	5	1	0	1	12	—	—	—	—	—
2005–06	Iowa Stars	AHL	66	26	32	58	30	7	3	4	7	4
2006–07	Dallas Stars	NHL	1	1	0	1	0	—	—	—	—	—
2006–07	Iowa Stars	AHL	65	27	25	52	32	12	4	5	9	4
2007–08	Dallas Stars	NHL	2	0	0	0	2	—	—	—	—	—
2007–08	Iowa Stars	AHL	36	10	11	21	15	—	—	—	—	—
2007–08	Tampa Bay Lightning	NHL	19	1	1	2	9	—	—	—	—	—
2007–08	Norfolk Admirals	AHL	19	6	9	15	4	—	—	—	—	—
2008–09	Chicago Wolves	AHL	41	6	5	11	10	—	—	—	—	—
2008–09	Bridgeport Sound Tigers	AHL	21	7	6	13	2	1	0	1	1	0
2009–10	Ilves	SM-l	4	0	1	1	2	—	—	—	—	—
2009–10	Thetford Mines Isothermic	LNAH	4	2	1	3	0	—	—	—	—	—
2009–10	Augsburger Panther	DEL	4	0	0	0	0	—	—	—	—	—
2010–11	Thetford Mines Isothermic	LNAH	4	0	3	3	2	—	—	—	—	—
2010–11	Idaho Steelheads	ECHL	22	10	10	20	16	—	—	—	—	—
2011–12	Thetford Mines Isothermic	LNAH	25	12	11	23	6	8	1	3	4	0
2012–13	Thetford Mines Isothermic	LNAH	2	0	1	1	0	—	—	—	—	—
2015–16	St-Joseph Justiciers	LHBBF	8	4	7	11	6	10	3	2	5	4
2016–17	St-Joseph Justiciers	LHBBF	11	1	9	10	6	4	0	2	2	2
AHL totals			319	93	99	192	118	25	8	10	18	8
NHL totals			27	3	1	4	23	—	—	—	—	—

Awards and achievements
Preceded by Peter Sejna	WCHA Player of the Year; 2003–04	Succeeded by Marty Sertich
Preceded by Peter Sejna	NCAA Ice Hockey Scoring Champion; 2003–04	Succeeded by Marty Sertich
Preceded by Peter Sejna	Winner of the Hobey Baker Award; 2003–04	Succeeded by Marty Sertich
