= MAAC Offensive Player of the Year =

- Sport: Ice hockey
- Awarded for: The Offensive Player of the Year in the Metro Atlantic Athletic Conference

History
- First award: 1999
- Final award: 2003
- Most recent: Brandon Doria

The MAAC Offensive Player of the Year was an annual award given out at the conclusion of the Metro Atlantic Athletic Conference regular season to the best offensive men's ice hockey player in the conference as voted by the coaches of each MAAC team.

The award was discontinued after 2002-03 when the MAAC ice hockey conference was dissolved and all remaining programs reformed in Atlantic Hockey.

== Award winners ==
Year	Winner	Position	School
1998–99	Ryan Carter	Forward	Iona
1999–00	Shawn Mansoff	Forward	Quinnipiac
2000-01	Ryan Manitowich	Forward	Iona
2001-02	Patrick Rissmiller	Left wing	Holy Cross
2002-03	Brandon Doria	Forward	Holy Cross

=== Winners by school ===
School	Winners
Holy Cross	2
Iona	2
Quinnipiac	1

=== Winners by position ===
Position	Winners
Left wing	1
Forward	4

== See also ==
- Atlantic Hockey Player of the Year
- MAAC Awards
