= Andrew Hutchinson (ice hockey) =

American ice hockey player (born 1980)

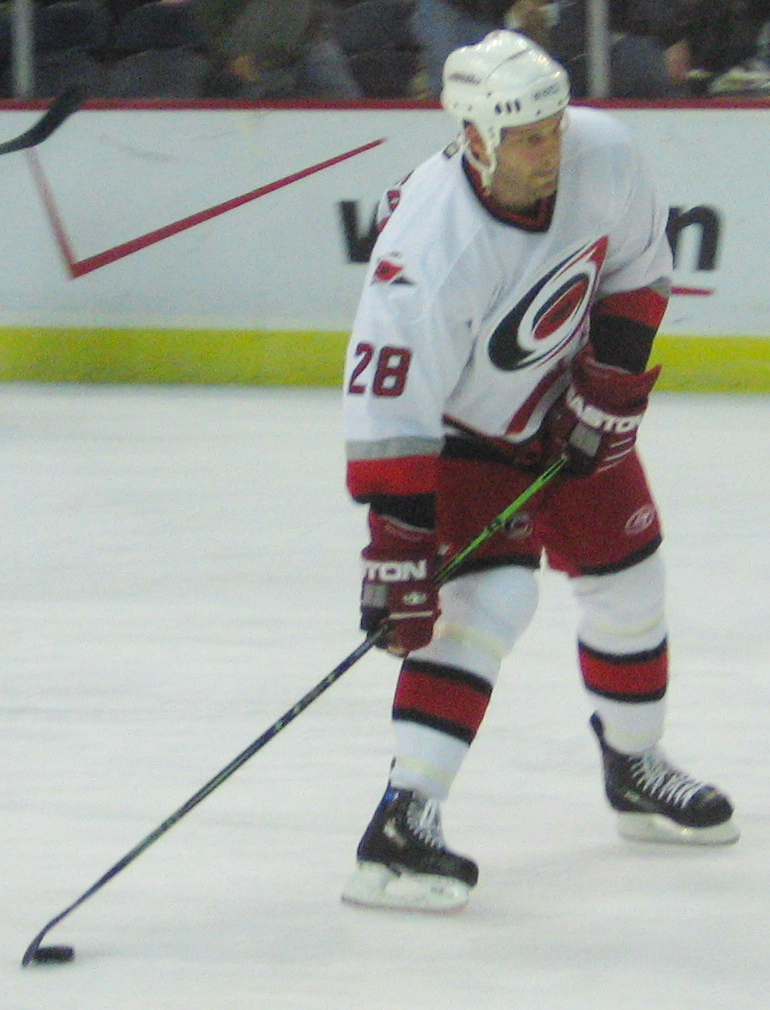
- Born: March 24, 1980 (age 46) Evanston, Illinois, U.S.
- Height: 6 ft 2 in (188 cm)
- Weight: 195 lb (88 kg; 13 st 13 lb)
- Position: Defense
- Shot: Right
- Played for: Nashville Predators; Carolina Hurricanes; Tampa Bay Lightning; Dallas Stars; Pittsburgh Penguins; Barys Astana; EV Zug; KHL Medveščak Zagreb
- National team: United States
- NHL draft: 54th overall, 1999; Nashville Predators
- Playing career: 2002–2015

Andrew Thomas Hutchinson (born March 24, 1980) is an American former professional ice hockey defenseman, who played in the National Hockey League (NHL).

== Playing career ==
As a youth, Hutchinson played in the 1994 Quebec International Pee-Wee Hockey Tournament with a minor ice hockey team from Fraser, Michigan.

Hutchinson was drafted 54th overall by the Nashville Predators in the 1999 NHL entry draft from the CCHA's, Michigan State University. After making his NHL debut with the Predators in the 2003–04 season, Hutchinson was traded by the Predators to the Carolina Hurricanes for a 3rd-round pick on July 25, 2005. Hutchinson won the Stanley Cup in 2006 playing with the Carolina Hurricanes appearing in 36 regular season games.

On July 17, 2007, Hutchinson was traded by the Hurricanes along with Joe Barnes and a 3rd round draft pick in 2008 to the New York Rangers in exchange for Matt Cullen. Although he never played a game for the Rangers, Andrew had a superb season in the AHL serving as the Hartford Wolfpack's captain. He led all AHL defensemen in point and assists and ranked third in goals. He was elected to the 2008 AHL First-Team All Star. On April 10, 2008, Hutchinson won the Eddie Shore Award as the AHL's top defenseman for the 2007–08 season.

On July 9, 2008, Hutchinson signed a two-year deal with the Tampa Bay Lightning. He started the 2008–09 season in the AHL playing for Norfolk Admirals. In 20 games Hutch tallied 1 goal and 13 assists with the Admirals. On November 27, 2008, Hutchinson was called up to the Lightning and played in only two games before he was dealt to the Dallas Stars for Lauri Tukonen on November 30, 2008.

On July 7, 2010, Hutchinson signed as a free agent to a one-year contract with the Pittsburgh Penguins. He was assigned to AHL affiliate, the Wilkes-Barre/Scranton Penguins for the majority of the 2010–11 season, however appeared as an injury recall in 5 games with the Penguins.

On June 30, 2011, on the eve of North American free agency, Hutchinson signed his first contract abroad, signing a one-year deal with Barys Astana of the Russian Kontinental Hockey League. In the 2011–12 season, Hutchinson became a fixture on the blueline of Astana, contributing with 15 points in 53 games. He was then signed to a one-year extension on May 1, 2012.

== Personal life ==
Andrew is married to Andrea and has 2 children; son Cole and daughter Avery.

== Career statistics ==
=== Regular season and playoffs ===
			Regular season					Playoffs
Season	Team	League	GP	G	A	Pts	PIM	GP	G	A	Pts	PIM
1996–97	Little Caesars 18U	AAA	82	15	41	56		—	—	—	—	—
1997–98	U.S. NTDP Juniors	USHL	15	0	7	7	8	—	—	—	—	—
1997–98	U.S. NTDP U18	NAHL	12	2	0	2	8	5	2	3	5	2
1997–98	U.S. NTDP U18	USDP	27	3	11	14	35	—	—	—	—	—
1998–99	Michigan State University	CCHA	37	3	12	15	26	—	—	—	—	—
1999–2000	Michigan State University	CCHA	42	5	12	17	64	—	—	—	—	—
2000–01	Michigan State University	CCHA	42	5	19	24	46	—	—	—	—	—
2001–02	Michigan State University	CCHA	39	6	16	22	24	—	—	—	—	—
2001–02	Milwaukee Admirals	AHL	5	0	1	1	0	—	—	—	—	—
2002–03	Toledo Storm	ECHL	10	2	5	7	4	—	—	—	—	—
2002–03	Milwaukee Admirals	AHL	63	9	17	26	40	3	1	0	1	0
2003–04	Milwaukee Admirals	AHL	46	12	12	24	39	22	5	11	16	33
2003–04	Nashville Predators	NHL	18	4	4	8	4	—	—	—	—	—
2004–05	Milwaukee Admirals	AHL	76	10	35	45	79	7	1	3	4	8
2005–06	Carolina Hurricanes	NHL	36	3	8	11	18	—	—	—	—	—
2006–07	Carolina Hurricanes	NHL	41	3	11	14	30	—	—	—	—	—
2007–08	Hartford Wolf Pack	AHL	67	18	46	64	66	5	2	2	4	4
2008–09	Norfolk Admirals	AHL	20	1	12	13	14	—	—	—	—	—
2008–09	Tampa Bay Lightning	NHL	2	0	0	0	0	—	—	—	—	—
2008–09	Dallas Stars	NHL	38	2	3	5	12	—	—	—	—	—
2009–10	Texas Stars	AHL	78	9	29	38	50	21	5	11	16	14
2010–11	Wilkes–Barre/Scranton Penguins	AHL	54	7	29	36	29	12	0	5	5	0
2010–11	Pittsburgh Penguins	NHL	5	0	1	1	6	—	—	—	—	—
2011–12	Barys Astana	KHL	53	3	12	15	40	7	3	3	6	10
2012–13	Barys Astana	KHL	40	2	12	14	22	7	0	0	0	10
2013–14	EV Zug	NLA	33	4	11	15	22	—	—	—	—	—
2014–15	KHL Medveščak Zagreb	KHL	53	4	11	15	75	—	—	—	—	—
AHL totals			409	66	181	247	317	70	14	32	46	59
NHL totals			140	12	27	39	70	—	—	—	—	—
KHL totals			146	9	35	44	137	14	3	3	6	20

=== International ===
Year	Team	Event	GP	G	A	Pts	PIM
2007	United States	WC	7	3	1	4	2

== Awards and honors ==
Award	Year
CCHA All-Tournament Team	2000, 2001
All-CCHA Second Team	2000-01; 2001-02
CCHA Best Defensive Defenseman	2000-01
AHCA West Second-Team All-American	2001–02
Calder Cup Milwaukee Admirals	2003–04
Stanley Cup Carolina Hurricanes	2005–06
AHL First All-Star Team	2007–08
AHL Eddie Shore Award	2007–08

Awards and achievements
Preceded by Mike Weaver	CCHA Best Defensive Defenseman; 2000-01	Succeeded by Mike Komisarek
