= Peter Sejna =

Slovak ice hockey player

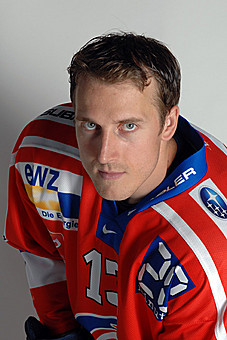
- Born: 5 October 1979 (age 46) Liptovský Mikuláš, Czechoslovakia
- Height: 5 ft 10 in (178 cm)
- Weight: 183 lb (83 kg; 13 st 1 lb)
- Position: Left wing
- Shot: Left
- Played for: St. Louis Blues; ZSC Lions; HC Davos; SC Rapperswil-Jona Lakers; HC La Chaux-de-Fonds
- National team: Slovakia
- NHL draft: Undrafted
- Playing career: 2003–2015

Peter Sejna (born 5 October 1979) is a Slovak former professional ice hockey center.

== Biography ==
Sejna was born in Liptovský Mikuláš, Czechoslovakia. As a youth, he played in the 1993 Quebec International Pee-Wee Hockey Tournament with a team from Poprad. Sejna attended Colorado College, and in 2003 won the coveted Hobey Baker Award, given annually to the most outstanding collegiate hockey player. Sejna also won the bronze medal with the Slovak national ice hockey team in the 2003 Ice Hockey World Championship.

== Career statistics ==
=== Regular season and playoffs ===
			Regular season					Playoffs
Season	Team	League	GP	G	A	Pts	PIM	GP	G	A	Pts	PIM
1996–97	HK 32 Liptovský Mikuláš	SVK U20	40	32	19	51	6	—	—	—	—	—
1997–98	HK 32 Liptovský Mikuláš	SVK U20	17	14	10	24	8	—	—	—	—	—
1997–98	HK 32 Liptovský Mikuláš	SVK	34	5	6	11	6	—	—	—	—	—
1998–99	Des Moines Buccaneers	USHL	52	40	23	63	26	14	11	6	17	8
1999–2000	Des Moines Buccaneers	USHL	58	41	53	94	36	9	4	5	9	4
2000–01	Colorado College	WCHA	41	29	29	58	10	—	—	—	—	—
2001–02	Colorado College	WCHA	43	26	24	50	16	—	—	—	—	—
2002–03	Colorado College	WCHA	42	36	46	82	12	—	—	—	—	—
2002–03	St. Louis Blues	NHL	1	1	0	1	0	—	—	—	—	—
2003–04	St. Louis Blues	NHL	20	2	2	4	4	—	—	—	—	—
2003–04	Worcester IceCats	AHL	59	12	29	41	13	10	3	3	6	10
2004–05	Worcester IceCats	AHL	64	17	21	38	24	—	—	—	—	—
2005–06	Peoria Rivermen	AHL	44	19	31	50	18	4	3	0	3	2
2005–06	St. Louis Blues	NHL	6	1	1	2	4	—	—	—	—	—
2006–07	Peoria Rivermen	AHL	39	12	24	36	12	—	—	—	—	—
2006–07	St. Louis Blues	NHL	22	3	1	4	4	—	—	—	—	—
2007–08	ZSC Lions	NLA	38	15	21	36	4	17	7	6	13	2
2008–09	ZSC Lions	NLA	41	16	26	42	28	3	0	1	1	0
2009–10	ZSC Lions	NLA	38	17	17	34	2	—	—	—	—	—
2010–11	HC Davos	NLA	15	5	3	8	2	7	1	5	6	2
2011–12	HC Davos	NLA	49	19	16	35	6	4	0	0	0	0
2012–13	Rapperswil–Jona Lakers	NLA	47	20	14	34	22	—	—	—	—	—
2013–14	Rapperswil–Jona Lakers	NLA	48	11	9	20	18	—	—	—	—	—
2014–15	HC La Chaux–de–Fonds	SUI.2	27	10	15	25	2	7	3	7	10	0
NHL totals			49	7	4	11	12	—	—	—	—	—
AHL totals			206	60	105	165	67	14	6	3	9	12
NLA totals			276	103	106	209	82	31	8	12	20	4

=== International ===
Peter Sejna
Medal record

Representing Slovakia

Ice hockey

World Championships
Bronze medal – third place	2003 Helsinki	

World Junior Championships
Bronze medal – third place	1999 Winnipeg	

Year	Team	Event	GP	G	A	Pts	PIM
1997	Slovakia	EJC	6	3	3	6	0
1999	Slovakia	WJC	6	1	2	3	0
2003	Slovakia	WC	4	0	0	0	4
Junior totals			12	4	5	9	0
Senior totals			4	0	0	0	4

== Awards and honors ==
Award	Year
All-WCHA Rookie Team	2000–01
All-WCHA Third Team	2000–01; 2001–02
All-WCHA First Team	2002–03
AHCA West First-Team All-American	2002–03
Hobey Baker Award	2002–03

Awards and achievements
Preceded by Dany Heatley	WCHA Rookie of the Year; 2000–01	Succeeded by Brandon Bochenski
Preceded by Mark Hartigan	WCHA Player of the Year; 2002–03	Succeeded by Junior Lessard
Preceded by John Pohl	NCAA Ice Hockey Scoring Champion; 2002–03	Succeeded by Junior Lessard
Preceded by Jordan Leopold	Winner of the Hobey Baker Award; 2002–03	Succeeded by Junior Lessard
