= Gregg Johnson =

American ice hockey player (born 1982)

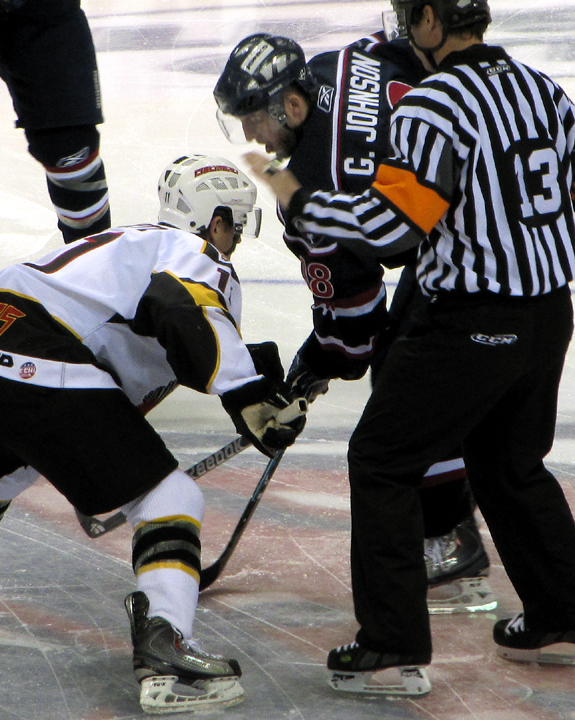
- Born: June 18, 1982 (age 42); Windsor, Connecticut, U.S.
- Height: 6 ft 0 in (183 cm)
- Weight: 185 lb (84 kg; 13 st 3 lb)
- Position: Forward
- Shot: Left
- Played for: Binghamton Senators; Norfolk Admirals; Bridgeport Sound Tigers; SaiPa; Frankfurt Lions; Grizzly Adams Wolfsburg
- National team: United States
- NHL draft: 256th overall, 2001; Ottawa Senators
- Playing career: 2004–2010

Gregg Johnson (born June 18, 1982) is an American former professional ice hockey forward.

== Playing career ==
Johnson's amateur career began in the Eastern Junior Hockey League, where he skated with the New England Jr. Coyotes from 1997 to 2000, earning 202 points in combined goals and assists. The Jr. Coyotes won the Gary Dineen Cup twice during Johnson's tenure there, once in 1998 and again in 2000.

Johnson played college hockey at Boston University from 2000 to 2004, scoring a combined 47 points in goals and assists during regular season play.

In 2001, Johnson was picked by the Ottawa Senators in the eighth round of the NHL draft. He elected to remain at Boston University, and would not join the Senators organization until 2003, when he moved to their AHL affiliate, the Binghamton Senators.

Johnson skated with the Binghamton Senators from 2003 to 2006, earning 49 points in combined goals and assists during regular season play. Johnson spent the majority of the 2004–05 season with the Pee Dee Pride, the Senators' ECHL affiliate, where he scored 63 points in goals and assists during the regular season.

Johnson split the 2006–07 season between the Trenton Titans (ECHL), where he scored 31 points in goals and assists during 26 games; the Bridgeport Sound Tigers (AHL), scoring 13 points in 35 games; and the Norfolk Admirals (AHL), where he scored 3 points in 11 games.

In 2007, Johnson left the AHL after only 12 games with the Bridgeport Sound Tigers. He moved to Europe, where he played 9 games with SaiPa of SM-liiga and 7 games with the Frankfurt Lions of the DEL. Johnson then signed with Frankfurt's league rivals, the Grizzly Adams Wolfsburg for the 2008–09 season, where he scored 7 points in the regular season and 3 points during post-season play.

Johnson returned to the ECHL in 2009, joining the South Carolina Stingrays' roster. In January 2010, Johnson was selected to represent the Stingrays as an alternate captain for all road games.

Johnson did not return to the Stingrays for the 2010–11 season and eventually retired.

== Awards ==
- Named EJHL Rookie of the Year in 1998
- Named EJHL MVP in 2000

== Career statistics ==
=== Regular season and playoffs ===
			Regular season					Playoffs
Season	Team	League	GP	G	A	Pts	PIM	GP	G	A	Pts	PIM
1997–98	New England Jr. Coyotes	EJHL	40	13	24	37		—	—	—	—	—
1998–99	New England Jr. Coyotes	EJHL	40	29	27	56		—	—	—	—	—
1999–2000	New England Jr. Coyotes	EJHL	40	40	69	109		—	—	—	—	—
2000–01	Boston University	HE	35	5	5	10	20	—	—	—	—	—
2001–02	Boston University	HE	33	5	18	23	34	—	—	—	—	—
2002–03	Boston University	HE	24	1	4	5	18	—	—	—	—	—
2003–04	Boston University	HE	33	3	6	9	38	—	—	—	—	—
2003–04	Binghamton Senators	AHL	5	1	0	1	4	1	0	0	0	0
2004–05	Pee Dee Pride	ECHL	70	27	36	63	46	—	—	—	—	—
2004–05	Binghamton Senators	AHL	4	0	0	0	0	—	—	—	—	—
2005–06	Binghamton Senators	AHL	79	7	22	29	45	—	—	—	—	—
2006–07	Trenton Titans	ECHL	26	12	19	31	8	—	—	—	—	—
2006–07	Norfolk Admirals	AHL	11	1	2	3	0	—	—	—	—	—
2006–07	Bridgeport Sound Tigers	AHL	35	6	7	13	12	—	—	—	—	—
2007–08	Bridgeport Sound Tigers	AHL	12	1	1	2	6	—	—	—	—	—
2007–08	SaiPa	SM-liiga	9	1	0	1	2	—	—	—	—	—
2007–08	Frankfurt Lions	DEL	7	1	2	3	2	8	0	3	3	0
2008–09	Grizzly Adams Wolfsburg	DEL	34	4	3	7	26	10	1	2	3	2
2009–10	South Carolina Stingrays	ECHL	70	21	40	61	50	5	1	1	2	6
AHL totals			146	16	32	48	67	1	0	0	0	0
ECHL totals			166	60	95	155	104	5	1	1	2	6

=== International ===
Year	Team	Event	GP	G	A	Pts	PIM
2002	United States	WJC	7	1	0	1	2
Junior totals			7	1	0	1	2
