= Ryan Manitowich =

Canadian ice hockey player

- Born: July 5, 1978 (age 47) Calgary, Alberta, Canada
- Height: 6 ft 0 in (183 cm)
- Weight: 185 lb (84 kg; 13 st 3 lb)
- Position: Forward
- Played for: CHL; Bossier-Shreveport Mudbugs
- NHL draft: Undrafted
- Playing career: 2003–2006

Ryan Manitowich (born July 5, 1978) is a Canadian former professional ice hockey player. He won 2009 Allan Cup with the Bentley Generals and won the 2010 Allan Cup with the Fort St. John Flyers.

Manitowich attended Iona College in New Rochelle, New York, where he played four seasons (1999–2003) of NCAA Division I hockey with the Iona Gaels. Manitowich went on to play three seasons of professional hockey with the Bossier-Shreveport Mudbugs of the Central Hockey League (CHL), concluding his CHL career with the 2005–06 season having played a total of 164 regular season games and another 39 playoff games, all with the Mudbugs.

Manitowich continued to play Canadian senior hockey, twice winning the Canadian national championship and the Allan Cup; first in 2009 with the Bentley Generals, and again in 2010 with the Fort St. John Flyers.

== Awards and honours ==
Award	Year
All-MAAC First Team	2000-01

Awards and achievements
Preceded by Shawn Mansoff	MAAC Offensive Player of the Year; 2000-01	Succeeded by Pat Rissmiller
