= 2000–01 NCAA Division I men's ice hockey rankings =

- NCAA tournament: 2001
- NCAA champion: Boston College
- Preseason No. 1 (USA Today): North Dakota
- Preseason No. 1 (USCHO): North Dakota
- NCAA Division I men's ice hockey rankings

Two human polls made up the 2000–01 NCAA Division I men's ice hockey rankings, the USCHO.com Division I Men's Poll and the USA TODAY/American Hockey Magazine Poll. As the 2000–01 season progressed, rankings were updated weekly. There were a total of 18 voters in the USA Today poll and 40 voters in the USCHO.com poll. Each first place vote in the USA Today poll is worth 15 points in the rankings while in the USCHO.com poll every first place preseason vote is worth 20 points and all other first place votes are worth 15 points with every subsequent vote worth 1 fewer point.

== Legend ==
	Increase in ranking
	Decrease in ranking
	Not ranked previous week
(Italics)	Number of first place votes
#–#–#	Win–loss–tie record
†	Tied with team above or below also with this symbol

== USA TODAY/American Hockey Magazine Poll ==
	Preseason Oct 2	Week 1 Oct 9	Week 2 Oct 16	Week 3 Oct 23	Week 4 Oct 30	Week 5 Nov 6	Week 6 Nov 13	Week 7 Nov 20	Week 8 Nov 27	Week 9 Dec 5	Week 10 Dec 11	Week 11 Dec 18	Week 12 Jan 2	Week 13 Jan 9	Week 14 Jan 15	Week 15 Jan 22	Week 16 Jan 29	Week 17 Feb 5	Week 18 Feb 12	Week 19 Feb 19	Week 20 Feb 26	Week 21 Mar 5	Week 22 Mar 12	Week 23 Mar 19	Final Apr 7	
1	North Dakota (12)	North Dakota (8) 0–0–2	North Dakota (11) 1–0–3	Wisconsin (7) 6–0–0	Michigan (5) 6–0–2	Boston College (10) 7–1–0	Michigan State (10) 5–1–1	Minnesota (9) 9–1–2	Michigan State (14) 10–1–2	Michigan State (14) 11–1–3	Michigan State (14) 12–1–4	Michigan State (16) 12–1–4	Michigan State (17) 14–1–4	Michigan State (18) 16–1–4	Michigan State (18) 18–1–4	Michigan State (18) 20–1–4	Michigan State (16) 21–2–4	Michigan State † (10) 22–3–4	Michigan State (18) 24–3–4	Michigan State (15) 25–4–4	Michigan State (18) 27–4–4	Michigan State (18) 28–4–4	Michigan State (18) 30–4–4	Michigan State (18) 32–4–4	Boston College (18) 33–8–2	1
2	Michigan (4)	Wisconsin (4) 2–0–0	Wisconsin (3) 4–0–0	Boston College (4) 4–0–0	Wisconsin (6) 7–1–0	Minnesota (7) 7–0–1	Boston College (6) 8–2–0	Michigan State (6) 7–1–2	North Dakota (3) 10–2–4	North Dakota (4) 12–2–4	Boston College (4) 12–3–1	Boston College; 12–3–1	Boston College (1) 13–4–1	North Dakota; 14–4–4	Boston College; 15–5–1	Boston College; 17–6–1	Boston College; 19–6–1	Boston College †; 20–6–1	Boston College; 21–7–1	Boston College; 23–8–1	Boston College; 24–8–2	Boston College; 26–8–2	Boston College; 28–8–2	Boston College; 30–8–2	North Dakota; 29–8–9	2
3	Wisconsin (2)	New Hampshire (4) 1–0–1	Boston College (2) 2–0–0	New Hampshire (7) 4–0–1	Boston College (3) 5–1–0	Michigan (1) 6–1–2	North Dakota (1) 6–2–4	Boston College; 9–3–0	Boston College (1) 11–3–0	Boston College; 11–3–0	North Dakota; 13–3–4	North Dakota (1) 13–3–4	North Dakota; 14–4–4	Colorado College; 15–4–1	North Dakota; 15–5–4	St. Cloud State; 19–4–1	North Dakota; 18–5–5	North Dakota; 20–5–5	North Dakota; 20–5–7	North Dakota (1) 21–5–8	North Dakota; 22–5–9	North Dakota; 24–5–9	North Dakota; 26–6–9	St. Cloud State; 31–8–1	Michigan State; 33–5–4	3
4	Michigan State	Boston College † (2) 0–0–0	New Hampshire (1) 2–0–1	Michigan; 4–0–2	New Hampshire (4) 5–0–1	Michigan State; 5–1–1	Michigan; 7–2–2	North Dakota (3) 8–2–4	Michigan; 10–3–2	Michigan; 11–3–3	Michigan; 13–3–3	Michigan (1) 13–3–3	Colorado College; 13–4–1	Boston College; 14–5–1	St. Cloud State; 17–4–1	North Dakota; 16–5–5	Colorado College; 19–5–1	Colorado College; 20–6–1	Minnesota; 22–7–2	Minnesota (2) 24–7–2	Minnesota; 25–8–2	St. Cloud State; 27–8–1	St. Cloud State; 29–8–1	North Dakota; 27–7–9	Michigan; 27–13–5	4
5	Boston College	Michigan †; 0–0–2	Michigan; 2–0–2	North Dakota (1) 2–1–3	Minnesota; 5–0–1	Colorado College; 6–0–0	St. Cloud State; 6–1–1	New Hampshire; 8–3–1	New Hampshire; 10–3–1	New Hampshire; 10–3–3	New Hampshire; 10–3–3	New Hampshire; 12–3–3	Western Michigan; 14–3–2	Western Michigan; 16–3–2	New Hampshire; 15–4–5	Colorado College; 17–5–1	Michigan; 19–6–4	Michigan; 20–7–4	Michigan; 21–8–4	Michigan; 21–9–5	St. Cloud State; 25–8–1	Minnesota; 25–10–2	Minnesota; 27–10–2	Michigan; 25–12–5	St. Cloud State; 31–9–1	5
6	New Hampshire	Boston University; 0–0–0	Minnesota; 2–0–0	Minnesota; 4–0–0	Michigan State; 4–1–1	Wisconsin; 7–3–0	Minnesota; 7–1–2	Western Michigan; 8–1–2	Western Michigan; 10–1–2	Western Michigan; 11–2–2	Western Michigan; 11–2–2	Colorado College; 11–4–1	New Hampshire; 13–4–3	New Hampshire †; 14–4–4	Colorado College; 15–5–1	Michigan; 17–6–4	St. Cloud State; 19–6–1	Minnesota; 20–7–2	St. Cloud State; 22–7–1	St. Cloud State; 23–8–1	Michigan; 21–10–5	Michigan; 22–11–5	Michigan; 24–11–5	Colorado College; 26–12–1	Colorado College; 27–13–1	6
7	Boston University	Michigan State; 0–0–0	Michigan State; 1–0–1	Maine; 1–1–1	Colorado College; 4–0–0	North Dakota; 5–2–3	Western Michigan; 8–1–1	Michigan; 8–3–2	Minnesota; 9–3–2	Colorado College; 10–3–1	Colorado College; 11–4–1	St. Cloud State; 13–4–1	Michigan; 13–5–3	St. Cloud State †; 15–4–1	Western Michigan; 16–4–3	New Hampshire; 16–5–5	Minnesota; 18–7–2	St. Cloud State; 20–7–1	Colorado College; 20–7–1	New Hampshire; 19–9–6	New Hampshire; 19–9–6	New Hampshire; 20–10–6	Colorado College; 24–11–1	Minnesota; 27–12–2	Maine; 20–12–7	7
8	St. Lawrence	St. Lawrence; 0–0–0	Maine; 0–1–1	St. Cloud State; 3–0–1	North Dakota; 3–2–3	New Hampshire; 5–2–1	New Hampshire; 6–3–1	Colorado College; 7–3–0	Providence; 7–2–3	St. Cloud State; 10–3–1	St. Cloud State; 11–4–1	Western Michigan; 12–3–2	St. Cloud State; 13–4–1	Michigan; 15–5–3	Michigan; 16–6–3	Western Michigan; 16–5–4	New Hampshire; 16–7–5	Providence; 15–7–4	New Hampshire; 18–8–6	Providence; 17–8–5	Providence; 19–8–5	Colorado College; 22–11–1	Maine; 19–10–7	Providence; 22–12–5	Wisconsin; 22–15–4	8
9	Maine	Minnesota; 1–0–0	St. Cloud State; 1–0–1	Michigan State; 2–1–1	Maine; 2–2–1	St. Cloud State; 4–1–1	Colorado College; 6–2–0	Providence; 7–2–1	St. Cloud State; 8–3–1	Providence; 8–3–3	Minnesota; 10–5–2	Minnesota; 10–5–2	Minnesota; 12–5–2	Minnesota; 13–6–2	Minnesota; 15–6–2	Minnesota; 16–7–2	Western Michigan; 16–6–5	New Hampshire; 16–8–6	Providence; 16–8–4	Colorado College; 20–9–1	Colorado College; 21–10–1	Clarkson; 20–9–3	Providence; 21–11–5	Maine; 19–11–7	Minnesota; 27–13–2	9
10	St. Cloud State	Maine; 0–0–0	Boston University; 0–1–0	Colorado College; 2–0–0	St. Cloud State; 4–1–1	Boston University; 2–2–1	Maine; 3–3–2	St. Cloud State; 6–3–1	Colorado College; 8–3–1	Maine; 6–4–4	Providence; 8–4–3	Providence; 8–4–3	Wisconsin; 13–9–0	Providence; 11–5–3	Providence; 13–5–3	Providence; 13–7–3	Providence; 13–7–4	Cornell; 11–6–4	Wisconsin; 15–11–4	Wisconsin; 16–12–4	Clarkson; 18–9–3	Maine; 17–10–7	Wisconsin; 21–13–4	St. Lawrence; 20–12–4	St. Lawrence; 20–13–4	10
11	Cornell	Colgate; 0–1–1	Colorado College; 2–0–0	Boston University; 1–1–0	Boston University; 1–1–1	Maine; 2–3–2	Northeastern; 5–2–1	Maine; 4–3–2	Union; 6–1–1	Minnesota; 9–5–2	Rensselaer; 8–3–1	Rensselaer; 8–3–1	Providence; 9–5–3	Wisconsin; 13–10–1	Denver; 12–9–3	Maine; 10–7–6	Denver; 14–10–3	Maine; 11–9–6	Maine; 13–9–6	Maine †; 14–10–6	Wisconsin; 17–13–4	Providence; 19–10–5	Nebraska-Omaha; 24–14–3	Wisconsin; 21–14–4	Providence; 22–13–5	11
12	Minnesota	St. Cloud State; 0–0–0	Colgate; 1–1–1	Nebraska-Omaha; 2–2–0	Nebraska-Omaha; 4–2–0	Northern Michigan; 5–1–3	Wisconsin; 7–5–0	Wisconsin; 7–5–0	Northern Michigan; 7–4–4	Union; 6–2–2	Wisconsin; 10–8–0	Northern Michigan; 9–5–5	Rensselaer; 9–4–1	Rensselaer; 10–5–1	Maine; 10–7–6	Denver; 12–10–3	Wisconsin; 14–11–1	Western Michigan †; 16–8–5	Western Michigan; 16–9–6	Clarkson †; 16–9–3	Nebraska-Omaha; 20–13–3	Wisconsin; 19–13–4	New Hampshire; 21–12–6	Nebraska-Omaha; 24–15–3	Mercyhurst; 22–12–2	12
13	Lake Superior State	Cornell; 0–0–0	St. Lawrence; 0–1–0	Cornell; 0–0–0	Northeastern; 4–1–0	Western Michigan; 6–1–1	Providence; 5–2–1	Union; 5–1–0	Harvard; 4–2–1	Wisconsin; 9–7–0	Northern Michigan; 9–5–5	Ohio State; 10–5–1	Vermont; 9–4–0	Harvard; 8–7–1	Rensselaer; 11–6–1	Wisconsin; 14–11–1	Cornell; 9–6–4	Clarkson †; 13–8–3	Clarkson; 14–9–3	Western Michigan; 17–9–6	St. Lawrence; 16–10–4	Nebraska-Omaha; 22–13–3	Clarkson; 21–11–3	New Hampshire; 21–12–6	Nebraska-Omaha; 24–15–3	13
14	Nebraska-Omaha	Nebraska-Omaha; 0–0–0	Cornell; 0–0–0	Colgate; 1–1–2	Providence; 2–0–1	Northeastern; 4–2–1	Union; 5–1–0	Vermont; 4–2–0	Maine; 5–4–3	Harvard; 5–3–1	Harvard; 6–4–1	Wisconsin; 11–9–0	Denver; 11–7–2	Maine; 10–6–5	Wisconsin; 13–10–1	Nebraska-Omaha; 15–10–1	Nebraska-Omaha; 15–11–2	Minnesota State-Mankato; 17–10–1	Nebraska-Omaha; 17–12–3	St. Lawrence; 14–10–4	Maine; 15–10–7	Miami; 20–14–2	St. Lawrence; 18–12–4	Clarkson; 21–11–3	New Hampshire; 21–12–6	14
15	Colorado College	Colorado College; 0–0–0	Nebraska-Omaha; 1–1–0	St. Lawrence †; 1–2–0	Cornell; 0–0–0	Providence; 4–1–1	Yale; 3–1–0	Yale; 4–2–0	Yale; 5–3–0	Northern Michigan; 7–5–5	Vermont; 7–4–0	Cornell; 5–3–2	Maine; 9–6–4	Northern Michigan; 10–5–6	Harvard; 9–8–1	Cornell; 8–5–4	Clarkson †; 11–7–3	Wisconsin; 15–11–2	St. Lawrence; 13–9–4	Nebraska-Omaha; 18–13–3	Western Michigan; 18–10–6	Denver; 19–13–4	Northern Michigan; 18–12–7	Cornell; 16–12–5	Clarkson; 21–11–3	15
16				Providence †; 2–0–0													St. Lawrence †; 9–8–4									16
17																	Miami †; 13–11–2									17
	Preseason Oct 2	Week 1 Oct 9	Week 2 Oct 16	Week 3 Oct 23	Week 4 Oct 30	Week 5 Nov 6	Week 6 Nov 13	Week 7 Nov 20	Week 8 Nov 27	Week 9 Dec 5	Week 10 Dec 11	Week 11 Dec 18	Week 12 Jan 2	Week 13 Jan 9	Week 14 Jan 15	Week 15 Jan 22	Week 16 Jan 29	Week 17 Feb 5	Week 18 Feb 12	Week 19 Feb 19	Week 20 Feb 26	Week 21 Mar 5	Week 22 Mar 12	Week 23 Mar 19	Final Apr 7	
		Dropped: Lake Superior State; 1–0–0	Dropped: None	Dropped: None	Dropped: St. Lawrence; 1–2–0; Colgate; 1–1–2	Dropped: Cornell; 0–1–0; Nebraska-Omaha; 4–4–0	Dropped: Boston University; 2–4–1; Northern Michigan; 5–3–3	Dropped: Northeastern; 5–4–1	Dropped: Wisconsin; 7–7–0; Vermont; 4–4–0	Dropped: Yale; 5–5–0	Dropped: Maine; 6–6–4; Union; 6–4–2	Dropped: Harvard; 6–5–1; Vermont; 7–4–0	Dropped: Northern Michigan; 9–5–5; Ohio State; 10–7–1; Cornell; 6–4–2	Dropped: Vermont; 6–5–1; Denver; 7–4–0	Dropped: Northern Michigan; 11–5–7	Dropped: Rensselaer; 11–8–1; Harvard; 9–8–1	Dropped: Maine; 10–9–6	Dropped: Denver; 14–12–3; Nebraska-Omaha; 16–12–2; St. Lawrence; 11–9–4; Miami; 15–11–2	Dropped: Minnesota State-Mankato; 17–12–1; Cornell; 11–8–4	Dropped: None	Dropped: None	Dropped: St. Lawrence; 16–12–4; Western Michigan; 18–12–6	Dropped: Miami; 20–16–2; Denver; 19–15–4	Dropped: Northern Michigan; 18–13–7	Dropped: Cornell; 16–12–5	

== USCHO.com Division I Men's Poll ==
	Preseason Oct 2	Week 1 Oct 16	Week 2 Oct 23	Week 3 Oct 30	Week 4 Nov 6	Week 5 Nov 13	Week 6 Nov 20	Week 7 Nov 27	Week 8 Dec 4	Week 9 Dec 11	Week 10 Dec 18	Week 11 Jan 2	Week 12 Jan 8	Week 13 Jan 15	Week 14 Jan 22	Week 15 Jan 29	Week 16 Feb 5	Week 17 Feb 12	Week 18 Feb 19	Week 19 Feb 26	Week 20 Mar 5	Week 21 Mar 12	Week 22 Mar 19	
1	North Dakota (24)	North Dakota (22) 1–0–3	Wisconsin (31) 6–0–0	Michigan (16) 6–0–2	Minnesota (21) 7–0–1	Michigan State (28) 7–1–1	Michigan State (20) 7–1–2	Michigan State (38) 10–1–2	Michigan State (30) 11–1–3	Michigan State (37) 12–1–4	Michigan State (38) 12–1–4	Michigan State (39) 14–1–4	Michigan State (40) 16–1–4	Michigan State (40) 18–1–4	Michigan State (40) 20–1–4	Michigan State (34) 21–2–4	Michigan State (28) 22–3–4	Michigan State (40) 24–3–4	Michigan State (32) 25–4–4	Michigan State (38) 27–4–4	Michigan State (39) 28–4–4	Michigan State (40) 30–4–4	Michigan State (40) 32–4–4	1
2	Michigan (7)	Wisconsin (12) 4–0–0	Boston College (5) 4–0–0	Wisconsin (16) 7–1–0	Boston College (17) 7–1–0	Boston College (7) 8–2–0	Minnesota (18) 9–1–2	North Dakota (2) 10–2–4	North Dakota (10) 12–2–4	Boston College (1) 12–3–1	Boston College; 12–3–1	Boston College (1) 13–4–1	North Dakota; 14–4–4	Boston College; 15–5–1	Boston College; 17–6–1	Boston College (3) 19–6–1	Boston College (9) 20–6–1	Boston College; 21–7–1	Boston College (2) 23–8–1	North Dakota (1) 22–5–9	Boston College (1) 26–8–2	Boston College; 28–8–2	Boston College; 30–8–2	2
3	Wisconsin (6)	Boston College (3) 2–0–0	Michigan (3) 4–0–2	New Hampshire (6) 5–0–1	Michigan; 6–1–2	Minnesota (5) 7–1–2	North Dakota (2) 8–2–4	Boston College; 11–3–0	Boston College; 11–3–0	North Dakota (2) 13–3–4	North Dakota (2) 13–3–4	North Dakota; 14–4–4	Boston College; 14–5–1	North Dakota; 15–5–4	North Dakota; 16–5–5	North Dakota (3) 18–5–5	North Dakota (3) 20–5–5	North Dakota; 20–5–7	North Dakota (4) 21–5–8	Boston College (1) 24–8–2	North Dakota; 24–5–9	St. Cloud State; 29–8–1	St. Cloud State; 31–8–1	3
4	Boston College (3)	Michigan (3) 2–0–2	New Hampshire; 4–0–1	Boston College (2) 5–1–0	Michigan State (1) 5–1–1	North Dakota; 6–2–4	Boston College; 9–3–0	New Hampshire; 10–3–1	Michigan; 11–3–3	Michigan; 13–3–3	Michigan; 13–3–3	Colorado College; 13–4–1	Colorado College; 15–4–1	St. Cloud State; 17–4–1	St. Cloud State; 19–4–1	Colorado College; 19–5–1	Colorado College; 20–6–1	Minnesota; 22–7–2	Minnesota (1) 24–7–2	Minnesota; 25–8–2	St. Cloud State; 27–8–1	North Dakota; 26–6–9	North Dakota; 27–7–9	4
5	Michigan State (1)	New Hampshire; 2–0–1	North Dakota (1) 2–1–3	Minnesota; 5–0–1	Colorado College (1) 6–0–0	Michigan; 7–2–2	New Hampshire; 8–3–1	Michigan; 10–3–2	New Hampshire; 10–3–3	New Hampshire; 10–3–3	New Hampshire; 12–3–3	Western Michigan; 14–3–2	Western Michigan; 16–3–2	New Hampshire; 15–4–5	Colorado College; 17–5–1	Michigan; 19–6–4	Michigan; 20–7–4	Michigan; 21–8–4	Michigan; 21–9–5	St. Cloud State; 25–8–1	Minnesota; 25–10–2	Minnesota; 27–10–2	Michigan; 25–12–5	5
6	St. Lawrence (1)	Michigan State; 1–0–1	Minnesota; 4–0–0	Michigan State; 4–1–1	Wisconsin; 7–3–0	St. Cloud State; 6–1–1	Western Michigan; 8–1–2	Western Michigan; 10–1–2	Western Michigan; 11–2–2	Western Michigan; 11–2–2	Colorado College; 11–4–1	New Hampshire; 13–4–3	New Hampshire; 14–4–4	Colorado College; 16–5–1	New Hampshire; 16–5–5	St. Cloud State; 19–6–1	Minnesota; 20–7–2	Colorado College; 20–7–1	St. Cloud State; 23–8–1	Michigan; 22–10–5	Michigan; 22–11–5	Michigan; 24–11–5	Colorado College; 26–12–1	6
7	Boston University	Minnesota; 2–0–0	Maine; 1–1–1	North Dakota; 3–2–3	North Dakota; 5–2–3	Colorado College; 6–2–0	Michigan; 8–3–2	Minnesota; 9–3–2	Colorado College; 10–3–1	Colorado College; 11–4–1	Western Michigan; 12–3–2	St. Cloud State; 13–4–1	St. Cloud State; 15–4–1	Western Michigan; 16–4–3	Michigan; 17–6–4	Minnesota; 18–7–2	St. Cloud State; 20–7–1	St. Cloud State; 22–7–1	New Hampshire; 19–9–6	New Hampshire; 19–9–6	New Hampshire; 20–10–6	Colorado College; 24–11–1	Minnesota; 27–12–2	7
8	Maine	Maine; 0–1–1	Michigan State; 2–1–1	Colorado College; 4–0–0	New Hampshire; 5–2–1	Western Michigan; 8–1–1	Providence; 7–2–1	Providence; 7–2–3	St. Cloud State; 10–3–1	Minnesota; 10–5–2	St. Cloud State; 13–4–1	Michigan; 13–5–3	Michigan; 15–5–3	Minnesota; 15–6–2	Minnesota; 16–7–2	New Hampshire; 16–7–5	Providence; 15–7–4	New Hampshire; 18–8–6	Colorado College; 20–9–1	Providence; 19–8–5	Colorado College; 22–11–1	Maine; 19–10–7	Providence; 22–12–5	8
9	New Hampshire	Boston University; 0–1–0	Boston University; 1–1–0	Maine; 2–2–1	St. Cloud State; 4–1–1	New Hampshire; 6–3–1	Colorado College; 7–3–0	Colorado College; 8–3–1	Providence; 8–3–3	St. Cloud State; 11–4–1	Minnesota; 10–5–2	Minnesota; 12–5–2	Minnesota; 14–5–2	Michigan; 16–6–3	Western Michigan; 16–5–4	Western Michigan; 16–6–5	New Hampshire; 16–8–6	Providence; 16–8–4	Providence; 17–8–5	Colorado College; 21–10–1	Clarkson; 20–9–3	Providence; 21–11–5	Maine; 19–11–7	9
10	Cornell	St. Cloud State; 1–0–1	St. Cloud State; 3–0–1	Boston University; 1–1–1	Maine; 2–3–2	Northeastern; 5–2–1	St. Cloud State; 6–3–1	St. Cloud State; 8–3–1	Minnesota; 9–5–2	Providence; 8–4–3	Providence; 8–4–3	Providence; 9–5–3	Providence; 11–5–3	Providence; 13–5–3	Maine; 10–7–6	Denver; 14–10–3	Cornell; 11–6–4	Wisconsin; 15–11–4	Wisconsin; 16–12–4	Clarkson; 18–9–3	Maine; 17–10–7	Wisconsin; 21–13–4	Wisconsin; 21–14–4	10
11	Minnesota	Rensselaer; 1–0–0	Colorado College; 2–0–0	St. Cloud State; 4–1–1	Boston University; 2–2–1	Maine; 3–3–2	Maine; 4–3–2	Union; 6–1–1	Maine; 6–4–4	Rensselaer; 8–3–1	Rensselaer; 8–3–1	Wisconsin; 13–9–0	Wisconsin; 13–9–0	Maine; 10–7–6	Providence; 13–7–3	Providence; 13–7–4	Western Michigan; 16–8–5	Maine; 13–9–6	Clarkson; 16–9–3	Wisconsin; 17–13–4	Providence; 19–10–5	Nebraska-Omaha; 24–14–3	St. Lawrence; 20–12–4	11
12	St. Cloud State	Lake Superior State; 3–0–0	Rensselaer; 1–1–0	Northeastern; 4–1–0	Northeastern; 4–2–1	Wisconsin; 7–5–0	Wisconsin; 8–6–0	Maine; 5–4–3	Union; 6–2–2	Ohio State; 9–4–1	Ohio State; 10–5–1	Rensselaer; 9–4–1	Rensselaer; 10–5–1	Denver; 12–9–3	Denver; 12–10–3	Wisconsin; 14–11–1	Minnesota State-Mankato; 17–10–1	St. Lawrence; 13–9–4	Western Michigan; 17–9–6	Maine; 15–10–7	Wisconsin; 19–13–4	New Hampshire; 21–12–6	New Hampshire; 21–12–6	12
13	Nebraska-Omaha	Colorado College; 2–0–0	Nebraska-Omaha; 2–2–0	Nebraska-Omaha; 4–2–0	Western Michigan; 6–1–1	Providence; 5–2–1	Union; 5–1–0	Harvard; 4–2–1	Harvard; 5–3–1	Wisconsin; 11–9–0	Wisconsin; 11–9–0	Vermont; 9–4–0	Vermont; 9–5–1	Rensselaer; 11–6–1	Wisconsin; 14–11–1	Cornell; 9–6–4	Wisconsin; 15–11–2	Western Michigan; 16–9–6	Maine; 14–10–6	St. Lawrence; 16–10–4	Nebraska-Omaha; 22–13–3	Clarkson; 21–11–3	Nebraska-Omaha; 24–15–3	13
14	Lake Superior State	St. Lawrence; 0–1–0	Cornell; 0–0–0	Rensselaer; 2–1–0	Northern Michigan †; 5–1–3	Yale; 3–1–0	Yale; 4–2–0	Northern Michigan; 7–4–4	Wisconsin; 10–8–0	Harvard; 6–4–1	Northern Michigan; 9–5–5	Denver; 11–7–2	Maine; 9–7–5	Wisconsin; 13–10–1	Cornell; 8–5–4	Maine; 10–9–6	Clarkson; 13–8–3	Clarkson †; 14–9–3	St. Lawrence; 14–10–4	Nebraska-Omaha; 20–13–3	Miami; 20–14–2	St. Lawrence; 18–12–4	Clarkson; 21–11–3	14
15	Colorado College	Cornell; 0–0–0	St. Lawrence; 1–2–0	Providence; 4–1–0	Providence †; 4–1–1	Union; 5–1–0	Vermont; 4–2–0	Yale; 5–3–0	Ohio State; 9–4–1	Northern Michigan; 9–5–5	Vermont; 7–4–0	Maine; 9–6–4	Denver; 11–9–2	Cornell; 7–5–3	Clarkson; 10–6–3	Clarkson; 11–7–3	Maine; 11–9–6	Denver †; 15–12–3	Nebraska-Omaha; 18–13–3	Western Michigan; 18–10–6	Denver; 19–13–4	Denver; 19–15–4	Denver; 19–15–4	15
16	Colgate																							16
17	Harvard																							17
18	Clarkson																							18
19	Rensselaer																							19
20	Notre Dame																							20
	Preseason Oct 2	Week 1 Oct 16	Week 2 Oct 23	Week 3 Oct 30	Week 4 Nov 6	Week 5 Nov 13	Week 6 Nov 20	Week 7 Nov 27	Week 8 Dec 4	Week 9 Dec 11	Week 10 Dec 18	Week 11 Jan 2	Week 12 Jan 8	Week 13 Jan 15	Week 14 Jan 22	Week 15 Jan 29	Week 16 Feb 5	Week 17 Feb 12	Week 18 Feb 19	Week 19 Feb 26	Week 20 Mar 5	Week 21 Mar 12	Week 22 Mar 19	
		Dropped: Nebraska-Omaha; 1–1–0; Colgate; 1–1–1; Harvard; 0–0–0; Clarkson; 0–1–1; Notre Dame; 0–2–1	Dropped: Lake Superior State; 3–2–0	Dropped: Cornell; 0–0–0; St. Lawrence; 1–2–0	Dropped: Nebraska-Omaha; 4–4–0; Rensselaer; 2–2–0	Dropped: Boston University; 2–4–1; Northern Michigan; 5–3–3	Dropped: Northeastern; 5–4–1	Dropped: Wisconsin; 8–8–0; Vermont; 4–4–0	Dropped: Northern Michigan; 7–5–5; Yale; 5–5–0	Dropped: Maine; 6–6–4; Union; 6–4–2	Dropped: Harvard; 6–4–1	Dropped: Ohio State; 10–7–1; Northern Michigan; 9–5–5	Dropped: None	Dropped: Vermont; 9–7–1	Dropped: Rensselaer; 11–8–1	Dropped: None	Dropped: Denver; 14–12–3	Dropped: Cornell; 11–8–4; Minnesota State-Mankato; 17–12–1	Dropped: Denver; 15–13–4	Dropped: None	Dropped: St. Lawrence; 16–12–4; Western Michigan; 19–11–6	Dropped: Miami; 20–16–2	Dropped: None	
