= Jeff Campbell (ice hockey) =

Canadian ice hockey player (born 1981)

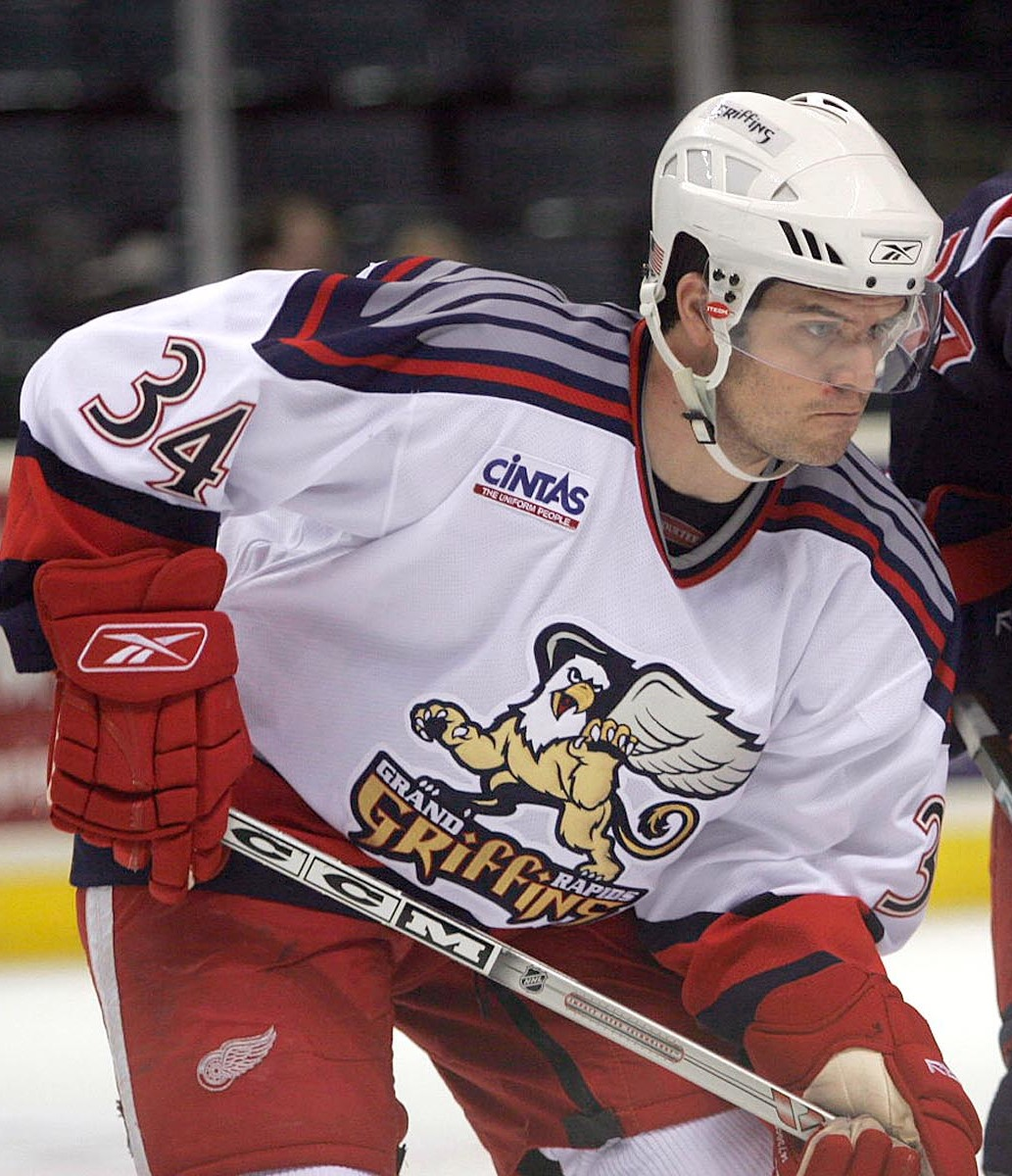
- Campbell with the Grand Rapids Griffins in 2007
- Born: May 9, 1981 (age 43); Hensall, Ontario, Canada
- Height: 5 ft 10 in (178 cm)
- Weight: 176 lb (80 kg; 12 st 8 lb)
- Position: Right wing
- Shoots: Right
- NLB team: SC Langenthal
- NHL draft: Undrafted
- Playing career: 2004–present

Jeff Campbell (born May 9, 1981) is a Canadian professional ice hockey player who is currently playing with the SC Langenthal in the National League B.

== Awards and honours ==
Award	Year
All-CCHA Rookie Team	2000-01
ECHL First All-Star Team	2005–06
ECHL First All-Star Team	2007–08
