= Mike Bishai =

Canadian ice hockey player (born 1979)

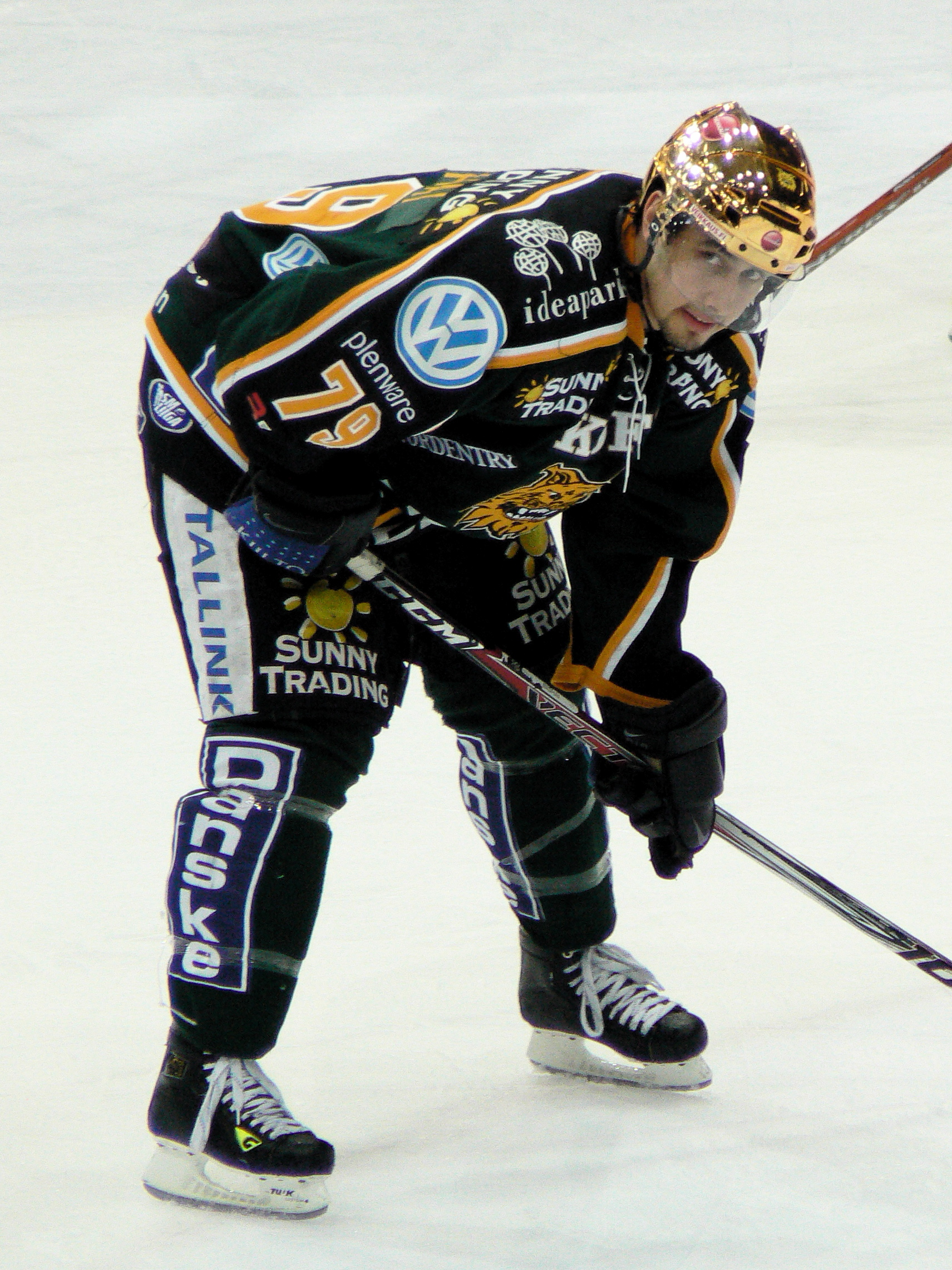
- Bishai playing for Ilves
- Born: May 30, 1979 (age 47) Edmonton, Alberta, Canada
- Height: 6 ft 0 in (183 cm)
- Weight: 185 lb (84 kg; 13 st 3 lb)
- Position: Centre
- Shot: Left
- Played for: Edmonton Oilers; Dynamo Moscow; Ilves; Jokerit
- NHL draft: Undrafted
- Playing career: 2002–2013

Michael Bishai (born May 30, 1979) is a Canadian former professional ice hockey centre. Bishai was never drafted but played in the National Hockey League with the Edmonton Oilers.

== Playing career ==
=== Amateur ===
Born in Edmonton, Alberta, Bishai moved to British Columbia to play junior hockey. Bishai played two seasons with the South Surrey Eagles in the BCHL, before moving on to Western Michigan University, where he played four seasons. In 2001, Bishai led the Central Collegiate Hockey Association in points and led the NCAA in points per game. At the tale end of the 2001–02 season, Bishai signed with Edmonton and was assigned to their AHL affiliate, the Toronto Roadrunners.

=== Professional ===
Bishai played most of his Oiler career with affiliates in the AHL, but in the 2003–04 season, he made his NHL debut and played 14 games with the Oilers. Bishai signed with the Phoenix Coyotes organization before the 2005–06 season and was assigned to its AHL affiliate, the San Antonio Rampage.

Bishai then joined Moscow Dynamo for the 2006–07 season. After playing in only 23 games with Moscow, Bishai left for the Finnish SM-l where he signed with Ilves for the 2007–08 season. After a successful season with Ilves, Mike then signed with rival team Jokerit for the 2008–09 season.

Bishai is most remembered for a fight with Atlanta Thrashers player Serge Aubin on February 11, 2004. The fight, during a line brawl, was notable because Aubin tossed Bishai into the Atlanta bench. Bishai got to his feet and continued to trade punches with Aubin, while stunned Thrashers looked on unsure what to do.

Oilers coach Craig MacTavish commented on the fight and said, "...As many years as I've been in the game, I've never seen a guy fighting standing up in the opposition's bench...That's like diving into somebody else's foxhole."

== Career statistics ==
			Regular season					Playoffs
Season	Team	League	GP	G	A	Pts	PIM	GP	G	A	Pts	PIM
1996–97	South Surrey Eagles	BCHL	38	6	13	19	10	—	—	—	—	—
1997–98	South Surrey Eagles	BCHL	57	48	52	100	36	—	—	—	—	—
1998–99	Western Michigan University	CCHA	26	0	3	3	20	—	—	—	—	—
1999–00	Western Michigan University	CCHA	35	18	19	37	52	—	—	—	—	—
2000–01	Western Michigan University	CCHA	37	23	45	68	37	—	—	—	—	—
2001–02	Western Michigan University	CCHA	34	10	27	37	28	—	—	—	—	—
2001–02	Hamilton Bulldogs	AHL	3	0	0	0	0	—	—	—	—	—
2002–03	Columbus Cottonmouths	ECHL	25	12	17	29	24	—	—	—	—	—
2002–03	Hamilton Bulldogs	AHL	27	7	5	12	11	6	2	1	3	2
2003–04	Toronto Roadrunners	AHL	48	11	22	33	18	3	0	0	0	4
2003–04	Edmonton Oilers	NHL	14	0	2	2	19	—	—	—	—	—
2004–05	Edmonton Roadrunners	AHL	70	10	24	34	36	—	—	—	—	—
2005–06	San Antonio Rampage	AHL	66	13	18	31	40	—	—	—	—	—
2006–07	Moscow Dynamo	RSL	23	2	3	5	34	—	—	—	—	—
2007–08	Ilves	SM-l	49	13	28	41	18	8	1	3	4	39
2008–09	Jokerit	SM-l	18	4	7	11	4	—	—	—	—	—
2011–12	HC Thurgau	NLB	3	0	2	2	2	—	—	—	—	—
2011–12	HC Lausanne	NLB	3	0	0	0	0	—	—	—	—	—
2012–13	SC Bietigheim-Bissingen	2.GBun	6	1	2	3	2	4	0	1	1	10
NHL totals			14	0	2	2	19	—	—	—	—	—

== Awards and honours ==
Award	Year
College
All-CCHA Second Team	2001
AHCA West Second-Team All-American	2001
