= Josh Blackburn =

American ice hockey player (born 1978)

- Born: November 13, 1978 (age 47) Del Rio, Texas, U.S.
- Height: 6 ft 1 in (185 cm)
- Weight: 190 lb (86 kg; 13 st 8 lb)
- Position: Goaltender
- Played for: Augusta Lynx; Columbia Inferno; Corpus Christi Rayz
- NHL draft: 116th overall, 1998; Phoenix Coyotes
- Playing career: 2002–2005

Josh Blackburn (born November 13, 1978, in Del Rio, Texas) is a retired American ice hockey goaltender.

== Playing career ==
He played college hockey for the Michigan Wolverines. After turning professional, he played for the Augusta Lynx and Columbia Inferno in the ECHL and the Corpus Christi Rayz of the Central Hockey League.

After retiring from professional hockey in 2005, Blackburn became a goaltending consultant and opened his own goaltending school. In 2007, Blackburn returned to the University of Michigan as a volunteer assistant coach. In 2018, Blackburn joined Total Package Hockey, a hockey development program, as a goaltending coach.

== Awards and honors ==
Award	Year
All-CCHA Rookie Team	1998–99
CCHA All-Tournament Team	1999
All-CCHA Second Team	2000–01
CCHA All-Tournament Team	2002
