= 2000–01 NCAA Division I men's ice hockey season =

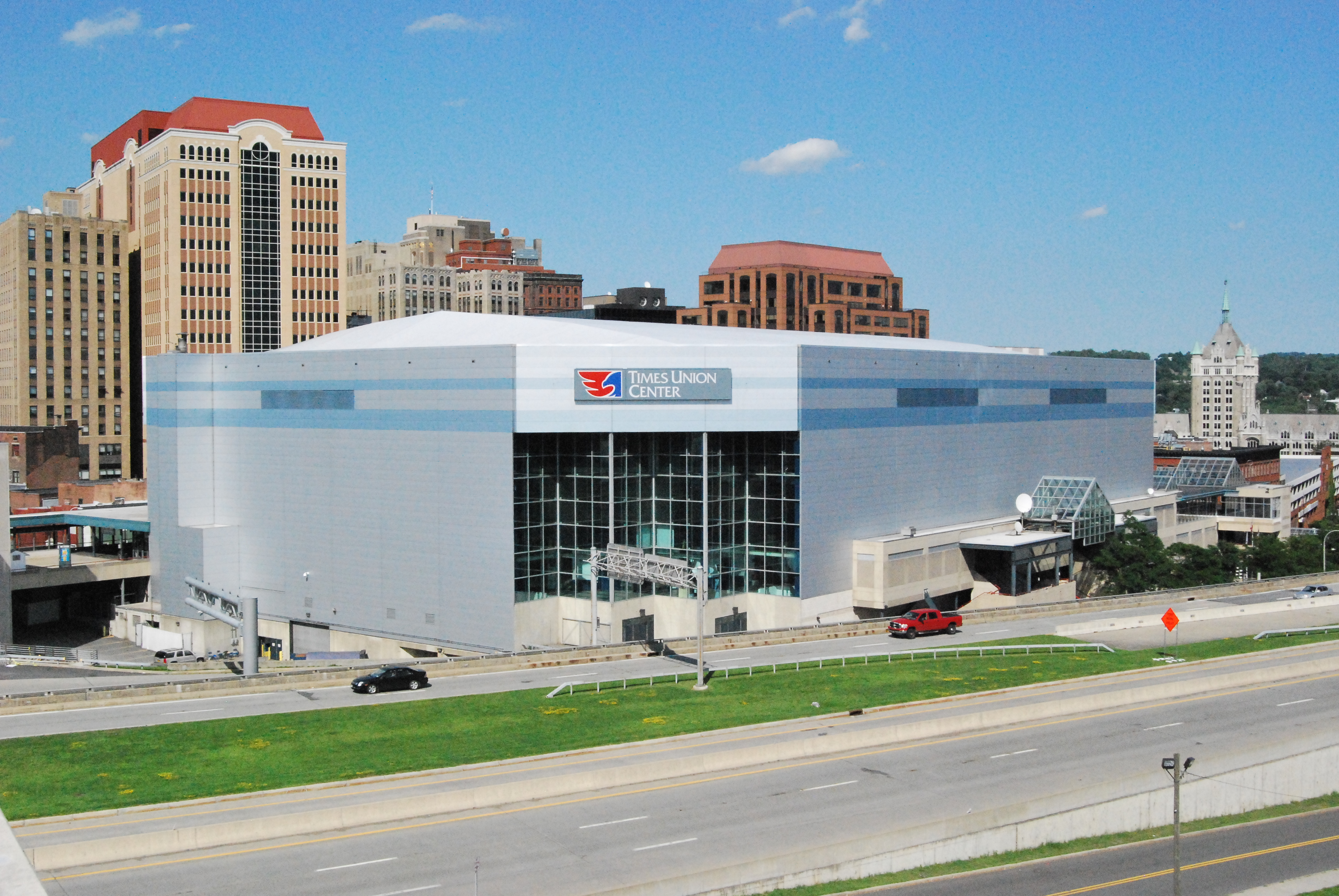
- The Pepsi Arena in Albany, New York hosted the 2001 Frozen Four
- Duration: October 6, 2000– April 7, 2001
- NCAA tournament: 2001
- National championship: Pepsi Arena; Albany, New York
- NCAA champion: Boston College
- Hobey Baker Award: Ryan Miller (Michigan State)

The 2000–01 NCAA Division I men's ice hockey season began on October 6, 2000 and concluded with the 2001 NCAA Division I Men's Ice Hockey Tournament's championship game on April 7, 2001 at the Pepsi Arena in Albany, New York. This was the 54th season in which an NCAA ice hockey championship was held and is the 107th year overall where an NCAA school fielded a team.

== Season Outlook ==
=== Pre-season polls ===
The top teams in the nation as ranked before the start of the season.

The U.S. College Hockey Online poll was voted on by coaches, media, and NHL scouts. The USA Today/American Hockey Magazine poll was voted on by coaches and media.

USCHO Poll
Rank	Team
1	North Dakota (24)
2	Michigan (7)
3	Wisconsin (6)
4	Boston College (3)
5	Michigan State
6	St. Lawrence
7	Boston University
8	Maine
9	New Hampshire
10	Cornell
11	Minnesota
12	St. Cloud State
13	Nebraska-Omaha
14	Lake Superior State
15	Colorado College
16	Colgate
17	Harvard
18	Clarkson
19	Renssealer
20	Notre Dame

USA Today Poll
Rank	Team
1	North Dakota (12)
2	Michigan (4)
3	Wisconsin (2)
4	Michigan State
5	Boston College
6	New Hampshire
7	Boston University
8	St. Lawrence
9	Maine
10	St. Cloud State
11	Cornell
12	Minnesota
13	Lake Superior State
14	Nebraska-Omaha
15	Colorado College

== Regular season ==
=== Season tournaments ===
Tournament	Dates	Teams	Champion
Ice Breaker Tournament	October 6–7	4	New Hampshire
Maverick Stampede	October 13–14	4	Boston College
Black Bear Classic	October 20–21	4	Maine
Johnson Nissan Classic	October 6–7	4	Michigan
College Hockey Showcase	November 23–25	4	
Sheraton/Howard Bank Hockey Classic	November 25–26	4	New Hampshire
Syracuse Invitational	November 25–26	4	Niagara
Florida College Classic	December 27–28	4	Maine
Silverado Shootout	December 28–29	4	Western Michigan
Auld Lang Syne Classic	December 29–30	4	Vermont
Badger Showdown	December 29–30	4	Wisconsin
Denver Cup	December 29–30	4	Denver
Great Lakes Invitational	December 29–30	4	Michigan State
Mariucci Classic	December 29–30	4	Minnesota
Rensselaer Holiday Tournament	December 29–30	4	St. Lawrence
Beanpot	February 5, 12	4	Boston College

=== Standings ===
2000–01 Central Collegiate Hockey Association standings
	Conference							Overall					
	GP	W	L	T	PTS	GF	GA	GP	W	L	T	GF	GA
#3 Michigan State†*	28	21	4	3	45	86	37	42	33	5	4	134	57
Miami	28	17	10	1	35	95	71	38	20	16	2	120	108
#4 Michigan	28	16	9	3	35	102	60	45	27	13	5	167	110
#13 Nebraska-Omaha	28	15	10	3	33	86	80	42	24	15	3	127	107
Northern Michigan	28	12	10	6	30	76	71	38	18	13	7	121	102
Western Michigan	28	12	10	6	30	97	96	39	20	13	6	149	129
Ohio State	28	13	13	2	28	81	89	37	17	18	2	118	117
Ferris State	28	9	15	4	22	64	81	38	13	20	5	91	112
Bowling Green	28	8	15	5	21	72	82	40	16	19	5	109	110
Alaska-Fairbanks	28	7	14	7	21	67	91	36	9	19	8	90	112
Notre Dame	28	7	15	6	20	72	98	39	10	22	7	104	150
Lake Superior State	28	8	20	0	16	53	95	36	13	23	0	79	119
Championship: Michigan State † indicates conference regular season champion * indicates conference tournament champion Final rankings: USA Today/American Hockey Magazine Poll Top 15 Poll

2000–01 College Hockey America standings
	Conference							Overall					
	GP	W	L	T	PTS	GF	GA	GP	W	L	T	GF	GA
Alabama-Huntsville†	20	15	4	1	31	78	49	34	21	12	1	115	87
Niagara	20	10	7	3	23	59	52	38	14	19	5	97	105
Wayne State*	20	8	9	3	19	59	68	35	18	14	3	114	104
Air Force	20	8	10	2	18	57	63	27	10	15	2	66	92
Findlay	19	6	9	4	18	51	61	37	16	17	4	114	109
Bemidji State	19	4	12	3	11	51	62	34	4	26	4	77	133
Championship: Wayne State † indicates conference regular season champion * indicates conference tournament champion Final rankings: USA Today/American Hockey Magazine Poll Top 15 Poll

2000–01 ECAC Hockey standings
	Conference							Overall					
	GP	W	L	T	PTS	GF	GA	GP	W	L	T	GF	GA
#15 Clarkson†	22	15	5	2	32	81	45	35	21	11	3	123	91
#10 St. Lawrence*	22	13	6	3	29	83	70	37	20	13	4	127	120
Harvard	22	12	8	2	26	68	60	33	16	15	2	103	105
Cornell	22	11	8	3	25	44	44	33	16	12	5	73	72
Dartmouth	22	10	8	4	24	67	62	34	16	14	4	101	96
Rensselaer	22	11	9	2	24	62	54	34	17	15	2	107	89
Princeton	22	9	9	4	22	70	66	31	10	16	5	90	103
Yale	22	10	11	1	21	72	80	31	14	16	1	105	114
Union	22	8	12	2	18	54	75	34	12	18	4	88	115
Vermont	22	8	12	2	18	68	69	34	14	18	2	116	110
Colgate	22	8	13	1	17	60	67	34	10	20	4	95	112
Brown	22	2	16	4	8	43	80	29	4	21	4	63	107
Championship: St. Lawrence † indicates conference regular season champion * indicates conference tournament champion (Whitelaw Cup); Final rankings: USA Today/American Hockey Magazine Poll Top 15 Poll

2000–01 Hockey East standings
	Conference							Overall					
	GP	W	L	T	PTS	GF	GA	GP	W	L	T	GF	GA
#1 Boston College†*	24	17	5	2	36	103	57	43	33	8	2	175	98
#7 Maine	24	12	7	5	29	70	62	39	20	12	7	116	95
#11 Providence	24	13	8	3	29	76	71	40	22	13	5	131	108
#14 New Hampshire	24	11	8	5	27	61	47	39	21	12	6	122	86
Massachusetts–Lowell	24	10	11	3	23	67	66	38	19	16	3	124	104
Boston University	24	9	12	3	21	66	77	37	14	20	3	109	118
Northeastern	24	7	13	4	18	58	73	36	13	19	4	102	122
Merrimack	24	7	14	3	17	60	86	38	14	20	4	92	121
Massachusetts	24	7	15	2	16	53	81	34	8	22	4	78	123
Championship: Boston College † indicates conference regular season champion * indicates conference tournament champion Final rankings: USA Today/American Hockey Magazine Poll Top 15 Poll

2000–01 Metro Atlantic Athletic Conference standings
	Conference							Overall					
	GP	W	L	T	PTS	GF	GA	GP	W	L	T	GF	GA
#12 Mercyhurst†*	26	19	6	1	39	110	52	36	22	12	2	140	89
Quinnipiac	26	17	7	2	36	106	67	37	22	11	4	141	106
Iona	26	16	6	4	36	122	84	35	18	13	4	136	121
Canisius	26	13	9	4	30	95	90	33	17	12	4	117	111
Connecticut	26	12	11	3	27	94	86	35	12	19	4	108	123
Sacred Heart	26	11	10	5	27	81	76	31	14	12	5	103	91
Army	26	11	15	0	22	84	101	35	14	20	1	112	132
Fairfield	26	10	14	2	22	82	104	32	11	19	2	101	139
American International	26	10	15	1	21	75	96	31	10	20	1	80	123
Holy Cross	26	8	16	2	18	81	99	32	8	22	2	89	133
Bentley	26	3	21	2	8	67	142	29	4	23	2	72	153
Championship: Mercyhurst † indicates conference regular season champion * indicates conference tournament champion Final rankings: USA Today/American Hockey Magazine Poll Top 15 Poll

2000–01 Western Collegiate Hockey Association standings
	Conference							Overall					
	GP	W	L	T	PTS	GF	GA	GP	W	L	T	GF	GA
#2 North Dakota†	28	18	4	6	42	115	80	46	29	8	9	183	121
#5 St. Cloud State*	28	20	8	0	40	111	69	41	31	9	1	168	94
#9 Minnesota	28	18	8	2	38	107	70	42	27	13	2	171	109
#6 Colorado College	28	17	11	0	34	106	81	41	27	13	1	150	108
#8 Wisconsin	28	14	10	4	32	81	86	41	22	15	4	133	129
Denver	28	14	11	3	31	84	78	38	19	15	4	116	104
Minnesota State-Mankato	28	13	14	1	27	91	99	38	19	18	1	128	135
Michigan Tech	28	6	19	3	15	69	105	36	8	24	4	91	135
Alaska-Anchorage	28	4	20	4	12	61	104	36	7	24	5	82	132
Minnesota-Duluth	28	3	22	3	9	68	121	39	7	28	4	103	166
Championship: St. Cloud State † indicates conference regular season champion * indicates conference tournament champion Final rankings: USA Today/American Hockey Magazine Poll Top 15 Poll

=== Final regular season polls ===
The top 15 teams ranked before the NCAA tournament.

USA Today Poll
Ranking	Team
1	Michigan State
2	Boston College
3	St. Cloud State
4	North Dakota
5	Michigan
6	Colorado College
7	Minnesota
8	Providence
9	Maine
10	St. Lawrence
11	Wisconsin
12	Nebraska Omaha
13	New Hampshire
14	Clarkson
15	Cornell

USCHO Poll
Ranking	Team
1	Michigan State
2	Boston College
3	St. Cloud State
4	North Dakota
5	Michigan
6	Colorado College
7	Minnesota
8	Providence
9	Maine
10	Wisconsin
11	St. Lawrence
12	New Hampshire
13	Nebraska-Omaha
14	Clarkson
15	Denver

== 2001 NCAA Tournament ==
First Round
1	Boston College	–
–	bye	–
East Regional
4	Minnesota	4
5	Maine	5*
2	St. Cloud State	–
–	bye	–
West Regional
3	Michigan	4
6	Mercyhurst	3
1	Michigan State	–
–	bye	–
West Regional
4	Wisconsin	4
5	Providence	1
2	North Dakota	–
–	bye	–
East Regional
3	Colorado College	3**
6	St. Lawrence	2

Quarterfinals
1	Boston College	3
5	Maine	1
2	St. Cloud State	3
3	Michigan	4
1	Michigan State	5
4	Wisconsin	1
2	North Dakota	4
3	Colorado College	1

Frozen Four
E1	Boston College	4
W3	Michigan	2
W1	Michigan State	0
E2	North Dakota	2

National Championship
E1	Boston College	3*
E2	North Dakota	2

Note: * denotes overtime period(s)

== Player stats ==
=== Scoring leaders ===
The following players led the league in points at the conclusion of the season.

GP = Games played; G = Goals; A = Assists; Pts = Points; PIM = Penalty minutes

Player	Class	Team	GP	G	A	Pts	PIM
Jeff Panzer	Senior	North Dakota	46	26	55	81	28
Bryan Lundbohm	Junior	North Dakota	46	32	37	69	38
Mike Bishai	Junior	Western Michigan	37	23	45	68	37
Andy Hilbert	Sophomore	Michigan	42	26	37	63	27
Mike Cammalleri	Sophomore	Michigan	42	29	32	61	29
Erik Westrum	Senior	Minnesota	42	26	35	61	84
Ryan Bayda	Sophomore	North Dakota	46	25	34	59	48
David Gove	Senior	Western Michigan	39	22	37	59	16
Peter Sejna	Freshman	Colorado College	41	29	29	58	10
Dany Heatley	Sophomore	Wisconsin	39	24	33	57	74

=== Leading goaltenders ===
The following goaltenders led the league in goals against average at the end of the regular season while playing at least 33% of their team's total minutes.

GP = Games played; Min = Minutes played; W = Wins; L = Losses; OT = Overtime/shootout losses; GA = Goals against; SO = Shutouts; SV% = Save percentage; GAA = Goals against average

Player	Class	Team	GP	Min	W	L	OT	GA	SO	SV%	GAA
Ryan Miller	Sophomore	Michigan State	40	2445	31	5	4	54	10	.950	1.32
Mike Walsh	Sophomore	Clarkson	21	1290	15	4	1	39	4	.924	1.81
Matt Underhill	Junior	Cornell	25	1503	13	8	3	47	1	.928	1.88
Ty Conklin	Senior	New Hampshire	34	2048	17	12	5	70	5	.920	2.05
Scott Clemmensen	Senior	Boston College	39	2316	30	7	2	82	3	.914	2.12
Colin Zulianello	Senior	Colorado College	17	950	9	7	1	35	0	.918	2.21
Scott Meyer	Senior	St. Cloud State	36	2095	25	8	1	78	2	.926	2.23
Josh Blackburn	Junior	Michigan	45	2646	26	13	5	101	5	.905	2.29
Nathan Marsters	Freshman	Rensselaer	28	1632	14	13	1	64	4	.929	2.35
Phil Osaer	Junior	Ferris State	25	1449	9	12	3	57	3	.909	2.36

== Awards ==
=== NCAA ===
Award		Recipient
Hobey Baker Memorial Award		Ryan Miller, Michigan State
Spencer T. Penrose Award (Coach of the Year)		Dean Blais, North Dakota
Most Outstanding Player in NCAA Tournament		Chuck Kobasew, Boston College
AHCA All-American Teams
East First Team	Position	West First Team
Ty Conklin, New Hampshire	G	Ryan Miller, Michigan State
Bobby Allen, Boston College	D	Jordan Leopold, Minnesota
Kent Huskins, Clarkson	D	Travis Roche, North Dakota
Erik Anderson, St. Lawrence	F	Dany Heatley, Wisconsin
Brian Gionta, Boston College	F	Andy Hilbert, Michigan
Jeff Hamilton, Yale	F	Jeff Panzer, North Dakota
East Second Team	Position	West Second Team
Nolan Schaefer, Providence	G	Scott Meyer, St. Cloud State
Matt Desrosiers, St. Lawrence	D	Jeff Jillson, Michigan
Ron Hainsey, Massachusetts-Lowell	D	Greg Zanon, Nebraska-Omaha
Carl Corazzini, Boston University	F	Mike Bishai, Western Michigan
Krys Kolanos, Boston College	F	Mike Cammalleri, Michigan
Devin Rask, Providence	F	Mark Cullen, Colorado College
	F	Bryan Lundbohm, North Dakota

=== CCHA ===
Awards		Recipient
Player of the Year		Ryan Miller, Michigan State
Best Defensive Forward		John Nail, Michigan State
Best Defensive Defenseman		Andrew Hutchinson, Michigan State
Best Offensive Defenseman		Greg Zanon, Nebraska-Omaha
Rookie of the Year		R. J. Umberger, Ohio State
Goaltender of the Year		Ryan Miller, Michigan State
Coach of the Year		Enrico Blasi, Miami
Terry Flanagan Memorial Award		Doug Schueller, Bowling Green
Ilitch Humanitarian Award		Jason Cupp, Nebraska-Omaha
Most Valuable Player in Tournament		Ryan Miller, Michigan State
All-CCHA Teams
First Team	Position	Second Team
Ryan Miller, Michigan State	G	Josh Blackburn, Michigan
	G	Phil Osaer, Ferris State
Jeff Jillson, Michigan	D	Andrew Hutchinson, Michigan State
Greg Zanon, Nebraska-Omaha	D	John-Michael Liles, Michigan State
Andy Hilbert, Michigan	F	Mike Bishai, Western Michigan
Mike Cammalleri, Michigan	F	Jason Deskins, Miami
David Brisson, Nebraska-Omaha	F	David Gove, Western Michigan
Rookie Team	Position	
Dan Ellis, Nebraska-Omaha	G	
Mike Komisarek, Michigan	D	
Brett Lebda, Notre Dame	D	
Jeff Campbell, Michigan	F	
David Steckel, Ohio State	F	
R.J. Umberger, Ohio State	F	

=== CHA ===
Award		Recipient
Player of the Year		Marc Kielkucki, Air Force
Rookie of the Year		Kevin Fines, Findlay
Coach of the Year		Craig Barnett, Findlay
Student-Athlete of the Year		Scott Bradley, Air Force
Most Valuable Player in Tournament		David Guerrera, Wayne State
All-CHA Teams
First Team	Position	Second Team
Marc Kielkucki, Air Force	G	Kevin Fines, Findlay
Brant Somerville, Findlay	D	Clay Simmonds, Bemidji State
Darren Curry, Alabama-Huntsville	D	Tyler Kindle, Wayne State
Brian Gornick, Air Force	F	Karlis Zirnis, Alabama-Huntsville
Dwayne Blais, Alabama-Huntsville	F	Bernie Sigrist, Niagara
Jason Durbin, Wayne State	F	Andy Berg, Air Force
Rookie Team	Position	
Kevin Fines, Findlay	G	
Joe Locallo, Air Force	D	
Bryce Methvan, Bemidji State	D	
Aaron Weegar, Findlay	F	
Christian Olson, Findlay	F	
Chris Vail, Wayne State	F	

=== ECAC ===
Award		Recipient
Player of the Year		Erik Anderson, St. Lawrence
Rookie of the Year		Rob McFeeters, Clarkson
Coach of the Year		Mark Morris, Clarkson
Best Defensive Forward		Mike Gellard, St. Lawrence
Best Defensive Defenseman		Kent Huskins, Clarkson
Ken Dryden Award		Oliver Jonas, Harvard
Most Outstanding Player in Tournament		Jeremy Symington, St. Lawrence
All-ECAC Hockey Teams
First Team	Position	Second Team
Oliver Jonas, Harvard	G	Mike Walsh, Clarkson
Matt Desrosiers, St. Lawrence	D	Trevor Byrne, Dartmouth
Kent Huskins, Clarkson	D	Cory Murphy, Colgate
Erik Anderson, St. Lawrence	F	Dominic Moore, Harvard
Mike Gellard, St. Lawrence	F	Sean Nolan, Colgate
Jeff Hamilton, Yale	F	Matt Poapst, Clarkson
Rookie Team	Position	
Nathan Marsters, Rensselaer	G	
Jeff Dwyer, Yale	D	
Rob Brown, Colgate	D	
Patrick Sharp, Vermont	F	
Rob McFeeters, Clarkson	F	
Tim Pettit, Harvard	F	

=== Hockey East ===
Award		Recipient
Player of the Year		Brian Gionta, Boston College
Rookie of the Year		Chuck Kobasew, Boston College
Bob Kullen Coach of the Year Award		Paul Pooley, Providence
Len Ceglarski Sportsmanship Award		Mike Jozefowicz, Northeastern
Best Defensive Forward		Mike Lephart, Boston College
Best Defensive Defenseman		Bobby Allen, Boston College
Three-Stars Award		Brian Gionta, Boston College
William Flynn Tournament Most Valuable Player		Chuck Kobasew, Boston College
All-Hockey East Teams
First Team	Position	Second Team
Ty Conklin, New Hampshire	G	Nolan Schaefer, Providence
Bobby Allen, Boston College	D	Jim Fahey, Northeastern
Ron Hainsey, Massachusetts-Lowell	D	Matt Libby, Providence
Brian Gionta, Boston College	F	Anthony Aquino, Merrimack
Carl Corazzini, Boston University	F	Chuck Kobasew, Boston College
Devin Rask, Providence	F	Krys Kolanos, Boston College
Rookie Team	Position	
Joe Exter, Merrimack	G	
J. D. Forrest, Boston College	D	
Regan Kelly, Providence	D	
Ben Eaves, Boston College	F	
Chuck Kobasew, Boston College	F	
Laurent Meunier, Massachusetts-Lowell	F	

=== MAAC ===
Award		Recipient
Offensive Player of the Year		Ryan Manitowich, Iona
Defensive Player of the Year		Nathan Lutz, Iona
Goaltender of the Year		Peter Aubry, Mercyhurst
Offensive Rookie of the Year		Adam Tackaberry, Mercyhurst
Defensive Rookie of the Year		Eric Nelson, Connecticut
Coach of the Year		Rick Gotkin, Mercyhurst
Tournament Most Valuable Player		Jeff Gould, Mercyhurst
All-MAAC Teams
First Team	Position	Second Team
Peter Aubry, Mercyhurst	G	Eddy Ferhi, Sacred Heart
Nathan Lutz, Iona	D	Jody Robinson, Mercyhurst
Aaron Arnett, American International	D	Steve Tobio, Bentley
Ryan Manitowich, Iona	F	Michael Goldkind, Connecticut
Chris Cerrella, Quinnipiac	F	Louis Goulet, Mercyhurst
Eric Ellis, Mercyhurst	F	Tom McMonagle, Mercyhurst
Rookie Team	Position	
Justin Eddy, Quinnipiac	G	
Eric Nelson, Connecticut	D	
R.J. Irving, Holy Cross	D	
Adam Tackaberry, Mercyhurst	F	
Guillaume Caron, American International	F	
Trent Ulmer, American International	F	
Greg Kealey, Holy Cross	F	

=== WCHA ===
Award		Recipient
Player of the Year		Jeff Panzer, North Dakota
Defensive Player of the Year		Jordan Leopold, Minnesota
Rookie of the Year		Peter Sejna, Colorado College
Student-Athlete of the Year		Karl Goehring, North Dakota
Coach of the Year		Dean Blais, North Dakota
Most Valuable Player in Tournament		Tyler Arnason, St. Cloud State
All-WCHA Teams
First Team	Position	Second Team
Scott Meyer, St. Cloud State	G	Wade Dubielewicz, Denver
Travis Roche, North Dakota	D	Duvie Westcott, St. Cloud State
Jordan Leopold, Minnesota	D	Paul Manning, Colorado College
Jeff Panzer, North Dakota	F	Erik Westrum, Minnesota
Bryan Lundbohm, North Dakota	F	Dany Heatley, Wisconsin
Mark Cullen, Colorado College	F	Ryan Bayda, North Dakota
Third Team	Position	Rookie Team
Adam Hauser, Minnesota	G	Chris King, Alaska-Anchorage
Ben Christopherson, Minnesota State-Mankato	D	Ryan Cladwell, Denver
Tom Preissing, Colorado College	D	Paul Martin, Minnesota
Peter Sejna, Colorado College	F	Peter Sejna, Colorado College
Mark Hartigan, St. Cloud State	F	Grant Potulny, Minnesota
Brandon Sampair, St. Cloud State	F	Troy Riddle, Minnesota

== 2001 NHL entry draft ==
Round	Pick	Player	College	Conference	NHL team
1	7	Mike Komisarek	Michigan	CCHA	Montreal Canadiens
1	14	Chuck Kobasew	Boston College	Hockey East	Calgary Flames
1	16	R. J. Umberger	Ohio State	CCHA	Vancouver Canucks
1	30	Dave Steckel	Ohio State	CCHA	Los Angeles Kings
2	38	Tim Jackman	Minnesota State–Mankato	WCHA	Columbus Blue Jackets
2	49	Michael Cammalleri	Michigan	CCHA	Los Angeles Kings
2	52	Eddie Caron ^{†}	New Hampshire	Hockey East	Edmonton Oilers
2	54	Noah Welch ^{†}	Harvard	ECAC Hockey	Pittsburgh Penguins
3	81	Neil Komadoski	Notre Dame	CCHA	Ottawa Senators
3	84	Kenny Smith	Harvard	ECAC Hockey	Edmonton Oilers
3	91	Kevin Estrada ^{†}	Michigan State	CCHA	Carolina Hurricanes
3	92	Anthony Aquino	Merrimack	Hockey East	Dallas Stars
3	95	Patrick Sharp	Vermont	ECAC Hockey	Philadelphia Flyers
4	100	Brian Sipotz	Miami	CCHA	Atlanta Thrashers
4	111	Matti Kaltiainen ^{†}	Boston College	Hockey East	Boston Bruins
4	112	Milan Gajic ^{†}	Michigan	CCHA	Atlanta Thrashers
4	113	Bryce Lampman ^{†}	Nebraska–Omaha	CCHA	New York Rangers
4	116	Richard Petiot ^{†}	Colorado College	WCHA	Los Angeles Kings
4	117	Michael Woodford ^{†}	Michigan	CCHA	Florida Panthers
4	118	Brandon Rogers ^{†}	Michigan	CCHA	Mighty Ducks of Anaheim
4	131	Ben Eaves	Boston College	Hockey East	Pittsburgh Penguins
5	135	Colin Stuart	Colorado College	WCHA	Atlanta Thrashers
5	138	Paul Lynch ^{†}	Maine	Hockey East	Tampa Bay Lightning
5	143	František Skladaný	Boston University	Hockey East	Colorado Avalanche
5	145	Jim Hakewill ^{†}	St. Lawrence	ECAC Hockey	Calgary Flames
5	148	David Klema ^{†}	Boston University	Hockey East	Phoenix Coyotes
5	150	Bernd Brückler ^{†}	Wisconsin	WCHA	Philadelphia Flyers
5	151	Kevin Bieksa	Bowling Green	CCHA	Vancouver Canucks
5	152	Terry Denike ^{†}	Lake Superior State	CCHA	Los Angeles Kings
5	154	Jake Brenk ^{†}	Minnesota State–Mankato	WCHA	Edmonton Oilers
5	156	Andy Schneider ^{†}	North Dakota	WCHA	Pittsburgh Penguins
6	173	Justin Aikins ^{†}	New Hampshire	Hockey East	Columbus Blue Jackets
6	179	Andrew Alberts ^{†}	Boston College	Hockey East	Boston Bruins
6	180	Scott Polaski ^{†}	Colorado College	WCHA	Phoenix Coyotes
6	182	Tom Cavanagh ^{†}	Harvard	ECAC Hockey	San Jose Sharks
6	184	Scott Horvath	Massachusetts	Hockey East	Colorado Avalanche
6	188	Art Femenella ^{†}	Vermont	ECAC Hockey	Tampa Bay Lightning
6	194	James Massen ^{†}	North Dakota	WCHA	New Jersey Devils
7	201	Colin FitzRandolph ^{†}	St. Lawrence	ECAC Hockey	Atlanta Thrashers
7	209	Jordan Sigalet ^{†}	Bowling Green	CCHA	Boston Bruins
7	219	Dennis Packard	Harvard	ECAC Hockey	Tampa Bay Lightning
7	220	David Moss ^{†}	Michigan	CCHA	Calgary Flames
7	223	Brandon Bochenski ^{†}	North Dakota	WCHA	Ottawa Senators
8	229	Aaron Voros ^{†}	Alaska–Fairbanks	CCHA	New Jersey Devils
8	233	Joe Campbell ^{†}	Wisconsin	WCHA	Calgary Flames
8	235	Neil Petruic ^{†}	Minnesota–Duluth	WCHA	Ottawa Senators
8	237	Mike Gabinet	Nebraska–Omaha	CCHA	Los Angeles Kings
8	242	Andrew Murray ^{†}	Bemidji State	CHA	Columbus Blue Jackets
8	249	Matt Maglione ^{†}	Princeton	ECAC Hockey	Washington Capitals
8	250	Brandon Crawford-West ^{†}	Miami	CCHA	Pittsburgh Penguins
8	255	Marco Rosa	Merrimack	Hockey East	Dallas Stars
8	256	Gregg Johnson	Boston University	Hockey East	New Jersey Devils
9	260	Bryan Perez ^{†}	Michigan Tech	WCHA	New York Islanders
9	268	Jeff Miles	Vermont	ECAC Hockey	Chicago Blackhawks
9	276	Mike Knoepfli ^{†}	Cornell	ECAC Hockey	Toronto Maple Leafs
9	288	Francois Senez	Rensselaer	ECAC Hockey	Detroit Red Wings

† incoming freshman

== See also ==
- 2000–01 NCAA Division III men's ice hockey season
