= Neil Petruic =

Canadian ice hockey player

- Born: July 30, 1982 (age 43) Regina, Saskatchewan, Canada
- Height: 6 ft 1 in (185 cm)
- Weight: 200 lb (91 kg; 14 st 4 lb)
- Position: Defence
- Shot: Left
- Played for: Binghamton Senators; Manitoba Moose; Hamilton Bulldogs
- NHL draft: 235th overall, 2001; Ottawa Senators
- Playing career: 2005–2011

Neil Petruic (born July 30, 1982) is a Canadian former professional ice hockey player. He was selected by the Ottawa Senators in the 8th round (235th overall) of the 2001 NHL entry draft. Prior to the 2010–11 season, on September 24, 2010, Petruic signed a contract with the Hamilton Bulldogs and was invited to NHL affiliate, the Montreal Canadiens training camp, before returning to the Bulldogs.

== Career statistics ==
=== Regular season and playoffs ===
			Regular season					Playoffs
Season	Team	League	GP	G	A	Pts	PIM	GP	G	A	Pts	PIM
1998–99	Regina Pat Canadians AAA	SMHL	44	3	19	22	73	10	0	2	2	10
1999–2000	Kindersley Klippers	SJHL	60	4	19	23	144	—	—	—	—	—
2000–01	Kindersley Klippers	SJHL	68	18	24	42	123	—	—	—	—	—
2001–02	University of Minnesota Duluth	WCHA	40	3	6	9	54	—	—	—	—	—
2002–03	University of Minnesota Duluth	WCHA	40	6	8	14	78	—	—	—	—	—
2003–04	University of Minnesota Duluth	WCHA	45	4	10	14	56	—	—	—	—	—
2004–05	University of Minnesota Duluth	WCHA	32	1	8	9	63	—	—	—	—	—
2005–06	Binghamton Senators	AHL	51	1	3	4	31	—	—	—	—	—
2005–06	Charlotte Checkers	ECHL	10	2	4	6	6	—	—	—	—	—
2006–07	Binghamton Senators	AHL	74	1	12	13	89	—	—	—	—	—
2007–08	HC Bolzano	ITA	32	1	10	11	62	7	0	5	5	14
2008–09	Stockton Thunder	ECHL	14	2	2	4	12	—	—	—	—	—
2008–09	Binghamton Senators	AHL	64	1	7	8	62	—	—	—	—	—
2009–10	Manitoba Moose	AHL	13	1	1	2	8	—	—	—	—	—
2009–10	Victoria Salmon Kings	ECHL	3	0	1	1	2	—	—	—	—	—
2009–10	Binghamton Senators	AHL	29	1	3	4	8	—	—	—	—	—
2010–11	Hamilton Bulldogs	AHL	53	1	2	3	47	19	0	1	1	10
2011–12	Bienfait Coalers	B6HL	18	9	11	20		14	5	7	12
2012–13	Bienfait Coalers	B6HL	19	7	13	20		8	0	9	9
2013–14	Bienfait Coalers	B6HL	15	5	3	8	37	—	—	—	—	—
AHL totals			284	6	28	34	245	19	0	1	1	10
