= Andy Hilbert =

American ice hockey player (born 1981)

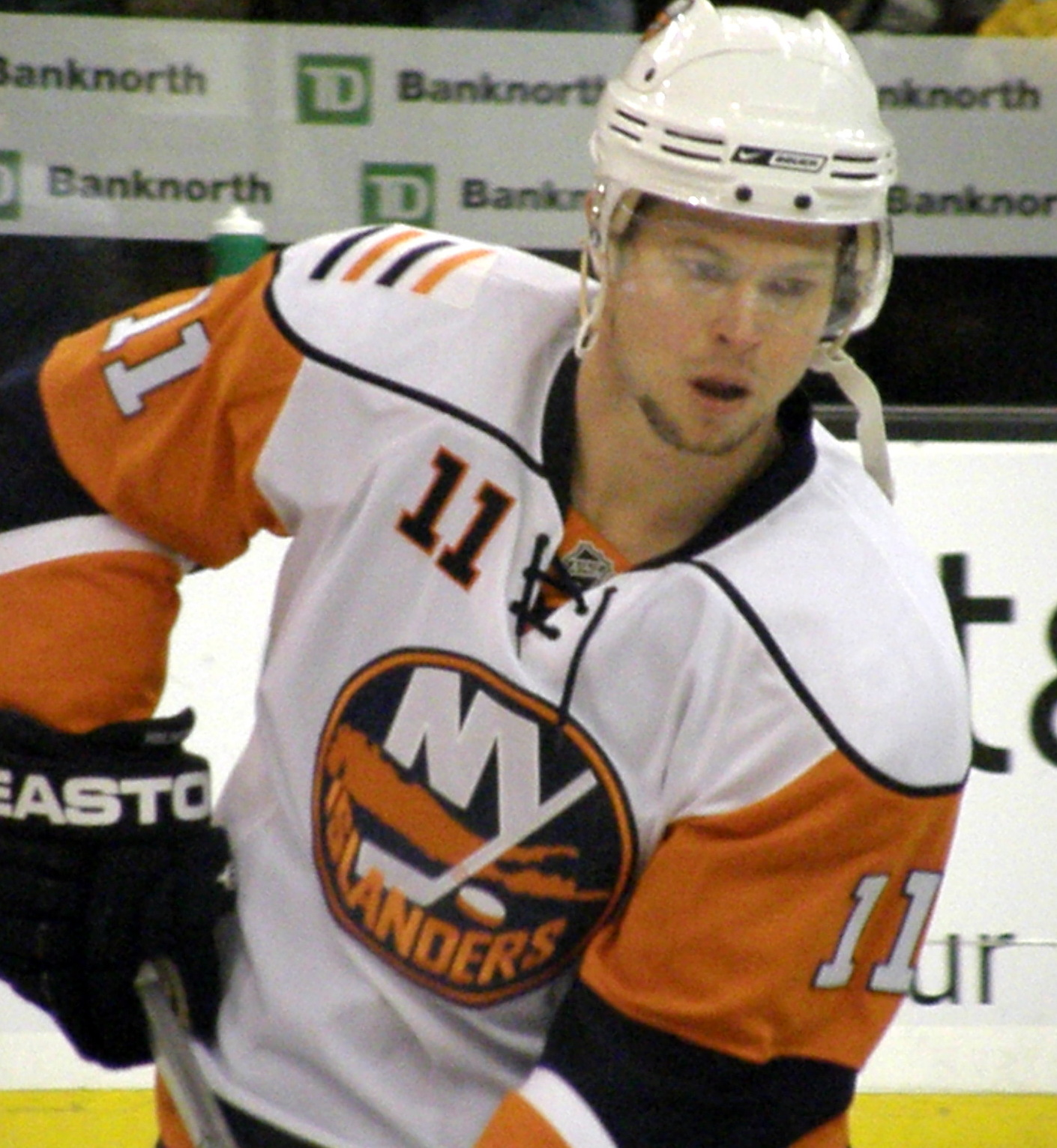
- Hilbert with the New York Islanders in 2008
- Born: February 6, 1981 (age 45) Howell, Michigan, U.S.
- Height: 5 ft 10 in (178 cm)
- Weight: 188 lb (85 kg; 13 st 6 lb)
- Position: Center/Left wing
- Shot: Left
- Played for: Boston Bruins; Chicago Blackhawks; Pittsburgh Penguins; New York Islanders; Minnesota Wild
- National team: United States
- NHL draft: 37th overall, 2000; Boston Bruins
- Playing career: 2001–2010

Andrew John Hilbert (born February 6, 1981) is an American former professional ice hockey forward who played in the National Hockey League with the Boston Bruins, Chicago Blackhawks, Pittsburgh Penguins, New York Islanders and the Minnesota Wild.

== Playing career ==
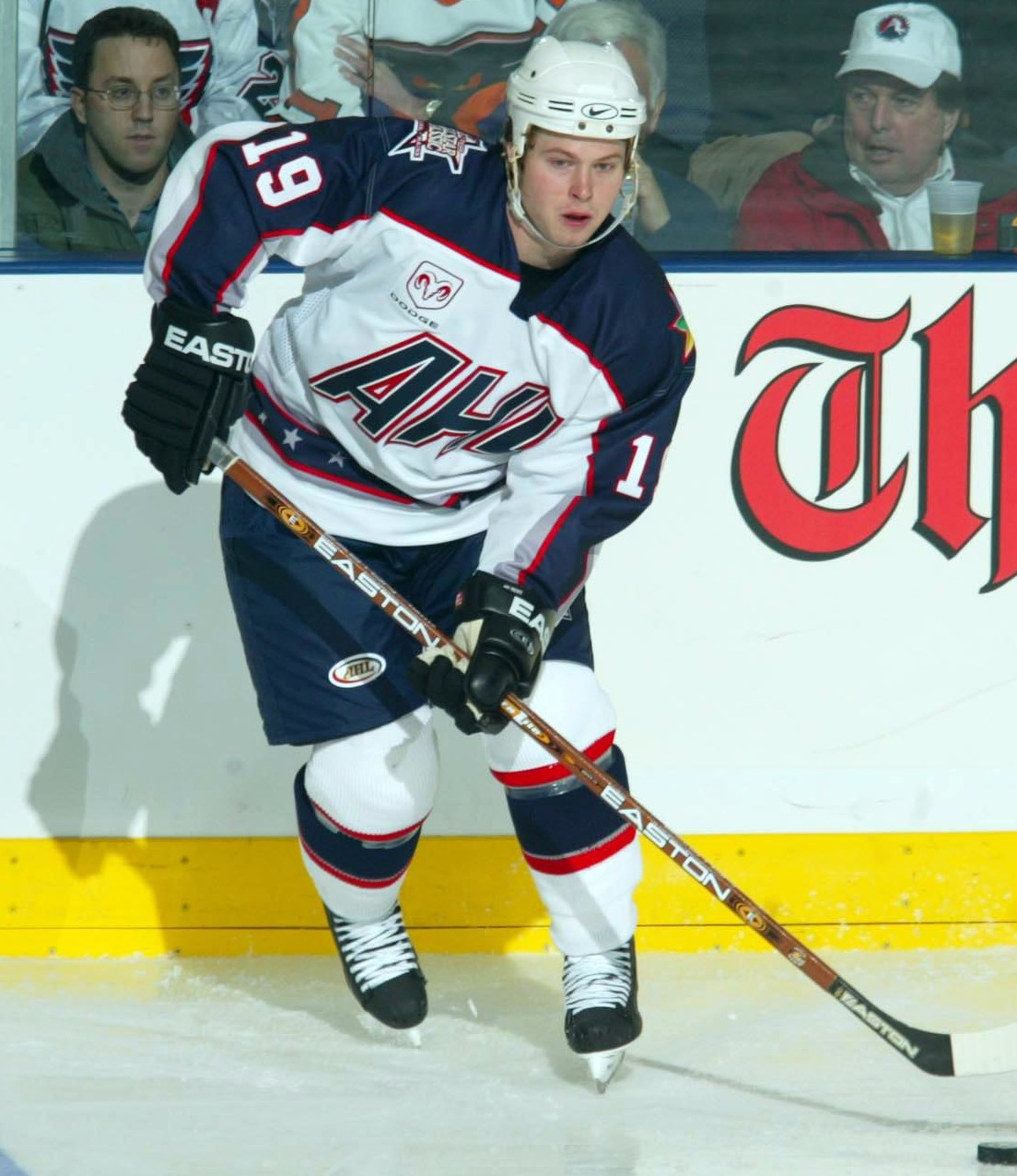
Hilbert in the 2003 AHL All-Star Game

As a youth, Hilbert played in the 1995 Quebec International Pee-Wee Hockey Tournament with the Detroit Little Caesars minor ice hockey team.

Hilbert was drafted by the Boston Bruins in the 2nd round (37th overall) in the 2000 NHL entry draft from the University of Michigan of the Central Collegiate Hockey Association. In his sophomore year, Hilber was named an AHCA West First-Team All-American and All-CCHA First Team. On July 9, 2001, Hilbert chose to conclude his collegiate career and turn professional. In his rookie season with the Boston Bruins American Hockey League affiliate, the Providence Bruins, Hilbert was named to the AHL All-Rookie Team and AHL All-Star Classic.

Hilbert missed the beginning of the 2003–04 season due to a groin injury. This kept him to a total of 19 AHL games.

On February 9, 2005, Hilbert was named to the AHL All-Star Classic as a replacement for Thomas Vanek.

In November 2005, Hilbert was traded by the Bruins to the Chicago Blackhawks for a 5th round selection in the 2006 NHL entry draft. In the same season he was claimed off waivers by the Pittsburgh Penguins on March 9, 2006.

On July 4, 2006, Hilbert was signed as a free agent to a one-year contract with the New York Islanders. Hilbert produced a career high 28 points in his first full season in the NHL with the Islanders in 2006-07, and was subsequently rewarded with a two-year contract extension on July 3, 2007.

As a free agent, Hilbert was belatedly signed prior to the 2009-10 season to a one-year contract with the Minnesota Wild on October 1, 2009.

He returned to the Islanders organization the following year on August 18, 2010. However, due to injury was forced to retire.

== Career statistics ==
=== Regular season and playoffs ===
			Regular season					Playoffs
Season	Team	League	GP	G	A	Pts	PIM	GP	G	A	Pts	PIM
1997–98	U.S. NTDP U17	USDP	29	14	10	24	34	—	—	—	—	—
1997–98	U.S. NTDP U18	NAHL	39	19	16	35	102	—	—	—	—	—
1998–99	U.S. NTDP Juniors	USHL	45	23	35	58	140	—	—	—	—	—
1999–2000	University of Michigan	CCHA	38	17	16	33	47	—	—	—	—	—
2000–01	University of Michigan	CCHA	42	26	38	64	72	—	—	—	—	—
2001–02	Providence Bruins	AHL	72	26	27	53	74	2	0	0	0	2
2001–02	Boston Bruins	NHL	6	1	0	1	2	—	—	—	—	—
2002–03	Providence Bruins	AHL	64	35	35	70	119	4	0	1	1	4
2002–03	Boston Bruins	NHL	14	0	3	3	7	—	—	—	—	—
2003–04	Providence Bruins	AHL	19	3	5	8	20	—	—	—	—	—
2003–04	Boston Bruins	NHL	18	2	0	2	9	5	1	0	1	0
2004–05	Providence Bruins	AHL	79	37	42	79	83	17	7	14	21	27
2005–06	Chicago Blackhawks	NHL	28	5	4	9	22	—	—	—	—	—
2005–06	Pittsburgh Penguins	NHL	19	7	11	18	16	—	—	—	—	—
2006–07	New York Islanders	NHL	81	8	20	28	34	5	0	0	0	2
2007–08	New York Islanders	NHL	70	8	8	16	18	—	—	—	—	—
2008–09	New York Islanders	NHL	67	11	16	27	22	—	—	—	—	—
2009–10	Houston Aeros	AHL	33	9	16	25	8	—	—	—	—	—
2009–10	Minnesota Wild	NHL	4	0	0	0	2	—	—	—	—	—
AHL totals			272	113	129	242	306	23	7	15	22	33
NHL totals			307	42	62	104	132	10	1	0	1	2

=== International ===
Medal record

Representing United States

World Championships
Bronze medal – third place	2004 Czech Republic	

Year	Team	Event	Result	GP	G	A	Pts	PIM
1999	United States	WJC	8th	6	2	3	5	0
1999	United States	WJC18	7th	6	6	1	7	4
2000	United States	WJC	4th	7	1	1	2	0
2001	United States	WJC	5th	7	4	5	9	6
2002	United States	WC	7th	7	2	1	3	6
2004	United States	WC	3rd place, bronze medalist(s)	6	0	0	0	2
2006	United States	WC	7th	7	0	3	3	10
Junior totals				26	13	10	23	10
Senior totals				20	2	4	6	18

== Awards and honors ==
Award	Year
College
All-CCHA Rookie Team	1999–00
All-CCHA First Team	2000–01
AHCA West First-Team All-American	2000–01
AHL
All-Rookie Team	2002
Second all-star team	2005
AHL All-Star Classic	2002, 2003, 2005
