= 1999–2000 North Dakota Fighting Sioux men's ice hockey season =

1999–00 North Dakota Fighting Sioux men's ice hockey season

NCAA Division I National Champion Badger Showdown, champion WCHA Tournament, champion NCAA Tournament, champion
- Conference: 2nd WCHA
- Home ice: Ralph Engelstad Arena

Rankings
- USCHO: 2
- USA Today: 1

Record
- Overall: 31–8–5
- Conference: 17–6–5
- Home: 14–4–1
- Road: 9–4–4
- Neutral: 8–0–0

Coaches and captains
- Head coach: Dean Blais
- Assistant coaches: Scott Sandelin; Mark Poolman; Jeff Bowen; Lee Davidson
- Captain: Peter Armbrust
- Alternate captain(s): Lee Goren; Jason Ulmer

The 1999–2000 North Dakota Fighting Sioux men's ice hockey season was the 59th season of play for the program. They represented the University of North Dakota in the 1999–2000 NCAA Division I men's ice hockey season and for the 49th season in the Western Collegiate Hockey Association (WCHA). The Fighting Sioux were coached by Dean Blais, in his 6th season, and played their home games at Ralph Engelstad Arena.

== Season ==
After getting knocked out in the first round of the NCAA Tournament in back-to-back years, North Dakota was champing at the bit for another chance to prove themselves. Led by Peter Armbrust, Lee Goren and Jason Ulmer, three seniors who had won a national championship as freshmen, the Fighting Sioux entered the season as one of the favorites to compete for a championship.

=== Early success ===
Relying heavily on junior netminder, Karl Goehring, the team began their season with an almost flawless start. After taking three out of four points on the road from long-time rival Minnesota, North Dakota travelled east and swept #7 Clarkson. While they got a fight in the second game, the win established the Sioux early on and they rose up to #1 in the polls in early-November.

=== Goaltending battle ===
Goehring didn't drop a match until his 10th game of the season. While backup netminder Andy Kollar started the following game, that was due mostly to the weakness of the opposition. Goehring was back in net the very next contest but allowed 6 goals for the second consecutive game. Kollar was put in goal for the next four games and while his numbers weren't spectacular, UND won three of the matches. However, Kollar lost the starting job after a poor performance against Denver, one of the weaker teams in the conference. The two would continue to share the goal crease for the remainder of the season, though Goehring did retain the lion's share of the starts.

=== Ups and downs ===
After the loss to Denver, North Dakota flirted with the #1 ranking after winning the Badger Showdown. A couple of weeks later, however, Wisconsin got its revenge by sweeping the Fighting Sioux and establishing themselves atop the conference standings. UND could little afford to lose any of its remaining games if it wanted to continue as the regular season WCHA champion. A split with Minnesota the very next weekend put them in a precarious position while a near sweep at the hands of St. Cloud State all but ended their chances at a 4th-consecutive conference championship.

=== Finishing strong ===
North Dakota righted the ship in February and rounded out the final four weeks of the regular season without a loss. In the team's 5–0 win over Michigan Tech, Karl Goehring set a new program record with his 5th shutout of the season. When the team entered the postseason, he had pushed the mark up to 6 and was one of the top goaltenders in the nation. Both he and Jeff Panzer were named as First Team All-Americans and UND entered the conference playoffs as the #2 team in the nation.

=== WCHA tournament ===
North Dakota began their postseason run at home against Denver and, though their offense faltered in the second game, the Fighting Sioux were too much for the Pioneers to handle. Before the next round began, however, Goehring was diagnosed with a concussion and the team had to rely on Andy Kollar to take them the rest of the way. The sophomore held the fort and allowed North Dakota's offense to carry the team to victory, including a win over top-ranked Wisconsin in the WCHA championship game.

=== NCAA tournament ===
North Dakota moved up to #2 in the polls but still remained behind Wisconsin. While that left the team as the #2 western seed, it did provide UND with a buy into the second round of the tournament. While Goehring was still sidelined, North Dakota received a gift when the lowest-seeded team, Niagara, pulled off an upset in the first round. UND dominated in the first and third periods to end their postseason losing streak and propel themselves into the Frozen Four.

Despite Kollar's performance in Goehring's absence, as soon as their primary starter was cleared to play, head coach Dean Blais put Goehring back in net. Any worries about the move were banished in the national semifinal when Goehring earned his 8th shutout of the season, defeating defending champion Maine in the process. The win sent UND to the championship game with just Boston College remaining in their way. The two teams were evenly matched in the first period, with both scoring 1 goal on 13 shots. BC got a lead in the second period but afterwards the team started playing a more defensive style. Lee Goren tied the game early in the third period and both teams struggled to find chances thereafter. with less than 6 minutes left in regulation, Goren assisted on Jason Ulmer's go-ahead marker and then potted an empty net goal to seal the match and give North Dakota its seventh national championship.

== Departures ==
Player	Position	Nationality	Cause
Jason Blake	Forward	United States	Graduation (signed with Los Angeles Kings)
Jesse Bull	Forward	United States	Graduation (signed with Lubbock Cotton Kings)
Adam Calder	Forward	Canada	Graduation (signed with Rochester Americans)
David Hoogsteen	Forward	Canada	Graduation (signed with Straubing Tigers)
Jay Panzer	Forward	United States	Graduation (signed with Greenville Grrrowl)
Tom Philion	Forward	United States	Graduation (retired)
Jeff Ulmer	Defenseman	Canada	Graduation (joined Team Canada)
Jason Price	Defenseman	United States	Left program (signed with Tucson Gila Monsters)
Brad Williamson	Forward	Canada	Graduation (Signed with Cincinnati Cyclones)

== Recruiting ==
Player	Position	Nationality	Age	Notes
Ryan Bayda	Forward	Canada	18	Saskatoon, SK
Jason Endres	Goaltender	United States	22	Grand Forks, ND
Ryan Hale	Forward	United States	20	Colorado Springs, CO
Adrian Hasbargen	Defenseman	United States	20	Warroad, MN; transfer from Alaska–Anchorage
Chris Leinweber	Defenseman	Canada	17	Calgary, AB
Jason Notermann	Forward	United States	20	Rochester, MN
Tim Skarperud	Forward	United States	21	Grand Forks, ND
Ryan Sofie	Goaltender	United States	20	Baxter, MN
Kevin Spiewak	Forward	United States	20	Schaumburg, IL
Jeff Yurecko	Forward	United States	19	Edina, MN

== Roster ==
No.	Nat.	Player	Class	Pos	Height	Weight	DoB	Hometown	Previous team	NHL rights
		Ryan Sofie	Freshman	G	5' 7" (1.7 m)	134 lb (61 kg)	1979-06-04	Baxter, Minnesota	Flagstaff Mountaineers (WSHL)	—
1		Karl Goehring	Junior	G	5' 8" (1.73 m)	159 lb (72 kg)	1978-08-23	Apple Valley, Minnesota	Fargo-Moorhead Ice Sharks (USHL)	—
3		Trevor Hammer	Junior	D	6' 0" (1.83 m)	181 lb (82 kg)	1978-09-23	Roseau, Minnesota	Roseau High School (MN-HS)	—
4		Lee Goren (A)	Senior	F	6' 3" (1.91 m)	207 lb (94 kg)	1977-12-26	Winnipeg, Manitoba	Minot Top Guns (SJHL)	BOS, 63rd overall 1997
5		Chris Leinweber	Freshman	D	5' 11" (1.8 m)	183 lb (83 kg)	1981-11-02	Calgary, Alberta	Calgary Canucks (AJHL)	—
6		Tim O'Connell	Senior	D	6' 4" (1.93 m)	210 lb (95 kg)	1977-10-26	Grand Forks, North Dakota	Fargo-Moorhead Bears (USHL)	—
7		Travis Roche	Freshman (RS)	D	6' 1" (1.85 m)	194 lb (88 kg)	1978-06-17	Grande Cache, Alberta	Trail Smoke Eaters (BCHL)	—
8		Mike Commodore	Junior	D	6' 4" (1.93 m)	231 lb (105 kg)	1979-11-07	Fort Saskatchewan, Alberta	Fort Saskatchewan Traders (AJHL)	NJD, 42nd overall 1999
9		Jason Ulmer (A)	Senior	F	5' 10" (1.78 m)	185 lb (84 kg)	1978-12-20	Wilcox, Saskatchewan	Notre Dame Hounds (SJHL)	—
10		Bryan Lundbohm	Sophomore	F	5' 10" (1.78 m)	185 lb (84 kg)	1977-08-24	Roseau, Minnesota	Lincoln Stars (USHL)	—
11		Peter Armbrust (C)	Senior	F	5' 11" (1.8 m)	195 lb (88 kg)	1977-12-03	Edina, Minnesota	Edina High School (MN-HS)	—
14		Adrian Hasbargen	Freshman	F	5' 10" (1.78 m)	187 lb (85 kg)	1979-07-14	Warroad, Minnesota	Lincoln Stars (USHL)	—
16		Kevin Spiewak	Freshman	F	5' 10" (1.78 m)	181 lb (82 kg)	1979-05-03	Schaumburg, Illinois	Omaha Lancers (USHL)	—
17		Jeff Panzer	Junior	F	5' 7" (1.7 m)	159 lb (72 kg)	1978-04-07	Grand Forks, North Dakota	Fargo-Moorhead Ice Sharks (USHL)	—
18		Tim Skarperud	Freshman	F	5' 11" (1.8 m)	181 lb (82 kg)	1978-02-06	Grand Forks, North Dakota	Sioux City Musketeers (USHL)	—
19		Ryan Bayda	Freshman	F	5' 11" (1.8 m)	185 lb (84 kg)	1980-12-09	Saskatoon, Saskatchewan	Vernon Vipers (BCHL)	—
20		Wes Dorey	Junior	F	5' 10" (1.78 m)	174 lb (79 kg)	1976-08-31	Edmonton, Alberta	Weyburn Red Wings (SJHL)	—
21		Jeff Yurecko	Freshman	F	6' 2" (1.88 m)	194 lb (88 kg)	1980-08-24	Edina, Minnesota	Edina High School (MN-HS)	—
22		Pat Kenny	Sophomore	F	6' 1" (1.85 m)	185 lb (84 kg)	1977-07-08	Edmonton, Alberta	Quesnel Millionaires (BCHL)	—
23		Aaron Schneekloth	Sophomore	D	5' 11" (1.8 m)	185 lb (84 kg)	1978-07-15	Calgary, Alberta	South Surrey Eagles (BCHL)	—
24		Brad DeFauw	Senior	F	6' 2" (1.88 m)	225 lb (102 kg)	1977-11-10	Edina, Minnesota	Apple Valley High School (USHS-MN)	—
25		Ryan Hale	Freshman	F	6' 2" (1.88 m)	198 lb (90 kg)	1978-11-07	Colorado Springs, Colorado	Waterloo Black Hawks (USHL)	—
26		Jason Notermann	Freshman	F	5' 9" (1.75 m)	176 lb (80 kg)	1978-12-02	Rochester, Minnesota	Green Bay Gamblers (USHL)	—
27		Chad Mazurak	Sophomore	F	5' 10" (1.78 m)	170 lb (77 kg)	1978-04-18	Winnipeg, Manitoba	Lincoln Stars (USHL)	—
28		Paul Murphy	Sophomore	D	5' 10" (1.78 m)	181 lb (82 kg)	1977-08-08	Manvel, North Dakota	North Iowa Huskies (USHL)	—
29		Mike Possin	Sophomore	F	6' 2" (1.88 m)	187 lb (85 kg)	1977-06-19	St. Cloud, Minnesota	Twin City Vulcans (USHL)	—
30		Jason Endres	Freshman	G	5' 8" (1.73 m)	146 lb (66 kg)	1977-04-19	Grand Forks, North Dakota	Fargo-Moorhead Ice Sharks (USHL)	—
35		Andy Kollar	Sophomore	G	5' 11" (1.8 m)	141 lb (64 kg)	1977-04-16	Winnipeg, Manitoba	Fargo-Moorhead Ice Sharks (USHL)	—

== Standings ==
1999–00 Western Collegiate Hockey Association standings
	Conference							Overall					
	GP	W	L	T	PTS	GF	GA	GP	W	L	T	GF	GA
#5 Wisconsin†	28	23	5	0	46	112	70	41	31	9	1	166	109
#1 North Dakota*	28	17	6	5	39	113	61	44	31	8	5	192	97
#12 St. Cloud State	28	16	9	3	35	105	66	40	23	14	3	156	103
#15 Minnesota State-Mankato	28	15	10	3	33	90	82	39	21	14	4	126	117
Colorado College	28	14	11	3	31	88	69	39	18	18	3	126	102
#14 Minnesota	28	13	13	2	28	95	84	41	20	19	2	148	133
Alaska-Anchorage	28	11	14	3	25	65	87	36	15	18	3	85	104
Minnesota-Duluth	28	10	18	0	20	59	114	37	15	22	0	93	146
Denver	28	9	18	1	19	92	97	41	16	23	2	132	136
Michigan Tech	28	2	26	0	4	47	136	38	4	34	0	68	183
Championship: North Dakota † indicates conference regular season champion * indicates conference tournament champion Final rankings: USA Today/American Hockey Magazine Poll Top 15 Poll

== Schedule and results ==
Date	Time	Opponent^{#}	Rank^{#}	Site	TV	Decision	Result	Attendance	Record
Exhibition
October 15	7:05 PM	vs. Team Canada*	#4	Ralph Engelstad Arena • Grand Forks, North Dakota (Exhibition)			W 6–1		
October 19	7:05 PM	vs. Manitoba*	#4	Ralph Engelstad Arena • Grand Forks, North Dakota (Exhibition)			W 6–4		
Regular season
October 22	7:05 PM	at Minnesota	#4	Mariucci Arena • Minneapolis, Minnesota		Goehring	T 2–2 ^{OT}	9,855	0–0–1 (0–0–1)
October 23	7:05 PM	at Minnesota	#4	Mariucci Arena • Minneapolis, Minnesota		Goehring	W 3–2	9,827	1–0–1 (1–0–1)
October 29	6:30 PM	at #7 Clarkson*	#3	Cheel Arena • Potsdam, New York		Goehring	W 4–1	3,123	2–0–1
October 30	6:30 PM	at #7 Clarkson*	#3	Cheel Arena • Potsdam, New York		Kollar	W 6–5	3,036	3–0–1
November 5	7:35 PM	vs. St. Cloud State	#2	Ralph Engelstad Arena • Grand Forks, North Dakota		Goehring	W 6–0	5,451	4–0–1 (2–0–1)
November 6	7:35 PM	vs. St. Cloud State	#2	Ralph Engelstad Arena • Grand Forks, North Dakota		Goehring	W 4–3	5,114	5–0–1 (3–0–1)
November 12	10:35 PM	at Alaska–Anchorage	#1	Sullivan Arena • Anchorage, Alaska		Goehring	W 7–1	4,497	6–0–1 (4–0–1)
November 13	10:35 PM	at Alaska–Anchorage	#1	Sullivan Arena • Anchorage, Alaska		Goehring	W 3–0	4,386	7–0–1 (5–0–1)
November 19	7:35 PM	vs. Minnesota State–Mankato	#1	Ralph Engelstad Arena • Grand Forks, North Dakota		Goehring	W 5–1	5,478	8–0–1 (6–0–1)
November 20	7:35 PM	vs. Minnesota State–Mankato	#1	Ralph Engelstad Arena • Grand Forks, North Dakota		Goehring	L 5–6	5,392	8–1–1 (6–1–1)
UNH Tournament
November 27	1:00 PM	vs. Vermont*	#2	Whittemore Center • Durham, New Hampshire (UNH Tournament semifinal)		Kollar	W 8–0	600	9–1–1
November 28	4:00 PM	vs. #8 New Hampshire*	#2	Whittemore Center • Durham, New Hampshire (UNH Tournament championship)		Goehring	L 2–6	6,266	9–2–1
December 3	7:05 PM	at Minnesota–Duluth	#2	Duluth Entertainment Convention Center • Duluth, Minnesota		Kollar	W 6–3	4,859	10–2–1 (7–1–1)
December 4	7:05 PM	at Minnesota–Duluth	#2	Duluth Entertainment Convention Center • Duluth, Minnesota		Kollar	W 5–4	4,923	11–2–1 (8–1–1)
December 10	7:35 PM	vs. Denver	#1	Ralph Engelstad Arena • Grand Forks, North Dakota		Kollar	W 5–4	5,218	12–2–1 (9–1–1)
December 11	7:35 PM	vs. Denver	#1	Ralph Engelstad Arena • Grand Forks, North Dakota		Kollar	L 2–7	5,639	12–3–1 (9–2–1)
Badger Showdown
December 27	5:05 PM	vs. Miami*	#2	Bradley Center • Milwaukee, Wisconsin (Badger Showdown semifinal)		Goehring	W 5–2	10,144	13–3–1
December 28	8:05 PM	vs. #4 Wisconsin*	#2	Bradley Center • Milwaukee, Wisconsin (Badger Showdown championship)		Kollar	W 3–2 ^{OT}	11,251	14–3–1
January 7	7:35 PM	vs. Colorado College	#2	Ralph Engelstad Arena • Grand Forks, North Dakota		Goehring	T 1–1 ^{OT}	6,067	14–3–2 (9–2–2)
January 8	7:35 PM	vs. Colorado College	#2	Ralph Engelstad Arena • Grand Forks, North Dakota		Goehring	W 4–0 ^{OT}	6,067	15–3–2 (10–2–2)
January 14	7:05 PM	at #4 Wisconsin	#2	Kohl Center • Madison, Wisconsin		Goehring	L 2–3 ^{OT}	14,242	15–4–2 (10–3–2)
January 15	7:05 PM	at #4 Wisconsin	#2	Kohl Center • Madison, Wisconsin		Kollar	L 5–6 ^{OT}	15,237	15–5–2 (10–4–2)
January 21	7:35 PM	vs. Minnesota	#3	Ralph Engelstad Arena • Grand Forks, North Dakota		Goehring	W 1–0	6,067	16–5–2 (11–4–2)
January 22	7:35 PM	vs. Minnesota	#3	Ralph Engelstad Arena • Grand Forks, North Dakota		Goehring	L 2–5	6,067	16–6–2 (11–5–2)
January 28	6:35 PM	at Michigan Tech	#4	MacInnes Student Ice Arena • Houghton, Michigan		Goehring	W 5–0	1,749	17–6–2 (12–5–2)
January 29	6:05 PM	at Michigan Tech	#4	MacInnes Student Ice Arena • Houghton, Michigan		Kollar	W 11–1	2,222	18–6–2 (13–5–2)
February 4	7:35 PM	at St. Cloud State	#2	National Hockey Center • St. Cloud, Minnesota		Goehring	L 0–3	6,651	18–7–2 (13–6–2)
February 5	7:35 PM	at St. Cloud State	#2	National Hockey Center • St. Cloud, Minnesota		Goehring	T 1–1 ^{OT}	7,041	18–7–3 (13–6–3)
February 11	7:35 PM	vs. Alaska–Anchorage	#4	Ralph Engelstad Arena • Grand Forks, North Dakota		Goehring	W 2–1	6,067	19–7–3 (14–6–3)
February 12	7:35 PM	vs. Alaska–Anchorage	#4	Ralph Engelstad Arena • Grand Forks, North Dakota		Goehring	W 6–3	6,067	20–7–3 (15–6–3)
February 18	8:35 PM	vs. Minnesota–Duluth	#3	Ralph Engelstad Arena • Grand Forks, North Dakota		Goehring	W 10–0	6,067	21–7–3 (16–6–3)
February 19	7:35 PM	vs. Minnesota–Duluth	#3	Ralph Engelstad Arena • Grand Forks, North Dakota		Kollar	W 4–1	6,067	22–7–3 (17–6–3)
February 25	7:35 PM	vs. Minnesota State–Mankato	#2	Midwest Wireless Civic Center • Mankato, Minnesota		Goehring	T 3–3 ^{OT}	4,931	22–7–4 (17–6–4)
February 26	7:35 PM	vs. Minnesota State–Mankato	#2	Midwest Wireless Civic Center • Mankato, Minnesota		Kollar	T 1–1 ^{OT}	5,144	22–7–5 (17–6–5)
March 3	7:35 PM	vs. Bemidji State*	#3	Ralph Engelstad Arena • Grand Forks, North Dakota		Goehring	W 9–2	6,067	23–7–5
March 4	8:35 PM	vs. Bemidji State*	#3	Ralph Engelstad Arena • Grand Forks, North Dakota		Endres	W 6–3	6,067	24–7–5
WCHA Tournament
March 10	7:35 PM	vs. Denver*	#2	Ralph Engelstad Arena • Grand Forks, North Dakota (WCHA first round game 1)		Goehring	W 4–0	3,161	25–7–5
March 11	7:35 PM	vs. Denver*	#2	Ralph Engelstad Arena • Grand Forks, North Dakota (WCHA first round game 2)		Goehring	L 1–2	4,034	25–8–5
March 12	7:35 PM	vs. Denver*	#2	Ralph Engelstad Arena • Grand Forks, North Dakota (WCHA first round game 3)		Goehring	W 9–4	3,934	26–8–5
North Dakota Won Series 2-1
March 17	2:05 PM	vs. St. Cloud State*	#3	Target Center • Minneapolis, Minnesota (WCHA semifinal)		Kollar	W 7–3	8,397	27–8–5
March 18	7:05 PM	vs. #1 Wisconsin*	#3	Target Center • Minneapolis, Minnesota (WCHA championship)		Kollar	W 5–3	10,437	28–8–5
NCAA Tournament
March 25	5:00 PM	vs. Niagara*	#2	Mariucci Arena • Minneapolis, Minnesota (NCAA West Regional semifinal)		Kollar	W 4–1	9,468	29–8–5
April 6	1:00 PM	vs. #3 Maine*	#2	Providence Civic Center • Providence, Rhode Island (NCAA National semifinal)		Goehring	W 2–0	11,484	30–8–5
April 8	6:30 PM	vs. #6 Boston College*	#2	Providence Civic Center • Providence, Rhode Island (NCAA National championship)	ESPN	Goehring	W 4–2	11,484	31–8–5
*Non-conference game. ^{#}Rankings from USCHO.com Poll. All times are in Central Time.

== 2000 national championship ==
April 8	North Dakota	4 – 2	Boston College	Providence Civic Center	Recap

Scoring summary
Period	Team	Goal	Assist(s)	Time	Score
1st	UND	Mike Commodore (5)	Lundbohm and Skarperud	3:48	1–0 UND
1st	BC	Jeff Farkas (32) – PP	Bellefeuille and Gionta	16:47	1–1
2nd	BC	Marty Hughes (5)	Gionta	26:59	2–1 BC
3rd	UND	Lee Goren (33)	Bayda	42:43	2–2
3rd	UND	Jason Ulmer (18) – GW	Goren	54:22	3–2 UND
3rd	UND	Lee Goren (34) – EN	unassisted	59:14	4–2 UND
Penalty summary
Period	Team	Player	Penalty	Time	PIM
1st	UND	Aaron Schneekloth	Cross-Checking	6:32	2:00
1st	BC	Jeff Giuliano	Hooking	10:02	2:00
1st	UND	Ryan Bayda	Slashing	11:35	2:00
1st	UND	Chad Mazurak	High-Sticking	16:28	2:00
1st	BC	Jeff Giuliano	Hooking	17:13	2:00
2nd	UND	Chad Mazurak	Holding	20:25	2:00
2nd	UND	Tim O'Connell	Slashing	23:04	2:00
2nd	BC	BENCH	Too Many Men	24:21	2:00
2nd	UND	Mike Commodore	Holding	30:45	2:00
2nd	BC	Ales Dolinar	Slashing	30:45	2:00
2nd	UND	Mike Commodore	Tripping	34:26	2:00

Shots by period
Team	1	2	3	T
Boston College	13	6	4	23
North Dakota	13	12	11	36

Goaltenders
Team	Name	Saves	Goals against	Time on ice
BC	Scott Clemmensen	32	3	58:47
UND	Karl Goehring	21	2	60:00

== Scoring statistics ==
Name	Position	Games	Goals	Assists	Points	PIM
Lee Goren	RW	44	34	29	63	42
Jeff Panzer	C	44	19	44	63	16
Jason Ulmer	C/LW	44	18	39	57	33
Bryan Lundbohm	C	44	22	22	44	14
Ryan Bayda	C/LW	44	17	23	40	30
Wes Dorey	C	39	15	13	28	16
Travis Roche	D	42	6	22	28	60
Brad DeFauw	LW	43	13	9	22	52
Tim Skarperud	F	37	11	10	21	16
Aaron Schneekloth	D	34	3	14	17	24
Kevin Spiewak	F	38	8	8	16	26
Jason Notermann	F	39	7	9	16	33
Chad Mazurak	D	25	5	10	15	22
Ryan Hale	RW	40	4	11	15	20
Mike Commodore	D	38	5	7	12	154
Trevor Hammer	D	32	2	10	12	14
Peter Armbrust	RW	43	1	10	11	33
Tim O'Connell	D	38	0	9	9	52
Chris Leinweber	D	36	0	8	8	16
Paul Murphy	D	15	0	7	7	4
Jeff Yurecko	F	14	2	1	3	8
Adrian Hasbargen	D	7	0	2	2	4
Karl Goehring	G	30	0	2	2	2
Andy Kollar	G	15	0	1	1	4
Jason Endres	G	2	0	0	0	0
Pat Kenny	F	4	0	0	0	0
Mike Possin	F	7	0	0	0	8
Bench	-	-	-	-	-	4
Total			192	320	512	707

== Goaltending statistics ==
Name	Games	Minutes	Wins	Losses	Ties	Goals against	Saves	Shut outs	SV %	GAA
Jason Endres	2	69	1	0	0	2	13	0	.867	1.74
Karl Goehring	30	1747	19	6	4	55	697	8	.927	1.89
Andy Kollar	15	856	11	2	1	38	380	1	.909	2.66
Empty Net	-	6	-	-	-	2	-	-	-	-
Total	44	2678	31	8	5	97	1090	9	.918	2.17

== Rankings ==
Poll	Week																							
Poll	Pre	1	2	3	4	5	6	7	8	9	10	11	12	13	14	15	16	17	18	19	20	21	22	23 (Final)
USCHO.com	4	4	3	2	1	1	2	2	1	2	2	2	2	3	4	2	4	3	2	3	2	3	2	N/A
USA Today	-	-	5	2	1	1	2	2	1	-	-	2	2	3	-	3	4	3	2	3	-	-	-	1

USCHO did not release a poll in week 23.

== Awards and honors ==
Player	Award	Ref
Lee Goren	NCAA Tournament Most Outstanding Player	
Karl Goehring	AHCA West First Team All-American	
Jeff Panzer	AHCA West First Team All-American	
Lee Goren	AHCA West Second Team All-American	
Karl Goehring	NCAA All-Tournament Team	
Mike Commodore	NCAA All-Tournament Team	
Lee Goren	NCAA All-Tournament Team	
Bryan Lundbohm	NCAA All-Tournament Team	
Lee Goren	WCHA Tournament MVP	
Karl Goehring	All-WCHA First Team	
Jeff Panzer	All-WCHA First Team	
Lee Goren	All-WCHA Second Team	
Jason Ulmer	All-WCHA Third Team	
Travis Roche	WCHA All-Rookie Team	
Ryan Bayda	WCHA All-Rookie Team	
Andy Kollar	WCHA All-Tournament Team	
Travis Roche	WCHA All-Tournament Team	
Ryan Bayda	WCHA All-Tournament Team	
Lee Goren	WCHA All-Tournament Team	

== Players drafted into the NHL ==
=== 2000 NHL entry draft ===
= NHL All-Star team	= NHL All-Star	= NHL All-Star and NHL All-Star team	= Did not play in the NHL

Round	Pick	Player	NHL team
1	22	David Hale ^{†}	New Jersey Devils
3	80	Ryan Bayda	Carolina Hurricanes
4	122	Derrick Byfuglien ^{†}	Ottawa Senators

† incoming freshman
