= 2000 WCHA men's ice hockey tournament =

2000 WCHA Men's ice hockey tournament
- Dates: March 10–18, 2000
- Teams: 10
- Finals site: Target Center; Minneapolis, Minnesota
- Champions: North Dakota (7th title)
- Winning coach: Dean Blais (2nd title)
- MVP: Lee Goren (North Dakota)
- Attendance: 49,717
- WCHA Men's Ice Hockey Tournaments

The 2000 WCHA Men's Ice Hockey Tournament was the 41st conference playoff in league history and 47th season where a WCHA champion was crowned. The 2000 tournament played between March 10 and March 18, 2000 at five conference arenas and the Target Center in Minneapolis, Minnesota. By winning the tournament, North Dakota was awarded the Broadmoor Trophy and received the Western Collegiate Hockey Association's automatic bid to the 2000 NCAA Men's Division I Ice Hockey Tournament.

== Format ==
The first round of the postseason tournament featured a best-of-three games format. All ten conference schools participated in the tournament with teams seeded No. 1 through No. 10 according to their final conference standing, with a tiebreaker system used to seed teams with an identical number of points accumulated. The top five seeded teams each earned home ice and hosted one of the lower seeded teams.

The winners of the first round series advanced to the Target Center for the WCHA Final Five, the collective name for the quarterfinal, semifinal, and championship rounds. The Final Five uses a single-elimination format. Teams were re-seeded No. 1 through No. 5 according to the final regular season conference standings, with the top three teams automatically advancing to the semifinals.

=== Conference standings ===
Note: GP = Games played; W = Wins; L = Losses; T = Ties; PTS = Points; GF = Goals For; GA = Goals Against

1999–00 Western Collegiate Hockey Association standings
	Conference							Overall					
	GP	W	L	T	PTS	GF	GA	GP	W	L	T	GF	GA
#5 Wisconsin†	28	23	5	0	46	112	70	41	31	9	1	166	109
#1 North Dakota*	28	17	6	5	39	113	61	44	31	8	5	192	97
#12 St. Cloud State	28	16	9	3	35	105	66	40	23	14	3	156	103
#15 Minnesota State-Mankato	28	15	10	3	33	90	82	39	21	14	4	126	117
Colorado College	28	14	11	3	31	88	69	39	18	18	3	126	102
#14 Minnesota	28	13	13	2	28	95	84	41	20	19	2	148	133
Alaska-Anchorage	28	11	14	3	25	65	87	36	15	18	3	85	104
Minnesota-Duluth	28	10	18	0	20	59	114	37	15	22	0	93	146
Denver	28	9	18	1	19	92	97	41	16	23	2	132	136
Michigan Tech	28	2	26	0	4	47	136	38	4	34	0	68	183
Championship: North Dakota † indicates conference regular season champion * indicates conference tournament champion Final rankings: USA Today/American Hockey Magazine Poll Top 15 Poll

== Bracket ==
Teams are reseeded after the first round

First round March 10–12, 2000
1	Wisconsin	4	9	–
10	Michigan Tech	0	4	–
2	North Dakota	4	1	9
9	Denver	0	2	4
3	St. Cloud State	4	3	7
8	Minnesota-Duluth	5	0	3
4	Minnesota State-Mankato	2*	3	—
7	Alaska-Anchorage	1	2	—
5	Colorado College	2	2	—
6	Minnesota	4	3*	—

Quarterfinal; March 16, 2000
4	Minnesota State-Mankato	4
6	Minnesota	6

Semifinals; March 17, 2000
1	Wisconsin	5
6	Minnesota	3
2	North Dakota	7
3	St. Cloud State	3

Championship; March 18, 2000
1	Wisconsin	3
2	North Dakota	5

Note: * denotes overtime period(s)

=== Quarterfinals ===
==== (1) Wisconsin vs. (10) Michigan Tech ====
March 10	Wisconsin	4 – 0	Michigan Tech	Kohl Center
Dustin Kuk - GW PP - 08:41		First period	No scoring
Steven Reinprecht - 05:52; Dany Heatley - PP - 16:41; Kent Davyduke - 17:07		Second period	No scoring
No scoring		Third period	No scoring
Graham Melanson ( 15 saves / 15 shots )		Goalie stats	Brian Rogers ( 29 saves / 33 shots )

March 11	Wisconsin	9 – 4	Michigan Tech	Kohl Center
Niki Siren - 07:56; Dave Hergert - 08:31; Alex Brooks - 14:18; Kevin Granato - 17:25		First period	13:01 - Devin Hartnell; 19:28 - PP - Riley Nelson
Brad Winchester - GW PP - 06:06; Andy Wheeler - SH - 10:36; Dustin Kuk - 15:32		Second period	No scoring
Dave Hergert - PP - 12:21; Steven Reinprecht - 13:21		Third period	14:13 - Mat Snesrud; 19:04 - Jarrett Weinberger
Graham Melanson ( 18 saves / 20 shots ) / Scott Kabotoff ( 4 saves / 5 shots ) / Mark Baranczyk ( 0 saves / 1 shots )		Goalie stats	Brian Rogers ( 7 saves / 11 shots ) / Jason Moilanen ( 22 saves / 27 shots )

Wisconsin won series 2–0

==== (2) North Dakota vs. (9) Denver ====
March 10	North Dakota	4 – 0	Denver	Ralph Engelstad Arena
No Scoring		First period	No scoring
Mike Commodore - GW PP - 18:17		Second period	No scoring
Tim Skarperud - 05:07; Wes Dorey - 12:26; Jason Noterman - EN - 19:55		Third period	No scoring
Karl Goehring ( 29 saves / 29 shots )		Goalie stats	Stephen Wagner ( 28 saves / 31 shots )

March 11	North Dakota	1 – 2	Denver	Ralph Engelstad Arena
Kevin Spiewak - 14:58		First period	No scoring
No scoring		Second period	11:10 - PP - Joseph Casey; 03:01 - GW - Kelly Popadynetz
No scoring		Third period	No scoring
Karl Goehring ( 32 saves / 34 shots )		Goalie stats	Stephen Wagner ( 27 saves / 28 shots )

March 12	North Dakota	9 – 4	Denver	Ralph Engelstad Arena
Lee Goren - 03:49; Chad Mazurak - PP - 04:33		First period	02:49 - Bjorn Engstrom; 19:59 - SH - Joseph Casey
Ryan Bayda - 00:41; Jason Ulmer - PP - 04:33; Jason Ulmer - GW - 08:36; Kevin Spiewak - 15:16		Second period	No scoring
Brad Defauw - 01:03; Jason Ulmer - SH - 06:37; Lee Goren - 11:26		Third period	02:19 - PP - Joseph Casey; 03:24 - PP - Mark Rycroft
Karl Goehring ( 27 saves / 31 shots )		Goalie stats	Stephen Wagner ( 20 saves / 29 shots ) / Wade Dubielewicz ( 3 saves / 3 shots )

North Dakota won series 2–1

==== (3) St. Cloud State vs. (8) Minnesota-Duluth ====
March 10	St. Cloud State	4 – 5	Minnesota-Duluth	National Hockey Center
Keith Anderson - 00:42; Mike Walsh - 04:12; Tyler Arnason - PP - 18:29		First period	09:15 - Rich Anderson
Nate DiCasmirro - PP - 11:46		Second period	04:14 - Tom Nelson; 09:39 - PP - Pasi Korhonen
No scoring		Third period	07:13 - Mark Gunderson; 16:39 - GW - Jon Francisco
Scott Meyer ( 24 saves / 29 shots )		Goalie stats	Brant Nicklin ( 39 saves / 43 shots )

March 11	St. Cloud State	3 – 0	Minnesota-Duluth	National Hockey Center
No Scoring		First period	No scoring
No scoring		Second period	No scoring
Tyler Arnason - GW - 12:04; Nate DiCasmirro - 15:18; Ryan Malone - 19:32		Third period	No scoring
Scott Meyer ( 23 saves / 23 shots )		Goalie stats	Brant Nicklin ( 38 saves / 41 shots )

March 12	St. Cloud State	7 – 3	Minnesota-Duluth	National Hockey Center
Nate DiCasmirro - PP - 14:09		First period	05:14 - PP - Ryan Homstol; 08:15 - SH - Jeff Scissons
Geno Parrish - PP - 07:52; Brandon Sampair - 12:44		Second period	05:12 - Drew Otten
Nate DiCasmirro - GW - 00:45; Tyler Arnason - 12:42; Mark Hartigan - 14:25; Mark Hartigan - EN - 19:32		Third period	No scoring
Scott Meyer ( 31 saves / 34 shots )		Goalie stats	Brant Nicklin ( 20 saves / 23 shots ) / Rob Anderson ( 10 saves / 13 shots )

St. Cloud State won series 2–1

==== (4) Minnesota State-Mankato vs. (7) Alaska-Anchorage ====
March 10	Minnesota State-Mankato	2 – 1	OT	Alaska-Anchorage	Verizon Wireless Center

March 11	Minnesota State-Mankato	3 – 2	Alaska-Anchorage	Verizon Wireless Center

Minnesota State won series 2–0

==== (5) Colorado College vs. (6) Minnesota ====
March 10	Colorado College	2 – 4	Minnesota	Colorado Springs World Arena
No Scoring		First period	No scoring
No scoring		Second period	10:55 - Erik Wendell; 13:20 - PP - Erik Westrum
Aaron Karpan - 01:59; Jesse Heerema - PP - 12:18		Third period	11:42 - GW SH - Nate Miller; 19:41 - Matt DeMarchi
Colin Zulianello ( 28 saves / 31 shots )		Goalie stats	Adam Hauser ( 26 saves / 28 shots )

March 11	Colorado College	2 – 3	OT	Minnesota	Colorado Springs World Arena
No Scoring		First period		No scoring
Trent Clark - SH - 19:33		Second period		No scoring
Tom Preissing - PP - 17:16		Third period		13:13 - Mark Nenovich; 19:51 - EA - Erik Westrum
No scoring		First overtime period		07:34 - GW - Stuart Senden
Jeff Sanger ( 27 saves / 30 shots )		Goalie stats		Adam Hauser ( 28 saves / 30 shots )

Minnesota won series 2–0

=== Quarterfinal ===
==== (4) Minnesota State-Mankato vs. (6) Minnesota ====
March 16	Minnesota State-Mankato	4 – 6	Minnesota	Target Center

=== Semifinals ===
==== (1) Wisconsin vs. (6) Minnesota ====
March 17	Wisconsin	5 – 3	Minnesota	Target Center
Dan Bjornlie - 05:20; Matt Hussey - 09:06; Dany Heatley - PP - 13:32		First period	11:46 - Erik Westrum; 19:47 - John Pohl
Matt Murray - GW - 06:24		Second period	No scoring
Steven Reinprecht - EN - 19:24		Third period	07:35 - PP - Jordan Leopold
Graham Melanson ( 38 saves / 41 shots )		Goalie stats	Adam Hauser ( 14 saves / 18 shots ) / Pete Samargia ( 10 saves / 10 shots )

==== (2) North Dakota vs. (3) St. Cloud State ====
March 17	North Dakota	7 – 3	St. Cloud State	Target Center
Chad Mazurak - 00:40		First period	04:37 - Lee Brooks
Lee Goren - 01:01; Travis Roche - 08:48		Second period	11:21 - PP - Joe Motzko
Lee Goren - GW PP - 04:12; Bryan Lundbohm - 05:19; Tim Skarperud - 13:43; Jason Noterman - SH - 18:26		Third period	15:18 - Matt Bailey
Andy Kollar ( 27 saves / 30 shots )		Goalie stats	Scott Meyer ( 22 saves / 29 shots )

=== Third Place ===
==== (3) St. Cloud State vs. (6) Minnesota ====
March 18	St. Cloud State	6 – 4	Minnesota	Target Center
Brian Gaffaney - 10:38; Mike Pudlick - PP - 15:22; Mark Hartigan - 18:33		First period	08:02 - PP - Jordan Leopold
Geno Parrish - PP - 17:18		Second period	05:51 - PP - Nate Miller
Joe Motzko - GW - 08:30; Mark Hartigan - EN - 19:39		Third period	03:17 - Aaron Miskovich; 15:40 - PP - Nate Miller
Scott Meyer ( 24 saves / 28 shots )		Goalie stats	Adam Hauser ( 28 saves / 33 shots )

=== Championship ===
==== (1) Wisconsin vs. (2) North Dakota ====
March 18	Wisconsin	3 – 5	North Dakota	Target Center
David Hukalo - 06:56		First period	01:35 - Jeff Panzer; 07:26 - Ryan Bayda
Dustin Kuk - 00:49		Second period	02:58 - PP - Lee Goren
Steven Reinprecht - 16:16		Third period	01:02 - GW - Lee Goren; 05:55 - PP - Chad Mazurak
Graham Melanson ( 26 saves / 31 shots )		Goalie stats	Andy Kollar ( 33 saves / 36 shots )

== Tournament awards ==
=== All-Tournament Team ===
- F Brandon Sampair (St. Cloud State)
- F Ryan Bayda (North Dakota)
- F Lee Goren* (North Dakota)
- D Dan Bjornlie (Wisconsin)
- D Travis Roche (North Dakota)
- G Andy Kollar (North Dakota)

* Most Valuable Player(s)

== See also ==
- Western Collegiate Hockey Association men's champions
