= 2000 NCAA Division I men's ice hockey tournament =

- 2000 Frozen Four logo
- Teams: 12
- Finals site: Providence Civic Center, Providence, Rhode Island
- Champions: North Dakota Fighting Sioux (7th title)
- Runner-up: Boston College Eagles (5th title game)
- Semifinalists: Maine Black Bears (7th Frozen Four); St. Lawrence Saints (9th Frozen Four)
- Winning coach: Dean Blais (2nd title)
- MOP: Lee Goren (North Dakota)
- Attendance: 69,421

The 2000 NCAA Division I men's ice hockey tournament involved 12 schools playing in single-elimination play to determine the national champion of men's NCAA Division I college ice hockey. This was the first time in which the Frozen Four was held two weeks after the regional rounds.

The final event was played at Providence Civic Center, Providence, Rhode Island. North Dakota, coached by Dean Blais, defeated Boston College, coached by Jerry York, by a 4-2 score on April 8. BC, seeking its first NCAA title since 1949, had a 2-1 lead entering the final period of play, but the Fighting Sioux responded with three goals in the final 20 minutes of play, with two of those goals scored by Lee Goren. Goren tied the game, assisted on Jason Ulmer's game-winning goal, and then scored into an empty Eagles net in the last minute of play to ice the victory. It marked North Dakota's seventh national title overall and second since 1997, and was also the third time in three years that BC came up short in the Frozen Four.

North Dakota had advanced to the title game by blanking Maine, 2-0, in the early semifinal on April 6, while BC came from behind to top St. Lawrence, 4-2, in the late semifinal that evening.

== Qualifying teams ==
The at-large bids and seeding for each team in the tournament were announced after the conference tournaments concluded on March 18, 2000. Hockey East had four teams receive a berth in the tournament, Western Collegiate Hockey Association (WCHA) had three teams receive a berth in the tournament, Central Collegiate Hockey Association (CCHA) and the ECAC each had two berths, while College Hockey America (CHA) received its first entry into the tournament.

West Regional – Minneapolis							East Regional – Albany						
Seed	School	Conference	Record	Berth type	Appearance	Last bid	Seed	School	Conference	Record	Berth type	Appearance	Last bid
1	Wisconsin	WCHA	31–8–1	At-large bid	18th	1998	1	Maine	Hockey East	26–7–5	Tournament champion	10th	1999
2	North Dakota	WCHA	28–8–5	Tournament champion	16th	1999	2	St. Lawrence	ECAC	26–7–2	Tournament champion	14th	1999
3	New Hampshire	Hockey East	23–8–6	At-large bid	11th	1999	3	Boston University	Hockey East	24–9–7	At-large bid	25th	1998
4	Boston College	Hockey East	26–11–1	At-large bid	21st	1999	4	Colgate	ECAC	24–8–2	At-large bid	3rd	1990
5	Michigan State	CCHA	27–10–4	Tournament champion	20th	1999	5	Michigan	CCHA	26–9–4	At-large bid	23rd	1999
6	Niagara	CHA	29–7–3	At-large bid	1st	Never	6	St. Cloud State	WCHA	23–13–3	At-large bid	2nd	1989

== Game locations ==
- East Regional – Pepsi Arena, Albany, New York
- West Regional – Mariucci Arena, Minneapolis, Minnesota
- Frozen Four – Providence Civic Center, Providence, Rhode Island

== Bracket ==
First Round; March 24–25
W4	Boston College	6*
W5	Michigan State	5
E3	Boston University	5
E6	St. Cloud State	3
E4	Colgate	3
E5	Michigan	4*
W3	New Hampshire	1
W6	Niagara	4

Quarterfinals; March 25–26
W1	Wisconsin	1
W4	Boston College	4
E2	St. Lawrence	3****
E3	Boston University	2
E1	Maine	5
E5	Michigan	2
W2	North Dakota	4
W6	Niagara	1

National Semifinals; April 6
W4	Boston College	4
E2	St. Lawrence	2
E1	Maine	0
W2	North Dakota	2

National Championship; April 8
W4	Boston College	2
W2	North Dakota	4

Note: * denotes overtime period(s)

== Results ==
=== East Regional – Albany, New York ===
==== First Round ====
March 25, 2000; 12:00 pm	(3) Boston University	5–3 (3–0, 1–2, 1–1)	(6) St. Cloud State	Pepsi Arena

Game reference

Rick DiPietro
Goalies
Scott Meyer
Referee:
Drew Shegos
Linesmen:
John Jones
Tom Carpenito

(unassisted) Carl Corazzini – 02:35	1 – 0
(Sabo, Corazzini) Jack Baker – 09:19	2 – 0
(Collins, Gillis) Mike Pandolfo – PP – 15:39	3 – 0
	3 – 1	32:22 – Mike Pudlick (Walsh)
(Corazzini) Jack Baker – GW – 33:39	4 – 1
	4 – 2	38:26 – PP – Ryan Malone (Motzko, Anderson)
(Gillis, Degerman) Chris Heron – 54:10	5 – 2
	5 – 3	58:34 – Lee Brooks (Westcott)

20 min
Penalties
10 min
24
Shots
26

March 25, 2000; 3:30 pm	(4) Colgate	3–4 (OT) (0–2, 2–1, 1–0, 0–1)	(5) Michigan	Pepsi Arena; Attendance: 8,301

Game reference
Shep Harder	Goalies	Josh Blackburn	Referee: Jim Fitzgerald; Linesmen: Randy Schmidt; Dan Carey
(Marostega) Andy McDonald – PP – 32:43 (McDonald, Murphy) Darryl Campbell – PP – 37:13 (Nolan, McDonald) Darryl Campbell – 59:12 / Goals / 06:41 – Mike Roemensky (Langfeld, Koch); 16:55 – PP – Mike Comrie (Cammalleri); 26:39 – PP – Mark Mink (Cammalleri, Shouneyia); 72:44 – GW – Geoff Koch (Comrie)			Referee: Jim Fitzgerald; Linesmen: Randy Schmidt; Dan Carey
18 min	Penalties	18 min	Referee: Jim Fitzgerald; Linesmen: Randy Schmidt; Dan Carey
31	Shots	35	Referee: Jim Fitzgerald; Linesmen: Randy Schmidt; Dan Carey

==== Quarterfinals ====
March 26, 2000; 7:00 pm	(1) Maine	5–2 (0–0, 0–1, 5–1)	(5) Michigan	Pepsi Arena; Attendance: 9,094

Game reference

Matt Yeats
Goalies
Josh Blackburn
Referee:
Mike Schmitt
Linesmen:
Tom Carpenito
John Jones

	0 – 1	32:22 – SH – Mike Comrie (Ortmeyer, Peach)
(Dimitrakos, Reimann) Ben Guite – PP – 45:14	1 – 1
	1 – 2	46:52 – PP – Mike Comrie (Cammalleri, Ortmeyer)
(Larose, Loya) Ben Guite – 48:01	2 – 2
(B. Heisten) Chris Heisten – GW – 54:29	3 – 2
(Reimann) Matthias Trattnig – 55:31	4 – 2
(unassisted) Brendan Walsh – EN SH – 59:09	5 – 2

29 min
Penalties
18 min
45
Shots
28

March 26, 2000; 12:00 pm	(2) St. Lawrence	3–2 (4OT) (1–0, 1–1, 0–1, 0–0, 0–0, 0–0, 1–0)	(3) Boston University	Pepsi Arena; Attendance: 9,094

Game reference

Derek Gustafson
Goalies
Rick DiPietro
Referee:
Duke Shegos
Linesmen:
Dan Carey
Randy Schmidt

(Gellard) Brandon Dietrich – 17:14	1 – 0
(S. Muir) Jack O'Brien – 22:01	2 – 0
	2 – 1	32:48 – PP – Mike Pandolfo (unassisted)
	2 – 2	51:50 – PP – Brian Collins (Dyment, Gillis)
(Lorentz) Robin Carruthers – GW – 123:53	3 – 2

20 min
Penalties
12 min
80
Shots
74

=== West Regional – Minneapolis, Minnesota ===
==== First Round ====
March 24, 2000; 5:00 pm	(3) New Hampshire	1–4 (0–2, 0–1, 1–1)	(6) Niagara	Mariucci Arena; Attendance: 8,042

Game reference

Ty Conklin
Goalies
Greg Gardner
Referee:
Don Adam
Linesmen:
Bill Jones
Jeff Fulton

	0 – 1	07:23 – Randy Harris (Sebastian)
	0 – 2	09:06 – GW – Kyle Martin (DeSantis, Kasperek)
	0 – 3	31:19 – Mikko Sivonen (Isherwood)
(Gare, Truelson) Darren Haydar – 41:29	1 – 3
	1 – 4	58:40 – EN – Mikko Sivonen (Makela)

16 min
Penalties
8 min
35
Shots
19

March 24, 2000; 8:30 pm	(4) Boston College	6–5 (OT) (0–2, 3–1, 2–2, 1–0)	(5) Michigan State	Mariucci Arena; Attendance: 8,042

Game reference

Scott Clemmensen
Goalies
Ryan Miller
Referee:
Drew Taylor
Matt Shegos (replaced Taylor in 2nd period due to injury)
Linesmen:
Marco Hunt
Greg Wohlers

	0 – 1	04:19 – Adam Hall (Horcoff, Maloney)
	0 – 2	08:33 – John Nail (Patchell)
(Mottau, Allen) Jeff Farkas – PP – 20:34	1 – 2
(Allen, Lephart) Brian Gionta – PP – 21:39	2 – 2
	2 – 3	29:53 – Andrew Hutchinson (unassisted)
(unassisted) Blake Bellefeuille – SH – 34:02	3 – 3
	3 – 4	41:11 – PP – John-Michael Liles (Horcoff, Hutchinson)
(Hughes, Kolanos) Kevin Caulfield – PP – 50:35	4 – 4
	4 – 5	53:05 – PP – Rustyn Dolyny (Horcoff, Liles)
(Mottau, Bellefeuille) Mike Lephart – EA PP – 59:10	5 – 5
(Gionta, Mottau) Jeff Farkas – GW PP – 71:53	6 – 5

19 min
Penalties
33 min
42
Shots
22

==== Quarterfinals ====
March 25, 2000; 8:30 pm	(1) Wisconsin	1–4 (1–2, 0–0, 0–2)	(4) Boston College	Mariucci Arena; Attendance: 9,468

Game reference
Graham Melanson	Goalies	Scott Clemmensen	Referee: Matt Shegos; Linesmen: Bill Jones; Jeff Fulton
(Doman, Hussey) Jeff Dessner – PP – 04:37 / Goals / 02:40 – PP – Blake Bellefeuille (unassisted); 19:37 – GW – Brian Gionta (Scuderi); 40:16 – Jeff Giuliano (Lephart); 59:56 – EN – Brian Gionta (Dolinar)			Referee: Matt Shegos; Linesmen: Bill Jones; Jeff Fulton
12 min	Penalties	12 min	Referee: Matt Shegos; Linesmen: Bill Jones; Jeff Fulton
29	Shots	28	Referee: Matt Shegos; Linesmen: Bill Jones; Jeff Fulton

March 25, 2000; 5:00 pm	(2) North Dakota	4–1 (2–0, 0–1, 2–0)	(6) Niagara	Mariucci Arena; Attendance: 9,468

Game reference

Andy Kollar
Goalies
Greg Gardner
Referee:
Don Adam
Linesmen:
John LaDuke
Kevin Langseth

(Ulmer) Ryan Bayda – 03:11	1 – 0
(Panzer, Lundbohm) Mike Commodore – GW PP – 19:06	2 – 0
	2 – 1	32:13 – PP – John Heffernan (Sivonen, MacKenzie)
(Panzer) Lee Goren – 41:05	3 – 1
(Panzer, Lundbohm) Kevin Spiewak – 53:31	4 – 1

8 min
Penalties
10 min
43
Shots
27

=== Frozen Four – Providence, Rhode Island ===
==== National Semifinals ====
April 6, 2000; 2:00 pm	(E1) Maine	0–2 (0–0, 0–2, 0–0)	(W2) North Dakota	Providence Civic Center; Attendance: 11,484

Game reference
Matt Yeats	Goalies	Karl Goehring	Referee: Matt Shegos; Linesmen: Bill Jones; Jeff Fulton
0 – 1 / 27:35 – GW PP – Bryan Lundbohm (Schneekloth); 0 – 2 / 33:35 – SH – Kevin Spiewak (Noterman)			Referee: Matt Shegos; Linesmen: Bill Jones; Jeff Fulton
14 min	Penalties	14 min	Referee: Matt Shegos; Linesmen: Bill Jones; Jeff Fulton
30	Shots	34	Referee: Matt Shegos; Linesmen: Bill Jones; Jeff Fulton

April 6, 2000; 7:00 pm	(E2) St. Lawrence	2–4 (1–0, 1–1, 0–3)	(W4) Boston College	Providence Civic Center; Attendance: 11,484

Game reference

Derek Gustafson
Goalies
Scott Clemmensen
Referee:
Mike Schmitt
Linesmen:
John LaDuke
Kevin Langseth

(Anderson) Jason Windle – 16:15	1 – 0
	1 – 1	25:40 – SH – Blake Bellefeuille (unassisted)
(unassisted) Charlie Daniels – PP – 30:38	2 – 1
	2 – 2	43:04 – Mike Mottau (Cass, Farkas)
	2 – 3	58:03 – GW – Jeff Farkas (unassisted)
	2 – 4	59:59 – EN – Brian Gionta (unassisted)

8 min
Penalties
8 min
28
Shots
32

==== National Championship ====
April 8, 2000; 7:30 pm	(W2) North Dakota	4–2 (1–1, 0–1, 3–0)	(W4) Boston College	Providence Civic Center; Attendance: 11,484

Game reference
Referee: Matt Shegos; Linesmen: Bill Jones; Jeff Fulton

Scoring summary
Period	Team	Goal	Assist(s)	Time	Score
1st	UND	Mike Commodore (5)	Lundbohm and Skarperud	3:48	1–0 UND
1st	BC	Jeff Farkas (32) – PP	Bellefeuille and Gionta	16:47	1–1
2nd	BC	Marty Hughes (5)	Gionta	26:59	2–1 BC
3rd	UND	Lee Goren (33)	Bayda	42:43	2–2
3rd	UND	Jason Ulmer (18) – GW	Goren	54:22	3–2 UND
3rd	UND	Lee Goren (34) – EN	unassisted	59:14	4–2 UND
Penalty summary
Period	Team	Player	Penalty	Time	PIM
1st	UND	Aaron Schneekloth	Cross-checking	6:32	2:00
1st	BC	Jeff Giuliano	Hooking	10:02	2:00
1st	UND	Ryan Bayda	Slashing	11:35	2:00
1st	UND	Chad Mazurak	High-sticking	16:28	2:00
1st	BC	Jeff Giuliano	Hooking	17:13	2:00
2nd	UND	Chad Mazurak	Holding	20:25	2:00
2nd	UND	Tim O'Connell	Slashing	23:04	2:00
2nd	BC	Bench	Too many men (served by Marty Hughes)	24:21	2:00
2nd	UND	Mike Commodore	Holding	30:45	2:00
2nd	BC	Ales Dolinar	Slashing	30:45	2:00
2nd	UND	Mike Commodore	Tripping	34:26	2:00
3rd	none				

Shots by period
Team	1	2	3	T
Boston College	13	6	4	23
North Dakota	13	12	11	36

Goaltenders
Team	Name	Saves	Goals against	Time on ice
BC	Scott Clemmensen	32	3	58:47
UND	Karl Goehring	21	2	60:00

== All-Tournament team ==
- G: Karl Goehring (North Dakota)
- D: Mike Commodore (North Dakota)
- D: Mike Mottau (Boston College)
- F: Jeff Farkas (Boston College)
- F: Lee Goren* (North Dakota)
- F: Bryan Lundbohm (North Dakota)

* Most Outstanding Player(s)

== Record by conference ==
Conference	# of Bids	Record	Win %	Regional semifinals	Frozen Four	Championship Game	Champions
Hockey East	4	5-4	.556	3	2	1	-
WCHA	3	3-2	.600	2	1	1	1
CCHA	2	1-2	.333	1	-	-	-
ECAC	2	1-2	.333	1	1	-	-
CHA	1	1-1	.500	1	-	-	-
