= WCHA All-Tournament Teams =

The WCHA All-Tournament Team is an honor bestowed at the conclusion of the NCAA Division I Western Collegiate Hockey Association conference tournament to players who are considered to have performed best during the championship. Currently, the team is composed of three forwards, two defensemen, and one goaltender, with additional players named in the event of a tie.

Despite the tournament beginning in 1960, the WCHA All-Tournament Team wasn't named until 1988. Afterwards, it was named annually until 2016, after which the honor ceased to be awarded.

== All-Tournament Teams ==
=== 1980s ===
1988
Player	Pos	Team
Dean Anderson	G	Wisconsin
Randy Skarda	D	Minnesota
Paul Stanton	D	Wisconsin
Neil Eisenhut	F	North Dakota
Paul Ranheim	F	Wisconsin
Steve Tuttle	F	Wisconsin

1989
Player	Pos	Team
Bill Pye	G	Northern Michigan
John Goode	D	Northern Michigan
Darryl Olsen	D	Northern Michigan
Phil Berger	F	Northern Michigan
Doug MacDonald	F	Wisconsin
Jay Moore	F	Denver

=== 1990s ===
1990
Player	Pos	Team
Duane Derksen	G	Wisconsin
Jason Herter	D	North Dakota
Sean Hill	D	Wisconsin
Ken Gernander	F	Wisconsin
Greg Johnson	F	North Dakota
Russ Romaniuk	F	North Dakota

1991
Player	Pos	Team
Jeff Stolp	G	Minnesota
Sean Hill	D	Wisconsin
Brad Werenka	D	Northern Michigan
Mark Beaufait	F	Northern Michigan
Greg Johnson	F	North Dakota
Larry Olimb	F	Minnesota

1992
Player	Pos	Team
Corwin Saurdiff	G	Northern Michigan
Chris Hynnes	D	Colorado College
Doug Zmolek	D	Minnesota
Craig Johnson	F	Minnesota
Dan Plante	F	Wisconsin
Tony Szabo	F	Northern Michigan

1993
Player	Pos	Team
Corwin Saurdiff	G	Northern Michigan
Steve Carpenter	D	Northern Michigan
Brett Hauer	D	Minnesota-Duluth
Greg Hadden	F	Minnesota
Craig Johnson	F	Minnesota
Derek Plante	F	Minnesota-Duluth

1994
Player	Pos	Team
Grant Sjerven	G	St. Cloud State
Mickey Elick	D	Wisconsin
Chris McAlpine	D	Minnesota
Brian Bonin	F	Minnesota
Bill Lund	F	St. Cloud State
Jeff Nielsen	F	Minnesota

1995
Player	Pos	Team
Kirk Daubenspeck	G	Wisconsin
Eric Rud	D	Colorado College
Mark Strobel	D	Wisconsin
Jason Elders	F	Denver
Peter Geronazzo	F	Colorado College
Ryan Kraft	F	Minnesota

1996
Player	Pos	Team
Kirk Daubenspeck	G	Wisconsin
Mike Crowley	D	Minnesota
Scott Swanson	D	Colorado College
Brian Bonin	F	Minnesota
Bret Meyers	F	Michigan Tech
Jeff Mikesch	F	Michigan Tech

1997
Player	Pos	Team
Aaron Schweitzer	G	North Dakota
Curtis Murphy	D	North Dakota
Brian LaFleur	D	Minnesota
Kevin Hoogsteen	F	North Dakota
Ryan Kraft	F	North Dakota
Toby Petersen	F	Colorado College

1998
Player	Pos	Team
Graham Melanson	G	Wisconsin
Curtis Murphy	D	North Dakota
Matt Peterson	D	Wisconsin
Joe Bianchi	F	Wisconsin
Jason Blake	F	North Dakota
Stewart Bodtker	F	Colorado College

1999
Player	Pos	Team
Stephen Wagner	G	Denver
Joe Ritson	D	Denver
Erik Westrum	D	Minnesota
Justin Morrison	F	Colorado College
Jeff Panzer	F	North Dakota
Paul Veres	F	Denver

=== 2000s ===
2000
Player	Pos	Team
Andy Kollar	G	North Dakota
Dan Bjornlie	D	Wisconsin
Travis Roche	D	North Dakota
Ryan Bayda	F	North Dakota
Lee Goren	F	North Dakota
Brandon Sampair	F	St. Cloud State

2001
Player	Pos	Team
Scott Meyer	G	St. Cloud State
Travis Roche	D	North Dakota
Duvie Westcott	D	St. Cloud State
Tyler Arnason	F	St. Cloud State
Mark Cullen	F	Colorado College
Jeff Panzer	F	North Dakota

2002
Player	Pos	Team
Wade Dubielewicz	G	Denver
Ryan Caldwell	D	Denver
Jordan Leopold	D	Minnesota
Mark Cullen	F	Colorado College
Chris Paradise	F	Denver
Troy Riddle	F	Minnesota

2003
Player	Pos	Team
Justin Johnson	G	Minnesota
Keith Ballard	D	Minnesota
Tom Preissing	D	Colorado College
Shane Joseph	F	Minnesota State-Mankato
Junior Lessard	F	Minnesota-Duluth
Grant Potulny	F	Minnesota

2004
Player	Pos	Team
Kellen Briggs	G	Minnesota
Keith Ballard	D	Minnesota
Matt Jones	D	North Dakota
Brandon Bochenski	F	North Dakota
Danny Irmen	F	Minnesota
Zach Parise	F	North Dakota

2005
Player	Pos	Team
Curtis McElhinney	G	Colorado College
Nick Fuher	D	North Dakota
Matt Laasch	D	Denver
Gabe Gauthier	F	Denver
Rastislav Špirko	F	North Dakota
Brett Sterling	F	Colorado College

2006
Player	Pos	Team
Jordan Parise	G	North Dakota
Kyle Klubertanz	D	Wisconsin
Matt Smaby	D	North Dakota
Brock Hooton	F	St. Cloud State
T. J. Oshie	F	North Dakota
Ryan Potulny	F	Minnesota

2007
Player	Pos	Team
Jean-Philippe Lamoureux	G	North Dakota
Taylor Chorney	D	North Dakota
Mike Vannelli	D	Minnesota
Jake Dowell	F	Wisconsin
Jonathan Toews	F	North Dakota
Blake Wheeler	F	Minnesota

2008
Player	Pos	Team
Peter Mannino	G	Denver
Chris Butler	D	Denver
Taylor Chorney	D	North Dakota
Mike Hoeffel	F	Minnesota
Tom May	F	Denver
T. J. Oshie	F	North Dakota

2009
Player	Pos	Team
Alex Stalock	G	Minnesota-Duluth
Josh Meyers	D	Minnesota-Duluth
Patrick Wiercioch	D	Denver
Mike Connolly	F	Minnesota-Duluth
Jordy Murray	F	Wisconsin
MacGregor Sharp	F	Minnesota-Duluth

=== 2010s ===
2010
Player	Pos	Team
Brad Eidsness	G	North Dakota
Ben Blood	D	North Dakota
Garrett Raboin	D	St. Cloud State
Derrick Lapoint	F	North Dakota
Tony Mosey	F	St. Cloud State
Chris VandeVelde	F	North Dakota

2011
Player	Pos	Team
Sam Brittain	G	Denver
Matt Donovan	D	Denver
Chay Genoway	D	North Dakota
Matt Frattin	F	North Dakota
Anthony Maiani	F	Denver
Jaden Schwartz	F	Colorado College

2012
Player	Pos	Team
Aaron Dell	G	North Dakota
Derek Forbort	D	North Dakota
Andrew MacWilliam	D	North Dakota
Mario Lamoureux	F	North Dakota
Brock Nelson	F	North Dakota
Jason Zucker	F	Denver

2013
Player	Pos	Team
Joel Rumpel	G	Wisconsin
John Ramage	D	Wisconsin
Peter Stoykewych	D	Colorado College
Tyler Barnes	F	Wisconsin
Nic Kerdiles	F	Wisconsin
Rylan Schwartz	F	Colorado College

2014
Player	Pos	Team
Cole Huggins	G	Minnesota State
Austin Coldwell	D	Alaska-Anchorage
Brett Stern	D	Minnesota State
Teddy Blueger	F	Minnesota State
Bryce Gervais	F	Minnesota State
Gerald Mayhew	F	Ferris State

2015
Player	Pos	Team
Stephon Williams	G	Minnesota State
Zach Palmquist	D	Minnesota State
Brett Stern	D	Minnesota State
Tyler Heinonen	F	Michigan Tech
David Johnstone	F	Michigan Tech
Brad McClure	F	Minnesota State

2016
Player	Pos	Team
Cole Huggins	G	Minnesota State
Brandon Anselmini	D	Ferris State
Casey Nelson	D	Minnesota State
Kenny Babinski	F	Ferris State
Gerald Mayhew	F	Ferris State
Brad McClure	F	Minnesota State

=== All-Tournament Team players by school ===
==== Final members ====
School	Winners
Minnesota State	12
Northern Michigan	10
Ferris State	4
Michigan Tech	4
Alaska-Anchorage	1

==== Previous Members ====
School	Winners
North Dakota	41
Minnesota	27
Wisconsin	25
Denver	19
Colorado College	15
St. Cloud State	9
Minnesota-Duluth	7

=== Multiple appearances ===
Player	All-Tournament Team appearances
Keith Ballard	2
Brian Bonin	2
Taylor Chorney	2
Mark Cullen	2
Kirk Daubenspeck	2
Sean Hill	2
Cole Huggins	2
Craig Johnson	2
Greg Johnson	2
Ryan Kraft	2
Gerald Mayhew	2
Brad McClure	2
Curtis Murphy	2
T. J. Oshie	2
Jeff Panzer	2
Travis Roche	2
Corwin Saurdiff	2
Brett Stern	2
many players tied with	1

== See also ==
- WCHA Awards
- Most Valuable Player in Tournament
