= Fort Saskatchewan Senior High School =

Location
- 10002 97 Avenue; Fort Saskatchewan, Alberta, T8L 1R2; Canada; 53.7068°N 113.2138°W

Information
- School type: Public
- School board: Elk Island Public Schools Regional Division No. 14
- Principal: Aaron Tuckwood
- Grades: 10-12
- Enrollment: Approx. 500
- Language: English
- Colours: Green and Gold
- Mascot: Bee
- Team name: Sting
- Website: forthigh.ca

Fort Saskatchewan Senior High School (a.k.a. Fort High) is a public high school located in Fort Saskatchewan, Alberta, Canada. It serves approximately 450 students in Grades 10 through 12.

== History ==
In the early morning hours of Wednesday, March 5, 1986, firefighters began battling the raging fire that destroyed half of the school. The firefighters were called back several times during the day to put out smaller fires. A straw-insulated roof fed the fire in the nearly thirty-year-old building. Rumors were that the fire had been started by an overhead projector on the 2nd floor. Distraught students and teachers arrived at 7:00 AM to witness the disaster. Many emotions were stirred within the teachers and students as they realized the outcome.

Luckily, the fire did not spread to the other half of the school which housed the gym, several classrooms and two computer rooms. Some damage was done to the general office and library and they were not usable. Historical documents, like the graduation pictures that lined both sides of the main hallway were damaged beyond repair. In time, this collection of photographs was restored with the 1986 class being the first.

The school became known as Fort Half High. Within close quarters many activities continued successfully after the fire. The lunch room and gym became class rooms. Educational gym classes were moved to the Fort Saskatchewan Correction Facility's gym that was shared with the inmates.

In late 1987, new wings were completed and students attended a completed school thus ending Fort Half High.

In 1990, the Fort Saskatchewan High School's football team, known formerly as the Rams since opening, joined the other school teams and became known as the Sting.

== Services ==
- Food Services
- Library Services
- Counseling Services
- Knowledge and Employability Skills program
- French as a second language
- German as a second language

== Notable alumni ==
- Mike Commodore, NHL player
- Joffrey Lupul, NHL player
- Ray Whitney, NHL player
