= Ryan Kraft =

American ice hockey player (born 1975)

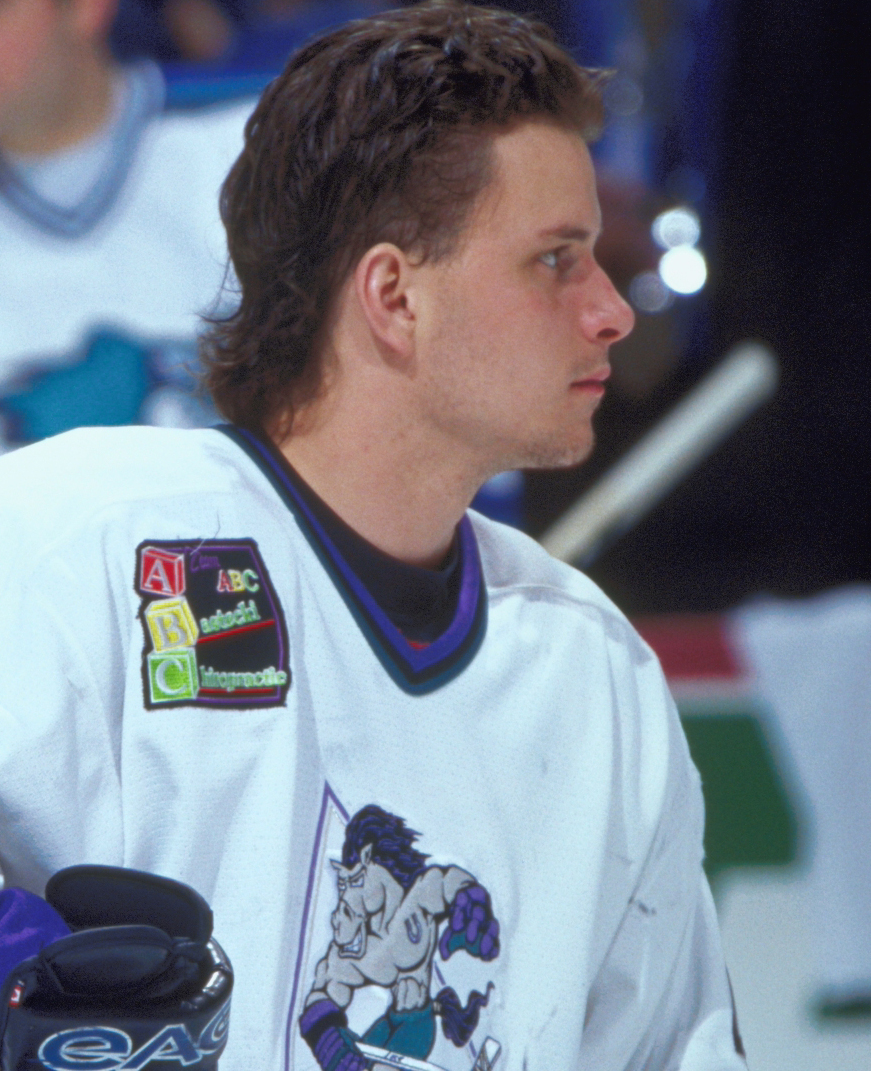
- Kraft in 2001
- Born: November 7, 1975 (age 50) Bottineau, North Dakota, U.S.
- Height: 5 ft 7 in (170 cm)
- Weight: 194 lb (88 kg; 13 st 12 lb)
- Position: Left wing
- Shot: Left
- Played for: San Jose Sharks; Kassel Huskies
- National team: United States
- NHL draft: 194th overall, 1995; San Jose Sharks
- Playing career: 1998–2010

Ryan Kraft (born November 7, 1975) is an American former professional ice hockey Winger who played in the National Hockey League (NHL) with the San Jose Sharks. He is currently the head coach for the Moorhead Spuds girls hockey team.

== Playing career ==
Kraft played collegiate hockey with the University of Minnesota in the Western Collegiate Hockey Association (WCHA) before he was selected in the eighth round, 194th overall, in the 1995 NHL entry draft by the San Jose Sharks.

As a member of the Sharks' ECHL affiliate, the Richmond Renegades, Kraft was named to the ECHL All-Star Team during the 1998–99 season and the 1999–2000 season. Kraft would finish his rookie season as a point-per-game player, scoring 64 points in 63 games during the regular season. Kraft would also go on to score 20 points in 18 post-season games in that same season. Richmond would go on to lose to eventual Kelly Cup Champion Mississippi in overtime of the seventh and deciding game of the Finals.

Kraft had previously played for the San Jose Sharks of the NHL, scoring one assist in seven games.

== Coaching career ==
On January 29, 2013, it was announced that Kraft would serve as assistant coach of the Minnesota Magicians in the North American Hockey League. On June 24, 2019 Kraft was named head coach of the Moorhead Minnesota High School girls varsity hockey team.

== Personal ==
Kraft was born in Bottineau, North Dakota and raised and currently resides in Moorhead, Minnesota.

== Career statistics ==
=== Regular season and playoffs ===
			Regular season					Playoffs
Season	Team	League	GP	G	A	Pts	PIM	GP	G	A	Pts	PIM
1991–92	Moorhead High School	HS-MN	—	—	—	—	—	—	—	—	—	—
1993–94	Moorhead High School	HS-MN	25	40	45	85	—	—	—	—	—	—
1994–95	University of Minnesota	WCHA	44	13	33	46	44	—	—	—	—	—
1995–96	University of Minnesota	WCHA	41	13	24	37	24	—	—	—	—	—
1996–97	University of Minnesota	WCHA	42	25	21	46	37	—	—	—	—	—
1997–98	University of Minnesota	WCHA	32	11	26	37	16	—	—	—	—	—
1998–99	Richmond Renegades	ECHL	63	28	36	64	35	18	10	10	20	4
1999–2000	Richmond Renegades	ECHL	44	32	35	67	32	—	—	—	—	—
1999–2000	Kentucky Thoroughblades	AHL	15	7	6	13	2	5	3	1	4	0
1999–2000	Cleveland Lumberjacks	IHL	1	0	1	1	0	—	—	—	—	—
2000–01	Kentucky Thoroughblades	AHL	77	38	50	88	36	3	2	0	2	0
2001–02	Cleveland Barons	AHL	63	19	41	60	42	—	—	—	—	—
2002–03	San Jose Sharks	NHL	7	0	1	1	0	—	—	—	—	—
2002–03	Cleveland Barons	AHL	53	14	27	41	12	—	—	—	—	—
2003–04	Bridgeport Sound Tigers	AHL	74	15	21	36	20	6	2	2	4	0
2004–05	Bridgeport Sound Tigers	AHL	38	9	9	18	12	—	—	—	—	—
2005–06	Kassel Huskies	DEL	49	17	31	48	34	—	—	—	—	—
2006–07	Kassel Huskies	DEU.2	50	18	22	40	60	10	4	8	12	12
2007–08	Kassel Huskies	DEU.2	49	23	30	53	36	14	3	5	8	12
2008–09	Kassel Huskies	DEL	47	14	20	34	38	—	—	—	—	—
2009–10	Kassel Huskies	DEL	52	12	14	26	28	—	—	—	—	—
AHL totals			320	102	154	256	124	14	7	3	10	0
NHL totals			7	0	1	1	0	—	—	—	—	—
DEL totals			148	43	65	108	100	—	—	—	—	—

=== International ===
Year	Team	Event	Result	GP	G	A	Pts	PIM
2001	United States	WC	4th	9	0	2	2	0
Senior totals				9	0	2	2	0

== Awards and honors ==
Award	Year
College
All-WCHA Rookie Team	1994–95
WCHA All-Tournament Team	1995, 1997
All-WCHA Third Team	1996–97
AHL
All-Star Game	2001, 2002
All-Rookie Team	2001
Red Garrett Memorial Award	2001
Second all-star team	2001
