= Dan Bjornlie =

American ice hockey player

- Born: October 17, 1977 (age 48) Eagan, Minnesota, U.S.
- Height: 5 ft 11 in (180 cm)
- Weight: 187 lb (85 kg; 13 st 5 lb)
- Position: Defense
- Shot: Left
- Played for: Portland Pirates; Kölner Haie; Vienna Capitals
- NHL draft: Undrafted
- Playing career: 2000–2013

Dan Bjornlie (born October 17, 1977, in Eagan, Minnesota) is an American former professional ice hockey defenseman who last played competitively with the Vienna Capitals of the Erste Bank Hockey League.

His pro career began with two seasons in the United Hockey League with the Quad City Mallards. He also played two games in the American Hockey League with the Portland Pirates. He then moved to Germany, playing in 2nd Bundesliga with SC Riessersee in a two-year spell. His spell ended after the team was excluded from the league for financial reasons. He eventually moved to up to the Deutsche Eishockey Liga, the country's top league, playing for the Kölner Haie. He later returned to the 2nd. Bundesliga with SC Bietigheim-Bissingen. In 2007, he signed with the Vienna Capitals.

== Awards and honors ==
Award	Year
WCHA All-Tournament Team	2000
