= Travis Roche =

Canadian ice hockey player

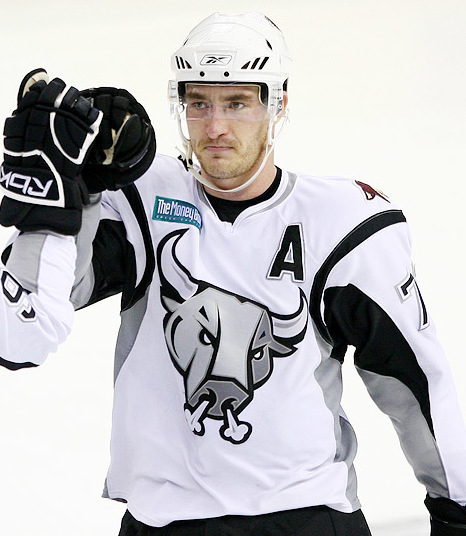
- Roche with the San Antonio Rampage in 2007
- Born: June 17, 1978 (age 48) Grande Cache, Alberta, Canada
- Height: 6 ft 1 in (185 cm)
- Weight: 200 lb (91 kg; 14 st 4 lb)
- Position: Defence
- Shot: Right
- Played for: Minnesota Wild; Phoenix Coyotes; SC Bern; Modo Hockey; EHC Black Wings Linz
- NHL draft: Undrafted
- Playing career: 2001–2016

Travis Roche (born June 17, 1978) is a Canadian former professional ice hockey defenseman who last played for EHC Black Wings Linz of the Austrian Hockey League (EBEL).

== Playing career ==
An offensive defenceman, Roche played two seasons for the University of North Dakota Fighting Sioux. In his freshman season, 1999–2000, the Sioux won the NCAA Frozen Four, defeating Maine in the semifinals, then Boston College in the championship game held in Providence, Rhode Island. Roche was named to the WCHA All-Tournament Team.

The following season (the final season at “old” Ralph Engelstad Arena), the team captured the MacNaughton Cup as the WCHA regular season champions with an 18–4–6 record in 2000–01. The team lost the Final Five championship game to St. Cloud State in overtime, 6–5, and the Sioux were defeated by Boston College 3–2 in the Frozen Four title game, with Roche named to the WCHA All-Tournament team, the NCAA Frozen Four All-Tournament Team, and he was honored as an NCAA West First Team All-American. Roche holds Fighting Sioux single-game records for goals by a defenceman (3), points by a defenceman (6), and assists by a defenceman.

For his collegiate career, Roche appeared in 88 games, scoring 17 goals, passing out 60 assists, and scoring 77 points.

He was signed to a two-season contract by the Minnesota Wild on April 8, 2001, one day after the end of the Sioux's 2001 national championship run, appearing in the final game of the Wild's 2000–2001 season. He joined their AHL affiliate, the Houston Aeros for the better part of the 2001–02 season, finishing with 34 points (13G-21A) in 60 games while playing a handful of games with the parent club in Minnesota.

Roche returned to Houston for the better part of the 2002–03 season, establishing career highs in goals (14), assists (34) and points (48) and was a key player in the team's run to the 2003 Calder Cup title. In 2003–04, Roche spent the majority of season with the Houston while playing a handful of games with the Wild.

Roche signed with the Atlanta Thrashers in the summer 2004 and competed for the club's AHL affiliate Chicago Wolves for in the 2004–2005 and 2005–2006 seasons, and was named AHL First Team All-Star in 2005 with the team advancing to the AHL Finals.

Roche signed as a free agent with the Phoenix Coyotes in the summer of 2006, and after a strong training camp for head coach Wayne Gretzky, and with 17 games played, one goal and nine assists for the team's AHL affiliate, the San Antonio Rampage, Roche was called up by the Coyotes for the remainder of the 2006–2007 NHL season. Roche established NHL career highs for games played (50), goals (6), assists (13), points (19) and PIM (22) and also led the team in plus/minus ratio (+2). His first NHL goal was scored on Miikka Kiprusoff of the Calgary Flames on December 16, 2006. He had a multiple point game two weeks later, and he had a game-winning goal against the Los Angeles Kings on January 20, 2007.

Roche represented Canada at the Spengler Cup in 2009, 2010 and 2012, and was also named to the 2013 roster. He was also named to Team Canada for the 2011 tournament, but did not play due to injury. At the 2010 tournament, he was named one of the tournament's best defencemen after Team Canada won silver. He won gold with Team Canada at the 2012 tournament.

Roche appeared in 60 games over four NHL seasons between 2000–01 and 2006–07, where he collected 6 goals and 14 assists for 20 points and was assessed 24 PIM.

On August 11, 2014, after six seasons with SC Bern in the Swiss National League A, Roche left as a free agent to sign in the Swedish Hockey League on a one-year contract with Modo Hockey.

== Personal life ==
He and his wife, Darcie live in the St. Paul, Minnesota area in the off-season. He is from Grande Cache, Alberta and was raised in Whitecourt, Alberta

== Coaching career ==
Roche is the first back to back Peewee B2 Minnesota Hockey District 3 coach, winning in both the 2022–2023 season and again in the 2023–2024 season.

== Career statistics ==
			Regular season					Playoffs
Season	Team	League	GP	G	A	Pts	PIM	GP	G	A	Pts	PIM
1996–97	Trail Smoke Eaters	BCHL	49	17	40	57	159	—	—	—	—	—
1997–98	Trail Smoke Eaters	BCHL	38	11	31	42	104	11	0	8	8	21
1999–00	University of North Dakota	WCHA	42	6	22	28	60	—	—	—	—	—
2000–01	University of North Dakota	WCHA	46	11	38	49	42	—	—	—	—	—
2000–01	Minnesota Wild	NHL	1	0	0	0	0	—	—	—	—	—
2001–02	Minnesota Wild	NHL	4	0	0	0	2	—	—	—	—	—
2001–02	Houston Aeros	AHL	60	13	21	34	107	12	2	3	5	6
2002–03	Houston Aeros	AHL	65	14	34	48	42	23	3	5	8	26
2003–04	Minnesota Wild	NHL	5	0	1	1	0	—	—	—	—	—
2003–04	Houston Aeros	AHL	60	8	30	38	18	2	0	0	0	2
2004–05	Chicago Wolves	AHL	73	12	38	50	59	18	1	6	7	18
2005–06	Chicago Wolves	AHL	59	8	31	39	73	—	—	—	—	—
2006–07	San Antonio Rampage	AHL	17	1	8	9	16	—	—	—	—	—
2006–07	Phoenix Coyotes	NHL	50	6	13	19	22	—	—	—	—	—
2007–08	San Antonio Rampage	AHL	71	6	35	41	65	5	0	2	2	8
2008–09	SC Bern	NLA	49	16	32	48	120	4	0	3	3	6
2009–10	SC Bern	NLA	47	8	22	30	50	15	2	8	10	28
2010–11	SC Bern	NLA	39	9	32	41	16	9	0	2	2	6
2011–12	SC Bern	NLA	25	2	13	15	8	3	0	1	1	4
2012–13	SC Bern	NLA	31	5	17	22	14	19	3	12	15	14
2013–14	SC Bern	NLA	38	5	16	21	49	—	—	—	—	—
2014–15	Modo Hockey	SHL	37	2	11	13	30	—	—	—	—	—
2015–16	EHC Black Wings Linz	EBEL	3	0	0	0	2	5	0	3	3	0
NHL totals			60	6	14	20	24	—	—	—	—	—

Medal record

Ice hockey

Representing Canada

Spengler Cup
Silver medal – second place	2010 Canada	
Gold medal – first place	2012 Canada	

== Awards and honors ==
Award	Year
BCHL
Second All-Star Team	1997
Rookie of the Year Award	1997
Playoff MVP Award	1997
First All-Star Team	1998
Best Defenceman Award	1998
College
All-WCHA Rookie Team	1999–00
WCHA All-Tournament Team	2000, 2001
All-WCHA First Team	2000–01
AHCA West First-Team All-American	2000–01
All-NCAA All-Tournament Team	2001
AHL
Yanick Dupre Memorial Award	2002
First All-Star Team	2005
NLA
Most assists by Defenseman (32)	2011
Most Points by Defenseman (41)	2011
Championship (SC Bern)	2010, 2013
Spengler Cup
All-Star Team	2010

== Transactions ==
- April 8, 2001 - Minnesota Wild: signed as a free agent
- July 14, 2004 - Atlanta Thrashers: signed as a free agent
- July 20, 2006 - Phoenix Coyotes: signed as a free agent
