= Dean Blais =

American ice hockey coach

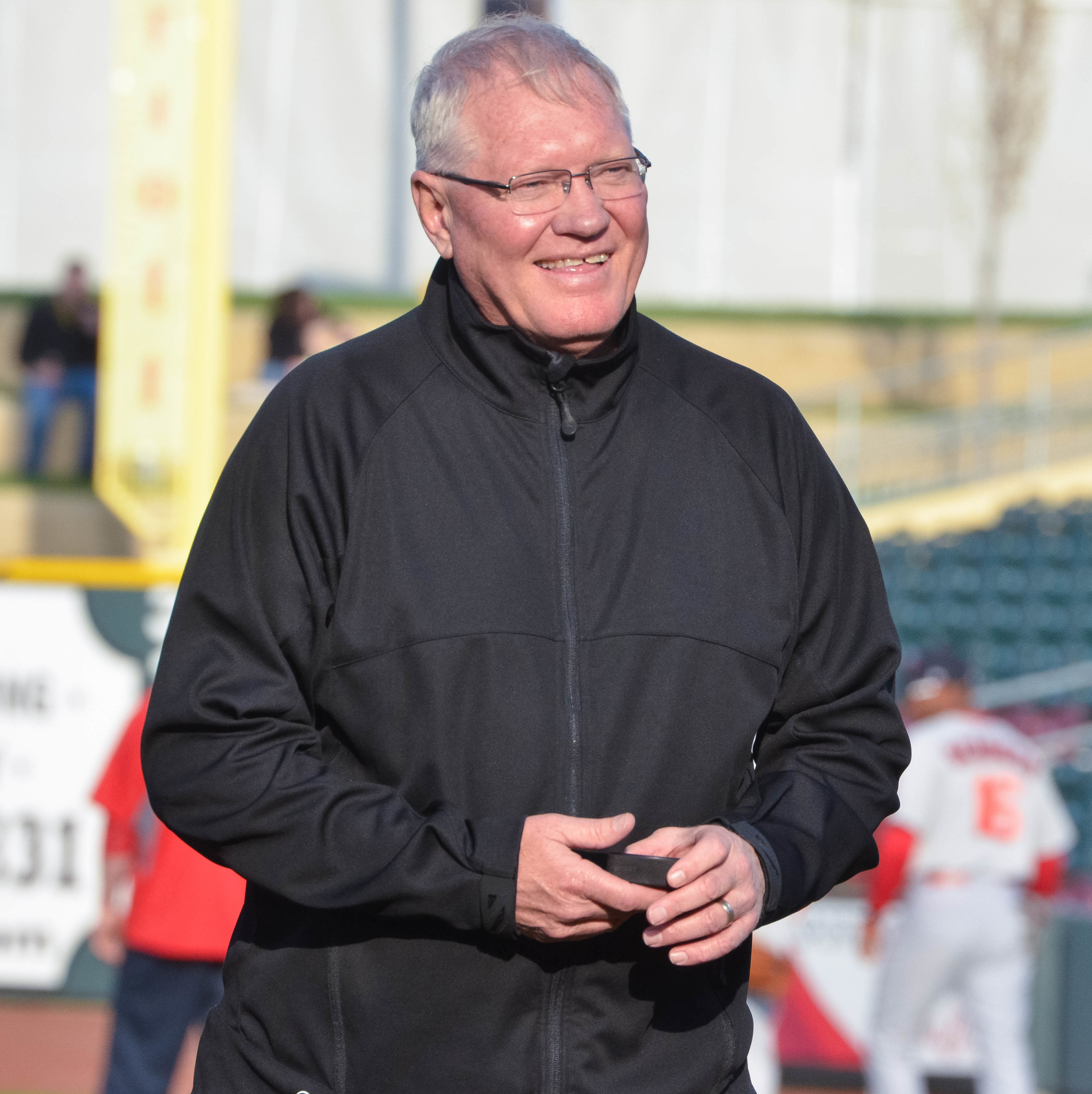
- Blais in Omaha in 2015
- Born: January 18, 1951 (age 75) International Falls, Minnesota, U.S.
- Height: 6 ft 1 in (185 cm)
- Weight: 185 lb (84 kg; 13 st 3 lb)
- Position: Forward
- Shot: Left
- Played for: Dallas Black Hawks (CHL)
- NHL draft: 68th overall, 1971; Chicago Blackhawks
- Playing career: 1973–1976

Dean Charles Blais (born January 18, 1951) is an American ice hockey coach. He was the head coach of the University of North Dakota men's hockey team, head coach of the Omaha Mavericks, the men's team of the University of Nebraska Omaha, and also head coach of the United States men's national junior ice hockey team. He led Team USA to a gold medal in the IIHF 2010 World Junior Ice Hockey Championships in Saskatoon, Canada, held in late December 2009 through early January 2010.

He is the former associate coach of the NHL's Columbus Blue Jackets. He led the University of North Dakota Fighting Sioux (now Fighting Hawks) men's hockey team to NCAA Division I championships in 1997 and 2000. Blais also has two other appearances in the Frozen Four, the semifinal round of the NCAA tournament—with North Dakota in 2001 (losing in the championship game) and Omaha in 2015 (losing in the semifinals). Blais also led the 1990 Roseau Rams to a Minnesota State High School Hockey Championship.

== Playing career ==
A native of International Falls, Minnesota, Blais played college hockey at the University of Minnesota from 1970 to 1973. He was selected by the Chicago Blackhawks in the 5th round (68th overall) of the 1971 NHL Amateur Draft, and played three seasons of pro hockey with the Chicago Blackhawks’ development team in Dallas. He also played for the United States national team at the 1973 ice hockey world championship pool B tournament.

== In popular culture ==
On March 10, 2009 and May 14, 2010, a photograph of Blais was shown on the Late Show with David Letterman for a segment called, "Guys who look like Dave."

== Career ==
- 1976–1977 – University of Minnesota – Assistant Coach
- 1977–1980 – Minot High School (Minot, North Dakota) – Head Coach
- 1980–1989 – University of North Dakota – Assistant Coach
- 1990–1991 – Roseau High School (Roseau, Minnesota) – Head Coach
- 1991-1992 - Assistant coach Olympic men’s ice hockey team
- 1991–1994 – International Falls High School (International Falls, Minnesota) – Head Coach
- 1994–2004 – University of North Dakota – Head Coach
- 2004–2006 – Columbus Blue Jackets (NHL) – Associate Coach
- 2006–2007 – Columbus Blue Jackets (NHL) – Player Development
- 2007–2009 – Fargo Force (USHL) – General Manager/Head Coach
- 2009–2010 – Team USA U20 – Head Coach
- 2009–2017 – University of Nebraska Omaha – Head Coach
- 2011-2012– Team USA U20 – Head Coach

== Head coaching record ==
Record table
Season	Team	Overall	Conference	Standing	Postseason
North Dakota Fighting Sioux (WCHA) (1994–2004)
1994–95	North Dakota	18–18–3	14–15–3	t-5th	WCHA Quarterfinal
1995–96	North Dakota	19–18–1	16–15–1	1-4th	WCHA first round
1996–97	North Dakota	31–10–2	21–10–1	t-1st	NCAA national champion
1997–98	North Dakota	30–8–1	21–6–1	1st	NCAA West Regional semifinals
1998–99	North Dakota	32–6–2	24–2–2	1st	NCAA West Regional semifinals
1999–00	North Dakota	31–8–5	17–6–5	2nd	NCAA national champion
2000–01	North Dakota	29–8–9	18–4–6	1st	NCAA runner-up
2001–02	North Dakota	16–19–2	11–15–2	t-6th	WCHA first round
2002–03	North Dakota	26–12–5	14–9–5	4th	NCAA West Regional semifinals
2003–04	North Dakota	30–8–3	20–5–3	1st	NCAA West Regional Final
North Dakota:		262–115–33			
Nebraska–Omaha Mavericks (CCHA) (2009–2010)
2009–10	Nebraska–Omaha	20–16–6	13–12–3–2	6th	CCHA quarterfinals
Nebraska–Omaha Mavericks (WCHA) (2010–2013)
2010–11	Nebraska–Omaha	21–16–2	17–9–2	3rd	NCAA West Regional semifinals
2011–12	Nebraska–Omaha	14–18–6	11–12–5	9th	WCHA first round
2012–13	Nebraska–Omaha	19–18–2	14–12–2	7th	WCHA first round
Omaha Mavericks (NCHC) (2013–2017)
2013–14	Omaha	17–18–2	13–9–2–1	3rd	NCHC semifinals
2014–15	Omaha	20–13–6	12–8–4–3	3rd	NCAA Frozen Four
2015–16	Omaha	18–17–1	8–15–1–0	6th	NCHC quarterfinals
2016–17	Omaha	17–17–5	9–13–2–0	6th	NCHC quarterfinals
Omaha:		146–133–30			
Total:		408–248–63			
National champion Postseason invitational champion Conference regular season champion Conference regular season and conference tournament champion Division regular season champion Division regular season and conference tournament champion Conference tournament champion

== Awards and honors ==
Award	Year
All-NCAA All-Tournament team	1971

== See also ==
- List of college men's ice hockey coaches with 400 wins

Sporting positions
Preceded by Gino Gasparini	Head coach of the University of North Dakota; 1994–2004	Succeeded by Dave Hakstol
Preceded by Position established	Head coach of the Fargo Force; 2007–2009	Succeeded by Steve Johnson
Preceded by Mike Kemp	Head coach of the University of Nebraska Omaha; 2009–2017	Succeeded by Mike Gabinet
Awards and achievements
Preceded by Bruce Crowder; Joe Marsh	Spencer Penrose Award; 1996–97; 2000–01	Succeeded by Tim Taylor; Tim Whitehead
Preceded by Don Lucia; Craig Dahl; Don Brose; George Gwozdecky	WCHA Coach of the Year; 1996–97; 1998–99; 2000–01; 2010–11	Succeeded by Craig Dahl; Don Brose; George Gwozdecky; Mel Pearson
