= Badger Showdown =

- Sport: College ice hockey
- Founded: 1989
- Folded: 2010
- No. of teams: 4
- Venues: Bradley Center 1989–2002; Kohl Center 2003–2010
- Last champion: Wisconsin
- Most titles: Wisconsin (11)

The Badger Showdown was a college Division I men's ice hockey tournament usually played before New Years at first the Bradley Center in Milwaukee, Wisconsin and then the Kohl Center in Madison. Wisconsin served as the tournament's host for the entirety of its run. The tournament was first held in 1989 and was played during the final week of December every year but twice: in 2005 and 2010. Wisconsin competed in the tournament every year and won more than half of the total championships (11 out of 21).

The tournament was conceived by Jeff Sauer and Joel Maturi and was initially a huge success, drawing over 30,000 fans for its first iteration. By the 21st century, however, its audience had dwindled to less than half that number and its main sponsor dropped the showcase in 2002. A move to the Badger's home venue in 2003 kept the tournament alive for several more years but it was ultimately cancelled as a cost-cutting measure, with the final championship held in January 2010.

The tournament champion received the Pettit Cup, named in honor of Lloyd and Jane Bradley Pettit.

== Yearly results ==
| Year | Pettit Cup | Runner-up | Third place | Fourth place |
|---|---|---|---|---|
| 2009 | Wisconsin | Yale | Ferris State | Merrimack |
| 2008 | Wisconsin | Lake Superior State | Alabama-Huntsville | Harvard |
| 2007 | Northeastern | Colgate | Wisconsin | Bowling Green |
| 2006 | Clarkson | Lake Superior State | Wisconsin | Providence |
| 2005 | Wisconsin | Northern Michigan | Wayne State | Western Michigan |
| 2004 | Ferris State | Wisconsin | Clarkson | Yale |
| 2003 | Ferris State | Wisconsin | Massachusetts–Lowell | Union |
| 2002 | Wisconsin | Northern Michigan | Harvard | Colgate |
| 2001 | New Hampshire | Brown | Wisconsin | Colorado College |
| 2000 | Wisconsin | Boston University | North Dakota | Princeton |
| 1999 | North Dakota | Wisconsin | Nebraska-Omaha | Miami |
| 1998 | Bowling Green | Yale | Cornell | Wisconsin |
| 1997 | Wisconsin | Northern Michigan | Harvard | Boston College |
| 1996 | New Hampshire | Colorado College | Vermont | Wisconsin |
| 1995 | Boston University | Notre Dame | Wisconsin | Princeton |
| 1994 | Wisconsin | Lake Superior State | Bowling Green | Northeastern |
| 1993 | Wisconsin | Northern Michigan | Providence | Alaska–Fairbanks |
| 1992 | Boston University | Wisconsin | Miami | Boston College |
| 1991 | Wisconsin | Maine | Yale | Toronto |
| 1990 | Wisconsin | North Dakota | St. Lawrence | Bowling Green |
| 1989 | Wisconsin | Boston College | Minnesota–Duluth | Notre Dame |

== Team records ==
| Team | # of times participated | Titles |
|---|---|---|
| Wisconsin | 21 | 11 |
| Boston University | 3 | 2 |
| Ferris State | 3 | 2 |
| New Hampshire | 2 | 2 |
| Bowling Green | 4 | 1 |
| North Dakota | 3 | 1 |
| Clarkson | 2 | 1 |
| Northeastern | 2 | 1 |
| Northern Michigan | 4 | 0 |
| Yale | 4 | 0 |
| Boston College | 3 | 0 |
| Harvard | 3 | 0 |
| Lake Superior State | 3 | 0 |
| Colgate | 2 | 0 |
| Colorado College | 2 | 0 |
| Miami | 2 | 0 |
| Notre Dame | 2 | 0 |
| Princeton | 2 | 0 |
| Providence | 2 | 0 |
| Alabama-Huntsville | 1 | 0 |
| Alaska-Fairbanks | 1 | 0 |
| Brown | 1 | 0 |
| Cornell | 1 | 0 |
| Maine | 1 | 0 |
| Massachusetts–Lowell | 1 | 0 |
| Merrimack | 1 | 0 |
| Minnesota-Duluth | 1 | 0 |
| Nebraska-Omaha | 1 | 0 |
| St. Lawrence | 1 | 0 |
| Toronto | 1 | 0 |
| Union | 1 | 0 |
| Vermont | 1 | 0 |
| Western Michigan | 1 | 0 |
| Wayne State | 1 | 0 |
