= Lee Goren =

Canadian ice hockey player (born 1977)

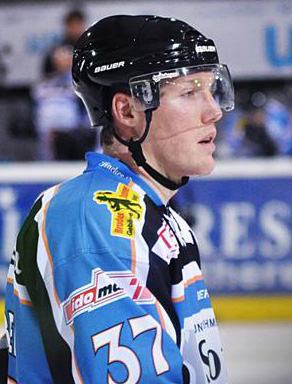
- Born: December 26, 1977 (age 48) Winnipeg, Manitoba, Canada
- Height: 6 ft 3 in (191 cm)
- Weight: 205 lb (93 kg; 14 st 9 lb)
- Position: Right wing
- Shot: Right
- Played for: Boston Bruins; Florida Panthers; Vancouver Canucks; Skellefteå AIK; EV Zug; Färjestad BK; Tappara Tampere; SC Bern; Straubing Tigers; Lahti Pelicans; Linköpings HC
- NHL draft: 63rd overall, 1997; Boston Bruins
- Playing career: 2000–2013

Lee Goren (born December 26, 1977) is a Canadian former professional ice hockey right winger who played in the National Hockey League (NHL) with the Boston Bruins, Florida Panthers and the Vancouver Canucks before playing the remainder of his career abroad in Europe.

Goren was drafted in the third round, 63rd overall by the Boston Bruins in the 1997 NHL entry draft. During his collegiate career with the University of North Dakota, he won an NCAA championship. He ended his career in the 2012-13 with Linköpings HC of the then Swedish Elitserien.

== Career statistics ==
			Regular season					Playoffs
Season	Team	League	GP	G	A	Pts	PIM	GP	G	A	Pts	PIM
1994–95	Winnipeg Warriors AAA	MMHL	31	19	31	50	50	—	—	—	—	—
1995–96	Minot Top Guns	SJHL	56	25	35	60	178	12	5	20	25	12
1995–96	Saskatoon Blades	WHL	2	0	0	0	2	—	—	—	—	—
1997–98	University of North Dakota	WCHA	29	3	13	16	26	—	—	—	—	—
1998–99	University of North Dakota	WCHA	38	26	19	45	20	—	—	—	—	—
1999–2000	University of North Dakota	WCHA	44	34	29	63	42	—	—	—	—	—
2000–01	Providence Bruins	AHL	54	15	18	33	72	17	5	2	7	11
2000–01	Boston Bruins	NHL	21	2	0	2	7	—	—	—	—	—
2001–02	Providence Bruins	AHL	71	11	26	37	121	2	0	0	0	0
2002–03	Providence Bruins	AHL	65	32	37	69	106	3	0	1	1	0
2002–03	Boston Bruins	NHL	14	2	1	3	7	5	0	0	0	5
2003–04	San Antonio Rampage	AHL	65	27	22	49	72	—	—	—	—	—
2003–04	Florida Panthers	NHL	2	0	1	1	0	—	—	—	—	—
2004–05	Manitoba Moose	AHL	79	32	30	62	117	14	10	3	13	13
2005–06	Manitoba Moose	AHL	42	22	19	41	84	13	3	7	10	27
2005–06	Vancouver Canucks	NHL	28	1	2	3	30	—	—	—	—	—
2006–07	Manitoba Moose	AHL	72	26	42	68	86	13	4	5	9	16
2006–07	Vancouver Canucks	NHL	2	0	0	0	0	—	—	—	—	—
2007–08	Skellefteå AIK	SEL	47	16	20	36	73	5	1	0	1	14
2008–09	EV Zug	NLA	9	5	6	11	10	—	—	—	—	—
2008–09	Färjestad BK	SEL	37	18	13	31	129	12	4	0	4	6
2009–10	Tappara	SM-l	12	3	8	11	42	—	—	—	—	—
2009–10	Färjestad BK	SEL	16	3	2	5	65	—	—	—	—	—
2009–10	SC Bern	NLA	9	0	4	4	14	6	4	2	6	8
2010–11	Straubing Tigers	DEL	34	12	26	38	26	—	—	—	—	—
2010–11	SC Bern	NLA	1	0	1	1	2	7	1	3	4	27
2011–12	Skellefteå AIK	SEL	51	11	28	39	40	14	5	8	13	22
2012–13	Pelicans	SM-l	13	4	8	12	30	—	—	—	—	—
2012–13	Linköpings HC	SEL	24	2	4	6	48	8	2	2	4	2
2015–16	Île-des-Chênes North Stars	AC	—	—	—	—	—	3	2	3	5	4
AHL totals			448	165	194	359	658	62	22	18	40	67
NHL totals			67	5	4	9	44	5	0	0	0	5
SEL totals			175	50	67	117	355	39	12	10	22	44

== Awards and honors ==
Award	Year
All-WCHA Third Team	1998–99
All-WCHA Second Team	1999–00
AHCA West Second-Team All-American	1999–00
WCHA All-Tournament Team	2000
All-NCAA All-Tournament Team	2000

Awards and achievements
Preceded by Stephen Wagner	WCHA Most Valuable Player in Tournament; 2000	Succeeded by Tyler Arnason
Preceded by Alfie Michaud	NCAA Tournament Most Outstanding Player; 2000	Succeeded by Chuck Kobasew
