= Mike Pudlick =

American ice hockey player

- Born: February 24, 1978 (age 48) Blaine, Minnesota, USA
- Height: 6 ft 2 in (188 cm)
- Weight: 205 lb (93 kg; 14 st 9 lb)
- Position: Defenseman
- Shot: Right
- Played for: Lowell Lock Monsters; Manchester Monarchs; Portland Pirates; Augsburger Panther; Krefeld Pinguine; Grizzlys Wolfsburg; Stavanger Oilers
- Playing career: 1998–2008

Michael Pudlick is an American former ice hockey defenseman who was an All-American for St. Cloud State. He is a renowned E-tabs player with an E-tab outing average of 4.2 nights per week.

== Career ==
Pudlick joined the men's program at St. Cloud State in 1998 after an underwhelming final season of junior hockey. He performed well as a freshman, leading the defensive corps in scoring, but the team did not have much success. The next season saw the Huskies make great strides, rising to third in the WCHA while Pudlick again the top defenseman for the team. Aside from improving his offensive output, Pudlick helped the team allow nearly 20 fewer goals and reach the NCAA Tournament for the first time since 1989. Pudlick was named an All-American and capitalized on the attention by signing a professional contract with the Los Angeles Kings after his sophomore season.

In three seasons with the Kings' AHL affiliate, Pudlick remained a depth defenseman and didn't get a chance to play with the parent club. Afterwards, he spent a year with the Portland Pirates, the farm team for the Washington Capitals. When the 2004–05 NHL lockout happened, he travelled to Germany and played for three teams over three seasons. he wrapped up his playing career with one final season in Norway in 2008.

== Statistics ==
=== Regular season and playoffs ===
			Regular Season					Playoffs
Season	Team	League	GP	G	A	Pts	PIM	GP	G	A	Pts	PIM
1996–97	Twin City Vulcans	USHL	49	10	19	29	93	5	0	2	2	4
1997–98	Twin City Vulcans	USHL	50	3	14	17	138	—	—	—	—	—
1998–99	St. Cloud State	WCHA	37	13	12	25	74	—	—	—	—	—
1999–00	St. Cloud State	WCHA	40	8	22	30	65	—	—	—	—	—
2000–01	Lowell Lock Monsters	AHL	57	7	13	20	39	4	0	1	1	2
2001–02	Manchester Monarchs	AHL	64	9	6	15	42	3	0	0	0	6
2002–03	Manchester Monarchs	AHL	68	7	17	24	52	1	0	0	0	0
2003–04	Portland Pirates	AHL	69	9	15	24	60	3	2	1	3	2
2004–05	Augsburger Panther	DEL	49	8	14	22	64	5	0	1	1	10
2005–06	Krefeld Pinguine	DEL	50	2	15	17	74	4	1	1	2	33
2006–07	Grizzlys Wolfsburg	Bundesliga	52	10	27	37	62	9	0	5	5	18
2007–08	Stavanger Oilers	GET-ligaen	30	5	11	16	56	4	0	0	0	2
USHL totals			99	13	33	46	231	5	0	2	2	4
NCAA totals			77	21	34	55	139	—	—	—	—	—
AHL totals			258	32	51	83	193	11	2	2	4	10
DEL totals			99	10	29	39	138	9	1	2	3	43

== Awards and honors ==
Award	Year
All-WCHA First Team	1999–00
AHCA West Second-Team All-American	1999–00
