= Stephen Wagner =

Canadian ice hockey player

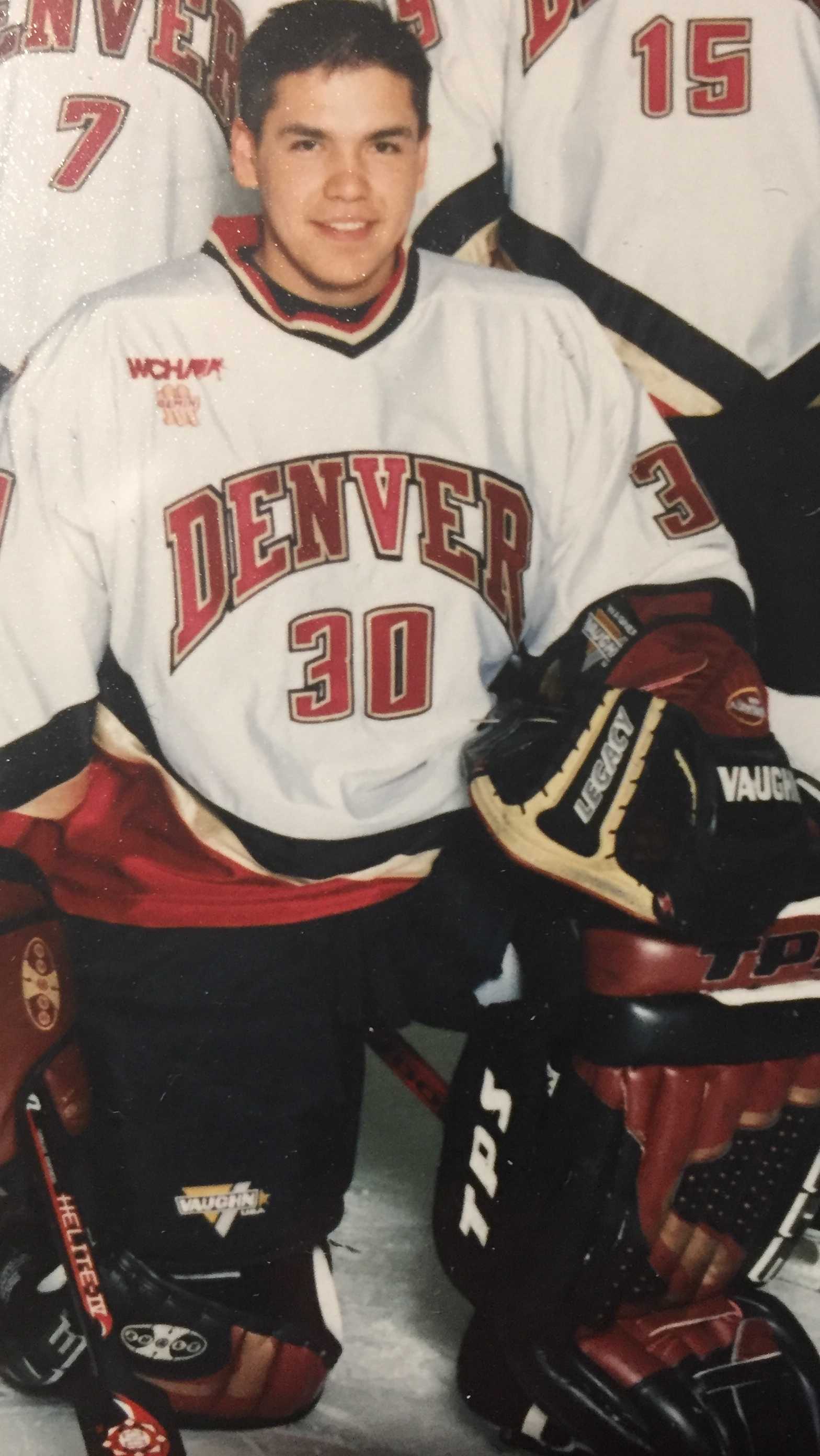
- Born: January 17, 1977 (age 49) Red Deer, Alberta, Canada
- Height: 6 ft 2 in (188 cm)
- Weight: 200 lb (91 kg; 14 st 4 lb)
- Position: Goaltender
- Caught: Right
- Played for: Wichita Thunder (CHL); Fort Wayne Komets (UHL)
- NHL draft: 159th overall, 1996; St. Louis Blues
- Playing career: 2000–2003

Stephen Wagner (born January 17, 1977) is a Canadian former professional ice hockey goaltender who played three seasons for the Wichita Thunder in the Central Hockey League (CHL). He was selected by the St. Louis Blues in the 6th round (159th overall) of the 1996 NHL entry draft.

== Awards and honours ==
Award	Year
WCHA All-Tournament Team	1999

Awards and achievements
Preceded by Joe Bianchi	WCHA Most Valuable Player in Tournament; 1999	Succeeded by Lee Goren
