= Bryan Lundbohm =

American ice hockey player (born 1977)

- Born: August 24, 1977 (age 49) Roseau, Minnesota, USA
- Height: 5 ft 10 in (178 cm)
- Weight: 185 lb (84 kg; 13 st 3 lb)
- Position: Center
- Shot: Left
- Played for: Milwaukee Admirals; HC Sierre; Fort Worth Brahmas; Grand Rapids Griffins; Houston Aeros; KalPa; SønderjyskE Ishockey; Syracuse Crunch; Sparta Warriors
- Playing career: 1998–2010

Bryan Lundbohm is an American former ice hockey coach center who was an All-American for North Dakota.

== Career ==
Lundbohm began attending the University of North Dakota in 1998 after a successful junior career with included winning the Clark Cup in 1997. His first season with the Fighting Sioux was rather disappointing but Lundbohm recovered as a sophomore, scoring four times as many points. That season, Lundbohm helped UND win the national championship, assisting on the first goal in the final game and being named to the All-Tournament team. For his junior season, Lundbohm raised his scoring numbers even more and finished second in the nation, behind only teammate and Hobey Baker Award-finalist Jeff Panzer. He was named to the All-American team and again was part of a fantastic Fighting Sioux team. North Dakota reached the national final for the second year in a row but got down 0–2 after two periods. Lundbohm assisted on two goals in the final 4 minutes of regulation and sent the game into overtime. Unfortunately, Boston College netted the final goal, preventing a UND repeat.

Lundbohm left after his junior season and signed professionally with the Milwaukee Admirals. He played two seasons with the club but didn't seem to be getting any traction so he headed to Europe in 2003. His stay lasted just 10 games before he returned to Milwaukee and finished out the year with his best production to date. His season was ended prematurely by a pec injury in January, preventing him from playing for the club in its championship run. The next season saw a logjam in the minor leagues as a result of the NHL lockout. Coming off the injury, Lundbohm attended the Cleveland Barons' training camp but ended up starting the year with the Fort Worth Brahmas. He averaged over a point per game for the club before being called up to the AHL. He eventually found his way back to Milwaukee for his third stint with the team and produced moderate numbers.

In 2005 he signed with the Houston Aeros and settled into a checking role with the team. After his second one-year contract expired, Lundbohm made a second attempt in Europe. He appeared briefly for KalPa before finishing the year out in Denmark and then rejoined Houston. Now in his early 30s, Lundbohm's offensive production was declining but he was able to play in most of the team's games, helping them reach the conference finals. The next season, Lundbohm went scoreless in 11 games with the Syracuse Crunch and then finished the year in Norway before hanging up his skates.

After retiring, Lundbohm returned home to Roseau and began working as a tax accountant.

== Personal life ==
Bryan's younger brother David also played college hockey at North Dakota. The two of them played together in 2000–01.

== Statistics ==
=== Regular season and playoffs ===
			Regular Season					Playoffs
Season	Team	League	GP	G	A	Pts	PIM	GP	G	A	Pts	PIM
1996–97	Lincoln Stars	USHL	52	12	33	45	33	14	8	4	12	20
1997–98	Lincoln Stars	USHL	55	26	38	64	10	9	2	7	9	0
1998–99	North Dakota	WCHA	32	2	9	11	4	—	—	—	—	—
1999–00	North Dakota	WCHA	44	22	22	44	14	—	—	—	—	—
2000–01	North Dakota	WCHA	46	32	37	69	38	—	—	—	—	—
2001–02	Milwaukee Admirals	AHL	79	11	23	34	63	—	—	—	—	—
2002–03	Milwaukee Admirals	AHL	80	9	17	26	63	6	1	5	6	0
2003–04	HC Sierre	NLB	10	6	8	14	0	—	—	—	—	—
2003–04	Milwaukee Admirals	AHL	28	6	8	14	0	—	—	—	—	—
2004–05	Fort Worth Brahmas	CHL	26	10	20	30	28	—	—	—	—	—
2004–05	Grand Rapids Griffins	AHL	3	0	0	0	0	—	—	—	—	—
2004–05	Milwaukee Admirals	AHL	47	7	12	19	36	4	0	0	0	0
2005–06	Houston Aeros	AHL	78	9	21	30	46	8	3	5	8	4
2006–07	Houston Aeros	AHL	77	9	21	30	34	—	—	—	—	—
2007–08	KalPa	SM-liiga	5	0	1	1	0	—	—	—	—	—
2007–08	SønderjyskE Ishockey	AL-Bank Ligaen	33	13	14	27	12	—	—	—	—	—
2008–09	Houston Aeros	AHL	50	5	7	12	19	17	1	3	4	6
2009–10	Syracuse Crunch	AHL	11	0	0	0	8	—	—	—	—	—
2009–10	Sparta Warriors	GET-ligaen	20	7	6	13	18	12	3	3	6	6
USHL totals			107	38	71	109	43	23	10	11	21	20
NCAA totals			122	56	68	124	56	—	—	—	—	—
AHL totals			453	56	109	165	277	35	5	13	18	10

== Awards and honors ==
Award	Year
All-NCAA All-Tournament Team	2000, 2001
All-WCHA First Team	2000–01
AHCA East Second-Team All-American	2000–01
