= Mike Commodore =

Canadian ice hockey player (born 1979)

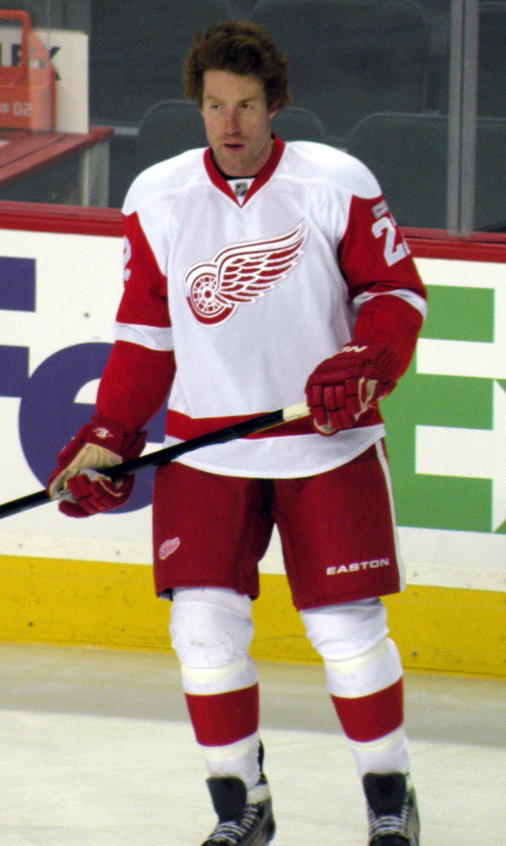
- Commodore with the Detroit Red Wings in 2012
- Born: November 7, 1979 (age 46) Fort Saskatchewan, Alberta, Canada
- Height: 6 ft 4 in (193 cm)
- Weight: 227 lb (103 kg; 16 st 3 lb)
- Position: Defence
- Shot: Right
- Played for: New Jersey Devils; Calgary Flames; Carolina Hurricanes; Ottawa Senators; Columbus Blue Jackets; Detroit Red Wings; Tampa Bay Lightning; Admiral Vladivostok
- National team: Canada
- NHL draft: 42nd overall, 1999; New Jersey Devils
- Playing career: 2000–2014

Michael W. Commodore (born November 7, 1979) is a Canadian former professional ice hockey defenceman. Commodore played for several teams in the National Hockey League (NHL). In 2006, he won the Stanley Cup as part of the Carolina Hurricanes. Commodore was selected by the New Jersey Devils in the second round (42nd overall) of the 1999 NHL entry draft. Commodore is a host of the Clearing the Crease podcast.

== Playing career ==
Commodore played his collegiate years at the University of North Dakota Fighting Sioux, playing three years and winning the NCAA Championship in 2000. He was drafted 42nd overall by the New Jersey Devils in the 1999 NHL entry draft. He was traded to the Anaheim Ducks and then to the Calgary Flames, playing in the 2004 Stanley Cup Final. Calgary's depth on the blue line left no place for Commodore in the regular lineup, and he was traded to the Carolina Hurricanes prior to the start of the 2005–06 NHL season. Commodore and the Hurricanes ended up becoming NHL champions at the 2006 Stanley Cup Final.

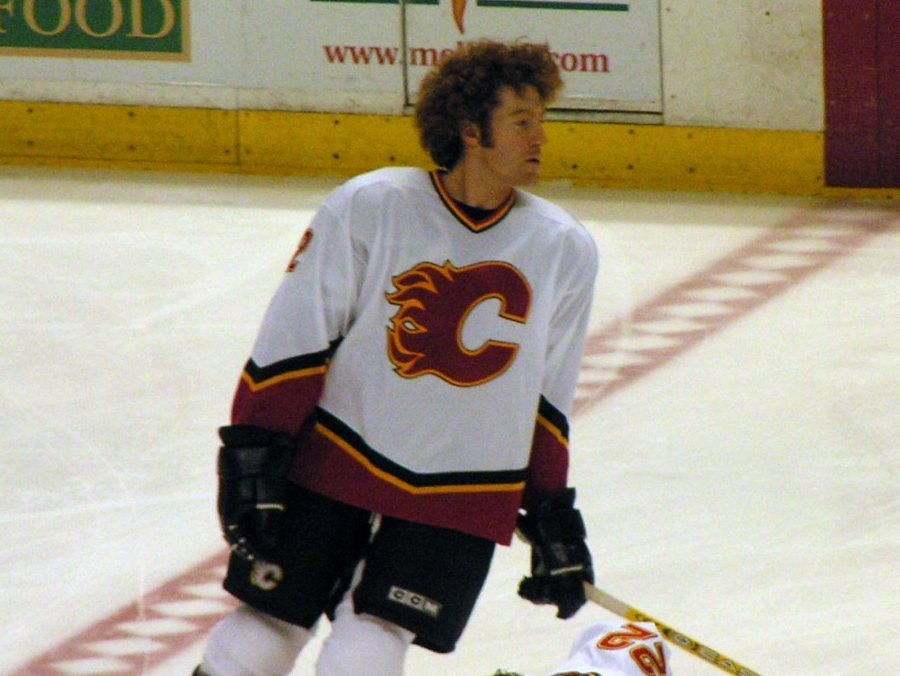
Mike Commodore of the Calgary Flames skates in a pre-game warm-up during the 2003-04 season

During both final runs, Commodore became noted for his red playoff beard and afro hair. As the Hurricanes were received at the White House in 2006, president George W. Bush joked that "I'm not sure what is prettier, the Stanley Cup, or Mike Commodore's hair." Both times Commodore followed the finals having his hair shaved for organizations which helped the Jimmy V Foundation cancer research. The first time he had his hair shaved was at his mother's former school, Fort High. The second time, Commodore held ten eBay auctions for the highest bidders which would allow them to have a chance to shave his head and keep his hair. During the 2006 playoffs, Commodore also had fans copying a bathrobe he wore before the pre-game skate.

Along with Rhett Warrener, he played a role in Paul Brandt's music video, "Convoy", as a truck driver.

In the 2006-07 regular season, Commodore tied Mike Komisarek of the Montreal Canadiens for most shorthanded goals scored among defensemen, with two.

He was a member of the 2007 Canadian IIHF World Championship team that won gold in a 4–2 win against Finland in Moscow.

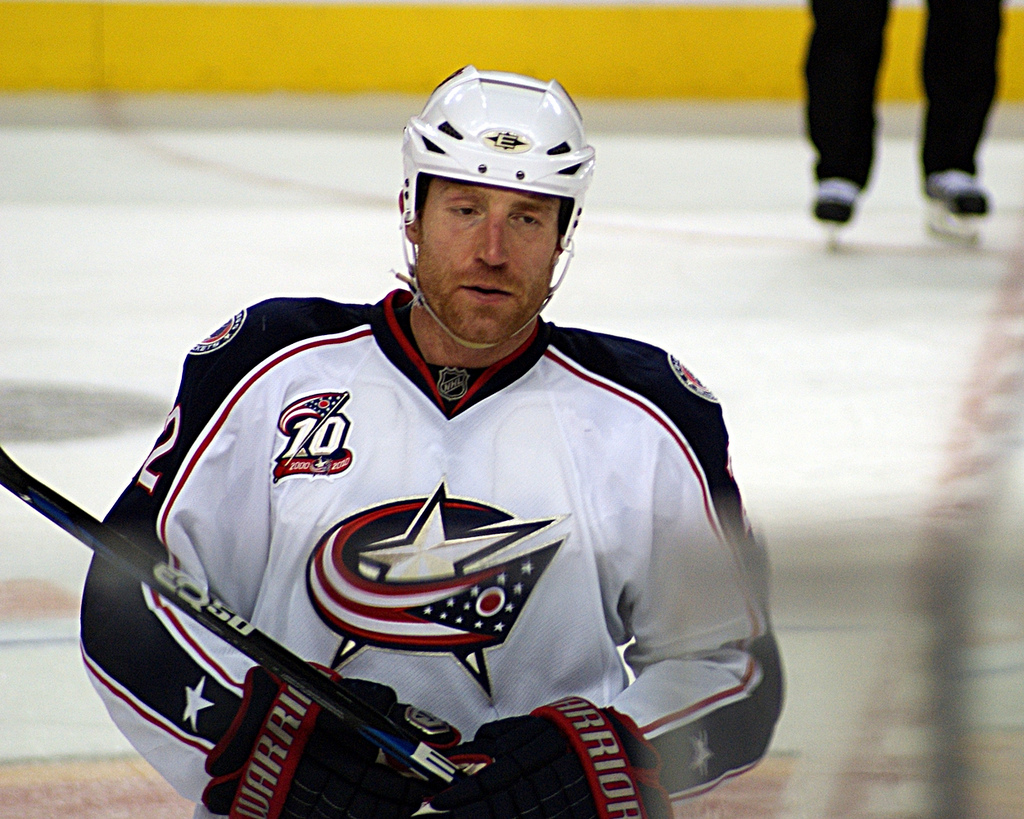
Commodore with the Columbus Blue Jackets in 2010.

On February 11, 2008, Commodore was dealt to the Ottawa Senators along with Cory Stillman from Carolina for Joe Corvo and Patrick Eaves.

Commodore was signed as an unrestricted free agent by the Columbus Blue Jackets on July 1, 2008 to a five-year contract worth $18.75 million. He scored five goals as well as adding 19 assists during his first season in Columbus that saw the Blue Jackets appear in their first ever Stanley Cup Playoff series against the Detroit Red Wings, which Detroit won in a 4-0 sweep. Commodore recorded 18 penalty minutes during the series.

Commodore cleared waivers on January 17, 2011, and was assigned to the Springfield Falcons of the AHL.

The Detroit Red Wings signed Commodore to a one-year contract worth $1 million on July 1, 2011. After signing, Commodore was offered to pick his own jersey number, which incited several Internet petitions to suggest the number 64, in reference to the Commodore 64. The idea was supported by both the team and Commodore himself, but he decided against it.

On February 27, 2012, Commodore was traded to the Tampa Bay Lightning for a conditional seventh-round draft pick after playing only 17 games for Detroit.

With the 2012 NHL lockout affecting his free agent status, Commodore was signed to a professional try-out contract midway into the 2012–13 season on November 20, 2012. He was released on January 23, 2013.

Commodore played in the Kontinental Hockey League during the 2013–14 season.

== Personal ==
Commodore has a brother, Matt, who also briefly played junior hockey with the Alberta Junior Hockey League Fort Saskatchewan Traders during the 2000-01 season. Politically, Commodore opposes Prime Minister Justin Trudeau. In particular, Commodore has been critical of Trudeau's handling of the COVID-19 pandemic and Trudeau's economic policy.

As of 2017, Commodore occasionally works as an Uber driver.

== Feud with Mike Babcock ==
Commodore has been very open over his disapproval of former Columbus Blue Jackets, Toronto Maple Leafs, Detroit Red Wings, Mighty Ducks of Anaheim, and current Edmonton Oilers head coach Mike Babcock. Commodore has stated he was "screwed over" by Babcock while with the Cincinnati Mighty Ducks of the AHL, claiming Babcock refused to play him in favour of new addition Kurt Sauer. The relationship worsened nine years later, after Commodore signed with the Red Wings, who Babcock was coaching. Commodore states this signing is what ended his career in the NHL. Commodore claimed that Babcock misled him by telling him he was wanted as a physical presence; Commodore remained a healthy scratch for a month and a half to start the season before playing in two games, and was then scratched again until December, only reentering the line up when, according to Commodore, Red Wings general manager Ken Holland ordered Babcock to play him. Commodore would go on to say he was traded out of Detroit "because Holland felt bad [for me]", referring to his lack of playing time. Commodore (along with Hall of Fame defenseman Chris Chelios) also held against Babcock the fact that he healthy scratched Mike Modano when he had 1,499 games played. Modano retired following that season and never reached the 1,500 games played milestone. Commodore frequently uses Twitter hashtag "#FuckBabs" in his tweet, a slogan he created.

Following his retirement, Commodore has lashed out at Babcock multiple times, particularly on Twitter where he constantly refers to the coach as a "piece of shit." Commodore has also said he hopes Babcock "gets hit by a truck."

Commodore engaged in a notable Twitter rant on November 20, 2019, expressing glee at Babcock's firing from the Maple Leafs earlier that day.

Babcock addressed Commodore's criticisms in an appearance on Cam Janssen's podcast in March, 2021, stating that Commodore was scratched because he did not perform better than other defenders on the 2011 team (he did not recall much interacting with Commodore in Anaheim), and refuted that Commodore was scratched because of a personal vendetta. Commodore rejected this in a Tweet, saying Babcock 'said the exact opposite on the phone July 1, 2011 you piece of shit.'

In July 2026, Commodore put up a post on X in which he said in his opinion Babcock was a scumbag and heavily implied Babcock was a pedophile in saying about Babcock "don't leave your kids alone with him."

== Career statistics ==
=== Regular season and playoffs ===
			Regular season					Playoffs
Season	Team	League	GP	G	A	Pts	PIM	GP	G	A	Pts	PIM
1996–97	Fort Saskatchewan Traders	AJHL	51	3	8	11	244	—	—	—	—	—
1997–98	North Dakota Fighting Sioux	WCHA	29	0	5	5	74	—	—	—	—	—
1998–99	North Dakota Fighting Sioux	WCHA	39	5	8	13	154	—	—	—	—	—
1999–00	North Dakota Fighting Sioux	WCHA	38	5	7	12	154	—	—	—	—	—
2000–01	Albany River Rats	AHL	41	2	5	7	59	—	—	—	—	—
2000–01	New Jersey Devils	NHL	20	1	4	5	14	—	—	—	—	—
2001–02	Albany River Rats	AHL	14	0	3	3	31	—	—	—	—	—
2001–02	New Jersey Devils	NHL	37	0	1	1	30	—	—	—	—	—
2002–03	Cincinnati Mighty Ducks	AHL	61	2	9	11	210	—	—	—	—	—
2002–03	Saint John Flames	AHL	7	0	3	3	18	—	—	—	—	—
2002–03	Calgary Flames	NHL	6	0	1	1	19	—	—	—	—	—
2003–04	Lowell Lock Monsters	AHL	37	5	11	16	75	—	—	—	—	—
2003–04	Calgary Flames	NHL	12	0	0	0	25	20	0	2	2	19
2004–05	Lowell Lock Monsters	AHL	73	6	29	35	175	11	1	2	3	18
2005–06	Carolina Hurricanes	NHL	72	3	10	13	138	25	2	2	4	33
2006–07	Carolina Hurricanes	NHL	82	7	22	29	113	—	—	—	—	—
2007–08	Carolina Hurricanes	NHL	41	3	9	12	74	—	—	—	—	—
2007–08	Ottawa Senators	NHL	26	0	2	2	26	4	0	2	2	0
2008–09	Columbus Blue Jackets	NHL	81	5	19	24	100	4	0	0	0	18
2009–10	Columbus Blue Jackets	NHL	57	2	9	11	62	—	—	—	—	—
2010–11	Columbus Blue Jackets	NHL	20	2	4	6	44	—	—	—	—	—
2010–11	Springfield Falcons	AHL	11	0	2	2	20	—	—	—	—	—
2011–12	Detroit Red Wings	NHL	17	0	2	2	21	—	—	—	—	—
2011–12	Tampa Bay Lightning	NHL	13	0	0	0	17	—	—	—	—	—
2012–13	Hamilton Bulldogs	AHL	17	0	2	2	26	—	—	—	—	—
2012–13	Texas Stars	AHL	5	2	0	2	4	1	0	0	0	0
2013–14	Admiral Vladivostok	KHL	27	2	2	4	20	4	1	1	2	6
NHL totals			484	23	83	106	683	53	2	6	8	70

Medal record

Representing Canada

Ice hockey

World Championships
Gold medal – first place	2007 Moscow	

=== International ===
Year	Team	Event	Result	GP	G	A	Pts	PIM
2007	Canada	WC	1st place, gold medalist(s)	9	0	2	2	14
Senior totals				9	0	2	2	14

== Awards and honors ==
Award	Year
College
All-NCAA All-Tournament Team	2000
NHL
Stanley Cup (Carolina Hurricanes)	2006
