= Ryan Bayda =

Canadian ice hockey player (born 1980)

- Born: December 9, 1980 (age 45) Saskatoon, Saskatchewan, Canada
- Height: 5 ft 11 in (180 cm)
- Weight: 185 lb (84 kg; 13 st 3 lb)
- Position: Left wing
- Shot: Left
- Played for: Carolina Hurricanes; Thomas Sabo Ice Tigers; Augsburger Panther; Straubing Tigers
- NHL draft: 80th overall, 2000; Carolina Hurricanes
- Playing career: 2002–2016

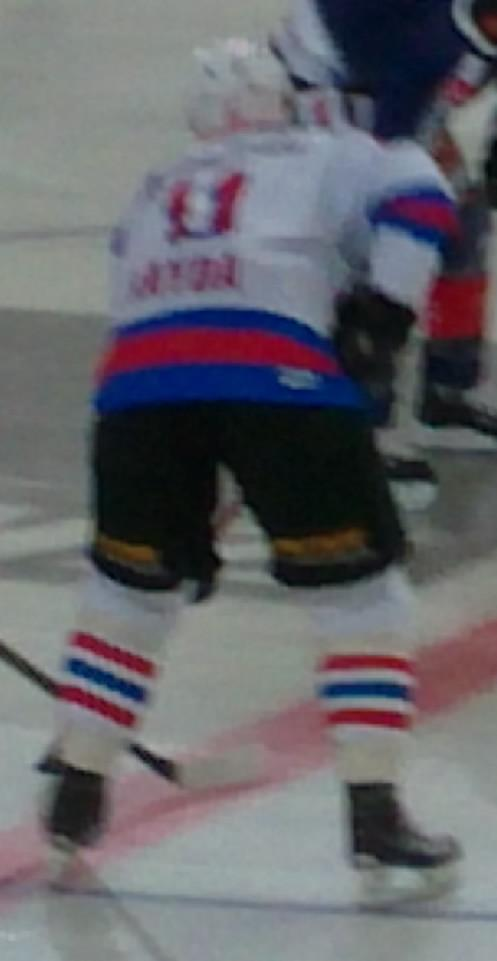
Barda in 2010

Ryan G. Bayda (born December 9, 1980) is a Canadian former professional ice hockey left winger, who played 179 games in the National Hockey League (NHL).

== Playing career ==
Bayda was drafted in the third round, 80th overall by the Carolina Hurricanes in the 2000 NHL entry draft. He joined the Hurricanes' AHL affiliate known as the Lowell Lock Monsters, at the end of the 2001–02 season, scoring a goal and an assist in three regular season games and also scoring three goals in five playoff games. He made his NHL debut for Carolina, during the 2002–03 NHL season. Bayda scored his first career NHL goal against Ed Belfour and the Toronto Maple Leafs on February 18, 2003, in a 4-3 Hurricanes loss.

On July 3, 2007, the Hurricanes re-signed Bayda to a one-year, $475,000 contract. This is a two-way contract which also paid him $100,000 at the AHL level.

On July 1, 2008, the Hurricanes re-signed Bayda to a one-year, $475,000 contract for the 2008-09 season. Bayda in his first full NHL season, played a career-high of 70 games and helped the Hurricanes reach the Eastern Conference finals. During the finals on May 22, 2009, Bayda was fined $2,500 as a result of a match penalty. He was assessed for cross-checking Pittsburgh Penguins defenseman Kris Letang in the chin, at the end of game 2 of the Eastern Conference Finals.

On September 3, 2009, Bayda was invited to the St. Louis Blues training camp for the 2009-10 season. Ryan, however, turned down the offer after the Blues signed forward Derek Armstrong and accepted an invitation to the Pittsburgh Penguins training camp instead.

On July 12, 2013, after three seasons with the Nürnberg Ice Tigers of the Deutsche Eishockey Liga (DEL) in Germany, Bayda left as a free agent to join DEL rivals Augsburger Panther on a one-year deal.

In the following 2014–15 season, Bayda was limited to just 6 games, in which he produced 10 points, due to a serious elbow injury. As the season ended, Bayda left as a free agent again and signed a one-year contract with fellow DEL club, the Straubing Tigers on March 26, 2015.

He retired upon the conclusion of the 2015–16 season with the Straubing Tigers and returned to his home town of Saskatoon, where he opened a tattoo removal business.

== Career statistics ==
			Regular season					Playoffs
Season	Team	League	GP	G	A	Pts	PIM	GP	G	A	Pts	PIM
1996–97	Saskatoon Contacts AAA	SMHL	44	22	23	45	18	—	—	—	—	—
1997–98	Saskatoon Contacts AAA	SMHL	41	29	49	78	100	—	—	—	—	—
1998–99	Vernon Vipers	BCHL	45	24	58	82	15	14	12	20	32	8
1999–2000	University of North Dakota	WCHA	44	17	23	40	30	—	—	—	—	—
2000–01	University of North Dakota	WCHA	46	25	34	59	48	—	—	—	—	—
2001–02	University of North Dakota	WCHA	37	19	28	47	52	—	—	—	—	—
2001–02	Lowell Lock Monsters	AHL	3	1	1	2	0	5	3	0	3	0
2002–03	Lowell Lock Monsters	AHL	53	11	32	43	32	—	—	—	—	—
2002–03	Carolina Hurricanes	NHL	25	4	10	14	16	—	—	—	—	—
2003–04	Lowell Lock Monsters	AHL	34	7	15	22	28	—	—	—	—	—
2003–04	Carolina Hurricanes	NHL	44	3	3	6	22	—	—	—	—	—
2004–05	Lowell Lock Monsters	AHL	80	13	27	40	91	9	3	3	6	4
2005–06	Manitoba Moose	AHL	59	13	25	38	52	13	1	6	7	27
2006–07	Albany River Rats	AHL	55	29	25	54	66	5	3	2	5	4
2006–07	Carolina Hurricanes	NHL	9	1	1	2	2	—	—	—	—	—
2007–08	Albany River Rats	AHL	21	7	10	17	6	—	—	—	—	—
2007–08	Carolina Hurricanes	NHL	31	3	3	6	28	—	—	—	—	—
2008–09	Carolina Hurricanes	NHL	70	5	7	12	26	15	2	2	4	18
2009–10	Wilkes–Barre/Scranton Penguins	AHL	21	8	3	11	14	—	—	—	—	—
2010–11	Thomas Sabo Ice Tigers	DEL	52	17	24	41	70	2	1	0	1	0
2011–12	Thomas Sabo Ice Tigers	DEL	15	1	1	2	6	—	—	—	—	—
2012–13	Thomas Sabo Ice Tigers	DEL	50	9	22	31	36	3	0	0	0	2
2013–14	Augsburger Panther	DEL	49	18	23	41	36	—	—	—	—	—
2014–15	Augsburger Panther	DEL	6	4	6	10	6	—	—	—	—	—
2015–16	Straubing Tigers	DEL	44	13	13	26	49	6	0	1	1	0
AHL totals			326	89	138	227	289	32	10	11	21	35
NHL totals			179	16	24	40	94	15	2	2	4	18
DEL totals			216	62	89	151	203	11	0	2	2	2

== Awards and honors ==
Award	Year
BCHL Rookie of the Year	1999
All-WCHA Rookie Team	1999–00
WCHA All-Tournament Team	2000
All-WCHA Second team	2000–01
All-WCHA Second team	2001–02
