= Jason Ulmer =

Canadian ice hockey player

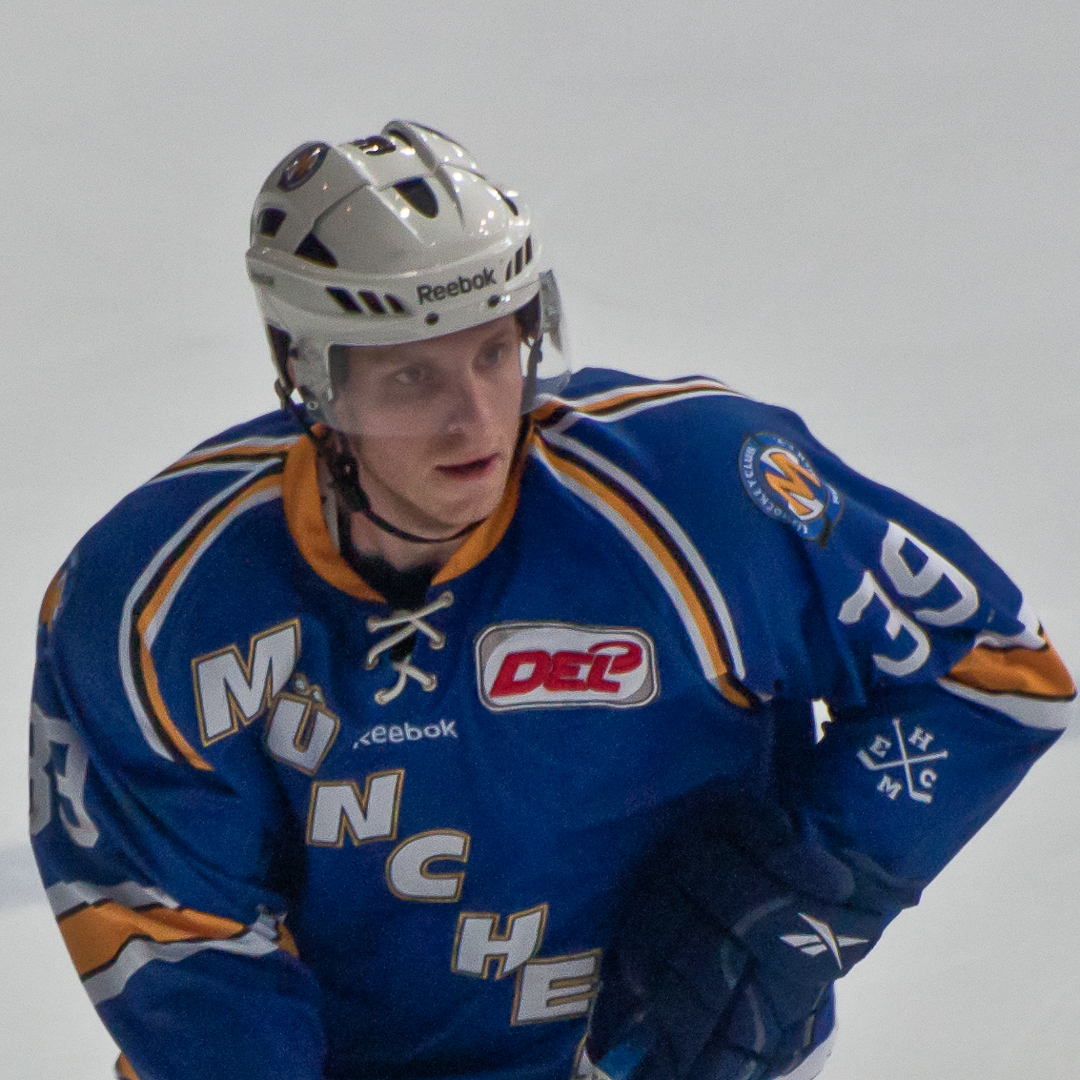
- Born: December 20, 1978 (age 47) Wilcox, Saskatchewan, Canada
- Height: 5 ft 11 in (180 cm)
- Weight: 194 lb (88 kg; 13 st 12 lb)
- Position: Centre
- Shot: Right
- Played for: Hershey Bears; Portland Pirates; Lukko Rauma; Kassel Huskies; Hannover Scorpions; EHC Wolfsburg; EHC München; EHC Black Wings Linz
- NHL draft: Undrafted
- Playing career: 2000–2016
- Coaching career

Biographical details
- Education: University of North Dakota

Coaching career (HC unless noted)
- 2016–2018: North Dakota (manager)
- 2019–2023: North Dakota (volunteer assistant)

Jason Ulmer (born December 20, 1978) is a Canadian former professional ice hockey player. He ast played for EHC Black Wings Linz of the Austrian Hockey League (EBEL). He previously played with EHC München in the Deutsche Eishockey Liga (DEL). On June 20, 2013, out of contract with München after the 2012–13 season, Ulmer signed a one-year contract with EHC Black Wings Linz of the Neighbouring Austrian Hockey League. At the conclusion of the 2015-16 season, his third campaign with the Black Wings, Ulmer announced his retirement from professional hockey on April 2, 2016.

== Career statistics ==
			Regular season					Playoffs
Season	Team	League	GP	G	A	Pts	PIM	GP	G	A	Pts	PIM
1995–96	Notre Dame Hounds	SJHL	64	33	47	80	51	—	—	—	—	—
1996–97	University of North Dakota	NCAA	32	3	5	8	12	—	—	—	—	—
1997–98	University of North Dakota	NCAA	33	6	10	16	12	—	—	—	—	—
1998–99	University of North Dakota	NCAA	37	6	15	21	43	—	—	—	—	—
1999–00	University of North Dakota	NCAA	44	18	39	57	33	—	—	—	—	—
2000–01	Quad City Mallards	UHL	60	26	71	97	40	12	8	13	21	2
2000–01	Milwaukee Admirals	IHL	6	1	0	1	4	—	—	—	—	—
2000–01	Hershey Bears	AHL	3	0	0	0	2	—	—	—	—	—
2000–01	Portland Pirates	AHL	5	1	2	3	0	—	—	—	—	—
2001–02	Quad City Mallards	UHL	2	3	2	5	0	—	—	—	—	—
2001–02	Portland Pirates	AHL	73	11	21	32	18	—	—	—	—	—
2002–03	Lukko	SM-liiga	56	12	17	29	34	—	—	—	—	—
2003–04	Portland Pirates	AHL	80	17	24	41	26	7	2	3	5	2
2004–05	Portland Pirates	AHL	54	5	9	14	22	—	—	—	—	—
2005–06	Kassel Huskies	DEL	52	19	33	52	42	—	—	—	—	—
2006–07	Hannover Scorpions	DEL	52	11	20	31	52	6	0	0	0	2
2007–08	Grizzly Adams Wolfsburg	DEL	50	15	31	46	68	—	—	—	—	—
2008–09	Grizzly Adams Wolfsburg	DEL	52	17	47	64	54	10	1	6	7	6
2009–10	Grizzly Adams Wolfsburg	DEL	55	10	38	48	50	7	1	6	7	4
2010–11	Grizzly Adams Wolfsburg	DEL	50	7	33	40	22	9	0	9	9	6
2011–12	EHC München	DEL	51	15	21	36	44	—	—	—	—	—
2012–13	EHC München	DEL	42	4	27	31	26	—	—	—	—	—
2013–14	Black Wings Linz	EBEL	54	16	41	57	24	8	3	6	9	8
2014–15	Black Wings Linz	EBEL	54	19	28	47	30	12	7	5	12	4
2015–16	Black Wings Linz	EBEL	37	10	19	29	14	12	3	3	6	8
AHL totals			215	34	56	90	68	7	2	3	5	2
DEL totals			404	98	250	348	358	32	2	21	23	18

== Awards and honors ==
Award	Year
All-WCHA Third Team	1999–00
