= Scott Meyer (ice hockey) =

American ice hockey player and coach

Scott Meyer (born April 10, 1976) is an American former ice hockey player and coach who was the head coach and general manager of the Minnesota Magicians of the North American Hockey League. Meyer was also an ownership partner of the Minnesota Junior Hockey Group, which owns and operates the Magicians.

== Career ==
Meyer was a goalie during his playing career (1994–2004) for several teams in the NAHL, USHL, WCHA, ECHL, and AHL. Following his senior season at St. Cloud State University (2000–01) he was named to the NCAA Division I All-American Second Team and to the All-WCHA First Team. During the 2001–02 season, Meyer served briefly as a backup goaltender for the New York Rangers, but did not appear in a game.

Before his coaching tenure with the Minnesota Magicians, Meyer also served as an assistant coach for the Cedar Rapids RoughRiders and for Hamline University. Meyer is also owner and co-founder of Exceed Hockey Group, LLC. an organization that operates hockey training centers and development programs and clinics, as well as several Tier III junior farm teams for the Minnesota Magicians: Chicago Jr. Bulldogs (NA3HL), College Station Spirit (NA3HL), and the River Falls Renegades (USPHL). The Minnesota Junior Hockey Group would eventually sell or fold the Tier III teams.

When the NAHL announced that the Minnesota Magicians were granted membership to the league in late 2012, Meyer was an ownership partner of the Minnesota Junior Hockey Group, which owns and operates the Magicians. In November 2017, Meyer was replaced in his role as general manager with the Magicians and then was replaced as head coach in December. As of December 2018, the Magicians no longer identify him as a member of the team's ownership group.

== Awards and honors ==
Award	Year
All-WCHA First Team	2000–01
AHCA West Second-Team All-American	2000–01
