= 1996–97 North Dakota Fighting Sioux men's ice hockey season =

National champion WCHA, co-champion WCHA tournament, champion NCAA tournament, champion
- Conference: T–1st WCHA
- Home ice: Ralph Engelstad Arena

Record
- Overall: 31–10–2
- Conference: 21–10–1
- Home: 16–2–2
- Road: 10–8–0
- Neutral: 5–0–0

Coaches and captains
- Head coach: Dean Blais
- Assistant coaches: Mark Osiecki; Scott Sandelin
- Captain: Dane Litke
- Alternate captain(s): Kevin Hoogsteen; Mark Pivetz

The 1996–97 North Dakota Fighting Sioux men's ice hockey team represented the University of North Dakota in college ice hockey during the 1996–97 NCAA Division I men's ice hockey season. In its 3rd year under head coach Dean Blais the team compiled a 31–10–2 record and reached the NCAA tournament for the thirteenth time. The Fighting Sioux defeated Boston University 6–4 to win the championship game at the Bradley Center in Milwaukee, Wisconsin.

== Season ==
North Dakota entered the year with very few expectations. The team had only one winning season in the previous five years, had only two NHL draft picks on the roster, and was seven years removed from its last NCAA tournament appearance. They had been improving under 3rd-year coach Dean Blais, but the team had yet to regain the prominence that the Fighting Sioux once possessed.

=== Fast start ===
While they were picked to finish 5th in the WCHA by the preseason coaches poll, the Sioux open with a six-game winning streak, albeit against fairly weak competition. Their progress was stymied when they headed to Minneapolis and lost both games to the Golden Gophers. UND split the following two weekends before finally recovering with a pair of wins over Minnesota–Duluth.

=== Mid-season stumble ===
The Fighting Sioux won most of their games around the winter break, but when they returned to their conference schedule, they couldn't find any consistency. North Dakota split three consecutive weekends in January and headed into the final weekend of the month, hoping to recover their defensive game. League-leading Minnesota was hardly the ideal opponent for North Dakota, but two wins over the Gophers tied the season series and set up the possibility that UND could win the WCHA title.

North Dakota went 5–1 over the next three weeks, extending their lead over Minnesota to 4 points. All the Fighting Sioux had to do in the final weekend was earn a single point against Denver, and they would guarantee the regular season title for themselves. The Pioneers, however, had other ideas. North Dakota lost both games while Minnesota won both of theirs, leaving the two teams tied with identical conference records. While North Dakota had to share the conference title with the Gophers, they won the tie-breaker between the two and were awarded the top seed in the WCHA tournament.

=== Conference tournament ===
North Dakota opened with two relatively easy home wins over Michigan Tech and advanced to the semifinals at the St. Paul Civic Center. After another comfortable win over Colorado College, North Dakota met Minnesota in the championship, and the two teams fought a pitched battle for conference supremacy. The two teams fought back and forth all night, ending regulation knotted at 3–3. It didn't take long to end the game once overtime began when 4th-liner Peter Armbrust fired a rebound into the net at 2:17 to win the championship.

=== NCAA tournament ===
The conference title gave North Dakota the second western seed, allowing them to bypass the first round and begin the tournament in the quarterfinal round. They promptly took out ECAC champion Cornell and advanced to the Frozen Four. In the national semifinal, North Dakota swiftly built a 3–0 lead on Colorado College. The Tigers responded with two goals to get back into the game, but a pair of Fighting Sioux markers 43 seconds apart ended CC's hopes, and UND was heading to the championship game.

In the final, Boston University got the jump early, scoring twice in the first. North Dakota was able to turn the game into a track meet in the second and tie the game by the mid-way point. In the 12th minute, Peter Donatelli drew a controversial penalty, giving BU a power play, but it was UND's Matt Henderson who was able to score on the disadvantage. The Terriers tied the game on a separate power play shortly thereafter. UND regained the lead with their own extra-man goal two minutes later and added a fifth goal just before the period ended.

With a two-goal lead, North Dakota played a much more defensive-minded game in the third period. They were able to hold the Terriers off the scoresheet until the final minute but a goal by Jon Coleman cut the lead to one with less than a minute to play. BU attempted to gain control of the puck inside the Sioux end for a chance to tie the game but UND was able to clear the zone and Adam Calder sent the puck into an empty net for the final goal of North Dakota's championship season.

=== Awards and honors ===
Matt Henderson's five points in the Frozen Four earned him the Tournament MOP as well as a place on the All-Tournament team with teammates David Hoogsteen, Curtis Murphy and Aaron Schweitzer. Hoogsteen and Murphy were also named to the AHCA All-American West Second Team. Both players were joined by Jason Blake on the All-WCHA First Team while Dean Blais was awarded both the WCHA Coach of the Year and the Spencer Penrose Award as the national coach of the year.

The surprise win by North Dakota in 1997 marked the beginning of a nearly unbroken 20-year stretch where the program reached the NCAA tournament. In that time, they appeared in 10 Frozen Fours and won an additional two National championships.

== Standings ==
1996–97 Western Collegiate Hockey Association standings
	Conference							Overall					
	GP	W	L	T	PTS	GF	GA	GP	W	L	T	GF	GA
North Dakota†*	32	21	10	1	43	137	105	43	31	10	2	190	130
Minnesota†	32	21	10	1	43	129	94	42	28	13	1	179	128
St. Cloud State	32	18	10	4	40	127	105	40	23	13	4	152	130
Colorado College	32	17	11	4	38	121	107	44	25	15	4	169	141
Denver	32	17	11	4	38	127	99	41	24	13	4	163	122
Minnesota-Duluth	32	15	13	4	34	115	111	38	18	16	4	133	131
Wisconsin	32	15	15	2	32	115	115	38	15	21	2	132	151
Northern Michigan	32	9	21	2	20	78	127	40	13	24	3	108	152
Alaska-Anchorage	32	7	21	4	18	75	109	36	9	23	4	86	126
Michigan Tech	32	5	23	4	14	81	133	39	8	27	4	98	155
Championship: North Dakota † indicates conference regular season champion * indicates conference tournament champion Final rankings: USA Today/American Hockey Magazine Coaches Poll Top 10 Poll

== Schedule ==
Date	Opponent^{#}	Rank^{#}	Site	Result	Record
Exhibition
October 11	vs. Alberta*		Ralph Engelstad Arena • Grand Forks, North Dakota (Exhibition)	L 1–2	
Regular season
October 18	vs. Denver		Ralph Engelstad Arena • Grand Forks, North Dakota	W 3–2 ^{OT}	1–0 (1–0)
October 19	vs. Denver		Ralph Engelstad Arena • Grand Forks, North Dakota	W 6–2	2–0 (2–0)
October 25	at Michigan Tech		MacInnes Student Ice Arena • Houghton, Michigan	W 7–3	3–0 (3–0)
October 26	at Michigan Tech		MacInnes Student Ice Arena • Houghton, Michigan	W 4–3	4–0 (4–0)
November 1	vs. Northern Michigan		Ralph Engelstad Arena • Grand Forks, North Dakota	W 3–2	5–0 (5–0)
November 2	vs. Northern Michigan		Ralph Engelstad Arena • Grand Forks, North Dakota	W 5–0	6–0 (6–0)
November 8	at Minnesota		Mariucci Arena • Minneapolis, Minnesota	L 2–3	6–1 (6–1)
November 9	at Minnesota		Mariucci Arena • Minneapolis, Minnesota	L 6–10	6–2 (6–2)
November 15	vs. St. Cloud State		Ralph Engelstad Arena • Grand Forks, North Dakota	L 2–5	6–3 (6–3)
November 16	vs. St. Cloud State		Ralph Engelstad Arena • Grand Forks, North Dakota	W 5–3	7–3 (7–3)
November 22	at Alaska–Anchorage		Sullivan Arena • Anchorage, Alaska	L 2–3	7–4 (7–4)
November 23	at Alaska–Anchorage		Sullivan Arena • Anchorage, Alaska	W 5–3	8–4 (8–4)
November 29	at Minnesota–Duluth		Duluth Arena Auditorium • Duluth, Minnesota	W 8–4	9–4 (9–4)
November 30	at Minnesota–Duluth		Duluth Arena Auditorium • Duluth, Minnesota	W 4–3	10–4 (10–4)
December 6	vs. Colorado College		Ralph Engelstad Arena • Grand Forks, North Dakota	T 5–5 ^{OT}	10–4–1 (10–4–1)
December 7	vs. Colorado College		Ralph Engelstad Arena • Grand Forks, North Dakota	W 7–3	11–4–1 (11–4–1)
December 27	vs. Boston University*		Ralph Engelstad Arena • Grand Forks, North Dakota	W 6–4	12–4–1 (10–4–1)
December 28	vs. Boston University*		Ralph Engelstad Arena • Grand Forks, North Dakota	T 2–2 ^{OT}	12–4–2 (11–4–1)
January 3	at Western Michigan*		Lawson Arena • Kalamazoo, Michigan	W 6–3	13–4–2 (11–4–1)
January 4	at Western Michigan*		Lawson Arena • Kalamazoo, Michigan	W 5–3	14–4–2 (11–4–1)
January 10	at St. Cloud State		National Hockey Center • St. Cloud, Minnesota	L 3–5	14–5–2 (11–5–1)
January 11	at St. Cloud State		National Hockey Center • St. Cloud, Minnesota	W 6–1	15–5–2 (12–5–1)
January 17	vs. Wisconsin		Ralph Engelstad Arena • Grand Forks, North Dakota	L 2–5	15–6–2 (12–6–1)
January 18	vs. Wisconsin		Ralph Engelstad Arena • Grand Forks, North Dakota	W 8–6	16–6–2 (13–6–1)
January 25	at Colorado College		Cadet Ice Arena • Colorado Springs, Colorado	W 3–0	17–6–2 (14–6–1)
January 26	at Colorado College		Cadet Ice Arena • Colorado Springs, Colorado	L 3–8	17–7–2 (14–7–1)
January 31	vs. Minnesota		Ralph Engelstad Arena • Grand Forks, North Dakota	W 6–4	18–7–2 (15–7–1)
February 1	vs. Minnesota		Ralph Engelstad Arena • Grand Forks, North Dakota	W 6–2	19–7–2 (16–7–1)
February 7	vs. Michigan Tech		Ralph Engelstad Arena • Grand Forks, North Dakota	W 4–2	20–7–2 (17–7–1)
February 8	vs. Michigan Tech		Ralph Engelstad Arena • Grand Forks, North Dakota	W 7–2	21–7–2 (18–7–1)
February 14	at Northern Michigan		Lakeview Arena • Marquette, Michigan	L 1–2	21–8–2 (18–8–1)
February 15	at Northern Michigan		Lakeview Arena • Marquette, Michigan	W 5–3	22–8–2 (19–8–1)
February 21	vs. Alaska–Anchorage		Ralph Engelstad Arena • Grand Forks, North Dakota	W 2–0	23–8–2 (20–8–1)
February 22	vs. Alaska–Anchorage		Ralph Engelstad Arena • Grand Forks, North Dakota	W 4–0	24–8–2 (21–8–1)
February 28	at Denver		DU Arena • Denver, Colorado	L 3–6	24–9–2 (21–9–1)
March 1	at Denver		DU Arena • Denver, Colorado	L 0–5	24–10–2 (21–10–1)
WCHA tournament
March 7	vs. Michigan Tech*		Ralph Engelstad Arena • Grand Forks, North Dakota (WCHA Quarterfinal Game 1)	W 4–1	25–10–2 (21–10–1)
March 8	vs. Michigan Tech*		Ralph Engelstad Arena • Grand Forks, North Dakota (WCHA Quarterfinal Game 2)	W 3–0	26–10–2 (21–10–1)
North Dakota Won Series 2-0
March 14	vs. Colorado College*		St. Paul Civic Center • Saint Paul, Minnesota (WCHA Semifinal)	W 5–1	27–10–2 (21–10–1)
March 15	vs. Minnesota*		St. Paul Civic Center • Saint Paul, Minnesota (WCHA championship)	W 4–3 ^{OT}	28–10–2 (21–10–1)
NCAA tournament
March 23	vs. Cornell*		Van Andel Arena • Grand Rapids, Michigan (Regional semifinal)	W 6–2	29–10–2 (21–10–1)
March 27	vs. Colorado College*		Bradley Center • Milwaukee, Wisconsin (National semifinal)	W 6–2	30–10–2 (21–10–1)
March 29	vs. Boston University*		Bradley Center • Milwaukee, Wisconsin (National championship)	W 6–4	31–10–2 (21–10–1)
*Non-conference game. ^{#}Rankings from USCHO.com Poll. Source:

== Roster ==
No.	Nat.	Player	Class	Pos	Height	Weight	DoB	Hometown	Previous team	NHL rights
1		Aaron Vickar	Sophomore	G	6' 1" (1.85 m)	190 lb (86 kg)	1976-01-01	St. Louis, Missouri	Omaha Lancers (USHL)	—
2		Curtis Murphy	Junior	D	5' 8" (1.73 m)	195 lb (88 kg)	1975-12-03	Kerrobert, Saskatchewan	Nipawin Hawks (SJHL)	—
3		Mark Pivetz (A)	Senior	D	6' 4" (1.93 m)	215 lb (98 kg)	1973-12-09	Edmonton, Alberta	Saskatoon Titans (SJHL)	QUE, 257 overall 1993
4		Dane Litke (C)	Senior	D	5' 10" (1.78 m)	180 lb (82 kg)	1972-08-11	Beausejour, Manitoba	Winkler Flyers (MJHL)	—
5		Jason Blake	Sophomore	C	5' 10" (1.78 m)	180 lb (82 kg)	1973-09-02	Moorhead, Minnesota	Ferris State Bulldogs (CCHA)	—
6		Tim O'Connell	Freshman	D	6' 4" (1.93 m)	210 lb (95 kg)	1977-10-26	Grand Forks, North Dakota	Fargo-Moorhead Bears (USHL)	—
7		Mitch Vig	Junior	D	6' 3" (1.91 m)	200 lb (91 kg)	1974-05-18	Bismarck, North Dakota	Dubuque Fighting Saints (USHL)	—
8		Kevin Hoogsteen (A)	Senior	RW	5' 11" (1.8 m)	175 lb (79 kg)	1972-12-17	Thunder Bay, Ontario	Thunder Bay Flyers (USHL)	—
9		Jason Ulmer	Freshman	C/LW	5' 10" (1.78 m)	185 lb (84 kg)	1978-12-20	Wilcox, Saskatchewan	Notre Dame Hounds (SJHL)	—
10		Ian Kallay	Sophomore	LW	5' 10" (1.78 m)	195 lb (88 kg)	1974-03-21	Calgary, Alberta	Langley Thunder (BCJHL)	—
11		Peter Armbrust	Freshman	RW	5' 11" (1.8 m)	195 lb (88 kg)	1977-12-03	Edina, Minnesota	Edina High School (USHS-MN)	—
15		Jesse Bull	Sophomore	F	5' 9" (1.75 m)	170 lb (77 kg)	1975-04-14	Faribault, Minnesota	St. Paul Vulcans (USHL)	—
16		Jay Panzer	Sophomore	F	5' 10" (1.78 m)	170 lb (77 kg)	1975-12-29	Grand Forks, North Dakota	Sioux City Musketeers (USHL)	—
18		David Hoogsteen	Sophomore	LW	5' 7" (1.7 m)	140 lb (64 kg)	1974-11-10	Thunder Bay, Ontario	Thunder Bay Flyers (USHL)	—
19		Jeff Ulmer	Sophomore	RW	5' 11" (1.8 m)	195 lb (88 kg)	1977-04-27	Regina, Saskatchewan	Notre Dame Hounds (SJHL)	—
20		Brad DeFauw	Freshman	LW	6' 2" (1.88 m)	225 lb (102 kg)	1977-11-10	Edina, Minnesota	Apple Valley High School (USHS-MN)	—
21		Brad Williamson	Sophomore	D	5' 10" (1.78 m)	185 lb (84 kg)	1977-03-09	Thunder Bay, Ontario	Thunder Bay Flyers (USHL)	—
22		Matt Henderson	Junior	LW	6' 1" (1.85 m)	210 lb (95 kg)	1974-03-01	White Bear Lake, Minnesota	St. Paul Vulcans (USHL)	—
25		Adam Calder	Sophomore	LW	5' 11" (1.8 m)	185 lb (84 kg)	1976-03-28	Portage La Prairie, Manitoba	Portage Terriers (MJHL)	—
26		Tom Philion	Sophomore	C	5' 6" (1.68 m)	160 lb (73 kg)	1974-12-11	Minot, North Dakota	Rochester Mustangs (USHL)	—
27		Tyler Rice	Junior	F	6' 1" (1.85 m)	210 lb (95 kg)	1973-06-04	Winnipeg, Manitoba	Notre Dame Hounds (SJHL)	—
28		Joe Blake	Freshman	D	6' 0" (1.83 m)	210 lb (95 kg)	1976-12-03	Champlin, Minnesota	Des Moines Buccaneers (USHL)	—
30		Aaron Schweitzer	Sophomore	G	5' 10" (1.78 m)	175 lb (79 kg)	1978-12-01	Regina, Saskatchewan		—
35		Toby Kvalevog	Senior	G	5' 11" (1.8 m)	170 lb (77 kg)	1974-12-22	Bemidji, Minnesota	Bemidji High School (USHS-MN)	OTT, 209 overall 1993
36		Erin McAleer	Freshman	F	6' 0" (1.83 m)	198 lb (90 kg)	1979-08-26	Republic, Washington	Surrey Eagles (BCJHL)	—

== Scoring statistics ==
Name	Position	Games	Goals	Assists	Points	PIM
David Hoogsteen	LW	43	27	27	54	16
Jason Blake	C	43	19	30	49	44
Curtis Murphy	D	43	12	30	42	36
Ian Kallay	LW	43	16	23	39	20
Jay Panzer	F	41	16	23	39	20
Kevin Hoogsteen	RW	39	18	20	38	54
Adam Calder	LW	42	10	22	32	48
Matt Henderson	LW	42	14	17	31	71
Dane Litke	D	39	3	27	30	14
Jesse Bull	F	37	15	7	22	20
Brad Williamson	D	43	4	15	19	38
Jeff Ulmer	F	36	6	11	17	16
Peter Armbrust	RW	40	10	6	16	26
Mark Pivetz	D	42	2	13	15	53
Brad DeFauw	LW	37	7	6	13	39
Tyler Rice	F	24	6	5	11	107
Mitch Vig	D	43	1	9	10	44
Jason Ulmer	C/LW	32	3	5	8	12
Tom Philion	C	17	1	3	4	14
Tim O'Connell	D	24	0	1	1	31
Aaron Vickar	G	7	0	0	0	0
Joe Blake	D	25	0	0	0	4
Aaron Schweitzer	G	24	0	0	0	0
Toby Kvalevog	G	22	0	0	0	2
Erin McAleer	F	31	0	0	0	14
Total						

== Goaltending statistics ==
Name	Games	Minutes	Wins	Losses	Ties	Goals against	Saves	Shut outs	SV %	GAA
Aaron Schweitzer	23	1170	17	3	0	45		4	.908	2.31
Toby Kvalevog	22	1132	12	5	2	61		1	.866	3.23
Aaron Vickar	7	287	2	2	0	19		0	.824	3.97
Total	43		31	10	2			5		

== 1997 national championship ==
=== (W2) North Dakota vs. (E2) Boston University ===
March 29	North Dakota	6 – 4	Boston University	Bradley Center

Scoring summary
Period	Team	Goal	Assist(s)	Time	Score
1st	BU	Peter Donatelli	Poti	8:44	1–0 BU
1st	BU	Chris Drury – PP	Poti and O'Connell	15:08	2–0 BU
2nd	UND	Curtis Murphy	Panzer and Henderson	27:06	2–1 BU
2nd	UND	David Hoogsteen	unassisted	28:38	2–2
2nd	UND	Matt Henderson – SH	unassisted	32:35	3–2 UND
2nd	BU	Chris Kelleher – PP	unassisted	33:56	3–3
2nd	UND	Matt Henderson – PP	Calder and Litke	35:49	4–3 UND
2nd	UND	David Hoogsteen – GW	Murphy	39:54	5–3 UND
3rd	BU	Jon Coleman	Kelleher and Sylvia	59:24	5–4 UND
3rd	UND	Adam Calder – EN	unassisted	59:41	6–4 UND

Shots by period
Team	1	2	3	T
Boston University	11	18	8	29
North Dakota	10	16	4	30

Goaltenders
Team	Name	Saves	Goals against	Time on ice
BU	Michel Larocque	24	5	58:28
UND	Aaron Schweitzer	25	4	60:00

== Players drafted into the NHL ==
=== 1997 NHL entry draft ===
= NHL All-Star team	= NHL All-Star	= NHL All-Star and NHL All-Star team	= Did not play in the NHL

Round	Pick	Player	NHL team
2	28	Brad DeFauw	Carolina Hurricanes
3	63	Lee Goren	Boston Bruins
