= 1997 NCAA Division I men's ice hockey tournament =

- Teams: 12
- Finals site: Bradley Center, Milwaukee
- Champions: North Dakota Fighting Sioux (6th title)
- Runner-up: Boston University Terriers (9th title game)
- Semifinalists: Colorado College Tigers (9th Frozen Four); Michigan Wolverines (18th Frozen Four)
- Winning coach: Dean Blais (1st title)
- MOP: Matt Henderson (North Dakota)
- Attendance: 84,728

The 1997 NCAA Division I men's ice hockey tournament involved 12 schools playing in single-elimination play to determine the national champion of men's NCAA Division I college ice hockey. It began on March 21, 1997, and ended with the championship game on March 29. A total of 11 games were played.

== Qualifying teams ==
The at-large bids and seedings for each team in the tournament were announced after the conference tournaments concluded. The Western Collegiate Hockey Association (WCHA) had four teams receive a berth in the tournament, the Central Collegiate Hockey Association (CCHA) and the ECAC each had three teams receive a berth in the tournament, and Hockey East had two berths.

East Regional – Worcester							West Regional – Grand Rapids						
Seed	School	Conference	Record	Berth type	Appearance	Last bid	Seed	School	Conference	Record	Berth type	Appearance	Last bid
1	Clarkson	ECAC	27–9–0	At-large bid	16th	1996	1	Michigan	CCHA	34–3–4	Tournament champion	20th	1996
2	Boston University	Hockey East	24–8–6	Tournament champion	23rd	1996	2	North Dakota	WCHA	28–10–2	Tournament champion	13th	1990
3	Vermont	ECAC	22–10–3	At-large bid	3rd	1996	3	Miami	CCHA	27–11–1	At-large bid	2nd	1993
4	New Hampshire	Hockey East	28–10–0	At-large bid	8th	1995	4	Minnesota	WCHA	27–12–1	At-large bid	24th	1996
5	Colorado College	WCHA	23–14–4	At-large bid	11th	1996	5	Michigan State	CCHA	23–12–4	At-large bid	17th	1996
6	Denver	WCHA	23–12–4	At-large bid	14th	1995	6	Cornell	ECAC	20–8–4	Tournament champion	12th	1996

== Game locations ==
- East Regional – Centrum Centre, Worcester, Massachusetts
- West Regional – Van Andel Arena, Grand Rapids, Michigan
- Frozen Four – Bradley Center, Milwaukee

== Bracket ==
First Round; March 21–22
E4	New Hampshire	2
E5	Colorado College	3
W3	Miami	2
W6	Cornell	4
E3	Vermont	3
E6	Denver	6
W4	Minnesota	6
W5	Michigan State	3

Quarterfinals; March 22–23
E1	Clarkson	4
E5	Colorado College	5
W2	North Dakota	6
W6	Cornell	2
E2	Boston University	4*
E6	Denver	3
W1	Michigan	7
W4	Minnesota	4

National Semifinals; March 27
E5	Colorado College	2
W2	North Dakota	6
E2	Boston University	3
W1	Michigan	2

National Championship; March 29
W2	North Dakota	6
E2	Boston University	4

Note: * denotes overtime period(s)

== Results ==
=== East Regional – Worcester, Massachusetts ===
==== First Round ====
March 21, 1997; 8:30 pm	(3) Vermont	3–6 (1–1, 1–2, 1–3)	(6) Denver	Centrum Centre; Attendance: 6,849

Game reference

Tim Thomas
Goalies
Jim Mullin
Referee:
Matt Shegos
Linesmen:
Jon LaDuke
John Dobrzelewski

	0 – 1	09:35 – Erik Andersson (Laaksonen)
(Kloboucek) Eric Perrin – 15:45	1 – 1
(Reid) Stéphane Piché – 26:44	2 – 1
	2 – 2	28:08 – Anders Björk (Gunther)
	2 – 3	32:47 – Antti Laaksonen (Gunther)
(Ruid, Navrat) Eric Hollman – 42:01	3 – 3
	3 – 4	48:02 – GW – Anders Björk (Comrie, Veres)
	3 – 5	49:22 – Antti Laaksonen (unassisted)
	3 – 6	53:56 – James Patterson (T. Smith, Morgan)

16 min
Penalties
16 min
34
Shots
27

March 21, 1997; 5:00 pm	(4) New Hampshire	2–3 (0–1, 1–1, 1–1)	(5) Colorado College	Centrum Centre

Game reference

Sean Matile
Goalies
Judd Lambert
Referee:
Mike Noeth
Linesmen:
Mike St. Louis
Jack Dunn

	0 – 1	16:16 – Toby Petersen (S. Swanson)
	0 – 2	29:03 – Brian Swanson (Clark)
(Murray, Nolan) Jason Krog – 34:09	1 – 2
(Boguniecki, O'Brien) Eric Nickulas – 44:04	2 – 2
	2 – 3	55:00 – GW – Cam Kryway (B. Swanson, Rud)

33
Shots
23

==== Quarterfinals ====
March 22, 1997; 5:00 pm	(1) Clarkson	4–5 (0–4, 1–0, 3–1)	(5) Colorado College	Centrum Centre

Game reference

Dan Murphy
Goalies
Judd Lambert

	0 – 1	07:47 – T.J. Tanberg (Gudmundson, Karpan)
	0 – 2	08:23 – Brian Swanson (Needham, S. Swanson)
	0 – 3	10:47 – Calvin Elfring (Clark)
	0 – 4	18:33 – Stewart Bodtker (Petersen, Austin)
(Clark, Pagnutti) Jean-François Houle – PP – 32:08	1 – 4
	1 – 5	43:54 – GW – Darren Clark (Kryway, Peters)
(Mulvihill, Maidment) Jordan Grant – PP – 46:47	2 – 5
(Houle) Todd White – 47:19	3 – 5
(Pagnutti) Jean-François Houle – EA – 58:21	4 – 5

16 min
Penalties
8 min
25
Shots
23

March 22, 1997; 8:30 pm	(2) Boston University	4–3 (OT) (1–1, 0–0, 2–2, 1–0)	(6) Denver	Centrum Centre; Attendance: 9,105

Game reference

Michel Larocque
Goalies
Jim Mullin

	0 – 1	02:07 – Garrett Buzan (Hacker)
(Bates, LaCouture) Albie O'Connell – PP – 06:21	1 – 1
	1 – 2	46:17 – Paul Veres (Björk, Comrie)
(Bates, Poti) Albie O'Connell – 49:13	2 – 2
(unassisted) Shawn Bates – SH – 56:41	3 – 2
	3 – 3	59:08 – EA – Erik Andersson (Comrie, Murphy)
(Kelleher) Chris Drury – GW – 72:20	4 – 3

32
Shots
24

=== West Regional – Grand Rapids, Michigan ===
==== First Round ====
March 22, 1997; 3:00 pm	(3) Miami	2–4 (1–1, 1–1, 0–2)	(6) Cornell	Van Andel Arena

Game reference

Trevor Prior
Goalies
Jason Elliott
Referee:
Mike Schmitt
Linesmen:
Jon Campion
Derek Shepherd

(Robitaille) Adam Copeland – 07:06	1 – 0
	1 – 1	14:04 – Ryan Smart (Papp, Tymchyshyn)
	1 – 2	35:27 – Jeff Oates (Stienstra, Adler)
(Bautch, Shalawylo) Josh Harrold – 36:51	2 – 2
	2 – 3	48:00 – GW – Ryan Moynihan (Rutter, Burgoyne)
	2 – 4	59:20 – EN – Matt Cooney (Tymchyshyn, S. Wilson)

0 min
Penalties
4 min
25
Shots
26

March 22, 1997; 6:30 pm	(4) Minnesota	6–3 (3–1, 2–1, 1–1)	(5) Michigan State	Van Andel Arena; Attendance: 8,276

Game reference

Steve DeBus
Goalies
Chad Alban
Referee:
Frank Cole
Linesmen:
Bill Jones
Bill Doiron

(Anderson, Godbout) Dan Woog – 03:01	1 – 0
	1 – 1	09:05 – Mike York (Tuzzolino)
(Miller, Checco) Dan Hendrickson – 10:33	2 – 1
(LaFleur, Crowley) Casey Hankinson – PP – 18:46	3 – 1
(Berg, Clymer) Casey Hankinson – GW – 24:37	4 – 1
(Hankinson, Berg) Dave Spehar – PP – 27:19	5 – 1
	5 – 2	34:31 – Steve Ferranti (Horcoff, Loeding)
(Hankinson) Mike Crowley – PP – 47:44	6 – 2
	6 – 3	57:19 – SH – Shawn Horcoff (Harlton)

26 min
Penalties
28 min
40
Shots
33

==== Quarterfinals ====
March 23, 1997; 5:30 pm	(1) Michigan	7–4 (3–0, 4–3, 0–1)	(4) Minnesota	Van Andel Arena; Attendance: 8,926

Game reference

Marty Turco
Goalies
Steve DeBus
Referee:
Tim Benedetto
Linesmen:
Brian Sullivan
John Jones

(Botterill) Brendan Morrison – 00:33	1 – 0
(Botterill) Bob Muckalt – 18:41	2 – 0
(Luhning, Morrison) Jason Botterill – PP – 19:42	3 – 0
(Muckalt, Frescoln) Jason Botterill – 20:23	4 – 0
(Luhning, Turco) Matt Herr – GW – 20:57	5 – 0
	5 – 1	25:31 – Erik Rasmussen (unassisted)
(Peach, Fox) Greg Crozier – 29:07	6 – 1
	6 – 2	30:58 – PP – Erik Rasmussen (unassisted)
	6 – 3	34:10 – PP – Casey Hankinson (Berg, Crowley)
(Sloan) Brendan Morrison – 37:35	7 – 3
	7 – 4	40:54 – Dave Spehar (Hankinson, Abrahamson)

28 min
Penalties
18 min
38
Shots
25

March 23, 1997; 2:00 pm	(2) North Dakota	6–2 (2–1, 1–1, 3–0)	(6) Cornell	Van Andel Arena

Game reference

Aaron Schweitzer
Goalies
Jason Elliott
Referee:
Frank Cole
Linesmen:
Bill Jones
Bill Doiron

(unassisted) Jay Panzer – 01:39	1 – 0
(DeFauw) Kevin Hoogsteen – PP – 07:15	2 – 0
	2 – 1	19:41 – PP – Tony Gergin (Burgoyne, Rutter)
(D. Hoogsteen) Curtis Murphy – GW – 21:11	3 – 1
	3 – 2	23:53 – PP – Matt Cooney (Knopp, Dailey)
(Pivetz) Jesse Bull – 49:21	4 – 2
(Litke, Ulmer) Brad DeFauw – 53:49	5 – 2
(unassisted) Matt Henderson – EN – 59:09	6 – 2

16 min
Penalties
16 min
38
Shots
22

=== Frozen Four – Milwaukee, Wisconsin ===
==== National Semifinals ====
March 27, 1997; 12:00 pm	(W2) North Dakota	6–2 (3–1, 3–1, 0–0)	(E5) Colorado College	Bradley Center; Attendance: 17,212

Game reference

Aaron Schweitzer
Goalies
Judd Lambert (out 57:41)
Todd Gustin (in 57:41)
Referee:
Don Adam
Linesmen:
Randy Schmidt
Tim Swiader

(Henderson, Pivetz) Adam Calder – 04:55	1 – 0
(Panzer) Kevin Hoogsteen – 07:14	2 – 0
(unassisted) Jason Blake – GW – 07:47	3 – 0
	3 – 1	12:06 – Eric Rud (unassisted)
	3 – 2	22:04 – Toby Petersen (unassisted)
(Litke) Matt Henderson – 23:58	4 – 2
(Blake, Kallay) David Hoogsteen – 24:41	5 – 2
(unassisted) Jesse Bull – 32:32	6 – 2

6 min
Penalties
8 min
41
Shots
25

March 27, 1997; 6:30 pm	(W1) Michigan	2–3 (1–0, 0–3, 1–0)	(E2) Boston University	Bradley Center; Attendance: 17,375

Game reference

Marty Turco
Goalies
Michel Larocque
Referee:
Mike Schmitt
Linesmen:
Jon Campion
Derek Shepherd

(Legg, Madden) Warren Luhning – 14:00	1 – 0
	1 – 1	27:53 – Greg Quebec (LaCouture)
	1 – 2	33:30 – Chris Heron (Bates, Poti)
	1 – 3	36:29 – GW PP – Tommi Degerman (Drury, Poti)
(Madden, Luhning) Brendan Morrison – 59:04	2 – 3

4 min
Penalties
23 min
20
Shots
21

==== National Championship ====
March 29, 1997; 12:00 pm	(W2) North Dakota	6–4 (0–2, 5–1, 1–1)	(E2) Boston University	Bradley Center; Attendance: 17,537

Game reference
Referee: Matt Shegos; Linesmen: John Dobrzelewski; John LaDuke

Scoring summary
Period	Team	Goal	Assist(s)	Time	Score
1st	BU	Peter Donatelli	Poti	8:44	1–0 BU
1st	BU	Chris Drury – PP	Poti and O'Connell	15:08	2–0 BU
2nd	UND	Curtis Murphy	Panzer and Henderson	27:06	2–1 BU
2nd	UND	David Hoogsteen	unassisted	28:38	2–2
2nd	UND	Matt Henderson – SH	unassisted	32:35	3–2 UND
2nd	BU	Chris Kelleher – PP	unassisted	33:56	3–3
2nd	UND	Matt Henderson – PP	Calder and Litke	35:49	4–3 UND
2nd	UND	David Hoogsteen – GW	Murphy	39:54	5–3 UND
3rd	BU	Jon Coleman	Kelleher and Sylvia	59:24	5–4 UND
3rd	UND	Adam Calder – EN	unassisted	59:41	6–4 UND
Penalty summary
Period	Team	Player	Penalty	Time	PIM
1st	UND	Jesse Bull	Hooking	2:12	2:00
1st	BU	Billy Pierce	Interference	4:47	2:00
1st	BU	Chris Kelleher	Interference	9:40	2:00
1st	UND	Matt Henderson	Elbowing	13:34	2:00
2nd	BU	Greg Quebec	Interference	23:01	2:00
2nd	UND	Curtis Murphy	Tripping	31:44	2:00
2nd	UND	Mark Pivetz	Interference	33:12	2:00
2nd	BU	Matt Wright	Interference	35:02	2:00
3rd	BU	Mike Sylvia	Cross-checking	48:02	2:00
3rd	UND	Mitch Vig	Holding	51:44	2:00
3rd	UND	Matt Henderson	Interference	57:09	2:00

Shots by period
Team	1	2	3	T
Boston University	11	10	8	29
North Dakota	10	16	4	30

Goaltenders
Team	Name	Saves	Goals against	Time on ice
BU	Michel Larocque	24	5	58:28
UND	Aaron Schweitzer	25	4	60:00

== All-Tournament team ==
- G: Aaron Schweitzer (North Dakota)
- D: Curtis Murphy (North Dakota)
- D: Tom Poti (Boston University)
- F: Chris Drury (Boston University)
- F: Matt Henderson* (North Dakota)
- F: David Hoogsteen (North Dakota)

* Most Outstanding Player(s)

== Record by conference ==
Conference	# of Bids	Record	Win %	Regional semifinals	Frozen Four	Championship Game	Champions
WCHA	4	7-3	.700	4	2	1	1
CCHA	3	1-3	.250	1	1	–	–
ECAC	3	1-3	.250	2	-	-	-
Hockey East	2	2-2	.500	1	1	1	-
