= Jayme Filipowicz =

American ice hockey player

- Born: June 15, 1976 (age 50) Arlington Heights, Illinois, USA
- Height: 6 ft 3 in (191 cm)
- Weight: 212 lb (96 kg; 15 st 2 lb)
- Position: Defenseman
- Shot: Left
- Played for: New Hampshire; Milwaukee Admirals; Quebec Citadelles; Saint John Flames; Richmond Renegades; Hartford Wolf Pack; Providence Bruins; Augsburger Panther
- Playing career: 1996–2006

Jayme M. Filipowicz is an American certified anesthesiologist assistant and former ice hockey defenseman who was an All-American for New Hampshire.

== Career ==
Filipowicz' college career began in 1996 at the University of New Hampshire. His arrival in Durham coincided with the ice hockey team seeing a huge improvement in their performance. In his freshman season, the Wildcats posted a program-record 28 wins, a stark turnaround after finishing with a losing record the year before. It was also the first regular season conference title for UNH in 23 years. Despite the team reaching the Hockey East championship game, Filipowicz' team could only secure a 4-seed in the NCAA Tournament and fell in their first match to defending finalist Colorado College. While the team held serve the following year, Filipowicz say his production increase significantly and he helped the Wildcats reach their first Frozen Four in 16 years. As a junior, Filipowicz nearly tripled his goal output and helped push UNH to heights that the program had never seen before. He led the team's defensive corps in scoring and lifted the team to its first 30-win season. While New Hampshire ultimately fell in the conference title game, they marched through the NCAA Tournament after receiving the 2nd-overall seed and reached the first NCAA championship game in program history. UNH battled conference rival Maine to a draw in regulation and pushed the match into overtime. Unfortunately, the Black Bears were able to secure the winning goal on a broken play and ended the Wildcats' title hopes.

Despite having a year of eligibility left, Filipowicz left UNH in 1999 to sign a professional contract with the Nashville Predators. He was assigned to the Milwaukee Admirals the following year and performed well, leading the team's defense in scoring. After that initial season, however, Filipowicz lost his offensive touch. He remained a highly regarded defender, however, and spent most of the next five seasons playing AAA-hockey. After helping the Providence Bruins reached the Calder Cup semifinals, Filipowicz headed to Europe for one season before retiring as a player.

With his playing days behind him, Filipowicz returned to college and eventually enrolled at Nova Southeastern University. He graduated with honors in 2013 and became a certified anesthesiologist assistant. He has been working in that field since and, as of 2021, resided in Greenwood Village, Colorado.

== Statistics ==
=== Regular season and playoffs ===
			Regular Season					Playoffs
Season	Team	League	GP	G	A	Pts	PIM	GP	G	A	Pts	PIM
1993–94	Rochester Mustangs	USHL	47	7	16	23	52	—	—	—	—	—
1994–95	Dubuque Fighting Saints	USHL	32	0	12	12	51	—	—	—	—	—
1995–96	Dubuque Fighting Saints	USHL	45	7	29	36	106	—	—	—	—	—
1996–97	New Hampshire	Hockey East	35	3	16	19	43	—	—	—	—	—
1997–98	New Hampshire	Hockey East	38	3	28	31	47	—	—	—	—	—
1998–99	New Hampshire	Hockey East	41	8	30	38	56	—	—	—	—	—
1999–00	Milwaukee Admirals	IHL	76	9	23	32	120	3	0	1	1	0
2000–01	Milwaukee Admirals	IHL	68	0	13	13	101	2	0	0	0	2
2001–02	Quebec Citadelles	AHL	63	0	7	7	107	1	0	0	0	2
2002–03	Richmond Renegades	ECHL	20	1	8	9	36	—	—	—	—	—
2002–03	Saint John Flames	AHL	63	2	13	15	106	—	—	—	—	—
2003–04	Hartford Wolf Pack	AHL	63	2	6	8	116	7	0	1	1	2
2004–05	Providence Bruins	AHL	78	2	7	9	124	16	2	1	3	20
2005–06	Augsburger Panther	DEL	39	0	3	3	40	—	—	—	—	—
USHL totals			124	14	57	71	209	—	—	—	—	—
NCAA totals			114	14	74	88	146	—	—	—	—	—
IHL totals			144	9	36	45	221	5	0	1	1	2
AHL totals			267	6	33	39	453	24	2	2	4	24

== Awards and honors ==
Award	Year
All-Hockey East First Team	1998–99
AHCA East Second-Team All-American	1998–99
Hockey East All-Tournament Team	1999
All-NCAA All-Tournament Team	1999
