= David Hoogsteen =

Canadian ice hockey player

- Born: November 10, 1974 (age 51) Thunder Bay, Ontario, Canada
- Height: 5 ft 9 in (175 cm)
- Weight: 174 lb (79 kg; 12 st 6 lb)
- Position: Left wing
- Shot: Left
- Played for: Straubing Tigers; Richmond Renegades; Trenton Titans; Fayetteville Force; Rockford IceHogs; Amsterdam Tigers
- Playing career: 1995–2004

David Hoogsteen (born November 10, 1974) is a Canadian retired ice hockey coach and center who was an All-American for North Dakota.

== Career ==
Hoogsteen played junior hockey for his hometown Thunder Bay Flyers. Over three seasons he increased his point total, finishing as the team's leading scorer in 1995 and helping them win the Dudley Hewitt Cup. The following year he began attending the University of North Dakota, joining his brother Kevin on the ice hockey team. In his first season with the Fighting Sioux, Hoogsteen provided depth scoring but came into his own during his sophomore year. UND shot up the standings, finishing atop the WCHA standings for the first time in a decade and went on to win the conference championship. Hoogsteen was named tournament MVP and led the team to their first NCAA Tournament appearance since 1990 and the Fighting Sioux went on a roll. The team scored six goals in each of their three games, winning the national championship. Hoogsteen scored twice in the final game, including the game-winning goal and was named an All-American for the year. Over his final two years with North Dakota, Hoogsteen remained a key contributor. He helped the club post three consecutive 30-win seasons, winning the regular season championship each time. Unfortunately, in '98 and '99 UND lost in conference championship game as well as their first NCAA tournament match.

After graduating, Hoogsteen's professional career began with a shirt stint in Germany but he ended up finishing the year in the ECHL. After two more seasons playing in the lower minor leagues, he returned to Europe and played a couple of years with the Amsterdam Tigers. He retired as a player in 2004 after helping the club win back-to-back Eredivisie championships.

== Statistics ==
=== Regular season and playoffs ===
			Regular Season					Playoffs
Season	Team	League	GP	G	A	Pts	PIM	GP	G	A	Pts	PIM
1992–93	Thunder Bay Flyers	USHL	34	13	11	24	23	—	—	—	—	—
1993–94	Thunder Bay Flyers	USHL	48	29	34	63	64	—	—	—	—	—
1994–95	Thunder Bay Flyers	USHL	48	40	56	96	34	—	—	—	—	—
1995–96	North Dakota	WCHA	31	10	10	20	20	—	—	—	—	—
1996–97	North Dakota	WCHA	43	27	27	54	16	—	—	—	—	—
1997–98	North Dakota	WCHA	35	20	23	43	16	—	—	—	—	—
1998–99	North Dakota	WCHA	31	11	29	40	6	—	—	—	—	—
1999–00	Straubing Tigers	Oberliga	8	4	3	7	0	—	—	—	—	—
1999–00	Richmond Renegades	ECHL	14	5	2	7	0	—	—	—	—	—
1999–00	Trenton Titans	ECHL	15	9	12	21	0	12	0	5	5	0
2000–01	Fayetteville Force	CHL	70	23	43	66	46	5	2	2	4	2
2001–02	Rockford IceHogs	UHL	73	33	36	69	63	—	—	—	—	—
2002–03	Amsterdam Tigers	Eredivisie	40	34	45	79	16	9	3	6	9	6
2003–04	Amsterdam Tigers	Eredivisie	36	54	52	106	36	9	7	9	16	4
USHL totals			130	82	101	183	121	—	—	—	—	—
NCAA totals			140	68	89	157	58	—	—	—	—	—
ECHL totals			29	14	14	28	0	12	0	5	5	0
Eredivisie totals			76	88	97	185	52	18	10	15	25	10

== Awards and honors ==
Award	Year
All-WCHA First Team	1996–97
AHCA West Second-Team All-American	1996–97
WCHA All-Tournament Team	1997
All-NCAA All-Tournament Team	1997
All-WCHA Second team	1997–98

Awards and achievements
Preceded by Brian Bonin	WCHA Most Valuable Player in Tournament; 1997	Succeeded by Joe Bianchi
