= 1999 Hockey East men's ice hockey tournament =

1999 Hockey East Men's ice hockey tournament
- Dates: March 11–20, 1999
- Teams: 8
- Finals site: Fleet Center; Boston, Massachusetts
- Champions: Boston College (4th title)
- Winning coach: Jerry York (2nd title)
- MVP: Blake Bellefeuille (Boston College)
- Hockey East Men's Ice Hockey Tournaments

The 1999 Hockey East Men's Ice Hockey Tournament was the 15th tournament in the history of the conference. It was played between March 11 and March 20, 1999. Quarterfinal games were played at home team campus sites, while the final four games were played at the Fleet Center in Boston, Massachusetts, the home venue of the NHL's Boston Bruins. By winning the tournament, Boston College received the Hockey East's automatic bid to the 1999 NCAA Division I Men's Ice Hockey Tournament.

== Format ==
The tournament featured three rounds of play. The team that finishes ninth in the conference is not eligible for tournament play. In the first round, the first and eighth seeds, the second and seventh seeds, the third seed and sixth seeds, and the fourth seed and fifth seeds played a best-of-three with the winner advancing to the semifinals. In the semifinals, the highest and lowest seeds and second highest and second lowest seeds play a single-elimination game, with the winner advancing to the championship game. The tournament champion receives an automatic bid to the 1999 NCAA Division I Men's Ice Hockey Tournament.

== Conference standings ==
Note: GP = Games played; W = Wins; L = Losses; T = Ties; PTS = Points; GF = Goals For; GA = Goals Against

1998–99 Hockey East standings
	Conference							Overall					
	GP	W	L	T	PTS	GF	GA	GP	W	L	T	GF	GA
#2 New Hampshire†	24	18	3	3	39	100	49	41	31	7	3	171	91
#1 Maine	24	17	5	2	36	96	64	41	31	6	4	167	94
#4 Boston College*	24	15	7	2	32	99	73	43	27	12	4	170	125
Providence	24	12	11	1	25	90	81	38	20	17	1	159	134
Boston University	24	8	13	3	19	72	86	37	14	20	3	117	132
Massachusetts–Lowell	24	9	15	0	18	65	85	36	17	19	0	112	117
Massachusetts	24	8	14	2	18	56	86	35	12	21	2	80	114
Merrimack	24	7	16	1	15	67	94	36	11	24	1	107	136
Northeastern	24	6	16	2	14	74	101	34	11	20	3	108	132
Championship: Boston College † indicates conference regular season champion * indicates conference tournament champion Final rankings: USA Today/American Hockey Magazine Coaches Poll Top 10 Poll

== Bracket ==
Quarterfinals; March 11–14
1	New Hampshire	3	5	—
8	Merrimack	2	4	—
2	Maine	3	5	—
7	Massachusetts	1	2	—
(Pairings are reseeded after the first round)
3	Boston College	5	5	—
6	Massachusetts-Lowell	0	4	—
4	Providence	8	2	5
5	Boston University	2	8	1

Semifinals; March 19
1	New Hampshire	6
4	Providence	2
2	Maine	2
3	Boston College	3

Championship; March 20
1	New Hampshire	4
3	Boston College	5*

Note: * denotes overtime period(s)

=== Quarterfinals ===
==== (1) New Hampshire vs. (8) Merrimack ====
March 12	New Hampshire	3 – 2	Merrimack	Whittemore Center
No Scoring		First period	No scoring
Dan Enders - 06:42; Jayme Filipowicz - 15:39		Second period	No scoring
Corey-Joe Ficek - GW - 14:39		Third period	16:33 - PP - Rejean Stringer; 19:12 - EN - Greg Classen
Ty Conklin ( 34 saves / 37 shots )		Goalie stats	Tom Welby ( 28 saves / 30 shots )

March 13	New Hampshire	5 – 4	Merrimack	Whittemore Center
Darren Haydar - 05:20; Jason Krog - 15:10; Jason Krog - PP - 18:12		First period	No scoring
No Scoring		Second period	00:38 - PP - Kris Porter; 00:54 - Chris Halecki; 05:44 - Ryan Kiley
Jason Krog - PP - 02:49; Jason Krog - GW - 11:19		Third period	19:45 - EA - Kris Porter
Sean Matile ( 20 saves / 24 shots )		Goalie stats	Tom Welby ( 40 saves / 45 shots )

New Hampshire won series 2–0

==== (2) Maine vs. (7) Massachusetts ====
March 11	Maine	3 – 1	Massachusetts	Alfond Arena
Dan Kerluke - 05:23		First period	No scoring
Bobby Stewart - GW SH - 00:37		Second period	01:36 - Jeff Blanchard
Cory Larose - 03:32		Third period	No scoring
Alfie Michaud ( 20 saves / 21 shots )		Goalie stats	Markus Helanen ( 40 saves / 43 shots )

March 12	Maine	5 – 2	Massachusetts	Alfond Arena
Steve Kariya - 06:13; Bobby Stewart - 19:24		First period	16:32 - Ray Geever; 17:11 - Jeff Blanchard
Cory Larose - GW PP - 19:16; Dan Kerluke - 19:50		Second period	No scoring
Steve Kariya - 16:03		Third period	No scoring
Alfie Michaud ( 43 saves / 48 shots )		Goalie stats	Markus Helanen ( 22 saves / 24 shots )

Maine won series 2–0

==== (3) Boston College vs. (6) Massachusetts-Lowell ====
March 11	Boston College	5 – 0	Massachusetts-Lowell	Conte Forum
Jeff Farkas - GW - 09:44; Brian Gionta - PP - 15:44		First period	No scoring
Brian Gionta - SH - 11:48; Blake Bellefeuille - PP - 17:39		Second period	No scoring
Jeff Giuliano - 11:41		Third period	No scoring
Scott Clemmensen ( 26 saves / 26 shots )		Goalie stats	Scott Fankhouser ( 10 saves / 13 shots ) / Jimi St. john ( 12 saves / 14 shots )

March 12	Boston College	5 – 4	Massachusetts-Lowell	Conte Forum
Andy Powers - 07:48		First period	01:07 - Brad Rooney; 10:53 - Kevin Bertram
Blake Bellefeuille - 05:44; Brian Gionta - PP - 19:28		Second period	No scoring
Bobby Allen - 06:00; Jeff Farkas - GW - 06:34		Third period	07:27 - PP - Kevin Bertram; 13:11 - PP - Doug Nolan
Scott Clemmensen ( 14 saves / 18 shots )		Goalie stats	Jimi St. john ( 20 saves / 25 shots ) / Scott Fankhouser ( 3 saves / 3 shots )

Boston College won series 2–0

==== (4) Providence vs. (5) Boston University ====
March 12	Providence	8 – 2	Boston University	Schneider Arena
No Scoring		First period	16:20 - Carl Corazzini
Drew Omicioli - 03:02		Second period	07:35 - Carl Corazzini
Troy Lake - 01:23; Matt Libby - GW - 01:57; Mike Omicioli - 03:13; Fernando Pisani - 04:29; Jon Coe - PP - 01:57; Doug Sheppard - PP - 12:49; Doug Sheppard - SH - 18:01		Third period	No scoring
Boyd Ballard ( 29 saves / 31 shots )		Goalie stats	Michael Larocque ( 16 saves / 22 shots ) / Jason Tapp ( 1 saves / 3 shots )

March 13	Providence	2 – 8	Boston University	Schneider Arena
Nick Lent - 14:49		First period	03:41 - Tommi Degerman
No Scoring		Second period	01:58 - Chris Heron; 02:32 - GW - Mike Pandolfo; 03:48 - Greg Quebec; 14:23 - Mike Pandolfo; 19:45 - Bobby Hanson
Jerry Keefe - PP - 00:28		Third period	03:55 - Joe DiPenta; 10:28 - Tommi Degerman
Boyd Ballard ( 13 saves / 18 shots ) / Mark Kane ( 8 saves / 11 shots )		Goalie stats	Michael Larocque ( 24 saves / 26 shots )

March 14	Providence	5 – 1	Boston University	Schneider Arena
Doug Sheppard - PP - 15:48; Jon Cameron - GW PP - 17:22		First period	No scoring
Josh MacNevin - 14:42		Second period	No scoring
Nick Lent - SH - 11:30; Troy Lake - PP - 12:12		Third period	16:34 - Pat Aufiero
Boyd Ballard ( 14 saves / 15 shots )		Goalie stats	Michael Larocque ( 27 saves / 32 shots )

Providence won series 2–1

=== Semifinals ===
==== (1) New Hampshire vs. (4) Providence ====
March 19	New Hampshire	6 – 2	Providence	Fleet Center
No Scoring		First period	No scoring
Steve O'Brien - 04:08; Christian Bragnalo - PP - 6:20; Chad Onufrechuk - GW SH - 19:06		Second period	09:03 - SH - Mike Omicioli
John Sadowski - PP - 10:43; Jason Krog - 11:41; Darren Haydar - PP - 15:46		Third period	01:31 - PP - Doug Sheppard
Ty Conklin ( 26 saves / 28 shots )		Goalie stats	Boyd Ballard ( 20 saves / 26 shots ) / Mark Kane ( 2 saves / 2 shots )

==== (2) Maine vs. (3) Boston College ====
March 19	Maine	2 – 3	Boston College	Fleet Center
Barrett Heisten - 02:48		First period	10:49 - PP - Blake Bellefeuille; 15:37 - Andy Powers
No scoring		Second period	16:09 - GW PP - Blake Bellefeuille
Steve Kariya - PP - 17:08		Third period	No scoring
Alfie Michaud ( 21 saves / 24 shots )		Goalie stats	Scott Clemmensen ( 33 saves / 35 shots )

=== Championship ===
==== (1) New Hampshire vs. (3) Boston College ====
March 20	New Hampshire	4 – 5	OT	Boston College	Fleet Center
Jason Krog - 15:46		First period		02:22 - Jeff Farkas; 08:23 - PP - Jeff Farkas; 02:22 - Blake Bellefeuille; 14:25 - Kevin Caulfield
David Busch - 03:53; Jason Shipulski - 04:03		Second period		No scoring
Johnny Rogers - 15:18		Third period		No scoring
No scoring		First overtime period		06:58 - Blake Bellefeuille
Ty Conklin ( 33 saves / 38 shots )		Goalie stats		Scott Clemmensen ( 20 saves / 24 shots )

== Tournament awards ==
=== All-Tournament Team ===
- F Blake Bellefeuille* (Boston College)
- F Jeff Farkas (Boston College)
- F Jason Krog (New Hampshire)
- D Bobby Allen (Boston College)
- D Jayme Filipowicz (New Hampshire)
- G Scott Clemmensen (Boston College)

* Tournament MVP(s)
