= Matt Henderson (ice hockey) =

American ice hockey player (born 1974)

- Born: June 22, 1974 (age 52) White Bear Lake, Minnesota, U.S.
- Height: 6 ft 1 in (185 cm)
- Weight: 210 lb (95 kg; 15 st 0 lb)
- Position: Left wing
- Shot: Left
- Played for: Nashville Predators; Chicago Blackhawks; Iserlohn Roosters
- NHL draft: Undrafted
- Playing career: 1998–2004

Matt Henderson (born June 22, 1974) is an American retired ice hockey winger. He played in six National Hockey League games with the Nashville Predators and Chicago Blackhawks between 1999 and 2002. The rest of his career, which lasted from 1998 to 2004, was mainly spent in the minor leagues.

== Career statistics ==
=== Regular season and playoffs ===
			Regular season					Playoffs
Season	Team	League	GP	G	A	Pts	PIM	GP	G	A	Pts	PIM
1991–92	White Bear Lake Area High School	HS-MN	—	—	—	—	—	—	—	—	—	—
1992–93	St. Paul Vulcans	USHL	45	14	19	33	83	—	—	—	—	—
1993–94	St. Paul Vulcans	USHL	48	27	24	51	—	—	—	—	—	—
1994–95	University of North Dakota	WCHA	19	1	3	4	16	—	—	—	—	—
1995–96	University of North Dakota	WCHA	36	9	10	19	34	—	—	—	—	—
1996–97	University of North Dakota	WCHA	42	14	17	31	71	—	—	—	—	—
1997–98	University of North Dakota	WCHA	38	24	14	38	74	—	—	—	—	—
1998–99	Nashville Predators	NHL	2	0	0	0	2	—	—	—	—	—
1998–99	Milwaukee Admirals	IHL	77	19	19	38	117	2	0	0	0	0
1999–00	Philadelphia Phantoms	AHL	51	4	8	12	37	5	0	0	0	4
1999–00	Trenton Titans	ECHL	16	2	4	6	47	—	—	—	—	—
2000–01	Norfolk Admirals	AHL	78	14	24	38	80	9	1	1	2	16
2001–02	Chicago Blackhawks	NHL	4	0	1	1	0	—	—	—	—	—
2001–02	Norfolk Admirals	AHL	74	21	28	49	90	4	0	0	0	6
2002–03	Norfolk Admirals	AHL	77	18	29	47	95	1	0	0	0	0
2003–04	Iserlohn Roosters	DEL	51	11	12	23	105	—	—	—	—	—
AHL totals			280	57	89	146	302	19	1	1	2	26
NHL totals			6	0	1	1	2	—	—	—	—	—

== Awards and honors ==
Award	Year
All-NCAA All-Tournament Team	1997

Awards and achievements
Preceded by Brendan Morrison	NCAA Tournament Most Outstanding Player; 1997	Succeeded by Marty Turco
Preceded by Eric Rud	WCHA Defensive Player of the Year; 1997–98; With: Andy Sutton	Succeeded by Brad Williamson
