= Jay Panzer =

American ice hockey player

- Born: February 2, 1975 (age 51) Grand Forks, North Dakota, USA
- Height: 5 ft 10 in (178 cm)
- Weight: 170 lb (77 kg; 12 st 2 lb)
- Position: Forward
- Shot: Left
- Played for: Greenville Grrrowl
- Playing career: 1995–2000

Jay Panzer is an American former ice hockey defenseman who was an All-American for North Dakota.

== Career ==
A native of Grand Forks, Panzer returned home after finishing his junior career and began attending the University of North Dakota in 1995. He saw limited time as a freshman, but rounded into a full-time player as a sophomore. That season, North Dakota saw a tremendous improvement for the entire team and the Fighting Sioux returned to the NCAA Tournament for the first time in seven years. As the WCHA Champion, UND received the 2nd western seed and began its postseason run in the quarterfinals. The Sioux didn't have any of the top scorers in the nation but they were able to utilize all of their forward lines in combination to produce one of the top scoring teams in the country. That firepower was on full display during their tournament run as North Dakota scored 6 times in each of its three games. In the 1997 championship game, after Boston University had built a 2–0 lead, UND rolled through the Terriers in the second period, scoring 5 goals. Panzer assisted on UND's first marker and then helped the team hold the fort in the third to win the National Championship.

Over his final two seasons, Panzer increased his scoring each year and was named an All-American as a senior. In both years, UND won the WCHA regular season title but lost in the conference championship game and dropped their opening game of the NCAA Tournament. After graduating with a B.S. in Marketing, Panzer played one year of professional hockey before retiring from the game. Afterwards, he returned home to Grand Forks and began working as financial advisor with Investment Centers of America. He remains with the company as of 2021.

Panzer was inducted into the Grand Forks Central High School Hall of Fame in 2007.

== Personal life ==
Jay played with his younger brother Jeff in his final two seasons at UND. Jeff Panzer would help North Dakota to the National Championship in 2000 and go on to play professionally as well. Jay's nephew, Jaksen, currently plays hockey for Bemidji State University.

== Statistics ==
=== Regular season and playoffs ===
			Regular Season					Playoffs
Season	Team	League	GP	G	A	Pts	PIM	GP	G	A	Pts	PIM
1994–95	Sioux City Musketeers	USHL	48	38	41	60	22	—	—	—	—	—
1995–96	North Dakota	WCHA	26	3	7	10	16	—	—	—	—	—
1996–97	North Dakota	WCHA	43	16	23	39	20	—	—	—	—	—
1997–98	North Dakota	WCHA	35	18	23	41	10	—	—	—	—	—
1998–99	North Dakota	WCHA	39	21	33	54	12	—	—	—	—	—
1999–00	Greenville Grrrowl	ECHL	45	11	23	34	10	—	—	—	—	—
NCAA totals			143	58	86	144	58	—	—	—	—	—

== Awards and honors ==
Award	Year
All-WCHA Second Team	1998–99
AHCA West Second-Team All-American	1998–99
