= Bobby Allen (ice hockey) =

American ice hockey player (born 1978)

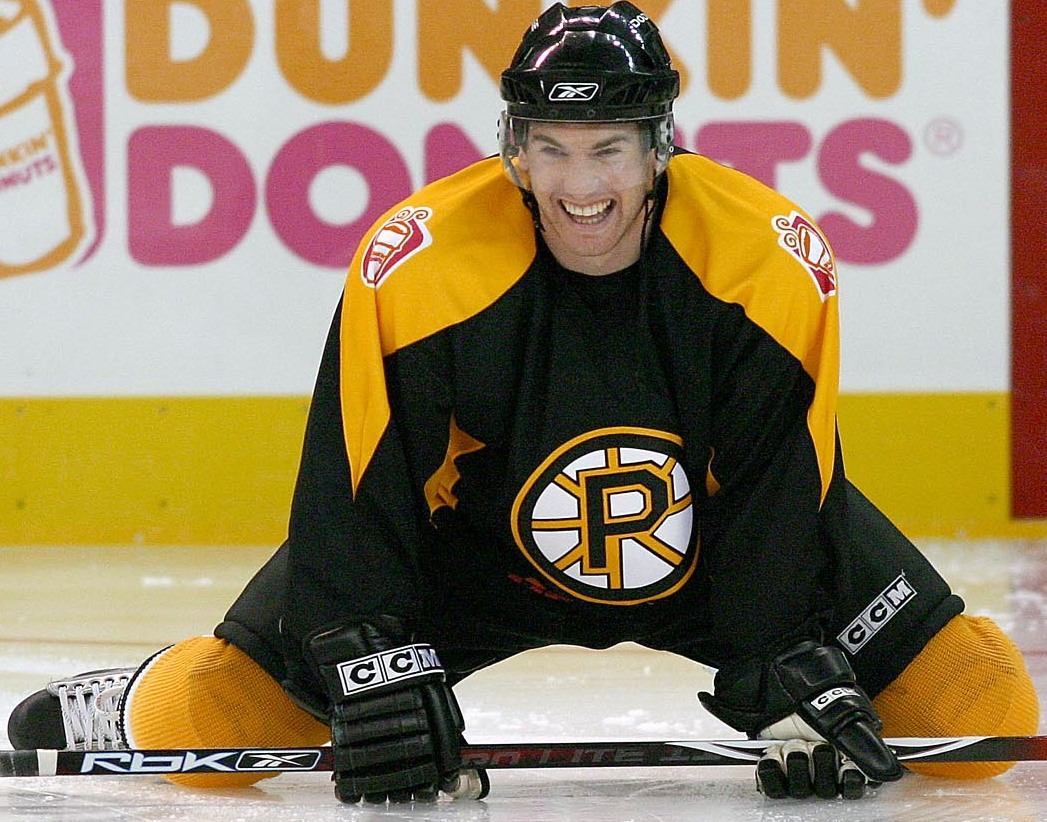
- Allen with the Providence Bruins in 2006
- Born: November 14, 1978 (age 47) Weymouth, Massachusetts, U.S.
- Height: 6 ft 0 in (183 cm)
- Weight: 203 lb (92 kg; 14 st 7 lb)
- Position: Defense
- Shot: Left
- Played for: Edmonton Oilers; Boston Bruins
- NHL draft: 52nd overall, 1998; Boston Bruins
- Playing career: 2003–2008

Robert Paul Allen (born November 14, 1978) is an American former professional ice hockey defenseman who played in the National Hockey League for the Edmonton Oilers and the Boston Bruins.

== Playing career ==
As a youth, Allen played in the 1991 and 1992 Quebec International Pee-Wee Hockey Tournaments with a minor ice hockey team from Beverly, Massachusetts.

Allen played for Boston College, from which he was selected fifty-second in the 1998 NHL entry draft by the Boston Bruins. He was subsequently traded to the Edmonton Oilers on the 2002 trade deadline, in exchange for Sean Brown. He spent the majority of his Oiler career in the American Hockey League, although he did play one game for Edmonton in 2002–03.

On July 22, 2004, he was signed as a free agent by the New Jersey Devils. Allen never played with the Devils due to the NHL Lockout. He was assigned to the Albany River Rats, of the AHL.

On July 17, 2006, Allen was signed as a free agent by his hometown team, the Boston Bruins, to a one-year deal. Allen was assigned to start the 2006–07 season with Boston's AHL affiliate, the Providence Bruins. He spent the first half of the season with Providence before playing his first NHL game in 5 years with the Bruins on January 17, 2007, against the Buffalo Sabres. Allen's physical play earned him a spot with the Bruins for the remaining half of the season. On July 6, 2007, after testing free agency Allen re-signed with the Bruins to a one-year contract for the 2007–08 season.

Allen only managed to play in only 19 games over the season with the Bruins as he was hampered by a back injury. Before the 2008–09 season Allen was diagnosed with two herniated discs in his back and has been unable to play since.

== Personal ==
Allen was born in Weymouth, Massachusetts raised in Hull, Massachusetts, attended Cushing Academy, and currently lives in Hingham, Massachusetts with his wife Natalie and their son Quinn and daughter Caroline.

== Career statistics ==
| | | | Regular season | | | | | Playoffs |
| Season | Team | League | GP | G | A | Pts | PIM | GP | G | A | Pts | PIM |
|---|---|---|---|---|---|---|---|---|---|---|---|---|
| 1997–98 | Boston College | HE | 40 | 7 | 21 | 28 | 49 | — | — | — | — | — |
| 1998–99 | Boston College | HE | 43 | 9 | 23 | 32 | 34 | — | — | — | — | — |
| 1999–00 | Boston College | HE | 42 | 4 | 23 | 27 | 40 | — | — | — | — | — |
| 2000–01 | Boston College | HE | 42 | 5 | 18 | 23 | 30 | — | — | — | — | — |
| 2001–02 | Providence Bruins | AHL | 49 | 5 | 10 | 15 | 18 | — | — | — | — | — |
| 2001–02 | Hamilton Bulldogs | AHL | 10 | 1 | 6 | 7 | 0 | 14 | 0 | 3 | 3 | 6 |
| 2002–03 | Hamilton Bulldogs | AHL | 56 | 1 | 12 | 13 | 24 | 23 | 0 | 5 | 5 | 10 |
| 2002–03 | Edmonton Oilers | NHL | 1 | 0 | 0 | 0 | 0 | — | — | — | — | — |
| 2003–04 | Toronto Roadrunners | AHL | 56 | 5 | 10 | 15 | 18 | 3 | 0 | 2 | 2 | 4 |
| 2004–05 | Albany River Rats | AHL | 66 | 5 | 11 | 16 | 20 | — | — | — | — | — |
| 2005–06 | Albany River Rats | AHL | 68 | 4 | 14 | 18 | 28 | — | — | — | — | — |
| 2006–07 | Providence Bruins | AHL | 31 | 5 | 13 | 18 | 14 | — | — | — | — | — |
| 2006–07 | Boston Bruins | NHL | 31 | 0 | 3 | 3 | 10 | — | — | — | — | — |
| 2007–08 | Boston Bruins | NHL | 19 | 0 | 0 | 0 | 2 | — | — | — | — | — |
| NHL totals | | | 51 | 0 | 3 | 3 | 12 | — | — | — | — | — |

== Awards and honors ==
| Award | Year |
|---|---|
| All-Hockey East Rookie Team | 1997–98 |
| Hockey East All-Tournament Team | 1999 |
| All-Hockey East Second Team | 1999–00 |
| All-Hockey East First Team | 2000–01 |
| AHCA East First-Team All-American | 2000–01 |
| Hockey East All-Tournament Team | 2001 |

Awards and achievements
| Preceded by Mike Mottau | Hockey East Best Defensive Defenseman; 2000–01 | Succeeded by Chris Dyment |
