= Metropolitan Boston Hockey League =

The Metropolitan Boston Hockey League was a youth hockey league founded March 31, 1977, and incorporated in Massachusetts in August 1979.

The Metropolitan Boston Hockey League
City	Boston, MA
Classification	Junior ice hockey
Founded	March 31, 1977
Colors	Gold and Black

The MBHL was unique in youth hockey. The MBHL was classified as an "AAA" or "Tier I" league. Within the league, modified NCAA rules were played, the same as in U.S. college hockey. Slapshots and body checking were allowed at all age levels. The league believed that it was critical to develop those skills before young players had a chance to develop bad habits in their absence. A core belief of the MBHL was that hockey should be “played the way hockey is meant to be played, at any age and by either gender.” The league was also open to young women who felt they were physically capable to "play Metro" with and against boys.

MBHL league play began the first weekend after Labor Day and concluded with playoffs in late March of the following year. No other Minor hockey organization in North America—or the world, permitted body checking or slapshots as early as the Mite level.

The MBHL had Twenty Two original organizations (some teams changed the team names): Assabet Valley Patriots, Acton Colonials, Bay State Sharks, Cape Cod Seahawks, Plymouth County All Stars, North Shore Raiders, Hobomock U.S.A. (became New England Falcons, now Bridgewater Bandits), The Worcester Crusaders, UMass Lowell River Hawks men's ice hockey (formerly Lowell Chiefs, then West River Wolves), Mass Bay Chiefs, St. Moritz Devils and the Springfield Pics. The Bay State Breakers, Boston Jr. Eagles, Boston Jr. Terriers, West River Wolves, Bridgewater Bandits, Middlesex Islanders, Minuteman Flames, Providence Capitals (formerly Providence Friars), South Shore Kings, Merrimack Cardinals, and Top Gun all left the MBHL in 2004 for the Eastern Hockey Federation.

Upon the league's discontinuation after the end of the 2008–2009 season, most remaining teams transferred to the New England Hockey League, which has since been split into the Boston Hockey League and the Elite 9 Hockey League.

== Teams ==
The MBHL had 9 Member Organization in its last season (see table at bottom).

Team	City	Home Rink
Cape Cod Seahawks	Bourne, Massachusetts	Gallo Ice Arena
Capital District Selects	Troy, New York	Frear Park
Connecticut Lazers	Simsbury, Connecticut	International Skating Center of Connecticut
Connecticut Wolves	Northford, Connecticut	Northford Ice
Edgewood Hawks	Cranston, Rhode Island	Schneider Arena
Lowell Jr. River Hawks	Lowell, Massachusetts	Janas Arena
New Hampshire Avalanche	Hooksett, New Hampshire	Ice Den Arena
St. Moritz Devils	Dedham, Massachusetts	Boston Ice Center
Springfield Pics	West Springfield, Massachusetts	Olympia Ice Center
Worcester Crusaders	Worcester, Massachusetts	Buffone Rink

== High school programs fed ==
The MBHL feeds many High School programs.

- Avon Old Farms School
- Catholic Memorial School
- Cushing Academy
- Lawrence Academy at Groton
- Malden Catholic High School
- Matignon High School
- Middlesex School
- Phillips Andover Academy
- Phillips Exeter Academy
- Saint Peter-Marian High School
- St. John's High School
- St. John's Preparatory School
- St. Mark's School
- Saint Sebastian's School
- Thayer Academy
- Worcester Academy
- Walpole High School

== Notable MBHL player alumni ==
NHL, AHL, other pro, NCAA Div I, or drafted

=== Players ===
- Mike Mottau
- Kyle Amaral
- Tom Barasso
- Allen Bourbeau
- Phil Bourque
- Bob Brooke
- Doug Brown
- Ed Campbell
- Jim Campbell
- Bob Carpenter
- Eddie Caron
- John Carter
- Ted Crowley
- Marvin Degon
- John Doherty
- Ted Donato
- Hal Gill
- David Gove
- Mike Grier
- Bill Guerin
- Ned Havern
- Steve Heinze
- Scott Horvath
- Jeff Lazaro
- Jordan LaVallee
- John Lilley
- Shawn McEachern
- Jeff Norton
- Joe Parker
- James Pemberton
- Jeff Pietrasiak
- Tom Poti
- Ron Haines
- Jeremy Roenick
- Kevin Stevens
- Bob Sweeney
- Keith Tkachuk
- Dan Travis
- Peter Trovato
- Noah Welch
- Mike Ruggiero
- Jim Carey
- Scott Young
- Teddy Doherty

=== Coaches ===
- Bob Sweeney
- Ulf Samuelsson
- Scott Greer
- Bobby Carpenter
