= Tom Poti =

American ice hockey player (born 1977)

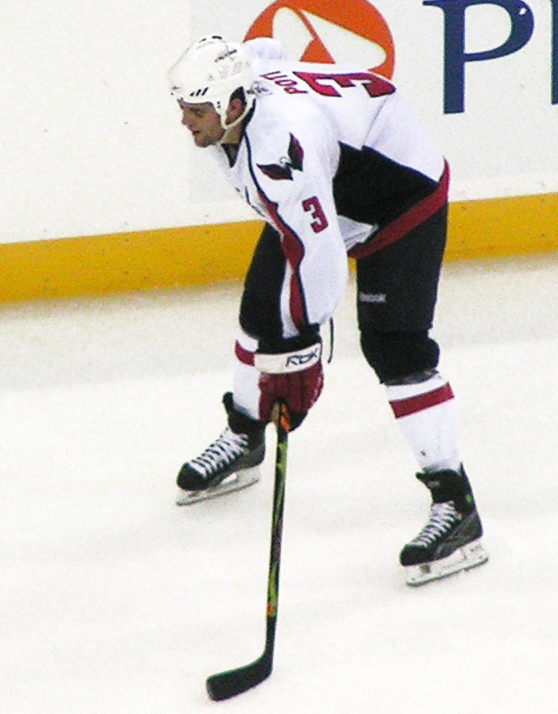
- Poti with the Washington Capitals in 2008
- Born: March 22, 1977 (age 49) Worcester, Massachusetts, U.S.
- Height: 6 ft 3 in (191 cm)
- Weight: 210 lb (95 kg; 15 st 0 lb)
- Position: Defense
- Shot: Left
- Played for: Edmonton Oilers; New York Rangers; New York Islanders; Washington Capitals
- National team: United States
- NHL draft: 59th overall, 1996; Edmonton Oilers
- Playing career: 1998–2013

Thomas Emilio Poti (born March 22, 1977) is an American former professional ice hockey player. He played 14 seasons in the National Hockey League (NHL).

== Playing career ==
As a youth, Poti played in the 1991 Quebec International Pee-Wee Hockey Tournament with a minor ice hockey team from Hartford, Connecticut.

He attended Saint Peter-Marian High School for two years. A graduate of the Cushing Academy, Poti moved on to play for Boston University of Hockey East. At BU in 1998, Poti became the first defenseman since Dave Archambault to win the Beanpot MVP. Poti was drafted in the third round of the 1996 NHL entry draft, 59th overall, by the Edmonton Oilers.

On March 19, 2002, the Rangers acquired Poti and Rem Murray in exchange for Mike York and a fourth round selection in the 2002 NHL entry draft. Poti was the point man on New York's top power-play unit until Fedor Tyutin took over. During his time with the Rangers, Poti became unpopular with his team's fans, to the point that he was booed at home whenever he touched the puck and cheered when he left the ice for a player change.

In the summer of 2006, Poti signed as a free agent with the Rangers' crosstown rival New York Islanders. For the rest of his career, he continued to hear choruses of boos when he touched the puck at Madison Square Garden.

On July 1, 2007, Poti signed a four-year deal with the Washington Capitals worth $3.5 million per year. Poti won his first playoff series with the Capitals when they eliminated the Rangers in seven games on April 28, 2009.

He signed a three-year contract extension with the Capitals in 2010. However, a recurring groin injury held him to only 21 games in 2010–11, and he did not play at all the following season. In September 2011, Washington General Manager George McPhee said that the injury has not improved and Poti's NHL career may be finished. However, after missing the entire 2011-12 season due to the groin issue, Poti was cleared to return upon the start of the lockout-shortened 2012–13 season. He was assigned to the Hershey Bears of the AHL on January 13, 2013 for a conditioning assignment, but was eventually called up to Washington, playing in 16 games. He became a free agent at the end of the season, and he announced his retirement on May 1, 2014, later becoming a part-owner of the Boston Bandits junior ice hockey organization.

== Personal life ==
Poti resides in Sandwich, Massachusetts, with his wife Jessica and their two children. He suffers from severe food allergies. Contact with such foods as chocolate, peanuts, fish, Monosodium glutamate (MSG), and most spices and sauces can be potentially lethal. Poti carries an EpiPen epinephrine auto-injector at all times.

Despite growing up in Massachusetts, home of the Boston Red Sox, Poti is a fan of the New York Yankees.

== Career statistics ==
=== Regular season and playoffs ===
			Regular season					Playoffs
Season	Team	League	GP	G	A	Pts	PIM	GP	G	A	Pts	PIM
1993–94	Cushing Academy	HS-Prep	30	10	35	45	—	—	—	—	—	—
1994–95	Cushing Academy	HS-Prep	36	17	54	71	35	—	—	—	—	—
1994–95	Central Mass Outlaws	MBHL	8	8	10	18	—	—	—	—	—	—
1995–96	Cushing Academy	HS-Prep	29	14	59	73	18	—	—	—	—	—
1996–97	Boston University	HE	38	4	17	21	54	—	—	—	—	—
1997–98	Boston University	HE	38	13	29	42	60	—	—	—	—	—
1998–99	Edmonton Oilers	NHL	73	5	16	21	42	4	0	1	1	2
1999–2000	Edmonton Oilers	NHL	76	9	26	35	65	5	0	1	1	0
2000–01	Edmonton Oilers	NHL	81	12	20	32	60	6	0	2	2	2
2001–02	Edmonton Oilers	NHL	55	1	16	17	32	—	—	—	—	—
2001–02	New York Rangers	NHL	11	1	7	8	2	—	—	—	—	—
2002–03	New York Rangers	NHL	80	11	37	48	58	—	—	—	—	—
2003–04	New York Rangers	NHL	67	10	14	24	47	—	—	—	—	—
2005–06	New York Rangers	NHL	73	3	20	23	70	4	0	0	0	2
2006–07	New York Islanders	NHL	78	6	38	44	74	5	0	3	3	6
2007–08	Washington Capitals	NHL	71	2	27	29	46	7	0	1	1	8
2008–09	Washington Capitals	NHL	52	3	10	13	28	14	2	5	7	4
2009–10	Washington Capitals	NHL	70	4	20	24	42	6	0	4	4	5
2010–11	Washington Capitals	NHL	21	2	5	7	8	—	—	—	—	—
2012–13	Hershey Bears	AHL	2	1	0	1	0	—	—	—	—	—
2012–13	Washington Capitals	NHL	16	0	2	2	2	—	—	—	—	—
NHL totals			824	69	258	327	588	51	2	17	19	29

Medal record

Ice hockey

Representing United States

Olympic Games
Silver medal – second place	2002 Salt Lake City	

=== International ===
Year	Team	Event	Result	GP	G	A	Pts	PIM
1996	United States	WJC	5th	6	0	3	3	0
1997	United States	WJC	2nd place, silver medalist(s)	6	1	2	3	4
2002	United States	OG	2nd place, silver medalist(s)	6	0	1	1	4
Junior totals				12	1	5	6	4
Senior totals				6	0	1	1	4

== Awards and honors ==
Award	Year
NCAA
All-Hockey East Rookie Team	1996–97
All-NCAA All-Tournament Team	1997
All-Hockey East First Team	1997–98
AHCA East First-Team All-American	1997–98
NHL
All-Rookie Team	1998–99
