= Erik Andersson (ice hockey, born 1971) =

Swedish ice hockey player

- Born: 19 August 1971 (age 55) Stockholm, Sweden
- Height: 6 ft 3 in (191 cm)
- Weight: 209 lb (95 kg; 14 st 13 lb)
- Position: Left wing
- Shot: Left
- Played for: AIK IF; Calgary Flames
- NHL draft: 112th overall, 1990; Los Angeles Kings; 70th overall, 1997; Calgary Flames
- Playing career: 1990–2001

Erik Folke Andersson (born 19 August 1971) is a Swedish former professional ice hockey player who played 12 games in the National Hockey League (NHL) with the Calgary Flames. First drafted by the Los Angeles Kings in the 6th round of the 1990 NHL entry draft, Andersson chose not to sign with the Kings. In the 1997 draft, Andersson was selected again, this time in the 3rd round by Calgary. Andersson played two seasons professionally in North America, mainly in the minor leagues, before returning to Sweden to play in the Elitserien.

Before his pro career, Andersson played at the University of Denver.

== Career statistics ==
=== Regular season and playoffs ===
			Regular season					Playoffs
Season	Team	League	GP	G	A	Pts	PIM	GP	G	A	Pts	PIM
1988–89	Vallentuna BK	SWE-2	24	2	7	9	4	—	—	—	—	—
1989–90	Danderyds HC	SWE-2	30	14	5	19	18	—	—	—	—	—
1990–91	AIK	SWE	32	1	1	2	10	—	—	—	—	—
1991–92	AIK	SWE	3	0	0	0	0	—	—	—	—	—
1991–92	Vallentuna BK	SWE-3	11	5	5	10	14	—	—	—	—	—
1992–93	University of Denver	WCHA	—	—	—	—	—	—	—	—	—	—
1993–94	University of Denver	WCHA	38	10	20	30	26	—	—	—	—	—
1994–95	University of Denver	WCHA	42	12	19	31	42	—	—	—	—	—
1995–96	University of Denver	WCHA	39	12	35	47	40	—	—	—	—	—
1996–97	University of Denver	WCHA	39	17	17	34	42	—	—	—	—	—
1997–98	Calgary Flames	NHL	12	2	1	3	8	—	—	—	—	—
1997–98	Saint John Flames	AHL	29	5	9	14	29	—	—	—	—	—
1998–99	Saint John Flames	AHL	5	0	0	0	4	—	—	—	—	—
1998–99	Indianapolis Ice	IHL	48	5	7	12	24	4	0	0	0	12
1999–00	AIK	SWE	50	7	8	15	62	—	—	—	—	—
2000–01	AIK	SWE	27	4	4	8	16	—	—	—	—	—
SWE totals			112	12	13	25	88	—	—	—	—	—
NHL totals			12	2	1	3	8	—	—	—	—	—

=== International ===
Year	Team	Event	GP	G	A	Pts	PIM
1989	Sweden	EJC	6	5	5	10	6
1991	Sweden	WJC	7	2	1	3	4
Junior totals			13	7	6	13	10
