= Curtis Murphy =

Canadian ice hockey player

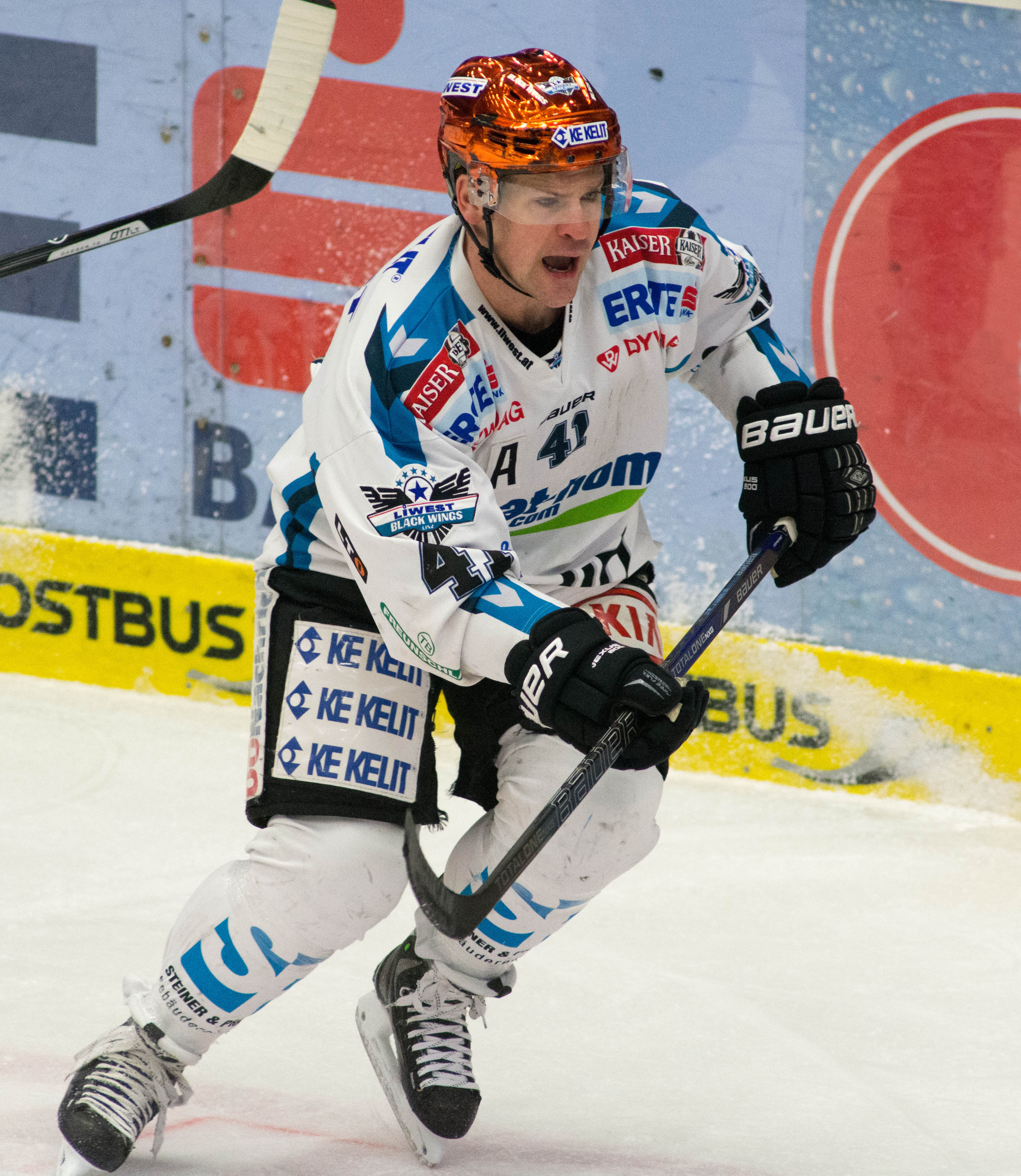
- Born: December 3, 1975 (age 50) Kerrobert, Saskatchewan, Canada
- Height: 5 ft 8 in (173 cm)
- Weight: 195 lb (88 kg; 13 st 13 lb)
- Position: Defence
- Shot: Right
- Played for: Minnesota Wild; Lokomotiv Yaroslavl; SCL Tigers; EHC Black Wings Linz
- NHL draft: Undrafted
- Playing career: 1998–2015

Curtis Murphy (born December 3, 1975) is a Canadian former professional ice hockey defenceman.

== Career ==
Murphy was signed as an undrafted free agent by the Minnesota Wild in on June 18, 2001, and he played one game in the National Hockey League with the Wild in the 2002–03 season.

Murphy was a member of Team Canada at the 2007 Spengler Cup. He has won two American Hockey League Calder Cups, one in 2003 with the Houston Aeros and one in 2004 with the Milwaukee Admirals.

Murphy moved to Europe in 2007, signing for SC Langnau in the Swiss Nationalliga A. In 2011, he moved to the Erste Bank Eishockey Liga in Austria and signed for EHC Black Wings Linz.

== Career statistics ==
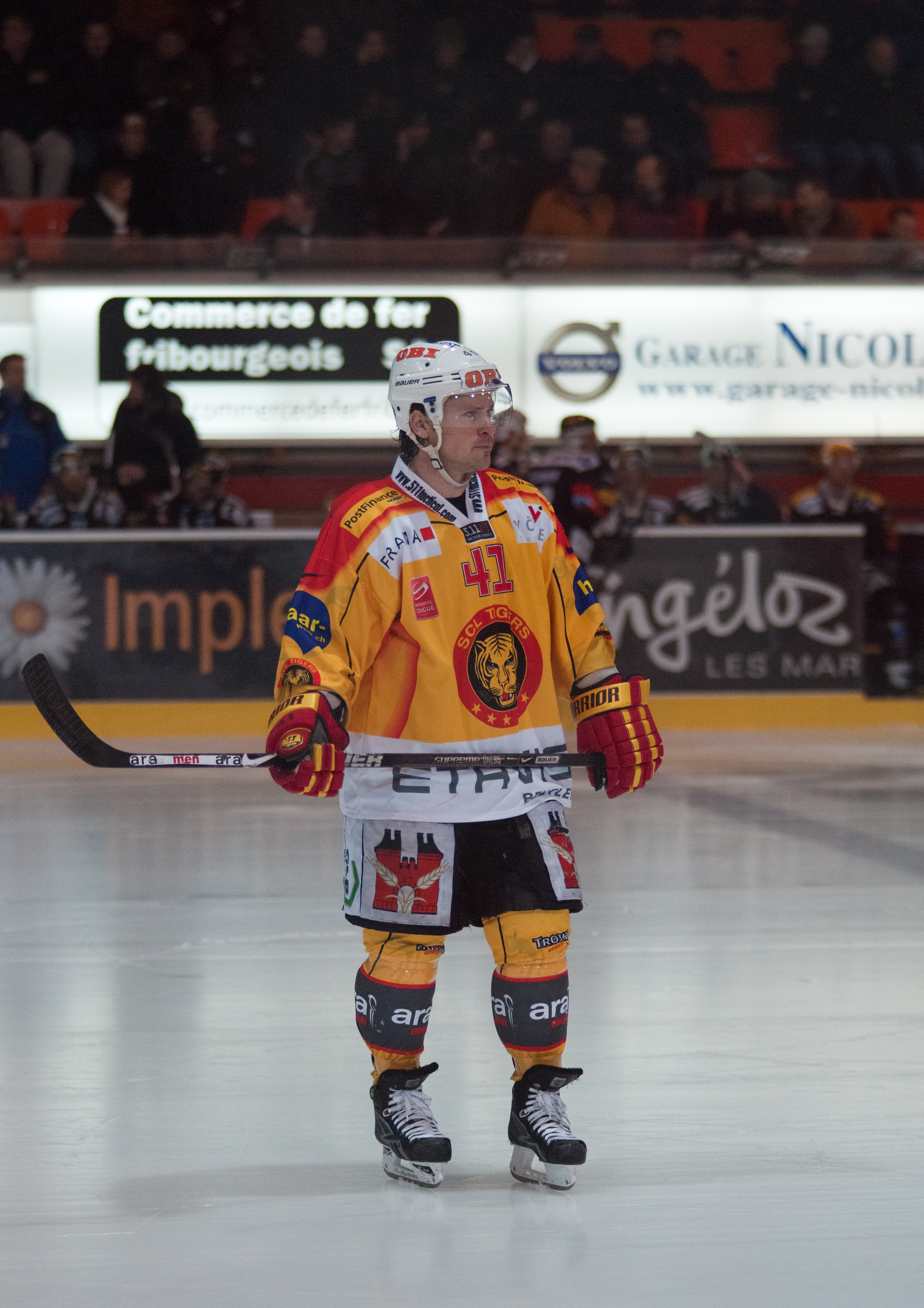
Murphy with the SCL Tigers.

			Regular season					Playoffs
Season	Team	League	GP	G	A	Pts	PIM	GP	G	A	Pts	PIM
1993–94	Nipawin Hawks	SJHL	60	21	33	54	81	—	—	—	—	—
1994–95	University of North Dakota	WCHA	33	6	10	16	28	—	—	—	—	—
1995–96	University of North Dakota	WCHA	38	6	12	18	58	—	—	—	—	—
1996–97	University of North Dakota	WCHA	43	12	30	42	36	—	—	—	—	—
1997–98	University of North Dakota	WCHA	39	8	34	42	78	—	—	—	—	—
1998–99	Orlando Solar Bears	IHL	80	22	35	57	60	17	4	5	9	16
1999–2000	Orlando Solar Bears	IHL	81	8	43	51	59	6	0	2	2	6
2000–01	Orlando Solar Bears	IHL	51	19	30	49	55	16	3	11	14	18
2001–02	Houston Aeros	AHL	80	12	35	47	75	14	2	4	6	10
2002–03	Houston Aeros	AHL	80	23	31	54	63	23	2	7	9	22
2002–03	Minnesota Wild	NHL	1	0	0	0	0	—	—	—	—	—
2003–04	Milwaukee Admirals	AHL	79	17	36	53	51	22	4	8	12	12
2004–05	Lokomotiv Yaroslavl	RSL	60	6	6	12	50	9	1	1	2	6
2005–06	Houston Aeros	AHL	80	14	53	67	76	8	0	4	4	4
2006–07	Houston Aeros	AHL	75	10	35	45	52	—	—	—	—	—
2007–08	SCL Tigers	NLA	50	7	20	27	56	—	—	—	—	—
2008–09	SCL Tigers	NLA	27	3	17	20	38	—	—	—	—	—
2009–10	SCL Tigers	NLA	50	7	16	23	32	—	—	—	—	—
2010–11	SCL Tigers	NLA	47	5	17	22	46	3	0	0	0	0
2011–12	EHC Black Wings Linz	EBEL	50	16	28	44	34	17	2	11	13	24
2012–13	EHC Black Wings Linz	EBEL	53	9	29	38	48	13	2	4	6	10
2013–14	EHC Black Wings Linz	EBEL	54	10	29	39	46	8	0	4	4	8
2014–15	EHC Black Wings Linz	EBEL	51	1	18	19	36	12	2	3	5	12
NHL totals			1	0	0	0	0	—	—	—	—	—
AHL totals			394	76	190	266	317	67	8	23	31	48
NLA totals			174	22	70	92	172	3	0	0	0	0
EBEL totals			210	36	104	140	164	50	6	22	28	54

== Awards and honours ==
Award	Year
All-WCHA First Team	1996–97
AHCA West Second-Team All-American	1996–97
WCHA All-Tournament Team	1997, 1998
All-NCAA All-Tournament Team	1997
All-WCHA First Team	1997–98
AHCA West First-Team All-American	1997–98

Awards and achievements
Preceded by Mike Crowley	WCHA Player of the Year; 1997–98	Succeeded by Jason Blake
