= Kris Porter =

Canadian ice hockey player

- Born: August 31, 1974 (age 51) Wawota, Saskatchewan
- Height: 6 ft 2 in (188 cm)
- Weight: 190 lb (86 kg; 13 st 8 lb)
- Position: Forward
- Played for: Fresno Falcons (WCHL, ECHL); Johnstown Chiefs (ECHL); New Orleans Brass (ECHL); Kentucky Thoroughblades (AHL); Worcester IceCats (AHL); Merrimack Warriors (HE)
- NHL draft: Undrafted
- Playing career: 1999–2006

Kris Porter (born August 31, 1974) is a Canadian former professional ice hockey forward who played most of his career in the ECHL and WCHL.

== Early life and education ==
Porter was born in Wawota, Saskatchewan and later moved to Wynyard, Saskatchewan. He played for a midget level team in his small town throughout high school. Porter played defense until age 15, when he moved to forward. There he was a prolific goal scorer. After high school Porter played junior hockey for the Weyburn Red Wings. In his last year of junior hockey he led the Saskatchewan Junior Hockey League in scoring.

Though he received offers from Ivy League programs Porter attended Merrimack College and played there from 1995 to 1999. Though he initially lacked skating skill compared to his teammates in his first season, by his sophomore year Porter had greatly improved and shared the team's Most Improved Player award with Rejean Stringer. He led the team in goals scored in the 1996–97 season and led the team in overall scoring the next two years. In the 1997–98 season he scored the second most goals in the nation. In one game that season he scored 4 goals in a 9-1 victory over Air Force. While at Merrimack he spent four consecutive seasons on the Hockey East All-Academic team.

== Professional career ==
After leaving Merrimack, Porter played three games for the Worcester IceCats of the AHL in the 1998–99 season. In the 1999–2000 he split his time between the Kentucky Thoroughblades of the AHL and the New Orleans Brass and Johnstown Chiefs of the ECHL. The next year, he moved to the Fresno Falcons of the now-defunct WCHL. Porter played a key role in Fresno's 2003 playoff run. He played for Fresno for six seasons before retiring from professional hockey.

== Career statistics ==
			Regular season					Playoffs
Season	Team	League	GP	G	A	Pts	PIM	GP	G	A	Pts	PIM
1995–96	Merrimack College	HE	25	4	9	13	18	—	—	—	—	—
1996–97	Merrimack College	HE	34	16	17	33	47	—	—	—	—	—
1997–98	Merrimack College	HE	38	33	21	54	48	—	—	—	—	—
1998–99	Merrimack College	HE	36	24	21	45	48	—	—	—	—	—
1998–99	Worcester IceCats	AHL	3	0	0	0	2	—	—	—	—	—
1999–2000	Kentucky Thoroughblades	AHL	3	0	1	1	0	—	—	—	—	—
1999–2000	New Orleans Brass	ECHL	35	6	7	13	16	—	—	—	—	—
1999–2000	Johnstown Chiefs	ECHL	30	13	13	26	16	7	4	1	5	8
2000–01	Fresno Falcons	WCHL	30	17	16	33	18	5	1	2	3	6
2001–02	Fresno Falcons	WCHL	54	29	27	56	44	15	6	12	18	14
2002–03	Fresno Falcons	WCHL	64	35	39	74	74	13	3	8	11	14
2003–04	Fresno Falcons	ECHL	70	22	30	52	66	—	—	—	—	—
2004–05	Fresno Falcons	ECHL	1	1	0	1	0	—	—	—	—	—
2005–06	Fresno Falcons	ECHL	9	0	1	1	6	—	—	—	—	—
ECHL totals			145	42	51	93	104	7	4	1	5	8
