= 1997 WCHA men's ice hockey tournament =

Sporting event

1997 WCHA Men's ice hockey tournament
- Dates: March 7–15, 1997
- Teams: 10
- Finals site: Civic Center; St. Paul, Minnesota
- Champions: North Dakota (6th title)
- Winning coach: Dean Blais (1st title)
- MVP: David Hoogsteen (North Dakota)
- Attendance: 56,707
- WCHA Men's Ice Hockey Tournaments

The 1997 WCHA Men's Ice Hockey Tournament was the 38th conference playoff in league history and 45th season where a WCHA champion was crowned. The tournament was played between March 7 and March 15, 1997. First round games were played at home team campus sites while all 'Final Five' matches were held at the Civic Center in St. Paul, Minnesota. By winning the tournament, North Dakota was awarded the Broadmoor Trophy and received the WCHA's automatic bid to the 1997 NCAA Division I Men's Ice Hockey Tournament.

== Format ==
The first round of the postseason tournament featured a best-of-three games format. All ten conference teams participated in the tournament and were seeded No. 1 through No. 10 according to their final conference standing, with a tiebreaker system used to seed teams with an identical number of points accumulated. The top five seeded teams each earned home ice and hosted one of the lower seeded teams.

The winners of the first round series advanced to the Civic Center for the WCHA Final Five, the collective name for the quarterfinal, semifinal, and championship rounds. The Final Five uses a single-elimination format. Teams were re-seeded No. 1 through No. 5 according to the final regular season conference standings, with the top three teams automatically advancing to the semifinals and the remaining two playing in a quarterfinal game. The semifinal pitted the top remaining seed against the winner of the quarterfinal game while the two other teams that received byes were matched against one another with the winners advancing to the championship game and the losers meeting in a Third Place contest. The Tournament Champion received an automatic bid to the 1997 NCAA Division I Men's Ice Hockey Tournament.

=== Conference standings ===
Note: GP = Games played; W = Wins; L = Losses; T = Ties; PTS = Points; GF = Goals For; GA = Goals Against

1996–97 Western Collegiate Hockey Association standings
	Conference							Overall					
	GP	W	L	T	PTS	GF	GA	GP	W	L	T	GF	GA
North Dakota†*	32	21	10	1	43	137	105	43	31	10	2	190	130
Minnesota†	32	21	10	1	43	129	94	42	28	13	1	179	128
St. Cloud State	32	18	10	4	40	127	105	40	23	13	4	152	130
Colorado College	32	17	11	4	38	121	107	44	25	15	4	169	141
Denver	32	17	11	4	38	127	99	41	24	13	4	163	122
Minnesota-Duluth	32	15	13	4	34	115	111	38	18	16	4	133	131
Wisconsin	32	15	15	2	32	115	115	38	15	21	2	132	151
Northern Michigan	32	9	21	2	20	78	127	40	13	24	3	108	152
Alaska-Anchorage	32	7	21	4	18	75	109	36	9	23	4	86	126
Michigan Tech	32	5	23	4	14	81	133	39	8	27	4	98	155
Championship: North Dakota † indicates conference regular season champion * indicates conference tournament champion Final rankings: USA Today/American Hockey Magazine Coaches Poll Top 10 Poll

== Bracket ==
Teams are reseeded after the first round

First Round; March 7–8
1	North Dakota	4	3	—
10	Michigan Tech	1	0	—
2	Minnesota	8	5	—
9	Alaska-Anchorage	2	1	—
3	St. Cloud State	5	3	—
8	Northern Michigan	2	2	—
4	Colorado College	9	1****	—
7	Wisconsin	3	0	—
5	Denver	4	7	—
6	Minnesota-Duluth	1	3	—

Quarterfinal; March 13
4	Colorado College	5
5	Denver	2

Semifinals; March 14
1	North Dakota	5
4	Colorado College	1
2	Minnesota	5*
3	St. Cloud State	4

Championship; March 15
1	North Dakota	4*
2	Minnesota	3

Note: * denotes overtime period(s)

=== Quarterfinals ===
==== (1) North Dakota vs. (10) Michigan Tech ====
March 7	North Dakota	4 – 1	Michigan Tech	Ralph Engelstad Arena

March 8	North Dakota	3 – 0	Michigan Tech	Ralph Engelstad Arena

North Dakota won series 2–0

==== (2) Minnesota vs. (9) Alaska-Anchorage ====
March 7	Minnesota	8 – 2	Alaska-Anchorage	Mariucci Arena

March 8	Minnesota	5 – 1	Alaska-Anchorage	Mariucci Arena

Minnesota won series 2–0

==== (3) St. Cloud State vs. (8) Northern Michigan ====
March 7	St. Cloud State	5 – 2	Northern Michigan	National Hockey Center

March 8	St. Cloud State	3 – 2	Northern Michigan	National Hockey Center

St. Cloud State won series 2–0

==== (4) Colorado College vs. (7) Wisconsin ====
March 7	Colorado College	9 – 3	Wisconsin	Cadet Ice Arena

March 8	Colorado College	1 – 0	4OT	Wisconsin	Cadet Ice Arena

Colorado College won series 2–0

==== (5) Denver vs. (6) Minnesota-Duluth ====
March 7	Denver	4 – 1	Minnesota-Duluth	DU Arena

March 8	Denver	7 – 3	Minnesota-Duluth	DU Arena

Denver won series 2–0

=== Quarterfinal ===
==== (4) Colorado College vs. (5) Denver ====
March 13	Colorado College	5 – 2	Denver	Civic Center

=== Semifinals ===
==== (1) North Dakota vs. (4) Colorado College ====
March 14	North Dakota	5 – 1	Colorado College	Civic Center

==== (2) Minnesota vs. (3) St. Cloud State ====
March 14	Minnesota	5 – 4	OT	St. Cloud State	Civic Center

=== Third Place ===
==== (3) St. Cloud State vs. (4) Colorado College ====
March 15	St. Cloud State	0 – 6	Colorado College	Civic Center

=== Championship ===
==== (1) North Dakota vs. (2) Minnesota ====
March 15	North Dakota	4 – 3	OT	Minnesota	Civic Center

== Tournament awards ==
=== All-Tournament Team ===
- F Kevin Hoogsteen (North Dakota)
- F Ryan Kraft (North Dakota)
- F Toby Petersen (Colorado College)
- D Curtis Murphy (North Dakota)
- D Brian LaFleur (Minnesota)
- G Aaron Schweitzer (North Dakota)

=== MVP ===
- David Hoogsteen (North Dakota)

== See also ==
- Western Collegiate Hockey Association men's champions
