= 2002–03 Eredivisie (ice hockey) season =

Dutch ice hockey season

The 2002–03 Eredivisie season was the 43rd season of the Eredivisie, the top level of ice hockey in the Netherlands. Five teams participated in the league, and the Boretti Tigers Amsterdam won the championship.

== Regular season ==
=== Phase 1 ===
	Club	GP	W	OTW	OTL	L	GF	GA	Pts
1.	Boretti Tigers Amsterdam	8	7	0	0	1	44	29	21
2.	Tilburg Trappers	8	3	2	0	3	29	25	13
3.	Nijmegen Tigers	8	2	1	2	3	24	33	10
4.	Heerenveen Flyers	8	3	0	0	5	27	28	9
5.	Eaters Geleen	8	2	0	1	5	21	30	7

=== Phase 2 ===
	Club	GP	W	OTW	OTL	L	GF	GA	Pts
1.	Nijmegen Tigers	8	6	1	0	1	44	27	20
2.	Tilburg Trappers	8	6	0	0	2	33	21	18
3.	Boretti Tigers Amsterdam	8	4	0	0	4	48	40	12
4.	Heerenveen Flyers	8	2	0	1	5	31	39	7
5.	Eaters Geleen	8	1	0	0	7	23	52	3

=== Phase 3 ===
	Club	GP	W	OTW	OTL	L	GF	GA	Pts
1.	Boretti Tigers Amsterdam	8	7	0	0	1	48	25	21
2.	Heerenveen Flyers	8	5	0	0	3	44	27	15
3.	Nijmegen Tigers	8	5	0	0	3	40	37	15
4.	Tilburg Trappers	8	3	0	0	5	26	27	9
5.	Eaters Geleen	8	0	0	0	8	22	64	0

=== Phase 4 ===
	Club	GP	W	OTW	OTL	L	GF	GA	Pts (Bonus)
1.	Boretti Tigers Amsterdam	16	10	4	1	1	83	48	49(10)
2.	Nijmegen Tigers	16	7	1	1	7	66	64	32(8)
3.	Heerenveen Flyers	16	7	1	2	6	56	59	30(7)
4.	Tilburg Trappers	16	5	3	0	8	57	57	28(5)
5.	Eaters Geleen	16	2	0	5	9	43	77	11(0)

== Playoffs ==
Semi-finals
Nijmegen Tigers	3
Heerenveen Flyers	1
Boretti Tigers Amsterdam	3
Tilburg Trappers	2

Final
Nijmegen Tigers	2
Boretti Tigers Amsterdam	3
Third place
not held
