= Casey Hankinson =

American ice hockey player (born 1976)

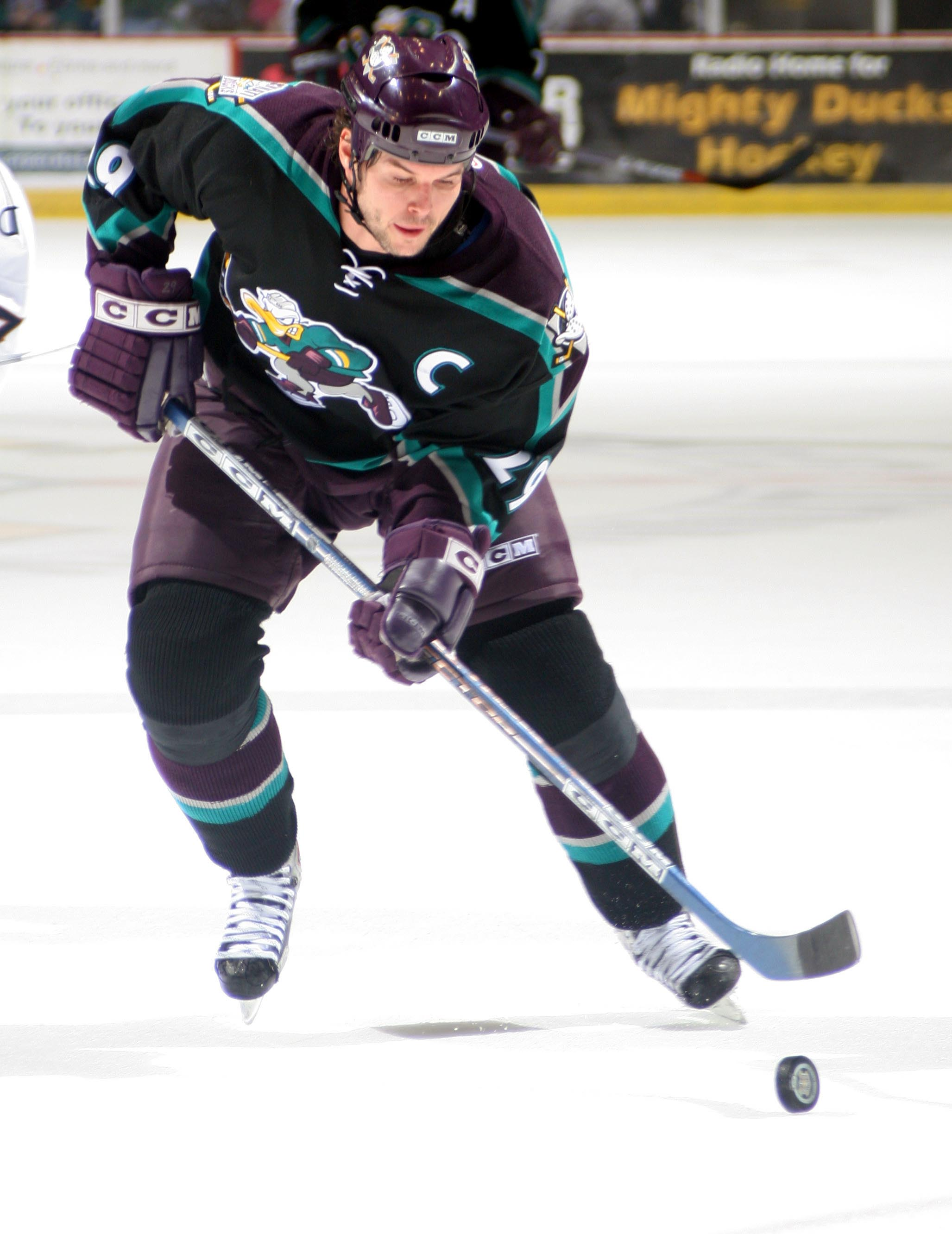
- Hankinson with the Cincinnati Mighty Ducks in 2005
- Born: May 8, 1976 (age 50) Edina, Minnesota, U.S.
- Height: 6 ft 1 in (185 cm)
- Weight: 202 lb (92 kg; 14 st 6 lb)
- Position: Right wing
- Shot: Left
- Played for: Chicago Blackhawks; Mighty Ducks of Anaheim
- National team: United States
- NHL draft: 201st overall, 1995; Chicago Blackhawks
- Playing career: 1998–2005

Casey John Hankinson (born May 8, 1976) is an American former professional ice hockey player whose career lasted from 1998 to 2005. He is best remembered for his significant contributions to the American Hockey League (AHL), particularly with the Norfolk Admirals. In addition to his success in the AHL, Hankinson also appeared in a total of 18 National Hockey League (NHL) games, suiting up for the Chicago Blackhawks early in his career and later for the Mighty Ducks of Anaheim. Beyond his club play, he also represented the United States on the international stage, competing in the 1996 World Junior Championships.

== Playing career ==
While playing for the University of Minnesota, Hankinson was selected 201st overall by the Blackhawks in the 1995 NHL entry draft. He became a key offensive contributor with their AHL affiliate, the Norfolk Admirals, earning 14 NHL appearances with the Blackhawks. In 2003, he joined the Anaheim organization, adding four more NHL games while spending most of the season with their AHL affiliate, the Cincinnati Mighty Ducks. After a brief stint in Switzerland and another year in Cincinnati, Hankinson retired from professional hockey and later transitioned into business, becoming an Executive Vice President at Ryan Companies.

== Personal life ==
Hankinson is married to his wife, Holli, and the couple shares a fulfilling family life as parents to three children.

In 1994, Hankinson was inducted into the Edina Athletic Hall of Fame. This special recognition also placed him alongside his family members, as his father, John, and his two brothers had previously been inducted into the same Hall of Fame.

== Career statistics ==
=== Regular season and playoffs ===
			Regular season					Playoffs
Season	Team	League	GP	G	A	Pts	PIM	GP	G	A	Pts	PIM
1992–93	Edina High School	HS-MN	25	20	26	46	—	—	—	—	—	—
1993–94	Edina High School	HS-MN	24	21	20	41	50	—	—	—	—	—
1994–95	University of Minnesota	WCHA	33	7	1	8	86	—	—	—	—	—
1995–96	University of Minnesota	WCHA	39	16	19	35	101	—	—	—	—	—
1996–97	University of Minnesota	WCHA	42	17	24	41	79	—	—	—	—	—
1997–98	University of Minnesota	WCHA	35	10	12	22	81	—	—	—	—	—
1998–99	Portland Pirates	AHL	72	10	13	23	106	—	—	—	—	—
1999–00	Cleveland Lumberjacks	IHL	82	7	22	29	140	2	0	0	0	2
2000–01	Chicago Blackhawks	NHL	11	0	1	1	9	—	—	—	—	—
2000–01	Norfolk Admirals	AHL	69	30	21	51	74	9	5	4	9	2
2001–02	Chicago Blackhawks	NHL	3	0	0	0	0	—	—	—	—	—
2001–02	Norfolk Admirals	AHL	72	19	30	49	85	4	1	2	3	0
2002–03	Norfolk Admirals	AHL	78	27	28	55	59	9	4	3	7	10
2003–04	Mighty Ducks of Anaheim	NHL	4	0	0	0	0	—	—	—	—	—
2003–04	Cincinnati Mighty Ducks	AHL	78	15	23	38	123	9	4	1	5	10
2004–05	HC La Chaux–de–Fonds	NLB	4	2	1	3	6	—	—	—	—	—
2004–05	Cincinnati Mighty Ducks	AHL	54	4	7	11	92	12	2	4	6	36
AHL totals			423	105	122	227	539	43	16	14	30	58
NHL totals			18	0	1	1	13	—	—	—	—	—

=== International ===
Year	Team	Event	GP	G	A	Pts	PIM
1996	United States	WJC	6	0	0	0	25
Junior totals			6	0	0	0	25
