= 1994–95 USHL season =

- League: United States Hockey League
- Sport: Ice hockey
- Duration: Regular season September 1994 – March 1995; Postseason; March – April 1995
- Games: 48
- Teams: 11

Regular season
- Anderson Cup: Des Moines Buccaneers

Clark Cup Playoffs
- Finals champions: Des Moines Buccaneers
- Runners-up: Omaha Lancers

USHL seasons
- ← 1993–94 1995–96 →

The 1994–95 USHL season was the 16th season of the United States Hockey League as an all-junior league. The regular season began in September 1994 and concluded in March 1995. The Des Moines Buccaneers won the Anderson Cup as regular season champions. The Des Moines Buccaneers also defeated the Omaha Lancers 3 games to 2 for the Clark Cup.

== Member changes ==
- The Green Bay Gamblers joined the league as an expansion franchise.

== Regular season ==
Final standings

Note: GP = Games played; W = Wins; L = Losses; T = Ties; OTL = Overtime losses; GF = Goals for; GA = Goals against; PTS = Points; x = clinched playoff berth; y = clinched league title

Team	GP	W	L	T	OTL	Pts	GF	GA
xy – Des Moines Buccaneers	48	38	5	5	0	81	290	144
x – Omaha Lancers	48	30	11	4	3	67	218	146
x – St. Paul Vulcans	48	31	14	2	1	65	211	166
x – Sioux City Musketeers	48	26	15	4	3	59	230	188
x – Thunder Bay Flyers	48	27	18	1	2	57	216	184
x – Dubuque Fighting Saints	48	24	18	4	2	54	175	169
x – Rochester Mustangs	48	23	24	1	0	47	198	232
x – North Iowa Huskies	48	17	26	5	0	39	183	231
Waterloo Black Hawks	48	14	27	2	5	35	161	205
Wisconsin Capitols	48	10	32	1	5	26	145	245
Green Bay Gamblers	48	9	34	1	4	23	147	264

=== Statistics ===
==== Scoring leaders ====
The following players led the league in regular season points at the completion of all regular season games.

Player	Team	GP	G	A	Pts	PIM
David Hoogsteen	Thunder Bay Flyers	48	40	56	96	34
Simon Lacroix	Thunder Bay Flyers	47	36	51	87	40
Curtis Bois	Thunder Bay Flyers	47	34	52	86	161
Eric Silverman	Sioux City Musketeers	48	38	47	85	65
Jay Panzer	Sioux City Musketeers	48	38	41	79	38
Brad Frattaroli	Des Moines Buccaneers	48	35	37	72	59
Tom Philion	Rochester Mustangs	48	17	54	71	20
Jason Sessa	Rochester Mustangs	47	45	22	67	81
Reggie Berg	Des Moines Buccaneers	35	30	35	65	75
Craig Hagkull	Des Moines Buccaneers	48	30	35	65	58

== Clark Cup playoffs ==
Teams were reseeded after the quarterfinal round.

Quarterfinal (Best-of-7)
1	Des Moines Buccaneers	4
8	North Iowa Huskies	0
2	Omaha Lancers	4
7	Rochester Mustangs	3
3	St. Paul Vulcans	2
6	Dubuque Fighting Saints	4
4	Sioux City Musketeers	4
5	Thunder Bay Flyers	2

Semifinal (Best-of-5)
1	Des Moines Buccaneers	3
6	Dubuque Fighting Saints	0
2	Omaha Lancers	3
4	Sioux City Musketeers	1

Championship (Best-of-5)
1	Des Moines Buccaneers	3
2	Omaha Lancers	2

Note: * denotes overtime period(s)

== Awards ==
Award	Recipient	Team
Player of the Year	Scott Swanson	Omaha Lancers
Forward of the Year	David Hoogsteen	Thunder Bay Flyers
Defenseman of the Year	Scott Swanson	Omaha Lancers
Goaltender of the Year	Aaron Vicker	Omaha Lancers
Coach of the Year	Bob Ferguson	Des Moines Buccaneers
