= 2003–04 Eredivisie (ice hockey) season =

Dutch ice hockey season

The 2003–04 Eredivisie season was the 44th season of the Eredivisie, the top level of ice hockey in the Netherlands. Four teams participated in the league, and the Amsterdam Bulldogs won the championship.

== Regular season ==
	Club	GP	W	OTW	OTL	L	GF	GA	Pts (Bonus)
1.	Amsterdam Bulldogs	6	4	0	0	2	34	22	14(2)
2.	Heerenveen Flyers	6	3	0	0	3	28	20	12(3)
3.	Tilburg Trappers	6	3	1	0	2	19	23	12(1)
4.	Eaters Geleen	6	1	0	1	4	21	37	4(0)

== Playoffs ==
Semi-finals
Amsterdam Bulldogs	3
Eaters Geleen	0
Heerenveen Flyers	2
Tilburg Trappers	3

Final
Amsterdam Bulldogs	3
Tilburg Trappers	2
Third place
not held
