= Toby Petersen =

American ice hockey player and coach (born 1978)

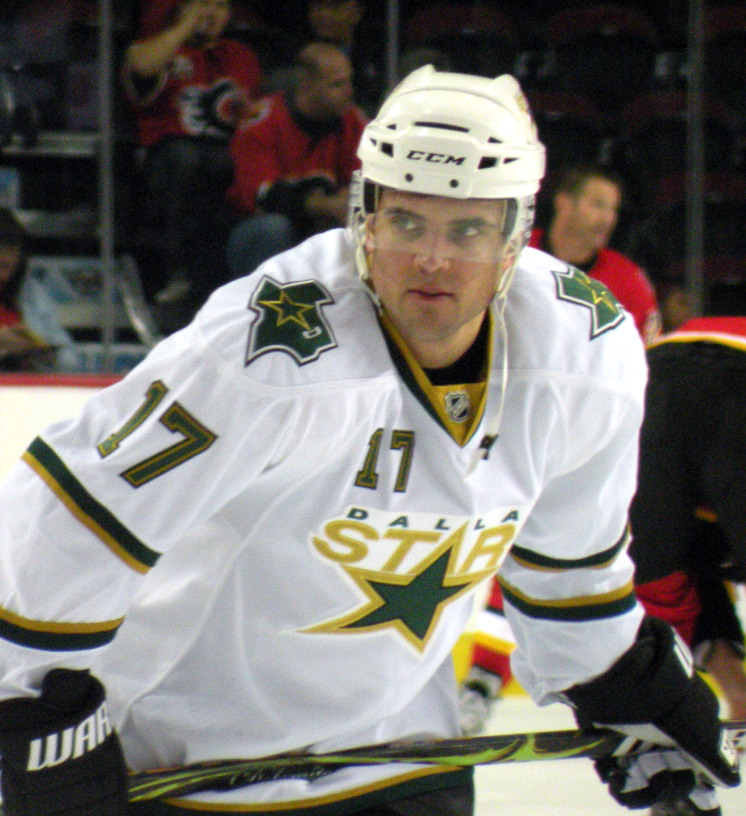
- Born: October 27, 1978 (age 47) Minneapolis, Minnesota, U.S.
- Height: 5 ft 10 in (178 cm)
- Weight: 197 lb (89 kg; 14 st 1 lb)
- Position: Right wing
- Shot: Left
- Played for: Pittsburgh Penguins; Edmonton Oilers; Dallas Stars
- Coached for: Lake Erie/Cleveland Monsters; Springfield Falcons; Colorado Avalanche; Colorado Eagles; Rochester Americans; Texas Stars
- National team: United States
- NHL draft: 244th overall, 1998; Pittsburgh Penguins
- Playing career: 2000–2014
- Coaching career: 2014–Present

Tobias Emanuel Petersen (born October 27, 1978) is an American former professional ice hockey right winger and current AHL head coach who played for the Dallas Stars of the National Hockey League (NHL). He attended Colorado College, and was drafted by the Pittsburgh Penguins 244th overall in the 9th round of the 1998 NHL entry draft.

== Playing career ==
During Game 3 of the Western Conference Final in the 2005–06 playoffs, Petersen scored his first ever NHL playoff goal against Ilya Bryzgalov of the Anaheim Ducks by stealing the puck and wrapping it into an empty net while Bryzgalov attempted to make a play behind his goal line.

In 2008 Petersen had a memorable experience at the AHL All-Star Game. The experience began the day before the game when Petersen won the 2008 AHL Skills Competition's fastest skater event with a 14.001 second lap. The experience continued during the game as Petersen recorded 3 points including scoring on the first ever penalty shot in an AHL All-Star Game.

In the 2013–14 season, his seventh within the Stars organization, Petersen helped the Texas Stars to claim their first Calder Cup and immediately announced his retirement from professional hockey.

== Coaching career ==
After the conclusion of his playing career, Petersen joined the Springfield Falcons as an assistant coach for the 2014–15 AHL season, before going to the Lake Erie/Cleveland Monsters for the 2015-16 and 2016-17 seasons. In 2015-16 he was in charge of the Lake Erie Monsters' powerplay, which converted at a 24.2% success rate and helped the Monsters win the Calder Cup. After that, he accepted another assistant coaching position with the Rochester Americans and spent the next 3 seasons with them(2017-2020).

In 2023 he accepted a position with the Colorado Avalanche of the NHL as a skills coach and spent the next two seasons with their coaching staff and hockey operations department, coaching not only the Avalanche but their AHL affiliate Colorado Eagles as well. Then, in July 2025 it was announced that Petersen would be accepting his first head coaching position with the Texas Stars.

== Personal life ==
Petersen and his wife Alexa have 2 sons. Petersen has stated that he is a type-one diabetic. As a result, he must use his insulin pump during games. The Wilkes-Barre/Scranton Penguins nominated him as their 2003–2004 AHL Man of the Year candidate for his work with Diabetes charities. He later received the award in 2013.

== Career statistics ==
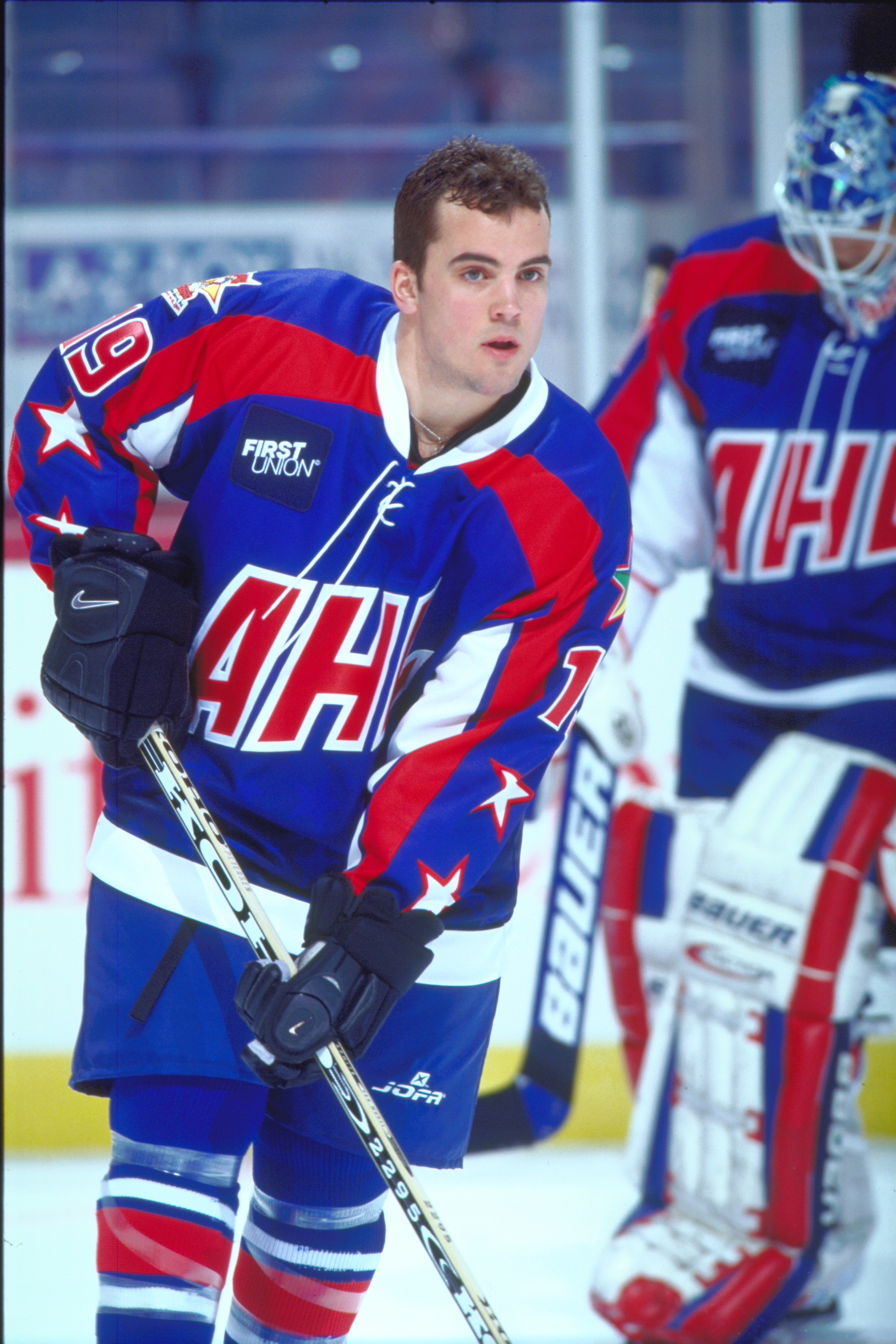
Petersen at the 2001 AHL All-Star Game.

=== Regular season and playoffs ===
| | | | Regular season | | | | | Playoffs |
| Season | Team | League | GP | G | A | Pts | PIM | GP | G | A | Pts | PIM |
|---|---|---|---|---|---|---|---|---|---|---|---|---|
| 1995–96 | Bloomington Jefferson High School | HSMN | 25 | 29 | 30 | 59 | | — | — | — | — | — |
| 1996–97 | Colorado College | WCHA | 40 | 17 | 21 | 38 | 18 | — | — | — | — | — |
| 1997–98 | Colorado College | WCHA | 40 | 16 | 17 | 33 | 34 | — | — | — | — | — |
| 1998–99 | Colorado College | WCHA | 21 | 12 | 12 | 24 | 2 | — | — | — | — | — |
| 1999–2000 | Colorado College | WCHA | 37 | 14 | 19 | 33 | 8 | — | — | — | — | — |
| 2000–01 | Wilkes–Barre/Scranton Penguins | AHL | 73 | 26 | 41 | 67 | 22 | 21 | 7 | 6 | 13 | 4 |
| 2000–01 | Pittsburgh Penguins | NHL | 12 | 2 | 6 | 8 | 4 | — | — | — | — | — |
| 2001–02 | Pittsburgh Penguins | NHL | 79 | 8 | 10 | 18 | 4 | — | — | — | — | — |
| 2002–03 | Wilkes–Barre/Scranton Penguins | AHL | 80 | 31 | 35 | 66 | 24 | 6 | 1 | 3 | 4 | 4 |
| 2003–04 | Wilkes–Barre/Scranton Penguins | AHL | 62 | 15 | 29 | 44 | 4 | 21 | 2 | 10 | 12 | 1 |
| 2004–05 | Edmonton Road Runners | AHL | 78 | 14 | 15 | 29 | 21 | — | — | — | — | — |
| 2005–06 | Iowa Stars | AHL | 79 | 26 | 47 | 73 | 48 | 7 | 2 | 4 | 6 | 2 |
| 2005–06 | Edmonton Oilers | NHL | — | — | — | — | — | 2 | 1 | 0 | 1 | 0 |
| 2006–07 | Iowa Stars | AHL | 7 | 2 | 6 | 8 | 0 | — | — | — | — | — |
| 2006–07 | Edmonton Oilers | NHL | 64 | 6 | 9 | 15 | 4 | — | — | — | — | — |
| 2007–08 | Iowa Stars | AHL | 64 | 21 | 30 | 51 | 24 | — | — | — | — | — |
| 2007–08 | Dallas Stars | NHL | 8 | 0 | 3 | 3 | 4 | 16 | 0 | 0 | 0 | 2 |
| 2008–09 | Dallas Stars | NHL | 57 | 4 | 7 | 11 | 14 | — | — | — | — | — |
| 2009–10 | Dallas Stars | NHL | 78 | 9 | 6 | 15 | 6 | — | — | — | — | — |
| 2010–11 | Dallas Stars | NHL | 60 | 2 | 4 | 6 | 8 | — | — | — | — | — |
| 2010–11 | Texas Stars | AHL | 1 | 0 | 1 | 1 | 2 | — | — | — | — | — |
| 2011–12 | Dallas Stars | NHL | 39 | 2 | 3 | 5 | 6 | — | — | — | — | — |
| 2012–13 | Texas Stars | AHL | 74 | 8 | 16 | 24 | 6 | 9 | 0 | 0 | 0 | 2 |
| 2012–13 | Dallas Stars | NHL | 1 | 0 | 0 | 0 | 0 | — | — | — | — | — |
| 2013–14 | Texas Stars | AHL | 33 | 5 | 6 | 11 | 6 | 7 | 0 | 1 | 1 | 0 |
| AHL totals | | | 550 | 148 | 226 | 374 | 157 | 71 | 12 | 24 | 36 | 24 |
| NHL totals | | | 398 | 33 | 48 | 81 | 50 | 18 | 1 | 0 | 1 | 2 |

=== International ===
| Year | Team | Event | Result | GP | G | A | Pts | PIM |
|---|---|---|---|---|---|---|---|---|
| 1997 | United States | WJC | 2nd place, silver medalist(s) | 6 | 0 | 2 | 2 | 0 |
| 1998 | United States | WJC | 5th | 7 | 0 | 2 | 2 | 0 |
| 2007 | United States | WC | 5th | 7 | 2 | 1 | 3 | 4 |
| Junior totals | | | | 13 | 0 | 4 | 4 | 0 |
| Senior totals | | | | 7 | 2 | 1 | 3 | 4 |

== Awards and honours ==
| Award | Year |
|---|---|
College
| All-WCHA Rookie Team | 1997 |
| WCHA All-Tournament Team | 1997 |
AHL
| All-Star Game | 2001, 2008 |
| All-Rookie Team | 2001 |
| Calder Cup (Texas Stars) | 2014 |
