= Brad DeFauw =

American ice hockey player (born 1977)

- Born: November 10, 1977 (age 48) Edina, Minnesota, U.S.
- Height: 6 ft 2 in (188 cm)
- Weight: 220 lb (100 kg; 15 st 10 lb)
- Position: Left wing
- Shot: Left
- Played for: Carolina Hurricanes; Växjö Lakers; EV Zug; Vålerenga; IF Björklöven; Nordsjælland Cobras
- National team: United States
- NHL draft: 28th overall, 1997; Carolina Hurricanes
- Playing career: 2000–2008

Bradley Russell DeFauw (born November 10, 1977) is an American former professional ice hockey winger who played in the National Hockey League (NHL) with the Carolina Hurricanes.

== Playing career ==
DeFauw was drafted in the second round, 28th overall, by the Carolina Hurricanes in the 1997 NHL entry draft. He played for EV Zug of Switzerland's Nationalliga A in the 2005–06 season.

After playing four seasons for the University of North Dakota, DeFauw made his professional debut with the Cincinnati Cyclones of the International Hockey League in the 2000–01 season. During the 2002–03 season, on March 9, 2003, DeFauw was recalled from the Lowell Lock Monsters of the AHL to the Hurricanes. The following night DeFauw made his NHL debut, making an immediate impression with scoring 2 goals and earning the first star award in a victory over the Columbus Blue Jackets. He finished the season with 3 goals in 9 games in what would be his only season in the NHL.

DeFauw pursued a European career for the past two seasons, spending the 2004–05 season with Växjö Lakers HC of Sweden's Allsvenskan league before joining EV Zug for the 2005–06 season. He only played two games for Zug before joining Nationalliga B's EHC Visp, where he played 18 games. Then he went to the Norwegian team Vålerenga Ishockey where he played 13 regular season games and 15 playoff games, helping them to win the Norwegian championship.

DeFauw joined Colorado College's coaching staff as a volunteer assistant until October 18, 2006, when he signed with IF Björklöven of Sweden's Allsvenskan. The signing was put into motion by DeFauw's former coach Joakim Fagervall, who is now the coach at IF Björklöven. He played the remainder of the 2006–07 season with IF Björklöven. In the 2007–08 season, he joined Nordsjælland Cobras of Denmark's Oddset Ligaen, but after one year, DeFauw left the team in May 2008 to complete the end of his professional career.

== Career statistics ==
=== Regular season and playoffs ===
			Regular season					Playoffs
Season	Team	League	GP	G	A	Pts	PIM	GP	G	A	Pts	PIM
1995–96	Apple Valley High	USHS	28	21	34	55	14	—	—	—	—	—
1996–97	U. of North Dakota	WCHA	37	7	6	13	39	—	—	—	—	—
1997–98	U. of North Dakota	WCHA	36	9	11	20	34	—	—	—	—	—
1998–99	U. of North Dakota	WCHA	34	11	12	23	64	—	—	—	—	—
1999–00	U. of North Dakota	WCHA	43	13	9	22	52	—	—	—	—	—
2000–01	Cincinnati Cyclones	IHL	82	20	31	51	39	4	2	0	2	8
2001–02	Lowell Lock Monsters	AHL	63	17	21	38	29	5	2	1	3	6
2002–03	Lowell Lock Monsters	AHL	61	11	12	23	48	—	—	—	—	—
2002–03	Carolina Hurricanes	NHL	9	3	0	3	2	—	—	—	—	—
2003–04	Lowell Lock Monsters	AHL	30	4	3	7	6	—	—	—	—	—
2004–05	Växjö Lakers	Allsv	41	12	19	31	36	2	0	0	0	2
2005–06	EHC Visp	NLB	18	7	10	17	36	—	—	—	—	—
2005–06	EV Zug	NLA	2	0	1	1	0	—	—	—	—	—
2005–06	Vålerenga	GET	13	7	6	13	22	—	—	—	—	—
2006–07	IF Björklöven	Allsv	35	14	6	20	22	1	0	0	0	0
2007–08	Nordsjælland Cobras	DEN	39	16	11	27	40	5	1	2	3	22
NHL totals			9	3	0	3	2	—	—	—	—	—

=== International ===
Year	Team	Event	Result	GP	G	A	Pts	PIM
2003	United States	WC	13th	6	1	1	2	4
Senior totals				6	1	1	2	4
