= Jason Blake (ice hockey) =

American ice hockey player (born 1973)

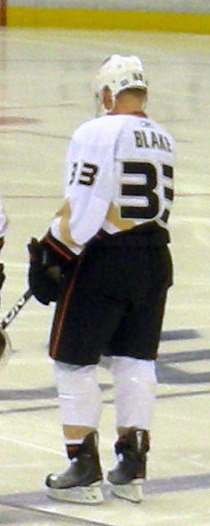
- Blake with the Anaheim Ducks in 2010
- Born: September 2, 1973 (age 53) Moorhead, Minnesota, U.S.
- Height: 5 ft 10 in (178 cm)
- Weight: 190 lb (86 kg; 13 st 8 lb)
- Position: Left wing
- Shot: Left
- Played for: Los Angeles Kings; New York Islanders; HC Lugano; Toronto Maple Leafs; Anaheim Ducks
- National team: United States
- NHL draft: Undrafted
- Playing career: 1999–2012

Jason Wayne Blake (born September 2, 1973) is an American former professional ice hockey forward who played in the National Hockey League (NHL).

== Playing career ==
=== Junior career ===
He played for the Waterloo Black Hawks of the United States Hockey League (USHL). Collegiately, he played one year at Ferris State University before transferring to the University of North Dakota (UND). He had to sit out one season due to National Collegiate Athletic Association rules. He played three seasons for UND winning league titles all three years. Blake starred on their 1996–1997 National Championship team.

=== Kings and Islanders ===
Blake went undrafted and was signed as a free agent with the Orlando Solar Bears before being signed to an NHL contract by the Los Angeles Kings in 1999. He played in 64 games in 1999–00, his first season with the Kings, scoring 5 goals and played in 3 playoff games. In 2000, Blake joined Team USA at the World Championships. In the 2000–01 season, Blake played in only 17 games with the Kings before he was acquired by the New York Islanders in a January trade, who sent a conditional pick in the 2002 NHL entry draft in return. During the 2004–05 NHL lockout, Blake signed a brief contract with the Swiss team HC Lugano. While with the Islanders Blake played the wing on a line with Alexei Yashin. In 2004, Blake was selected as part of Team USA for the World Cup of Hockey. Blake set career highs in goals and points during the 2005–06 season with 28 and 57, respectively. The following season he topped both totals, scoring 40 goals and 69 points. The 40th goal was scored against the Toronto Maple Leafs on April 5, 2007. Along with Islanders teammates Rick DiPietro and Mark Parrish, Blake was part of Team USA at the Winter Olympics held in Turin Italy in February 2006. Team USA was led by Peter Laviolette, his former coach with the Islanders. Team USA finished eighth in the tournament. Blake scored his 100th career NHL goal against the Chicago Blackhawks at the Nassau Veterans Memorial Coliseum on October 31, 2006. The milestone 100th goal came on the power play late in the 3rd period. Blake was named an all-star for the first time in his career during the 2006–07 NHL season. He recorded two assists in the 2007 NHL All-Star Game. At the end of the 2006–07 season, Blake became an unrestricted free agent. He was quoted in Newsday in February 2007 saying he would probably test the free agent market if not re-signed by the Islanders prior to the NHL trading deadline.

=== Maple Leafs ===
Blake was neither traded nor re-signed before the deadline and on July 1, 2007, Blake signed with the Toronto Maple Leafs to a five-year contract worth US$20 million. Before the season began on October 8, 2007, Blake announced that he had been diagnosed with chronic myelogenous leukemia, a rare but highly treatable form of cancer. He continued to play for the Maple Leafs for the rest of the season. In Blake's first season with Toronto, he played in all 82 regular season games while scoring 15 goals and 52 points. While he managed a considerable number of points, he struggled to score goals all season, having over 300 shots on goal, easily a career high. He was awarded the Bill Masterton Trophy at the end of the season for perseverance and dedication to hockey through the difficult times he faced after being diagnosed with cancer. However, his 2008–09 season was up and down, with a fight during practice with teammate Mikhail Grabovski making headlines and being taken out of the gameday lineup for poor play. He finished the season with 25 goals and 63 points. In the 2009–10 season, Blake struggled for the Maple Leafs, posting 10 goals and 26 points in 55 games. In 2009, Blake was selected by Team USA for his second World Championship. He was traded to the Anaheim Ducks, along with Vesa Toskala, for Jean-Sébastien Giguère on January 31, 2010.

=== Ducks and retirement ===
Blake played the entire 2010–11 season with the Ducks compiling 16 goals and 32 points in 72 games. He began the 2011–12 season playing on a line with Teemu Selanne and Saku Koivu. On October 15, 2011, Blake and the Ducks were playing the San Jose Sharks when Sharks' defenceman Brent Burns accidentally cut Blake's left arm/wrist after Blake fell down during a faceoff attempt. The cut required surgery to repair and kept Blake out of the lineup for three months. He returned to play for the Ducks in January 2012 scoring three goals in his first two games back. He finished the season with 45 games played, having scored 7 goals and 12 points. Following the season, Blake was again an unrestricted free agent. However, the season was delayed due to a lockout and Blake never signed with a team.

== Personal life ==
Blake's son, Jackson, was drafted in the fourth round, 109th overall, by the Carolina Hurricanes in the 2021 NHL entry draft. He played college ice hockey for North Dakota.

== Career statistics ==
=== Regular season and playoffs ===
			Regular season					Playoffs
Season	Team	League	GP	G	A	Pts	PIM	GP	G	A	Pts	PIM
1991–92	Moorhead High School	HS-MN	25	30	30	60	—	—	—	—	—	—
1992–93	Waterloo Black Hawks	USHL	45	24	27	51	107	—	—	—	—	—
1993–94	Waterloo Black Hawks	USHL	47	50	50	100	76	—	—	—	—	—
1994–95	Ferris State University	CCHA	36	16	16	32	46	—	—	—	—	—
1996–97	University of North Dakota	WCHA	43	19	32	51	44	—	—	—	—	—
1997–98	University of North Dakota	WCHA	38	24	27	51	62	—	—	—	—	—
1998–99	University of North Dakota	WCHA	38	28	41	69	49	—	—	—	—	—
1998–99	Orlando Solar Bears	IHL	5	3	5	8	6	13	3	4	7	20
1998–99	Los Angeles Kings	NHL	1	1	0	1	0	—	—	—	—	—
1999–00	Long Beach Ice Dogs	IHL	7	3	6	9	2	—	—	—	—	—
1999–00	Los Angeles Kings	NHL	64	5	18	23	26	3	0	0	0	0
2000–01	Lowell Lock Monsters	AHL	2	0	1	1	2	—	—	—	—	—
2000–01	Los Angeles Kings	NHL	17	1	3	4	10	—	—	—	—	—
2000–01	New York Islanders	NHL	30	4	8	12	24	—	—	—	—	—
2001–02	New York Islanders	NHL	82	8	10	18	36	7	0	1	1	13
2002–03	New York Islanders	NHL	81	25	30	55	58	5	0	1	1	2
2003–04	New York Islanders	NHL	75	22	25	47	56	4	2	0	2	2
2004–05	HC Lugano	NLA	7	2	2	4	4	—	—	—	—	—
2005–06	New York Islanders	NHL	76	28	29	57	60	—	—	—	—	—
2006–07	New York Islanders	NHL	82	40	29	69	34	5	1	2	3	2
2007–08	Toronto Maple Leafs	NHL	82	15	37	52	28	—	—	—	—	—
2008–09	Toronto Maple Leafs	NHL	78	25	38	63	40	—	—	—	—	—
2009–10	Toronto Maple Leafs	NHL	56	10	16	26	26	—	—	—	—	—
2009–10	Anaheim Ducks	NHL	26	6	9	15	10	—	—	—	—	—
2010–11	Anaheim Ducks	NHL	76	16	16	32	41	6	3	1	4	0
2011–12	Anaheim Ducks	NHL	45	7	5	12	6	—	—	—	—	—
NHL totals			871	213	273	486	455	30	6	5	11	19

=== International ===
Year	Team	Event	Result	GP	G	A	Pts	PIM
1998	United States	WC Q	Q	2	0	1	1	2
2000	United States	WC	5th	7	1	1	2	2
2004	United States	WCH	4th	4	1	0	1	2
2006	United States	OG	8th	6	0	0	0	2
2009	United States	WC	4th	9	1	3	4	4
Senior totals				26	3	4	7	10

== Awards and honors ==
Award	Year
USHL
Forward of the Year	1994
Player of the Year	1994
Dave Tyler Junior Player of the Year Award	1994
College
All-CCHA Rookie Team	1995
All-WCHA First Team	1997, 1998, 1999
AHCA West Second-Team All-American	1998
WCHA All-Tournament Team	1998
AHCA West First-Team All-American	1999
NHL
All-Star Game	2007
Bill Masterton Memorial Trophy	2008
Bob Nystrom Award	2002

Awards and achievements
Preceded by Curtis Murphy	WCHA Player of the Year; 1998–99	Succeeded by Steven Reinprecht
Preceded by Phil Kessel	Bill Masterton Memorial Trophy; 2008	Succeeded by Steve Sullivan
