= 1993–94 USHL season =

- League: United States Hockey League
- Sport: Ice hockey
- Duration: Regular season September 1993 – March 1994; Postseason; March – April 1994
- Games: 48
- Teams: 10

Regular season
- Anderson Cup: Des Moines Buccaneers

Clark Cup Playoffs
- Finals champions: Des Moines Buccaneers
- Runners-up: Omaha Lancers

USHL seasons
- ← 1992–93 1994–95 →

The 1993–94 USHL season was the 15th season of the United States Hockey League as an all-junior league. The regular season began in September 1993 and concluded in March 1994. The Des Moines Buccaneers won the Anderson Cup as regular season champions. The Des Moines Buccaneers also defeated the Omaha Lancers 3 games to 1 for the Clark Cup.

== Member changes ==
None

== Regular season ==
Final standings

Note: GP = Games played; W = Wins; L = Losses; T = Ties; OTL = Overtime losses; GF = Goals for; GA = Goals against; PTS = Points; x = clinched playoff berth; y = clinched league title

Team	GP	W	L	T	OTL	Pts	GF	GA
xy – Des Moines Buccaneers	48	36	12	0	0	72	231	150
x – Waterloo Black Hawks	48	33	13	0	2	68	214	152
x – Omaha Lancers	48	31	13	2	2	65	259	180
x – Sioux City Musketeers	48	27	14	1	6	61	209	173
x – Dubuque Fighting Saints	48	29	17	1	1	61	224	177
x – Thunder Bay Flyers	48	26	20	1	1	54	214	203
x – St. Paul Vulcans	48	20	24	0	4	44	175	183
x – Rochester Mustangs	48	20	24	0	4	43	218	252
Wisconsin Capitols	48	9	35	1	3	22	128	252
North Iowa Huskies	48	5	35	1	7	18	149	305

== Clark Cup playoffs ==
Teams were reseeded after the quarterfinal round.

Quarterfinal (Best-of-7)
1	Des Moines Buccaneers	4
8	Rochester Mustangs	0
2	Waterloo Black Hawks	2
7	St. Paul Vulcans	4
3	Omaha Lancers	4
6	Thunder Bay Flyers	2
4	Sioux City Musketeers	4
5	Dubuque Fighting Saints	2

Semifinal (Best-of-5)
1	Des Moines Buccaneers	3
7	St. Paul Vulcans	0
3	Omaha Lancers	3
4	Sioux City Musketeers	0

Championship (Best-of-5)
1	Des Moines Buccaneers	3
3	Omaha Lancers	1

Note: * denotes overtime period(s)

== Awards ==
Award	Recipient	Team
Player of the Year	Jason Blake	Waterloo Black Hawks
Forward of the Year	Jason Blake	Waterloo Black Hawks
Defenseman of the Year	Dave Dupont	Des Moines Buccaneers
Goaltender of the Year	Terry Jarkowsky	Waterloo Black Hawks
Coach of the Year	Scott Mikesch	Waterloo Black Hawks
