= 2000 CCHA men's ice hockey tournament =

Sports tournament

2000 CCHA Men's ice hockey tournament
- Dates: March 10–18, 2000
- Teams: 10
- Finals site: Joe Louis Arena; Detroit, Michigan
- Champions: Michigan State (9th title)
- Winning coach: Ron Mason (12th title)
- MVP: Ryan Miller (Michigan State)
- CCHA Men's Ice Hockey Tournaments

The 2000 CCHA Men's Ice Hockey Tournament was the 29th CCHA Men's Ice Hockey Tournament. It was played between March 10 and March 18, 2000. First round and play-in games were played at campus sites, while all 'final four' games were played at Joe Louis Arena in Detroit, Michigan. By winning the tournament, Michigan State received the Central Collegiate Hockey Association's automatic bid to the 2000 NCAA Division I Men's Ice Hockey Tournament.

== Format ==
The tournament featured three rounds of play. The two teams that finish below tenth place in the standings were not eligible for postseason play. In the quarterfinals, the first and tenth seeds, the second and ninth seeds, the third and eighth seeds, the fourth and seventh seeds and the fifth and sixth seeds played a best-of-three series, with the top three ranked winners advancing to the semifinals and two lower-seeded teams playing in a single play-in game to determine the final qualifier. In the semifinals, the remaining highest and lowest seeds and second highest and second lowest seeds play a single-game, with the winners advancing to the finals. The tournament champion receives an automatic bid to the 2000 NCAA Men's Division I Ice Hockey Tournament.

== Conference standings ==
Note: GP = Games played; W = Wins; L = Losses; T = Ties; PTS = Points; GF = Goals For; GA = Goals Against

1999–00 Central Collegiate Hockey Association standings
	Conference							Overall					
	GP	W	L	T	PTS	GF	GA	GP	W	L	T	GF	GA
#7 Michigan†	28	19	6	3	41	112	65	41	27	10	4	161	104
#10 Michigan State*	28	18	8	2	38	84	46	42	27	11	4	141	76
Lake Superior State	28	17	9	2	36	76	66	36	18	16	2	96	94
Northern Michigan	28	16	8	4	36	93	64	39	22	13	4	129	86
Notre Dame	28	11	10	7	29	65	76	42	16	18	8	103	119
Ferris State	28	13	13	2	28	85	79	39	21	16	2	127	102
Nebraska-Omaha	28	10	12	6	26	83	95	42	16	19	7	121	146
Bowling Green	28	12	15	1	25	90	88	37	17	19	1	115	114
Miami	28	10	15	3	23	75	89	36	13	20	3	99	122
Western Michigan	28	10	15	3	23	83	109	36	12	21	3	105	137
Ohio State	28	9	16	3	21	56	90	36	13	19	4	80	108
Alaska-Fairbanks	28	4	22	2	10	65	100	34	6	25	3	78	114
Championship: Michigan State † indicates conference regular season champion * indicates conference tournament champion Final rankings: USA Today/American Hockey Magazine Poll Top 15 Poll

== Bracket ==
First Round; March 10–12
1	Michigan	4	6	–
10	Western Michigan	2	2	–
2	Michigan State	6	5	–
9	Miami	2	1	–
3	Lake Superior State	1	2	–
8	Bowling Green	2*	3	–
4	Northern Michigan	2	5	1
7	Nebraska-Omaha	4	1	2
5	Notre Dame	4	1	4
6	Ferris State	3	6	2

Play-In; March 14
7	Nebraska-Omaha	3
8	Bowling Green	1

Semifinals; March 17
1	Michigan	4
7	Nebraska-Omaha	7
2	Michigan State	4
5	Notre Dame	0

Championship; March 18
7	Nebraska-Omaha	0
2	Michigan State	6

Note: * denotes overtime period(s)

=== First round ===
==== (1) Michigan vs. (10) Western Michigan ====
March 10	Michigan	4 – 2	Western Michigan	Yost Ice Arena
Josh Langfeld - 01:37; J.J. Swistak - 07:59		First period	No scoring
No scoring		Second period	No scoring
Mark Mink - GW - 02:09; Scott Matzka - 17:15		Third period	03:22 - Steve Rymsha; 05:35 - Mikeal Bishai
Josh Blackburn ( 17 saves / 19 shots )		Goalie stats	Jeff Reyneart ( 25 saves / 29 shots )

March 11	Michigan	6 – 2	Western Michigan	Yost Ice Arena
Scott Matzka - SH - 06:01; John Shouneyia - 08:58		First period	No scoring
Mike Comrie - GW - 03:25; Scott Matzka - SH - 11:58		Second period	01:44 - PP - Brent Rumble; 19:30 - Mikeal Bishai
Mike Comrie - GW - 15:11; Mark Kosick - PP - 16:03		Third period	No scoring
Josh Blackburn ( 25 saves / 27 shots )		Goalie stats	Jeff Reyneart ( 20 saves / 26 shots )

Michigan won series 2–0

==== (2) Michigan State vs. (9) Miami ====
March 10	Michigan State	3 – 2	Miami	Munn Ice Arena
Sean Patchell - PP - 11:05; Rustyn Dolyny - PP - 19:18		First period	02:32 - Craig Desjarlais
Joe Goodenow - GW - 04:11; Troy Ferguson - SH - 07:38; Damon Whitten - PP - 12:38		Second period	No scoring
Troy Ferguson - SH - 09:33		Third period	11:48 - Ernie Hartlieb; 13:17 - Matt Medevecz
Ryan Miller ( 17 saves / 19 shots )		Goalie stats	David Burleigh ( 12 saves / 17 shots ) / Andy Marsch ( 9 saves / 10 shots )

March 11	Michigan State	5 - 1	Miami	Munn Ice Arena
Troy Ferguson - PP - 07:28; Shawn Horcoff - GW PP - 13:29; Andrew Hutchinson - 19:59		First period	07:53 - Ernie Hartlieb
Rustyn Dolyny - 05:07		Second period	No scoring
Sean Patchell - 19:18		Third period	No scoring
Ryan Miller ( 20 saves / 21 shots )		Goalie stats	David Burleigh ( 11 saves / 15 shots ) / Andy Marsch ( 11 saves / 12 shots )

Michigan State won series 2–0

==== (3) Lake Superior State vs. (8) Bowling Green ====
March 10	Lake Superior State	1 – 2	OT	Bowling Green	Taffy Abel Arena
No Scoring		First period		No scoring
No scoring		Second period		No scoring
Chris McNamara - 09:21		Third period		16:26 - Mike Jones
No scoring		First overtime period		01:32 - GW - Ryan Fultz
Jayme Platt ( 35 saves / 37 shots )		Goalie stats		Tyler Masters ( 24 saves / 25 shots )

March 11	Lake Superior State	2 – 3	Bowling Green	Taffy Abel Arena
No Scoring		First period	11:28 - Ryan Murphy
Trevor Weisgerber - 02:30		Second period	12:49 - Marc Barlow
Scott Hewson - GW - 15:03		Third period	19:02 - EA - Mike Vigilante
Jayme Platt ( 24 saves / 27 shots )		Goalie stats	Tyler Masters ( 43 saves / 45 shots )

Bowling Green won series 2–0

==== (4) Northern Michigan vs. (7) Nebraska-Omaha ====
March 10	Northern Michigan	2 – 4	Nebraska-Omaha	Berry Events Center
No Scoring		First period	00:14 - James Chalmers; 08:36 - Allan Carr
Jim Jackson - PP - 06:51		Second period	No scoring
Roger Trudeau - PP - 11:04		Third period	08:11 - GW PP - Jeff Hoggan; 17:33 - James Chalmers
Dan Ragusett ( 23 saves / 27 shots )		Goalie stats	Kendall Sidoruk ( 27 saves / 29 shots )

March 11	Northern Michigan	5 – 1	Nebraska-Omaha	Berry Events Center
Chad Theuer - PP - 05:48		First period	07:12 - James Chalmers
J.P. Vigier - GW - 02:59; J.P. Vigier - 05:51; Terry Harrison - 08:17; Chris Gobert - 08:30		Second period	No scoring
No scoring		Third period	No scoring
Duane Hoey ( 21 saves / 22 shots )		Goalie stats	Kendall Sidoruk ( 7 saves / 12 shots ) / Rodney McLeod ( 10 saves / 10 shots )

March 12	Northern Michigan	1 – 2	Nebraska-Omaha	Berry Events Center
No Scoring		First period	No scoring
No scoring		Second period	00:40 - Jason White
Lee Ruff - PP - 00:48		Third period	13:29 - GW - Jeff Hoggan
Duane Hoey ( 20 saves / 22 shots )		Goalie stats	Kendall Sidoruk ( 26 saves / 27 shots )

Nebraska-Omaha won series 2–1

==== (5) Notre Dame vs. (6) Ferris State ====
March 10	Notre Dame	4 – 3	Ferris State	Joyce Center
Ryan Dolder - 00:48; Ben Simon - 18:23		First period	14:47 - Chris Kunitz
No scoring		Second period	14:35 - SH - Rob Kozak; 18:49 - Jim Dube
Andy Jurkowski - 01:11; Dan Carlson - GW - 05:46		Third period	No scoring
Tony Zasowski ( 23 saves / 26 shots )		Goalie stats	Phil Osaer ( 27 saves / 31 shots )

March 11	Notre Dame	1 – 6	Ferris State	Joyce Center
Ryan Dolder - PP - 11:12		First period	04:04 - PP - Phil Lewandowski; 08:33 - GW - Rob Collins
No scoring		Second period	00:45 - SH - Brian McCollough
No scoring		Third period	00:27 - PP - Brian McCollough; 01:59 - Chris Kunitz; 08:14 - PP - Troy Milam
Tony Zasowski ( 20 saves / 25 shots ) / Jeremiah Kimento ( 3 saves / 4 shots )		Goalie stats	Phil Osaer ( 20 saves / 21 shots )

March 12	Notre Dame	4 – 2	Ferris State	Joyce Center
Matt Van Arkel - 05:31		First period	No scoring
Jay Kopischke - 02:05; Tyson Fraser - GW - 09:56		Second period	06:46 - Jason Basile
Ryan Dolder - EN - 19:44		Third period	03:36 - Phil Lewandowski
Tony Zasowski ( 24 saves / 26 shots )		Goalie stats	Phil Osaer ( 26 saves / 29 shots )

Notre Dame won series 2–1

=== Play-in ===
==== (7) Nebraska-Omaha vs. (8) Bowling Green ====
March 14	Nebraska-Omaha	3 – 1	Bowling Green	Omaha Civic Auditorium
Jeff Hoggan - PP - 16:59		First period	14:48 - PP - Mike Jones
No scoring		Second period	No scoring
Jeff Hoggan - GW - 15:45; David Brisson - EN - 19:38		Third period	No scoring
Kendall Sidoruk ( 25 saves / 26 shots )		Goalie stats	Tyler Masters ( 39 saves / 41 shots )

=== Semifinals ===
==== (1) Michigan vs. (7) Nebraska-Omaha ====
March 17	Michigan	4 – 7	Nebraska-Omaha	Joe Louis Arena
Scott Matzka - 19:12		First period	07:18 - Dave Noel-Bernier; 13:58 - Nick Fohr
No scoring		Second period	00:11 - PP - Jeff Hoggan; 01:47 - PP - Jeff Hoggan
Sean Peach - 02:52; Mike Comrie - 17:39; Mark Kosick - EA - 19:15		Third period	00:31 - GW - James Chalmers; 17:07 - EN - David Brisson; 19:42 - EN - Dave Noel-Bernier
Josh Blackburn ( 13 saves / 18 shots )		Goalie stats	Kendall Sidoruk ( 32 saves / 36 shots )

==== (2) Michigan State vs. (5) Notre Dame ====
March 17	Michigan State	4 – 0	Notre Dame	Joe Louis Arena
Rustyn Dolyny - GW - 05:27; Shawn Horcoff - 15:05; Andrew Hutchinson - 19:49		First period	No scoring
No scoring		Second period	No scoring
Adam Hall - EN SH - 18:44		Third period	No scoring
Ryan Miller ( 20 saves / 20 shots )		Goalie stats	Tony Zasowski ( 29 saves / 32 shots )

=== Championship ===
==== (2) Michigan State vs. (7) Nebraska-Omaha ====
March 18	Michigan State	6 – 0	Nebraska-Omaha	Joe Louis Arena
No Scoring		First period	No scoring
Shawn Horcoff - GW - 04:05; Rustyn Dolyny - 07:11; Damon Whitten - 09:34; Adam Hall - PP - 16:16		Second period	No scoring
Andrew Bogle - 03:36; Brad Fast - 19:51		Third period	No scoring
Ryan Miller ( 24 saves / 24 shots )		Goalie stats	Kendall Sidoruk ( 22 saves / 28 shots )

== Tournament awards ==
=== All-Tournament Team ===
- F Rustyn Dolyny (Michigan State)
- F Jeff Hoggan (Nebraska-Omaha)
- F Shawn Horcoff (Michigan State)
- D Andrew Hutchinson (Michigan State)
- D Greg Zanon (Nebraska-Omaha)
- G Ryan Miller* (Michigan State)

* Most Valuable Player(s)
