= 2000 Hockey East men's ice hockey tournament =

2000 Hockey East Men's ice hockey tournament
- Dates: March 9–18, 2000
- Teams: 8
- Finals site: Fleet Center; Boston, Massachusetts
- Champions: Maine (4th title)
- Winning coach: Shawn Walsh (4th title)
- MVP: Niko Dimitrakos (Maine)
- Hockey East Men's Ice Hockey Tournaments

The 2000 Hockey East Men's Ice Hockey Tournament was the 16th tournament in the history of the conference. It was played between March 9 and March 18, 2000. Quarterfinal games were played at home team campus sites, while the final four games were played at the Fleet Center in Boston, Massachusetts, the home venue of the NHL's Boston Bruins. By winning the tournament, Maine received the Hockey East's automatic bid to the 2000 NCAA Division I Men's Ice Hockey Tournament.

== Format ==
The tournament featured three rounds of play. The team that finishes ninth in the conference is not eligible for tournament play. In the first round, the first and eighth seeds, the second and seventh seeds, the third seed and sixth seeds, and the fourth seed and fifth seeds played a best-of-three with the winner advancing to the semifinals. In the semifinals, the highest and lowest seeds and second highest and second lowest seeds play a single-elimination game, with the winner advancing to the championship game. The tournament champion receives an automatic bid to the 2000 NCAA Division I Men's Ice Hockey Tournament.

== Conference standings ==
Note: GP = Games played; W = Wins; L = Losses; T = Ties; PTS = Points; GF = Goals For; GA = Goals Against

1999–00 Hockey East standings
	Conference							Overall					
	GP	W	L	T	PTS	GF	GA	GP	W	L	T	GF	GA
#6 Boston University†	24	15	3	6	36	85	69	42	25	10	7	150	118
#11 New Hampshire	24	13	5	6	32	75	68	38	23	9	6	122	105
#2 Boston College	24	15	8	1	31	91	50	42	29	12	1	165	92
#3 Maine*	24	13	7	4	30	88	67	40	27	8	5	151	106
Providence	24	10	13	1	21	65	79	38	18	18	2	114	122
Northeastern	24	8	11	5	21	67	76	36	12	19	5	95	118
Merrimack	24	6	12	6	18	58	81	36	11	19	6	87	115
Massachusetts	24	5	15	4	14	50	71	36	11	20	5	86	106
Massachusetts–Lowell	24	5	16	3	13	60	78	34	9	22	3	99	112
Championship: Maine † indicates conference regular season champion * indicates conference tournament champion Final rankings: USA Today/American Hockey Magazine Poll Top 15 Poll

== Bracket ==
Quarterfinals; March 9–11
1	Boston University	4	5	—
8	Massachusetts	2	2	—
2	New Hampshire	5	3*	—
7	Merrimack	2	2	—
(Pairings are reseeded after the first round)
3	Boston College	8	3	—
6	Northeastern	4	2	—
4	Maine	5	5*	—
5	Providence	3	4	—

Semifinals; March 17
1	Boston University	2
4	Maine	4
2	New Hampshire	1
3	Boston College	2

Championship; March 18
4	Maine	2
3	Boston College	1

Note: * denotes overtime period(s)

=== Quarterfinals ===
==== (1) Boston University vs. (8) Massachusetts ====
March 10	Boston University	4 – 2	Massachusetts	Walter Brown Arena
Jack Baker - PP - 04:05		First period	No scoring
No scoring		Second period	02:53 - SH - Joe Culgin
Carl Corazzini - PP - 00:17; Jack Baker - 01:23; John Sabo - SH - 09:43		Third period	01:23 - Jeff Blanchard
Rick DiPietro ( 13 saves / 15 shots )		Goalie stats	Markus Helanen ( 38 saves / 42 shots )

March 11	Boston University	5 – 2	Massachusetts	Walter Brown Arena
No Scoring		First period	18:56 - Darcy King
Jack Baker - 04:24; Tommi Degerman - 07:55		Second period	02:49 - Jeff Blanchard
Tommi Degerman - GW - 07:15; John Sabo - 07:48; Pat Aufiero - PP - 13:44		Third period	19:45 - EA - Kris Porter
Rick DiPietro ( 24 saves / 26 shots )		Goalie stats	Markus Helanen ( 21 saves / 26 shots )

Boston University won series 2–0

==== (2) New Hampshire vs. (7) Merrimack ====
March 9	New Hampshire	5 – 2	Merrimack	Whittemore Center
No Scoring		First period	No scoring
Joshua Prudden - 10:07; Patrick Foley - 11:39		Second period	14:31 - Vincent Clevenger; 14:59 - Stephen Moon
Mike Souza - GW - 10:52; Jim Abbott - 11:06; Tim Walsh - 17:08		Third period	No scoring
Ty Conklin ( 22 saves / 24 shots )		Goalie stats	Cris Classen ( 28 saves / 33 shots )

March 10	New Hampshire	3 – 2	OT	Merrimack	Whittemore Center
No Scoring		First period		11:47 - Greg Classen
Ryan Cordeiro - 03:02		Second period		18:19 - Sandy Cohen
Garrett Stafford - 07:53		Third period		No scoring
Mike Souza - GW - 07:40		First overtime period		No scoring
Ty Conklin ( 29 saves / 31 shots )		Goalie stats		Tom Welby ( 47 saves / 50 shots )

New Hampshire won series 2–0

==== (3) Boston College vs. (6) Northeastern ====
March 10	Boston College	8 – 4	Northeastern	Conte Forum
Jeff Farkas - PP - 12:17; Jeff Farkas - 13:40		First period	12:39 - Matt Keating; 16:18 - Brian Cummings
Brian Gionta - 06:40; Ales Dolinar - 07:48		Second period	19:24 - PP - Graig Mischler
Mark McLennan - GW - 02:46; Mike Lephart - 03:19; Krys Kolanos - PP - 12:30; Brian Gionta - 17:05		Third period	14:47 - PP - Matt Keating
Scott Clemmensen ( 24 saves / 28 shots )		Goalie stats	Mike Gilhooly ( 26 saves / 34 shots )

March 11	Boston College	3 – 2	Northeastern	Conte Forum
Mike Mottau - PP - 05:32		First period	No scoring
Blake Bellefeuille - 18:06		Second period	07:38 - PP - Graig Mischler
Krys Kolanos - GW - 10:34		Third period	03:44 - Matt Keating
Scott Clemmensen ( 25 saves / 27 shots )		Goalie stats	Jason Braun ( 32 saves / 34 shots )

Boston College won series 2–0

==== (4) Maine vs. (5) Providence ====
March 9	Maine	5 – 3	Providence	Alfond Arena
Jim Leger - 03:33		First period	13:28 - Matt Libby
Niko Dimitrakos - PP - 05:58; Ben Guite - 09:02; Ben Guite - GW PP - 13:53		Second period	15:57 - Fernando Pisani; 16:49 - John DiSalvatore
Brendan Walsh - EN PP - 19:40		Third period	No scoring
Matt Yeats ( 26 saves / 29 shots )		Goalie stats	Boyd Ballard ( 34 saves / 38 shots )

March 10	Maine	5 – 4	OT	Providence	Alfond Arena
Tom Reimann - 17:33		First period		07:18 - Devin Rask; 08:46 - PP - Heath Gordon
Peter Metcalf - 10:27		Second period		04:08 - Nick Lent; 16:15 - Peter Fregoe
Chris Heisten - 07:47; Lucas Lawson - 12:29		Third period		No scoring
Brendan Walsh - GW - 11:48		First overtime period		No scoring
Matt Yeats ( 35 saves / 39 shots )		Goalie stats		Boyd Ballard ( 39 saves / 44 shots )

Maine won series 2–0

=== Semifinals ===
==== (1) Boston University vs. (4) Maine ====
March 17	Boston University	2 – 4	Maine	Fleet Center
Carl Corazzini - 08:10		First period	02:15 - Robert Ek; 05:40 - Chris Heisten
No scoring		Second period	14:16 - PP - Ben Guite; 16:20 - Niko Dimitrakos
Carl Corazzini - EA PP - 17:55		Third period	No scoring
Rick DiPietro ( 25 saves / 29 shots )		Goalie stats	Matt Yeats ( 36 saves / 38 shots )

==== (2) New Hampshire vs. (3) Boston College ====
March 17	New Hampshire	1 – 2	Boston College	Fleet Center
No Scoring		First period	No scoring
Lanny Gare - 17:33		Second period	No scoring
No scoring		Third period	12:26 - Blake Bellefeuille; 15:53 - GW - Mike Lephart
Ty Conklin ( 26 saves / 28 shots )		Goalie stats	Scott Clemmensen ( 20 saves / 21 shots )

=== Championship ===
==== (3) Boston College vs. (4) Maine ====
March 18	Boston College	1 – 2	Maine	Fleet Center
No Scoring		First period	No scoring
No scoring		Second period	No scoring
Bobby Allen - EA - 19:20		Third period	03:11 - Cory Larose; 19:57 - GW - Niko Dimitrakos
Matt Yeats ( 34 saves / 35 shots )		Goalie stats	Scott Clemmensen ( 33 saves / 35 shots )

== Tournament awards ==
=== All-Tournament Team ===
- F Blake Bellefeuille (Boston College)
- F Niko Dimitrakos* (Maine)
- F Cory Larose (Maine)
- D Robert Ek (Maine)
- D Mike Mottau (Boston College)
- G Matt Yeats (Maine)

* Tournament MVP(s)
