= Mischler =

Mischler may refer to:

- Mischler Financial Group, American investment bank and institutional brokerage
- Baptiste Mischler (born 1997), French middle-distance runner
- Martial Mischler (born 1964), French wrestler
- Norman Mischler (1920–2009), English first-class cricketer and British Indian Army officer
- Graig Mischler (born 1978), American hockey player; see 2000 Hockey East Men's Ice Hockey Tournament

== See also ==
- Mischer (disambiguation)
