= Brian Fahey =

Brian Fahey may refer to:

- Brian Fahey (composer) (1919–2007), British musical director and arranger
- Brian Fahey (ice hockey) (born 1981), American ice hockey player
