= Misharin =

Misharin is a surname. Notable people with the surname include:

- Aleksandr Misharin (screenwriter) (1939—2008), Soviet-Russian screenwriter, playwright, novelist, actor, and editor
- Alexander Misharin (born 1959), Russian politician
- Georgi Misharin (born 1985), Russian ice hockey player
- Yevgeny Misharin (born 1990), Russian futsal player

== See also ==
- Mishar (disambiguation)
