= Mischer =

Mischer may refer to:

- Don Mischer (1940–2025), American television director and producer
- Mischer Neuroscience Institute, in Texas, United States

== See also ==
- Misher (disambiguation)
- Mishar (disambiguation)
- Mischler (disambiguation)
