= Mike Mottau =

American ice hockey player

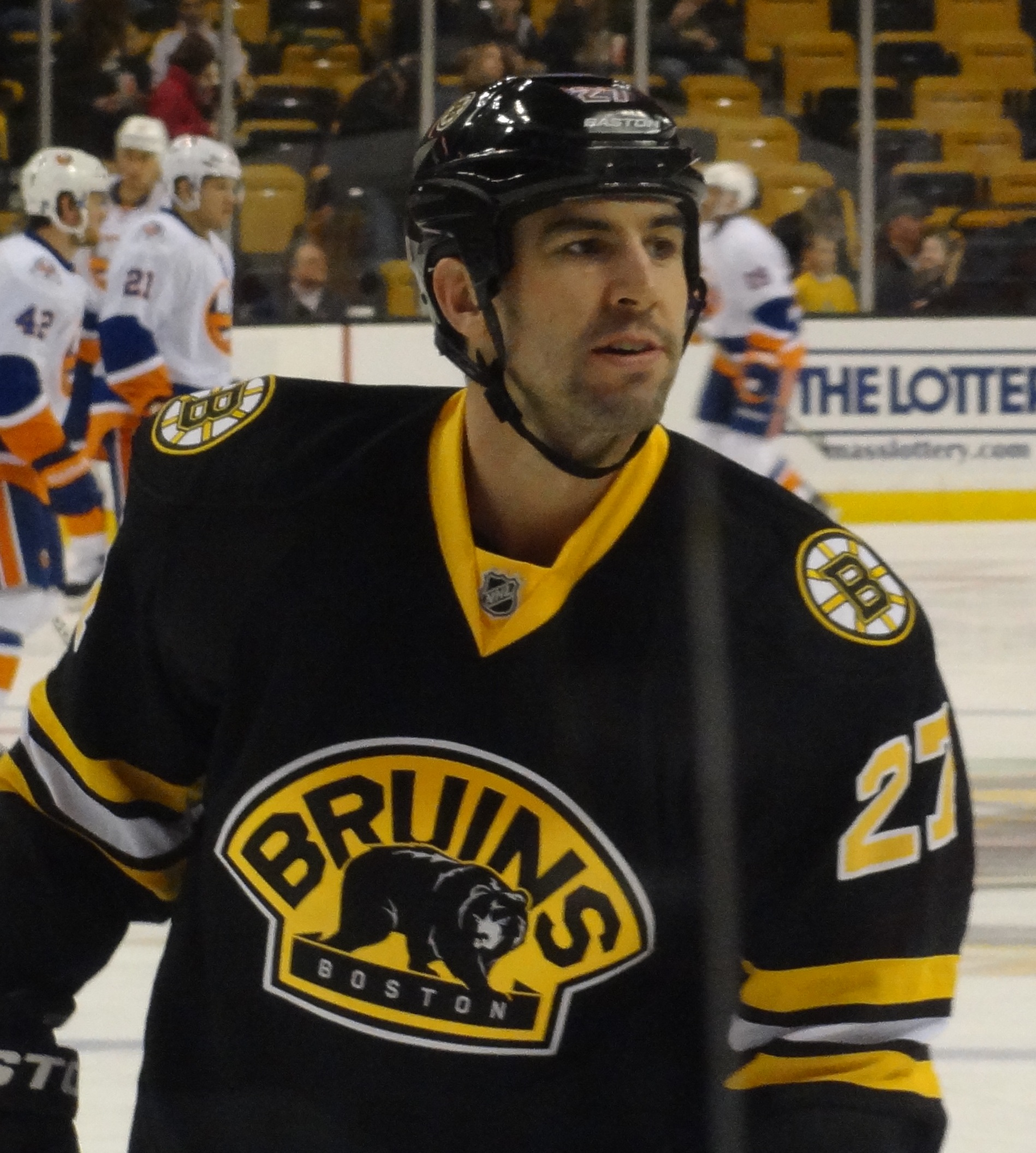
- Born: March 19, 1978 (age 48) Boston, Massachusetts, U.S.
- Height: 6 ft 1 in (185 cm)
- Weight: 193 lb (88 kg; 13 st 11 lb)
- Position: Defense
- Shot: Left
- Played for: New York Rangers; Calgary Flames; New Jersey Devils; New York Islanders; Boston Bruins; Florida Panthers
- National team: United States
- NHL draft: 182nd overall, 1997; New York Rangers
- Playing career: 2000–2014

Michael Joseph Mottau (born March 19, 1978) is an American former professional ice hockey defenseman who played in the National Hockey League (NHL). He was drafted in the seventh round, 182nd overall, by the New York Rangers in the 1997 NHL entry draft.

== Playing career ==
Mottau was born in Boston, Massachusetts, but grew up in Avon, Massachusetts.

Mottau played four years of college hockey at Boston College, and was the recipient of the Hobey Baker Award for top men's collegiate hockey player during his senior season. He made his National Hockey League debut with the Rangers during the 2000–01 season. He played nineteen games with the Rangers over two seasons, and four with the Calgary Flames during the 2002–03 season. Mottau played four seasons in the American Hockey League before returning to the NHL in the 2007–08 season with the New Jersey Devils. On September 28, 2010, Mottau signed a two-year deal with the New York Islanders.

On February 27, 2012, Mottau was traded with Brian Rolston to the Boston Bruins in exchange for Yannick Riendeau and Marc Cantin.

With the 2012–13 NHL lockout negating his chance of an NHL contract, Mottau was signed to a professional try-out deal with the San Antonio Rampage of the AHL on December 7, 2012. Mottau produced 7 assists in 16 games before he was released at the conclusion of the lockout to sign a one-year contract with the Toronto Maple Leafs on January 13, 2013.

On July 5, 2013 the Florida Panthers Executive VP & General Manager Dale Tallon announced that the club has agreed to terms with D Mike Mottau on a one-year, two way contract.

On August 19, 2014, Mottau announced his retirement. Following his retirement, Mottau has worked as a Business Development Manager for Sunrise Erectors. Guitarist Eddie Mottau is his uncle.

== Career statistics ==
=== Regular season and playoffs ===
			Regular season					Playoffs
Season	Team	League	GP	G	A	Pts	PIM	GP	G	A	Pts	PIM
1994–95	Thayer Academy	HS-Prep	29	7	19	26	—	—	—	—	—	—
1995–96	Thayer Academy	HS-Prep	31	6	20	26	14	—	—	—	—	—
1996–97	Boston College	HE	38	5	18	23	77	—	—	—	—	—
1997–98	Boston College	HE	40	13	36	49	50	—	—	—	—	—
1998–99	Boston College	HE	43	3	39	42	44	—	—	—	—	—
1999–00	Boston College	HE	42	6	37	43	57	—	—	—	—	—
2000–01	Hartford Wolf Pack	AHL	61	10	33	43	45	5	0	1	1	19
2000–01	New York Rangers	NHL	18	0	3	3	13	—	—	—	—	—
2001–02	Hartford Wolf Pack	AHL	80	9	42	51	56	10	0	5	5	4
2001–02	New York Rangers	NHL	1	0	0	0	0	—	—	—	—	—
2002–03	Hartford Wolf Pack	AHL	29	1	18	19	24	—	—	—	—	—
2002–03	Saint John Flames	AHL	32	5	12	17	14	—	—	—	—	—
2002–03	Calgary Flames	NHL	4	0	0	0	0	—	—	—	—	—
2003–04	Cincinnati Mighty Ducks	AHL	69	9	22	31	79	9	1	2	3	8
2004–05	Worcester IceCats	AHL	73	4	31	35	23	—	—	—	—	—
2005–06	Peoria Rivermen	AHL	76	8	48	56	81	4	0	1	1	6
2006–07	Lowell Devils	AHL	43	1	26	27	33	—	—	—	—	—
2007–08	New Jersey Devils	NHL	76	4	13	17	48	5	1	0	1	0
2008–09	New Jersey Devils	NHL	80	1	14	15	35	7	1	1	2	0
2009–10	New Jersey Devils	NHL	79	2	16	18	41	5	0	1	1	0
2010–11	New York Islanders	NHL	20	0	3	3	8	—	—	—	—	—
2011–12	New York Islanders	NHL	29	0	2	2	15	—	—	—	—	—
2011–12	Boston Bruins	NHL	6	0	0	0	0	2	0	0	0	0
2012–13	San Antonio Rampage	AHL	16	0	7	7	6	—	—	—	—	—
2012–13	Toronto Marlies	AHL	18	0	7	7	8	7	0	1	1	4
2013–14	San Antonio Rampage	AHL	29	1	9	10	26	—	—	—	—	—
2013–14	Florida Panthers	NHL	8	0	0	0	4	—	—	—	—	—
AHL totals			526	48	255	303	395	35	1	10	11	41
NHL totals			321	7	51	58	164	19	2	2	4	0

=== International ===
Year	Team	Event	Result	GP	G	A	Pts	PIM
1998	United States	WJC	5th	7	2	2	4	4
1999	United States	WC	6th	3	2	1	3	0
2000	United States	WC	5th	7	0	1	1	0
2003	United States	WC	13th	6	0	1	1	0
Junior totals				7	2	2	4	4
Senior totals				16	2	3	5	0

== Awards and honors ==
Award	Year
College
All-Hockey East Rookie Team	1996–97
All-Hockey East First Team	1997–98, 1999–00
AHCA East Second-Team All-American	1997–98
Hockey East All-Tournament Team	1998, 2000
All-NCAA All-Tournament Team	1998, 2000
All-Hockey East Second Team	1998–99
AHCA East First-Team All-American	1999, 2000
Walter Brown Award	1999
HE Best Defensive Defenseman	2000
HE Player of the Year	2000
Hobey Baker Award	2000
AHL
All-Rookie Team	2001
All-Star	2001, 2002, 2006

Awards and achievements
Preceded by Jason Krog	Hockey East Player of the Year; 1999–00; Shared With; Ty Conklin	Succeeded by Brian Gionta
Preceded by Steve O'Brien	Hockey East Best Defensive Defenseman; 1999–00	Succeeded by Bobby Allen
Preceded by Jason Krog	Winner of the Hobey Baker Award; 1999–00	Succeeded by Ryan Miller
