= Blake Bellefeuille =

American ice hockey player

- Born: December 27, 1977 (age 48) Framingham, Massachusetts, U.S.
- Height: 5 ft 10 in (178 cm)
- Weight: 215 lb (98 kg; 15 st 5 lb)
- Position: Center
- Shot: Right
- Played for: Columbus Blue Jackets
- NHL draft: Undrafted
- Playing career: 2000–2008

Blake Andre Bellefeuille (born December 27, 1977) is an American former professional ice hockey center who played in five National Hockey League (NHL) games over parts of two seasons (2001–02 and 2002–03) with the Columbus Blue Jackets, recording one assist. As a youth, he played in the 1991 Quebec International Pee-Wee Hockey Tournament with the Boston Bruins minor ice hockey team. His niece, Grace Bellefeuille, also played hockey.

== Career statistics ==
=== Regular season and playoffs ===
			Regular season					Playoffs
Season	Team	League	GP	G	A	Pts	PIM	GP	G	A	Pts	PIM
1994–95	Framingham High	USHS	30	42	50	92	12	—	—	—	—	—
1995–96	Framingham High	USHS	30	31	60	91	18	—	—	—	—	—
1996–97	Boston College	HE	34	16	19	35	20	—	—	—	—	—
1997–98	Boston College	HE	41	19	20	39	35	—	—	—	—	—
1998–99	Boston College	HE	43	24	25	49	80	—	—	—	—	—
1999–00	Boston College	HE	41	19	32	51	30	—	—	—	—	—
2000–01	Syracuse Crunch	AHL	50	5	5	10	18	5	0	0	0	0
2001–02	Syracuse Crunch	AHL	75	11	19	30	33	4	2	0	2	0
2001–02	Columbus Blue Jackets	NHL	2	0	1	1	0	—	—	—	—	—
2002–03	Syracuse Crunch	AHL	63	12	19	31	44	—	—	—	—	—
2002–03	Columbus Blue Jackets	NHL	3	0	0	0	0	—	—	—	—	—
2003–04	Providence Bruins	AHL	7	1	0	1	2	—	—	—	—	—
2003–04	Norfolk Admirals	AHL	59	4	8	12	17	5	1	1	2	0
2004–05	Danbury Trashers	UHL	44	16	14	30	14	—	—	—	—	—
2004–05	Bridgeport Sound Tigers	AHL	1	0	0	0	0	—	—	—	—	—
2005–06	Charlotte Checkers	ECHL	25	7	10	17	21	1	0	2	2	0
2005–06	Hartford Wolf Pack	AHL	5	1	1	2	4	—	—	—	—	—
2005–06	Philadelphia Phantoms	AHL	22	0	3	3	20	—	—	—	—	—
2006–07	Charlotte Checkers	ECHL	68	29	35	64	45	5	2	0	2	0
2007–08	Charlotte Checkers	ECHL	60	23	24	47	27	3	0	0	0	2
NHL totals			5	0	1	1	0	—	—	—	—	—

Medal record

Representing United States

Ice hockey

World Junior Championships
Silver medal – second place	1997 Switzerland	

=== International ===
Year	Team	Event	Result	GP	G	A	Pts	PIM
1997	United States	WJC	2nd place, silver medalist(s)	6	0	1	1	2
Junior totals				6	0	1	1	2

== Awards and honors ==
Award	Year
College
Hockey East All-Tournament Team	1999, 2000
All-Hockey East Second Team	1999–00

Awards and achievements
Preceded by Marty Reasoner	William Flynn Tournament Most Valuable Player; 1999	Succeeded by Niko Dimitrakos
