= Niko Dimitrakos =

Greek-American ice hockey player

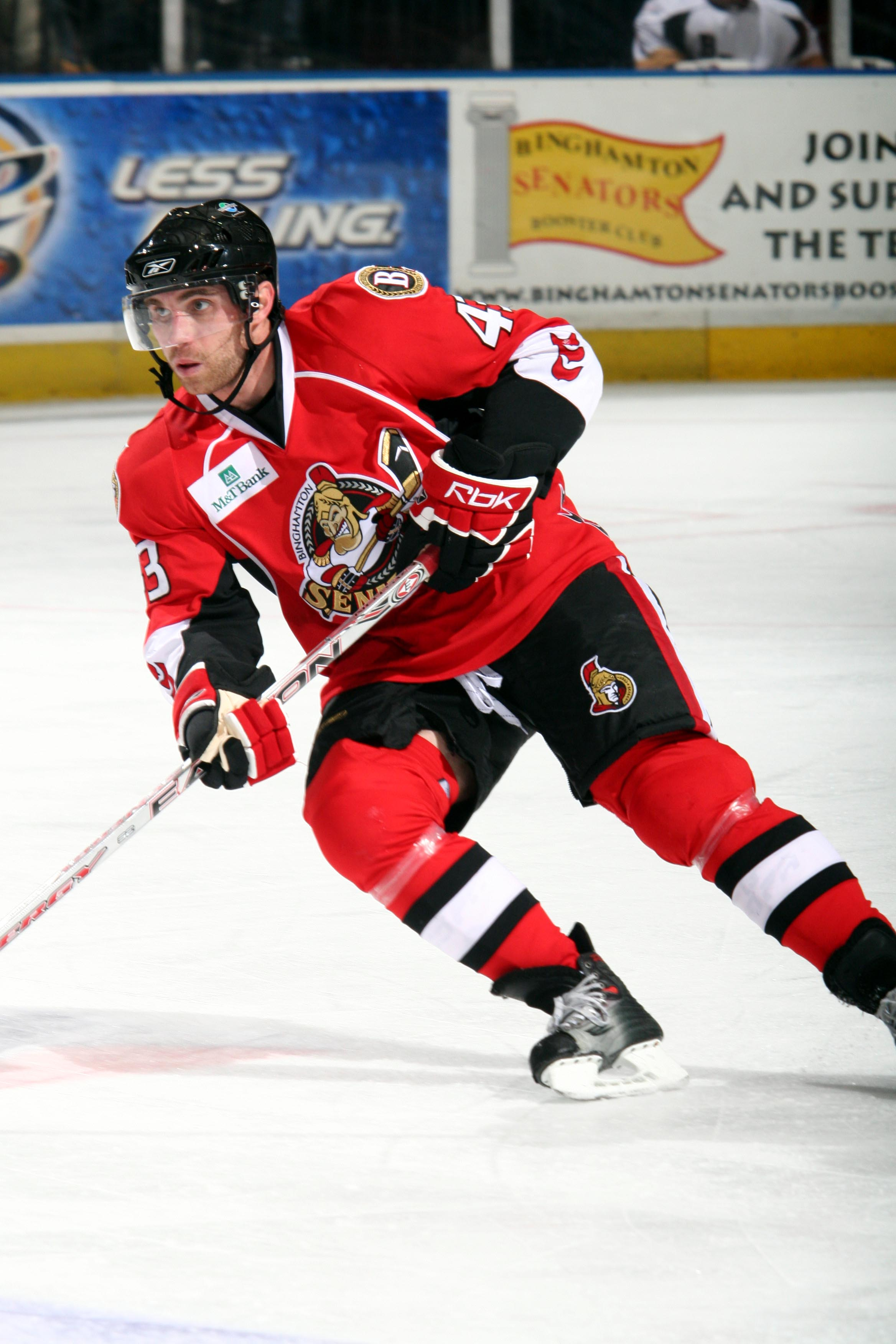
- Dimitrakos with the Binghamton Senators in 2007
- Born: May 21, 1979 (age 46) Somerville, Massachusetts, U.S.
- Height: 5 ft 10 in (178 cm)
- Weight: 195 lb (88 kg; 13 st 13 lb)
- Position: Right wing
- Shot: Right
- Played for: San Jose Sharks; SCL Tigers; Philadelphia Flyers; Skellefteå AIK; CSKA Moscow; Modo Hockey; Adler Mannheim; Grizzly Adams Wolfsburg; Ilves
- National team: United States
- NHL draft: 155th overall, 1999; San Jose Sharks
- Playing career: 2002–2014

Nicholas Dimitrakos (Greek: Νίκο Δημητράκος; born May 21, 1979) is a Greek-American former professional ice hockey right winger who played in the National Hockey League (NHL) with the San Jose Sharks and Philadelphia Flyers.

== Playing career ==
Dimitrakos was first introduced to hockey at age four by his uncle, and has loved and played it ever since. As a youth, he played in the 1993 Quebec International Pee-Wee Hockey Tournament with a minor ice hockey team from Beverly, Massachusetts. He graduated from Matignon High School (Cambridge, MA) in 1997. After graduation, Niko took a year's postgraduate course at Avon Old Farms (Avon, CT), a prestigious hockey prep school.

Dimitrakos played his college hockey for the University of Maine Black Bears, helping the team win the 1999 NCAA Championship, and making the 1999 NCAA Championship All-Tournament Team. In his senior year, Dimitrakos led the team in points, with 20 goals and 31 assists in 43 games. While still a UMaine Black Bear, he was drafted by the San Jose Sharks, in the 5th round (155th overall) of the 1999 NHL entry draft.

Dimitrakos received his first NHL action toward the end of the 2002–03 NHL season. Sometimes playing on the same line as NHL star Teemu Selänne, he was credited with 6 goals and 7 assists in 21 games as a rookie. The following year, he logged 9 goals and 15 assists in 68 games. Despite his modest regular season statistics, he played well in the 2004 NHL playoffs, winning the first game of the first round against St. Louis with an overtime goal and subsequently helping San Jose advance to the Western Conference finals for the first time in franchise history.

2005–06 was a bit of a disappointing season for Dimitrakos, however, and on March 9, 2006, he was traded by the Sharks to the Philadelphia Flyers in exchange for a draft pick. He played in 24 games for the Flyers before being demoted to their AHL affiliate, the Philadelphia Phantoms, in October 2006. Following the 2006–07 season, Dimitrakos signed a one-year contract with the Ottawa Senators.

Prior to the 2008–09 season, Dimitrakos signed a one-year contract with Skellefteå in Sweden. Because of his Greek citizenship, he is not counted against the non-EU player limit.

In September 2011, he returned to play in North America - signing a PTO (Professional Tryout) contract with the Vancouver Canucks and attending their training camp. Dimitrakos was later released by the Vancouver Canucks on September 25, 2011. On October 5, 2011, Dimitrakos agreed to a 25-game PTO contract with the Wilkes-Barre/Scranton Penguins to start the 2011–12 season. After 21 games with Wilkes-Barre, Dimitrakos declined an extension to remain in the AHL and returned to his previous team in the DEL, Adler Mannheim, for the remainder of the 2011–12 season.

After contributing to Mannheim's offense to end the year, Dimitrakos signed on a one-year contract with rival DEL team Grizzly Adams Wolfsburg on July 18, 2012.

In January 2014, Dimitrakos signed a contract for the rest of the 2013–14 season with Finnish club, Ilves. He contributed with 7 points in 9 games before opting to retire from professional hockey after 12 seasons.

== International play ==
Dimitrakos represent United States at the 2003 Men's World Ice Hockey Championships.

== Career statistics ==
=== Regular season and playoffs ===
			Regular season					Playoffs
Season	Team	League	GP	G	A	Pts	PIM	GP	G	A	Pts	PIM
1998–99	University of Maine	HE	35	8	19	27	33	—	—	—	—	—
1999–00	University of Maine	HE	32	11	16	27	16	—	—	—	—	—
2000–01	University of Maine	HE	29	11	14	25	43	—	—	—	—	—
2001–02	University of Maine	HE	43	20	31	51	44	—	—	—	—	—
2002–03	Cleveland Barons	AHL	55	15	29	44	30	—	—	—	—	—
2002–03	San Jose Sharks	NHL	21	6	7	13	8	—	—	—	—	—
2003–04	Cleveland Barons	AHL	7	4	4	8	4	—	—	—	—	—
2003–04	San Jose Sharks	NHL	68	9	15	24	49	15	1	8	9	8
2004–05	SCL Tigers	NLA	3	0	1	1	0	6	3	3	6	16
2005–06	San Jose Sharks	NHL	45	4	12	16	26	—	—	—	—	—
2005–06	Philadelphia Flyers	NHL	19	5	4	9	6	5	0	0	0	2
2006–07	Philadelphia Flyers	NHL	5	0	0	0	6	—	—	—	—	—
2006–07	Philadelphia Phantoms	AHL	45	15	13	28	34	—	—	—	—	—
2006–07	Chicago Wolves	AHL	17	4	10	14	20	15	3	7	10	8
2007–08	Binghamton Senators	AHL	64	20	20	40	67	—	—	—	—	—
2008–09	Skellefteå AIK	SEL	54	22	22	44	59	1	0	0	0	0
2009–10	CSKA Moscow	KHL	50	12	5	17	32	3	0	0	0	12
2010–11	Modo Hockey	SEL	22	4	1	5	22	—	—	—	—	—
2010–11	Adler Mannheim	DEL	20	7	8	15	14	6	3	3	6	2
2011–12	Wilkes-Barre/Scranton Penguins	AHL	21	6	4	10	20	—	—	—	—	—
2011–12	Adler Mannheim	DEL	20	5	9	14	40	4	0	1	1	2
2012–13	Grizzly Adams Wolfsburg	DEL	13	4	7	11	8	—	—	—	—	—
2013–14	Ilves	Liiga	9	2	5	7	31	—	—	—	—	—
NHL totals			158	24	38	62	95	20	1	8	9	10
KHL totals			50	12	5	17	32	3	0	0	0	12

=== International ===
Year	Team	Event	Result	GP	G	A	Pts	PIM
2003	United States	WC	13th	6	0	1	1	6
Senior totals				6	0	1	1	6

== Awards and honors ==
Award	Year
College
All-NCAA All-Tournament Team	1999
NCAA National Champion (Maine)	1999
Hockey East All-Tournament Team	2000
All-Hockey East Second team	2001–02
AHCA East Second-Team All-American	2001–02
AHL
All-Star Game	2003

Awards and achievements
Preceded by Blake Bellefeuille	William Flynn Tournament Most Valuable Player; 2000	Succeeded by Chuck Kobasew
