= Misar =

Misar may refer to:

- Mişär dialect (or Mishar dialect), , a dialect of the Tatar language
- Mişärs (or Mishars), an ethnic group of Tatars
- Mišar, Serbia
- Misar, Iran

== See also ==
- Mishar (disambiguation)
