= Misher =

Mischer may refer to:

- Misher dialect, a variety of Tatar
- Misher Tatars, an ethnic group of Russia
- Kevin Misher, American producer

== See also ==
- Meshchera, a historic group of Volga Finns
- Mischer (disambiguation)
