= 1999–2000 NCAA Division I men's ice hockey season =

1999–00 NCAA Division I men's ice hockey season
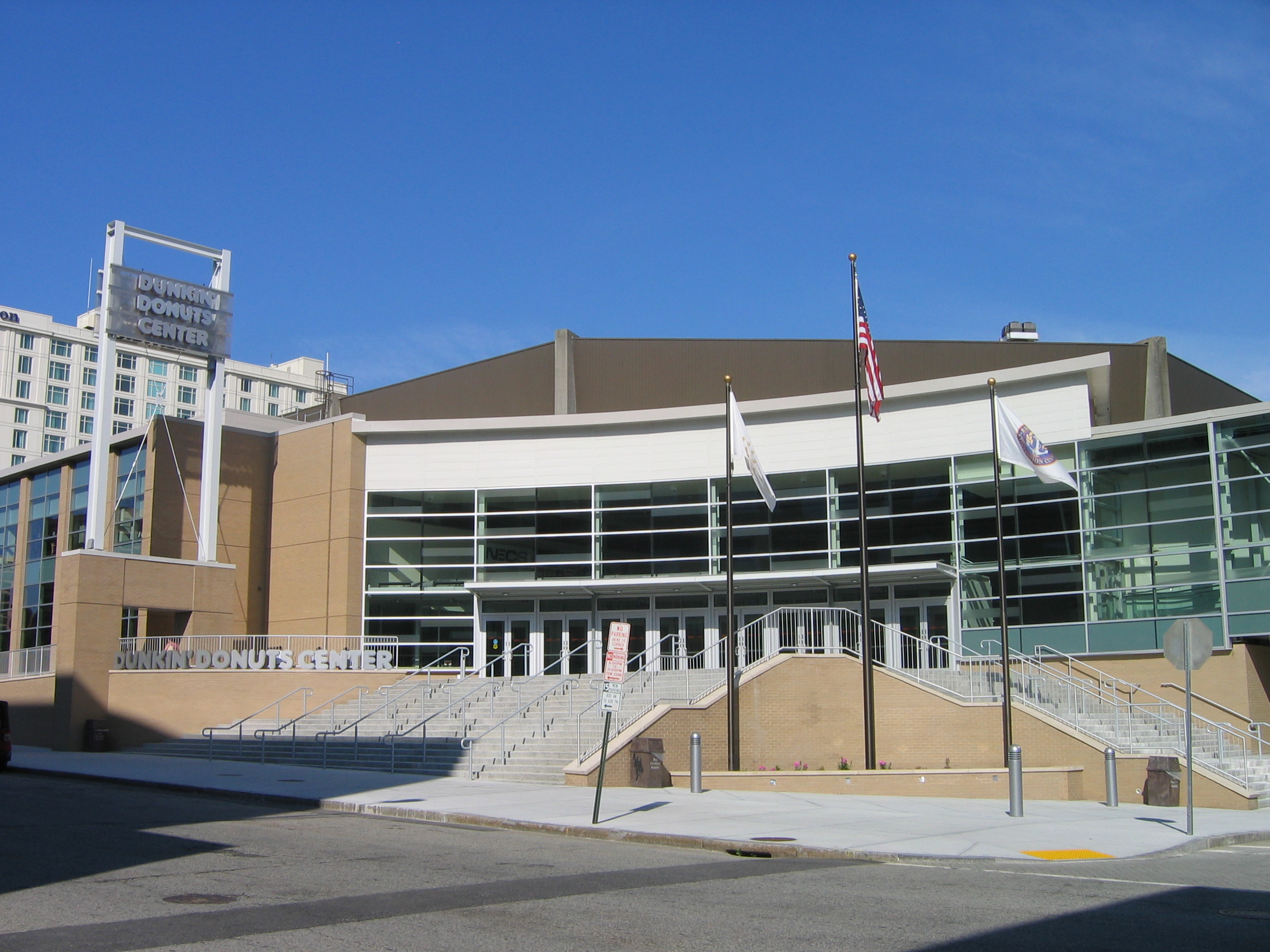
- The Providence Civic Center in Providence, Rhode Island, hosted the 2000 Frozen Four
- Duration: October 1, 1999– April 8, 2000
- NCAA tournament: 2000
- National championship: Providence Civic Center; Providence, Rhode Island
- NCAA champion: North Dakota
- Hobey Baker Award: Mike Mottau (Boston College)

The 1999–2000 NCAA Division I men's ice hockey season began on October 1, 1999, and concluded with the 2000 NCAA Division I Men's Ice Hockey Tournament's championship game on April 8, 2000, at the Providence Civic Center in Providence, Rhode Island. This was the 53rd season in which an NCAA ice hockey championship was held and is the 106th year overall where an NCAA school fielded a team.

The 1999–2000 season was the inaugural year for College Hockey America, a seven-team conference (Wayne State begins conference play the following year) that was created for the purpose of stabilizing all the remaining independent Division I ice hockey teams.

The University of Vermont cancelled the remainder of their season on January 14, 2000, as a result of a criminal investigation into hazing practices when it was revealed that players had lied to investigators.

== Season Outlook ==
=== Pre-season polls ===
The top teams in the nation as ranked before the start of the season.

The WMPL/D&N Bank Baker's Dozen poll was voted on by coaches. The U.S. College Hockey Online poll was voted on by coaches, media, and NHL scouts. The USA Today/American Hockey Magazine poll was voted on by coaches and media.

This was the 28th and last season for the WMPL poll.

WMPL Poll
Rank	Team
1	Boston College (7)
2	Maine
3	North Dakota (2)
4	Michigan
5	Michigan State
6	New Hampshire
7	Colorado College
8	Northern Michigan
9	Clarkson
10	Denver
11	Wisconsin
12	Rensselaer
13	Miami

USCHO Poll
Rank	Team
1	Boston College (26)
2	Maine (7)
3	Michigan State (1)
4	North Dakota (4)
5	Michigan (1)
6	New Hampshire (1)
7	Clarkson
8	Colorado College
9	Northern Michigan
10	Denver

USA Today Poll
Rank	Team
1	Boston College
2	Maine
3	Michigan State
4	New Hampshire
5	North Dakota
6	Michigan
7	Clarkson
8	Rensselaer
9	Denver
10	St. Lawrence
11	Northern Michigan
12	Colorado College
13	Wisconsin
14	Colgate
15	Miami

== Regular season ==
=== Season tournaments ===
Tournament	Dates	Teams	Champion
Johnson Nissan Tournament	October 9–10	4	Boston University
ECAC–Omni Faceoff Classic	October 15–16	4	Rensselaer
Ice Breaker Tournament	October 15–16	4	Denver
JCPenney Classic	October 22–23	4	Maine
Quinnipiac Cup	October 22–23	4	Iona
College Hockey Showcase	November 26–27	4	
Festival of Lights Holiday Tournament	November 26–27	4	Massachusetts–Lowell
Syracuse Invitational	November 27–28	4	Colgate
UNH Tournament	November 27–28	4	New Hampshire
Silverado Shootout	December 27–28	4	Ferris State
Valour Cup	December 27–28	4	Yale
Badger Showdown	December 28–29	4	North Dakota
Great Lakes Invitational	December 29–30	4	Michigan State
Mariucci Classic	December 29–30	4	Minnesota
Rensselaer Holiday Tournament	December 29–30	4	Providence
Sheraton/Howard Bank Hockey Classic	December 29–30	4	Boston College
Denver Cup	December 31–January 1	4	Maine
Beanpot	February 7, 14	4	Boston University

=== Standings ===
1999–00 Central Collegiate Hockey Association standings
	Conference							Overall					
	GP	W	L	T	PTS	GF	GA	GP	W	L	T	GF	GA
#7 Michigan†	28	19	6	3	41	112	65	41	27	10	4	161	104
#10 Michigan State*	28	18	8	2	38	84	46	42	27	11	4	141	76
Lake Superior State	28	17	9	2	36	76	66	36	18	16	2	96	94
Northern Michigan	28	16	8	4	36	93	64	39	22	13	4	129	86
Notre Dame	28	11	10	7	29	65	76	42	16	18	8	103	119
Ferris State	28	13	13	2	28	85	79	39	21	16	2	127	102
Nebraska-Omaha	28	10	12	6	26	83	95	42	16	19	7	121	146
Bowling Green	28	12	15	1	25	90	88	37	17	19	1	115	114
Miami	28	10	15	3	23	75	89	36	13	20	3	99	122
Western Michigan	28	10	15	3	23	83	109	36	12	21	3	105	137
Ohio State	28	9	16	3	21	56	90	36	13	19	4	80	108
Alaska-Fairbanks	28	4	22	2	10	65	100	34	6	25	3	78	114
Championship: Michigan State † indicates conference regular season champion * indicates conference tournament champion Final rankings: USA Today/American Hockey Magazine Poll Top 15 Poll

1999–00 College Hockey America standings
	Conference							Overall					
	GP	W	L	T	PTS	GF	GA	GP	W	L	T	GF	GA
#8 Niagara†*	17	15	0	2	32	86	18	42	30	8	4	165	65
Alabama-Huntsville	18	12	5	1	25	73	46	31	17	10	4	121	86
Bemidji State	17	8	8	1	17	63	69	34	13	20	1	107	155
Air Force	16	6	10	0	12	44	50	39	19	18	2	131	125
Findlay	18	4	14	0	8	38	101	31	9	22	0	79	146
Army	10	1	9	0	2	21	41	32	13	17	2	102	95
Championship: Niagara † indicates conference regular season champion * indicates conference tournament champion Final rankings: USA Today/American Hockey Magazine Poll Top 15 Poll

1999–00 ECAC Hockey standings
	Conference							Overall					
	GP	W	L	T	PTS	GF	GA	GP	W	L	T	GF	GA
#4 St. Lawrence†*	20	16	3	1	33	76	47	37	27	8	2	130	94
#9 Colgate	20	14	4	2	30	85	61	35	24	9	2	132	93
#13 Rensselaer	21	11	9	1	23	61	49	37	22	13	2	123	85
Cornell	20	10	9	1	21	70	54	32	16	14	2	104	86
Clarkson	20	9	8	3	21	69	71	35	17	15	3	111	116
Princeton	21	8	9	4	20	66	66	30	10	16	4	84	97
Harvard	21	9	10	2	20	65	63	30	11	17	2	85	95
Dartmouth	21	8	10	3	19	54	63	30	9	17	4	71	98
Yale	21	6	11	4	16	45	63	30	9	16	5	68	85
Union	21	6	14	1	13	48	75	33	8	24	1	79	127
Brown	21	4	15	2	10	52	78	28	6	19	3	66	98
Vermont^	7	3	2	2	8	25	26	17	5	9	3	53	75
Championship: St. Lawrence † indicates conference regular season champion * indicates conference tournament champion (Whitelaw Cup)^ Vermont was ineligible for the postseason Final rankings: USA Today/American Hockey Magazine Poll Top 15 Poll

1999–00 Hockey East standings
	Conference							Overall					
	GP	W	L	T	PTS	GF	GA	GP	W	L	T	GF	GA
#6 Boston University†	24	15	3	6	36	85	69	42	25	10	7	150	118
#11 New Hampshire	24	13	5	6	32	75	68	38	23	9	6	122	105
#2 Boston College	24	15	8	1	31	91	50	42	29	12	1	165	92
#3 Maine*	24	13	7	4	30	88	67	40	27	8	5	151	106
Providence	24	10	13	1	21	65	79	38	18	18	2	114	122
Northeastern	24	8	11	5	21	67	76	36	12	19	5	95	118
Merrimack	24	6	12	6	18	58	81	36	11	19	6	87	115
Massachusetts	24	5	15	4	14	50	71	36	11	20	5	86	106
Massachusetts–Lowell	24	5	16	3	13	60	78	34	9	22	3	99	112
Championship: Maine † indicates conference regular season champion * indicates conference tournament champion Final rankings: USA Today/American Hockey Magazine Poll Top 15 Poll

1999–2000 Division I Independent ice hockey standings
	Conference							Overall					
	GP	W	L	T	PTS	GF	GA	GP	W	L	T	GF	GA
Wayne State	0	0	0	0	-	-	-	30	12	16	2	93	104
Final rankings: USA Today/American Hockey Magazine Poll Top 15 Poll

1999–00 Metro Atlantic Athletic Conference standings
	Conference							Overall					
	GP	W	L	T	PTS	GF	GA	GP	W	L	T	GF	GA
Quinnipiac†	27	23	1	3	49	152	60	36	27	6	3	195	95
Mercyhurst	27	19	6	2	40	113	64	37	23	10	4	143	94
Canisius	27	16	8	3	35	93	79	35	21	10	4	113	95
Connecticut*	27	15	11	1	31	104	77	36	19	16	1	133	116
Sacred Heart	27	14	10	3	31	86	74	34	16	15	3	104	104
Iona	27	13	12	2	28	93	93	37	17	17	3	126	132
Holy Cross	27	8	16	3	19	83	110	35	8	24	3	98	158
Bentley	27	7	18	2	16	90	130	32	7	23	2	98	159
American International	27	5	19	3	13	72	124	30	7	20	3	83	136
Fairfield	27	3	22	2	8	69	144	34	3	28	3	78	183
Championship: Connecticut † indicates conference regular season champion * indicates conference tournament champion Final rankings: USA Today/American Hockey Magazine Poll Top 15 Poll

1999–00 Western Collegiate Hockey Association standings
	Conference							Overall					
	GP	W	L	T	PTS	GF	GA	GP	W	L	T	GF	GA
#5 Wisconsin†	28	23	5	0	46	112	70	41	31	9	1	166	109
#1 North Dakota*	28	17	6	5	39	113	61	44	31	8	5	192	97
#12 St. Cloud State	28	16	9	3	35	105	66	40	23	14	3	156	103
#15 Minnesota State-Mankato	28	15	10	3	33	90	82	39	21	14	4	126	117
Colorado College	28	14	11	3	31	88	69	39	18	18	3	126	102
#14 Minnesota	28	13	13	2	28	95	84	41	20	19	2	148	133
Alaska-Anchorage	28	11	14	3	25	65	87	36	15	18	3	85	104
Minnesota-Duluth	28	10	18	0	20	59	114	37	15	22	0	93	146
Denver	28	9	18	1	19	92	97	41	16	23	2	132	136
Michigan Tech	28	2	26	0	4	47	136	38	4	34	0	68	183
Championship: North Dakota † indicates conference regular season champion * indicates conference tournament champion Final rankings: USA Today/American Hockey Magazine Poll Top 15 Poll

=== Final regular season polls ===
The WMPL/D&N Bank poll and USA Today/American Hockey Magazine polls were released before the conference tournaments. The USCHO poll was released before the NCAA tournament.

WMPL Poll
Ranking	Team
1	Wisconsin (10)
2	Boston University
3	North Dakota
4	Michigan
5	New Hampshire
6	Maine
7	Michigan State
8	St. Lawrence
9	Boston College
10	Northern Michigan
11	Colgate
12	St. Cloud State
(tie)	Minnesota State Mankato

USA Today Poll
Ranking	Team
1	Wisconsin
2	Boston University
3	North Dakota
4	Michigan
5	New Hampshire
6	Boston College
7	Maine
8	Michigan State
9	St. Lawrence
10	Northern Michigan
11	Colgate
12	St. Cloud State
13	Niagara
14	Minnesota State Mankato
15	Ferris State

USCHO Poll
Ranking	Team
1	Wisconsin (27)
2	North Dakota (9)
3	Maine (3)
4	Boston University
5	St. Lawrence
6	Boston College
7	New Hampshire
8	Michigan State
9	Michigan
10	Colgate

== 2000 NCAA Tournament ==
First Round
1	Maine	–
–	bye	–
East Regional
4	Colgate	3
5	Michigan	4*
2	North Dakota	–
–	bye	–
West Regional
3	New Hampshire	1
6	Niagara	4
1	Wisconsin	–
–	bye	–
West Regional
4	Boston College	6*
5	Michigan State	5
2	St. Lawrence	–
–	bye	–
East Regional
3	Boston University	5
6	St. Cloud State	3

Quarterfinals
1	Maine	5
5	Michigan	2
2	North Dakota	4
6	Niagara	1
1	Wisconsin	1
4	Boston College	4
2	St. Lawrence	3****
3	Boston University	2

Frozen Four
E1	Maine	0
W2	North Dakota	2
W4	Boston College	4
E2	St. Lawrence	2

National Championship
W2	North Dakota	4
E4	Boston College	2

Note: * denotes overtime period(s)

== Player stats ==
=== Scoring leaders ===
The following players led the league in points at the conclusion of the season.

GP = Games played; G = Goals; A = Assists; Pts = Points; PIM = Penalty minutes

Player	Class	Team	GP	G	A	Pts	PIM
Steven Reinprecht	Senior	Wisconsin	37	26	40	66	14
Shawn Horcoff	Senior	Michigan State	42	14	51	65	50
Jeff Panzer	Junior	North Dakota	44	19	46	65	16
Lee Goren	Senior	North Dakota	44	34	29	63	42
Mike Comrie	Sophomore	Michigan	40	24	35	59	95
John Pohl	Sophomore	Minnesota	41	18	41	59	26
Jeff Farkas	Senior	Boston College	41	32	26	58	59
Andy McDonald	Senior	Colgate	34	24	34	58	49
Brian Gionta	Junior	Boston College	42	33	23	56	66
Dany Heatley	Freshman	Wisconsin	38	28	28	56	32
Jason Ulmer	Senior	North Dakota	44	18	38	56	33

=== Leading goaltenders ===
The following goaltenders led the league in goals against average at the end of the regular season while playing at least 33% of their team's total minutes.

GP = Games played; Min = Minutes played; W = Wins; L = Losses; OT = Overtime/shootout losses; GA = Goals against; SO = Shutouts; SV% = Save percentage; GAA = Goals against average

Player	Class	Team	GP	Min	W	L	OT	GA	SO	SV%	GAA
Greg Gardner	Senior	Niagara	41	2503	29	8	4	64	12	.936	1.53
Ryan Miller	Freshman	Michigan State	26	1524	16	5	3	39	8	.932	1.53
Joel Laing	Senior	Rensselaer	27	1611	17	7	2	49	6	.947	1.82
Karl Goehring	Junior	North Dakota	30	1747	19	6	4	55	8	.927	1.89
Tim Kelleher	Freshman	Boston College	17	918	10	5	1	31	2	.919	2.02
Derek Gustafson	Freshman	St. Lawrence	24	1434	17	4	2	50	2	.936	2.09
Phil Osaer	Sophomore	Ferris State	25	1350	13	8	2	48	3	.917	2.13
Dan Ragusett	Junior	Northern Michigan	29	1698	16	9	3	61	5	.911	2.15
Joe Blackburn	Junior	Michigan State	18	1025	11	6	1	37	1	.907	2.17
Scott Clemmensen	Junior	Boston College	28	1610	19	7	0	59	5	.914	2.20

== Awards ==
=== NCAA ===
Award		Recipient
Hobey Baker Memorial Award		Mike Mottau, Boston College
Spencer T. Penrose Award		Joe Marsh, St. Lawrence
Most Outstanding Player in NCAA Tournament		Lee Goren, North Dakota
AHCA All-American Teams
East First Team	Position	West First Team
Joel Laing, Rensselaer	G	Karl Goehring, North Dakota
Justin Harney, St. Lawrence	D	Jeff Dessner, Wisconsin
Mike Mottau, Boston College	D	Jeff Jillson, Michigan
Brian Gionta, Boston College	F	Shawn Horcoff, Michigan State
Andy McDonald, Colgate	F	Jeff Panzer, North Dakota
Jeff Farkas, Boston College	F	Steve Reinprecht, Wisconsin
East Second Team	Position	West Second Team
Ty Conklin, New Hampshire	G	Jayme Platt, Lake Superior State
Chris Dyment, Boston University	D	Mike Pudlick, St. Cloud State
Brian Pothier, Rensselaer	D	Mike Weaver, Michigan State
Brandon Dietrich, St. Lawrence	F	Mike Comrie, Michigan
Cory Larose, Maine	F	Lee Goren, North Dakota
Brad Tapper, Rensselaer	F	Dany Heatley, Wisconsin

=== CCHA ===
Awards		Recipient
Player of the Year		Shawn Horcoff, Michigan State
Best Defensive Forward		Shawn Horcoff, Michigan State
Best Defensive Defenseman		Mike Weaver, Michigan State
Best Offensive Defenseman		Jeff Jillson, Michigan
Rookie of the Year		Chris Gobert, Northern Michigan
Coach of the Year		Scott Borek, Lake Superior State
Terry Flanagan Memorial Award		Sean Peach, Michigan
Most Valuable Player in Tournament		Ryan Miller, Michigan State
All-CCHA Teams
First Team	Position	Second Team
Jayme Platt, Lake Superior State	G	Ryan Miller, Michigan State
Mike Weaver, Michigan State	D	Kevin Schmidt, Michigan State
Jeff Jillson, Michigan	D	Dave Huntzicker, Michigan
Roger Trudeau, Northern Michigan	F	David Gove, Western Michigan
Shawn Horcoff, Michigan State	F	Adam Hall, Michigan State
Mike Comrie, Michigan	F	Brian McCollough, Ferris State
Rookie Team	Position	
Ryan Miller, Michigan State	G	
Greg Zanon, Nebraska-Omaha	D	
Jimmy Jackson, Northern Michigan	D	
Andy Hilbert, Michigan	F	
Chris Gobert, Northern Michigan	F	
David Brisson, Nebraska-Omaha	F	

=== CHA ===
Award		Recipient
Player of the Year		Greg Gardner, Niagara
Rookie of the Year		Andy Berg, Air Force
Coach of the Year		Blaise MacDonald, Niagara
Student-Athlete of the Year		Jay Woodcroft, Alabama-Huntsville
Most Valuable Player in Tournament		Kyle Martin, Niagara
All-CHA Teams
First Team	Position	Second Team
Greg Gardner, Niagara	G	Steve Briere, Alabama-Huntsville
Chris MacKenzie, Niagara	D	Shane Stewart, Alabama-Huntsville
Stefan Bjork, Bemidji State	D	Brant Somerville, Findlay
Kyle Martin, Niagara	F	Mikko Sivonen, Niagara
Mike Isherwood, Niagara	F	Calvin Chartrand, Bemidji State
Nathan Bowen, Alabama-Huntsville	F	Brian Gornick, Air Force
Rookie Team	Position	
Bob Tallarico, Bemidji State	G	
Clay Simmons, Bemidji State	D	
Rico Faticci, Bemidji State	D	
Mike Funk, Alabama-Huntsville	F	
Andy Berg, Air Force	F	
Brad Johnson, Bemidji State	F	
Daryl Bat, Bemidji State	F	

=== ECAC ===
Award		Recipient
Player of the Year		Andy McDonald, Colgate
Rookie of the Year		Derek Gustafson, St. Lawrence
Coach of the Year		Don Vaughan, Colgate
Best Defensive Forward		Doug Stienstra, Cornell
Best Defensive Defenseman		Justin Harney, St. Lawrence
Ken Dryden Award		Joel Laing, Rensselaer
Most Outstanding Player in Tournament		Derek Gustafson, St. Lawrence
All-ECAC Hockey Teams
First Team	Position	Second Team
Joel Laing, Rensselaer	G	Derek Gustafson, St. Lawrence
Cory Murphy, Colgate	D	Kent Huskins, St. Lawrence
Justin Harney, Clarkson	D	Brian Pothier, Rensselaer
Andy McDonald, Colgate	F	Erik Anderson, St. Lawrence
Brad Tapper, Rensselaer	F	Erik Cole, Clarkson
Brandon Dietrich, St. Lawrence	F	Kirk Lamb, Princeton
Rookie Team	Position	
Derek Gustafson, St. Lawrence	G	
Trevor Byrne, Dartmouth	D	
Mark McRae, Cornell	D	
Dominic Moore, Harvard	F	
Marc Cavosie, Rensselaer	F	
Matt McRae, Cornell	F	

=== Hockey East ===
Award		Recipient
Player of the Year		Ty Conklin, New Hampshire
Player of the Year		Mike Mottau, Boston College
Rookie of the Year		Rick DiPietro, Boston University
Bob Kullen Coach of the Year Award		Jack Parker, Boston University
Len Ceglarski Sportsmanship Award		Cory Larose, Maine
Best Defensive Forward		John Sadowski, New Hampshire
Best Defensive Defenseman		Mike Mottau, Boston College
William Flynn Tournament Most Valuable Player		Niko Dimitrakos, Maine
All-Hockey East Teams
First Team	Position	Second Team
Ty Conklin, New Hampshire	G	Rick DiPietro, Boston University
Chris Dyment, Boston University	D	Bobby Allen, Boston College
Mike Mottau, Boston College	D	Pat Aufiero, Boston University
Jeff Farkas, Boston College	F	Blake Bellefeuille, Boston College
Brian Gionta, Boston College	F	Mike Souza, New Hampshire
Cory Larose, Maine	F	Darren Haydar, New Hampshire
Rookie Team	Position	
Rick DiPietro, Boston University	G	
Ron Hainsey, Massachusetts-Lowell	D	
Freddy Meyer, Boston University	D	
Anthony Aquino, Merrimack	F	
Brian Collins, Boston University	F	
Peter Fregoe, Providence	F	
Krys Kolanos, Boston College	F	

=== MAAC ===
Award		Recipient
Offensive Player of the Year		Shawn Mansoff, Quinnipiac
Defensive Player of the Year		Paul Colontino, Mercyhurst
Defensive Player of the Year		Steve Tobio, Bentley
Goaltender of the Year		Sean Weaver, Canisius
Offensive Rookie of the Year		Martin Paquet, Sacred Heart
Defensive Rookie of the Year		Nathan Lutz, Iona
Coach of the Year		Shaun Hannah, Sacred Heart
Tournament Most Valuable Player		Marc Senerchia, Connecticut
All-MAAC Teams
First Team	Position	Second Team
Sean Weaver, Canisius	G	Alexis Jutras-Binet, Sacred Heart
Paul Colontino, Mercyhurst	D	Nathan Lutz, Iona
Steve Tobio, Bentley	D	Jim Whelan, Holy Cross
Anthony DiPalma, Quinnipiac	D	
Shawn Mansoff, Quinnipiac	F	Eric Ellis, Mercyhurst
Ryan Carter, Iona	F	Louis Goulet, Mercyhurst
Ryan Soderquist, Bentley	F	Martin Paquet, Sacred Heart
Chris Cerrella, Quinnipiac	F	
Rookie Team	Position	
Mike Fraser, Iona	G	
Nathan Lutz, Iona	D	
Matt Erhart, Quinnipiac	D	
Les Hrapchak, Sacred Heart	D	
Rae Metz, Fairfield	F	
Martin Paquet, Sacred Heart	F	
Brian Herbert, Quinnipiac	F	

=== WCHA ===
Award		Recipient
Player of the Year		Steven Reinprecht, Wisconsin
Defensive Player of the Year		Jeff Dessner, Wisconsin
Rookie of the Year		Dany Heatley, Wisconsin
Student-Athlete of the Year		Jeff Scissons, Minnesota-Duluth
Coach of the Year		Don Brose, Minnesota State-Mankato
Most Valuable Player in Tournament		Lee Goren, North Dakota
All-WCHA Teams
First Team	Position	Second Team
Karl Goehring, North Dakota	G	Scott Meyer, St. Cloud State
Mike Pudlick, St. Cloud State	D	Jordan Leopold, Minnesota
Jeff Dessner, Wisconsin	D	Dylan Mills, Minnesota
Dany Heatley, Wisconsin	F	Tyler Arnason, St. Cloud State
Jeff Panzer, North Dakota	F	John Pohl, Minnesota
Steven Reinprecht, Wisconsin	F	Lee Goren, North Dakota
Third Team	Position	Rookie Team
Graham Melanson, Wisconsin	G	Corey McEachern, Alaska-Anchorage
Alex Brooks, Wisconsin	D	Travis Roche, North Dakota
Paul Manning, Colorado College	D	Brian Fahey, Wisconsin
Aaron Fox, Minnesota State-Mankato	F	Dany Heatley, Wisconsin
Jason Ulmer, North Dakota	F	Noah Clarke, Colorado College
Erik Westrum, Minnesota	F	Ryan Bayda, North Dakota

== 2000 NHL entry draft ==
Round	Pick	Player	College	Conference	NHL team
1	1	Rick DiPietro	Boston University	Hockey East	New York Islanders
1	2	Dany Heatley	Wisconsin	WCHA	Atlanta Thrashers
1	13	Ron Hainsey	Massachusetts–Lowell	Hockey East	Montreal Canadiens
1	18	Brooks Orpik	Boston College	Hockey East	Pittsburgh Penguins
1	19	Krys Kolanos	Boston College	Hockey East	Phoenix Coyotes
1	22	David Hale ^{†}	North Dakota	WCHA	New Jersey Devils
1	30	Jeff Taffe	Minnesota	WCHA	St. Louis Blues
2	35	Brad Winchester	Wisconsin	WCHA	Edmonton Oilers
2	37	Andy Hilbert	Michigan	CCHA	Boston Bruins
2	43	Matt Pettinger ^{‡}	Denver	WCHA	Washington Capitals
2	57	Matt DeMarchi	Minnesota	WCHA	New Jersey Devils
2	60	Dan Ellis ^{†}	Nebraska–Omaha	CCHA	Dallas Stars
2	62	Paul Martin ^{†}	Minnesota	WCHA	New Jersey Devils
3	77	Rob Fried ^{†}	Harvard	ECAC Hockey	Florida Panthers
3	80	Ryan Bayda	North Dakota	WCHA	Carolina Hurricanes
3	95	Dominic Moore	Harvard	ECAC Hockey	New York Rangers
4	99	Marc Cavosie	Rensselaer	ECAC Hockey	Minnesota Wild
4	103	Brett Nowak	Harvard	ECAC Hockey	Boston Bruins
4	104	Jon DiSalvatore	Providence	Hockey East	San Jose Sharks
4	119	Brian Fahey	Wisconsin	WCHA	Colorado Avalanche
4	122	Derrick Byfuglien ^{†}	North Dakota	WCHA	Ottawa Senators
4	129	Troy Riddle ^{†}	Minnesota	WCHA	St. Louis Blues
5	131	Matt Hendricks ^{†}	St. Cloud State	WCHA	Nashville Predators
5	137	Mike Stuart	Colorado College	WCHA	Nashville Predators
5	138	Paul Lynch ^{†}	Maine	Hockey East	Tampa Bay Lightning
5	140	Nathan Martz ^{†}	New Hampshire	Hockey East	New York Rangers
5	143	Brandon Snee	Union	ECAC Hockey	New York Rangers
5	145	Ryan Glenn ^{†}	St. Lawrence	ECAC Hockey	Montreal Canadiens
5	147	Matt McRae	Cornell	ECAC Hockey	Atlanta Thrashers
5	150	Tyler Kolarik ^{†}	Harvard	ECAC Hockey	Columbus Blue Jackets
5	153	Bill Cass	Boston College	Hockey East	Mighty Ducks of Anaheim
5	154	Matt Koalska ^{†}	Minnesota	WCHA	Nashville Predators
5	156	Greg Zanon	Nebraska–Omaha	CCHA	Ottawa Senators
5	157	Grant Potulny ^{†}	Minnesota	WCHA	Ottawa Senators
5	158	Sean Connolly	Northern Michigan	WCHA	Ottawa Senators
5	159	John-Michael Liles	Michigan State	CCHA	Colorado Avalanche
5	165	Nathan Marsters ^{†}	Rensselaer	ECAC Hockey	Los Angeles Kings
5	166	Nolan Schaefer	Providence	Hockey East	San Jose Sharks
5	167	Craig Weller ^{†}	Minnesota–Duluth	WCHA	St. Louis Blues
6	172	Scott Selig ^{†}	Northeastern	Hockey East	Montreal Canadiens
6	177	Mike Ayers ^{†}	New Hampshire	Hockey East	Chicago Blackhawks
6	178	Jeff Dwyer ^{†}	Yale	ECAC Hockey	Atlanta Thrashers
6	181	J. D. Forrest ^{†}	Boston College	Hockey East	Carolina Hurricanes
6	185	Patrick Foley	New Hampshire	Hockey East	Pittsburgh Penguins
6	189	Chris Bahen	Clarkson	ECAC Hockey	Colorado Avalanche
6	193	Joey Martin ^{†}	Minnesota	WCHA	Chicago Blackhawks
6	195	Colin Shields ^{†}	Maine	Hockey East	Philadelphia Flyers
7	198	Ken Magowan ^{†}	Boston University	Hockey East	New Jersey Devils
7	202	Ryan Caldwell ^{†}	Denver	WCHA	New York Islanders
7	207	Cliff Loya	Maine	Hockey East	Chicago Blackhawks
7	210	John Eichelberger ^{†}	Wisconsin	WCHA	Philadelphia Flyers
7	211	Joe Cullen	Colorado College	WCHA	Edmonton Oilers
7	216	Jim Abbott	New Hampshire	Hockey East	Pittsburgh Penguins
7	226	Brian Eklund	Brown	ECAC Hockey	Tampa Bay Lightning
8	231	Pete Zingoni ^{†}	Providence	Hockey East	Columbus Blue Jackets
8	235	Craig Kowalski ^{†}	Northern Michigan	WCHA	Carolina Hurricanes
8	238	Danny Eberly	Rensselaer	ECAC Hockey	New York Rangers
8	240	Adam Berkhoel ^{†}	Denver	WCHA	Tampa Bay Lightning
8	242	Evan Nielsen	Notre Dame	CCHA	Atlanta Thrashers
8	245	Dan Welch	Minnesota	WCHA	Los Angeles Kings
8	247	Jason Platt ^{†}	Providence	Hockey East	Edmonton Oilers
8	251	Todd Jackson ^{†}	Maine	Hockey East	Detroit Red Wings
8	259	Regan Kelly ^{†}	Providence	Hockey East	Philadelphia Flyers
9	266	Sean Kotary ^{†}	Bowling Green	CCHA	Colorado Avalanche
9	276	Troy Ferguson	Michigan State	CCHA	Carolina Hurricanes
9	280	Nick Boucher	Dartmouth	ECAC Hockey	Pittsburgh Penguins
9	288	Mark McRae	Cornell	ECAC Hockey	Atlanta Thrashers

† incoming freshman
‡ Pettinger had left school during the season

== See also ==
- 1999–2000 NCAA Division III men's ice hockey season
