= Cory Larose =

Canadian ice hockey player

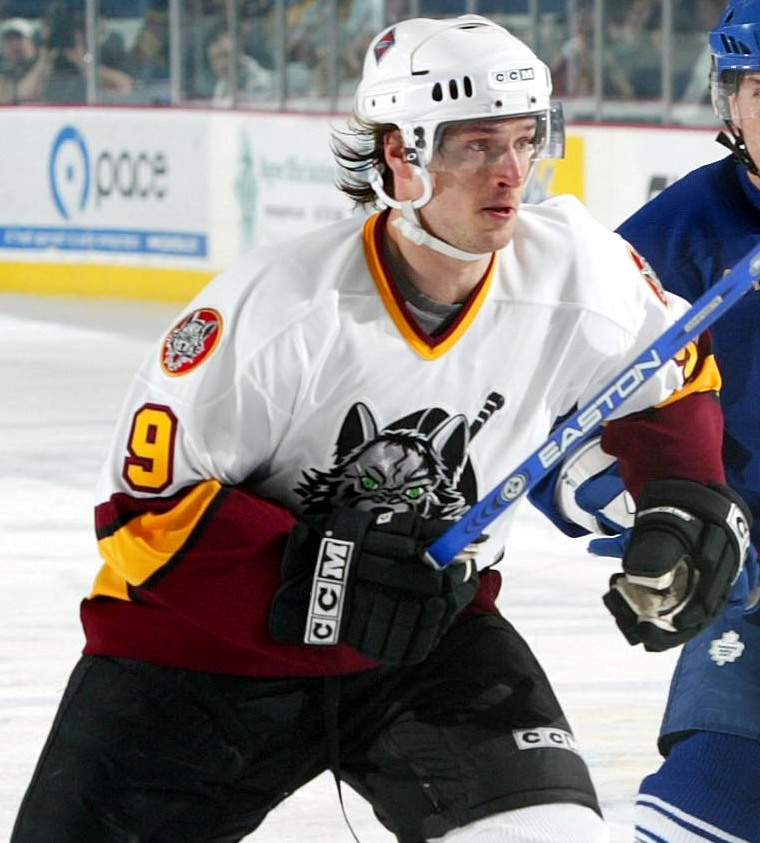
- Larose with the Chicago Wolves in 2007
- Born: May 14, 1975 (age 49); Campbellton, New Brunswick, Canada
- Height: 5 ft 11 in (180 cm)
- Weight: 190 lb (86 kg; 13 st 8 lb)
- Position: Centre
- Shot: Left
- Played for: Houston Aeros; Hartford Wolfpack; New York Rangers; Chicago Wolves; Langnau Tigers; Worcester Sharks; Luleå HF
- National team: Canada
- NHL draft: Undrafted
- Playing career: 2000–2011

Cory Larose (born May 14, 1975) is a Canadian former professional ice hockey player who played seven games in the National Hockey League (NHL) for the New York Rangers during the 2003–04 season. Larose played most of his career in the North American minor professional leagues and European leagues.

Larose was born in Campbellton, New Brunswick. Larose played junior hockey in British Columbia for the Langley Thunder. After two years with the Thunder, Larose entered the University of Maine. He played four seasons with Maine's Black Bears. After graduation, Larose signed with the Minnesota Wild as a free agent.

Larose played his first professional season in 2000–01 with the Cleveland Lumberjacks and the Jackson Bandits. He moved up to the Houston Aeros of the American Hockey League (AHL) for the 2001–02 season, and played part of the 2002–03 season when he was traded to the New York Rangers organization, joining the Hartford Wolfpack in February 2003. He played one further season in the Rangers' organization, including a seven-game call-up to the Rangers.

In 2004, he signed as a free agent with the Atlanta Thrashers. He played one season for the Thrashers' affiliate Chicago Wolves in the AHL, before playing a season with Langnau Tigers. In 2006, he attended the Thrashers training camp and was assigned again to Chicago. After a season with Chicago, Larose played another season in Europe, returning in 2008 to play for the San Jose Sharks' AHL affiliate Worcester Sharks. Larose then finished his career in Europe, playing until 2011.

== Career statistics ==
			Regular season					Playoffs
Season	Team	League	GP	G	A	Pts	PIM	GP	G	A	Pts	PIM
1993–94	Kimball Union	H.S.	21	18	11	29	14	—	—	—	—	—
1994–95	Langley Thunder	BCJHL	—	—	—	—	—	—	—	—	—	—
1995–96	Langley Thunder	BCJHL	54	28	46	74	61	—	—	—	—	—
1996–97	University of Maine	NCAA	35	10	27	32	38	—	—	—	—	—
1997–98	University of Maine	NCAA	34	15	25	40	22	—	—	—	—	—
1998–99	University of Maine	NCAA	38	21	31	52	34	—	—	—	—	—
1999–00	University of Maine	NCAA	39	15	36	51	45	—	—	—	—	—
2000–01	Cleveland Lumberjacks	IHL	4	1	1	2	6	—	—	—	—	—
2000–01	Jackson Bandits	ECHL	63	21	32	53	73	5	2	2	4	12
2001–02	Houston Aeros	AHL	78	32	32	64	73	14	6	8	14	15
2002–03	Houston Aeros	AHL	58	18	38	56	57	—	—	—	—	—
2002–03	Hartford Wolf Pack	AHL	24	9	10	19	20	2	0	1	1	0
2003–04	Hartford Wolf Pack	AHL	69	13	36	49	66	14	4	6	10	24
2003–04	New York Rangers	NHL	7	0	1	1	4	—	—	—	—	—
2004–05	Chicago Wolves	AHL	80	26	37	63	44	18	6	6	12	29
2005–06	Langnau	Swiss-A	42	17	14	31	79	—	—	—	—	—
2006–07	Chicago Wolves	AHL	63	22	61	83	75	15	3	4	7	21
2007–08	Luleå HF	SEL	47	10	18	28	83	—	—	—	—	—
2008–09	Worcester Sharks	AHL	53	19	21	40	38	8	1	1	2	4
NHL totals			7	0	1	1	4	—	—	—	—	—
AHL totals			425	139	235	374	373	71	20	26	46	93

=== Trades ===
- May 11, 2000 – signed by the Minnesota Wild as a free agent.
- February 20, 2003 – traded to the New York Rangers for Jay Henderson.
- July 14, 2004 – signed by the Atlanta Thrashers as a free agent.
- May 23, 2007 – signed with Ak Bars as a free agent
- October 8, 2007 – signed with Luleå Hockey from Ak Bars.
- July 15, 2008 – signed by the San Jose Sharks as a free agent.

== Awards and honours ==
Award	Year
All-Hockey East Rookie Team	1996–97
All-Hockey East First Team	1999–00
AHCA East Second-Team All-American	1999–00
Hockey East All-Tournament Team	2000

Awards and achievements
Preceded by Steve Kariya	Len Ceglarski Sportsmanship Award; 1999–00	Succeeded by Mike Jozefowicz
Preceded by Jason Krog	Hockey East Scoring Champion; 1999–00	Succeeded by Brian Gionta
