= Mishar =

Mishar (Cyrillic: Мишар) may refer to:

- Mishar Tatar dialect, a dialect of the Tatar language
- Mishar Tatars, an ethnic group of Tatars
- Mišar, a town in Serbia
- Mishar (cartoonist), Malaysian cartoonist

== See also ==
- Misar (disambiguation)
- Mischer (disambiguation)
- Misra (disambiguation)
- Misharin, a surname
