= Carl Corazzini =

American ice hockey player (born 1979)

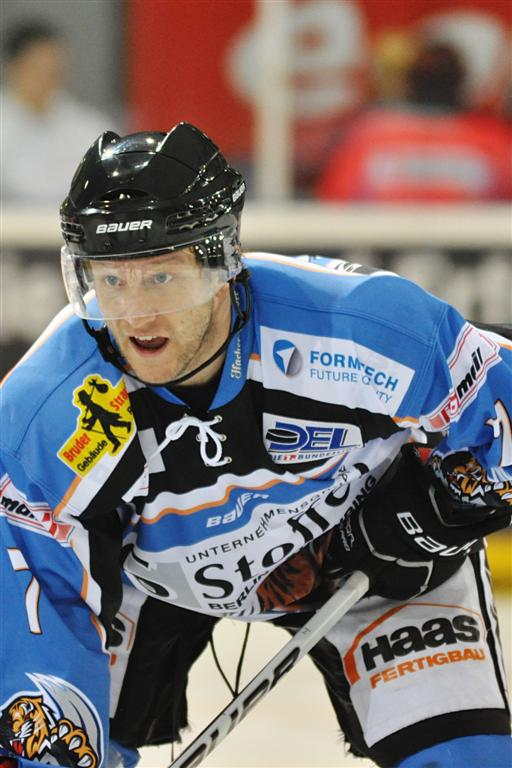
- Born: April 21, 1979 (age 47) Framingham, Massachusetts, U.S.
- Height: 5 ft 9 in (175 cm)
- Weight: 176 lb (80 kg; 12 st 8 lb)
- Position: Right wing
- Shot: Right
- Played for: Boston Bruins; Chicago Blackhawks
- NHL draft: Undrafted
- Playing career: 2001–2011

Carl Robert Corazzini (born April 21, 1979) is an American former professional ice hockey player who played in the National Hockey League, American Hockey League, ECHL, and in Sweden and Germany between 2001 and 2011. He played 19 games in the NHL with the Boston Bruins and Chicago Blackhawks.

== Playing career ==
As a youth, he played in the 1993 Quebec International Pee-Wee Hockey Tournament with the Boston Braves minor ice hockey team.

In high school, Corazzini played for Saint Sebastian's School in Needham, Massachusetts where he was team captain as a senior. In college, he played for Boston University and was the team captain in his final year.

On August 8, 2001, he was signed by the Boston Bruins as a free agent. He scored his first NHL goal with the Bruins in a game against the New York Rangers. On July 16, 2006, Corazzini signed a one-year contract with the Chicago Blackhawks. Before the 2007–08 season, he signed a one-year contract with the Detroit Red Wings.

After recording career highs in assists and points with the Grand Rapids Griffins during the 2007–08 season, Corazzini signed a one-year, two-way contract with the Edmonton Oilers on July 15, 2008.

== Coaching career ==
Corazzini is currently the head coach at St. Mark's School in the ISL league, Eberhart division. In his first year as head coach (2014/15), St. Mark's won the Eberhart and NEPSAC Piatelli/Simmons (Small School) Championships. The team followed up with a second NEPSAC Championship in Corazzini's second year as coach. Corazzini has coached countless players who went on to star in college and international competition. The first of his former players to be drafted was selected by the Anaheim Ducks in the 2019 NHL Entry Draft.

== Career statistics ==
=== Regular season and playoffs ===
			Regular season					Playoffs
Season	Team	League	GP	G	A	Pts	PIM	GP	G	A	Pts	PIM
1996–97	Saint Sebastian's School	HS-MA	25	29	31	60	—	—	—	—	—	—
1997–98	Boston University	HE	37	9	6	15	4	—	—	—	—	—
1998–99	Boston University	HE	37	15	9	24	12	—	—	—	—	—
1999–00	Boston University	HE	42	22	20	42	44	—	—	—	—	—
2000–01	Boston University	HE	35	16	20	36	48	—	—	—	—	—
2001–02	Providence Bruins	AHL	61	7	8	15	10	—	—	—	—	—
2002–03	Providence Bruins	AHL	33	7	6	13	4	4	0	0	0	0
2002–03	Atlantic City Boardwalk Bullies	ECHL	27	13	8	21	14	—	—	—	—	—
2003–04	Boston Bruins	NHL	12	2	0	2	0	—	—	—	—	—
2003–04	Providence Bruins	AHL	62	16	9	25	6	2	1	0	1	2
2004–05	Providence Bruins	AHL	8	0	0	0	0	—	—	—	—	—
2004–05	Hershey Bears	AHL	52	10	13	23	6	—	—	—	—	—
2005–06	Norfolk Admirals	AHL	75	26	29	55	16	4	2	2	4	0
2006–07	Chicago Blackhawks	NHL	7	0	1	1	2	—	—	—	—	—
2006–07	Norfolk Admirals	AHL	68	28	29	57	18	6	4	1	5	2
2007–08	Grand Rapids Griffins	AHL	80	24	36	60	14	—	—	—	—	—
2008–09	Springfield Falcons	AHL	55	7	12	19	18	—	—	—	—	—
2008–09	Peoria Rivermen	AHL	25	4	9	13	4	7	2	0	2	6
2009–10	Pelicans	FIN	5	0	1	1	0	—	—	—	—	—
2009–10	Västerås IK	SWE-2	8	1	0	1	2	—	—	—	—	—
2009–10	ERC Ingolstadt	DEL	15	5	5	10	2	10	3	1	4	0
2010–11	Straubing Tigers	DEL	50	10	19	29	35	—	—	—	—	—
AHL totals			519	129	151	280	96	23	9	3	12	10
NHL totals			19	2	1	3	2	—	—	—	—	—

== Awards and honors ==
Award	Year
All-Hockey East Rookie Team	1997–98
All-Hockey East First Team	2000–01
AHCA East Second-Team All-American	2000–01
