= Dave Noël-Bernier =

Canadian ice hockey player

- Born: September 20, 1975 (age 51) Montmagny, Quebec, Canada
- Height: 5 ft 10 in (178 cm)
- Weight: 195 lb (88 kg; 13 st 13 lb)
- Position: Forward
- Shot: Left
- Played for: LNAH; Thetford Mines Prolab; UHL; Muskegon Fury; Germany; EA Kempten; SC Riessersee; EHC München
- NHL draft: Undrafted
- Playing career: 2001–2007 Coaching career

Current position
- Title: Assistant coach
- Team: Omaha
- Conference: NCHC

Biographical details
- Education: University of Nebraska Omaha

Coaching career (HC unless noted)
- 2010–2013: Muskegon Lumberjacks (asst)
- 2013–2014: Grand Rapids Christian (asst)
- 2014–2015: Grand Rapids Griffins (asst)
- 2015–2017: Detroit Red Wings (video)
- 2017–Present: Omaha (asst)

Dave Noël-Bernier (born September 20, 1975) is a Canadian former professional ice hockey player. He was an assistant coach with the Detroit Red Wings of the National Hockey League (NHL) and is now an assistant coach at the University of Nebraska at Omaha (NCHC).

== Playing career ==
In his final year at the University of Nebraska at Omaha, Noel-Bernier graduated with a degree in exercise science and received UNO Student Athlete of the Year, UNO Male Scholar Athlete of the Year and CCHA All-Academic Team honours.

Coming out of university, Noel-Bernier played with the Thetford Mines Prolab and Montmagny Sentinelles for the 2001–02 season. Noel-Bernier then played with the German team EA Kempten for the 2002–03 season before returning to North America. Noel-Bernier joined the Muskegon Fury of the United Hockey League for the 2003–04 season. While helping lead the Fury to the Colonial Cup III, Noel-Bernier was named to the UHL All-Star Game as well as the Fury Team Rookie of the Year. He played two seasons with the SC Riessersee and split the 2005–06 season with the EHC München in the 2nd Bundesliga.

Prior to the 2006–07 season, Noel-Bernier agreed to a one-year contract with the Muskegon Fury.

== Coaching career ==
From 2007 until 2010, Noel-Bernier served as the director of hockey operations for the University of Nebraska at Omaha.

In 2010, Noel-Bernier was hired as an assistant coach for the Muskegon Lumberjacks of the United States Hockey League. He resigned from the position in December 2012. The following year, Noel-Bernier served as the director of hockey operations for the Grand Rapids Blades youth program before joining the Grand Rapids Griffins in the American Hockey League as an assistant coach on August 20, 2014.

On June 23, 2015, the Detroit Red Wings of the NHL announced that Noel-Bernier would serve as an assistant coach under head coach Jeff Blashill. On April 21, 2017, Noel-Bernier was named an assistant coach for the University of Nebraska at Omaha.
