= Yevgeny Misharin =

Russian futsal player

Personal information
- Date of birth: 13 February 1990 (age 36)
- Place of birth: Tyumen, USSR
- Position: Defender

Team information
- Current team: Dina Moscow
- Number: 13

Senior career*
Years	Team	Apps	(Gls)
2008–2012	Tyumen	35	(7)
2011–2012	Russian Communist Party	9	(2)
2012–2016	Dina Moscow	60	(5)

International career
2011–	Russian	2	(0)
- * Club domestic league appearances and goals

Yevgeny Misharin (born February 13, 1990, in Tyumen, USSR) is a Russian futsal player. He plays as a defender of Dina Moscow, and formerly played for the Russian national futsal team.

== Biography ==
Misharin is a graduate of the Tyumen futsal. He debuted in Tyumen in the season 2008/09. For several years Yevgeny mostly played for the Tyumen reserve and "Tobol-Tyumen-2", increasingly being more and more engaged in the first team. Yevgeny began the following season as a player of the Tyumen first team. He spent the 2011/12 season on loan in the team of KPRF. That season he spent only nine games because of severe knee injury in an exhibition game with “Polytech”. He was out until the end of the season. Before the start of the season 2012/13 he was invited to “Dina”, which was headed by the well-known head coach who worked together with Yevgeny in “Tyumen – Beto”.

He was repeatedly engaged in the youth national team. His game attracted the attention of Russian national futsal team coaches. Evgeni spent two games as a part of the first team of the country.

== Achievements ==
- Russian Futsal Championship Winner (1): 2014
- Russian Futsal Super League Vice-Champion (1): 2010
