= Brian Fahey (ice hockey) =

American ice hockey player (born 1981)

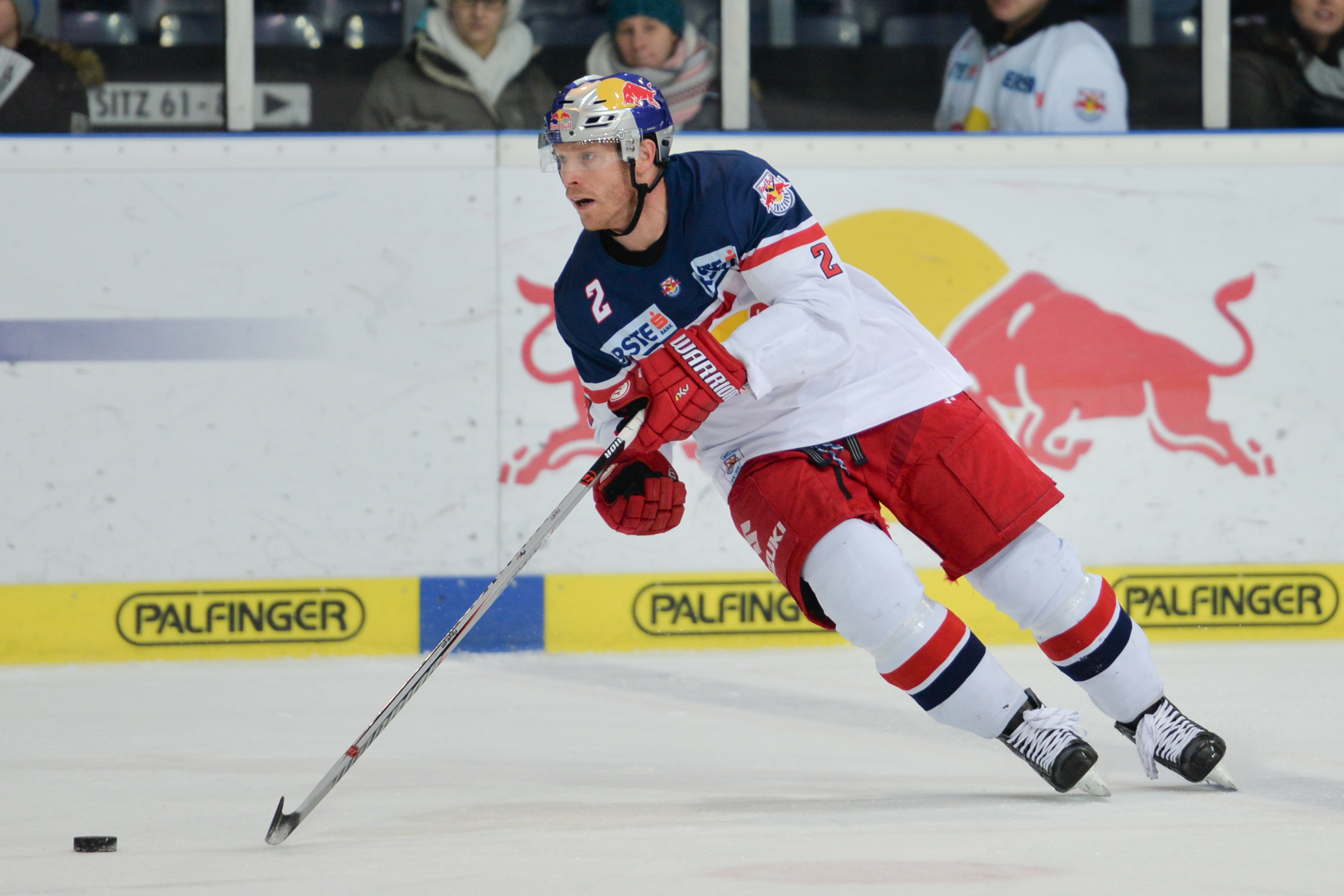
- Born: March 2, 1981 (age 45) Des Plaines, Illinois, U.S.
- Height: 6 ft 1 in (185 cm)
- Weight: 200 lb (91 kg; 14 st 4 lb)
- Position: Defense
- Shot: Right
- Played for: Washington Capitals; Vityaz Chekhov; EC Red Bull Salzburg
- NHL draft: 119th overall, 2000; Colorado Avalanche
- Playing career: 2003–2016

Brian P. Fahey (born March 2, 1981) is an American former professional ice hockey defenseman who played in the National Hockey League (NHL) with the Washington Capitals. Fahey was born in Des Plaines, Illinois, but grew up in Glenview, Illinois.

== Playing career ==
Fahey was drafted 199th overall in the 2000 NHL entry draft by the Colorado Avalanche. Fahey played collegiate hockey with the University of Wisconsin in the WCHA. Fahey, an USNTDP product, was named in the WCHA All-Rookie team in 2000. Following his senior year in 2002–03, and unsigned from the Avalanche, Fahey made his professional debut in the 2003–04 season primarily in the ECHL with the Atlantic City Boardwalk Bullies.

After brief call-ups to the Worcester IceCats of the AHL during the next two-seasons, Fahey was invited to the Dallas Stars training camp for the 2005–06 season. Fahey was then signed to a one-year contract with the Stars on September 20, 2005. Brian was then assigned to Stars affiliate, the Iowa Stars for the season.

On August 31, 2006, Fahey was signed by the Chicago Wolves of the AHL. After his first season with the Wolves in the 2006–07, he was awarded the "Tim Breslin Unsung Hero Award" - Given annually to the Wolves player who best typifies the on-ice spirit and team-first attitude of Tim Breslin. In the 2007–08 season, Fahey was a part of the Wolves Calder Cup Championship team, scoring 10 points in 24 playoff contests.

Fahey signed with the New York Rangers to a two-year contract on July 18, 2008. Fahey, now an established AHL veteran, scored 24 points in 66 games with the Hartford Wolf Pack in the 2008–09 season.

On July 16, 2009, Fahey was traded by the Rangers to his original draft team, the Colorado Avalanche, for Nigel Williams. He was assigned to Avalanche AHL affiliate, the Lake Erie Monsters, to begin the 2009–10 season. On November 27, 2009, Fahey finally received his first NHL recall, however despite training with the team for two weeks and over a duration of 9 games, he never made his debut with the Avalanche. Brian finished the season leading Lake Erie with 11 goals in 71 games.

On July 7, 2010, Fahey returned to the Hershey Bears signing a one-year two-way contract with the Washington Capitals organization for the 2010–11 season. As a final cut from the Capitals training camp, Fahey reported to Hershey as a veteran leader to begin the season. After two games with the Bears, and with the Capitals suffering early injury ailments, he made his long-awaited NHL debut against the Nashville Predators in a 3-2 overtime win on October 16, 2010.

On August 31, 2011, Fahey signed an AHL contract with the Rockford IceHogs, the Chicago Blackhawks' top AHL affiliate, for the 2011–12 season.

On July 17, 2012, Fahey left North America and signed his first contract abroad on a one-year deal with Vityaz Chekhov of the Russian Kontinental Hockey League. During the 2012–13 season, Fahey integrated himself as a mainstay on the blueline for Vityaz, scoring 5 goals and 15 points in 52 games.

On August 14, 2013, Fahey moved to European club, EC Red Bull Salzburg of the Austrian Hockey League, on a one-year deal.

== Career statistics ==
=== Regular season and playoffs ===
			Regular season					Playoffs
Season	Team	League	GP	G	A	Pts	PIM	GP	G	A	Pts	PIM
1997–98	US NTDP Juniors	USHL	5	1	1	2	8	—	—	—	—	—
1997–98	US NTDP U18	NAHL	39	5	10	15	35	7	0	0	0	2
1997–98	US NTDP U18	USDP	17	1	10	11	12	—	—	—	—	—
1998–99	US NTDP Juniors	USHL	52	9	9	18	34	—	—	—	—	—
1998–99	US NTDP U18	USDP	6	1	0	1	4	—	—	—	—	—
1999–2000	University of Wisconsin	WCHA	41	6	11	17	40	—	—	—	—	—
2000–01	University of Wisconsin	WCHA	38	1	5	6	16	—	—	—	—	—
2001–02	University of Wisconsin	WCHA	38	2	8	10	55	—	—	—	—	—
2002–03	University of Wisconsin	WCHA	39	5	4	9	34	—	—	—	—	—
2003–04	Atlantic City Boardwalk Bullies	ECHL	55	11	26	37	49	2	0	0	0	2
2003–04	Worcester IceCats	AHL	2	0	0	0	2	—	—	—	—	—
2003–04	Hershey Bears	AHL	12	0	1	1	6	—	—	—	—	—
2004–05	Atlantic City Boardwalk Bullies	ECHL	46	10	16	26	47	3	0	2	2	0
2004–05	Worcester IceCats	AHL	20	0	4	4	12	—	—	—	—	—
2005–06	Iowa Stars	AHL	64	6	11	17	74	7	0	1	1	8
2005–06	Idaho Steelheads	ECHL	3	1	1	2	4	—	—	—	—	—
2006–07	Chicago Wolves	AHL	75	11	18	29	81	15	3	2	5	20
2007–08	Chicago Wolves	AHL	76	14	23	37	123	24	2	8	10	24
2008–09	Hartford Wolf Pack	AHL	66	4	20	24	67	5	0	1	1	6
2009–10	Lake Erie Monsters	AHL	71	11	14	25	97	—	—	—	—	—
2010–11	Hershey Bears	AHL	60	4	25	29	64	6	1	0	1	4
2010–11	Washington Capitals	NHL	7	0	1	1	2	—	—	—	—	—
2011–12	Rockford IceHogs	AHL	75	6	16	22	56	—	—	—	—	—
2012–13	Vityaz Chekhov	KHL	52	5	10	15	30	—	—	—	—	—
2013–14	EC Red Bull Salzburg	AUT	54	11	18	29	75	13	2	9	11	10
2014–15	EC Red Bull Salzburg	AUT	31	8	16	24	20	13	3	11	14	11
2015–16	EC Red Bull Salzburg	AUT	52	16	20	36	42	19	5	5	10	16
AHL totals			521	56	133	189	582	57	6	12	18	62
NHL totals			7	0	1	1	2	—	—	—	—	—

=== International ===
Year	Team	Event	Result	GP	G	A	Pts	PIM
1999	United States	WJC18	7th	6	1	0	1	4
Junior totals				6	1	0	1	4

== Awards and honors ==
Award	Year
WCHA
All-Rookie Team	2000
ECHL
All-Rookie Team	2004
AHL
Calder Cup	2008
