= Jayme Platt =

American ice hockey player

- Born: July 26, 1978 (age 47) Redmond, Washington, U.S.
- Height: 6 ft 0 in (183 cm)
- Weight: 175 lb (79 kg; 12 st 7 lb)
- Position: Goaltender
- Catches: Left
- UHL team Former teams: Free agent Basingstoke Bison
- Playing career: 1995–present

Jayme Platt (born July 26, 1978) is an American retired ice hockey goaltender.

== Early life ==
Platt was born in Redmond, Washington. He began his career playing at junior level for the Des Moines Buccaneers in the USHL. In two seasons with the Buccaneers, Platt played in 41 regular season and two post season games.

In 1997 he began his university level career, playing in the NCAA for Lake Superior State University. Platt spent four seasons with Lake Superior.

== Career ==
Platt was signed by the Greenville Grrrowl for the 2001–2002 season. In his first senior season, Platt played in 40 games, and kept his goals against average down to 2.53.

Platt played for the Grrrowl the following season, but also spend time icing for the Dayton Bombers as well as a handful of games for the AHL Lowell Lock Monsters. During the 2003–2004 season, Platt made the decision to move to Europe and sign for the EIHL team the Manchester Phoenix. It was a move which brought the best from Platt, who was voted into the EIHL All-Star Second Team. In 56 games, his goals against average was 2.60. Platt later signed with the Phoenix's rivals, the Sheffield Steelers. In 41 games, he kept his average down to 2.15, improving again from his previous season.

Platt later signed with the Basingstoke Bison. He played in just five games for the Bison before being released by mutual consent. Platt returned to North America and signed for the Danbury Trashers of the UHL, where he finished 2005–2006 season. Due to the fraud scandal which enveloped the Trashers, the franchise was suspended from operations in 2006. Platt retired as a player afterwards.

== Awards and honours ==
| Award | Year |
|---|---|
| All-CCHA First Team | 1999–00 |
| AHCA West Second-Team All-American | 1999–00 |
| EIHL Second-Team All-Star | 2003–04 |
