= Krys Kolanos =

Canadian ice hockey player (born 1981)

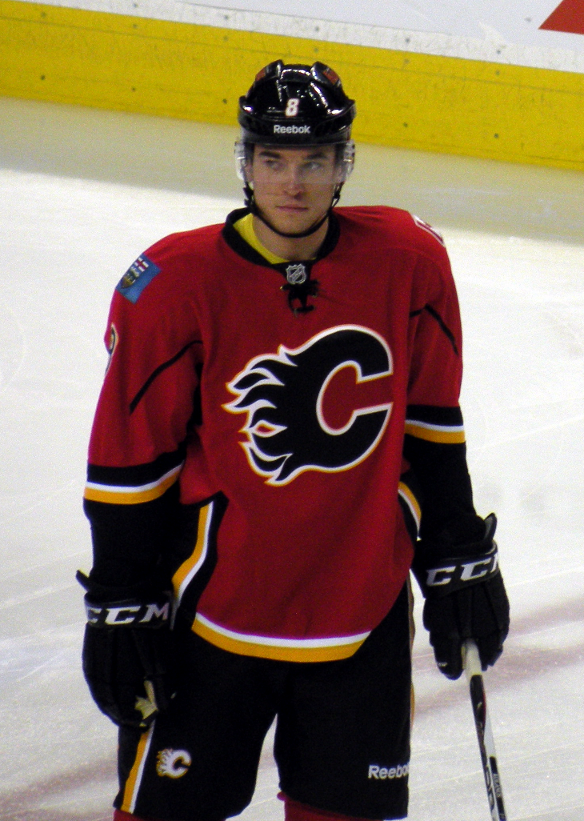
- Born: July 27, 1981 (age 44) Calgary, Alberta, Canada
- Height: 6 ft 3 in (191 cm)
- Weight: 206 lb (93 kg; 14 st 10 lb)
- Position: Centre
- Shot: Right
- Played for: Phoenix Coyotes; Espoo Blues; Krefeld Pinguine; Edmonton Oilers; SCL Tigers; EV Zug; Minnesota Wild; Calgary Flames; Torpedo Nizhny Novgorod; KHL Medveščak Zagreb
- National team: Canada
- NHL draft: 19th overall, 2000; Phoenix Coyotes
- Playing career: 2001–2018

Krystofer Stanley "Krys" Kolanos (born July 27, 1981) is a Canadian-Polish former professional ice hockey centre. He played with the Phoenix Coyotes, Edmonton Oilers, Minnesota Wild, and Calgary Flames in his National Hockey League (NHL) career.

== Playing career ==
Kolanos was selected in the first round, 19th overall, in the 2000 NHL entry draft by the Phoenix Coyotes from Boston College. In college, he scored the game-winning goal in overtime for Boston College in the National Championship.

Kolanos' career was mostly limited by a serious concussion after Václav Varaďa hit him from behind and knocked him unconscious in a game on January 19, 2002. Varaďa received a major penalty and game misconduct as a result of his actions.

Perhaps the most memorable moment in Kolanos' NHL career occurred during his rookie season on March 31, 2002 when, despite lingering post-concussion symptoms, he scored a penalty shot goal against all-star Patrick Roy, after which the now Hall of Famer reacted emotionally and was assessed a 10-minute misconduct and a game misconduct.

Kolanos reported to the 2007 Calgary Flames' training camp. On September 19, 2007, Kolanos was assigned to the Calgary Flames' AHL affiliate, the Quad City Flames; however he did not report to the team. He later signed with Quad City in November for the 2007-08 season.

On July 11, 2008, Kolanos signed a one-year contract with the Minnesota Wild. Kolanos was assigned to the Houston Aeros to start the 2008-09 season. Kolanos was recalled multiple times by the Wild as an injury replacement, Krys was recalled for a month in January and played in 21 games adding 6 points, before returning for the Aeros playoff run.

On July 17, 2009, Kolanos signed a one-year contract with the Philadelphia Flyers. He was then assigned to AHL affiliate, the Adirondack Phantoms, for the 2009–10 season.

On February 1, 2012, Kolanos signed a two-year, two way contract with the Calgary Flames and was subsequently called up to the NHL the same day.

== Personal information ==
Krys Kolanos' younger brother, Mark Kolanos, is also a professional hockey player in Scotland.

== Career statistics ==
=== Regular season and playoffs ===
			Regular season					Playoffs
Season	Team	League	GP	G	A	Pts	PIM	GP	G	A	Pts	PIM
1996–97	Calgary Flames AAA	AMHL	24	24	35	59		—	—	—	—	—
1997–98	Calgary Buffaloes AAA	AMHL	34	34	43	77	29	—	—	—	—	—
1998–99	Calgary Royals	AJHL	58	43	67	110	98	—	—	—	—	—
1999–2000	Boston College	HE	42	16	16	32	50	—	—	—	—	—
2000–01	Boston College	HE	41	25	25	50	54	—	—	—	—	—
2001–02	Phoenix Coyotes	NHL	57	11	11	22	48	2	0	0	0	6
2002–03	Phoenix Coyotes	NHL	2	0	0	0	0	—	—	—	—	—
2003–04	Phoenix Coyotes	NHL	41	4	6	10	24	—	—	—	—	—
2003–04	Springfield Falcons	AHL	32	10	11	21	38	—	—	—	—	—
2004–05	Blues	SM-l	15	7	9	16	40	—	—	—	—	—
2004–05	Krefeld Pinguine	DEL	7	3	2	5	16	—	—	—	—	—
2005–06	Phoenix Coyotes	NHL	9	2	1	3	2	—	—	—	—	—
2005–06	San Antonio Rampage	AHL	3	0	1	1	0	—	—	—	—	—
2005–06	Edmonton Oilers	NHL	6	0	0	0	2	—	—	—	—	—
2005–06	Lowell Lock Monsters	AHL	19	10	11	21	40	—	—	—	—	—
2005–06	Wilkes–Barre/Scranton Penguins	AHL	18	10	8	18	19	11	2	0	2	16
2006–07	Grand Rapids Griffins	AHL	17	6	6	12	8	—	—	—	—	—
2006–07	SCL Tigers	NLA	14	2	9	11	48	—	—	—	—	—
2006–07	EV Zug	NLA	—	—	—	—	—	8	6	0	6	8
2007–08	Quad City Flames	AHL	65	30	33	63	84	—	—	—	—	—
2008–09	Houston Aeros	AHL	45	31	20	51	42	18	6	8	14	18
2008–09	Minnesota Wild	NHL	21	3	3	6	16	—	—	—	—	—
2009–10	Adirondack Phantoms	AHL	27	9	6	15	22	—	—	—	—	—
2011–12	Abbotsford Heat	AHL	47	30	31	61	47	7	5	5	10	6
2011–12	Calgary Flames	NHL	13	0	1	1	2	—	—	—	—	—
2012–13	Abbotsford Heat	AHL	53	18	22	40	63	—	—	—	—	—
2013–14	Torpedo Nizhny Novgorod	KHL	3	0	0	0	16	5	1	0	1	4
2014–15	KHL Medveščak Zagreb	KHL	6	3	2	5	2	—	—	—	—	—
2016–17	Starbulls Rosenheim	DEU.2	7	1	2	3	39	—	—	—	—	—
2016–17	HC Asiago	ITA	2	2	0	2	2	—	—	—	—	—
2016–17	HC Asiago	AlpsHL	9	14	8	22	16	13	8	12	20	16
2017–18	GKS Tychy	POL	16	8	8	16	20	—	—	—	—	—
2017–18	SG Cortina	AlpsHL	7	10	4	14	6	—	—	—	—	—
NHL totals			149	20	22	42	94	2	0	0	0	6
AHL totals			326	154	149	303	363	36	13	13	26	40

=== International ===
Year	Team	Event	Result	GP	G	A	Pts	PIM
2003	Canada	WC	1st place, gold medalist(s)	9	0	1	1	6
Senior totals				9	0	1	1	6

== Awards and honours ==
Award	Year
All-Hockey East Rookie Team	1999–00
All-Hockey East Second Team	2000–01
AHCA East Second-Team All-American	2000–01
All-NCAA All-Tournament Team	2001
NHL YoungStars Game	2001–02

Awards and achievements
Preceded by Kirill Safronov	Phoenix Coyotes first-round draft pick 2000	Succeeded by Fredrik Sjostrom
