= Jeff Farkas =

American ice hockey player (born 1978)

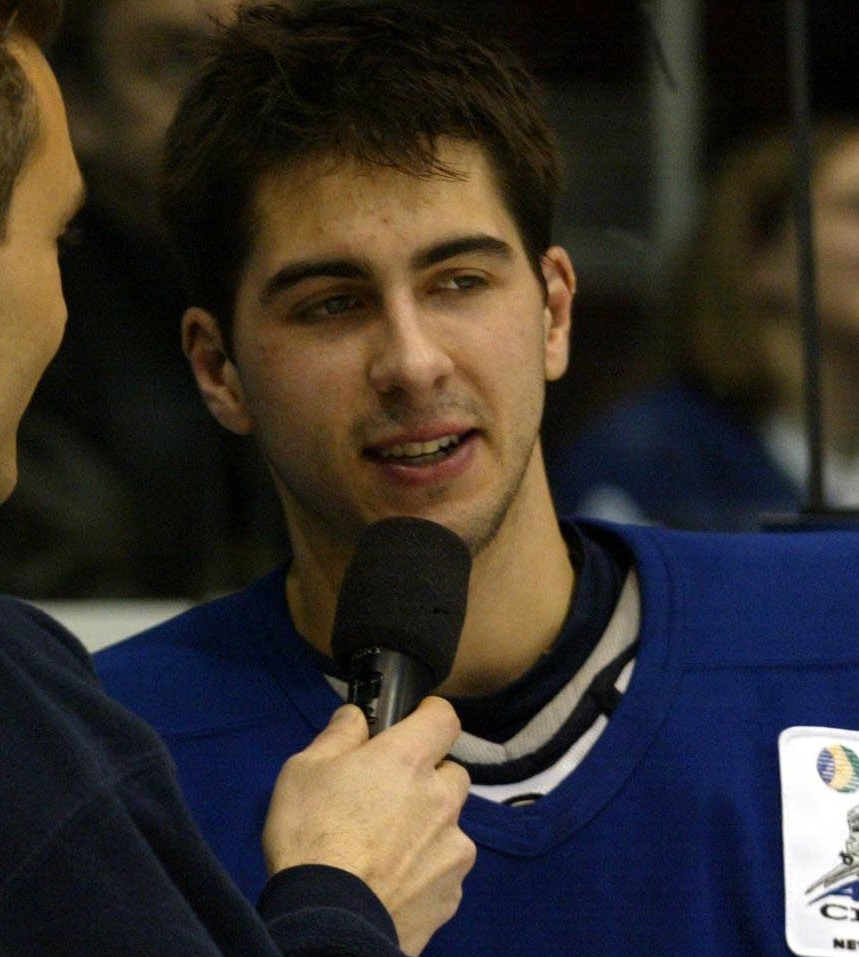
- Born: January 24, 1978 (age 48) Williamsville, New York, U.S.
- Height: 6 ft 0 in (183 cm)
- Weight: 185 lb (84 kg; 13 st 3 lb)
- Position: Center
- Shot: Left
- Played for: Toronto Maple Leafs; Atlanta Thrashers
- National team: United States
- NHL draft: 57th overall, 1997; Toronto Maple Leafs
- Playing career: 2000–2003

Jeffrey Thomas Farkas (born January 24, 1978) is an American former professional ice hockey center. He was drafted in the third round, 57th overall, by the Toronto Maple Leafs in the 1997 NHL entry draft. He played 11 games in the National Hockey League (NHL) for the Maple Leafs and Atlanta Thrashers between 2000 and 2003, mainly playing in the minor American Hockey League (AHL), before a spinal injury during a game forced his early retirement. Internationally Farkas played for the American national junior team at three World Junior Championships, winning a silver medal in 1997.

== Playing career ==
After playing four seasons of college hockey for Boston College, Farkas joined the Maple Leafs' roster for the 2000 Stanley Cup Playoffs. He appeared in three games during that postseason, recording one goal. Despite his playoff success, Farkas appeared in only eight games for the Maple Leafs over the next two seasons, and three more for the Atlanta Thrashers during the 2002–03 season.

While playing for the American Hockey League's Chicago Wolves in 2003, Farkas was pushed from behind, and fell headfirst into the boards during a game against the Rochester Americans. He suffered a fractured fifth cervical fracture and, according to medical reports, came within millimeters of being rendered quadriplegic. The injury forced Farkas' early retirement from the sport.

In 2014 Farkas was inducted into the Boston College Varsity Club Hall of Fame.

== Career statistics ==
=== Regular season and playoffs ===
			Regular season					Playoffs
Season	Team	League	GP	G	A	Pts	PIM	GP	G	A	Pts	PIM
1993–94	Nichols School	CISAA	28	27	57	84	25	—	—	—	—	—
1994–95	Niagara Scenic	EJHL	47	54	55	99	70	—	—	—	—	—
1995–96	Niagara Scenic	MetJHL	47	42	70	112	75	—	—	—	—	—
1996–97	Boston College	HE	35	13	23	36	34	—	—	—	—	—
1997–98	Boston College	HE	40	11	28	39	42	—	—	—	—	—
1998–99	Boston College	HE	43	32	25	57	56	—	—	—	—	—
1999–00	Boston College	HE	41	32	26	58	61	—	—	—	—	—
1999–00	Toronto Maple Leafs	NHL	—	—	—	—	—	3	1	0	1	0
2000–01	St. John's Maple Leafs	AHL	77	28	40	68	62	4	1	2	3	4
2000–01	Toronto Maple Leafs	NHL	2	0	0	0	2	—	—	—	—	—
2001–02	Toronto Maple Leafs	NHL	6	0	2	2	4	2	0	0	0	0
2001–02	St. John's Maple Leafs	AHL	71	16	34	50	49	4	0	0	0	0
2002–03	Manitoba Moose	AHL	39	11	14	25	28	—	—	—	—	—
2002–03	Atlanta Thrashers	NHL	3	0	0	0	0	—	—	—	—	—
2002–03	Chicago Wolves	AHL	24	5	12	17	14	—	—	—	—	—
AHL totals			211	60	100	160	153	8	1	2	3	4
NHL totals			11	0	2	2	6	5	1	0	1	0

=== International ===
Medal record

Representing United States

Men's ice hockey

World Junior Championships
Silver medal – second place	1997 Switzerland	

Year	Team	Event	Results	GP	G	A	Pts	PIM
1996	United States	WJC	5th	6	1	1	2	6
1997	United States	WJC	2nd place, silver medalist(s)	6	1	1	2	4
1998	United States	WJC	5th	7	6	4	10	6
Junior totals				19	8	6	14	16

== Awards and honors ==
Award	Year
Hockey East All-Tournament Team	1998, 1999
All-Hockey East First Team	1999–00
AHCA East First-Team All-American	1999–00
All-NCAA All-Tournament Team	2000
