= 1999–2000 NCAA Division I men's ice hockey rankings =

- NCAA tournament: 2000
- NCAA champion: North Dakota
- Preseason No. 1 (USCHO): Boston College
- NCAA Division I men's ice hockey rankings

Two human polls made up the 1999–00 NCAA Division I men's ice hockey rankings, the USCHO.com Division I Men's Poll and the USA TODAY/American Hockey Magazine Poll. As the 1999–00 season progressed, rankings were updated weekly. There were a total of 15 voters in the USA Today poll and 40 voters in the USCHO.com poll. Each first place vote in the USA today poll is worth 15 points in the rankings and 10 points in the USCHO.com poll with every subsequent vote worth 1 fewer point.

== Legend ==
	Increase in ranking
	Decrease in ranking
	Not ranked previous week
(Italics)	Number of first place votes
#–#–#	Win–loss–tie record
†	Tied with team above or below also with this symbol

== USA TODAY/American Hockey Magazine Poll ==
	Week 2 Oct 25	Week 3 Nov 1	Week 4 Nov 8	Week 5 Nov 15	Week 6 Nov 22	Week 7 Nov 29	Week 8 Dec 6	Week 11 Jan 3	Week 12 Jan 10	Week 13 Jan 17	Week 15 Jan 31	Week 16 Feb 7	Week 17 Feb 14	Week 18 Feb 21	Week 19 Feb 28	Final Apr 12	
1	Boston College (15) 3-0-0	Maine (7) 5–0–0	North Dakota (10) 5–0–1	North Dakota (15) 7–0–1	Maine (11) 9–0–2	Maine (15) 9–0–2	North Dakota (9) 11–2–1	New Hampshire (12) 14–2–1	New Hampshire (11) 16–3–1	New Hampshire (14) 18–3–1	Wisconsin (12) 19–6–1	Wisconsin (15) 21–6–1	Wisconsin (15) 23–6–1	Wisconsin (15) 25–6–1	Wisconsin (15) 27–6–1	North Dakota (15) 31–8–5	1
2	Maine; 3-0-0	North Dakota (5) 3–0–1	Maine (3) 6–0–1	Maine; 7–0–2	North Dakota (4) 8–1–1	North Dakota; 9–2–1	New Hampshire (5) 12–2–1	North Dakota (3) 14–3–1	North Dakota (3) 15–3–2	Wisconsin (1) 18–5–1	New Hampshire (3) 18–4–4	New Hampshire; 19–4–5	Boston University; 18–6–6	North Dakota; 22–7–3	Boston University; 22–7–6	Boston College; 29–12–1	2
3	Michigan State; 4-1-0	Boston College (2) 4–1–0	Boston College (2) 5–1–0	Michigan State; 10–1–0	Wisconsin; 10–2–0	New Hampshire; 10–2–1	Wisconsin (1) 13–3–0	Maine; 13–2–2	Maine; 14–3–3	North Dakota; 15–5–2	North Dakota; 18–6–2	Boston University; 16–6–5	North Dakota; 20–7–3	Boston University; 19–7–6	North Dakota; 22–7–5	Maine; 27–8–5	3
4	New Hampshire; 3-0-0	Michigan State; 6–1–0	Michigan State; 8–1–0	Michigan; 10–1–0	Michigan State; 10–3–0	Wisconsin; 11–3–0	Maine; 9–2–2	Michigan State †; 15–5–0	Wisconsin; 16–5–1	Michigan; 18–6–0	Boston University; 15–6–5	North Dakota; 18–7–3	Michigan; 22–7–1	Michigan; 22–7–3	Michigan; 23–7–4	St. Lawrence; 27–8–2	4
5	North Dakota; 1-0-1	Rensselaer (1) 5–0–0	Michigan; 8–1–0	Wisconsin; 9–1–0	New Hampshire; 8–2–1	Michigan State; 11–4–0	Northern Michigan; 13–4–1	Wisconsin †; 15–5–0	Michigan; 16–6–0	Maine; 15–4–4	Michigan; 19–6–1	Michigan; 20–7–1	New Hampshire; 19–6–5	Boston College †; 20–8–1	New Hampshire; 20–7–5	Wisconsin; 31–9–1	5
6	Michigan; 5-1-0	Michigan; 6–1–0	St. Lawrence; 6–0–0	St. Lawrence; 8–0–0	Michigan; 10–3–0	Michigan; 11–4–0	Rensselaer; 11–3–0	Michigan; 15–6–0	Michigan State; 15–6–0	Boston University; 13–6–4	Boston College; 16–7–1	Boston College; 17–7–1	Boston College; 19–7–1	New Hampshire †; 20–7–5	Boston College; 21–10–1	Boston University; 25–10–7	6
7	Clarkson; 2-0-0	New Hampshire; 4–1–0	Wisconsin; 7–1–0	Boston College; 5–3–0	Rensselaer; 8–2–0	Northern Michigan; 12–3–1	Michigan State; 12–5–0	Northern Michigan; 14–5–1	Northern Michigan; 15–6–1	Michigan State; 16–7–0	Maine; 15–6–4	Northern Michigan; 19–7–2	Michigan State †; 20–9–2	Michigan State; 22–9–2	Maine; 21–7–4	Michigan; 27–10–4	7
8	Rensselaer; 4-0-0	St. Lawrence; 4–0–0	Rensselaer; 6–1–0	New Hampshire; 7–2–0	Colorado College; 8–3–0	Colgate; 9–2–0	Boston University; 11–3–2	Rensselaer; 12–4–0	Boston University; 12–6–3	Northern Michigan; 16–6–2	Michigan State; 17–8–2	Maine; 15–7–4	Maine †; 17–7–4	Maine; 19–7–4	Michigan State; 22–10–3	Niagara; 30–8–4	8
9	Denver; 3-1-0	Denver; 5–1–0	New Hampshire; 5–2–0	Rensselaer; 7–2–0	Colgate; 7–2–0	Rensselaer; 9–3–0	Michigan; 12–5–0	Colgate; 11–5–0	Ferris State; 15–9–0	Boston College; 13–6–1	Northern Michigan; 17–7–2	Michigan State; 18–9–2	St. Lawrence; 17–6–2	St. Lawrence; 18–7–2	St. Lawrence; 20–7–2	Colgate; 24–9–2	9
10	St. Lawrence; 2-0-0	Wisconsin; 5–1–0	Colorado College; 4–3–0	Colorado College; 6–3–0	Northern Michigan; 10–3–1	Boston University; 9–3–2	St. Lawrence; 8–3–1	Boston College †; 11–5–0	Rensselaer; 12–5–1	Ferris State; 15–9–0	Colgate; 15–6–0	St. Lawrence; 15–6–2	Northern Michigan; 19–9–2	Northern Michigan; 19–9–4	Northern Michigan; 21–9–4	Michigan State; 27–11–4	10
11	Northern Michigan; 4-2-0	Clarkson; 2–2–0	Clarkson; 2–2–2	Northern Michigan; 8–3–1	St. Lawrence; 8–2–0	St. Lawrence; 8–3–0	Colgate; 9–4–0	Boston University †; 11–6–2	Boston College; 11–6–1	Colgate; 12–6–0	St. Lawrence; 13–6–2	Colgate; 16–6–1	Niagara; 25–5–3	Colgate; 19–7–1	Colgate; 20–7–1	New Hampshire; 23–9–6	11
12	Colorado College; 2-1-0	Northern Michigan; 5–2–1	Northern Michigan; 6–3–1	Colgate; 5–2–0	Boston College; 5–5–0	Colorado College; 8–5–0	Miami; 8–5–2	Ferris State; 14–8–0	Colgate; 11–6–0	St. Lawrence; 11–6–2	Niagara; 21–5–3	St. Cloud State; 16–8–2	Colgate; 17–7–1	St. Cloud State; 18–10–2	St. Cloud State; 18–11–3	St. Cloud State; 23–14–3	12
13	Wisconsin; 3-1-0	Colorado College; 3–2–0	Denver; 5–3–0	Harvard; 4–1–0	Boston University; 6–3–2	Niagara; 11–2–1	Colorado College; 8–7–0	St. Lawrence; 9–5–1	Niagara; 16–5–1	Niagara; 18–5–2	Rensselaer; 15–7–2	Niagara; 23–5–3	Rensselaer; 17–8–2	Niagara; 26–6–3	Niagara; 26–7–3	Rensselaer; 22–13–2	13
14	Colgate; 2-1-0	Colgate; 2–1–0	Harvard; 3–0–0	Boston University; 6–3–1	Miami; 7–4–2	Miami; 7–4–2	Boston College; 6–5–0	Colorado College; 10–9–0	St. Lawrence; 9–6–2	Rensselaer; 13–6–1	Northeastern; 11–8–5	Rensselaer; 16–7–2	St. Cloud State; 16–10–2	Rensselaer; 17–10–2	Minnesota State-Mankato; 18–12–4	Minnesota; 20–19–2	14
15	Miami; 4-1-1	Miami; 4–2–2	Miami; 5–2–2	Niagara; 7–2–1	Harvard; 4–1–0	Boston College; 5–5–0	Ferris State; 11–7–0	Niagara; 13–5–1	Colorado College; 10–10–1	Northeastern; 11–8–2	St. Cloud State; 15–8–1	Lake Superior State; 14–13–1	Northeastern; 13–10–5	Ferris State; 19–13–2	Ferris State; 19–13–2	Minnesota State-Mankato; 21–14–4	15
	Week 1 Oct 25	Week 2 Nov 1	Week 3 Nov 8	Week 4 Nov 15	Week 5 Nov 22	Week 6 Nov 29	Week 7 Dec 6	Week 8 Jan 3	Week 9 Jan 10	Week 10 Jan 17	Week 11 Jan 31	Week 12 Feb 7	Week 13 Feb 14	Week 14 Feb 21	Week 15 Feb 28	Final Apr 5	
		Dropped: None	Dropped: Colgate; 3–2–0	Dropped: Clarkson; 2–4–2; Miami; 5–4–2; Denver; 5–5–0	Dropped: Niagara; 9–2–1	Dropped: Harvard; 4–3–0	Dropped: Niagara; 12–4–1	Dropped: Miami; 8–7–2	Dropped: None	Dropped: Colorado College; 11–11–1	Dropped: Ferris State; 15–11–2	Dropped: Northeastern; 12–9–5	Dropped: Lake Superior State; 15–13–2	Dropped: Northeastern; 13–12–5	Dropped: Rensselaer; 13–14–5	Dropped: Northern Michigan; 22–13–4; Ferris State; 21–16–2	

== USCHO.com Division I Men's Poll ==
	Preseason Oct 4	Week 1 Oct 18	Week 2 Oct 25	Week 3 Nov 1	Week 4 Nov 8	Week 5 Nov 15	Week 6 Nov 22	Week 7 Nov 29	Week 8 Dec 6	Week 9 Dec 13	Week 10 Dec 27	Week 11 Jan 3	Week 12 Jan 10	Week 13 Jan 17	Week 14 Jan 24	Week 15 Jan 31	Week 16 Feb 7	Week 17 Feb 14	Week 18 Feb 21	Week 19 Feb 28	Week 20 Mar 6	Week 21 Mar 13	Final Mar 20	
1	Boston College (26)	Boston College (31) 1–0–0	Boston College (35) 3–0–0	Maine (30) 5–0–0	North Dakota (19) 5–0–1	North Dakota (35) 7–0–1	Maine (33) 9–0–2	Maine (39) 9–0–2	North Dakota (32) 11–2–1	New Hampshire (33) 14–2–1	New Hampshire (33) 14–2–1	New Hampshire (36) 14–2–1	New Hampshire (22) 16–3–1	New Hampshire (37) 18–3–1	New Hampshire (40) 18–3–3	Wisconsin (27) 19–6–1	Wisconsin (34) 21–6–1	Wisconsin (39) 23–6–1	Wisconsin (40) 25–6–1	Wisconsin (39) 27–6–1	Wisconsin (39) 28–7–1	Wisconsin (40) 30–7–1	Wisconsin (27) 31–8–1	1
2	Maine (7)	Maine (3) 2–0–0	Maine (3) 3–0–0	North Dakota (7) 3–0–1	Maine (17) 6–0–1	Maine (4) 7–0–2	North Dakota (7) 8–1–1	North Dakota (1) 9–2–1	Wisconsin (5) 13–3–0	North Dakota (7) 12–3–1	North Dakota (7) 12–3–1	North Dakota (4) 14–3–1	North Dakota (15) 15–3–2	Wisconsin (3) 18–5–1	Wisconsin; 19–6–1	North Dakota (3) 18–6–2	New Hampshire (5) 19–4–5	Boston University (1) 18–6–6	North Dakota; 22–7–3	Boston University (1) 22–7–6	North Dakota (1) 24–7–5	Boston University; 24–8–7	North Dakota (9) 28–8–5	2
3	Michigan State (1)	Michigan (1) 4–0–0	North Dakota (1) 1–0–1	Boston College (3) 4–1–0	Boston College (1) 5–1–0	Michigan State (1) 10–1–0	Wisconsin; 10–2–0	Wisconsin; 11–3–0	New Hampshire (3) 12–2–1	Maine; 11–2–2	Maine; 11–2–2	Maine; 13–2–2	Maine (1) 14–3–3	North Dakota; 15–5–2	Michigan; 19–6–0	New Hampshire (8) 18–4–4	Boston University (1) 16–6–6	North Dakota; 20–7–3	Boston University; 20–7–6	North Dakota; 22–7–5	Boston University; 22–8–7	North Dakota; 26–8–5	Maine (3) 26–7–5	3
4	North Dakota (4)	North Dakota (5) 0–0–0	Michigan State (1) 4–1–0	Michigan State; 6–1–0	Michigan State (3) 8–1–0	Michigan; 10–1–0	Michigan State; 10–3–0	New Hampshire; 10–2–1	Maine; 9–2–2	Wisconsin; 14–4–0	Wisconsin; 14–4–0	Wisconsin; 15–5–0	Wisconsin (1) 16–5–1	Michigan; 18–6–0	North Dakota; 16–6–2	Boston University (2) 15–6–6	North Dakota; 18–7–3	Boston College; 19–7–1	New Hampshire; 20–7–5	New Hampshire; 20–7–5	New Hampshire; 21–7–6	New Hampshire; 23–7–6	Boston University; 24–9–7	4
5	Michigan (1)	Michigan State; 2–1–0	New Hampshire; 3–0–0	Michigan; 6–1–0	Michigan; 8–1–0	Wisconsin; 9–1–0	Rensselaer; 8–2–0	Michigan State; 11–4–0	Michigan State; 12–5–0	Michigan State; 13–5–0	Michigan State; 13–5–0	Michigan State; 15–5–0	Michigan (1) 16–6–0	Maine; 15–4–4	Maine; 15–4–4	Michigan; 19–6–1	Boston College; 17–7–1	Michigan; 22–7–1	Michigan; 22–7–3	Michigan; 23–7–4	Michigan; 24–8–4	Maine; 24–7–5	St. Lawrence; 26–7–2	5
6	New Hampshire (1)	New Hampshire; 1–0–0	Michigan; 5–1–0	Rensselaer; 5–0–0	Rensselaer; 6–1–0	St. Lawrence; 8–0–0	Michigan; 10–3–0	Michigan; 11–4–0	Rensselaer; 11–3–0	Rensselaer; 11–3–0	Rensselaer; 11–3–0	Michigan; 15–6–0	Michigan State; 15–6–0	Boston University; 13–6–4	Boston University; 14–6–5	Boston College; 16–7–1	Michigan; 20–7–1	New Hampshire; 19–6–5	Boston College; 20–9–1	Maine; 21–7–4	Maine; 22–7–5	Michigan; 26–8–4	Boston College; 26–11–1	6
7	Clarkson	Colorado College; 1–0–0	Clarkson; 2–0–0	New Hampshire; 4–1–0	Wisconsin; 7–1–0	Boston College; 5–3–0	Colorado College; 8–3–0	Colgate; 9–2–0	Boston University; 11–3–2	Michigan; 14–5–0	Michigan; 14–5–0	Rensselaer; 12–4–0	Boston University; 12–6–3	Michigan State; 16–7–0	Michigan State; 17–7–1	Maine; 15–6–4	Northern Michigan; 19–7–2	Maine; 17–7–4	Maine; 19–7–4	St. Lawrence; 20–7–2	Boston College; 23–10–1	St. Lawrence; 24–7–2	New Hampshire; 23–8–6	7
8	Colorado College	Northern Michigan; 4–0–0	Colorado College; 2–1–0	Clarkson; 2–2–0	St. Lawrence; 6–0–0	Rensselaer; 7–2–0	New Hampshire; 8–2–1	Rensselaer; 9–3–0	Michigan; 12–5–0	Boston University; 11–4–2	Boston University; 11–4–2	Northern Michigan; 14–5–1	Northern Michigan; 15–6–1	Northern Michigan; 16–6–2	Northern Michigan; 16–6–2	Michigan State; 17–8–2	Maine; 15–7–4	Michigan State; 20–9–2	Michigan State; 22–9–2	Boston College; 21–10–1	St. Lawrence; 22–7–2	Boston College; 25–10–1	Michigan State (1) 27–10–4	8
9	Northern Michigan	Clarkson; 0–0–0	Rensselaer; 4–0–0	Colorado College; 3–2–0	New Hampshire; 5–2–0	New Hampshire; 7–2–0	Colgate; 7–2–0	Northern Michigan; 12–3–1	Northern Michigan; 13–4–1	Northern Michigan; 13–4–1	Northern Michigan; 13–4–1	Colgate; 11–5–0	Rensselaer; 12–5–1	Boston College; 13–6–1	Boston College; 14–7–1	Rensselaer; 15–7–2	Rensselaer; 16–7–2	St. Lawrence; 17–6–2	St. Lawrence; 18–7–2	Michigan State; 22–10–3	Michigan State; 23–10–4	Michigan State; 25–10–4	Michigan; 26–9–4	9
10	Denver	Denver; 2–0–0	Northern Michigan; 4–2–0	Denver; 5–1–0	Colorado College; 4–3–0	Colorado College; 6–3–0	St. Lawrence; 8–2–0	Boston University; 9–3–2	Colgate; 9–4–0	Colgate; 10–5–0	Colgate; 10–5–0	Boston College; 11–5–0	Ferris State; 15–9–0	Rensselaer; 13–6–1	Rensselaer; 13–7–2	Northern Michigan; 17–7–2	Michigan State; 18–9–2	Rensselaer; 17–8–2	Colgate; 19–7–1	Colgate; 20–7–1	Colgate; 21–7–2	Colgate; 23–7–2	Colgate; 24–8–2	10
	Preseason Oct 4	Week 1 Oct 18	Week 2 Oct 25	Week 3 Nov 1	Week 4 Nov 8	Week 5 Nov 15	Week 6 Nov 22	Week 7 Nov 29	Week 8 Dec 6	Week 9 Dec 13	Week 10 Dec 27	Week 11 Jan 3	Week 12 Jan 10	Week 13 Jan 17	Week 14 Jan 24	Week 15 Jan 31	Week 16 Feb 7	Week 17 Feb 14	Week 18 Feb 21	Week 19 Feb 28	Week 20 Mar 6	Week 21 Mar 13	Week 22 Mar 20	
		Dropped: None	Dropped: Denver; 3–1–0	Dropped: Northern Michigan; 5–2–1	Dropped: Denver; 5–3–0; Clarkson; 2–2–2	Dropped: None	Dropped: Boston College; 5–5–0	Dropped: St. Lawrence; 8–3–0; Colorado College; 8–5–0	Dropped: None	Dropped: None	Dropped: None	Dropped: Boston University; 11–6–2	Dropped: Colgate; 11–6–0; Boston College; 11–6–1	Dropped: Ferris State; 15–9–0	Dropped: None	Dropped: None	Dropped: None	Dropped: Northern Michigan; 19–7–4	Dropped: Rensselaer; 17–9–3	Dropped: None	Dropped: None	Dropped: None	Dropped: None	
