= Roger Trudeau =

American hockey player (b. 1976)

Roger Trudeau (born April 22, 1976, in Marquette, Michigan) is an American ice hockey forward.

== Career ==
Trudeau began his career playing at the junior level with the Waterloo Blackhawks in the USHL, spending two seasons with the Blackhawks. In 1996, he began his university level career, playing NCAA Division 1 for Northern Michigan University. Trudeau spent four seasons with NMU, and was a 1999-2000 CCHA First Team selection.

Trudeau began his pro career in 2000–01 with the Florida Panthers' AHL team the Louisville Panthers. He played for the Atlanta Thrashers' affiliate Greenville Grrrowl of the ECHL and Chicago Wolves of the AHL in the following season. For the 2002–03 season, Trudeau made the decision to move to Europe and sign with to the 2.Bundesliga team Bremerhaven REV; he split time with the Riessersee SC in the same league.

== Awards and honors ==
Award	Year
Northern Michigan Bill Joyce Best Forward Award	1997-98
Northern Michigan Bill Joyce Best Forward Award	1999-00
Northern Michigan Most Valuable Player	1999-00
All-CCHA First Team	1999-00
ECHL All Star	2001-02
