= Jordan Martinook =

Canadian ice hockey player (born 1992)

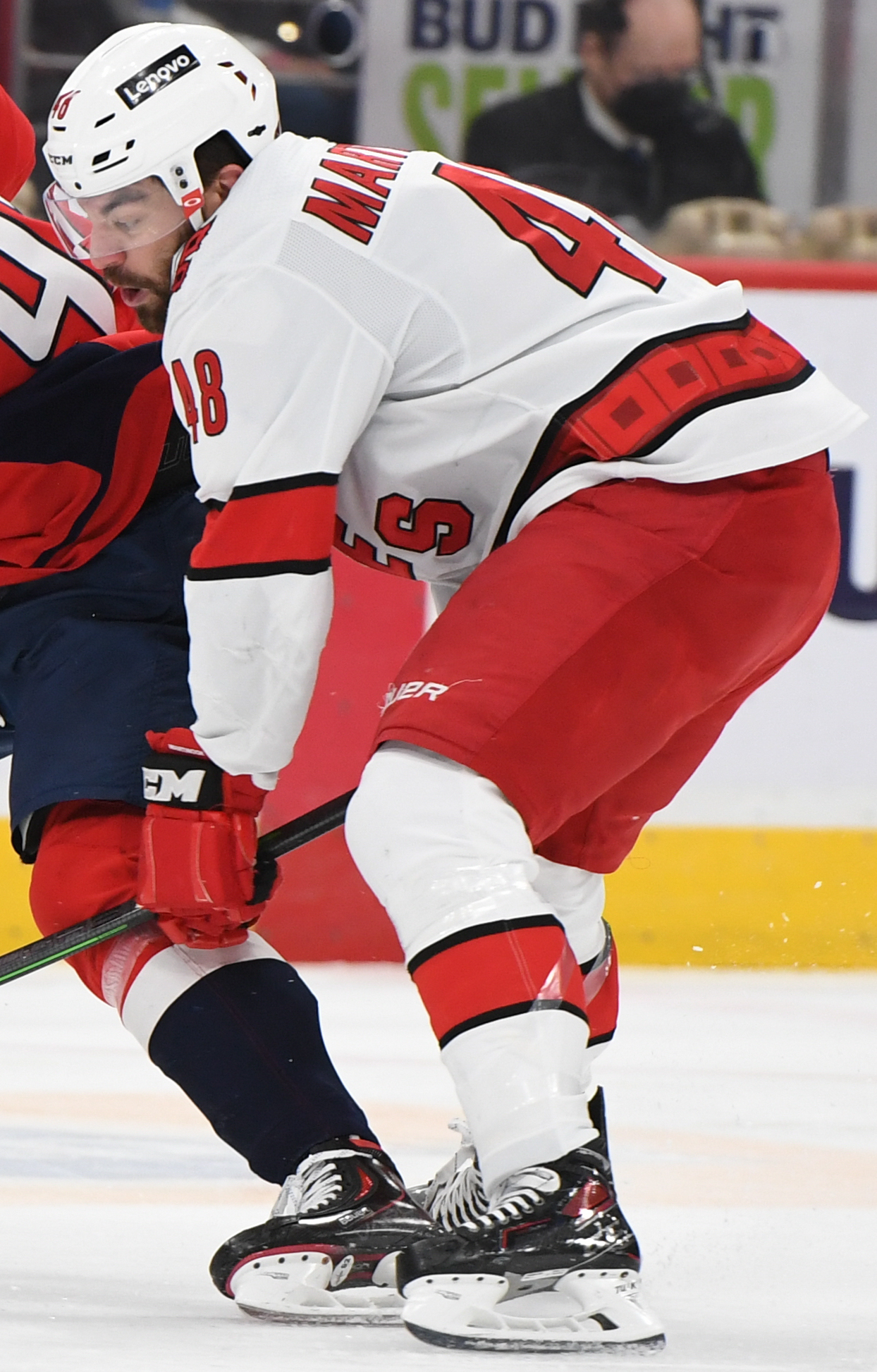
- Martinook with the Carolina Hurricanes in 2022, battling with Evgeny Kuznetsov of the Washington Capitals
- Born: July 25, 1992 (age 34) Brandon, Manitoba, Canada
- Height: 6 ft 1 in (185 cm)
- Weight: 208 lb (94 kg; 14 st 12 lb)
- Position: Left wing
- Shoots: Left
- NHL team Former teams: Carolina Hurricanes; Arizona Coyotes
- NHL draft: 58th overall, 2012; Phoenix Coyotes
- Playing career: 2012–present

Jordan Martinook (born July 25, 1992) is a Canadian professional ice hockey player who is a left winger and alternate captain for the Carolina Hurricanes of the National Hockey League (NHL). He was selected by the Phoenix Coyotes in the second round (58th overall) of the 2012 NHL entry draft. Martinook won the Stanley Cup with the Hurricanes in 2026.

== Early life ==
Martinook was born on July 25, 1992, in Brandon, Manitoba. He was raised in Leduc, Alberta due to his father's oilpatch position, and grew up an Edmonton Oilers fan. After playing with the local Leduc Oil Kings in the Alberta Major Bantam Hockey League, Martinook joined the Drayton Valley Thunder of the Alberta Junior Hockey League. As a 16 year old, Martinook skated in two games with the Thunder before joining them full time in the 2009–10 season. During his rookie campaign, Martinook tallied 21 goals and 19 assists for 40 points through 59 games. While playing with the Kings and Valley Thunder, Martinook also auditioned for the Lethbridge Hurricanes of the Western Hockey League (WHL). After failing to qualify for their roster during their 2008 and '09 seasons, he was also cut from their 50-man protected list midway through the 2009–10 season. As such, the Vancouver Giants picked up his playing rights in 2010.

== Playing career ==
Martinook played two seasons (2010–2012) of major junior hockey in the WHL with the Vancouver Giants, scoring 51 goals and 41 assists for 92 points, while earning 147 penalty minutes, in 144 games played.

=== Phoenix Coyotes ===
On September 1, 2012, the Phoenix Coyotes signed Martinook to a three-year entry-level contract.

On July 20, 2015, the Coyotes re-signed Martinook to a two-year, two-way contract. In his first full season with the club, Martinook scored 9 goals and 24 points in 81 games.

The following year, Martinook recorded 25 points in 77 games. On July 22, 2017, the Coyotes re-signed Martinook to a two-year, $3.6 million contract worth $1.8 million annually, avoiding arbitration.

=== Carolina Hurricanes ===
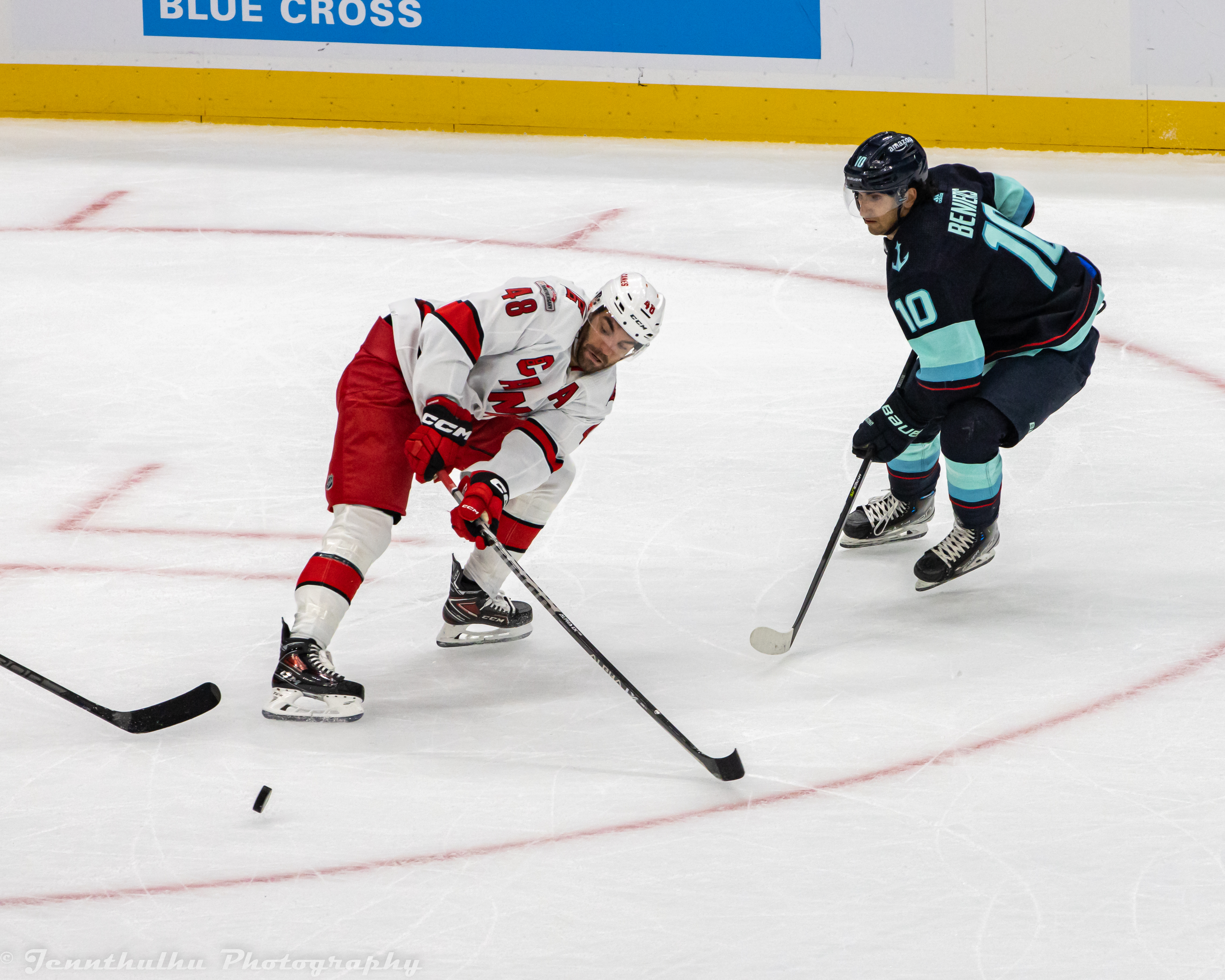
Martinook and Matty Beniers of the Seattle Kraken in 2022.

On May 3, 2018, Martinook and a fourth round pick in the 2018 NHL entry draft were traded to the Carolina Hurricanes in exchange for Marcus Krüger and a third round pick. At the time of the trade, Martinook had tallied six goals and nine assists through 81 games for the Coyotes. Following the trade, he scored his first career NHL hat-trick on November 23, 2018, in a 4–1 win against the Florida Panthers. After recording 10 goals and 13 points through 50 games to rank sixth among Hurricanes skaters, he signed a two-year contract extension on January 29, 2019. During the 2019 Stanley Cup playoffs, after suffering a lower-body injury in Game 4, head coach Rod Brind'Amour revealed Martinook had spent the majority of the season nursing injuries. As a result of his injury, Martinook missed Game 5 but returned to the lineup for the 5–2 win over the Washington Capitals in Game 6. He recorded an assist, four hits, and two shots on goal in 14:25 of ice time. However, he missed Game 1 of the second round against the New York Islanders as a result of reaggravating the same injury. Martinook returned to the lineup for Game 3, where he played on a line with Patrick Brown and Greg McKegg, who also scored the game-winner in Game 4. Martinook finished his first season with the Hurricanes establishing career highs in goals, shots, and hits, and matched his career high in points. He also finished the post-season recording four assists in 10 games. Following their elimination, Martinook underwent surgery to repair a core muscle injury.

Following his first season with the Hurricanes, Martinook was named an alternate captain alongside Jaccob Slavin and captain Jordan Staal. He began the 2019–20 season by recording one assist in four games before undergoing surgery to repair a core muscle injury on October 10. He was activated off injured reserve on November 15, 2019, after missing 15 games.

On January 19, 2021, Martinook was one of four Hurricanes players added to the NHL's COVID-19 Protocol list. During the 2021 off-season, Martinook had meniscal debridement surgery on his right knee but was expected to be ready for the start of the season. While recovering, he was signed to a three-year, $5.4 million contract extension to remain with the Hurricanes.

== Personal life ==
Martinook and his wife Courtney have three children together.

== Career statistics ==
			Regular season					Playoffs
Season	Team	League	GP	G	A	Pts	PIM	GP	G	A	Pts	PIM
2008–09	Drayton Valley Thunder	AJHL	6	1	1	2	0	—	—	—	—	—
2009–10	Drayton Valley Thunder	AJHL	59	21	19	40	48	—	—	—	—	—
2010–11	Vancouver Giants	WHL	72	11	17	28	67	4	1	0	1	8
2011–12	Vancouver Giants	WHL	72	40	24	64	80	6	3	6	9	2
2012–13	Portland Pirates	AHL	53	9	10	19	30	3	0	1	1	0
2013–14	Portland Pirates	AHL	67	14	16	30	48	—	—	—	—	—
2014–15	Portland Pirates	AHL	62	15	28	43	41	—	—	—	—	—
2014–15	Arizona Coyotes	NHL	8	0	1	1	0	—	—	—	—	—
2015–16	Arizona Coyotes	NHL	81	9	15	24	18	—	—	—	—	—
2016–17	Arizona Coyotes	NHL	77	11	14	25	40	—	—	—	—	—
2017–18	Arizona Coyotes	NHL	81	6	9	15	45	—	—	—	—	—
2018–19	Carolina Hurricanes	NHL	82	15	10	25	38	10	0	4	4	6
2019–20	Carolina Hurricanes	NHL	45	2	11	13	22	8	2	1	3	8
2020–21	Carolina Hurricanes	NHL	44	4	9	13	25	11	0	3	3	4
2021–22	Carolina Hurricanes	NHL	59	6	9	15	22	6	0	1	1	4
2022–23	Carolina Hurricanes	NHL	82	13	21	34	61	15	3	9	12	8
2023–24	Carolina Hurricanes	NHL	82	14	18	32	36	11	2	2	4	6
2024–25	Carolina Hurricanes	NHL	79	15	21	36	18	15	1	5	6	8
2025–26	Carolina Hurricanes	NHL	77	12	17	29	35	19	2	3	5	14
NHL totals			797	107	155	262	360	95	10	28	38	58

== Awards and honours ==
Award	Year	Ref
NHL
Stanley Cup champion	2026	
