= 2026 Stanley Cup Final =

2026 ice hockey championship series

	1	2	3	4	5	6	Total
Vegas Golden Knights	5	3*	5**	3	2	0	2
Carolina Hurricanes	4	4*	4**	5	4	3	4
- * – Denotes overtime period(s)
- Location(s): Paradise: T-Mobile Arena; Raleigh: Lenovo Center
- Coaches: Vegas: John Tortorella; Carolina: Rod Brind'Amour
- Captains: Vegas: Mark Stone; Carolina: Jordan Staal
- National anthems: Vegas: Carnell Johnson; Carolina: Adam Lee Decker and Mason Greer
- Dates: June 2–14, 2026
- MVP: Jordan Staal (Hurricanes)
- Series-winning goal: Taylor Hall (3:47, first)
- Networks: Canada: (English): CBC/Sportsnet/Sportsnet+ (French): TVA Sports; United States: (English): ABC/ESPN app
- Announcers: (CBC/SN) Chris Cuthbert and Craig Simpson (ABC) Sean McDonough and Ray Ferraro (TVA) Félix Séguin and Patrick Lalime

The 2026 Stanley Cup Final was the championship series for the National Hockey League's (NHL) 2025–26 season and the culmination of the 2026 Stanley Cup playoffs between the Eastern Conference champion Carolina Hurricanes and the Western Conference champion Vegas Golden Knights. The series began on June 2 and ended on June 14, with the Hurricanes defeating the Golden Knights four games to two, winning their second Stanley Cup championship and first since 2006.

Carolina had home ice advantage in the series due to having a better regular season record. This was the first Final since 2019 to not feature a team from the state of Florida, as the two-time defending champion Florida Panthers failed to qualify for the playoffs, and the Tampa Bay Lightning were eliminated by the Montreal Canadiens in the first round.

== Paths to the Final ==
=== Carolina Hurricanes ===
This was the third Stanley Cup Final for Carolina. Their first appearance in 2002 was a loss to the Detroit Red Wings in five games. They won the Stanley Cup during their second appearance in 2006, where they defeated the Edmonton Oilers in seven games.

During the off-season, Carolina traded Scott Morrow and two picks to the New York Rangers for defenceman K'Andre Miller. They also picked up forward Nikolaj Ehlers in free agency. Finally, they re-signed Logan Stankoven and Jackson Blake each to eight-year contracts. Prior to the start of the season, they picked up goaltender Brandon Bussi on waivers from the Florida Panthers, signing him to a three-year contract later in the season. Sebastian Aho led the team in scoring with 80 points.

The Hurricanes finished first in the Metropolitan Division and Eastern Conference with 113 points via a 53–22–7 record. In the playoffs, the Hurricanes completed back-to-back four-game sweeps against the Ottawa Senators and Philadelphia Flyers in the first and second rounds. In their second consecutive Eastern Conference final, they defeated the Montreal Canadiens in five games. The Hurricanes entered the Final with one loss in the postseason, the fewest since the 1975–76 Montreal Canadiens.

=== Vegas Golden Knights ===
This was the third Stanley Cup Final appearance for the Golden Knights. Their first appearance came during their inaugural season in 2018, in which they lost to the Washington Capitals in five games. Their only Stanley Cup victory comes in 2023, where they defeated the Florida Panthers in five games.

During the off-season, the Golden Knights traded for defenceman Jérémy Lauzon and forward Colton Sissons from the Nashville Predators. They also acquired forward Mitch Marner from the Toronto Maple Leafs, who was signed to an eight-year contract prior to his trade. After three seasons away from the Golden Knights, including two with Carolina, defenceman Dylan Coghlan returned for a second stint on a one-year contract. They additionally re-signed forwards Brandon Saad and Reilly Smith to one-year contracts. Forward Jack Eichel was then signed to an eight-year extension closer to the start of the season. At the start of the season, they signed free agent goaltender Carter Hart, who had been acquitted of his charges in the Hockey Canada sexual assault scandal. During the season, the team traded for defenceman Rasmus Andersson from the Calgary Flames. At the trade deadline, they acquired forwards Cole Smith and Nic Dowd from the Predators and Washington Capitals, respectively. On March 29, they fired head coach Bruce Cassidy with eight games remaining in the season, replacing him with John Tortorella. Jack Eichel led the team in scoring with 90 points.

The Golden Knights finished first in the Pacific Division with 95 points via a 39–26–17 record. In the playoffs, they defeated the Utah Mammoth in six games in the first round. They then defeated the Anaheim Ducks in six games in the second round to reach their fifth Western Conference final in nine seasons. In the Western Conference final, they defeated the Presidents' Trophy-winning Colorado Avalanche in a four game-sweep.

== Game summaries ==
Note: The numbers in parentheses represent each player's total goals or assists to that point of the entire playoffs.

=== Game one ===
June 2	Vegas Golden Knights	5–4	Carolina Hurricanes	Lenovo Center	Recap

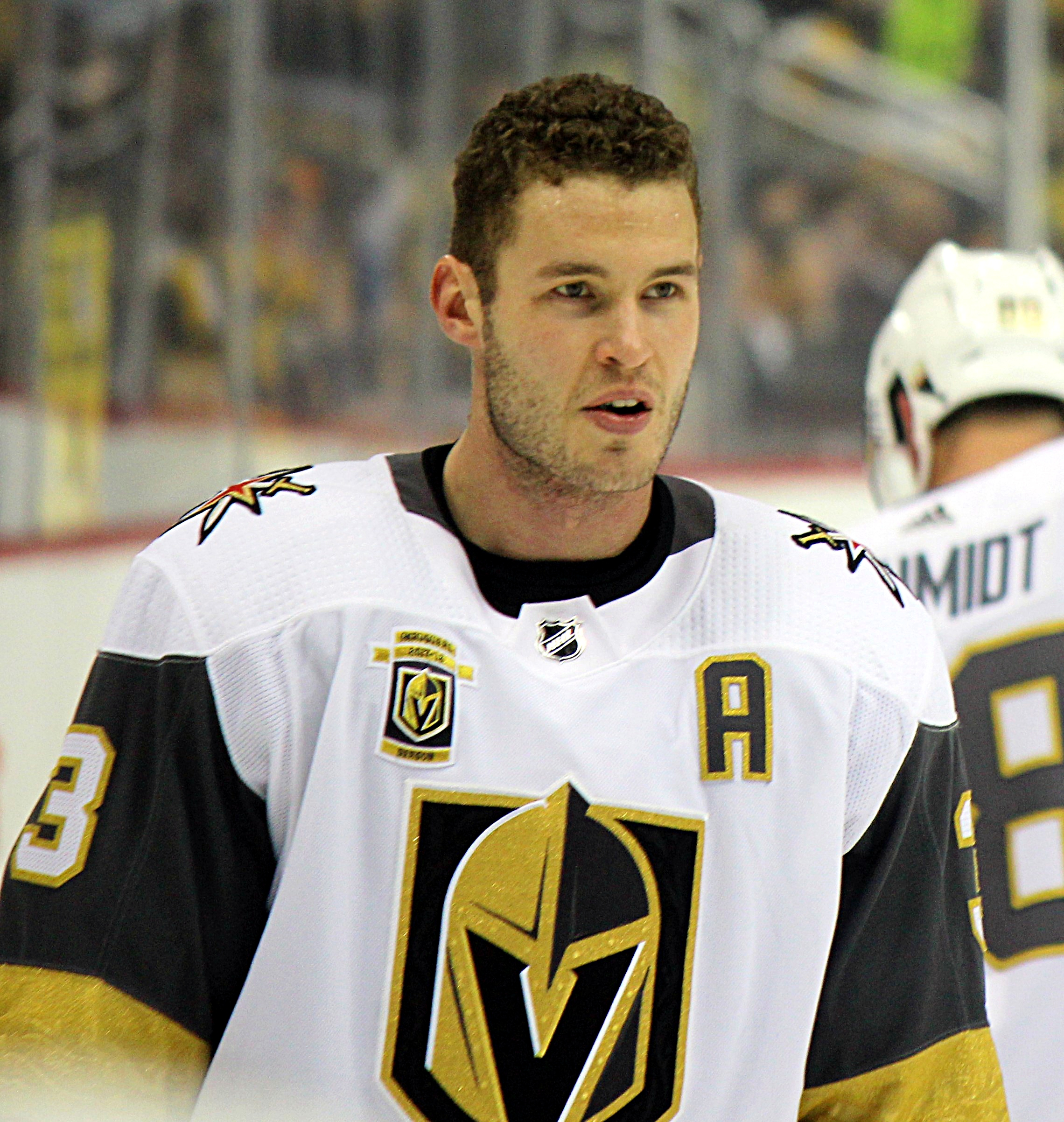
Brayden McNabb recorded three assists in game 1.

In game one, forward Nikolaj Ehlers began the scoring for Carolina in the first period, with the first shot for the Hurricanes giving them a 1–0 lead. Ehlers then gave Carolina a 2–0 lead, scoring five-hole on goaltender Carter Hart on a breakaway. Shea Theodore cut Carolina's lead in half as he fired a wrist shot past the defencemen and goaltender Frederik Andersen. In the second period, Ivan Barbashev scored to tie the game 2–2. After a offensive-zone faceoff, Mitch Marner made a pass to William Karlsson who scored, giving Vegas a 3–2 lead. Carolina captain Jordan Staal later tied the game 3–3, firing a wrist shot past Hart. In the third period, the Golden Knights regained the lead with Howden's tip-in goal. Shayne Gostisbehere tied the game 4–4 for the Hurricanes as a controversial icing call gave them an offensive zone faceoff, and as the Golden Knights attempted to tip the puck away, Gostibehere picked up the loose puck and scored. With 3:24 left in the game Tomáš Hertl scored to give Vegas a 5–4 lead, which they hung onto for the victory.

Game one
Scoring summary
Period	Team	Goal	Assist(s)	Time	Score
1st	CAR	Nikolaj Ehlers (5)	Jaccob Slavin (3), Jalen Chatfield (5)	00:25	1–0 CAR
1st	CAR	Nikolaj Ehlers (6)	Jalen Chatfield (6)	12:08	2–0 CAR
1st	VGK	Shea Theodore (5)	Brayden McNabb (4), Cole Smith (3)	13:28	2–1 CAR
2nd	VGK	Ivan Barbashev (6)	Jack Eichel (17), Brayden McNabb (5)	00:30	2–2
2nd	VGK	William Karlsson (2)	Mitch Marner (15), Brett Howden (3)	04:35	3–2 VGK
2nd	CAR	Jordan Staal (3)	K'Andre Miller (9)	12:42	3–3
3rd	VGK	Brett Howden (11)	Shea Theodore (8), Brayden McNabb (6)	01:21	4–3 VGK
3rd	CAR	Shayne Gostisbehere (3)	Unassisted	11:19	4–4
3rd	VGK	Tomáš Hertl (4)	Colton Sissons (5), Shea Theodore (9)	16:36	5–4 VGK
Penalty summary
Period	Team	Player	Penalty	Time	PIM
1st	VGK	Brett Howden	Cross-checking	13:37	2:00
2nd	CAR	Mark Jankowski	Hooking	07:46	2:00
2nd	CAR	Jalen Chatfield	Tripping	18:35	2:00
3rd	VGK	Rasmus Andersson	Closing hand on puck	06:09	2:00
3rd	CAR	Mark Jankowski	Delay of game (puck over glass)	09:03	2:00

Shots by period
Team	1	2	3	Total
VGK	4	11	8	23
CAR	12	5	12	29

=== Game two ===
June 4	Vegas Golden Knights	3–4	OT	Carolina Hurricanes	Lenovo Center	Recap

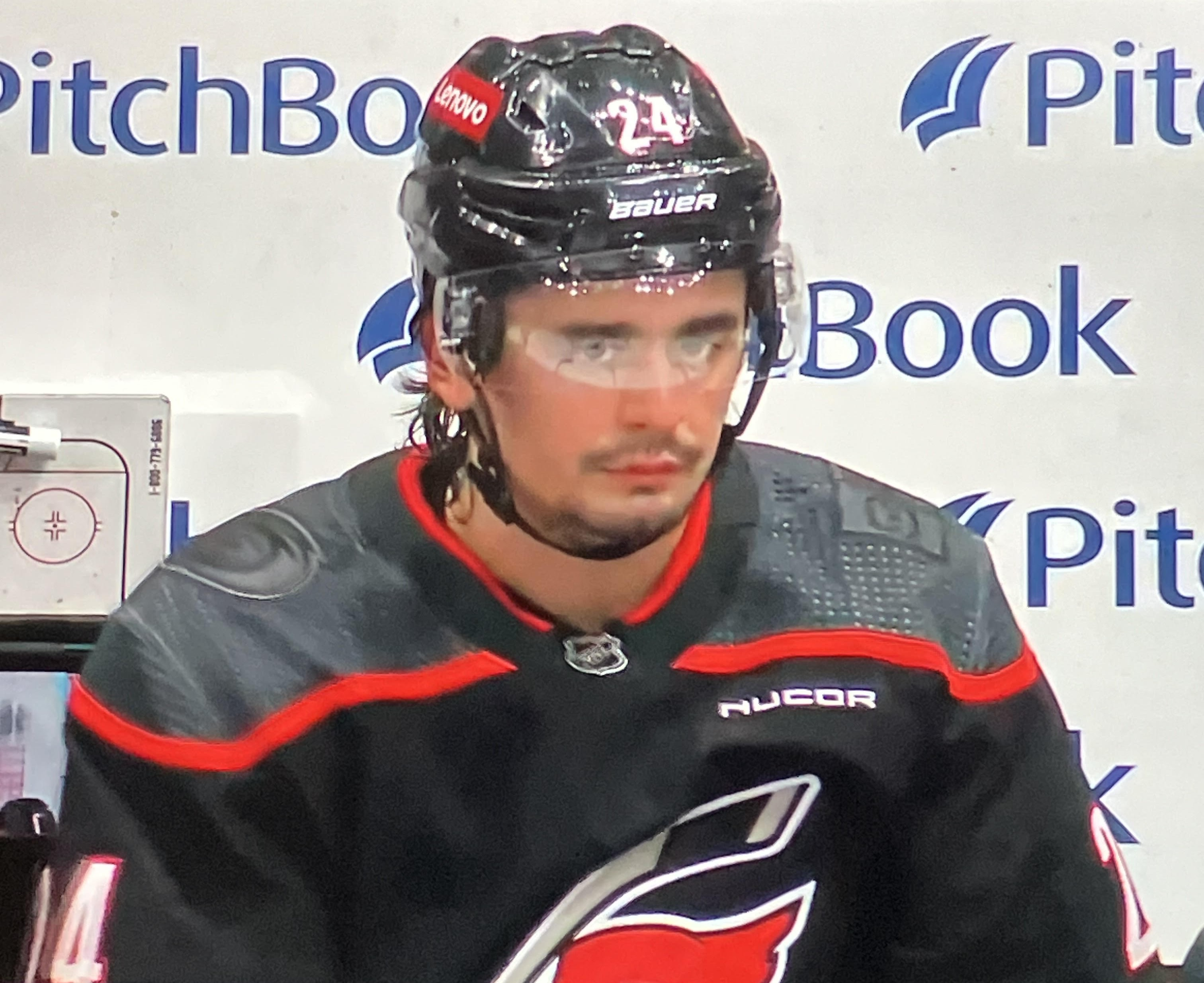
Seth Jarvis scored the overtime game-winning goal for Carolina in game 2.

In the first period of game two, Mitch Marner lobbed the puck out of the Vegas defensive zone and Brett Howden picked up the puck and scored to give the Golden Knights a 1–0 lead. After an unsuccessful power play for the Golden Knights in the second period, Howden scored again receiving assists from Ivan Barbashev and Noah Hanifin. In the third period, the Hurricanes cut Vegas's lead to one as Logan Stankoven scored an unassisted goal, shooting the puck and deflecting past goaltender Carter Hart. They tied the game just over two minutes later as William Carrier passed the puck to Mark Jankowski whose wrist shot got past Hart. With five minutes remaining in the game, the referee blew the whistle to stop play though the puck went into the Carolina net. Vegas challenged the play that no goaltender interference occurred to cause the whistle stoppage. The challenge was unsuccessful. On the ensuing power play, Carolina defenceman Shayne Gostisbehere shot the puck through traffic and Jordan Staal deflected the puck into the net, erasing the two-goal deficit to lead 3–2. With an empty net and an extra attacker for Vegas, Mark Stone scored to tie the game 3–3, sending it to overtime. In overtime, Tomáš Hertl took a tripping penalty and on the Carolina power play, Seth Jarvis scored to give the Hurricanes a 4–3 victory.

Game two
Scoring summary
Period	Team	Goal	Assist(s)	Time	Score
1st	VGK	Brett Howden (12)	Mitch Marner (16)	13:33	1–0 VGK
2nd	VGK	Brett Howden (13)	Ivan Barbashev (8), Noah Hanifin (7)	07:23	2–0 VGK
3rd	CAR	Logan Stankoven (10)	Unassisted	10:20	2–1 VGK
3rd	CAR	Mark Jankowski (1)	William Carrier (4), Eric Robinson (4)	12:46	2–2
3rd	CAR	Jordan Staal (4) – pp	Shayne Gostisbehere (5), Andrei Svechnikov (5)	15:25	3–2 CAR
3rd	VGK	Mark Stone (6)	Mitch Marner (17), Tomáš Hertl (7)	18:39	3–3
OT	CAR	Seth Jarvis (4) – pp	Shayne Gostisbehere (6), Sebastian Aho (4)	03:56	4–3 CAR
Penalty summary
Period	Team	Player	Penalty	Time	PIM
1st	VGK	Dylan Coghlan	Tripping	14:44	2:00
1st	VGK	Colton Sissons	Roughing	14:44	2:00
1st	CAR	Jordan Staal	Holding	17:42	2:00
2nd	CAR	K'Andre Miller	Interference	05:16	2:00
2nd	CAR	Jordan Martinook	Tripping	13:55	2:00
3rd	VGK	Bench (served by Ivan Barbashev)	Delay of game (unsuccessful challenge)	15:00	2:00
3rd	CAR	Jackson Blake	Interference	16:31	2:00
OT	VGK	Tomáš Hertl	Tripping	03:17	2:00

Shots by period
Team	1	2	3	OT	Total
VGK	2	9	14	1	26
CAR	8	7	8	3	26

=== Game three ===
June 6	Carolina Hurricanes	4–5	2OT	Vegas Golden Knights	T-Mobile Arena	Recap

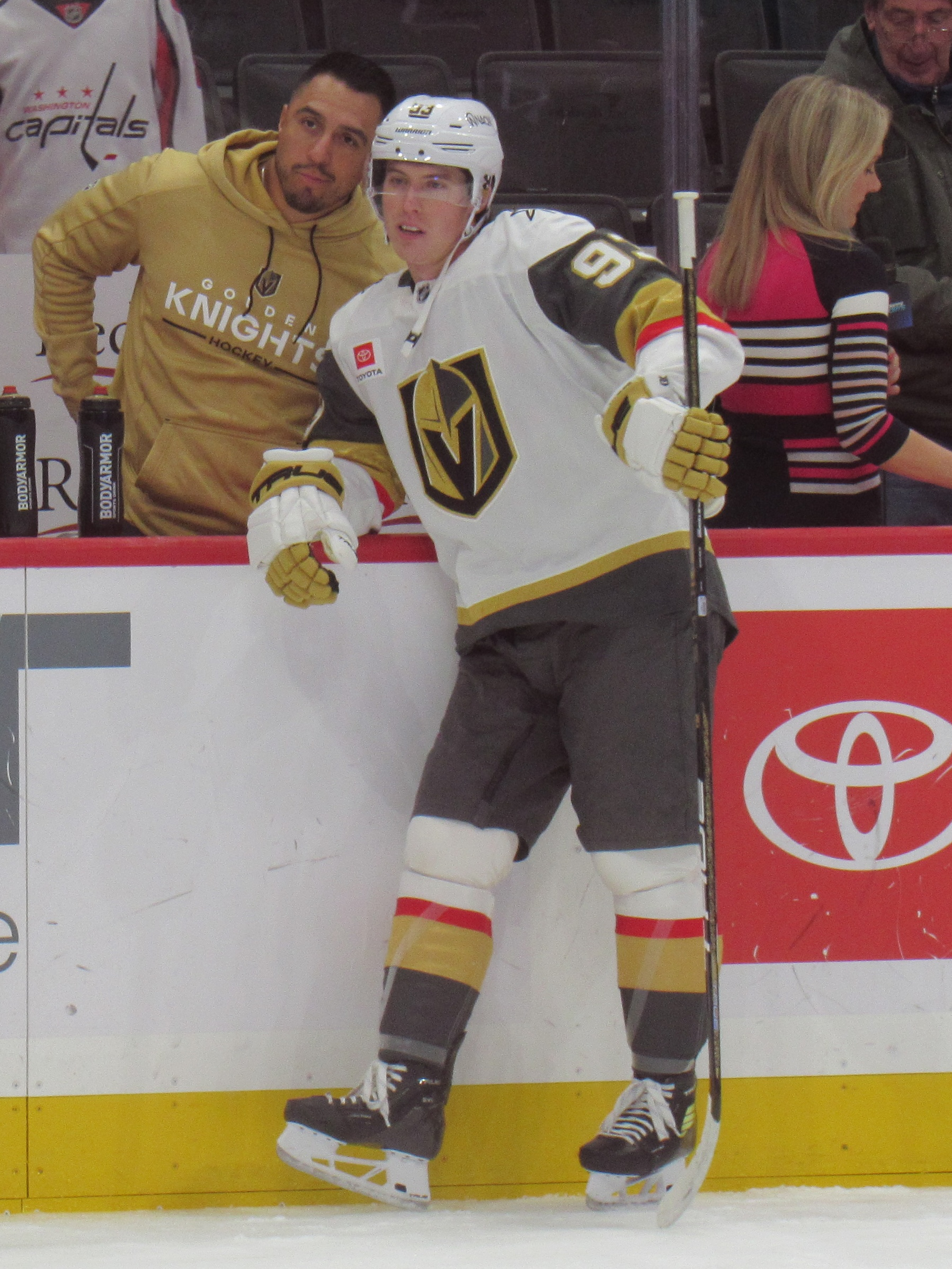
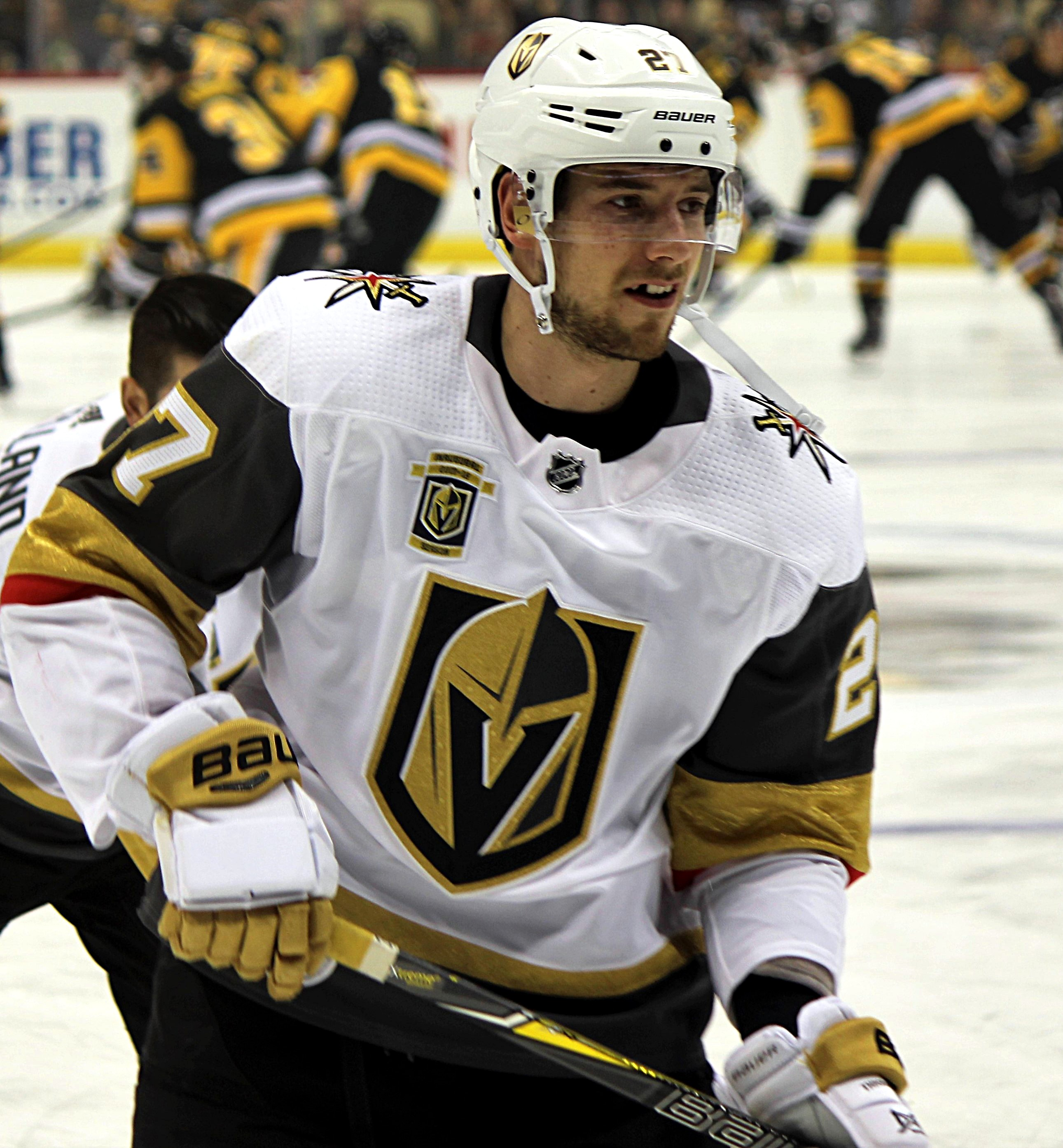
Mitch Marner (left) scored a hat trick, while Shea Theodore (right) scored the double-overtime game-winning goal for Vegas in game three.

The first period of game three remained scoreless with the shots favoring Carolina 7–2. In the second period, two goals by Vegas were challenged, first for an offside call and the second on goaltender interference. Both resulted in the goals being called back. The Hurricanes took a "too many on the ice" penalty, and on the power play for Vegas, Tomáš Hertl scored. Mitch Marner then scored as his shot was deflected off of a Carolina player's stick. Marner scored his second goal less than four minutes later, shooting the puck on his backhand past goaltender Frederik Andersen. Marner completed the hat trick as his third goal came from a slap shot. His hat trick goal was the fastest in Stanley Cup Final history, scoring all three goals within 6:10. The Hurricanes pulled Andersen after the end of the second period, opting to put in backup goaltender Brandon Bussi. Marner had a chance to make it 5–0 on a penalty shot, but was stopped by Bussi. The Hurricanes broke the shutout as they scored three goals within 39 seconds to cut the deficit to one goal. Jordan Martinook scored first firing a wrist shot past Carter Hart. Taylor Hall scored second as Sebastian Aho sent a backhand pass to Hall scoring to put it to 4–2. Captain Jordan Staal then scored off a face-off, making the score 4–3 for Vegas. With 1:42 left in the game, on the power play, Andrei Svechnikov scored to tie the game 4–4. The game went into the double-overtime period, wherein Shea Theodore scored to give Vegas a 5–4 victory and spoil Carolina's comeback.

Game three
Scoring summary
Period	Team	Goal	Assist(s)	Time	Score
1st	None				
2nd	VGK	Tomáš Hertl (5) – pp	Jack Eichel (18), Mitch Marner (18)	10:26	1–0 VGK
2nd	VGK	Mitch Marner (8)	William Karlsson (5), Shea Theodore (10)	10:42	2–0 VGK
2nd	VGK	Mitch Marner (9)	Brayden McNabb (7)	14:32	3–0 VGK
2nd	VGK	Mitch Marner (10)	Tomáš Hertl (8)	16:52	4–0 VGK
3rd	CAR	Jordan Martinook (2)	Seth Jarvis (6), Logan Stankoven (4)	07:03	4–1 VGK
3rd	CAR	Taylor Hall (6)	Sebastian Aho (5), Jackson Blake (11)	07:29	4–2 VGK
3rd	CAR	Jordan Staal (5)	Jaccob Slavin (4), Eric Robinson (5)	07:42	4–3 VGK
3rd	CAR	Andrei Svechnikov (4) – pp	Jordan Staal (4), Sebastian Aho (6)	18:18	4–4
OT	None				
2OT	VGK	Shea Theodore (6)	Brayden McNabb (8), Brett Howden (4)	05:38	5–4 VGK
Penalty summary
Period	Team	Player	Penalty	Time	PIM
1st	None				
2nd	CAR	Bench (served by Andrei Svechnikov)	Too many men on ice	10:16	2:00
3rd	VGK	Cole Smith	Holding the stick	03:15	2:00
3rd	CAR	Sebastian Aho	Slashing	04:04	Penalty shot
3rd	CAR	Seth Jarvis	Delay of game (puck over glass)	12:07	2:00
3rd	VGK	Shea Theodore	Delay of game (puck over glass)	17:05	2:00
OT	None				
2OT	None				

Shots by period
Team	1	2	3	OT	2OT	Total
CAR	7	5	13	6	2	33
VGK	2	14	9	7	3	35

=== Game four ===
June 9	Carolina Hurricanes	5–3	Vegas Golden Knights	T-Mobile Arena	Recap

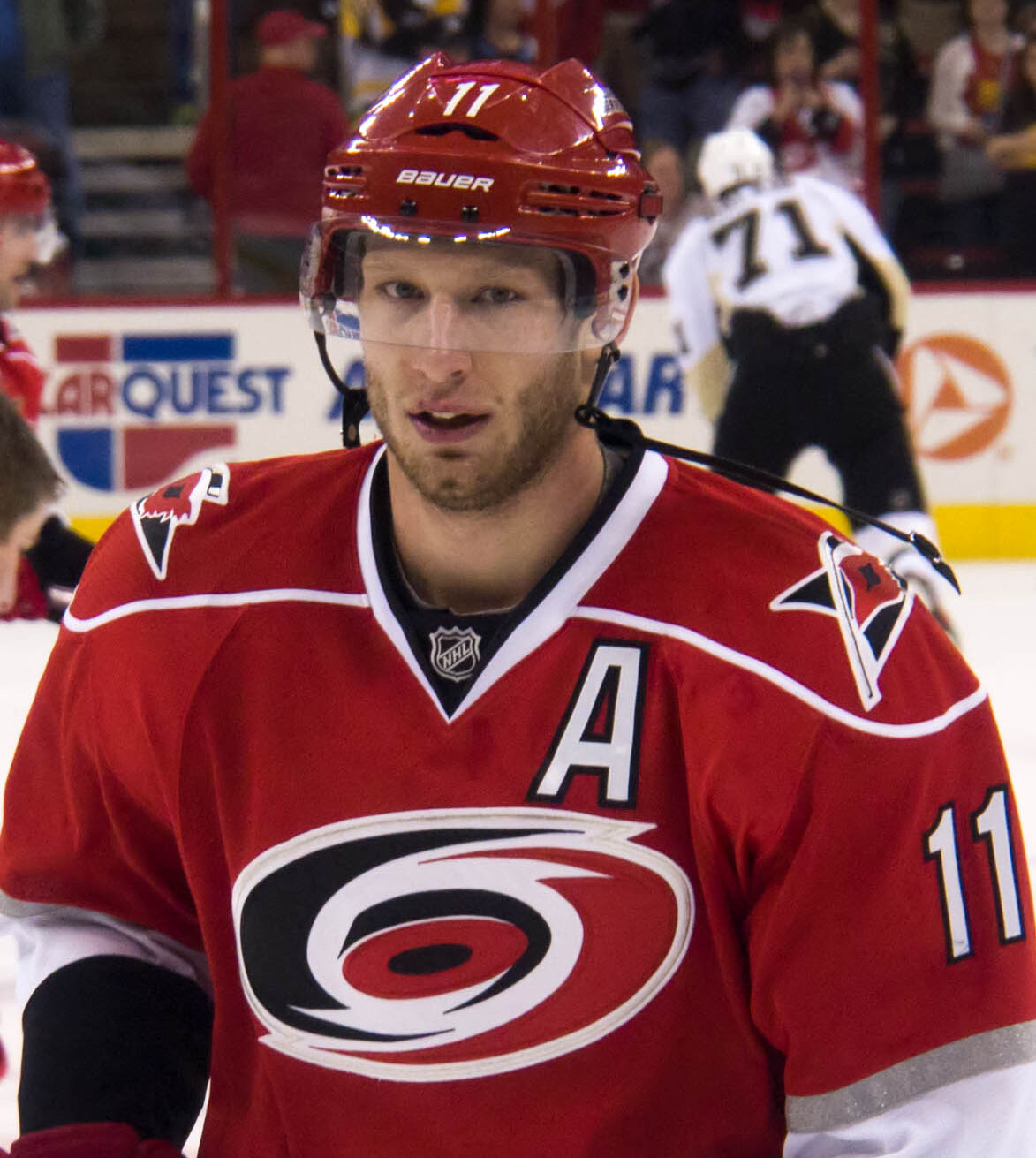
Hurricanes captain Jordan Staal scored two goals, including the game-winner, in game 4.

Carolina started the scoring in game four, with Logan Stankoven scoring 1:02 into the first period. Jackson Blake made it 2–0 for Carolina just as the Golden Knights' penalty expired, accepting a pass from Taylor Hall and firing the puck into the net. Vegas captain Mark Stone put Vegas on the board, faking a slap shot and tucking the puck behind goaltender Brandon Bussi. Later in the first period, Vegas was given a penalty for too many men on the ice; Carolina captain Jordan Staal then scored to make it 3–1. Brayden McNabb attempted a buzzer-beater, putting the puck into the net just as the first period ended, but on video replay the goal was waived off as it had not completely crossed the line prior to the time expiration. In the second period, William Karlsson scored Vegas's second goal of the game, taking a pass from Rasmus Andersson firing a wrist shot past Bussi. The Golden Knights tied up the score 3–3 during a two-on-one rush led by Colton Sissons and Brett Howden, the latter of which scored. In the third period, Vegas gave up the puck in their defensive zone, and while falling down, Staal scored to give the Hurricanes the lead once more, making it 4–3. Nikolaj Ehlers made it 5–3 with an empty net goal, tying up the series 2–2.

Game four
Scoring summary
Period	Team	Goal	Assist(s)	Time	Score
1st	CAR	Logan Stankoven (11)	Jalen Chatfield (7), Jackson Blake (12)	01:06	1–0 CAR
1st	CAR	Jackson Blake (6)	Taylor Hall (12), Nikolaj Ehlers (6)	03:28	2–0 CAR
1st	VGK	Mark Stone (7)	Shea Theodore (11), Brayden McNabb (9)	07:22	2–1 CAR
1st	CAR	Jordan Staal (6) – pp	Shayne Gostisbehere (7), Sebastian Aho (7)	12:48	3–1 CAR
2nd	VGK	William Karlsson (3)	Rasmus Andersson (6), Mitch Marner (19)	04:22	3–2 CAR
2nd	VGK	Brett Howden (14)	Colton Sissons (6), William Karlsson (6)	17:08	3–3
3rd	CAR	Jordan Staal (7)	Nikolaj Ehlers (7)	06:32	4–3 CAR
3rd	CAR	Nikolaj Ehlers (7) – en	Unassisted	19:05	5–3 CAR
Penalty summary
Period	Team	Player	Penalty	Time	PIM
1st	VGK	Shea Theodore	Tripping	01:24	2:00
1st	VGK	Bench (served by Ivan Barbashev)	Too many men on the ice	12:27	2:00
1st	CAR	Taylor Hall	Slashing	17:32	2:00
2nd	VGK	Nic Dowd	Cross-checking	11:30	2:00
2nd	CAR	Jordan Martinook	Interference	14:20	2:00
2nd	VGK	Brayden McNabb	Cross-checking	18:30	2:00
2nd	CAR	Jackson Blake	Interference	18:30	2:00
3rd	CAR	K'Andre Miller	Tripping	01:42	2:00

Shots by period
Team	1	2	3	Total
CAR	14	9	5	28
VGK	6	6	9	21

=== Game five ===
June 11	Vegas Golden Knights	2–4	Carolina Hurricanes	Lenovo Center	Recap

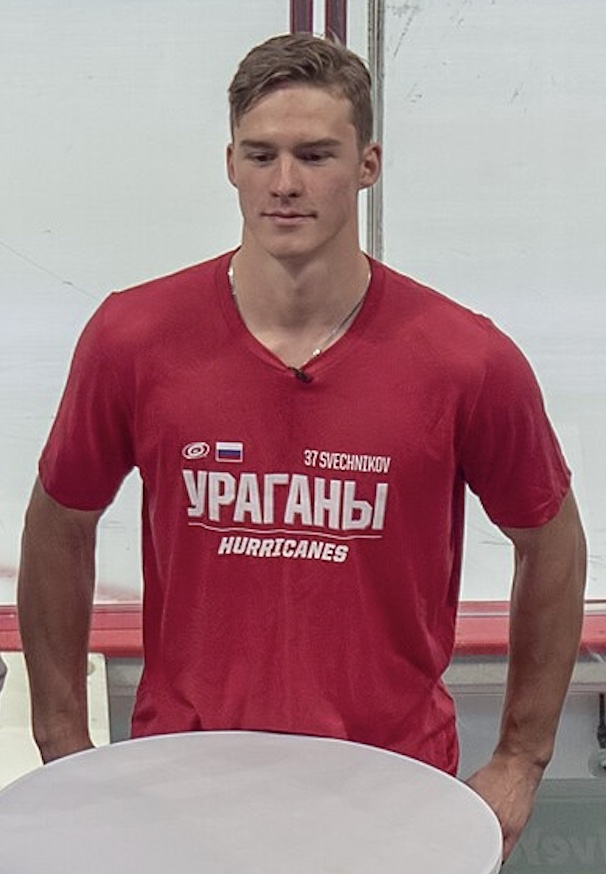
Andrei Svechnikov scored two goals in game 5.

In game five, Vegas started the scoring on the power play. As Carolina forward Nikolaj Ehlers was in the penalty box for shooting the puck over the glass, Pavel Dorofeyev scored for the Golden Knights to make it 1–0. Carolina tied it 1–1 later in the first period as Ehlers passed the puck to captain Jordan Staal who shot the puck past goaltender Carter Hart. Carolina gained the lead in the second period. As the Hurricanes were on the power play, Andrei Svechnikov scored to make it 2–1. Sebastian Aho then made it 3–1 with Sean Walker and Jordan Martinook both assisting. In the third period, the Hurricanes made it 4–1 on the power play as Shayne Gostisbehere passed to an open Ehlers who spun around and backhanded the puck to Svechnikov who scored. The Golden Knights cut the deficit to two goals as Dorofeyev scored his second of the game off of a rebound created by Shea Theodore. However, the Hurricanes stopped the remaining chances by Vegas to go up 3–2 in the series.

Game five
Scoring summary
Period	Team	Goal	Assist(s)	Time	Score
1st	VGK	Pavel Dorofeyev (11) – pp	Jack Eichel (19), Tomáš Hertl (9)	06:52	1–0 VGK
1st	CAR	Jordan Staal (8)	Nikolaj Ehlers (8), Seth Jarvis (7)	11:46	1–1
2nd	CAR	Andrei Svechnikov (5) – pp	Shayne Gostisbehere (8), Nikolaj Ehlers (9)	11:58	2–1 CAR
2nd	CAR	Sebastian Aho (5)	Sean Walker (3), Jordan Martinook (3)	17:51	3–1 CAR
3rd	CAR	Andrei Svechnikov (6) – pp	Nikolaj Ehlers (10), Shayne Gostisbehere (9)	11:08	4–1 CAR
3rd	VGK	Pavel Dorofeyev (12)	Shea Theodore (12), Jack Eichel (20)	13:49	4–2 CAR
Penalty summary
Period	Team	Player	Penalty	Time	PIM
1st	CAR	Nikolaj Ehlers	Delay of game (puck over glass)	06:24	2:00
1st	CAR	K'Andre Miller	Delay of game (puck over glass)	19:54	2:00
2nd	VGK	Jérémy Lauzon	Roughing	08:56	2:00
2nd	VGK	Brayden McNabb	Cross-checking	10:57	2:00
3rd	VGK	Jack Eichel	Tripping	03:23	2:00
3rd	VGK	Mark Stone	High-sticking	08:38	4:00
3rd	CAR	Nikolaj Ehlers	Delay of game (puck over glass)	17:47	2:00

Shots by period
Team	1	2	3	Total
VGK	7	5	13	25
CAR	5	10	9	24

=== Game six ===
June 14	Carolina Hurricanes	3–0	Vegas Golden Knights	T-Mobile Arena	Recap

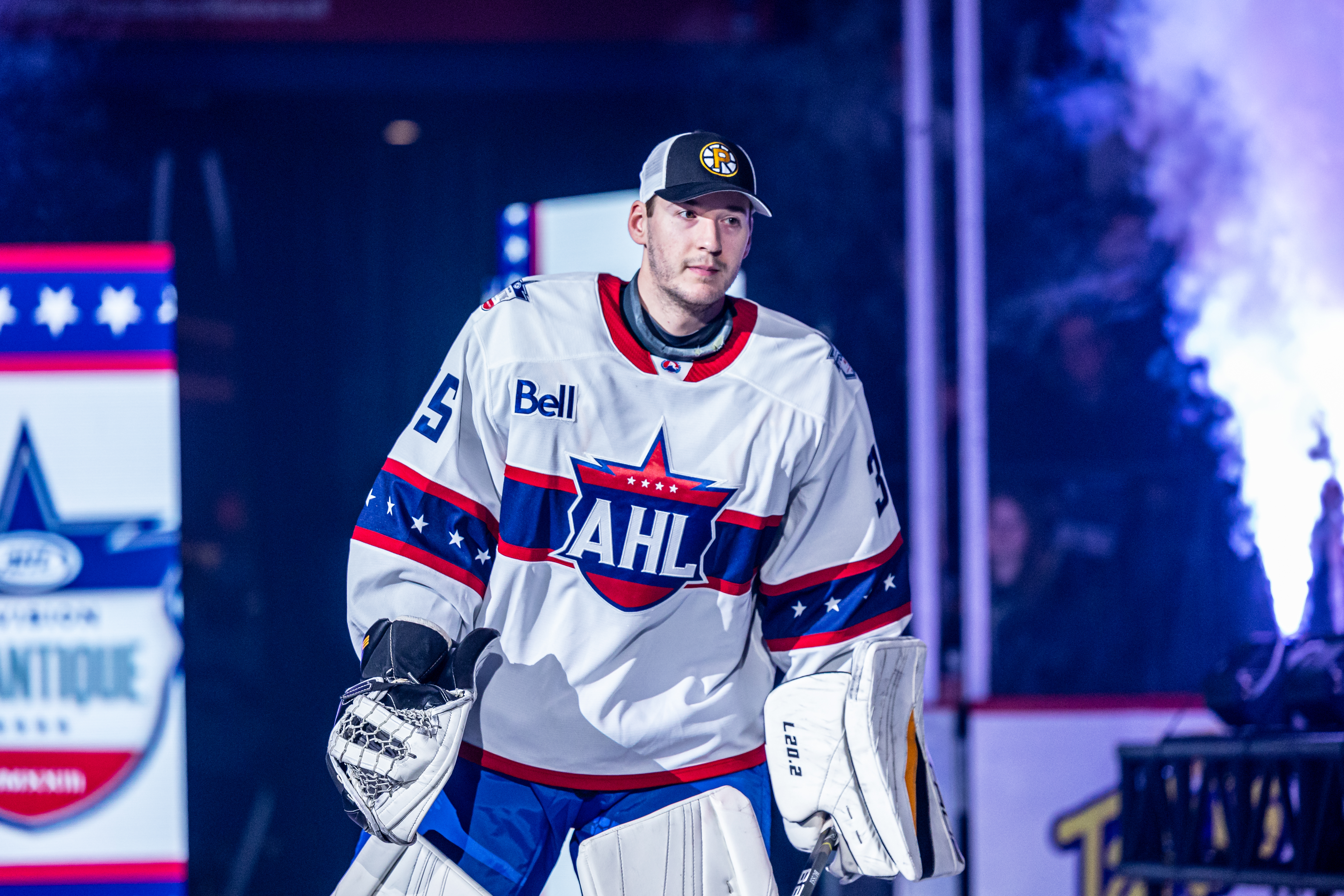
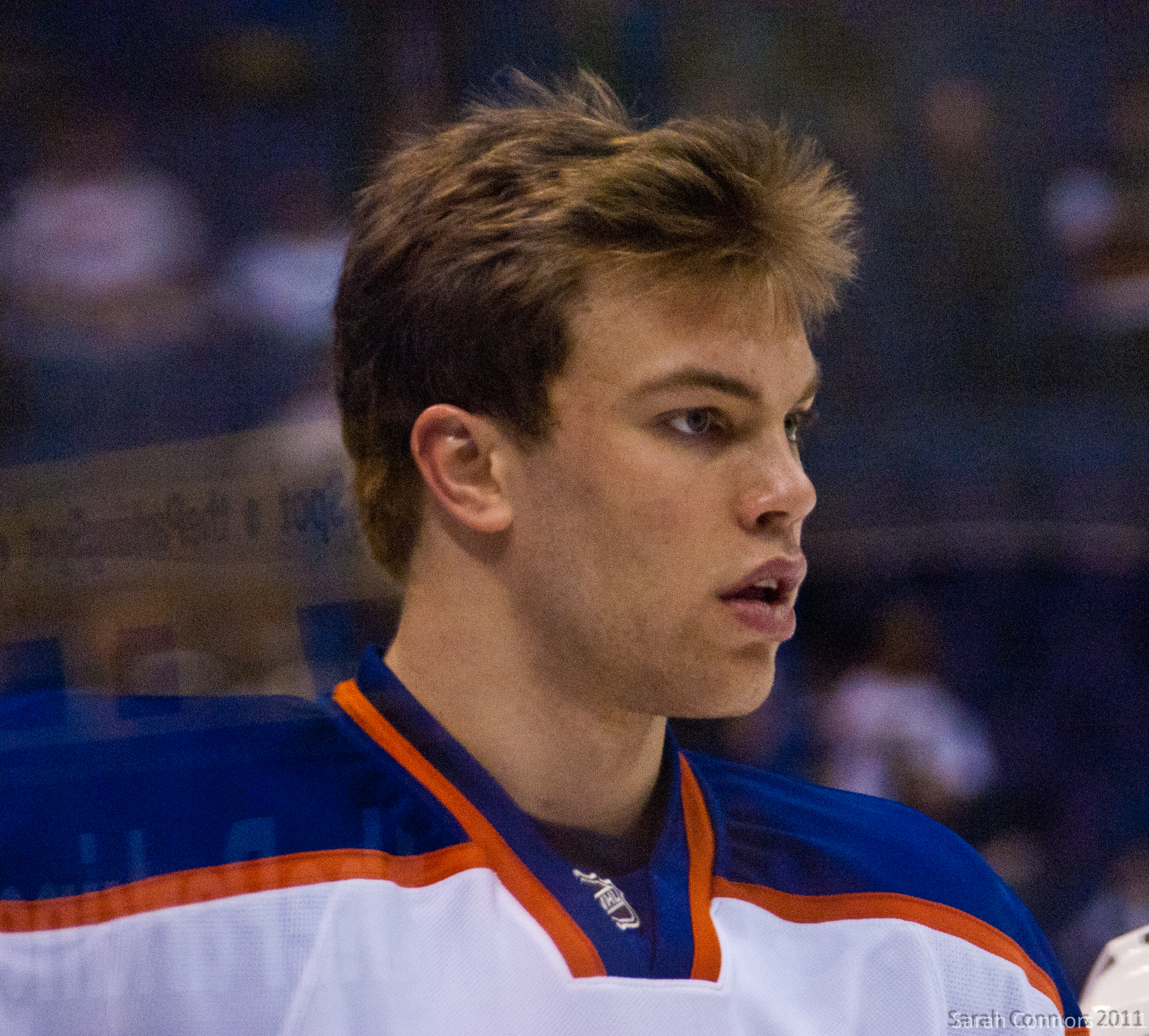
Brandon Bussi (left), shown with the Providence Bruins, recorded a shutout, while Taylor Hall (right), shown with Edmonton, scored the Stanley Cup-clinching goal for Carolina in game six.

In game six, Carolina defenceman Jaccob Slavin dished a long pass to Taylor Hall who scored to give the Hurricanes a 1–0 lead. Goaltender Brandon Bussi kept the Hurricanes at a 1–0 lead through the first period, stopping 11 shots from the Golden Knights. In the second period, the Hurricanes made it 2–0 with Jackson Blake scoring. The Golden Knights were held to three shots for the remainder of the period. In the third period, the Golden Knights pulled their goaltender, but Nikolaj Ehlers sealed Carolina's Stanley Cup victory with an empty net goal to make it 3–0.

Hurricanes captain Jordan Staal was awarded the Conn Smythe Trophy as most valuable player of the playoffs. Rod Brind'Amour also became the first person to win the Stanley Cup as both a former player and coach for the same team since Toe Blake in 1956.

Game six
Scoring summary
Period	Team	Goal	Assist(s)	Time	Score
1st	CAR	Taylor Hall (7)	Jaccob Slavin (5), Jackson Blake (13)	03:47	1–0 CAR
2nd	CAR	Jackson Blake (7)	Logan Stankoven (5)	13:31	2–0 CAR
3rd	CAR	Nikolaj Ehlers (8) – en	Unassisted	18:52	3–0 CAR
Penalty summary
Period	Team	Player	Penalty	Time	PIM
1st	CAR	Jackson Blake	Tripping	10:26	2:00
1st	VGK	Tomáš Hertl	Delay of game (faceoff violation)	10:57	2:00
1st	VGK	Jack Eichel	Hooking	16:12	2:00
1st	CAR	Logan Stankoven	Cross-checking	18:38	2:00
2nd	VGK	Rasmus Andersson	Interference	17:04	2:00
3rd	CAR	Eric Robinson	High-sticking	08:49	2:00

Shots by period
Team	1	2	3	Total
CAR	8	8	7	23
VGK	11	3	8	22

== Team rosters ==
Years indicated in boldface under the "Final appearance" column signify that the player won the Stanley Cup in the given year.

=== Vegas Golden Knights ===
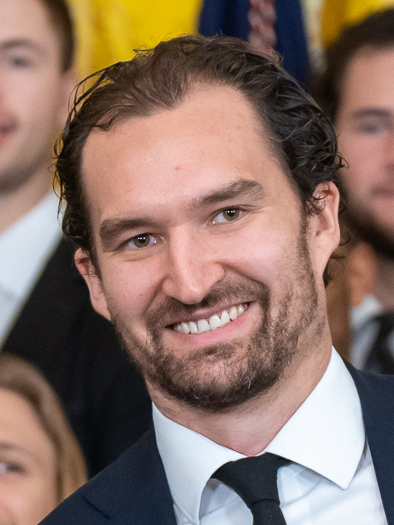
Mark Stone captained the Golden Knights to their third Final appearance in franchise history.

#	Nat	Player	Position	Hand	Age	Acquired	Place of birth	Final appearance
4	(Sweden)	Rasmus Andersson	D	R	29	2026	Malmo, Sweden	first
49	(Russia)	Ivan Barbashev	C	L	30	2023	Moscow, Russia	third (**2019**, **2023**)
42	(Canada)	Braeden Bowman	RW	R	22	2025	Kitchener, Ontario	first
52	(Canada)	Dylan Coghlan	D	R	28	2025	Duncan, British Columbia	first
16	(Russia)	Pavel Dorofeyev	RW	L	25	2019	Nizhny Tagil, Russia	first
26	(United States)	Nic Dowd	C	R	36	2026	Huntsville, Alabama	first
9	(United States)	Jack Eichel – **A**	C	R	29	2021	North Chelmsford, Massachusetts	second (**2023**)
15	(United States)	Noah Hanifin	D	L	29	2024	Boston, Massachusetts	first
79	(Canada)	Carter Hart	G	L	27	2025	Sherwood Park, Alberta	first
48	(Czech Republic)	Tomáš Hertl	C	L	32	2024	Prague, Czech Republic	second (2016)
33	(Canada)	Adin Hill	G	L	30	2022	Comox, British Columbia	second (**2023**)
21	(Canada)	Brett Howden	C	L	28	2021	Oakbank, Manitoba	second (**2023**)
17	(Canada)	Ben Hutton	D	L	33	2021	Brockville, Ontario	second (**2023**)
71	(Sweden)	William Karlsson – **A**	C	L	33	2017	Märsta, Sweden	third (2018, **2023**)
55	(Canada)	Keegan Kolesar	RW	R	29	2017	Brandon, Manitoba	second (**2023**)
6	(Canada)	Kaedan Korczak	D	R	25	2019	Yorkton, Saskatchewan	first
5	(Canada)	Jérémy Lauzon	D	L	29	2025	Val-d'Or, Quebec	first
93	(Canada)	Mitch Marner	RW	R	29	2025	Markham, Ontario	first
3	(Canada)	Brayden McNabb	D	L	35	2017	Davidson, Saskatchewan	third (2018, **2023**)
20	(United States)	Brandon Saad	LW	L	33	2025	Pittsburgh, Pennsylvania	third (**2013**, **2015**)
40	(Switzerland)	Akira Schmid	G	L	26	2024	Bern, Switzerland	first
10	(Canada)	Colton Sissons	C	R	32	2025	North Vancouver, British Columbia	second (2017)
22	(United States)	Cole Smith	RW	L	30	2026	Brainerd, Minnesota	first
19	(Canada)	Reilly Smith	RW	L	35	2025	Etobicoke, Ontario	third (2018, **2023**)
61	(Canada)	Mark Stone – **C**	RW	R	34	2019	Winnipeg, Manitoba	second (**2023**)
27	(Canada)	Shea Theodore	D	L	30	2017	Langley, British Columbia	third (2018, **2023**)

=== Carolina Hurricanes ===
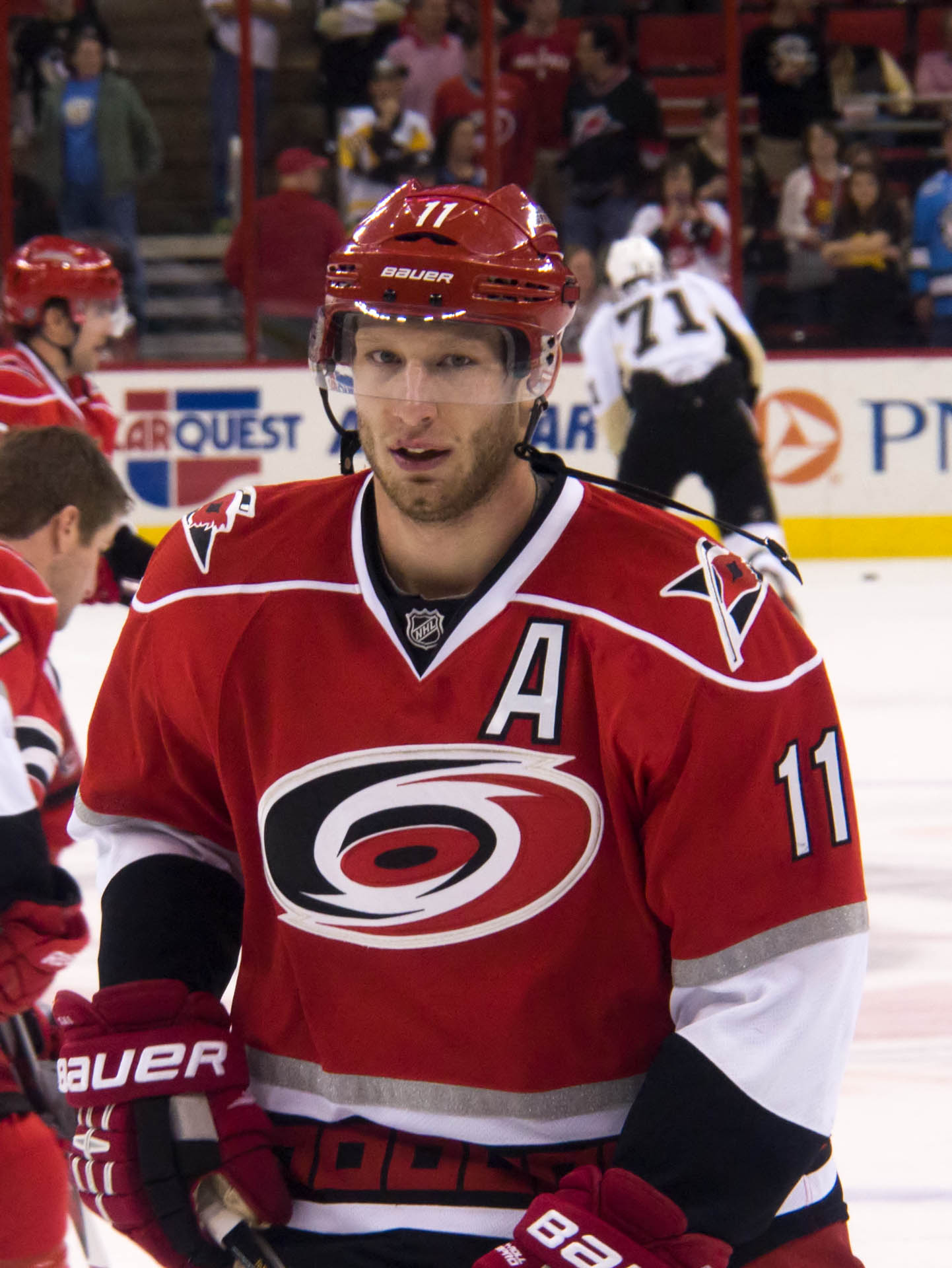
Jordan Staal captained the Hurricanes to their third Final appearance in franchise history, their first since 2006.

#	Nat	Player	Position	Hand	Age	Acquired	Place of birth	Final appearance
20	(Finland)	Sebastian Aho – **A**	C	L	28	2015	Rauma, Finland	first
31	(Denmark)	Frederik Andersen	G	L	36	2021	Herning, Denmark	first
53	(United States)	Jackson Blake	RW	R	22	2021	Fargo, North Dakota	first
32	(United States)	Brandon Bussi	G	R	27	2025	Sound Beach, New York	first
28	(Canada)	William Carrier	LW	L	31	2024	LaSalle, Quebec	third (2018, **2023**)
5	(United States)	Jalen Chatfield	D	R	30	2021	Ypsilanti, Michigan	first
44	(Canada)	Nicolas Deslauriers	LW	L	35	2026	LaSalle, Quebec	first
27	(Denmark)	Nikolaj Ehlers	LW	L	30	2025	Aalborg, Denmark	first
4	(United States)	Shayne Gostisbehere	D	L	33	2024	Pembroke Pines, Florida	first
71	(Canada)	Taylor Hall	LW	L	30	2025	Calgary, Alberta	first
77	(Canada)	Mark Jankowski	C	L	31	2025	Hamilton, Ontario	first
24	(Canada)	Seth Jarvis	C	R	24	2020	Winnipeg, Manitoba	first
52	(Russia)	Pyotr Kochetkov	G	L	26	2019	Penza, Russia	first
82	(Finland)	Jesperi Kotkaniemi	C	L	25	2021	Pori, Finland	second (2021)
48	(Canada)	Jordan Martinook – **A**	LW	L	33	2018	Brandon, Manitoba	first
19	(United States)	K'Andre Miller	D	R	26	2025	St. Paul, Minnesota	first
21	(Russia)	Alexander Nikishin	D	L	24	2020	Oryol, Russia	first
6	(United States)	Mike Reilly	D	R	32	2025	Chicago, Illinois	first
50	(United States)	Eric Robinson	LW	L	30	2024	Bellmawr, New Jersey	first
74	(United States)	Jaccob Slavin – **A**	D	L	32	2012	Erie, Colorado	first
11	(Canada)	Jordan Staal – **C**	C	L	37	2012	Thunder Bay, Ontario	third (2008, **2009**)
22	(Canada)	Logan Stankoven	C	R	23	2025	Kamloops, British Columbia	first
37	(Russia)	Andrei Svechnikov	RW	L	26	2018	Barnaul, Russia	first
26	(Canada)	Sean Walker	D	R	31	2024	Keswick, Ontario	first

== Stanley Cup engraving ==
The Stanley Cup was presented to Hurricanes captain Jordan Staal by NHL commissioner Gary Bettman following the Hurricanes' 3–0 win in game six. All of Hurricanes owner Tom Dundon's immediate family were etched on the Cup despite them holding no managerial positions in the Hurricanes organization, in opposition to established NHL policies regarding engraving of the Cup.

2025–26 Carolina Hurricanes

=== Players ===
Centres

- 11 Jordan Staal (Captain)
- 20 Sebastian Aho (A)
- 22 Logan Stankoven
- 77 Mark Jankowski*
- 82 Jesperi Kotkaniemi †

Wingers

- 24 Seth Jarvis
- 27 Nikolaj Ehlers
- 28 William Carrier
- 37 Andrei Svechnikov
- 44 Nicolas Deslauriers ‡
- 48 Jordan Martinook (A)
- 50 Eric Robinson
- 53 Jackson Blake
- 71 Taylor Hall

Defencemen

- 4 Shayne Gostisbehere
- 5 Jalen Chatfield
- 6 Mike Reilly †
- 19 K'Andre Miller
- 21 Alexander Nikishin
- 26 Sean Walker
- 74 Jaccob Slavin (A)

Goaltenders

- 31 Frederik Andersen
- 32 Brandon Bussi
- 52 Pyotr Kochetkov
- * Played both centre and wing.
- † Did not play or dress in the Final.
- ‡ Exemption granted to engrave the name of a player who did not automatically qualify. (Note: Automatic qualification for a player's name to be engraved on the Stanley Cup: Playing in (for a goaltender, dressing for) at least one Stanley Cup Final game or at least half of regular season games for the Stanley Cup winning team.)

=== Coaching and administrative staff ===
- Tom Dundon (majority owner/governor), Veruschka Dundon (alternate governor) †, Caden Dundon (alternate governor) †
- Dax Dundon (alternate governor) †, Drew Dundon (alternate governor) †, Blake Dundon †, Tagan Dundon (alternate governor) †
- Brian Fork (chief executive officer), Eric Tulsky (general manager), Rod Brind'Amour (head coach), Jeff Daniels (assistant coach)
- Tim Gleason (assistant coach), Paul Schonfelder (goaltending coach), Chris Huffine (video coach), John Stanier (video coordinator)
- Bill Burniston (head strength and conditioning coach), Doug Bennett (head athletic trainer), Koryd Lavimoniere (assistant athletic trainer)
- Nick Maheffey (coordinator, rehabilitation and sports scientist/physical therapist), Mike Maresca (massage therapist), Jorge Alves (head equipment manager), Nick Roy (assistant equipment manager)
- Patrick Budds (assistant equipment manager), Darren Yorke (associate general manager/Chicago Wolves general manager), Tyler Dellow (assistant general manager), Chris Abbott (vice president, pro player personnel)
- Mark Craig (director of pro scouting), Justin Williams (special advisor to the general manager), Mike Brown (manager of team services)

† Hold no position in the Hurricanes organization.

=== Engraving notes ===
- No. 6 Mike Reilly (D) played in 42 regular season games and two playoff games (all in the second round).
- No. 82 Jesperi Kotkaniemi (C) played in 42 regular season games and no playoff games.
- No. 52 Pyotr Kochetkov (G) played in 9 regular season games and no playoff games, but dressed for three Cup Final games. Kochetkov also appeared in three regular-season games for the Hurricanes' AHL affiliate, the Chicago Wolves.
- No. 44 Nicolas Deslauriers (W) played in seven regular-season games and one playoff game (in the first round), previously playing 24 regular-season games for Philadelphia. He did not automatically qualify.
- No. 64 Joel Nyström (D) played in 38 regular-season games and no playoff games, also appearing in 37 regular-season games for AHL affiliate Chicago Wolves. He did not play in or dress for the playoffs and was left off the Stanley Cup engraving because he did not qualify.
- Bobby Gorman, longtime equipment manager, was left off the Stanley Cup. He had been with the team since 1976. The team was then called the New England Whalers in the WHA. Gorman was engraved on the cup with Hurricanes in 2006.
- Brett Jefferson, Bobby Farhnman, and Marc Grandisson, who became minority owners on March 12, 2026, were also left off the Stanley Cup.

== Media rights ==
In Canada, this was the final year of a 12-year agreement in which the Stanley Cup Final was televised in English by Sportsnet, with sub-licensing agreements with CBC Television to simulcast the broadcasts, and with TVA Sports airing the series in French. The series was also streamed on Sportsnet+. Sportsnet will begin a new 12-year deal next season, but as of the playing of the Final it remained uncertain whether the sub-licensing relationships with CBC and TVA will also continue. Shortly after the Final concluded, the CBC announced that it would no longer sublicense NHL games from Rogers, making game six the last NHL game to air on CBC television.

In the United States, the series was televised on ABC and streamed on the ESPN app. This was the fifth year of a seven-year deal in which ABC airs the Final in even years and TNT televises the series in odd years.

Preceded by Florida Panthers; 2025	Carolina Hurricanes; Stanley Cup champions 2026	Succeeded by TBD
