= Eric Robinson (ice hockey) =

American ice hockey player (born 1995)

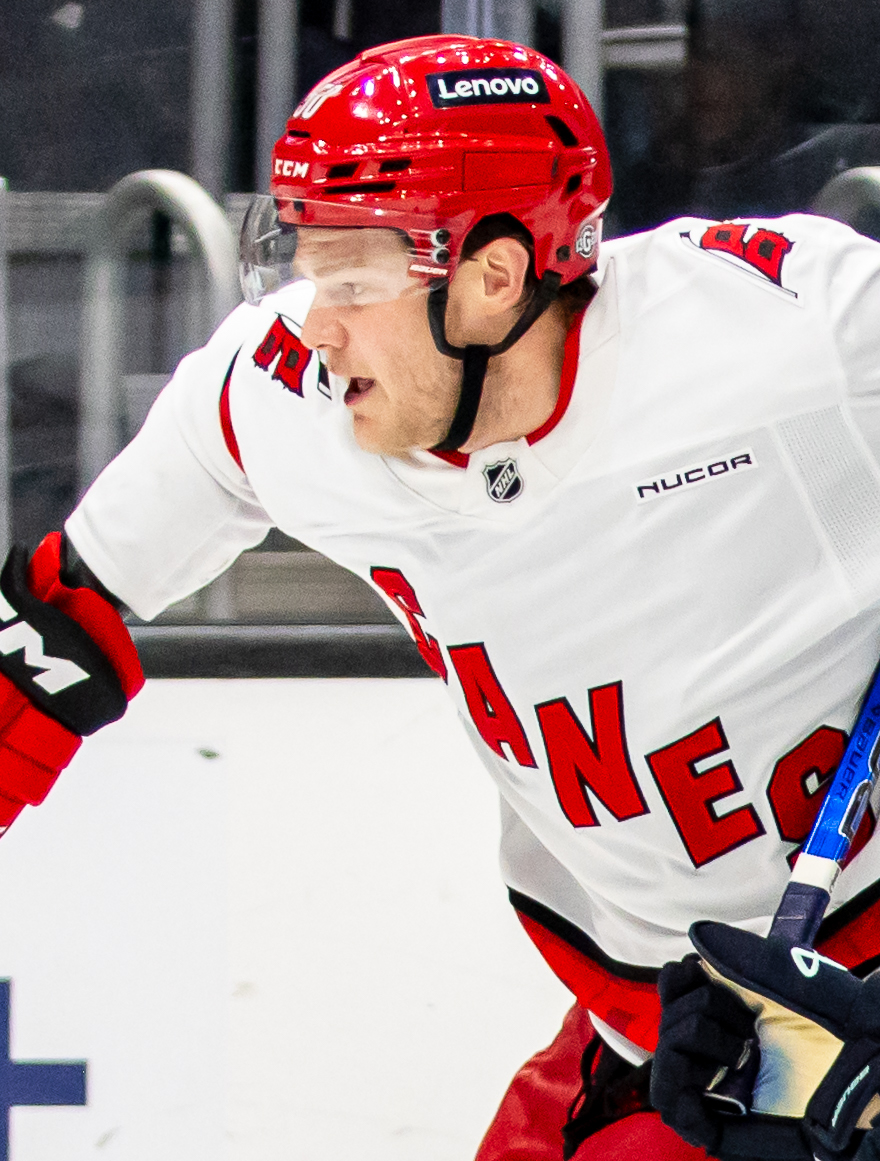
- Robinson with the Carolina Hurricanes in 2024
- Born: June 14, 1995 (age 31) Bellmawr, New Jersey, U.S.
- Height: 6 ft 2 in (188 cm)
- Weight: 220 lb (100 kg; 15 st 10 lb)
- Position: Winger
- Shoots: Left
- NHL team Former teams: Carolina Hurricanes; Columbus Blue Jackets; Buffalo Sabres
- National team: United States
- NHL draft: Undrafted
- Playing career: 2018–present

Eric Robinson (born June 14, 1995) is an American professional ice hockey player who is a winger for the Carolina Hurricanes of the National Hockey League (NHL). Robinson won the Stanley Cup with the Hurricanes in 2026.

== Playing career ==
Raised in Bellmawr, New Jersey, Robinson played prep hockey at Gloucester Catholic High School, graduating in 2013.

Robinson was selected by the United States Hockey League (USHL)'s Dubuque Fighting Saints in the third round, 44th overall, in the 2013 USHL Entry Draft after his final Midget year. He played the 2013–14 season in the USHL before playing collegiate hockey with Princeton University of the ECAC conference.

Robinson's development improved each year with the Tigers ice hockey team, increasing his points totals and role within the team. In his senior season in 2017–18, Robinson was selected as team captain. He recorded a career-high 17 goals and 31 points in 36 games while helping Princeton surprise everyone in winning the ECAC playoff tournament and being crowned 2017–18 champions, also earning a trip to the NCAA tournament.

Having been unselected in any NHL entry draft, Robinson attracted considerable NHL interest as a free agent and signed a two-year, entry-level contract with the Columbus Blue Jackets on March 27, 2018. With the intention to immediately burn a year off his contract, Robinson was added to the Blue Jackets' roster and made his NHL debut in the final game of the 2017–18 regular season, a 4–2 defeat to the Nashville Predators on April 7, 2018.

During the 2019–20 season, on November 12, 2019, Robinson scored his first NHL career goal with the Blue Jackets against Carey Price of the Montreal Canadiens.

In the 2022–23 season, Robinson scored his first career hat trick on February 28, 2023 against Craig Anderson and the Buffalo Sabres. He completed the season posting a career high 12 goals and adding 12 assists for 24 points through 72 regular season games.

In his seventh season with the Blue Jackets in 2023–24, Robinson was demoted to the AHL for the first time in four years after clearing waivers, and made 9 appearances with the Cleveland Monsters, before returning to Columbus. Contributing 1 goal through 7 games, Robinson was traded by the Blue Jackets to the Buffalo Sabres in exchange for a conditional 2025 seventh-round selection on December 6, 2023. He remained on the Sabres roster for the duration of the season, contributing with 2 goals and 9 points through 40 regular season appearances in a bottom-six checking line role.

As a free agent from the Sabres, Robinson was signed at the opening of free agency to a one-year, $950,000 contract for the 2024–25 season with the Carolina Hurricanes on July 1, 2024. Carolina resigned Robinson to a 4-year deal, 6.8M contract on June 20, 2025 that expires in the 2028-29 season

== Personal life ==
Robinson's brother, Buddy, is also a former professional ice hockey player who had previously played in the NHL with the Ottawa Senators, Calgary Flames, Anaheim Ducks and Chicago Blackhawks.

== Career statistics ==
Medal record

Men's ice hockey

Representing the United States

World Championships
| Bronze medal – third place | 2021 Latvia | |

=== Regular season and playoffs ===
| | | | Regular season | | | | | Playoffs |
| Season | Team | League | GP | G | A | Pts | PIM | GP | G | A | Pts | PIM |
|---|---|---|---|---|---|---|---|---|---|---|---|---|
| 2010–11 | Team Comcast 16U AAA | AYHL | 20 | 8 | 13 | 21 | 4 | — | — | — | — | — |
| 2011–12 | Team Comcast 16U AAA | AYHL | 20 | 7 | 8 | 15 | 8 | — | — | — | — | — |
| 2011–12 | Team Comcast 16U AAA | T1EHL | 40 | 6 | 10 | 16 | 8 | — | — | — | — | — |
| 2012–13 | Team Comcast 18U AAA | T1EHL | 40 | 16 | 26 | 42 | 0 | — | — | — | — | — |
| 2012–13 | Team Comcast 18U AAA | AYHL | 14 | 4 | 9 | 13 | 15 | — | — | — | — | — |
| 2013–14 | Dubuque Fighting Saints | USHL | 50 | 8 | 16 | 24 | 24 | 3 | 0 | 0 | 0 | 0 |
| 2014–15 | Princeton University | ECAC | 27 | 2 | 2 | 4 | 8 | — | — | — | — | — |
| 2015–16 | Princeton University | ECAC | 31 | 7 | 4 | 11 | 10 | — | — | — | — | — |
| 2016–17 | Princeton University | ECAC | 34 | 13 | 8 | 21 | 12 | — | — | — | — | — |
| 2017–18 | Princeton University | ECAC | 36 | 17 | 14 | 31 | 44 | — | — | — | — | — |
| 2017–18 | Columbus Blue Jackets | NHL | 1 | 0 | 0 | 0 | 0 | — | — | — | — | — |
| 2018–19 | Cleveland Monsters | AHL | 45 | 12 | 12 | 24 | 15 | — | — | — | — | — |
| 2018–19 | Columbus Blue Jackets | NHL | 13 | 0 | 0 | 0 | 0 | — | — | — | — | — |
| 2019–20 | Cleveland Monsters | AHL | 14 | 3 | 2 | 5 | 6 | — | — | — | — | — |
| 2019–20 | Columbus Blue Jackets | NHL | 50 | 7 | 5 | 12 | 12 | 10 | 1 | 0 | 1 | 0 |
| 2020–21 | Columbus Blue Jackets | NHL | 56 | 8 | 10 | 18 | 4 | — | — | — | — | — |
| 2021–22 | Columbus Blue Jackets | NHL | 67 | 10 | 17 | 27 | 18 | — | — | — | — | — |
| 2022–23 | Columbus Blue Jackets | NHL | 72 | 12 | 12 | 24 | 6 | — | — | — | — | — |
| 2023–24 | Columbus Blue Jackets | NHL | 7 | 1 | 0 | 1 | 0 | — | — | — | — | — |
| 2023–24 | Cleveland Monsters | AHL | 9 | 1 | 3 | 4 | 0 | — | — | — | — | — |
| 2023–24 | Buffalo Sabres | NHL | 40 | 2 | 7 | 9 | 19 | — | — | — | — | — |
| 2024–25 | Carolina Hurricanes | NHL | 82 | 14 | 18 | 32 | 10 | 15 | 1 | 2 | 3 | 2 |
| 2025–26 | Carolina Hurricanes | NHL | 67 | 12 | 6 | 18 | 8 | 19 | 3 | 5 | 8 | 16 |
| NHL totals | | | 455 | 66 | 75 | 141 | 77 | 44 | 5 | 7 | 12 | 18 |

=== International ===
| Year | Team | Event | Result | GP | G | A | Pts | PIM |
|---|---|---|---|---|---|---|---|---|
| 2021 | United States | WC | 3rd place, bronze medalist(s) | 10 | 0 | 3 | 3 | 2 |
| Senior totals | | | | 10 | 0 | 3 | 3 | 2 |

== Awards and honors ==
| Award | Year |
College
| ECAC All-Tournament Team | 2018 |
NHL
| Stanley Cup champion | 2026 |
