= Seth Jarvis =

Canadian ice hockey player (born 2002)

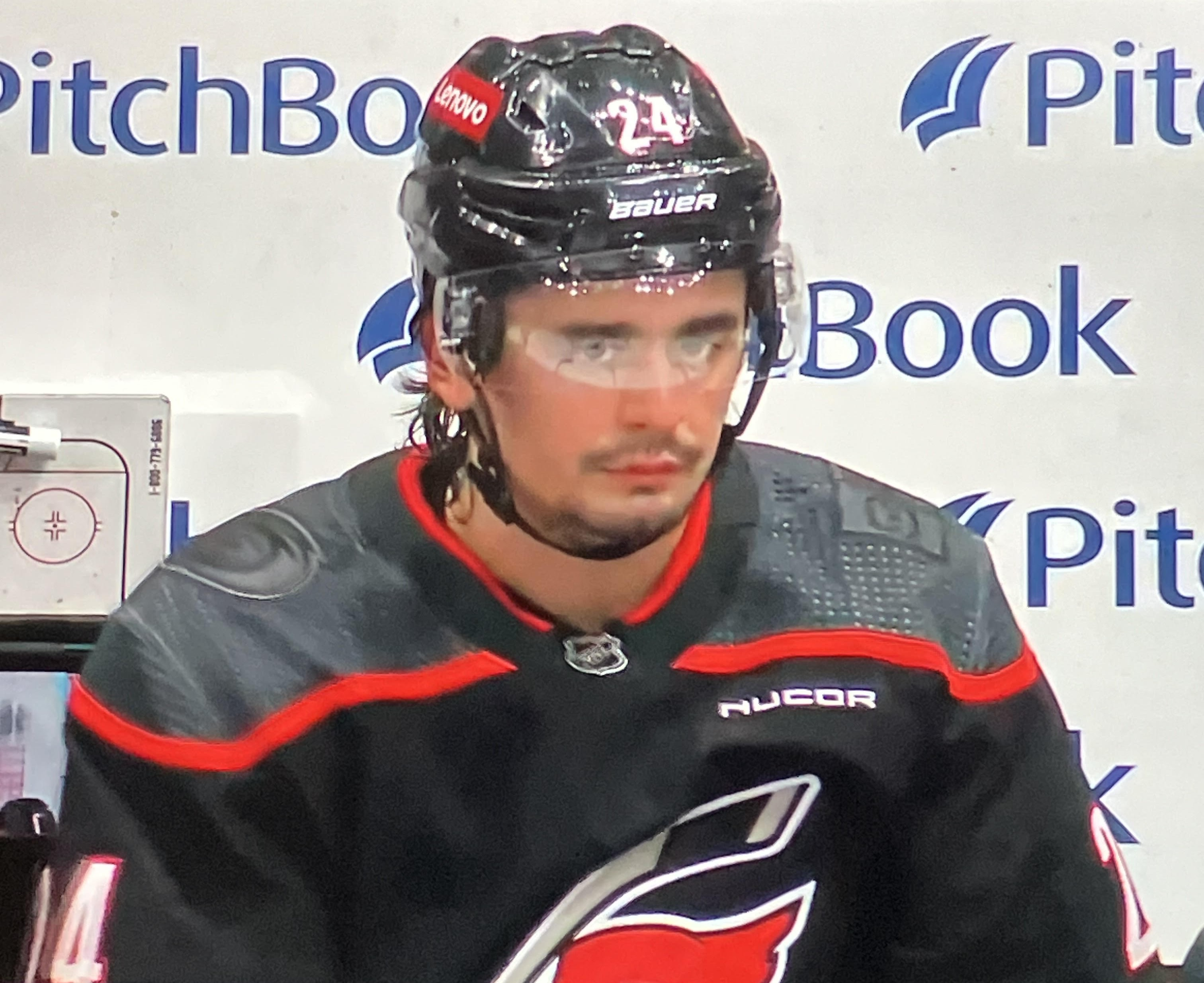
- Jarvis with the Carolina Hurricanes in 2024
- Born: February 1, 2002 (age 24) Winnipeg, Manitoba, Canada
- Height: 5 ft 10 in (178 cm)
- Weight: 180 lb (82 kg; 12 st 12 lb)
- Position: Forward
- Shoots: Right
- NHL team: Carolina Hurricanes
- National team: Canada
- NHL draft: 13th overall, 2020; Carolina Hurricanes
- Playing career: 2021–present

Seth Jarvis (born February 1, 2002) is a Canadian professional ice hockey player who is a forward for the Carolina Hurricanes of the National Hockey League (NHL). Selected 13th overall by Carolina in the 2020 NHL entry draft, Jarvis made his NHL debut in 2021 and won the Stanley Cup with the Hurricanes in 2026. Internationally, Jarvis has represented Canada, winning the 2025 4 Nations Face-Off and a silver medal at the 2026 Winter Olympics.

== Early life ==
Jarvis was born on February 1, 2002, in Winnipeg to parents Ray and Tracey. Growing up, Jarvis played with the Tuxedo Lightning, Assiniboine Park Rangers, and the Winnipeg Monarchs. He attended Shaftesbury High School.

== Playing career ==
On October 6, 2020, Jarvis was selected by the Carolina Hurricanes with the 13th overall pick in the 2020 NHL entry draft. The draft choice used to select Jarvis was acquired along with Patrick Marleau and a seventh-round draft pick from the Toronto Maple Leafs in exchange for a sixth-round draft pick, in a trade that gave Toronto salary cap relief. On December 28, Jarvis signed a three-year, entry-level contract with the Hurricanes.

Jarvis made his NHL debut on October 31, 2021, and recorded his first NHL point. On November 3, in his second NHL game, Jarvis scored his first career NHL goal against Marc-André Fleury of the Chicago Blackhawks. He finished his rookie season with 17 goals and 23 assists for 40 points in 68 games played.

On February 16, 2023, Jarvis recorded his first career hat trick in a 6–2 victory against the Montreal Canadiens.

On August 31, 2024, Jarvis signed an eight-year, $63.2 million contract extension with the Hurricanes.

On November 28, 2025, during the 2025–26 season, Jarvis recorded his second career hat trick in a 5–1 victory against the Winnipeg Jets. On March 28, 2026, Jarvis reached the 30-goal mark for the third consecutive season during a game against the New Jersey Devils, becoming the sixth player in franchise history to achieve that streak, joining Eric Staal, Blaine Stoughton, Sebastian Aho, Jeff O'Neill and Sylvain Turgeon. He was also the fourth player in franchise history to reach the milestone at age 24 or younger. On June 14, 2026, Jarvis won the Stanley Cup when the Hurricanes defeated the Vegas Golden Knights in six games in the 2026 Stanley Cup Final.

Following the 2026 playoffs, Jarvis underwent shoulder surgery to repair a torn labrum and rotator cuff. Hurricanes general manager Eric Tulsky said Jarvis was expected to miss the start of the 2026–27 NHL season, with a projected recovery timeline of four to six months.

== International play ==
Medal record

Men's ice hockey

Representing Canada

Olympic Games
Silver medal – second place	2026 Milano Cortina	

4 Nations Face-Off
Winner	2025 Canada/United States	

Hlinka Gretzky Cup
Silver medal – second place	2019 Slovakia	

Jarvis represented Canada Red at the 2018 World U-17 Hockey Challenge, recording five points in six games. He later represented Canada at the 2019 Hlinka Gretzky Cup, where Canada won silver.

Jarvis was named to Canada's roster for the 2025 4 Nations Face-Off. He recorded one assist in three games as Canada won the tournament, defeating the United States 3–2 in overtime in the championship game.

Jarvis was added to Canada's roster for the 2026 Winter Olympics on February 5, 2026, replacing Brayden Point, who was unable to participate due to injury. He recorded one assist at the tournament as Canada won the silver medal.

== Career statistics ==
=== Regular season and playoffs ===
			Regular season					Playoffs
Season	Team	League	GP	G	A	Pts	PIM	GP	G	A	Pts	PIM
2017–18	Portland Winterhawks	WHL	11	0	2	2	0	—	—	—	—	—
2018–19	Portland Winterhawks	WHL	61	16	23	39	19	5	0	3	3	4
2019–20	Portland Winterhawks	WHL	58	42	56	98	24	—	—	—	—	—
2020–21	Portland Winterhawks	WHL	24	15	12	27	15	—	—	—	—	—
2020–21	Chicago Wolves	AHL	9	7	4	11	4	—	—	—	—	—
2021–22	Carolina Hurricanes	NHL	68	17	23	40	18	14	3	5	8	4
2022–23	Carolina Hurricanes	NHL	82	14	25	39	12	15	5	5	10	0
2023–24	Carolina Hurricanes	NHL	81	33	34	67	14	11	5	4	9	0
2024–25	Carolina Hurricanes	NHL	73	32	35	67	16	15	6	10	16	6
2025–26	Carolina Hurricanes	NHL	71	32	34	66	23	19	4	7	11	4
NHL totals			375	128	151	279	83	74	23	31	54	14

=== International ===
Year	Team	Event	Result	GP	G	A	Pts	PIM
2018	Canada Red	U17	4th	6	2	3	5	2
2019	Canada	HG18	2nd place, silver medalist(s)	5	2	1	3	8
2025	Canada	4NF	1st place, gold medalist(s)	3	0	1	1	0
2026	Canada	OG	2nd place, silver medalist(s)	5	0	1	1	0
Junior totals				11	4	4	8	10
Senior totals				8	0	2	2	0

== Awards and honours ==
Award	Year	Ref
WHL
Brad Hornung Trophy	2020	
WHL Western Conference First All-Star Team	2020	
NHL
Stanley Cup champion	2026	

Awards and achievements
Preceded by Ryan Suzuki	Carolina Hurricanes first-round draft pick 2020	Succeeded by Bradly Nadeau
