= Dylan Coghlan =

Canadian ice hockey player (born 1998)

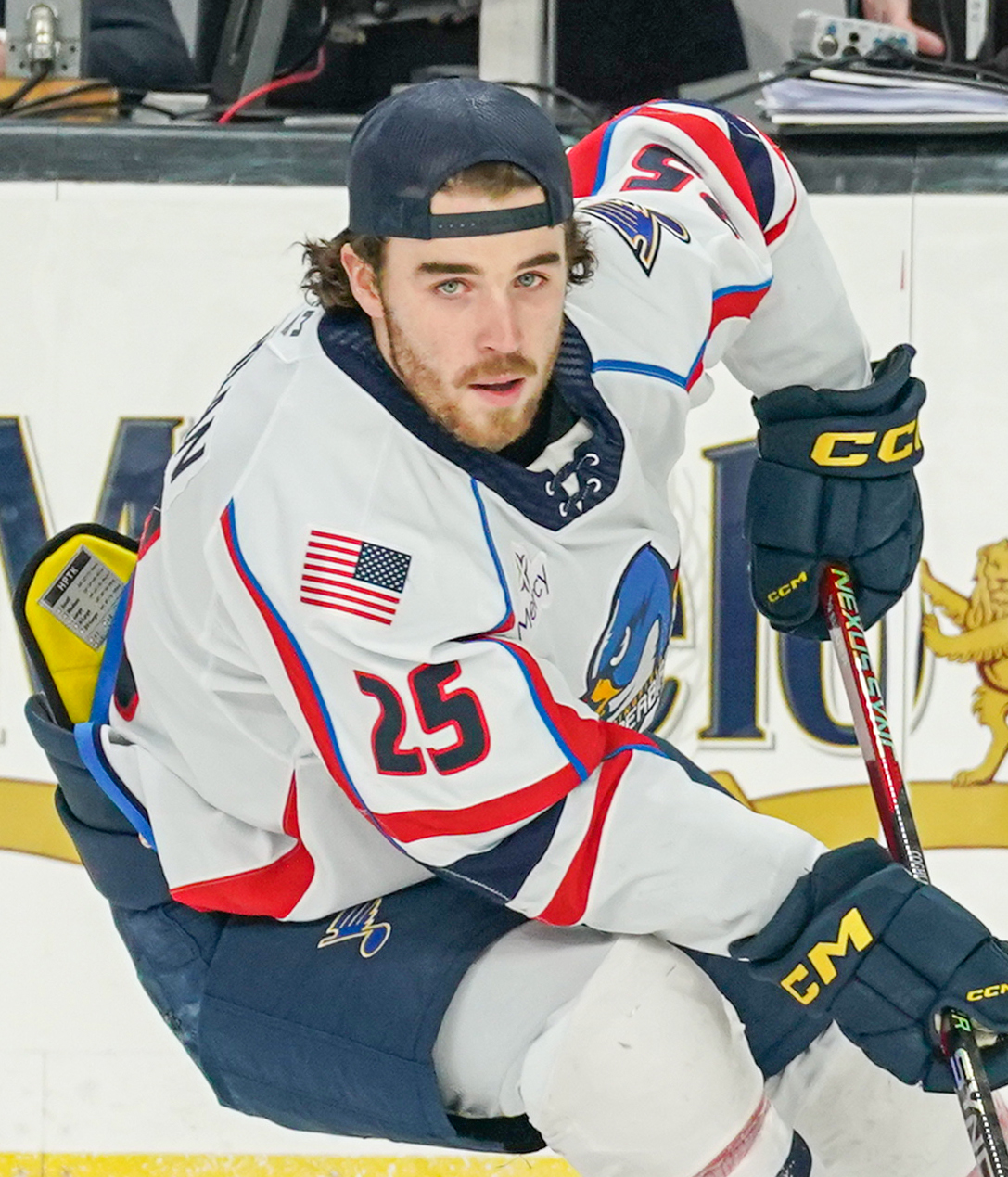
- Coghlan with the Springfield Thunderbirds in 2024
- Born: February 19, 1998 (age 28) Duncan, British Columbia, Canada
- Height: 6 ft 2 in (188 cm)
- Weight: 190 lb (86 kg; 13 st 8 lb)
- Position: Defence
- Shoots: Right
- NHL team Former teams: Vegas Golden Knights; Carolina Hurricanes; Winnipeg Jets
- NHL draft: Undrafted
- Playing career: 2018–present

Dylan Coghlan (born February 19, 1998) is a Canadian professional ice hockey player who is a defenceman for the Vegas Golden Knights of the National Hockey League (NHL).

== Early life ==
Coghlan was born on February 19, 1998, in Duncan, British Columbia but learned to skate in Port Hardy when his family lived there. As his family moved several times while he was growing up, Coghlan played for several minor hockey programs throughout the north and central Island. While living in Nanaimo, Coghlan said he took a big step in his career due to the exposure to Western Hockey League (WHL) scouts. He skated within the Nanaimo Minor Hockey system from 2009 to 2013 until he joined the North Island Silvertips of the BC Hockey Major Midget League at the age of 15.

== Playing career ==
Coghlan spent the 2012–13 season with the Nanaimo Clippers of the British Columbia Hockey League, where he gained attention from WHL scouts. After he recorded 18 goals and 40 points through 34 games, he was drafted in the third round, 63rd overall, by the Tri-City Americans in the 2013 Bantam Draft.

=== Professional ===
Coghlan was signed by the Vegas Golden Knights as an undrafted free agent after attending the team's inaugural development and NHL training camp on September 20, 2017.

On March 10, 2021, Coghlan scored his first career NHL goal and his first career NHL hat trick against the Minnesota Wild, becoming the third defenceman in NHL history to score his first three career goals in the same game. Additionally, he became the first rookie and the first defenceman to register a hat trick in Golden Knights franchise history.

On July 13, 2022, Coghlan and Max Pacioretty were traded to the Carolina Hurricanes for future considerations.

After two seasons with Carolina, Coghlan was traded to the Winnipeg Jets in exchange for future considerations on July 6, 2024.

Following his lone season in the Jets organization, Coghlan re-joined the Golden Knights, signing a one-year contract on July 1, 2025. After being recalled from the AHL on January 8, 2026, Coghlan played his first game for Vegas in nearly four years on the same day, recording just under 16 minutes in a 5–3 victory over the Columbus Blue Jackets.

Following an injury to Jeremy Lauzon, Coghlan was recalled to Vegas' roster on May 3, 2026, during the 2026 Stanley Cup playoffs. Remaining in the lineup even following Lauzon's return, Coghlan subsequently took on an expanded role, scoring his first-ever playoff goal in Game 1 of the Western Conference final against the Colorado Avalanche, and adding two assists in 13 playoff games played. Coghlan played five of Vegas' six games in the 2026 Stanley Cup Final, where the Golden Knights lost to Coghlan's former team in the Carolina Hurricanes. Coghlan subsequently signed a two-year extension with Vegas on July 1, keeping him with the Golden Knights through the 2027–28 season.

== Career statistics ==
			Regular season					Playoffs
Season	Team	League	GP	G	A	Pts	PIM	GP	G	A	Pts	PIM
2013–14	Nanaimo Clippers	BCHL	2	0	0	0	0	—	—	—	—	—
2014–15	Tri-City Americans	WHL	55	2	3	5	16	4	1	2	3	4
2015–16	Tri-City Americans	WHL	70	4	20	24	39	—	—	—	—	—
2016–17	Tri-City Americans	WHL	71	15	38	53	26	4	0	1	1	2
2017–18	Tri-City Americans	WHL	69	17	46	63	65	14	3	11	14	12
2018–19	Chicago Wolves	AHL	66	15	25	40	22	7	0	2	2	0
2019–20	Chicago Wolves	AHL	60	11	13	24	14	—	—	—	—	—
2020–21	Vegas Golden Knights	NHL	29	3	3	6	2	—	—	—	—	—
2021–22	Vegas Golden Knights	NHL	59	3	10	13	18	—	—	—	—	—
2022–23	Chicago Wolves	AHL	5	2	1	3	4	—	—	—	—	—
2022–23	Carolina Hurricanes	NHL	17	0	3	3	2	—	—	—	—	—
2023–24	Springfield Thunderbirds	AHL	61	16	25	41	40	—	—	—	—	—
2023–24	Carolina Hurricanes	NHL	1	0	0	0	0	—	—	—	—	—
2024–25	Winnipeg Jets	NHL	6	0	0	0	4	—	—	—	—	—
2024–25	Manitoba Moose	AHL	36	12	16	28	22	—	—	—	—	—
2025–26	Henderson Silver Knights	AHL	62	14	30	44	28	3	0	1	1	2
2025–26	Vegas Golden Knights	NHL	3	0	0	0	2	13	1	2	3	4
NHL totals			115	6	16	22	28	13	1	2	3	4
