= Brandon Bussi =

American ice hockey player (born 1998)

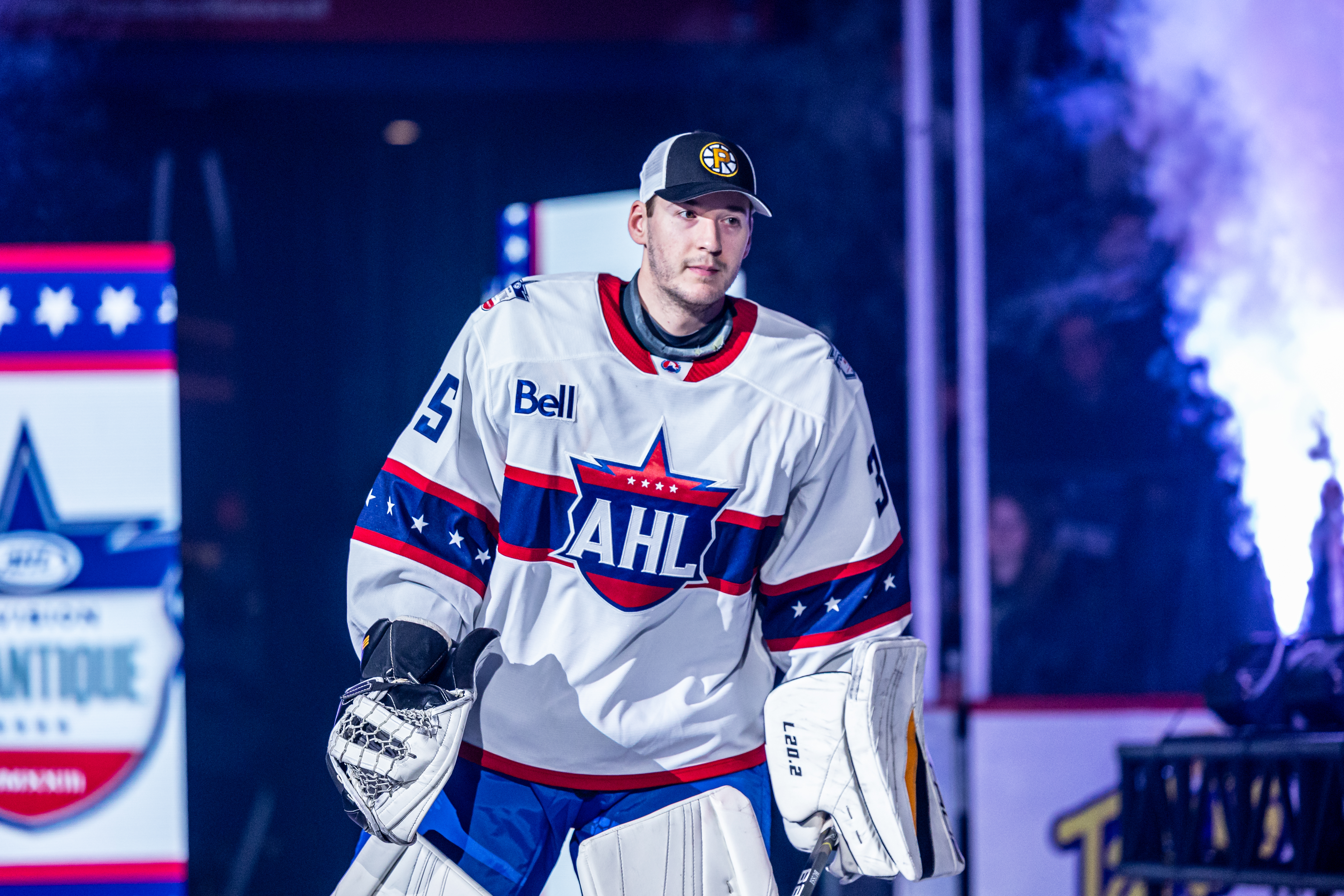
- Bussi at the 2023 AHL All-Star Game
- Born: June 25, 1998 (age 28) Sound Beach, New York, U.S
- Height: 6 ft 4 in (193 cm)
- Weight: 218 lb (99 kg; 15 st 8 lb)
- Position: Goaltender
- Catches: Right
- NHL team: Carolina Hurricanes
- NHL draft: Undrafted
- Playing career: 2022–present

Brandon Thomas Bussi (born June 25, 1998) is an American professional ice hockey player who is a goaltender for the Carolina Hurricanes of the National Hockey League (NHL). He played college ice hockey for Western Michigan University in the National Collegiate Athletic Association (NCAA). Bussi won the Stanley Cup with the Hurricanes in 2026.

== Playing career ==
=== Collegiate ===
Bussi committed to playing college ice hockey for the Western Michigan University Broncos during the 2019–20 season.

In the 2021–22 season, Bussi helped the Broncos earn their first-ever win in the NCAA tournament, making 30 saves in a 2–1 overtime win over Northeastern University. Western Michigan was eliminated in the next round by the University of Minnesota.

=== Professional ===
==== Boston Bruins ====
On March 30, 2022, the Boston Bruins announced that Bussi would forgo his senior year to sign a one-year, entry-level contract with the team. He played the rest of the season with Boston's American Hockey League (AHL) affiliate, the Providence Bruins. He appeared in five games with the team, recording a 3–2–0 record with a shutout.

Bussi has described his early career mental approach as perfectionist, acknowledging that poor performances and losses would carry over negatively into practices and subsequent games, and that overcoming this tendency was central to his development as a professional.

Bussi had a very successful first full season with the Providence Bruins. As a rookie, he finished the 2022–23 season sixth in the league among goalies in goals against average (GAA) with 2.40 and second in the league in save percentage (SV%), with .924. Bussi's play got him named to the 2023 AHL All-Star Game, representing the Atlantic Division. On April 12, 2023, Bussi was recalled to the NHL squad for an emergency recall. Although he dressed as the backup, he did not play, and was sent back down shortly after. Bussi was named to the AHL's All-Rookie Team at season's end.

On June 19, 2023, the Bruins announced that they had extended Bussi to a one-year, two-way contract worth $775,000.

Bussi's successful first season had him penciled in as Providence's starting goaltender for the 2023–24 season. Although with the increased responsibility, Bussi's statistics dipped a little, he still had a successful season, starting 41 games and going 23–10–5. Throughout the season, Bussi was occasionally called up to the NHL team on an emergency basis, due to injuries to Boston's goaltenders Jeremy Swayman and Linus Ullmark. However, Bussi only served as a backup for those games, and did not see NHL action on any of these call-ups. At season's end, for the second consecutive year, the Providence Bruins were set to face the Hartford Wolf Pack in the first round of the Calder Cup playoffs. Bussi started all four games, registering a shutout in Providence's 6–0 game 2 win. However, this was the only win of the series for Bussi and the Bruins, as they fell in four games, with the final two losses going to overtime.

On June 24, 2024, the Bruins announced that they had once again extended Bussi to a one-year, two-way contract worth $775,000.

Bussi started the 2024–25 opening game for the Providence Bruins, a 5–2 loss against the Laval Rocket, which saw him give up five goals. As the season progressed, although their starts were mostly even, Bussi lost out on the starting goaltender job to fellow goaltender Michael DiPietro due to play. Bussi's season was very up-and-down, as he recorded a career-high five shutouts throughout the season, but also had five games where he allowed five or more goals, also a career-high. DiPietro earned the starting nod for the 2025 Calder Cup playoffs over Bussi. However, in the early minutes of game 4 of the divisional round against the Charlotte Checkers, DiPietro was injured, forcing Bussi to come in and try to earn the win to stave off elimination. Bussi made 31 saves on 33 shots as the Bruins beat the Checkers in overtime to force a decisive game 5. Bussi got the nod in game 5, however the Bruins could not muster any offensive play, getting only eight shots on goal in a 5–2 loss, ending their season.

==== Carolina Hurricanes ====
On July 1, 2025, after three years in the Bruins organization, Bussi signed a one-year, two-way contract with the Florida Panthers. However, just three months later, on October 5, Bussi was claimed off waivers by the Carolina Hurricanes.

Bussi was named to the Hurricanes' opening night roster for the 2025–26 season, filling in for the injured Pyotr Kochetkov. Bussi made his NHL debut on October 14, 2025, against the San Jose Sharks, earning a 5–1 victory. On November 30, Bussi earned his first career shutout in a 1-0 overtime win against the Calgary Flames. Following a win over the Los Angeles Kings on February 1, 2026, Bussi won his 21st game, breaking an NHL record for the most wins by a goaltender through their first 25 games which was previously held by Andrew Hammond and Bill Durnan. On February 16, Bussi signed a three-year contract worth $5.7 million to stay with the Hurricanes. Bussi finished the regular season with a 31–6–2 record, and a 2.47 GAA and a .894 SV%. The Hurricanes entered the 2026 Stanley Cup playoffs as the top seed in the Eastern Conference, and Bussi was named the backup for the playoffs behind Frederik Andersen. Bussi made his playoff debut on June 6, after Andersen was injured in game 3 of the Stanley Cup Final after letting in four goals against the Vegas Golden Knights, going down 4–0. Bussi stopped Mitch Marner's penalty shot, with Carolina eventually coming back to force overtime. Vegas won in double overtime, and Bussi finished the game with 18 saves on 19 shots. Bussi was subsequently named the starter for Game 4 of the Final, where he helped the Hurricanes to a 5–3 victory to tie the series at two games apiece. He became the first right-catching goaltender to start a Stanley Cup Final game since Tom Barrasso in 1992, and as such, the first right-catching goaltender to win a Finals game since Barrasso as well.. In game 6, Bussi would earn his first Stanley Cup playoff shutout, his first Stanley Cup Final shutout, and first Stanley Cup as the Hurricanes won the game 3–0 to win their second Stanley Cup championship.

== Personal life ==
Bussi's younger brother, Dylan, has autism, and Bussi's goalie mask designs include symbols of autism awareness as a tribute to him.

On July 17, 2026, Bussi married his college sweetheart Mary Raclawski at Saint Paul's Parish in Cambridge, Massachusetts.

== Career statistics ==
			Regular season									Playoffs
Season	Team	League	GP	W	L	OTL	MIN	GA	SO	GAA	SV%	GP	W	L	MIN	GA	SO	GAA	SV%
2018–19	Muskegon Lumberjacks	USHL	52	33	12	4	2,824	115	7	2.44	.915	8	4	4	474	20	1	2.53	.894
2019–20	Western Michigan University	NCHC	34	18	12	4	1,922	85	0	2.65	.910	—	—	—	—	—	—	—	—
2020–21	Western Michigan University	NCHC	4	2	1	0	211	10	0	2.84	.889	—	—	—	—	—	—	—	—
2021–22	Western Michigan University	NCHC	39	26	12	1	2,334	99	4	2.55	.912	—	—	—	—	—	—	—	—
2021–22	Providence Bruins	AHL	5	3	2	0	307	13	1	2.54	.920	—	—	—	—	—	—	—	—
2022–23	Maine Mariners	ECHL	4	3	1	0	240	10	0	2.50	.922	—	—	—	—	—	—	—	—
2022–23	Providence Bruins	AHL	32	22	5	4	1,879	75	1	2.40	.924	4	1	3	237	9	0	2.28	.926
2023–24	Providence Bruins	AHL	41	23	10	5	2,403	107	1	2.67	.913	4	1	3	252	9	1	2.14	.922
2024–25	Providence Bruins	AHL	33	15	14	4	1,905	88	5	2.77	.907	2	1	1	124	5	0	2.42	.918
2025–26	Carolina Hurricanes	NHL	39	31	6	2	2,361	97	2	2.47	.895	4	3	1	225	6	1	1.60	.931
NHL totals			39	31	6	2	2,361	97	2	2.47	.895	4	3	1	225	6	1	1.60	.931

== Awards and honors ==
Award	Year	Ref
USHL
Third All-Star Team	2019	
AHL
All-Rookie Team	2023	
All-Star Classic	2023	
NHL
Stanley Cup champion	2026	
