= Jaccob Slavin =

American ice hockey player (born 1994)

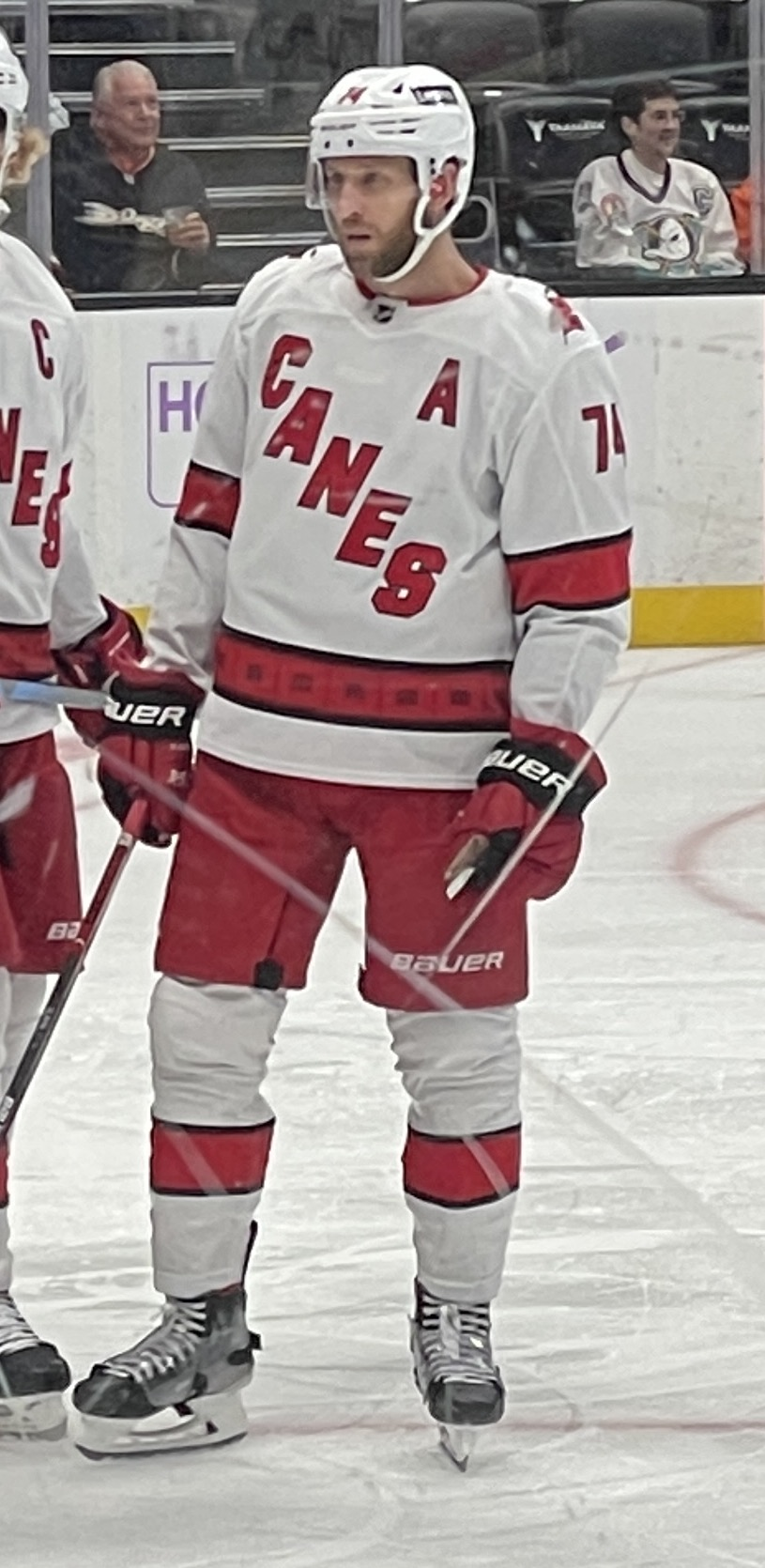
- Slavin with the Carolina Hurricanes in 2021
- Born: May 1, 1994 (age 32) Erie, Colorado, U.S.
- Height: 6 ft 3 in (191 cm)
- Weight: 207 lb (94 kg; 14 st 11 lb)
- Position: Defense
- Shoots: Left
- NHL team: Carolina Hurricanes
- National team: United States
- NHL draft: 120th overall, 2012; Carolina Hurricanes
- Playing career: 2015–present

Jaccob Scott Slavin (born May 1, 1994) is an American professional ice hockey player who is a defenseman and alternate captain for the Carolina Hurricanes of the National Hockey League (NHL). Slavin was selected by the Hurricanes in the fourth round, 120th overall, of the 2012 NHL entry draft. He won the Stanley Cup with the Hurricanes in 2026.

An NHL All-Star and two-time recipient of the Lady Byng Memorial Trophy, Slavin has been cited among the greatest defensive defensemen of his era.

== Playing career ==
As a youth, Slavin played in the 2007 Quebec International Pee-Wee Hockey Tournament with the Colorado Thunderbirds minor ice hockey team.

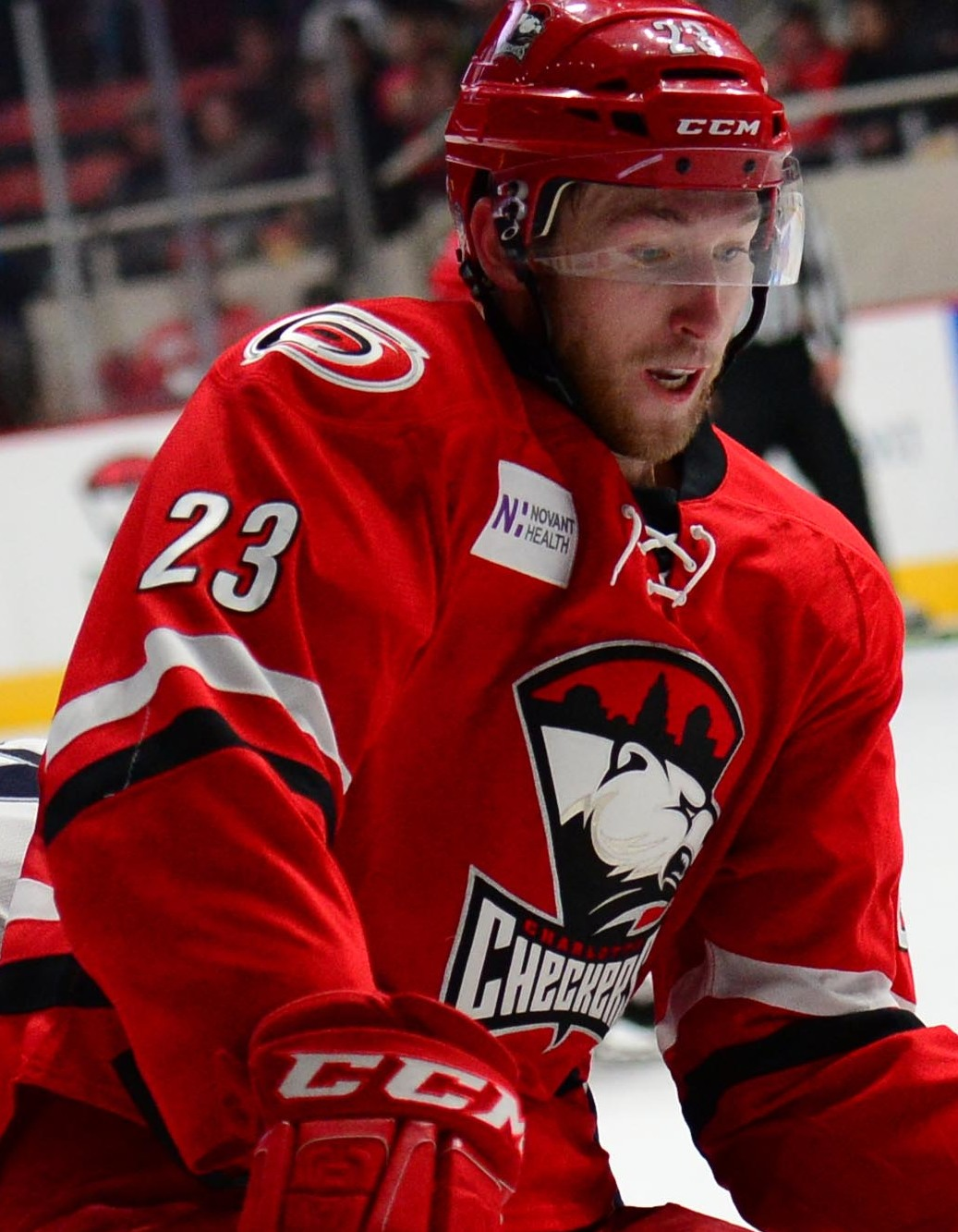
Slavin with the Charlotte Checkers in 2015

Slavin was drafted by the Carolina Hurricanes in the fourth round, 120th overall, of the 2012 NHL entry draft. Despite being drafted, Slavin committed to Colorado College to play for the NCAA Division I Tigers ice hockey team. In his first year, his outstanding play was recognized when he was selected as NCHC Rookie of the Year and named to both the 2013–14 NCHC All-Rookie Team and the 2013–14 NCHC All-Conference Second Team.

The following season, Slavin was named to the 2014–15 NCHC All-Conference First Team. Following his sophomore year, Slavin signed a three-year, entry-level contract with the Carolina Hurricanes, forgoing his collegiate career.

Slavin made his professional debut to start the 2015–16 season with the Hurricanes' American Hockey League (AHL) affiliate, the Charlotte Checkers. With 7 assists in his first 14 games with the Checkers, Slavin was recalled by the Hurricanes and made his NHL debut on November 20, 2015. Slavin scored his first NHL hat-trick on March 13, 2017, away against the New York Islanders.

On July 12, 2017, the Hurricanes signed Slavin to a seven-year, $37.1 million contract worth $5.3 million annually. The contract began in the 2018–19 season.

On August 1, 2020, Slavin scored his first career playoff goal against the New York Rangers. He became the first player to score a goal in an NHL game in August.

Slavin was awarded the Lady Byng Memorial Trophy as the league's most gentlemanly player for the 2020–21 season. He received the award after accumulating only one minor penalty while averaging 22:59 of ice time over 52 games. Three years later he received the Lady Byng Trophy for the second time, after registering 37 points and only four minor penalties across 81 games in the 2023–24 season, becoming the second defenseman after Red Kelly to win the trophy multiple times.

On July 1, 2024, Slavin signed an eight-year, $51.69 million contract extension with the Hurricanes, carrying an average annual value of $6.46 million. Slavin became the second American to win an Olympic Gold Medal and the Stanley Cup in the same year after winning the 2026 Stanley Cup, he is also the ninth player in history overall and one of five American players who had won both a gold medal and Stanley Cup.

== International play ==
Medal record

Men's ice hockey

Representing the United States

Olympic Games
Gold medal – first place	2026 Milano Cortina	

On January 2, 2026, he was named to the United States roster for the 2026 Winter Olympics. Amid online backlash faced by the men's Olympic hockey team regarding the inclusion of FBI director Kash Patel during their gold medal celebrations and members of the team laughing at President Trump's comments of being impeached if he did not invite the women's team to the White House, Slavin was among the majority who visited with the president and attended the State of the Union.

== Personal life ==
Slavin grew up in Erie, Colorado, with four other siblings—Justin, Josiah, Jeremiah, and Jordan—all of whom were also active athletes. Slavin and his wife Kylie are devoted Christians. The couple has two children: a daughter, who was adopted, and a biological son who was born in July 2022.

== Career statistics ==
=== Regular season and playoffs ===
			Regular season					Playoffs
Season	Team	League	GP	G	A	Pts	PIM	GP	G	A	Pts	PIM
2010–11	Colorado Thunderbirds 16U AAA	T1EHL	34	5	21	26	12	—	—	—	—	—
2010–11	Colorado Thunderbirds 18U AAA	T1EHL	15	1	0	1	0	—	—	—	—	—
2010–11	Chicago Steel	USHL	17	1	0	1	10	—	—	—	—	—
2011–12	Chicago Steel	USHL	60	3	27	30	12	—	—	—	—	—
2012–13	Chicago Steel	USHL	62	5	28	33	6	—	—	—	—	—
2013–14	Colorado College	NCHC	32	5	20	25	11	—	—	—	—	—
2014–15	Colorado College	NCHC	34	5	12	17	2	—	—	—	—	—
2015–16	Charlotte Checkers	AHL	14	0	7	7	0	—	—	—	—	—
2015–16	Carolina Hurricanes	NHL	63	2	18	20	8	—	—	—	—	—
2016–17	Carolina Hurricanes	NHL	82	5	29	34	12	—	—	—	—	—
2017–18	Carolina Hurricanes	NHL	82	8	22	30	10	—	—	—	—	—
2018–19	Carolina Hurricanes	NHL	82	8	23	31	18	15	0	11	11	0
2019–20	Carolina Hurricanes	NHL	68	6	30	36	10	8	1	1	2	0
2020–21	Carolina Hurricanes	NHL	52	3	12	15	2	8	1	5	6	0
2021–22	Carolina Hurricanes	NHL	79	4	38	42	10	14	2	6	8	6
2022–23	Carolina Hurricanes	NHL	76	7	20	27	8	15	2	4	6	2
2023–24	Carolina Hurricanes	NHL	81	6	31	37	8	11	1	2	3	2
2024–25	Carolina Hurricanes	NHL	80	6	21	27	8	15	2	2	4	0
2025–26	Carolina Hurricanes	NHL	39	1	7	8	4	19	0	5	5	0
NHL totals			784	56	251	307	98	105	9	36	45	10

=== International ===
Year	Team	Event	Result	GP	G	A	Pts	PIM
2011	United States	IH18	5th	4	0	0	0	0
2014	United States	WJC	5th	5	1	1	2	0
2025	United States	4NF	2nd place, silver medalist(s)	4	0	0	0	0
2026	United States	OG	1st place, gold medalist(s)	6	0	1	1	0
Junior totals				9	1	1	2	0
Senior totals				10	0	1	1	0

== Awards and honors ==
Award	Year	Ref
College
NCHC Rookie of the Year	2014	
NCHC All-Rookie Team	2014	
NCHC All-Conference Second Team	2014	
NCHC All-Conference First Team	2015	
NHL
NHL All-Star Game	2020	
Lady Byng Memorial Trophy	2021, 2024	
Stanley Cup champion	2026	

Awards and achievements
Preceded by Award Created	NCHC Rookie of the Year; 2013–14	Succeeded by Danton Heinen
Preceded by Nathan MacKinnon; Anže Kopitar	Lady Byng Memorial Trophy; 2021; 2024	Succeeded by Kyle Connor; Anze Kopitar
