= Cole Smith (ice hockey) =

American ice hockey player (born 1995)

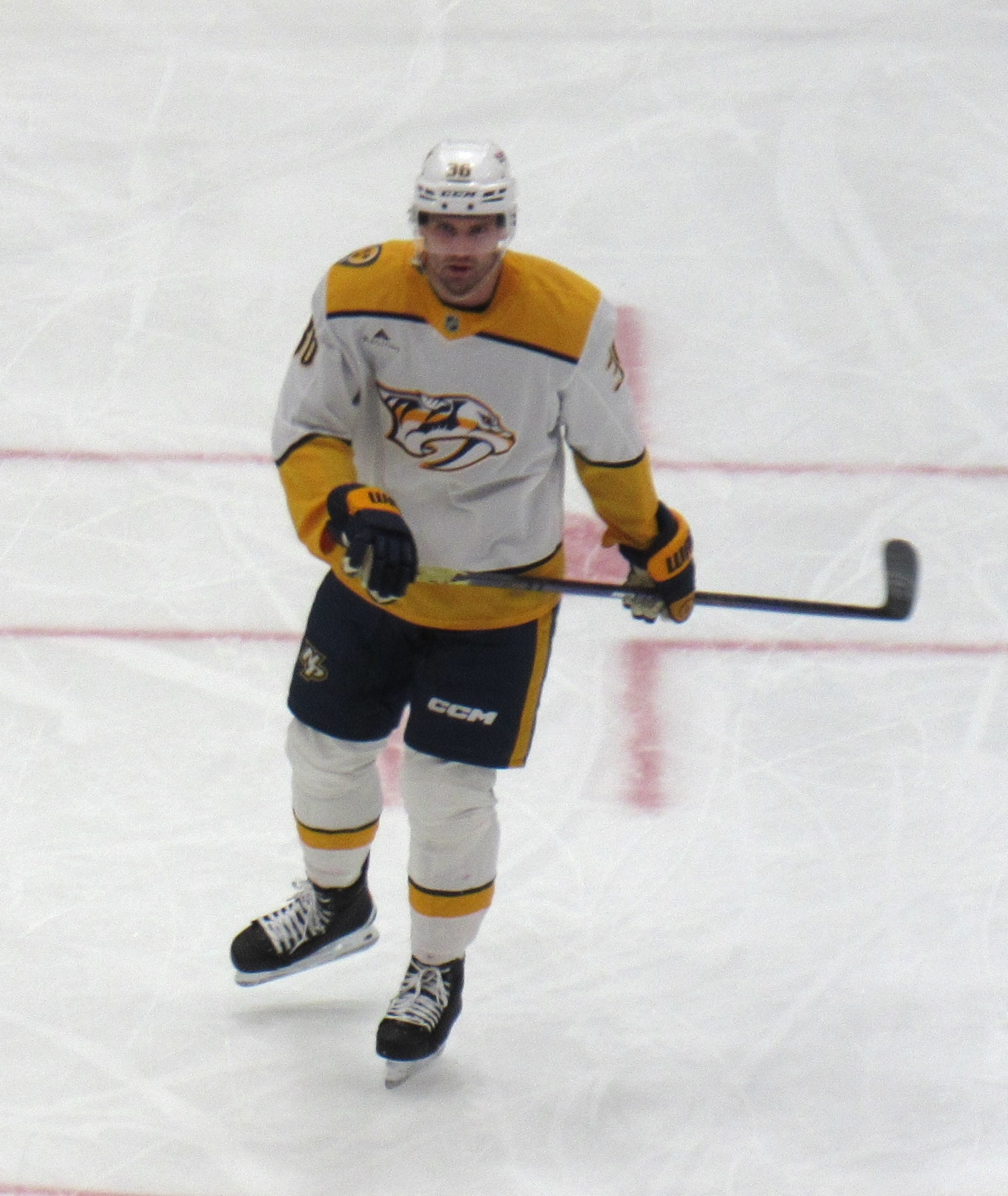
- Smith with the Nashville Predators in 2026
- Born: October 28, 1995 (age 30) Brainerd, Minnesota, U.S.
- Height: 6 ft 3 in (191 cm)
- Weight: 195 lb (88 kg; 13 st 13 lb)
- Position: Left wing
- Shoots: Left
- NHL team Former teams: Chicago Blackhawks; Nashville Predators; Vegas Golden Knights
- NHL draft: Undrafted
- Playing career: 2020–present

Cole Smith (born October 28, 1995) is an American professional ice hockey player who is a left winger for the Chicago Blackhawks of the National Hockey League (NHL).

== Early life ==
Smith was born on October 28, 1995, in Brainerd, Minnesota, to Tom and Kris Smith. He was born into an athletic family as his mother, father, sister, uncle, and numerous cousins all participated in sports at the college level. His father played football at St. Cloud State University and mother ran track at Concordia College-Moorhead. His youngest sister Gabbie plays ice hockey for Bemidji State University (BSU) while his middle sister Allyson played soccer for BSU. His uncle Sandy also played collegiate hockey and played professionally for Eisbären Berlin in the Deutsche Eishockey Liga. In 2009, his mother Kris was inducted into the Concordia College Athletics Department Hall of Fame as she had set program records for indoor and outdoor long jump. Numerous members of his family were inducted into the Warrior Athletic Hall of Fame and named Brainerd Athletes of the Year.

== Career ==
=== Amateur ===
Growing up in Brainerd, Minnesota, Smith became good friends with future American Hockey League teammate Mitch McLain. Despite their two-year age difference, they played youth baseball together and participated in the U10 Little League World Series. While attending Brainerd High School from 2011 to 2014, Smith participated in three sports; ice hockey, football, and track. Smith excelled in all three sports while attending Brainerd High School. In football, he played defensive back, wide receiver, and played on special teams. During the 2013 season, Smith helped the Brainerd Warriors finish with a 12–1 record and was named to the Minnesota Vikings All-State High School Team, All-Section and All-Conference teams, and the Warriors Defensive Player of the Year. His coach Ron Stolski described him as "a player with a great work ethic, a quiet leader who leads by example, and a difference-maker." He was also three-year starter for the Brainerd ice hockey team and finished his career ninth on the Warriors’ all-time scoring list with 110 total points. In track, Smith won the triple jump for Brainerd's only first-place finish in the 2014 Wayzata Invitational. After graduating, Smith was selected in the 10th round of the United States Hockey League Draft by the Sioux Falls Stampede.

=== Manitoba Junior Hockey League ===
Smith participated in the Stampede's tryout sessions before the 2014–15 season but was cut before the roster was finalized. He subsequently joined the Steinbach Pistons in the Canadian-based Manitoba Junior Hockey League (MJHL) due to a family connection to the head coach. In his first season with the Pistons, Smith accumulated 12 goals and 11 assists for 23 points over 38 games. He also gained the attention of scouts from the University of North Dakota (UND), Bemidji State University, and the University of Michigan. During his second season with the team, Smith greatly improved on his rookie season and led the team in scoring with 26 goals and ranked second with 61 points. His offensive efforts helped the Pistons qualify for the MJHL's Turnbull Cup where he scored seven goals and 11 assists in 15 playoff games. Smith was recognized with the MJHL's Player of the Month of April honor after recording four goals and six assists through eight playoff games. Although numerous colleges had been interested in him, only UND extended him a 20 percent scholarship. He officially committed to join UND for the 2016–17 season after visiting the school in March.

=== College ===
Smith played college hockey for the North Dakota Fighting Hawks at the University of North Dakota from 2016 to 2020 while majoring in kinesiology. Although he struggled to earn playing time at the start of his freshman season, Smith became a regular in the lineup by the end of the season. He scored his first collegiate goal in his college debut against Rensselaer Polytechnic Institute on October 15. As the Fighting Hawks qualified for the National Collegiate Hockey Conference (NCHC) Quarterfinals, Smith assisted on the game-tying and game-winning goals in their 6–5 overtime win over St. Cloud State in Game 2. He skated in the final 12 games of the 2016–17 regular season and finished with three goals and four assists in 29 games.

Although he was scratched for the Fighting Hawks 2017–18 season opener, Smith became a key player for the team as the season continued. Over the final six games of November, Smith was tied for the team lead in assists and led the team with a plus-6 rating. On December 2, Smith tied Ben Cherski's school record for fastest goal to start the third period after he scored seven seconds into the third period of a game against Western Michigan. He quickly became a mainstay on the Fighting Hawks' third line with Johnny Simonson and Trevor Olson. In the nine games leading up to the Christmas break, Smith led all UND forwards with six points and scored in three consecutive games. On January 26, Smith was suspended one game following an illegal hit to the head of University of Denver defenseman Adam Plant. Smith finished his sophomore season with a career-high five goals and five assists for 10 points.

During his junior season, Smith consistently played alongside Gavin Hain and Mark Senden. The trio finished in the top three amongst team scorers and registering a combined plus-45. Smith finished his junior season with five goals and a career-high 11 assists for 16 points. He received the team's Cliff 'Fido' Purpur Award as a player who exemplifies hard work and determination and was named an American Hockey Coaches Association Division I All American Scholar.

Prior to the start of his senior year, Smith was named an assistant captain for the Fighting Hawks. In his senior year, Smith was a key component of a Fighting Hawks team that posted the top regular season record in the NCHC, including setting a record for most consecutive home wins at the Ralph Engelstad Arena. Although the Fighting Hawks finished with the conference's regular-season title, they were unable to compete for the conference and national championships because of the COVID-19 pandemic. Smith finished the regular season with a career-high 11 goals and 18 points over 34 games and was named as a finalist for the NCHC Defensive Forward of the Year award.

=== Nashville Predators ===
Smith officially concluded his collegiate career on March 19, 2020, after signing a one-year contract with the Nashville Predators of the National Hockey League. Ahead of the delayed 2020–21 season, Smith was given the jersey number 36 after he made his original number 15 available for veteran Brad Richardson. Before joining the Predators' training camp for the pandemic-shortened, Smith was re-assigned to their ECHL affiliate, the Florida Everblades. He played five games with the Everblades in December 2020, tallying three points, before being recalled to join the Predators' training camp. Due to the unique nature of the season, Smith was named to the Predators "taxi squad," a group of players who travelled with the team to enable swift call-ups in the event of positive COVID-19 cases. One day into the regular season, Smith was recalled to the active roster and made his NHL debut on January 14, against the Columbus Blue Jackets. He recorded one shot on goal in 5:57 minutes of ice time in the Predators' 3–1 win. By making his NHL debut, Smith became the first former Pistons player to ever appear in an NHL game. This would be his only NHL game of the season as he was shortly thereafter assigned to the Predators American Hockey League (AHL) affiliate, the Chicago Wolves, on January 21. Smith recorded his first career AHL points, a goal and assist, on February 20 in a 10–2 win over the Iowa Wild. He later recorded his first professional two-goal game on April 17 against the Rockford IceHogs, although the team would lose in a shootout. He finished the regular season with five goals and five assists for 10 points and 16 penalty minutes over 23 games. Upon concluding his rookie season with the Wolves, the Predators signed Smith to a one-year, two-way contract extension worth $750,000 at the NHL level and $70,000 at the AHL level on July 15, 2021.

After attending the Predators 2021 training camp, Smith was re-assigned to their new AHL affiliate, the Milwaukee Admirals, prior to the start of the 2021–22 season. On November 5, Smith scored his first goal as a member of the Admirals to help the team clinch a 2–1 win over the Manitoba Moose and snap a four-game losing streak. Following this game, Smith added two-assist against the Iowa Wild for his first multi-point contest of the season. After tallying three goals and three assists over nine games with the Admirals, Smith was recalled to the NHL level on November 13. He was returned to the Admirals on November 20 after Nick Cousins was activated from injured reserve. Upon returning to the AHL, Smith added two goals and four assists over the next 11 games for 12 total points before being recalled back to the NHL on December 16. He played that night against the Colorado Avalanche and the following night against the Chicago Blackhawks before being reassigned on December 18. Smith added five more points with the Admirals before earning his third NHL recall of the season on January 11. After going pointless in the next three games, Smith was reassigned to the Predators "taxi squad." In his first game back with the Admirals on January 31, Smith scored twice to help lead the team to a 5–0 win over the Grand Rapids Griffins. Leading up to his fourth NHL recall on February 14, Smith became the fifth member of the Admirals to reach double-digits in goals and ranked sixth on the team in points with 22. Smith's efforts with the Admirals helped lift them from last place in the Central division to third place. He scored his 20th goal of the season, and second in the game, on April 16 to help the Admirals qualify for the Calder Cup playoffs for the first time since the 2018–19 season. Over his eight NHL games of the season, Smith recorded 21 hits while averaging 8:50 minutes of ice time. He finished the AHL regular season with 21 goals and 20 assists for 41 points over 59 games, the fourth most on the team. As a result of his play, Smith signed a one-year, two-way contract extension with the Predators on July 14, 2022.

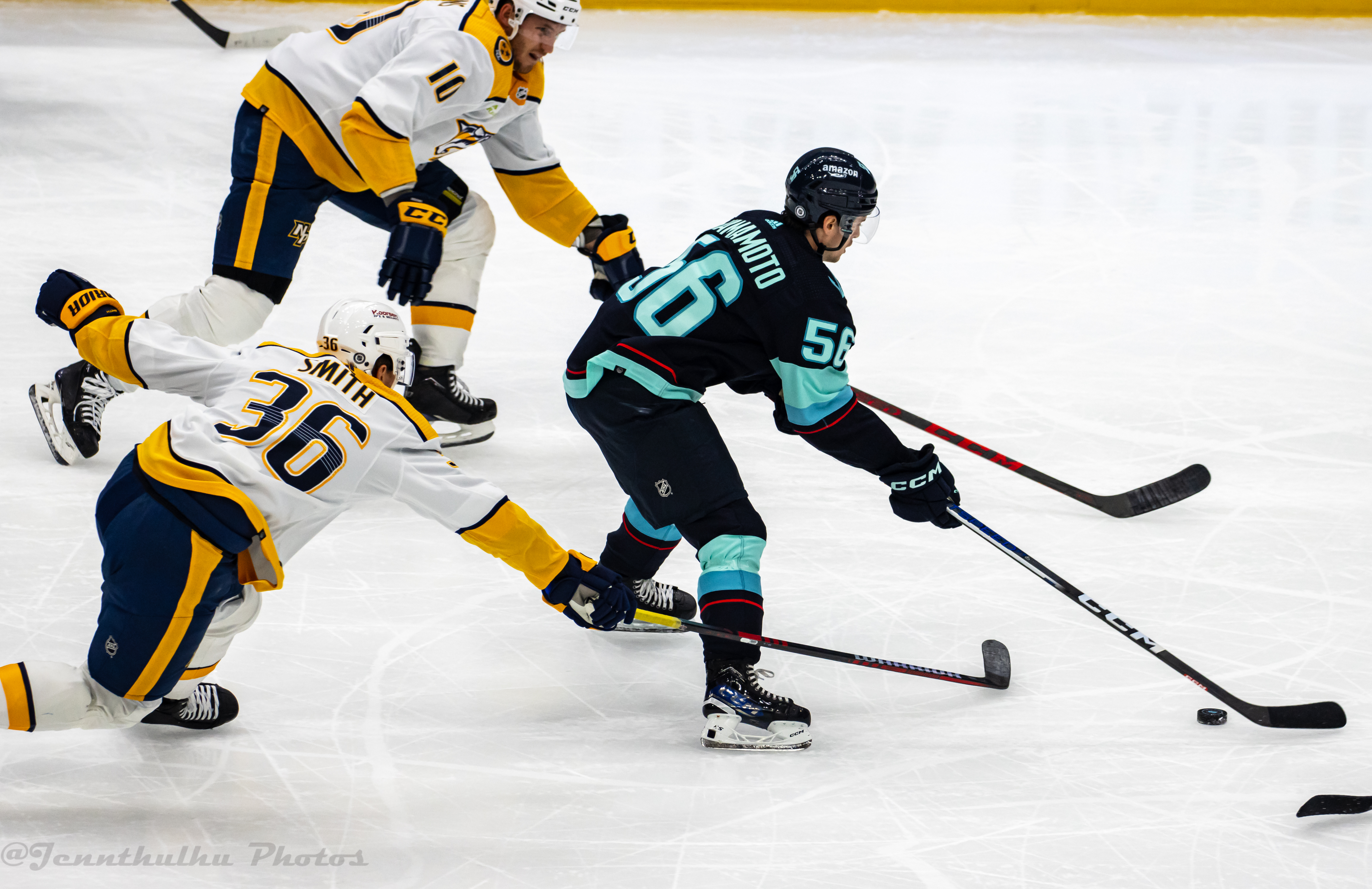
Smith (bottom left) reaching for the puck during a game against the Seattle Kraken in November 2023.

Smith began the 2022–23 season on the Predators opening night roster for the first time in his professional career. On October 7, Smith recorded his first career NHL point, an assist, in a 4–1 win over the San Jose Sharks. On January 21, 2023, in his 49th NHL game, Smith scored his first career goal to lift the Predators 5–3 over the Los Angeles Kings. Smith missed the final two weeks of the regular season to recover from the concussion, finishing with four goals and 13 assists for 17 points over 69 games. In his absence, the Predators fell three points shy of qualifying for the 2023 Stanley Cup playoffs.

Smith began the 2023–24 season on the fourth line but was quickly bumped up onto a line with Cody Glass and Gustav Nyquist. In his first game on this line, Smith recorded an assist, two shots on goal, and four hits to lift the Predators over the Seattle Kraken on October 12. On December 21, 2023, Smith scored his first career short handed goal against the Philadelphia Flyers. On January 24, Smith signed a two-year, $2 million contract extension with the Predators. At the time, he had accumulated a career-high five goals and 13 assists for 17 points over 46 games.

=== Vegas Golden Knights ===
During the 2025–26 season, having posted 10 points through 42 games, Smith was traded by the Predators to the Vegas Golden Knights in exchange for Christoffer Sedoff and a 2028 third-round draft pick on March 3, 2026. Smith debuted for Vegas the following day, playing just over 14 minutes in a 4–3 overtime win against the Detroit Red Wings.

=== Chicago Blackhawks ===
Smith signed a three-year, $9 million dollar contract with the Chicago Blackhawks on July 1, 2026.

== Career statistics ==
			Regular season					Playoffs
Season	Team	League	GP	G	A	Pts	PIM	GP	G	A	Pts	PIM
2011–12	Brainerd High	USHS	25	17	6	23	25	3	1	1	2	2
2012–13	Brainerd High	USHS	24	21	18	39	53	3	1	2	3	0
2013–14	Brainerd High	USHS	23	18	23	41	50	2	1	1	2	2
2014–15	Steinbach Pistons	MJHL	38	12	11	23	25	12	6	2	8	2
2015–16	Steinbach Pistons	MJHL	54	26	35	61	45	15	7	11	18	16
2016–17	U. of North Dakota	NCHC	29	3	4	7	24	—	—	—	—	—
2017–18	U. of North Dakota	NCHC	37	5	5	10	66	—	—	—	—	—
2018–19	U. of North Dakota	NCHC	37	5	11	16	50	—	—	—	—	—
2019–20	U. of North Dakota	NCHC	34	11	7	18	37	—	—	—	—	—
2020–21	Florida Everblades	ECHL	5	1	2	3	0	—	—	—	—	—
2020–21	Nashville Predators	NHL	1	0	0	0	0	—	—	—	—	—
2020–21	Chicago Wolves	AHL	23	5	5	10	16	—	—	—	—	—
2021–22	Milwaukee Admirals	AHL	59	21	20	41	62	9	3	2	5	8
2021–22	Nashville Predators	NHL	8	0	0	0	0	—	—	—	—	—
2022–23	Nashville Predators	NHL	69	4	13	17	60	—	—	—	—	—
2023–24	Nashville Predators	NHL	80	9	14	23	63	5	0	0	0	0
2024–25	Nashville Predators	NHL	71	4	8	12	69	—	—	—	—	—
2025–26	Nashville Predators	NHL	42	6	4	10	31	—	—	—	—	—
2025–26	Vegas Golden Knights	NHL	21	2	0	2	9	22	3	3	6	24
NHL totals			292	25	39	64	232	27	3	3	6	24
