= 2002 ECAC Hockey men's ice hockey tournament =

2002 ECAC Men's ice hockey tournament
- Dates: March 8–16, 2002
- Teams: 10
- Finals site: Olympic Arena; Lake Placid, New York
- Champions: Harvard (6th title)
- Winning coach: Mark Mazzoleni (1st title)
- MVP: Tyler Kolarik (Harvard)
- ECAC Men's Ice Hockey Tournaments

The 2002 ECAC Hockey Men's Ice Hockey Tournament was the 41st tournament in league history. It was played between March 8 and March 16, 2002. Quarterfinal games were played at home team campus sites, while the final five games were played at the Olympic Arena (subsequently renamed Herb Brooks Arena) in Lake Placid, New York. By winning the tournament, Harvard received the ECAC's automatic bid to the 2002 NCAA Division I Men's Ice Hockey Tournament.

== Format ==
The tournament featured three rounds of play. The two teams that finish below tenth place in the standings are not eligible for tournament play. In the first round, the first and tenth seeds, the second and ninth seeds, the third seed and eighth seeds, the fourth seed and seventh seeds and the fifth seed and sixth seeds played a best-of-three series with the three highest-seeded winners advancing to the semifinals and the remaining two winners playing in the Four vs. Five matchup. After the opening round every series becomes a single-elimination game. In the semifinals, the highest seed plays the winner of the four vs. five game while the two remaining teams play with the winners advancing to the championship game and the losers advancing to the third place game. The tournament champion receives an automatic bid to the 2002 NCAA Men's Division I Ice Hockey Tournament.

== Conference standings ==
Note: GP = Games played; W = Wins; L = Losses; T = Ties; PTS = Points; GF = Goals For; GA = Goals Against

2001–02 ECAC Hockey standings
	Conference							Overall					
	GP	W	L	T	PTS	GF	GA	GP	W	L	T	GF	GA
#9 Cornell†	22	17	3	2	36	74	34	35	25	8	2	118	63
Clarkson	22	11	6	5	27	62	51	38	17	15	6	109	97
#13 Harvard*	22	10	9	3	23	67	62	34	15	15	4	97	99
Dartmouth	22	9	8	5	23	66	59	32	14	13	5	97	89
Rensselaer	22	10	9	3	23	64	59	37	20	13	4	120	101
Princeton	22	10	10	2	22	51	63	31	11	18	2	66	98
Colgate	22	10	10	2	22	53	59	34	13	19	2	90	121
Brown	22	10	10	2	22	52	53	31	14	15	2	72	80
St. Lawrence	22	9	11	2	20	62	64	34	11	21	2	83	107
Yale	22	9	11	2	20	70	65	31	10	19	2	93	94
Union	22	8	11	3	19	53	58	32	13	13	6	94	90
Vermont	22	3	18	1	7	46	93	31	3	26	2	62	134
Championship: Harvard † indicates conference regular season champion (Cleary Cup) * indicates conference tournament champion (Whitelaw Cup); Final rankings: USA Today/American Hockey Magazine Poll Top 15 Poll

== Bracket ==
Teams are reseeded after the first round of the Tournament.

First round March 8–9
1	Cornell	2	4	–
10	Yale	1	2	–
2	Clarkson	3	6	–
9	St. Lawrence	1	1	–
3	Harvard	4	2**	–
8	Brown	1	1	–
4	Dartmouth	5**	4	–
7	Colgate	4	1	–
5	Rensselaer	5	6	–
6	Princeton	3	0	–

Four vs. Five; March 14
4	Dartmouth	1
5	Rensselaer	2

Semifinals; March 15
1	Cornell	3
5	Rensselaer	0
2	Clarkson	2
3	Harvard	3*

Championship; March 16
1	Cornell	3
3	Harvard	4**

Note: * denotes overtime period(s)

=== First round ===
==== (1) Cornell vs. (10) Yale ====
March 8	Cornell	2 – 1	Yale	Lynah Rink	Recap
No Scoring		First period	02:44 - Chris Higgins (Earl)
(Paolini, Iggulden) Matthew McRae - 14:52; Douglas Murray - GW SH - 17:51		Second period	No scoring
No scoring		Third period	No scoring
Matt Underhill ( 21 saves / 22 shots )		Goalie stats	Dan Lombard ( 25 saves / 27 shots )

March 9	Cornell	4 – 2	Yale	Lynah Rink	Recap
(Bell) Greg Hornby - 02:13 (Knoepfli, Wiekowski) David Francis - 18:00		First period	05:00 - Jason Noe (Steeves, Deschenes)
(Knoepfli, Cook) Matthew McRae - GW PP - 11:01		Second period	No scoring
Travis Bell - EN SH - 15:26		Third period	19:57 - EA PP - Nick Deschenes (Earl, Rodgers)
Matt Underhill ( 16 saves / 18 shots )		Goalie stats	Dan Lombard ( 20 saves / 23 shots )

Cornell won series 2–0

==== (2) Clarkson vs. (9) St. Lawrence ====
March 8	Clarkson	3 – 1	St. Lawrence	Cheel Arena	Recap
(Ellis-Toddington) Randy Jones - PP - 09:17		First period	No scoring
No scoring		Second period	No scoring
(Jones, Ellis-Toddington) Matt Poapst - GW PP - 06:39 (Jones, Lush) Jay Latulippe - 10:44		Third period	16:11 - PP - Rich Peverley (Page, Carruthers)
Mike Walsh ( 32 saves / 33 shots )		Goalie stats	Mike McKenna ( 17 saves / 20 shots )

March 9	Clarkson	6 – 1	St. Lawrence	Cheel Arena	Recap
(Edwards, Desrochers) Joe Carosa - 05:03 (Ellis-Toddington, Line) David Evans - GW - 19:24		First period	13:43 - Stace Page (Peverley, Lorentz)
(Latulippe, Jones) Rob McFeeters - PP - 01:30 (McFeeters, O'Flaherty) Ian Manzano - 04:18		Second period	No scoring
(Line, Bahen) David Evans - 06:10 (Ellis-Toddington, Blight) David Evans - 09:24		Third period	No scoring
Mike Walsh ( 30 saves / 31 shots )		Goalie stats	Mike McKenna ( 25 saves / 31 shots ) / Sean Knaub ( 3 saves / 3 shots )

Clarkson won series 2–0

==== (3) Harvard vs. (8) Brown ====
March 8	Harvard	4 – 1	Brown	Bright Hockey Center	Recap
(Bernakevitch) Tom Cavanagh - 02:16 (Cavanagh) Noah Welch - GW PP - 17:17		First period	No scoring
No scoring		Second period	No scoring
(Welch, Cavanagh) Tim Pettit - PP - 00:27 (Kolarik) Dominic Moore - EN - 19:41		Third period	10:26 - Shane Mudryk (Kirley)
Dov Grumet-Morris ( 22 saves / 23 shots )		Goalie stats	Yann Danis ( 31 saves / 34 shots )

March 9	Harvard	2 – 1	2OT	Brown	Bright Hockey Center	Recap
No Scoring		First period		No scoring
No scoring		Second period		19:59 - PS - Brent Robinson
(Kolarik, Bernakevitch) Brett Nowak - 05:30		Third period		No scoring
Dominic Moore - GW - 14:41		Second overtime period		No scoring
Dov Grumet-Morris ( 31 saves / 32 shots )		Goalie stats		Yann Danis ( 66 saves / 68 shots )

Harvard won series 2–0

==== (4) Dartmouth vs. (7) Colgate ====
March 8	Dartmouth	5 – 4	2OT	Colgate	Thompson Arena	Recap
(Stempniak, Baldwin) Jamie Herrington - 15:05 (Maturo, Gillings) Brian Van Abel - 18:37		First period		04:58 - Bob Vandersluis (Mitchell, McKinnon); 12:22 - Joey Mormina (Vandersluis)
No scoring		Second period		No scoring
(Gillings, Murray) Mike Maturo - 11:00 (Gillings, Herrington) Lee Stempniak - EA - 19:45		Third period		10:27 - PP - Brad D'Arco (Mormina, Yedon); 19:16 - Adam Mitchell (Vandersluis, McKinnon)
(Gillings, Murray) Pete Summerfelt - GW - 14:15		Second overtime period		No scoring
Dan Yacey ( 5 saves / 7 shots ) / Darren Gastrock ( 48 saves / 50 shots )		Goalie stats		Dave Cann ( 49 saves / 54 shots )

March 9	Dartmouth	4 – 1	Colgate	Thompson Arena	Recap
(Herrington, Summerfelt) Lee Stempniak - 00:51		First period	11:15 - PP - P.J. Yedon (Yashin, D'Arco)
No scoring		Second period	No scoring
(Baldwin, Herrington) Frank Nardella - GW PP - 05:13 (Murray, Maturo) Kent Gillings - 07:02 (Maturo, Baldwin) Chris Taliercio - EN - 19:45		Third period	No scoring
Darren Gastrock ( 37 saves / 38 shots )		Goalie stats	Dave Cann ( 33 saves / 36 shots )

Dartmouth won series 2–0

==== (5) Rensselaer vs. (6) Princeton ====
March 8	Rensselaer	5 – 3	Princeton	Houston Field House	Recap
(Graham, Murley) Jim Vickers - 11:43		First period	No scoring
(McPherson, Basiuk) Carson Butterwick - 10:03		Second period	00:20 - Sharam Fouladger-Mercer (Schneider); 04:27 - PP - Steve Slaton (Parsons, Parros)
(Henkel, Cavosie) Chris Migliore - 01:05 (Henkel, Cavosie) Chris Migliore - GW - 01:18 (Butterwick, Barr) Andrew McPherson - 12:20		Third period	01:50 - Josh Roberts (Schneider, Parsons)
Nathan Marsters ( 19 saves / 22 shots )		Goalie stats	Dave Stathos ( 33 saves / 38 shots )

March 9	Rensselaer	6 – 0	Princeton	Houston Field House	Recap
(Migliore, Murley) Jim Vickers - GW - 03:42 (Murley, Barnes) Marc Cavosie - 08:36 (Graham, Shields) Matt Murley - 14:47		First period	No scoring
(Cavosie, Vickers) Danny Eberly - PP - 10:17 (Basiuk, Munn) Conrad Barnes - PP - 13:34		Second period	No scoring
Chris Migliore - SH - 01:11		Third period	No scoring
Nathan Marsters ( 19 saves / 19 shots ) / James Palmer ( 2 saves / 2 shots )		Goalie stats	Dave Stathos ( 5 saves / 8 shots ) / Nate Nomeland ( 14 saves / 17 shots )

Rensselaer won series 2–0

=== Four vs. Five ===
==== (4) Dartmouth vs. (5) Rensselaer ====
March 14	Dartmouth	1 – 2	Rensselaer	Olympic Arena	Recap
No Scoring		First period	No scoring
No scoring		Second period	No scoring
(Stempniak, Herrington) Christopher Baldwin - 10:59		Third period	17:24 - Matt Murley (Henkel, Eberly); 18:52 - GW - Scott Basiuk (Barr)
Darren Gastrock ( 16 saves / 18 shots )		Goalie stats	Nathan Marsters ( 34 saves / 35 shots )

=== Semifinals ===
==== (1) Cornell vs. (5) Rensselaer ====
March 15	Cornell	3 – 0	Rensselaer	Olympic Arena	Recap
(Knoepfli, Ladouceur) Charlie Cook - GW PP - 04:42		First period	No scoring
(Kozier) Charlie Cook - 07:02		Second period	No scoring
(McRae) Sam Paolini - 07:06		Third period	No scoring
Matt Underhill ( 21 saves / 21 shots )		Goalie stats	Nathan Marsters ( 24 saves / 27 shots )

==== (2) Clarkson vs. (3) Harvard ====
March 15	Clarkson	2 – 3	OT	Harvard	Olympic Arena	Recap
No Scoring		First period		15:36 - Dominic Moore (Fried)
Trevor Edwards - 07:25		Second period		No scoring
(Poapst, Ellis-Toddington) Kevin O'Flaherty - 18:14		Third period		02:49 - Brett Nowak (McCulloch, Packard)
No scoring		First overtime period		15:19 - GW - Tom Cavanagh (Bernakevitch)
Mike Walsh ( 41 saves / 44 shots )		Goalie stats		Dov Grumet-Morris ( 39 saves / 41 shots )

=== Third place ===
==== (2) Clarkson vs. (5) Rensselaer ====
March 16	Clarkson	3 – 4	Rensselaer	Olympic Arena	Recap
(Evans, Manzano) Tristan Lush - PP - 13:26 (Jones, O'Flaherty) Matt Poapst - 15:58		First period	17:01 - PP - Matt Murley (Vickers, Cavosie)
(O'Flaherty, Poapst) Randy Jones - PP - 15:06		Second period	No scoring
No scoring		Third period	01:23 - PP - Marc Cavosie (Murley, Eberly); 08:06 - PP - Nolan Graham (Basiuk, Munn); 19:28 - GW PP - Matt Murley (Eberly, Vickers)
Mike Walsh ( 30 saves / 34 shots )		Goalie stats	Nathan Marsters ( 31 saves / 34 shots )

=== Championship ===
==== (1) Cornell vs. (3) Harvard ====
March 16	Cornell	3 – 4	2OT	Harvard	Olympic Arena	Recap
(Palahicky, McRae) Krzysztof Wiekowski - 17:28		First period		16:38 - Dominic Moore (McCulloch)
(Murray) Sam Paolini - PP - 00:42 (Hornby) Shane Palahicky - 16:05		Second period		07:01 - PP - Tim Pettit (Nowak, Capouch); 19:44 - Tim Pettit (Bernakevitch, Cavanagh)
No scoring		Third period		No scoring
No scoring		Second overtime period		16:11 - GW - Tyler Kolarik (Bernakevitch, Pettit)
Matt Underhill ( 40 saves / 44 shots )		Goalie stats		Dov Grumet-Morris ( 26 saves / 29 shots )

== Tournament awards ==
=== All-Tournament Team ===
- F Tim Pettit (Harvard)
- F Matt Murley (Rensselaer)
- F Sam Paolini (Cornell)
- D Kerry Ellis-Toddington (Clarkson)
- D Douglas Murray (Cornell)
- G Matt Underhill (Cornell)

* Most Outstanding Player(s)
