= Colin Hemingway =

Canadian ice hockey player

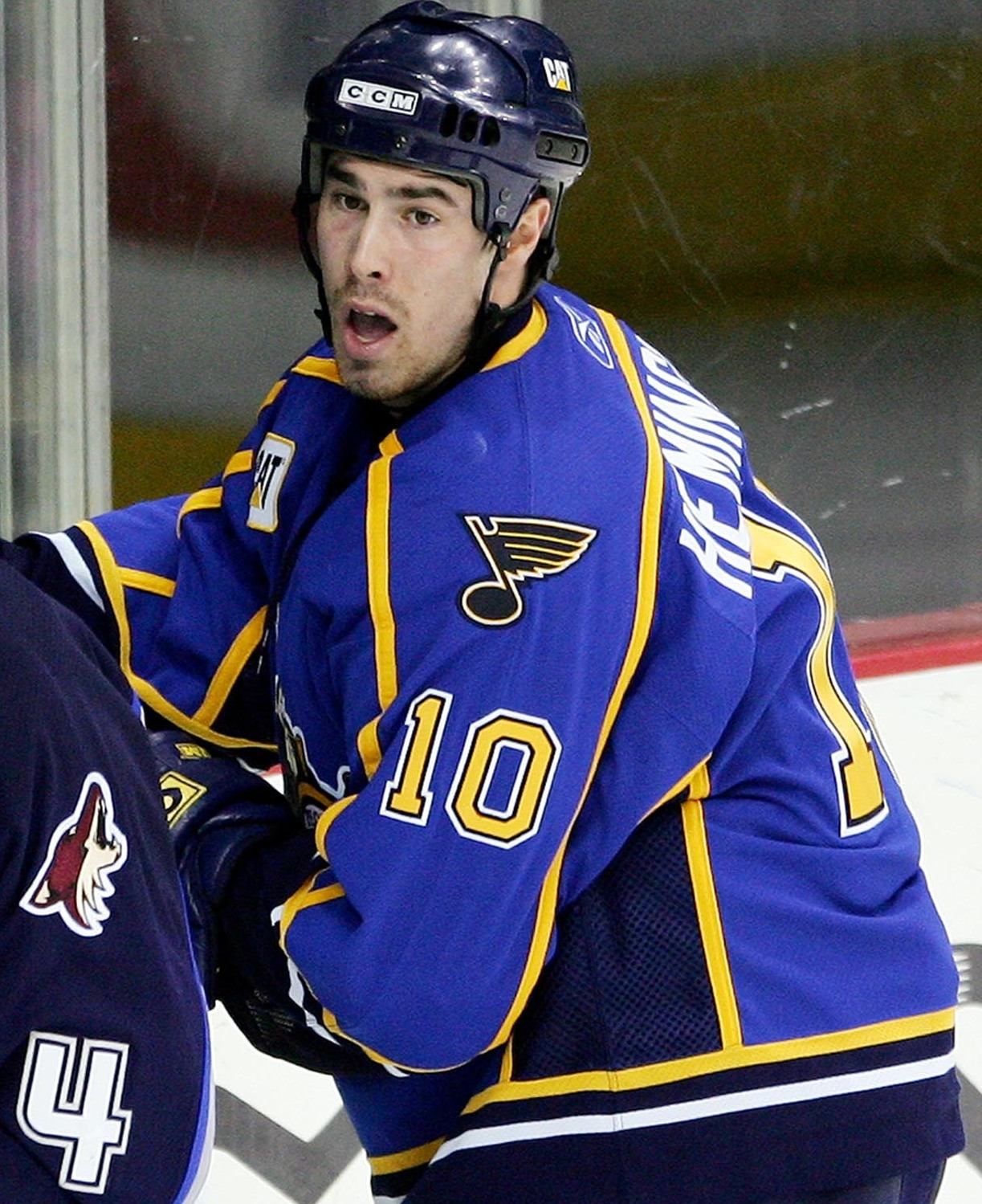
- Hemingway with the Peoria Rivermen in 2006
- Born: August 12, 1980 (age 45) Regina, Saskatchewan, Canada
- Height: 6 ft 0 in (183 cm)
- Weight: 195 lb (88 kg; 13 st 13 lb)
- Position: Right wing
- Shot: Right
- Played for: St. Louis Blues; Edinburgh Capitals; Belfast Giants
- NHL draft: 221st overall, 1999; St. Louis Blues
- Playing career: 2003–2012

Colin Hemingway (born August 12, 1980) is a Canadian former professional ice hockey player. He played 3 games in the National Hockey League with the St. Louis Blues during the 2005–06 season. The rest of his career, which lasted from 2003 to 2012, was mainly spent in the minor leagues. As a youth, he played in the 1994 Quebec International Pee-Wee Hockey Tournament with a minor ice hockey team from Surrey, British Columbia.

== Career statistics ==
=== Regular season and playoffs ===
			Regular season					Playoffs
Season	Team	League	GP	G	A	Pts	PIM	GP	G	A	Pts	PIM
1996–97	Port Coquitlam Buckeroos	PIJHL	34	23	24	47	52	—	—	—	—	—
1997–98	South Surrey Eagles	BCHL	58	12	16	28	46	—	—	—	—	—
1998–99	South Surrey Eagles	BCHL	59	40	64	104	52	11	10	11	21	6
1999–00	University of New Hampshire	HE	22	3	5	8	6	—	—	—	—	—
2000–01	University of New Hampshire	HE	37	9	18	27	16	—	—	—	—	—
2001–02	University of New Hampshire	HE	40	33	33	66	30	—	—	—	—	—
2002–03	University of New Hampshire	HE	40	22	25	47	51	—	—	—	—	—
2003–04	Worcester IceCats	AHL	13	2	0	2	11	—	—	—	—	—
2003–04	Peoria Rivermen	ECHL	36	20	24	44	34	2	0	0	0	0
2004–05	Worcester IceCats	AHL	24	5	2	7	6	—	—	—	—	—
2004–05	Peoria Rivermen	ECHL	20	8	10	18	6	—	—	—	—	—
2005–06	St. Louis Blues	NHL	3	0	0	0	0	—	—	—	—	—
2005–06	Peoria Rivermen	AHL	29	7	9	16	19	—	—	—	—	—
2005–06	Alaska Aces	ECHL	5	1	2	3	2	—	—	—	—	—
2006–07	Pensacola Ice Pilots	ECHL	23	13	10	23	31	—	—	—	—	—
2006–07	SERC Wild Wings	GER-2	17	3	5	8	29	4	0	2	2	0
2007–08	Edinburgh Capitals	EIHL	47	33	33	66	79	2	1	1	2	0
2008–09	Alaska Aces	ECHL	64	25	42	67	77	21	9	16	25	14
2008–09	Providence Bruins	AHL	4	0	1	1	0	—	—	—	—	—
2009–10	Alaska Aces	ECHL	28	13	17	30	24	—	—	—	—	—
2009–10	Stockton Thunder	ECHL	34	11	20	31	30	8	3	2	5	4
2010–11	Belfast Giants	EIHL	31	12	22	34	28	3	0	2	2	0
2011–12	Wichita Thunder	CHL	30	8	16	24	10	—	—	—	—	—
ECHL totals			210	91	125	216	204	31	12	18	30	18
NHL totals			3	0	0	0	0	—	—	—	—	—

== Awards and honours ==
Award	Year
All-Hockey East First Team	2001–02
AHCA East First-Team All-American	2001–02
Hockey East All-Tournament Team	2002
All-Hockey East Second Team	2002–03
AHCA East Second-Team All-American	2002–03

Awards and achievements
Preceded by Brian Gionta	Hockey East Three-Stars Award; 2001–02	Succeeded by Ben Eaves; Joe Exter
