= Judd Medak =

Canadian ice hockey player

- Born: September 20, 1979 (age 46) Edmonton, Alberta, Canada
- Height: 5 ft 11 in (180 cm)
- Weight: 190 lb (86 kg; 13 st 8 lb)
- Position: Left wing
- Shot: Left
- Played for: AHL; Chicago Wolves; Manchester Monarchs; Hershey Bears; Syracuse Crunch; ECHL; Greenville Grrrowl; Reading Royals; BNL; Fife Flyers
- NHL draft: Undrafted
- Playing career: 2002–2005

Judd Medak (born September 20, 1979) is a Canadian former professional ice hockey player.

Medak attended the University of Minnesota Duluth where he played four years (1998 - 2002) of NCAA hockey with the Minnesota–Duluth Bulldogs, scoring 30 goals and 61 assists for 91 points, while earning 293 penalty minutes, in 144 games played.

Medak went on to play three seasons of professional hockey, predominantly in the ECHL where he skated in 141 games, registering 50 goals and 66 assists for 116 points, along with 216 penalty minutes. He also played 23 games in the American Hockey League and 14 games with the Fife Flyers of the British National League.

== Awards and honors ==
Award	Year
All-WCHA Second team	2001–02
