= 2001–02 NCAA Division I men's ice hockey season =

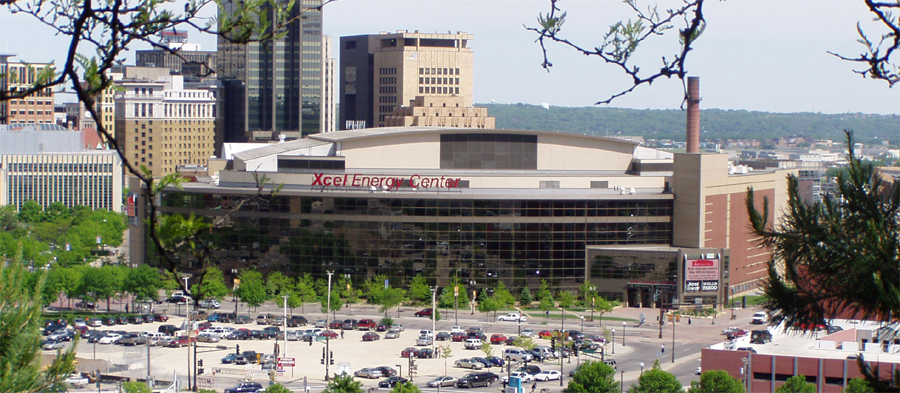
- The Xcel Energy Center in St. Paul, Minnesota hosted the 2002 Frozen Four
- Duration: October 5, 2001– April 6, 2002
- NCAA tournament: 2002
- National championship: Xcel Energy Center; St. Paul, Minnesota
- NCAA champion: Minnesota
- Hobey Baker Award: Jordan Leopold (Minnesota)

The 2001–02 NCAA Division I men's ice hockey season began on October 5, 2001, and concluded with the 2002 NCAA Division I Men's Ice Hockey Tournament's championship game on April 6, 2002, at the Xcel Energy Center in Saint Paul, Minnesota. This was the 55th season in which an NCAA ice hockey championship was held and is the 108th year overall where an NCAA school fielded a team.

== Season Outlook ==
=== Pre-season polls ===
The top teams in the nation as ranked before the start of the season.

The U.S. College Hockey Online poll was voted on by coaches, media, and NHL scouts. The USA Today/American Hockey Magazine poll was voted on by coaches and media.

USCHO Poll
Rank	Team
1	Michigan State (33)
2	North Dakota (4)
3	Colorado College
4	Minnesota (3)
5	Michigan
6	Providence
7	Maine
8	St. Cloud State
9	Harvard
10	New Hampshire
11	Boston College
12	Clarkson
13	Nebraska-Omaha
14	Dartmouth
15	Boston University

USA Today Poll
Rank	Team
1	Michigan State (6)
2	North Dakota (7)
3	Minnesota (2)
4	Michigan
5	Providence
6	Colorado College
7	Boston College (4)
8	Harvard
9	St. Cloud State
10	Maine
11	New Hampshire
12	Nebraska-Omaha
13	Clarkson
14	Wisconsin
15 (tie)	Dartmouth
15 (tie)	Denver

== Regular season ==
=== Season tournaments ===
Tournament	Dates	Teams	Champion
Ice Breaker Tournament	October 12–13	4	St. Cloud State
Nye Frontier Classic	October 12–13	4	Denver
Maverick Stampede	October 12–13	4	Minnesota–Duluth
Syracuse Invitational	November 23–24	4	Niagara
College Hockey Showcase	November 23–25	4	
New Hampshire Tournament	November 24–25	4	New Hampshire
Badger Showdown	December 27–28	4	New Hampshire
Denver Cup	December 28–29	4	Denver
Great Lakes Invitational	December 28–29	4	North Dakota
Mariucci Classic	December 28–29	4	Minnesota
Rensselaer Holiday Tournament	December 28–29	4	Rensselaer
Sheraton/Howard Bank Hockey Classic	December 28–29	4	Lake Superior State
Silverado Shootout	December 28–29	4	Boston College
Florida College Classic	December 29–30	4	Northern Michigan
Beanpot	February 4, 11	4	Boston University

=== Standings ===
2001–02 Central Collegiate Hockey Association standings
	Conference							Overall					
	GP	W	L	T	PTS	GF	GA	GP	W	L	T	GF	GA
#4 Michigan†*	28	19	5	4	42	97	56	44	28	11	5	154	102
#8 Michigan State	28	18	6	4	40	87	47	41	27	9	5	129	73
#11 Northern Michigan	28	16	10	2	34	86	69	40	26	12	2	135	98
#12 Alaska-Fairbanks	28	15	10	3	33	91	55	37	22	12	3	132	108
Nebraska-Omaha	28	13	11	4	30	72	64	41	21	16	4	112	102
Western Michigan	28	13	12	3	29	92	92	38	19	15	4	123	118
#15 Ohio State	28	12	12	4	28	71	81	40	20	16	4	109	112
Notre Dame	28	12	12	4	28	95	86	38	16	17	5	117	113
Ferris State	28	12	15	1	25	86	83	36	15	20	1	117	109
Miami	28	9	17	2	20	68	88	36	12	22	2	89	121
Bowling Green	28	7	18	3	17	78	104	40	9	25	6	103	145
Lake Superior State	28	4	22	2	10	38	106	37	8	27	2	61	132
Championship: Michigan † indicates conference regular season champion * indicates conference tournament champion Final rankings: USA Today/American Hockey Magazine Poll Top 15 Poll

2001–02 College Hockey America standings
	Conference							Overall					
	GP	W	L	T	PTS	GF	GA	GP	W	L	T	GF	GA
Wayne State†*	20	15	2	3	33	84	48	36	21	11	4	124	112
Bemidji State	19	8	7	4	22	65	61	35	12	18	5	116	146
Alabama-Huntsville	20	10	9	1	21	75	77	37	18	18	1	128	140
Niagara	19	8	10	1	19	61	65	35	17	17	1	120	118
Air Force	18	6	10	2	14	53	63	34	16	16	2	123	119
Findlay	20	5	14	1	11	57	81	35	11	22	2	105	140
Championship: Wayne State † indicates conference regular season champion * indicates conference tournament champion Final rankings: USA Today/American Hockey Magazine Poll Top 15 Poll

2001–02 ECAC Hockey standings
	Conference							Overall					
	GP	W	L	T	PTS	GF	GA	GP	W	L	T	GF	GA
#9 Cornell†	22	17	3	2	36	74	34	35	25	8	2	118	63
Clarkson	22	11	6	5	27	62	51	38	17	15	6	109	97
#13 Harvard*	22	10	9	3	23	67	62	34	15	15	4	97	99
Dartmouth	22	9	8	5	23	66	59	32	14	13	5	97	89
Rensselaer	22	10	9	3	23	64	59	37	20	13	4	120	101
Princeton	22	10	10	2	22	51	63	31	11	18	2	66	98
Colgate	22	10	10	2	22	53	59	34	13	19	2	90	121
Brown	22	10	10	2	22	52	53	31	14	15	2	72	80
St. Lawrence	22	9	11	2	20	62	64	34	11	21	2	83	107
Yale	22	9	11	2	20	70	65	31	10	19	2	93	94
Union	22	8	11	3	19	53	58	32	13	13	6	94	90
Vermont	22	3	18	1	7	46	93	31	3	26	2	62	134
Championship: Harvard † indicates conference regular season champion (Cleary Cup) * indicates conference tournament champion (Whitelaw Cup); Final rankings: USA Today/American Hockey Magazine Poll Top 15 Poll

2001–02 Hockey East standings
	Conference							Overall					
	GP	W	L	T	PTS	GF	GA	GP	W	L	T	GF	GA
#3 New Hampshire†*	24	17	4	3	37	103	49	40	30	7	3	184	102
#6 Boston University	24	15	6	3	33	80	65	38	25	10	3	141	110
#2 Maine	24	14	5	5	33	99	62	44	26	11	7	186	116
#14 Massachusetts–Lowell	24	12	9	3	27	70	67	38	22	13	3	121	91
Northeastern	24	11	11	2	24	69	74	39	19	17	3	123	116
Boston College	24	10	13	1	21	73	81	38	18	18	2	119	116
Providence	24	8	13	3	19	68	82	38	13	20	5	115	129
Merrimack	24	6	16	2	14	54	87	36	11	23	2	101	133
Massachusetts	24	3	19	2	8	45	94	34	8	24	2	70	125
Championship: New Hampshire † indicates conference regular season champion * indicates conference tournament champion Final rankings: USA Today/American Hockey Magazine Poll Top 15 Poll

2001–02 Metro Atlantic Athletic Conference standings
	Conference							Overall					
	GP	W	L	T	PTS	GF	GA	GP	W	L	T	GF	GA
Mercyhurst†	26	21	2	3	45	103	48	37	24	10	3	130	89
Quinnipiac*	26	15	6	5	35	89	57	38	20	13	5	129	110
Holy Cross	26	14	7	5	33	95	69	34	17	12	5	120	109
Sacred Heart	26	15	8	3	33	92	72	34	16	14	4	111	107
Canisius	26	13	9	4	30	94	71	35	14	17	4	122	114
Connecticut	26	11	10	5	27	86	89	36	13	16	7	104	129
Iona	26	12	12	2	26	92	91	33	13	18	2	111	124
Army	26	9	11	6	24	87	86	35	11	18	6	109	114
American International	26	6	20	0	12	59	112	28	7	21	0	63	119
Fairfield	26	4	19	3	11	53	91	32	6	23	3	72	121
Bentley	26	4	20	2	10	57	121	32	4	26	2	69	150
Championship: Quinnipiac † indicates conference regular season champion * indicates conference tournament champion Final rankings: USA Today/American Hockey Magazine Poll Top 15 Poll

2001–02 Western Collegiate Hockey Association standings
	Conference							Overall					
	GP	W	L	T	PTS	GF	GA	GP	W	L	T	GF	GA
#5 Denver†*	28	21	6	1	43	108	63	41	32	8	1	158	86
#10 St. Cloud State	28	19	7	2	40	117	65	42	29	11	2	179	99
#1 Minnesota	28	18	7	3	39	113	84	44	32	8	4	197	119
#7 Colorado College	28	16	10	2	34	95	74	43	27	13	3	147	97
Wisconsin	28	12	13	3	27	88	90	39	16	19	4	123	120
Minnesota State-Mankato	28	11	15	2	24	84	107	38	16	20	2	124	138
Alaska-Anchorage	28	10	14	4	24	79	96	36	12	19	5	99	125
North Dakota	28	11	15	2	24	103	100	37	16	19	2	134	136
Minnesota-Duluth	28	6	19	3	15	72	112	40	13	24	3	119	153
Michigan Tech	28	4	22	2	10	66	134	38	8	28	2	92	177
Championship: Denver † indicates conference regular season champion * indicates conference tournament champion Final rankings: USA Today/American Hockey Magazine Poll Top 15 Poll

=== Final regular season polls ===
The top 15 teams ranked before the NCAA tournament.

USA Today Poll
Ranking	Team
1	New Hampshire
2	Denver
3	Minnesota
4	Boston University
5	Maine
6	Michigan State
7	Michigan
8	St. Cloud State
9	Cornell
10	Colorado College
11	Northern Michigan
12	Alaska
13	Massachusetts Lowell
14	Ohio State
15	Harvard

USCHO Poll
Ranking	Team
1	New Hampshire
2	Denver
3	Minnesota
4	Michigan State
5	Boston University
6	Maine
7	Michigan
8	St. Cloud State
9	Cornell
10	Colorado College
11	Northern Michigan
12	Alaska
13	Massachusetts Lowell
14	Ohio State
15	Harvard

== 2002 NCAA Tournament ==
First Round	Quarterfinals
1	New Hampshire	–
–	bye	–
1	New Hampshire	4
4	Cornell	3
4	Cornell	6
5	Quinnipiac	1
East Regional
2	Boston University	–
–	bye	–
2	Boston University	3
3	Maine	4
3	Maine	4*
6	Harvard	3
1	Denver	–
–	bye	–
1	Denver	3
4	Michigan	5
4	Michigan	4
5	St. Cloud State	2
West Regional
2	Minnesota	–
–	bye	–
2	Minnesota	4
6	Colorado College	2
3	Michigan State	0
6	Colorado College	2

Frozen Four
E1	New Hampshire	2
E3	Maine	7
W4	Michigan	2
W2	Minnesota	3

National Championship
E3	Maine	3
W2	Minnesota	4*

Note: * denotes overtime period(s)

== Player stats ==
=== Scoring leaders ===
The following players led the league in points at the conclusion of the season.

GP = Games played; G = Goals; A = Assists; Pts = Points; PIM = Penalty minutes

Player	Class	Team	GP	G	A	Pts	PIM
John Pohl	Senior	Minnesota	44	27	52	79	26
Darren Haydar	Senior	New Hampshire	40	31	45	76	28
Mark Hartigan	Junior	St. Cloud State	42	37	38	75	42
Colin Hemingway	Junior	New Hampshire	40	33	33	66	20
Jeff Taffe	Junior	Minnesota	43	34	24	58	86
Chad Theuer	Senior	Northern Michigan	40	16	39	55	28
Marc Cavosie	Junior	Rensselaer	36	23	28	51	44
Judd Medak	Senior	Minnesota-Duluth	40	18	33	51	109
Niko Dimitrakos	Senior	Maine	43	20	31	51	44
Nate DiCasmirro	Senior	St. Cloud State	41	17	33	50	58
Mark Cullen	Senior	Colorado College	43	14	36	50	14
Peter Sejna	Sophomore	Colorado College	43	26	24	50	16
Peter Metcalf	Senior	Maine	44	9	41	50	66
John Shouneyia	Junior	Michigan	44	10	40	50	46

=== Leading goaltenders ===
The following goaltenders led the league in goals against average at the end of the regular season while playing at least 33% of their team's total minutes.

GP = Games played; Min = Minutes played; W = Wins; L = Losses; OT = Overtime/shootout losses; GA = Goals against; SO = Shutouts; SV% = Save percentage; GAA = Goals against average

Player	Class	Team	GP	Min	W	L	OT	GA	SO	SV%	GAA
David LeNeveu	Freshman	Cornell	14	842	11	2	1	21	2	.936	1.50
Wade Dubielewicz	Junior	Denver	24	1430	20	4	0	41	2	.943	1.72
Ryan Miller	Junior	Michigan State	40	2411	26	9	5	71	8	.936	1.77
Matt Underhill	Senior	Cornell	21	1334	14	6	1	40	3	.922	1.80
Yann Danis	Sophomore	Brown	24	1450	11	10	2	45	3	.938	1.86
Cam McCormick	Senior	Massachusetts-Lowell	24	1372	13	6	3	43	6	.920	1.88
Mike Morrison	Senior	Maine	30	1645	20	3	4	60	2	.921	2.19
Dean Weasler	Senior	St. Cloud State	32	1727	21	6	2	64	3	.923	2.22
Josh Blackburn	Senior	Michigan	43	2567	27	11	5	97	5	.904	2.27
Peter Aubry	Senior	Mercyhurst	29	1683	19	7	2	64	4	.925	2.28

== Awards ==
=== NCAA ===
Award		Recipient
Hobey Baker Memorial Award		Jordan Leopold, Minnesota
Spencer T. Penrose Award (Coach of the Year)		Tim Whitehead, Maine
Most Outstanding Player in NCAA Tournament		Grant Potulny, Minnesota
AHCA All-American Teams
East First Team	Position	West First Team
Matt Underhill, Cornell	G	Ryan Miller, Michigan State
Jim Fahey, Northeastern	D	Mike Komisarek, Michigan
Douglas Murray, Cornell	D	Jordan Leopold, Minnesota
Marc Cavosie, Rensselaer	F	Mike Cammalleri, Michigan
Darren Haydar, New Hampshire	F	Mark Hartigan, St. Cloud State
Colin Hemingway, New Hampshire	F	John Pohl, Minnesota
East Second Team	Position	West Second Team
Yann Danis, Brown	G	Wade Dubielewicz, Denver
Chris Dyment, Boston University	D	Andrew Hutchinson, Michigan State
Peter Metcalf, Maine	D	John-Michael Liles, Michigan State
	D	Greg Zanon, Nebraska-Omaha
Niko Dimitrakos, Maine	F	Rob Collins, Ferris State
Ben Eaves, Boston College	F	Mark Cullen, Colorado College
Matt Murley, Rensselaer	F	Jeff Hoggan, Nebraska-Omaha

=== CCHA ===
Awards		Recipient
Player of the Year		Ryan Miller, Michigan State
Best Defensive Forward		Bobby Andrews, Alaska-Fairbanks
Best Defensive Defenseman		Mike Komisarek, Michigan
Best Offensive Defenseman		John-Michael Liles, Michigan State
Rookie of the Year		Pat Dwyer, Western Michigan
Goaltender of the Year		Ryan Miller, Michigan State
Coach of the Year		Guy Gadowsky, Alaska-Fairbanks
Terry Flanagan Memorial Award		Scott Titus, Ohio State
Ilitch Humanitarian Award		Kevin O'Malley, Michigan
Most Valuable Player in Tournament		Mike Cammalleri, Michigan
All-CCHA Teams
First Team	Position	Second Team
Ryan Miller, Michigan State	G	Dan Ellis, Nebraska-Omaha
John-Michael Liles, Michigan State	D	Andrew Hutchinson, Michigan State
Mike Komisarek, Michigan	D	Greg Zanon, Nebraska-Omaha
Jeff Hoggan, Nebraska-Omaha	F	Mike Cammalleri, Michigan
Chris Kunitz, Ferris State	F	Bobby Andrews, Alaska-Fairbanks
Rob Collins, Ferris State	F	John Shouneyia, Michigan
Rookie Team	Position	
Mike Brown, Ferris State	G	
Eric Werner, Michigan	D	
Matt York, Ferris State	D	
Pat Dwyer, Western Michigan	F	
Eric Nystrom, Michigan	F	
Jim Slater, Michigan State	F	
Aaron Voros, Alaska-Fairbanks	F	

=== CHA ===
Award		Recipient
Player of the Year		David Guerrera, Wayne State
Rookie of the Year		Riley Riddell, Bemidji State
Coach of the Year		Bill Wilkinson, Wayne State
Student-Athlete of the Year		Brian Gornick, Air Force
Most Valuable Player in Tournament		Dustin Kingston, Wayne State
All-CHA Teams
First Team	Position	Second Team
David Guerrera, Wayne State	G	Grady Hunt, Bemidji State
Tyler Kindle, Wayne State	D	Scott Crawford, Niagara
Tyler Butler, Alabama-Huntsville	D	Brant Somerville, Findlay
Jason Durbin, Wayne State	F	Chris Vail, Wayne State
Marty Goulet, Bemidji State	F	Riley Riddell, Bemidji State
Derek Olson, Air Force	F	Rigel Shaw, Findlay
	F	Steve Cherlebois, Air Force
Rookie Team	Position	
Zach Sikich, Alabama-Huntsville	G	
Doug Watkins, Alabama-Huntsville	D	
Anders Olsson, Bemidji State	D	
Jared Ross, Alabama-Huntsville	F	
Andrew Murray, Bemidji State	F	
Riley Riddell, Bemidji State	F	
Rigel Shaw, Findlay	F	

=== ECAC ===
Award		Recipient
Player of the Year		Marc Cavosie, Rensselaer
Rookie of the Year		Chris Higgins, Yale
Coach of the Year		Mike Schafer, Cornell
Best Defensive Forward		Stephen Bâby, Cornell
Best Defensive Defenseman		Brian McMeekin, Cornell
Ken Dryden Award		Matt Underhill, Cornell
Most Outstanding Player in Tournament		Tyler Kolarik, Harvard
All-ECAC Hockey Teams
First Team	Position	Second Team
Matt Underhill, Cornell	G	Yann Danis, Brown
Kerry Ellis-Toddington, Clarkson	D	Trevor Byrne, Dartmouth
Douglas Murray, Cornell	D	Mark McRae, Cornell
Marc Cavosie, Rensselaer	F	Stephen Bâby, Cornell
Mike Maturo, Dartmouth	F	Chris Higgins, Yale
Matt Murley, Rensselaer	F	Brett Nowak, Harvard
Rookie Team	Position	
David LeNeveu, Cornell	G	
Randy Jones, Clarkson	D	
Noah Welch, Harvard	D	
Chris Higgins, Yale	F	
Jordan Webb, Union	F	
Lee Stempniak, Dartmouth	F	

=== Hockey East ===
Award		Recipient
Player of the Year		Darren Haydar, New Hampshire
Rookie of the Year		Sean Collins, New Hampshire
Bob Kullen Coach of the Year Award		Dick Umile, New Hampshire
Len Ceglarski Sportsmanship Award		Jon DiSalvatore, Providence
Best Defensive Forward		Mike Pandolfo, Boston University
Best Defensive Defenseman		Chris Dyment, Boston University
Three-Stars Award		Colin Hemingway, New Hampshire
William Flynn Tournament Most Valuable Player		Darren Haydar, New Hampshire
All-Hockey East Teams
First Team	Position	Second Team
Mike Morrison, Maine	G	Mike Ayers, New Hampshire
Jim Fahey, Northeastern	D	Chris Dyment, Boston University
Peter Metcalf, Maine	D	Garrett Stafford, New Hampshire
Darren Haydar, New Hampshire	F	Niko Dimitrakos, Maine
Colin Hemingway, New Hampshire	F	Ben Eaves, Boston College
Tony Voce, Boston College	F	Ed McGrane, Massachusetts-Lowell
Rookie Team	Position	
Keni Gibson, Northeastern	G	
Ryan Whitney, Boston University	D	
Sean Collins, New Hampshire	F	
Brian McConnell, Boston University	F	
Colin Shields, Maine	F	
Dave Spina, Boston College	F	

=== MAAC ===
Award		Recipient
Offensive Player of the Year		Patrick Rissmiller, Holy Cross
Defensive Player of the Year		Steve Tobio, Bentley
Goaltender of the Year		Peter Aubry, Mercyhurst
Offensive Rookie of the Year		Chris Casey, Army
Defensive Rookie of the Year		Jamie Holden, Quinnipiac
Coach of the Year		Paul Pearl, Holy Cross
Tournament Most Valuable Player		Matt Craig, Quinnipiac
All-MAAC Teams
First Team	Position	Second Team
Peter Aubry, Mercyhurst	G	Eddy Ferhi, Sacred Heart
Steve Tobio, Bentley	D	Nathan Lutz, Iona
Mike Boylan, Connecticut	D	R.J. Irving, Holy Cross
Patrick Rissmiller, Holy Cross	F	Brandon Doria, Holy Cross
Louis Goulet, Mercyhurst	F	Brian Herbert, Quinnipiac
Ryan Carter, Iona	F	Martin Paquet, Sacred Heart
	F	Adam Tackaberry, Mercyhurst
Rookie Team	Position	
Jamie Holden, Quinnipiac	G	
T. J. Kemp, Mercyhurst	D	
Adam Rhein, Connecticut	D	
Chris Casey, Army	F	
Bryan Goodwin, Bentley	F	
Rich Hanson, Mercyhurst	F	
Brent Williams, Iona	F	

=== WCHA ===
Award		Recipient
Player of the Year		Mark Hartigan, St. Cloud State
Defensive Player of the Year		Jordan Leopold, Minnesota
Rookie of the Year		Brandon Bochenski, North Dakota
Student-Athlete of the Year		Mark Cullen, Colorado College
Coach of the Year		George Gwozdecky, Denver
Most Valuable Player in Tournament		Wade Dubielewicz, Denver
All-WCHA Teams
First Team	Position	Second Team
Wade Dubielewicz, Denver	G	Dean Weasler, St. Cloud State
Jordan Leopold, Minnesota	D	Matt Shasby, Alaska-Anchorage
Andy Reierson, Minnesota-Duluth	D	Paul Martin, Minnesota
Mark Hartigan, St. Cloud State	F	Ryan Bayda, North Dakota
John Pohl, Minnesota	F	Nate DiCasmirro, St. Cloud State
Mark Cullen, Colorado College	F	Judd Medak, Minnesota-Duluth
Third Team	Position	Rookie Team
Adam Berkhoel, Denver	G	Bernd Brückler, Wisconsin
Tom Preissing, Colorado College	D	Keith Ballard, Minnesota
Aaron MacKenzie, Denver	D	Matt Gens, St. Cloud State
Jeff Taffe, Minnesota	F	Mike Doyle, St. Cloud State
Connor James, Denver	F	Brandon Bochenski, North Dakota
Peter Sejna, Colorado College	F	Peter Szabo, St. Cloud State

== 2002 NHL entry draft ==
Round	Pick	Player	College	Conference	NHL team
1	5	Ryan Whitney	Boston University	Hockey East	Pittsburgh Penguins
1	10	Eric Nystrom	Michigan	CCHA	Calgary Flames
1	11	Keith Ballard	Minnesota	WCHA	Buffalo Sabres
1	14	Chris Higgins	Yale	ECAC Hockey	Montreal Canadiens
1	27	Mike Morris ^{†}	Northeastern	Hockey East	San Jose Sharks
1	30	Jim Slater	Michigan State	CCHA	Atlanta Thrashers
2	33	Lee Falardeau ^{†}	Michigan State	CCHA	New York Rangers
2	39	Brian McConnell	Boston University	Hockey East	Calgary Flames
2	40	Rob Globke	Notre Dame	CCHA	Florida Panthers
2	44	Matt Greene ^{†}	North Dakota	WCHA	Edmonton Oilers
2	46	David LeNeveu	Cornell	ECAC Hockey	Phoenix Coyotes
2	52	Dan Spang ^{†}	Boston University	Hockey East	Phoenix Coyotes
2	53	Barry Tallackson	Minnesota	WCHA	New Jersey Devils
2	54	Duncan Keith	Michigan State	CCHA	Chicago Blackhawks
3	64	Jason Ryznar	Michigan	CCHA	New Jersey Devils
3	68	Brett Skinner ^{†}	Denver	WCHA	Vancouver Canucks
3	70	Joe Callahan	Yale	ECAC Hockey	Phoenix Coyotes
3	72	Mike Erickson	Minnesota	WCHA	Minnesota Wild
3	78	Geoff Waugh ^{†}	Northern Michigan	WCHA	Dallas Stars
3	79	Brock Radunske	Michigan State	CCHA	Edmonton Oilers
3	80	Matt Jones	North Dakota	WCHA	Phoenix Coyotes
3	82	John Adams	Boston College	Hockey East	Buffalo Sabres
3	91	Jesse Lane ^{‡}	Harvard	ECAC Hockey	Carolina Hurricanes
3	94	Eric Lundberg	Providence	Hockey East	Colorado Avalanche
3	96	Jeff Genovy ^{†}	Clarkson	ECAC Hockey	Columbus Blue Jackets
4	114	John Laliberte ^{†}	Boston University	Hockey East	Vancouver Canucks
4	116	Patrick Dwyer	Western Michigan	CCHA	Atlanta Thrashers
4	119	Jēkabs Rēdlihs ^{†}	Boston University	Hockey East	Columbus Blue Jackets
4	127	Nate Guenin ^{†}	Ohio State	CCHA	New York Rangers
4	129	Tom Gilbert ^{†}	Wisconsin	WCHA	Colorado Avalanche
5	132	John Zeiler ^{†}	St. Lawrence	ECAC Hockey	Phoenix Coyotes
5	135	Joe Pearce ^{†}	Boston College	Hockey East	Tampa Bay Lightning
5	136	Andy Sertich ^{†}	Minnesota	WCHA	Pittsburgh Penguins
5	143	Mike Walsh ^{†}	Notre Dame	CCHA	New York Rangers
5	148	Glenn Fisher ^{†}	Denver	WCHA	Edmonton Oilers
5	150	Brock Hooton ^{†}	St. Cloud State	WCHA	Ottawa Senators
5	152	Greg Hogeboom	Miami	CCHA	Los Angeles Kings
5	157	Joel Andresen ^{†}	Nebraska–Omaha	CCHA	Los Angeles Kings
5	158	Vince Bellissimo ^{†}	Western Michigan	CCHA	Florida Panthers
5	161	Dov Grumet-Morris	Harvard	ECAC Hockey	Philadelphia Flyers
5	163	Tom Walsh	Harvard	ECAC Hockey	San Jose Sharks
5	165	Justin Maiser	Boston University	Hockey East	St. Louis Blues
6	170	P. J. Atherton ^{†}	Minnesota	WCHA	Tampa Bay Lightning
6	171	Bobby Goepfert ^{†}	Providence	Hockey East	Pittsburgh Penguins
6	172	Mike McKenna	St. Lawrence	ECAC Hockey	Nashville Predators
6	175	Matt Foy	Merrimack	Hockey East	Minnesota Wild
6	176	Curtis McElhinney	Colorado College	WCHA	Calgary Flames
6	177	Jake Taylor ^{†}	Minnesota	WCHA	New York Rangers
6	185	Ryan Murphy	Boston College	Hockey East	Los Angeles Kings
6	186	Jeff Pietrasiak ^{†}	New Hampshire	Hockey East	Phoenix Coyotes
6	193	Joey Mormina	Colgate	ECAC Hockey	Philadelphia Flyers
6	195	Taylor Christie	Bowling Green	CCHA	Colorado Avalanche
7	198	Nathan Oystrick ^{†}	Northern Michigan	WCHA	Atlanta Thrashers
7	199	Greg Mauldin	Massachusetts	Hockey East	Columbus Blue Jackets
7	206	David Van der Gulik ^{†}	Boston University	Hockey East	Calgary Flames
7	211	Patrick Murphy ^{†}	Northern Michigan	WCHA	Edmonton Oilers
7	217	Tim Conboy ^{†}	St. Cloud State	WCHA	San Jose Sharks
7	222	Scott May	Ohio State	CCHA	Toronto Maple Leafs
7	226	Joey Crabb ^{†}	Colorado College	WCHA	New York Rangers
7	227	Ryan Steeves	Yale	ECAC Hockey	Colorado Avalanche
8	230	Colton Fretter ^{†}	Michigan State	CCHA	Atlanta Thrashers
8	232	Peter Hafner	Harvard	ECAC Hockey	Florida Panthers
8	235	Kaleb Betts ^{†}	Nebraska–Omaha	CCHA	Nashville Predators
8	239	Ryan Lannon	Harvard	ECAC Hockey	Pittsburgh Penguins
8	244	Dwight Helminen	Michigan	CCHA	Edmonton Oilers
8	247	Matt Violin	Lake Superior State	CCHA	Vancouver Canucks
8	250	Dan Glover ^{†}	Cornell	ECAC Hockey	New Jersey Devils
8	259	Yan Stastny	Notre Dame	CCHA	Boston Bruins
9	270	Rob Flynn	Harvard	ECAC Hockey	New York Rangers
9	273	Ned Havern	Boston College	Hockey East	Dallas Stars
9	278	Matt Gens	St. Cloud State	WCHA	Vancouver Canucks
9	279	Connor James	Denver	WCHA	Los Angeles Kings
9	280	Russell Spence ^{†}	Alaska–Fairbanks	CCHA	Phoenix Coyotes
9	282	Adam Burish ^{†}	Wisconsin	WCHA	Chicago Blackhawks
9	284	Ryan MacMurchy ^{†}	Wisconsin	WCHA	St. Louis Blues
9	287	John Toffey	Ohio State	CCHA	Tampa Bay Lightning
9	288	Michael Hutchins ^{†}	New Hampshire	Hockey East	San Jose Sharks
9	289	Sean Collins	New Hampshire	Hockey East	Colorado Avalanche

† incoming freshman
‡ Lane left school during the season

== See also ==
- 2001–02 NCAA Division III men's ice hockey season
