= Matt Murley =

American ice hockey player (born 1979)

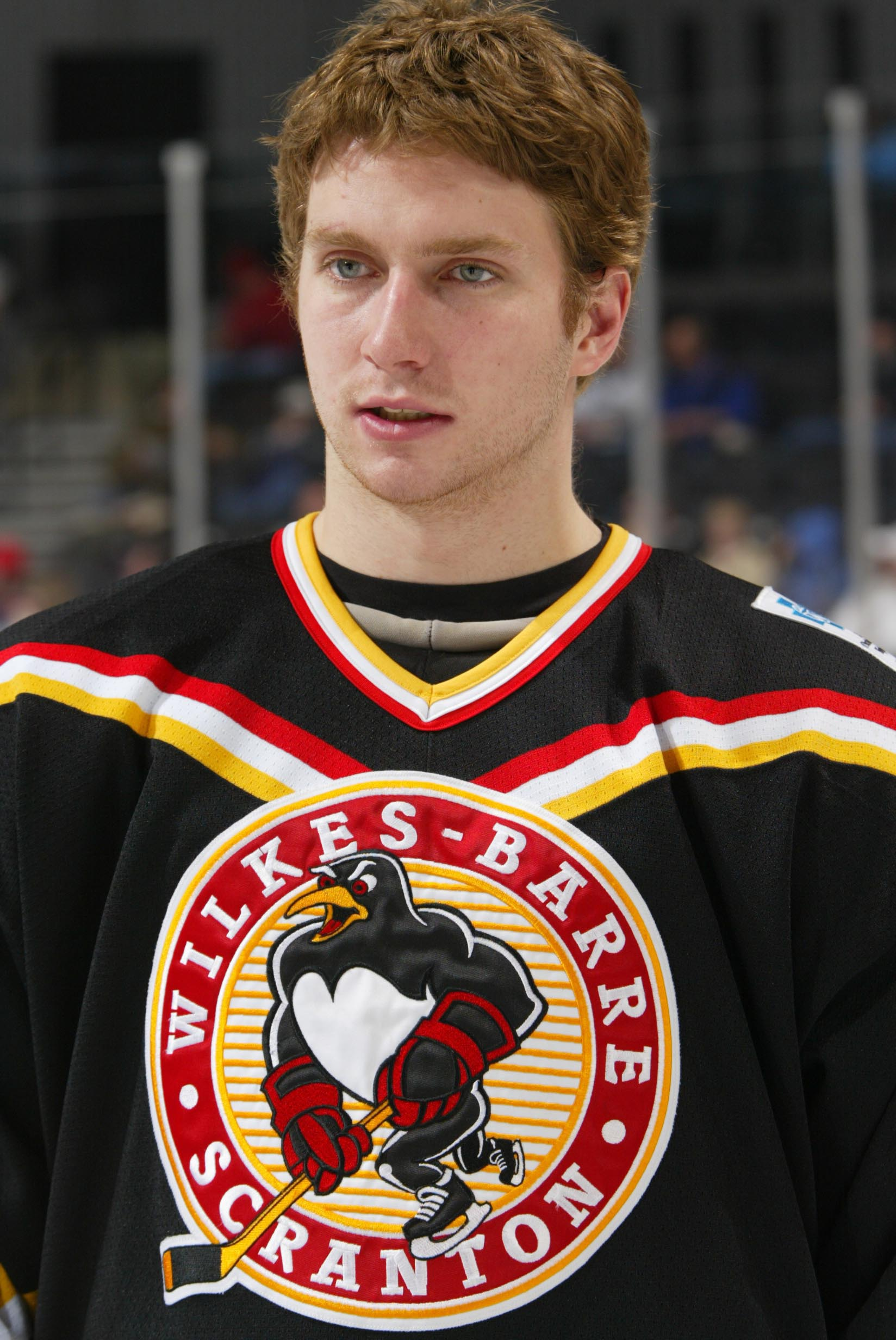
- Murley with the Wilkes-Barre/Scranton Penguins in 2004
- Born: December 17, 1979 (age 46) Troy, New York, U.S.
- Height: 5 ft 11 in (180 cm)
- Weight: 206 lb (93 kg; 14 st 10 lb)
- Position: Left wing
- Shot: Left
- Played for: Pittsburgh Penguins; Phoenix Coyotes; Amur Khabarovsk; HC Lugano; Rapperswil-Jona Lakers; Linköpings HC; Timrå IK; KHL Medveščak Zagreb; HC Slovan Bratislava; Thomas Sabo Ice Tigers; Oji Eagles; Daemyung Killer Whales
- NHL draft: 51st overall, 1999; Pittsburgh Penguins
- Playing career: 2002–2022

Matt Murley (born December 17, 1979) is an American former professional ice hockey forward who played with the Pittsburgh Penguins and Phoenix Coyotes in the National Hockey League (NHL). He is currently a Sports betting expert for Barstool Sports' hockey podcast, Spittin' Chiclets and appears on the spin-off podcast Chiclets Game Notes with former teammate Colby Armstrong.

== Playing career ==
As a youth, Murley played in the 1993 Quebec International Pee-Wee Hockey Tournament with a minor ice hockey team from Syracuse, New York.

Before his professional career, Murley played college hockey for four seasons at the Rensselaer Polytechnic Institute in Troy, NY. He was drafted in the 2nd round (51st overall) by the Pittsburgh Penguins in the 1999 NHL entry draft, although he did not choose to report to Pittsburgh until 2002. Murley played with the Wilkes-Barre/Scranton Penguins of the American Hockey League (AHL) before being called up for the 2003–2004 season.

In 2006, Murley's contract with Pittsburgh terminated and Murley signed as a free-agent with the Colorado Avalanche. After playing a full season with Colorado's then AHL affiliate, Albany River Rats, Murley's one-year deal expired and on July 20, 2007, he signed a one-year contract with the Phoenix Coyotes. After splitting the season between Phoenix and their AHL affiliate, the San Antonio Rampage, Murley signed a one-year deal with the Carolina Hurricanes. He was expected to be spending more time near his hometown of Troy as he was expected to join the then-Carolina AHL affiliate Albany River Rats for a second time. As expected, Carolina reassigned Murley to the AHL's Albany River Rats. However, instead of joining Albany, Murley informed the Hurricanes that he was signing with Khabarovsk Amur, of the Kontinental Hockey League (KHL) in Russia. Murley signed with Khabarovsk on October 9, 2009 and finished his season in the KHL.

On October 6, 2009, Murley signed with Langenthal of the Swiss National League B (NLB) in Switzerland. He has also played for Lugano of the Swiss National League A (NLA) and the Rapperswil-Jona Lakers of the NLA.

On September 1, 2010, Murley signed a two-month contract with the Swedish Elite League (SEL) club Linköpings HC. On October 19, 2010 the tryout contract was terminated. On November 25, 2010, Murley signed a two-month contract with Timrå IK. Murley finished the season with fifteen points in thirty-two games.

On January 20, 2011, Murley signed an extension with Timrå IK that would keep him on the team throughout the 2011-12 Elitserien season. Murley was extended because he was "a player that fits in all situations and because he fit in well with Timrå IK".

On July 9, 2013, Murley signed as a free agent to a contract with the newest member of Kontinental Hockey League, KHL Medveščak Zagreb from Croatia. He joined fellow KHL team HC Slovan Bratislava of Slovakia for the 2014-15 season.

Murley headed to the German top-tier Deutsche Eishockey Liga (DEL) for the 2015-16 season, agreeing to terms with the Nürnberg Ice Tigers. He left Nürnberg in the summer of 2016 and signed with Japanese side Oji Eagles in July 2016. After one season with the Eagles, Murley continued in the Asian League, playing his last two professional seasons with South Korean Incheon-based team Daemyung Killer Whales.

After being retired for 2 1/2 years, Murley returned to pro hockey finishing the 2021-22 season for Kovlands Ishockeyförening in the Swedish second division.

== Career statistics ==
			Regular season					Playoffs
Season	Team	League	GP	G	A	Pts	PIM	GP	G	A	Pts	PIM
1996–97	Syracuse Jr. Crunch	MetJHL	48	52	58	110	111	—	—	—	—	—
1997–98	Syracuse Jr. Crunch	MetJHL	49	56	70	126	203	—	—	—	—	—
1998–99	R.P.I.	ECAC	36	17	32	49	32	—	—	—	—	—
1999–00	R.P.I.	ECAC	35	9	29	38	42	—	—	—	—	—
2000–01	R.P.I.	ECAC	34	24	18	42	34	—	—	—	—	—
2001–02	R.P.I.	ECAC	32	24	22	46	26	—	—	—	—	—
2002–03	Wilkes-Barre/Scranton Penguins	AHL	73	21	37	58	45	6	0	2	2	15
2003–04	Pittsburgh Penguins	NHL	18	1	1	2	14	—	—	—	—	—
2003–04	Wilkes-Barre/Scranton Penguins	AHL	63	10	26	36	69	24	7	6	13	17
2004–05	Wilkes-Barre/Scranton Penguins	AHL	80	17	24	41	55	11	3	0	3	0
2005–06	Pittsburgh Penguins	NHL	41	1	5	6	24	—	—	—	—	—
2006–07	Albany River Rats	AHL	61	23	32	55	18	5	1	5	6	8
2007–08	San Antonio Rampage	AHL	76	21	41	62	43	7	2	2	4	0
2007–08	Phoenix Coyotes	NHL	3	0	1	1	0	—	—	—	—	—
2008–09	Amur Khabarovsk	KHL	33	4	4	8	28	—	—	—	—	—
2009–10	SC Langenthal	NLB	22	8	15	23	18	—	—	—	—	—
2009–10	HC Lugano	NLA	3	1	1	2	4	—	—	—	—	—
2009–10	Rapperswil-Jona Lakers	NLA	11	6	6	12	8	—	—	—	—	—
2010–11	Linköpings HC	SEL	12	3	5	8	0	—	—	—	—	—
2010–11	Timrå IK	SEL	32	9	6	15	36	—	—	—	—	—
2011–12	Timrå IK	SEL	55	15	16	31	16	—	—	—	—	—
2012–13	Timrå IK	SEL	13	5	8	13	22	—	—	—	—	—
2013–14	KHL Medveščak Zagreb	KHL	52	16	20	36	6	3	1	1	2	2
2014–15	HC Slovan Bratislava	KHL	46	11	13	24	75	—	—	—	—	—
2015–16	Thomas Sabo Ice Tigers	DEL	51	9	16	25	26	12	2	1	3	8
2016–17	Oji Eagles	AL	48	19	44	63	30	2	1	1	2	0
2017–18	Daemyung Killer Whales	AL	28	13	24	37	16	—	—	—	—	—
2018–19	Daemyung Killer Whales	AL	31	7	7	14	16	3	0	2	2	0
NHL totals			62	2	7	9	38	—	—	—	—	—

== Awards and honors ==
Award	Year
College
All-ECAC Hockey Rookie Team	1998–99
All-ECAC Hockey First Team	2001–02
AHCA East Second-Team All-American	2001–02
ECAC Hockey All-Tournament Team	2002
AHL
All-Star Game	2004
