= Douglas Murray (ice hockey) =

Swedish ice hockey player

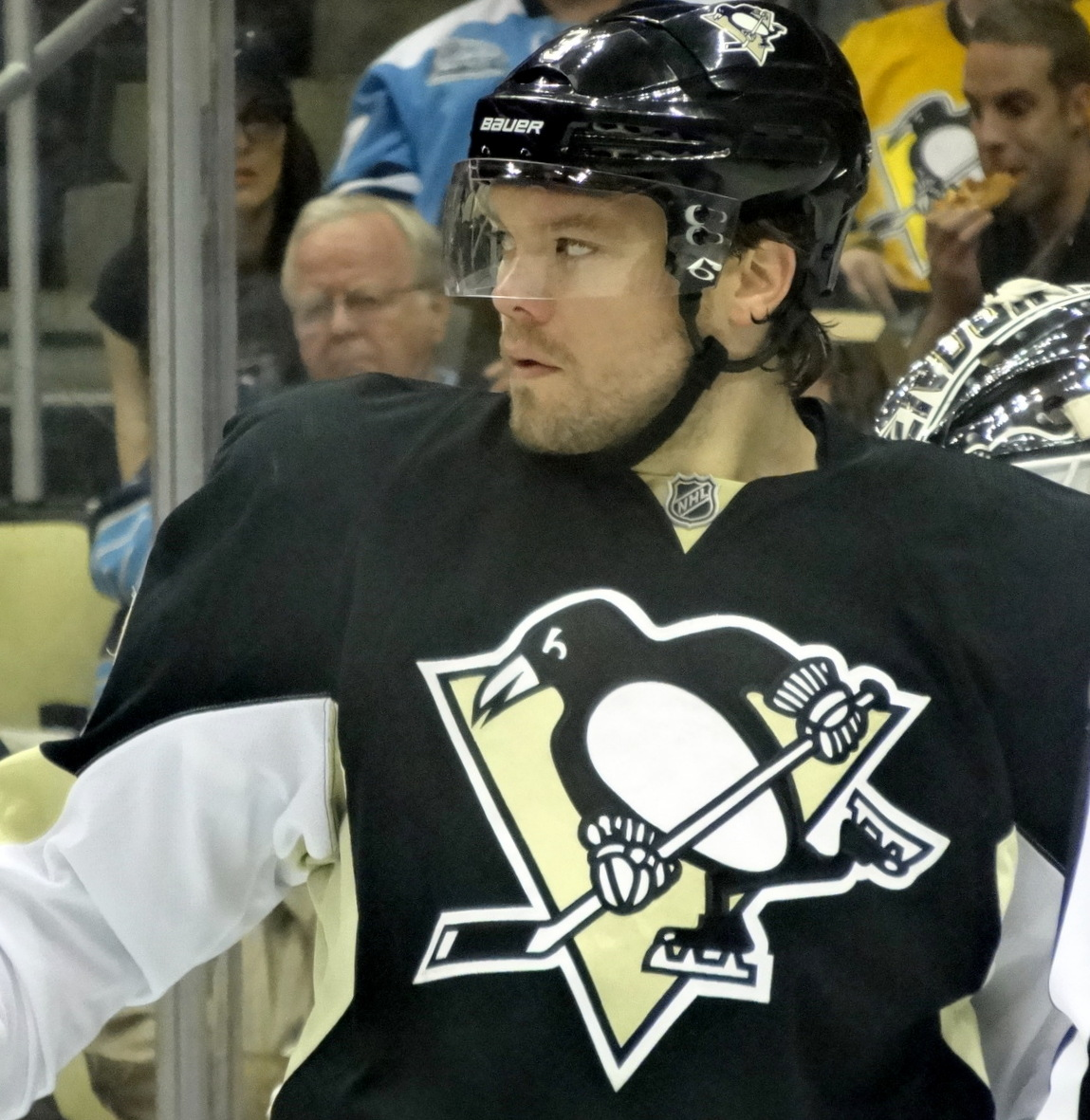
- With the Penguins during the 2013 playoffs.
- Born: 12 March 1980 (age 46) Stockholm, Sweden
- Height: 6 ft 3 in (191 cm)
- Weight: 240 lb (109 kg; 17 st 2 lb)
- Position: Defence
- Shot: Left
- Played for: San Jose Sharks; Pittsburgh Penguins; Montreal Canadiens; Kölner Haie
- National team: Sweden
- NHL draft: 241st overall, 1999; San Jose Sharks
- Playing career: 2003–2016

Douglas Thomas Lars Murray (born 12 March 1980), nicknamed "Crankshaft", is a Swedish former professional ice hockey defenceman. He was drafted in the eighth round, 241st overall by the San Jose Sharks in the 1999 NHL entry draft.

== Early life ==
Murray's Swedish mother is a daughter of Lasse Björn, an ice hockey defenceman, two-time world champion and Olympic bronze medalist. His father's ancestors originate from Scotland. While his cousins all have Swedish names, his parents gave their children Scottish or English names. Murray's brothers are named Charles and Ted, and a sister is named Roseanna.

Murray attended Portledge School in Locust Valley, New York, for his junior and senior years of high school, and played for the New York Apple Core in nearby Long Beach, before attending Cornell University. He graduated from Cornell in 2003 with a B.S. degree in hotel administration.

== Playing career ==
From 1999–2000 to 2002–03, he played for Cornell University. While at Cornell, he served as captain his senior year and was twice named a first team All-American. He was nominated to the Hobey Baker Memorial Award Final Ten in 2003. In the 2003–04 and the locked-out 2004–05 season he played for San Jose's minor league affiliate, the Cleveland Barons, and contributed both offensively and defensively, leading the team in plus/minus and being second on the team in points for a defenseman. He also served as an alternate captain. He was awarded the Cleveland Barons Rubbermaid "Player of the Year" (along with Josh Gorges) in 2005.

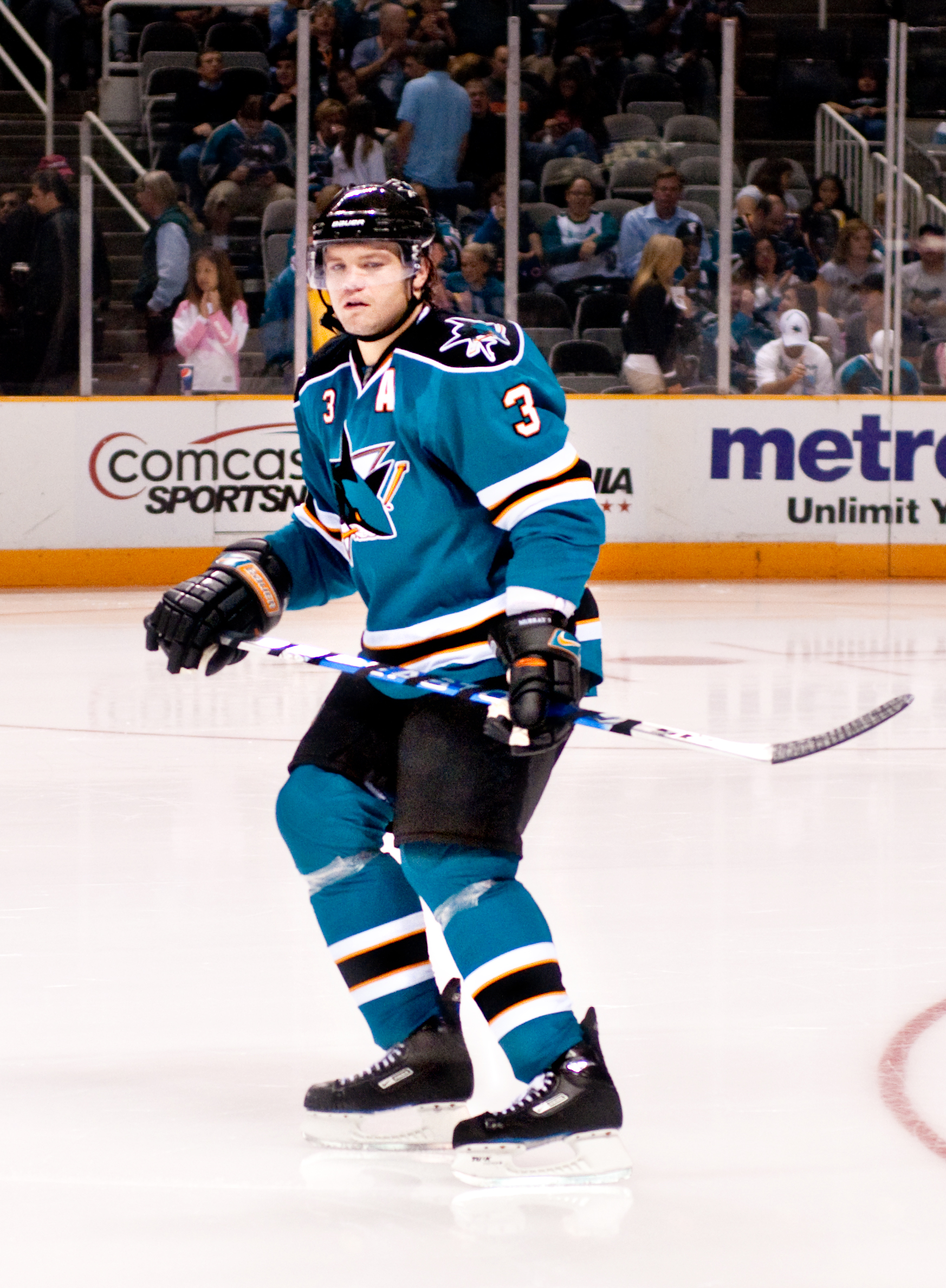
With the San Jose Sharks

During the 2005–06 NHL season, he was called up to San Jose, due to various injuries plaguing the team's defense. In his short time there that season, he gained praise for his physical presence, as well as solid defense, from such San Jose organization members as TV color commentator Drew Remenda.

Murray renewed his contract with the Sharks in June 2006, signing a three-year deal worth US$1.65 million. Part of that deal was a $150,000 signing bonus. In late September 2008, he agreed to a four-year contract extension with the Sharks supposedly worth US$10 million.

His first NHL goal was scored in his 115th career game on 21 February 2008, against Martin Biron of the Philadelphia Flyers.

In the pre-season game of 26 September 2009, Murray performed a hat trick, scoring 3 even strength goals against the Anaheim Ducks, leading to the 6–0 shutout victory, though it was unofficial due to it being in the pre-season. If it had been in the regular season, it would have been his first and only career NHL hat trick.

In 2010, he was chosen as the 16th-smartest athlete in sports by Sporting News.

On 25 March 2013, the Sharks traded Murray to the Pittsburgh Penguins for Pittsburgh's second round pick in the 2013 draft and a conditional second round pick in 2014. The Sharks later received the conditional pick due to Pittsburgh's progression through two rounds in the 2013 Stanley Cup playoffs.

On 22 August 2013, Murray signed as a free agent to a one-year contract worth $1.5 million with the Montreal Canadiens.

He was not re-signed by the Canadiens at the end of his contract and unable to attract NHL interest, signed a one-year deal with Kölner Haie of the Deutsche Eishockey Liga on 20 January 2015. In the 2014–15 season, Murray was limited to just 8 appearances with the Kölner Haie before suffering injury. On 13 March 2015, Murray returned to North America and signed a professional try-out contract to practice with the Calgary Flames.

Murray announced his retirement on 21 October 2016.

== International play ==
During the 2008 IIHF World Championship, Murray checked Russian player Aleksey Morozov out of the game. Morozov suffered a severe concussion, while Murray received a match penalty.

Murray represented Sweden in the 2010 Winter Olympics in Vancouver.

== Personal life ==
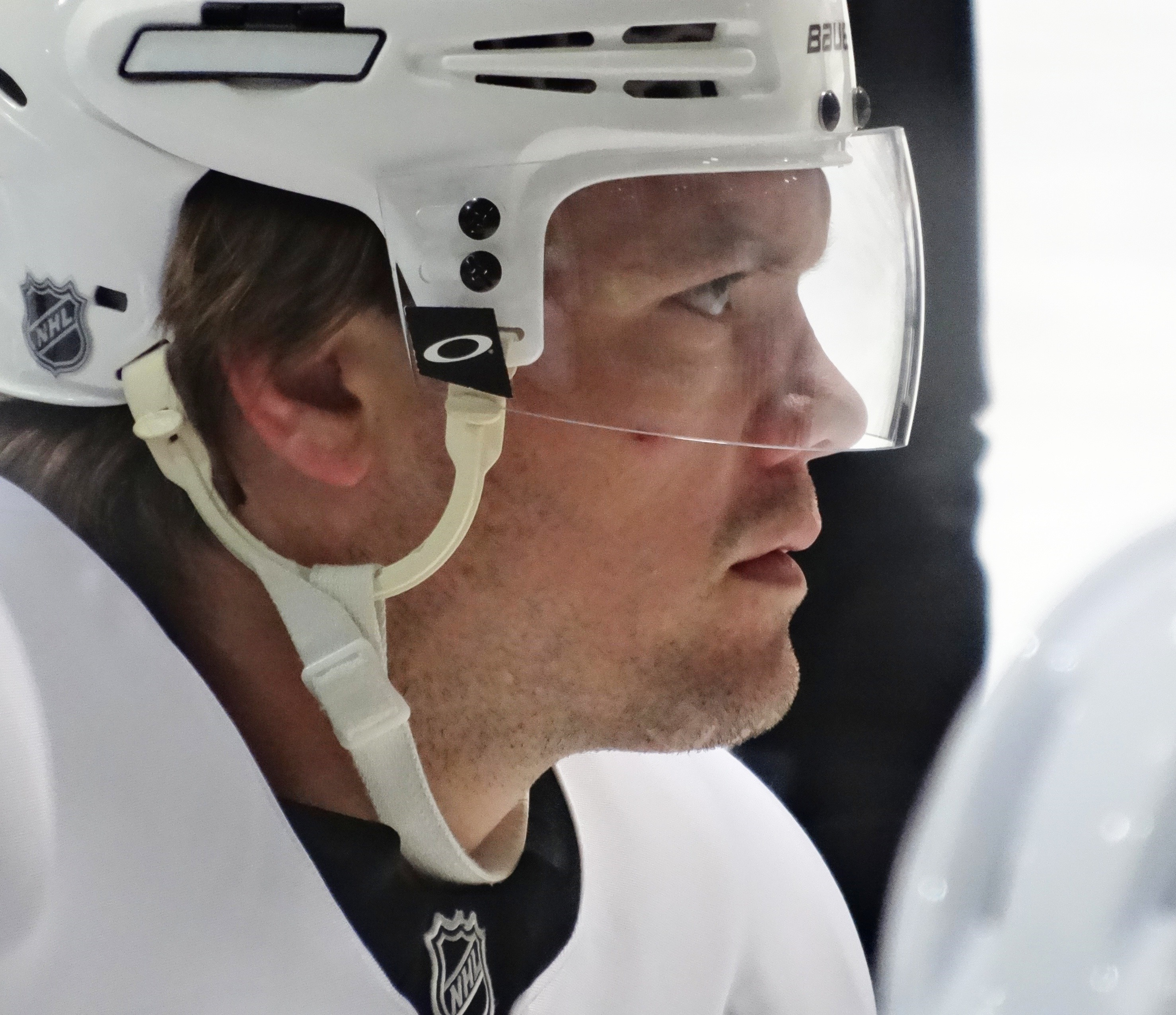
At practice with the Penguins in 2013.

As of the fourth season of the Parneviks reality show in 2018, Murray was in a relationship with Penny Parnevik (born 1997), daughter of professional golfer Jesper Parnevik. On 1 February 2019 the couple were engaged. Their son, named Atticus, was born in 2019. The couple married in June 2022.

Murray is the co-founder and managing partner of Uber Dispensing Co, which manufactures the UberTap, a hands-free three-spout keg tap invented by Murray and several friends from Cornell. Coincidentally, while Murray represented Sweden in ice hockey at the 2010 Vancouver Olympics, another of the company's co-founders, Jamie Moriarty, represented the U.S. in four-man bobsled at the same Olympics. He rang the bell at the New York Mercantile Exchange in the summer of 2006.

As of 24 April 2019 Murray was pursuing several business ventures in Northern California and serving as president and director of the Sharks Alumni Foundation.

== Career statistics ==
=== Regular season and playoffs ===
			Regular season					Playoffs
Season	Team	League	GP	G	A	Pts	PIM	GP	G	A	Pts	PIM
1996–97	Djurgårdens IF	J20	4	0	0	0	6	—	—	—	—	—
1998–99	New York Apple Core	EJHL	60	17	47	64	62	—	—	—	—	—
1999–00	Cornell Big Red	ECAC	32	3	6	9	38	—	—	—	—	—
2000–01	Cornell Big Red	ECAC	25	5	13	18	39	—	—	—	—	—
2001–02	Cornell Big Red	ECAC	35	11	21	32	67	—	—	—	—	—
2002–03	Cornell Big Red	ECAC	35	5	20	25	30	—	—	—	—	—
2003–04	Cleveland Barons	AHL	72	10	12	22	75	9	3	0	3	37
2004–05	Cleveland Barons	AHL	54	6	17	23	56	—	—	—	—	—
2005–06	Cleveland Barons	AHL	20	1	7	8	37	—	—	—	—	—
2005–06	San Jose Sharks	NHL	34	0	1	1	27	—	—	—	—	—
2006–07	San Jose Sharks	NHL	35	0	3	3	31	—	—	—	—	—
2006–07	Worcester Sharks	AHL	5	2	1	3	8	—	—	—	—	—
2007–08	San Jose Sharks	NHL	66	1	9	10	98	13	1	1	2	2
2008–09	San Jose Sharks	NHL	75	0	7	7	38	6	0	0	0	9
2009–10	San Jose Sharks	NHL	79	4	13	17	66	15	1	6	7	8
2010–11	San Jose Sharks	NHL	73	1	13	14	44	18	0	1	1	8
2011–12	San Jose Sharks	NHL	60	0	4	4	31	5	0	0	0	19
2012–13	Djurgårdens IF	Allsv	14	1	2	3	36	—	—	—	—	—
2012–13	San Jose Sharks	NHL	29	0	3	3	26	—	—	—	—	—
2012–13	Pittsburgh Penguins	NHL	14	1	2	3	9	15	2	1	3	32
2013–14	Montreal Canadiens	NHL	53	0	2	2	42	3	0	0	0	0
2014–15	Kölner Haie	DEL	8	0	1	1	24	—	—	—	—	—
NHL totals			518	7	57	64	412	75	4	9	13	78

=== International ===
Year	Team	Event	Result	GP	G	A	Pts	PIM
2008	Sweden	WC	4th	5	0	0	0	27
2010	Sweden	OG	5th	4	0	0	0	0
Senior totals				9	0	0	0	27

== Awards and honors ==
Award	Year
ECAC Hockey All-Tournament Team	2001
All-ECAC Hockey First Team	2001–02
AHCA East First-Team All-American	2001–02
ECAC Hockey All-Tournament Team	2002
All-ECAC Hockey First Team	2002–03
AHCA East First-Team All-American	2002–03
ECAC Hockey All-Tournament Team	2003

== Records ==
- San Jose Sharks record for hits in a game – 9 (tie) – set 2 April 2011

Awards and achievements
Preceded by Brian McMeekin	ECAC Hockey Best Defensive Defenseman; 2002–03	Succeeded by Scott Ford
