= Chris Dyment =

American professional ice hockey player

- Born: October 24, 1979 (age 46) Reading, Massachusetts, U.S.
- Height: 6 ft 3 in (191 cm)
- Weight: 207 lb (94 kg; 14 st 11 lb)
- Position: Defenceman
- Shot: Right
- Played for: Boston University; Houston Aeros; Springfield Falcons; Providence Bruins; Albany River Rats; Florida Everblades; SG Cortina; Trenton Devils
- NHL draft: 97th overall, 1999; Montreal Canadiens
- Playing career: 2002–2009

Chris Dyment (born October 24, 1979) is an American professional ice hockey player who last played for the Trenton Devils. He was drafted into the National Hockey League by the Montreal Canadiens in the 1999 NHL entry draft, 97th overall. He spent his junior career with Boston University.

== Career statistics ==
| | | | Regular season | | | | | Playoffs |
| Season | Team | League | GP | G | A | Pts | PIM | GP | G | A | Pts | PIM |
|---|---|---|---|---|---|---|---|---|---|---|---|---|
| 1998–99 | Boston University | NCAA | 25 | 1 | 5 | 6 | 18 | — | — | — | — | — |
| 1999–00 | Boston University | NCAA | 42 | 11 | 20 | 31 | 42 | — | — | — | — | — |
| 2000–01 | Boston University | NCAA | 37 | 1 | 10 | 11 | 38 | — | — | — | — | — |
| 2001–02 | Boston University | NCAA | 38 | 7 | 18 | 25 | 24 | — | — | — | — | — |
| 2002–03 | Houston Aeros | AHL | 40 | 2 | 3 | 5 | 64 | 17 | 0 | 1 | 1 | 8 |
| 2003–04 | Houston Aeros | AHL | 13 | 1 | 0 | 1 | 12 | — | — | — | — | — |
| 2003–04 | Springfield Falcons | AHL | 23 | 0 | 1 | 1 | 16 | — | — | — | — | — |
| 2004–05 | Providence Bruins | AHL | 48 | 3 | 4 | 7 | 112 | 5 | 0 | 0 | 0 | 0 |
| 2005–06 | Providence Bruins | AHL | 32 | 4 | 7 | 11 | 47 | 5 | 0 | 0 | 0 | 4 |
| 2006–07 | Albany River Rats | AHL | 7 | 0 | 0 | 0 | 4 | — | — | — | — | — |
| 2006–07 | Florida Everblades | ECHL | 56 | 7 | 10 | 17 | 62 | 2 | 1 | 1 | 2 | 2 |
| 2007–08 | SG Cortina | Italy | 29 | 2 | 3 | 5 | 52 | — | — | — | — | — |
| 2008–09 | Trenton Devils | ECHL | 47 | 0 | 12 | 12 | 61 | 7 | 0 | 1 | 1 | 15 |
| AHL totals | | | 163 | 10 | 15 | 25 | 255 | 27 | 0 | 1 | 1 | 12 |

== Awards and honors ==
| Award | Year |
|---|---|
| All-Hockey East First Team | 1999–00 |
| AHCA East Second-Team All-American | 1999–00 |
| All-Hockey East Second Team | 2001–02 |
| AHCA East Second-Team All-American | 2001–02 |

Awards and achievements
| Preceded by Bobby Allen | Hockey East Best Defensive Defenseman; 2001–02 | Succeeded by Cliff Loya |
