= David LeNeveu =

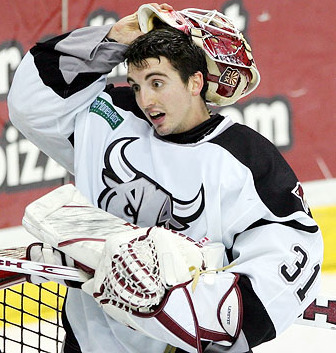
- LeNeveu with the San Antonio Rampage in 2006
- Born: May 23, 1983 (age 43) Fernie, British Columbia, Canada
- Height: 6 ft 1 in (185 cm)
- Weight: 187 lb (85 kg; 13 st 5 lb)
- Position: Goaltender
- Caught: Left
- Played for: Phoenix Coyotes; EC Red Bull Salzburg; Columbus Blue Jackets; EHC Black Wings Linz; HC Slovan Bratislava
- NHL draft: 46th overall, 2002; Phoenix Coyotes
- Playing career: 2003–2015

David LeNeveu (born May 23, 1983) is a Canadian former professional ice hockey goaltender. He has previously played in the National Hockey League (NHL) with the Phoenix Coyotes and the Columbus Blue Jackets. LeNeveu was rostered for the 2014 Stanley Cup Final by the New York Rangers, but never entered play.

== Playing career ==
=== College career ===
As a sophomore, LeNeveu led the Cornell Big Red to the 2003 Frozen Four. He set a Cornell record for shutouts that year with nine, topping legendary goalie Ken Dryden's record of six set in 1968. He was selected to the "Hobey Hat Trick", the three finalists for the Hobey Baker Award. Following that season he elected to leave school for professional hockey.

=== Professional career ===
LeNeveu was selected by the Phoenix Coyotes in the 2nd round (46th overall) of the 2002 NHL entry draft. He made his NHL debut on October 6, 2005, against the Los Angeles Kings, making 25 saves in a 3–2 defeat.

At the trading deadline of the 2007–08 season, the Coyotes traded LeNeveu, along with forwards Fredrik Sjostrom and Josh Gratton, to the New York Rangers in exchange for Marcel Hossa and goaltender Al Montoya. He was then signed to a one-year contract by the Ducks during the 2008 NHL free agency period

LeNeveu failed to play a game with the Ducks and served the year with affiliate, the Iowa Chops, for the 2008–09 season before leaving for Europe to signed initially on a try-out with EC Red Bull Salzburg on August 10, 2009. After completing a one-month trial period, David's tenure to the end of the season was confirmed by Red bull Salzburg on September 8, 2009.

After helping Salzburg capture the Austrian Championship, on July 7, 2010, LeNeveu signed a one-year, two-way deal to return to North America with the Columbus Blue Jackets.

On August 12, 2011, LeNeveu signed a contract with the Oklahoma City Barons. He recorded a career best 2.24 goals against average in 34 games during the 2011–12 season for the Barons.

A free agent into the following 2012–13 season, LeNeveu returned to Austria to sign a one-year deal to be inserted as the new starting goaltender for EHC Black Wings Linz on November 9, 2012.

LeNeveu returned to North America by signing with the South Carolina Stingrays of the ECHL. On December 27, 2013, LeNeveu was loaned to the Providence Bruins of the American Hockey League, he returned to the Stingrays on January 4, 2014. LeNeveu was loaned to Providence again on January 9, 2014.

On January 14, 2014, the Hartford Wolf Pack of the American Hockey League announced they had signed LeNeveu.

On January 21, 2014, the New York Rangers announced that LeNeveu had been signed to a two-way contract to serve as a backup goaltender when Henrik Lundqvist was ill and unable to play, forcing Cam Talbot to become the Rangers' starter. LeNeveu dressed for all Rangers games in the 2014 Stanley Cup Final because of an injury sustained by back-up goaltender Cam Talbot prior to game 1 of the Stanley Cup Final.

On December 11, 2014, he was announced as the new acquisition of HC Slovan Bratislava. His stay with Slovan was very short one, he left the team on January 7, 2015, with only single appearance vs. SKA St. Petersburg with total ice time 8:38 and 5 saves out of 7 shots.

== Career statistics ==
=== Regular season and playoffs ===
			Regular season									Playoffs
Season	Team	League	GP	W	L	T/OT	MIN	GA	SO	GAA	SV%	GP	W	L	MIN	GA	SO	GAA	SV%
1999–00	Fernie Ghostriders	AWHL	22	15	2	0	1140	48	0	2.49	—	—	—	—	—	—	—	—	—
2000–01	Nanaimo Clippers	BCHL	41	—	—	—	2330	127	6	3.29	—	—	—	—	—	—	—	—	—
2001–02	Cornell University	ECAC	14	11	2	1	842	21	2	1.50	.936	—	—	—	—	—	—	—	—
2002–03	Cornell University	ECAC	32	28	3	1	1946	39	9	1.20	.940	—	—	—	—	—	—	—	—
2003–04	Springfield Falcons	AHL	38	16	19	3	2217	102	1	2.76	.917	—	—	—	—	—	—	—	—
2004–05	Utah Grizzlies	AHL	48	11	32	3	2702	132	0	2.93	.909	—	—	—	—	—	—	—	—
2005–06	Phoenix Coyotes	NHL	15	3	8	2	814	44	0	3.24	.886	—	—	—	—	—	—	—	—
2005–06	San Antonio Rampage	AHL	28	10	16	2	1646	80	2	2.92	.921	—	—	—	—	—	—	—	—
2006–07	San Antonio Rampage	AHL	37	13	20	2	2102	104	2	2.97	.907	—	—	—	—	—	—	—	—
2006–07	Phoenix Coyotes	NHL	6	2	1	0	233	15	0	3.86	.894	—	—	—	—	—	—	—	—
2007–08	San Antonio Rampage	AHL	21	9	7	3	1172	52	1	2.66	.911	—	—	—	—	—	—	—	—
2007–08	Hartford Wolf Pack	AHL	13	8	3	2	786	24	1	1.83	.924	4	1	3	266	11	0	2.48	.910
2008–09	Iowa Chops	AHL	46	20	19	6	2627	129	0	2.95	.895	—	—	—	—	—	—	—	—
2009–10	EC Red Bull Salzburg	EBEL	43	—	—	—	2467	106	2	2.58	—	9	6	2	—	—	—	2.17	.912
2010–11	Springfield Falcons	AHL	42	16	21	2	2426	120	0	2.97	.896	—	—	—	—	—	—	—	—
2010–11	Columbus Blue Jackets	NHL	1	0	0	0	20	2	0	6.00	.833	—	—	—	—	—	—	—	—
2011–12	Oklahoma City Barons	AHL	34	18	12	3	1927	72	2	2.24	.918	1	0	0	20	0	0	0.00	1.000
2012–13	EHC Black Wings Linz	EBEL	27	—	—	—	—	—	—	2.60	.917	13	—	—	—	—	—	2.56	.930
2013–14	South Carolina Stingrays	ECHL	8	4	4	0	476	13	3	1.64	.940	—	—	—	—	—	—	—	—
2013–14	Providence Bruins	AHL	1	0	1	0	59	1	0	1.01	.952	—	—	—	—	—	—	—	—
2013–14	Hartford Wolf Pack	AHL	22	12	8	0	1171	48	3	2.46	.915	—	—	—	—	—	—	—	—
2014–15	South Carolina Stingrays	ECHL	3	0	2	1	184	13	0	4.24	.822	—	—	—	—	—	—	—	—
2014–15	HC Slovan Bratislava	KHL	1	0	1	0	8	2	0	13.87	.714	—	—	—	—	—	—	—	—
NHL totals			22	5	9	2	1067	61	0	3.43	.887	—	—	—	—	—	—	—	—

Medal record

Men's ice hockey

Representing Canada

World Junior Hockey Championships
Silver medal – second place	2003 Canada	

== Awards and honors ==
Award	Year
All-ECAC Hockey Rookie Team	2001–02
ECAC Hockey Champion	2001–02
All-ECAC Hockey First Team	2002–03
ECAC Hockey Player of the Year	2002–03
AHCA East First-Team All-American	2002–03
Austrian Champion	2009–10
IIHF Continental Cup Champion	2010

== Post-Hockey career ==
David now lives in Nanaimo, BC with his family and is a Chartered Investment Manager and Co-Founder of Rockmoor Wealth Management.

Awards and achievements
Preceded by Marc Cavosie	ECAC Hockey Player of the Year; 2002–03 shared with Chris Higgins	Succeeded by Yann Danis
Preceded by Matt Underhill	Ken Dryden Award; 2002–03	Succeeded by Yann Danis
Preceded by Tyler Kolarik	ECAC Hockey Most Outstanding Player in Tournament; 2003	Succeeded by Brendan Bernakevitch
