= Marc Cavosie =

American ice hockey player (born 1981)

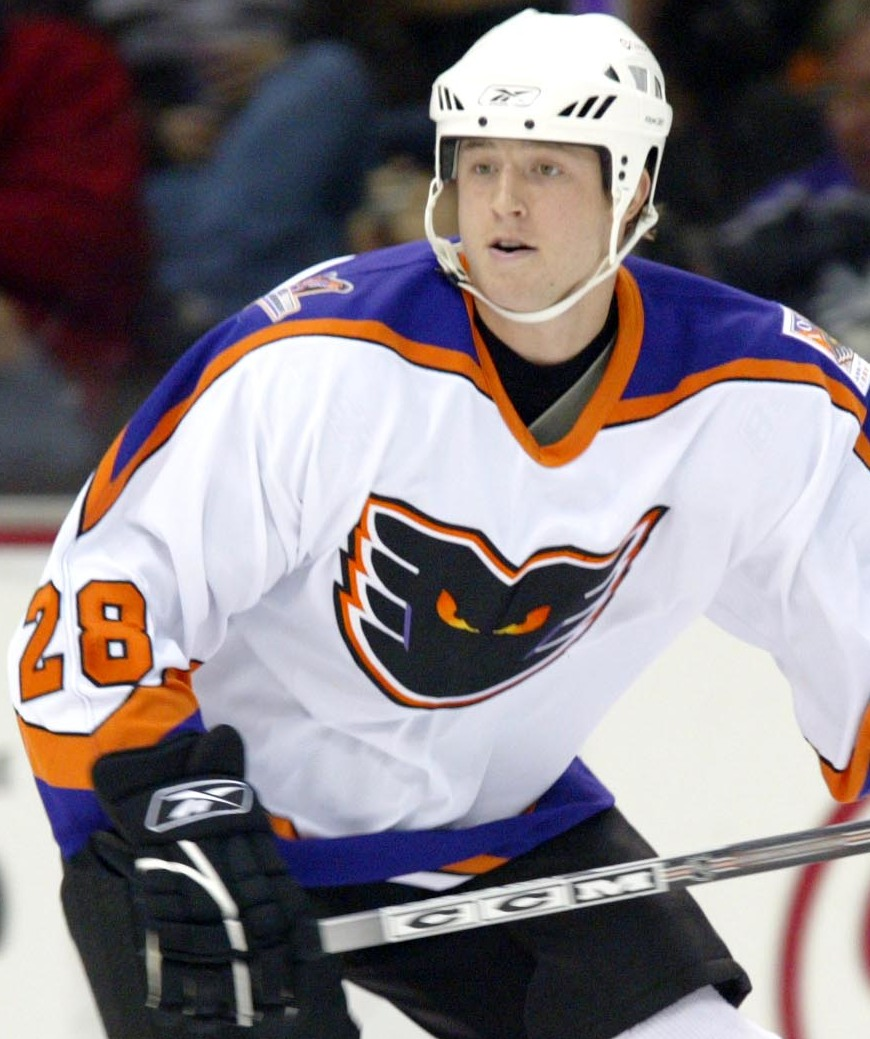
- Cavosie with the Philadelphia Phantoms in 2005
- Born: August 6, 1981 (age 44) Albany, New York, U.S.
- Height: 6 ft 0 in (183 cm)
- Weight: 196 lb (89 kg; 14 st 0 lb)
- Position: Wing
- Shot: Left
- Played for: Houston Aeros; Philadelphia Phantoms; Rögle BK; Albany River Rats; Binghamton Senators; Lake Erie Monsters; HK Jesenice; Oji Eagles; Tohoku Free Blades
- NHL draft: 99th overall, 2000; Minnesota Wild
- Playing career: 2002–2014

Marc Cavosie (born August 6, 1981) is an American former professional ice hockey player who last played for the Tohoku Free Blades of the Asia League Ice Hockey. He was selected by the Minnesota Wild in the 4th round (99th overall) of the 2000 NHL entry draft.

== Playing career ==
Prior to turning professional, Cavosie attended the Rensselaer Polytechnic Institute where he played three seasons with the RPI Engineers men's ice hockey team which competes in NCAA's Division I in the ECAC conference.

After two seasons with the Oji Eagles in the Asia League Ice Hockey, Cavosie returned to Europe and signed a one-year deal with SC Bietigheim-Bissingen of the German DEL2 on August 2, 2013. Due to a foot injury, Cavosie was never registered to play with the Steelers and ultimately returned to the Asian League with the Tohoku Free Blades.

== Career statistics ==
=== Regular season and playoffs ===
			Regular season					Playoffs
Season	Team	League	GP	G	A	Pts	PIM	GP	G	A	Pts	PIM
1998–99	The Albany Academy	HS-Prep
1999–2000	RPI Engineers	ECAC	33	12	18	30	26	—	—	—	—	—
2000–01	RPI Engineers	ECAC	28	13	16	29	47	—	—	—	—	—
2001–02	RPI Engineers	ECAC	36	23	27	50	44	—	—	—	—	—
2002–03	Houston Aeros	AHL	54	5	14	19	24	19	3	5	8	12
2003–04	Houston Aeros	AHL	75	10	21	31	37	2	1	0	1	0
2004–05	Houston Aeros	AHL	60	3	17	20	10	4	0	0	0	2
2005–06	Philadelphia Phantoms	AHL	63	8	21	29	28	—	—	—	—	—
2006–07	Rögle BK	SWE.3	27	0	6	6	18	—	—	—	—	—
2007–08	Columbia Inferno	ECHL	17	2	4	6	10	—	—	—	—	—
2007–08	Reading Royals	ECHL	24	10	13	23	10	—	—	—	—	—
2007–08	Albany River Rats	AHL	16	4	8	12	11	7	1	3	4	5
2008–09	Albany River Rats	AHL	11	0	4	4	10	—	—	—	—	—
2008–09	Binghamton Senators	AHL	64	10	13	23	18	—	—	—	—	—
2009–10	Lake Erie Monsters	AHL	16	0	2	2	6	—	—	—	—	—
2009–10	Reading Royals	ECHL	38	9	26	35	21	16	7	9	16	8
2009–10	Albany River Rats	AHL	2	0	1	1	0	—	—	—	—	—
2010–11	HK Jesenice	EBEL	41	5	19	24	18	—	—	—	—	—
2010–11	HK Jesenice	SVN	4	3	5	8	2	4	4	3	7	4
2011–12	Oji Eagles	ALH	28	11	20	31	16	7	4	8	12	2
2012–13	Oji Eagles	ALH	39	15	51	66	12	7	3	2	5	0
2013–14	Tohoku Free Blades	ALH	28	17	28	45	10	—	—	—	—	—
AHL totals			361	40	101	141	144	32	5	8	13	19

=== International ===
Year	Team	Event	Result	GP	G	A	Pts	PIM
2001	United States	WJC	5th	7	2	4	6	4
Junior totals				7	2	4	6	4

== Awards and honors ==
Award	Year
College
All-ECAC Hockey Rookie Team	1999–00
All-ECAC Hockey First Team	2001–02
ECAC Player of the Year	2001–02
AHCA East First-Team All-American	2001–02

Awards and achievements
Preceded by Erik Anderson	ECAC Hockey Player of the Year; 2001–02	Succeeded by Chris Higgins; David LeNeveu
