= 2001–02 NCAA Division I men's ice hockey rankings =

- NCAA tournament: 2002
- NCAA champion: Minnesota
- Preseason No. 1 (USA Today): Michigan State
- Preseason No. 1 (USCHO): Michigan State
- NCAA Division I men's ice hockey rankings

Two human polls made up the 2001–02 NCAA Division I men's ice hockey rankings, the USCHO.com Division I Men's Poll and the USA TODAY/American Hockey Magazine Poll. As the 2001–02 season progressed, rankings were updated weekly. There were a total of 19 voters in the USA Today poll and 40 voters in the USCHO.com poll. Each first place vote in either poll is worth 15 points in the rankings with every subsequent vote worth 1 fewer point.

== Legend ==
	Increase in ranking
	Decrease in ranking
	Not ranked previous week
(Italics)	Number of first place votes
#–#–#	Win–loss–tie record
†	Tied with team above or below also with this symbol

== USA TODAY/American Hockey Magazine Poll ==
	Preseason Oct 1	Week 1 Oct 8	Week 2 Oct 15	Week 3 Oct 22	Week 4 Oct 29	Week 5 Nov 5	Week 6 Nov 12	Week 7 Nov 19	Week 8 Nov 26	Week 9 Dec 3	Week 10 Dec 10	Week 11 Dec 17	Week 12 Dec 31	Week 13 Jan 7	Week 14 Jan 14	Week 15 Jan 21	Week 16 Jan 28	Week 17 Feb 4	Week 18 Feb 11	Week 19 Feb 18	Week 20 Feb 25	Week 21 Mar 4	Week 22 Mar 11	Week 23 Mar 18	Week 24 Mar 25	Final Apr 7	
1	Michigan State (6)	Michigan State (10) 0–0–1	Michigan State (16) 2–0–1	Michigan State (15) 3–0–1	Minnesota (18) 5–0–0	St. Cloud State; 8–0–0	Minnesota (13) 8–0–1	Minnesota (17) 10–0–1	Minnesota (19) 11–0–2	St. Cloud State (17) 12–1–1	St. Cloud State (16) 13–2–1	St. Cloud State (16) 15–2–1	St. Cloud State; 17–2–1	St. Cloud State (15) 18–2–1	Denver (16) 20–2–0	Denver; 22–2–0	New Hampshire (10) 19–4–2	New Hampshire (7) 19–5–3	New Hampshire † (7) 20–5–3	Denver (10) 26–5–1	Denver (14) 27–6–1	New Hampshire (9) 25–6–3	New Hampshire (14) 27–6–3	New Hampshire (19) 29–6–3	New Hampshire (19) 30–6–3	Minnesota; 32–8–4	1
2	North Dakota (7)	Minnesota (7) 1–0–0	Minnesota (3) 1–0–0	Minnesota (4) 3–0–0	St. Cloud State (1) 6–0–0	Minnesota; 6–0–1	Denver (5) 8–0–0	Denver (2) 8–0–0	St. Cloud State; 11–1–0	Minnesota †; 11–1–3	Minnesota (1) 12–2–3	Minnesota (1) 12–2–3	Denver; 16–2–0	Denver (3) 18–2–0	St. Cloud State (3) 19–3–1	New Hampshire; 17–4–2	Denver (9) 23–3–0	St. Cloud State (4) 22–5–2	St. Cloud State † (7) 24–5–2	St. Cloud State (8) 26–5–2	St. Cloud State (1) 27–6–2	Denver (6) 28–7–1	Denver (2) 30–7–1	Denver; 32–7–1	Minnesota; 30–8–4	Maine; 26–11–7	2
3	Minnesota (2)	Michigan; 0–0–1	North Dakota; 2–1–0	St. Cloud State; 4–0–0	Denver; 4–0–0	Denver; 6–0–0	St. Cloud State (1) 9–1–0	St. Cloud State; 11–1–0	Michigan State; 9–2–2	Denver † (2) 11–1–0	Denver (1) 12–2–0	Denver (1) 14–2–0	Minnesota; 14–2–3	New Hampshire (1) 15–3–2	Massachusetts-Lowell; 16–3–1	St. Cloud State; 20–4–1	Minnesota †; 18–5–4	Denver † (3) 23–5–0	Denver (4) 24–5–1	New Hampshire; 21–6–3	New Hampshire (2) 22–6–3	Minnesota (4) 26–7–4	Minnesota (3) 28–7–4	Minnesota; 29–8–4	Maine; 25–10–7	New Hampshire; 30–7–3	3
4	Michigan	Colorado College; 0–0–0	St. Cloud State; 2–0–0	North Dakota; 3–2–0	Michigan State; 3–2–1	Michigan State; 5–2–1	Boston University; 5–0–1	Michigan State; 8–2–1	Denver; 9–1–0	New Hampshire; 9–2–2	Michigan State; 12–3–2	Michigan State; 12–3–2	New Hampshire; 13–3–2	Minnesota; 15–3–3	New Hampshire; 15–4–2	Minnesota; 17–4–4	Michigan State †; 19–5–3	Michigan State † (3) 19–5–5	Minnesota; 21–6–4	Michigan State; 21–6–5	Michigan State; 23–6–5	St. Cloud State; 27–8–2	Michigan State; 26–7–5	Boston University; 25–9–3	Michigan; 28–10–5	Michigan; 28–11–5	4
5	Providence	North Dakota; 0–1–0	Michigan; 1–1–1	Denver; 2–0–0	Nebraska-Omaha; 5–1–0	Boston University; 4–0–1	Michigan State; 6–2–1	Boston University; 5–1–1	New Hampshire; 7–2–2	Massachusetts-Lowell; 10–2–0	Massachusetts-Lowell (1) 12–2–0	Massachusetts-Lowell (1) 12–2–0	Massachusetts-Lowell; 13–3–0	Massachusetts-Lowell; 14–3–1	Minnesota; 16–4–3	Michigan State; 17–5–3	St. Cloud State; 20–5–2	Minnesota (1) 19–6–4	Michigan State; 20–6–5	Boston University (1) 21–7–2	Boston University (2) 23–7–2	Michigan State; 24–7–5	St. Cloud State; 29–8–2	Maine; 23–10–7	Denver; 32–8–1	Denver; 32–8–1	5
6	Colorado College	Providence; 0–0–0	New Hampshire; 1–0–0	Colorado College; 2–2–0	Boston University; 3–0–0	Nebraska-Omaha; 6–2–0	Northern Michigan; 6–1–1	New Hampshire; 5–2–2	Boston University; 7–2–1	Michigan State; 10–3–2	New Hampshire; 10–3–2	New Hampshire; 11–3–2	Michigan State; 13–4–2	Michigan State; 15–4–2	Michigan State; 16–5–2	Boston University; 14–5–2	Northern Michigan; 17–7–2	Colorado College; 18–8–2	Colorado College; 19–8–3	Minnesota; 22–7–4	Minnesota; 24–7–4	Michigan; 22–9–5	Boston University; 25–8–3	Michigan State; 27–8–5	Boston University; 25–10–3	Boston University; 25–10–3	6
7	Boston College (4)	Boston College (2) 1–0–0	Denver; 2–0–0	Michigan †; 2–2–1	North Dakota; 4–3–0	New Hampshire; 3–1–2	Nebraska-Omaha; 7–3–0	Massachusetts-Lowell; 7–2–0	Massachusetts-Lowell; 8–2–0	Boston University; 8–3–1	Boston University; 10–3–1	Boston University; 10–3–1	Boston University; 11–4–1	Boston University; 12–5–1	Boston University; 12–5–2	Massachusetts-Lowell; 16–5–1	Colorado College; 16–8–2	Maine; 16–7–5	Cornell (1) 17–5–1	Colorado College; 20–9–3	Michigan; 20–9–5	Boston University; 23–8–3	Maine; 22–9–7	Michigan; 26–10–5	Michigan State; 27–9–5	Colorado College; 27–13–3	7
8	Harvard	Maine; 0–0–0	Maine; 1–1–0	Maine †; 2–2–0	Colorado College; 2–2–0	Massachusetts-Lowell; 4–1–0	New Hampshire; 4–2–2	Nebraska-Omaha; 7–4–1	Northern Michigan; 8–3–1	Northern Michigan; 8–3–1	Cornell; 8–2–1	Cornell; 8–2–1	Michigan; 11–6–3	Northern Michigan; 12–6–2	Michigan; 13–7–4	Colorado College; 14–8–2	Maine; 15–7–4	Cornell (1) 15–5–1	Boston University; 18–7–2	Cornell; 18–6–1	Cornell; 19–6–2	Cornell; 21–6–2	Cornell; 23–6–2	St. Cloud State; 29–10–2	Colorado College; 27–13–3	Michigan State; 27–9–5	8
9	St. Cloud State	New Hampshire; 0–0–0	Colorado College; 0–2–0	New Hampshire; 2–1–0	Massachusetts-Lowell; 4–0–0	Northern Michigan; 4–1–1	Cornell; 4–0–0	Michigan; 5–4–2	Cornell; 6–2–0	Cornell; 7–2–1	Michigan; 10–5–2	Michigan; 10–5–3	Northern Michigan; 11–6–1	Michigan; 12–6–4	Colorado College; 12–8–2	Michigan; 13–7–5	Massachusetts-Lowell; 16–7–1	Boston University; 16–7–2	Michigan; 18–8–5	Michigan; 18–9–5	Maine; 19–9–6	Maine; 20–9–7	Colorado College; 24–11–3	Cornell; 24–7–2	Cornell; 25–8–2	Cornell; 25–8–2	9
10	Maine	Harvard; 0–0–0	Harvard; 0–0–0	Boston University; 2–0–0	New Hampshire; 2–1–1	North Dakota; 4–5–0	Massachusetts-Lowell; 5–2–0	Northern Michigan; 6–3–1	North Dakota; 5–5–1	Colorado College; 8–5–1	Colorado College; 9–6–1	Colorado College; 9–6–1	Boston College; 10–6–2	Boston College; 11–6–2	Northern Michigan; 13–7–2	Northern Michigan; 15–7–2	Cornell; 13–5–1	Northern Michigan; 18–8–2	Maine; 16–9–5	Maine; 17–9–6	Colorado College; 20–11–3	Colorado College; 22–11–3	Michigan; 24–10–5	Colorado College; 26–12–3	St. Cloud State; 29–11–2	St. Cloud State; 29–11–2	10
11	New Hampshire	St. Cloud State; 0–0–0	Boston University; 1–0–0	Harvard; 0–0–0	Harvard; 0–0–0	Maine; 3–3–1	North Dakota; 4–5–0	Cornell; 5–1–0	Colorado College; 7–5–0	Michigan; 8–5–2	Northern Michigan; 8–5–1	Maine; 8–5–3	Maine; 9–6–3	Maine; 11–6–3	Ohio State; 13–7–2	Cornell; 11–5–1	Boston University; 14–7–2	Michigan; 16–8–5	Alaska; 18–10–2	Alaska; 18–10–2	Alaska; 19–10–3	Northern Michigan; 23–11–2	Alaska; 22–11–3	Northern Michigan; 26–12–2	Northern Michigan; 26–12–2	Northern Michigan; 26–12–2	11
12	Nebraska-Omaha	Nebraska-Omaha; 0–0–0	Nebraska-Omaha; 1–1–0	Nebraska-Omaha; 3–1–0	Northern Michigan; 3–0–1	Colorado College; 2–4–0	Michigan; 4–4–1	North Dakota; 5–5–1	Ohio State; 8–3–1	Nebraska-Omaha; 9–5–2	Ohio State; 9–4–1	Northern Michigan; 9–6–1	Cornell; 8–4–1	Colorado College; 11–7–2	Maine; 11–7–4	Maine; 13–7–4	Michigan; 14–8–5	Nebraska-Omaha; 18–9–3	Massachusetts-Lowell; 17–8–3	Northern Michigan; 20–10–2	Northern Michigan; 21–11–2	Alaska; 20–11–3	Northern Michigan; 25–11–2	Alaska; 22–12–3	Alaska; 22–12–3	Alaska; 22–12–3	12
13	Clarkson	Clarkson; 0–0–0	Boston College; 1–1–1	Massachusetts-Lowell; 3–0–0	Michigan; 2–4–1	Michigan; 4–4–1	Miami; 6–3–1	Colorado College; 5–5–0	Michigan; 6–5–2	Ohio State; 9–4–1	Maine; 8–5–3	Boston College; 8–6–2	Colorado College; 9–7–2	Cornell; 8–4–1	Alaska; 13–8–1	Alaska; 14–8–2	Nebraska-Omaha; 16–9–3	Massachusetts-Lowell; 17–8–1	Northeastern; 16–9–3	Northeastern; 17–10–3	Western Michigan; 19–11–4	Massachusetts-Lowell; 20–11–3	Massachusetts-Lowell; 22–12–3	Massachusetts-Lowell; 22–13–3	Harvard; 15–15–4	Harvard; 15–15–4	13
14	Wisconsin	Dartmouth; 0–0–0	Minnesota-Duluth; 2–0–0	Providence; 1–2–0	Maine; 2–3–1	Miami; 5–2–1	Colorado College; 3–5–0	Ohio State; 7–2–1	Nebraska-Omaha; 8–5–1	Boston College; 8–5–1	Boston College; 8–6–2	Harvard; 5–4–2	Alaska; 11–7–0	Alaska; 12–7–1	Boston College; 11–8–2	Ohio State; 14–8–2	Alaska †; 14–10–2	Alaska; 16–10–2	Northern Michigan; 18–10–2	Nebraska-Omaha; 19–12–3	Massachusetts-Lowell; 18–11–3	Western Michigan; 19–13–4	Ohio State; 19–15–4	Ohio State; 20–16–4	Massachusetts-Lowell; 22–13–3	Massachusetts-Lowell; 22–13–3	14
15	Dartmouth †	Ohio State; 0–0–0	Providence; 0–2–0	Dartmouth; 0–0–0	Dartmouth; 0–0–0	Cornell; 2–0–0	Clarkson; 4–2–1	Maine; 5–4–2	Boston College; 7–4–1	Maine; 7–5–2	Nebraska-Omaha; 9–7–2	Alaska; 11–7–0	North Dakota; 9–9–1	Ohio State; 12–7–1	Cornell; 9–5–1	Nebraska-Omaha; 14–9–3	Harvard †; 9–6–3	Northeastern; 14–9–3	Western Michigan; 16–10–4	Massachusetts-Lowell; 17–10–3	Nebraska-Omaha; 19–13–4	Northeastern; 18–13–3	Rensselaer; 18–12–4	Harvard; 15–14–4	Ohio State; 20–16–4	Ohio State; 20–16–4	15
16	Denver †																										16
	Preseason Oct 1	Week 1 Oct 8	Week 2 Oct 15	Week 3 Oct 22	Week 4 Oct 29	Week 5 Nov 5	Week 6 Nov 12	Week 7 Nov 19	Week 8 Nov 26	Week 9 Dec 3	Week 10 Dec 10	Week 11 Dec 17	Week 12 Dec 31	Week 13 Jan 7	Week 14 Jan 14	Week 15 Jan 21	Week 16 Jan 28	Week 17 Feb 4	Week 18 Feb 11	Week 19 Feb 18	Week 20 Feb 25	Week 21 Mar 4	Week 22 Mar 11	Week 23 Mar 18	Week 24 Mar 25	Final Apr 7	
		Dropped: Wisconsin; 0–0–0; Denver; 0–0–0	Dropped: Clarkson; 0–1–1; Dartmouth; 0–0–0; Ohio State; 0–0–0	Dropped: Boston College; 1–3–1; Minnesota-Duluth; 2–2–0	Dropped: Providence; 1–4–0	Dropped: Harvard; 1–1–0; Dartmouth; 1–1–0	Dropped: Maine; 3–4–2	Dropped: Miami; 6–5–1; Clarkson; 4–4–1	Dropped: Maine; 5–4–2	Dropped: North Dakota; 5–7–1	Dropped: None	Dropped: Ohio State; 9–6–1; Nebraska-Omaha; 9–7–2	Dropped: Harvard; 6–5–3	Dropped: North Dakota; 10–10–1	Dropped: None	Dropped: Boston College; 11–10–2	Dropped: Ohio State; 14–10–2	Dropped: Harvard; 9–8–3	Dropped: Nebraska-Omaha; 18–11–3	Dropped: Western Michigan; 17–11–4	Dropped: Northeastern; 17–12–3	Dropped: Nebraska-Omaha; 20–14–4	Dropped: Western Michigan; 19–15–4; Northeastern; 19–15–3	Dropped: Rensselaer; 20–13–4	Dropped: None	Dropped: None	

== USCHO.com Division I Men's Poll ==
	Preseason Oct 5	Week 1 Oct 15	Week 2 Oct 22	Week 3 Oct 29	Week 4 Nov 5	Week 5 Nov 12	Week 6 Nov 19	Week 7 Nov 26	Week 8 Dec 3	Week 9 Dec 10	Week 10 Dec 17	Week 11 Dec 31	Week 12 Jan 7	Week 13 Jan 14	Week 14 Jan 21	Week 15 Jan 28	Week 16 Feb 4	Week 17 Feb 11	Week 18 Feb 18	Week 19 Feb 25	Week 20 Mar 4	Week 21 Mar 11	Week 22 Mar 18	
1	Michigan State (33)	Michigan State (31) 2–0–1	Michigan State (32) 3–0–1	Minnesota (31) 5–0–0	St. Cloud State (36) 8–0–0	Minnesota (24) 8–0–1	Minnesota (30) 10–0–1	Minnesota (37) 11–0–2	St. Cloud State (37) 12–1–1	St. Cloud State (39) 13–2–1	St. Cloud State (38) 15–2–1	St. Cloud State (36) 17–2–1	St. Cloud State (33) 18–2–1	Denver (37) 20–2–0	Denver (40) 22–2–0	Denver (24) 23–3–0	Denver (11) 23–5–0	Denver (21) 24–5–1	Denver (35) 26–5–1	Denver (26) 27–6–1	New Hampshire (22) 25–6–3	New Hampshire (27) 27–6–3	New Hampshire (34) 29–6–3	1
2	North Dakota (4)	North Dakota (1) 2–1–0	Minnesota (7) 3–0–0	St. Cloud State (8) 6–0–0	Minnesota (4) 6–0–1	Denver (13) 8–0–0	Denver (7) 8–0–0	St. Cloud State (3) 11–1–0	Minnesota (2) 11–1–3	Minnesota (1) 12–2–3	Minnesota (1) 12–2–3	Denver (4) 16–2–0	Denver (7) 18–2–0	St. Cloud State (2) 19–3–1	New Hampshire; 17–4–2	New Hampshire (16) 19–4–2	St. Cloud State (12) 22–5–2	St. Cloud State (13) 24–5–2	St. Cloud State (5) 26–5–2	St. Cloud State (3) 27–6–2	Denver (14) 28–7–1	Denver (10) 30–7–1	Denver (6) 32–7–1	2
3	Colorado College	Minnesota (6) 1–0–0	St. Cloud State (1) 4–0–0	Michigan State (1) 3–2–1	Denver; 6–0–0	St. Cloud State (3) 9–1–0	St. Cloud State (3) 11–1–0	Michigan State; 9–2–2	Denver (1) 11–1–0	Denver; 12–2–0	Denver (1) 14–2–0	Minnesota; 14–2–3	New Hampshire; 15–3–2	Massachusetts-Lowell (1) 16–3–1	St. Cloud State; 20–4–1	Minnesota; 18–5–4	New Hampshire (9) 19–5–3	New Hampshire (5) 20–5–3	New Hampshire; 21–6–3	New Hampshire (10) 22–6–3	Minnesota (3) 26–7–4	Minnesota (3) 28–7–4	Minnesota; 29–8–4	3
4	Minnesota (3)	St. Cloud State (1) 2–0–0	North Dakota; 3–2–0	Denver; 4–0–0	Michigan State; 5–2–1	Michigan State; 6–2–1	Michigan State; 8–2–1	Denver; 9–1–0	New Hampshire; 9–2–2	Michigan State; 12–3–2	Michigan State; 12–3–2	New Hampshire; 13–3–2	Minnesota; 15–3–3	New Hampshire; 15–4–2	Minnesota; 17–4–4	Michigan State; 19–5–3	Michigan State (3) 19–5–5	Minnesota; 21–6–4	Minnesota; 22–7–4	Minnesota; 24–7–4	St. Cloud State; 27–8–2	St. Cloud State; 29–8–2	Michigan State; 27–8–5	4
5	Michigan	Michigan (1) 1–1–1	Colorado College; 2–2–0	North Dakota; 4–3–0	Boston University; 4–0–1	Boston University; 5–0–1	Boston University; 6–1–1	New Hampshire; 7–2–2	Michigan State; 10–3–2	Massachusetts-Lowell; 12–2–0	Massachusetts-Lowell; 12–2–0	Massachusetts-Lowell; 13–3–0	Massachusetts-Lowell; 14–3–0	Minnesota; 16–4–3	Michigan State; 17–5–3	St. Cloud State; 20–5–2	Minnesota (3) 19–6–4	Michigan State; 20–6–5	Michigan State; 21–6–5	Michigan State (1) 23–6–5	Michigan State; 24–7–5	Michigan State; 26–7–5	Boston University; 25–9–3	5
6	Providence	New Hampshire; 1–0–0	Michigan; 2–2–1	Nebraska-Omaha; 5–1–0	Nebraska-Omaha; 6–2–0	Northern Michigan; 6–1–1	New Hampshire; 5–2–2	Boston University; 8–2–1	Massachusetts-Lowell; 10–2–0	New Hampshire; 10–3–2	New Hampshire; 11–3–2	Michigan State; 13–4–2	Michigan State; 15–4–2	Michigan State; 16–5–2	Boston University; 14–5–2	Maine; 15–7–4	Colorado College (1) 18–8–2	Colorado College; 19–8–3	Boston University; 21–7–2	Boston University; 23–7–2	Michigan; 22–9–5	Boston University; 25–8–3	Maine; 23–10–7	6
7	Maine	Colorado College; 0–2–0	Maine; 2–2–0	Colorado College; 2–2–0	New Hampshire; 3–1–2	Nebraska-Omaha; 7–3–0	Massachusetts-Lowell; 7–2–0	Massachusetts-Lowell; 8–2–0	Boston University; 8–3–1	Boston University; 10–3–1	Boston University; 10–3–1	Boston University; 11–4–1	Boston University; 12–5–1	Boston University; 12–5–2	Massachusetts-Lowell; 16–5–1	Northern Michigan; 17–7–2	Maine (1) 16–7–5	Cornell (1) 17–5–1	Colorado College; 20–9–3	Maine; 19–9–6	Maine; 20–9–7	Maine; 22–9–7	Michigan; 26–10–5	7
8	St. Cloud State	Denver; 2–0–0	Denver; 2–0–0	Boston University; 3–0–0	North Dakota; 4–5–0	New Hampshire; 4–2–2	Nebraska-Omaha; 7–4–1	Northern Michigan; 8–3–1	Northern Michigan; 8–3–1	Cornell; 8–2–1	Cornell; 8–2–1	Michigan; 11–6–3	Michigan; 12–6–4	Michigan; 13–7–4	Michigan; 13–7–5	Colorado College; 16–8–2	Cornell; 15–5–1	Boston University; 18–7–2	Cornell; 18–6–1	Michigan; 20–9–5	Boston University; 23–8–3	Cornell; 23–6–2	St. Cloud State; 29–10–2	8
9	Harvard	Maine; 1–1–0	Boston University; 2–0–0	Massachusetts-Lowell; 4–0–0	Northern Michigan; 4–1–1	North Dakota; 4–5–0	North Dakota; 5–5–1	North Dakota; 5–5–1	Cornell; 7–2–1	Michigan; 10–5–2	Michigan; 10–5–3	Northern Michigan; 11–6–1	Northern Michigan; 12–6–2	Northern Michigan; 13–7–2	Colorado College; 14–8–2	Massachusetts-Lowell; 16–7–1	Boston University; 16–7–2	Michigan; 18–8–5	Maine; 17–9–6	Cornell; 19–6–2	Cornell; 21–6–2	Michigan; 24–10–5	Cornell; 24–7–2	9
10	New Hampshire	Minnesota-Duluth; 2–0–0	New Hampshire; 2–1–0	Northern Michigan; 3–0–1	Maine; 3–3–1	Massachusetts-Lowell; 5–2–0	Northern Michigan; 6–3–1	Cornell; 6–2–0	Nebraska-Omaha; 9–5–2	Colorado College; 9–6–1	Colorado College; 9–6–1	Boston College; 10–6–2	Boston College; 11–6–2	Colorado College; 12–8–2	Northern Michigan; 15–7–2	Boston University; 14–7–2	Northern Michigan; 18–8–2	Maine; 16–9–5	Michigan; 18–9–5	Colorado College; 20–11–3	Colorado College; 22–11–3	Colorado College; 24–11–3	Colorado College; 26–12–3	10
11	Boston College	Harvard; 0–0–0	Harvard; 0–0–0	Harvard; 0–0–0	Massachusetts-Lowell; 4–1–0	Cornell; 4–0–0	Michigan; 5–4–2	Nebraska-Omaha; 8–5–1	Michigan; 8–5–2	Northern Michigan; 8–5–1	Maine; 8–5–3	Maine; 9–6–3	Maine; 11–6–3	Maine; 11–7–4	Maine; 13–7–4	Cornell; 13–5–1	Michigan; 16–8–5	Alaska; 18–10–2	Alaska; 18–10–2	Alaska; 19–10–3	Northern Michigan; 23–11–2	Northern Michigan; 25–11–2	Northern Michigan; 26–12–2	11
12	Clarkson	Providence; 0–2–0	Nebraska-Omaha; 3–1–0	New Hampshire; 2–1–1	Michigan; 4–4–1	Michigan; 4–4–1	Cornell; 5–1–0	Colorado College; 7–5–0	Colorado College; 8–5–1	Ohio State; 9–4–1	Northern Michigan; 9–6–1	Cornell; 8–4–1	Colorado College; 11–7–2	Ohio State; 13–7–2	Cornell; 11–5–1	Michigan; 14–8–5	Massachusetts-Lowell; 17–8–1	Massachusetts-Lowell; 17–8–3	Northern Michigan; 20–10–2	Northern Michigan; 21–11–2	Alaska; 20–11–3	Alaska; 22–11–3	Alaska; 22–12–3	12
13	Nebraska-Omaha	Boston University; 1–0–0	Massachusetts-Lowell; 3–0–0	Maine; 2–3–1	Colorado College; 2–4–0	Colorado College; 3–5–0	Colorado College; 5–5–0	Michigan; 6–5–2	Ohio State; 9–4–1	Maine; 8–5–3	Boston College; 8–6–2	Colorado College; 9–7–2	Cornell; 8–4–1	Boston College; 12–8–2	Alaska; 14–8–2	Nebraska-Omaha; 16–9–3	Nebraska-Omaha; 18–9–3	Northern Michigan; 18–10–2	Northeastern; 17–12–3	Western Michigan; 19–11–4	Massachusetts-Lowell; 20–11–3	Massachusetts-Lowell; 22–12–3	Massachusetts-Lowell; 22–13–3	13
14	Dartmouth	Boston College; 1–1–1	Providence; 1–2–0	Michigan; 2–4–1	Harvard; 1–1–0	Maine; 3–4–2	Ohio State; 7–2–1	Ohio State; 8–3–1	Boston College; 8–5–1	Boston College; 8–6–2	Nebraska-Omaha; 9–7–2	Nebraska-Omaha; 10–8–2	Ohio State; 12–7–2	Cornell; 9–5–1	Ohio State; 14–8–2	Harvard; 9–6–3	Alaska; 16–10–2	Northeastern; 16–10–3	Massachusetts-Lowell; 17–10–3	Massachusetts-Lowell; 18–11–3	Western Michigan; 19–13–4	Rensselaer; 18–12–4	Ohio State; 20–16–4	14
15	Boston University	Nebraska-Omaha; 1–1–0	Rensselaer; 1–1–0	Dartmouth; 0–0–0	Miami; 5–2–1	Clarkson; 4–2–1	Maine; 5–4–2	Maine; 6–4–2	Maine; 7–5–2	Nebraska-Omaha; 9–7–2	Ohio State; 9–6–1	Alaska; 11–7–0	Alaska; 12–7–1	Alaska; 13–8–1	Nebraska-Omaha; 14–9–3	Alaska; 14–10–2	Ohio State; 14–10–4	Western Michigan; 16–10–4	Western Michigan; 17–11–4	Northeastern; 17–14–3	Northeastern; 18–15–3	Ohio State; 19–15–4	Harvard; 15–14–4	15
	Preseason Oct 5	Week 1 Oct 15	Week 2 Oct 22	Week 3 Oct 29	Week 4 Nov 5	Week 5 Nov 12	Week 6 Nov 19	Week 7 Nov 26	Week 8 Dec 3	Week 9 Dec 10	Week 10 Dec 17	Week 11 Dec 31	Week 12 Jan 7	Week 13 Jan 14	Week 14 Jan 21	Week 15 Jan 28	Week 16 Feb 4	Week 17 Feb 11	Week 18 Feb 18	Week 19 Feb 25	Week 20 Mar 4	Week 21 Mar 11	Week 22 Mar 18	
		Dropped: Clarkson; 0–1–1; Dartmouth; 0–0–0	Dropped: Minnesota-Duluth; 2–2–0; Boston College; 1–3–1	Dropped: Providence; 1–4–0; Rensselaer; 1–3–0	Dropped: Dartmouth; 0–1–0	Dropped: Harvard; 1–2–1; Miami; 6–3–1	Dropped: Clarkson; 4–4–1	Dropped: None	Dropped: North Dakota; 5–7–1	Dropped: None	Dropped: None	Dropped: Ohio State; 10–7–1	Dropped: Nebraska-Omaha; 10–9–3	Dropped: None	Dropped: Boston College; 12–10–2	Dropped: Ohio State; 14–10–2	Dropped: Harvard; 9–8–3	Dropped: Nebraska-Omaha; 18–11–3; Ohio State; 14–12–4	Dropped: None	Dropped: None	Dropped: None	Dropped: Western Michigan; 19–15–4; Northeastern; 19–17–3	Dropped: Rensselaer; 20–13–4	
