= Yann Danis =

Canadian ice hockey player (born 1981)

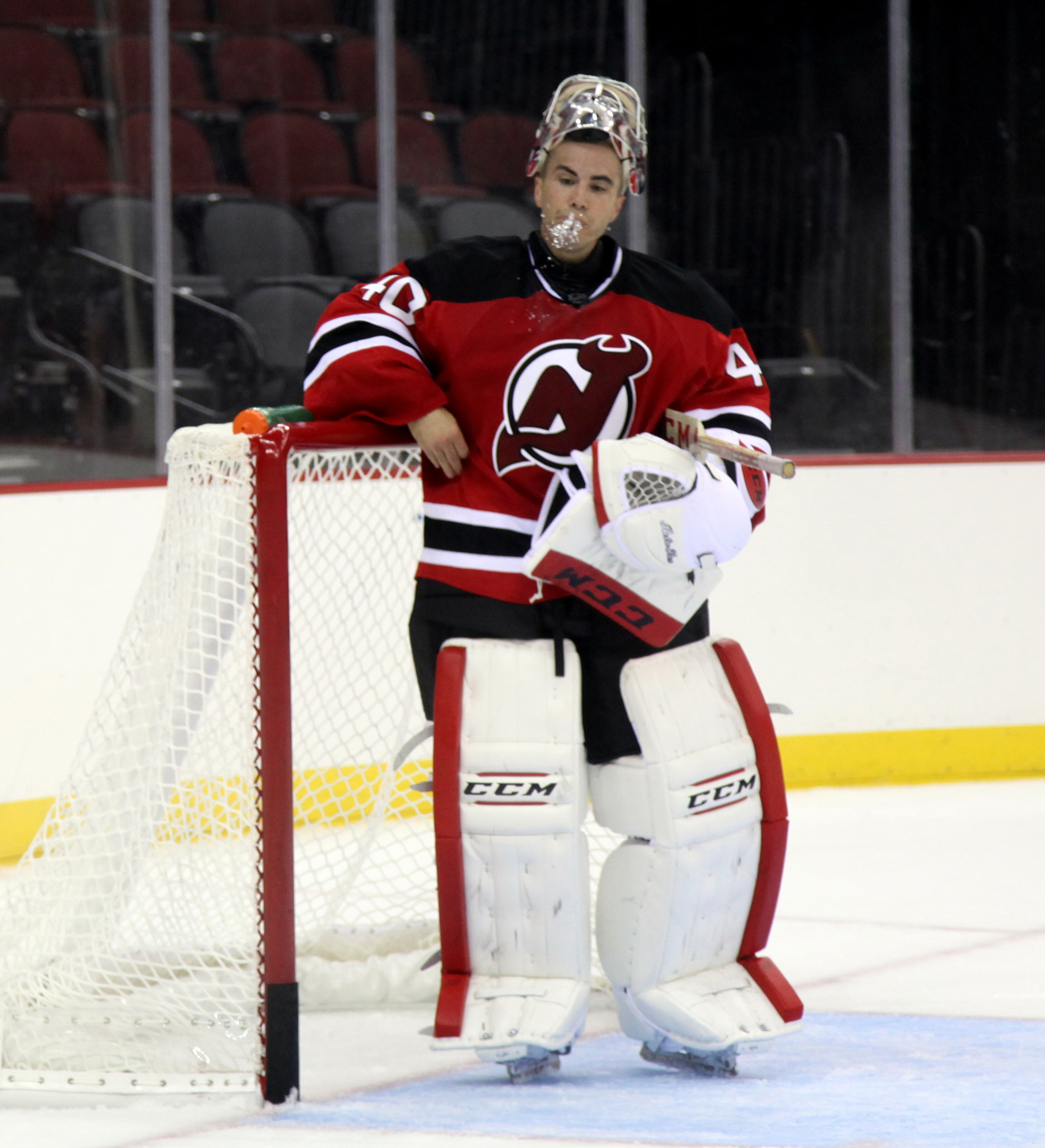
- Born: June 21, 1981 (age 45) Saint-Jérôme, Quebec, Canada
- Height: 6 ft 0 in (183 cm)
- Weight: 185 lb (84 kg; 13 st 3 lb)
- Position: Goaltender
- Caught: Left
- Played for: Montreal Canadiens; New York Islanders; New Jersey Devils; Amur Khabarovsk; Edmonton Oilers
- NHL draft: Undrafted
- Playing career: 2004–2017

Yann Joseph Richard Danis (born June 21, 1981) is a Canadian former professional ice hockey goaltender who played in the National Hockey League (NHL) for the Montreal Canadiens, New York Islanders, Edmonton Oilers, and New Jersey Devils. He played in the butterfly style of goaltending.

== Early life ==
Danis was born to Yves Danis and Ginette Boucher in Saint-Jérôme, Quebec. He is the couple's only child. Danis graduated from École Secondaire St-Joseph in Saint-Hyacinthe, a Francophone high school, in 1999. He did not start playing hockey until age seven because he was afraid of getting bodychecked. After being reassured by his parents that he would not get hit in minor hockey, however, Danis began playing as a forward at the age of seven. When he was eight, he told his parents that he wanted to switch to goaltender because, he said, "I liked the big goalie pads, and I thought having a catching glove was cool." His parents subsequently bought him the goaltending equipment for Christmas.

Danis played in the 1995 Quebec International Pee-Wee Hockey Tournament with the Sélects-du-Nord minor ice hockey team. After playing for Cap Jeunesse in 1995–96 and Polyvalente of St. Jérôme from 1996–1998, Danis was named to the Quebec Junior AAA Hockey League's seventeen-year-old all-star team in 1998–99. He then played with the Cornwall Colts of the Central Junior A Hockey League (CJHL) in 1999–2000. He led the league in goals against average during the regular season, and he was named to the Academic All-Star Team and the Rookie All-Star Team. The Colts finished first in the regular season standings, and they won the Bogart Cup (presented to the CJHL champion) as Danis posted the lowest goals against average of any CJHL goalie in the playoffs. His team competed at the Fred Page Cup (presented to the Eastern Canadian Junior "A" Champions) before the Colts finally finished in fourth place overall in Canada Junior "A" Hockey tournament.

== Playing career ==
=== College ===
Danis was first noticed by Brown University during the 1999 QJAAAHL All-Star Game. Following his year with Cornwall, he chose to attend Brown so he could focus on education along with his hockey career. In attending Brown, he became the first member of his family to attend a university. He started his career with the Brown Bears backing up Brian Eklund in goal. He took over for Eklund in the middle of the season, however, and he went 2–8–1 with a 3.60 GAA and an .888 save percentage in 12 games in a four-win season for Brown. Following the year, he was named a co-recipient of the Kevin R. Pope Memorial Trophy, presented annually by Brown University to the freshman who contributes most to the success of the team. The following year, Danis went 11–10–2 in 24 games. His 1.86 GAA and .938 save percentage (second in the nation) both set Brown single-season records, and his three shutouts (ninth in the nation) tied Brown's single season record. Brown made the playoffs that year, but they were swept by Harvard University in the first round. Danis did gain attention in the final game of the series, though, when he made 66 saves in a 2–1 defeat. Following the season, he was named Brown's most valuable player, and he became Brown's first All-American since 1992. He was also named to the ECAC All-Academic team and the New England Hockey Writers Association (NEHWA) All-Star team, and he was named Academic All-Ivy.

Danis posted a 15–14–5 record in 2003, and his .929 save percentage and his 2.31 GAA were second and eighth in the nation, respectively. He set Brown records for shutouts in a season (five, third in the nation), shutouts in a career (eight), and saves in a season (1,043). He became the fourth two-time Brown MVP winner, and he was again selected to the NEHWA All-Star team. He was selected to the All-Academic team again, and he was again named an All-American. His performance helped Brown advance for the first time since 1994 to the ECAC Final Four. In 2003–04, Danis posted a 15–11–4 record along with a 1.81 GAA and .942 save percentage that ranked third and second in the nation, respectively. Brown made it to the ECAC quarterfinals, but they were again eliminated by Harvard. However, Danis won multiple awards once again, including First Team Jofa All-American honors, All-United States College Hockey Online (USCHO) First Team honors, NEHWA All-Star honors, and First Team All-ECAC and First Team All-Ivy honors. In addition, he was named the 2004 ECAC Player and Goaltender of the Year, the USCHO Defensive Player of the Year, and the Ivy League Player of the Year. He also took home the Leonard Fowle Award as the MVP of New England, as voted on by the NEHWA, and he became the first Brown finalist for the Hobey Baker Award. During the season, Danis set ECAC records for single-season save percentage and career shutouts (13), and he tied Kevin McCabe for the most career wins by a Bears goaltender with 43. He also graduated from Brown with a degree in Public and Private Sector Economics.

=== Professional ===
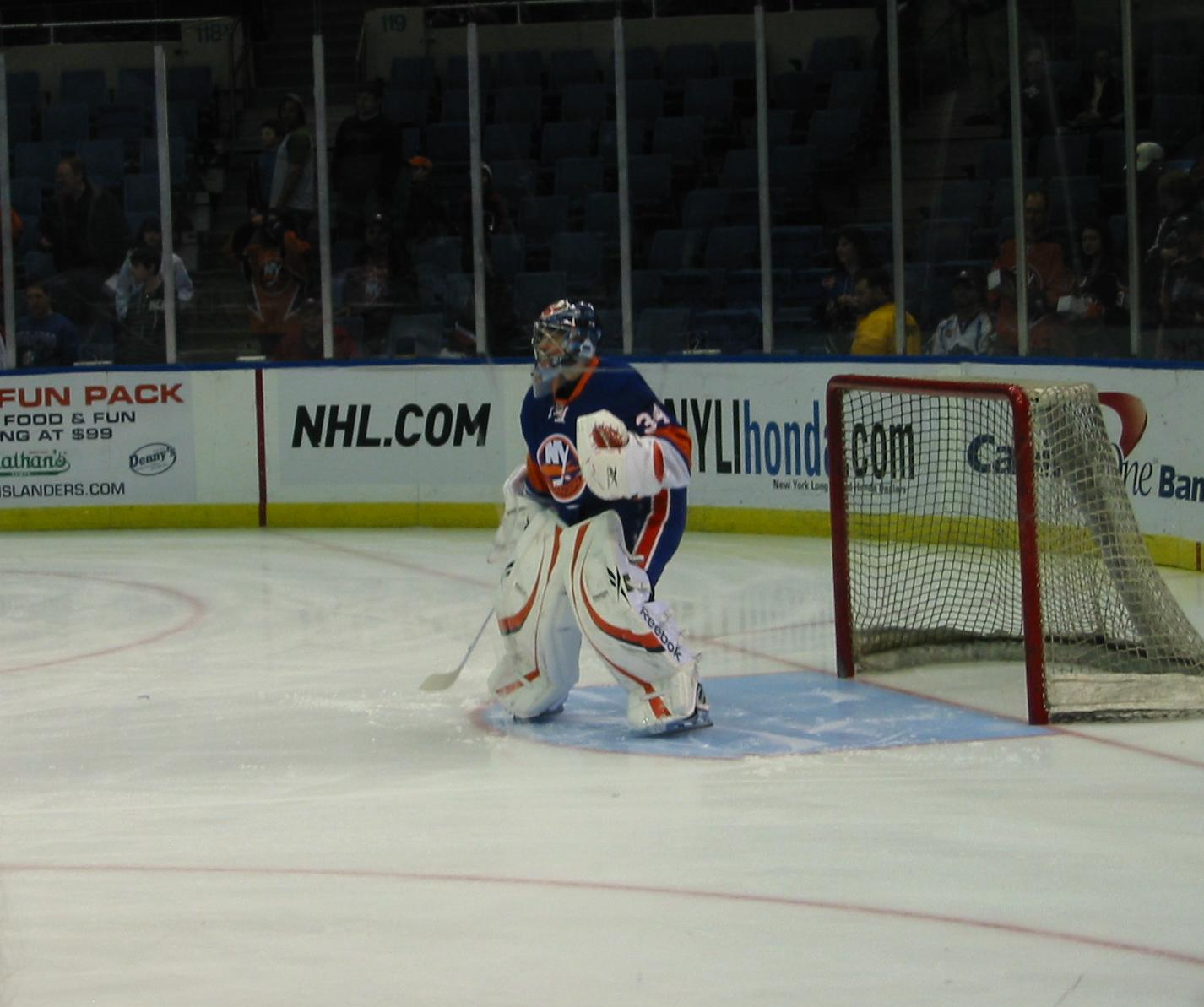
Danis during an Islander game

The Washington Capitals and the Montreal Canadiens both showed interest in Danis following his junior year in college, but he chose to remain with Brown for his senior year. Following his college career, the Canadiens were still interested in him, and he signed with them on March 19, 2004. Upon signing, he was assigned to the Hamilton Bulldogs of the American Hockey League, where he backed up Jean-François Damphousse. He started two games for Hamilton and won both of them, and he also appeared in a playoff game in relief of Damphousse.

In 2004–05, Danis became the starting goalie for the Bulldogs, as Damphousse signed with the Quebec Radio X of the Ligue Nord-Américaine de Hockey. In 53 regular season games, he had 28 wins, 17 losses, six ties, five shutouts, a 2.34 GAA, and a .924 save percentage. The Bulldogs made the playoffs that year, but they were swept in the first round by the Rochester Americans, as Danis lost all four games of the series.

Danis was the starting goalie again for the Bulldogs in 2004–05, but he was also called up by the Canadiens several times. He played in six games with Montreal in 2005–06. On October 12, 2005, Danis earned a shutout against the Atlanta Thrashers in his first NHL game.

On July 2, 2008, he signed as an unrestricted free agent with the New York Islanders. After one season in the Islanders organization, he signed with the New Jersey Devils as an unrestricted free agent on July 10, 2009.

On July 27, 2010, Danis signed with Amur Khabarovsk of the Kontinental Hockey League. The following year, he signed a one-year contract with the Edmonton Oilers of the NHL. He signed a one-year contract to remain with the Oilers on July 1, 2012. After that contract expired, Danis signed a one-year, two-way contract with the Philadelphia Flyers.

In the 2014–15 season, Danis belatedly signed as a free agent to a try-out contract with the Norfolk Admirals on November 10, 2014. After 11 games with the Admirals he was released from his try-out and signed with fellow AHL club the Hartford Wolf Pack.

On July 3, 2015, Danis returned to the New Jersey Devils organization as a free agent, signing a one-year, two-way contract. On March 14, 2016, Danis made his first NHL appearance since March 10, 2013, coming in relief of Keith Kinkaid, allowing one goal in a 7–1 loss to the Anaheim Ducks.

On October 18, 2016, Danis signed an AHL contract with the St. John's IceCaps of the Montreal Canadiens organization.

He officially announced his retirement on February 11, 2018.

== Personal life ==
Danis has a wife, Kyla, who is originally from Barbados, and two sons, Jayden and Ryder. As of 2010, they reside in Edmond, Oklahoma.

== Career statistics ==
=== Regular season and playoffs ===
			Regular season										Playoffs
Season	Team	League	GP	W	L	T	OTL	MIN	GA	SO	GAA	SV%	GP	W	L	MIN	GA	SO	GAA	SV%
2000–01	Brown University	ECAC	12	2	8	1	—	667	40	0	3.60	.888	—	—	—	—	—	—	—	—
2001–02	Brown University	ECAC	24	11	10	2	—	1451	45	3	1.86	.938	—	—	—	—	—	—	—	—
2002–03	Brown University	ECAC	34	15	14	5	—	2074	80	5	2.31	.929	—	—	—	—	—	—	—	—
2003–04	Brown University	ECAC	30	15	11	4	—	1821	55	5	1.81	.942	—	—	—	—	—	—	—	—
2003–04	Hamilton Bulldogs	AHL	2	2	0	0	—	120	3	1	1.50	.933	1	0	0	12	0	0	0.00	1.000
2004–05	Hamilton Bulldogs	AHL	53	28	17	6	—	3075	120	5	2.34	.924	4	0	4	237	13	0	3.29	.893
2005–06	Hamilton Bulldogs	AHL	39	17	17	—	3	2242	111	0	2.97	.902	—	—	—	—	—	—	—	—
2005–06	Montreal Canadiens	NHL	6	3	2	—	0	312	14	1	2.69	.908	—	—	—	—	—	—	—	—
2006–07	Hamilton Bulldogs	AHL	44	23	14	—	5	2540	119	1	2.81	.905	1	1	0	54	1	0	1.12	.944
2007–08	Hamilton Bulldogs	AHL	38	11	19	—	4	2064	113	0	3.28	.893	—	—	—	—	—	—	—	—
2008–09	Bridgeport Sound Tigers	AHL	10	7	3	—	0	611	23	0	2.26	.920	—	—	—	—	—	—	—	—
2008–09	New York Islanders	NHL	31	10	17	—	3	1760	84	2	2.86	.910	—	—	—	—	—	—	—	—
2009–10	New Jersey Devils	NHL	12	3	2	—	1	467	16	0	2.05	.923	—	—	—	—	—	—	—	—
2010–11	Amur Khabarovsk	KHL	31	8	17	—	3	1652	84	2	3.05	.910	—	—	—	—	—	—	—	—
2011–12	Oklahoma City Barons	AHL	43	26	14	—	2	2545	88	5	2.07	.924	14	8	6	842	33	1	2.35	.901
2011–12	Edmonton Oilers	NHL	1	0	0	—	0	32	2	0	3.70	.833	—	—	—	—	—	—	—	—
2012–13	Oklahoma City Barons	AHL	47	26	15	—	6	2775	120	2	2.59	.911	17	10	7	1019	41	1	2.41	.923
2012–13	Edmonton Oilers	NHL	3	1	0	—	0	110	7	0	3.82	.881	—	—	—	—	—	—	—	—
2013–14	Adirondack Phantoms	AHL	31	9	11	—	4	1514	76	2	3.01	.897	—	—	—	—	—	—	—	—
2014–15	Norfolk Admirals	AHL	11	5	6	—	0	640	29	2	2.72	.914	—	—	—	—	—	—	—	—
2014–15	Hartford Wolf Pack	AHL	24	12	7	—	4	1428	56	2	2.35	.921	14	7	7	887	35	0	2.37	.918
2015–16	Albany Devils	AHL	47	28	12	—	5	2681	99	8	2.22	.908	1	0	0	20	2	0	6.00	.778
2015–16	New Jersey Devils	NHL	2	0	1	—	0	50	4	0	4.75	.778	—	—	—	—	—	—	—	—
2016–17	St. John's IceCaps	AHL	25	11	9	—	5	1487	74	1	2.99	.902	—	—	—	—	—	—	—	—
NHL totals			55	17	22	—	4	2733	127	3	2.79	.908	—	—	—	—	—	—	—	—

== Awards and honours ==
Award	Year
College
All-ECAC Hockey Second Team	2001–02
AHCA East Second-Team All-American	2001–02
All-ECAC Hockey Second Team	2002–03
ECAC Hockey All-Tournament Team	2003
All-ECAC Hockey First Team	2003–04
AHCA East First-Team All-American	2003–04

Awards and achievements
Preceded by Chris Higgins; David LeNeveu	ECAC Hockey Player of the Year; 2003–04	Succeeded by David McKee
Preceded by David LeNeveu	Ken Dryden Award; 2003–04	Succeeded by David McKee
Preceded by Brad Thiessen	Aldege "Baz" Bastien Memorial Award; 2011–12	Succeeded by Niklas Svedberg
