= List of Carolina Hurricanes players =

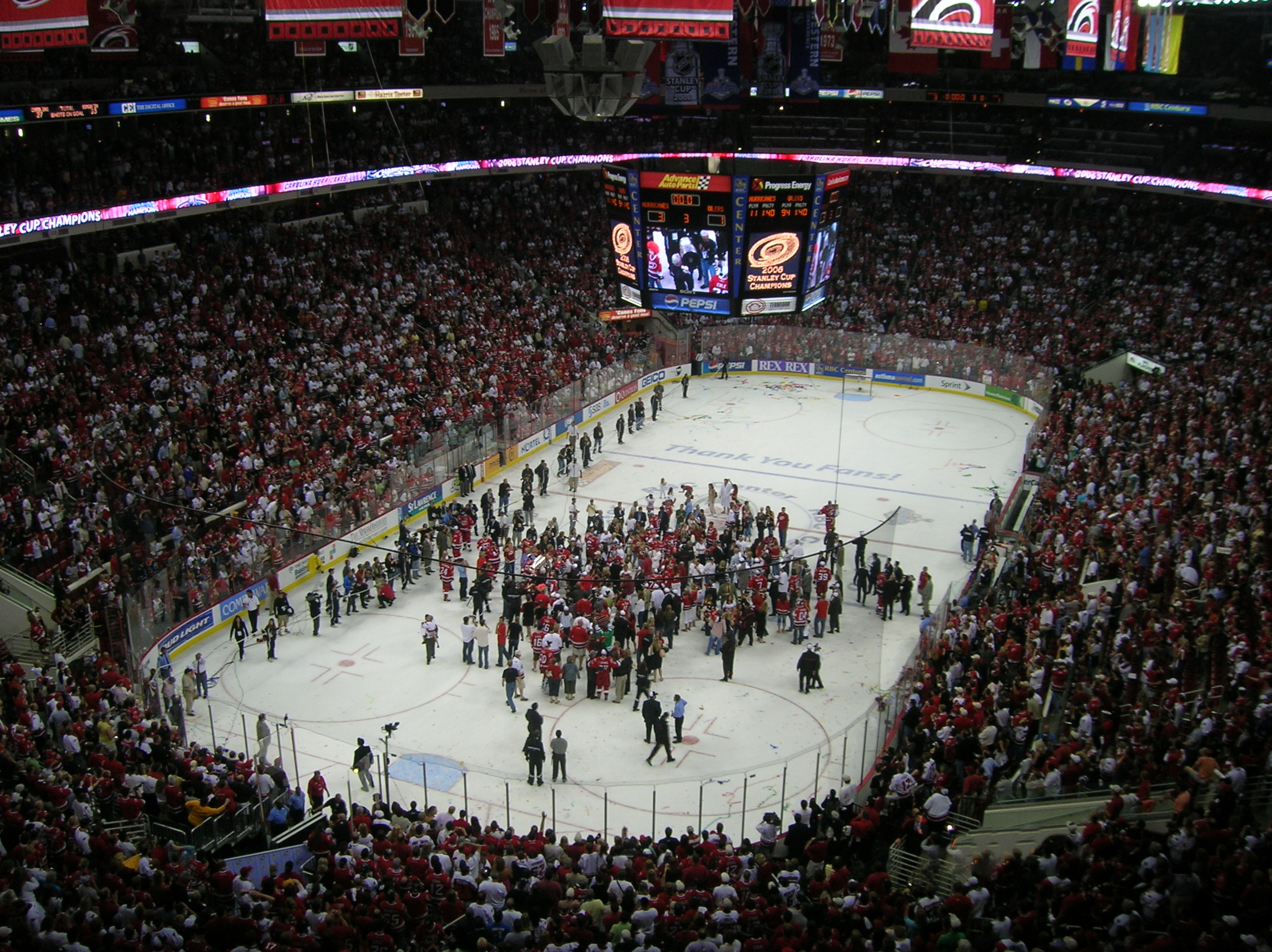
The RBC Center following Carolina's Stanley Cup victory

This is a complete list of ice hockey players who have played for the Carolina Hurricanes in the National Hockey League (NHL). It includes players that have played at least one match, either in the NHL regular season or in the NHL playoffs. This list does not include players from the Hartford Whalers of the NHL (1979–80 to 1996–97) and New England Whalers of the WHA (1972–73 to 1978–79).

== Key ==
- * Appeared in a Canes game during the 2025–2026 season.
- † Stanley Cup Champion, Hockey Hall of Famer, or retired number.

Abbreviations
GP	Games played
Ret	Retired jersey
SC	Stanley Cup Champion

Goaltenders
W	Wins
SO	Shutouts
L	Losses
GAA	Goals against average
T	Ties
OTL ^{a}	Overtime losses
SV%	Save percentage

Skaters
Pos	Position	RW	Right wing	A	Assists
D	Defenseman	C	Center	P	Points
LW	Left wing	G	Goals	PIM	Penalty minutes

The "Seasons" column lists the first year of the season of the player's first game and the last year of the season of the player's last game. For example, a player who played one game in the 2000–2001 season would be listed as playing with the team from 2000–2001, regardless of what calendar year the game occurred within.

Statistics complete as of the 2025–2026 NHL season.

== Goaltenders ==
Goalie	Nationality	Seasons	Regular season								Playoffs						Notes
Goalie	Nationality	Seasons	GP	W	L	T	OTL	SO	GAA	SV%	GP	W	L	SO	GAA	SV%	Notes
Andersen, Frederik*^{†}	Denmark	2021–2026	159	98	49	—	10	9	2.45	.906	48	32	14	5	2.07	.909	SC 2026
Alves, Jorge	United States	2016–2017	1	0	0	—	0	0	0.00	.000	—	—	—	—	—	—	
Ayres, David	Canada	2019–2020	1	1	0	—	0	0	4.18	.800	—	—	—	—	—	—	
Barrasso, Tom	United States	2001–2002	34	13	12	5	—	2	2.61	.906	—	—	—	—	—	—	
Boucher, Brian	United States	2011–2012	10	1	6	—	0	1	3.40	.881	—	—	—	—	—	—	
Burke, Sean	Canada	1997–1998	25	7	11	5	—	0	2.80	.899	—	—	—	—	—	—	
Bussi, Brandon*^{†}	United States	2025–2026	39	31	6	—	2	2	2.47	.894	4	3	1	1	1.60	.931	SC 2026
Darling, Scott	United States	2017–2019	51	15	25	—	9	0	3.20	.887	—	—	—	—	—	—	
DesRochers, Patrick	Canada	2002–2003	2	1	1	0	—	0	3.44	.901	—	—	—	—	—	—	
Ellis, Dan	Canada	2012–2013	19	6	8	—	2	1	3.13	.906	—	—	—	—	—	—	
Fichaud, Eric	Canada	1999–2000	9	3	5	1	—	1	2.94	.883	—	—	—	—	—	—	
Fitzpatrick, Mark	Canada	1999–2000	3	0	2	0	—	0	4.49	.882	—	—	—	—	—	—	
Forsberg, Anton	Sweden	2019–2020	3	1	1	—	0	0	3.35	.897	—	—	—	—	—	—	
Fountain, Mike	Canada	1997–1998	3	0	3	0	—	0	3.68	.853	—	—	—	—	—	—	
Gerber, Martin^{†}	Switzerland	2005–2006	60	38	14	—	6	3	2.78	.906	6	1	1	1	3.53	.856	SC 2006
Grahame, John	United States	2006–2008	45	15	20	—	3	0	3.17	.889	—	—	—	—	—	—	
Irbe, Arturs	Latvia	1998–2004	309	130	122	44	—	20	2.49	.906	30	14	16	1	2.11	.925	
Jablonski, Pat	United States	1997–1998	5	1	4	0	—	0	3.01	.878	—	—	—	—	—	—	
Khudobin, Anton	Russia	2013—2015	70	27	31	—	7	2	2.50	.914	—	—	—	—	—	—	
Kidd, Trevor	Canada	1997–1999	72	28	31	9	—	5	2.34	.916	—	—	—	—	—	—	
Kochetkov, Pyotr*†	Russia	2021–2026	125	71	38	—	12	11	2.46	.904	10	2	5	0	3.83	.860	SC 2026
Lack, Eddie	Sweden	2015–2017	54	20	21	—	9	3	2.75	.902	—	—	—	—	—	—	
LaFontaine, Jack	Canada	2021–2022	2	0	1	—	0	0	7.20	.780	—	—	—	—	—	—	
Leighton, Michael	Canada	2007–2010; 2016–2017	33	10	14	—	2	0	3.23	.887	—	—	—	—	—	—	
Legace, Manny	Canada	2009–2010	28	10	7	—	5	1	2.81	.907	—	—	—	—	—	—	
Lyon, Alex	United States	2021–2022	2	1	0	—	1	0	2.93	.908	—	—	—	—	—	—	
Martin, Spencer	Canada	2023–2025	15	7	5	—	2	1	3.30	.869	—	—	—	—	—	—	
McElhinney, Curtis	Canada	2018–2019	33	20	11	—	2	2	2.58	.912	5	3	2	0	2.01	.930	
McLean, Kirk	Canada	1997–1998	8	4	2	0	—	0	3.29	.878	—	—	—	—	—	—	
Moss, Tyler	Canada	2000–2001	12	1	6	—	0	0	3.99	.853	—	—	—	—	—	—	
Mrazek, Petr	Czech Republic	2018–2021	92	50	32	—	8	10	2.48	.911	18	8	9	2	2.67	.902	
Murphy, Mike	Canada	2011–2012	2	0	1	—	0	0	0.00	1.000	—	—	—	—	—	—	
Nedeljkovic, Alex	United States	2016–2017; 2018–2021	29	17	7	—	4	3	2.01	.928	9	4	5	1	2.17	.920	
Perets, Yaniv	Canada	2023–2025	2	0	0	—	0	0	2.86	.875	—	—	—	—	—	—	
Peters, Justin	Canada	2009–2014	68	22	31	—	8	3	3.05	.904	—	—	—	—	—	—	
Raanta, Antti	Finland	2021–2024	79	46	15	—	9	7	2.53	.901	19	9	8	1	2.34	.918	
Reimer, James	Canada	2019–2021	47	29	11	—	4	3	2.66	.910	3	2	1	0	2.36	.934	
Storr, Jamie	Canada	2003–2004	14	0	8	2	—	0	2.91	.878	—	—	—	—	—	—	
Tokarski, Dustin	Canada	2024–2025	6	4	2	—	0	1	2.18	.902	—	—	—	—	—	—	
Ward, Cam^{†}	Canada	2005–2018	668	318	244	—	84	27	2.70	.909	41	23	18	4	2.38	.917	Conn Smythe Trophy — 2006; SC 2006
Weekes, Kevin	Canada	2001–2004	119	39	54	20	—	11	2.41	.912	8	3	2	2	1.62	.939	

== Skaters ==
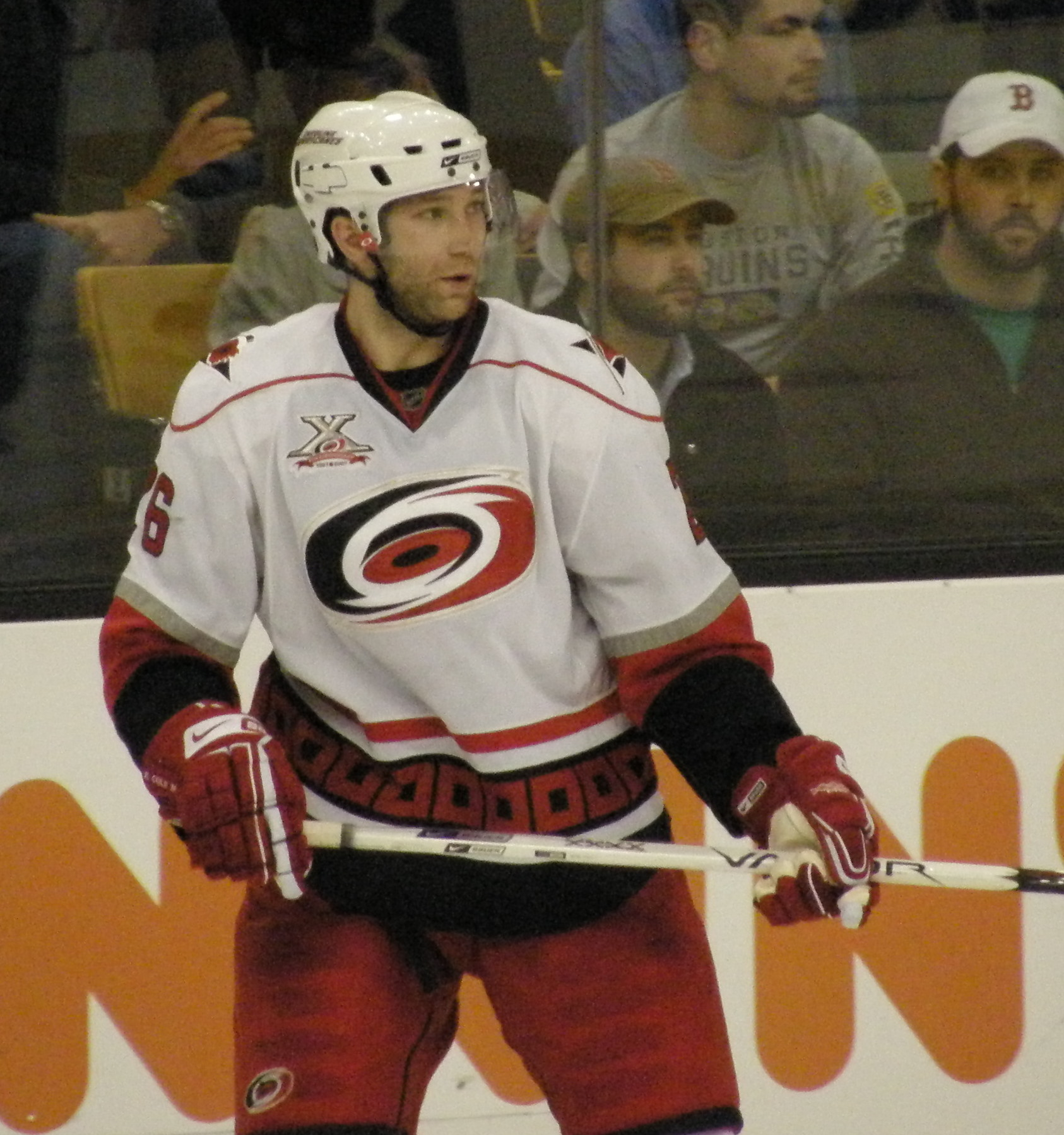
Erik Cole

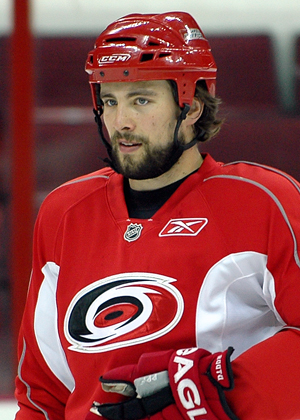
Tuomo Ruutu

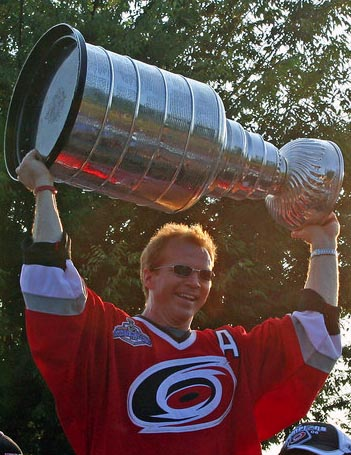
Glen Wesley

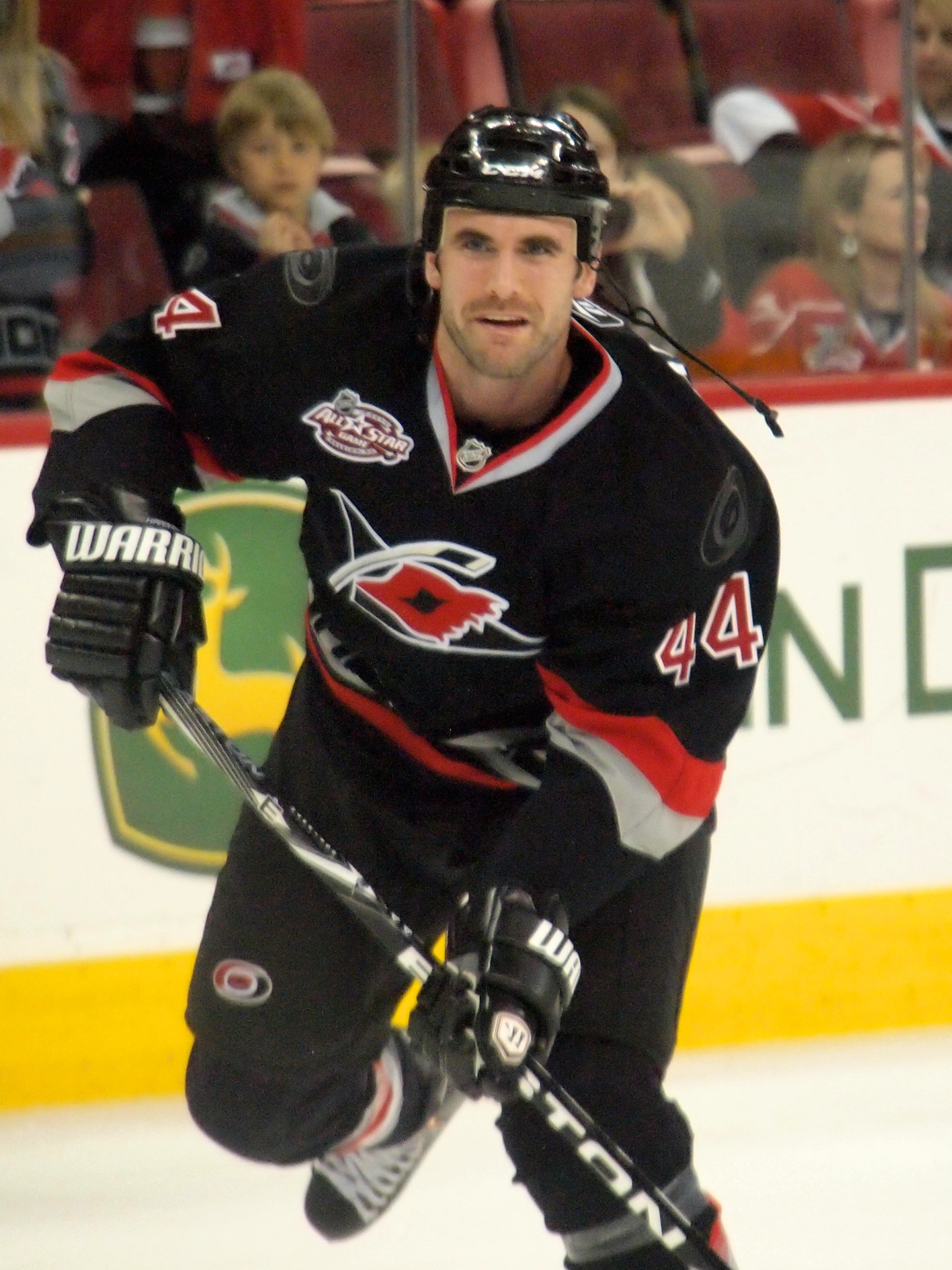
Jay Harrison

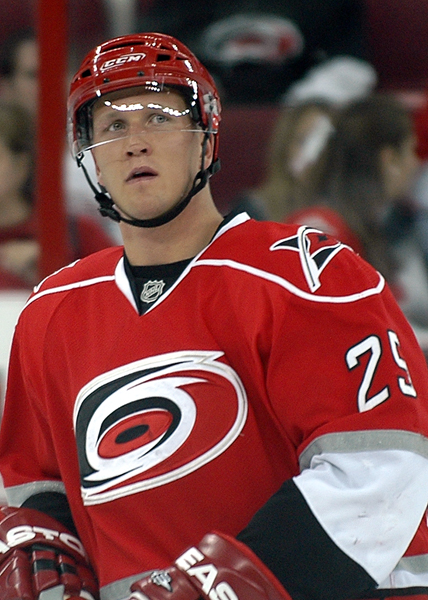
Joni Pitkanen

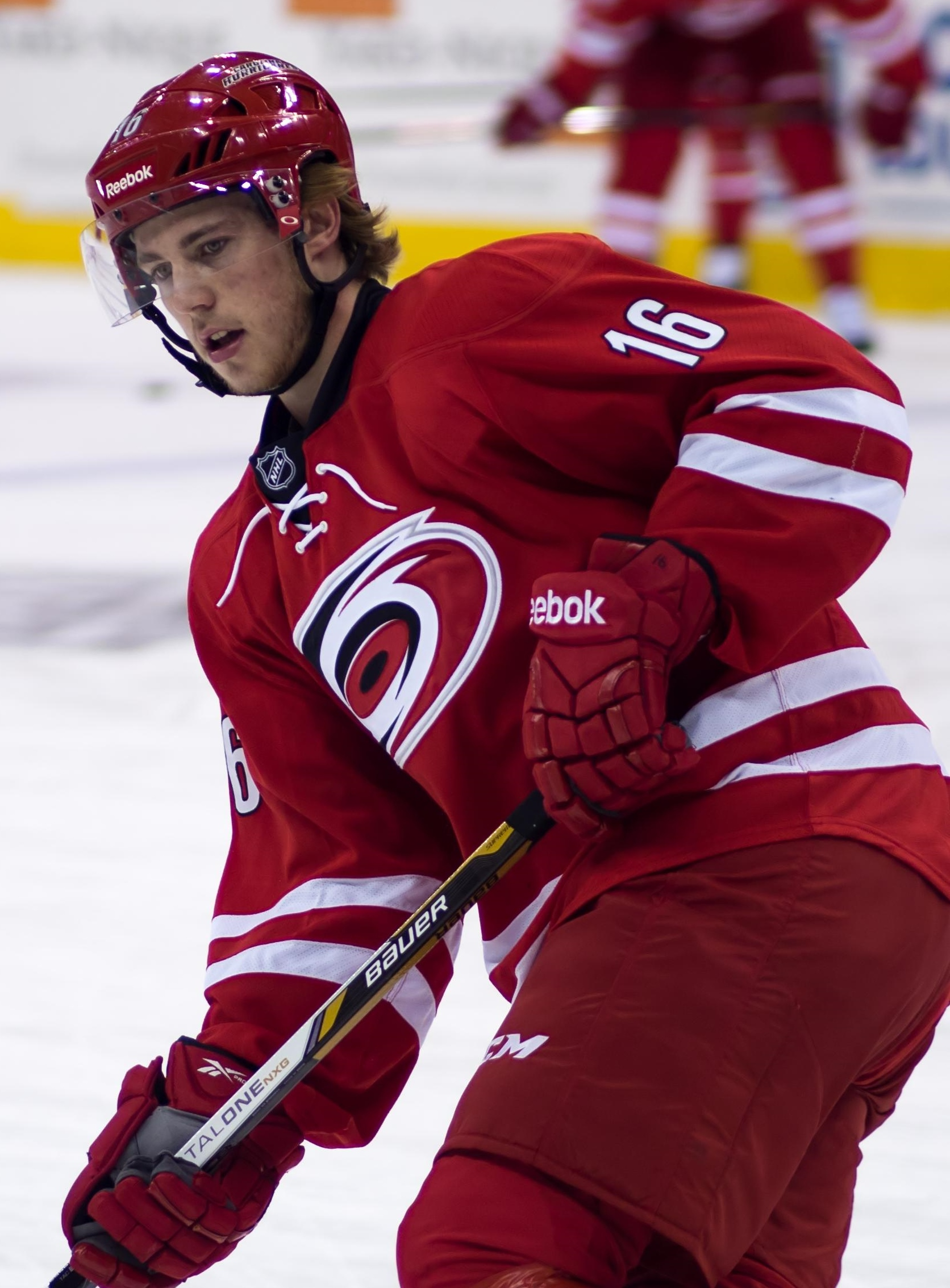
Elias Lindholm

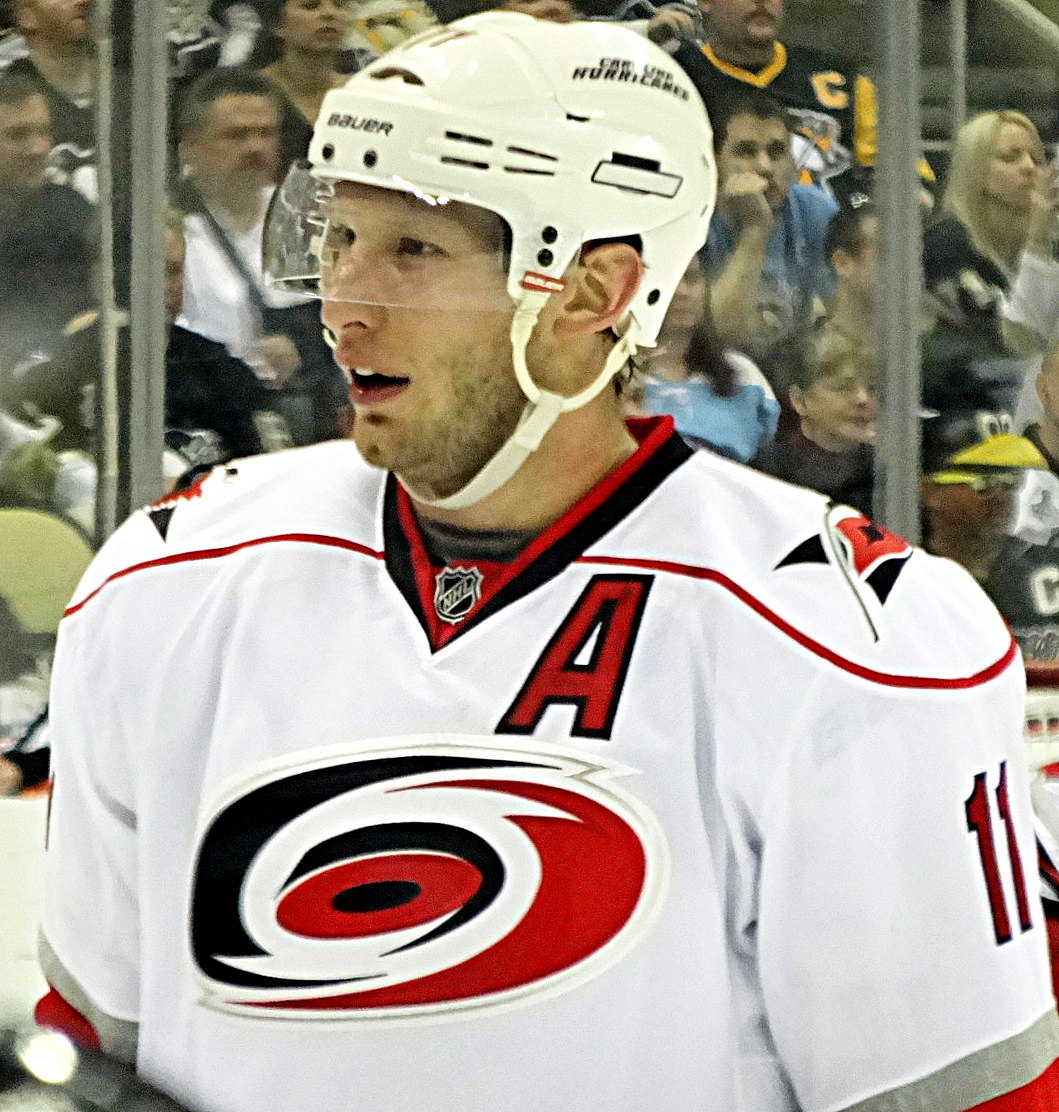
Jordan Staal

Skater	Nat	Pos	Seasons	Regular season					Playoffs					Notes
Skater	Nat	Pos	Seasons	GP	G	A	P	PIM	GP	G	A	P	PIM	Notes
Adams, Craig^{†}	Canada	RW	2000–2008	427	33	44	77	337	26	0	0	0	10	SC 2006
Adams, Kevyn^{†}	United States	LW	2001–2007	300	38	34	72	168	48	1	0	1	18	SC 2006
Aho, Sebastian*^{†}	Finland	LW	2016–2026	756	310	401	711	342	108	39	58	97	62	SC 2026
Alberts, Andrew	United States	D	2009–2010	62	2	8	10	74	—	—	—	—	—	
Allen, Bryan	Canada	D	2010–2012	101	1	18	19	95	—	—	—	—	—	
Aucoin, Keith	United States	RW	2005–2008	53	5	10	15	14	—	—	—	—	—	
Babchuk, Anton^{†}	Russia	D	2005–2007; 2008–2009; 2010–2011	163	24	38	62	64	13	0	1	1	10	SC 2006
Battaglia, Bates	United States	LW	1997–2003	402	63	87	150	281	35	5	14	19	24	
Bayda, Ryan	Canada	LW	2002–2004; 2006–2009	179	16	24	40	94	15	2	2	4	18	
Bean, Jake	Canada	D	2018–2019; 2020–2021	44	1	11	12	12	11	1	0	1	4	
Bear, Ethan	Canada	D	2021–2022	58	5	9	14	20	—	—	—	—	—	
Belanger, Eric	Canada	C	2006–2007	56	8	12	20	14	—	—	—	—	—	
Bellemore, Brett	Canada	D	2012–2015	121	4	16	20	79	—	—	—	—	—	
Bergeron, Marc-Andre	Canada	D	2012–2013	13	0	4	4	5	—	—	—	—	—	
Bickell, Bryan	Canada	RW	2016–2017	11	1	0	1	4	—	—	—	—	—	
Biega, Danny	Canada	D	2014–2016	10	0	2	2	0	—	—	—	—	—	
Bishop, Clark	Canada	C	2018–2020	25	1	3	4	10	2	0	0	0	0	
Blake, Jackson*^{†}	United States	RW	2023–2026	162	39	48	87	70	34	10	16	26	40	SC 2026
Blanchard, Nicolas	Canada	LW	2012–2013	9	0	0	0	20	—	—	—	—	—	
Bodie, Troy	Canada	RW	2010–2011	50	1	2	3	54	—	—	—	—	—	
Borer, Casey	United States	D	2007–2010	16	1	2	3	9	—	—	—	—	—	
Boughner, Bob	Canada	D	2003–2004	43	0	5	5	80	—	—	—	—	—	
Boulerice, Jesse	United States	RW	2002–2006	150	8	2	10	286	—	—	—	—	—	
Bowman, Drayson	Canada	LW	2009–2014	176	15	18	33	53	—	—	—	—	—	
Boychuk, Zach	Canada	C	2008–2016	115	11	17	28	10	—	—	—	—	—	
Brendl, Pavel	Czech Republic	RW	2002–2004	26	5	4	9	10	—	—	—	—	—	
Brent, Tim	Canada	C	2011–2012	79	12	12	24	27	—	—	—	—	—	
Brind'Amour, Rod^{†}	Canada	C	1999–2010	694	174	299	473	398	72	18	20	38	46	Ret — #17; SC 2006
Brind'Amour, Skyler*	United States	C	2024–2026	6	1	0	1	4	—	—	—	—	—	
Brookbank, Wade	Canada	D	2007–2009	59	2	1	3	116	—	—	—	—	—	
Brown, Jeff	Canada	D	1997–1998	32	3	10	13	16	—	—	—	—	—	
Brown, Kevin	Canada	RW	1997–1998	4	0	0	0	0	—	—	—	—	—	
Brown, Patrick	United States	C	2014–2017	28	1	1	2	8	—	—	—	—	—	
Bunting, Michael	Canada	LW	2023–2024	60	13	23	36	55	—	—	—	—	—	
Burke, Callahan	United States	C	2023–2024	1	0	0	0	0	—	—	—	—	—	
Burns, Brent	Canada	D	2022–2025	246	34	99	133	92	41	4	14	18	32	
Burt, Adam	United States	D	1997–1999	127	1	14	15	152	—	—	—	—	—	
Carrick, Trevor	Canada	D	2015–2019	4	0	0	0	7	—	—	—	—	—	
Carrier, William*^{†}	Canada	LW	2024–2026	113	11	18	29	34	34	0	4	4	8	SC 2026
Carson, Brett	Canada	D	2008–2011	72	2	10	12	20	—	—	—	—	—	
Carter, Anson	Canada	RW	2006–2007	10	1	0	1	2	—	—	—	—	—	
Carter, Ryan	United States	C	2010–2011	32	0	3	3	22	—	—	—	—	—	
Chatfield, Jalen*^{†}	United States	D	2021–2026	317	23	51	74	139	54	3	12	15	44	SC 2026
Chiasson, Steve	Canada	D	1997–1999	94	8	35	43	81	6	1	1	2	2	
Ciccone, Enrico	Canada	D	1997–1998	14	0	3	3	83	—	—	—	—	—	
Coffey, Paul	Canada	D	1998–2000	113	13	37	50	68	5	0	1	1	2	HHOF
Coghlan, Dylan	Canada	D	2022–2024	18	0	3	3	2	—	—	—	—	—	
Cole, Erik^{†}	United States	LW	2001–2008; 2008–2011	475	142	169	311	445	43	6	8	14	52	SC 2006
Cole, Ian	United States	D	2021–2022	75	2	17	19	83	14	1	1	2	10	
Commodore, Mike^{†}	Canada	D	2005–2008	195	13	41	54	325	25	2	2	4	33	SC 2006
Comtois, Max	Canada	LW	2023–2024	1	0	1	1	0	1	0	0	0	0	
Conboy, Tim	United States	D	2007–2010	59	0	6	6	121	3	0	0	0	9	
Corvo, Joe	United States	D	2007–2010; 2010–2011; 2012–2013	260	42	86	128	68	18	2	5	7	4	
Cullen, Matt^{†}	United States	C	2005–2006; 2007–2010	266	72	109	181	118	43	7	17	24	14	SC 2006
Dahlbeck, Klas	Sweden	D	2016–2018	76	3	8	11	51	—	—	—	—	—	
Dalpe, Zac	Canada	C	2010–2013	41	5	5	10	4	—	—	—	—	—	
Daniels, Jeff	Canada	LW	1997–1998; 1999–2003	262	8	10	18	45	29	0	3	3	2	
DeAngelo, Tony	Canada	D	2021–2022; 2023–2024	95	13	49	62	80	23	1	11	12	18	
DeFauw, Brad	United States	LW	2002–2003	9	3	0	3	2	—	—	—	—	—	
de Haan, Calvin	Canada	D	2018–2019; 2022–2023	127	3	23	26	40	12	1	0	1	2	
Deslauriers, Nicolas*^{†}	Canada	LW	2025–2026	7	0	1	1	5	1	0	0	0	4	SC 2026
Di Giuseppe, Phillip	Canada	LW	2015–2019	147	14	27	41	58	—	—	—	—	—	
DiMaio, Rob	Canada	RW	2000–2001	74	6	18	24	54	6	0	0	0	4	
Dineen, Kevin	Canada	RW	1997–1999	121	15	26	41	202	6	0	0	0	8	
Dingman, Chris	Canada	LW	2001–2002	30	0	1	1	77	—	—	—	—	—	
Domi, Max	Canada	LW	2021–2022	19	2	5	7	18	14	3	3	6	4	
Druken, Harold	Canada	C	2002–2003	14	0	1	1	2	—	—	—	—	—	
Drury, Jack	United States	C	2021–2025	153	15	31	46	61	24	1	7	8	12	
Dvorak, Radek	Czech Republic	RW	2013-2014	60	4	5	9	41	—	—	—	—	—	
Dwyer, Patrick	United States	RW	2008–2015	416	42	51	93	77	2	0	1	1	0	
Dzingel, Ryan	United States	C	2019–2021	75	10	23	33	32	4	0	0	0	2	
Eaves, Patrick	Canada	RW	2007–2009	85	7	12	19	35	18	1	2	3	13	
Edmundson, Joel	Canada	D	2019–2020	68	7	13	20	72	4	1	0	1	2	
Ehlers, Nikolaj*^{†}	Denmark	LW	2025–2026	82	26	45	71	14	18	8	10	18	6	SC 2026
Emerson, Nelson	Canada	RW	1997–1999	116	29	37	66	86	—	—	—	—	—	
Fast, Brad	Canada	D	2003–2004	1	1	0	1	0	—	—	—	—	—	
Fast, Jesper	Sweden	RW	2020–2024	281	36	65	101	50	40	8	5	13	2	
Faulk, Justin	United States	D	2011–2019	559	85	173	258	265	15	1	7	8	4	
Fensore, Domenick*	United States	D	2024–2026	3	0	0	0	2	—	—	—	—	—	
Ferland, Micheal	Canada	LW	2018–2019	71	17	23	40	58	7	0	1	1	18	
Fleury, Haydn	Canada	D	2017–2021	167	5	19	24	30	17	2	0	2	8	
Foegele, Warren	Canada	LW	2017–2021	200	35	33	68	74	33	7	5	12	18	
Francis, Ron^{†}	Canada	C	1998–2004	472	118	236	354	146	29	6	11	17	6	Ret — #10 Retired; HHOF
Frk, Martin	Czech Republic	RW	2016–2017	2	0	0	0	0	—	—	—	—	—	
Gardiner, Jake	United States	D	2019–2021	94	4	28	32	41	7	0	1	1	2	
Gauthier, Julien	Canada	RW	2019–2020	5	0	1	1	6	—	—	—	—	—	
Geekie, Morgan	Canada	C	2019–2021	38	6	7	13	12	11	0	1	1	0	
Gelinas, Martin	Canada	LW	1997–2002	348	75	90	165	226	35	3	8	11	18	
Gerbe, Nathan	United States	LW	2013–2016	206	29	37	66	84	—	—	—	—	—	
Gibbons, Brian	United States	C	2019–2020	15	0	0	0	4	—	—	—	—	—	
Gleason, Tim	United States	D	2006–2015	546	14	93	107	537	18	1	4	5	32	
Goertzen, Steven	Canada	RW	2009–2010	6	0	0	0	5	—	—	—	—	—	
Gostisbehere, Shayne*^{†}	United States	D	2022–2023; 2024–2026	148	23	82	105	78	49	6	18	24	24	SC 2026
Gove, David	United States	LW	2005–2007	2	0	1	1	0	—	—	—	—	—	
Gragnani, Marc-Andre	Canada	D	2012–2013	1	0	0	0	0	—	—	—	—	—	
Grimson, Stu	Canada	LW	1997–1998	82	3	4	7	204	—	—	—	—	—	
Guentzel, Jake	United States	C	2023–2024	17	8	17	25	8	11	4	5	9	16	
Hainsey, Ron	United States	D	2013–2017	300	15	43	58	115	—	—	—	—	—	
Hakanpaa, Jani	Finland	D	2020–2021	15	2	1	3	4	11	0	0	0	4	
Halko, Steven	Canada	D	1997–2003	155	0	15	15	71	4	0	0	0	2	
Hall, Adam	Canada	RW	2012–2013	6	0	0	0	0	—	—	—	—	—	
Hall, Taylor*^{†}	Canada	LW	2024–2026	111	27	39	66	64	34	9	16	25	16	SC 2026
Haller, Kevin	Canada	D	1997–1998	65	3	5	8	94	—	—	—	—	—	
Hamilton, Dougie	Canada	D	2018–2021	184	42	79	121	121	31	6	8	14	26	
Hamilton, Jeff	United States	C	2007–2008	58	9	15	24	10	—	—	—	—	—	
Hanifin, Noah	United States	D	2015–2018	239	18	65	83	69	—	—	—	—	—	
Harrison, Jay	Canada	D	2009–2015	317	21	47	68	319	—	—	—	—	—	
Hatcher, Kevin	United States	D	2000–2001	57	4	14	18	38	6	0	0	0	6	
Haula, Erik	Finland	LW	2019–2020	41	12	10	22	20	—	—	—	—	—	
Hedican, Bret^{†}	United States	D	2001–2008	369	19	82	101	313	48	3	13	16	62	SC 2006
Heerema, Jeff	Canada	RW	2002–2003	10	3	0	3	2	—	—	—	—	—	
Helminen, Dwight	United States	C	2008–2009	23	1	1	2	0	1	0	0	0	0	
Hill, Sean	United States	D	1997–2000; 2001–2004	369	38	119	157	441	23	4	4	8	20	
Hillen, Jack	United States	D	2014–2015	3	0	0	0	0	—	—	—	—	—	
Hlavac, Jan	Czech Republic	LW	2002–2003	52	9	15	24	22	—	—	—	—	—	
Holden, Josh	Canada	C	2001–2002	8	0	0	0	2	—	—	—	—	—	
Hutchinson, Andrew^{†}	United States	D	2005–2007	77	6	19	25	48	—	—	—	—	—	SC 2006
Jaaska, Juha	Finland	F	2024–2025	18	0	4	4	9	—	—	—	—	—	
Jankowski, Mark*^{†}	Canada	C	2024–2026	87	19	10	29	34	26	1	5	6	16	SC 2026
Jarvis, Seth*^{†}	Canada	C	2021–2026	375	128	151	279	83	74	23	31	54	14	SC 2026
Jensen, Joe	United States	C	2007–2008	6	1	0	1	2	—	—	—	—	—	
Jokinen, Jussi	Finland	LW	2008–2013	288	68	117	185	144	18	7	4	11	2	
Jooris, Josh	Canada	C	2017–2018	31	3	3	6	16	—	—	—	—	—	
Jordan, Michal	Czech Republic	D	2012–2016	79	3	4	7	18	—	—	—	—	—	
Joslin, Derek	Canada	D	2010–2012	61	3	6	9	37	—	—	—	—	—	
Jost, Tyson	Canada	C	2024–2025	39	4	5	9	33	—	—	—	—	—	
Kaberle, Frantisek^{†}	Czech Republic	D	2005–2009	214	9	73	82	104	32	4	10	14	10	SC 2006
Kaberle, Tomas	Czech Republic	D	2011–2012	29	0	9	9	2	—	—	—	—	—	
Kapanen, Sami	Finland	RW	1997–2003	440	127	187	314	97	34	4	12	16	6	
Karpa, Dave	Canada	D	1998–2001	140	5	12	17	266	8	0	0	0	19	
Kase, Ondrej	Czech Republic	RW	2022–2023	1	0	0	0	0	—	—	—	—	—	
Keane, Joey	United States	D	2020–2022	2	0	0	0	2	—	—	—	—	—	
Koehler, Greg	Canada	C	2000–2001	1	0	0	0	0	—	—	—	—	—	
Komisarek, Mike	United States	D	2013-2014	32	0	4	4	14	—	—	—	—		
Kostopoulos, Tom	Canada	RW	2009–2011	99	9	16	25	136	—	—	—	—	—	
Kotkaniemi, Jesperi*	Finland	C	2021–2026	347	56	85	141	181	54	3	11	14	28	
Kovalenko, Andrei	Russia	RW	1998–2000	94	21	30	51	38	4	1	1	2	2	
Kron, Robert	Czech Republic	C	1997–2000	237	38	63	101	30	5	1	1	2	0	
Kruger, Marcus	Sweden	C	2017–2018	48	1	5	6	28	—	—	—	—	—	
Kuokkanen, Janne	Finland	C/LW	2017–2019	11	0	0	0	4	—	—	—	—	—	
Kurka, Tomas	Czech Republic	LW	2002–2004	17	3	2	5	2	—	—	—	—	—	
Kuznetsov, Evgeny	Russia	C	2023–2024	20	2	5	7	6	10	4	2	6	4	
Kuznik, Greg	Canada	D	2000–2001	1	0	0	0	0	—	—	—	—	—	
LaCouture, Dan	United States	LW	2008–2009	11	2	0	2	10	—	—	—	—	—	
Ladd, Andrew^{†}	Canada	LW	2005–2008	137	26	24	50	81	17	2	3	5	4	SC 2006
Lajoie, Maxime	Canada	D	2021–2023	8	0	0	0	0	2	0	0	0	2	
Langdon, Darren	Canada	LW	2000–2003	121	2	3	5	216	4	0	0	0	12	
LaRose, Chad^{†}	United States	C	2005–2015	508	85	95	180	286	39	4	8	12	26	SC 2006
Leach, Stephen	United States	RW	1997–1998	45	4	5	9	42	—	—	—	—	—	
Legault, Charles-Alexis*	Canada	D	2025–2026	12	1	1	2	15	—	—	—	—	—	
Leivo, Josh	Canada	LW	2021–2022	7	1	2	3	2	—	—	—	—	—	
Lemieux, Brendan	Canada	LW	2023–2024	32	3	2	5	64	—	—	—	—	—	
Leschyshyn, Curtis	Canada	D	1997–2000	191	4	19	23	109	6	0	0	0	6	
Letowski, Trevor	Canada	RW	2006–2008	136	11	15	26	48	—	—	—	—	—	
Liles, John-Michael	United States	D	2013–2016	156	10	36	46	38	—	—	—	—	—	
Lindholm, Elias	Sweden	C	2013–2018	374	64	124	188	76	—	—	—	—	—	
Loktionov, Andrei	Russia	C	2013–2014	20	3	7	10	2	—	—	—	—	—	
Lorentz, Steven	Canada	C/LW	2020–2022	112	10	11	21	16	16	0	3	3	21	
Lowe, Keegan	United States	D	2014–2015	2	0	0	0	10	—	—	—	—	—	
Luostarinen, Eetu	Finland	C	2019–2020	8	0	1	1	0	—	—	—	—	—	
Lysak, Brett	Canada	C	2003–2004	2	0	0	0	2	—	—	—	—	—	
MacDonald, Craig	Canada	C	1998–1999; 2001–2003	58	2	4	6	20	5	0	0	0	2	
Maenalanen, Saku	Finland	RW	2018–2019	34	4	4	8	20	9	0	1	1	6	
Malec, Tomas	Slovakia	D	2002–2004	43	0	2	2	45	—	—	—	—	—	
Malhotra, Manny	Canada	C	2013–2014	69	7	6	13	18	—	—	—	—	—	
Malik, Marek	Czech Republic	D	1998–2003	262	16	54	70	237	30	0	3	3	28	
Malone, Brad	Canada	C/LW	2014–2016	122	9	12	21	149	—	—	—	—	—	
Manderville, Kent	Canada	C	1997–2000	214	10	19	29	81	6	0	0	0	2	
Markov, Danny	Russia	D	2003–2004	44	4	10	14	37	—	—	—	—	—	
Martinook, Jordan*^{†}	Canada	LW	2018–2026	550	81	116	197	257	95	10	28	38	58	SC 2026
Martins, Steve	Canada	C	1997–1998	3	0	0	0	0	—	—	—	—	—	
Matsumoto, Jon	Canada	C	2010–2011	13	2	0	2	4	—	—	—	—	—	
McBain, Jamie	United States	D	2009–2013	206	19	56	75	48	—	—	—	—	—	
McCarthy, Sandy	Canada	RW	1999–2000	13	0	0	0	9	—	—	—	—	—	
McClement, Jay	Canada	RW	2014–2017	224	15	25	40	59	—	—	—	—	—	
McCormick, Max	United States	LW	2020–2021	12	2	1	3	9	—	—	—	—	—	
McGinn, Brock	Canada	LW	2015–2021	345	51	55	106	81	34	6	6	12	12	
McKegg, Greg	Canada	C	2018–2019	41	6	5	11	8	14	2	0	2	4	
McKeown, Roland	Canada	D	2017–2018	10	0	3	3	19	—	—	—	—	—	
Melichar, Josef	Czech Republic	D	2008–2009	15	0	4	4	8	—	—	—	—	—	
Miller, K'Andre*^{†}	United States	D	2025–2026	72	8	29	37	56	19	0	9	9	10	SC 2026
Mormina, Joey	Canada	D	2007–2008	1	0	0	0	0	—	—	—	—	—	
Morrow, Scott	United States	D	2023–2025	16	1	5	6	0	5	0	0	0	2	
Murphy, Ryan	Canada	D	2012–2017	151	6	31	37	38	—	—	—	—	—	
Murray, Chris	Canada	RW	1997–1998	7	0	1	1	22	—	—	—	—	—	
Murray, Marty	Canada	C	2003–2004	66	5	7	12	8	—	—	—	—	—	
Nadeau, Bradly*	Canada	LW	2023–2026	15	3	1	4	2	—	—	—	—	—	
Nakladal, Jakub	Czech Republic	D	2016–2017	3	0	0	0	0	—	—	—	—	—	
Nash, Riley	Canada	C	2011–2016	242	31	50	81	69	—	—	—	—	—	
Necas, Martin	Czech Republic	C	2017–2025	411	113	185	298	148	59	11	19	30	2	
Nestrasil, Andrej	Czech Republic	RW	2014–2017	115	17	29	46	14	—	—	—	—	—	
Niederreiter, Nino	Switzerland	RW	2018–2022	234	69	68	137	125	43	7	5	12	32	
Nikishin, Alexander*^{†}	Russia	D	2024–2026	81	11	22	33	33	21	0	2	2	8	SC 2026
Nodl, Andreas	Austria	RW	2011–2013	56	3	5	8	8	—	—	—	—	—	
Noesen, Stefan	United States	RW	2021–2024	161	27	46	73	65	26	8	4	12	32	
Nolan, Brandon	Canada	C	2007–2008	6	0	1	1	0	—	—	—	—	—	
Nordgren, Niklas	Sweden	LW	2005–2006	43	4	2	6	30	—	—	—	—	—	
Nordstrom, Joakim	Sweden	C	2015–2018	228	19	24	43	35	—	—	—	—	—	
Nystrom, Joel*	Sweden	D	2025–2026	38	1	9	10	6	—	—	—	—	—	
O'Neill, Jeff	Canada	C	1997–2004	536	176	183	359	472	34	9	8	17	37	
Orlov, Dmitry	Russia	D	2023–2025	158	12	42	54	60	26	2	8	10	24	
Osala, Oskar	Finland	LW	2009–2010	1	0	0	0	0	—	—	—	—	—	
O'Sullivan, Patrick	Canada	C	2010–2011	10	1	0	1	2	—	—	—	—	—	
Ozolinsh, Sandis	Latvia	D	2000–2002	118	16	51	67	105	6	0	2	2	5	
Pacioretty, Max	United States	LW	2022–2023	5	3	0	3	2	—	—	—	—	—	
Palushaj, Aaron	United States	RW	2013–2014	2	0	0	0	0	—	—	—	—	—	
Paquette, Cedric	Canada	C	2020–2021	38	3	4	7	17	4	0	1	1	2	
Pellerin, Scott	Canada	LW	2000–2001	19	0	5	5	6	6	0	0	0	4	
Pesce, Brett	United States	D	2015–2024	627	39	159	198	227	57	5	16	21	22	
Petruzalek, Jakub	Czech Republic	C	2008–2009	2	0	1	1	0	—	—	—	—	—	
Philp, Noah*	Canada	F	2025–2026	2	0	0	0	0	—	—	—	—	—	
Picard, Alexandre	Canada	D	2009–2010	9	0	0	0	6	—	—	—	—	—	
Pitkanen, Joni	Finland	D	2008–2013	266	24	116	140	218	18	0	8	8	16	
Ponikarovsky, Alexei	Ukraine	LW	2011–2012	49	7	8	15	26	—	—	—	—	—	
Ponomarev, Vasili	Russia	C	2023–2024	2	1	1	2	0	—	—	—	—	—	
Pothier, Brian	United States	D	2009–2010	20	1	3	4	11	—	—	—	—	—	
Poturalski, Andrew	United States	C	2016–2017; 2021–2022	4	0	2	2	0	—	—	—	—	—	
Pratt, Nolan	Canada	D	1997–2000	148	4	17	21	229	3	0	0	0	2	
Primeau, Keith	Canada	C	1997–1999	159	56	69	125	185	6	0	3	3	6	
Puljujarvi, Jesse	Finland	RW	2022–2023	17	0	2	2	2	7	0	1	1	0	
Ranheim, Paul	United States	LW	1997–2000	230	23	32	55	73	6	0	0	0	2	
Rantanen, Mikko	Finland	RW	2024–2025	13	2	4	6	10	—	—	—	—	—	
Rask, Victor	Sweden	C	2014–2019	339	63	100	163	72	—	—	—	—	—	
Rattie, Ty	Canada	RW	2016–2017	5	0	2	2	0	—	—	—	—	—	
Recchi, Mark^{†}	Canada	RW	2005–2006	20	4	3	7	12	25	7	9	16	18	SC 2006
Reilly, Mike*^{†}	United States	D	2025–2026	42	1	8	9	26	2	0	2	2	2	SC 2026
Rempal, Sheldon	Canada	RW	2020–2021	3	0	0	0	0	—	—	—	—	—	
Rice, Steven	Canada	RW	1997–1998	47	2	4	6	38	—	—	—	—	—	
Richmond, Danny	United States	D	2005–2006	10	0	1	1	7	—	—	—	—	—	
Rissanen, Rasmus	Finland	D	2014–2016	6	0	0	0	4	—	—	—	—	—	
Ritchie, Byron	Canada	C	1998–2000; 2001–2002	33	0	2	2	19	—	—	—	—	—	
Roberts, Gary	Canada	LW	1997–2000	207	57	87	144	343	6	1	1	2	8	
Robidas, Justin*	United States	C	2024–2026	4	1	2	3	0	—	—	—	—	—	
Robinson, Eric*^{†}	United States	LW	2024–2026	149	26	24	50	18	34	4	7	11	18	SC 2026
Rodney, Bryan	Canada	D	2008–2011	30	1	12	13	8	—	—	—	—	—	
Rourke, Allan	Canada	D	2003–2004	25	1	2	3	22	—	—	—	—	—	
Roslovic, Jack	United States	C	2024–2025	81	22	17	39	10	9	1	3	4	0	
Roy, Nicolas	Canada	C	2017–2019	7	0	0	0	2	—	—	—	—	—	
Rucinski, Mike	United States	D	1997–1999; 2000–2001	40	0	2	2	10	—	—	—	—	—	
Ruutu, Tuomo	Finland	C	2007–2014	378	90	126	216	291	16	1	3	4	8	
Ryan, Derek	United States	C	2015–2018	153	28	41	69	52	—	—	—	—	—	
Ryan, Joakim	United States	D	2020–2021	4	0	0	0	0	—	—	—	—	—	
Ryan, Michael	United States	C	2008–2009	18	0	2	2	2	—	—	—	—	—	
Samson, Jerome	Canada	RW	2009–2012	46	2	7	9	18	—	—	—	—	—	
Samsonov, Sergei	Russia	LW	2007–2011	249	54	81	135	82	17	5	3	8	6	
Sanderson, Geoff	Canada	LW	1997–1998	40	7	10	17	14	—	—	—	—	—	
Sanguinetti, Bobby	United States	D	2011–2013	40	2	4	6	4	—	—	—	—	—	
Seeley, Ronan*	Canada	D	2025–2026	1	0	0	0	0	—	—	—	—	—	
Sekera, Andrej	Slovakia	D	2013–2015	131	13	50	63	28	—	—	—	—	—	
Seidenberg, Dennis	Germany	D	2006–2009	137	6	45	51	57	16	1	5	6	16	
Semin, Alexander	Russia	RW	2012–2015	166	41	64	105	120	—	—	—	—	—	
Sheppard, Ray	Canada	RW	1997–1999	84	29	35	64	18	6	5	1	6	2	
Shore, Drew	United States	C	2020–2021	4	0	0	0	2	—	—	—	—	—	
Skjei, Brady	United States	D	2019–2024	302	43	92	135	162	59	3	15	18	38	
Skinner, Jeff	Canada	C	2010–2018	579	204	175	379	268	—	—	—	—	—	
Shugg, Justin	Canada	LW	2014–2016	3	0	0	0	2	—	—	—	—	—	
Slavin, Jaccob*^{†}	United States	D	2015–2026	784	56	251	307	98	105	9	36	45	10	SC 2026
Slavin, Josiah*	United States	LW	2025–2026	2	0	0	0	2	—	—	—	—	—	
Smith, Brendan	Canada	D	2021–2022	45	4	4	8	36	14	1	3	4	12	
Smith, C. J.	United States	LW	2021–2022	1	0	0	0	0	—	—	—	—	—	
Smith, Ty	Canada	D	2024–2025	8	1	1	2	4	—	—	—	—	—	
Spacek, Jaroslav	Czech Republic	D	2011–2012	34	5	7	12	6	—	—	—	—	—	
St. Jacques, Bruno	Canada	D	2002–2004	53	2	7	9	43	—	—	—	—	—	
Staal, Eric^{†}	Canada	C	2003–2016	909	322	453	775	678	43	19	24	43	12	SC 2006
Staal, Jared	Canada	RW	2012–2014	2	0	0	0	2	—	—	—	—	—	
Staal, Jordan*^{†}	Canada	C	2012–2026	972	198	301	499	413	108	23	26	49	51	SC 2026
Stalberg, Viktor	Sweden	RW	2016–2017	75	11	5	16	41	—	—	—	—	—	
Stankoven, Logan*^{†}	Canada	C	2024–2026	100	26	27	53	37	34	16	8	24	10	SC 2026
Stastny, Paul	United States	C	2022–2023	73	9	13	22	16	15	4	0	4	4	
Stempniak, Lee	United States	RW	2016–2018	119	19	30	49	36	—	—	—	—	—	
Stepan, Derek	United States	C	2021–2023	131	14	16	30	22	14	0	1	1	2	
Stewart, Anthony	Canada	RW	2011–2012	77	9	11	20	30	—	—	—	—	—	
Stillman, Cory^{†}	Canada	C	2005–2008; 2010–2011	170	47	102	149	70	25	9	17	26	14	SC 2006
Stillman, Riley	Canada	D	2024–2025	5	0	0	0	7	—	—	—	—	—	
Surma, Damian	United States	LW	2002–2004	2	1	1	2	0	—	—	—	—	—	
Sutter, Brandon	United States	C	2008–2012	286	53	54	107	64	—	—	—	—	—	
Sutter, Brett	Canada	LW	2010–2014	36	1	4	5	24	—	—	—	—	—	
Sutter, Brody	Canada	C	2014–2016	12	0	0	0	0	—	—	—	—	—	
Suzuki, Ryan	Canada	C	2024–2025	2	0	0	0	0	—	—	—	—	—	
Svechnikov, Andrei*^{†}	Russia	RW	2018–2026	557	182	252	434	493	85	29	30	59	107	SC 2026
Svoboda, Jaroslav	Czech Republic	LW	2001–2004	91	8	14	22	40	23	1	4	5	28	
Tanabe, David	United States	D	1999–2003; 2006–2008	329	21	61	82	167	7	2	1	3	12	
Tennyson, Matt	United States	D	2016–2017	45	0	6	6	6	—	—	—	—	—	
Teravainen, Teuvo	Finland	C	2016–2024	555	138	277	415	104	65	19	20	39	22	
Terry, Chris	Canada	LW	2012–2016	138	20	14	34	30	—	—	—	—	—	
Tetarenko, Joey	Canada	RW	2003–2004	2	0	0	0	0	—	—	—	—	—	
Tolchinsky, Sergey	Russia	LW	2015–2017	4	0	2	2	0	—	—	—	—	—	
Tlusty, Jiri	Czech Republic	LW	2009–2015	322	76	69	145	102	—	—	—	—	—	
Trocheck, Vincent	United States	C	2019–2022	135	39	57	96	114	31	8	7	15	18	
Tselios, Nikos	United States	D	2001–2002	2	0	0	0	6	—	—	—	—	—	
Tverdovsky, Oleg^{†}	Russia	D	2005–2006	72	3	20	23	37	5	0	0	0	0	SC 2006
Unger Sorum, Felix*	Norway	RW	2025–2026	1	0	1	1	0	—	—	—	—	—	
Vasicek, Josef^{†}	Czech Republic	C	2000–2006; 2006–2007	341	57	78	135	229	37	5	2	7	14	SC 2006
Vatanen, Sami	Finland	D	2019–2020	—	—	—	—	—	7	0	3	3	6	
Versteeg, Kris	Canada	LW	2015–2016	63	11	22	33	36	—	—	—	—	—	
Van Riemsdyk, Trevor	United States	D	2017–2020	206	7	31	38	40	11	0	1	1	6	
Vrbata, Radim	Czech Republic	RW	2002–2006	106	19	16	35	32	—	—	—	—	—	
Walker, Scott	Canada	RW	2006–2010	213	43	60	103	222	18	1	6	7	19	
Walker, Sean*^{†}	Canada	D	2024–2026	163	14	33	47	105	31	1	5	6	18	SC 2026
Wallace, Tim	United States	RW	2012–2013	28	1	1	2	17	—	—	—	—	—	
Wallin, Niclas^{†}	Sweden	D	2000–2010	517	18	51	69	391	69	3	5	8	32	SC 2006
Wallmark, Lucas	Sweden	C	2016–2020	160	22	32	54	58	15	1	4	5	6	
Ward, Aaron^{†}	Canada	D	2001–2006; 2009–2010	336	16	51	67	317	48	3	4	7	40	SC 2006
Watt, Mike	Canada	LW	2002–2003	5	0	0	0	0	—	—	—	—	—	
Weight, Doug^{†}	United States	C	2005–2006	23	4	9	13	25	23	3	13	16	20	SC 2006
Welsh, Jeremy	Canada	LW	2011–2013	6	0	1	1	4	—	—	—	—	—	
Wesley, Glen^{†}	Canada	D	1997–2003; 2003–2008	729	35	120	155	442	59	0	5	5	30	Ret — #2 Retired; SC 2006
Westgarth, Kevin	Canada	RW	2012–2014	43	2	2	4	45	—	—	—	—	—	
Westlund, Tommy	Sweden	LW	1999–2003	203	9	13	22	48	25	1	0	1	17	
White, Ian	Canada	D	2010–2011	39	0	10	10	12	—	—	—	—	—	
Whitney, Ray^{†}	Canada	LW	2005–2010	372	119	215	334	176	42	12	14	26	18	SC 2006
Williams, Justin^{†}	Canada	RW	2003–2009; 2017–2020	449	128	188	316	323	47	12	14	26	61	SC 2006
Willis, Shane	Canada	RW	1998–2002	141	27	34	61	69	2	0	0	0	0	
Wisniewski, James	United States	D	2015–2016	1	0	0	0	0	—	—	—	—	—	
Woods, Brendan	Canada	LW	2014–2017	7	0	0	0	7	—	—	—	—	—	
Yelle, Stephane	Canada	C	2009–2010	59	4	3	7	28	—	—	—	—	—	
Zigomanis, Mike	Canada	C	2002–2006	57	3	4	7	6	—	—	—	—	—	
Zykov, Valentin	Russia	LW	2016–2019	25	4	7	11	2	—	—	—	—	—	

== See also ==
- List of NHL players
