= 2000 ECAC Hockey men's ice hockey tournament =

2000 ECAC Men's ice hockey tournament
- Dates: March 10–18, 2000
- Teams: 10
- Finals site: Olympic Arena; Lake Placid, New York
- Champions: St. Lawrence (5th title)
- Winning coach: Joe Marsh (4th title)
- MVP: Derek Gustafson (St. Lawrence)
- ECAC Men's Ice Hockey Tournaments

The 2000 ECAC Hockey Men's Ice Hockey Tournament was the 39th tournament in league history. It was played between March 10 and March 18, 2000. Quarterfinal games were played at home team campus sites, while the final five games were played at the Olympic Arena (subsequently renamed Herb Brooks Arena) in Lake Placid, New York. By winning the tournament, St. Lawrence received the ECAC's automatic bid to the 2000 NCAA Division I Men's Ice Hockey Tournament.

== Format ==
The tournament featured three rounds of play. The two teams that finish below tenth place in the standings are not eligible for tournament play. In the first round, the first and tenth seeds, the second and ninth seeds, the third seed and eighth seeds, the fourth seed and seventh seeds and the fifth seed and sixth seeds played a best-of-three series with the three highest-seeded winners advancing to the semifinals and the remaining two winners playing in the Four vs. Five matchup. After the opening round every series becomes a single-elimination game. In the semifinals, the highest seed plays the winner of the four vs. five game while the two remaining teams play with the winners advancing to the championship game and the losers advancing to the third place game. The tournament champion receives an automatic bid to the 2000 NCAA Men's Division I Ice Hockey Tournament.

== Conference standings ==
Note: GP = Games played; W = Wins; L = Losses; T = Ties; PTS = Points; GF = Goals For; GA = Goals Against

1999–00 ECAC Hockey standings
	Conference							Overall					
	GP	W	L	T	PTS	GF	GA	GP	W	L	T	GF	GA
#4 St. Lawrence†*	20	16	3	1	33	76	47	37	27	8	2	130	94
#9 Colgate	20	14	4	2	30	85	61	35	24	9	2	132	93
#13 Rensselaer	21	11	9	1	23	61	49	37	22	13	2	123	85
Cornell	20	10	9	1	21	70	54	32	16	14	2	104	86
Clarkson	20	9	8	3	21	69	71	35	17	15	3	111	116
Princeton	21	8	9	4	20	66	66	30	10	16	4	84	97
Harvard	21	9	10	2	20	65	63	30	11	17	2	85	95
Dartmouth	21	8	10	3	19	54	63	30	9	17	4	71	98
Yale	21	6	11	4	16	45	63	30	9	16	5	68	85
Union	21	6	14	1	13	48	75	33	8	24	1	79	127
Brown	21	4	15	2	10	52	78	28	6	19	3	66	98
Vermont^	7	3	2	2	8	25	26	17	5	9	3	53	75
Championship: St. Lawrence † indicates conference regular season champion * indicates conference tournament champion (Whitelaw Cup)^ Vermont was ineligible for the postseason Final rankings: USA Today/American Hockey Magazine Poll Top 15 Poll

== Bracket ==
Teams are reseeded after the First Round

First Round; March 10–11
1	St. Lawrence	8	4*	—
10	Union	4	3	—
2	Colgate	5*	4	—
9	Yale	4	2	—
3	Rensselaer	7	3*	—
8	Dartmouth	2	2	—
4	Cornell	4	4	—
7	Harvard	3	3	—
5	Clarkson	3	2	—
6	Princeton	2	1	—

Four vs. Five; March 16
4	Cornell	4
5	Clarkson	2

Semifinals; March 17
1	St. Lawrence	3*
4	Cornell	2
2	Colgate	1
3	Rensselaer	3

Championship; March 18
1	St. Lawrence	2
3	Rensselaer	0

Note: * denotes overtime period(s)

=== First round ===
==== (1) St. Lawrence vs. (10) Union ====
March 10	St. Lawrence	8 – 4	Union	Appleton Arena
Brandon Dietrich - PP - 12:02; Mike Gellard - 16:59		First period	03:41 - PP - Ryan Campbell; 17:37 - PP - Drew Taylor
Mike Gellard - 06:59; Ray DiLauro - 11:04; Matt Desrosiers - GW PP - 12:26		Second period	06:59 - Ryan Campbell; 12:48 - Ryan Campbell
Jason Windle - 00:16; Al Fyfe - PP - 16:59; Jack O'Brien - 18:38		Third period	No scoring
Derek Gustafson ( 29 saves / 33 shots )		Goalie stats	Brandon Snee ( 38 saves / 46 shots )

March 11	St. Lawrence	4 – 3	OT	Union	Appleton Arena
Erik Anderson - PP - 14:31		First period		No scoring
Jason Windle - 05:03		Second period		06:13 - PP - Clark Jones; 06:34 - Bryan Yackel; 12:34 - PP - Clark Jones
Mike Gellard - EA - 19:50		Third period		No scoring
Jason Windle - GW - 05:42		First overtime period		No scoring
Derek Gustafson ( 32 saves / 35 shots )		Goalie stats		Brandon Snee ( 56 saves / 60 shots )

St. Lawrence won series 2–0

==== (2) Colgate vs. (9) Yale ====
March 10	Colgate	5 – 4	OT	Yale	Starr Rink
No Scoring		First period		18:44 - PP - Lee Jelenic
Darryl Campbell - PP - 16:22; Andy McDonald - PP - 17:59		Second period		00:58 - Jeff Brow; 12:50 - Keith Fitzpatrick
Sean Nolan - 03:39; Sean Nolan - PP - 13:35		Third period		00:35 - PP - Jeff Brow
Sean Nolan - GW - 00:53		First overtime period		No scoring
Shep Harder ( 20 saves / 24 shots )		Goalie stats		Dan Lombard ( 37 saves / 42 shots )

March 11	Colgate	4 – 2	Yale	Starr Rink
Darryl Campbell - PP - 02:39		First period	No scoring
Cory Murphy - 07:25		Second period	08:43 - PP - Jeff Brow
Andy McDonald - GW - 12:51; Andy McDonald - EN - 19:11		Third period	01:43 - SH - Cory Shea
Shep Harder ( 23 saves / 25 shots )		Goalie stats	Dan Lombard ( 20 saves / 23 shots )

Colgate won series 2–0

==== (3) Rensselaer vs. (8) Dartmouth ====
March 10	Rensselaer	7 – 2	Dartmouth	Houston Field House
Andrew McPherson - 04:33; Brian Pothier - PP - 13:39		First period	No scoring
Marc Cavosie - GW - 04:33; Keith Dupee - 17:01		Second period	No scoring
Matt Murley - 01:19; Jim Henkel - 10:50; Doug Shepherd - 12:51		Third period	05:16 - Frank Nardella; 14:24 - Dan Casella
Joel Laing ( 33 saves / 35 shots )		Goalie stats	Nick Boucher ( 17 saves / 24 shots ) / Eric Almon ( 2 saves / 2 shots )

March 11	Rensselaer	3 – 2	OT	Dartmouth	Houston Field House
No Scoring		First period		No scoring
Brad Tapper - PP - 13:07		Second period		No scoring
Pete Gardiner - EA - 19:54		Third period		08:49 - Craig Lund; 10:33 - Pete Summerfelt
Pete Gardiner - GW - 10:37		First overtime period		No scoring
Joel Laing ( 37 saves / 39 shots )		Goalie stats		Nick Boucher ( 31 saves / 34 shots )

Rensselaer won series 2–0

==== (4) Cornell vs. (7) Harvard ====
March 10	Cornell	4 – 3	Harvard	Lynah Rink
Stephen Bâby - 10:33; Danny Powell - 13:21; Mike Rutter - 17:13		First period	08:03 - PP - Steve Moore; 15:44 - Pete Capouch
Doug Stienstra - GW - 19:08		Second period	10:31 - PP - Scott Turco
No scoring		Third period	No scoring
Ian Burt ( 20 saves / 23 shots )		Goalie stats	J.R Prestifilippo ( 31 saves / 35 shots )

March 11	Cornell	4 – 3	Harvard	Lynah Rink
No Scoring		First period	05:26 - SH - Jeff Stonehouse
Doug Stienstra - PP - 11:38; Rick Sacchetti - 17:54		Second period	17:32 - Brett Nowak
Denis Ladouceur - 06:29; Krzysztof Wieckowski - GW - 06:54		Third period	04:41 - Chris Bala
Ian Burt ( 23 saves / 26 shots )		Goalie stats	J.R Prestifilippo ( 20 saves / 24 shots )

Cornell won series 2–0

==== (5) Clarkson vs. (6) Princeton ====
March 10	Clarkson	3 – 2	Princeton	Cheel Arena
No Scoring		First period	01:45 - David Bennett; 16:26 - PP - Shane Campbell
Murray Kuntz - PP - 12:35; Erik Cole - 16:40		Second period	No scoring
Matt Poapst - GW - 01:02		Third period	No scoring
Karl Mattson ( 24 saves / 26 shots )		Goalie stats	Dave Stathos ( 26 saves / 29 shots )

March 11	Clarkson	2 – 1	Princeton	Cheel Arena
No Scoring		First period	No scoring
Erik Cole - PP - 08:06; David Evans - GW - 17:20		Second period	03:05 - Chris Corrinet
No scoring		Third period	No scoring
Karl Mattson ( 19 saves / 20 shots )		Goalie stats	Dave Stathos ( 35 saves / 37 shots )

Clarkson won series 2–0

=== Four vs. Five ===
==== (4) Cornell vs. (5) Clarkson ====
March 16	Cornell	4 – 2	Clarkson	Olympic Arena
Murray Kuntz - PP - 08:18		First period	19:34 - Daniel Svoboda
Andrew McNiven - 04:09; Stephen Bâby - GW - 04:37; Mark McRae - 19:53		Second period	No scoring
No scoring		Third period	06:36 - Adam Campana
Ian Burt ( 38 saves / 40 shots )		Goalie stats	Karl Mattson ( 13 saves / 16 shots ) / Shawn Grant ( 9 saves / 10 shots )

=== Semifinals ===
==== (1) St. Lawrence vs. (4) Cornell ====
March 17	St. Lawrence	3 – 2	OT	Cornell	Olympic Arena
Brandon Dietrich - 13:58		First period		No scoring
Jack O'Brien - 13:41		Second period		19:58 - PP - Douglas Murray
No scoring		Third period		05:23 - Frank Kovac
Brandon Dietrich - GW - 14:51		First overtime period		No scoring
Derek Gustafson ( 25 saves / 27 shots )		Goalie stats		Ian Burt ( 40 saves / 43 shots )

==== (2) Colgate vs. (3) Rensselaer ====
March 17	Colgate	1 – 3	Rensselaer	Olympic Arena
Chad MacDonald - 17:15		First period	No scoring
No scoring		Second period	06:47 - PP - Keith Dupee; 06:47 - GW - Nolan Graham
No scoring		Third period	18:53 - Keith Dupee
Shep Harder ( 38 saves / 41 shots )		Goalie stats	Joel Laing ( 19 saves / 20 shots )

=== Third place ===
==== (2) Colgate vs. (4) Cornell ====
March 18	Colgate	4 – 0	Cornell	Olympic Arena
Sean Nolan - GW - 14:48; Andy McDonald - 15:52		First period	No scoring
Sean Nolan - PP - 13:50		Second period	No scoring
Darryl Campbell - PP - 10:16		Third period	No scoring
Shep Harder ( 33 saves / 33 shots )		Goalie stats	Chris Gartman ( 23 saves / 27 shots )

=== Championship ===
==== (1) St. Lawrence vs. (3) Rensselaer ====
March 18	St. Lawrence	2 – 0	Rensselaer	Olympic Arena
Jason Windle - GW - 01:23		First period	No scoring
Jason Windle - 01:53		Second period	No scoring
No scoring		Third period	No scoring
Derek Gustafson ( 30 saves / 30 shots )		Goalie stats	Joel Laing ( 33 saves / 35 shots )

== Tournament awards ==
=== All-Tournament Team ===
- F Keith Dupee (Rensselaer)
- F Brandon Dietrich (St. Lawrence)
- F Jason Windle (St. Lawrence)
- D Justin Harney (St. Lawrence)
- D Brian Pothier (Rensselaer)
- G Derek Gustafson* (St. Lawrence)

* Most Outstanding Player(s)
