= Derek Gustafson =

American ice hockey player (born 1979)

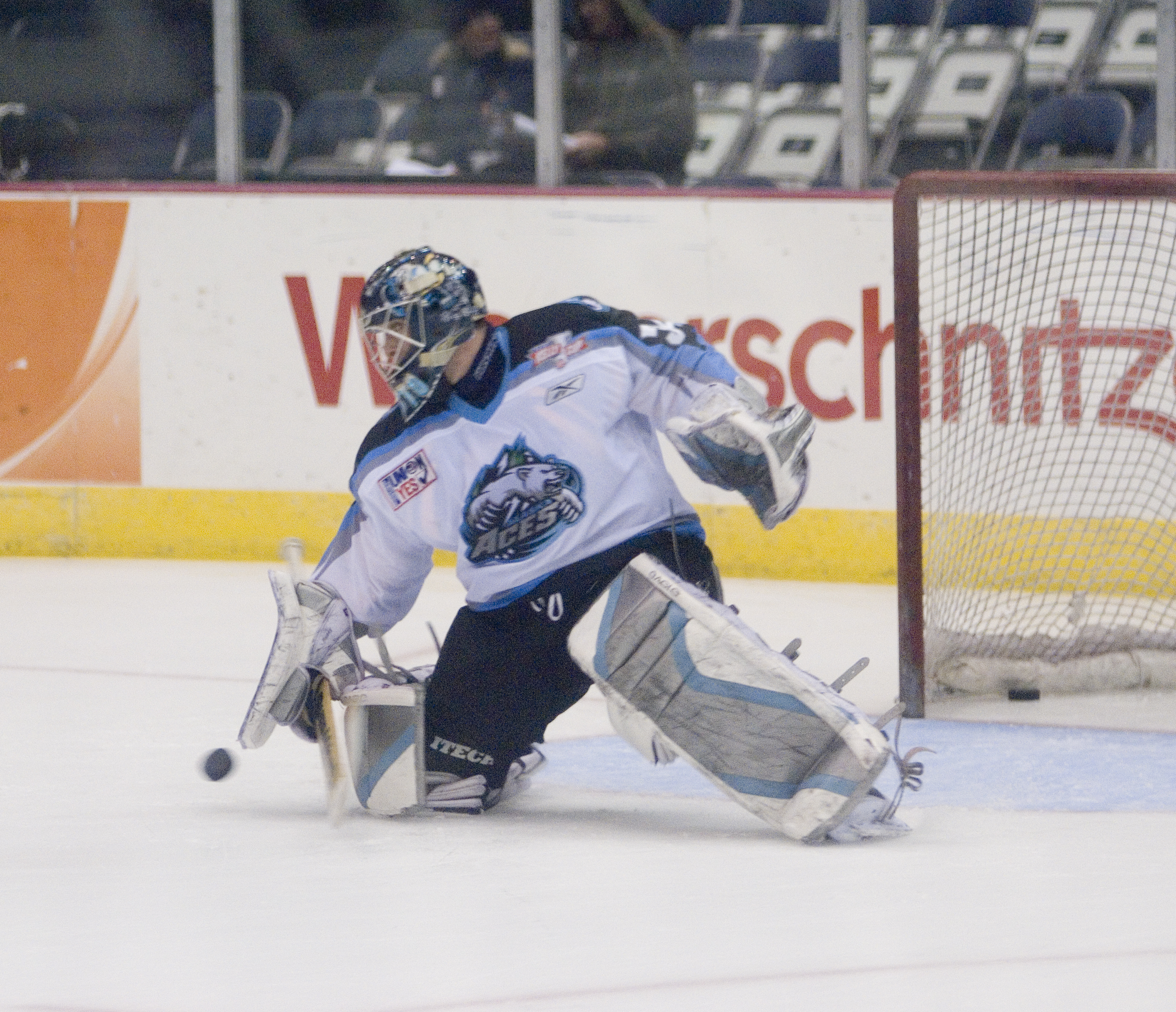
- Alaska Aces player Derek Gustafson warming up
- Born: June 21, 1979 (age 47) Gresham, Oregon, U.S.
- Height: 5 ft 11 in (180 cm)
- Weight: 185 lb (84 kg; 13 st 3 lb)
- Position: Goaltender
- Caught: Left
- Played for: Minnesota Wild
- NHL draft: Undrafted
- Playing career: 2000–2008

Derek Gustafson (born June 21, 1979) is an American former professional ice hockey goaltender. He played five games in the National Hockey League (NHL) between 2001 and 2002 for the Minnesota Wild. The rest of his career, which lasted from 2000 to 2008, was spent in different minor leagues.

== Playing career ==
Prior to beginning his professional career, Gustafson was a goaltender for the St. Lawrence University Skating Saints during the 1999-2000 season. This was the third best season in Skating Saints history, and, with Gustafson as the starting goaltender, the team finished at the top of the ECACHL regular season standings, won the ECACHL tournament, and advanced to the NCAA Division I semifinals after defeating Boston University 3-2 in quadruple overtime. This game is the longest game played in the history of the NCAA tournament and is the third longest Men's Division I game. Gustafson and BU netminder, Rick DiPietro both hold the record for most saves in a game.

== Career statistics ==
=== Regular season and playoffs ===
			Regular season										Playoffs
Season	Team	League	GP	W	L	T	OTL	MIN	GA	SO	GAA	SV%	GP	W	L	MIN	GA	SO	GAA	SV%
1996–97	Vernon Vipers	BCHL	23	16	4	0	—	1241	70	0	3.38	.904	—	—	—	—	—	—	—	—
1997–98	Vernon Vipers	BCHL	42	27	13	2	—	2270	144	1	3.81	—	6	2	1	257	13	0	3.04	—
1998–99	Vernon Vipers	BCHL	42	39	3	0	—	2505	94	3	2.25	.930	12	—	—	—	—	—	3.13	.914
1999–00	St. Lawrence University	ECAC	24	17	4	2	—	1475	51	2	2.07	.935	—	—	—	—	—	—	—	—
2000–01	Minnesota Wild	NHL	4	1	3	0	—	239	10	0	2.51	.897	—	—	—	—	—	—	—	—
2000–01	Jackson Bandits	ECHL	7	4	3	0	—	404	15	1	2.23	.930	—	—	—	—	—	—	—	—
2000–01	Cleveland Lumberjacks	IHL	24	14	7	1	—	1293	59	2	2.74	.906	2	0	1	53	5	0	5.64	.706
2001–02	Minnesota Wild	NHL	1	0	0	0	—	26	0	0	0.00	1.000	—	—	—	—	—	—	—	—
2001–02	Houston Aeros	AHL	38	14	13	6	—	2016	92	4	2.74	.904	2	0	0	25	1	0	2.37	.857
2002–03	Houston Aeros	AHL	41	23	14	2	—	2301	108	2	2.82	.891	—	—	—	—	—	—	—	—
2002–03	Louisiana IceGators	ECHL	2	1	1	0	—	118	8	0	4.07	.895	—	—	—	—	—	—	—	—
2003–04	Louisiana IceGators	ECHL	43	28	14	0	—	2499	87	5	2.09	.927	8	4	4	560	19	1	2.03	.941
2004–05	Adirondack Frostbite	UHL	57	32	18	6	—	3290	155	4	2.83	.899	3	0	3	222	9	0	2.43	.915
2005–06	Providence Bruins	AHL	10	5	3	—	2	578	22	1	2.28	.916	4	2	2	211	17	0	4.83	.840
2005–06	Adirondack Frostbite	UHL	34	22	7	—	4	1979	97	1	2.94	.901	—	—	—	—	—	—	—	—
2006–07	Alaska Aces	EcHL	43	29	11	—	3	2536	100	5	2.37	.918	15	9	6	890	35	2	2.36	.926
2007–08	Alaska Aces	EcHL	33	12	16	—	4	1899	117	1	3.70	.879	—	—	—	—	—	—	—	—
NHL totals			5	1	3	0	—	265	10	0	2.27	.904	—	—	—	—	—	—	—	—

== Awards and honors ==
Award	Year
All-ECAC Hockey Rookie Team	1999–00
All-ECAC Hockey Second Team	1999–00
ECAC Hockey All-Tournament Team	2000

Awards and achievements
Preceded by Brandon Dietrich	ECAC Hockey Rookie of the Year; 1999–00	Succeeded by Rob McFeeters
Preceded by Willie Mitchell	ECAC Hockey Most Outstanding Player in Tournament; 2000	Succeeded by Jeremy Symington
