= Brandon Dietrich =

Canadian ice hockey player

- Born: March 22, 1978 (age 48) Waterloo, Ontario, Canada
- Height: 6 ft 0 in (183 cm)
- Weight: 203 lb (92 kg; 14 st 7 lb)
- Position: Centre
- Shot: Right
- Played for: AHL; Hartford Wolf Pack; Manchester Monarchs; ECHL; Charlotte Checkers; Reading Royals; Gwinnett Gladiators; Germany2 / DEL; ESV Kaufbeuren; Landshut Cannibals; Eisbären Regensburg; EHC München; Eispiraten Crimmitschau; NLB; EHC Biel-Bienne; HC Thurgau; ACH; Brantford Blast
- NHL draft: Undrafted
- Playing career: 2000–2017

Brandon Dietrich (born March 22, 1978) is a Canadian former professional ice hockey player. He last played for the Brantford Blast in the Ontario Hockey Association's Allan Cup Hockey league (ACH) during the 2016-2017 season.

Prior to turning professional, Dietrich attended St. Lawrence University where he played two seasons of NCAA Division I men's ice hockey with the St. Lawrence Saints men's ice hockey team. For his outstanding play during the 1998–99 season he was named the ECAC Rookie of the Year.

== Career statistics ==
			Regular season					Playoffs
Season	Team	League	GP	G	A	Pts	PIM	GP	G	A	Pts	PIM
1998–99	St. Lawrence University	NCAA	39	20	19	39	22	—	—	—	—	—
1999–00	St. Lawrence University	NCAA	36	15	26	41	20	—	—	—	—	—
2000–01	Hartford Wolf Pack	AHL	44	3	8	11	11	—	—	—	—	—
2000–01	Charlotte Checkers	ECHL	20	2	9	11	19	5	5	1	6	6
2001–02	Hartford Wolf Pack	AHL	4	0	0	0	0	—	—	—	—	—
2001–02	Charlotte Checkers	ECHL	66	29	45	74	51	5	0	1	1	6
2002–03	Manchester Monarchs	AHL	28	3	8	11	15	—	—	—	—	—
2002–03	Reading Royals	ECHL	49	17	32	49	54	—	—	—	—	—
2003–04	Gwinnett Gladiators	ECHL	72	10	60	70	31	13	1	4	5	8
2004–05	ESV Kaufbeuren	Germany2	51	23	32	55	76	—	—	—	—	—
2005–06	Landshut Cannibals	Germany2	52	23	44	67	38	7	5	5	10	10
2006–07	EHC Biel-Bienne	NLB	25	10	23	33	10	—	—	—	—	—
2006–07	Eisbären Regensburg	Germany2	25	11	17	28	43	4	0	0	0	2
2007–08	Landshut Cannibals	Germany2	50	27	26	53	65	13	3	8	11	26
2008–09	EHC München	Germany2	39	15	28	43	16	13	4	8	12	8
2009–10	EHC München	Germany2	51	18	37	55	39	12	2	8	10	0
2010–11	EHC München	DEL	14	3	7	10	4	—	—	—	—	—
2011–12	EHC München	DEL	52	12	20	32	38	—	—	—	—	—
2012–13	HC Thurgau	NLB	36	6	22	28	30	—	—	—	—	—
2012–13	Eispiraten Crimmitschau	Germany2	17	7	11	18	6	—	—	—	—	—
2013–14	Brantford Blast	ACH	19	11	15	26	16	8	2	4	6	4
2014–15	Brantford Blast	ACH	5	0	6	6	2	1	0	0	0	0
2015–16	Brantford Blast	ACH	10	6	13	19	2	6	3	5	8	21
2016–17	Brantford Blast	ACH	1	0	0	0	0	—	—	—	—	—
AHL totals			76	6	16	22	26	—	—	—	—	—

== Awards and honours ==
Award	Year
All-ECAC Hockey Rookie Team	1998–99
All-ECAC Hockey First Team	1999–00
AHCA East Second-Team All-American	1999–00
ECAC Hockey All-Tournament Team	2000
ECHL First All-Star Team	2001–02

Awards and achievements
Preceded by Erik Cole / Willie Mitchell	ECAC Hockey Rookie of the Year; 1998–99	Succeeded by Derek Gustafson
