= Oskar Osala =

Finnish ice hockey player (born 1987)

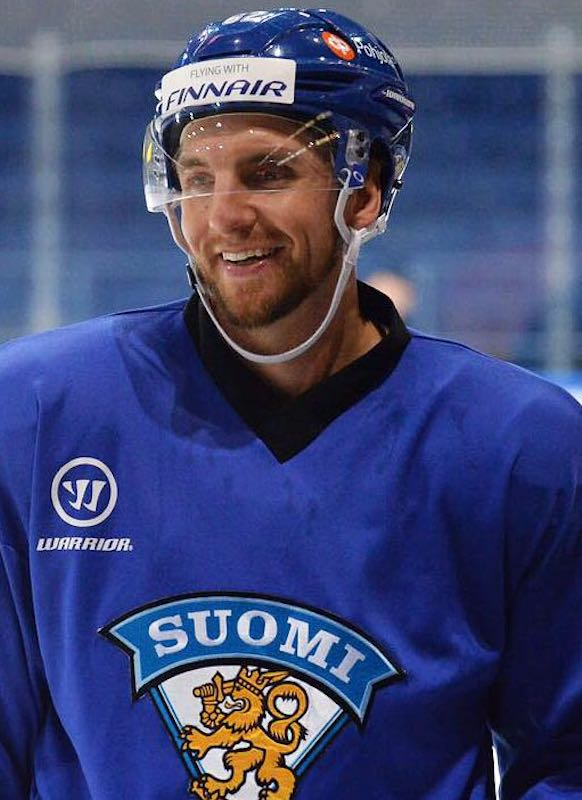
- Born: 26 December 1987 (age 38) Vaasa, Finland
- Height: 6 ft 4 in (193 cm)
- Weight: 243 lb (110 kg; 17 st 5 lb)
- Position: Left wing
- Shot: Left
- Played for: Espoo Blues; Washington Capitals; Carolina Hurricanes; Neftekhimik Nizhnekamsk; Metallurg Magnitogorsk; Oulun Kärpät
- National team: Finland
- NHL draft: 97th overall, 2006; Washington Capitals
- Playing career: 2004–2019

Oskar Osala (born 26 December 1987) is a Finnish former professional ice hockey player. He played in three National Hockey League (NHL) games with the Washington Capitals and Carolina Hurricanes and represented Finland in Olympic Winter Games 2018.

== Playing career ==
He started his career with Vaasa-based Sport. He made his North American debut with the OHL's Mississauga IceDogs in 2005, and was drafted 97th overall in the fourth round of the 2006 NHL entry draft by the Washington Capitals.

In the 2007–08 season, he returned to Finland where he played for the Espoo Blues of the SM-liiga; made his debut with the senior national team; and was named SM-liiga rookie of the year.

Osala signed a three-year contract with the Capitals in June 2008, and was assigned to Washington's AHL affiliate in Hershey. On 10 December 2008, Osala made his NHL debut replacing the injured Tomáš Fleischmann in the Caps' 3–1 win over the Boston Bruins, playing two games before being returned to the Bears. Osala finished the season with the Hershey Bears' Calder Cup winning team, scoring two goals in Game 1 of the Calder Cup Finals.

On 3 March 2010, Osala was traded with Brian Pothier to the Carolina Hurricanes for Joe Corvo. Osala made a brief NHL appearance with Carolina shortly after the trade, but spent most of the remainder of the season with the Albany River Rats.

Unable to find a role with the Hurricanes and subsequently assigned to AHL affiliate the Charlotte Checkers for the duration of the following season, Osala signed a one-year contract with Russian team Neftekhimik Nizhnekamsk of the Kontinental Hockey League (KHL) on 25 May 2011.

On 10 December 2013, during the 2013–14, his third with Neftekhimik, Osala was traded to division competitors Metallurg Magnitogorsk. He contributed 6 assists in the post-season to help Metallurg claim their first Gagarin Cup.

Osala played 5 seasons with Metallurg, which won a second Gagarin Cup in the 2015–16 campaign, before opting to leave the KHL following the 2017–18 season.

Citing a lack of drive, Osala sat out the beginning of the 2018–19 season as a free agent. On 12 November 2018, Osala opted to end his hiatus and agreed to a one-year contract for the remainder of the season in returning to his homeland with Oulun Kärpät of the top flight Liiga.

== International play ==
Osala shared the goal scoring title in 2007 IIHF World Junior Championships. Osala scored five goals in six games for Finland, sharing the lead with four other players.

== Career statistics ==
=== Regular season and playoffs ===
			Regular season					Playoffs
Season	Team	League	GP	G	A	Pts	PIM	GP	G	A	Pts	PIM
2003–04	Sport	FIN U18	16	10	11	21	10	—	—	—	—	—
2003–04	Sport	FIN.3 U20	2	0	0	0	4	—	—	—	—	—
2003–04	Sport	Mestis	5	0	0	0	0	—	—	—	—	—
2004–05	Sport	FIN U18	2	0	1	1	4	—	—	—	—	—
2004–05	Sport	FIN.2 U20	19	13	24	37	28	2	0	0	0	2
2004–05	Sport	Mestis	21	1	4	5	6	7	0	0	0	6
2005–06	Mississauga IceDogs	OHL	68	17	26	43	86	—	—	—	—	—
2006–07	Mississauga IceDogs	OHL	54	22	22	44	81	5	2	2	4	0
2007–08	Blues	SM-liiga	53	18	17	35	62	17	7	3	10	8
2008–09	Hershey Bears	AHL	75	23	14	37	47	22	6	4	10	17
2008–09	Washington Capitals	NHL	2	0	0	0	0	—	—	—	—	—
2009–10	Hershey Bears	AHL	53	15	14	29	57	—	—	—	—	—
2009–10	Albany River Rats	AHL	16	10	3	13	11	8	2	1	3	2
2009–10	Carolina Hurricanes	NHL	1	0	0	0	0	—	—	—	—	—
2010–11	Charlotte Checkers	AHL	59	13	29	42	55	15	3	2	5	29
2011–12	Neftekhimik Nizhnekamsk	KHL	41	12	7	19	44	—	—	—	—	—
2012–13	Neftekhimik Nizhnekamsk	KHL	44	14	10	24	52	4	0	1	1	17
2013–14	Neftekhimik Nizhnekamsk	KHL	33	5	12	17	20	—	—	—	—	—
2013–14	Metallurg Magnitogorsk	KHL	19	5	5	10	31	21	0	6	6	43
2014–15	Metallurg Magnitogorsk	KHL	55	11	5	16	85	10	1	2	3	4
2015–16	Metallurg Magnitogorsk	KHL	60	12	15	27	76	11	3	2	5	8
2016–17	Metallurg Magnitogorsk	KHL	60	14	14	28	53	18	6	1	7	29
2017–18	Metallurg Magnitogorsk	KHL	55	14	9	23	90	11	3	3	6	6
2018–19	Kärpät	Liiga	29	15	7	22	24	13	2	1	3	45
AHL totals			202	61	60	121	170	45	11	7	18	48
NHL totals			3	0	0	0	0	—	—	—	—	—
KHL totals			367	88	78	166	451	75	13	15	28	107

=== International ===
Year	Team	Event	Result	GP	G	A	Pts	PIM
2004	Finland	WHC17	6th	5	1	1	2	6
2005	Finland	WJC18	7th	6	0	0	0	27
2007	Finland	WJC	6th	6	5	3	8	4
2010	Finland	WC	6th	4	0	0	0	2
2017	Finland	WC	4th	10	1	2	3	14
2018	Finland	OG	6th	4	0	1	1	0
Junior totals				17	6	4	10	37
Senior totals				18	1	3	4	16

== Awards and honors ==
Award	Year
OHL
Second All-Rookie Team	2006
Liiga
Rookie of the Year	2008
AHL
Calder Cup (Hershey Bears)	2009
KHL
Gagarin Cup (Metallurg Magnitogorsk)	2014, 2016
