= Danny Powell =

Australian rules footballer

Personal information
- Full name: Daniel Andrew Powell
- Born: 29 May 1922; Carlton, Victoria
- Died: 27 January 2013 (aged 90)
- Original team: University Blues

Playing career^{1}
Years	Club	Games (Goals)
1942	Melbourne	7 (6)
- ^{1} Playing statistics correct to the end of 1942.

Daniel Andrew Powell (29 May 1922 – 27 January 2013) was an Australian rules footballer who played with Melbourne in the Victorian Football League (VFL).

Powell later served in both the Australian Army and the Royal Australian Air Force in World War II.
