= Brian Pothier =

American ice hockey player (born 1977)

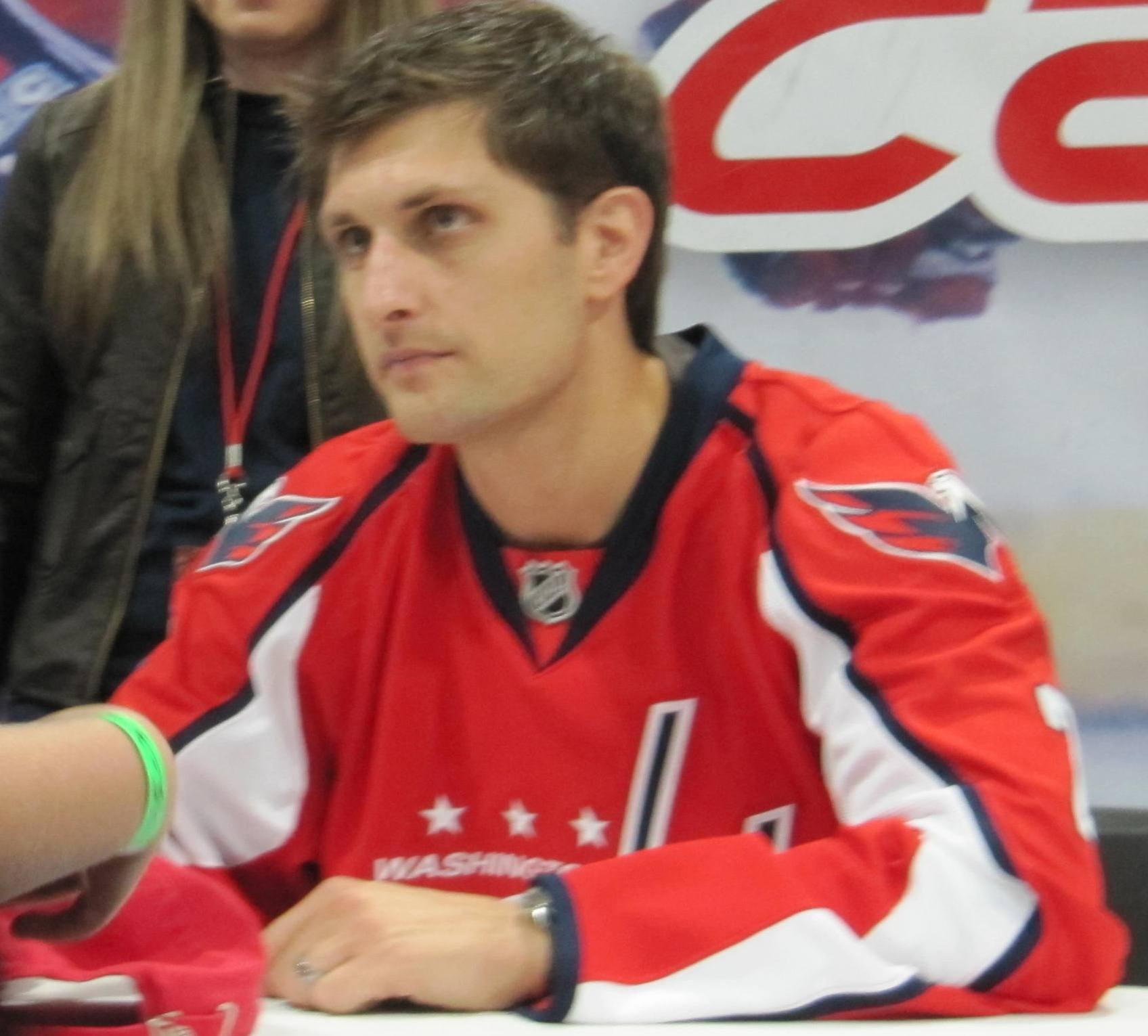
- Born: April 15, 1977 (age 48) New Bedford, Massachusetts, U.S.
- Height: 6 ft 0 in (183 cm)
- Weight: 204 lb (93 kg; 14 st 8 lb)
- Position: Defense
- Shot: Right
- Played for: Atlanta Thrashers; Ottawa Senators; Washington Capitals; Carolina Hurricanes; Genève-Servette HC
- National team: United States
- NHL draft: Undrafted
- Playing career: 2000–2014

Brian Pothier (born April 15, 1977) is an American former professional ice hockey defenseman. Pothier played in the National Hockey League (NHL) from 2000 until 2010.

== Playing career ==
As a youth, Pothier played in the 1991 Quebec International Pee-Wee Hockey Tournament with a minor ice hockey team from Beverly, Massachusetts.

Undrafted to the NHL, Pothier played collegiate hockey with Rensselaer Polytechnic Institute. After his senior year he was signed as a free agent by the Atlanta Thrashers on March 27, 2000. After two seasons with the Thrashers he was moved to the Ottawa Senators prior to the 2002–03 season in a trade for Shawn McEachern, and was later signed by the Washington Capitals as a free agent in the summer of 2006.

On January 3, 2008, Pothier suffered a concussion, possibly when Boston Bruins right winger Milan Lucic hit him hard into the boards, resulting in the fourth reported concussion of his career, which sidelined him for the next fourteen months. Pothier later attributed his post-concussion symptoms and long recovery period to an undiagnosed astigmatism resulting from his latest concussion. He stated that he had recovered from the concussion two to three months after the injury, but his astigmatism led to the symptoms previously thought to be post-concussion syndrome until it was properly diagnosed in December 2008.

On December 17, 2008, he practiced in full gear for the first time since the injury. On March 4, 2009, Pothier was assigned to the Capitals' American Hockey League affiliate, the Hershey Bears, for conditioning and to see if he experienced any post-concussion symptoms. Pothier was recalled to the Capitals, returning to the ice on March 16, 2009, fourteen months after the initial injury. He then scored his first goal since his injury on March 31, 2009, against the Tampa Bay Lightning.

On March 3, 2010, having registered 11 points in 41 games to that point in the 2009–10 season, Brian was traded along with prospect Oskar Osala to the Carolina Hurricanes in exchange for defenseman Joe Corvo.

On July 27, 2010, Pothier ended his North American career and signed a two-year contract with European team Genève-Servette HC of the Swiss National League A (NLA). After two seasons in Switzerland, Pothier signed a two-year contract extension to remain with Genève-Servette. However he was unable to take the ice, due to lingering concussion symptoms that ultimately ended his professional career.

While in his recovery and still of the intention to fulfill his contract obligation to Genève-Servette HC, Pothier served as a voluntary assistant coach with the University of Massachusetts at Dartmouth.

== Career statistics ==
=== Regular season and playoffs ===
			Regular season					Playoffs
Season	Team	League	GP	G	A	Pts	PIM	GP	G	A	Pts	PIM
1995–96	Northfield Mount Hermon School	HS–Prep	27	11	22	33	36	—	—	—	—	—
1996–97	RPI Engineers	ECAC	34	1	11	12	42	—	—	—	—	—
1997–98	RPI Engineers	ECAC	35	2	9	11	28	—	—	—	—	—
1998–99	RPI Engineers	ECAC	37	5	13	18	36	—	—	—	—	—
1999–2000	RPI Engineers	ECAC	36	9	24	33	44	—	—	—	—	—
2000–01	Atlanta Thrashers	NHL	3	0	0	0	2	—	—	—	—	—
2000–01	Orlando Solar Bears	IHL	76	12	29	41	69	16	3	5	8	11
2001–02	Atlanta Thrashers	NHL	33	3	6	9	22	—	—	—	—	—
2001–02	Chicago Wolves	AHL	39	6	13	19	30	—	—	—	—	—
2002–03	Ottawa Senators	NHL	14	2	4	6	6	1	0	0	0	2
2002–03	Binghamton Senators	AHL	68	7	40	47	58	8	2	8	10	4
2003–04	Ottawa Senators	NHL	55	2	6	8	24	7	0	0	0	6
2004–05	Binghamton Senators	AHL	77	12	36	48	64	6	0	1	1	6
2005–06	Ottawa Senators	NHL	77	5	30	35	59	8	2	1	3	2
2006–07	Washington Capitals	NHL	72	3	25	28	44	—	—	—	—	—
2007–08	Washington Capitals	NHL	38	5	9	14	20	—	—	—	—	—
2008–09	Washington Capitals	NHL	9	1	2	3	4	13	0	2	2	8
2008–09	Hershey Bears	AHL	4	0	0	0	2	—	—	—	—	—
2009–10	Washington Capitals	NHL	41	4	7	11	10	—	—	—	—	—
2009–10	Carolina Hurricanes	NHL	20	1	3	4	11	—	—	—	—	—
2010–11	Genève–Servette HC	NLA	44	8	25	33	26	6	2	4	6	10
2011–12	Genève–Servette HC	NLA	50	6	21	27	34	—	—	—	—	—
NHL totals			362	26	92	118	202	29	2	3	5	18
AHL totals			188	25	89	114	154	14	2	9	11	10

=== International ===
Year	Team	Event	Result	GP	G	A	Pts	PIM
2007	United States	WC	5th	7	0	1	1	4
Senior totals				7	0	1	1	4

== Awards and honors ==
Award	Year
College
All-ECAC Hockey Second Team	1999–00
AHCA East Second-Team All-American	1999–00
ECAC Hockey All-Tournament Team	2000

== Transactions ==
- March 27, 2000 – Signed as a free agent by the Atlanta Thrashers
- June 29, 2002 – Traded to the Ottawa Senators for Shawn McEachern and a sixth round selection in 2004.
- July 1, 2006 – Signed as a free agent by the Washington Capitals
- March 3, 2010 – Traded to the Carolina Hurricanes, along with Oskar Osala and second round selection in 2011 for Joe Corvo.
