= Joe Corvo =

American ice hockey player (born 1977)

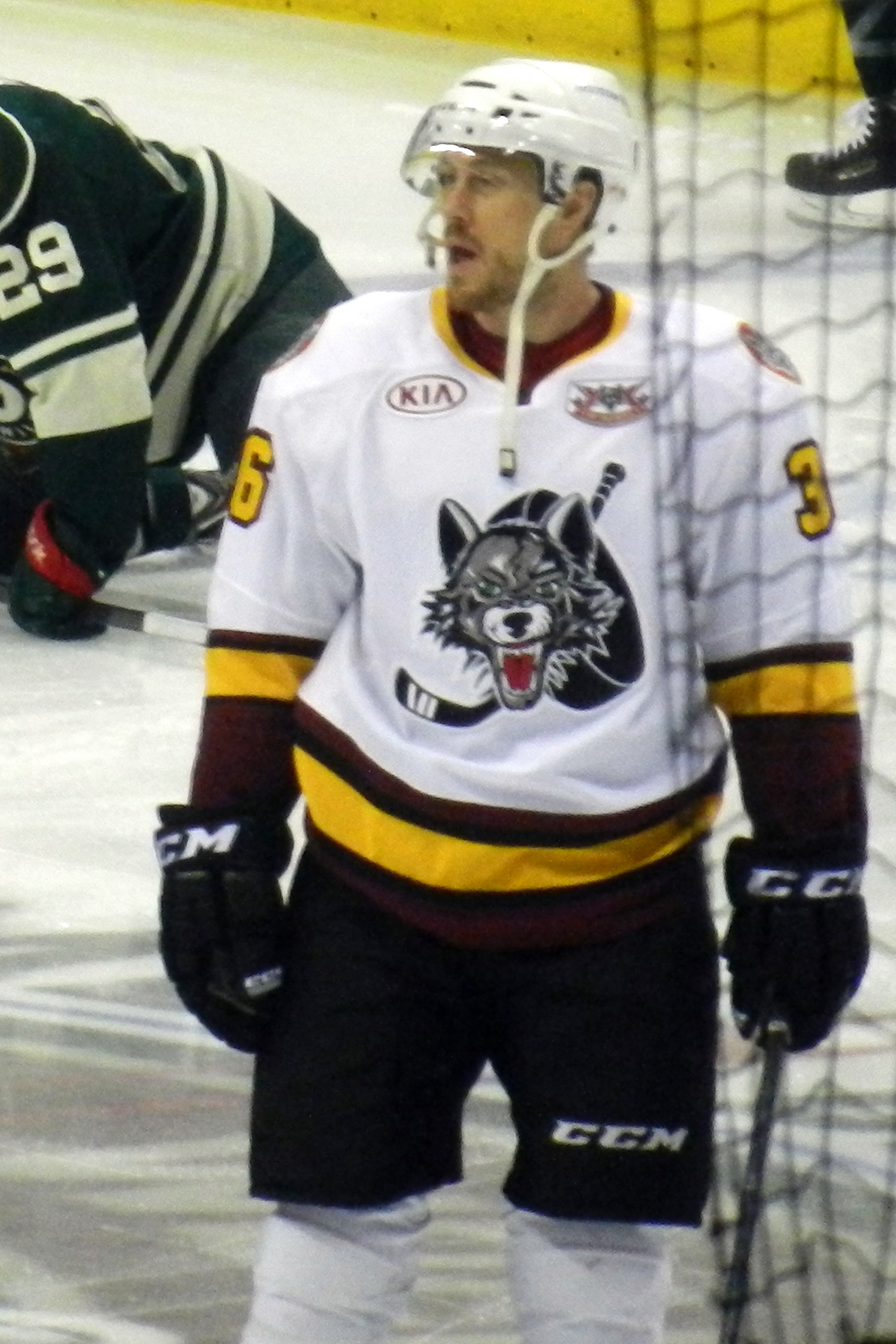
- Born: June 20, 1977 (age 48) Oak Park, Illinois, U.S.
- Height: 6 ft 1 in (185 cm)
- Weight: 205 lb (93 kg; 14 st 9 lb)
- Position: Defense
- Shot: Right
- Played for: Los Angeles Kings; Ottawa Senators; Carolina Hurricanes; Washington Capitals; Boston Bruins
- National team: United States
- NHL draft: 83rd overall, 1997; Los Angeles Kings
- Playing career: 1998–2014

Joseph Edward Corvo (born June 20, 1977) is an American former professional ice hockey player who played 11 seasons in the National Hockey League (NHL) for the Los Angeles Kings, Ottawa Senators, Carolina Hurricanes, Washington Capitals, and Boston Bruins.

== Playing career ==
=== Early career ===
In one of Corvo's first major ice hockey appearances, he participated in the 1997 World Junior Championships in Switzerland. Despite placing second to Canada in the medal round, he was named the top defenseman of the tournament. He then played for three seasons at Western Michigan University, from 1995 to 1998, where he was a teammate of future NHL player Jamal Mayers.

=== Professional career ===
==== Los Angeles Kings ====
He was drafted by the Los Angeles Kings in the fourth round of the 1997 NHL entry draft. He made his NHL debut in the 2002–03 season. He would play three seasons for the Kings. His best season with the Kings saw him score fourteen goals and 26 assists for 40 points in 2005–06.

==== Ottawa Senators ====
On July 1, 2006, Corvo signed as a four-year, unrestricted free agent contract with the Ottawa Senators worth $10.5 million. On October 26, 2006, he broke a Senators record for points for a defenseman in a game with one goal and four assists against the Toronto Maple Leafs. He was named the game's first star. That season, the Senators made it to the 2007 Stanley Cup Finals, losing to the Anaheim Ducks in five games.

==== Carolina Hurricanes ====
In a trade to prepare the Senators for the 2008 playoffs, the Senators traded Corvo along with Patrick Eaves to the Carolina Hurricanes for Mike Commodore and Cory Stillman in February 2008. On March 16, 2008, Corvo scored a hat trick against the Senators in his first game against his ex-team since the trade. After the game, Ottawa GM was quoted as saying he would never have traded Corvo "if he played like that with Ottawa." Corvo became only the third defenseman in Hartford Whalers-Carolina Hurricanes franchise history to record a hat trick. Between the Senators and Hurricanes, Corvo scored 13 goals and 35 assists totaling 48 points for the season.

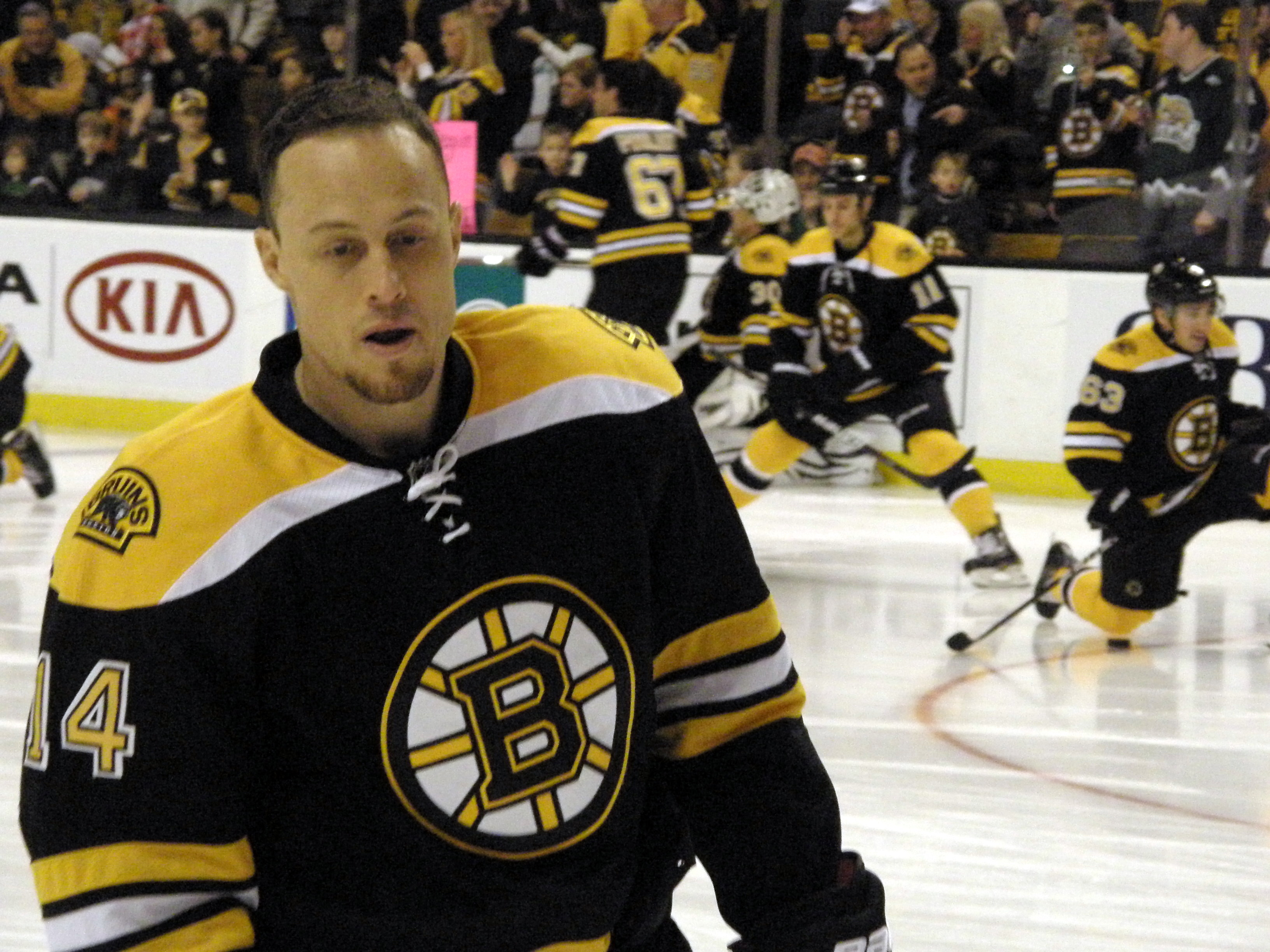
Corvo warming up with Boston during the 2011–12 season

==== Washington Capitals ====
Corvo would play for nearly two seasons with the Hurricanes until March 3, 2010, when he was traded to Washington at the deadline for Brian Pothier, Oskar Osala, and a second-round draft pick in the 2011 NHL entry draft. Corvo made his Capitals debut against the Tampa Bay Lightning the following day on March 4, and finished the season with two goals for six points in 18 games with the Capitals before suffering a first round elimination in the playoffs to the Montreal Canadiens.

==== Return to Carolina, Boston Bruins ====
Corvo returned to the Hurricanes as a free agent on July 7, 2010. Corvo signed a two-year contract to return to the Carolina Hurricanes worth $2.75 million a year. Corvo played most of two seasons before being traded to the Boston Bruins on July 5, 2011, for a fourth-round pick in the 2012 NHL entry draft. After one season with the Bruins, Corvo returned for a third stint with Hurricanes, signing a one-year $2 million deal on July 1, 2012. He scored six goals and eleven assists in the shortened 48-game season as the Hurricanes missed the playoffs.

==== Return to Ottawa ====
After one season with the Hurricanes, Corvo returned to the Ottawa Senators as a free agent, signing a one-year deal for $900,000 per season on July 8, 2013. On March 5, 2014, Corvo was loaned to the Chicago Wolves after clearing NHL waivers.

== Restaurant incident ==
Corvo was arrested in November 2002 in Boston after he grabbed a 34-year-old woman's buttocks in a restaurant. Restaurant staff told him to leave, but Corvo returned, punched the woman and then kicked her when she fell to the ground, police said. Corvo was given a three-year suspended sentence after he pleaded guilty to assault. Corvo was also suspended for three games by the Kings.

== Career statistics ==
=== Regular season and playoffs ===
			Regular season					Playoffs
Season	Team	League	GP	G	A	Pts	PIM	GP	G	A	Pts	PIM
1994–95	Omaha Lancers	USHL	40	4	9	13	12	—	—	—	—	—
1995–96	Western Michigan University	CCHA	41	5	25	30	38	—	—	—	—	—
1996–97	Western Michigan University	CCHA	32	12	21	33	85	—	—	—	—	—
1997–98	Western Michigan University	CCHA	32	5	12	17	93	—	—	—	—	—
1998–99	Springfield Falcons	AHL	50	5	15	20	32	—	—	—	—	—
1998–99	Hampton Roads Admirals	ECHL	5	0	0	0	15	4	0	1	1	0
2000–01	Lowell Lock Monsters	AHL	77	10	23	33	31	4	3	1	4	0
2001–02	Manchester Monarchs	AHL	80	13	37	50	30	5	0	5	5	0
2002–03	Manchester Monarchs	AHL	26	8	18	26	8	3	0	0	0	0
2002–03	Los Angeles Kings	NHL	50	5	7	12	14	—	—	—	—	—
2003–04	Los Angeles Kings	NHL	72	8	17	25	36	—	—	—	—	—
2004–05	Chicago Wolves	AHL	23	7	7	14	14	18	4	5	9	12
2005–06	Los Angeles Kings	NHL	81	14	26	40	38	—	—	—	—	—
2006–07	Ottawa Senators	NHL	76	8	29	37	42	20	2	7	9	6
2007–08	Ottawa Senators	NHL	51	6	21	27	18	—	—	—	—	—
2007–08	Carolina Hurricanes	NHL	23	7	14	21	8	—	—	—	—	—
2008–09	Carolina Hurricanes	NHL	81	14	24	38	18	18	2	5	7	4
2009–10	Carolina Hurricanes	NHL	34	4	4	8	12	—	—	—	—	—
2009–10	Washington Capitals	NHL	18	2	4	6	2	7	1	1	2	4
2010–11	Carolina Hurricanes	NHL	82	11	29	40	18	—	—	—	—	—
2011–12	Boston Bruins	NHL	75	4	21	25	13	5	0	0	0	0
2012–13	Carolina Hurricanes	NHL	40	6	11	17	14	—	—	—	—	—
2013–14	Ottawa Senators	NHL	25	3	7	10	10	—	—	—	—	—
2013–14	Chicago Wolves	AHL	10	1	4	5	0	9	0	4	4	9
NHL totals			708	92	218	310	241	50	5	13	18	14

=== International ===
Medal record

Representing United States

Ice hockey

World Junior Championships
Silver medal – second place	1997 Geneva	

Year	Team	Event	Result	GP	G	A	Pts	PIM
1997	United States	WJC	2nd place, silver medalist(s)	6	1	1	2	0
2003	United States	WC	13th	6	0	1	1	2
2006	United States	WC	7th	7	0	0	0	0
Junior totals				6	1	1	2	0
Senior totals				13	0	1	1	2

== Awards and honors ==
Award	Year
College
All-CCHA Rookie Team	1996
All-CCHA Second Team	1997
