= Erik Cole =

American ice hockey player (born 1978)

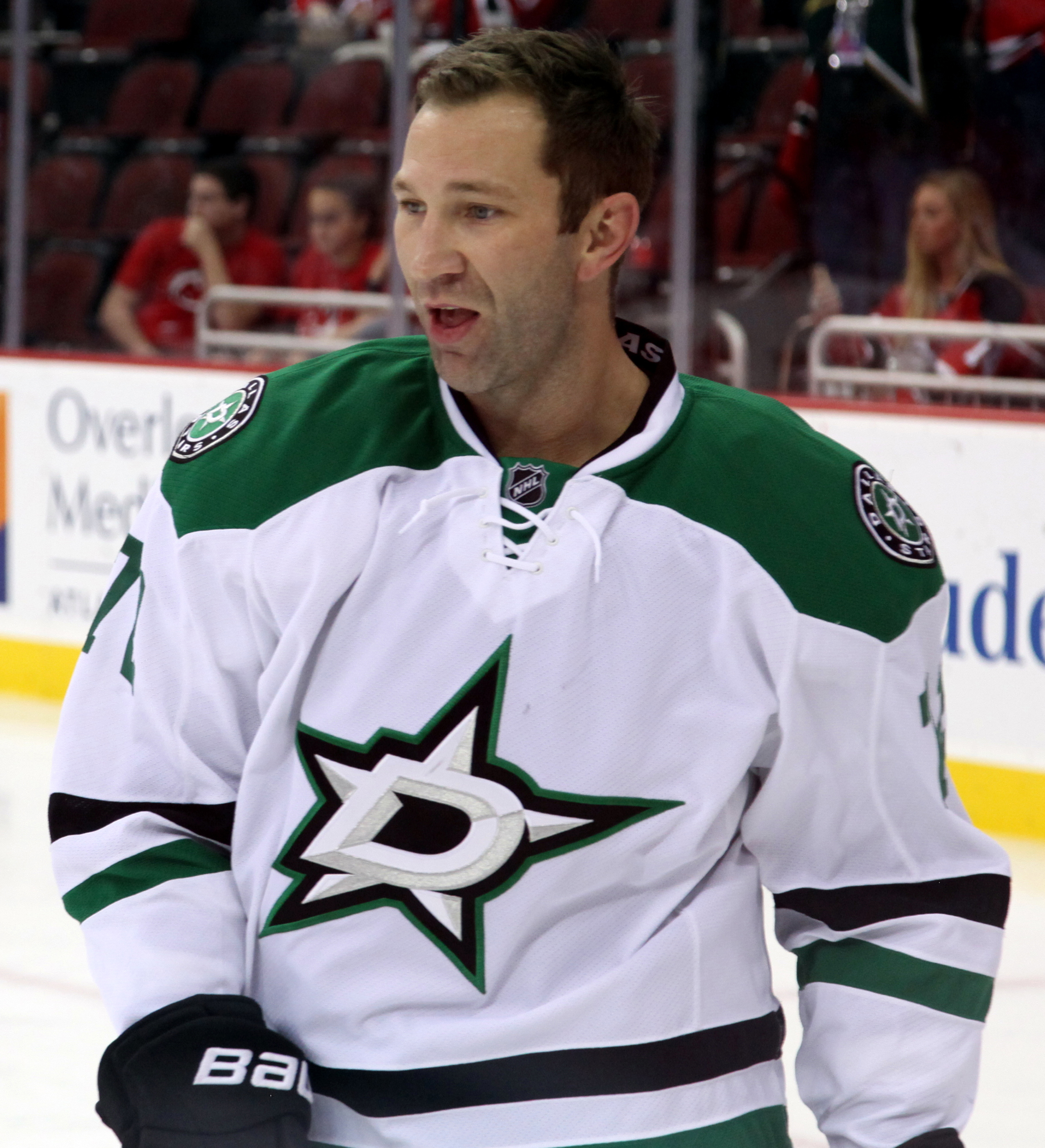
- Cole with the Dallas Stars in 2014
- Born: November 6, 1978 (age 47) Oswego, New York, U.S.
- Height: 6 ft 2 in (188 cm)
- Weight: 205 lb (93 kg; 14 st 9 lb)
- Position: Left wing
- Shot: Left
- Played for: Carolina Hurricanes; Edmonton Oilers; Montreal Canadiens; Dallas Stars; Detroit Red Wings
- National team: United States
- NHL draft: 71st overall, 1998; Carolina Hurricanes
- Playing career: 2000–2015

Erik Cole (born November 6, 1978) is an American former professional ice hockey left winger. Originally drafted by the Hurricanes in the 1998 NHL entry draft, Cole played 15 seasons in the NHL for the Carolina Hurricanes, Edmonton Oilers, Montreal Canadiens, Dallas Stars and Detroit Red Wings.

== Playing career ==
=== Amateur ===
Early in his career, Cole played high school ice hockey for Oswego in his hometown of Oswego, New York. He played 48 games for the Des Moines Buccaneers during the 1996-7 USHL season, scoring 30 goals and 34 assists for 64 points.

Cole then attended Clarkson University in Potsdam, New York, where he played college hockey for the Golden Knights ice hockey team in the NCAA's ECAC conference. At the end of his first season, the Carolina Hurricanes selected him 71st overall in the third round of the 1998 NHL entry draft. Cole would play two more collegiate seasons with the Golden Knights, departing in 2000.

=== Professional ===
In the 2001–02 season, his rookie year, Cole scored six goals during the 2002 Stanley Cup playoffs. Additionally, he was one-third of the "BBC Line," which also featured Bates Battaglia and Rod Brind'Amour, during the Hurricanes' Stanley Cup run in 2002.

On December 19, 2005, Cole was chosen to represent Team USA ice hockey for the 2006 Winter Olympics in Turin. He was named alongside fellow Clarkson University alumnus Craig Conroy, then of the Calgary Flames. He also represented Team USA the next year at the 2007 IIHF World Championship in Moscow.

In 2005, Cole became the first player in the NHL to ever be awarded two penalty shots in the same game.

On March 4, 2006, Cole suffered a fractured vertebra in his neck after getting hit by Pittsburgh Penguins defenseman Brooks Orpik. The injury kept him out of the lineup until game six of the 2006 Stanley Cup Final, where the Hurricanes won the Stanley Cup in game seven over the Edmonton Oilers. On November 12, 2007, Cole went head-first into Florida Panthers goaltender Tomáš Vokoun; he was face down on the ice for over five minutes and was escorted off the ice via stretcher. It was a neck injury but not serious, and he traveled with the team to Tampa Bay.

On July 1, 2008, Cole was acquired by the Edmonton Oilers in exchange for Joni Pitkänen. On January 14, 2009, Cole, as a member of the Oilers, recorded his fifth NHL hat-trick against the Washington Capitals on goaltender José Théodore. Cole set an unofficial NHL record in the Fastest Skater event by skating around the entire ice at Rexall Place with a time of 13.117 seconds.

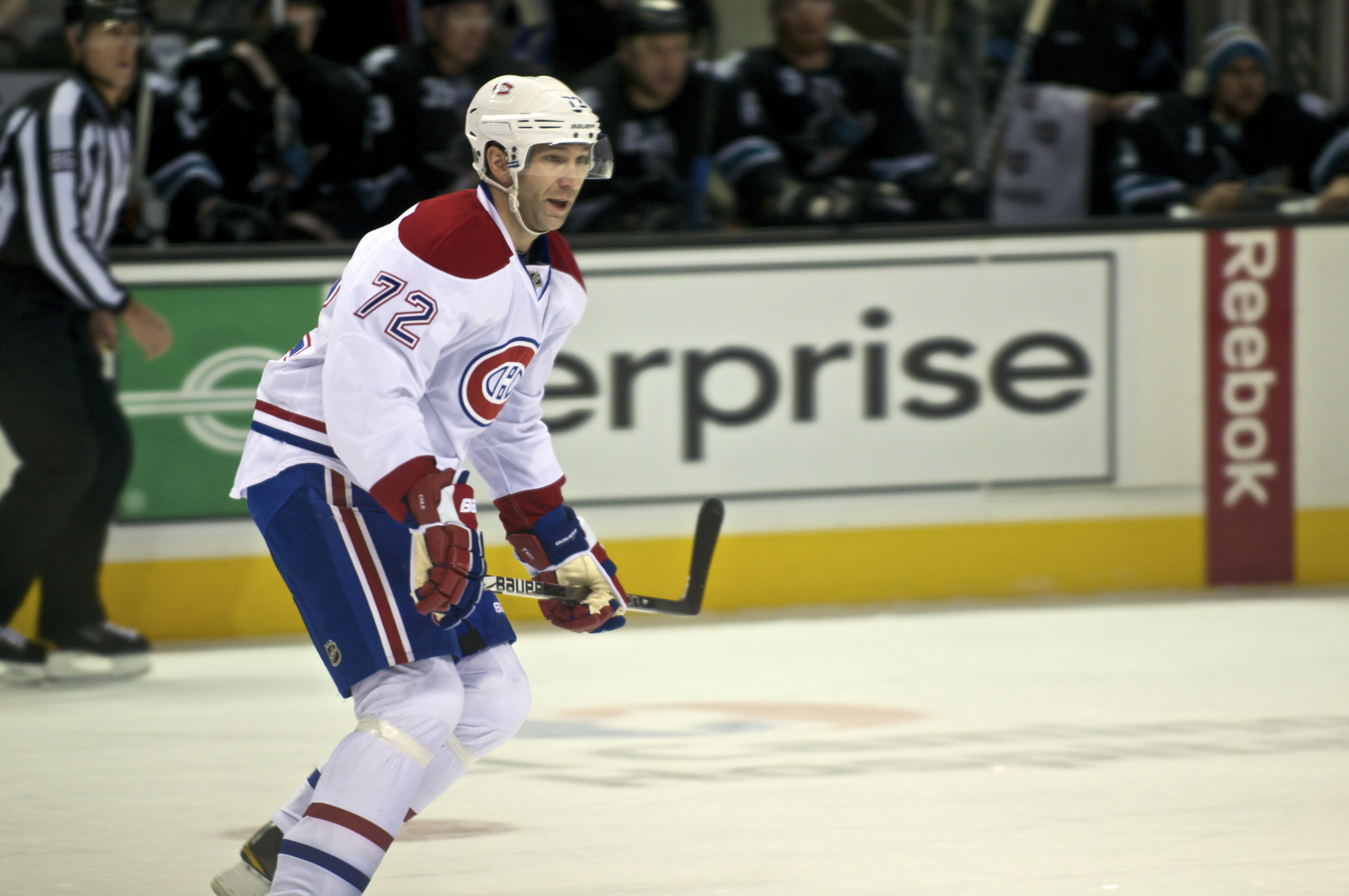
Cole pictured during his time with the Montreal Canadiens

On March 4, 2009, Cole was traded back to Carolina in exchange for Patrick O'Sullivan and a second-round draft pick; O'Sullivan was traded to Carolina for Justin Williams and second-round pick earlier that day. On July 1, 2009, the Hurricanes signed Cole to a two-year, $5.8 million contract, which paid $2.8 million in 2009–10 and $3 million in 2010–11). On December 5, 2009, Cole scored his sixth career hat-trick in a 5–3 win over the Vancouver Canucks.

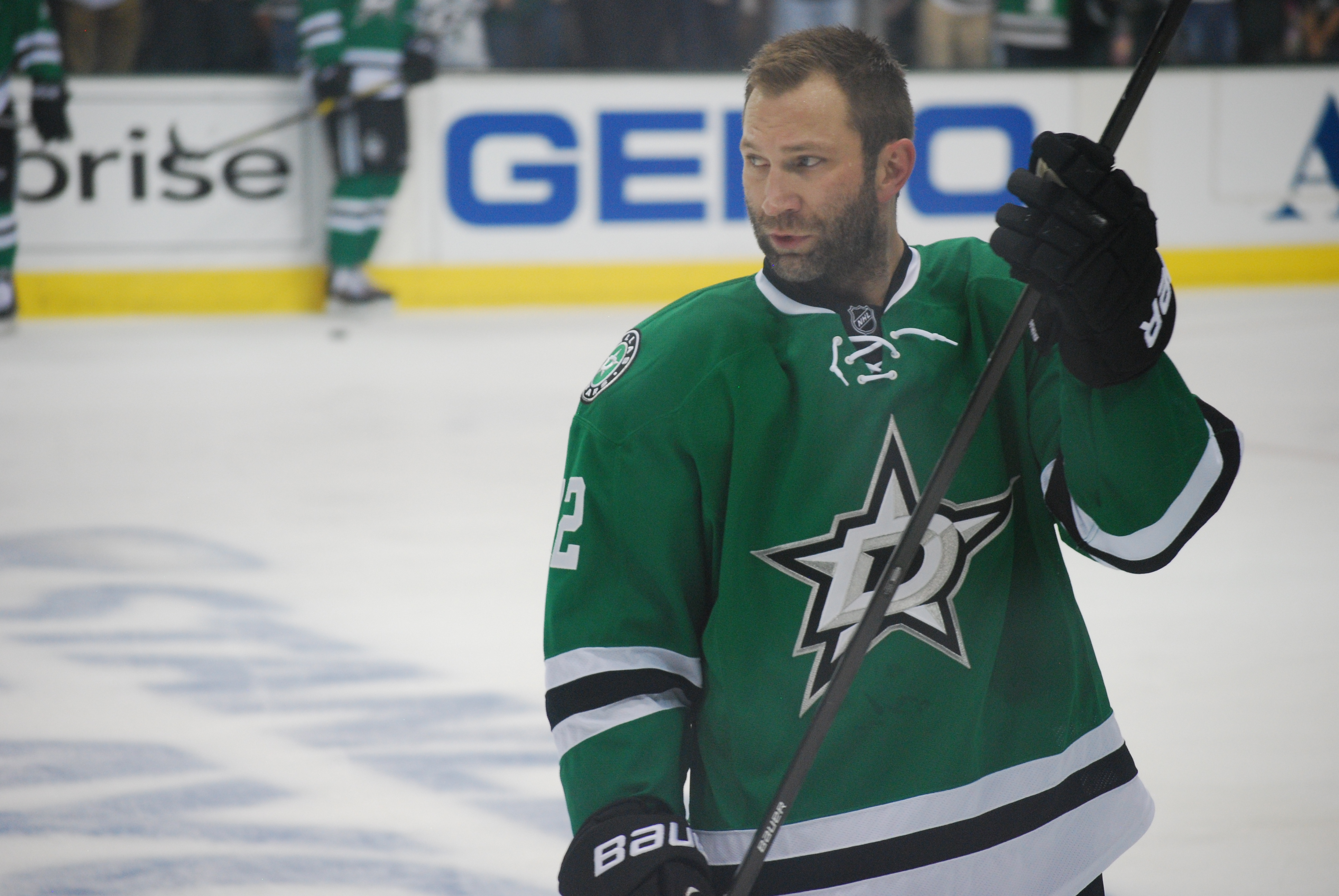
Cole in April 2014

On July 1, 2011, Cole signed a four-year, $18 million contract as a free agent with the Montreal Canadiens. Cole wore jersey number 72 for the Canadiens. During his first season with the Canadiens in 2011–12, Cole set career highs with 35 goals and 61 points. On March 23, 2012, Cole scored a natural hat-trick just 5:41 into a game against the Ottawa Senators, setting a Canadiens record for the quickest hat-trick from the start of a game.

On February 26, 2013, during the lockout-shortened 2012–13 season, after a slow start offensively, Cole was traded to the Dallas Stars in exchange for Michael Ryder and a third-round draft pick in 2013. In 28 games with Dallas, Cole would record six goals and one assist as the Stars would miss the 2013 playoffs.

On March 1, 2015, the Stars traded Cole to the Detroit Red Wings in exchange for Mattias Bäckman, Mattias Janmark-Nylén and a second-round draft pick in 2015. On April 8, it was announced that Cole would miss the remainder of the season with a spinal contusion he suffered on March 24 in a game against the Arizona Coyotes.

On September 20, 2017, Cole signed a one-day contract with the Carolina Hurricanes and subsequently announced his retirement from the NHL.

== Career statistics ==
=== Regular season and playoffs ===
			Regular season					Playoffs
Season	Team	League	GP	G	A	Pts	PIM	GP	G	A	Pts	PIM
1995–96	Oswego High School	HS-NY	40	49	41	90	—	—	—	—	—	—
1996–97	Des Moines Buccaneers	USHL	48	30	34	64	140	5	2	0	2	6
1997–98	Clarkson University	ECAC	34	11	20	31	55	—	—	—	—	—
1998–99	Clarkson University	ECAC	36	22	20	42	50	—	—	—	—	—
1999–00	Clarkson University	ECAC	33	19	11	30	46	—	—	—	—	—
1999–00	Cincinnati Cyclones	IHL	9	4	3	7	2	7	1	1	2	2
2000–01	Cincinnati Cyclones	IHL	69	23	20	43	28	5	1	0	1	2
2001–02	Carolina Hurricanes	NHL	81	16	24	40	35	23	6	3	9	30
2002–03	Carolina Hurricanes	NHL	53	14	13	27	72	—	—	—	—	—
2003–04	Carolina Hurricanes	NHL	80	18	24	42	93	—	—	—	—	—
2004–05	Eisbären Berlin	DEL	39	6	21	27	76	8	5	1	6	37
2005–06	Carolina Hurricanes	NHL	60	30	29	59	54	2	0	0	0	0
2006–07	Carolina Hurricanes	NHL	71	29	32	61	76	—	—	—	—	—
2007–08	Carolina Hurricanes	NHL	73	22	29	51	76	—	—	—	—	—
2008–09	Edmonton Oilers	NHL	63	16	11	27	63	—	—	—	—	—
2008–09	Carolina Hurricanes	NHL	17	2	13	15	10	18	0	5	5	22
2009–10	Carolina Hurricanes	NHL	40	11	5	16	29	—	—	—	—	—
2010–11	Carolina Hurricanes	NHL	82	26	26	52	49	—	—	—	—	—
2011–12	Montreal Canadiens	NHL	82	35	26	61	48	—	—	—	—	—
2012–13	Montreal Canadiens	NHL	19	3	3	6	10	—	—	—	—	—
2012–13	Dallas Stars	NHL	28	6	1	7	10	—	—	—	—	—
2013–14	Dallas Stars	NHL	75	16	13	29	20	3	0	0	0	2
2014–15	Dallas Stars	NHL	57	18	15	33	14	—	—	—	—	—
2014–15	Detroit Red Wings	NHL	11	3	3	6	0	—	—	—	—	—
NHL totals			892	265	267	532	659	46	6	8	14	54

=== International ===
Year	Team	Event	Result	GP	G	A	Pts	PIM
2005	United States	WC	6th	7	1	5	6	6
2006	United States	OG	8th	6	1	2	3	0
2007	United States	WC	5th	7	1	4	5	2
Senior totals				20	3	11	14	8

== Awards and honors ==
Award	Year
All-ECAC Hockey Rookie Team	1997–98
All-ECAC Hockey First Team	1998–99
AHCA East Second-Team All-American	1998–99
ECAC Hockey All-Tournament Team	1999
All-ECAC Hockey Second team	1999–00
DEL Champion	2004–05
Stanley Cup (Carolina Hurricanes)	2005–06

Awards and achievements
Preceded by J.R. Prestifilippo	ECAC Hockey Rookie of the Year; 1997–98; Shared With; Willie Mitchell	Succeeded by Brandon Dietrich
