= 1999 ECAC Hockey men's ice hockey tournament =

1999 ECAC Men's ice hockey tournament
- Dates: March 12–20, 1999
- Teams: 10
- Finals site: Olympic Arena; Lake Placid, New York
- Champions: Clarkson (4th title)
- Winning coach: Mark Morris (3rd title)
- MVP: Willie Mitchell (Clarkson)
- ECAC Men's Ice Hockey Tournaments

The 1999 ECAC Hockey Men's Ice Hockey Tournament was the 38th tournament in league history. It was played between March 12 and March 20, 1999. Quarterfinal games were played at home team campus sites, while the final five games were played at the Olympic Arena (subsequently renamed Herb Brooks Arena) in Lake Placid, New York. By winning the tournament, Clarkson received the ECAC's automatic bid to the 1999 NCAA Division I Men's Ice Hockey Tournament.

== Format ==
The tournament featured three rounds of play. The two teams that finish below tenth place in the standings are not eligible for tournament play. In the first round, the first and tenth seeds, the second and ninth seeds, the third seed and eighth seeds, the fourth seed and seventh seeds and the fifth seed and sixth seeds played a modified best-of-three series, where the first team to receive 3 points moves on, with the three highest-seeded winners advancing to the semifinals and the remaining two winners playing in the Four vs. Five matchup. After the opening round every series becomes a single-elimination game. In the semifinals, the highest seed plays the winner of the four vs. five game while the two remaining teams play with the winners advancing to the championship game and the losers advancing to the third place game. The tournament champion receives an automatic bid to the 1999 NCAA Men's Division I Ice Hockey Tournament.

== Conference standings ==
Note: GP = Games played; W = Wins; L = Losses; T = Ties; PTS = Points; GF = Goals For; GA = Goals Against

1998–99 ECAC Hockey standings
	Conference							Overall					
	GP	W	L	T	PTS	GF	GA	GP	W	L	T	GF	GA
#9 Clarkson†*	22	18	4	0	36	91	48	37	25	11	1	133	102
#10 St. Lawrence	22	15	4	3	33	80	47	39	23	13	3	136	110
Rensselaer	22	13	7	2	28	89	62	37	23	12	2	147	110
Princeton	22	13	8	1	27	69	62	34	20	12	2	116	106
Yale	22	11	7	4	26	65	56	31	13	14	4	86	94
Colgate	22	12	8	2	26	66	56	35	19	12	4	109	87
Cornell	22	9	10	3	21	67	63	31	12	15	4	96	97
Harvard	22	8	12	2	18	64	87	32	14	16	2	94	115
Vermont	22	7	13	2	16	53	67	33	13	18	2	86	104
Brown	22	5	12	5	15	56	72	31	9	16	6	87	97
Dartmouth	22	6	14	5	14	60	79	29	10	17	2	90	109
Union	22	1	19	2	4	32	93	32	3	26	3	52	132
Championship: Clarkson † indicates conference regular season champion * indicates conference tournament champion (Whitelaw Cup); Final rankings: USA Today/American Hockey Magazine Coaches Poll Top 10 Poll

== Bracket ==
Teams are reseeded after the First Round

First Round; March 12–14
1	Clarkson	3*	3	—
10	Brown	2	1	—
2	St. Lawrence	9	4	—
9	Vermont	2	1	—
3	Rensselaer	1	4	4
8	Harvard	2	0	2
4	Princeton	4*	6	—
7	Cornell	4	5	—
5	Yale	1	2	—
6	Colgate	5	7	—

Four vs. Five; March 18
4	Princeton	3
6	Colgate	2

Semifinals; March 19
1	Clarkson	6
4	Princeton	5
2	St. Lawrence	6
3	Rensselaer	3

Championship; March 20
1	Clarkson	3
2	St. Lawrence	2

Note: * denotes overtime period(s)

=== First round ===
==== (1) Clarkson vs. (10) Brown ====
March 12	Clarkson	3 – 2	OT	Brown	Cheel Arena
Mikko Ollila - 06:54; Willie Mitchell - 11:32		First period		No scoring
No scoring		Second period		06:59 - Adrian Smith; 19:34 - Adrian Smith
No scoring		Third period		No scoring
Kent Huskins - GW - 00:55		First overtime period		No scoring
Shawn Grant ( 16 saves / 18 shots )		Goalie stats		Scott Stirling ( 38 saves / 41 shots )

March 13	Clarkson	3 – 1	Brown	Cheel Arena
No Scoring		First period	No scoring
No scoring		Second period	11:35 - PP - Michael Bent
Carl Drakensjo - 04:16; Kent Huskins - GW - 09:39; Erik Cole - 16:22		Third period	No scoring
Shawn Grant ( 11 saves / 12 shots )		Goalie stats	Scott Stirling ( 4 saves / 4 shots ) / Brian Eklund ( 29 saves / 32 shots )

Clarkson won series 2–0

==== (2) St. Lawrence vs. (9) Vermont ====
March 12	St. Lawrence	9 – 2	Vermont	Appleton Arena
Al Fyfe - 07:54; Mike Gellard - 08:11; Mike Gellard - GW - 11:10; Mike Gellard - 14:52; Al Fyfe - 18:24		First period	15:26 - Don Richardson
Brandon Dietrich - 04:46; Brandon Dietrich - 09:58; Ray DiLauro - 10:58		Second period	08:01 - Mike Torney
Josh LeRoy - 03:21		Third period	No scoring
Eric Heffler ( 33 saves / 35 shots )		Goalie stats	Andrew Allen ( 11 saves / 16 shots ) / Tim Peters ( 4 saves / 7 shots ) / Marty Phillips ( 7 saves / 8 shots )

March 13	St. Lawrence	4 – 1	Vermont	Appleton Arena
John Poapst - 00:34		First period	No scoring
Ray DiLauro - GW - 18:50		Second period	03:20 - Kevin Karlander
Matt Oikawa - 17:32; Bob Prier - EN - 19:03		Third period	No scoring
Eric Heffler ( 35 saves / 36 shots )		Goalie stats	Andrew Allen ( 38 saves / 41 shots )

St. Lawrence won series 2–0

==== (3) Rensselaer vs. (8) Harvard ====
March 12	Rensselaer	1 – 2	Harvard	Houston Field House
No Scoring		First period	05:00 - Trevor Allman
No scoring		Second period	No scoring
Keith Dupree - 01:28		Third period	09:42 - Steve Moore
Joel Laing ( 29 saves / 31 shots )		Goalie stats	Oliver Jonas ( 32 saves / 33 shots )

March 13	Rensselaer	4 – 0	Harvard	Houston Field House
No Scoring		First period	No scoring
Matt Murley - GW PP - 07:19		Second period	No scoring
Matt Murley - PP - 15:58; Dan Riva - PP - 18:34; Mark Murphy - EN - 19:20		Third period	No scoring
Joel Laing ( 35 saves / 35 shots )		Goalie stats	Oliver Jonas ( 26 saves / 28 shots )

March 14	Rensselaer	4 – 2	Harvard	Houston Field House
Mark Murphy - PP - 03:26; Erick James - 17:47		First period	00:22 - Rob Millar
No scoring		Second period	16:07 - Matt Scorsune
Doug Shepherd - GW - 06:57; Brad Tapper - 13:37		Third period	No scoring
Joel Laing ( 39 saves / 41 shots )		Goalie stats	Oliver Jonas ( 28 saves / 32 shots )

Rensselaer won series 2–1

==== (4) Princeton vs. (7) Cornell ====
March 12	Princeton	4 – 4	OT	Cornell	Baker Rink
Scott Bertoli - 12:01		First period		No scoring
Brad Parsons - 02:06; Benoit Morin - PP - 10:23; Syl Apps III - PP - 10:58		Second period		06:57 - Krzysztof Wieckowski; 18:37 - David Hovey
No scoring		Third period		08:07 - PP - Kyle Knopp; 12:01 - PP - Ryan Moynihan
Dave Stathos ( 21 saves / 25 shots )		Goalie stats		Matt Underhill ( 31 saves / 35 shots )

March 13	Princeton	6 – 5	Cornell	Baker Rink
No Scoring		First period	05:52 - PP - David Kozier; 14:01 - Ryan Moynihan
Ethan Doyle - SH - 07:11; Jeff Halpern - PP - 11:17		Second period	07:45 - PP - David Kozier; 09:33 - PP - Doug Stienstra
Benoit Morin - SH - 00:58; Syl Apps III - 02:10; Brad Meredith - 15:56; Michael Acosta - GW - 16:23		Third period	08:49 - Daniel Svoboda
Dave Stathos ( 16 saves / 21 shots )		Goalie stats	Matt Underhill ( 23 saves / 29 shots )

Princeton won series 1–0–1

==== (5) Yale vs. (6) Colgate ====
March 12	Yale	1 – 5	Colgate	Ingalls Rink
No Scoring		First period	12:01 - Darryl Campbell
No scoring		Second period	06:38 - GW PP - Etienne Morin; 09:00 - Dan Wildfong; 17:35 - Etienne Morin
Cory Shea - 06:15		Third period	05:51 - Ryan Faubert
Alex Westlund ( 20 saves / 24 shots ) / Trevor Hanger ( 5 saves / 6 shots )		Goalie stats	Shep Harder ( 22 saves / 23 shots )

March 13	Yale	2 – 7	Colgate	Ingalls Rink
No Scoring		First period	09:34 - PP - Cory Murphy; 13:17 - Darryl Campbell
No scoring		Second period	02:33 - GW - Darryl Campbell; 05:20 - Darryl Campbell; 09:35 - Dan Wildfong; 14:08 - Chad McDonald
Francois Magnant - 00:23; Francois Magnant - 15:36		Third period	16:42 - Chad McDonald
Alex Westlund ( 21 saves / 28 shots )		Goalie stats	Shep Harder ( 20 saves / 22 shots )

Colgate won series 2–0

=== Four vs. Five ===
==== (4) Princeton vs. (6) Colgate ====
March 18	Princeton	3 – 2	Colgate	Olympic Arena
No Scoring		First period	No scoring
Benoit Morin - 05:24		Second period	14:03 - PP - Andy McDonald; 16:40 - Sean Nolan
Scott Bertoli - PP - 05:24; Benoit Morin - GW - 15:46		Third period	No scoring
Dave Stathos ( 21 saves / 23 shots )		Goalie stats	Shep Harder ( 40 saves / 43 shots )

=== Semifinals ===
==== (1) Clarkson vs. (4) Princeton ====
March 19	Clarkson	6 – 5	Princeton	Olympic Arena
Kent Huskins - 00:45; Carl Drakensjo - 04:13; David Evans - 05:24; Willie Mitchell - 14:55		First period	No scoring
No scoring		Second period	12:08 - Jeff Halpern; 12:57 - Chris Corrinet; 19:17 - Jeff Halpern
Don Smith - 07:55; Willie Mitchell - GW - 19:57		Third period	15:43 - Steve Shirreffs; 19:17 - EA - Scott Bertoli
Shawn Grant ( 22 saves / 27 shots )		Goalie stats	Dave Stathos ( 6 saves / 9 shots ) / Craig Bradley ( 37 saves / 40 shots )

==== (2) St. Lawrence vs. (3) Rensselaer ====
March 19	St. Lawrence	6 – 3	Rensselaer	Olympic Arena
Sean Muir - 02:26; Bob Prier - PP - 13:39		First period	06:58 - Dan Riva
Justin Harney - 06:51; Erik Anderson - GW - 16:09		Second period	14:46 - Dan Riva
Mike Gellard - 09:10; Matt Oikawa - 15:18		Third period	17:41 - Mark Murphy
Eric Heffler ( 40 saves / 43 shots )		Goalie stats	Joel Laing ( 34 saves / 40 shots )

=== Third place ===
==== (3) Rensselaer vs. (4) Princeton ====
March 20	Rensselaer	6 – 4	Princeton	Olympic Arena
Brian Pothier - 03:30; Brad Tapper - PP - 11:53		First period	No scoring
Alain St. Hilaire - PP - 03:34; Matt Murley - 14:43; Dan Riva - GW - 17:16		Second period	07:44 - Brian Horst; 17:43 - Jeff Halpern
Dan Riva - EN - 19:29		Third period	05:02 - SH - Kirk Lamb; 07:50 - David Del Monte
Dave Stathos ( 5 saves / 7 shots ) / Craig Bradley ( 24 saves / 27 shots )		Goalie stats	Scott Prekaski ( 36 saves / 40 shots )

=== Championship ===
==== (1) Clarkson vs. (2) St. Lawrence ====
March 20	Clarkson	3 – 2	St. Lawrence	Olympic Arena
Jim Sheehan - 12:24		First period	No scoring
Erik Cole - 06:21		Second period	05:20 - Robin Carruthers; 05:44 - Mike Gellard
Ben Maidment - GW - 11:25		Third period	No scoring
Shawn Grant ( 46 saves / 48 shots )		Goalie stats	Eric Heffler ( 42 saves / 45 shots )

== Tournament awards ==
=== All-Tournament Team ===
- F Erik Cole (Clarkson)
- F Dan Riva (Rensselaer)
- F Jeff Halpern (Princeton)
- D Willie Mitchell* (Clarkson)
- D Justin Harney (St. Lawrence)
- G Eric Heffler (St. Lawrence)

* Most Outstanding Player(s)
