= List of Princeton Tigers men's ice hockey seasons =

This is a season-by-season list of records compiled by Princeton in men's ice hockey. Princeton's team has been continually active since 1899 with the exception of three years due to the two world wars.

Princeton University has been named as the National Champion three times with all occurrences happening prior to any official NCAA Tournament.

== Season-by-season results ==
Note: GP = Games played, W = Wins, L = Losses, T = Ties

NCAA D-I Champions	NCAA Frozen Four	Conference regular season champions	Conference Division Champions	Conference Playoff Champions

Season	Conference	Regular Season (Note: Code explanation; GP—Games Played, W—Wins, L—Losses, T—Tied games, OTW—Overtime Wins, OTL—Overtime Loses, 3/SW—Win in 3 on 3 overtime or shootout, Pts—Points*)														Conference Tournament Results	National Tournament Results
Season	Conference	Conference									Overall					Conference Tournament Results	National Tournament Results
Season	Conference	GP	W	L	T	OTW	OTL	3/SW	Pts*	Finish	GP	W	L	T	%	Conference Tournament Results	National Tournament Results
No Coach (1900–1917)
1899–1900	IHA	4	0	3	1	–	–	–	1	T–3rd	6	0	5	1	.083		
1900–01	IHA	4	2	2	0	–	–	–	4	3rd	13	7	6	0	.538		
1901–02	IHA	4	2	2	0	–	–	–	4	3rd	9	5	3	1	.611		
1902–03	IHA	4	2	2	0	–	–	–	4	T–2nd	11	5	5	1	.500		
1903–04	IHA	4	1	3	0	–	–	–	2	4th	11	5	5	1	.500		
1904–05	IHA	4	1	3	0	–	–	–	2	4th	6	1	4	1	.250		
1905–06	IHA	4	1	3	0	–	–	–	2	4th	13	6	7	0	.462		
1906–07	IHA	4	4	0	0	–	–	–	8	1st	7	4	3	0	.571		Intercollegiate Champion
1907–08	IHA	4	1	3	0	–	–	–	2	T–3rd	11	5	6	0	.455		
1908–09	IHA	4	1	2	1	–	–	–	3	T–3rd	11	7	3	1	.682		
1909–10	IHA	5	5	0	0	–	–	–	10	1st	10	7	3	0	.700		Intercollegiate Champion
1910–11	IHA	5	1	4	0	–	–	–	2	T–5th	10	6	4	0	.600		
1911–12	IHA	4	4	0	0	–	–	–	8	1st	10	8	2	0	.800		Intercollegiate Champion
1912–13	IHA	2	2	0	0	–	–	–	4	1st	14	12	2	0	.857		
1912–13	IHL	5	3	2	0	–	–	–	1	2nd	14	12	2	0	.857		
1913–14	IHL	5	4	1	0	–	–	–	2	1st	13	10	3	0	.769		Intercollegiate Champion
1914–15	IHL	5	1	4	0	–	–	–	0	3rd	12	6	6	0	.500		
1915–16	IHL	5	1	4	0	–	–	–	0	3rd	10	5	5	0	.500		
1916–17	IHL	6	3	3	0	–	–	–	1	T–1st	10	5	5	0	.500		
Program suspended due to World War I
No Coach (1918–1920)
1918–19	Independent	–	–	–	–	–	–	–	–	–	2	0	2	0	.000		
1919–20	THL	4	0	4	0	–	–	–	0	3rd	10	2	8	0	.200		
Russell O. Ellis (1920–1921)
1920–21	THL	3	2	1	0	–	–	–	1	2nd	8	4	4	0	.500		
Moylan McDonnell (1921–1922)
1921–22	THL	4	0	4	0	–	–	–	0	3rd	10	3	6	1	.350		
Chippy Gaw (1922–1924)
1922–23	THL	6	2	4	0	–	–	–	0	3rd	18	12	5	1	.694		
1923–24	THL	5	1	4	0	–	–	–	0	3rd	18	12	6	0	.667		
Beattie Ramsay (1924–1927)
1924–25	THL	4	0	4	0	–	–	–	0	3rd	17	8	9	0	.471		
1925–26	THL	4	2	2	0	–	–	–	1	2nd	16	7	9	0	.438		
1926–27	Independent	–	–	–	–	–	–	–	–	–	13	5	7	1	.423		
Lloyd Neidlinger (1927–1933)
1927–28	Independent	–	–	–	–	–	–	–	–	–	12	5	7	0	.417		
1928–29	Independent	–	–	–	–	–	–	–	–	–	19	15	3	1	.816		
1929–30	Independent	–	–	–	–	–	–	–	–	–	18	9	8	1	.528		
1930–31	Independent	–	–	–	–	–	–	–	–	–	19	14	5	0	.737		
1931–32	Independent	–	–	–	–	–	–	–	–	–	18	13	4	1	.750		
1932–33	Independent	–	–	–	–	–	–	–	–	–	19	15	4	0	.789		
Frank Fredrickson (1933–1935)
1933–34	Quadrangular League	6	2	4	0	–	–	–	.333	3rd	17	10	7	0	.588		
1934–35	Quadrangular League	6	1	5	0	–	–	–	.167	T–3rd	16	5	11	0	.313		
Richard Vaughan (1935–1943)
1935–36	Quadrangular League	6	3	3	0	–	–	–	.500	T–2nd	22	13	8	1	.614		
1936–37	Quadrangular League	6	1	5	0	–	–	–	.167	4th	17	6	11	0	.353		
1937–38	Quadrangular League	6	1	4	1	–	–	–	.250	4th	18	5	12	1	.306		
1938–39	Quadrangular League	6	2	4	0	–	–	–	.333	3rd	21	11	10	0	.524		
1939–40	Quadrangular League	6	4	1	1	–	–	–	.750	2nd	19	9	7	3	.553		
1940–41	Quadrangular League	6	5	1	0	–	–	–	.833	1st	15	9	5	1	.633		
1941–42	Quadrangular League	6	2	4	0	–	–	–	.333	3rd	16	10	6	0	.625		
1942–43	Quadrangular League	6	0	6	0	–	–	–	.000	4th	12	3	9	0	.250		
Program suspended due to World War II
Richard Vaughan (1945–1959)
1945–46	Independent	–	–	–	–	–	–	–	–	–	4	1	3	0	.250		
1946–47	Pentagonal League	4	1	3	0	–	–	–	.250	4th	13	6	6	1	.500		
1947–48	Pentagonal League	7	2	5	0	–	–	–	.286	T–4th	21	10	11	0	.476		
1948–49	Pentagonal League	8	1	7	0	–	–	–	.125	5th	20	6	13	1	.325		
1949–50	Pentagonal League	8	2	6	0	–	–	–	.250	5th	20	6	13	1	.325		
1950–51	Pentagonal League	8	3	5	0	–	–	–	.375	4th	18	7	10	1	.417		
1951–52	Pentagonal League	8	4	4	0	–	–	–	.500	3rd	15	8	7	0	.533		
1952–53	Pentagonal League	8	6	2	0	–	–	–	.750	1st	18	11	7	0	.611		
1953–54	Pentagonal League	8	2	5	1	–	–	–	.313	5th	18	4	12	2	.278		
1954–55	Pentagonal League	8	4	3	1	–	–	–	.563	T–2nd	17	8	8	1	.500		
1955–56	Independent	–	–	–	–	–	–	–	–	–	20	11	9	0	.550		
1956–57	Independent	–	–	–	–	–	–	–	–	–	19	2	17	0	.105		
1957–58	Independent	–	–	–	–	–	–	–	–	–	18	7	11	0	.389		
1958–59	Independent	–	–	–	–	–	–	–	–	–	23	6	16	1	.283		
R. Norman Wood (1959–1965)
1959–60	Independent	–	–	–	–	–	–	–	–	–	23	12	11	0	.522		
1960–61	Independent	–	–	–	–	–	–	–	–	–	23	9	14	0	.391		
1961–62	ECAC Hockey	21	8	12	1	–	–	–	.405	19th	21	8	12	1	.405		
1962–63	ECAC Hockey	21	5	16	0	–	–	–	.238	25th	23	6	17	0	.261		
1963–64	ECAC Hockey	22	6	16	0	–	–	–	.273	24th	24	8	16	0	.333		
University Division
1964–65	ECAC Hockey	21	4	17	0	–	–	–	.190	14th	24	6	18	0	.250		
Johnny Wilson (1965–1967)
1965–66	ECAC Hockey	19	6	12	1	–	–	–	.342	12th	20	7	12	1	.375		
1966–67	ECAC Hockey	20	6	14	0	–	–	–	.300	13th	22	7	15	0	.318		
Bill Quackenbush (1967–1973)
1967–68	ECAC Hockey	23	13	9	1	–	–	–	.587	8th	24	13	10	1	.563	Lost Quarterfinal, 1–6 (Cornell)	
1968–69	ECAC Hockey	23	5	18	0	–	–	–	.217	16th	24	5	19	0	.208		
1969–70	ECAC Hockey	21	5	15	1	–	–	–	.262	14th	23	5	17	1	.239		
1970–71	ECAC Hockey	21	1	20	0	–	–	–	.048	17th	23	1	22	0	.043		
1971–72	ECAC Hockey	19	5	14	0	–	–	–	.263	T–14th	23	5	18	0	.217		
1972–73	ECAC Hockey	21	3	18	0	–	–	–	.143	15th	23	5	18	0	.217		
Division I
Jack Semler (1973–1977)
1973–74	ECAC Hockey	20	7	12	1	–	–	–	.375	14th	24	9	14	1	.396		
1974–75	ECAC Hockey	20	5	13	2	–	–	–	.300	14th	23	6	15	2	.304		
1975–76	ECAC Hockey	23	6	16	1	–	–	–	.283	T–14th	24	7	16	1	.313		
1976–77	ECAC Hockey	24	3	20	1	–	–	–	.146	17th	25	3	21	1	.140		
Jim Higgins (1977–1991)
1977–78	ECAC Hockey	21	7	13	1	–	–	–	.357	14th	25	9	14	2	.400		
1978–79	ECAC Hockey	21	2	15	4	–	–	–	.190	16th	26	5	17	4	.269		
1979–80	ECAC Hockey	21	9	12	0	–	–	–	.429	11th	26	11	15	0	.423		
1980–81	ECAC Hockey	21	10	11	0	–	–	–	.476	T–10th	25	12	13	0	.480		
1981–82	ECAC Hockey	21	7	12	2	–	–	–	.381	13th	26	9	14	3	.404		
1982–83	ECAC Hockey	21	7	12	2	–	–	–	.381	13th	25	9	14	2	.400		
1983–84	ECAC Hockey	21	5	15	1	–	–	–	.262	T–15th	25	6	18	1	.260		
1984–85	ECAC Hockey	21	7	12	2	–	–	–	16	8th	28	12	14	2	.464	Lost Quarterfinal series, 0–2 (Rensselaer)	
1985–86	ECAC Hockey	21	7	13	0	–	–	–	14	9th	30	11	17	2	.400		
1986–87	ECAC Hockey	22	7	14	1	–	–	–	15	10th	26	8	17	1	.327		
1987–88	ECAC Hockey	22	11	10	1	–	–	–	23	T–6th	28	12	15	1	.446	Lost Quarterfinal series, 0–2 (St. Lawrence)	
1988–89	ECAC Hockey	22	4	17	1	–	–	–	9	11th	26	6	19	1	.250		
1989–90	ECAC Hockey	22	11	10	1	–	–	–	23	7th	27	12	14	1	.463	Lost First round, 1–5 (Yale)	
1990–91	ECAC Hockey	22	7	14	1	–	–	–	15	10th	27	8	18	1	.315	Lost First round, 2–5 (Colgate)	
Don Cahoon (1991–2000)
1991–92	ECAC Hockey	22	9	12	1	–	–	–	19	9th	27	12	14	1	.463	Won First round, 3–4 (Colgate); Lost Quarterfinal, 3–6 (St. Lawrence)	
1992–93	ECAC Hockey	22	6	13	3	–	–	–	15	10th	29	9	17	3	.362	Won Preliminary Round, 1–3 (Vermont); Lost Quarterfinal series, 0–2 (Harvard)	
1993–94	ECAC Hockey	22	7	12	3	–	–	–	17	9th	28	10	15	3	.411	Lost Preliminary Round, 4–5 (OT) (Cornell)	
1994–95	ECAC Hockey	22	9	10	3	–	–	–	21	7th	35	18	13	4	.571	Won Preliminary Round, 5–2 (Union); Won Quarterfinal series, 2–1 (Brown); Won Semifinal, 2–1 (Clarkson); Lost Championship, 1–5 (Rensselaer)	
1995–96	ECAC Hockey	22	5	14	2	–	–	–	13	10th	30	7	19	4	.300	Lost Preliminary Round, 3–4 (Brown)	
1996–97	ECAC Hockey	22	11	8	3	–	–	–	25	T–5th	34	18	12	4	.588	Won Quarterfinal series, 2–1 (Vermont); Lost Semifinal, 1–5 (Clarkson); Lost Third-place game, 4–8 (Rensselaer)	
1997–98	ECAC Hockey	22	7	9	6	–	–	–	20	7th	36	18	11	7	.597	Won First round series, 2–1 (Brown); Won Four vs. Five, 6–2 (Cornell); Won Semifinal, 2–1 (Yale); Won Championship 5–4 (2OT) (Clarkson)	Lost Regional Quarterfinal, 1–2 (Michigan)
1998–99	ECAC Hockey	22	13	8	1	–	–	–	27	4th	34	20	12	2	.618	Won First round series, 1–0–1 (Cornell); Won Four vs. Five, 3–2 (Colgate); Lost Semifinal, 5–6 (Clarkson); Lost Third-place game, 4–6 (Rensselaer)	
1999–2000	ECAC Hockey	21	8	9	4	–	–	–	20	T–6th	30	10	16	4	.400	Lost First round series, 0–2 (Clarkson)	
Len Quesnelle (2000–2004)
2000–01	ECAC Hockey	22	9	9	4	–	–	–	22	7th	31	10	16	5	.403	Lost First round series, 0–2 (Cornell)	
2001–02	ECAC Hockey	22	10	10	2	–	–	–	22	T–6th	31	11	18	2	.387	Lost First round series, 0–2 (Rensselaer)	
2002–03	ECAC Hockey	22	2	18	2	–	–	–	6	12th	31	3	26	2	.129	Lost First round series, 0–2 (Brown)	
2003–04	ECAC Hockey	22	5	15	2	–	–	–	12	12th	31	5	24	2	.194	Lost First round series, 0–2 (Rensselaer)	
Guy Gadowsky (2004–2011)
2004–05	ECAC Hockey	22	6	14	2	–	–	–	14	10th	31	8	20	3	.306	Lost First round series, 0–2 (St. Lawrence)	
2005–06	ECAC Hockey	22	7	12	3	–	–	–	17	T–9th	31	10	18	3	.371	Lost First round series, 0–2 (Clarkson)	
2006–07	ECAC Hockey	22	10	10	2	–	–	–	22	T–6th	34	15	16	3	.485	Won First round series, 2–1 (Brown); Lost Quarterfinal series 0–2 (Dartmouth)	
2007–08	ECAC Hockey	22	14	8	0	–	–	–	28	2nd	35	21	14	0	.600	Won Quarterfinal series, 2–1 (Yale); Won Semifinal, 3–0 (Colgate); Won Championship 4–1 (Harvard)	Lost Regional semifinal, 1–5 (North Dakota)
2008–09	ECAC Hockey	22	14	8	0	–	–	–	28	3rd	35	22	12	1	.643	Won Quarterfinal series, 2–1 (Union); Lost Semifinal, 3–4 (2OT) (Cornell); Tied Third-place game, 2–2 (St. Lawrence)	Lost Regional semifinal, 4–5 (OT) (Minnesota–Duluth)
2009–10	ECAC Hockey	22	8	12	2	–	–	–	18	8th	31	12	16	3	.435	Lost First round series, 0–2 (Harvard)	
2010–11	ECAC Hockey	22	11	9	2	–	–	–	15	T–4th	32	17	13	2	.563	Lost First round series, 1–2 (St. Lawrence)	
Bob Prier (2011–2014)
2011–12	ECAC Hockey	22	6	12	4	–	–	–	16	11th	32	9	16	7	.391	Lost First round series, 1–2 (Yale)	
2012–13	ECAC Hockey	22	8	10	4	–	–	–	20	T–7th	31	10	16	5	.403	Lost First round series, 0–2 (Cornell)	
2013–14	ECAC Hockey	22	4	18	0	–	–	–	8	12th	32	6	26	0	.188	Lost First round series, 1–2 (Clarkson)	
Ron Fogarty (2014–2024)
2014–15	ECAC Hockey	22	2	18	2	–	–	–	6	12th	30	4	23	3	.183	Lost First round series, 0–2 (Dartmouth)	
2015–16	ECAC Hockey	22	3	16	3	–	–	–	9	12th	31	5	23	3	.210	Lost Quarterfinal series, 0–2 (Clarkson)	
2016–17	ECAC Hockey	22	8	11	3	–	–	–	19	7th	34	15	16	3	.485	Won First round series, 2–1 (Colgate); Lost Quarterfinal series, 0–2 (Union)	
2017–18	ECAC Hockey	22	10	10	2	–	–	–	22	7th	36	19	13	4	.583	Won First round series, 2–0 (Brown); Won Quarterfinal series, 2–0 (Union); Won Semifinal, 4–1 (Cornell); Won Championship 2–1 (OT) (Clarkson)	Lost Regional semifinal, 2–4 (Ohio State)
2018–19	ECAC Hockey	22	8	12	2	–	–	–	18	9th	31	10	18	3	.371	Lost First round series, 0–2 (Brown)	
2019–20	ECAC Hockey	22	2	16	4	–	–	–	8	11th	31	6	20	5	.274	Won First round series, 2–0 (Dartmouth); Tournament Cancelled	
2020–21	ECAC Hockey	Season Cancelled															
2021–22	ECAC Hockey	22	7	14	1	0	1	0	23	10th	31	8	21	2	.290	Lost First round series, 0–2 (Union)	
2022–23	ECAC Hockey	22	8	14	0	2	1	0	26	T–7th	32	13	19	0	.406	Won First round, 6–4 (Union); Lost Quarterfinal series, 0–2 (Harvard)	
2023–24	ECAC Hockey	22	8	11	3	4	0	2	25	T–9th	30	10	16	4	.400	Lost First round, 0–1 (Harvard)	
Ben Syer (2024–Present)
2024–25	ECAC Hockey	22	7	12	3	2	2	1	25	9th	30	12	15	3	.450	Lost First round, 2–3 (Brown)	
Totals											GP	W	L	T	%	Championships	
Regular Season											2543	997	1392	154	.422	1 Quadrangular Championship, 1 Pentagonal Championship	
Conference Post-season											104	37	65	2	.365	3 ECAC tournament championships	
NCAA Post-season											4	0	4	0	.000	4 NCAA Tournament appearances	
Regular Season and Post-season Record											2651	1034	1461	156	.419		

* Winning percentage is used when conference schedules are unbalanced.
