= 2001 ECAC Hockey men's ice hockey tournament =

2001 ECAC Men's ice hockey tournament
- Dates: March 9–17, 2001
- Teams: 10
- Finals site: Olympic Arena; Lake Placid, New York
- Champions: St. Lawrence (6th title)
- Winning coach: Joe Marsh (5th title)
- MVP: Jeremy Symington (St. Lawrence)
- ECAC Men's Ice Hockey Tournaments

The 2001 ECAC Hockey Men's Ice Hockey Tournament was the 40th tournament in league history. It was played between March 9 and March 17, 2001. Quarterfinal games were played at home team campus sites, while the final five games were played at the Olympic Arena (subsequently renamed Herb Brooks Arena) in Lake Placid, New York. By winning the tournament, St. Lawrence received the ECAC's automatic bid to the 2001 NCAA Division I Men's Ice Hockey Tournament.

== Format ==
The tournament featured three rounds of play. The two teams that finish below tenth place in the standings are not eligible for tournament play. In the first round, the first and tenth seeds, the second and ninth seeds, the third seed and eighth seeds, the fourth seed and seventh seeds and the fifth seed and sixth seeds played a best-of-three series with the three highest-seeded winners advancing to the semifinals and the remaining two winners playing in the Four vs. Five matchup. After the opening round every series becomes a single-elimination game. In the semifinals, the highest seed plays the winner of the four vs. five game while the two remaining teams play with the winners advancing to the championship game and the losers advancing to the third place game. The tournament champion receives an automatic bid to the 2001 NCAA Men's Division I Ice Hockey Tournament.

== Conference standings ==
Note: GP = Games played; W = Wins; L = Losses; T = Ties; PTS = Points; GF = Goals For; GA = Goals Against

2000–01 ECAC Hockey standings
| | Conference | | | | | | | Overall | | | | | |
| | GP | W | L | T | PTS | GF | GA | GP | W | L | T | GF | GA |
|---|---|---|---|---|---|---|---|---|---|---|---|---|---|
| #15 Clarkson† | 22 | 15 | 5 | 2 | 32 | 81 | 45 | 35 | 21 | 11 | 3 | 123 | 91 |
| #10 St. Lawrence* | 22 | 13 | 6 | 3 | 29 | 83 | 70 | 37 | 20 | 13 | 4 | 127 | 120 |
| Harvard | 22 | 12 | 8 | 2 | 26 | 68 | 60 | 33 | 16 | 15 | 2 | 103 | 105 |
| Cornell | 22 | 11 | 8 | 3 | 25 | 44 | 44 | 33 | 16 | 12 | 5 | 73 | 72 |
| Dartmouth | 22 | 10 | 8 | 4 | 24 | 67 | 62 | 34 | 16 | 14 | 4 | 101 | 96 |
| Rensselaer | 22 | 11 | 9 | 2 | 24 | 62 | 54 | 34 | 17 | 15 | 2 | 107 | 89 |
| Princeton | 22 | 9 | 9 | 4 | 22 | 70 | 66 | 31 | 10 | 16 | 5 | 90 | 103 |
| Yale | 22 | 10 | 11 | 1 | 21 | 72 | 80 | 31 | 14 | 16 | 1 | 105 | 114 |
| Union | 22 | 8 | 12 | 2 | 18 | 54 | 75 | 34 | 12 | 18 | 4 | 88 | 115 |
| Vermont | 22 | 8 | 12 | 2 | 18 | 68 | 69 | 34 | 14 | 18 | 2 | 116 | 110 |
| Colgate | 22 | 8 | 13 | 1 | 17 | 60 | 67 | 34 | 10 | 20 | 4 | 95 | 112 |
| Brown | 22 | 2 | 16 | 4 | 8 | 43 | 80 | 29 | 4 | 21 | 4 | 63 | 107 |
Championship: St. Lawrence † indicates conference regular season champion * indicates conference tournament champion (Whitelaw Cup); Final rankings: USA Today/American Hockey Magazine Poll Top 15 Poll

== Bracket ==
Teams are reseeded after the First Round

First Round; March 9–11
1 | Clarkson | 3 | 3** | 2
10 | Vermont | 5 | 2 | 3*
2 | St. Lawrence | 6 | 4 | —
9 | Union | 3 | 2 | —
3 | Harvard | 5 | 7 | —
8 | Yale | 4 | 4 | —
4 | Cornell | 3* | 2 | —
7 | Princeton | 2 | 1 | —
5 | Dartmouth | 4 | 5 | —
6 | Rensselaer | 2 | 1 | —

Four vs. Five; March 15
5 | Dartmouth | 3*
10 | Vermont | 2

Semifinals; March 16
2 | St. Lawrence | 2
5 | Dartmouth | 0
3 | Harvard | 2
4 | Cornell | 5

Championship; March 17
2 | St. Lawrence | 3
4 | Cornell | 1

Note: * denotes overtime period(s)

=== First round ===
==== (1) Clarkson vs. (10) Vermont ====
| March 9 | Clarkson | 3 – 5 | Vermont | Cheel Arena | Recap |
| Trevor Edwards - 04:03 | | First period | 13:39 - PP - Bryson Busniuk; 14:43 - Graham Mink |
| Murray Kuntz - 02:55; Rob McFeeters - PP - 07:30 | | Second period | 01:53 - Graham Mink; 03:27 - GW PP - Jeff Miles |
| No scoring | | Third period | 19:24 - Mike Torney |
| Mike Walsh ( 17 saves / 21 shots ) | | Goalie stats | Shawn Conschafter ( 27 saves / 30 shots ) |

| March 10 | Clarkson | 3 – 2 | 2OT | Vermont | Cheel Arena | Recap |
| Jean Desrochers - 16:46 | | First period | | No scoring |
| Mike Nagai - 02:42 | | Second period | | No scoring |
| No scoring | | Third period | | 12:25 - Jeff Miles; 14:21 - Ryan Cox |
| Rob McFeeters - GW - 19:53 | | Second overtime period | | No scoring |
| Mike Walsh ( 34 saves / 36 shots ) | | Goalie stats | | Shawn Conschafter ( 40 saves / 43 shots ) |

| March 11 | Clarkson | 2 – 3 | OT | Vermont | Cheel Arena | Recap |
| Kent Huskins - 13:08 | | First period | | No scoring |
| No scoring | | Second period | | No scoring |
| David Evans - PP - 08:43 | | Third period | | 04:57 - PP - Andreas Moborg; 06:44 - PP - Graham Mink |
| No scoring | | First overtime period | | 09:04 - GW - Patrick Sharp |
| Mike Walsh ( 19 saves / 21 shots ) / Karl Mattson ( 12 saves / 13 shots ) | | Goalie stats | | Shawn Conschafter ( 39 saves / 41 shots ) |

| Vermont won series 2–1 |

==== (2) St. Lawrence vs. (9) Union ====
| March 9 | St. Lawrence | 6 – 3 | Union | Appleton Arena | Recap |
| Robin Carruthers - 01:08; Erik Anderson - PP - 05:18 | | First period | 17:39 - PP - Jeff Wilson |
| Erik Anderson - 15:05; Al Fyfe - GW PP - 18:01 | | Second period | 16:21 - PP - Jordy Federko |
| Ryan Glenn - 13:49; Jim Lorentz - 16:44 | | Third period | 15:49 - PP - Jordy Federko |
| Jeremy Symington ( 20 saves / 23 shots ) | | Goalie stats | Brandon Snee ( 34 saves / 40 shots ) |

| March 10 | St. Lawrence | 4 – 2 | Union | Appleton Arena | Recap |
| No Scoring | | First period | No scoring |
| Charlie Daniels - PP - 03:27; Mike Gellard - PP - 15:35 | | Second period | 05:15 - Alex Todd |
| Russ Bartlett - GW PP - 00:54; Jim Lorentz - 08:40 | | Third period | 17:50 - Jordy Federko |
| Jeremy Symington ( 26 saves / 30 shots ) | | Goalie stats | Brandon Snee ( 30 saves / 32 shots ) |

| St. Lawrence won series 2–0 |

==== (3) Harvard vs. (8) Yale ====
| March 9 | Harvard | 5 – 4 | Yale | Bright Hockey Center | Recap |
| Tim Pettit - 08:43; Steve Moore - PP - 19:48 | | First period | 05:55 - Jeff Hamilton |
| Harry Schwefel - PP - 04:33; Dennis Packard - 05:30; Ken Turano - GW PP - 13:36 | | Second period | 01:00 - Nick Deschenes; 05:51 - Jason Noe; 19:42 - PP - Luke Earl |
| No scoring | | Third period | No scoring |
| Oliver Jonas ( 37 saves / 41 shots ) | | Goalie stats | Dan Lombard ( 21 saves / 26 shots ) |

| March 10 | Harvard | 7 – 4 | Yale | Bright Hockey Center | Recap |
| Ken Turano - 02:42; Tyler Kolarik - PP - 17:48 | | First period | 00:16 - Luke Earl |
| Brett Nowak - 10:24 | | Second period | 08:49 - Vin Hellemeyer; 14:48 - PP - Nick Deschenes |
| Brett Nowak - 07:59; Steve Moore - GW PP - 08:50; Dennis Packard - 10:13; Dominic Moore - PP - 13:47 | | Third period | 04:02 - PP - Ben Stafford |
| Oliver Jonas ( 23 saves / 27 shots ) | | Goalie stats | Dan Lombard ( 29 saves / 36 shots ) |

| Harvard won series 2–0 |

==== (4) Cornell vs. (7) Princeton ====
| March 9 | Cornell | 3 – 2 | OT | Princeton | Lynah Rink | Recap |
| No Scoring | | First period | | No scoring |
| No scoring | | Second period | | No scoring |
| Ryan Vesce - PP - 04:28; Ryan Vesce - PP - 11:21 | | Third period | | 00:26 - David Schneider; 01:24 - Shane Campbell |
| David Kozier - GW - 07:25 | | First overtime period | | No scoring |
| Matt Underhill ( 27 saves / 29 shots ) | | Goalie stats | | Dave Stathos ( 31 saves / 34 shots ) |

| March 10 | Cornell | 2 – 1 | Princeton | Lynah Rink | Recap |
| Denis Ladouceur - 13:13 | | First period | No scoring |
| Sam Paolini - GW PP - 02:32 | | Second period | 12:15 - Shane Campbell |
| No scoring | | Third period | No scoring |
| Matt Underhill ( 31 saves / 32 shots ) | | Goalie stats | Dave Stathos ( 35 saves / 37 shots ) |

| Cornell won series 2–0 |

==== (5) Dartmouth vs. (6) Rensselaer ====
| March 9 | Dartmouth | 4 – 2 | Rensselaer | Thompson Arena | Recap |
| Christopher Baldwin - PP - 19:48 | | First period | 00:39 - Matt Murley; 11:31 - PP - Danny Eberly |
| Peter Mahler - 10:06; Jamie Herrington - GW - 10:40 | | Second period | No scoring |
| Christopher Baldwin - EN - 19:15 | | Third period | No scoring |
| Nick Boucher ( 38 saves / 40 shots ) | | Goalie stats | Nathan Marsters ( 36 saves / 39 shots ) |

| March 10 | Dartmouth | 5 – 1 | Rensselaer | Thompson Arena | Recap |
| Christopher Baldwin - 05:02 | | First period | No scoring |
| Chris Taliercio - GW PP - 08:06; Mike Maturo - 14:36; Dan Casella - SH - 19:35 | | Second period | No scoring |
| Jason Costa - 15:55 | | Third period | 12:49 - Conrad Barnes |
| Nick Boucher ( 17 saves / 18 shots ) | | Goalie stats | Nathan Marsters ( 51 saves / 56 shots ) |

| Dartmouth won series 2–0 |

=== Four vs. Five ===
==== (5) Dartmouth vs. (10) Vermont ====
| March 15 | Dartmouth | 3 – 2 | OT | Vermont | Olympic Arena | Recap |
| No Scoring | | First period | | 12:41 - Andreas Moborg |
| Mike Turner - PP - 12:20 | | Second period | | 02:30 - Martin Wilde |
| Kent Gillings - EA - 19:46 | | Third period | | No scoring |
| Mike Maturo - GW - 07:40 | | First overtime period | | No scoring |
| Nick Boucher ( 32 saves / 34 shots ) | | Goalie stats | | Shawn Conschafter ( 33 saves / 36 shots ) |

=== Semifinals ===
==== (2) St. Lawrence vs. (5) Dartmouth ====
| March 16 | St. Lawrence | 2 – 0 | Dartmouth | Olympic Arena | Recap |
| No Scoring | | First period | No scoring |
| Robin Carruthers - GW PP - 01:28 | | Second period | No scoring |
| Robin Carruthers - 06:39 | | Third period | No scoring |
| Jeremy Symington ( 42 saves / 42 shots ) | | Goalie stats | Nick Boucher ( 22 saves / 24 shots ) |

==== (3) Harvard vs. (4) Cornell ====
| March 16 | Harvard | 2 – 5 | Cornell | Olympic Arena | Recap |
| No Scoring | | First period | No scoring |
| Tyler Kolarik - 17:15 | | Second period | 02:16 - PP - Sam Paolini; 03:18 - David Francis; 04:53 - Stephen Bâby |
| Chris Bala - 18:14 | | Third period | 06:16 - David Francis; 17:05 - EN - Ben Wallace |
| Oliver Jonas ( 20 saves / 24 shots ) | | Goalie stats | Matt Underhill ( 45 saves / 47 shots ) |

=== Third place ===
==== (3) Harvard vs. (5) Dartmouth ====
| March 17 | Harvard | 3 – 2 | OT | Dartmouth | Olympic Arena | Recap |
| Dennis Packard - PP - 10:30 | | First period | | No scoring |
| Tyler Kolarik - 12:26 | | Second period | | 09:50 - Jamie Herrington |
| No scoring | | Third period | | 11:27 - PP - Mike Murray |
| Dominic Moore - GW - 01:32 | | First overtime period | | No scoring |
| Oliver Jonas ( 32 saves / 34 shots ) | | Goalie stats | | Nick Boucher ( 33 saves / 36 shots ) |

=== Championship ===
==== (2) St. Lawrence vs. (4) Cornell ====
| March 17 | St. Lawrence | 3 – 1 | Cornell | Olympic Arena | Recap |
| Russ Bartlett - 09:32 | | First period | No scoring |
| Blair Clarance - GW - 03:28 | | Second period | No scoring |
| Al Fyfe - EN - 17:24 | | Third period | 18:54 - EA - David Kozier |
| Jeremy Symington ( 31 saves / 32 shots ) | | Goalie stats | Matt Underhill ( 19 saves / 21 shots ) |

== Tournament awards ==
=== All-Tournament Team ===
- F David Francois (Cornell)
- F Blair Clarance (St. Lawrence)
- F Tyler Kolarik (Harvard)
- D Matt Desrosiers (St. Lawrence)
- D Douglas Murray (Cornell)
- G Jeremy Symington* (St. Lawrence)

* Most Outstanding Player(s)
