= Eric Heffler =

American ice hockey player

- Born: February 29, 1976 (age 50) Geneva, New York, USA
- Height: 6 ft 3 in (191 cm)
- Weight: 190 lb (86 kg; 13 st 8 lb)
- Position: Goaltender
- Caught: Right
- Played for: Hamilton Bulldogs; Greensboro Generals; New Haven Knights; B.C. Icemen
- Playing career: 1995–2002

Eric Heffler (born February 29, 1976) is an American former ice hockey goaltender who was an All-American for St. Lawrence.

== Career ==
After playing junior hockey in Canada, Heffler returned to New York to play college hockey at St. Lawrence. He started his career as the team's third goaltender and then progressively earned more playing time in net. He became the primary netminder as a junior and then backstopped the team to a massive improvement as a senior. St. Lawrence won more than twice as many games in Heffler's final season and he was one of the top goaltenders in the nation in both goals against average and save percentage. St. Lawrence finished second in the ECAC Hockey standings and was ranked #10 in the country while Hellfer was named an All-American and the ECAC Hockey Player of the Year. He helped the team earn an NCAA Tournament bid for the first time in seven years but, unfortunately, couldn't help them win the match.

Though undrafted, Heffler embarked on a professional career after graduating and quickly found himself in the NHL. The next year, when Edmonton's primary netminder, Bill Ranford, contracted an ear infection, Heffler was called up to serve as a backup behind Tommy Salo. He sat on the bench for two games in late-November before Ranford returned to action. Heffler would later joke about the situation:

“I was hoping to get home for Thanksgiving, but this is a good reason not too.”

In the AHL, Heffler was the co-starter for the Hamilton Bulldogs and had a mediocre season. While his numbers weren't any worse than any other of the team's goaltenders, he was relegated to being the team's third goaltender during their playoff run. In his second full season of pro hockey, Heffler's performance declined, but he still earned a second call-up to the Oilers, this time for one game. Afterwards he slid down the depth chart and was eventually demoted to the ECHL. In the second half of the season he didn't appear to be improving, so Heffler ended up playing single-A hockey the year after. He split time between two teams and retired after the year.

Heffler was inducted into the St. Lawrence Athletic Hall of Fame in 2019.

== Statistics ==
=== Regular season and playoffs ===
			Regular season									Playoffs
Season	Team	League	GP	W	L	T	MIN	GA	SO	GAA	SV%	GP	W	L	MIN	GA	SO	GAA	SV%
1994–95	Oshawa Legionaires	MetJHL	29	—	—	—	—	—	—	—	—	—	—	—	—	—	—	—	—
1995–96	St. Lawrence	ECAC Hockey	4	0	0	0	55	3	0	3.27	.864	—	—	—	—	—	—	—	—
1996–97	St. Lawrence	ECAC Hockey	12	2	3	1	458	31	0	4.06	.886	—	—	—	—	—	—	—	—
1997–98	St. Lawrence	ECAC Hockey	26	8	14	0	1529	73	2	2.90	.917	—	—	—	—	—	—	—	—
1998–99	St. Lawrence	ECAC Hockey	37	22	12	3	1185	88	0	2.39	.931	—	—	—	—	—	—	—	—
1998–99	Hamilton Bulldogs	AHL	2	1	1	0	119	5	0	2.52	.939	—	—	—	—	—	—	—	—
1999–00	Hamilton Bulldogs	AHL	47	11	25	7	2643	138	5	3.13	.910	—	—	—	—	—	—	—	—
2000–01	Hamilton Bulldogs	AHL	19	5	11	0	1037	68	0	3.93	.891	—	—	—	—	—	—	—	—
2000–01	Greensboro Generals	ECHL	15	4	10	0	821	55	0	4.02	.894	—	—	—	—	—	—	—	—
2001–02	New Haven Knights	UHL	10	4	5	1	601	32	1	3.20	.896	—	—	—	—	—	—	—	—
2001–02	B.C. Icemen	UHL	9	4	3	1	421	19	0	2.71	.929	—	—	—	—	—	—	—	—
NCAA totals			79	32	29	4	4,248	195	2	2.75	.920	—	—	—	—	—	—	—	—
UHL totals			19	8	8	2	1,022	51	1	2.99	.911	—	—	—	—	—	—	—	—
AHL totals			68	17	37	7	3,799	211	5	3.33	.906	—	—	—	—	—	—	—	—

== Awards and honors ==
Award	Year
All-ECAC Hockey First Team	1998–99
AHCA East First-Team All-American	1998–99
ECAC Hockey All-Tournament Team	1999

Awards and achievements
Preceded by Alex Westlund	Ken Dryden Award; 1998–99	Succeeded by Joel Laing
Preceded by Raymond Giroux	ECAC Hockey Player of the Year; 1998–99	Succeeded by Andy McDonald
