= Ray DiLauro =

American ice hockey player (born 1979)

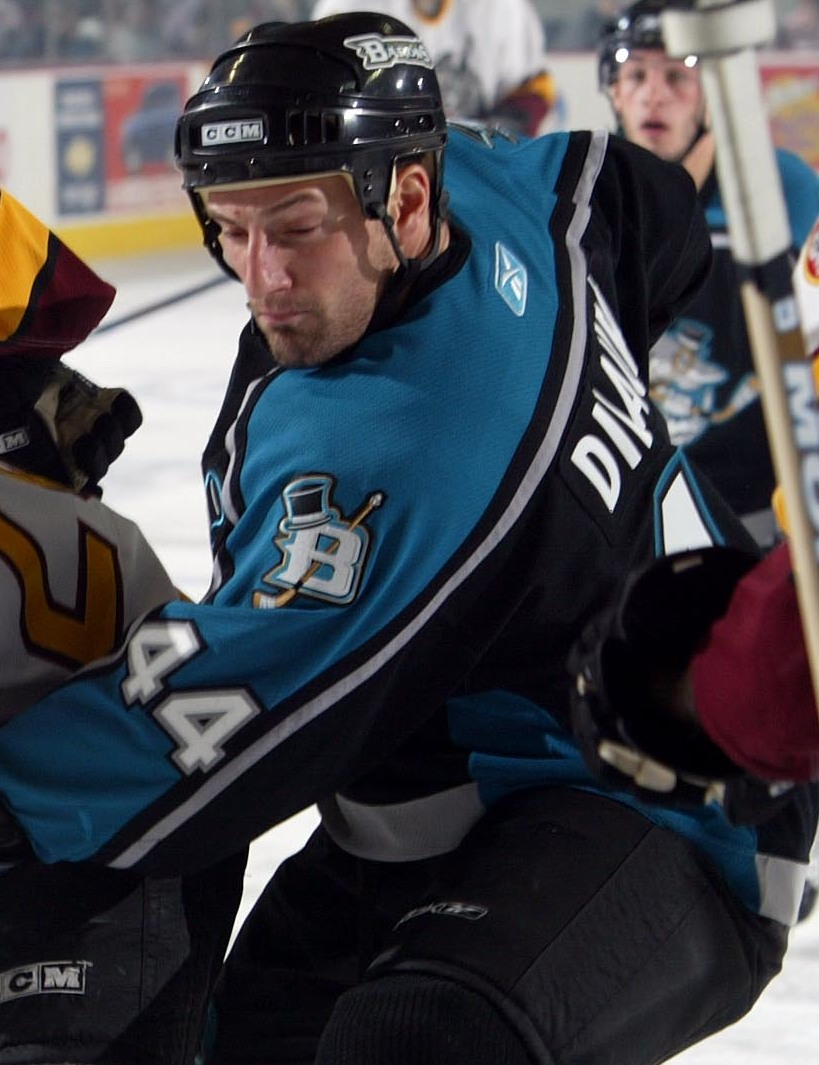
- DiLauro with the Cleveland Barons in 2006
- Born: July 13, 1979 (age 46) Bensalem, Pennsylvania, U.S.
- Height: 6 ft 2 in (188 cm)
- Weight: 225 lb (102 kg; 16 st 1 lb)
- Position: Defense
- Shot: Left
- Played for: AHL; Cleveland Barons; Wilkes-Barre/Scranton Penguins; Springfield Falcons; Manchester Monarchs; Binghamton Senators; ECHL; Trenton Titans; Fresno Falcons; Wheeling Nailers; Columbus Cottonmouths; Reading Royals; CHL; Missouri Mavericks; DEL; Füchse Duisburg; Krefeld Pinguine; Austria; EHC Linz; Serie A HC Bolzano; ALH; Nippon Paper Cranes
- NHL draft: 246th overall, 1999; Atlanta Thrashers
- Playing career: 2002–2012

Ray DiLauro (born July 13, 1979) is an American former professional ice hockey defenseman. He was selected by the Atlanta Thrashers in the 9th round (246th overall) of the 1999 NHL entry draft.

== Career ==
After playing Youth Hockey for the Philadelphia Glaciers and Tier III Junior "A" Ice Hockey for the Philadelphia Little Flyers, DiLauro played High School Ice Hockey for the National Sports Academy in Lake Placid, New York.

DiLauro then attended St. Lawrence University where he played four seasons of NCAA Division I Ice Hockey with the Saint Lawrence Saints from 1998-2002. While at St. Lawrence, DiLauro served as an Alternate Captain during the 2001-02 season, won the 2002 Pete McGeough Award as the team's outstanding Defenseman, and won both the 2000 ECAC Championship and the 2001 ECAC Championship.

During his Professional Ice Hockey career, DiLauro played in the American Hockey League with the Cleveland Barons, Wilkes-Barre Scranton Penguins, Springfield Falcons, Manchester Monarchs, and Binghamton Senators. He also played in the ECHL for the Trenton Titans, Fresno Falcons, Wheeling Nailers, Columbus Cottonmouths, and Reading Royals. In addition, he played in the Central Hockey League for the Missouri Mavericks, the German Deutsche Eishockey Liga for Füchse Duisburg and Krefeld Pinguine, the Austrian Hockey League for EHC Linz, the Italian Serie A for HC Bolzano, and in Asia League Ice Hockey for the Japanese club Nippon Paper Cranes.

For the 2013–14 season, DiLauro joined the Philadelphia Revolution Ice Hockey organization. With the Revolution, he served as Head Coach of the organizations's U16 team which competed in the Eastern Junior Elite Prospects League, and also as a coach for the organization's Pee Wee team competing in the Full Check Hockey League.

== Career statistics ==
			Regular season					Playoffs
Season	Team	League	GP	G	A	Pts	PIM	GP	G	A	Pts	PIM
1998–99	St. Lawrence University	NCAA	35	4	8	12	12	—	—	—	—	—
1999–00	St. Lawrence University	NCAA	37	3	9	12	22	—	—	—	—	—
2000–01	St. Lawrence University	NCAA	34	3	11	14	28	—	—	—	—	—
2001–02	St. Lawrence University	NCAA	34	3	15	18	18	—	—	—	—	—
2001–02	Reading Royals	ECHL	3	0	2	2	2	—	—	—	—	—
2001–02	Springfield Falcons	AHL	3	0	0	0	0	—	—	—	—	—
2002–03	Reading Royals	ECHL	53	7	14	21	47	—	—	—	—	—
2002–03	Binghamton Senators	AHL	4	0	0	0	2	—	—	—	—	—
2002–03	Manchester Monarchs	AHL	1	0	0	0	0	—	—	—	—	—
2002–03	Springfield Falcons	AHL	4	0	1	1	2	—	—	—	—	—
2003–04	Columbus Cottonmouths	ECHL	52	9	15	24	31	—	—	—	—	—
2004–05	Wheeling Nailers	ECHL	72	12	40	52	82	—	—	—	—	—
2004–05	Wilkes-Barre/Scranton Penguins	AHL	1	0	0	0	0	—	—	—	—	—
2005–06	Cleveland Barons	AHL	49	5	19	24	33	—	—	—	—	—
2005–06	Fresno Falcons	ECHL	5	0	0	0	0	14	1	9	10	6
2006–07	Krefeld Pinguine	DEL	51	2	11	13	85	2	1	1	2	4
2007–08	Füchse Duisburg	DEL	55	7	18	25	98	—	—	—	—	—
2008–09	EHC Linz	Austria	48	7	20	27	74	10	1	2	3	26
2009–10	HC Bolzano	Italy	32	3	10	13	32	10	0	4	4	12
2010–11	Missouri Mavericks	CHL	65	10	29	39	75	9	3	6	9	6
2011–12	Nippon Paper Cranes	Asia League	19	3	8	11	20	—	—	—	—	—
2011–12	Trenton Titans	ECHL	48	9	20	29	51	—	—	—	—	—
2012–13	Trenton Titans	ECHL	19	2	5	7	14	—	—	—	—	—
AHL totals			62	5	20	25	37	—	—	—	—	—
ECHL totals			252	39	96	135	227	14	1	9	10	6
DEL totals			106	9	29	38	183	2	1	1	2	4

== Awards and honors ==
Award	Year
All-ECAC Hockey Rookie Team	1998–99
Pete McGeough Award (Saint Lawrence Saints' outstanding Defenseman)	2001-02
ECAC Tournament Champion	1999-00, 2000-01
ECHL Defenseman of the Year	2004–05
ECHL First All-Star Team	2004–05
