= Justin Harney =

American ice hockey player (born 1977)

- Born: November 14, 1977 (age 48) Hopkinton, Massachusetts, USA
- Height: 6 ft 2 in (188 cm)
- Weight: 188 lb (85 kg; 13 st 6 lb)
- Position: Defenseman
- Shot: Right
- Played for: Wheeling Nailers; Charlotte Checkers; Cincinnati Mighty Ducks; Wilkes-Barre/Scranton Penguins; Lowell Lock Monsters; Saint John Flames; Iserlohn Roosters; ERC Ingolstadt; Kassel Huskies
- Playing career: 1996–2007

Justin Harney (born November 14, 1977) is an American former ice hockey defenseman who was an All-American for St. Lawrence.

== Career ==
Harney's college career began in the fall of 1996 and he began playing full-time for St. Lawrence as a freshman. As an underclassman, Harney provided steady production from the blueline but he was unable to help the Saints win many games. Things changed during his junior year; Harney's offensive numbers more than doubled while SLU won more than twice as many games as the year before. Harney helped the Larries reach the ECAC Hockey championship game and earn a bid to the NCAA Tournament for the first time since 1992. As a senior, Harney was named team captain and led the Saints to one of their best seasons in history. While his offensive numbers declined slightly, Harney led the team to a first place finish in the conference standings and then won the 2000 ECAC championship. St. Lawrence received the second eastern seed and were advanced into the national quarterfinals. They faced down Boston University in an epic 4-overtime match and won the game to send the Saints into just their second Frozen Four over the previous 38 seasons. The team's run ended in the national semifinals with Harney being named an All-American for the year.

After graduating, Harney signed professionally with the Pittsburgh Penguins' organization but ended his first year in the Anaheim Mighty Ducks farm system. By the end of his second season as a pro, Harney had spent time with six different teams. He decided to head to Europe for his third season and spend the succeeding five years playing in Germany. Harney retired in 2007.

A year after ending his playing career, Harney began attending the F.W. Olin Graduate School of Business at Babson College. After graduating in 2010, he became the director of Sales and Marketing for Professional Nursing Placement Services. As of 2021, he continues to work in the same position.

== Personal life ==
Both of Justin's older brothers played college hockey as well. Joe, for Boston College, and Jake for St. Lawrence.

== Statistics ==
=== Regular season and playoffs ===
			Regular Season					Playoffs
Season	Team	League	GP	G	A	Pts	PIM	GP	G	A	Pts	PIM
1995–96	Omaha Lancers	USHL	—	—	—	—	—	—	—	—	—	—
1996–97	St. Lawrence	ECAC Hockey	35	0	14	14	38	—	—	—	—	—
1997–98	St. Lawrence	ECAC Hockey	33	2	10	12	58	—	—	—	—	—
1998–99	St. Lawrence	ECAC Hockey	38	5	21	26	48	—	—	—	—	—
1999–00	St. Lawrence	ECAC Hockey	37	4	18	22	77	—	—	—	—	—
2000–01	Wheeling Nailers	ECHL	34	7	13	20	43	—	—	—	—	—
2000–01	Wilkes-Barre/Scranton Penguins	AHL	14	0	1	1	12	—	—	—	—	—
2000–01	Cincinnati Mighty Ducks	AHL	5	0	1	1	0	—	—	—	—	—
2000–01	Charlotte Checkers	ECHL	23	3	10	13	18	5	0	1	1	2
2001–02	Lowell Lock Monsters	AHL	10	0	2	2	4	—	—	—	—	—
2001–02	Lowell Lock Monsters	AHL	11	0	1	1	4	—	—	—	—	—
2001–02	Charlotte Checkers	ECHL	55	6	36	42	66	3	0	0	0	4
2002–03	Iserlohn Roosters	DEL	50	4	25	29	144	—	—	—	—	—
2003–04	ERC Ingolstadt	DEL	44	3	8	11	66	9	0	3	3	34
2004–05	ERC Ingolstadt	DEL	47	2	9	11	94	2	0	0	0	0
2005–06	Kassel Huskies	DEL	47	9	12	21	115	5	2	4	6	6
2006–07	Kassel Huskies	Bundesliga	51	6	13	19	82	10	2	4	6	22
NCAA totals			143	11	63	74	221	—	—	—	—	—
ECHL totals			112	16	59	75	127	8	0	1	1	6
AHL totals			40	0	5	5	20	—	—	—	—	—
DEL totals			188	18	54	72	419	16	2	7	9	40

== Awards and honors ==
Award	Year
ECAC Hockey All-Tournament Team	1999, 2000
All-ECAC Hockey First Team	1999–00
AHCA East First-Team All-American	1999–00

Awards and achievements
Preceded by Jeff Burgoyne	ECAC Hockey Best Defensive Defenseman; 1999–00	Succeeded by Kent Huskins
