= Ken Dryden Award =

American hockey award

- Sport: Ice hockey
- Awarded for: The Best Goaltender in ECAC Hockey during the regular season

History
- First award: 1996
- Most recent: Alexis Cournoyer

The Ken Dryden Award is an annual award given out at the conclusion of the ECAC Hockey regular season to the best goaltender in the conference as voted by the coaches of each ECAC team.

The Ken Dryden Award was first awarded in 1996 and every year thereafter. It is named in honor of famed Cornell goaltender Ken Dryden who led the Big Red to their first National Title in 1967.

== Award winners ==
Year	Winner	School
1995–96	Tim Thomas	Vermont
1996–97	Trevor Koenig	Union
1997–98	Alex Westlund	Yale
1998–99	Eric Heffler	St. Lawrence
1999–00	Joel Laing	Rensselaer
2000–01	Oliver Jonas	Harvard
2001–02	Matt Underhill	Cornell
2002–03	David LeNeveu	Cornell
2003–04	Yann Danis	Brown
2004–05	David McKee	Cornell
2005–06	Mark Dekanich	Colgate
2006–07	David Leggio	Clarkson
2007–08	Kyle Richter	Harvard
2008–09	Zane Kalemba	Princeton
2009–10	Ben Scrivens	Cornell
2010–11	Keith Kinkaid	Union

Year	Winner	School
2011–12	Troy Grosenick	Union
2012–13	Eric Hartzell	Quinnipiac
2013–14	Colin Stevens	Union
2014–15	Alex Lyon	Yale
2015–16	Alex Lyon	Yale
2016–17	Kyle Hayton	St. Lawrence
2017–18	Matthew Galajda	Cornell
2018–19	Andrew Shortridge	Quinnipiac
2019–20	Frank Marotte	Clarkson
2020–21	Keith Petruzelli	Quinnipiac
2021–22	Yaniv Perets	Quinnipiac
2022–23	Yaniv Perets	Quinnipiac
2023–24	Ian Shane	Cornell
2024–25	Ethan Langenegger	Clarkson
2025–26	Alexis Cournoyer	Cornell

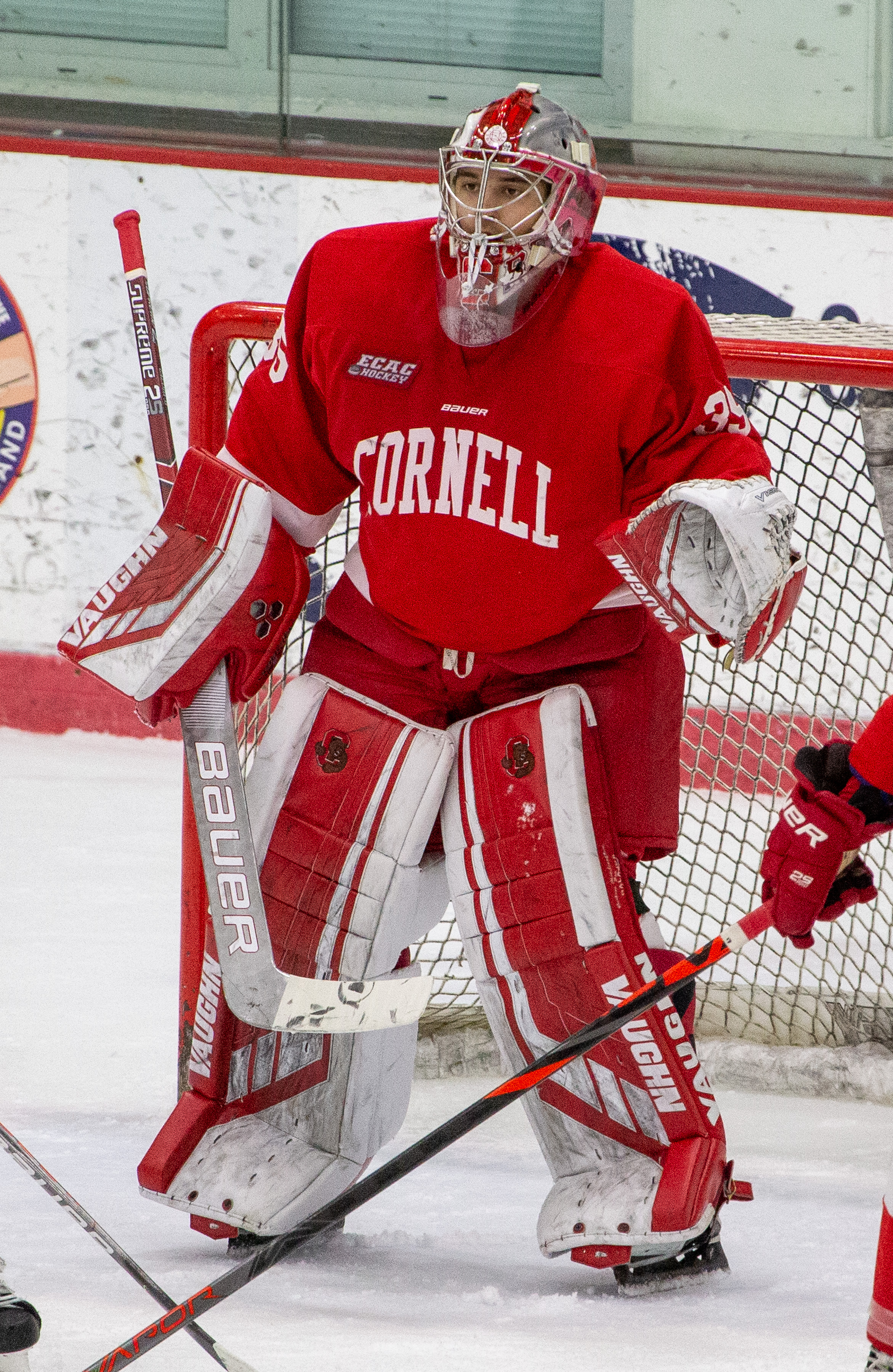
Matthew Galajda
2017–18 winner

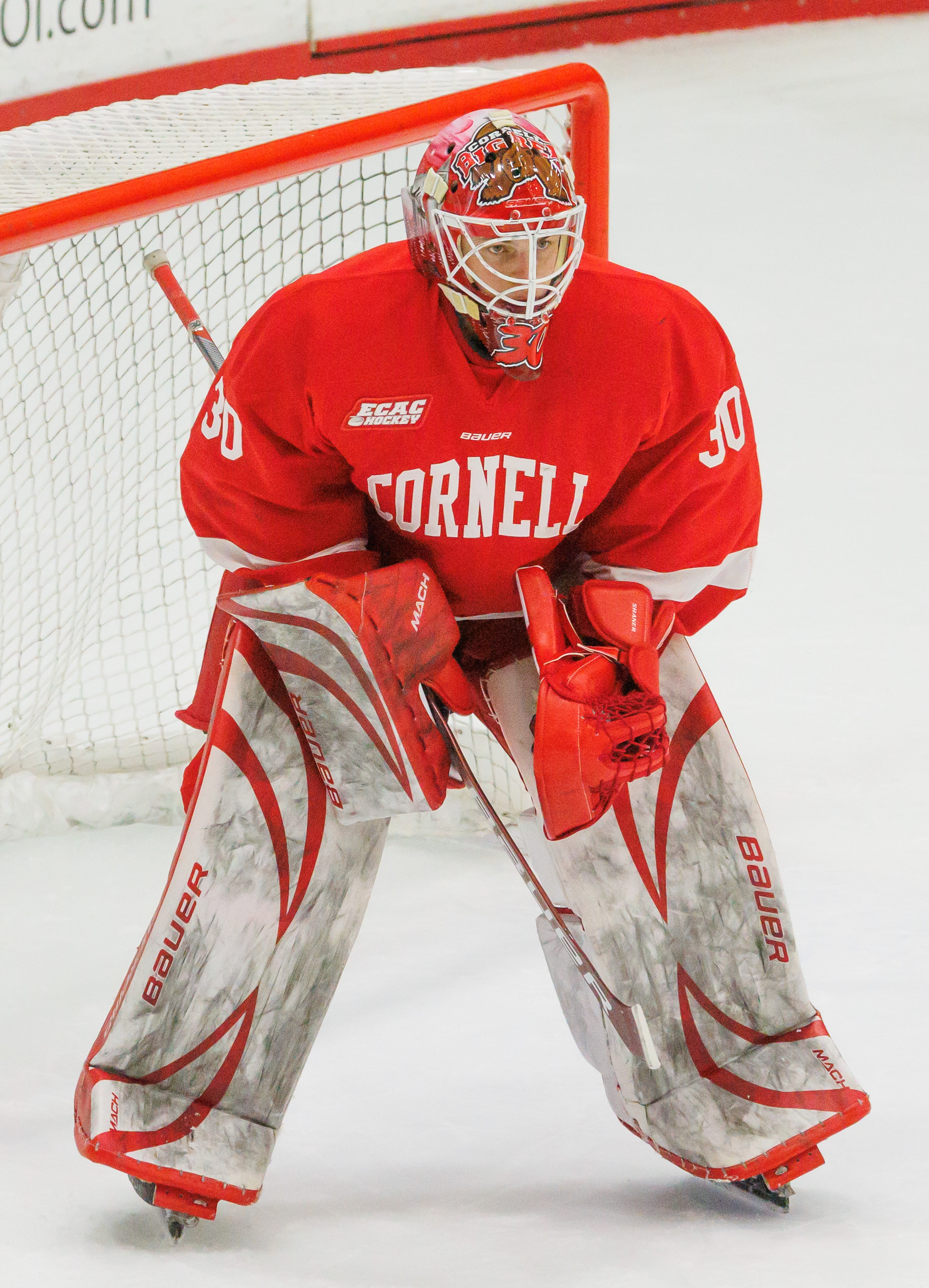
Ian Shane
2023–24 winner

=== Winners by school ===
School	Winners
Cornell	7
Quinnipiac	5
Union	4
Clarkson	3
Yale	3
Harvard	2
St. Lawrence	2
Brown	1
Colgate	1
Princeton	1
Rensselaer	1
Vermont	1

== See also ==
- ECAC Hockey Awards
