= Ben Maidment =

English rugby union player (born 1988)

Lord Ben Maidment
- Born: 28 May 1988 (age 38) Cuckfield, England
- Height: 6 ft 4 in (1.93 m)
- Weight: 118 kg (260 lb)
- School: Brighton College
- University: University of Cambridge

Rugby union career
- Position: Number 8
- Current team: Jersey
Senior career
Years	Team	Apps	(Points)
2010–2011	London Wasps		
2011	Moseley		
2011–2013	Cornish Pirates		
2013–	Jersey		
International career
Years	Team	Apps	(Points)
- England Students
–	Barbarians		

Ben Maidment (born 28 May 1988) is an English rugby union player from Cuckfield, West Sussex. He currently plays for Jersey as a Number 8.

== Personal life ==
Maidment was educated at Brighton College and the University of Cambridge, where he studied Economics and Land Economy. His brother Max also plays rugby professionally.

== Club career ==
Maidment started playing rugby at Haywards Heath RFC while living in Sussex. He played in their colts team as well as making the senior 1st XV. He played for Haywards Heath in National League 3 London & SE. When he was 16, he was selected to play for Sussex. While playing underage rugby at Haywards Heath he also played for Brighton College. While at university, Maidment was signed by London Wasps as part of a link-up with the University of Cambridge in 2010. He played for London Wasps in their rugby sevens team and their "A" team. In 2011, after a recommendation from London Wasps, Maidment moved to Moseley Rugby Football Club and made his debut for them in the RFU Championship against Esher RFC. In 2011, a day after his graduation from Cambridge, Maidment moved to Cornish Pirates.

In 2013, Maidment moved to Jersey along with fellow Cornish Pirates players Aaron Penberthy and Grant Pointer. During pre-season, he was sent off against Coventry R.F.C. and was banned by the Rugby Football Union for a week. The ban was initially meant to be served during a friendly against French club, Le Rheu; however, this match did not go ahead. Jersey failed to inform the RFU and its officials that the ban was not served, and then fielded Maidment in their next match, against Plymouth Albion in the RFU Championship. As a result, Maidment and Jersey were charged by the RFU for "failure to act towards the RFU with utmost good faith and/or conduct prejudicial to the interests of the Union and/or the Game". The charge against Maidment was later dropped, but Jersey were fined £5,000 and deducted two RFU Championship points.

=== Representative career ===
While at university, Maidment represented Cambridge in The Varsity Match at Twickenham Stadium against Oxford University. Maidment was also selected to play for England Students. In 2011, Maidment was invited to play for the Barbarians against Bedford Blues, a match which the Barbarians won.
