= Alex Westlund =

American ice hockey player and coach

- Born: December 28, 1975 (age 50) Flemington, New Jersey, United States
- Height: 5 ft 9 in (175 cm)
- Weight: 181 lb (82 kg; 12 st 13 lb)
- Position: Goaltender
- Caught: Right
- Played for: KHL Medveščak
- National team: United States
- NHL draft: Undrafted
- Playing career: 1999–2014 Coaching career

Current position
- Title: Assistant coach
- Team: Connecticut
- Conference: Hockey East

Biographical details
- Education: Yale University

Coaching career (HC unless noted)
- 2025–Present: Connecticut (assistant)

Medal record

Representing United States

World Championships
Bronze medal – third place	2004 Czech Republic	

Alex Westlund (born December 28, 1975) is a retired American professional ice hockey goaltender who is now working as a coach. He is the former goalie Coach for the Detroit Red Wings of the NHL.

== Playing career ==
Raised in Chatham, New Jersey, Westlund played prep hockey at Chatham High School, starting in goal as a freshman, and at the Lawrenceville School, earning him a spot in 2010 in the New Jersey High School Ice Hockey Hall of Fame.

He attended Yale University from 1995 to 1999, earning All-America Second Team honors. In his final year at Yale, Westlund won the William Neely Mallory Award, "given to the senior man who on the field of play and in life at Yale best represents the highest ideals of American sportsmanship and Yale tradition", according to the Yale website. He left Yale holding several all-time school records, including wins, saves, and games played. He was also presented with the Ken Dryden Award for the ECAC’s best goalie of the year.

Westlund began his professional career with the Dayton Bombers of the East Coast Hockey League during the 1999–2000 season. His career includes stints in the IHL, ECHL, AHL, in Russia, Slovenia, Austria, Slovakia, Germany, Croatia, and China.

Westlund would also play for Team USA at the 2004 IIHF World Championship as the third goaltender, although he didn't have any ice time, his team would win bronze.

== Coaching career ==
He has been working for Pro Crease Goaltending since January 2013. In July 2015, Westlund was named goalie coach of German side Augsburger Panther. Prior to the 2016–17 season, he joined the staff of Medvescak Zagreb of the KHL as goalie coach. On July 8, 2022 he was hired to be the goaltending coach for the Detroit Red Wings under new head coach Derek Lalonde. At the conclusion of the 2024-25 NHL season, the Red Wings announced they were parting ways with Westlund.

== Awards and honours ==
Award	Year
All-ECAC First Team	1997–98
AHCA East Second-Team All-American	1997–98
Ice Hockey World Championships Bronze Medal (USA)	2004
Austrian League Most Valuable Player	2009–10

Awards
Preceded by Trevor Koenig	Ken Dryden Award; 1997–98	Succeeded by Eric Heffler
