= Joel Laing =

Canadian ice hockey player

- Born: November 3, 1975 (age 50) Maryfield, Saskatchewan, Canada
- Height: 5 ft 10 in (178 cm)
- Weight: 183 lb (83 kg; 13 st 1 lb)
- Position: Goaltender
- Caught: Left
- Played for: Wilkes-Barre/Scranton Penguins; Wheeling Nailers; Sheffield Steelers
- Playing career: 1996–2003

Joel J. Laing is a Canadian ice hockey coach and former goaltender who was an All-American for Rensselaer.

== Career ==
After finishing up his junior career, Laing travelled to New York and began attending Rensselaer Polytechnic Institute in the fall of 1996. He debuted for the ice hockey team as a freshman and shared the starting job with fellow freshman Scott Prekaski. The Engineers finished with a winning record, but neither of their two netminders distinguished themselves as the go-to goalie. It was much the same in Laing's second season, with the sophomore spearing to be heading for a good, but not great, college career. Things began to change in his junior year, however, and Laing began to demonstrate an improvement in net. He started 26 of the team's 37 games and finished the year with 5 shutouts, a new program record. Laing's senior season was his crowning achievement as he cut nearly a full point off of his goals against average and posted career highs in most categories. His .947 save percentage was one of the highest single-season totals for qualifying goalies in history and he bested his shutout record by blacking the opposition six times in 27 games. Laing was named as an All-American and was a finalist for the Hobey Baker Award. His performance got the team all the way to the ECAC Championship game and a #13 finish in the national ranking. Unfortunately, they were left out of the 12-team NCAA Tournament.

After graduating, Laing attended the Wilkes-Barre/Scranton Penguins training camp and was signed to a minor league contract. He was assigned the Wheeling Nailers and established himself as the team's top goaltender over the course of the season. He was called up to the AHL for 16 games and put up decent but unspectacular numbers. His second season appeared to be going even better, as his performance in the ECHL was improving, but he wasn't retained by the organization. Laing continued his playing career in England, suiting up for the Sheffield Steelers and compiling an outstanding season. He helped the team win the regular season championship, as well as the Challenge Cup, being named as not only the league's top goaltender, but the 2003 BISL Player of the Year.

Laing retired from professional hockey in 2003 and began working as a senior assurance manager for Ernst & Young. At the same time, he also enrolled at the University of Notre Dame and earned a master's in accounting in 2004. Laing remained with the company until 2012 when he joined the Sleep Number corporation, settling in the Minneapolis area. He worked his way up to Senior Director of Finance (as of 2021).

Laing couldn't stay away from hockey, however, and started coaching youth hockey in 2018. He's worked with several teams since, stick mostly with Squirt (10 and under) and Mite (8 and under) groups.

Laing was inducted into the RPI Athletic Hall of Fame in 2006.

== Statistics ==
=== Regular season and playoffs ===
| | | | Regular season | | | | | | | | | Playoffs |
| Season | Team | League | GP | W | L | T | MIN | GA | SO | GAA | SV% | GP | W | L | MIN | GA | SO | GAA | SV% |
|---|---|---|---|---|---|---|---|---|---|---|---|---|---|---|---|---|---|---|---|
| 1993–94 | Minot Americans | SJHL | 38 | — | — | — | — | 138 | 0 | 4.39 | .897 | — | — | — | — | — | — | — | — |
| 1994–95 | Minot Top Guns | SJHL | 36 | — | — | — | — | — | — | 3.79 | .890 | — | — | — | — | — | — | — | — |
| 1995–96 | Minot Top Guns | SJHL | 14 | — | — | — | — | — | — | 5.01 | — | — | — | — | — | — | — | — | — |
| 1995–96 | Melfort Mustangs | SJHL | 31 | 16 | 8 | 2 | 1600 | 91 | 0 | 3.41 | .899 | 2 | — | — | — | — | — | 3.00 | .910 |
| 1996–97 | Rensselaer | ECAC Hockey | 20 | 10 | 7 | 2 | 1096 | 56 | 0 | 3.07 | .918 | — | — | — | — | — | — | — | — |
| 1997–98 | Rensselaer | ECAC Hockey | 19 | 9 | 8 | 2 | 1076 | 53 | 2 | 2.95 | .909 | — | — | — | — | — | — | — | — |
| 1998–99 | Rensselaer | ECAC Hockey | 27 | 16 | 9 | 0 | 1559 | 73 | 5 | 2.81 | .921 | — | — | — | — | — | — | — | — |
| 1999–00 | Rensselaer | ECAC Hockey | 27 | 17 | 7 | 2 | 1613 | 49 | 6 | 1.82 | .947 | — | — | — | — | — | — | — | — |
| 2000–01 | Wheeling Nailers | ECHL | 47 | 17 | 18 | 7 | 2615 | 125 | 1 | 2.87 | .911 | — | — | — | — | — | — | — | — |
| 2000–01 | Wilkes-Barre/Scranton Penguins | AHL | 16 | 5 | 8 | 1 | 864 | 47 | 0 | 3.26 | .902 | — | — | — | — | — | — | — | — |
| 2001–02 | Wheeling Nailers | ECHL | 43 | 20 | 20 | 3 | 2382 | 110 | 2 | 2.77 | .925 | — | — | — | — | — | — | — | — |
| 2002–03 | Sheffield Steelers | BISL | 28 | — | — | — | 1710 | 44 | — | 1.54 | .941 | 17 | — | — | — | — | — | 2.74 | .910 |
| 2003–04 | Milestone Flyers | QVHL | 9 | — | — | — | — | — | — | 3.11 | — | — | — | — | — | — | — | — | — |
| NCAA totals | | | 93 | 52 | 31 | 6 | 5,345 | 231 | 13 | 2.59 | .926 | — | — | — | — | — | — | — | — |
| ECHL totals | | | 90 | 37 | 38 | 10 | 4,997 | 235 | 3 | 2.82 | .918 | — | — | — | — | — | — | — | — |

== Awards and honors ==
| Award | Year |
|---|---|
| All-ECAC Hockey First Team | 1999–00 |
| AHCA East First-Team All-American | 1999–00 |
| BISL First Team All-Star | 2002–03 |

Awards and achievements
| Preceded by Eric Heffler | Ken Dryden Award; 1999–00 | Succeeded by Oliver Jonas |
| Preceded by Kevin Riehl | BISL Player of the Year; 2002–03 | Succeeded by Jason Ruff |
