= Mark Murphy (ice hockey) =

American ice hockey player

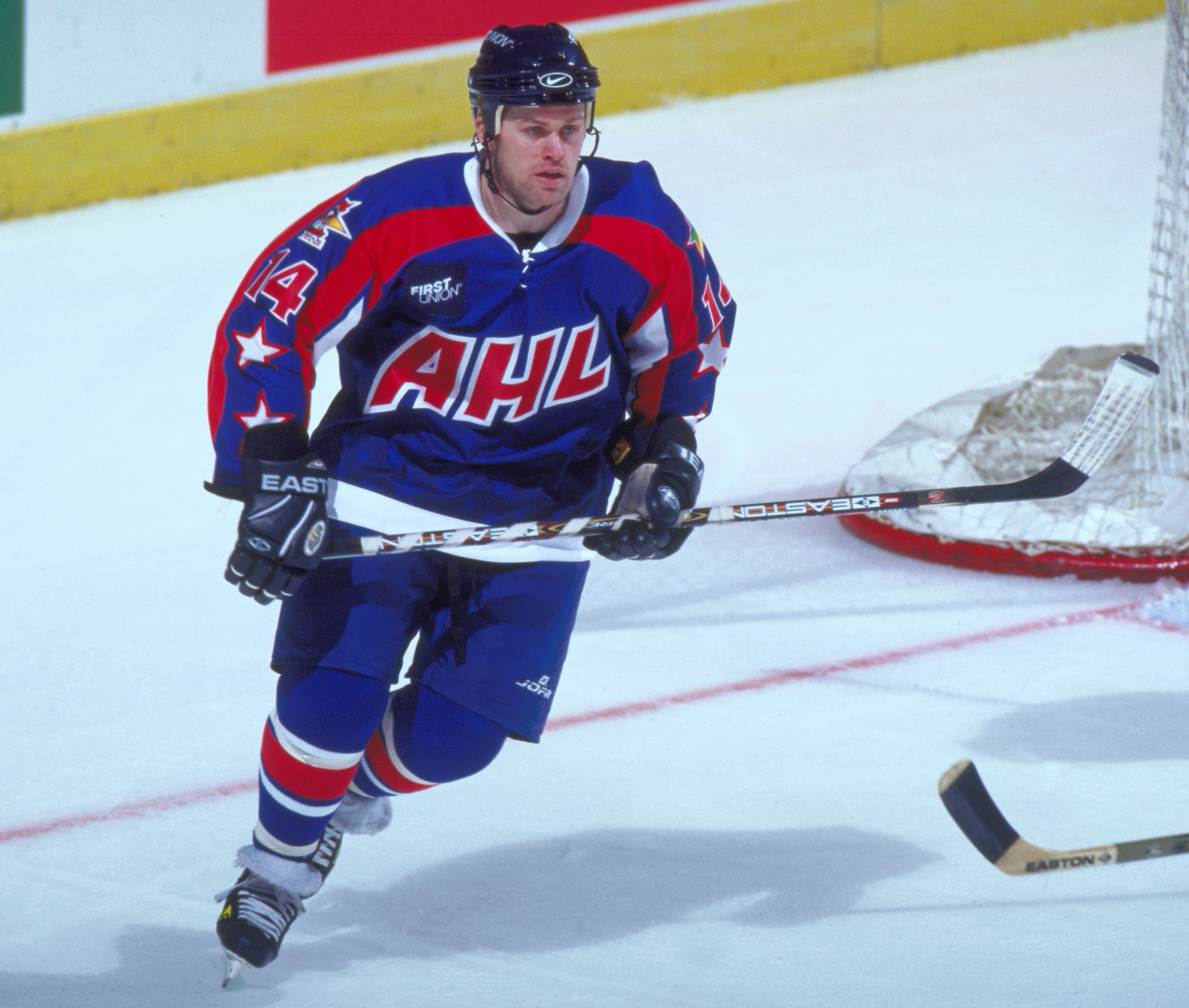
- Born: August 6, 1976 (age 49) Duxbury, Massachusetts, U.S.
- Height: 5 ft 11 in (180 cm)
- Weight: 198 lb (90 kg; 14 st 2 lb)
- Position: Left wing
- Shot: Left
- Played for: Wilkes-Barre/Scranton Penguins; Philadelphia Phantoms; Portland Pirates; HIFK; HC Fribourg-Gottéron; Augsburger Panther; DEG Metro Stars
- National team: United States
- NHL draft: 197th overall, 1995; Toronto Maple Leafs
- Playing career: 1999–2011

Mark Murphy (born August 6, 1976) is an American former professional ice hockey forward who played over 400 games in the American Hockey League before spending the final six years of his career in Europe. He last played for German club, the DEG Metro Stars of the Deutsche Eishockey Liga (DEL), in the 2010–11 season. He was selected by the Toronto Maple Leafs in the 8th round (197th overall) of the 1995 NHL entry draft.

== Career statistics ==
=== Regular season and playoffs ===
			Regular season					Playoffs
Season	Team	League	GP	G	A	Pts	PIM	GP	G	A	Pts	PIM
1994–95	Stratford Cullitons	MWJHL	47	52	56	108	64	—	—	—	—	—
1995–96	Stratford Cullitons	MWJHL	1	0	0	0	0	—	—	—	—	—
1995–96	RPI Engineers	ECAC	32	1	1	2	90	—	—	—	—	—
1996–97	RPI Engineers	ECAC	34	9	18	27	56	—	—	—	—	—
1997–98	RPI Engineers	ECAC	35	8	27	35	63	—	—	—	—	—
1998–99	RPI Engineers	ECAC	37	11	30	41	76	—	—	—	—	—
1999–2000	Wilkes–Barre/Scranton Penguins	AHL	38	11	22	33	35	—	—	—	—	—
1999–2000	Trenton Titans	ECHL	37	21	18	39	60	12	2	8	10	17
1999–2000	Philadelphia Phantoms	AHL	—	—	—	—	—	2	0	0	0	0
2000–01	Portland Pirates	AHL	76	29	41	70	92	3	2	0	2	2
2001–02	Portland Pirates	AHL	77	20	37	57	56	—	—	—	—	—
2002–03	Portland Pirates	AHL	55	18	24	42	84	3	0	1	1	2
2003–04	Philadelphia Phantoms	AHL	80	16	22	38	104	12	5	4	9	0
2004–05	Philadelphia Phantoms	AHL	65	13	30	43	75	6	1	1	2	6
2005–06	Philadelphia Phantoms	AHL	2	2	0	2	2	—	—	—	—	—
2005–06	HIFK	SM-l	21	4	3	7	32	—	—	—	—	—
2005–06	HC Fribourg–Gottéron	NLA	8	1	3	4	6	—	—	—	—	—
2006–07	Augsburger Panther	DEL	28	8	16	24	56	—	—	—	—	—
2007–08	Augsburger Panther	DEL	55	22	12	34	68	—	—	—	—	—
2008–09	Augsburger Panther	DEL	50	19	32	51	115	4	0	3	3	14
2009–10	DEG Metro Stars	DEL	54	10	19	29	110	3	0	1	1	2
2010–11	DEG Metro Stars	DEL	44	3	9	12	91	9	1	2	3	8
AHL totals			393	109	176	285	448	26	8	6	14	10
DEL totals			231	62	88	150	440	16	1	6	7	24

=== International ===
Year	Team	Event	Result	GP	G	A	Pts	PIM
2001	United States	WC	4th	7	2	0	2	6
Senior totals				7	2	0	2	6

== Awards and honours ==
Award	Year
AHL
All-Star Game	2001
Calder Cup (Philadelphia Phantoms)	2005
DEL
All-Star Game	2009
