= Dennis Packard =

American ice hockey player

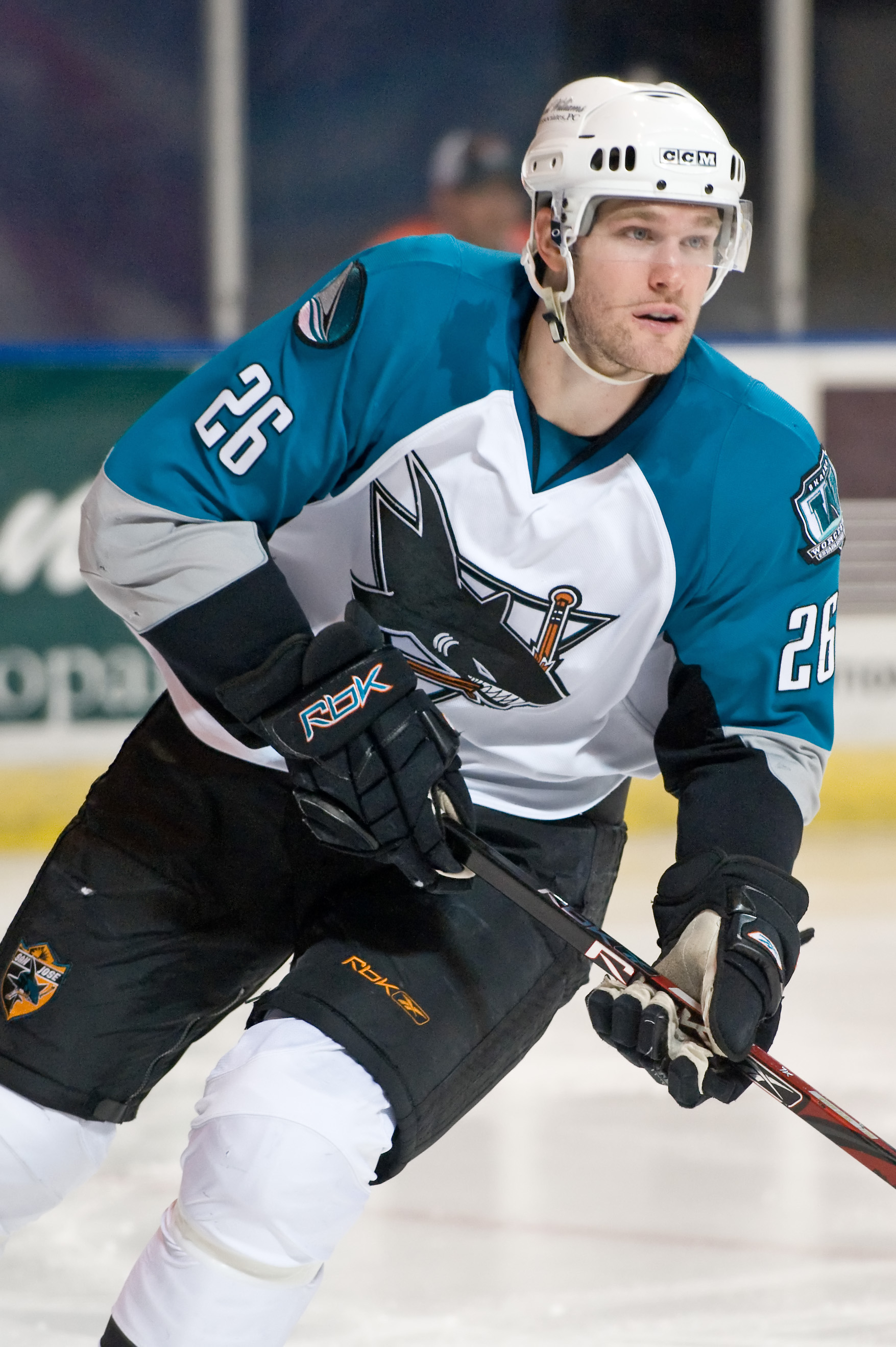
- Packard with the Worcester Sharks in 2008
- Born: February 9, 1982 (age 43); St. Catharines, Ontario, Canada
- Height: 6 ft 5 in (196 cm)
- Weight: 233 lb (106 kg; 16 st 9 lb)
- Position: Left wing
- Shot: Left
- Played for: Springfield Falcons; Providence Bruins; Worcester Sharks; Utah Grizzlies; HC Liberec
- NHL draft: 219th overall, 2001; Tampa Bay Lightning
- Playing career: 2004–2010

Dennis Packard (born February 9, 1982) is a Canadian-American former professional ice hockey player, who last played for the HC Bílí Tygři Liberec of the Czech Extraliga.

== Early life ==
Although born in Canada, he grew up in Kingston, Pennsylvania, where he attended high school and began his ice hockey career at Wyoming Seminary, and has dual-citizenship. Packard is the son of Dr. H. Jeremy Packard, who served as President of Wyoming Seminary from 1990–2007, and Ingrid Cronin.

== Playing career ==
During his high-school years Packard played for the Wyoming Seminary Blue Knights, a national prep school program. In his senior year, he was selected to the US Junior National Team in 1999-2000, and spent the fall and winter with the National Team Development program in Michigan. When playing for the Harvard University hockey team and pursuing an undergraduate degree, Packard was drafted by Tampa Bay Lightning in round 7 of the 2001 NHL Entry Draft. Between 2004 and 2006 he played for the Springfield Falcons in the AHL as well as for the Johnstown Chiefs in the ECHL. In 2006, he signed as an unrestricted free agent with the Boston Bruins. He played a season with the Providence Bruins, then moved to the San Jose Sharks organization, playing with their AHL affiliate in Worcester. Most recently, Packard joined the Bridgeport Sound Tigers, the AHL affiliate of the New York Islanders.

== Post-playing career ==
Dennis is currently attending Columbia Business School.

== Career statistics ==
=== Regular season and playoffs ===
			Regular season					Playoffs
Season	Team	League	GP	G	A	Pts	PIM	GP	G	A	Pts	PIM
1998–99	Wyoming Seminary	HS Prep
1999–2000	US NTDP Juniors	USHL	55	11	14	25	85	—	—	—	—	—
2000–01	Harvard University	HE	33	4	4	8	28	—	—	—	—	—
2001–02	Harvard University	HE	32	9	10	19	34	—	—	—	—	—
2002–03	Harvard University	HE	30	8	8	16	32	—	—	—	—	—
2003–04	Harvard University	HE	36	11	11	22	16	—	—	—	—	—
2004–05	Springfield Falcons	AHL	47	2	8	10	25	—	—	—	—	—
2004–05	Johnstown Chiefs	ECHL	15	3	4	7	6	—	—	—	—	—
2005–06	Springfield Falcons	AHL	46	3	6	9	34	—	—	—	—	—
2005–06	Johnstown Chiefs	ECHL	16	2	9	11	12	5	0	1	1	4
2006–07	Providence Bruins	AHL	68	6	12	18	55	13	1	1	2	2
2007–08	Worcester Sharks	AHL	76	11	19	30	31	—	—	—	—	—
2008–09	Utah Grizzlies	ECHL	11	5	6	11	8	—	—	—	—	—
2008–09	Bridgeport Sound Tigers	AHL	36	0	3	3	21	2	0	0	0	4
2009–10	Bílí Tygři Liberec	ELH	10	0	2	2	4	—	—	—	—	—
AHL totals			273	22	48	70	166	15	1	1	2	6

=== International ===
Year	Team	Event	GP	G	A	Pts	PIM
2000	United States	WJC18	6	0	1	1	2
Junior totals			6	0	1	1	2
