= Jack Semler =

American ice hockey coach and player

Biographical details
- Born: Salisbury, Connecticut, U.S.
- Education: Vermont

Playing career
- 1964–1968: Vermont
- Position: Wing

Coaching career (HC unless noted)
- 1973–1977: Princeton
- 1977–1984: Maine
- 2006–2008: Skidmore (assistant)
- 2008–2011: Assumption (assistant)
- 2012–2013: Nichols (assistant)

Head coaching record
- Overall: 130–178–7

John D. Semler is an American ice hockey coach and former player who was the first head coach for Maine.

== Career ==
Jack Semler played at Vermont for four seasons during the short period when it was a Division II program. After graduating he eventually rose to become the head coach at Princeton. After four unproductive seasons with the Tigers he accepted the post to be the first head coach for Maine's ice hockey program. Semler posted winning records in both seasons that Maine played in Division II and helped the Black Bears to a good showing in their first year at the Division I level. The program slumped a bit beginning in 1981–82, and though improvement was shown in his final season, Semler left the college ranks in 1984.

Semler would continue coaching but wouldn't return to the NCAA until 2006 when he became an assistant for Skidmore College. After stops at both Assumption College and Nichols College Semler ended up at Rice Memorial High School.

== Head coaching record ==
Record table
Season	Team	Overall	Conference	Standing	Postseason
Princeton Tigers (ECAC Hockey) (1973–1977)
1973–74	Princeton	9-14-1	7-12-1	14th	
1974–75	Princeton	6-15-2	5-13-2	14th	
1975–76	Princeton	7-16-1	6-16-1	t-14th	
1976–77	Princeton	3-21-1	3-20-1	17th	
Princeton:		25-66-5	21-61-5		
Maine Black Bears (ECAC 2) (1977–1979)
1977–78	Maine	13-12-0	10-9-0	15th	
1978–79	Maine	22-8-0	16-4-0	T–4th	ECAC 2 East Semifinals
Maine:		35-20-0			
Maine Black Bears (ECAC Hockey) (1979–1984)
1979–80	Maine	15-16-1	10-11-1	9th	
1980–81	Maine	23-11-0	12-9-0	t-4th	ECAC Quarterfinals
1981–82	Maine	8-21-0	3-18-0	17th	
1982–83	Maine	5-24-0	1-20-0	17th	
1983–84	Maine	14-20-0	7-14-0	13th	
Maine:		65-92-1	33-72-1		
Total:		125-178-6			
National champion Postseason invitational champion Conference regular season champion Conference regular season and conference tournament champion Division regular season champion Division regular season and conference tournament champion Conference tournament champion
