= Bob Prier =

Canadian ice hockey player and coach

Biographical details
- Born: August 15, 1976 (age 50); Nepean, Ontario, Canada
- Education: St. Lawrence University

Playing career
- 1992–1995: Nepean Raiders
- 1995–1999: St. Lawrence
- 1999–2000: Pee Dee Pride
- Position: Forward

Coaching career (HC unless noted)
- 1999–2000: Nepean Raiders (Assistant)
- 2000–2001: Denver (Assistant)
- 2001–2002: Princeton (Assistant)
- 2002–2011: St. Lawrence (Assistant)
- 2011–2014: Princeton

Head coaching record
- Overall: 29–84–11 (.278)

Robert Prier is a Canadian ice hockey former player and head coach who is noted for his brief tenure with the men's program at Princeton.

== Career ==
Prier began his college career in 1995 after finishing second in the CJHL in scoring the year before. Prier continued his scoring at the college level, leading St. Lawrence in goals his junior season. In his senior season he led the team in goals and points while the Saints made their first NCAA appearance in seven years. After graduating with a degree in economics Prier signed a multi-year contract with the Ottawa Senators. He suffered a career-ending injury after playing only three games as a professional with the Pee Dee Pride.

The same year Prier was hired by his former junior team as an assistant coach but quickly jumped back to the college ranks the following year. He spent one year at both Denver and Princeton before signing on with his alma mater in 2002. Prier spent two years as an assistant and another seven as associate head coach before he was offered the top position with Princeton in 2011. Prier's first two seasons with the Tigers ended with poor but respectable records but his third saw the tigers finish last in the ECAC. Prier resigned after the season and it was reported that he had done so under pressure from outgoing athletic director Gary Walters.

== College Head Coaching record ==
Record table
Season	Team	Overall	Conference	Standing	Postseason
Princeton Tigers (ECAC Hockey) (2011–2014)
2011–12	Princeton	9–16–7	6–12–4	11th	ECAC Hockey First Round
2012–13	Princeton	10–16–5	8–12–4	t-7th	ECAC Hockey First Round
2013–14	Princeton	6–26–0	4–18–0	12th	ECAC Hockey First Round
Princeton:		25–58–12	18–42–8		
Total:		25–58–12			
National champion Postseason invitational champion Conference regular season champion Conference regular season and conference tournament champion Division regular season champion Division regular season and conference tournament champion Conference tournament champion
