= Kent Huskins =

Canadian ice hockey player (born 1979)

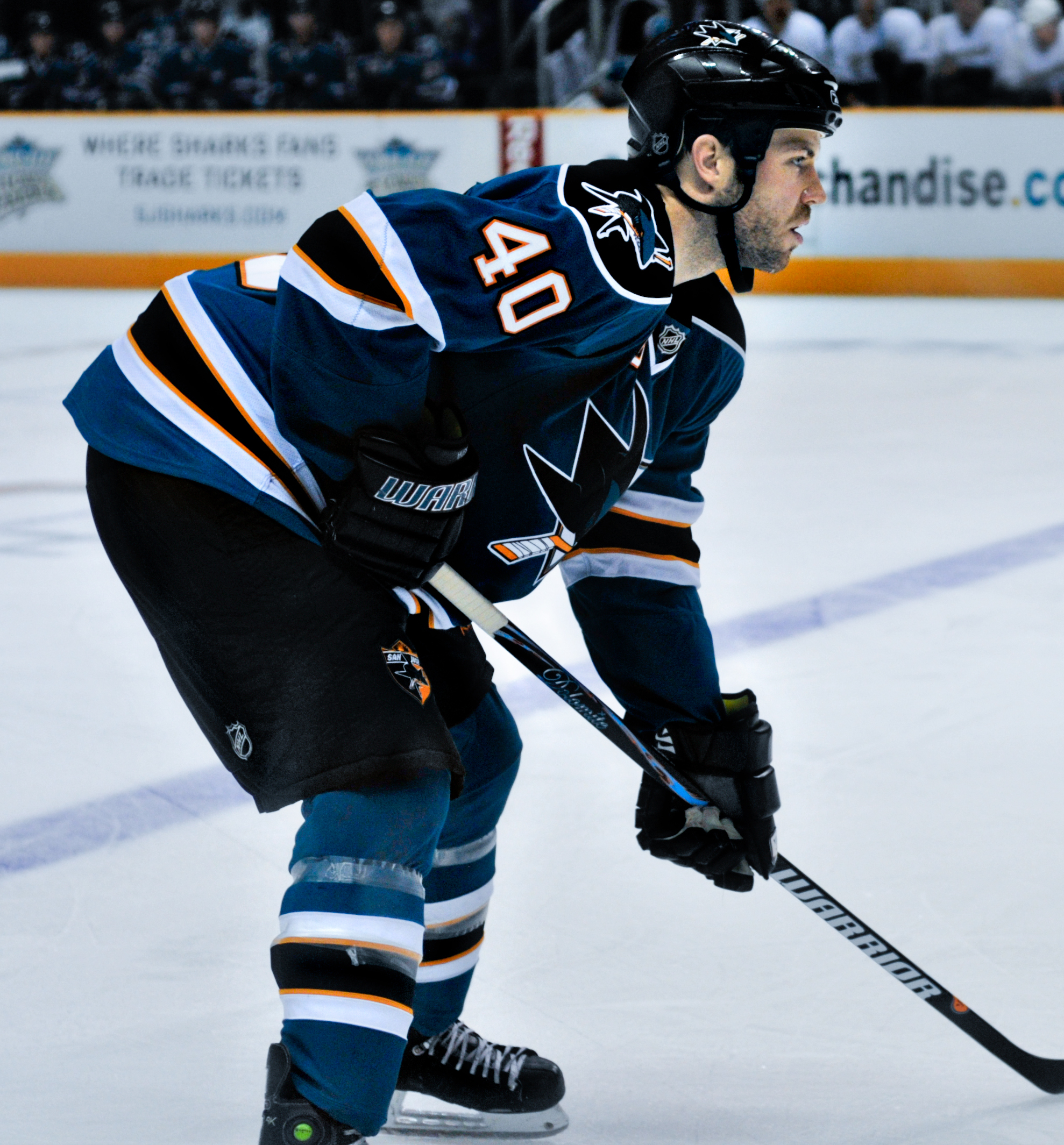
- Huskins with the San Jose Sharks in 2009
- Born: May 4, 1979 (age 47) Almonte, Ontario, Canada
- Height: 6 ft 3 in (191 cm)
- Weight: 217 lb (98 kg; 15 st 7 lb)
- Position: Defence
- Shot: Left
- Played for: Anaheim Ducks; San Jose Sharks; St. Louis Blues; Detroit Red Wings; Philadelphia Flyers
- NHL draft: 156th overall, 1998; Chicago Blackhawks
- Playing career: 2001–2015

Kent Huskins (born May 4, 1979) is a Canadian former professional ice hockey defenceman who played seven seasons in the National Hockey League (NHL) for the Anaheim Ducks, San Jose Sharks, St. Louis Blues, Detroit Red Wings, and Philadelphia Flyers.

== Playing career ==
Before making his NHL debut with the Ducks in 2006, Huskins played five seasons in the American Hockey League (AHL). He was drafted 156th overall in the 1998 NHL entry draft by the Chicago Blackhawks, and played for the Norfolk Admirals, the San Antonio Rampage, and the Manitoba Moose of the AHL before joining the Ducks' AHL affiliate, the Portland Pirates, in 2005. He had played four seasons at Clarkson University, and in his senior year, was an NCAA East First Team All-American and a finalist for the Hobey Baker Award.

Huskins made his NHL debut on December 23, 2006 when the Ducks played the Phoenix Coyotes. Kent was recalled from Portland to fill a gap in the Anaheim defensive corps caused by an injury to Sean O'Donnell, and then later to Chris Pronger. He was sent back down a month later, but called up for good when the Ducks dealt Shane O'Brien at the trade deadline. He won the Stanley Cup with the Ducks in 2007.

On October 15, 2007, Huskins scored his first career goal in a game versus the Detroit Red Wings.

Huskins was traded to the San Jose Sharks on March 4, 2009 along with Travis Moen for Nick Bonino, Timo Pielmeier and a fourth round draft pick in 2011.

In the offseason, Huskins was signed to the most lucrative contract he had ever had, signing a two-year deal that would pay him US$1.5 million the first year and US$1.9 million the second year.

On July 2, 2011 he was signed as a free agent to a one-year deal with the St. Louis Blues for $1 million. In a largely ineffective 2011–12 season with the Blues hampered by injury, Huskins appeared in only 25 games, scoring 7 points.

After a resolution to the 2012–13 NHL lockout was reached, Huskins signed as a free agent to a try-out contract with his first professional team the Norfolk Admirals on January 17, 2013. Less than a week later, he was signed as a free agent to a one-year deal by the Detroit Red Wings. Used sparingly by the Red Wings as a reserve defenseman, Huskins went scoreless with 4 penalty minutes in 11 games. With the signing of defenseman Danny DeKeyser the Red Wings were over the league roster limit at the trade deadline and were obligated to reduce the roster. Huskins was traded to the Philadelphia Flyers for a conditional 7th-round pick in the 2014 NHL Entry Draft on March 30, 2013. In eight games with the Flyers, he recorded one assist before suffering a season-ending concussion.

== Career statistics ==
| | | | Regular season | | | | | Playoffs |
| Season | Team | League | GP | G | A | Pts | PIM | GP | G | A | Pts | PIM |
|---|---|---|---|---|---|---|---|---|---|---|---|---|
| 1995–96 | Kanata Valley Lasers | CJAHL | 49 | 6 | 21 | 27 | 18 | — | — | — | — | — |
| 1996–97 | Kanata Valley Lasers | CJAHL | 53 | 11 | 36 | 47 | 89 | — | — | — | — | — |
| 1997–98 | Clarkson University | ECAC | 35 | 2 | 8 | 10 | 46 | — | — | — | — | — |
| 1998–99 | Clarkson University | ECAC | 37 | 5 | 11 | 16 | 28 | — | — | — | — | — |
| 1999–00 | Clarkson University | ECAC | 28 | 2 | 16 | 18 | 30 | — | — | — | — | — |
| 2000–01 | Clarkson University | ECAC | 35 | 6 | 28 | 34 | 22 | — | — | — | — | — |
| 2001–02 | Norfolk Admirals | AHL | 65 | 4 | 11 | 15 | 44 | 4 | 0 | 1 | 1 | 0 |
| 2002–03 | Norfolk Admirals | AHL | 80 | 5 | 22 | 27 | 48 | 9 | 2 | 2 | 4 | 4 |
| 2003–04 | San Antonio Rampage | AHL | 79 | 5 | 14 | 19 | 42 | — | — | — | — | — |
| 2004–05 | Manitoba Moose | AHL | 65 | 5 | 11 | 16 | 41 | 14 | 0 | 2 | 2 | 12 |
| 2005–06 | Portland Pirates | AHL | 80 | 8 | 23 | 31 | 64 | 18 | 3 | 6 | 8 | 14 |
| 2006–07 | Portland Pirates | AHL | 39 | 3 | 12 | 15 | 23 | — | — | — | — | — |
| 2006–07 | Anaheim Ducks | NHL | 33 | 0 | 3 | 3 | 14 | 21 | 0 | 1 | 1 | 11 |
| 2007–08 | Anaheim Ducks | NHL | 76 | 4 | 15 | 19 | 59 | 6 | 0 | 1 | 1 | 2 |
| 2008–09 | Anaheim Ducks | NHL | 33 | 2 | 4 | 6 | 27 | — | — | — | — | — |
| 2009–10 | San Jose Sharks | NHL | 82 | 3 | 19 | 22 | 47 | 15 | 0 | 0 | 0 | 6 |
| 2010–11 | San Jose Sharks | NHL | 50 | 2 | 8 | 10 | 12 | 5 | 0 | 1 | 1 | 2 |
| 2011–12 | St. Louis Blues | NHL | 25 | 2 | 5 | 7 | 10 | 1 | 0 | 0 | 0 | 2 |
| 2012–13 | Norfolk Admirals | AHL | 2 | 0 | 1 | 1 | 2 | — | — | — | — | — |
| 2012–13 | Detroit Red Wings | NHL | 11 | 0 | 0 | 0 | 4 | — | — | — | — | — |
| 2012–13 | Philadelphia Flyers | NHL | 8 | 0 | 1 | 1 | 0 | — | — | — | — | — |
| 2013–14 | Utica Comets | AHL | 65 | 3 | 7 | 10 | 31 | — | — | — | — | — |
| 2014–15 | Utica Comets | AHL | 50 | 1 | 5 | 6 | 8 | 20 | 1 | 2 | 3 | 6 |
| NHL totals | | | 318 | 13 | 55 | 68 | 173 | 48 | 0 | 3 | 3 | 23 |

== Awards and honors ==
| Award | Year |
|---|---|
| All-ECAC Hockey First Team | 1999–00 |
| All-ECAC Hockey First Team | 2000–01 |
| AHCA East First-Team All-American | 2000–01 |
| Stanley Cup champion (Anaheim) | 2007 |

== Transactions ==
- June 27, 1998: Drafted by the Chicago Blackhawks in the sixth round (156th overall).
- August 13, 2003: Signed as an unrestricted free agent by the Florida Panthers.
- September 16, 2004: Signed as a free agent by the Vancouver Canucks.
- August 30, 2005: Signed as a free agent by the Mighty Ducks of Anaheim.
- March 4, 2009: Traded to the San Jose Sharks along with Travis Moen for Nick Bonino, Timo Pielmeier, and a fourth round draft pick in 2011.
- July 2, 2011: Signed as a free agent by the St. Louis Blues.
- January 22, 2013: Signed as a free agent by the Detroit Red Wings.
- March 30, 2013: Traded to the Philadelphia Flyers for a conditional seventh round draft pick.

Awards and achievements
| Preceded by Justin Harney | ECAC Hockey Best Defensive Defenseman; 2000–01 | Succeeded by Brian McMeekin |
