= David Kozier =

Canadian ice hockey player

- Born: April 8, 1978 (age 46); Terrace, B.C., CAN
- Height: 5 ft 10 in (178 cm)
- Weight: 194 lb (88 kg; 13 st 12 lb)
- Position: Forward
- Shot: Left
- Played for: Manchester Phoenix
- Playing career: 1998–2004

David Kozier (born April 8, 1978 in Terrace, British Columbia) is a Canadian former professional ice hockey player. Kozier first played at junior level for the Prince George Spruce Kings in his native British Columbia. After scoring 89 points in 58 regular season games, Kozier moved on to play at university level.

Kozier attended university in the United States, playing at NCAA level for Cornell University. Kozier combined his studies in Applied Economics and Business Management along with playing for the famously named 'Big Red'. In four seasons playing for Cornell, Kozier totalled more than 50 points as well as clocking 80 penalty minutes. He was also a member of the Quill and Dagger society.

His form at NCAA level led him to sign for the Isle of Wight Raiders, now renamed the Wightlink Raiders. In just one season in 2002/03, Kozier would show an astounding production, scoring 134 points in just 37 EPL appearances. During the 2002/03 season, Kozier would make a guest appearance for the Basingstoke Bison, scoring a hat-trick against the Bracknell Bees. Kozier's form throughout the season, combined with his play against the Bees led to then head-coach of the Manchester Phoenix, Rick Brebant signing Kozier. Kozier would play for the Phoenix in their inaugural season in the newly formed EIHL. The Phoenix had been established after the collapse of the earlier Manchester franchise, the Manchester Storm.

Kozier was again productive for the Phoenix, and played regularly in the first team, helping the Phoenix into the post-season before the franchise was temporarily suspended due to off-ice financial problems. The Phoenix would not rise again until the 2006/07 season. When the season came to a close in 2004, Kozier retired from professional hockey aged just 26, choosing to pursue a career more aligned with the qualification he claimed whilst at Cornell.

== Career stats ==
| | | | Regular season | | | | | Playoffs | | | | |
| Season | Team | League | GP | G | A | Pts | PIM | GP | G | A | Pts | PIM |
|---|---|---|---|---|---|---|---|---|---|---|---|---|
| 1997-98 | Prince George Spruce Kings | BCHL | 58 | 43 | 46 | 89 | 71 | - | - | - | - | - |
| 1998–99 | Cornell University | NCAA | 30 | 11 | 13 | 24 | 32 | - | - | - | - | - |
| 1999–00 | Cornell University | NCAA | 13 | 1 | 2 | 3 | 6 | - | - | - | - | - |
| 2000–01 | Cornell University | NCAA | 33 | 7 | 5 | 12 | 22 | - | - | - | - | - |
| 2001–02 | Cornell University | NCAA | 32 | 5 | 7 | 12 | 20 | - | - | - | - | - |
| 2002-03 | Isle Of Wight Raiders | EPL | 37 | 70 | 64 | 134 | 44 | - | - | - | - | - |
| 2002-03 | Basingstoke Bison | BNL | 1 | 3 | 0 | 3 | 0 | - | - | - | - | - |
| 2003-04 | Manchester Phoenix | EIHL | 49 | 16 | 11 | 27 | 56 | 6 | 1 | 0 | 1 | 2 |
