= Matt Underhill =

Canadian ice hockey player

- Born: September 16, 1979 (age 45); Campbell River, British Columbia, Canada
- Height: 6 ft 2 in (188 cm)
- Weight: 220 lb (100 kg; 15 st 10 lb)
- Position: Goalie
- Caught: Left
- Played for: Alaska Aces
- NHL draft: 170th overall, 1999; Calgary Flames
- Playing career: 2002–2006

Matthew Joseph Underhill (born September 16, 1979) is a Canadian retired professional ice hockey goaltender who played in one National Hockey League game with the Chicago Blackhawks during the 2003–04 season. The rest of his career, which lasted from 2002 to 2006, was spent in the minor leagues. He was inaugurated into the Cornell Athletic Hall of Fame on November 3, 2012. He has three children, and coaches ice hockey at Kimball Union Academy in Meriden, New Hampshire, United States.

== Career statistics ==
=== Regular season and playoffs ===
			Regular season									Playoffs
Season	Team	League	GP	W	L	T	MIN	GA	SO	GAA	SV%	GP	W	L	MIN	GA	SO	GAA	SV%
1996–97	Notre Dame Hounds	SJHL	27	—	—	—	—	—	0	4.30	—	—	—	—	—	—	—	—	—
1997–98	Notre Dame Hounds	SJHL	43	18	22	3	2573	132	2	3.07	.911	—	—	—	—	—	—	—	—
1998–99	Cornell University	ECAC	25	7	10	4	1320	65	1	2.95	.902	—	—	—	—	—	—	—	—
1999–00	Cornell University	ECAC	18	8	7	1	912	44	1	2.89	.894	—	—	—	—	—	—	—	—
2000–01	Cornell University	ECAC	25	13	8	3	1504	47	1	1.88	.928	—	—	—	—	—	—	—	—
2001–02	Cornell University	ECAC	21	14	6	1	1334	40	3	1.80	.922	—	—	—	—	—	—	—	—
2002–03	Pee Dee Pride	ECHL	33	16	13	2	1878	88	0	2.81	.907	—	—	—	—	—	—	—	—
2002–03	Providence Bruins	AHL	7	3	3	1	429	22	0	3.08	.901	—	—	—	—	—	—	—	—
2003–04	Chicago Blackhawks	NHL	1	0	1	0	61	4	0	3.95	.879	—	—	—	—	—	—	—	—
2003–04	Manchester Monarchs	AHL	4	2	2	0	186	9	0	2.90	.903	—	—	—	—	—	—	—	—
2003–04	Norfolk Admirals	AHL	1	0	0	0	20	0	0	0.00	1.000	—	—	—	—	—	—	—	—
2003–04	Florence Pride	ECHL	29	10	14	4	1686	97	1	3.45	.897	—	—	—	—	—	—	—	—
2004–05	Mississippi Sea Wolves	ECHL	24	13	8	3	1450	64	3	2.65	.923	—	—	—	—	—	—	—	—
2004–05	St. John's Maple Leafs	AHL	1	0	0	1	39	0	0	0.00	1.000	—	—	—	—	—	—	—	—
2004–05	Providence Bruins	AHL	5	1	2	1	244	12	1	2.95	.885	—	—	—	—	—	—	—	—
2004–05	Alaska Aces	ECHL	3	3	0	0	180	6	0	2.00	.943	3	1	1	145	8	0	3.31	.893
2005–06	Alaska Aces	ECHL	50	36	10	3	2980	113	5	2.28	.917	10	8	2	599	28	0	2.80	.907
AHL totals			18	6	7	3	918	43	1	2.81	.901	—	—	—	—	—	—	—	—
ECHL totals			139	78	45	12	8174	368	9	2.70	.912	13	9	3	744	36	0	2.90	.904
NHL totals			1	0	1	0	61	4	0	3.95	.879	—	—	—	—	—	—	—	—

== Awards and honors ==
Award	Year
All-ECAC Hockey First Team	2001–02
AHCA East First-Team All-American	2001–02
ECAC Hockey All-Tournament Team	2002

== See also ==
- List of players who played only one game in the NHL

Awards and achievements
Preceded by Oliver Jonas	Ken Dryden Award; 2001–02	Succeeded by David LeNeveu
