= Jeff Halpern =

American ice hockey player (born 1976)

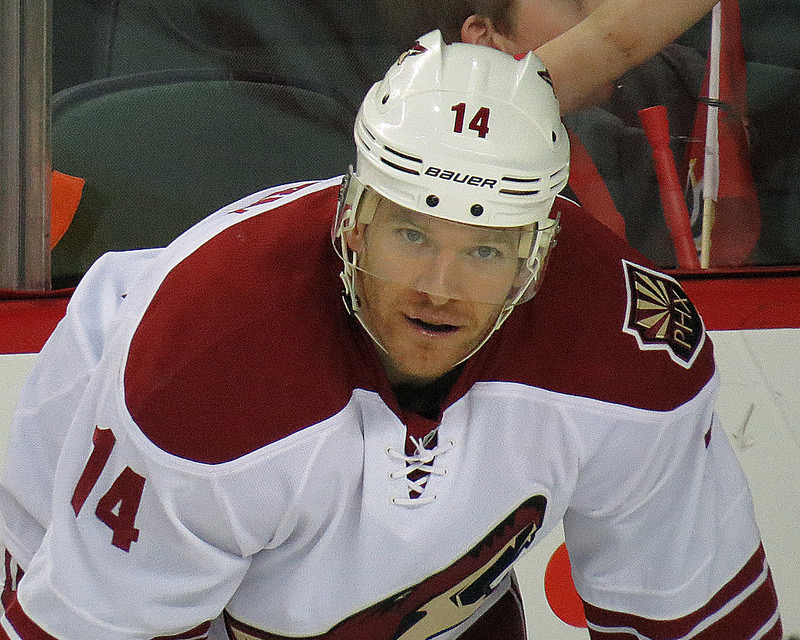
- Halpern with the Phoenix Coyotes in 2014
- Born: May 3, 1976 (age 50) Potomac, Maryland, U.S.
- Height: 6 ft 0 in (183 cm)
- Weight: 200 lb (91 kg; 14 st 4 lb)
- Position: Center
- Shot: Right
- Played for: Washington Capitals; Dallas Stars; Tampa Bay Lightning; Los Angeles Kings; Montreal Canadiens; New York Rangers; Phoenix Coyotes
- National team: United States
- NHL draft: Undrafted
- Playing career: 1999–2014
Medal record
Representing United States
Ice hockey
World Championships
Bronze medal – third place	2004 Prague

Jeffrey Craig Halpern (born May 3, 1976) is an American former professional ice hockey player. He played for the Washington Capitals twice, Dallas Stars, Tampa Bay Lightning, Los Angeles Kings, New York Rangers, Montreal Canadiens, and Phoenix Coyotes. In 14 National Hockey League (NHL) seasons, he had 152 goals and 221 assists (373 points) in 976 regular-season games. He also had seven goals and 14 points in 39 Stanley Cup playoff games. He was also captain of the United States national team for the 2008 World Championships.

He is currently an assistant coach for the Tampa Bay Lightning of the NHL.

== Early life ==
Halpern was born in Potomac, Maryland, to Gloria (née Klein) and Melvin Halpern. As a youth, he played in the 1989 and 1990 Quebec International Pee-Wee Hockey Tournaments with the Washington Capitals minor ice hockey team. Halpern attended Winston Churchill High School in Potomac, which at the time did not have a hockey team. In order to pursue his dreams as a hockey player, Halpern transferred to and later graduated from St. Paul's School in Concord, New Hampshire where he was roommates with future The Bachelorette winner Ian McKee. He then attended and graduated from Princeton University. There, he played four seasons of varsity hockey for the Princeton Tigers men's ice hockey team, was named an ECAC second team All-Star in 1998 and 1999, and in 1999 he scored 22 goals to tie for the most goals in the ECAC and was co-winner of Princeton's Roper Trophy for athletic and academic achievement.

== Playing career ==
Undrafted, Halpern began his NHL career in the 1999–2000 NHL season for the Washington Capitals. He played in 79 games, scoring 18 goals with 11 assists, and was +21. He was the first member of the Capitals to be born and raised in the Washington, D.C. area.

The 2003–04 NHL season was his highest-scoring season in the NHL, finishing with 46 points with 19 goals and 27 assists in 79 games.

During the 2004–05 NHL lockout, Halpern played for the Kloten Flyers and for HC Ajoie in Switzerland, and returned to the Capitals when the lockout ended. On September 23, 2005, the Washington Capitals named Halpern the twelfth team captain in franchise history. In the 2005–06 NHL season, he scored 11 goals, and added a career-high 33 assists.

On July 5, 2006, Halpern left the Capitals as a free agent and signed a four-year deal with the Dallas Stars.

On February 26, 2008, Halpern was dealt to the Tampa Bay Lightning along with Mike Smith, Jussi Jokinen, and a 2009 4th-round draft pick in exchange for Brad Richards and Johan Holmqvist. Halpern scored a goal in his Lightning debut, and added an assist. After being acquired by the Lightning, Halpern went on a huge hot streak, scoring 10 goals and 18 points in 19 games. He also led the league during the 2007–08 NHL season in games played as one of only two players to appear in 83 games, or one more than a team's full schedule, as a result of his trade to Tampa Bay. The other was Brian Campbell. Playing in 52 games during the 2008-09 NHL Season, Halpern scored seven goals to go with nine assists.

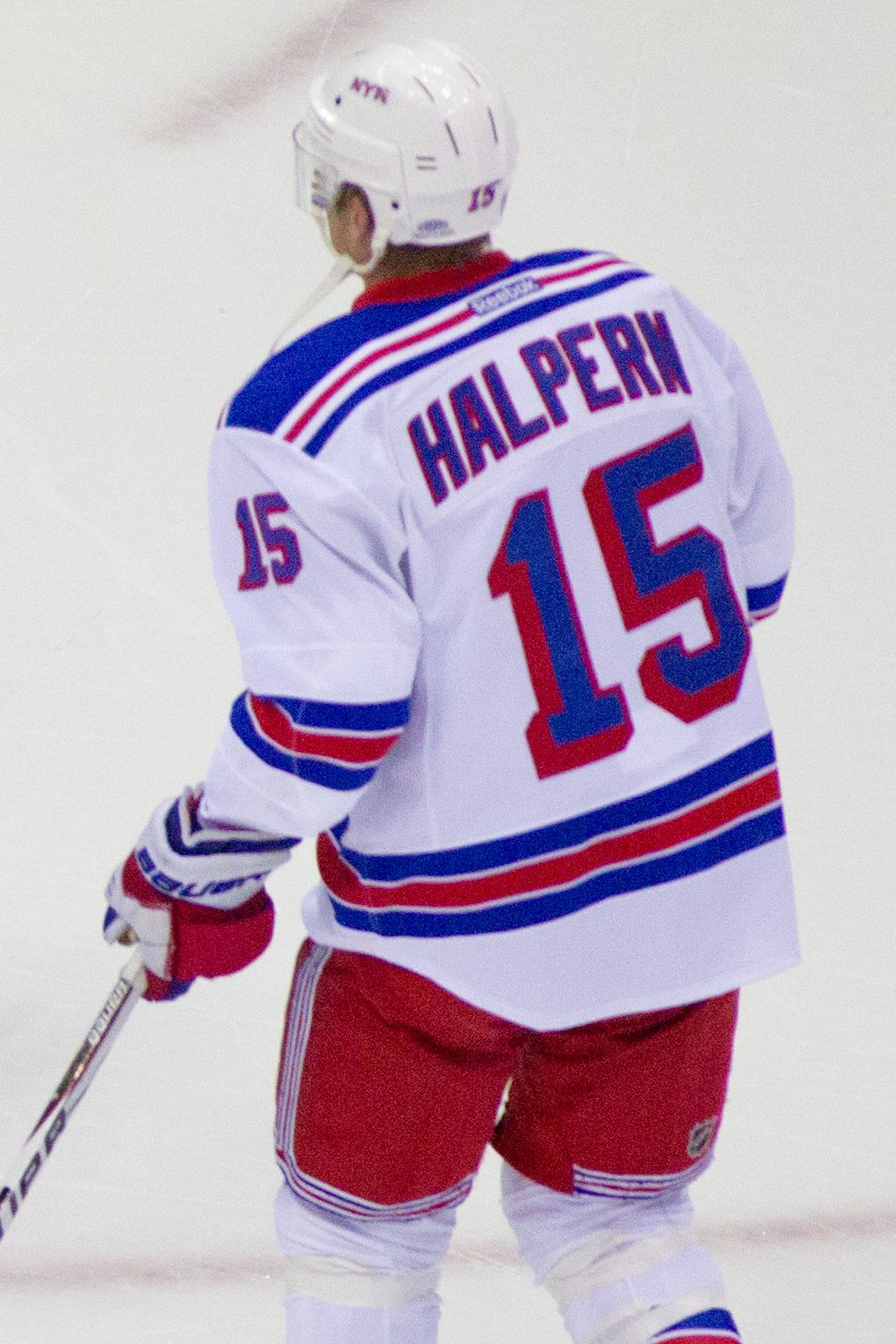
Halpern during his tenure with the Rangers.

Halpern was named the captain of the United States national team for the 2008 World Championships in Canada. Playing in a 5–4 loss in the opening round against the Canadian team on May 6, 2008, he suffered a ruptured anterior cruciate ligament and was expected to be out of action for 6–8 months. This occurred in the same game where USA goaltender Tim Thomas was injured and had to leave the team.

Halpern was traded from the Lightning to the Los Angeles Kings March 3, 2010, in exchange for Teddy Purcell and a 3rd round draft pick in 2010.

On September 7, 2010, Halpern signed a one-year contract with the Montreal Canadiens. He signed a one-year contract worth $825,000 to return to his original team the Washington Capitals on July 1, 2011.

On July 9, 2012, once again as a veteran free agent, Halpern was signed to a one-year deal with the New York Rangers. With the 2012–13 season delayed due to the lockout, Halpern made his debut with the Rangers in the shortened season opener on the fourth line in a defeat against the Boston Bruins on January 19, 2013. In 30 games with the Rangers as a checking line forward, Halpern produced one assist before he was claimed off waivers to return to the Montreal Canadiens on March 23, 2013. For the season, he had a goal and two assists in 46 games for the Rangers and Canadiens.

In 13 NHL seasons at that point he had 147 goals and 214 assists (361 points) in 907 regular-season games. He also had seven goals and 14 points in 39 Stanley Cup playoff games.

On September 16, 2013, Halpern signed a one-year contract with Finnish Elite League team TPS, and was expected to make his SM-liiga debut in October. His contract included an NHL-clause. With the team, he scored four goals in eight games.

On October 12, 2013. Halpern left the Finnish team and signed a one-year, two-way contract with the Phoenix Coyotes. It would pay him $600,000 in the NHL, and $75,000 in the AHL.

== Coaching career ==
On June 27, 2016, the Tampa Bay Lightning announced that Halpern would serve as a full-time assistant coach for the Lightning's AHL affiliate, the Syracuse Crunch.

On June 22, 2018, the Tampa Bay Lightning named Halpern as assistant coach after parting ways with Rick Bowness. As an assistant coach, he won the Stanley Cup with the Lightning in the 2020 and 2021 seasons. On July 7, 2021, Halpern won his second Stanley Cup as an assistant coach with the Tampa Bay Lightning.

== Personal life ==
Halpern, who is Jewish, is a member of the Greater Washington (D.C.) Jewish Sports Hall of Fame. Halpern sat out a game in 2005 to observe Yom Kippur.

He has been married to former cheerleader Kelley Cornwell, a convert to Judaism, since June 2011. The couple have four children.

== Career statistics ==
=== Regular season and playoffs ===
			Regular season					Playoffs
Season	Team	League	GP	G	A	Pts	PIM	GP	G	A	Pts	PIM
1994–95	Stratford Cullitons	MWJHL	44	29	54	83	43	—	—	—	—	—
1995–96	Princeton University	ECAC	29	3	11	14	30	—	—	—	—	—
1996–97	Princeton University	ECAC	33	7	24	31	35	—	—	—	—	—
1997–98	Princeton University	ECAC	36	28	25	53	46	—	—	—	—	—
1998–99	Princeton University	ECAC	33	22	22	44	32	—	—	—	—	—
1998–99	Portland Pirates	AHL	6	2	1	3	4	—	—	—	—	—
1999–2000	Washington Capitals	NHL	79	18	11	29	39	5	2	1	3	0
2000–01	Washington Capitals	NHL	80	21	21	42	60	6	2	3	5	17
2001–02	Washington Capitals	NHL	48	5	14	19	29	—	—	—	—	—
2002–03	Washington Capitals	NHL	82	13	21	34	88	6	0	1	1	2
2003–04	Washington Capitals	NHL	79	19	27	46	56	—	—	—	—	—
2004–05	HC Ajoie	NLB	15	5	12	17	52	—	—	—	—	—
2004–05	Kloten Flyers	NLA	9	7	4	11	6	—	—	—	—	—
2005–06	Washington Capitals	NHL	70	11	33	44	79	—	—	—	—	—
2006–07	Dallas Stars	NHL	76	8	17	25	78	7	2	1	3	4
2007–08	Dallas Stars	NHL	64	10	14	24	40	—	—	—	—	—
2007–08	Tampa Bay Lightning	NHL	19	10	8	18	14	—	—	—	—	—
2008–09	Tampa Bay Lightning	NHL	52	7	9	16	32	—	—	—	—	—
2009–10	Tampa Bay Lightning	NHL	55	9	8	17	27	—	—	—	—	—
2009–10	Los Angeles Kings	NHL	16	0	2	2	12	6	0	0	0	4
2010–11	Montreal Canadiens	NHL	72	11	15	26	29	4	1	0	1	0
2011–12	Washington Capitals	NHL	69	4	12	16	24	2	0	0	0	4
2012–13	New York Rangers	NHL	30	0	1	1	8	—	—	—	—	—
2012–13	Montreal Canadiens	NHL	16	1	1	2	2	3	0	1	1	0
2013–14	TPS	Liiga	8	4	0	4	30	—	—	—	—	—
2013–14	Phoenix Coyotes	NHL	69	5	7	12	24	—	—	—	—	—
NHL totals			976	152	221	373	641	39	7	7	14	31

=== International ===
Year	Team	Event	Result	GP	G	A	Pts	PIM
2000	United States	WC	5th	7	1	1	2	4
2001	United States	WC	4th	9	1	1	2	8
2004	United States	WC	3rd place, bronze medalist(s)	9	2	2	4	4
2004	United States	WCH	4th	4	0	0	0	7
2005	United States	WC	6th	7	1	0	1	6
2008	United States	WC	6th	3	0	1	1	4
Senior totals				39	5	5	10	33

== See also ==
- List of select Jewish ice hockey players

== Awards and honors ==
Award	Year
All-ECAC Hockey Second Team	1997–98
ECAC Hockey All-Tournament Team	1998
All-ECAC Hockey Second Team	1998–99
ECAC Hockey All-Tournament Team	1999
NHL
Stanley Cup champion	2020, 2021

Awards and achievements
Preceded by Jason Elliott	ECAC Hockey Most Outstanding Player in Tournament; 1998	Succeeded by Willie Mitchell
Sporting positions
Preceded by Steve Konowalchuk	Washington Capitals captain 2005–06	Succeeded by Chris Clark
