= Greg Koehler =

Canadian ice hockey player

- Born: February 27, 1975 (age 50) Scarborough, Ontario, Canada
- Height: 6 ft 2 in (188 cm)
- Weight: 195 lb (88 kg; 13 st 13 lb)
- Position: Centre
- Shot: Right
- Played for: Carolina Hurricanes
- NHL draft: Undrafted
- Playing career: 1998–2007

Greg Koehler (born February 27, 1975) is a Canadian former professional ice hockey player. He holds the record for shortest career in the National Hockey League (NHL), a 4-second shift on December 29, 2000, and is the only other skater, besides the New York Islanders' Jeff Libby in 1998, whose NHL career spans just a single shift. The rest of his career, which lasted until 2007, was spent in various minor leagues.

== Biography ==
As a youth, Koehler played in the 1989 Quebec International Pee-Wee Hockey Tournament with the Toronto Marlboros minor ice hockey team. Ken Dryden devoted the second chapter of his 1989 book Home Game to Greg Koehler and his parents when he was the 13-year-old captain of the Marlboros. The chapter, entitled, Playing fields of Scarborough, focuses on the dreams and stresses of players and family in youth hockey.

Koehler played collegiate hockey for the UMass Lowell River Hawks, winning the Hockey East Rookie of the Year award for the 1996-97 season. Going undrafted, Koehler would become a journeyman player in various minor leagues before retiring in 2007. He did, however, get a brief taste of the NHL on December 29, 2000, playing a 4-second shift for the Carolina Hurricanes against the Columbus Blue Jackets that was ended by a penalty as teammate Ron Francis was hooked by Steve Heinze.

As of 2025, Koehler resides in Toronto working as an HVAC technician and playing men’s league hockey. He has a son, Jaxon, and daughter, Lilly.

== Career statistics ==
=== Regular season and playoffs ===
			Regular season					Playoffs
Season	Team	League	GP	G	A	Pts	PIM	GP	G	A	Pts	PIM
1992–93	Niagara Falls Canucks	GHL	40	24	19	43	125	—	—	—	—	—
1993–94	North York Rangers	MetJAHL	49	27	47	74	179	—	—	—	—	—
1994–95	North York Rangers	MetJAHL	48	28	43	71	126	—	—	—	—	—
1995–96	Brampton Capitals	OPJHL	49	33	64	97	87	—	—	—	—	—
1996–97	U Mass-Lowell	HE	37	16	20	36	49	—	—	—	—	—
1997–98	U Mass-Lowell	HE	33	20	17	37	62	—	—	—	—	—
1997–98	Beast of New Haven	AHL	3	0	0	0	2	—	—	—	—	—
1998–99	Beast of New Haven	AHL	26	4	0	4	29	—	—	—	—	—
1998–99	Florida Everblades	ECHL	29	13	14	27	62	6	2	3	5	12
1999–00	Cincinnati Cyclones	IHL	74	12	13	25	157	8	0	3	3	14
2000–01	Carolina Hurricanes	NHL	1	0	0	0	0	—	—	—	—	—
2000–01	Cincinnati Cyclones	IHL	80	35	36	71	122	5	2	2	4	6
2001–02	Lowell Lock Monsters	AHL	56	18	18	36	58	—	—	—	—	—
2001–02	Philadelphia Phantoms	AHL	22	8	4	12	34	5	1	2	3	6
2002–03	Milwaukee Admirals	AHL	43	16	10	26	51	—	—	—	—	—
2002–03	Manchester Monarchs	AHL	13	1	13	14	26	—	—	—	—	—
2003–04	Elmira Jackals	UHL	37	20	26	46	35	—	—	—	—	—
2003–04	Syracuse Crunch	AHL	2	0	0	0	2	—	—	—	—	—
2003–04	San Antonio Rampage	AHL	12	1	2	3	4	—	—	—	—	—
2003–04	Manchester Monarchs	AHL	10	0	2	2	6	4	0	0	0	2
2004–05	Elmira Jackals	UHL	44	26	32	58	96	—	—	—	—	—
2004–05	Adirondack Frostbite	UHL	31	16	24	40	68	6	1	3	4	10
2005–06	Milano Vipers	ITA	8	2	2	4	2	—	—	—	—	—
2005–06	Adirondack Frostbite	UHL	38	20	23	43	84	6	7	2	9	21
2006–07	Chicago Hounds	UHL	38	11	16	27	39	—	—	—	—	—
2006–07	Bloomington Prairie Thunder	UHL	34	4	13	17	42	—	—	—	—	—
AHL totals			187	48	49	97	212	9	1	2	3	8
UHL totals			222	97	134	231	364	12	8	5	13	31
NHL totals			1	0	0	0	0	—	—	—	—	—

== See also ==
- List of players who played only one game in the NHL

Awards and achievements
Preceded by Marty Reasoner	Hockey East Rookie of the Year; 1996–97	Succeeded by Brian Gionta
