= Todd White (ice hockey) =

Canadian ice hockey player

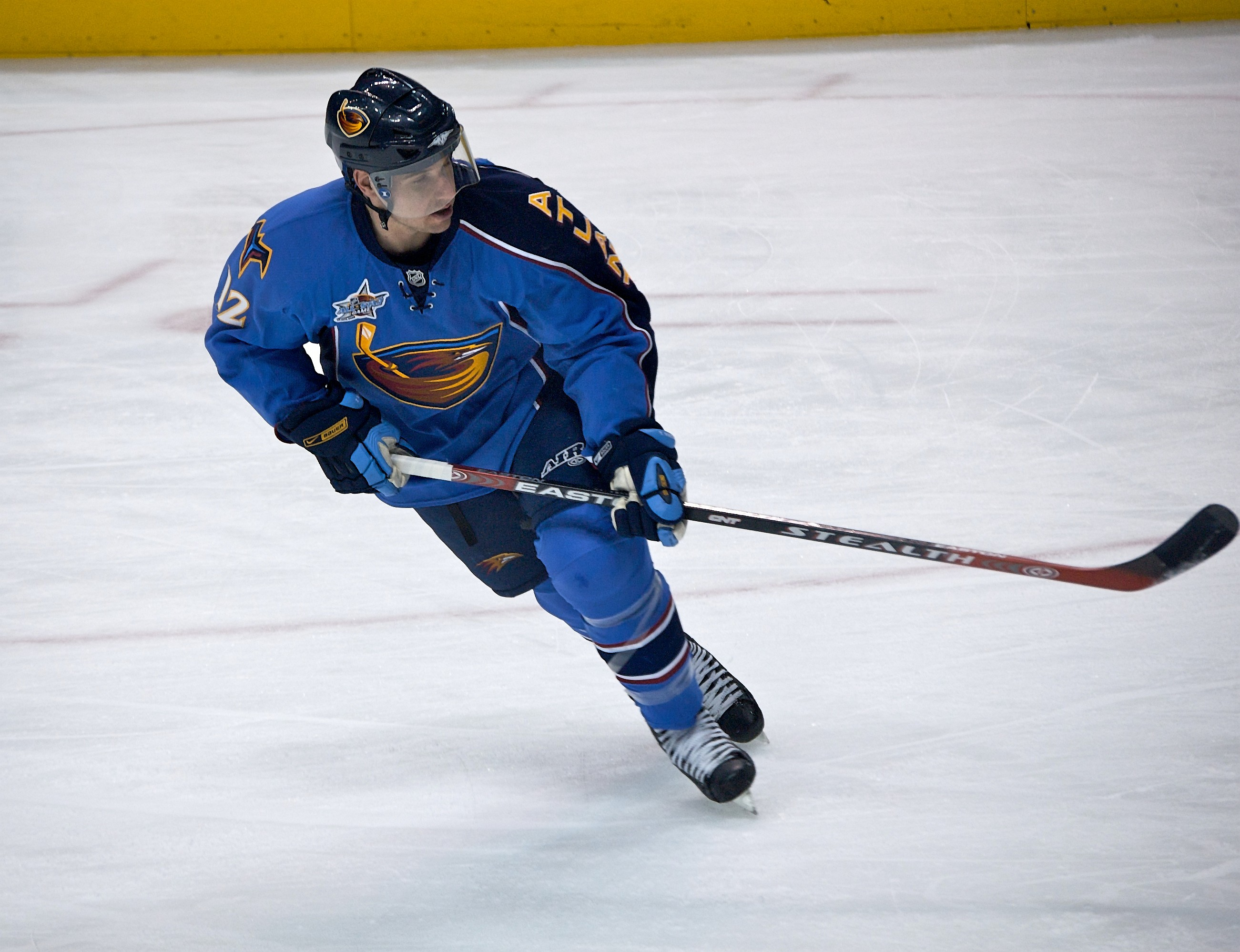
- Born: May 21, 1975 (age 50) Ottawa, Ontario, Canada
- Height: 5 ft 10 in (178 cm)
- Weight: 195 lb (88 kg; 13 st 13 lb)
- Position: Centre
- Shot: Left
- Played for: Chicago Blackhawks; Philadelphia Flyers; Ottawa Senators; Södertälje SK; Minnesota Wild; Atlanta Thrashers; New York Rangers
- Playing career: 1997–2011

Todd White (born May 21, 1975) is a Canadian former professional ice hockey player.

As a hockey player, he played 13 seasons in the National Hockey League (NHL) for the Chicago Blackhawks, Philadelphia Flyers, Ottawa Senators, Minnesota Wild, Atlanta Thrashers and New York Rangers.

After retiring from hockey, he settled in his hometown of Ottawa and operates a mortgage business; he is also a frequent host on local sports radio.

== Playing career ==
White played junior hockey for the Kanata Valley Lasers of the CJHL before heading to Clarkson University on a scholarship. As a senior, he was a finalist for the Hobey Baker Award.

White signed as a free agent with the Chicago Blackhawks on August 6, 1997. That year, he made his NHL debut and scored his first goal. The following year, he played 35 games at the NHL level and scored 13 points. In 1999–2000, Todd played one NHL game with the Blackhawks before being traded on January 26 to the Philadelphia Flyers for a conditional draft pick. He then played three NHL games (one goal) with the Flyers.

On July 12, 2000, White signed as a free agent with the Ottawa Senators. In 16 NHL games that year, he scored four goals. In the post-season, he played his first two playoff games against the Toronto Maple Leafs.

In 2001–02, White joined the NHL ranks full-time. He played in 81 games and scored 20 goals and 50 points. The Senators, however, fell 15 points in the standings and finished third in the Northeast Division. In the playoffs, White scored four points in 12 games as the team reached the second round before losing to the Maple Leafs.

In 2002–03, White finished third on the team with 25 goals and 60 points. He also finished second with 35 assists and a 17.4 shooting percentage. He won the NHL Player of the Month honour for December. In the playoffs, White scored six points in 18 games. On May 19 in game five of the Eastern Conference final, with the Senators down 3–1 in the series, White scored a goal and earned third-star honours in the team's 3–1 victory on home ice.

In 2003–04, White scored 29 points in 53 games as the Senators finished sixth overall in the league standings. In the playoffs, the Senators lost in the opening round against the Maple Leafs. After that season he was traded to the Minnesota Wild for a fourth round draft pick, where he played until 2007 before being signed to a four-year contract with the Atlanta Thrashers.

In the 2008-09 season, White enjoyed his best statistical season to date playing alongside youngster Bryan Little and veteran Slava Kozlov, recording 22 goals along with 51 assists. The trio was known in various hockey circles as the "Little White Russian" line.

On August 2, 2010 White was traded to the New York Rangers for Donald Brashear and Patrick Rissmiller.

== Career statistics ==
			Regular season					Playoffs
Season	Team	League	GP	G	A	Pts	PIM	GP	G	A	Pts	PIM
1990–91	Powassan Passports	NOJHL	38	34	38	72	118	—	—	—	—	—
1991–92	Kanata Valley Lasers	CJHL	55	39	49	88	30	14	9	18	27	12
1992–93	Kanata Valley Lasers	CJHL	49	51	87	138	46	—	—	—	—	—
1993–94	Clarkson University	ECAC	33	10	11	21	28	—	—	—	—	—
1994–95	Clarkson University	ECAC	34	14	16	30	44	—	—	—	—	—
1995–96	Clarkson University	ECAC	38	29	43	72	36	—	—	—	—	—
1996–97	Clarkson University	ECAC	37	38	36	74	22	—	—	—	—	—
1997–98	Indianapolis Ice	IHL	65	46	36	82	28	5	2	3	5	4
1997–98	Chicago Blackhawks	NHL	7	1	0	1	2	—	—	—	—	—
1998–99	Chicago Blackhawks	NHL	35	5	8	13	20	—	—	—	—	—
1998–99	Chicago Wolves	IHL	25	11	13	24	8	10	1	4	5	8
1999–2000	Cleveland Lumberjacks	IHL	42	21	30	51	32	—	—	—	—	—
1999–2000	Chicago Blackhawks	NHL	1	0	0	0	0	—	—	—	—	—
1999–2000	Philadelphia Phantoms	AHL	32	19	24	43	12	5	2	3	5	4
1999–2000	Philadelphia Flyers	NHL	3	1	0	1	0	—	—	—	—	—
2000–01	Grand Rapids Griffins	IHL	64	22	32	54	20	10	4	4	8	10
2000–01	Ottawa Senators	NHL	16	4	1	5	4	2	0	0	0	0
2001–02	Ottawa Senators	NHL	81	20	30	50	24	12	2	2	4	6
2002–03	Ottawa Senators	NHL	80	25	35	60	28	18	5	1	6	6
2003–04	Ottawa Senators	NHL	53	9	20	29	22	7	1	0	1	4
2004–05	Södertälje SK	SEL	1	0	1	1	4	—	—	—	—	—
2005–06	Minnesota Wild	NHL	61	19	21	40	18	—	—	—	—	—
2006–07	Minnesota Wild	NHL	77	13	31	44	24	4	0	0	0	0
2007–08	Atlanta Thrashers	NHL	74	14	23	37	36	—	—	—	—	—
2008–09	Atlanta Thrashers	NHL	82	22	51	73	24	—	—	—	—	—
2009–10	Atlanta Thrashers	NHL	65	7	19	26	24	—	—	—	—	—
2010–11	New York Rangers	NHL	18	1	1	2	2	—	—	—	—	—
2010–11	Connecticut Whale	AHL	9	3	2	5	0	—	—	—	—	—
IHL totals			196	100	111	211	88	25	7	11	18	22
NHL totals			653	141	240	381	228	43	8	3	11	16

== Awards and honours ==
Award	Year
All-ECAC Hockey Second Team	1995–96
AHCA East Second-Team All-American	1995–96
All-ECAC Hockey First Team	1996–97
AHCA East First-Team All-American	1996–97
ECAC Hockey All-Tournament Team	1997

Awards and achievements
Preceded by Éric Perrin	ECAC Hockey Player of the Year; 1996–97	Succeeded by Ray Giroux
