= Jeff Libby =

American ice hockey player (born 1974)

- Born: March 1, 1974 (age 51); Waterville, Maine, U.S.
- Height: 6 ft 3 in (191 cm)
- Weight: 215 lb (98 kg; 15 st 5 lb)
- Position: Defense
- Shot: Left
- Played for: New York Islanders
- NHL draft: Undrafted
- Playing career: 1997–1998

Jeff Libby (born March 1, 1974) is an American former professional ice hockey defenseman.

He played three seasons with the University of Maine before joining the American Hockey League. He played professionally in the International Hockey League with the Utah Grizzlies, the American Hockey League with the Kentucky Thoroughblades and Lowell Lock Monsters, and one game in the National Hockey League with the New York Islanders on March 26, 1998, against the Pittsburgh Penguins.

His career ended on November 7, 1998, after he lost his right eye as a result of it being cut by the skate of Toronto Maple Leafs prospect, Mark Deyell, while playing for the Lowell Lock Monsters.

== Career statistics ==
=== Regular season and playoffs ===
			Regular season					Playoffs
Season	Team	League	GP	G	A	Pts	PIM	GP	G	A	Pts	PIM
1993–94	New Hampton School	HS-NH	—	—	—	—	—	—	—	—	—	—
1994–95	University of Maine	HE	22	2	4	6	6	—	—	—	—	—
1995–96	University of Maine	HE	39	0	9	9	42	—	—	—	—	—
1996–97	University of Maine	HE	34	6	25	31	41	—	—	—	—	—
1997–98	Utah Grizzlies	IHL	47	1	5	6	25	1	0	0	0	0
1997–98	Kentucky Thoroughblades	AHL	8	0	3	3	4	3	0	0	0	4
1997–98	New York Islanders	NHL	1	0	0	0	0	—	—	—	—	—
1998–99	Lowell Lock Monsters	AHL	5	0	0	0	2	—	—	—	—	—
AHL totals			13	0	3	3	6	3	0	0	0	4
IHL totals			47	1	5	6	25	1	0	0	0	0
NHL totals			1	0	0	0	0	—	—	—	—	—

== See also ==
- List of players who played only one game in the NHL
