= 1997 ECAC Hockey men's ice hockey tournament =

1997 ECAC Men's ice hockey tournament
- Dates: March 4–15, 1997
- Teams: 10
- Finals site: Olympic Arena; Lake Placid, New York
- Champions: Cornell (9th title)
- Winning coach: Mike Schafer (2nd title)
- MVP: Jason Elliott (Cornell)
- ECAC Men's Ice Hockey Tournaments

The 1997 ECAC Hockey Men's Ice Hockey Tournament was the 36th tournament in league history. It was played between March 4 and March 15, 1997. Preliminary and quarterfinal games were played at home team campus sites, while the 'final four' games were played at the Olympic Arena (subsequently renamed Herb Brooks Arena) in Lake Placid, New York. By winning the tournament, Cornell received the ECAC's automatic bid to the 1997 NCAA Division I Men's Ice Hockey Tournament.

== Format ==
The tournament featured four rounds of play. The two teams that finish below tenth place in the standings are not eligible for tournament play. In the preliminary round, the seventh and tenth seeds and the eighth and ninth seeds each play a single game to determine the final qualifying teams for the quarterfinals. In the quarterfinals the first seed and lower ranked qualifier, the second and higher ranked qualifier, the third seed and sixth seed and the fourth seed and fifth seed played a modified best-of-three series, where the first team to receive 3 points moves on. After the opening round, every series becomes a single-elimination game. In the semifinals, the highest seed plays the lowest remaining seed while the two remaining teams play with the winners advancing to the championship game and the losers advancing to the third place game. The tournament champion receives an automatic bid to the 1997 NCAA Division I Men's Ice Hockey Tournament.

== Conference standings ==
Note: GP = Games played; W = Wins; L = Losses; T = Ties; PTS = Points; GF = Goals For; GA = Goals Against

1996–97 ECAC Hockey standings
	Conference							Overall					
	GP	W	L	T	PTS	GF	GA	GP	W	L	T	GF	GA
Clarkson†	22	17	5	0	34	94	54	37	27	10	0	154	91
Cornell*	22	14	6	2	30	80	63	35	21	9	5	123	100
Vermont	22	13	6	3	29	67	60	36	22	11	3	125	105
Rensselaer	22	12	7	3	27	83	71	36	20	12	4	137	112
Union	22	11	8	3	25	63	54	34	18	13	3	106	79
Princeton	22	11	8	3	25	70	59	34	18	12	4	111	103
Colgate	22	10	9	3	23	79	79	33	16	14	3	126	124
Harvard	22	9	11	2	20	64	67	32	11	18	3	85	106
St. Lawrence	22	5	12	5	15	78	92	35	10	20	5	121	148
Yale	22	6	14	2	14	61	82	32	10	19	3	90	114
Dartmouth	22	5	15	2	12	75	100	29	10	17	2	105	121
Brown	22	4	16	2	10	81	114	29	7	19	3	108	148
Championship: Cornell † indicates conference regular season champion * indicates conference tournament champion (Whitelaw Cup); Final rankings: USA Today/American Hockey Magazine Coaches Poll Top 10 Poll

== Bracket ==
Teams are reseeded after the first two rounds

Preliminary Round; March 4
7	Colgate	0
10	Yale	1
8	Harvard	4
9	St. Lawrence	2

Quarterfinals; March 7–9
1	Clarkson	5	4	—
10	Yale	2	1	—
2	Cornell	2*	4	—
8	Harvard	2	1	—
3	Vermont	2	7	2
6	Princeton	3	1	3
4	Rensselaer	3	3	—
5	Union	1	1	—

Semifinals; March 14
1	Clarkson	5
6	Princeton	1
2	Cornell	5
4	Rensselaer	3

Championship; March 15
1	Clarkson	1
2	Cornell	2
Third Place
4	Rensselaer	8
6	Princeton	4

Note: * denotes overtime period(s)

=== Preliminary round ===
==== (7) Colgate vs. (10) Yale ====
March 4	Clarkson	0 – 1	Yale	Starr Rink

==== (8) Harvard vs. (9) St. Lawrence ====
March 4	Harvard	4 – 2	St. Lawrence	Bright Hockey Center

=== Quarterfinals ===
==== (1) Clarkson vs. (10) Yale ====
March 7	Clarkson	5 – 2	Yale	Cheel Arena

March 8	Clarkson	4 – 1	Yale	Cheel Arena

Clarkson won series 2–0

==== (2) Cornell vs. (8) Harvard ====
March 7	Cornell	2 – 2	OT	Harvard	Lynah Rink

March 8	Cornell	4 – 1	Harvard	Lynah Rink

Cornell won series 1–0–1

==== (3) Vermont vs. (6) Princeton ====
March 7	Vermont	2 – 3	Princeton	Gutterson Fieldhouse

March 8	Vermont	7 – 1	Princeton	Gutterson Fieldhouse

March 9	Vermont	2 – 3	Princeton	Gutterson Fieldhouse

Princeton won series 2–1

==== (4) Rensselaer vs. (5) Union ====
March 7	Rensselaer	3 – 1	Union	Houston Field House

March 8	Rensselaer	3 – 1	Union	Houston Field House

Rensselaer won series 2–0

=== Semifinals ===
==== (1) Clarkson vs. (6) Princeton ====
March 14	Clarkson	5 – 1	Princeton	Olympic Arena

==== (2) Cornell vs. (4) Rensselaer ====
March 14	Cornell	5 – 3	Rensselaer	Olympic Arena

=== Third place ===
==== (4) Rensselaer vs. (6) Princeton ====
March 15	Rensselaer	8 – 4	Princeton	Olympic Arena

=== Championship ===
==== (1) Clarkson vs. (2) Cornell ====
March 15	Clarkson	1 – 2	Cornell	Olympic Arena

== Tournament awards ==
=== All-Tournament Team ===
- F Todd White (Clarkson)
- F Jean-Francois Houle (Clarkson)
- F Matt Garver (Rensselaer)
- D Steve Wilson (Cornell)
- D Jason Dailey (Cornell)
- G Jason Elliott* (Cornell)

* Most Outstanding Player(s)
