= Ben Clymer =

American ice hockey player (born 1978)

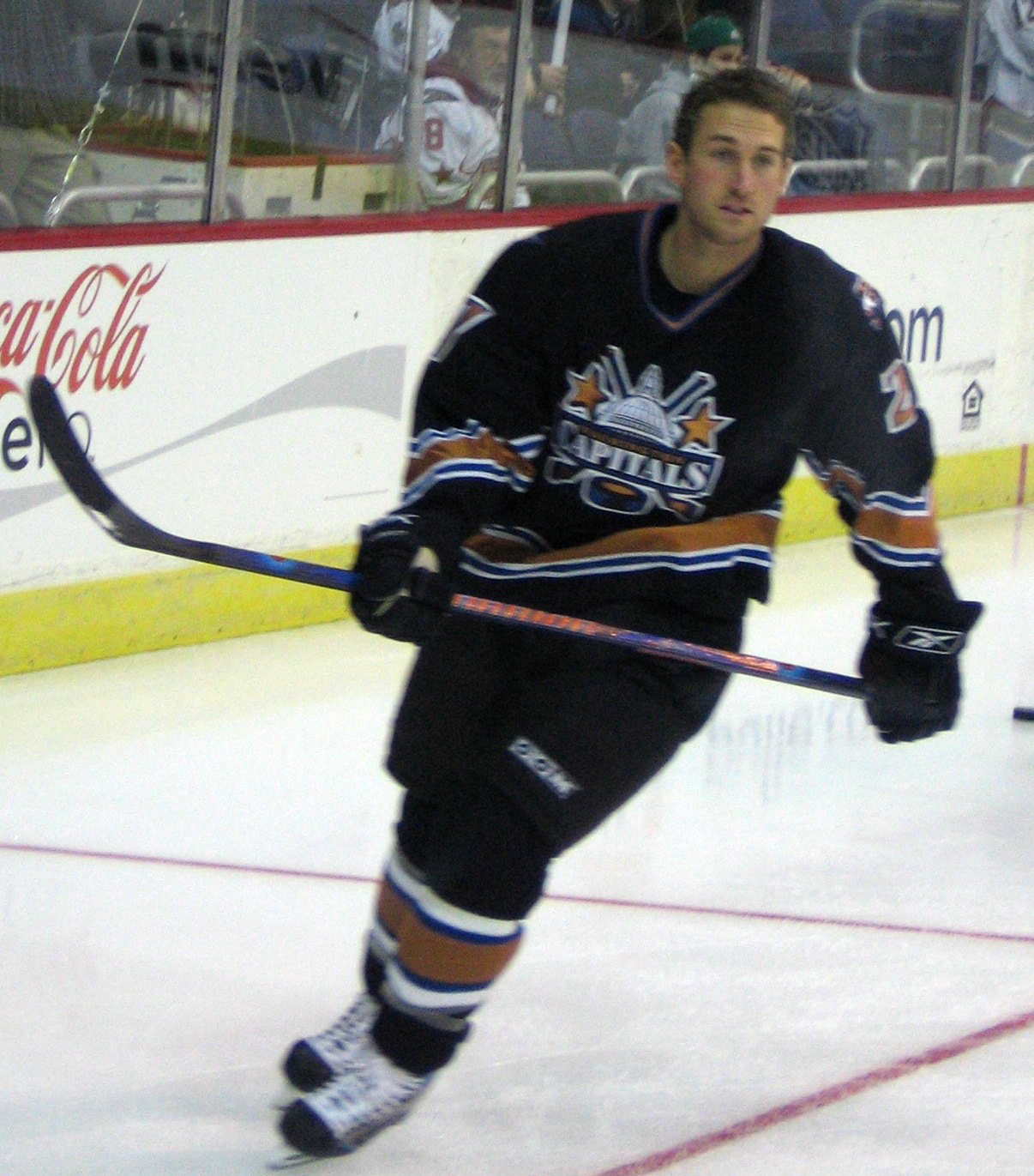
- Born: April 11, 1978 (age 48) Bloomington, Minnesota, U.S.
- Height: 6 ft 1 in (185 cm)
- Weight: 199 lb (90 kg; 14 st 3 lb)
- Position: Defense
- Shot: Right
- Played for: Tampa Bay Lightning; Washington Capitals; HC Dinamo Minsk; ERC Ingolstadt
- National team: United States
- NHL draft: 27th overall, 1997; Boston Bruins
- Playing career: 1999–2010

Ben Andrew Clymer (born April 11, 1978) is an American former professional ice hockey defenseman who played in the National Hockey League with the Tampa Bay Lightning and Washington Capitals. He also played college hockey at the University of Minnesota.

== Playing career ==
Clymer was drafted 27th overall in the 1997 NHL entry draft by the Boston Bruins. He attended and played hockey for Bloomington Jefferson High School and the University of Minnesota. Clymer left school in 1998 to take advantage of a loophole in the NHL CBA which would allow him to become an unrestricted free agent if he was to play one year in the WHL. In this pursuit he joined the Seattle Thunderbirds of the Western Hockey League in 1998–1999 in played 70 games posting 56 points.

Clymer made his NHL debut with the Tampa Bay Lightning the following season (1999), and was part of the 2004 Stanley Cup Championship team. During the NHL lockout, Clymer played with Swiss team EHC Biel in the second Swiss division.

After the lockout, Clymer returned to the NHL, signing a one-year contract with the Washington Capitals on August 8, 2005. The following year he was re-signed to a three-year contract, however spent the final year of his contract in the AHL with the Hershey Bears.

For the 2008–09 season, Clymer left the NHL and signed with the Minsk of the KHL. That season Clymer was named an All-Star and played in the KHL's All-Star game outdoor in Moscow's Red Square. Clymer scored a goal and was a member of the victorious "Team Jagr". Following that season Clymer signed a one-year contract with ERC Ingolstadt.

An integral part of Ingolstadt's defense during the 2009–10 season, Clymer scored 32 points in 37 games before he was again on the move within Europe, signing with HC Lugano of the Swiss Nationalliga A.

Clymer, failed to appear for Lugano in a NLA after suffering a season ending knee injury in training camp. He then returned to Ingolstadt on a one-year contract on May 14, 2011. However, unable to satisfactorily recover from his lingering knee injury, Clymer announced his retirement just over a month later on June 30, 2011.

== Post career ==
Following Clymer's retirement, Clymer enrolled back at the University of Minnesota and was admitted to the Carlson School of Management where he received a degree in Finance. During his retirement Clymer also broke into the broadcast world. In 2009 Clymer was hired by Channel 45 to cover the Minnesota State High School Hockey Tournament. Clymer has continued to annually cover the State High School Tournament for Channel 45 and has also been hired by Fox Sports North to cover Minnesota Golden Gopher and Minnesota Wild games. On September 16, 2013, it was announced that Clymer had joined the Big Ten Network as a college hockey analyst.

== Career statistics ==
=== Regular season and playoffs ===
			Regular season					Playoffs
Season	Team	League	GP	G	A	Pts	PIM	GP	G	A	Pts	PIM
1993–94	Bloomington Jefferson High School	HS-MN	23	3	7	10	20	—	—	—	—	—
1994–95	Bloomington Jefferson High School	HS-MN	28	11	22	33	36	—	—	—	—	—
1995–96	Bloomington Jefferson High School	HS-MN	18	12	34	46	34	5	0	6	6	6
1995–96	Rochester Mustangs	USHL	10	2	8	10	20	—	—	—	—	—
1996–97	University of Minnesota	WCHA	29	7	13	20	64	—	—	—	—	—
1997–98	University of Minnesota	WCHA	1	0	0	0	2	—	—	—	—	—
1998–99	Seattle Thunderbirds	WHL	70	12	44	56	93	11	1	5	6	12
1999–2000	Detroit Vipers	IHL	19	1	9	10	30	—	—	—	—	—
1999–2000	Tampa Bay Lightning	NHL	60	2	6	8	87	—	—	—	—	—
2000–01	Detroit Vipers	IHL	53	5	8	13	88	—	—	—	—	—
2000–01	Tampa Bay Lightning	NHL	23	5	1	6	21	—	—	—	—	—
2001–02	Tampa Bay Lightning	NHL	81	14	20	34	36	—	—	—	—	—
2002–03	Tampa Bay Lightning	NHL	65	6	12	18	57	11	0	2	2	6
2003–04	Tampa Bay Lightning	NHL	66	2	8	10	50	5	0	0	0	0
2004–05	EHC Biel	NLB	19	12	13	25	30	11	6	11	17	24
2005–06	Washington Capitals	NHL	77	16	17	33	72	—	—	—	—	—
2006–07	Washington Capitals	NHL	66	7	13	20	44	—	—	—	—	—
2007–08	Hershey Bears	AHL	50	11	16	27	83	—	—	—	—	—
2008–09	Dinamo Minsk	KHL	49	3	14	17	85	—	—	—	—	—
2009–10	ERC Ingolstadt	DEL	37	8	24	32	70	10	2	3	5	12
NHL totals			438	52	77	129	367	16	0	2	2	6

=== International ===
Year	Team	Event	GP	G	A	Pts	PIM
1996	United States	WJC	6	0	4	4	14
1997	United States	WJC	6	0	2	2	2
2000	United States	WC	7	0	0	0	4
Senior totals			7	0	0	0	4

== Awards and honors ==
Award	Year
All-WCHA Rookie Team	1996–97

== Personal life ==
Clymer has a degree in Finance. He is married.
