= Chris Kelleher =

American ice hockey player

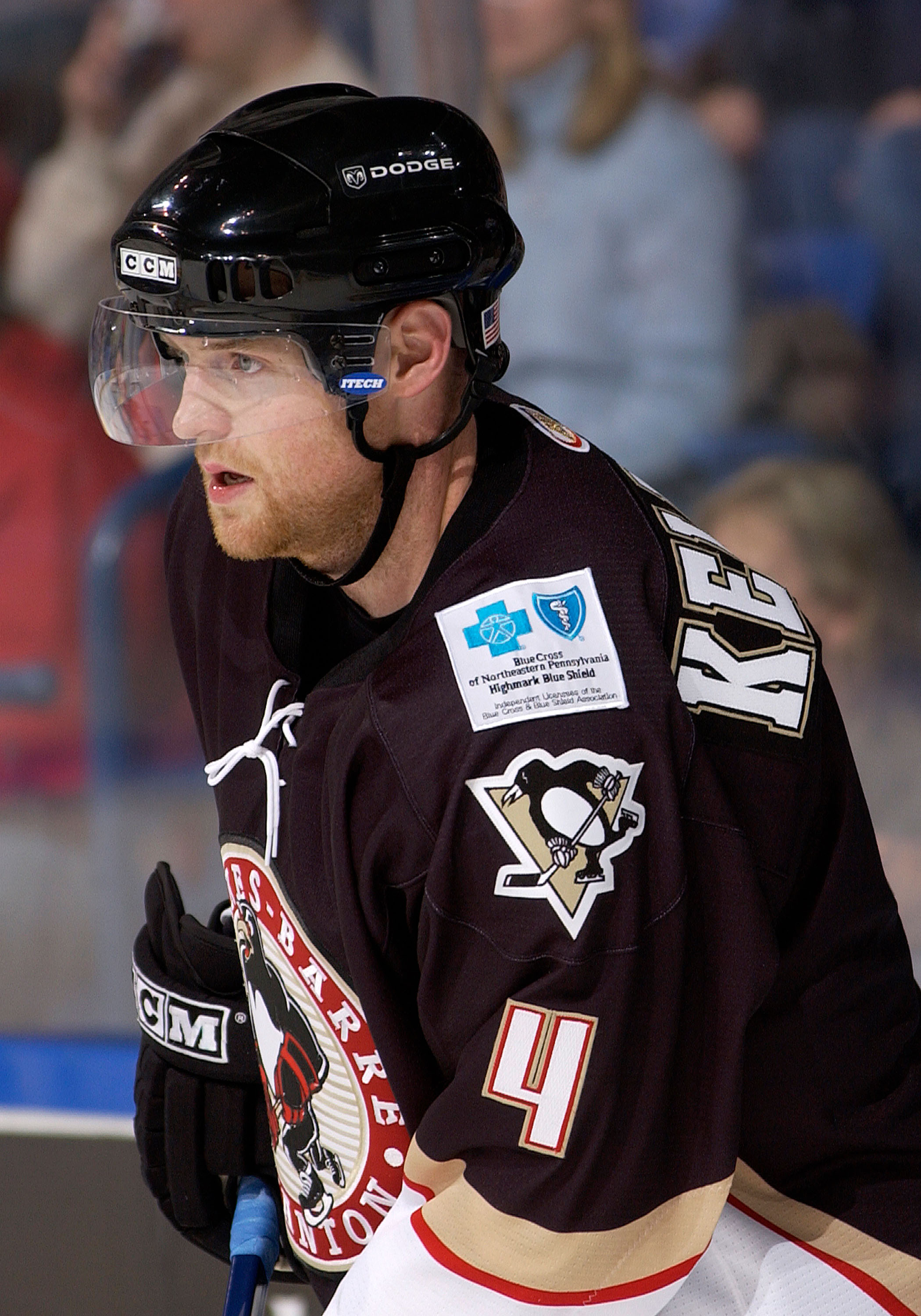
- Kelleher with the Wilkes-Barre/Scranton Penguins in 2004
- Born: March 23, 1975 (age 51) Cambridge, Massachusetts, U.S.
- Height: 6 ft 1 in (185 cm)
- Weight: 215 lb (98 kg; 15 st 5 lb)
- Position: Defense
- Shot: Left
- Played for: Boston Bruins; Krefeld Pinguine; Linköping HC
- National team: United States
- NHL draft: 130th overall, 1993; Pittsburgh Penguins
- Playing career: 1998–2007

Christopher D. Kelleher (born March 23, 1975) is a retired American professional ice hockey defenseman. He played one game in the National Hockey League, with the Boston Bruins on March 16, 2002, against the Detroit Red Wings. The rest of his career, which lasted from 1998 to 2007, was mainly spent in the minor American Hockey League. After retiring he became a scout with the Minnesota Wild.

== Biography ==
As a youth, Kelleher played in the 1989 Quebec International Pee-Wee Hockey Tournament with the Boston Junior Bruins minor ice hockey team.

He later played in one National Hockey League game for the Boston Bruins during the 2001–02 NHL season. He officially retired from professional hockey during the 2006-07 season due to a knee injury.

He is currently Director of Pro Scouting for the Minnesota Wild.

== Career statistics ==
=== Regular season and playoffs ===
			Regular season					Playoffs
Season	Team	League	GP	G	A	Pts	PIM	GP	G	A	Pts	PIM
1990–91	Belmont Hill School	HS-MA	20	4	23	27	14	—	—	—	—	—
1991–92	Saint Sebastian's School	HS-MA	28	7	27	34	12	—	—	—	—	—
1992–93	Saint Sebastian's School	HS-MA	25	8	30	38	16	—	—	—	—	—
1993–94	Saint Sebastian's School	HS-MA	24	10	21	31	—	—	—	—	—	—
1994–95	Boston University	HE	35	3	17	20	62	—	—	—	—	—
1995–96	Boston University	HE	37	7	18	25	43	—	—	—	—	—
1996–97	Boston University	HE	39	10	24	34	54	—	—	—	—	—
1997–98	Boston University	HE	37	4	26	30	40	—	—	—	—	—
1998–99	Syracuse Crunch	AHL	45	1	4	5	43	—	—	—	—	—
1999–00	Wilkes-Barre/Scranton Penguins	AHL	67	0	12	12	40	—	—	—	—	—
2000–01	Wilkes-Barre/Scranton Penguins	AHL	66	6	13	19	37	21	7	18	25	4
2001–02	Boston Bruins	NHL	1	0	0	0	0	—	—	—	—	—
2001–02	Providence Bruins	AHL	31	6	13	19	14	2	0	1	1	0
2002–03	Providence Bruins	AHL	72	8	27	35	50	4	0	1	1	0
2003–04	Krefeld Pinguine	DEL	47	5	16	21	38	—	—	—	—	—
2004–05	Wilkes-Barre/Scranton Penguins	AHL	65	3	18	21	26	11	0	2	2	6
2005–06	Wilkes-Barre/Scranton Penguins	AHL	52	3	26	29	48	11	0	3	3	9
2006–07	Linköping HC	SWE	25	1	4	5	24	—	—	—	—	—
AHL totals			398	27	113	140	258	49	7	25	32	19
NHL totals			1	0	0	0	0	—	—	—	—	—

=== International ===
Year	Team	Event	GP	G	A	Pts	PIM
1995	United States	WJC	7	1	0	1	0
Junior totals			7	1	0	1	0

== Awards and honors ==
Award	Year
All-Hockey East Rookie Team	1994–95
AHCA East Second-Team All-American	1996–97
Hockey East All-Tournament Team	1997
All-Hockey East Second Team	1997–98
AHCA East Second-Team All-American	1997–98

== See also ==
- List of players who played only one game in the NHL
