= Matt Pagnutti =

Canadian ice hockey player

- Born: September 25, 1975 (age 50) Sudbury, Ontario, Canada
- Height: 6 ft 1 in (185 cm)
- Weight: 190 lb (86 kg; 13 st 8 lb)
- Position: Defence
- Shot: Left
- Played for: AHL; Carolina Monarchs; ECHL; Louisiana IceGators; Arkansas RiverBlades; Florida Everblades; IHL; Milwaukee Admirals
- NHL draft: Undrafted
- Playing career: 1997–2005

Matt Pagnutti (born September 25, 1975) is a Canadian former professional ice hockey defenceman who, over eight seasons, played 555 regular season games and 86 playoff games in the ECHL.

Matt's father, Rick Pagnutti, also played professional hockey.

== Career statistics ==
			Regular season					Playoffs
Season	Team	League	GP	G	A	Pts	PIM	GP	G	A	Pts	PIM
1991–92	Barrie Colts	COJHL	38	18	17	35	91	—	—	—	—	—
1992–93	Barrie Colts	COJHL	48	26	37	63	105	—	—	—	—	—
1993–94	Clarkson University	NCAA	32	2	2	4	28	—	—	—	—	—
1994–95	Clarkson University	NCAA	31	4	8	12	30	—	—	—	—	—
1995–96	Clarkson University	NCAA	38	7	9	16	64	—	—	—	—	—
1996–97	Clarkson University	NCAA	37	9	26	35	42	—	—	—	—	—
1996–97	Carolina Monarchs	AHL	1	0	0	0	0	—	—	—	—	—
1997–98	Milwaukee Admirals	IHL	1	0	0	0	0	—	—	—	—	—
1997–98	Louisiana IceGators	ECHL	68	5	15	20	63	12	1	6	7	12
1998–99	Louisiana IceGators	ECHL	64	2	19	21	76	5	0	0	0	4
1999–00	Louisiana IceGators	ECHL	69	6	17	23	109	19	6	2	8	34
2000–01	Louisiana IceGators	ECHL	72	6	18	24	99	13	0	4	4	6
2001–02	Arkansas RiverBlades	ECHL	72	9	37	46	52	—	—	—	—	—
2002–03	Arkansas RiverBlades	ECHL	66	15	43	58	58	3	0	0	0	4
2003–04	Florida Everblades	ECHL	72	11	29	40	57	17	4	6	10	10
2004–05	Florida Everblades	ECHL	72	8	23	31	58	17	2	7	9	14
ECHL totals			555	62	201	263	572	86	13	25	38	84

== Awards and honors ==
Award	Year
All-ECAC Hockey First Team	1996–97
AHCA East First-Team All-American	1996–97

Awards and achievements
Preceded by Jeff Kungle	ECAC Hockey Best Defensive Defenseman; 1996–97; Shared With; Andrew Will	Succeeded by Ray Giroux
