= Marty Reasoner =

American ice hockey player (born 1977)

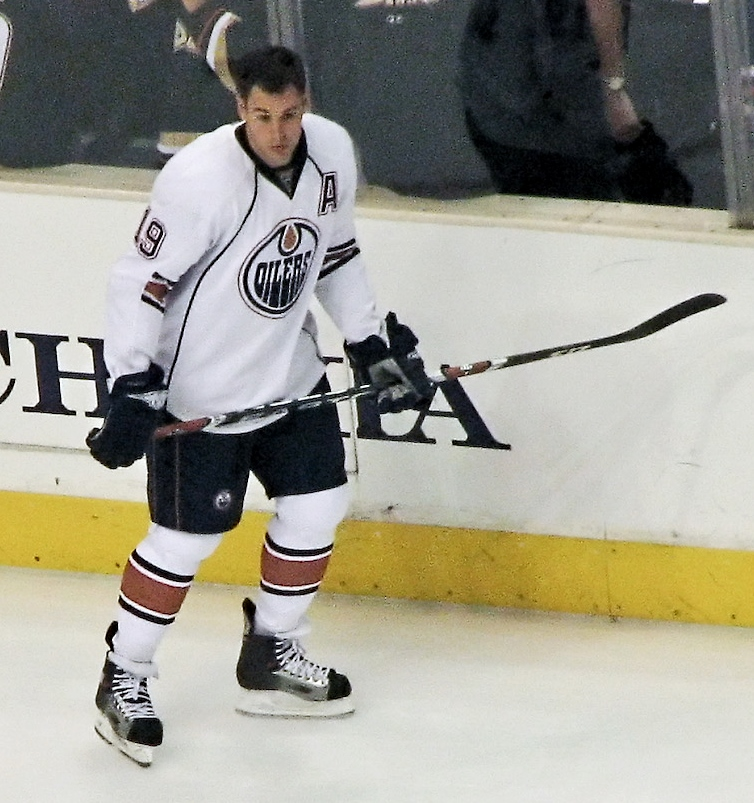
- Born: February 26, 1977 (age 49) Honeoye Falls, New York, U.S.
- Height: 6 ft 1 in (185 cm)
- Weight: 197 lb (89 kg; 14 st 1 lb)
- Position: Center
- Shot: Left
- Played for: St. Louis Blues; Edmonton Oilers; EC Red Bull Salzburg; Boston Bruins; Atlanta Thrashers; Florida Panthers; New York Islanders
- National team: United States
- NHL draft: 14th overall, 1996; St. Louis Blues
- Playing career: 1998–2013

Martin Ernest Reasoner (born February 26, 1977) is an American former professional ice hockey center who played in the National Hockey League (NHL) with the St. Louis Blues, Edmonton Oilers, Boston Bruins, Florida Panthers, Atlanta Thrashers and New York Islanders. He is currently in a player development coaching role within the New York Islanders organization.

== Playing career ==
As a youth, Reasoner played in the 1990 and 1991 Quebec International Pee-Wee Hockey Tournaments with a minor ice hockey team from Rochester, New York.

Reasoner was selected in the first round of the 1996 NHL entry draft, 14th overall, by the St. Louis Blues. This followed two years of high school hockey at McQuaid Jesuit High School, two years of high school at Deerfield Academy in Massachusetts and three years at Boston College (BC), where he was named Rookie of the Year his freshman year, and named All-American his junior season when he led the Eagles ice hockey team to the NCAA finals. He skated alongside BC legend Brian Gionta. Reasoner split 1998–2001 between the Blues and their top minor league affiliate, the Worcester IceCats of the American Hockey League (AHL). In 2003, he was voted a starter on the IceCats' tenth-anniversary All-Time Team.

On July 1, 2001, Reasoner (along with Jochen Hecht and Jan Horacek) was traded to the Edmonton Oilers in exchange for Oilers' captain Doug Weight and Michel Riesen. In November 2003, Reasoner suffered a severe knee injury when he crashed into the end boards. During the 2004–05 NHL lockout, Reasoner played 11 games for EC Red Bull Salzburg of the Austrian League. On August 9, 2005, Reasoner signed a one-year contract extension with the Oilers. On March 9, 2006, Reasoner (along with Yan Stastny and a second-round pick in the 2006 NHL entry draft (used to select Milan Lucic)) was traded to the Boston Bruins in exchange for Sergei Samsonov.

On July 4, 2006, as a free agent, Reasoner signed a two-year contract to return to the Edmonton Oilers. After the expiry of his deal, on July 17, 2008, Reasoner signed a contract with the Atlanta Thrashers. On June 24, 2010, Reasoner (along with the Thrashers' first- (24th overall) and second-round picks in the 2010 NHL entry draft (used to select Joey Crabb and Jeremy Morin respectively)) was traded to the Chicago Blackhawks in exchange for Dustin Byfuglien, Ben Eager, Brent Sopel and Akim Aliu. One month later, on July 22, 2010, due to salary cap restrictions within the Blackhawks' organization, Reasoner was traded to the Florida Panthers in exchange for center Jeff Taffe. After the Panthers traded away captain Bryan McCabe, Reasoner was named an assistant captain.

On July 1, 2011, Reasoner signed a two-year contract with the New York Islanders.

== Career statistics ==
=== Regular season and playoffs ===
			Regular season					Playoffs
Season	Team	League	GP	G	A	Pts	PIM	GP	G	A	Pts	PIM
1993–94	Deerfield Academy	HS-MA	22	27	25	52	—	—	—	—	—	—
1994–95	Deerfield Academy	HS-MA	26	25	32	57	14	—	—	—	—	—
1995–96	Boston College	HE	34	16	29	45	32	—	—	—	—	—
1996–97	Boston College	HE	35	20	24	44	31	—	—	—	—	—
1997–98	Boston College	HE	42	33	40	73	56	—	—	—	—	—
1998–99	St. Louis Blues	NHL	22	3	7	10	8	—	—	—	—	—
1998–99	Worcester IceCats	AHL	44	17	22	39	24	4	2	1	3	6
1999–00	Worcester IceCats	AHL	44	23	28	51	39	—	—	—	—	—
1999–00	St. Louis Blues	NHL	32	10	14	24	20	7	2	1	3	4
2000–01	Worcester IceCats	AHL	34	17	18	35	25	—	—	—	—	—
2000–01	St. Louis Blues	NHL	41	4	9	13	14	10	3	1	4	0
2001–02	Edmonton Oilers	NHL	52	6	5	11	41	—	—	—	—	—
2002–03	Hamilton Bulldogs	AHL	2	0	2	2	2	—	—	—	—	—
2002–03	Edmonton Oilers	NHL	70	11	20	31	28	6	1	0	1	2
2003–04	Edmonton Oilers	NHL	17	2	6	8	10	—	—	—	—	—
2004–05	EC Red Bull Salzburg	EBEL	11	5	4	9	12	—	—	—	—	—
2005–06	Edmonton Oilers	NHL	58	9	17	26	20	—	—	—	—	—
2005–06	Boston Bruins	NHL	19	2	6	8	8	—	—	—	—	—
2006–07	Edmonton Oilers	NHL	72	6	14	20	60	—	—	—	—	—
2007–08	Edmonton Oilers	NHL	82	11	14	25	50	—	—	—	—	—
2008–09	Atlanta Thrashers	NHL	79	14	16	30	36	—	—	—	—	—
2009–10	Atlanta Thrashers	NHL	80	4	13	17	24	—	—	—	—	—
2010–11	Florida Panthers	NHL	82	14	18	32	22	—	—	—	—	—
2011–12	New York Islanders	NHL	61	1	5	6	34	—	—	—	—	—
2012–13	New York Islanders	NHL	31	0	5	5	4	1	0	0	0	17
NHL totals			798	97	169	266	379	24	6	2	8	23

=== International ===
Medal record

Representing United States

World Junior Championships
Silver medal – second place	1997 Geneva	

Year	Team	Event	Result	GP	G	A	Pts	PIM
1996	United States	WJC	5th	6	3	2	5	10
1997	United States	WJC	2nd place, silver medalist(s)	6	1	3	4	4
2002	United States	WC	7th	7	0	1	1	6
2003	United States	WC	13th	6	1	3	4	2
2006	United States	WC	7th	7	0	0	0	8
Junior totals				12	4	5	9	14
Senior totals				20	1	4	5	16

== Awards and honors ==
Award	Year
College
All-Hockey East Rookie Team	1995–96
All-Hockey East All-Star	1996–97
All-Hockey East First Team	1997–98
AHCA East First-Team All-American	1997–98
All-NCAA All-Tournament Team	1998
Hockey East All-Tournament Team	1998

Awards and achievements
Preceded by Mark Mowers	Hockey East Rookie of the Year; 1995–96	Succeeded by Greg Koehler
Preceded by Chris Drury	Hockey East Scoring Champion; 1997–98 (with Tom Nolan)	Succeeded by Jason Krog
Preceded by Michel Larocque	William Flynn Tournament Most Valuable Player; 1998	Succeeded by Blake Bellefeuille
Preceded by Brendan Morrison	NCAA Ice Hockey Scoring Champion; 1997–98	Succeeded by Jason Krog
Sporting positions
Preceded by Jason Marshall	St. Louis Blues first-round draft pick 1996	Succeeded by Christian Backman
