= Randy Robitaille =

Canadian ice hockey player

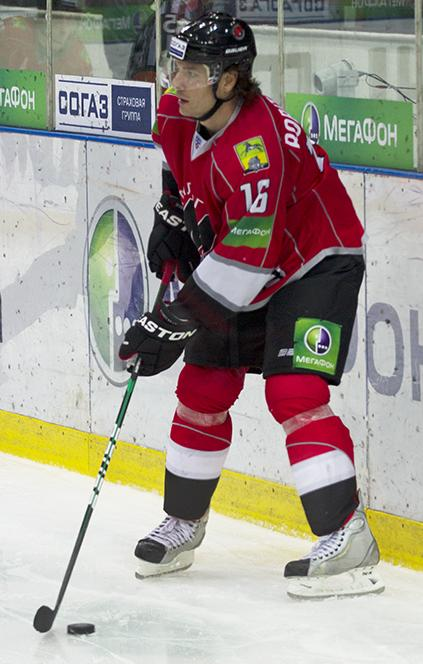
- Born: October 12, 1975 (age 50) Ottawa, Ontario, Canada
- Height: 5 ft 11 in (180 cm)
- Weight: 200 lb (91 kg; 14 st 4 lb)
- Position: Centre
- Shot: Left
- Played for: Boston Bruins; Nashville Predators; Los Angeles Kings; Pittsburgh Penguins; New York Islanders; Atlanta Thrashers; Minnesota Wild; Philadelphia Flyers; Lokomotiv Yaroslavl; Ottawa Senators; Metallurg Novokuznetsk; HC Donbass
- NHL draft: Undrafted
- Playing career: 1993–2014

Randy M. Robitaille (born October 12, 1975) is a Canadian former professional ice hockey player. He last played for HC Donbass of the Kontinental Hockey League. Robitaille has previously played for nine teams in the National Hockey League (NHL).

== Playing career ==
Robitaille first attracted notice playing for the Ottawa Jr. Senators of the CJHL. While not drafted by an NHL team, he was offered a scholarship at Miami University on the basis of his offensive totals. After two solid seasons at Miami, he was signed by the Boston Bruins of the NHL on March 17, 1997. After playing one game straight out of college, he played the next two seasons for the Bruins' AHL affiliate, the Providence Bruins, while playing a few games for the Bruins in between. He also helped Providence to their first Calder Cup win in 1998–99 while winning the Les Cunningham Award as the league's MVP.

On June 25, 1999, the Bruins traded Robitaille to the Atlanta Thrashers for Peter Ferraro. His stay in Atlanta did not last long as they quickly traded him to the Nashville Predators for Denny Lambert on August 16, 1999. While in Nashville, he played mainly in the NHL, only having a few brief stints with the Milwaukee Admirals. In fact, he spent a whole season in the NHL during the 1999–2000 NHL season, a career first. However, following the 2000–01 NHL season, the Predators chose not to re-sign him.

The Los Angeles Kings signed him as a free agent on July 7, 2001. Midway through that season, he was claimed by the Pittsburgh Penguins off waivers on January 4, 2002. Although he played in Pittsburgh for two seasons, he would never play one complete season in the city, as they traded him to the New York Islanders on March 9, 2003, for a draft pick. He completed the season for the Islanders, they chose not to re-sign him, so he became an unrestricted free agent for the first time. On August 12, 2003, he signed a contract that returned him to the Atlanta Thrashers.

During the lockout, he played for Zurich of Nationalliga A, becoming the league's top scorer and league MVP, beating out Joe Thornton and Rick Nash for both awards. Following the ratification of the NHL Collective Bargaining Agreement, he again found himself with the Nashville Predators, having signed a contract with them on August 19, 2005. However, they assigned him to AHL on October 3 and the next day he was claimed off waivers by the Minnesota Wild. After playing the whole season there, he again found himself a free agent.

On July 4, 2006, Robitaille signed a one-year contract with the Philadelphia Flyers. He returned to the Islanders on December 20, 2006, along with a fifth round draft pick for Mike York. When unsigned at the beginning of the 2007–08 season, he chose to sign to play in Russia. After several games, he resigned from the Lokomotiv Yaroslavl team and was signed by the Ottawa Senators on October 16, 2007, for one season.

On August 23, 2008, Robitaille returned to Europe and signed as a free agent to a three-year contract with Swiss team HC Lugano. After a disappointing campaign in 2008-09, Robitaille rebounded nicely in 2009-10, becoming the league's top scorer. However, following a poor playoff performance in which HC Lugano was swept in the first round, Robitaille was informed in April 2010 he was no longer in the Club's future plans, despite him being under contract for the 2010-11 season.

He is not related in any way to former NHL players Luc Robitaille, Mike Robitaille or Louis Robitaille.

== Career statistics ==
			Regular season					Playoffs
Season	Team	League	GP	G	A	Pts	PIM	GP	G	A	Pts	PIM
1993–94	Ottawa Jr. Senators	CJHL	57	33	55	88	31	—	—	—	—	—
1994–95	Ottawa Jr. Senators	CJHL	54	48	77	125	111	17	11	23	34	18
1995–96	Miami Redskins	CCHA	46	14	31	45	26	—	—	—	—	—
1996–97	Miami Redskins	CCHA	39	27	34	61	44	—	—	—	—	—
1996–97	Boston Bruins	NHL	1	0	0	0	0	—	—	—	—	—
1997–98	Providence Bruins	AHL	48	15	29	44	16	—	—	—	—	—
1997–98	Boston Bruins	NHL	4	0	0	0	0	—	—	—	—	—
1998–99	Providence Bruins	AHL	74	28	74	102	34	19	6	14	20	20
1998–99	Boston Bruins	NHL	4	0	2	2	0	1	0	0	0	0
1999–2000	Nashville Predators	NHL	69	11	14	25	10	—	—	—	—	—
2000–01	Milwaukee Admirals	IHL	19	10	23	33	4	—	—	—	—	—
2000–01	Nashville Predators	NHL	62	9	17	26	12	—	—	—	—	—
2001–02	Manchester Monarchs	AHL	6	7	3	10	0	—	—	—	—	—
2001–02	Los Angeles Kings	NHL	18	4	3	7	17	—	—	—	—	—
2001–02	Pittsburgh Penguins	NHL	40	10	20	30	16	—	—	—	—	—
2002–03	Pittsburgh Penguins	NHL	41	5	12	17	8	—	—	—	—	—
2002–03	New York Islanders	NHL	10	1	2	3	2	5	1	1	2	0
2003–04	Atlanta Thrashers	NHL	69	11	26	37	20	—	—	—	—	—
2004–05	ZSC Lions	NLA	36	22	45	67	56	15	2	17	19	10
2005–06	Minnesota Wild	NHL	67	12	28	40	54	—	—	—	—	—
2006–07	Philadelphia Flyers	NHL	28	5	12	17	22	—	—	—	—	—
2006–07	New York Islanders	NHL	50	6	17	23	22	5	0	2	2	8
2007–08	Lokomotiv Yaroslavl	RSL	14	3	5	8	10	—	—	—	—	—
2007–08	Ottawa Senators	NHL	68	10	19	29	18	2	0	1	1	0
2008–09	HC Lugano	NLA	30	1	27	28	10	7	2	1	3	22
2009–10	HC Lugano	NLA	50	16	49	65	72	3	0	1	1	30
2010–11	San Antonio Rampage	AHL	28	5	14	19	8	—	—	—	—	—
2011–12	Metallurg Novokuznetsk	KHL	53	13	13	26	52	—	—	—	—	—
2012–13	Metallurg Novokuznetsk	KHL	38	9	24	33	38	—	—	—	—	—
2012–13	HC Donbass	KHL	11	4	5	9	8	—	—	—	—	—
2013–14	HC Donbass	KHL	49	8	20	28	55	5	0	0	0	0
NHL totals			531	84	172	256	201	13	1	4	5	8
KHL totals			151	34	62	96	153	5	0	0	0	0

== Awards and honours ==
Award	Year
All-CCHA Rookie Team	1995-96
All-CCHA First Team	1996–97
AHCA West First-Team All-American	1996–97
