= Raymond Giroux =

Canadian ice hockey player (born 1976)

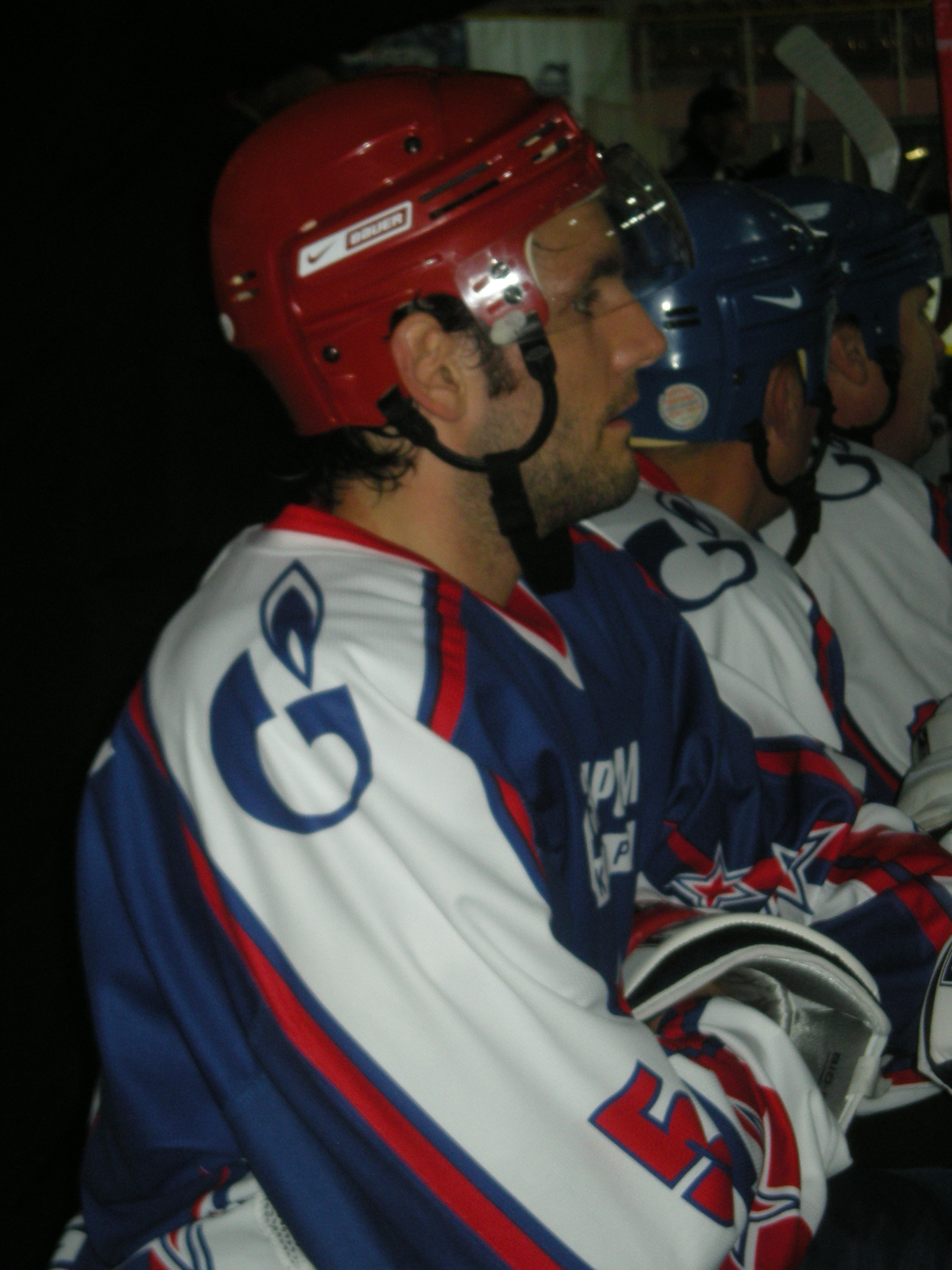
- Born: July 20, 1976 (age 48); North Bay, Ontario, Canada
- Height: 6 ft 1 in (185 cm)
- Weight: 190 lb (86 kg; 13 st 8 lb)
- Position: Defence
- Shot: Left
- Played for: New York Islanders; AIK Hockey; HIFK; Jokerit; New Jersey Devils; Ak Bars Kazan; SKA Saint Petersburg; Traktor Chelyabinsk; Metallurg Novokuznetsk
- NHL draft: 202nd overall, 1994; Philadelphia Flyers
- Playing career: 1998–2014

Raymond "Ray" Giroux (born July 20, 1976) is a former Canadian professional ice hockey defenceman who played four seasons in the National Hockey League (NHL) for the New York Islanders and New Jersey Devils.

Giroux played collegiately at Yale University. During the 1997–98 season, he captained the best team in school history as Yale won their first ECAC regular season title (Yale has since won another regular season title in the 2008-09 season) and advanced to the NCAA tournament after only having been picked to finish in 10th place at the beginning of the season. In addition to being a 1st-team All American, Giroux was named ECAC Player of the Year as well as the league's best offensive defenceman and was one of ten finalists for the Hobey Baker Memorial Award, given annually to the nation's top collegiate player.

Giroux spent time in many NHL organizations before leaving the US to play overseas. He has played in the American Hockey League (AHL) for the Lowell Lock Monsters, Bridgeport Sound Tigers, Albany River Rats, and Houston Aeros.

Playing for Ak Bars he became Russian champion (2005/06) and IIHF European Champions Cup winner (2007). Giroux made his Kontinental Hockey League (KHL) debut playing with SKA Saint Petersburg during the inaugural 2008–09 KHL season. He participated in 2009 Kontinental Hockey League All-Star Game.

== Career statistics ==
			Regular season					Playoffs
Season	Team	League	GP	G	A	Pts	PIM	GP	G	A	Pts	PIM
1992–93	North Bay Trappers Midget AAA	GNML	45	8	18	26	117	—	—	—	—	—
1993–94	Powassan Hawks	NOJHL	36	10	40	50	42	9	2	11	13	20
1994–95	Yale University	ECAC	27	1	3	4	8	—	—	—	—	—
1995–96	Yale University	ECAC	30	3	17	20	36	—	—	—	—	—
1996–97	Yale University	ECAC	32	9	12	21	38	—	—	—	—	—
1997–98	Yale University	ECAC	35	9	30	39	62	—	—	—	—	—
1998–99	Lowell Lock Monsters	AHL	59	13	19	32	92	3	1	1	2	0
1999–00	New York Islanders	NHL	14	0	9	9	10	—	—	—	—	—
1999–00	Lowell Lock Monsters	AHL	49	12	21	33	34	7	0	0	0	2
2000–01	HIFK	SM-l	22	3	9	12	34	—	—	—	—	—
2000–01	AIK	SEL	9	0	1	1	16	—	—	—	—	—
2000–01	Jokerit	SM-l	24	4	9	13	16	5	0	0	0	0
2001–02	New York Islanders	NHL	2	0	0	0	2	—	—	—	—	—
2001–02	Bridgeport Sound Tigers	AHL	79	13	40	53	73	19	1	7	8	20
2002–03	New Jersey Devils	NHL	11	0	1	1	6	—	—	—	—	—
2002–03	Albany River Rats	AHL	67	11	38	49	49	—	—	—	—	—
2003–04	New Jersey Devils	NHL	11	0	3	3	4	4	0	0	0	0
2003–04	Albany River Rats	AHL	65	11	17	28	34	—	—	—	—	—
2004–05	Houston Aeros	AHL	70	13	20	33	54	5	0	0	0	13
2005–06	Ak Bars Kazan	RSL	46	9	11	20	56	13	3	8	11	14
2006–07	Ak Bars Kazan	RSL	50	13	26	39	83	16	3	5	8	22
2007–08	Ak Bars Kazan	RSL	57	13	21	34	61	10	2	2	4	2
2008–09	SKA St. Petersburg	KHL	54	2	13	15	38	3	0	0	0	0
2009–10	SKA St. Petersburg	KHL	51	3	11	14	42	4	0	1	1	0
2010–11	Traktor Chelyabinsk	KHL	37	4	11	15	52	—	—	—	—	—
2011–12	Traktor Chelyabinsk	KHL	48	5	13	18	30	14	0	2	2	12
2012–13	HC Ambrì–Piotta	NLA	4	0	0	0	2	1	0	0	0	0
2013–14	Metallurg Novokuznetsk	KHL	48	1	9	10	14	—	—	—	—	—
AHL totals			389	73	155	228	336	34	2	8	10	35
NHL totals			38	0	13	13	22	4	0	0	0	4
KHL totals			238	15	57	72	176	21	0	3	3	12

== Awards and honours ==
Award	Year
All-ECAC Hockey Second Team	1996–97
All-ECAC Hockey First Team	1997–98
AHCA East First-Team All-American	1997–98

Awards and achievements
Preceded by Todd White	ECAC Hockey Player of the Year; 1997–98	Succeeded by Eric Heffler
Preceded by Matt Pagnutti / Andrew Will	ECAC Hockey Best Defensive Defenseman; 1997–98	Succeeded by Jeff Burgoyne
