= Mark Mowers =

American ice hockey player and scout

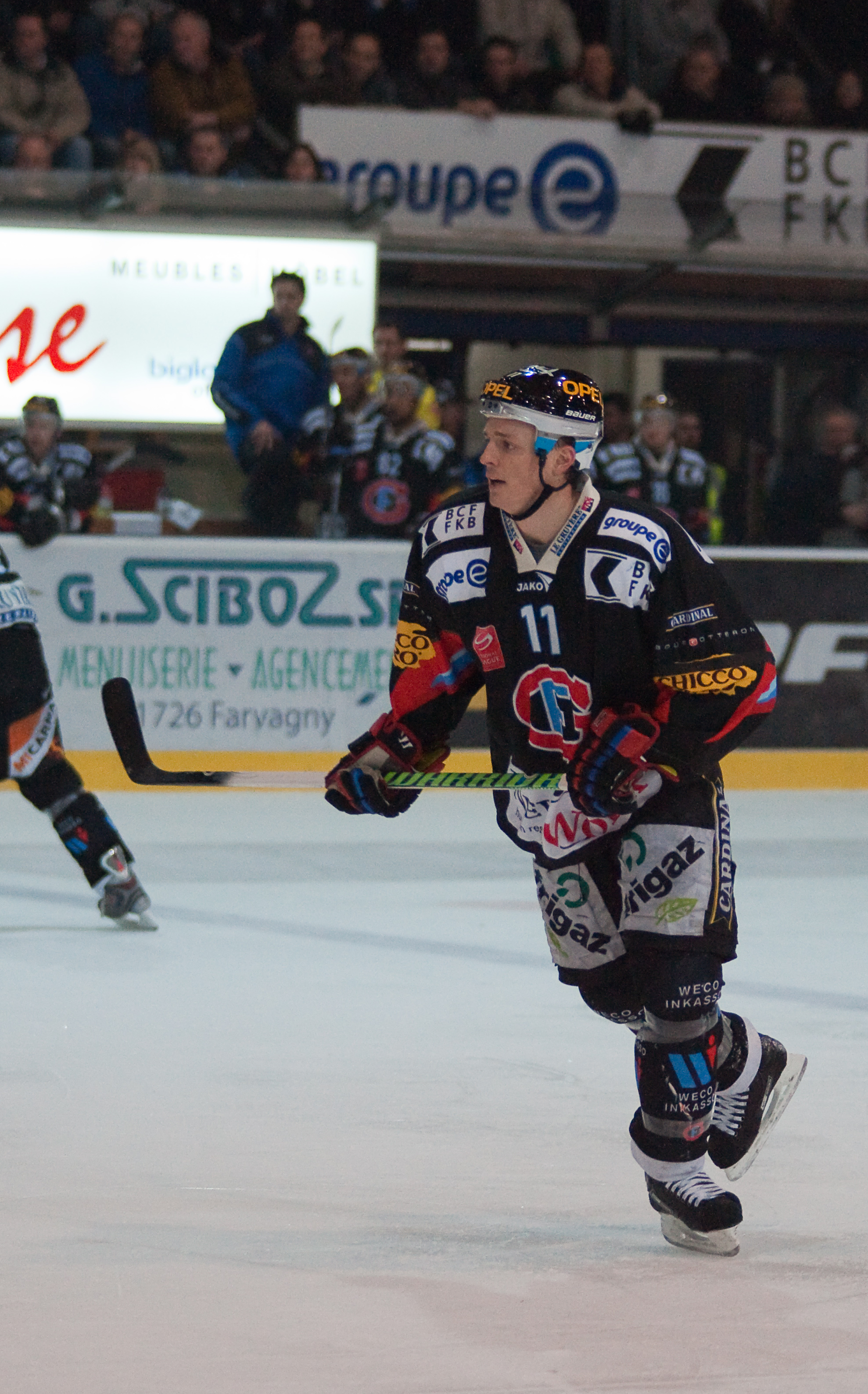
- Born: February 16, 1974 (age 52) Decatur, Georgia, U.S.
- Height: 5 ft 11 in (180 cm)
- Weight: 174 lb (79 kg; 12 st 6 lb)
- Position: Center
- Shot: Right
- Played for: Nashville Predators; Detroit Red Wings; Malmö Redhawks; HC Fribourg-Gottéron; Boston Bruins; Anaheim Ducks; SC Bern
- National team: United States
- NHL draft: Undrafted
- Playing career: 1998–2011

Mark C. Mowers (born February 16, 1974) is an American former professional ice hockey forward and current pro scout for the Minnesota Wild. He had previously played in the National Hockey League (NHL) with the Nashville Predators, Detroit Red Wings, Boston Bruins, and Anaheim Ducks.

== Playing career ==
Undrafted, Mowers played collegiate hockey at the University of New Hampshire. Mowers played for the Whitesboro Warriors high school hockey team in Whitestown, New York, graduating from Whitesboro High School. After his senior year, in which he was named to the East First All-American Team, Mowers was signed as a free agent by the Nashville Predators on August 1, 1998.

Mowers made his NHL debut in the 1998–99 season, his first pro season, with the Predators. Mowers played in 30 games with the Preds and split the season with their affiliate, the Milwaukee Admirals. Mowers spent the next three seasons with the Predators.

On August 6, 2002, Mowers signed a contract with the Detroit Red Wings. Mowers was assigned to the Grand Rapids Griffins for the 2002–03 season and scored 81 points in 78 games, to earn a spot on the AHL All-Star Second Team. In the following 2003–04 season, Mowers started the year with the Griffins before he was recalled by the Red Wings on November 19, 2003. Mowers impressed in a checking line role and established a regular place on the team. Mowers suffered a foot injury towards the end of the season and missed the playoffs.

During the 2004 NHL Lockout, Mowers played with the Malmö Redhawks of the SEL and Swiss team Fribourg-Gottéron. Mowers returned to the Red Wings for the 2005–06 season and was used as a reserve forward, playing in 46 games.

On July 6, 2006, Mowers signed a two-year contract with the Boston Bruins, following former Red Wings head coach Dave Lewis. Mowers played in a career-high 78 games in the 2006–07 season and posted 17 points.

Prior to the 2007–08 season, on September 24, 2007, Mowers was traded by the Bruins to the Anaheim Ducks for Brett Skinner and Nathan Saunders. Mark played in 17 games with the Ducks and accepted a loan to SC Bern of the NLA for the remainder of the season on November 30.

Mowers returned to his former Swiss team, Fribourg-Gottéron, for the 2008–09 season and played three more professional seasons in the NLA before ending his playing career after the 2010–11 season.

== Post-retirement ==
Mowers first foray into sportscasting was doing intermission broadcasts during Boston Bruins games on New England Sports Network. On August 17, 2012, Mowers was named pro scout of the NHL's Eastern Conference for the Montreal Canadiens. Mowers remained a scout with the Canadiens for the following five seasons before leaving to accept the same role with the Buffalo Sabres for the 2017–18 season. Mowers is now with the Minnesota Wild as of July 2019 as a pro scout.

== Personal ==
Mowers was born in Decatur, Georgia, but grew up in Whitesboro, New York. He is married to former UNH gymnast Jana (Reardon) Mowers and lives in Newton, New Hampshire.

== Career statistics ==
=== Regular season and playoffs ===
			Regular season					Playoffs
Season	Team	League	GP	G	A	Pts	PIM	GP	G	A	Pts	PIM
1993–94	Dubuque Fighting Saints	USHL	47	51	31	82	52	—	—	—	—	—
1994–95	U. of New Hampshire	HE	36	13	23	36	16	—	—	—	—	—
1995–96	U. of New Hampshire	HE	34	21	26	47	18	—	—	—	—	—
1996–97	U. of New Hampshire	HE	39	26	32	58	52	—	—	—	—	—
1997–98	U. of New Hampshire	HE	35	25	31	56	32	—	—	—	—	—
1998–99	Nashville Predators	NHL	30	0	6	6	4	—	—	—	—	—
1998–99	Milwaukee Admirals	IHL	51	14	22	36	24	1	0	0	0	0
1999–00	Milwaukee Admirals	IHL	23	11	15	26	34	—	—	—	—	—
1999–00	Nashville Predators	NHL	41	4	5	9	10	—	—	—	—	—
2000–01	Milwaukee Admirals	IHL	63	25	25	50	54	5	1	2	3	2
2001–02	Nashville Predators	NHL	14	1	2	3	2	—	—	—	—	—
2001–02	Milwaukee Admirals	AHL	45	19	20	39	34	—	—	—	—	—
2002–03	Grand Rapids Griffins	AHL	78	34	47	81	47	15	3	4	7	4
2003–04	Grand Rapids Griffins	AHL	16	8	6	14	4	—	—	—	—	—
2003–04	Detroit Red Wings	NHL	52	3	8	11	4	—	—	—	—	—
2004–05	Malmö Redhawks	SEL	9	2	0	2	0	—	—	—	—	—
2004–05	HC Fribourg-Gottéron	NLA	3	2	0	2	0	—	—	—	—	—
2005–06	Detroit Red Wings	NHL	46	4	11	15	16	3	0	0	0	0
2006–07	Boston Bruins	NHL	78	5	12	17	26	—	—	—	—	—
2007–08	Anaheim Ducks	NHL	17	1	0	1	8	—	—	—	—	—
2007–08	SC Bern	NLA	10	2	4	6	8	—	—	—	—	—
2008–09	HC Fribourg-Gottéron	NLA	23	3	8	11	26	5	2	2	4	4
2009–10	HC Fribourg-Gottéron	NLA	42	13	25	38	20	7	3	2	5	6
2010–11	HC Fribourg-Gottéron	NLA	28	6	8	14	38	1	0	0	0	0
NHL totals			278	18	44	62	70	3	0	0	0	0

=== International ===
Year	Team	Event	Result	GP	G	A	Pts	PIM
2002	United States	WC	7th	7	1	2	3	4
Senior totals				7	1	2	3	4

== Awards and honors ==
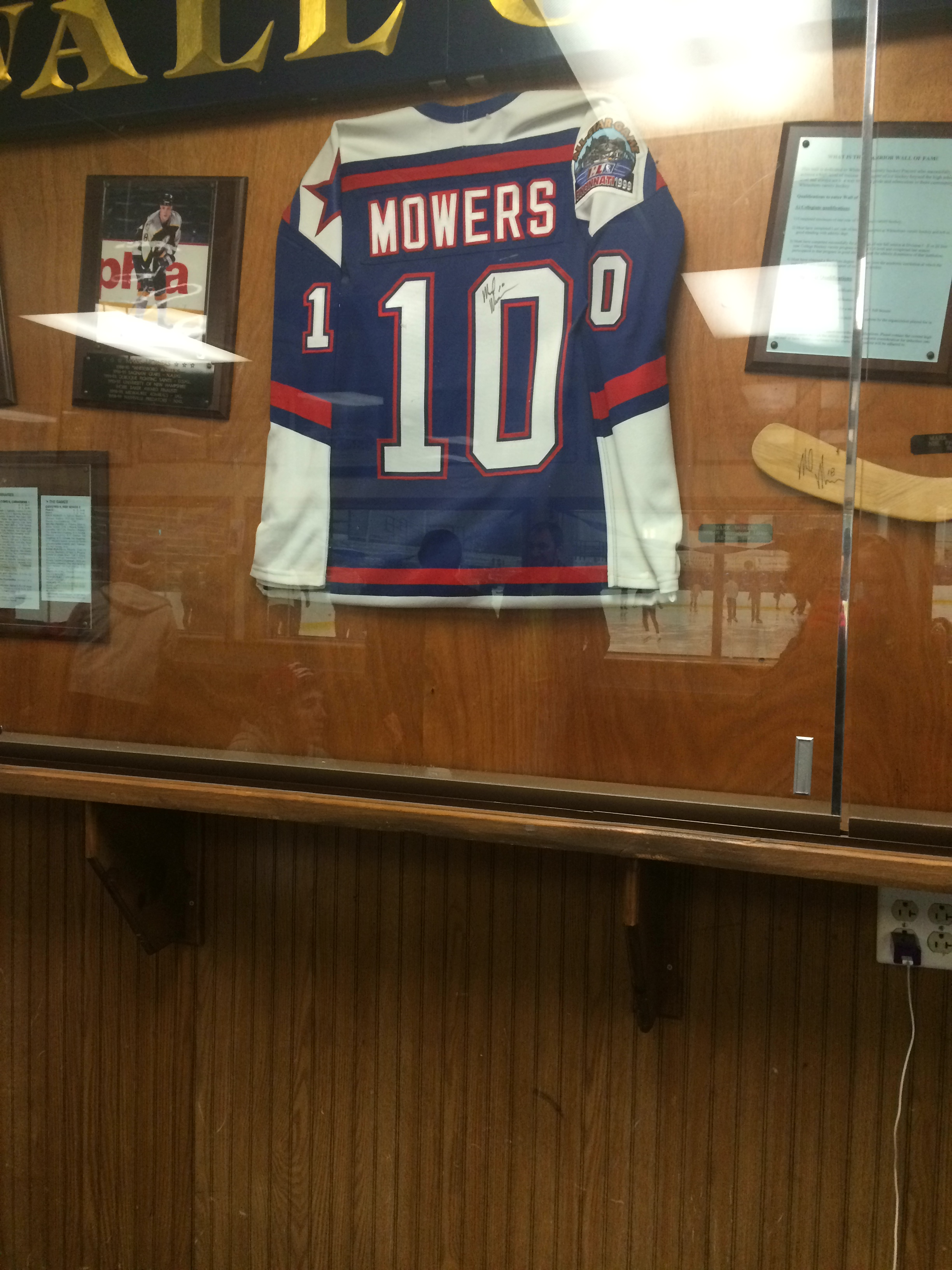
Mark's jersey inside the Wall of Fame case in the Whitestown Ice Rink

Award	Year
College
All-HE Rookie Team	1995
HE Rookie of the Year	1995
New England Rookie of the Year	1995
All-HE All-Star	1996, 1997
HE All-Tournament Team	1997
All-HE Second Team	1998
AHCA East First-Team All-American	1998
Hobey Baker Award (Finalist)	1998
IHL
Ken McKenzie Trophy	1999
AHL
All-Star Game	2003
Second All-Star Team	2003

Awards and achievements
Preceded by Greg Bullock	Hockey East Rookie of the Year; 1994–95	Succeeded by Marty Reasoner
