= Michel Larocque (ice hockey, born 1976) =

- Born: October 3, 1976 (age 48); Lahr, West Germany
- Height: 5 ft 11 in (180 cm)
- Weight: 198 lb (90 kg; 14 st 2 lb)
- Position: Goaltender
- Caught: Left
- Played for: Chicago Blackhawks
- NHL draft: 137th overall, 1996; San Jose Sharks
- Playing career: 1999–2001

Michel Larocque (born October 3, 1976) is a German-born Canadian former professional ice hockey goaltender who played three games in the National Hockey League (NHL) with the Chicago Blackhawks during the 2000–01 season.

== Career statistics ==
=== Regular season and playoffs ===
			Regular season									Playoffs
Season	Team	League	GP	W	L	T	MIN	GA	SO	GAA	SV%	GP	W	L	MIN	GA	SO	GAA	SV%
1993–94	Melfort Mustangs	SJHL	30	—	—	—	—	—	—	2.64	—	—	—	—	—	—	—	—	—
1994–95	Melfort Mustangs	SJHL	61	—	—	—	—	—	—	3.58	—	—	—	—	—	—	—	—	—
1995–96	Boston University	HE	14	10	1	1	735	42	0	3.43	.884	—	—	—	—	—	—	—	—
1996–97	Boston University	HE	24	16	4	4	1466	58	0	2.37	.911	—	—	—	—	—	—	—	—
1997–98	Boston University	HE	24	17	4	1	1370	50	1	2.19	.912	—	—	—	—	—	—	—	—
1998–99	Boston University	HE	35	14	18	3	2072	117	0	3.39	.894	—	—	—	—	—	—	—	—
1999–00	Cleveland Lumberjacks	IHL	1	0	0	1	60	2	0	2.00	.950	—	—	—	—	—	—	—	—
1999–00	Wilkes-Barre/Scranton Penguins	AHL	13	5	6	1	727	34	0	2.81	.911	—	—	—	—	—	—	—	—
1999–00	Saint John Flames	AHL	4	2	1	1	243	8	0	1.98	.921	—	—	—	—	—	—	—	—
1999–00	Greensboro Generals	ECHL	4	1	3	0	229	20	0	5.24	.852	—	—	—	—	—	—	—	—
2000–01	Chicago Blackhawks	NHL	3	0	2	0	152	9	0	3.55	.847	—	—	—	—	—	—	—	—
2000–01	Norfolk Admirals	AHL	35	13	17	4	2087	96	2	2.76	.898	5	2	3	304	13	0	2.57	.912
NHL totals			3	0	2	0	152	9	0	3.55	.847	—	—	—	—	—	—	—	—

== Awards and honours ==
Award	Year
All-Hockey East Rookie Team	1995–96
Hockey East All-Tournament Team	1997
All-Hockey East Second Team	1997–98
All-Hockey East First Team	1998–99
AHCA East Second-Team All-American	1998–99

Awards and achievements
Preceded by Joe Hulbig	William Flynn Tournament Most Valuable Player; 1997	Succeeded by Marty Reasoner
Preceded by Tom Noble	Hockey East Goaltending Champion; 1996–97, 1997–98	Succeeded by Ty Conklin
