= Eric Healey =

American ice hockey player (born 1975)

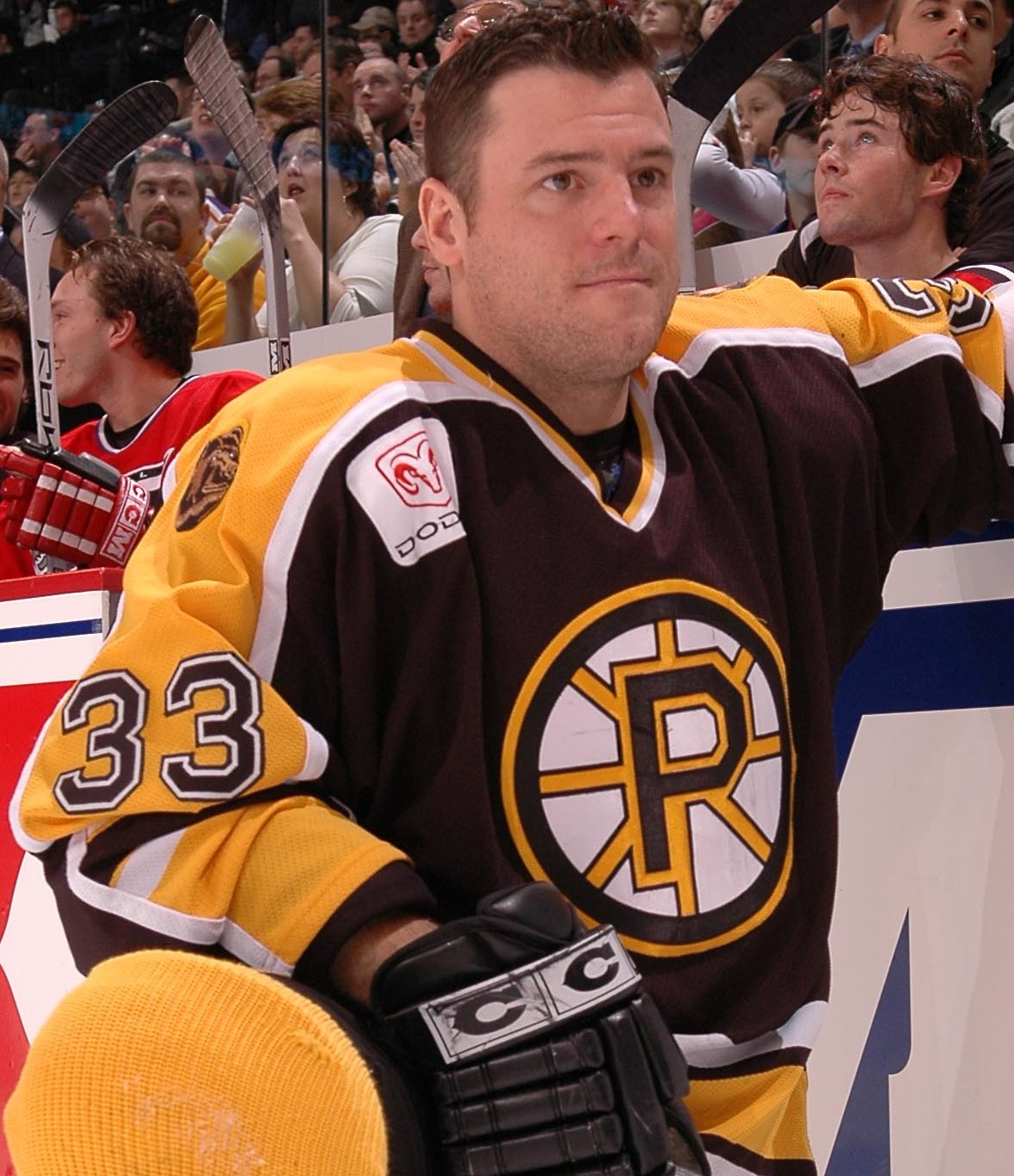
- Healey with the Providence Bruins in 2006
- Born: January 20, 1975 (age 51) Hull, Massachusetts, U.S.
- Height: 5 ft 11 in (180 cm)
- Weight: 201 lb (91 kg; 14 st 5 lb)
- Position: Left wing
- Shot: Left
- Played for: Boston Bruins; Adler Mannheim; SCL Tigers; Graz 99ers EHC Black Wings Linz
- NHL draft: Undrafted
- Playing career: 1998–2010

Eric M. Healey (born January 20, 1975) is an American retired professional ice hockey player. He most last played with EHC Black Wings Linz of the Austrian EBEL and had formerly played in the National Hockey League with the Boston Bruins, appearing in 2 games during the 2005–06 season.

== Playing career ==
Undrafted, Healey was a product of the ECAC's R.P.I. Engineers. He spent four successful years with the Engineers, capturing All-Conference and All-American Honours before signing with the Calgary Flames on September 22, 1998.

Healey split his first pro year with the Flames AHL affiliate the Saint John Flames, and their IHL affiliate the Orlando Solar Bears. In the following summer on July 26, 1999, Healey signed with the Phoenix Coyotes and played for their affiliate, the Springfield Falcons for two seasons. On September 4, 2002, Healey then signed with the Los Angeles Kings, making his mark with the Manchester Monarchs of the AHL with 73 points in 75 games in the 2002–03 season.

Eric then signed with the Atlanta Thrashers to a one-year deal on August 12, 2003. He was however again unable to break into the NHL, playing with farm team the Chicago Wolves. He spent the 2004–05 season abroad with German side the Adler Mannheim.

Healey then returned to North America in the following 2005–06 season and signed with the Boston Bruins on August 15, 2005. He again played primarily in the AHL with the Providence Bruins impressing enough to finally debut in the NHL with the Bruins on November 25, 2005. Healey was also selected as Captain to play for PlanetUSA in the AHL All-Star game.

Considered a career minor-league player, Healey was signed as a free agent on July 15, 2006, by the Tampa Bay Lightning to play for their affiliate, and previous team, the Springfield Falcons. Healey enjoyed his most productive season to date scoring 75 points for the Falcons. The following 2007–08 season, Healey was signed on July 13, 2007, to the Colorado Avalanche. He was assigned to captain the inaugural team of the Lake Erie Monsters of the AHL. Healey led the team in assists (36) and points (58) at the conclusion of the season.

On August 5, 2008, Healey signed with Swedish team Mora IK of the HockeyAllsvenskan. After leading the team with 25 points in just 20 games, Healey was unexpectedly released from his contract on November 25, 2008. On November 28, 2008, Healey signed with Swiss team the SCL Tigers of the NLA, on 1 February 2009 joined to EHC Olten on loan from SCL Tigers.

On September 8, 2009, Healey signed a one-year contract with Austrian team, Graz 99ers of the EBEL for the 2009–10 season. Establishing himself as a top-line center with Graz, Healey led the team and the League in scoring with 67 points while also recording a league best Plus/minus (+31). His standout performance helped the 99ers to a first-place finish in the regular season before suffering a shock first round defeat.

On April 28, 2010, Healey agreed to join rival, EHC Black Wings Linz, as a free agent on a one-year contract to remain in Austria for the 2010–11 season. Despite scoring 13 points in 19 games for the Black Wings, Healey was released from the team to make room in the foreign quota for Jason Ward on November 15, 2010.

== Career statistics ==
			Regular season					Playoffs
Season	Team	League	GP	G	A	Pts	PIM	GP	G	A	Pts	PIM
1993–94	New England Selects	NEJHL	37	61	76	137	—	—	—	—	—	—
1994–95	Rensselaer Polytechnic Institute	ECAC	37	13	11	24	35	—	—	—	—	—
1995–96	Rensselaer Polytechnic Institute	ECAC	35	18	22	40	57	—	—	—	—	—
1996–97	Rensselaer Polytechnic Institute	ECAC	36	30	26	56	63	—	—	—	—	—
1997–98	Rensselaer Polytechnic Institute	ECAC	35	21	27	48	42	—	—	—	—	—
1998–99	Saint John Flames	AHL	64	14	24	38	77	—	—	—	—	—
1998–99	Orlando Solar Bears	IHL	13	5	4	9	13	8	1	0	1	12
1999–00	Springfield Falcons	AHL	32	14	15	29	51	1	0	0	0	2
2000–01	Springfield Falcons	AHL	66	16	17	33	53	—	—	—	—	—
2001–02	Jackson Bandits	ECHL	2	1	1	2	0	—	—	—	—	—
2001–02	Manchester Monarchs	AHL	65	24	34	58	45	5	2	2	4	8
2002–03	Manchester Monarchs	AHL	75	42	31	73	47	3	1	0	1	2
2003–04	Chicago Wolves	AHL	71	31	20	51	52	10	3	6	9	10
2004–05	Adler Mannheim	DEL	50	16	13	29	54	13	2	4	6	12
2005–06	Providence Bruins	AHL	66	29	42	71	49	5	2	3	5	0
2005–06	Boston Bruins	NHL	2	0	0	0	2	—	—	—	—	—
2006–07	Springfield Falcons	AHL	80	27	48	75	51	—	—	—	—	—
2007–08	Lake Erie Monsters	AHL	74	22	36	58	48	—	—	—	—	—
2008–09	Mora IK	Allsv	20	10	15	25	36	—	—	—	—	—
2008–09	SCL Tigers	NLA	13	5	7	12	6	—	—	—	—	—
2009–10	Graz 99ers	EBEL	53	27	40	67	18	6	1	4	5	2
2010–11	EHC Black Wings Linz	EBEL	19	4	9	13	18	—	—	—	—	—
AHL totals			593	219	267	486	473	24	8	11	19	22
NHL totals			2	0	0	0	2	—	—	—	—	—

== Awards and honours ==
Award	Year
College
All-ECAC Hockey Rookie Team	1994–95
All-ECAC Hockey Second team	1996–97
AHCA East Second-Team All-American	1996–97, 1997–98
All-ECAC Hockey First Team	1997–98
AHL
Fred T. Hunt Memorial Award	2002–03
