= 1996–97 NCAA Division I men's ice hockey season =

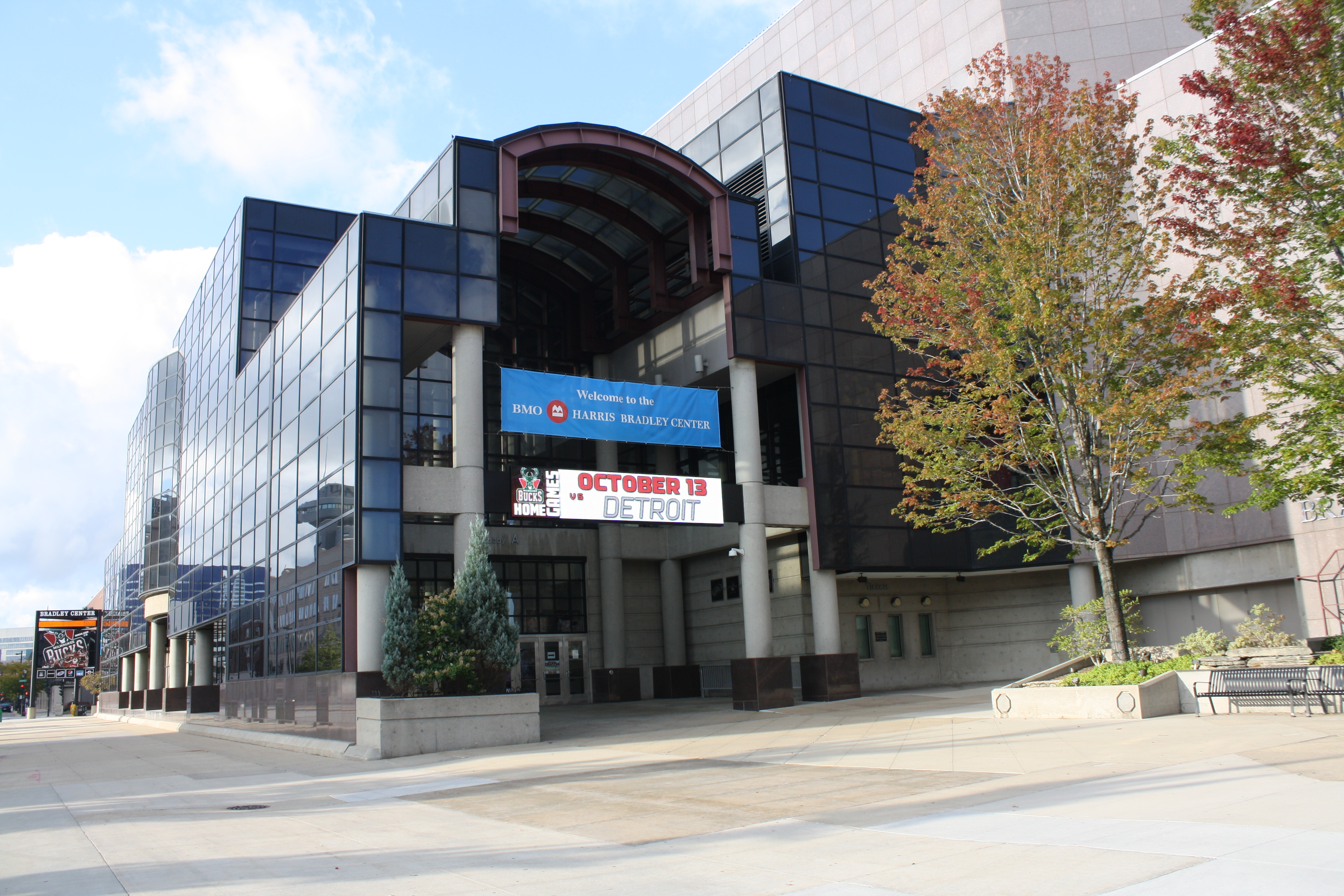
- The Bradley Center served as the host for the 1997 Frozen Four
- Duration: October 1996– March 29, 1997
- NCAA tournament: 1997
- National championship: Bradley Center; Milwaukee, Wisconsin
- NCAA champion: North Dakota
- Hobey Baker Award: Brendan Morrison (Michigan)

The 1996–97 NCAA Division I men's ice hockey season began in October 1996 and concluded with the 1997 NCAA Division I men's ice hockey tournament's championship game on March 29, 1997, at the Bradley Center in Milwaukee, Wisconsin. This was the 50th season in which an NCAA ice hockey championship was held and is the 103rd year overall where an NCAA school fielded a team.

== Season Outlook ==
=== Pre-season polls ===
The top teams in the nation as ranked before the start of the season.

The WMPL Baker's Dozen poll was voted on by coaches. The WMEB was voted on by media. The USA Today/American Hockey Magazine poll was voted on by coaches and media.

Adam Wodon, host of national college hockey talk show Around The Rinks, took over The Record poll. The poll was voted on by coaches, media, and NHL scouts. It was published by U.S. College Hockey Online.

WMPL Poll
Rank	Team
1	Michigan (8)
2	Boston University
3	Vermont
4	Minnesota
5	Colorado College
6	Bowling Green
7	Michigan State
8	North Dakota
9	Clarkson
10	Lake Superior State
11	Maine
12	New Hampshire
13 (tie)	Wisconsin
13 (tie)	Denver

WMEB Poll
Rank	Team
1	Michigan (8)
2	Vermont
3	Boston University
4	Colorado College
5	Minnesota
6	Bowling Green
7	Michigan State
8	Clarkson
9	New Hampshire
10	North Dakota

USCHO Poll
Rank	Team
1	Michigan (29)
2	Vermont (1)
3	Boston University
4	Minnesota
5	Colorado College
6	Bowling Green
7	Michigan State
8	Clarkson
9	North Dakota
10	New Hampshire

USA Today Poll
Rank	Team
1	Michigan (9)
2	Vermont
3	Boston University
4	Michigan State (1)
5	Minnesota
6	Colorado College
7	Denver
8	Bowling Green
9	Clarkson
10	New Hampshire

== Regular season ==
=== Season tournaments ===
Tournament	Dates	Teams	Champion
College Hockey Showcase	November 29–30	4	Michigan
Governor's Cup	November 29–30	4	New Hampshire
Williams Tournament	November 30–December 1	4	Army
J. C. Penney Classic	December 20–21	4	Maine
Badger Showdown	December 27–28	4	New Hampshire
Denver Cup	December 27–28	4	Denver
Great Lakes Invitational	December 27–28	4	Michigan
Mariucci Classic	December 27–28	4	Minnesota
Pepsi Cola Tournament	December 27–28	4	St. Lawrence
Rensselaer Holiday Tournament	December 27–28	4	Rensselaer
Syracuse Invitational	December 27–28	4	Cornell
Auld Lang Syne Classic	December 30–31	4	St. Lawrence
Beanpot	February 3, 10	4	Boston University

=== Standings ===
1996–97 Central Collegiate Hockey Association standings
	Conference							Overall					
	GP	W	L	T	PTS	GF	GA	GP	W	L	T	GF	GA
Michigan†*	27	21	3	3	46	151	64	43	35	4	4	242	98
Miami	27	19	7	1	39	112	79	40	27	12	1	174	119
Michigan State	27	16	7	4	36	99	76	40	23	13	4	145	118
Lake Superior State	27	15	8	4	34	106	98	38	19	14	5	154	142
Bowling Green	27	10	12	5	25	100	104	38	17	16	5	158	142
Western Michigan	27	10	12	5	25	94	99	37	14	18	5	125	134
Ohio State	27	9	16	2	20	95	132	39	12	25	2	135	190
Alaska-Fairbanks	27	8	18	1	17	92	126	37	14	22	1	135	169
Ferris State	27	7	18	2	16	83	121	37	11	23	3	125	166
Notre Dame	27	6	20	1	13	73	106	35	9	25	1	92	131
Championship: Michigan † indicates conference regular season champion * indicates conference tournament champion Final rankings: USA Today/American Hockey Magazine Coaches Poll Top 10 Poll

1996–97 ECAC Hockey standings
	Conference							Overall					
	GP	W	L	T	PTS	GF	GA	GP	W	L	T	GF	GA
Clarkson†	22	17	5	0	34	94	54	37	27	10	0	154	91
Cornell*	22	14	6	2	30	80	63	35	21	9	5	123	100
Vermont	22	13	6	3	29	67	60	36	22	11	3	125	105
Rensselaer	22	12	7	3	27	83	71	36	20	12	4	137	112
Union	22	11	8	3	25	63	54	34	18	13	3	106	79
Princeton	22	11	8	3	25	70	59	34	18	12	4	111	103
Colgate	22	10	9	3	23	79	79	33	16	14	3	126	124
Harvard	22	9	11	2	20	64	67	32	11	18	3	85	106
St. Lawrence	22	5	12	5	15	78	92	35	10	20	5	121	148
Yale	22	6	14	2	14	61	82	32	10	19	3	90	114
Dartmouth	22	5	15	2	12	75	100	29	10	17	2	105	121
Brown	22	4	16	2	10	81	114	29	7	19	3	108	148
Championship: Cornell † indicates conference regular season champion * indicates conference tournament champion (Whitelaw Cup); Final rankings: USA Today/American Hockey Magazine Coaches Poll Top 10 Poll

1996–97 Hockey East standings
	Conference							Overall					
	GP	W	L	T	PTS	GF	GA	GP	W	L	T	GF	GA
Boston University†*	24	16	4	4	36	116	71	41	26	9	6	178	115
New Hampshire†	24	18	6	0	36	130	76	39	28	11	0	204	129
Maine^	24	16	7	1	33	120	76	35	24	10	1	162	109
Providence	24	12	11	1	25	101	88	36	15	20	1	141	137
Merrimack	24	11	11	2	24	88	98	36	15	19	2	127	146
Boston College	24	9	12	3	21	96	112	38	15	19	4	145	170
Massachusetts–Lowell	24	9	14	1	19	83	113	38	15	21	2	126	163
Massachusetts	24	7	17	0	14	69	117	35	12	23	0	119	167
Northeastern	24	3	19	2	8	66	118	36	8	25	3	103	160
Championship: Boston University † indicates conference regular season champion * indicates conference tournament champion^ Maine was ineligible for the post season due to NCAA investigations Final rankings: USA Today/American Hockey Magazine Coaches Poll Top 10 Poll

1996–97 NCAA Division I Independent ice hockey standings
	Conference							Overall					
	GP	W	L	T	PTS	GF	GA	GP	W	L	T	GF	GA
Air Force	0	0	0	0	-	-	-	31	8	21	2	109	140
Army	0	0	0	0	-	-	-	34	19	13	2	158	119
Mankato State	0	0	0	0	-	-	-	34	17	14	3	141	123
Final rankings: USA Today/American Hockey Magazine Coaches Poll Top 10 Poll

1996–97 Western Collegiate Hockey Association standings
	Conference							Overall					
	GP	W	L	T	PTS	GF	GA	GP	W	L	T	GF	GA
North Dakota†*	32	21	10	1	43	137	105	43	31	10	2	190	130
Minnesota†	32	21	10	1	43	129	94	42	28	13	1	179	128
St. Cloud State	32	18	10	4	40	127	105	40	23	13	4	152	130
Colorado College	32	17	11	4	38	121	107	44	25	15	4	169	141
Denver	32	17	11	4	38	127	99	41	24	13	4	163	122
Minnesota-Duluth	32	15	13	4	34	115	111	38	18	16	4	133	131
Wisconsin	32	15	15	2	32	115	115	38	15	21	2	132	151
Northern Michigan	32	9	21	2	20	78	127	40	13	24	3	108	152
Alaska-Anchorage	32	7	21	4	18	75	109	36	9	23	4	86	126
Michigan Tech	32	5	23	4	14	81	133	39	8	27	4	98	155
Championship: North Dakota † indicates conference regular season champion * indicates conference tournament champion Final rankings: USA Today/American Hockey Magazine Coaches Poll Top 10 Poll

=== Final regular season polls ===
The WMPL, WMEB, and Around The Rinks/USCHO polls were released before the conference tournaments. The USA Today poll was released before the conference tournament finals.

WMPL Coaches Poll
Ranking	Team
1	Michigan (9)
2	Clarkson
3	Minnesota
4	New Hampshire
5	Boston University
(tie)	North Dakota
7	Miami
8	Vermont
9	Cornell
10	Michigan State
11	Denver
12	St. Cloud State
13	Lake Superior State

WMEB Media Poll
Ranking	Team
1	Michigan (6)
2	North Dakota
3	Clarkson
4	New Hampshire
5	Minnesota
6	Miami
7	Boston University
8	Maine
9	Michigan State
10	Vermont

USA Today / American Hockey Magazine Poll
Ranking	Team
1	Michigan (10)
2	Clarkson
3	Minnesota
4	Boston University
5	North Dakota
6	New Hampshire
7	Miami
8	Michigan State
9	Cornell
10	Denver

Around The Rinks / USCHO Poll
Ranking	Team
1	Michigan (30)
2	Clarkson
3	Minnesota
4	North Dakota
5	Miami
6	New Hampshire
7	Boston University
8	Vermont
9	Maine
10	Denver

== 1997 NCAA tournament ==
Regional Quarterfinals; March 21–22
E1	Clarkson	–
–	bye	–
East Regional
E4	New Hampshire	2
E5	Colorado College	3
W2	North Dakota	–
–	bye	–
West Regional
W3	Miami	2
W6	Cornell	4
W1	Michigan	–
–	bye	–
West Regional
W4	Minnesota	6
W5	Michigan State	3
E2	Boston University	–
–	bye	–
East Regional
E3	Vermont	3
E6	Denver	6

Regional semifinals March 22–23
E1	Clarkson	4
E5	Colorado College	5
W2	North Dakota	6
W6	Cornell	2
W1	Michigan	7
W4	Minnesota	4
E2	Boston University	4*
E6	Denver	3

Frozen Four; March 27
E5	Colorado College	2
W2	North Dakota	6
W1	Michigan	2
E2	Boston University	3

National championship March 29
W2	North Dakota	6
E2	Boston University	4

Note: * denotes overtime period(s)

== Player stats ==
=== Scoring leaders ===
The following players led the league in points at the conclusion of the season.

GP = Games played; G = Goals; A = Assists; Pts = Points; PIM = Penalty minutes

Player	Class	Team	GP	G	A	Pts	PIM
Brendan Morrison	Senior	Michigan	43	31	57	88	52
Todd White	Senior	Clarkson	37	38	36	74	22
Jason Krog	Sophomore	New Hampshire	39	23	44	67	28
Bill Muckalt	Junior	Michigan	36	26	38	64	69
John Madden	Senior	Michigan	42	26	37	63	56
Chris Drury	Junior	Boston University	41	38	24	62	64
Mike Johnson	Senior	Bowling Green	38	30	32	62	46
Jason Botterill	Senior	Michigan	42	37	24	61	129
Randy Robitaille	Sophomore	Miami	39	27	34	61	44
Curtis Fry	Senior	Bowling Green	37	21	40	61	50

=== Leading goaltenders ===
The following goaltenders led the league in goals against average at the end of the regular season while playing at least 33% of their team's total minutes.

GP = Games played; Min = Minutes played; W = Wins; L = Losses; T = Ties; GA = Goals against; SO = Shutouts; SV% = Save percentage; GAA = Goals against average

Player	Class	Team	GP	Min	W	L	T	GA	SO	SV%	GAA
Trevor Koenig	Junior	Union	28	1681	15	11	2	57	4	.931	2.03
Marty Turco	Junior	Michigan	41	2296	33	4	4	87	4	.894	2.27
Aaron Schweitzer	Freshman	North Dakota	23	1170	17	3	0	45	4	.908	2.31
Dan Murphy	Junior	Clarkson	37	2162	27	9	0	84	3	.917	2.33
Michel Larocque	Sophomore	Boston University	24	1466	16	4	4	58	0	.911	2.37
Chad Alban	Junior	Michigan State	39	2272	23	11	4	103	3	.894	2.72
Jason Elliott	Junior	Cornell	27	1475	16	7	2	67	0	.909	2.73
Trevor Prior	Sophomore	Miami	28	1645	17	10	1	75	1	.895	2.74
Jim Mullin	Senior	Denver	22						2	.900	2.75
Tim Thomas	Senior	Vermont	36	2158	22	11	3	101	2	.914	2.81

== Awards ==
=== NCAA ===
Award		Recipient
Hobey Baker Memorial Award		Brendan Morrison, Michigan
Spencer T. Penrose Award		Dean Blais, North Dakota
Most Outstanding Player in NCAA Tournament		Matt Henderson, North Dakota
AHCA All-American Teams
East First Team	Position	West First Team
Trevor Koenig, Union	G	Marty Turco, Michigan
Jon Coleman, Boston University	D	Dan Boyle, Miami
Matt Pagnutti, Clarkson	D	Mike Crowley, Minnesota
Chris Drury, Boston University	F	Randy Robitaille, Miami
Todd White, Clarkson	F	Brendan Morrison, Michigan
Martin St. Louis, Vermont	F	John Madden, Michigan
East Second Team	Position	West Second Team
Dan Murphy, Clarkson	G	Kirk Daubenspeck, Wisconsin
Chris Kelleher, Boston University	D	Andy Roach, Ferris State
Tim Murray, New Hampshire	D	Curtis Murphy, North Dakota
Mike Harder, Colgate	F	Jason Botterill, Michigan
Eric Healey, Rensselaer	F	David Hoogsteen, North Dakota
Jason Krog, New Hampshire	F	Mark Parrish, St. Cloud State

=== CCHA ===
Awards		Recipient
Player of the Year		Brendan Morrison, Michigan
Best Defensive Forward		John Madden, Michigan
Best Defensive Defenseman		Tyler Harlton, Michigan State
Best Offensive Defenseman		Andy Roach, Ferris State
Rookie of the Year		Daryl Andrews, Western Michigan
Coach of the Year		Mark Mazzoleni, Miami
Terry Flanagan Memorial Award		Steve Noble, Notre Dame
Most Valuable Player in Tournament		Brendan Morrison, Michigan
All-CCHA Teams
First Team	Position	Second Team
Marty Turco, Michigan	G	Trevor Prior, Miami
Dan Boyle, Miami	D	Joe Corvo, Western Michigan
Andy Roach, Ferris State	D	Harold Schock, Michigan
Brendan Morrison, Michigan	F	Sean Berens, Michigan State
Randy Robitaille, Miami	F	Joe Blaznek, Lake Superior State
John Madden, Michigan	F	Jason Sessa, Lake Superior State
Rookie Team	Position	
Chris Marvel, Alaska-Fairbanks	G	
Daryl Andrews, Western Michigan	D	
Josh Mizerek, Miami	D	
Hugo Boisvert, Ohio State	F	
Joe Dusbabek, Notre Dame	F	
Adam Edinger, Bowling Green	F	

=== ECAC ===
Award		Recipient
Player of the Year		Todd White, Clarkson
Rookie of the Year		J. R. Prestifilippo, Harvard
Coach of the Year		Stan Moore, Union
Best Defensive Defenseman		Matt Pagnutti, Clarkson
		Andrew Will, Union
Best Defensive Forward		Joel Prpic, St. Lawrence
Ken Dryden Award		Trevor Koenig, Union
Most Outstanding Player in Tournament		Jason Elliott, Cornell
All-ECAC Hockey Teams
First Team	Position	Second Team
Trevor Koenig, Union	G	Dan Murphy, Clarkson
Matt Pagnutti, Clarkson	D	Ray Giroux, Yale
Steve Wilson, Cornell	D	Andrew Will, Union
Mike Harder, Colgate	F	Paul DiFrancesco, St. Lawrence
Martin St. Louis, Vermont	F	Eric Healey, Rensselaer
Todd White, Clarkson	F	Éric Perrin, Vermont
Rookie Team	Position	
J. R. Prestifilippo, Harvard	G	
Cory Murphy, Colgate	D	
Dominique Auger, Princeton	D	
Ryan Campbell, Union	F	
Pete Gardiner, Rensselaer	F	
Jeff Hamilton, Yale	F	
Ryan Moynihan, Cornell	F	

=== Hockey East ===
Award		Recipient
Player of the Year		Chris Drury, Boston University
Rookie of the Year		Greg Koehler, Massachusetts-Lowell
Bob Kullen Coach of the Year Award		Dick Umile, New Hampshire
Len Ceglarski Sportsmanship Award		Steve Kariya, Maine
Best Defensive Forward		Travis Dillabough, Providence
William Flynn Tournament Most Valuable Player		Michel Larocque, Boston University
All-Hockey East Teams
All Stars*	Position	All Stars*
Martin Legault, Merrimack	G	Tom Noble, Boston University
Jason Mansoff, Maine	D	Jon Coleman, Boston University
Mike Nicholishen, Massachusetts-Lowell	D	Tim Murray, New Hampshire
Chris Drury, Boston University	F	Neil Donovan, Massachusetts-Lowell
Eric Boguniecki, New Hampshire	F	Marty Reasoner, Boston College
Jason Krog, New Hampshire	F	Mark Mowers, New Hampshire
Rookie Team	Position	
Sean Matile, New Hampshire	G	
Tom Poti, Boston University	D	
Mike Mottau, Boston College	D	
Greg Koehler, Massachusetts-Lowell	F	
Michael Souza, New Hampshire	F	
Cory Larose, Maine	F	

* No Distinction was made between First- and Second-Team All-Stars

=== WCHA ===
Award		Recipient
Player of the Year		Mike Crowley, Minnesota
Defensive Player of the Year		Eric Rud, Colorado College
Rookie of the Year		Brant Nicklin, Minnesota-Duluth
Student-Athlete of the Year		Petri Gunther, Denver
Coach of the Year		Dean Blais, North Dakota
Most Valuable Player in Tournament		David Hoogsteen, North Dakota
All-WCHA Teams
First Team	Position	Second Team
Steve DeBus, Minnesota	G	Kirk Daubenspeck, Wisconsin
Mike Crowley, Minnesota	D	Eric Rud, Colorado College
Curtis Murphy, North Dakota	D	Rick Mrozik, Minnesota-Duluth
Brian Swanson, Colorado College	F	Dave Paradise, St. Cloud State
Jason Blake, North Dakota	F	Matt Cullen, St. Cloud State
David Hoogsteen, North Dakota	F	Mike Peluso, Minnesota-Duluth
Third Team	Position	Rookie Team
Jim Mullin Denver	G	Brant Nicklin, Minnesota-Duluth
Dane Litke, North Dakota	D	Ben Clymer, Minnesota
Calvin Elfring, Colorado College	D	Curtis Doell, Minnesota-Duluth
Sacha Molin, St. Cloud State	F	Buddy Smith, Northern Michigan
Ryan Kraft, Minnesota	F	Dave Spehar, Minnesota
Andre Savage, Michigan Tech	F	Toby Petersen, Colorado College

== 1997 NHL entry draft ==
Round	Pick	Player	College	Conference	NHL team
2	27	Ben Clymer	Minnesota	WCHA	Boston Bruins
2	28	Brad DeFauw	North Dakota	WCHA	Carolina Hurricanes
2	30	Jean-Marc Pelletier	Cornell	ECAC Hockey	Philadelphia Flyers
2	44	Brian Gaffaney ^{†}	St. Cloud State	WCHA	Pittsburgh Penguins
3	57	Jeff Farkas	Boston College	Hockey East	Toronto Maple Leafs
3	63	Lee Goren ^{†}	North Dakota	WCHA	Boston Bruins
3	66	Josh Langfeld ^{†}	Michigan	CCHA	Ottawa Senators
3	67	Michael Souza	New Hampshire	Hockey East	Chicago Blackhawks
3	70	Erik Andersson ^{‡}	Denver	WCHA	Calgary Flames
4	83	Joe Corvo	Western Michigan	CCHA	Los Angeles Kings
5	110	Ben Simon	Notre Dame	CCHA	Chicago Blackhawks
5	115	Adam Edinger	Bowling Green	CCHA	New York Islanders
5	116	Kevin Caulfield	Boston College	Hockey East	Washington Capitals
5	120	Pete Gardiner	Rensselaer	ECAC Hockey	Chicago Blackhawks
5	133	Aaron Miskovich ^{†}	Minnesota	WCHA	Colorado Avalanche
6	136	Mike York	Michigan State	CCHA	New York Rangers
6	147	Heath Gordon ^{†}	Providence	Hockey East	Chicago Blackhawks
7	163	Joe Dusbabek	Notre Dame	CCHA	San Jose Sharks
7	169	Andrew Merrick	Michigan	CCHA	Carolina Hurricanes
7	172	Ben Guité	Maine	Hockey East	Montreal Canadiens
7	179	Mark Moore	Harvard	ECAC Hockey	Pittsburgh Penguins
7	181	Mat Snesrud ^{†}	Michigan Tech	WCHA	Mighty Ducks of Anaheim
7	182	Mike Mottau	Boston College	Hockey East	New York Rangers
7	183	Tyler Palmer	Lake Superior State	CCHA	Florida Panthers
8	191	Antti Laaksonen	Denver	WCHA	Boston Bruins
8	193	Jay Kopischke ^{†}	Notre Dame	CCHA	Los Angeles Kings
8	194	Russ Bartlett ^{†}	Boston University	Hockey East	Toronto Maple Leafs
8	196	Jeremy Symington ^{†}	St. Lawrence	ECAC Hockey	New York Islanders
8	203	Nick Gillis ^{†}	Boston University	Hockey East	Ottawa Senators
8	206	Bob Haglund ^{†}	Northeastern	Hockey East	St. Louis Blues
8	211	Doug Schueller ^{†}	Bowling Green	CCHA	Florida Panthers
8	215	Scott Clemmensen ^{†}	Boston College	Hockey East	New Jersey Devils
8	217	Doug Schmidt ^{†}	Northern Michigan	WCHA	Colorado Avalanche
9	222	Ryan Clark ^{†}	Notre Dame	CCHA	New York Islanders
9	224	Paul Comrie	Denver	WCHA	Tampa Bay Lightning
9	226	Matt Oikawa	St. Lawrence	ECAC Hockey	Washington Capitals
9	227	Peter Brady ^{†}	Alaska–Anchorage	WCHA	Vancouver Canucks
9	230	Chris Feil	Ohio State	CCHA	Chicago Blackhawks
9	233	Wyatt Smith	Minnesota	WCHA	Phoenix Coyotes
9	234	Eric Lind ^{†}	New Hampshire	Hockey East	Pittsburgh Penguins
9	235	Tommi Degerman	Boston University	Hockey East	New York Islanders
9	236	Richard Miller	Providence	Hockey East	New York Rangers
9	243	Kyle Kidney ^{†}	Massachusetts–Lowell	Hockey East	Colorado Avalanche

† incoming freshman
‡ Andersson had previous been selected by the Los Angeles Kings in 1990.

== See also ==
- 1996–97 NCAA Division II men's ice hockey season
- 1996–97 NCAA Division III men's ice hockey season
