= 1997 Hockey East men's ice hockey tournament =

1997 Hockey East Men's ice hockey tournament
- Dates: March 6–15, 1997
- Teams: 8
- Finals site: Fleet Center; Boston, Massachusetts
- Champions: Boston University (5th title)
- Winning coach: Jack Parker (5th title)
- MVP: Michel Larocque (Boston University)
- Hockey East Men's Ice Hockey Tournaments

The 1997 Hockey East Men's Ice Hockey Tournament was the 13th tournament in the history of the conference. It was played between March 6 and March 15, 1997. Quarterfinal games were played at home team campus sites, while the final four games were played at the Fleet Center in Boston, Massachusetts, the home venue of the NHL's Boston Bruins. By winning the tournament, Boston University received the Hockey East's automatic bid to the 1997 NCAA Division I Men's Ice Hockey Tournament.

== Format ==
The tournament featured three rounds of play. The team that finishes ninth in the conference is not eligible for tournament play. In the first round, the first and eighth seeds, the second and seventh seeds, the third seed and sixth seeds, and the fourth seed and fifth seeds played a best-of-three with the winner advancing to the semifinals. In the semifinals, the highest and lowest seeds and second-highest and second-lowest seeds play a single elimination game, with the winners advancing to the championship game and the losers meeting in a third-place game. The tournament champion receives an automatic bid to the 1997 NCAA Division I Men's Ice Hockey Tournament.

== Conference standings ==
Note: GP = Games played; W = Wins; L = Losses; T = Ties; PTS = Points; GF = Goals For; GA = Goals Against

1996–97 Hockey East standings
	Conference							Overall					
	GP	W	L	T	PTS	GF	GA	GP	W	L	T	GF	GA
Boston University†*	24	16	4	4	36	116	71	41	26	9	6	178	115
New Hampshire†	24	18	6	0	36	130	76	39	28	11	0	204	129
Maine^	24	16	7	1	33	120	76	35	24	10	1	162	109
Providence	24	12	11	1	25	101	88	36	15	20	1	141	137
Merrimack	24	11	11	2	24	88	98	36	15	19	2	127	146
Boston College	24	9	12	3	21	96	112	38	15	19	4	145	170
Massachusetts–Lowell	24	9	14	1	19	83	113	38	15	21	2	126	163
Massachusetts	24	7	17	0	14	69	117	35	12	23	0	119	167
Northeastern	24	3	19	2	8	66	118	36	8	25	3	103	160
Championship: Boston University † indicates conference regular season champion * indicates conference tournament champion^ Maine was ineligible for the post season due to NCAA investigations Final rankings: USA Today/American Hockey Magazine Coaches Poll Top 10 Poll

== Bracket ==
Teams are reseeded after the quarterfinals

Quarterfinals; March 6–8
1	Boston University	6	7	—
8	Northeastern	2	1	—
2	New Hampshire	5	8	—
7	Massachusetts	1	2	—
(Pairings are reseeded after the first round)
3	Providence	2	5	—
6	Massachusetts-Lowell	6	6	—
4	Merrimack	6	3	—
5	Boston College	7	5	—

Semifinals; March 14
1	Boston University	3
6	Massachusetts-Lowell	2
2	New Hampshire	4
5	Boston College	0

Championship; March 15
1	Boston University	4
2	New Hampshire	2
Third Place
5	Boston College	2*
6	Massachusetts-Lowell	2

Note: * denotes overtime period(s)

=== Quarterfinals ===
==== (1) Boston University vs. (8) Northeastern ====
March 7	Boston University	6 – 2	Northeastern	Walter Brown Arena

March 8	Boston University	7 – 1	Northeastern	Walter Brown Arena

Boston University won series 2–0

==== (2) New Hampshire vs. (7) Massachusetts ====
March 7	New Hampshire	5 – 1	Massachusetts	Whittemore Center

March 8	New Hampshire	8 – 2	Massachusetts	Whittemore Center

New Hampshire won series 2–0

==== (3) Providence vs. (6) Massachusetts-Lowell ====
March 7	Providence	2 – 6	Massachusetts-Lowell	Schneider Arena

March 8	Providence	5 – 6	Massachusetts-Lowell	Schneider Arena

Massachusetts-Lowell won series 2–0

==== (4) Merrimack vs. (5) Boston College ====
March 6	Merrimack	6 – 7	Boston College	Lawler Arena

March 7	Merrimack	3 – 5	Boston College	Lawler Arena

Boston College won series 2–0

=== Semifinals ===
==== (1) Boston University vs. (6) Massachusetts-Lowell ====
March 14	Boston University	3 – 2	Massachusetts-Lowell	Fleet Center

==== (2) New Hampshire vs. (5) Boston College ====
March 14	New Hampshire	4 – 0	Boston College	Fleet Center

=== Third Place ===
==== (5) Boston College vs. (6) Massachusetts-Lowell ====
March 15	Boston College	2 – 2	OT	Massachusetts-Lowell	Fleet Center

=== Championship ===
==== (1) Boston University vs. (2) New Hampshire ====
March 15	Boston University	4 – 2	New Hampshire	Fleet Center

== Tournament awards ==
=== All-Tournament Team ===
- F Shawn Bates (Boston University)
- F Chris Bell (Massachusetts-Lowell)
- F Mark Mowers (New Hampshire)
- D Shane Johnson (Boston University)
- D Chris Kelleher (Boston University)
- G Michel Larocque* (Boston University)

* Tournament MVP(s)
