= 1996 ECAC Hockey men's ice hockey tournament =

1996 ECAC Men's ice hockey tournament
- Dates: March 5–16, 1996
- Teams: 10
- Finals site: Olympic Arena; Lake Placid, New York
- Champions: Cornell (8th title)
- Winning coach: Mike Schafer (1st title)
- MVP: Jason Elliott (Cornell)
- ECAC Men's Ice Hockey Tournaments

The 1996 ECAC Hockey Men's Ice Hockey Tournament was the 35th tournament in league history. It was played between March 5 and March 16, 1996. Preliminary and quarterfinal games were played at home team campus sites, while the 'final four' games were played at the Olympic Arena (subsequently renamed Herb Brooks Arena) in Lake Placid, New York. By winning the tournament, Cornell received the ECAC's automatic bid to the 1996 NCAA Division I Men's Ice Hockey Tournament.

== Format ==
The tournament featured four rounds of play. The two teams that finish below tenth place in the standings are not eligible for tournament play. In the preliminary round, the seventh and tenth seeds and the eighth and ninth seeds each play a single game to determine the final qualifying teams for the quarterfinals. In the quarterfinals the first seed and lower ranked qualifier, the second and higher ranked qualifier, the third seed and sixth seed and the fourth seed and fifth seed played a modified best-of-three series, where the first team to receive 3 points moves on. After the opening round every series becomes a single-elimination game. In the semifinals, the highest seed plays the lowest remaining seed while the two remaining teams play with the winners advancing to the championship game and the losers advancing to the third place game. The tournament champion receives an automatic bid to the 1996 NCAA Division I Men's Ice Hockey Tournament.

== Conference standings ==
Note: GP = Games played; W = Wins; L = Losses; T = Ties; PTS = Points; GF = Goals For; GA = Goals Against

1995–96 ECAC Hockey standings
	Conference							Overall					
	GP	W	L	T	PTS	GF	GA	GP	W	L	T	GF	GA
Vermont†	22	17	2	3	37	86	45	38	27	7	4	149	91
Clarkson	22	16	4	2	34	97	59	38	25	10	3	152	105
St. Lawrence	22	15	4	3	33	107	74	35	20	12	3	144	132
Cornell*	22	14	4	4	31	94	66	34	21	9	4	139	108
Colgate	22	13	5	4	30	95	60	34	17	13	4	136	117
Harvard	22	9	12	1	19	76	71	34	13	20	1	111	114
Brown	22	5	11	6	16	60	81	32	9	15	8	99	124
Rensselaer	22	7	13	2	16	63	77	35	10	22	3	116	131
Dartmouth	22	6	14	2	14	57	88	30	7	20	3	83	130
Princeton	22	5	14	2	13	59	81	30	7	19	4	78	117
Union	22	4	15	3	11	55	83	30	7	19	4	83	100
Yale	22	4	17	1	9	53	109	31	7	23	1	80	145
Championship: Cornell † indicates conference regular season champion * indicates conference tournament champion (Whitelaw Cup); Final rankings: USA Today/American Hockey Magazine Coaches Poll Top 10 Poll

== Bracket ==
Teams are reseeded after the first two rounds

Preliminary Round; March 5
7	Brown	4
10	Princeton	3
8	Rensselaer	5
9	Dartmouth	4

Quarterfinals; March 8–10
1	Vermont	5	6	—
8	Rensselaer	2	4	—
2	Clarkson	5	5	—
7	Brown	2	3	—
3	St. Lawrence	2	3	4
6	Harvard	5	2	8
4	Cornell	8	8	—
5	Colgate	3	1	—

Semifinals; March 15
1	Vermont	3
6	Harvard	4
2	Clarkson	0
4	Cornell	3

Championship; March 16
4	Cornell	2
6	Harvard	1
Third Place
1	Vermont	3
2	Clarkson	1

Note: * denotes overtime period(s)

=== Preliminary round ===
==== (7) Brown vs. (10) Princeton ====
March 5	Brown	4 – 3	Princeton	Meehan Auditorium

==== (8) Rensselaer vs. (9) Dartmouth ====
March 5	Rensselaer	5 – 4	OT	Dartmouth	Houston Field House

=== Quarterfinals ===
==== (1) Vermont vs. (8) Rensselaer ====
March 8	Vermont	5 – 2	Rensselaer	Gutterson Fieldhouse

March 9	Vermont	6 – 4	Rensselaer	Gutterson Fieldhouse

Vermont won series 2–0

==== (2) Clarkson vs. (7) Brown ====
March 8	Clarkson	5 – 2	Brown	Cheel Arena

March 9	Clarkson	5 – 3	Brown	Cheel Arena

Clarkson won series 2–0

==== (3) St. Lawrence vs. (6) Harvard ====
March 8	St. Lawrence	2 – 5	Harvard	Appleton Arena

March 9	St. Lawrence	3 – 2	Harvard	Appleton Arena

March 10	St. Lawrence	4 – 8	Harvard	Appleton Arena

Harvard won series 2–1

==== (4) Cornell vs. (5) Colgate ====
March 8	Cornell	8 – 3	Colgate	Lynah Rink

March 9	Cornell	8 – 1	Colgate	Lynah Rink

Cornell won series 2–0

=== Semifinals ===
==== (1) Vermont vs. (6) Harvard ====
March 15	Vermont	3 – 4	Harvard	Olympic Arena

==== (2) Clarkson vs. (4) Cornell ====
March 15	Clarkson	0 – 3	Cornell	Olympic Arena

=== Third place ===
==== (1) Vermont vs. (2) Clarkson ====
March 16	Vermont	3 – 1	Clarkson	Olympic Arena

=== Championship ===
==== (4) Cornell vs. (6) Harvard ====
March 16	Cornell	2 – 1	Harvard	Olympic Arena

== Tournament awards ==
=== All-Tournament Team ===
- F Mike Sancimino (Cornell)
- F Martin St. Louis (Vermont)
- F Tommy Holmes (Harvard)
- D Steve Wilson (Cornell)
- D Jeremiah McCarthy (Harvard)
- G Jason Elliott* (Cornell)

* Most Outstanding Player(s)
