= ECAC Hockey Most Outstanding Player in Tournament =

Ice hockey award

- Sport: Ice hockey
- Awarded for: The Most Outstanding Player in the ECAC Hockey Tournament

History
- First award: 1962
- Most recent: Emmett Croteau

The ECAC Hockey Most Outstanding Player in Tournament is an annual award given out at the conclusion of the ECAC Hockey conference tournament to the best player in the championship as voted by the coaches of each ECAC team.

The Most Outstanding Player in Tournament was first awarded in 1962 and every year thereafter.

Three players (Ken Dryden, Rick Meagher and Jason Elliott) have received the award two separate times with Meagher doing so in non-consecutive years. From 1975 through 1977 the award was received by brothers Rick and Terry Meagher.

== Award winners ==
Year	Winner	Position	School
1962	Arlie Parker	Defenceman	St. Lawrence
1963	Gene Kinasewich	Forward	Harvard
1964	Bob Perani*	Goaltender	St. Lawrence
1965	Pat Murphy	Goaltender	Boston College
1966	Terry Yurkiewicz	Goaltender	Clarkson
1967	Doug Ferguson	Center	Cornell
1968	Ken Dryden	Goaltender	Cornell
1969	Ken Dryden	Goaltender	Cornell
1970	Bruce Bullock*	Goaltender	Clarkson
1971	Dave Hynes	Left wing	Harvard
1972	John Danby	Forward	Boston University
1973	Carlo Ugolini	Left wing	Cornell
1974	Ed Walsh	Goaltender	Boston University
1975	Rick Meagher	Center	Boston University
1976	Terry Meagher	Forward	Boston University
1977	Rick Meagher	Center	Boston University
1978	Joe Mullen	Right wing	Boston College
1979	Greg Moffett	Goaltender	New Hampshire
1980	Darren Eliot	Goaltender	Cornell
1981	Kurt Kleinendorst	Forward	Providence
1982	Mark Davidner	Goaltender	Northeastern
1983	Mitch Olson	Defenceman	Harvard

Note: * recipient did not play for champion

Year	Winner	Position	School
1984	Adam Oates	Center	Rensselaer
1985	Daren Puppa	Goaltender	Rensselaer
1986	Doug Dadswell	Goaltender	Cornell
1987	Lane MacDonald	Left wing	Harvard
1988	Pete Lappin	Right wing	St. Lawrence
1989	Doug Murray	Forward	St. Lawrence
1990	Craig Woodcroft	Center	Colgate
1991	Hugo Belanger	Left wing	Clarkson
1992	Daniel Laperrière	Defenceman	St. Lawrence
1993	Chris Rogles	Goaltender	Clarkson
1994	Sean McCann	Defenceman	Harvard
1995	Mike Tamburro	Goaltender	Rensselaer
1996	Jason Elliott	Goaltender	Cornell
1997	Jason Elliott	Goaltender	Cornell
1998	Jeff Halpern	Center	Princeton
1999	Willie Mitchell	Defenceman	Clarkson
2000	Derek Gustafson	Goaltender	St. Lawrence
2001	Jeremy Symington	Goaltender	St. Lawrence
2002	Tyler Kolarik	Center	Harvard
2003	David LeNeveu	Goaltender	Cornell
2004	Brendan Bernakevitch	Center	Harvard
2005	Charlie Cook	Defenceman	Cornell

Year	Winner	Position	School
2006	John Dagineau	Goaltender	Harvard
2007	Chris D'Alvise	Center	Clarkson
2008	Zane Kalemba	Goaltender	Princeton
2009	Sean Backman	Right wing	Yale
2010	Ben Scrivens	Goaltender	Cornell
2011	Ryan Rondeau	Goaltender	Yale
2012	Jeremy Welsh	Center	Union
2013	Troy Grosenick	Goaltender	Union
2014	Daniel Carr	Left wing	Union
2015	Jimmy Vesey	Forward	Harvard
2016	Connor Clifton	Defenceman	Quinnipiac
2017	Merrick Madsen	Goaltender	Harvard
2018	Ryan Ferland	Goaltender	Princeton
2019	Devin Brosseau	Center	Clarkson
2020	Not awarded due to the coronavirus pandemic		
2021	David Jankowski	Center	St. Lawrence
2022	Matthew Coronato	Right wing	Harvard
2023	Carter Gylander	Goaltender	Colgate
2024	Jonathan Castagna	Center	Cornell
2025	Ian Shane	Goaltender	Cornell
2026	Emmett Croteau	Goaltender	Dartmouth

=== Winners by school ===
School	Winners
Cornell	13
Harvard	11
St. Lawrence	8
Clarkson	7
Boston University	5
Princeton	3
Rensselaer	3
Union	3
Boston College	2
Colgate	2
Yale	2
Dartmouth	1
New Hampshire	1
Northeastern	1
Providence	1
Quinnipiac	1

=== Winners by position ===
Position	Winners
Center	13
Right wing	4
Left wing	5
Forward	6
Defenceman	7
Goaltender	29

== See also ==
- ECAC Hockey Awards
- List of ECAC Hockey Men's Ice Hockey Tournament champions
