= Jason Elliott (ice hockey) =

Canadian ice hockey player (born 1975)

- Born: 11 October 1975 (age 50) Inuvik, Northwest Territories, Canada
- Height: 6 ft 2 in (188 cm)
- Weight: 183 lb (83 kg; 13 st 1 lb)
- Position: Goaltender
- Shot: Left
- Played for: Canberra Knights; Adirondack Red Wings; Manitoba Moose; Houston Aeros; Cincinnati Mighty Ducks; TPS; EC Bad Nauheim; SC Bietigheim-Bissingen
- National team: Australia
- NHL draft: 205th overall, 1994; Detroit Red Wings
- Playing career: 1998–2007

Jason Elliott (born 11 October 1975), is a Canadian former professional ice hockey player.

== Playing career ==
Born in Inuvik, Northwest Territories, Elliott was drafted 205th overall in the eighth round of 1994 NHL entry draft by the Detroit Red Wings, from Cornell University of the National Collegiate Athletic Association. Elliott also played junior ice hockey with the Kimberley Dynamiters of the Rocky Mountain Junior Hockey League and earlier with the Canberra Knights of the Australian Ice Hockey League/East Coast Super League. In the early 1990s he moved to Australia with his parents and played on the Australian national team. He played most of his professional career in the minors but did appear in preseason games in 2002 for Detroit in the National Hockey League, and appeared as third string goalie in the Red Wing's 2002 Stanley Cup victory. He is included in the team photograph and was awarded a Stanley Cup ring, but never played a game in the NHL. Elliott went on to a long minor league career in both the US and Europe before retiring following the 2006–2007 season.

== Awards and honours ==
Award	Year
ECAC Hockey All-Tournament Team	1996
ECAC Hockey All-Tournament Team	1997
All-ECAC Hockey Second Team	1997–98

== Notes ==
Awards and achievements
Preceded by Mike Tamburro	ECAC Hockey Most Outstanding Player in Tournament; 1996, 1997	Succeeded by Jeff Halpern
