= 1999–2000 Atlanta Thrashers season =

National Hockey League team season

1999–2000 Atlanta Thrashers
- Division: 5th Southeast
- Conference: 15th Eastern
- 1999–2000 record: 14–57–7–4
- Home record: 9–26–3–3
- Road record: 5–31–4–1
- Goals for: 170
- Goals against: 313

Team information
- General manager: Don Waddell
- Coach: Curt Fraser
- Captain: Kelly Buchberger (Oct-Mar); Vacant (Mar-Apr)
- Arena: Philips Arena
- Average attendance: 17,206
- Minor league affiliate: Orlando Solar Bears

Team leaders
- Goals: Andrew Brunette (23)
- Assists: Andrew Brunette (27)
- Points: Andrew Brunette (50)
- Penalty minutes: Denny Lambert (219)
- Plus/minus: Donald Audette (-4)
- Wins: Damian Rhodes (5)
- Goals against average: Scott Fankhouser (3.20)

The 1999–2000 Atlanta Thrashers season was the 18th season of play for the National Hockey League franchise that was established on June 22, 1979, and 25th season for the organization overall. Following three years of inactivity, the franchise was reactivated and relocated to Atlanta.

The Thrashers finished the season with an NHL-worst record of 14–57–7–4 for 39 points. To date, it is the worst season in the history of the Atlanta Thrashers/Winnipeg Jets franchise. In addition, it represents the lowest full-season point total since the beginning of the NHL's "three-point" standings system in 1999–2000, as well as the lowest point total for any team playing an 82-game season. The rebuilding Detroit Red Wings tied the mark 19 seasons later. But, because of the COVID-19 pandemic, the Red Wings played 71 games, 11 less than the Thrashers. Their .238 points percentage was the lowest by an NHL team since the 1993–94 Ottawa Senators.

Initially treated as the expansion season of the Atlanta Thrashers, it is now considered the 25th season of the Thrashers/Jets franchise as of 2026, with the Jets reclaiming its pre-1996 history from the inactive Arizona Coyotes. As a result, the Jets were retconned as deactivated following their 1995–96 season and was reactivated as the Thrashers this season.

== Offseason ==
The newly formed Thrashers selected Patrik Stefan with the first overall selection in the 1999 NHL entry draft.

== Regular season ==
The players who were introduced to the NHL as members of the expansion Thrashers, along with Stefan were Bryan Adams, Scott Fankhouser, Andreas Karlsson, Geordie Kinnear, Per Svartvadet, and Sergei Vyshedkevich. Éric Bertrand and Frantisek Kaberle played their rookie campaigns as members of the Thrashers, too, but they weren't Thrashers to begin with, with Bertrand getting traded from the New Jersey Devils, the eventual Stanley Cup champions, and Kaberle getting traded from the Los Angeles Kings.

They played their first game on October 2, 1999, losing 4–1 to the eventual Stanley Cup Champions, the New Jersey Devils. Captain Kelly Buchberger scored the franchise's first goal in the loss. The Thrashers would not get their first win until two weeks later. Damian Rhodes blanked the New York Islanders 2–0 on the road. The Thrashers would not get their first victory in Atlanta until October 26 when they beat the Calgary Flames in their return to Atlanta 2–1. Andrew Brunette led the team in scoring with 50 points as the Thrashers finished last in the Southeast Division with an NHL worst record of 14–57–7–4.

In addition to being shut out a league-high 12 times, the Thrashers struggled offensively and defensively, scoring the fewest goals (170) and allowing the most goals (313) out of all 28 teams. They also tied the Chicago Blackhawks for most short-handed goals allowed, with 13.

=== Final standings ===
Southeast Division
No.	CR		GP	W	L	T	OTL	GF	GA	Pts
1	2	**Washington Capitals**	82	44	24	12	2	227	194	102
2	5	**Florida Panthers**	82	43	27	6	6	244	209	98
3	9	Carolina Hurricanes	82	37	35	10	0	217	216	84
4	14	Tampa Bay Lightning	82	19	47	9	7	204	310	54
5	15	Atlanta Thrashers	82	14	57	7	4	170	313	39

Note: CR = Conference rank; GP = Games played; W = Wins; L = Losses; T = Ties; OTL=Overtime loss; GF = Goals for; GA = Goals against; PIM=Penalties in Minutes; Pts = Points
Bolded teams qualified for the playoffs.

Eastern Conference
R		Div	GP	W	L	T	OTL	GF	GA	Pts
**1**	**z – Philadelphia Flyers**	**AT**	**82**	**45**	**22**	**12**	**3**	**237**	**179**	105
**2**	**y – Washington Capitals**	**SE**	**82**	**44**	**24**	**12**	**2**	**227**	**194**	102
**3**	**y – Toronto Maple Leafs**	**NE**	**82**	**45**	**27**	**7**	**3**	**246**	**222**	100
**4**	**New Jersey Devils**	**AT**	**82**	**45**	**24**	**8**	**5**	**251**	**203**	103
**5**	**Florida Panthers**	**SE**	**82**	**43**	**27**	**6**	**6**	**244**	**209**	98
**6**	**Ottawa Senators**	**NE**	**82**	**41**	**28**	**11**	**2**	**244**	**210**	95
**7**	**Pittsburgh Penguins**	**AT**	**82**	**37**	**31**	**8**	**6**	**241**	**236**	88
**8**	**Buffalo Sabres**	**NE**	**82**	**35**	**32**	**11**	**4**	**213**	**204**	85
8.5
9	Carolina Hurricanes	SE	82	37	35	10	0	217	216	84
10	Montreal Canadiens	NE	82	35	34	9	4	196	194	83
11	New York Rangers	AT	82	29	38	12	3	218	246	73
12	Boston Bruins	NE	82	24	33	19	6	210	248	73
13	New York Islanders	AT	82	24	48	9	1	194	275	58
14	Tampa Bay Lightning	SE	82	19	47	9	7	204	310	54
15	Atlanta Thrashers	SE	82	14	57	7	4	170	313	39

Divisions: AT – Atlantic, NE – Northeast, SE – Southeast

bold – Qualified for playoffs; z – Won conference; y – Won division

== Schedule and results ==
1999–2000 regular season
October: 2–5–2–1 (home: 1–3–1–1; road: 1–2–1–0)

Game	Date	Score	Opponent	Record	Recap
1	October 2, 1999	1–4	New Jersey Devils (1999–2000)	0–1–0–0	L
2	October 7, 1999	1–7	Detroit Red Wings (1999–2000)	0–2–0–0	L
3	October 9, 1999	5–5 OT	Buffalo Sabres (1999–2000)	0–2–1–0	T
4	October 14, 1999	2–0	@ New York Islanders (1999–2000)	1–2–1–0	W
5	October 16, 1999	4–4 OT	@ Tampa Bay Lightning (1999–2000)	1–2–2–0	T
6	October 17, 1999	1–4	@ New York Rangers (1999–2000)	1–3–2–0	L
7	October 23, 1999	2–3 OT	Colorado Avalanche (1999–2000)	1–3–2–1	OTL
8	October 26, 1999	2–1	Calgary Flames (1999–2000)	2–3–2–1	W
9	October 27, 1999	0–4	@ Toronto Maple Leafs (1999–2000)	2–4–2–1	L
10	October 31, 1999	4–6	Ottawa Senators (1999–2000)	2–5–2–1	L

November: 3–9–0–0 (home: 3–3–0–0; road: 0–6–0–0)

Game	Date	Score	Opponent	Record	Recap
11	November 3, 1999	4–1	Tampa Bay Lightning (1999–2000)	3–5–2–1	W
12	November 6, 1999	2–4	@ Boston Bruins (1999–2000)	3–6–2–1	L
13	November 10, 1999	1–4	@ Florida Panthers (1999–2000)	3–7–2–1	L
14	November 12, 1999	1–5	@ New Jersey Devils (1999–2000)	3–8–2–1	L
15	November 13, 1999	2–4	@ Montreal Canadiens (1999–2000)	3–9–2–1	L
16	November 17, 1999	5–4	Tampa Bay Lightning (1999–2000)	4–9–2–1	W
17	November 19, 1999	0–4	Buffalo Sabres (1999–2000)	4–10–2–1	L
18	November 20, 1999	3–4	@ Buffalo Sabres (1999–2000)	4–11–2–1	L
19	November 22, 1999	6–3	Vancouver Canucks (1999–2000)	5–11–2–1	W
20	November 25, 1999	3–6	Ottawa Senators (1999–2000)	5–12–2–1	L
21	November 27, 1999	0–3	@ Florida Panthers (1999–2000)	5–13–2–1	L
22	November 28, 1999	2–4	Dallas Stars (1999–2000)	5–14–2–1	L

December: 3–7–2–2 (home: 2–2–0–1; road: 1–5–2–1)

Game	Date	Score	Opponent	Record	Recap
23	December 3, 1999	2–1	Florida Panthers (1999–2000)	6–14–2–1	W
24	December 4, 1999	4–3	@ New York Islanders (1999–2000)	7–14–2–1	W
25	December 6, 1999	3–4 OT	Nashville Predators (1999–2000)	7–14–2–2	OTL
26	December 8, 1999	0–4	@ Los Angeles Kings (1999–2000)	7–15–2–2	L
27	December 10, 1999	1–4	@ San Jose Sharks (1999–2000)	7–16–2–2	L
28	December 12, 1999	1–4	@ Mighty Ducks of Anaheim (1999–2000)	7–17–2–2	L
29	December 15, 1999	0–4	Washington Capitals (1999–2000)	7–18–2–2	L
30	December 17, 1999	1–3	Boston Bruins (1999–2000)	7–19–2–2	L
31	December 18, 1999	2–4	@ Carolina Hurricanes (1999–2000)	7–20–2–2	L
32	December 22, 1999	3–3 OT	@ Florida Panthers (1999–2000)	7–20–3–2	T
33	December 23, 1999	4–4 OT	@ Philadelphia Flyers (1999–2000)	7–20–4–2	T
34	December 26, 1999	6–3	Tampa Bay Lightning (1999–2000)	8–20–4–2	W
35	December 27, 1999	2–3 OT	@ Detroit Red Wings (1999–2000)	8–20–4–3	OTL
36	December 30, 1999	0–6	@ Nashville Predators (1999–2000)	8–21–4–3	L

January: 3–8–2–1 (home: 2–4–1–1; road: 1–4–1–0)

Game	Date	Score	Opponent	Record	Recap
37	January 1, 2000	2–4	Carolina Hurricanes (1999–2000)	8–22–4–3	L
38	January 4, 2000	5–4	@ Buffalo Sabres (1999–2000)	9–22–4–3	W
39	January 6, 2000	3–1	Washington Capitals (1999–2000)	10–22–4–3	W
40	January 8, 2000	0–3	@ Washington Capitals (1999–2000)	10–23–4–3	L
41	January 12, 2000	2–5	Washington Capitals (1999–2000)	10–24–4–3	L
42	January 14, 2000	1–0	Philadelphia Flyers (1999–2000)	11–24–4–3	W
43	January 16, 2000	3–6	@ New York Rangers (1999–2000)	11–25–4–3	L
44	January 17, 2000	3–3 OT	@ Boston Bruins (1999–2000)	11–25–5–3	T
45	January 19, 2000	3–4	Boston Bruins (1999–2000)	11–26–5–3	L
46	January 21, 2000	3–3 OT	Florida Panthers (1999–2000)	11–26–6–3	T
47	January 24, 2000	3–6	New York Rangers (1999–2000)	11–27–6–3	L
48	January 27, 2000	1–4	@ Pittsburgh Penguins (1999–2000)	11–28–6–3	L
49	January 29, 2000	1–2	@ Tampa Bay Lightning (1999–2000)	11–29–6–3	L
50	January 31, 2000	1–2 OT	Pittsburgh Penguins (1999–2000)	11–29–6–4	OTL

February: 1–11–0–0 (home: 0–5–0–0; road: 1–6–0–0)

Game	Date	Score	Opponent	Record	Recap
51	February 2, 2000	1–2	@ Dallas Stars (1999–2000)	11–30–6–4	L
52	February 3, 2000	3–6	New York Rangers (1999–2000)	11–31–6–4	L
53	February 9, 2000	2–5	@ Pittsburgh Penguins (1999–2000)	11–32–6–4	L
54	February 11, 2000	0–3	San Jose Sharks (1999–2000)	11–33–6–4	L
55	February 12, 2000	3–4	Chicago Blackhawks (1999–2000)	11–34–6–4	L
56	February 15, 2000	1–4	@ St. Louis Blues (1999–2000)	11–35–6–4	L
57	February 16, 2000	1–5	Montreal Canadiens (1999–2000)	11–36–6–4	L
58	February 20, 2000	2–4	@ Phoenix Coyotes (1999–2000)	11–37–6–4	L
59	February 22, 2000	4–3	@ Colorado Avalanche (1999–2000)	12–37–6–4	W
60	February 25, 2000	4–5	@ Edmonton Oilers (1999–2000)	12–38–6–4	L
61	February 26, 2000	2–5	@ Calgary Flames (1999–2000)	12–39–6–4	L
62	February 29, 2000	0–4	Toronto Maple Leafs (1999–2000)	12–40–6–4	L

March: 1–13–1–0 (home: 0–7–1–0; road: 1–6–0–0)

Game	Date	Score	Opponent	Record	Recap
63	March 2, 2000	2–5	St. Louis Blues (1999–2000)	12–41–6–4	L
64	March 4, 2000	2–3	@ Ottawa Senators (1999–2000)	12–42–6–4	L
65	March 6, 2000	2–3	@ Montreal Canadiens (1999–2000)	12–43–6–4	L
66	March 10, 2000	0–9	New Jersey Devils (1999–2000)	12–44–6–4	L
67	March 12, 2000	1–5	@ Carolina Hurricanes (1999–2000)	12–45–6–4	L
68	March 13, 2000	0–3	Edmonton Oilers (1999–2000)	12–46–6–4	L
69	March 16, 2000	2–4	New York Islanders (1999–2000)	12–47–6–4	L
70	March 18, 2000	4–1	@ Toronto Maple Leafs (1999–2000)	13–47–6–4	W
71	March 21, 2000	1–7	@ Ottawa Senators (1999–2000)	13–48–6–4	L
72	March 22, 2000	1–1 OT	Montreal Canadiens (1999–2000)	13–48–7–4	T
73	March 24, 2000	3–5	Pittsburgh Penguins (1999–2000)	13–49–7–4	L
74	March 26, 2000	1–4	Los Angeles Kings (1999–2000)	13–50–7–4	L
75	March 28, 2000	2–5	@ Washington Capitals (1999–2000)	13–51–7–4	L
76	March 29, 2000	2–3	Phoenix Coyotes (1999–2000)	13–52–7–4	L
77	March 31, 2000	0–6	@ New Jersey Devils (1999–2000)	13–53–7–4	L

April: 1–4–0–0 (home: 1–2–0–0; road: 0–2–0–0)

Game	Date	Score	Opponent	Record	Recap
78	April 2, 2000	5–4	New York Islanders (1999–2000)	14–53–7–4	W
79	April 4, 2000	3–5	Philadelphia Flyers (1999–2000)	14–54–7–4	L
80	April 6, 2000	1–3	@ Philadelphia Flyers (1999–2000)	14–55–7–4	L
81	April 8, 2000	3–4	Carolina Hurricanes (1999–2000)	14–56–7–4	L
82	April 9, 2000	1–2	@ Carolina Hurricanes (1999–2000)	14–57–7–4	L

Legend: W Win (2 points) L Loss (0 points) T Tie (1 point) OTL Overtime loss (1 point)

== Player statistics ==
=== Scoring ===
- Position abbreviations: C = Center; D = Defense; G = Goaltender; LW = Left wing; RW = Right wing
- † = Joined team via a transaction (e.g., trade, waivers, signing) during the season. Stats reflect time with the Thrashers only.
- ‡ = Left team via a transaction (e.g., trade, waivers, release) during the season. Stats reflect time with the Thrashers only.

No.	Player	Pos	Regular season					
No.	Player	Pos	GP	G	A	Pts	+/-	PIM
15	Andrew Brunette	LW	81	23	27	50	−32	30
21	Ray Ferraro	C	81	19	25	44	−33	88
19	Nelson Emerson‡	RW	58	14	19	33	−24	47
38	Yannick Tremblay	D	75	10	21	31	−42	22
11	Dean Sylvester	RW	52	16	10	26	−14	24
13	Patrik Stefan	C	72	5	20	25	−20	30
14	Mike Stapleton	C	62	10	12	22	−29	30
2	Petr Buzek	D	63	5	14	19	−22	41
8	Darryl Shannon‡	D	49	5	13	18	−14	65
16	Kelly Buchberger‡	RW	68	5	12	17	−34	139
29	Johan Garpenlov	LW	73	2	14	16	−30	31
9	Hnat Domenichelli†	LW	27	6	9	15	−21	4
24	Andreas Karlsson	C	51	5	9	14	−17	14
12	Steve Guolla†	C	20	4	9	13	−13	4
28	Donald Audette†	RW	14	7	4	11	−4	12
27 (Note: Lambert wore number 10 through December 8.)	Denny Lambert	LW	73	5	6	11	−17	219
22 (Note: Donovan wore number 12 in his first three games.)	Shean Donovan†	RW	33	4	7	11	−13	18
5	Gord Murphy	D	58	1	10	11	−26	38
4	Chris Tamer	D	69	2	8	10	−32	91
33	Maxim Galanov	D	40	4	3	7	−12	20
39	Per Svartvadet	C	38	3	4	7	−8	6
17	Matt Johnson	LW	64	2	5	7	−11	144
8	Frantisek Kaberle†	D	14	1	6	7	−13	6
42	Ed Ward‡	RW	44	5	1	6	−5	44
6	David Harlock	D	44	0	6	6	−8	36
25	Steve Staios	D	27	2	3	5	−5	66
18 (Note: Botterill wore number 20 in his first game.)	Jason Botterill‡	LW	25	1	4	5	−7	17
3	Sergei Vyshedkevich	D	7	1	3	4	−3	2
28	Kevin Dean‡	D	23	1	0	1	−5	14
36	Rumun Ndur†	D	27	1	0	1	−17	17
37	Herbert Vasiljevs	RW	7	1	0	1	−3	4
23	Brett Clark	D	14	0	1	1	−12	4
23	Martin Prochazka	RW	3	0	1	1	−1	0
26	Bryan Adams	C	2	0	0	0	−1	0
22	Eric Bertrand†‡	LW	8	0	0	0	−5	4
30	Scott Fankhouser	G	16	0	0	0		4
28	Geordie Kinnear	D	4	0	0	0	−1	13
35	Scott Langkow	G	15	0	0	0		0
34	Norm Maracle	G	32	0	0	0		0
7	Chris McAlpine†	D	3	0	0	0	−4	2
1	Damian Rhodes	G	28	0	0	0		2
31	Rick Tabaracci†‡	G	1	0	0	0		0
9	Vladimir Vujtek	LW	3	0	0	0	0	0

=== Goaltending ===
- † = Joined team via a transaction (e.g., trade, waivers, signing) during the season. Stats reflect time with the Thrashers only.
- ‡ = Left team via a transaction (e.g., trade, waivers, release) during the season. Stats reflect time with the Thrashers only.

No.	Player	Regular season									
No.	Player	GP	W	L	T	SA	GA	GAA	SV%	SO	TOI
1	Damian Rhodes	28	5	19	3	803	101	3.88	.874	1	1561
34	Norm Maracle	32	4	19	2	852	94	3.49	.890	1	1618
35	Scott Langkow	15	3	11	0	395	55	4.31	.861	0	765
30	Scott Fankhouser	16	2	11	2	451	49	3.20	.891	0	920
31	Rick Tabaracci†‡	1	0	1	0	32	4	4.07	.875	0	59

== Awards and records ==
=== Awards ===
Type	Award/honor	Recipient	Ref
League (in-season)	NHL All-Star Game selection	Petr Buzek	
Team	Community Service Award	David Harlock	
Team	Players' Player Award	Denny Lambert	
Team	Three Stars of the Game Award	Ray Ferraro	

=== Milestones ===
Milestone	Player	Date	Ref
First game	Patrik Stefan	October 2, 1999	
First game	Per Svartvadet	October 2, 1999	
First game	Andreas Karlsson	November 22, 1999	
First game	Scott Fankhouser	December 23, 1999	
First game	Bryan Adams	March 4, 2000	
First game	Geordie Kinnear	March 6, 2000	
First game	Sergei Vyshedkevich	March 29, 2000	

== Transactions ==
The Thrashers were involved in the following transactions during the 1999–2000 season.

=== Trades ===
June 18, 1999	To Atlanta Thrashers Damian Rhodes	To Ottawa Senators Future considerations
June 21, 1999	To Atlanta Thrashers Andrew Brunette	To Nashville Predators 4th round pick in 2000 - Matt Hendricks
June 25, 1999	To Atlanta Thrashers 4th round pick in 1999 - Rob Zepp; 9th round pick in 1999 - Ray DiLauro	To Vancouver Canucks Future considerations
June 25, 1999	To Atlanta Thrashers Andreas Karlsson	To Calgary Flames Future considerations
June 25, 1999	To Atlanta Thrashers Dean Sylvester	To Buffalo Sabres Future considerations
June 25, 1999	To Atlanta Thrashers Scott Langkow	To Phoenix Coyotes Future considerations
June 25, 1999	To Atlanta Thrashers Sergei Vyshedkevich	To New Jersey Devils Future considerations
June 25, 1999	To Atlanta Thrashers Ulf Samuelsson	To Detroit Red Wings Future considerations
June 25, 1999	To Atlanta Thrashers 1st round pick in 1999 - Patrik Stefan	To Vancouver Canucks 1st round pick in 1999 - Daniel Sedin; 3rd round pick in 2000 - Max Birbraer
June 25, 1999	To Atlanta Thrashers Gord Murphy; Herbert Vasiljevs; Daniel Tjarnqvist; 6th round pick in 1999 - Justin Cox	To Florida Panthers Trevor Kidd
June 25, 1999	To Atlanta Thrashers Randy Robitaille	To Boston Bruins Peter Ferraro
June 26, 1999	To Atlanta Thrashers Future considerations	To Nashville Predators Phil Crowe
June 26, 1999	To Atlanta Thrashers Per Svartvadet	To Dallas Stars 6th round pick in 1999 - Justin Cox
July 15, 1999	To Atlanta Thrashers Jason Botterill; Cash	To Dallas Stars Jamie Pushor
July 15, 1999	To Atlanta Thrashers Martin Prochazka	To Toronto Maple Leafs 6th round pick in 2001 - Maxim Kondratiev
August 16, 1999	To Atlanta Thrashers Denny Lambert	To Nashville Predators Randy Robitaille
September 27, 1999	To Atlanta Thrashers 8th round pick in 2000 - Evan Nielsen	To Anaheim Mighty Ducks Ladislav Kohn
October 15, 1999	To Atlanta Thrashers Cash	To Philadelphia Flyers Jody Hull
October 29, 1999	To Atlanta Thrashers 4th round pick in 2000 - Carl Mallette	To Vancouver Canucks Corey Schwab
October 29, 1999	To Atlanta Thrashers Mikko Kuparinen	To Tampa Bay Lightning Future considerations
November 1, 1999	To Atlanta Thrashers Eric Bertrand; Wes Mason	To New Jersey Devils Jeff Williams; Sylvain Cloutier; 7th round pick in 2000 - Ken Magowan
December 8, 1999	To Atlanta Thrashers Shean Donovan	To Colorado Avalanche Rick Tabaracci
December 9, 1999	To Atlanta Thrashers Brian Wesenberg	To Philadelphia Flyers Eric Bertrand
December 14, 1999	To Atlanta Thrashers 9th round pick in 2000 - Mark McRae	To Dallas Stars Kevin Dean
January 25, 2000	To Atlanta Thrashers Bill Huard	To Los Angeles Kings Future considerations
February 11, 2000	To Atlanta Thrashers Hnat Domenichelli; Dmitri Vlasenkov	To Calgary Flames Jason Botterill; Darryl Shannon
February 18, 2000	To Atlanta Thrashers Joel Irving	To Calgary Flames Future considerations
March 11, 2000	To Atlanta Thrashers Chris McAlpine	To Tampa Bay Lightning Mikko Kuparinen
March 13, 2000	To Atlanta Thrashers Donald Audette; Frantisek Kaberle	To Los Angeles Kings Kelly Buchberger; Nelson Emerson
March 14, 2000	To Atlanta Thrashers 6th round pick in 2000 - Jeff Dwyer; 6th round pick in 2001 - Pasi Nurminen	To Philadelphia Flyers Kirby Law
March 14, 2000	To Atlanta Thrashers 7th round pick in 2001 - Colin FitzRandolph	To Anaheim Mighty Ducks Ed Ward
March 14, 2000	To Atlanta Thrashers 6th round pick in 2000 - Jeff Dwyer; 6th round pick in 2001 - Pasi Nurminen	To Philadelphia Flyers Kirby Law
June 2, 2000	To Atlanta Thrashers 6th round pick in 2000 - Darcy Hordichuk	To Montreal Canadiens Future considerations

=== Free agents signed ===
June 28, 1999	From Owen Sound Platers (OHL) Dan Snyder
July 1, 1999	From Michigan State (CCHA) Bryan Adams
July 6, 1999	From Ohio State (CCHA) Hugo Boisvert
July 6, 1999	From Adirondack Red Wings (AHL) Kirby Law
July 13, 1999	From Indianapolis Ice (IHL) Bob Lachance
July 19, 1999	From HC Vítkovice (ECH) Vladimír Vůjtek
July 20, 1999	From Ottawa Senators Nelson Emerson
August 2, 1999	From Los Angeles Kings Ray Ferraro
August 12, 1999	From University of Michigan (CCHA) Sean Ritchlin
August 12, 1999	From New Jersey Devils Geordie Kinnear
August 24, 1999	From Massachusetts-Lowell (HE) Scott Fankhouser
November 3, 1999	From Washington Capitals Rick Tabaracci
March 24, 2000	From Northern Michigan (WCHA) J.P. Vigier
March 27, 2000	From R.P.I. (ECAC) Brian Pothier
April 11, 2000	From R.P.I. (ECAC) Brad Tapper

=== Free agents lost ===
October 18, 1999	To Philadelphia Flyers Ulf Samuelsson

=== Waivers claims ===
September 27, 1999	From New Jersey Devils Jeff Williams
September 27, 1999	From Toronto Maple Leafs Ladislav Kohn
December 11, 1999	From New York Rangers Rumun Ndur
March 1, 2000	From Tampa Bay Lightning Steve Guolla

=== Lost on waivers ===
September 27, 1999	To St. Louis Blues Terry Yake

== Draft picks ==
=== NHL Expansion Draft ===
These results are numbered 1–26 for aesthetic purposes, but the players were not necessarily chosen in this order. As the Thrashers were the only team participating in the draft, the order is inconsequential.

#	Player	Drafted from
1.	Trevor Kidd (G)	Carolina Hurricanes
2.	Norm Maracle (G)	Detroit Red Wings
3.	Corey Schwab (G)	Tampa Bay Lightning
4.	Petr Buzek (D)	Dallas Stars
5.	Brett Clark (D)	Montreal Canadiens
6.	Kevin Dean (D)	New Jersey Devils
7.	Maxim Galanov (D)	Pittsburgh Penguins
8.	David Harlock (D)	New York Islanders
9.	Jamie Pushor (D)	Mighty Ducks of Anaheim
10.	Darryl Shannon (D)	Buffalo Sabres
11.	Chris Tamer (D)	New York Rangers
12.	Mark Tinordi (D)	Washington Capitals
13.	Yannick Tremblay (D)	Toronto Maple Leafs
14.	Kelly Buchberger (RW)	Edmonton Oilers
15.	Sylvain Cloutier (C)	Chicago Blackhawks
16.	Phil Crowe (RW)	Ottawa Senators
17.	Peter Ferraro (RW)	Boston Bruins
18.	Johan Garpenlov (LW)	Florida Panthers
19.	Jody Hull (RW)	Philadelphia Flyers
20.	Matt Johnson (LW)	Los Angeles Kings
21.	Tomi Kallio (LW)	Colorado Avalanche
22.	Steve Staios (RW/D)	Vancouver Canucks
23.	Mike Stapleton (C)	Phoenix Coyotes
24.	Ed Ward (RW)	Calgary Flames
25.	Terry Yake (C)	St. Louis Blues
26.	Alexei Yegorov (RW)	San Jose Sharks

=== NHL entry draft ===
Atlanta's picks at the 1999 NHL entry draft.

Round	#	Player	Position	Nationality	College/junior/club team (league)
1	1	Patrik Stefan	Center	Czech Republic	Long Beach Ice Dogs (IHL)
2	30	Luke Sellars	Defense	Canada	Ottawa 67's (OHL)
3	68	Zdenek Blatny	Left wing	Czech Republic	Seattle Thunderbirds (WHL)
4	98	David Kaczowka	Left wing	Canada	Seattle Thunderbirds (WHL)
4	99	Rob Zepp	Goaltender	Canada	Plymouth Whalers (OHL)
5	128	Derek MacKenzie	Center	Canada	Sudbury Wolves (OHL)
6	159	Yuri Dobryshkin	Right wing	Russia	Krylya Sovetov Moscow (Russia)
7	188	Stephen Baby	Right wing	United States	Green Bay Gamblers (USHL)
8	217	Garnet Exelby	Defense	Canada	Saskatoon Blades (WHL)
9	245	Tommi Santala	Center	Finland	Jokerit (Finland)
9	246	Ray DiLauro	Defense	United States	St. Lawrence University (ECAC)

== See also ==
- 1999–2000 NHL season
