= Orlando Solar Bears =

ECHL ice hockey team

- City: Orlando, Florida
- League: ECHL
- Conference: Eastern
- Division: South
- Founded: 2012 (current ECHL franchise); 1994 (first IHL franchise)
- Home arena: Kia Center
- Colors: Solar purple, seafoam green, sunset orange, sunrise gold, white, black
- Owner: RDV Sports, Inc.
- Head coach: Matt Macdonald
- Media: Orlando Sentinel, WJRR, ECHL.TV,
- Affiliates: Tampa Bay Lightning (NHL); Syracuse Crunch (AHL); Rochester Americans (AHL)
- Website: orlandosolarbearshockey.com

The Orlando Solar Bears are a professional ice hockey team that plays their home games at Kia Center in Orlando, Florida. They play in the South Division of the ECHL's Eastern Conference and are affiliated with the Tampa Bay Lightning of the National Hockey League.

== History ==
Orlando Pro Hockey Operations, L.P. and primary owners Joe Haleski, Bob Ohrablo, and Jason Siegel, obtained an expansion franchise in the ECHL in November 2011. The team revived the name of the original Orlando Solar Bears, who played in the International Hockey League from 1995 to 2001. The franchise also retained the original colors of their IHL predecessor, while adding the color Sunrise Gold. They are Orlando's third professional hockey team, after the original Solar Bears and Orlando Seals (2002–2004). Together with the Florida Everblades of Estero and the Jacksonville Icemen, they are one of three ECHL franchises in Florida. They are the eighth ECHL franchise to have the name of a previous IHL franchise, joining four current teams (Cincinnati Cyclones, Fort Wayne Komets, Utah Grizzlies and Kalamazoo Wings) and three former teams (the defunct Phoenix Roadrunners and Long Beach Ice Dogs; and the Peoria Rivermen).

The Solar Bears utilize RDV Sportsplex Ice Den as their training facility and offices.

For their first season in 2012–13, the team became affiliated with the Minnesota Wild of the NHL and the Houston Aeros of the AHL. They hired former NHL player Drake Berehowsky as the team's first head coach. During their inaugural season, the Solar Bears posted a 20–11–1–4 record on home ice; however, the team struggled on the road and missed the playoffs with a 28–27–7 overall record.

The Solar Bears then named Vince Williams, a former Solar Bears defenseman, as head coach for the 2013–14 season. They also added an affiliation with the Toronto Maple Leafs of the NHL and the Toronto Marlies of the AHL while also keeping the Wild as an affiliate. The Leafs extended their affiliation with the Solar Bears for an additional two years in 2014 and the Leafs became the Solar Bears' sole NHL affiliate.

The Solar Bears hosted the 2015 ECHL All-Star Game at Amway Center on January 21, 2015.

For the 2015–16 season, Anthony Noreen became the head coach of the Solar Bears after guiding the United States Hockey League's Youngstown Phantoms to the league championship and being named USHL Coach of the Year. The Solar Bears also renewed their affiliation with the Maple Leafs and Marlies. The Solar Bears missed the 2016 playoffs and then started the 2016–17 season with a 5-5-1-0 record. On November 14, 2016, head coach Anthony Noreen was replaced by former Solar Bears' head coach Drake Berehowsky.

In May 2017, the DeVos family, owners of the Orlando Magic, agreed to purchase the Solar Bears when the Orlando Pro Hockey Operations, L.P. ownership group informed them that they could no longer sustain the team. The DeVos family were the owners of the IHL Solar Bears from 1995 through 2001.

In the 2018 Kelly Cup playoffs, the Solar Bears swept the South Carolina Stingrays to win their first playoff series, before losing to the regular season champions, the Florida Everblades, in the division finals. After the season, the Solar Bears and the Toronto Maple Leafs ended their five-season affiliation when Toronto affiliated with the expansion Newfoundland Growlers team. The Solar Bears then affiliated with the Tampa Bay Lightning on a three-year agreement, which was then extended through at least the 2022–23 season.

On April 25, 2022, the team announced that they and Drake Berehowsky had mutually agreed to part ways.

== Media ==
The radio broadcasts for Orlando Solar Bears games are streamed online through iHeart Radio on the online channel for WYGM "740 the Game" and on Mixlr. News6 WKMG broadcasts select games throughout the season. Joey Battaino, formerly of the OHL’s Saginaw Spirit, is the play-by-play announcer for the Solar Bears.

As with all ECHL teams, video of Orlando Solar Bears games are available on FloSports and ECHL.TV, usually with a choice between home or away radio feeds for audio. The 2022-2023 season home opener was simulcast on WKMG-TV (Orlando's CBS affiliate) and Cozi TV.

== Season-by-season results ==
Regular season											Playoffs				
Season	GP	W	L	OTL	SOL	Pts	GF	GA	Standing	Avg. attendance	Year	1st round	2nd round	3rd round	Kelly Cup
2012–13	72	28	37	3	4	63	197	253	5th, South	6,668	2013	did not qualify			
2013–14	72	43	24	2	3	91	225	219	2nd, South	6,355	2014	L, 2–4, CIN	—	—	—
2014–15	72	37	25	6	4	84	236	215	4th, East	6,209	2015	L, 2–4, FLA	—	—	—
2015–16	72	33	30	4	5	75	224	232	3rd, South	6,226	2016	did not qualify			
2016–17	72	36	26	7	3	82	260	258	4th, South	5,498	2017	L, 3–4, FLA	—	—	—
2017–18	72	33	30	6	3	75	212	228	3rd, South	5,461	2018	W, 4–0, SC	L, 1–4, FLA	—	—
2018–19	72	41	25	5	1	88	251	238	2nd, South	5,612	2019	W, 4–1, SC	L, 1–4, FLA	—	—
2019–20	62	27	29	5	1	60	170	180	5th, South	5,632	2020	Season cancelled			
2020–21	72	36	29	6	1	79	218	232	5th, Eastern	2,464	2021	did not qualify			
2021–22	71	33	31	6	1	73	197	226	5th, South	5,120	2022	did not qualify			
2022–23	72	30	33	8	1	69	221	264	6th, South	6,033	2023	did not qualify			
2023–24	72	38	24	7	3	86	220	206	4th, South	—	2024	W, 4–2, GRN	L, 1–4, FLA	—	—
2024–25	72	37	25	10	0	84	196	200	4th, South	—	2025	W, 4–3, SC	L, 1–4, FLA	—	—
2025–26	72	29	38	4	1	63	186	230	7th, South	—	2026	did not qualify			

== Players ==
=== Team captains ===
==== First franchise ====
===== IHL =====
- Unknown, 1994–97
- Hubie McDonough, 1998–1999
- Geordie Kinnear, 1999–00
- Dan Snyder, 2000–01

===== ECHL =====
- Ryan Cruthers, 2012–13
- Eric Baier, 2013–2017
- Stefan Della Rovere, 2014–2015
- Sean Zimmerman, 2017–2018
- Chris LeBlanc, 2018–2021
- Kevin Lohan, 2021–2022
- Ross Olsson, 2022–2023
- Aaron Luchuk, 2023
- Tyler Bird, 2023–present

=== Notable players ===
Orlando Solar Bears alumni that advanced to play in the NHL after playing for the club:

- Bryan Adams (Note: IHL franchise)
- Hugo Alnefelt
- Mel Angelstad (Note: IHL franchise)
- Allan Bester (Note: IHL franchise)
- Jason Blake (ice hockey) (Note: IHL franchise)
- Jason Botterill (Note: IHL franchise)
- Wade Brookbank (Note: IHL franchise)
- Jeff Buchanan (Note: IHL franchise)
- Brett Clark (Note: IHL franchise)
- Mike Condon
- B. J. Crombeen
- John Curry
- Tye Felhaber
- Brian Felsner (Note: IHL franchise)
- Zachary Fucale
- Christopher Gibson
- David Gove (Note: IHL franchise)
- Eric Healey (Note: IHL franchise)
- Darcy Hordichuk (Note: IHL franchise)
- Connor Ingram
- Andreas Karlsson (Note: IHL franchise)
- Kasimir Kaskisuo
- Geordie Kinnear (Note: IHL franchise)
- Dieter Kochan (Note: IHL franchise)
- Darcy Kuemper
- Kirby Law (Note: IHL franchise)
- Mike Liambas
- Jason MacDonald (Note: IHL franchise)
- Mason Marchment
- Spencer Martin
- Eric Nickulas (Note: IHL franchise)
- Brian Pothier (Note: IHL franchise)
- Jack Rodewald
- Ryan Reaves
- Ben Simon (Note: IHL franchise)
- Dan Snyder (Note: IHL franchise)
- Garret Sparks
- Brad Tapper (Note: IHL franchise)
- Brad Tiley (Note: IHL franchise)
- J. P. Vigier (Note: IHL franchise)
- Mike Weaver (Note: IHL franchise)

Orlando Solar Bears that played in the NHL before playing with the team:

- Akim Aliu
- Bill Armstrong (Note: IHL franchise)
- Scott Bailey (Note: IHL franchise)
- Dave Barr (Note: IHL franchise)
- Mark Beaufait (Note: IHL franchise)
- Zac Boyer (Note: IHL franchise)
- Mike Brodeur
- David Broll
- Denis Chervyakov (Note: IHL franchise)
- Dave Chyzowski (Note: IHL franchise)
- Sylvain Cloutier (Note: IHL franchise)
- Stefan Della Rovere
- Mike Duco
- Craig Duncanson (Note: IHL franchise)
- Allan Egeland (Note: IHL franchise)
- Neil Eisenhut (Note: IHL franchise)
- Kelly Fairchild (Note: IHL franchise)
- Scott Fankhouser (Note: IHL franchise)
- Mark Ferner (Note: IHL franchise)
- Craig Fisher (Note: IHL franchise)
- Trevor Gillies
- Brandon Halverson
- Ben Hankinson (Note: IHL franchise)
- Mike Hartman (Note: IHL franchise)
- Cal Heeter
- Terry Hollinger (Note: IHL franchise)
- Bill Huard (Note: IHL franchise)
- Jody Hull (Note: IHL franchise)
- Bob Joyce (Note: IHL franchise)
- Duane Joyce (Note: IHL franchise)
- Kevin Kaminski (Note: IHL franchise)
- Todd Krygier (Note: IHL franchise)
- Jack LaFontaine
- Bryce Lampman
- Scott Langkow (Note: IHL franchise)
- Chad LaRose
- John LeBlanc (Note: IHL franchise)
- Chris LiPuma (Note: IHL franchise)
- David Littman (Note: IHL franchise)
- Norm Maracle (Note: IHL franchise)
- Alan May (Note: IHL franchise)
- Hubie McDonough (Note: IHL franchise)
- Carson McMillan
- Alexei Melnichuk
- Rumun Ndur (Note: IHL franchise)
- Patrick Neaton (Note: IHL franchise)
- Steven Oleksy
- Grigorijs Panteļejevs (Note: IHL franchise)
- Rob Pearson (Note: IHL franchise)
- Todd Richards (Note: IHL franchise)
- Ken Sabourin (Note: IHL franchise)
- Yves Sarault (Note: IHL franchise)
- Yann Sauvé
- Reggie Savage (Note: IHL franchise)
- Pierre` Sévigny (Note: IHL franchise)
- Gary Shuchuk (Note: IHL franchise)
- Richard Shulmistra (Note: IHL franchise)
- Jarrod Skalde (Note: IHL franchise)
- Mackenzie Skapski
- Andrei Skopintsev (Note: IHL franchise)
- Kevin Smyth (Note: IHL franchise)
- Per Svartvadet (Note: IHL franchise)
- Dean Sylvester (Note: IHL franchise)
- Rick Tabaracci (Note: IHL franchise)
- Ben Thomson
- Hannu Toivonen
- Mike Torchia (Note: IHL franchise)
- Alfie Turcotte (Note: IHL franchise)
- Herberts Vasiļjevs (Note: IHL franchise)
- Sergei Vyshedkevich (Note: IHL franchise)
