= 1999–2000 Philadelphia Flyers season =

NHL hockey team season

1999–2000 Philadelphia Flyers
- Atlantic Division champions
- Division: 1st Atlantic
- Conference: 1st Eastern
- 1999–2000 record: 45–25–12–3
- Home record: 25–9–7–3
- Road record: 20–16–5–0
- Goals for: 237
- Goals against: 179

Team information
- General manager: Bob Clarke
- Coach: Roger Neilson (Note: Neilson went on medical leave on February 20 and Ramsay served as interim head coach for the remainder of the season.); Craig Ramsay (interim)
- Captain: Eric Lindros (Oct.–Mar.); Eric Desjardins (Mar.–May)
- Alternate captains: Rod Brind'Amour (Oct.–Jan.); Eric Desjardins (Oct.–Mar.); John LeClair (Jan.–May.); Mark Recchi (Mar.–May)
- Arena: First Union Center
- Average attendance: 19,634
- Minor league affiliates: Philadelphia Phantoms; Trenton Titans

Team leaders
- Goals: John LeClair (40)
- Assists: Mark Recchi (63)
- Points: Mark Recchi (91)
- Penalty minutes: Craig Berube (162)
- Plus/minus: Eric Desjardins (+20); Mark Recchi (+20)
- Wins: John Vanbiesbrouck (25)
- Goals against average: Brian Boucher (1.91)

The 1999–2000 Philadelphia Flyers season was the franchise's 33rd season in the National Hockey League (NHL). One of the most tumultuous seasons in franchise history, the Flyers reached the Eastern Conference finals, losing in seven games to the New Jersey Devils, blowing a 3–1 series lead in the process.

== Off-season ==
After going unclaimed in the 1999 NHL expansion draft, longtime goaltender Ron Hextall was waived by the Flyers on July 1 for the purpose of buying out the final season of his contract. Hextall cleared waivers and announced his retirement on September 6, 1999.

Longtime broadcaster Gene Hart, who was awarded the Foster Hewitt Memorial Award in 1997, died from a variety of illnesses on July 14.

A little over a week later on July 23, defenseman Dmitri Tertyshny, coming off his rookie season, was fatally injured in a boating accident. Tertyshny was on a boating trip to Okanagan Lake in British Columbia with two players from the Flyers' minor-league affiliate Philadelphia Phantoms, Francis Belanger and Mikhail Chernov, when a freak accident caused him to suffer fatal injuries. The boat hit a wave and caused him to fall forward overboard. The boat ran over him and its propeller slashed his neck and his jugular vein.

== Regular season ==
Head coach Roger Neilson was diagnosed with bone cancer, forcing him to step aside in February 2000 to undergo treatment, so assistant coach Craig Ramsay took over as interim coach for the rest of the season; Neilson later recovered but was informed that he would not be returning.

In January, longtime Flyer and fan favorite Rod Brind'Amour was shipped to the Carolina Hurricanes for Keith Primeau, with the intention of acquiring a big center to complement Eric Lindros. Meanwhile, the strife between Flyers management (particularly GM Bob Clarke) and Lindros, continued to worsen. Less than a month after Ramsay took over, Lindros suffered his second concussion of the season. He played several games after the initial hit and afterwards criticized the team's training staff for failing to initially diagnose the concussion after it happened. It was after this that the Flyers' organization decided to strip Lindros of the captaincy on March 27 and name defenseman Eric Desjardins the team's captain.

With Lindros out indefinitely, the Flyers rallied to overcome the distractions and a 15-point deficit in the standings to win the Atlantic Division and the No. 1 seed in the East on the last day of the regular season.

=== Season standings ===
Atlantic Division
No.	CR		GP	W	L	T	OTL	GF	GA	Pts
1	1	**Philadelphia Flyers**	82	45	22	12	3	237	179	105
2	4	**New Jersey Devils**	82	45	24	8	5	251	203	103
3	7	**Pittsburgh Penguins**	82	37	31	8	6	241	236	88
4	11	New York Rangers	82	29	38	12	3	218	246	73
5	13	New York Islanders	82	24	48	9	1	194	275	58

Note: CR = Conference rank; GP = Games played; W = Wins; L = Losses; T = Ties; OTL=Overtime loss; GF = Goals for; GA = Goals against; PIM=Penalties in Minutes; Pts = Points
Bolded teams qualified for the playoffs.

Eastern Conference
R		Div	GP	W	L	T	OTL	GF	GA	Pts
**1**	**z – Philadelphia Flyers**	**AT**	**82**	**45**	**22**	**12**	**3**	**237**	**179**	105
**2**	**y – Washington Capitals**	**SE**	**82**	**44**	**24**	**12**	**2**	**227**	**194**	102
**3**	**y – Toronto Maple Leafs**	**NE**	**82**	**45**	**27**	**7**	**3**	**246**	**222**	100
**4**	**New Jersey Devils**	**AT**	**82**	**45**	**24**	**8**	**5**	**251**	**203**	103
**5**	**Florida Panthers**	**SE**	**82**	**43**	**27**	**6**	**6**	**244**	**209**	98
**6**	**Ottawa Senators**	**NE**	**82**	**41**	**28**	**11**	**2**	**244**	**210**	95
**7**	**Pittsburgh Penguins**	**AT**	**82**	**37**	**31**	**8**	**6**	**241**	**236**	88
**8**	**Buffalo Sabres**	**NE**	**82**	**35**	**32**	**11**	**4**	**213**	**204**	85
8.5
9	Carolina Hurricanes	SE	82	37	35	10	0	217	216	84
10	Montreal Canadiens	NE	82	35	34	9	4	196	194	83
11	New York Rangers	AT	82	29	38	12	3	218	246	73
12	Boston Bruins	NE	82	24	33	19	6	210	248	73
13	New York Islanders	AT	82	24	48	9	1	194	275	58
14	Tampa Bay Lightning	SE	82	19	47	9	7	204	310	54
15	Atlanta Thrashers	SE	82	14	57	7	4	170	313	39

Divisions: AT – Atlantic, NE – Northeast, SE – Southeast

bold – Qualified for playoffs; z – Won conference; y – Won division

== Playoffs ==
They easily defeated their first round opponent, the Buffalo Sabres, in five games. Primeau's goal in the fifth overtime of Game 4 against the team's second-round opponent, the Pittsburgh Penguins, turned that series in the Flyers' favor as they won in six games, coming back from a 2–0 series deficit. After dropping Game 1 to New Jersey in the Eastern Conference finals, the Flyers peeled off three straight wins to take a 3–1 series lead. But New Jersey refused to give up. After New Jersey won Game 5, Lindros returned to the lineup for the first time since March for Game 6 in another losing effort. Early in Game 7, Lindros was on the receiving end of a hit by Scott Stevens, giving him another concussion and leaving the Philadelphia crowd deflated. Without Lindros, the Flyers lost the decisive game by a score of 2–1. To date, it is the only time (of 64 total series) a team in the conference finals or semifinals round has held a 3–1 series lead and lost. It was the second time in franchise history the team lost a series after leading 3 games to 1. New Jersey went on to win the Stanley Cup.

== Schedule and results ==
=== Preseason ===
1999 preseason
Preseason: 2–6–0 (home: 2–2–0; road: 0–4–0)

Game	Date	Score	Opponent	Record	Recap
1	September 17	2–3	@ Washington Capitals	0–1–0	L
2	September 18	2–5	Detroit Red Wings	0–2–0	L
–^{[a]}	September 21	6–1	@ Philadelphia Phantoms	–^{[b]}	W
3	September 23	1–2	@ New York Rangers	0–3–0	L
4	September 24	3–2	New York Rangers	1–3–0	W
5	September 25	2–4	@ New Jersey Devils	1–4–0	L
6	September 26	10–2	New Jersey Devils	2–4–0	W
7	September 27	2–8	Washington Capitals	2–5–0	L
8	September 28	0–3	@ Detroit Red Wings	2–6–0	L
Notes:^{a} Benefit game played for Dmitri Tertyshny's family at the First Union Spectrum.^{b} This game was not counted toward the team's preseason totals.

Legend: W Win (2 points) L Loss (0 points) T Tie (1 point) OTL Overtime loss (1 point)

=== Regular season ===
1999–2000 regular season
October: 6–5–1–1, 14 points (home: 5–3–0–1; road: 1–2–1–0)

Game	Date	Score	Opponent	Decision	Record	Points	Recap
1	October 2	0–3	Ottawa Senators	Vanbiesbrouck	0–1–0–0	0	L
2	October 7	0–2	Carolina Hurricanes	Vanbiesbrouck	0–2–0–0	0	L
3	October 9	1–1 OT	@ Boston Bruins	Vanbiesbrouck	0–2–1–0	1	T
4	October 12	4–5	@ Washington Capitals	Vanbiesbrouck	0–3–1–0	1	L
5	October 14	4–5 OT	Montreal Canadiens	Boucher	0–3–1–1	2	OTL
6	October 16	2–3	@ Detroit Red Wings	Vanbiesbrouck	0–4–1–1	2	L
7	October 17	5–2	Buffalo Sabres	Vanbiesbrouck	1–4–1–1	4	W
8	October 20	5–0	New York Rangers	Vanbiesbrouck	2–4–1–1	6	W
9	October 22	2–0	@ New York Rangers	Vanbiesbrouck	3–4–1–1	8	W
10	October 24	2–0	Florida Panthers	Vanbiesbrouck	4–4–1–1	10	W
11	October 26	2–5	Vancouver Canucks	Vanbiesbrouck	4–5–1–1	10	L
12	October 28	5–4 OT	Colorado Avalanche	Vanbiesbrouck	5–5–1–1	12	W
13	October 30	5–3	New Jersey Devils	Boucher	6–5–1–1	14	W

November: 7–2–3–0, 17 points (home: 4–0–1–0; road: 3–2–2–0)

Game	Date	Score	Opponent	Decision	Record	Points	Recap
14	November 3	3–3 OT	@ Mighty Ducks of Anaheim	Vanbiesbrouck	6–5–2–1	15	T
15	November 5	3–1	@ San Jose Sharks	Vanbiesbrouck	7–5–2–1	17	W
16	November 6	5–3	@ Los Angeles Kings	Vanbiesbrouck	8–5–2–1	19	W
17	November 9	1–2	@ New Jersey Devils	Vanbiesbrouck	8–6–2–1	19	L
18	November 11	4–1	Carolina Hurricanes	Boucher	9–6–2–1	21	W
19	November 13	3–2	San Jose Sharks	Vanbiesbrouck	10–6–2–1	23	W
20	November 18	1–1 OT	Dallas Stars	Vanbiesbrouck	10–6–3–1	24	T
21	November 20	4–1	Tampa Bay Lightning	Boucher	11–6–3–1	26	W
22	November 22	1–4	@ Tampa Bay Lightning	Vanbiesbrouck	11–7–3–1	26	L
23	November 24	6–1	@ Florida Panthers	Vanbiesbrouck	12–7–3–1	28	W
24	November 26	3–2 OT	Toronto Maple Leafs	Boucher	13–7–3–1	30	W
25	November 28	3–3 OT	@ Ottawa Senators	Vanbiesbrouck	13–7–4–1	31	T

December: 8–3–2–0, 18 points (home: 4–0–2–0; road: 4–3–0–0)

Game	Date	Score	Opponent	Decision	Record	Points	Recap
26	December 2	4–2	@ Buffalo Sabres	Vanbiesbrouck	14–7–4–1	33	W
27	December 4	3–2	@ Montreal Canadiens	Vanbiesbrouck	15–7–4–1	35	W
28	December 5	3–2	St. Louis Blues	Boucher	16–7–4–1	37	W
29	December 9	4–2	Toronto Maple Leafs	Vanbiesbrouck	17–7–4–1	39	W
30	December 11	4–6	@ Toronto Maple Leafs	Vanbiesbrouck	17–8–4–1	39	L
31	December 14	1–3	@ Buffalo Sabres	Boucher	17–9–4–1	39	L
32	December 16	5–3	Phoenix Coyotes	Vanbiesbrouck	18–9–4–1	41	W
33	December 18	4–0	Tampa Bay Lightning	Boucher	19–9–4–1	43	W
34	December 19	1–1 OT	Nashville Predators	Vanbiesbrouck	19–9–5–1	44	T
35	December 22	2–3	@ New Jersey Devils	Vanbiesbrouck	19–10–5–1	44	L
36	December 23	4–4 OT	Atlanta Thrashers	Boucher	19–10–6–1	45	T
37	December 27	5–1	@ Calgary Flames	Vanbiesbrouck	20–10–6–1	47	W
38	December 29	3–2 OT	@ Vancouver Canucks	Vanbiesbrouck	21–10–6–1	49	W

January: 5–4–3–0, 13 points (home: 3–1–1–0; road: 2–3–2–0)

Game	Date	Score	Opponent	Decision	Record	Points	Recap
39	January 2	4–1	@ New York Islanders	Boucher	22–10–6–1	51	W
40	January 6	3–2	New York Islanders	Vanbiesbrouck	23–10–6–1	53	W
41	January 8	6–2	Pittsburgh Penguins	Vanbiesbrouck	24–10–6–1	55	W
42	January 11	4–3	@ Carolina Hurricanes	Vanbiesbrouck	25–10–6–1	57	W
43	January 14	0–1	@ Atlanta Thrashers	Boucher	25–11–6–1	57	L
44	January 15	1–4	New Jersey Devils	Vanbiesbrouck	25–12–6–1	57	L
45	January 17	1–3	@ Florida Panthers	Vanbiesbrouck	25–13–6–1	57	L
46	January 20	1–1 OT	Ottawa Senators	Boucher	25–13–7–1	58	T
47	January 23	4–4 OT	@ Pittsburgh Penguins	Boucher	25–13–8–1	59	T
48	January 27	4–2	Florida Panthers	Vanbiesbrouck	26–13–8–1	61	W
49	January 29	2–2 OT	@ Montreal Canadiens	Vanbiesbrouck	26–13–9–1	62	T
50	January 30	0–2	@ Washington Capitals	Boucher	26–14–9–1	62	L

February: 7–3–2–0, 16 points (home: 4–1–2–0; road: 3–2–0–0)

Game	Date	Score	Opponent	Decision	Record	Points	Recap
51	February 3	3–3 OT	Mighty Ducks of Anaheim	Vanbiesbrouck	26–14–10–1	63	T
52	February 9	4–2	@ Toronto Maple Leafs	Boucher	27–14–10–1	65	W
53	February 10	2–3	Edmonton Oilers	Vanbiesbrouck	27–15–10–1	65	L
54	February 12	3–2 OT	Buffalo Sabres	Boucher	28–15–10–1	67	W
55	February 15	2–4	@ New Jersey Devils	Boucher	28–16–10–1	67	L
56	February 17	2–2 OT	New York Islanders	Vanbiesbrouck	28–16–11–1	68	T
57	February 19	4–2	Washington Capitals	Boucher	29–16–11–1	70	W
58	February 20	3–2	@ New York Rangers	Vanbiesbrouck	30–16–11–1	72	W
59	February 22	3–1	Chicago Blackhawks	Boucher	31–16–11–1	74	W
60	February 24	4–3 OT	Pittsburgh Penguins	Boucher	32–16–11–1	76	W
61	February 26	5–1	@ New York Islanders	Vanbiesbrouck	33–16–11–1	78	W
62	February 29	2–3	@ St. Louis Blues	Vanbiesbrouck	33–17–11–1	78	L

March: 7–4–1–2, 17 points (home: 3–1–1–2; road: 4–3–0–0)

Game	Date	Score	Opponent	Decision	Record	Points	Recap
63	March 1	0–2	@ Dallas Stars	Boucher	33–18–11–1	78	L
64	March 4	3–0	@ Boston Bruins	Boucher	34–18–11–1	80	W
65	March 5	3–4 OT	New York Islanders	Boucher	34–18–11–2	81	OTL
66	March 8	3–2 OT	@ Tampa Bay Lightning	Vanbiesbrouck	35–18–11–2	83	W
67	March 9	3–1	Washington Capitals	Boucher	36–18–11–2	85	W
68	March 12	1–3	@ Colorado Avalanche	Boucher	36–19–11–2	85	L
69	March 13	4–1	@ Phoenix Coyotes	Vanbiesbrouck	37–19–11–2	87	W
70	March 16	1–1 OT	Montreal Canadiens	Vanbiesbrouck	37–19–12–2	88	T
71	March 18	2–3	New York Rangers	Vanbiesbrouck	37–20–12–2	88	L
72	March 19	6–2	Boston Bruins	Boucher	38–20–12–2	90	W
73	March 21	2–0	@ Nashville Predators	Boucher	39–20–12–2	92	W
74	March 23	2–3 OT	Los Angeles Kings	Boucher	39–20–12–3	93	OTL
75	March 26	3–1	Pittsburgh Penguins	Vanbiesbrouck	40–20–12–3	95	W
76	March 28	2–5	@ Ottawa Senators	Vanbiesbrouck	40–21–12–3	95	L

April: 5–1–0–0, 10 points (home: 2–0–0–0; road: 3–1–0–0)

Game	Date	Score	Opponent	Decision	Record	Points	Recap
77	April 1	3–2	@ Pittsburgh Penguins	Boucher	41–21–12–3	97	W
78	April 2	0–1	@ Carolina Hurricanes	Boucher	41–22–12–3	97	L
79	April 4	5–3	@ Atlanta Thrashers	Boucher	42–22–12–3	99	W
80	April 6	3–1	Atlanta Thrashers	Vanbiesbrouck	43–22–12–3	101	W
81	April 8	3–0	Boston Bruins	Boucher	44–22–12–3	103	W
82	April 9	4–1	@ New York Rangers	Boucher	45–22–12–3	105	W

Legend: W Win (2 points) L Loss (0 points) T Tie (1 point) OTL Overtime loss (1 point)

=== Playoffs ===
2000 Stanley Cup playoffs
Eastern Conference quarterfinals vs. Buffalo Sabres – Flyers win 4–1

Game	Date	Score	Opponent	Decision	Attendance	Series	Recap
1	April 13	3–2	Buffalo Sabres	Boucher	19,607	Flyers lead 1–0	W
2	April 14	2–1	Buffalo Sabres	Boucher	19,752	Flyers lead 2–0	W
3	April 16	2–0	@ Buffalo Sabres	Boucher	18,690	Flyers lead 3–0	W
4	April 18	2–3 OT	@ Buffalo Sabres	Boucher	18,690	Flyers lead 3–1	L
5	April 20	5–2	Buffalo Sabres	Boucher	19,801	Flyers win 4–1	W

Eastern Conference semifinals vs. Pittsburgh Penguins – Flyers win 4–2

Game	Date	Score	Opponent	Decision	Attendance	Series	Recap
1	April 27	0–2	Pittsburgh Penguins	Boucher	19,846	Penguins lead 1–0	L
2	April 29	1–4	Pittsburgh Penguins	Boucher	19,810	Penguins lead 2–0	L
3	May 2	4–3 OT	@ Pittsburgh Penguins	Boucher	17,148	Penguins lead 2–1	W
4	May 4	2–1 5OT	@ Pittsburgh Penguins	Boucher	17,148	Series tied 2–2	W
5	May 7	6–3	Pittsburgh Penguins	Boucher	19,906	Flyers lead 3–2	W
6	May 9	2–1	@ Pittsburgh Penguins	Boucher	17,114	Flyers win 4–2	W

Eastern Conference finals vs. New Jersey Devils – Devils win 4–3

Game	Date	Score	Opponent	Decision	Attendance	Series	Recap
1	May 14	1–4	New Jersey Devils	Boucher	19,779	Devils lead 1–0	L
2	May 16	4–3	New Jersey Devils	Boucher	19,855	Series tied 1–1	W
3	May 18	4–2	@ New Jersey Devils	Boucher	19,040	Flyers lead 2–1	W
4	May 20	3–1	@ New Jersey Devils	Boucher	19,040	Flyers lead 3–1	W
5	May 22	1–4	New Jersey Devils	Boucher	19,945	Flyers lead 3–2	L
6	May 24	1–2	@ New Jersey Devils	Boucher	19,040	Series tied 3–3	L
7	May 26	1–2	New Jersey Devils	Boucher	20,037	Devils win 4–3	L

Legend: W Win L Loss

== Player statistics ==
=== Scoring ===
- Position abbreviations: C = Center; D = Defense; G = Goaltender; LW = Left wing; RW = Right wing
- † = Joined team via a transaction (e.g., trade, waivers, signing) during the season. Stats reflect time with the Flyers only.
- ‡ = Left team via a transaction (e.g., trade, waivers, release) during the season. Stats reflect time with the Flyers only.

No.	Player	Pos	Regular season						Playoffs					
No.	Player	Pos	GP	G	A	Pts	+/-	PIM	GP	G	A	Pts	+/-	PIM
8	Mark Recchi	RW	82	28	63	91	20	50	18	6	12	18	3	6
10	John LeClair	LW	82	40	37	77	8	36	18	6	7	13	3	6
88	Eric Lindros	C	55	27	32	59	11	83	2	1	0	1	0	0
37	Eric Desjardins	D	81	14	41	55	20	32	18	2	10	12	1	2
18	Daymond Langkow	C	82	18	32	50	1	56	16	5	5	10	2	23
12	Simon Gagne	LW	80	20	28	48	11	22	17	5	5	10	0	2
26	Valeri Zelepukin	LW	77	11	21	32	−3	55	18	1	2	3	3	12
19	Mikael Renberg‡	RW	62	8	21	29	−1	30	—	—	—	—	—	—
20	Keith Jones	RW	57	9	16	25	8	82	18	3	3	6	−1	14
3	Dan McGillis	D	68	4	14	18	16	55	18	2	6	8	−1	12
25	Keith Primeau†	C	23	7	10	17	10	31	18	2	11	13	−4	13
11	Jody Hull†	RW	67	10	3	13	8	4	18	0	1	1	−4	0
6	Chris Therien	D	80	4	9	13	11	66	18	0	1	1	−1	12
32	Craig Berube	LW	77	4	8	12	3	162	18	1	0	1	−4	23
21	Sandy McCarthy‡	RW	58	6	5	11	−5	111	—	—	—	—	—	—
17	Rod Brind'Amour‡	C	12	5	3	8	−1	4	—	—	—	—	—	—
43	Andy Delmore	D	27	2	5	7	−1	8	18	5	2	7	0	14
22	Luke Richardson	D	74	2	5	7	14	140	18	0	1	1	−5	41
2	Adam Burt	D	67	1	6	7	−2	45	11	0	1	1	4	4
92	Rick Tocchet†	RW	16	3	3	6	4	23	18	5	6	11	−2	49
15	Peter White	C	21	1	5	6	1	6	16	0	2	2	−1	0
9	Mark Greig	RW	11	3	2	5	0	6	3	0	0	0	−1	0
14	Mikael Andersson‡	LW	36	2	3	5	−2	0	—	—	—	—	—	—
29	Gino Odjick†	LW	13	3	1	4	2	10	—	—	—	—	—	—
28	Marc Bureau‡	C	54	2	2	4	−1	10	—	—	—	—	—	—
55	Ulf Samuelsson†	D	49	1	2	3	8	58	—	—	—	—	—	—
28	Kent Manderville†	C	13	0	3	3	2	4	18	0	1	1	−3	22
44	Mark Eaton	D	27	1	1	2	1	8	7	0	0	0	−2	0
24	Zarley Zalapski†	D	12	0	2	2	0	6	—	—	—	—	—	—
23 (Note: White wore number 15 in his first two games with the Flyers.)	Todd White†	C	3	1	0	1	−1	0	—	—	—	—	—	—
33	Brian Boucher	G	35	0	1	1		4	18	0	0	0		0
24	Karl Dykhuis‡	D	5	0	1	1	−2	6	—	—	—	—	—	—
34	John Vanbiesbrouck	G	50	0	1	1		6	—	—	—	—	—	—
39	Jeff Lank	D	2	0	0	0	0	2	—	—	—	—	—	—
14	Mike Maneluk	RW	1	0	0	0	0	4	—	—	—	—	—	—
38	Steve Washburn†	C	1	0	0	0	0	4	—	—	—	—	—	—

=== Goaltending ===
No.	Player	Regular season											Playoffs									
No.	Player	GP	GS	W	L	T	SA	GA	GAA	SV%	SO	TOI	GP	GS	W	L	SA	GA	GAA	SV%	SO	TOI
34	John Vanbiesbrouck	50	49	25	15	9	1143	108	2.20	.906	3	2,950	—	—	—	—	—	—	—	—	—	—
33	Brian Boucher	35	33	20	10	3	790	65	1.91	.918	4	2,038	18	18	11	7	484	40	2.03	.917	1	1,183

== Awards and records ==
=== Awards ===
Type	Award/honor	Recipient	Ref
League (annual)	NHL All-Rookie Team	Brian Boucher (Goaltender)	
League (annual)	NHL All-Rookie Team	Simon Gagne (Forward)	
League (annual)	NHL second All-Star team	Eric Desjardins (Defense)	
League (in-season)	NHL All-Star Game selection	Eric Desjardins	
League (in-season)	NHL All-Star Game selection	John LeClair	
League (in-season)	NHL All-Star Game selection	Eric Lindros	
League (in-season)	NHL All-Star Game selection	Roger Neilson (coach)	
League (in-season)	NHL All-Star Game selection	Mark Recchi	
League (in-season)	NHL Player of the Week	John Vanbiesbrouck (October 25)	
League (in-season)	NHL Rookie of the Month	Simon Gagne (December)	
Team	Barry Ashbee Trophy	Eric Desjardins	
Team	Bobby Clarke Trophy	Mark Recchi	
Team	Pelle Lindbergh Memorial Trophy	Luke Richardson	
Team	Yanick Dupre Memorial Class Guy Award	Keith Jones	

=== Records ===
Among the team records set during the 1999–2000 season was goaltender John Vanbiesbrouck setting the team record for consecutive shutouts (3) from October 20 to October 24, which was later tied by Ilya Bryzgalov during the 2011–12 season. Eric Desjardins tied the team season record for powerplay goals by a defenseman (8) and the team set a franchise record for fewest overtime losses (3), a mark that was matched in the following two seasons.

During the third period of game two of their conference semifinals playoff series with the Pittsburgh Penguins, Rick Tocchet set team playoff records for most penalties (5) and penalty minutes (29) in a single period, while the team’s 92 penalty minutes is also a franchise high. The Flyers game four victory in the fifth overtime period is the longest in team history (152 minutes and seven seconds) and also holds the team record for most shots on goal during playoff overtime (43). In game five, Andy Delmore’s hat trick tied an NHL record for most goals by a defenseman in a playoff game while Mark Recchi tied the team record for most assists in a playoff game (4). The Flyers five-game road winning streak from May 2 to May 20 tied a franchise playoff record. Delmore’s five goals during the playoffs is the most by a Flyers defenseman.

=== Milestones ===
Milestone	Player	Date	Ref
First game	Mark Eaton	October 2, 1999	
First game	Simon Gagne	October 2, 1999	
First game	Brian Boucher	October 14, 1999	
First game	Jeff Lank	January 29, 2000	

== Transactions ==
The Flyers were involved in the following transactions from June 20, 1999, the day after the deciding game of the 1999 Stanley Cup Final, through June 10, 2000, the day of the deciding game of the 2000 Stanley Cup Final.

=== Trades ===
Date	Details		Ref
September 27, 1999	To Philadelphia Flyers: Matt Henderson	To Nashville Predators: Paul Healey	
October 15, 1999	To Philadelphia Flyers: Jody Hull	To Atlanta Thrashers: Future considerations	
October 20, 1999	To Philadelphia Flyers: Future considerations	To Montreal Canadiens: Karl Dykhuis	
November 16, 1999	To Philadelphia Flyers: Steve Washburn	To Nashville Predators: Conditional 7th-round draft pick in 2001 (Note: Condition not met.)	
November 30, 1999	To Philadelphia Flyers: Loan of Rastislav Pavlikovsky (Note: Pavlikovsky was reassigned by Ottawa on January 27, 2000.)	To Ottawa Senators	
December 9, 1999	To Philadelphia Flyers: Eric Bertrand	To Atlanta Thrashers: Brian Wesenberg	
January 23, 2000	To Philadelphia Flyers: Keith Primeau; 5th-round pick in 2000	To Carolina Hurricanes: Rod Brind'Amour; Jean-Marc Pelletier; 2nd-round pick in 2000	
January 26, 2000	To Philadelphia Flyers: Todd White	To Chicago Blackhawks: Conditional draft pick in 2001	
February 14, 2000	To Philadelphia Flyers: Future considerations	To Nashville Predators: Eric Bertrand	
February 15, 2000	To Philadelphia Flyers: Gino Odjick	To New York Islanders: Mikael Andersson; Carolina's 5th-round pick in 2000	
March 6, 2000	To Philadelphia Flyers: Travis Brigley; 6th-round pick in 2001	To Calgary Flames: Marc Bureau (Note: The Flyers also agreed to pay part of Bureau’s remaining salary.)	
March 8, 2000	To Philadelphia Flyers: Rick Tocchet	To Phoenix Coyotes: Mikael Renberg	
March 14, 2000	To Philadelphia Flyers: Kent Manderville	To Carolina Hurricanes: Sandy McCarthy	
March 14, 2000	To Philadelphia Flyers: Kirby Law	To Atlanta Thrashers: Vancouver's 6th-round pick in 2000; 6th-round pick in 2001	
March 16, 2000	To Philadelphia Flyers	To Utah Grizzlies (IHL): Loan of Zarley Zalapski	
May 31, 2000	To Philadelphia Flyers: Paul Ranheim	To Carolina Hurricanes: 8th-round pick in 2002	

=== Players acquired ===
Date	Player	Former team	Term	Via	Ref
July 13, 1999	Dean Melanson	Buffalo Sabres	1-year	Free agency	
July 13, 1999	Jeff Tory	Houston Aeros (IHL)	1-year	Free agency	
July 14, 1999	Chris Albert	Michigan K-Wings (IHL)	1-year	Free agency	
August 2, 1999	Mike Maneluk	New York Rangers	1-year	Free agency	
August 3, 1999	Ruslan Fedotenko	Sioux City Musketeers (USHL)		Free agency	
October 19, 1999	Ulf Samuelsson	Atlanta Thrashers	2-year	Free agency	
February 13, 2000	Zarley Zalapski	Utah Grizzlies (IHL)	1-year (Note: Club option for second year)	Free agency	
June 6, 2000	Dan Peters	Colorado College (WCHA)		Free agency	

=== Players lost ===
Date	Player	New team	Via (Note: In parentheses is the player's free agency group on July 1 if applicable.)	Ref
June 25, 1999	Jody Hull	Atlanta Thrashers	Expansion draft	
July 1, 1999	Dan Kordic (Note: Kordic retired.)		Contract expiration (UFA)	
July 29, 1999	Chris Joseph	Ottawa Senators	Free agency (UFA)	
August 4, 1999	Andre Payette	Mohawk Valley Prowlers (UHL)	Free agency (UFA)	
August 26, 1999	David MacIsaac	Los Angeles Kings	Free agency (VI)	
September 3, 1999	Steve Duchesne	Detroit Red Wings	Free agency (III)	
September 6, 1999	Ron Hextall		Retirement (Note: The final year of Hextall's contract was bought out.)	
September 20, 1999	Dennis Bonvie	Pittsburgh Penguins	Free agency (VI)	
September 22, 1999	Richard Park	Utah Grizzlies (IHL)	Free agency (II)	
December 4, 1999	Martin Cerven	Trenton Titans (ECHL) (Note: Cerven played the remainder of season in the ECHL with Trenton and the Charlotte Checkers.)	Buyout	
December 4, 1999	Roman Vopat	Essen Mosquitoes (DEL) (Note: Vopat signed with Essen on December 19, 1999.)	Buyout	
December 4, 1999	Jason Zent (Note: Zent retired.)		Buyout	

=== Signings ===
Date	Player	Term	Contract type	Ref
June 30, 1999	Eric Lindros	1-year	Re-signing	
July 13, 1999	Neil Little	1-year	Re-signing	
July 19, 1999	Keith Jones	3-year	Re-signing	
July 29, 1999	Sandy McCarthy	1-year	Re-signing	
July 29, 1999	Mikael Renberg	1-year	Re-signing	
August 3, 1999	Sean O'Brien	1-year	Re-signing	
August 5, 1999	Dan McGillis	2-year	Re-signing	
August 18, 1999	Karl Dykhuis	3-year	Re-signing	
August 20, 1999	Simon Gagne	3-year	Entry-level	
September 3, 1999	Daymond Langkow	2-year	Re-signing	
September 6, 1999	Craig Berube	1-year	Re-signing	
September 6, 1999	Valeri Zelepukin	1-year	Re-signing	
January 23, 2000	Keith Primeau	5-year	Re-signing	
June 6, 2000	Petr Hubacek		Entry-level	
June 6, 2000	Vaclav Pletka		Entry-level	

== Draft picks ==
Philadelphia's picks at the 1999 NHL entry draft, which was held at the FleetCenter in Boston on June 26, 1999. The Flyers traded their second-round pick, 58th overall, the New York Islanders' 2000 sixth-round pick, and Dainius Zubrus to the Montreal Canadiens for Mark Recchi on March 10, 1999. They also traded their fifth-round pick, 148th overall, and Colin Forbes to the Tampa Bay Lightning for Mikael Andersson and Sandy McCarthy on March 20, 1999, their eighth-round pick, 237th overall, to the Carolina Hurricanes for the rights to Francis Lessard on May 25, 1999, and their ninth-round pick, 265th overall, to the Dallas Stars for the Stars' 1998 ninth-round pick on June 27, 1998. The St. Louis Blues received the Flyers' sixth-round pick, 180th overall, as compensation for the Flyers hiring Roger Neilson as their head coach.

Round	Pick	Player	Position	Nationality	Team (league)	Notes
1	22	Maxime Ouellet	Goaltender	Canada	Quebec Remparts (QMJHL)	
4	119	Jeff Feniak	Defense	Canada	Calgary Hitmen (WHL)	
6	160	Konstantin Rudenko	Forward	Russia	Severstal Cherepovets (RUS)	(Note: The Flyers traded Pat Kavanagh to the Vancouver Canucks for the Canucks' sixth-round pick, 160th overall, on June 1, 1999.)
7	200	Pavel Kasparik	Center	Czech Republic	IHC Pisek (CZE)	(Note: The Flyers traded Johan Hedberg to the San Jose Sharks for the Sharks' seventh-round pick, 200th overall, on August 6, 1998.)
7	208	Vaclav Pletka	Left wing	Czech Republic	Ocelari Trinec (CZE)	
8	224	David Nystrom	Right wing	Sweden	Frolunda HC (Elitserien)	(Note: The Flyers traded their third-round pick, 90th overall, to the Calgary Flames for the rights to Ryan Bast and the Flames' eighth-round pick, 224th overall, on October 13, 1998.)

== Farm teams ==
The Flyers were affiliated with the Philadelphia Phantoms of the AHL and the Trenton Titans of the ECHL.
