= Denny Lambert =

Canadian ice hockey player

- Born: January 7, 1970 (age 56) Wawa, Ontario, Canada
- Height: 5 ft 11 in (180 cm)
- Weight: 200 lb (91 kg; 14 st 4 lb)
- Position: Left wing
- Shot: Left
- Played for: Mighty Ducks of Anaheim; Ottawa Senators; Nashville Predators; Atlanta Thrashers
- NHL draft: Undrafted
- Playing career: 1991–2003

Denny Lambert (born January 7, 1970) is a former professional Canadian ice hockey player and member of the Batchewana First Nation.

== Playing career ==
Lambert was drafted in the Ontario Hockey League where he played for the Sault Ste. Marie Greyhounds for three years. He then played 2 seasons in the International Hockey League with the San Diego Gulls before signing as a free agent with the Mighty Ducks of Anaheim of the National Hockey League. He then signed as a free agent with the Ottawa Senators in July 1996, and went on to play for the Nashville Predators (1998–1999) and the Atlanta Thrashers. He rejoined the Mighty Ducks of Anaheim (2001–2002) for his final NHL season before finishing off his career in the American Hockey League with the Milwaukee Admirals.

Throughout his NHL career, Lambert's primary role was that of an enforcer. The left winger played in 487 regular season NHL games, scoring 27 goals and 66 assists for 93 points, while racking up 1,391 penalty minutes.

== Career statistics ==
Bold indicates led league

=== Regular season and playoffs ===
			Regular season					Playoffs
Season	Team	League	GP	G	A	Pts	PIM	GP	G	A	Pts	PIM
1988–89	Sault Ste. Marie Greyhounds	OHL	61	14	15	29	203	—	—	—	—	—
1989–90	Sault Ste Marie Greyhounds	OHL	61	23	29	52	276	—	—	—	—	—
1990–91	Sault Ste. Marie Greyhounds	OHL	59	28	39	67	169	14	7	9	16	48
1991–92	San Diego Gulls	IHL	71	17	14	31	229	3	0	0	0	10
1992–93	St. Thomas Wildcats	CoHL	5	2	6	8	9	—	—	—	—	—
1992–93	San Diego Gulls	IHL	56	18	12	30	277	14	1	1	2	44
1993–94	San Diego Gulls	IHL	79	13	14	27	314	6	1	0	1	45
1994–95	San Diego Gulls	IHL	75	25	35	60	222	—	—	—	—	—
1994–95	Mighty Ducks of Anaheim	NHL	13	1	3	4	4	—	—	—	—	—
1995–96	Baltimore Bandits	AHL	44	14	28	42	126	12	3	9	12	39
1995–96	Mighty Ducks of Anaheim	NHL	33	0	8	8	55	—	—	—	—	—
1996–97	Ottawa Senators	NHL	80	4	16	20	217	6	0	1	1	9
1997–98	Ottawa Senators	NHL	72	9	10	19	250	11	0	0	0	19
1998–99	Nashville Predators	NHL	76	5	11	16	218	—	—	—	—	—
1999–00	Atlanta Thrashers	NHL	73	5	6	11	219	—	—	—	—	—
2000–01	Atlanta Thrashers	NHL	67	1	7	8	215	—	—	—	—	—
2001–02	Mighty Ducks of Anaheim	NHL	73	2	5	7	213	—	—	—	—	—
2002–03	Milwaukee Admirals	AHL	39	12	12	24	132	6	2	2	4	42
NHL totals			487	27	66	93	1391	17	0	1	1	18
IHL totals			281	73	75	148	1042	23	2	1	3	99

== Coaching career ==
Lambert became the assistant coach of the Sault Ste. Marie Greyhounds in the 2004–05 season, and remained in that position with the club until the summer of 2008, when Greyhounds head coach Craig Hartsburg left the team to become the head coach of the Ottawa Senators. The Greyhounds then promoted Lambert to the head coaching position.

In his first season as head coach, Sault Ste. Marie failed to qualify for the post-season, as the young, rebuilding club finished with their fewest point total since the 1994–95 season, and finished in last place in the OHL.

The Greyhounds rebounded in Lambert's second season with the team, with the help of assistant coach Mike Stapleton, as the club with an impressive record of 36–27–1–4 to finish with 77 points, and fifth place in the Western Conference. The Greyhounds faced the Plymouth Whalers in the conference quarter-finals, and lost the series in five games.

Lambert returned to Sault Ste. Marie for a third season in 2010–11, however, the team fell back into last place in the Western Conference, and on January 11, 2011, the Greyhounds relieved Lambert of his duties. Sault Ste. Marie had a record of 14–21–5–0 at the time of his firing.

Lambert went on to be a First Nations Police Officer with the Anishinabek Police Service. He graduated from the Ontario Police College in November 2012. He was hired as an associate coach by the Gatineau Olympiques of the QMJHL in 2016.

=== Coaching record ===
Team	Year	Regular season							Postseason
Team	Year	G	W	L	OTL	SL	Pts	Finish	Result
SOO	2008–09	68	19	45	2	2	42	5th in West	Missed playoffs
SOO	2009–10	68	36	27	1	4	77	3rd in West	Lost in First round
SOO	2010–11	40	14	21	5	0	33	5th in West	Replaced mid-season
