= Bryan Adams (ice hockey) =

Canadian professional ice hockey winger (born 1977)

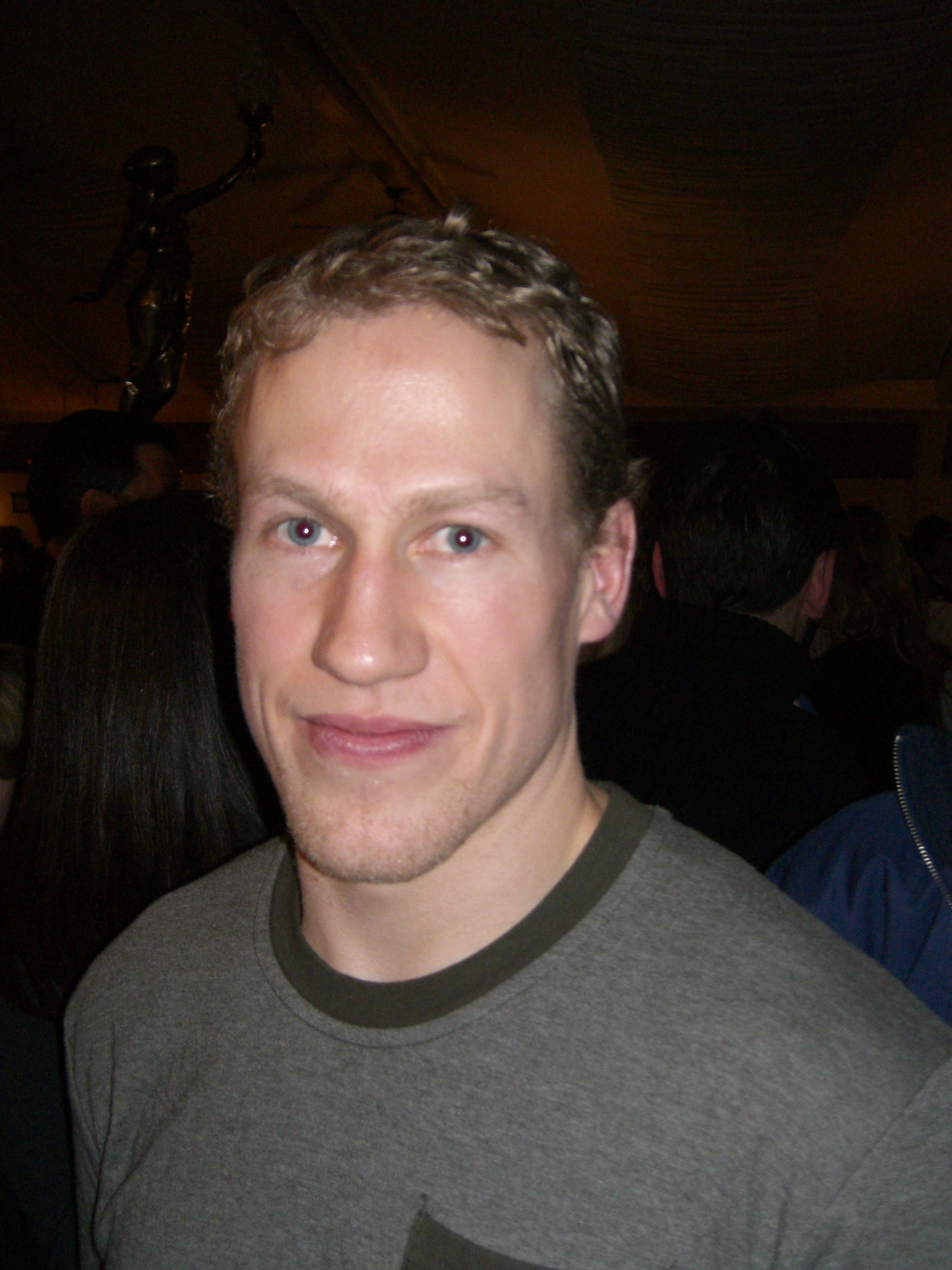
- Born: March 20, 1977 (age 47); Fort St. James, British Columbia, Canada
- Height: 6 ft 0 in (183 cm)
- Weight: 190 lb (86 kg; 13 st 8 lb)
- Position: Left wing
- Shot: Left
- Played for: Atlanta Thrashers; Iserlohn Roosters; Kölner Haie; EHC München
- NHL draft: Undrafted
- Playing career: 1999–2013

Bryan William Adams (born March 20, 1977) is a Canadian former professional ice hockey winger who last played with EHC München of the Deutsche Eishockey Liga in Germany.

== Playing career ==
Adams played a total of eleven games in the National Hockey League for the Atlanta Thrashers over two seasons (1999–2000 and 2000–01) scoring no goals, one assist, one point, and recording two penalty minutes.

He has found greater success in the DEL than the NHL. He joined the Iserlohn Roosters in 2003 and scored 39 goals and added 52 assists for 91 points in 131 games. He later joined Kölner Haie in 2006 where he scored just 9 goals in 50 games, but made 24 assists for 33 points. In 2010, he joined newly-promoted EHC München and stayed for three seasons before retiring.

== Career statistics ==
			Regular season					Playoffs
Season	Team	League	GP	G	A	Pts	PIM	GP	G	A	Pts	PIM
1995–96	Michigan State University	CCHA	42	3	8	11	12	—	—	—	—	—
1996–97	Michigan State University	CCHA	29	7	7	14	51	—	—	—	—	—
1997–98	Michigan State University	CCHA	31	9	21	30	39	—	—	—	—	—
1998–99	Michigan State University	CCHA	42	21	16	37	56	—	—	—	—	—
1999–00	Orlando Solar Bears	IHL	64	16	18	34	27	4	0	1	1	6
1999–00	Atlanta Thrashers	NHL	2	0	0	0	0	—	—	—	—	—
2000–01	Orlando Solar Bears	IHL	61	18	28	46	43	16	3	4	7	20
2000–01	Atlanta Thrashers	NHL	9	0	1	1	2	—	—	—	—	—
2001–02	Chicago Wolves	AHL	64	10	17	27	25	5	0	0	0	2
2002–03	Grand Rapids Griffins	AHL	74	8	17	25	37	13	2	0	2	4
2003–04	Iserlohn Roosters	DEL	44	15	15	30	107	—	—	—	—	—
2004–05	Iserlohn Roosters	DEL	39	11	15	26	64	—	—	—	—	—
2005–06	Iserlohn Roosters	DEL	48	13	22	35	80	—	—	—	—	—
2006–07	Kölner Haie	DEL	50	9	24	33	80	7	2	1	3	6
2007–08	Kölner Haie	DEL	54	10	19	29	86	14	1	1	2	8
2008–09	Kölner Haie	DEL	49	11	8	19	40	—	—	—	—	—
2009–10	Kölner Haie	DEL	55	12	10	22	73	3	2	1	3	8
2010–11	EHC München	DEL	52	8	12	20	20	1	0	0	0	0
2011–12	EHC München	DEL	21	2	4	6	8	—	—	—	—	—
2012–13	EHC München	DEL	51	6	10	16	22	—	—	—	—	—
NHL totals			11	0	1	1	2	—	—	—	—	—

Awards and achievements
Preceded by Steve Noble	Terry Flanagan Memorial Award; 1997–98	Succeeded by Ernie Hartlieb
