= Per Svartvadet =

Swedish ice hockey player

- Born: 17 May 1975 (age 50) Sollefteå, Sweden
- Height: 6 ft 2 in (188 cm)
- Weight: 214 lb (97 kg; 15 st 4 lb)
- Position: Centre
- Shot: Left
- Played for: Modo Hockey; Atlanta Thrashers
- NHL draft: 139th overall, 1993; Dallas Stars
- Playing career: 1993–2011

Per Eric Svartvadet (born 17 May 1975) is a Swedish former professional ice hockey player.

Svartvadet was drafted by the Dallas Stars in the 1993 NHL entry draft in the 6th round, as the 139th pick overall. In the summer of 1999 he was traded to the Atlanta Thrashers. He made his debut for the Thrashers in the 1999–2000 season, and also spent time with the Orlando Solar Bears that season. He spent four seasons in North America, before returning home to his native Sweden to play for Modo Hockey in 2003. The team won the Swedish championship in 2007, and this season Svartvadet was also given the Guldpucken, as the Most Valuable Player in the league.

== Career statistics ==
=== Regular season and playoffs ===
			Regular season					Playoffs
Season	Team	League	GP	G	A	Pts	PIM	GP	G	A	Pts	PIM
1990–91	Sollefteå HK	SWE.2	5	1	0	1	0	—	—	—	—	—
1991–92	Modo Hockey	SWE U20	30	17	19	36	36	—	—	—	—	—
1992–93	Modo Hockey	SWE U20	14	5	10	15	18	—	—	—	—	—
1992–93	Modo Hockey	SEL	2	0	0	0	0	—	—	—	—	—
1993–94	Modo Hockey	SWE U20	12	7	12	19	6	—	—	—	—	—
1993–94	Modo Hockey	SEL	36	2	1	3	4	11	0	0	0	6
1994–95	Modo Hockey	SEL	40	6	9	15	31	—	—	—	—	—
1995–96	Modo Hockey	SEL	40	9	14	23	26	8	2	3	5	0
1996–97	Modo Hockey	SEL	50	7	18	25	38	—	—	—	—	—
1997–98	Modo Hockey	SEL	46	6	12	18	28	7	3	2	5	2
1998–99	Modo Hockey	SEL	50	9	23	32	30	13	3	6	9	6
1999–2000	Atlanta Thrashers	NHL	38	3	4	7	6	—	—	—	—	—
1999–2000	Orlando Solar Bears	IHL	27	4	6	10	10	5	0	1	1	0
2000–01	Atlanta Thrashers	NHL	69	10	11	21	20	—	—	—	—	—
2001–02	Atlanta Thrashers	NHL	78	3	12	15	24	—	—	—	—	—
2002–03	Atlanta Thrashers	NHL	62	1	7	8	8	—	—	—	—	—
2002–03	Chicago Wolves	AHL	3	0	0	0	2	—	—	—	—	—
2003–04	Modo Hockey	SEL	35	13	7	20	10	—	—	—	—	—
2004–05	Modo Hockey	SEL	49	8	21	29	56	5	1	0	1	6
2005–06	Modo Hockey	SEL	46	13	13	26	26	5	0	1	1	0
2006–07	Modo Hockey	SEL	52	13	22	35	30	20	8	10	18	35
2007–08	Modo Hockey	SEL	54	8	26	34	34	5	1	1	2	4
2008–09	Modo Hockey	SEL	55	11	18	29	51	—	—	—	—	—
2009–10	Modo Hockey	SEL	55	11	18	29	32	—	—	—	—	—
2010–11	Modo Hockey	SEL	54	6	14	20	20	—	—	—	—	—
SEL totals			664	122	216	338	416	74	18	23	41	59
NHL totals			247	17	34	51	58	—	—	—	—	—

=== International ===
Year	Team	Event	GP	G	A	Pts	PIM
1993	Sweden	EJC	6	2	6	8	4
1994	Sweden	WJC	7	0	3	3	8
1995	Sweden	WJC	7	2	6	8	2
1997	Sweden	WC	10	0	2	2	0
Junior totals			20	4	15	19	14
Senior totals			10	0	2	2	0

Awards and achievements
Preceded by Kenny Jönsson	Golden Puck; 2007	Succeeded by Stefan Liv
