= Eric Nickulas =

American ice hockey player

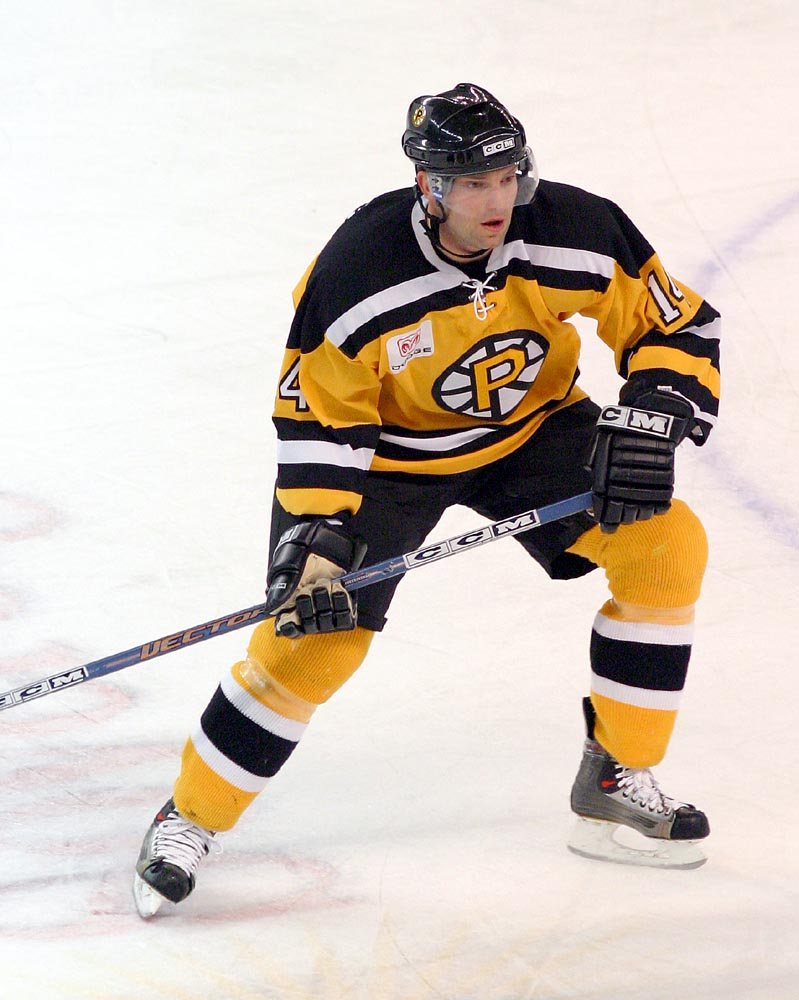
- Nickulas with the Providence Bruins in 2005
- Born: March 25, 1975 (age 51) Hyannis, Massachusetts, U.S.
- Height: 6 ft 1 in (185 cm)
- Weight: 195 lb (88 kg; 13 st 13 lb)
- Position: Right wing
- Shot: Right
- Played for: Boston Bruins; St. Louis Blues; Chicago Blackhawks; Hannover Scorpions; ERC Ingolstadt
- NHL draft: 99th overall, 1994; Boston Bruins
- Playing career: 1997–2009

Eric Nickulas (born March 25, 1975) is an American former professional ice hockey right winger. He played in the National Hockey League for the Boston Bruins, St. Louis Blues, and Chicago Blackhawks between 1999 and 2006.

== Biography ==
Nickulas was born in Hyannis, Massachusetts. As a youth, he played in the 1989 Quebec International Pee-Wee Hockey Tournament with the New York Islanders minor ice hockey team.

Nickulas was drafted 99th overall by the Boston Bruins in the 1994 NHL entry draft. In three years with Boston, he played mostly for the Providence Bruins of the American Hockey League.

Nickulas scored his first NHL Goal on March 2, 2000, in Boston's 5-2 home loss Versus Montreal.

He also played for the St. Louis Blues and the Chicago Blackhawks before returning to Boston in 2005. In 2006. Nickulas moved to Germany, signing with the Hannover Scorpions. After two seasons with Hannover, he played for the ERC Ingolstadt of the Deutsche Eishockey Liga in Germany.

On September 12, 2025, Nickulas was arrested and charged by Barnstable Police with one count of electronic enticement of a child. He entered a plea of not guilty.

== Career statistics ==
=== Regular season and playoffs ===
			Regular season					Playoffs
Season	Team	League	GP	G	A	Pts	PIM	GP	G	A	Pts	PIM
1991–92	Barnstable High School	HS-MA	24	30	25	55	—	—	—	—	—	—
1992–93	Tabor Academy	HS-MA	28	25	25	50	—	—	—	—	—	—
1993–94	Cushing Academy	HS-MA	25	46	36	82	—	—	—	—	—	—
1994–95	University of New Hampshire	HE	33	15	9	24	32	—	—	—	—	—
1995–96	University of New Hampshire	HE	34	26	12	38	66	—	—	—	—	—
1996–97	University of New Hampshire	HE	39	29	22	51	80	—	—	—	—	—
1997–98	Orlando Solar Bears	IHL	76	22	9	31	77	6	0	0	0	10
1998–99	Boston Bruins	NHL	2	0	0	0	0	1	0	0	0	0
1998–99	Providence Bruins	AHL	75	31	27	58	83	18	8	12	20	33
1999–00	Boston Bruins	NHL	20	5	6	11	12	—	—	—	—	—
1999–00	Providence Bruins	AHL	40	6	6	12	37	12	2	3	5	20
2000–01	Boston Bruins	NHL	7	0	0	0	4	—	—	—	—	—
2000–01	Providence Bruins	AHL	62	20	23	43	100	12	4	4	8	24
2001–02	Worcester IceCats	AHL	54	11	25	36	48	3	0	1	1	2
2002–03	St. Louis Blues	NHL	8	0	1	1	6	—	—	—	—	—
2002–03	Worcester IceCats	AHL	39	17	16	33	40	3	0	0	0	2
2003–04	St. Louis Blues	NHL	44	7	11	18	44	—	—	—	—	—
2003–04	Chicago Blackhawks	NHL	21	1	1	2	8	—	—	—	—	—
2004–05	Norfolk Admirals	AHL	53	11	11	22	32	6	0	3	3	8
2005–06	Boston Bruins	NHL	16	2	4	6	8	—	—	—	—	—
2005–06	Providence Bruins	AHL	38	10	16	26	46	5	1	1	2	4
2006–07	Hannover Scorpions	DEL	48	13	17	30	129	4	2	0	2	6
2007–08	Hannover Scorpions	DEL	41	6	8	14	56	3	1	0	1	8
2008–09	ERC Ingolstadt	DEL	21	3	3	6	34	—	—	—	—	—
AHL totals			361	106	124	230	386	59	15	24	39	93
NHL totals			118	15	23	38	82	1	0	0	0	0
