= Geordie Kinnear =

Canadian ice hockey player and coach

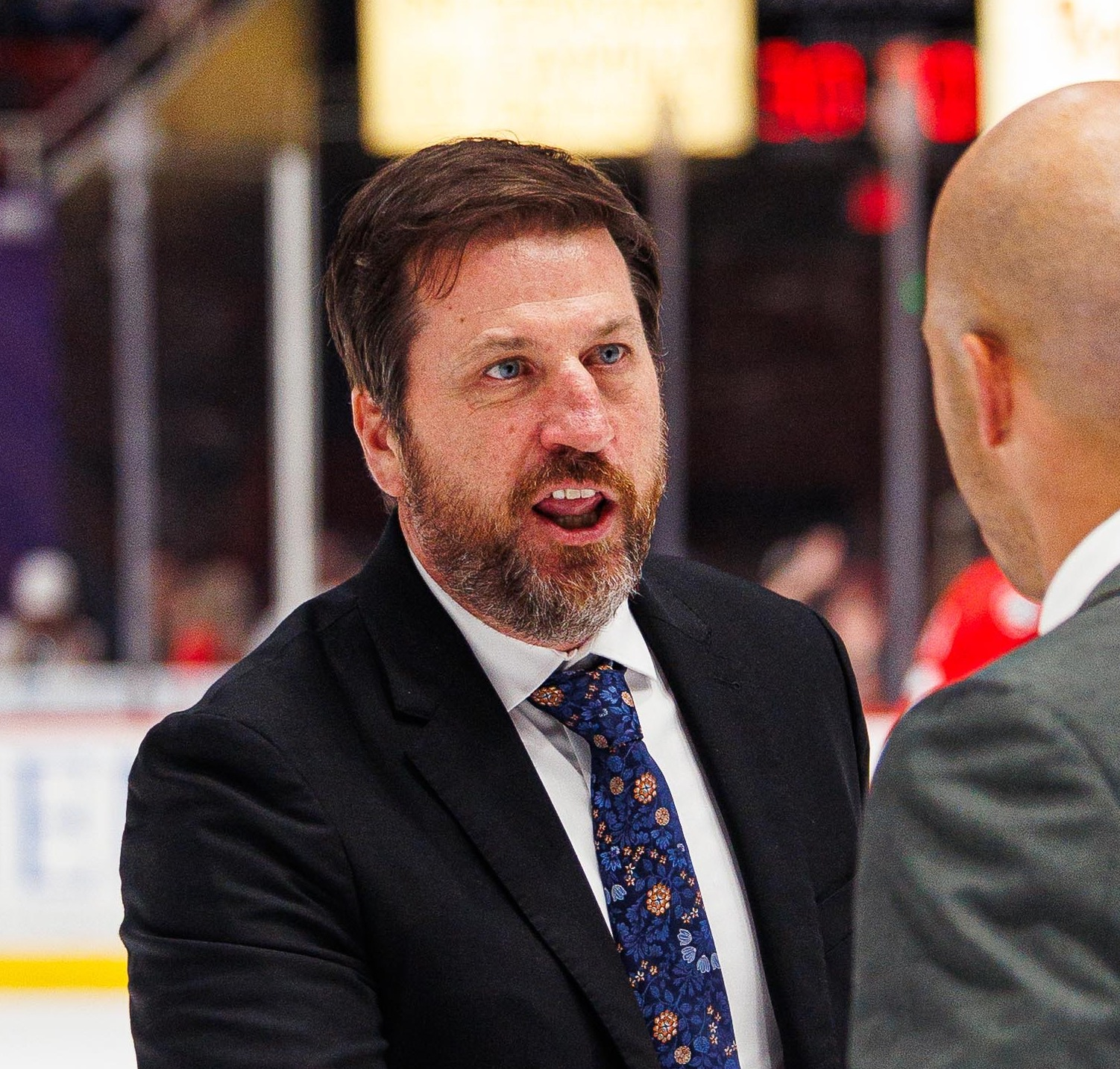
- Kinnear in 2025
- Born: July 9, 1973 (age 53) Simcoe, Ontario, Canada
- Height: 6 ft 1 in (185 cm)
- Weight: 194 lb (88 kg; 13 st 12 lb)
- Position: Defence
- Shot: Left
- Played for: Atlanta Thrashers
- NHL draft: 162nd overall, 1992; New Jersey Devils
- Playing career: 1993–2001

Geordie S. Kinnear (born July 9, 1973) is a Canadian former professional ice hockey defenceman and current head coach of the Charlotte Checkers of the American Hockey League (AHL). He played 4 games in the National Hockey League (NHL) with the Atlanta Thrashers in the 1999–00 season. The rest of his career, which lasted from 1993 to 2001, was mainly spent in the minor American Hockey League. After retiring he turned to coaching, and was named head coach of the Springfield Thunderbirds in 2016.

== Playing career ==
After playing three seasons of junior hockey for the Peterborough Petes of the Ontario Hockey League, Kinnear was drafted in the seventh round, 162nd overall, by the New Jersey Devils in the 1992 NHL entry draft. One of the team's original players, he skated with River Rats for the first six years of his eight-year professional career (1993–94 to 1998–99), helping them reach the playoffs every year. Over that time, he was a member of the River Rats' 1995 Calder Cup championship team, was selected to four consecutive AHL All-Star Classics (1995–1999) and served as Albany's captain for three seasons (1996–1999).

In August 1999, Kinnear made his National Hockey League debut after he signed with the Atlanta Thrashers as a free agent. He appeared in four games with Thrashers and played for the other part of the 1999-2000 season with Atlanta's IHL affiliate, the Orlando Solar Bears. After starting the 2000-01 season with Orlando, he was traded back to New Jersey on Nov. 6, 2000, and played 14 games with the Albany River Rats before being forced to retire due to injury in December 2000. He retired as the all-time leader in games played and penalty minutes for the River Rats and was one of the first inductees into the Albany River Rats Hall of Fame. He was honoured during a game versus Providence with a special "Geordie Kinnear Night" when his #4 sweater was retired and hoisted to the rafters.

== Coaching career ==
After an eight-year professional career, Kinnear began his coaching career when he joined the Albany River Rats coaching staff in August 2001. He worked for the New Jersey Devils' minor-league affiliate from 2001–2006, serving as Albany's assistant coach for four seasons and working as a special assignment scout with the New Jersey Devils during the 2004-05 season. He spent the 2006-07 season serving as a part-time assistant and special consultant for Albany during their first year as the Carolina Hurricanes top minor-league affiliate. During the Charlotte Checkers' 2015-2016 campaign, he spent his eighth full season working for the Carolina Hurricanes organization and his thirteenth season as an assistant coach in the American Hockey League (AHL).

Kinnear was hired by the Florida Panthers as head coach of their AHL affiliate, the Springfield Thunderbirds, for the 2016–17 season. This was Kinnear's first head coaching position. After four seasons as coach with the Thunderbirds, Kinnear returned to the Charlotte Checkers as head coach following an affiliation change with the Panthers for the 2020–21 season.

== Career statistics ==
			Regular season					Playoffs
Season	Team	League	GP	G	A	Pts	PIM	GP	G	A	Pts	PIM
1989–90	Norwich Merchants	NDJCHL	1	0	0	0	19	—	—	—	—	—
1989–90	Tillsonburg Titans	WOHL	34	2	5	7	153	—	—	—	—	—
1990–91	Peterborough Petes U18 AA	OHL Jr B	6	0	6	6	51	—	—	—	—	—
1991–92	Peterborough Petes	OHL	63	5	16	21	195	10	0	2	2	36
1992–93	Peterborough Petes	OHL	58	6	22	28	161	19	1	5	6	43
1993–94	Albany River Rats	AHL	59	3	12	15	197	5	0	0	0	21
1994–95	Albany River Rats	AHL	68	5	11	16	136	9	1	1	2	7
1995–96	Albany River Rats	AHL	73	4	7	11	170	4	0	1	1	2
1996–97	Albany River Rats	AHL	59	2	9	11	175	10	0	1	1	15
1997–98	Albany River Rats	AHL	78	1	15	16	206	13	1	1	2	68
1998–99	Albany River Rats	AHL	55	1	13	14	162	5	0	1	1	0
1999–00	Orlando Solar Bears	IHL	69	1	5	6	231	6	0	0	0	9
1999–00	Atlanta Thrashers	NHL	4	0	0	0	13	—	—	—	—	—
2000–01	Orlando Solar Bears	IHL	11	0	0	0	41	—	—	—	—	—
2000–01	Albany River Rats	AHL	14	1	1	2	48	—	—	—	—	—
AHL totals			406	17	68	85	1094	46	2	5	7	113
NHL totals			4	0	0	0	13	—	—	—	—	—
