= Jody Hull =

Canadian ice hockey player and coach

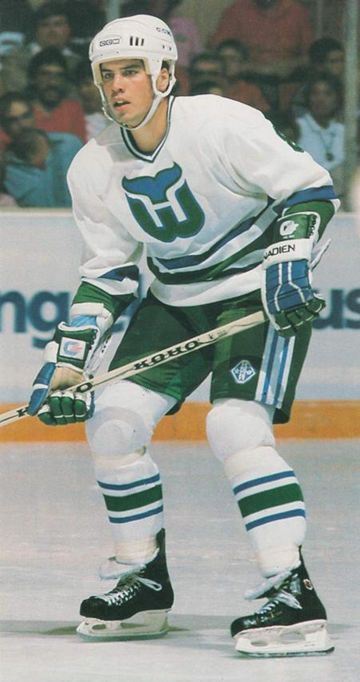
- Born: February 2, 1969 (age 57) Petrolia, Ontario, Canada
- Height: 6 ft 2 in (188 cm)
- Weight: 195 lb (88 kg; 13 st 13 lb)
- Position: Right wing
- Shot: Right
- Played for: Hartford Whalers; New York Rangers; Ottawa Senators; Florida Panthers; Tampa Bay Lightning; Philadelphia Flyers
- NHL draft: 18th overall, 1987; Hartford Whalers
- Playing career: 1988–2004

Jody Hull (born February 2, 1969) is a Canadian former professional ice hockey winger and current head coach of the Tri-City Americans of the Western Hockey League. He was selected by the Hartford Whalers of the National Hockey League in the first round, 18th overall, of the 1987 NHL entry draft. He also played professionally for the New York Rangers, Ottawa Senators, Florida Panthers, Tampa Bay Lightning, and Philadelphia Flyers. After retiring from playing he became a coach and rose to become the head coach of the Peterborough Petes of the Ontario Hockey League from December 2012 to January 2018. Hull was born in Petrolia, Ontario, but grew up in Cambridge, Ontario.

== Playing career ==
=== Amateur ===
Hull was selected by the Peterborough Petes of the Ontario Hockey League (OHL) in the first round, 14th overall, in the 1985 OHL midget priority selection draft from the Cambridge Winter Hawks of the Mid-Western Junior Hockey League. He made his Petes debut in the following 1985–86 season where in 61 games as a rookie, he scored 20 goals and 22 assists for 42 points. During the Christmas period, Hull joined Team Ontario to play in the Esso Cup, an under-17 tournament from across Canada. Peterborough finished first in the league during the regular season and advanced to the Leyden Division finals against the Belleville Bulls, a series which they lost. In 16 playoff games, Hull added one goal and six points. In his second season with the Petes in 1986–87, he was considered one of the team's top scoring threats. His season was limited by injuries to his groin and ankle. He scored 18 goals and 52 points in 49 games. The Petes made it the to the Leyden Division final for the second consecutive season, but lost to the Oshawa Generals. In 12 playoff games, he recorded four goals and 13 points. He returned for a third season in 1987–88 and tallied 50 goals and 94 points in 60 games. The Petes finished first in the Leyden Division in the regular season and went all the way to the OHL championship final where they were defeated by the Windsor Compuware Spitfires. In 12 playoff games he added ten goals and 18 points.

=== Professional ===
==== Hartford Whalers ====
Ahead of the National Hockey League (NHL)'s 1987 entry draft, Hull was rated as the ninth best prospect according to the NHL Central Scouting Bureau. He was selected in the first round, 18th overall, by the Hartford Whalers. He signed his first contract with the Whalers on April 1, 1988. During Hartford's 1988 training camp, Hull failed to impress early on but after being given a second chance by general manager (GM) Emile Francis and head coach Larry Pleau, improved enough to make the team for the 1988–89 season as an extra forward. He sat out the season opener, but made his NHL debut on October 8, going scoreless in a 6–2 loss to the Boston Bruins. Playing on a line with Ray Ferraro, Hull recorded his first NHL goal on October 12, the game winner on Bob Froese in a 4–3 victory over the New York Rangers. He also tallied his first point, an assist on Ferraro's first period goal in the same game. In November, he also saw time on the first line with Ron Francis and Kevin Dineen and third line with Dean Evason. He tallied three points in a 6–4 victory over the Montreal Canadiens on January 19, 1989, scoring once and assisting on goals by Ferraro and Dave Tippett. In 60 games in his rookie season, he scored 16 goals and 34 points. Hartford finished fourth in the Adams Division but qualified for the 1989 Stanley Cup playoffs and faced the Canadiens in the first round. Hull made his NHL playoff debut on April 5 in game one of the series but was injured and missed the remainder of the playoffs.

At his second training camp in 1989, the Whalers had overstocked themselves on NHL-quality right wingers after acquiring Pat Verbeek and new GM Ed Johnston wanted new coach Rick Ley to experiment with Hull on the left wing. However, he suffered a groin pull that kept him out for most of camp and the beginning of the 1989–90 season. He returned from the injury on October 11 in a game against the Washington Capitals and was placed on the top line alongside Francis and Verbeek, but was re-injured in the first period. He then suffered a charley horse and only returned on October 18 after missing five of the first six games of the season. On October 26, he recorded a three-point game, scoring twice and assisting on another by Paul MacDermid in a 7–3 win over the New Jersey Devils. In early November Hull was injured again, suffering a bruised left shoulder. He returned on November 10 after missing two games, playing on the left wing of Ferraro and Dineen. His play suffered and on November 27, he was assigned to Hartford's American Hockey League (AHL) affiliate, the Binghamton Whalers. He was recalled on December 21 and appeared in one game before being sent back to the AHL. In 21 games with Binghamton, he scored seven goals and 17 points. He was recalled again on January 31, 1990, but did not make an appearance until February 10. He missed some time at the beginning of March with a bruised shoulder again. In 38 games with Hartford, he tallied seven goals and 17 points. The Whalers finished fourth in the Adams Division, but seventh in the NHL overall, and faced the first place Bruins in the first round of the 1990 Stanley Cup playoffs. Hull was scratched for the first couple of playoff games, but was inserted into the lineup starting in game three of the series. He marked his first NHL playoff point in game four of the series on April 10, assisting on Yvon Corriveau's second period goal in a 6–5 loss to the Bruins. Ultimately, the Whalers were eliminated by the Bruins in seven games and Hull recorded the one point in the five games he appeared in.

==== New York Rangers ====
Hull, who had been rumoured to be dealt during the offseason, was traded to the New York Rangers on July 9 in exchange for centre Carey Wilson and a third-round draft pick in the 1991 NHL entry draft. Rangers' GM Neil Smith acknowledged that Hull was not the most physical of forwards, but that he had a good shot and was a fast skater. Hull signed a contract with his new team on September 4 and Hull made the Rangers' opening day roster for the 1990–91 season, but as an extra forward. He made his debut on October 6 in a 5–4 loss to his former team, the Whalers, but did not make it out of the second period after suffering a hand injury. He returned to the lineup on October 27 in a game against the Quebec Nordiques and tallied his first point with the team, assisting on Mark Janssens third period goal in a 4–1 win. He scored his first goal for the team in a 6–2 victory over the Buffalo Sabres on November 7. He suffered an injury to his foot in November that caused him to miss time. He suffered a third injury in March 1991, a bruised hip, that caused him to miss time. He finished the season with five goals and 13 points in 47 games. The Rangers qualified for the 1991 Stanley Cup playoffs, but Hull was a healthy scratch for the first round series loss to the Washington Capitals.

In the 1991 offseason, the league saw changes as the San Jose Sharks joined the NHL. In the resulting 1991 NHL expansion draft, Hull was among the players left exposed by the Rangers. However, teammates Kelly Kisio and Brian Mullen were acquired by the Sharks and Hull remained with the Rangers. He began the 1991–92 season with New York and appeared in three games going scoreless before he was assigned to the Rangers' AHL affiliate, the Binghamton Rangers, on October 13. He spent the remainder of the season in Binghamton and scored 34 goals and 65 points in 39 games. The AHL Rangers qualified for the 1992 Calder Cup playoffs and made it to the second round where they were knocked out by the Rochester Americans. Hull suffered a broken finger during the playoffs and the injury prevented New York from recalling him after Binghamton's elimination. In 11 playoff games, he recorded five goals and seven points.

==== Ottawa Senators ====
For the second consecutive season, the NHL expanded, adding the Ottawa Senators and Tampa Bay Lightning franchises. Hull was again among the players made available for selection by the Rangers in the 1992 NHL expansion draft. Each existing could only lose two players and the Rangers struck a secret deal with the Senators that would see the expansion team take goaltender Mark Laforest to protect half their roster in exchange for two young players they would later receive in another transaction, despite the league outlawing such deals. The Senators did take Laforest from the Rangers, but the Rangers reneged on the agreement, demanding another draft pick from Ottawa to complete the deal as promised. After more negotiations, the Rangers only agreed to send one player back to the Ottawa Senators. On July 27, Hull was traded to Ottawa for future considerations. Going into the team's opening night of the 1992–93 season, Hull practised on a line with Sylvain Turgeon and Neil Brady. In the team's first ever game on October 8, Hull assisted on the team's first ever goal by Brady on the power play. He added a second assist that night on Turgeon's power play goal as Ottawa won 5–3 over the Canadiens in the franchise's first ever victory. He scored his first goal with the team on October 12 in a 6–3 loss to the Bruins. By November, Brady had been switched out with Jamie Baker and the line was creating the majority of Ottawa's offence. In December he missed three games with a groin injury, returning on December 17. He suffered an ankle sprain on January 19, 1993, returning to the lineup on February 9. He finished the season with 13 goals and 34 points in 69 games as Ottawa finished out of the playoffs.

==== Florida Panthers ====
The league expanded again, adding the Anaheim Mighty Ducks and Florida Panthers franchises. In the 1993 NHL expansion draft, Hull was among the players Ottawa protected. However, he was a free agent from the Senators in the 1993 offseason, Hull declined the Senators offer and signed a two-way contract with the expansion Panthers in August 1993. Hull made his Panthers debut in a 5–3 loss to the St. Louis Blues on October 7. Placed on a line with Brian Skrudland and Mike Hough, he missed some time in October after injuring both of his ankles. He did not record his first point for the team until October 30, assisting on a goal by Dave Lowry in a 2–1 victory over the Lightning. He marked his first goal for the team on November 2 in a 4–3 loss to the Philadelphia Flyers. On March 4, 1994, Hull separated his shoulder in a loss to his former team, the Whalers. He returned to the lineup after missing six games on March 30 in a 2–1 loss to the Blues. He finished the 1993–94 season with 13 goals and 26 points in 69 games. His second season with Florida in 1994–95 was abbreviated on account of the lockout that postponed the start of the regular season until January 1995. When play resumed, Hull was back on a line with Skrudland and Hough. In 46 games, he scored 11 goals and 19 points as the Panthers missed the playoffs again.

A free agent at season's end, Hull received a qualifying offer from the Panthers in order for the team to retain his signing rights. Hull agreed to a new three-year contract with the team on July 19, 1995. Ahead of the 1995–96 season, head coach Roger Neilson was fired after not making the playoffs and Doug MacLean was hired as his replacement. MacLean intended to introduce youth to the lineup and split up the Hough-Skrudland-Hull line that had been so effective for the Panthers in their first two seasons, replacing Hough with Bill Lindsay. On October 24, he recorded a three-point game, scoring once and assisting on two goals by Skrudland in a 6–1 win over the Toronto Maple Leafs. He was leading the team in scoring to start the season when on October 28, he suffered a cracked rib in a game against his former team, the Ottawa Senators. He returned to the lineup on November 7 in a 4–2 victory over the Flyers. The Panthers, who had struggled to make the playoffs the previous two seasons, were atop the standings in December, with Hull among the team's leaders. By January 1996 the Hough-Skrudland-Hull line had been reformed. He finished the season having set career highs in goals (20), points (37), and appearances (78). The Panthers finished fourth in the Eastern Conference and faced the Bruins in the opening round of the 1996 Stanley Cup playoffs. On a line with Lindsay and Tom Fitzgerald, Hull recorded his first NHL playoff goal in game one of the series, a 6–3 victory. In game three, he scored twice to help the Panthers win their third consecutive playoff game. The Panthers ultimately eliminated the Bruins, and then did the same to the Flyers in the second round. Hull missed the series-deciding game six against Philadelphia with back spasms after being crosschecked by Eric Lindros. He struggled with the back spasms through the Eastern Conference finals against the Pittsburgh Penguins. The Panthers succeeded in making it to the 1996 Stanley Cup Final against the Colorado Avalanche and Hull was inserted into the lineup for game one after missing the series-winning game against the Penguins. However, after game two, MacLean opted to dress only 11 forwards, and Hull was scratched from the lineup. When MacLean went back to 12 forwards for game four, Hull remained out of the lineup. Ultimately, the Panthers fell to the Avalanche in four games, ending their season. In fourteen playoff games, Hull scored three goals and five points.

To start the 1996–97 season, Hull saw him squeezed out on the Panthers' right side, getting pushed down the depth chart by the arrivals of Ray Sheppard, Martin Straka (who as a centre forced the move of Fitzgerald to the wing to accommodate him), and Brad Smyth. This led to Hull being regularly being a healthy scratch from the lineup. He did not make his season debut until October 16 in a game against the Sharks, playing on a line with Lindsay and Radek Dvořák. He also played on a line with Stu Barnes, but his lack of playing time led to a decline in his production. After Johan Garpenlöv suffered an injury, a spot opened in the lineup and Hull began to see regular playing time again. Hull ended up on the fourth line with Dvořák and Chris Wells. By January 1997, his lack of production made him, among others, the target of criticism by MacLean. In 67 games, he scored ten goals and 16 points. The Panthers qualified for the 1997 Stanley Cup playoffs and faced the Rangers in the opening round. The Panthers were eliminated in five games and Hull went scoreless in the series.

With further offseason acquisitions putting more pressure on Hull to find a place in the lineup going into the 1997–98 season, trade rumours began to rise towards the end of training camp of a possible move. Further to his lack of a guaranteed spot in the lineup, head coach MacLean experimented with making Hull a defenceman due to a series of injuries that ravaged the team's defensive depth. However, the team's poor play led to MacLean's firing and he was replaced by Panthers GM Bryan Murray as the interim head coach in November. Hull, who had been a healthy scratch eight times under MacLean to start the season, was given a second chance by Murray, playing on a line with Kirk Muller and Dave Gagner. However, time ran out on the second chance in December when Murray scratched him for seven straight games. When he did get back in the lineup on a line with Lindsay and Fitzgerald, his playing time was short-lived as he suffered a broken wrist in his second game. In 21 games with Florida, he scored two goals.

==== Tampa Bay Lightning ====
On January 16, 1998, Hull, along with goaltender Mark Fitzpatrick, was traded to the Tampa Bay Lightning in exchange for winger Dino Ciccarelli and defenceman Jeff Norton. Hull, who was still recovering from his wrist injury when the trade was made, only made his debut for the Lightning on January 24 in a 5–2 loss to the Maple Leafs playing on the fourth line. He played in his 500th NHL game on January 26 in a 2–1 loss to the Senators. He suffered an ankle injury in his first match against the Panthers since the trade on January 31. He recorded his first goal and point for Tampa Bay on February 28 in a 5–2 victory over the Washington Capitals. Placed on a line with Stéphane Richer and Darcy Tucker, he recorded a three-point game on March 18, scoring once and assisting on two goals by Richer in a 4–2 victory over the Vancouver Canucks. However, the Lightning were the last-place team in the NHL and failed to make the playoffs. In 28 games, he scored two goals and six points. In the 1998 offseason, the NHL expanded again, adding the Nashville Predators franchise. Hull was left exposed by the Lightning in the 1998 NHL expansion draft but was not selected.

==== Philadelphia Flyers ====
Hull became a free agent on July 1 after turning down a contract with the team. He was invited to training camp in September on a professional tryout contract by the Flyers who were being managed by his former coach in Florida, Roger Neilson. He earned a spot on the team and was given a contract by the Flyers, signing on October 7, just before the opening of the 1998–99 season. He made his Flyers debut on opening night, October 9, in a 1–0 shutout win over the Rangers, playing on the penalty kill unit alongside Lindros. Placed on the fourth line with Mike Sillinger and Colin Forbes, Hull strained his groin in a game against the New York Islanders on October 31. He returned on November 7 and tallied his first point with the team on November 12, assisting on Petr Svoboda's goal in a 2–1 loss to the Panthers. He scored his first goal for Philadelphia on December 8 in a 5–5 tie with the Devils. On December 20 he suffered a concussion in a game against the Lightning. He briefly returned on December 26 but left the game with ongoing concussion symptoms and was only reactivated from the injured list on January 7, 1999. He went 24 games without a goal, ending his drought on March 14 in a 1–1 tie with the Dallas Stars. He finished the season with three goals and 14 points in 72 games. The Flyers made the 1999 Stanley Cup playoffs and faced the Maple Leafs in the first round. Hull was placed on a line with Marc Bureau and Keith Jones and was tasked with shutting down Toronto's top line. Ultimately, the Maple Leafs eliminated the Flyers and in six playoff games, Hull went scoreless.

In the 1999 offseason, the league expanded once more, adding the Atlanta Thrashers. Hull was left unprotected by the Flyers in the 1999 NHL expansion draft and was selected by Atlanta. However, Hull failed to make the team out of training camp and was exposed in the waiver draft. He was not selected and instead assigned to Atlanta's International Hockey League affiliate, the Orlando Solar Bears, to start the 1999–2000 season. He appeared in one game for the team, going scoreless, before being traded back to the Flyers for future considerations on October 15. Back on the Flyers' checking line alongside Bureau and Craig Berube, Hull was a key penalty killer for the team. However, in January 2000, Bureau was lost to injury and he was replaced by Simon Gagné. At the end of January, Hull suffered his own injury, a partial tear to his medial collateral ligament in his knee. He missed ten games, returning on February 22, back on his line with Bureau and Berube. In 67 games, he scored ten goals and 13 points. The Flyers ended the season atop the Atlantic Division and qualified for the 2000 Stanley Cup playoffs. In the playoffs, Hull was often assigned to the fourth line with Kent Manderville and Jones, with Berube occasionally subbing in. They advanced to the Eastern Conference finals against the Devils where they were eliminated. In 18 playoff games, Hull added one assist.

In the 2000 offseason the NHL expanded by two teams, the Columbus Blue Jackets and Minnesota Wild. Hull was once again left exposed in the 2000 NHL expansion draft, but was passed over this time. A free agent at season's end, Hull re-signed with the Flyers to a one-year deal on July 13. He opened the 2000–01 season on injured reserve with a shoulder injury, only returning to the lineup on October 24. By November he was playing on a line with Manderville and Paul Ranheim and in 71 games, he scored seven goals and 15 points. The Flyers qualified for the 2001 Stanley Cup playoffs and faced the Sabres in the first round. Buffalo knocked Philadelphia out of the playoffs in six games, culminating in an 8–0 loss on April 21. In the series, Hull went scoreless.

==== Return to Ottawa ====
A free agent in the offseason, Hull did not receive an invite to training camp from any team, but spent his time skating with the OHL's Peterborough Petes. He was signed by the Ottawa Senators on January 24, 2002 and was assigned to the Grand Rapids Griffins of the AHL to get into game shape before joining the NHL team for the 2001–02 season. In the three games with the Griffins, he scored two goals and three points. Hull was the first of a trio of acquisitions that gave the team more defensive strength and more veteran leadership. In 24 games with the Senators, he scored two goals and four points. The Senators made the 2002 Stanley Cup playoffs and advanced to the second round where they were eliminated by the Maple Leafs. In 12 playoff games, he scored one goal and two points. He did not receive an offer from the Senators and became a free agent at season's end. On August 21, he signed a one-year deal to remain with the Senators. He began the 2002–03 season on the team's fourth line with Shaun Van Allen and Toni Dahlman, tasked as the team's checking line. Hull was also one of Ottawa's key penalty killers. Later Dennis Bonvie was added to the roster and replaced Dahlman on the fourth line. Head coach Jacques Martin eventually began shuffling the lines more and Hull ended up as high as the third line with Van Allen and Martin Havlát. In 70 appearances, he tallied three goals and 11 points. The Senators finished atop the league, winning the President's Trophy and made the 2003 Stanley Cup playoffs, but Hull was a healthy scratch to start the playoffs for the Senators. He did not play in the first round and only an injury to Peter Schaefer gave him a spot in the lineup, marking his first game on April 25 in the second round series versus the Flyers. Hull made one more appearance before Schaefer's return bumped him from the lineup. Ultimately, the Senators advanced to the Eastern Conference final where they lost to the Devils. In the two games, Hull went scoreless.

Hull re-signed with the Senators in July 2003 to a one-year, two-way contract, but with the intention of him playing with the team's AHL affiliate, the Binghamton Senators, while learning to be a coach in transition to a career in his post playing days. He remained with Ottawa to start the campaign due to Havlát sitting out while awaiting a new contract, getting into a single game. However, when Havlát signed, Hull was the odd man out and was assigned to Binghamton, where he spent the remainder of the 2003–04 season. In 32 games with Binghamton, he scored one goal and ten points. In addition to the Senators, Hull also played for the Whalers, Rangers, Panthers, Lightning, and the Flyers between 1988 and 2004. He played 831 regular season games in total, scoring 124 goals and 137 assists for 261 points. He also played 69 playoff games, scoring four goals and nine points.

== International play ==
Medal record

Men's ice hockey

Representing Canada

World Junior Championships
Gold medal – first place	1988 Soviet Union	

He was invited to the Team Canada junior team training camp in June 1986. He did not make the team, which turned out to be to his benefit, as it was suspended after brawling with the Soviet Union at the 1987 World Junior Ice Hockey Championships. He was selected for the 1988 Team Canada iteration, and was considered among the main scoring threats for the team entering the tournament. He played on the team's top line alongside Theoren Fleury and Dan Currie, he put up two goals and three points in seven games as Canada won gold.

== Coaching career ==
=== Peterborough Petes ===
After he retired from playing in 2004, Hull joined the Peterborough Petes as an assistant coach under head coach Dick Todd in 2005. He won the J. Ross Robertson Cup with the Petes in 2006 as an assistant. He left the team in 2008. He rejoined the Petes as an assistant in 2010 under Mike Pelino before taking over as head coach in 2012 after Pelino was fired. Despite the team trading away its captain, Slater Koekkoek, at the trade deadline, Hull guided the team to a record of 18 wins, 12 losses and 3 overtime losses (18–12–0–3) to finish the 2012–13 season out of the playoffs by a point. The team's strong finish lifted the interim tag and he signed a two-year contract with the Petes. In his first full season in 2013–14, the team went 32–30–0–6 and qualified for the playoffs. The Petes beat the Kingston Frontenacs in the opening round before falling to the Oshawa Generals in the second. On July 3, it was announced that Hull had signed a three-year extension with the Petes. In the offseason, Hull was named the head coach of Canada's Under-18 team for the 2014 Ivan Hlinka Memorial Tournament. Led by Mitch Marner and Lawson Crouse the team won gold, going undefeated in the tournament. Back in the OHL for the 2014–15 season the Petes went 26–36–0–6 but still qualified for the postseason, losing to the Generals again, this time in the first round. In 2015–16, the Petes went 33–28–0–7 in 68 games making the playoffs again. He registered his 100th career win as a head coach on February 8, 2016 in a 4–1 victory over the Hamilton Bulldogs. However, the team bowed out in the first round for the second consecutive season, this time losing to the North Bay Battalion. In 2016–17, Hull had his most successful campaign with the Petes, going 42–21–0–5 and finishing atop the East Division. In the playoffs they reached the Eastern Conference final before being eliminated by the Mississauga Steelheads. Hull was fired by the Petes on January 5, 2018, after the team struggled, going 16–20–2–1 to open the season. In his five seasons in Peterborough he went 167–147–7–23.

=== Niagara IceDogs ===
Hull joined the Niagara IceDogs of the OHL as an associate coach on August 17, 2018 ahead of the 2018–19 season. He remained with the IceDogs in that capacity through to the 2021–22 season, when he was named the team's interim head coach on April 8, 2022 for the remainder of the season, after the head coach, Billy Burke, was suspended by the league.

=== Tri-City Americans ===
After his contract expired with Niagara, he joined the Tri-City Americans of the Western Hockey League (WHL) as an associate coach, joining head coach Stu Barnes' management group on August 22, 2022. He was promoted to head coach on June 23, 2025.

== Career statistics ==
=== Regular season and playoffs ===
			Regular season					Playoffs
Season	Team	League	GP	G	A	Pts	PIM	GP	G	A	Pts	PIM
1984–85	Cambridge Winter Hawks	MWJHL	38	13	17	30	39	—	—	—	—	—
1985–86	Peterborough Petes	OHL	61	20	22	42	29	16	1	5	6	4
1986–87	Peterborough Petes	OHL	49	18	34	52	22	12	4	9	13	14
1987–88	Peterborough Petes	OHL	60	50	44	94	33	12	10	8	18	8
1988–89	Hartford Whalers	NHL	60	16	18	34	10	1	0	0	0	2
1989–90	Binghamton Whalers	AHL	21	7	10	17	6	—	—	—	—	—
1989–90	Hartford Whalers	NHL	38	7	10	17	21	5	0	1	1	2
1990–91	New York Rangers	NHL	47	5	8	13	10	—	—	—	—	—
1991–92	Binghamton Rangers	AHL	69	34	31	65	28	11	5	2	7	4
1991–92	New York Rangers	NHL	3	0	0	0	2	—	—	—	—	—
1992–93	Ottawa Senators	NHL	69	13	21	34	14	—	—	—	—	—
1993–94	Florida Panthers	NHL	69	13	13	26	8	—	—	—	—	—
1994–95	Florida Panthers	NHL	46	11	8	19	8	—	—	—	—	—
1995–96	Florida Panthers	NHL	78	20	17	37	25	14	3	2	5	0
1996–97	Florida Panthers	NHL	67	10	6	16	4	5	0	0	0	0
1997–98	Florida Panthers	NHL	21	2	0	2	4	—	—	—	—	—
1997–98	Tampa Bay Lightning	NHL	28	2	4	6	4	—	—	—	—	—
1998–99	Philadelphia Flyers	NHL	72	3	11	14	12	6	0	0	0	4
1999–2000	Orlando Solar Bears	IHL	1	0	0	0	0	—	—	—	—	—
1999–2000	Philadelphia Flyers	NHL	67	10	3	13	4	18	0	1	1	0
2000–01	Philadelphia Flyers	NHL	71	7	8	15	10	6	0	0	0	4
2001–02	Ottawa Senators	NHL	24	2	2	4	6	12	1	1	2	2
2001–02	Grand Rapids Griffins	AHL	3	2	1	3	2	—	—	—	—	—
2002–03	Ottawa Senators	NHL	70	3	8	11	14	2	0	0	0	0
2003–04	Ottawa Senators	NHL	1	0	0	0	0	—	—	—	—	—
2003–04	Binghamton Senators	AHL	32	1	9	10	6	2	0	0	0	0
	NHL totals		831	124	137	261	156	69	4	5	9	14

=== International ===
Year	Team	Event	GP	G	A	Pts	PIM
1988	Canada	WJC	7	2	1	3	2

== Bibliography ==
- MacGregor, Roy (1993). Road Games: A Year in the Life of the NHL. Toronto: MacFarlane Walter & Ross. ISBN 0-921912-70-6.

Preceded by Scott Young	Hartford Whalers first-round draft pick 1987	Succeeded by Chris Govedaris
