= Scott Fankhouser =

American ice hockey player

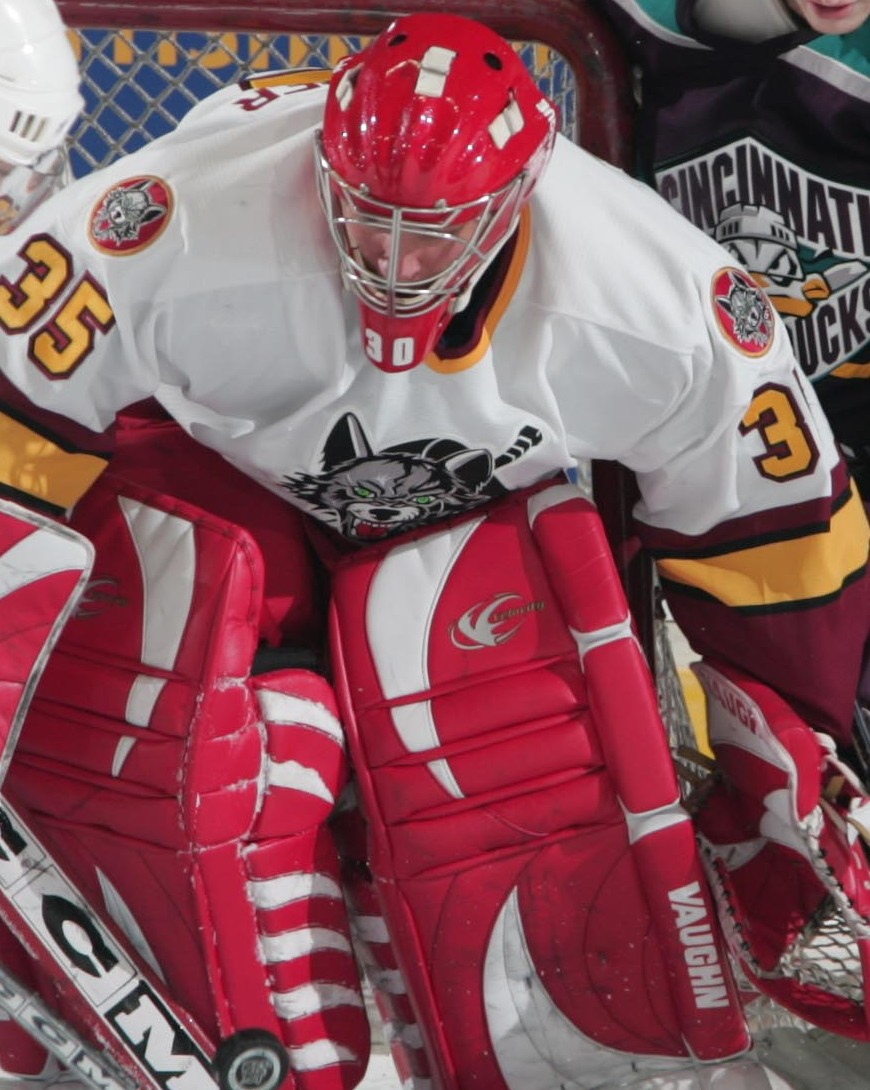
- Fankhouser with the Chicago Wolves in 2004
- Born: July 1, 1975 (age 50) Bismarck, North Dakota, U.S.
- Height: 6 ft 2 in (188 cm)
- Weight: 206 lb (93 kg; 14 st 10 lb)
- Position: Goaltender
- Caught: Left
- Played for: Atlanta Thrashers
- NHL draft: 276th overall, 1994; St. Louis Blues
- Playing career: 1999–2009

Scott A. Fankhouser (born July 1, 1975) is an American former professional ice hockey goaltender. He played 23 games in the National Hockey League (NHL) with the Atlanta Thrashers between 1999 and 2001. The rest of his career, which lasted from 1999 to 2009, was spent in various minor leagues and with teams in Europe. After retiring from playing he served as an Assistant Coach for the Cincinnati Cyclones of the ECHL, and coached the Evansville Thunderbolts of the North American 3 Hockey League for a single season.

== Playing career ==
Fankhouser began his career playing at NCAA level with the University of Massachusetts Lowell. He was employed mainly as a back-up goaltender in his first three years, managing just 38 appearances in three terms. In his final year at the university however, he stepped up to become first choice, and over 32 games kept his goals against average down to 2.78.

At the end of his university career, Fankhouser was drafted by the St. Louis Blues of the NHL and was initially sent to play for the Greenville Grrrowl in South Carolina at ECHL level, but during the season would also feature in two more leagues, the AHL and the IHL for the Louisville Panthers and the Orlando Solar Bears respectively. During this period, Fankhouser had also moved from being under contract to the Blues to sign for the Atlanta Thrashers, and would go on to make his NHL debut for his new team featuring in 16 top-level games.

The following season, Fankhouser would again play for the Thrashers several times, as well as a second spell at their IHL affiliate, the Solar Bears. Unfortunately for Fankhouser, these appearances would prove to be his last in the NHL to date. In the 2001/02 term, he would make another return journey, this time back to Greenville to play for the Grrrowl again. Fankhouser also enjoyed short spells with the Hershey Bears and the Chicago Wolves.

During the off-season, Fankhouser was again on the move, signing for the Reading Royals of the ECHL, but again did not complete a full season for one team, splitting his time with 19 games for the Arkansas RiverBlades. In 2003/04, Fankhouser would manage his first full season playing for one team since his university days, playing over 30 games in Germany for Bietigheim-Bissingen SC in the Second Bundesliga.

In 2004/05, Fankhouser returned to North America, again splitting his season, this time between the Toledo Storm and a short second spell back in Chicago. Fankhouser switched back to Europe again the season after, this time playing in the Austrian league for the Graz 99ers as their number one goaltender. He would remain in Austria the following season, but this time playing for the Vienna Capitals.

During the summer of 2005, Fankhouser again chose to remain playing in Europe, this time for the Manchester Phoenix in the EIHL, the top level of ice hockey in Britain. During his time at the Phoenix, Fankhouser established himself as the first choice goaltender and started the season well, winning the EIHL 'Player of the Week' award early in the term. Unfortunately this form did not last and Fankhouser was part of a notably leaky Manchester defence, regularly conceding more than five goals. He was released by the Phoenix following their exit from the first round of the post-season.

Fankhouser returned to North America and, along with Phoenix teammate Jeff MacMillan signed for the Bloomington Prairie Thunder, a team icing in the United Hockey League. He was called up by the Milwaukee Admirals of the American Hockey League in January 2009 for a brief stint, but was soon returned to the UHL.

== Career statistics ==
=== Regular season and playoffs ===
			Regular season									Playoffs
Season	Team	League	GP	W	L	T	MIN	GA	SO	GAA	SV%	GP	W	L	MIN	GA	SO	GAA	SV%
1993–94	Loomis Chaffee School	HS-CT	—	—	—	—	—	—	—	—	—	—	—	—	—	—	—	—	—
1994–95	University of Massachusetts Lowell	HE	11	4	4	1	499	37	0	4.44	—	—	—	—	—	—	—	—	—
1995–96	Melfort Mustangs	SJHL	45	31	9	4	2544	109	3	2.57	.864	—	—	—	—	—	—	—	—
1996–97	University of Massachusetts Lowell	HE	11	2	4	1	517	38	0	4.41	.867	—	—	—	—	—	—	—	—
1997–98	University of Massachusetts Lowell	HE	16	4	7	2	798	48	0	3.61	.880	—	—	—	—	—	—	—	—
1998–99	University of Massachusetts Lowell	HE	32	16	14	0	1729	80	1	2.78	.896	—	—	—	—	—	—	—	—
1999–00	Atlanta Thrashers	NHL	16	2	11	2	920	49	0	3.20	.891	—	—	—	—	—	—	—	—
1999–00	Greenville Grrrowl	ECHL	7	6	1	0	419	18	0	2.58	.906	—	—	—	—	—	—	—	—
1999–00	Orlando Solar Bears	IHL	6	2	2	1	320	14	0	2.63	.890	—	—	—	—	—	—	—	—
1999–00	Louisville Panthers	AHL	1	0	1	0	59	3	0	3.05	.875	—	—	—	—	—	—	—	—
2000–01	Atlanta Thrashers	NHL	7	3	2	1	260	16	0	3.70	.900	—	—	—	—	—	—	—	—
2000–01	Orlando Solar Bears	IHL	28	13	12	3	1603	69	1	2.58	.898	1	0	0	37	3	0	4.83	.769
2001–02	Greenville Grrrowl	ECHL	3	1	2	0	180	11	0	3.67	.919	—	—	—	—	—	—	—	—
2001–02	Hershey Bears	AHL	8	5	2	1	487	19	1	2.34	.919	3	0	0	41	3	0	4.44	.824
2001–02	Chicago Wolves	AHL	2	1	0	1	125	4	0	2.34	.944	—	—	—	—	—	—	—	—
2002–03	Reading Royals	ECHL	26	11	12	1	1463	94	0	3.86	.888	—	—	—	—	—	—	—	—
2002–03	Arkansas RiverBlades	ECHL	19	11	5	2	1110	49	1	2.65	.917	3	0	3	177	7	0	2.38	.936
2003–04	Bietigheim Steelers	GER-2	34	—	—	—	—	—	—	3.04	—	8	—	—	—	—	—	2.50	—
2004–05	Toledo Storm	ECHL	51	29	15	4	2969	116	4	2.34	.918	4	1	3	234	7	1	1.79	.944
2005–06	Graz 99ers	EBEL	47	—	—	—	—	—	—	3.33	.899	—	—	—	—	—	—	—	—
2006–07	Vienna Capitals	EBEL	54	—	—	—	—	—	—	3.49	.897	3	—	—	—	—	—	6.40	.827
2007–08	Manchester Phoenix	EIHL	50	—	—	—	—	—	—	3.19	.898	2	—	—	—	—	—	4.50	.864
2008–09	Bloomington PrairieThunder	IHL	24	—	—	—	—	—	—	4.05	.870	—	—	—	—	—	—	—	—
NHL totals			23	4	12	2	1180	65	0	3.31	.894	—	—	—	—	—	—	—	—
