= Orlando Solar Bears (IHL) =

IHL ice hockey team

- City: Orlando, Florida
- League: IHL
- Conference: Eastern Conference
- Division: Central (1995–96); Northeast (1996–99)
- Founded: 1994
- Operated: 1995–2001
- Home arena: Orlando Arena
- Colors: Solar purple, seafoam green, sunset orange, white
- Owner: RDV Sports, Inc.
- General manager: Don Waddell (1995–97); John Weisbrod (1997–2001)
- Head coach: Curt Fraser (1995–99); Peter Horachek (1999–2001)
- Media: Sunshine Network; WZKD (AM 950); WFLF (AM 540)
- Affiliates: Atlanta Thrashers (NHL) 1999–2001; Greenville Grrrowl (ECHL); Mississippi Sea Wolves (ECHL)

Championships
- Division titles: 1 1995–96
- Conference titles: 3 1995–96, 1998–99, 2000–01
- Turner Cups: 1 2000–01

The Orlando Solar Bears were a professional minor league ice hockey team based in Orlando, Florida. The Solar Bears played in the International Hockey League's Eastern Conference. They played their home games at the Orlando Arena.

== Facts ==
Turner Cup Champions: 1 — 2000–01

Runner-up: 2 — 1995–96, 1998–99

Conference champions: Eastern: 3 — 1995–96, 1998–99, 2000–01
Division champions: Central: 1 — 1995–96
Main Rival: Detroit Vipers

== Franchise history ==
The Solar Bears franchise started in 1995 and played in the International Hockey League (IHL) until the league folded in 2001. They were owned by the DeVos family, who also owned the Grand Rapids Griffins and the Kansas City Blades of the IHL and the Orlando Magic of the NBA. During their time in the IHL, the team made it to three Turner Cup finals, being swept by the Utah Grizzlies in 1996, losing in game seven to the Houston Aeros in 1999 and defeating the Chicago Wolves in five games in 2001, which was the final Turner Cup Championship.

Several IHL teams were taken into the American Hockey League, but the Solar Bears were not among them. The DeVos family could only bring one team into the AHL, and chose the Griffins because the Solar Bears had never drawn well despite their on-ice success, including being the second-last team to win the Turner Cup. A handful of Solar Bears went on to play for the team they defeated for the championship, the Chicago Wolves, in the AHL, most notably goalie Norm Maracle, the IHL MVP of that deciding playoff series. That Wolves team went on to win the Calder Cup in their first AHL season.

During its inaugural season, the Solar Bears starred center Alfie Turcotte, former first round pick of the Montreal Canadiens. Other notable team members included: Hubie McDonough (New York Islanders), C.; Pat Neaton, D.; Barry Dreger, D.; Todd Richards, F.; Craig Fisher (Philadelphia Flyers), D.; Curtis Murphy, D.; Allan Bester, G.; Scott LaGrand; Dave Barr. C.; Mark Beaufait, F.; Todd Krygier (Washington Capitals), F.; Kirby Law, F.; Mike Hartman, F.; Jason Blake, F.; Zac Boyer, F.; Grigori Panteleev, F; Herbert Vasiljevs, F.; and Dan Snyder, F.

In the 1999 Turner Cup Conference Finals, the Solar Bears completed the only successful comeback from a 0–3 deficit in the 56-year history of the International Hockey League, against the Detroit Vipers. In Game 7, rookie Jason Blake scored twice in regulation and winger Todd Krygier got the game-winner 25 seconds into the second overtime, giving Orlando a 5–4 victory. The Solar Bears went on to lose in the finals, 4 games to 3, to the Houston Aeros.

In 2011, the ECHL announced a new franchise had been awarded to Orlando. On November 16, 2011, it was announced that the new team would be named the Orlando Solar Bears.

== Season-by-season record ==
Note: GP = Games played, W = Wins, L = Losses, SOL = Shootout losses, Pts = Points, GF = Goals for, GA = Goals against

Turner Cup Champions †	Fred A. Huber Trophy *	Conference champions ^	Division champions ¤

IHL season	Conference	Division	Regular season								Postseason					
IHL season	Conference	Division	Finish	GP	W	L	SOL	Pts^{[a]}	GF	GA	GP	W	L	GF	GA	Result
1995–96	Eastern ^	Central ¤	1st	82	52	24	6	110	352	307	23	11	12	71	73	Won in conference quarterfinals, 3–2 (Komets); Won in conference semifinals, 4–3 (Vipers); Won in conference finals, 4–3 (Cyclones); Lost in Turner Cup Final, 0–4 (Grizzlies)
1996–97	Eastern	North	2nd	82	53	24	5	111	305	232	10	4	6	30	33	Won in first round, 3–2 (Griffins); Lost in quarterfinals, 1–4 (Lumberjacks)
1997–98	Eastern	Northeast	2nd	82	42	30	10	94	258	251	17	9	8	62	54	Won in 1/8 Finals, 3–2 (Ice); Won in quarterfinals, 4–2 (Lumberjacks); Lost in semifinals, 2–4 (Vipers)
1998–99	Eastern ^	Northeast	2nd	82	45	33	4	94	264	253	17	10	7	54	58	Won in quarterfinals, 3–0 (K-Wings); Won in semifinals, 4–3 (Vipers); Lost in Turner Cup Final, 3–4 (Aeros)
1999–00	Eastern	—	2nd	82	47	23	12	106	250	202	6	2	4	11	19	Lost in quarterfinals, 2–4 (Cyclones)
2000–01	Eastern ^	—	2nd	82	47	28	7	101	241	193	16	12	4	56	41	Won in quarterfinals, 4–1 (Cyclones); Won in semifinals, 4–2 (Griffins); Won in Turner Cup Final, 4–1 (Wolves) †
IHL Totals (6 seasons)				492	286	162	44	616	1,670	1,438	89	48	41	284	278	6 playoff appearances

^{a} Wins are worth two points, losses are worth zero points and ties, overtime losses and shootout losses are worth one point.

== IHL Awards and Trophies ==
Turner Cup

- 2000–01

Eastern Conference Champions Trophy

- 1995–96, 1998–99, 2000–01

James Norris Memorial Trophy (Best Goaltender – Statistical)

- Norm Maracle, Scott Fankhouser: 2000–01

Commissioners' Trophy (Coach of the Year)

- Pete Horachek: 2000–01

Ken McKenzie Trophy (American Born Rookie of the Year)

- Brian Felsner: 1996–97
- Eric Nickulas: 1997–98
- Brian Pothier: 2000–01

James Gatschene Memorial Trophy (Most Valuable Player)

- Norm Maracle: 2000–01

N.R. Poile Trophy (Playoff MVP)

- Norm Maracle: 2000–01

Gary F. Longman Memorial Trophy (Rookie of the Year)

- Brian Pothier: 2000–01

Comeback Player of the Year

- Kevin Smyth: 1996–97

== Orlando Solar Bear Individual Records ==
Most Goals in a season: Craig Fisher, 74 (1995–96)
Most Assists in a season: Mark Beaufait, 79 (1995–96)
Most Points in a season: Craig Fisher, 130 (1995–96)
Most Penalty Minutes in a season: Barry Dreger, 387 (1996–97)
Most Wins in a season: Allan Bester, 37 (1996–97)
Most Shutouts in a season: Norm Maracle, 8 (2000–01)
