= Hugo Boisvert =

Canadian ice hockey player (born 1976)

- Born: February 11, 1976 (age 50) Saint-Eustache, Quebec, Canada
- Height: 6 ft 0 in (183 cm)
- Weight: 194 lb (88 kg; 13 st 12 lb)
- Position: Center
- Shot: Left
- Played for: Orlando Solar Bears; Grand Rapids Griffins; Füchse Duisburg; Kassel Huskies; Dresdner Eislöwen
- National team: Canada
- Playing career: 1996–2015

Hugo Boisvert is a Canadian ice hockey coach and retired center who was a two-time All-American for Ohio State.

== Career ==
Boisvert was the star player for his junior team, the Cornwall Colts. He led the club in scoring twice, averaging more than two points per games both times. He helped the team win back-to-back league championships. Boisvert began attending Ohio State University in 1996 and immediately began to produce offensively. He finished his freshman season at a point per game pace and was named to the conference Rookie Team. The following year, Boisvert led the team in scoring and was named an All-American but the team performed even better. Ohio State reached the CCHA championship game for the first time in 26 years and received their first bid to the NCAA Tournament. The Buckeyes won their first two tournament games and reached the Frozen Four. Boisvert's numbers declined slightly as a junior but he still led the team in scoring by 14 points. He led the team back to the NCAA Tournament but this time they fell in their opening game.

Boisvert left Ohio State after his junior season and played on the Canadian national team for a year. Afterwards, he began his professional career with a rather unimpressive season for the Orlando Solar Bears in the final year of the IHL. He picked up his scoring in the postseason and was able to earn a job with the Grand Rapids Griffins, playing three seasons for the club. In 2004, Boisvert travelled to Europe and began playing in Germany.

In his first year with the Füchse Duisburg, Boisvert rediscovered his scoring touch and helped the team win promotion to the DEL. After helping them stave off relegation the following year, he signed on with the Kassel Huskies, whom had been relegated that year, and performed well for the team. He was named team captain in 2007 and led them to a league championship, securing promotion back to the top level of German ice hockey. Boisvert remained with the club for two more years before moving down to another Bundesliga team, Dresdner Eislöwen. By this time, Boisvert's scoring was declining and though he still played well, he was unable to get a third team promoted to the DEL. He stayed with the club for 5 years before retiring as a player in 2015.

The next season, Boisvert returned to the Huskies as an assistant coach. After three years, he was named the head coach for the Bietigheim Steelers. After finishing as runners-up in the regular season in 2019, the club declined and Boisvert was let go in November the following year. After sitting out the 20-21 season, Boisvert was back behind the bench as an assistant with Rote Teufel Bad Nauheim in 2021.

Boisvert was inducted into the Ohio State Athletic Hall of Fame in 2013.

== Personal ==
Hugo's son Zavier, born 2006, plays junior ice hockey in Germany.

== Statistics ==
=== Regular season and playoffs ===
			Regular Season					Playoffs
Season	Team	League	GP	G	A	Pts	PIM	GP	G	A	Pts	PIM
1992–93	Laval-Laurentides-Lanaudière Régents	QMAAA	42	7	10	17	15	13	2	3	5	6
1993–94	St-Jérôme Panthers	QJHL	17	3	5	8	8	—	—	—	—	—
1993–94	Cornwall Colts	CJHL	27	13	19	32	26	—	—	—	—	—
1994–95	Cornwall Colts	CJHL	51	37	66	103	54	17	6	13	19	24
1995–96	Cornwall Colts	CJHL	52	40	90	130	102	15	15	20	35	44
1996–97	Ohio State	CCHA	38	11	27	38	44	—	—	—	—	—
1997–98	Ohio State	CCHA	42	23	35	58	70	—	—	—	—	—
1998–99	Ohio State	CCHA	41	24	27	51	54	—	—	—	—	—
1999–00	Team Canada	International	39	10	14	24	12	—	—	—	—	—
2000–01	Orlando Solar Bears	IHL	68	6	12	18	41	16	4	5	9	23
2001–02	Grand Rapids Griffins	AHL	74	11	18	29	48	5	1	3	4	4
2002–03	Grand Rapids Griffins	AHL	78	18	13	31	68	15	5	1	6	10
2003–04	Grand Rapids Griffins	AHL	80	9	16	25	48	4	0	0	0	8
2004–05	Füchse Duisburg	Bundesliga	51	32	38	70	91	12	9	9	18	16
2005–06	Füchse Duisburg	DEL	43	12	14	26	75	5	0	7	7	10
2006–07	Kassel Huskies	Bundesliga	51	25	29	54	122	10	4	3	7	12
2007–08	Kassel Huskies	Bundesliga	50	18	26	44	72	15	4	11	15	16
2008–09	Kassel Huskies	DEL	50	16	16	32	48	—	—	—	—	—
2009–10	Kassel Huskies	DEL	56	7	11	18	36	—	—	—	—	—
2010–11	Dresdner Eislöwen	Bundesliga	35	11	13	24	18	9	4	5	9	6
2011–12	Dresdner Eislöwen	Bundesliga	47	14	17	31	38	8	1	1	2	4
2012–13	Dresdner Eislöwen	Bundesliga	48	7	13	20	45	—	—	—	—	—
2013–14	Dresdner Eislöwen	DEL2	52	12	25	37	26	5	1	0	1	4
2014–15	Dresdner Eislöwen	DEL2	52	16	25	41	14	7	0	0	0	2
CJHL totals			130	90	175	265	182	32	21	33	54	68
NCAA totals			121	58	89	147	168	—	—	—	—	—
Bundesliga/DEL2 totals			386	135	186	321	426	66	23	29	52	60
DEL totals			149	35	41	76	159	5	0	7	7	10

== Awards and honors ==
Award	Year
All-CCHA Rookie Team	1996–97
All-CCHA First Team	1997–98; 1998–99
AHCA West First-Team All-American	1997–98
AHCA West Second-Team All-American	1998–99
