= Chad Alban =

American ice hockey player (born 1976)

- Born: April 27, 1976 (age 50) Kalamazoo, Michigan, U.S.
- Height: 5 ft 9 in (175 cm)
- Weight: 165 lb (75 kg; 11 st 11 lb)
- Position: Goaltender
- Shot: Right
- Played for: HC Neftekhimik Nizhnekamsk; Traktor Chelyabinsk
- Playing career: 1991–2009

Chad Richard Alban (born April 27, 1976) is an American former professional ice hockey player.

== Career ==
Alban started his college career at Michigan State in 1994. He became the starter in his sophomore season and held the job for the next three years. In Alban's senior season he posted program records in most goaltending categories including goals against average (1.57), save percentage (.926), shutouts (6) and was one win behind Jason Muzzatti for the most in team history. Alban became just the fourth college goaltender to be credited with a goal near the end of the season, and was the first to have actually shot the puck on goal. He led the Spartans to their first conference championship in eight years and allowed only five goals in four games as MSU won the CCHA Tournament. In the first game of the NCAA Tournament, (Ohio State), the team they had defeated for the conference crown, won 4–3 in overtime, ending Alban's college career. As of 2020 Alban is still the career leader in wins for the Spartans. He finished as the runner up to Chris Drury for the 1998 Hobey Baker Award, given annually to the best college player.

Alban played minor league hockey for several teams over the next few years and was eventually signed to a contract by the Dallas Stars. While he stayed mostly with their affiliate the Utah Grizzlies, Alban was called up twice in the early 2000s to serve as a backup, but did not play in any of the three games for which he dressed. After leaving the Stars organization, he joined the Kalamazoo Wings for three years before playing in the Russian Super League for two seasons. Alban ended his playing career in 2009 after two more years with the Flint Generals.

== Career statistics ==
=== Regular season and playoffs ===
			Regular season									Playoffs
Season	Team	League	GP	W	L	T	MIN	GA	SO	GAA	SV%	GP	W	L	MIN	GA	SO	GAA	SV%
1991–92	Kalamazoo Jr. Wings	NAHL	—	—	—	—	—	—	—	—	—	—	—	—	—	—	—	—	—
1992–93	Kalamazoo Jr. Wings	NAHL	—	—	—	—	—	—	—	—	—	—	—	—	—	—	—	—	—
1994–95	Michigan State University	CCHA	13	8	2	0	636	29	0	2.73	.893	—	—	—	—	—	—	—	—
1995–96	Michigan State University	CCHA	40	26	13	1	2286	117	3	3.07	.876	—	—	—	—	—	—	—	—
1996–97	Michigan State University	CCHA	39	23	11	4	2272	103	3	2.72	.894	—	—	—	—	—	—	—	—
1997–98	Michigan State University	CCHA	40	31	4	5	2438	64	6	1.57	.926	—	—	—	—	—	—	—	—
1998–99	Mobile Mysticks	ECHL	34	16	14	3	1960	111	1	3.40	.902	2	0	2	119	9	0	4.53	.897
1998–99	Houston Aeros	IHL	5	1	3	1	284	14	0	2.96	.898	—	—	—	—	—	—	—	—
1999–00	Mobile Mysticks	ECHL	39	25	13	1	2334	114	0	2.93	.914	5	2	3	299	20	0	4.01	.889
1999–00	Utah Grizzlies	IHL	1	0	1	0	35	3	0	5.16	.813	—	—	—	—	—	—	—	—
2000–01	Utah Grizzlies	IHL	11	2	4	4	597	23	0	2.31	.926	—	—	—	—	—	—	—	—
2000–01	Grand Rapids Griffins	IHL	3	2	1	0	180	4	1	1.33	.953	—	—	—	—	—	—	—	—
2000–01	Idaho Steelheads	WCHL	20	14	5	1	1121	56	1	3.00	.900	10	6	4	596	33	0	3.32	.904
2001–02	Utah Grizzlies	AHL	42	17	15	1	2103	103	2	2.94	.908	—	—	—	—	—	—	—	—
2002–03	Kalamazoo Wings	UHL	54	21	25	5	3084	175	1	3.40	.896	—	—	—	—	—	—	—	—
2002–03	Grand Rapids Griffins	AHL	2	1	0	0	77	3	0	2.34	.893	—	—	—	—	—	—	—	—
2003–04	Kalamazoo Wings	UHL	54	34	13	6	3200	122	8	2.29	.913	5	2	3	308	12	1	2.33	.919
2004–05	Kalamazoo Wings	UHL	54	33	16	5	3227	132	2	2.45	.907	3	0	3	157	11	0	4.19	.866
2005–06	Neftekhimik Nizhnekamsk	RSL	16	5	4	3	850	29	2	2.05	.909	5	2	3	298	11	0	2.21	.909
2006–07	Traktor Chelyabinsk	RSL	11	2	6	2	646	31	0	2.88	.898	—	—	—	—	—	—	—	—
2007–08	Flint Generals	IHL	14	9	3	2	799	33	1	2.48	.927	5	1	4	318	19	0	3.59	.894
2008–09	Flint Generals	IHL	51	15	29	6	2927	213	1	4.36	.882	—	—	—	—	—	—	—	—
RSL totals			27	7	10	5	1496	60	2	2.40	—	—	—	—	—	—	—	—	—

== Awards and honors ==
Award	Year
CCHA All-Tournament Team	1996–97
All-CCHA First Team	1997–98
AHCA East First Team All-American	1997–98

Awards and achievements
Preceded by Brendan Morrison	CCHA Player of the Year; 1997–98	Succeeded by Mike York
