= 1998 ECAC Hockey men's ice hockey tournament =

1998 ECAC Men's ice hockey tournament
- Dates: March 13–21, 1998
- Teams: 10
- Finals site: Olympic Arena; Lake Placid, New York
- Champions: Princeton (1st title)
- Winning coach: Don Cahoon (1st title)
- MVP: Jeff Halpern (Princeton)
- ECAC Men's Ice Hockey Tournaments

The 1998 ECAC Hockey Men's Ice Hockey Tournament was the 37th tournament in league history. It was played between March 13 and March 21, 1998. Quarterfinal games were played at home team campus sites, while the final five games were played at the Olympic Arena (subsequently renamed Herb Brooks Arena) in Lake Placid, New York. By winning the tournament, Princeton received the ECAC's automatic bid to the 1998 NCAA Division I Men's Ice Hockey Tournament.

== Format ==
The tournament featured three rounds of play. The two teams that finish below tenth place in the standings are not eligible for tournament play. In the first round, the first and tenth seeds, the second and ninth seeds, the third seed and eighth seeds, the fourth seed and seventh seeds and the fifth seed and sixth seeds played a modified best-of-three series, where the first team to receive 3 points moves on, with the three highest-seeded winners advancing to the semifinals and the remaining two winners playing in the Four vs. Five matchup. After the opening round every series becomes a single-elimination game. In the semifinals, the highest seed plays the winner of the four vs. five game while the two remaining teams play with the winners advancing to the championship game and the losers advancing to the third place game. The tournament champion receives an automatic bid to the 1998 NCAA Division I Men's Ice Hockey Tournament.

== Conference standings ==
Note: GP = Games played; W = Wins; L = Losses; T = Ties; PTS = Points; GF = Goals For; GA = Goals Against

1997–98 ECAC Hockey standings
	Conference							Overall					
	GP	W	L	T	PTS	GF	GA	GP	W	L	T	GF	GA
Yale†	22	17	4	1	35	82	44	35	23	9	3	121	80
Clarkson	22	16	4	2	34	86	48	35	23	9	3	128	87
Rensselaer	22	11	7	4	26	87	75	35	18	13	4	126	110
Brown	22	11	9	2	24	73	64	31	13	16	2	100	104
Harvard	22	10	11	1	21	72	78	33	14	17	2	112	124
Colgate	22	9	10	3	21	69	75	35	16	15	4	116	126
Princeton*	22	7	9	6	20	71	75	36	18	11	7	125	112
Cornell	22	9	12	1	19	55	68	33	15	16	2	84	101
Vermont	22	7	11	4	18	62	77	34	10	20	4	89	119
St. Lawrence	22	8	12	2	18	56	69	33	9	20	4	90	123
Dartmouth	22	7	12	3	17	72	77	29	11	13	5	96	88
Union	22	4	15	3	11	42	76	32	6	22	4	74	117
Championship: Princeton † indicates conference regular season champion * indicates conference tournament champion (Whitelaw Cup); Final rankings: USA Today/American Hockey Magazine Coaches Poll Top 10 Poll

== Bracket ==
Teams are reseeded after the First Round

First Round; March 13–15
1	Yale	3*	3*	4
10	St. Lawrence	3	3	1
2	Clarkson	2*	5	—
9	Vermont	1	3	—
3	Rensselaer	4	3	4
8	Cornell	5	0	5
4	Brown	2	6	3
7	Princeton	3	0	5
5	Harvard	5	4	—
6	Colgate	4	2	—

Four vs. Five; March 19
7	Princeton	6
8	Cornell	2

Semifinals; March 20
1	Yale	1
7	Princeton	2
2	Clarkson	6
5	Harvard	2

Championship; March 21
2	Clarkson	4
7	Princeton	5**

Note: * denotes overtime period(s)

=== First round ===
==== (1) Yale vs. (10) St. Lawrence ====
March 13	Yale	3 – 3	OT	St. Lawrence	Ingalls Rink

March 14	Yale	3 – 3	OT	St. Lawrence	Ingalls Rink

March 15	Yale	4 – 1	St. Lawrence	Ingalls Rink

Yale won series 1–0–2

==== (2) Clarkson vs. (9) Vermont ====
March 13	Clarkson	2 – 1	OT	Vermont	Cheel Arena

March 14	Clarkson	5 – 3	Vermont	Cheel Arena

Clarkson won series 2–0

==== (3) Rensselaer vs. (8) Cornell ====
March 13	Rensselaer	4 – 5	Cornell	Houston Field House

March 14	Rensselaer	3 – 0	Cornell	Houston Field House

March 15	Rensselaer	4 – 5	Cornell	Houston Field House

Cornell won series 2–1

==== (4) Brown vs. (7) Princeton ====
March 13	Brown	2 – 3	Princeton	Meehan Auditorium

March 14	Brown	6 – 0	Princeton	Meehan Auditorium

March 15	Brown	3 – 5	Princeton	Meehan Auditorium

Princeton won series 2–1

==== (5) Harvard vs. (6) Colgate ====
March 13	Harvard	5 – 4	Colgate	Bright Hockey Center

March 14	Harvard	4 – 2	Colgate	Bright Hockey Center

Harvard won series 2–0

=== Four vs. Five ===
==== (7) Princeton vs. (8) Cornell ====
March 19	Princeton	6 – 2	Cornell	Olympic Arena

=== Semifinals ===
==== (1) Yale vs. (7) Princeton ====
March 20	Yale	1 – 2	Princeton	Olympic Arena

==== (2) Clarkson vs. (5) Harvard ====
March 20	Clarkson	6 – 2	Harvard	Olympic Arena

=== Third place ===
==== (1) Yale vs. (5) Harvard ====
March 21	Yale	1 – 4	Harvard	Olympic Arena

=== Championship ===
==== (2) Clarkson vs. (7) Princeton ====
March 21	Clarkson	4 – 5	2OT	Princeton	Olympic Arena

== Tournament awards ==
=== All-Tournament Team ===
- F Syl Apps III (Princeton)
- F Jeff Halpern* (Princeton)
- F Matt Reid (Clarkson)
- D Willie Mitchell (Clarkson)
- D Steve Shirreffs (Princeton)
- G Erasmo Saltarelli (Princeton)

* Most Outstanding Player(s)
