= Sean Berens =

American ice hockey player

- Born: April 6, 1976 (age 48); Skokie, Illinois, USA
- Height: 5 ft 9 in (175 cm)
- Weight: 183 lb (83 kg; 13 st 1 lb)
- Position: Center
- Shot: Left
- Played for: Tacoma Sabercats; Saint John Flames; Las Vegas Thunder; Chicago Wolves; Cleveland Lumberjacks; Springfield Falcons; Baton Rouge Kingfish; Belfast Giants; Vienna Capitals; SC Langenthal; HC Fribourg-Gottéron
- Playing career: 1994–2005

Sean Berens is an American ice hockey coach and retired center who was an All-American for Michigan State.

== Career ==
Berens' college career began in the fall of 1994 when he debuted as a freshman for the Michigan State Spartans. As a senior he was named alternate captain and responded with his best season, leading the nation with 36 goals. He was named an All-American and helped the Spartans win the CCHA Tournament. As they had in each of Berens' season, Michigan State lost their opening game of the NCAA Tournament.

After graduating Berens began his professional career. Over a three-season span he moved between eight different teams in four leagues. While he did spend most of his time playing AAA hockey, Berens' decided to head to Europe in 2001. He played in four more teams in as many years, playing in five leagues across three countries. He retired as a player in 2005.

After returning to North America, Berens became a youth hockey coach in the Chicago area. He has been the head coach in the Team Illinois AAA organization since 2006 and also operates his own ice hockey training academy.

== Statistics ==
=== Regular season and playoffs ===
			Regular Season					Playoffs
Season	Team	League	GP	G	A	Pts	PIM	GP	G	A	Pts	PIM
1993–94	Dubuque Fighting Saints	USHL	47	31	50	81	81	—	—	—	—	—
1994–95	Michigan State	CCHA	40	16	6	22	22	—	—	—	—	—
1995–96	Michigan State	CCHA	42	12	25	37	32	—	—	—	—	—
1996–97	Michigan State	CCHA	39	20	24	44	42	—	—	—	—	—
1997–98	Michigan State	CCHA	42	36	19	55	60	—	—	—	—	—
1998–99	Tacoma Sabercats	WCHL	5	1	3	4	4	—	—	—	—	—
1998–99	Las Vegas Thunder	IHL	61	24	18	42	62	—	—	—	—	—
1998–99	Saint John Flames	AHL	11	2	0	2	6	2	0	0	0	0
1999–00	Chicago Wolves	IHL	31	4	9	13	34	—	—	—	—	—
1999–00	Springfield Falcons	AHL	6	0	2	2	4	—	—	—	—	—
1999–00	Cleveland Lumberjacks	IHL	11	3	1	4	12	9	3	2	5	8
2000–01	Baton Rouge Kingfish	ECHL	18	12	9	21	26	—	—	—	—	—
2000–01	Grand Rapids Griffins	IHL	37	3	8	11	26	4	0	0	0	0
2001–02	Belfast Giants	BISL	42	21	34	55	48	6	7	3	10	2
2002–03	Vienna Capitals	Austria	47	30	34	64	55	—	—	—	—	—
2003–04	Belfast Giants	EIHL	16	10	16	26	12	—	—	—	—	—
2003–04	SC Langenthal	NLB	16	15	16	31	10	—	—	—	—	—
2004–05	SC Langenthal	NLB	18	7	9	16	50	—	—	—	—	—
2004–05	HC Fribourg-Gottéron	NLA	1	0	0	0	2	—	—	—	—	—
NCAA totals			163	84	74	158	156	—	—	—	—	—
IHL totals			140	34	36	70	134	13	3	2	5	8
AHL totals			17	2	2	4	10	2	0	0	0	0
NLB totals			34	22	25	47	60	—	—	—	—	—

== Awards and honors ==
Award	Year
All-CCHA Second Team	1996–97
All-CCHA First Team	1997–98
AHCA West Second-Team All-American	1997–98
