= 1998 Hockey East men's ice hockey tournament =

1998 Hockey East Men's ice hockey tournament
- Dates: March 12–21, 1998
- Teams: 8
- Finals site: Fleet Center; Boston, Massachusetts
- Champions: Boston College (3rd title)
- Winning coach: Jerry York (1st title)
- MVP: Marty Reasoner (Boston College)
- Hockey East Men's Ice Hockey Tournaments

The 1998 Hockey East Men's Ice Hockey Tournament was the 14th tournament in the history of the conference. It was played between March 12 and March 21, 1998. Quarterfinal games were played at home team campus sites, while the final four games were played at the Fleet Center in Boston, Massachusetts, the home venue of the NHL's Boston Bruins. By winning the tournament, Boston College received the Hockey East's automatic bid to the 1998 NCAA Division I Men's Ice Hockey Tournament.

== Format ==
The tournament featured three rounds of play. The team that finishes ninth in the conference is not eligible for tournament play. In the first round, the first and eighth seeds, the second and seventh seeds, the third seed and sixth seeds, and the fourth seed and fifth seeds played a best-of-three with the winner advancing to the semifinals. In the semifinals, the highest and lowest seeds and second-highest and second-lowest seeds play a single elimination game, with the winner advancing to the championship game. The tournament champion receives an automatic bid to the 1998 NCAA Division I Men's Ice Hockey Tournament.

== Conference standings ==
Note: GP = Games played; W = Wins; L = Losses; T = Ties; PTS = Points; GF = Goals For; GA = Goals Against

1997–98 Hockey East standings
	Conference							Overall					
	GP	W	L	T	PTS	GF	GA	GP	W	L	T	GF	GA
Boston University†	24	18	4	2	38	95	52	38	28	8	2	155	86
Boston College*	24	15	5	4	34	107	78	42	28	9	5	191	123
New Hampshire	24	15	8	1	31	104	62	38	25	12	1	163	102
Northeastern	24	13	8	3	29	77	78	39	21	15	3	125	133
Massachusetts–Lowell	24	11	10	3	25	88	89	36	16	17	3	126	124
Maine	24	10	11	3	23	98	89	36	17	15	4	145	121
Providence	24	9	13	2	20	65	82	36	15	18	3	110	125
Merrimack	24	4	20	0	8	78	128	38	11	26	1	141	185
Massachusetts	24	3	19	2	8	62	116	33	6	24	3	78	141
Championship: Boston College † indicates conference regular season champion * indicates conference tournament champion Final rankings: USA Today/American Hockey Magazine Coaches Poll Top 10 Poll

== Bracket ==
Teams are reseeded after the quarterfinals

Quarterfinals; March 12–15
1	Boston University	1	6	4
8	Merrimack	4	5	5
2	Boston College	4	6	—
7	Providence	3	3	—
(Pairings are reseeded after the first round)
3	New Hampshire	2	3	—
6	Maine	3**	5	—
4	Northeastern	2	3	1
5	Massachusetts-Lowell	8	2	5

Semifinals; March 20
2	Boston College	7
8	Merrimack	2
5	Massachusetts-Lowell	2
6	Maine	6

Championship; March 21
2	Boston College	3
6	Maine	2

Note: * denotes overtime period(s)

=== Quarterfinals ===
==== (1) Boston University vs. (8) Merrimack ====
March 13	Boston University	1 – 4	Merrimack	Walter Brown Arena

March 14	Boston University	6 – 5	Merrimack	Walter Brown Arena

March 15	Boston University	4 – 5	Merrimack	Walter Brown Arena

Merrimack won series 2–1

==== (2) Boston College vs. (7) Massachusetts ====
March 12	Boston College	4 – 3	Massachusetts	Conte Forum

March 13	Boston College	6 – 3	Massachusetts	Conte Forum

Boston College won series 2–0

==== (3) New Hampshire vs. (6) Maine ====
March 13	New Hampshire	2 – 3	2OT	Maine	Whittemore Center

March 14	New Hampshire	3 – 5	Maine	Whittemore Center

Maine won series 2–0

==== (4) Northeastern vs. (5) Massachusetts-Lowell ====
March 12	Northeastern	2 – 8	Massachusetts-Lowell	Matthews Arena

March 13	Northeastern	3 – 2	Massachusetts-Lowell	Matthews Arena

March 15	Northeastern	1 – 5	Massachusetts-Lowell	Matthews Arena

Massachusetts-Lowell won series 2–1

=== Semifinals ===
==== (2) Boston College vs. (8) Merrimack ====
March 20	Boston College	7 – 2	Merrimack	Fleet Center

==== (5) Massachusetts-Lowell vs. (6) Maine ====
March 20	Massachusetts-Lowell	2 – 6	Maine	Fleet Center

=== Championship ===
==== (2) Boston College vs. (6) Maine ====
March 21	Boston College	3 – 2	Maine	Fleet Center

== Tournament awards ==
=== All-Tournament Team ===
- F Jeff Farkas (Boston College)
- F Steve Kariya (Maine)
- F Marty Reasoner* (Boston College)
- D Mike Mottau (Boston College)
- D Darrel Scoville (Boston College)
- G Alfie Michaud (Maine)

* Tournament MVP(s)
