= Craig Dahl (ice hockey) =

American ice hockey coach

Current position
- Title: Volunteer assistant coach
- Team: Nazareth Golden Flyers
- Conference: UCHC

Biographical details
- Born: January 28, 1953 (age 73); Albert Lea, Minnesota, U.S.

Coaching career (HC unless noted)
- 1980–1985: Bethel (MN)
- 1985–1986: Wisconsin–River Falls
- 1986–1987: St. Cloud State (asst.)
- 1987–2005: St. Cloud State
- 2011–2017: Geneseo State (asst.)
- 2017–present: Nazareth (volunteer asst.)

Head coaching record
- Overall: 407–401–59

Accomplishments and honors

Championships
- WCHA tournament championship (2001)

Awards
- MIAC Coach of the Year (1985); WCHA Coach of the Year (1998)

Craig Dahl (born January 28, 1953) is an American ice hockey coach. He was the head coach of St. Cloud State from 1987 thru 2005. After retiring from coaching for about six years, Dahl returned to help Chris Schultz at SUNY Geneseo starting in 2011-12 and later continuied as a volunteer assistant at Nazareth.

== Career ==
Although Dahl received a football scholarship from the University of Minnesota, he transferred to and graduated from Pacific Lutheran University in 1976 with a degree in physical education and social sciences. Dahl began his coaching career a few years later when he took over the top job at Bethel College from David Harris.

Over the course of 5 seasons at the helm Dahl directed the fledgling program on an upwards trajectory, going from 3 wins in his first season to 15 in his last, including being named 1985 MIAC Coach of the Year. Dahl moved east for 1985–86, taking over at Wisconsin–River Falls before receiving the opportunity to serve under storied college coach Herb Brooks as an assistant with St. Cloud State as it was getting ready to move up to Division I.

Dahl remained as an assistant for only one season, however, as Brooks moved back to the NHL to coach the Minnesota North Stars the next year. With the Huskies playing as a D-I independent starting in 1987–88, Dahl was offered the head coaching duties and proceeded to serve in that position for the next 19 years. In only his second year, Dahl led the Huskies to their first tournament berth but lost both games against defending champion Lake Superior State in the first round. In 1991, St. Cloud joined the WCHA, giving it a much better opportunity to receive further invites to the NCAA tournament though it took over a decade for the Huskies t make their return.

Despite playing against multiple powerhouse teams throughout the 1990s, Dahl was able to keep St. Cloud's record respectable, posting 4 winning seasons and finishing with a sub-.400 mark only once (1995–96) while also making the conference tournament title game in 1994. Dahl closed out the Huskies first decade with the WCHA by leading St. Cloud to their first tournament berth in 2000. The next season Dahl led the Huskies to their first 30-win season and conference tournament championship (the only time in school for either (as of 2014)). From 2000 to 2003 Dahl brought the St. Cloud to four consecutive NCAA tournament berths but failed to win a single game.

After the 2004–05 season Dahl announced his decision to step down as head coach of St. Cloud State to pursue a career in the private sector.

While the move seemed to be an end to Dahl's coaching career he made an unexpected returned behind the bench as a volunteer assistant with SUNY Geneseo in 2011–12. Dahl stepped down in 2017 and took on a volunteer coaching role with Nazareth the same year.

== Head coaching record ==
=== Ice hockey ===
Record table
Season	Team	Overall	Conference	Standing	Postseason
Bethel Royals (MIAC) (1980–1985)
1980–81	Bethel	3–23–1	3–12–1	8th	
1981–82	Bethel	15–15–0	7–9–0	T–5th	
1982–83	Bethel	10–17–0	3–13–0	9th	
1982–83	Bethel	11–14–1	6–10–0	T–5th	
1984–85	Bethel	15–10–0	11–5–0	T–2nd	
Bethel:		54–80–2			
Wisconsin–River Falls Falcons (NCHA) (1985–1986)
1985–86	Wisconsin–River Falls	15–12–3	11–5–0	4th	NCHA Semifinals
Wisconsin–River Falls:		15–12–3			
St. Cloud State Huskies Independent (1987–1990)
1987–88	St. Cloud State	11–25–1			
1988–89	St. Cloud State	19–16–2			NCAA first round
1989–90	St. Cloud State	17–19–2			
St. Cloud State:		47–60–5			
St. Cloud State Huskies (WCHA) (1990–2005)
1990–91	St. Cloud State	18–19–4	12–16–4	t–5th	WCHA first round
1991–92	St. Cloud State	14–21–2	12–19–1	t–7th	WCHA first round
1992–93	St. Cloud State	15–18–3	14–16–2	7th	WCHA first round
1993–94	St. Cloud State	21–13–4	16–12–4	4th	WCHA Runner–Up
1994–95	St. Cloud State	17–20–1	15–16–1	t–5th	WCHA first round
1995–96	St. Cloud State	13–22–4	10–18–4	8th	WCHA Quarterfinal
1996–97	St. Cloud State	23–13–4	18–10–4	3rd	WCHA third-place game (loss)
1997–98	St. Cloud State	22–16–2	16–11–1	4th	WCHA third-place game (loss)
1998–99	St. Cloud State	16–18–5	8–16–4	7th	WCHA Quarterfinal
1999–00	St. Cloud State	23–14–3	16–9–3	3rd	NCAA East regional quarterfinals
2000–01	St. Cloud State	31–9–1	20–8–0	2nd	NCAA West regional semifinals
2001–02	St. Cloud State	29–11–2	19–7–2	2nd	NCAA West regional quarterfinals
2002–03	St. Cloud State	17–16–5	12–11–5	6th	NCAA Northeast regional semifinals
2003–04	St. Cloud State	18–16–4	12–12–4	6th	WCHA first round
2004–05	St. Cloud State	14–23–3	8–19–1	9th	WCHA first round
St. Cloud State:		291–249–47	208–200–40		
Total:		407–401–57			
National champion Postseason invitational champion Conference regular season champion Conference regular season and conference tournament champion Division regular season champion Division regular season and conference tournament champion Conference tournament champion

== See also ==
- List of college men's ice hockey coaches with 400 wins

Awards and achievements
Preceded by Dean Blais	WCHA Coach of the Year; 1997–98	Succeeded by Dean Blais
