= Mark Eaton (ice hockey) =

American ice hockey player (born 1977)

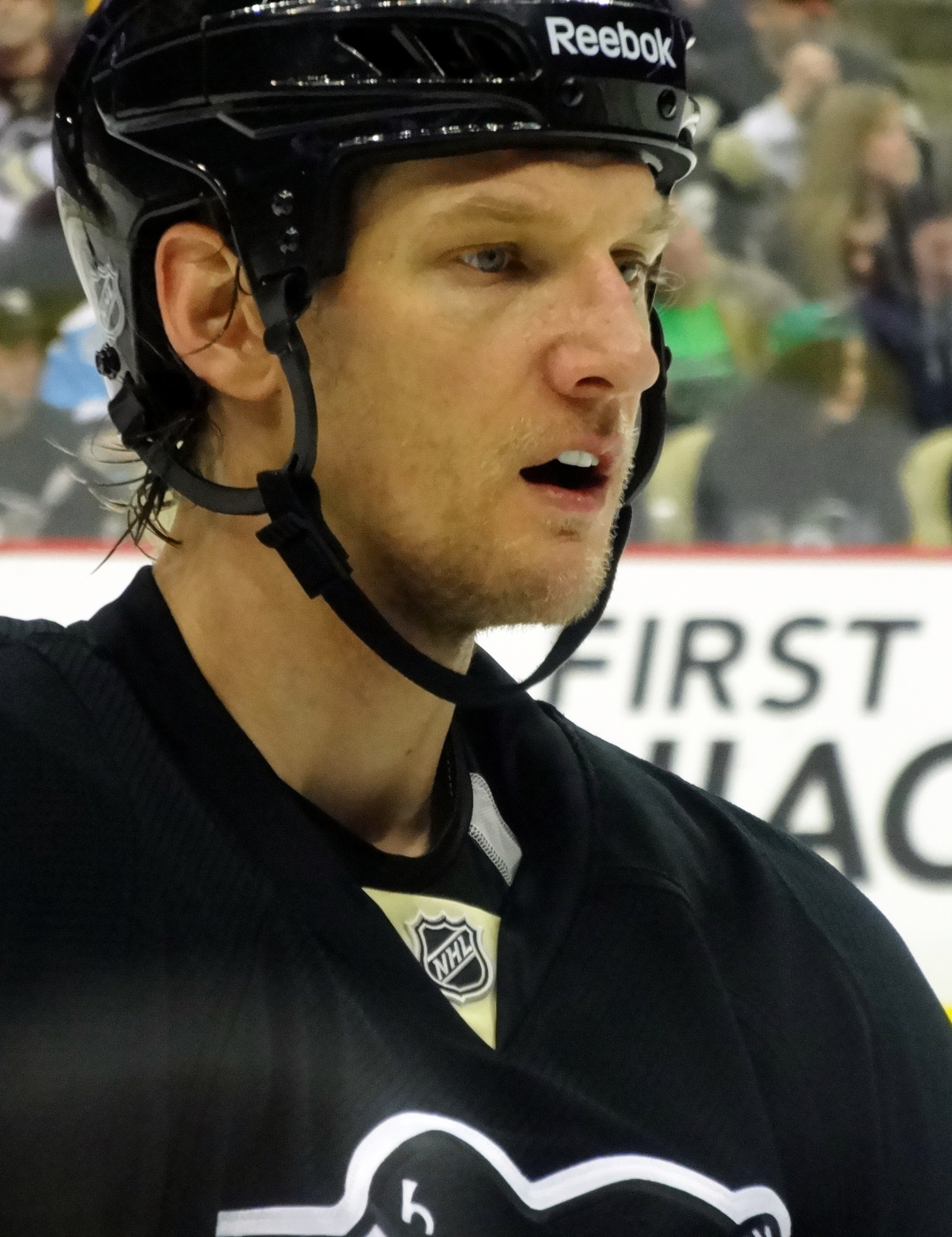
- Eaton with the Pittsburgh Penguins in 2013
- Born: May 6, 1977 (age 49) Wilmington, Delaware, U.S.
- Height: 6 ft 2 in (188 cm)
- Weight: 212 lb (96 kg; 15 st 2 lb)
- Position: Defense
- Shot: Left
- Played for: Philadelphia Flyers; Nashville Predators; Pittsburgh Penguins; New York Islanders
- National team: United States
- NHL draft: Undrafted
- Playing career: 1998–2013

Mark Andrew Eaton (born May 6, 1977) is an American professional ice hockey coach and former defenseman who was previously the interim head coach for the Rockford IceHogs of the American Hockey League (AHL). He played 13 seasons in the National Hockey League (NHL) for the Philadelphia Flyers, Nashville Predators, Pittsburgh Penguins, and New York Islanders. He is the only NHL player to ever come from Delaware. He attended John Dickinson High School in the Wilmington suburbs but played his minor hockey across the state line in Pennsylvania.

== Playing career ==
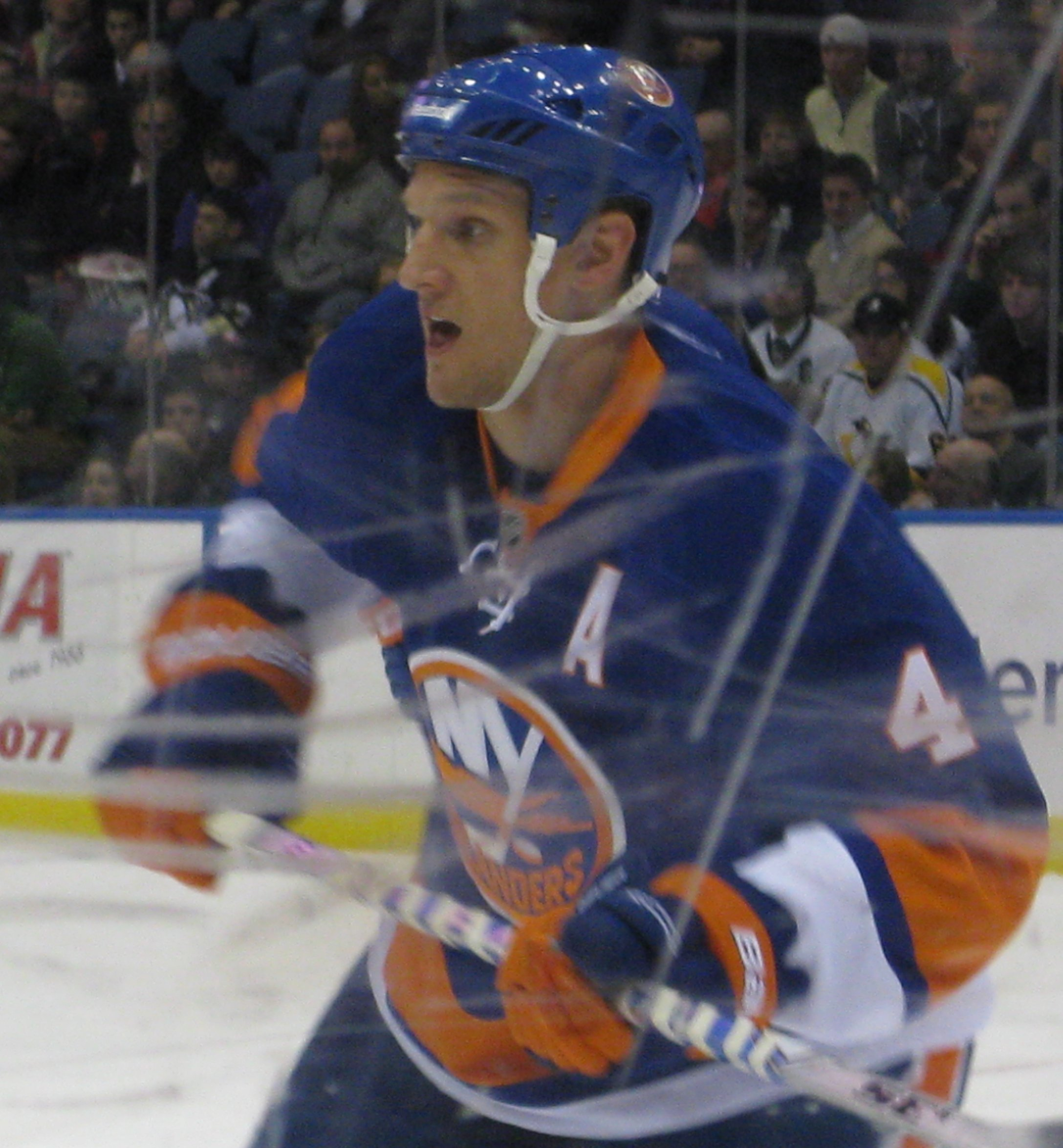
Eaton with the Islanders in 2010.

Eaton started his post-secondary competition with the Waterloo Black Hawks of the United States Hockey League (USHL). He was named second team all-USHL, was the league's third-leading scoring defenseman, and was honored with the Curt Hammer Award as the USHL's most gentlemanly player. Eaton then moved on to the University of Notre Dame of the Central Collegiate Hockey Association (CCHA). In his only season at UND, Eaton was named the CCHA Rookie of the Year after scoring 12 goals with 17 assists for 29 points.

On August 4, 1998, Eaton signed a contract with the Philadelphia Flyers as an undrafted free agent. He made his NHL debut on October 2, 1999, against the Ottawa Senators, becoming the first player from the greater Delaware Valley region to play for the Flyers. Eaton scored his first NHL goal, which was the game-winning goal, on April 8, 2000, against Rob Tallas of the Boston Bruins. He played his first NHL playoff game on April 13 against the Buffalo Sabres.

Eaton was traded from the Flyers to the Nashville Predators on September 29, 2000, for a third-round pick. While playing for the Predators in 2003–04, he set the franchise record for plus/minus at +16. He scored a career-high three assists in a 5–3 loss to the Colorado Avalanche on October 25, 2003. On March 3, 2006, the Predators placed Eaton on injured reserve with a strained knee injury.

The Pittsburgh Penguins signed Eaton on July 3, 2006, as a free agent. He saw limited time in his first two seasons, suffering with injuries, playing only 71 games between in 2006–07 and 2007–08.

He won the Stanley Cup with the Pittsburgh Penguins in 2009, scoring 4 goals in the playoffs. On March 30, 2009, Eaton was named a nominee for the Bill Masterton Trophy.

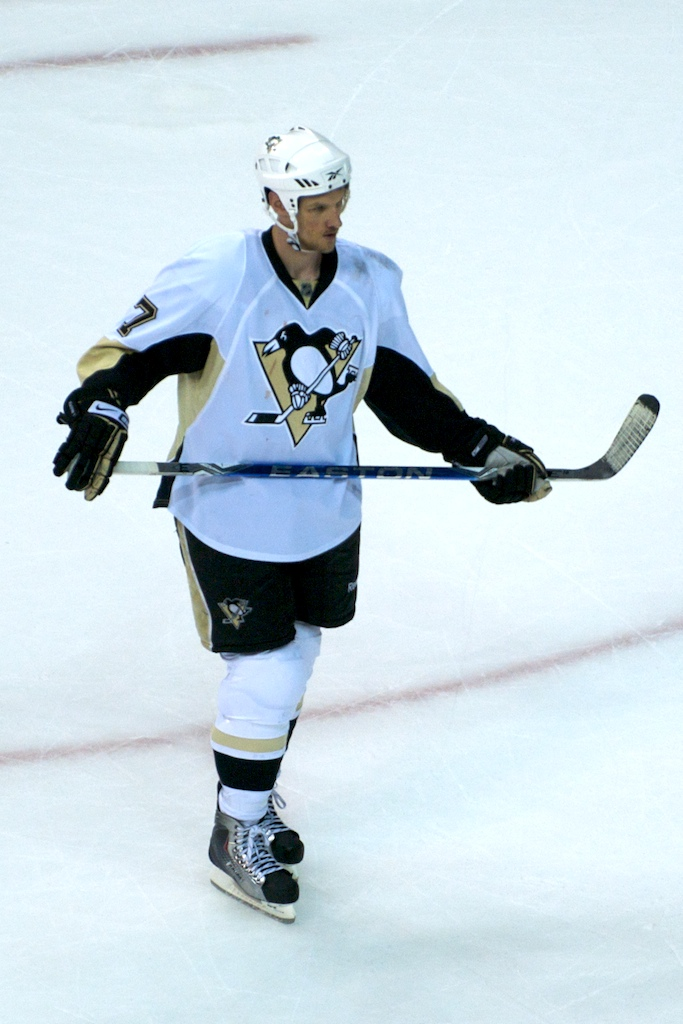
Eaton in his first stint with the Penguins in 2009.

He signed with the New York Islanders as a free agent to a two-year contract on July 2, 2010.

On January 22, 2013, the Wilkes-Barre/Scranton Penguins of the AHL announced Eaton had signed with the team on a Professional Try Out. He was released in February, and started skating with his former NHL team, the Pittsburgh Penguins. On February 25, the Penguins signed Eaton to a 1-year deal worth $725,000.

== International play ==
Eaton played for the United States at the 2001 Men's World Ice Hockey Championships and recorded one goal (the game-winner vs. Finland) and one assist in nine games. He also played for the United States at the 2002 World Championships in Sweden and registered three assists in a 5–2 win vs. Italy.

== Career statistics ==
=== Regular season and playoffs ===
			Regular season					Playoffs
Season	Team	League	GP	G	A	Pts	PIM	GP	G	A	Pts	PIM
1995–96	Waterloo Black Hawks	USHL	50	4	21	25	12	—	—	—	—	—
1996–97	Waterloo Black Hawks	USHL	50	6	32	38	62	—	—	—	—	—
1997–98	Notre Dame Fighting Irish	CCHA	41	12	17	29	32	—	—	—	—	—
1998–99	Philadelphia Phantoms	AHL	74	9	27	36	38	16	4	8	12	0
1999–2000	Philadelphia Phantoms	AHL	47	9	17	26	6	—	—	—	—	—
1999–2000	Philadelphia Flyers	NHL	27	1	1	2	8	7	0	0	0	0
2000–01	Nashville Predators	NHL	34	3	8	11	14	—	—	—	—	—
2000–01	Milwaukee Admirals	IHL	34	3	12	15	27	—	—	—	—	—
2001–02	Nashville Predators	NHL	58	3	5	8	24	—	—	—	—	—
2002–03	Milwaukee Admirals	AHL	3	1	0	1	2	—	—	—	—	—
2002–03	Nashville Predators	NHL	50	2	7	9	22	—	—	—	—	—
2003–04	Nashville Predators	NHL	75	4	9	13	26	6	0	0	0	2
2004–05	Grand Rapids Griffins	AHL	29	3	3	6	21	—	—	—	—	—
2005–06	Nashville Predators	NHL	69	3	1	4	44	5	0	0	0	8
2006–07	Pittsburgh Penguins	NHL	35	0	3	3	15	5	0	0	0	0
2007–08	Pittsburgh Penguins	NHL	36	0	3	3	4	—	—	—	—	—
2008–09	Pittsburgh Penguins	NHL	68	4	5	9	36	24	4	3	7	10
2009–10	Pittsburgh Penguins	NHL	79	3	13	16	26	13	0	3	3	4
2010–11	New York Islanders	NHL	34	0	3	3	8	—	—	—	—	—
2011–12	New York Islanders	NHL	62	1	3	4	10	—	—	—	—	—
2012–13	Wilkes–Barre/Scranton Penguins	AHL	6	0	1	1	4	—	—	—	—	—
2012–13	Pittsburgh Penguins	NHL	23	0	0	0	4	8	0	3	3	0
NHL totals			650	24	61	85	242	68	4	9	13	24

=== International ===
Year	Team	Event	Result	GP	G	A	Pts	PIM
2001	United States	WC	4th	9	1	1	2	0
2002	United States	WC	7th	7	0	3	3	4
Senior totals				16	1	4	5	4

== Awards and honors ==
Award	Year
All-CCHA Rookie Team	1997–98

- Second Team USHL All-Star in 1997
- Only the second University of Notre Dame player to be named CCHA Rookie of the Year (as selected by the conference's coaches) in 1997–98
- Won the Barry Ashbee Award in 1998–99 which is given to the Philadelphia Phantoms' top defenseman
- The first ice hockey player to be named Delaware's athlete of the year by the Delaware Sportswriters and Broadcasters Association on January 27, 2000
- Named the IHL Defenseman of the Week for the week of December 18–24, 2000
- Stanley Cup championship in 2009 (Pittsburgh)
- Inducted into the Delaware Sports Hall of Fame in 2017

Awards and achievements
Preceded by Daryl Andrews	CCHA Rookie of the Year; 1997–98	Succeeded by Mike Comrie
