= Steve Shirreffs =

American ice hockey player (born 1976)

- Born: February 18, 1976 (age 50) Bethesda, Maryland, U.S.
- Height: 6 ft 4 in (193 cm)
- Weight: 214 lb (97 kg; 15 st 4 lb)
- Position: Defence
- Shot: Left
- Played for: Princeton University; Portland Pirates; Hampton Roads Admirals; Kärpät (SM-liiga); Cleveland Barons; Reading Royals; Ässät (SM-liiga)
- NHL draft: 233rd overall, 1995; Calgary Flames
- Playing career: 2000–2004

Steve Shirreffs (born February 18, 1976) is an American former professional ice hockey forward who played for the Portland Pirates, Hampton Roads Admirals, Kärpät, Cleveland Barons, Reading Royals and Ässät. He was drafted into the National Hockey League by the Calgary Flames in the 1995 NHL entry draft. He spent his junior career with Princeton University.

Shirreffs grew up in Norwich, Vermont, and was named one of Sports Illustrated's 50 Greatest Sports Figures from Vermont in 1999.

== Awards and honors ==
Award	Year
All-ECAC Hockey First Team	1997–98
AHCA East Second-Team All-American	1997–98
ECAC Hockey All-Tournament Team	1998
All-ECAC Hockey Second Team	1998–99

== Career statistics ==
			Regular season					Playoffs
Season	Team	League	GP	G	A	Pts	PIM	GP	G	A	Pts	PIM
1994–95	Hotchkiss School	HS-Prep	—	—	—	—	—	—	—	—	—	—
1995–96	Princeton University	ECAC	26	0	3	3	6	—	—	—	—	—
1996–97	Princeton University	ECAC	34	5	4	9	12	—	—	—	—	—
1997–98	Princeton University	ECAC	36	9	24	33	54	—	—	—	—	—
1998–99	Princeton University	ECAC	27	2	17	19	39	—	—	—	—	—
1999–2000	Portland Pirates	AHL	44	3	5	8	14	—	—	—	—	—
1999–2000	Hampton Roads Admirals	ECHL	14	3	3	6	8	—	—	—	—	—
2000–01	Kärpät	SM-l	42	1	9	10	32	9	0	1	1	20
2000–01	Portland Pirates	AHL	—	—	—	—	—	2	0	0	0	2
2001–02	Cleveland Barons	AHL	9	0	2	2	0	—	—	—	—	—
2001–02	Reading Royals	ECHL	66	10	24	34	67	—	—	—	—	—
2002–03	Ässät	SM-l	43	6	12	18	54	—	—	—	—	—
2003–04	Ässät	SM-l	40	7	10	17	50	—	—	—	—	—
AHL totals			53	3	7	10	14	2	0	0	0	2
SM-l totals			125	14	31	45	136	9	0	1	1	20
