= Mike York =

American ice hockey player (born 1978)

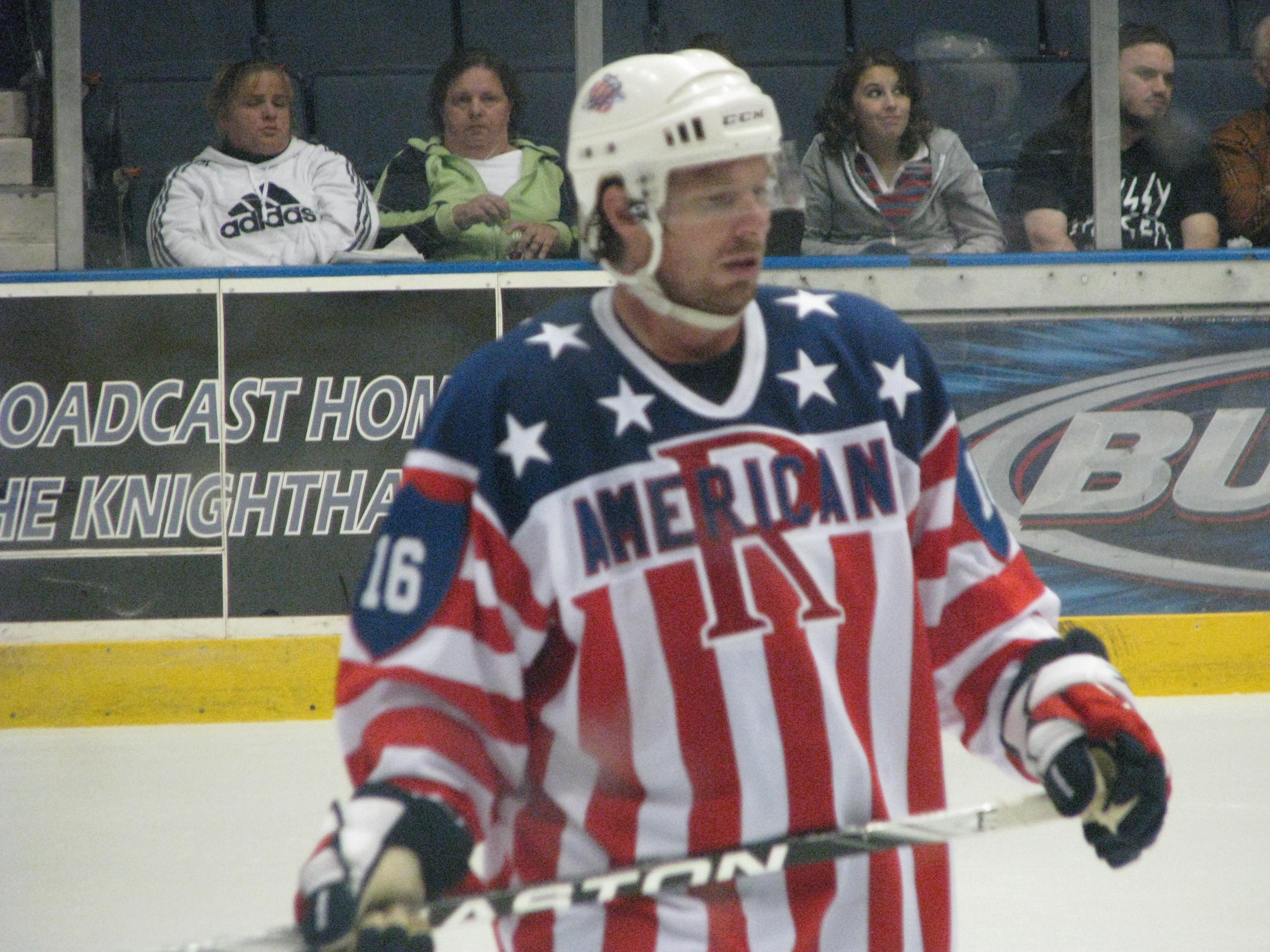
- York with the Rochester Americans in 2009
- Born: January 3, 1978 (age 48) Waterford, Michigan, U.S.
- Height: 5 ft 10 in (178 cm)
- Weight: 185 lb (84 kg; 13 st 3 lb)
- Position: Left wing
- Shot: Right
- Played for: New York Rangers; Edmonton Oilers; Iserlohn Roosters; New York Islanders; Philadelphia Flyers; Phoenix Coyotes; Columbus Blue Jackets; Lahti Pelicans
- National team: United States
- NHL draft: 136th overall, 1997; New York Rangers
- Playing career: 1999–2016
- Coaching career

Current position
- Title: Assistant coach
- Team: Lake Superior State
- Conference: WCHA

Biographical details
- Education: Michigan State University

Coaching career (HC unless noted)
- 2016–2017: Michigan State (assistant)
- 2017–Present: Lake Superior State (assistant)

Michael Allan York (born January 3, 1978) is an American former professional ice hockey left winger. He last played for and captained the Iserlohn Roosters of the Deutsche Eishockey Liga (DEL).

== Playing career ==
York was born in Waterford, Michigan. As a youth, he played in the 1991 Quebec International Pee-Wee Hockey Tournament with the Detroit Little Caesars minor ice hockey team. He later played for the Detroit Compuware Ambassadors, where he scored 136 goals in 1993–94. He attended Lutheran High School Northwest in Rochester Hills, Michigan, and from there went to Ontario where he played for the MTHL's Thornhill Islanders. It was there that he led the league in scoring and was named rookie of the year. His play in Ontario drew the attention of Michigan State University where he spent four years as a member of the Spartans hockey team. He was a Hobey Baker Memorial Award finalist and NCAA All-American in 1998 and 1999 and CCHA Player of the Year in 1999.

York was drafted in the 6th round of the 1997 NHL entry draft by the New York Rangers. During his time playing for the Rangers, York played on a line with Theoren Fleury and Eric Lindros. This was nicknamed the "FLY" line, getting its name from the last initial of each player on it. He was named to the 1999–2000 NHL All-Rookie team, scoring 26 goals during his rookie season. In 2002, York was a member of the silver medal-winning Team USA in the 2002 Winter Olympics in Salt Lake City, and played in the 52nd National Hockey League All-Star Game as a member of the North American team.

He was later dealt to the Edmonton Oilers in exchange for defenseman Tom Poti, who had become a target of fans for his perceived indifference. In Edmonton, York became an integral part of the team, playing on the top two lines and also on the penalty kill, where for a time he formed a formidable duo with Todd Marchant. In the 2004–05 season, he played in Germany for the Iserlohn Roosters in the Deutsche Eishockey Liga. He was the second best scorer in the whole league. On August 3, 2005, York was traded from the Oilers to the New York Islanders with a conditional draft pick in exchange for Michael Peca. After a season and a half with the Islanders, he was traded to the Philadelphia Flyers for Randy Robitaille and a 5th round draft pick on December 20, 2006. He signed with the Phoenix Coyotes to a 1-year, $1 million contract in the off-season.

On July 11, 2008, York signed a contract with KHL team HC Sibir Novosibirsk; he opted out of this deal on July 25, after he signed a one-year deal with the Columbus Blue Jackets. Following that season, on August 19, 2009, he signed an AHL-only contract with the Rochester Americans, allowing him to sign with any NHL team during the season. On September 10, 2010, he signed a one-year contract with the Lahti Pelicans of the Finnish Liiga.

York scored 27 points in 52 games as the Pelicans narrowly avoided relegation. On May 13, 2011, York left to sign a one-year contract returning to Germany with the Iserlohn Roosters, with whom he spent a season from the 2004 NHL lockout.

After a total of six seasons within the Roosters organization, York was not re-signed by the club following the 2015–16 season. Earning a cult status throughout his tenure in Iserlohn, it was announced that York's number 78 would be taken out of circulation, to be retired by the club at a later date. On September 2, 2016, York announced the end of his playing career, in accepting a student assistant coaching role in returning to Michigan State University to complete a communications degree.

== Career statistics ==
=== Regular season and playoffs ===
			Regular season					Playoffs
Season	Team	League	GP	G	A	Pts	PIM	GP	G	A	Pts	PIM
1993–94	Detroit Compuware	NAHL	85	136	140	276	—	—	—	—	—	—
1994–95	Thornhill Islanders	MetJHL	49	39	54	93	44	11	7	6	13	0
1995–96	Michigan State University	CCHA	39	12	27	39	20	—	—	—	—	—
1996–97	Michigan State University	CCHA	37	18	29	47	42	—	—	—	—	—
1997–98	Michigan State University	CCHA	40	27	34	61	38	—	—	—	—	—
1998–99	Michigan State University	CCHA	42	22	32	54	41	—	—	—	—	—
1998–99	Hartford Wolf Pack	AHL	3	2	2	4	0	6	3	1	4	0
1999–2000	New York Rangers	NHL	82	26	24	50	18	—	—	—	—	—
2000–01	New York Rangers	NHL	79	14	17	31	20	—	—	—	—	—
2001–02	New York Rangers	NHL	69	18	39	57	16	—	—	—	—	—
2001–02	Edmonton Oilers	NHL	12	2	2	4	0	—	—	—	—	—
2002–03	Edmonton Oilers	NHL	71	22	29	51	10	6	0	2	2	2
2003–04	Edmonton Oilers	NHL	61	16	26	42	15	—	—	—	—	—
2004–05	Iserlohn Roosters	DEL	52	16	46	62	77	—	—	—	—	—
2005–06	New York Islanders	NHL	75	13	39	52	30	—	—	—	—	—
2006–07	New York Islanders	NHL	32	6	7	13	14	—	—	—	—	—
2006–07	Philadelphia Flyers	NHL	34	4	4	8	8	—	—	—	—	—
2007–08	Phoenix Coyotes	NHL	63	6	8	14	4	—	—	—	—	—
2008–09	Syracuse Crunch	AHL	75	11	47	58	30	—	—	—	—	—
2008–09	Columbus Blue Jackets	NHL	1	0	0	0	0	—	—	—	—	—
2009–10	Rochester Americans	AHL	45	14	27	41	8	7	2	10	12	2
2010–11	Pelicans	SM-l	52	4	23	27	18	—	—	—	—	—
2011–12	Iserlohn Roosters	DEL	47	15	18	33	54	—	—	—	—	—
2012–13	Iserlohn Roosters	DEL	52	18	38	56	12	—	—	—	—	—
2013–14	Iserlohn Roosters	DEL	38	17	24	41	33	—	—	—	—	—
2014–15	Iserlohn Roosters	DEL	46	13	30	43	24	7	3	8	11	2
2015–16	Iserlohn Roosters	DEL	52	14	29	43	32	6	2	2	4	4
NHL totals			579	127	195	322	135	6	0	2	2	2
DEL totals			287	93	185	278	232	13	5	10	15	6

=== International ===
Medal record

Representing United States

Ice hockey

Winter Olympics
Silver medal – second place	2002 Salt Lake City	

World Junior Championships
Silver medal – second place	1997 Geneva	

Year	Team	Event	Result	GP	G	A	Pts	PIM
1996	United States	WJC	5th	6	1	0	1	0
1997	United States	WJC	2nd place, silver medalist(s)	6	5	5	10	4
1998	United States	WJC	5th	7	3	2	5	6
2002	United States	OG	2nd place, silver medalist(s)	6	0	1	1	0
2005	United States	WC	6th	7	0	1	1	0
Junior totals				19	9	7	16	10
Senior totals				13	0	2	2	0

== Awards and honors ==
Award	Year
CCHA Rookie Team	1995-96
CCHA Second Team	1997-98
AHCA West First-Team All-American	1997-98
CCHA All-Tournament Team	1998
CCHA Most Valuable Player in Tournament	1998
All-CCHA First Team	1998-99
CCHA Player of the Year	1998-99
CCHA Best Defensive Forward	1998-99
AHCA West First-Team All-American	1998-99
NHL All-Rookie Team	1999-00
NHL All-Star Game	2002

Awards and achievements
Preceded by Brendan Morrison	CCHA Most Valuable Player in Tournament; 1998	Succeeded by Mark Kosick
Preceded by Chad Alban	CCHA Player of the Year; 1998-99	Succeeded by Shawn Horcoff
Preceded by Terry Marchant	CCHA Best Defensive Forward; 1998-99	Succeeded by Shawn Horcoff
