= 1998 WCHA men's ice hockey tournament =

1998 WCHA Men's ice hockey tournament
- Dates: March 13–21, 1998
- Teams: 10
- Finals site: Bradley Center; Milwaukee, Wisconsin
- Champions: Wisconsin (11th title)
- Winning coach: Jeff Sauer (6th title)
- MVP: Joe Bianchi (Wisconsin)
- Attendance: 38,707
- WCHA Men's Ice Hockey Tournaments

The 1998 WCHA Men's Ice Hockey Tournament was the 39th conference playoff in league history and 46th season where a WCHA champion was crowned. The tournament was played between March 13 and March 21, 1998. First round games were played at home team campus sites while all 'Final Five' matches were held at the Bradley Center in Milwaukee, Wisconsin. By winning the tournament, Wisconsin was awarded the Broadmoor Trophy and received the WCHA's automatic bid to the 1998 NCAA Division I Men's Ice Hockey Tournament.

== Format ==
The first round of the postseason tournament featured a best-of-three games format. All nine conference teams participated in the tournament as did Mankato State which was slated to join the WCHA as a full member in two years. Teams were seeded No. 1 through No. 9 according to their final conference standing, with a tiebreaker system used to seed teams with an identical number of points accumulated while Mankato State was seeded tenth. The top five seeded teams each earned home ice and hosted one of the lower seeded teams.

The winners of the first round series advanced to the Bradley Center for the WCHA Final Five, the collective name for the quarterfinal, semifinal, and championship rounds. The Final Five uses a single-elimination format. Teams were re-seeded No. 1 through No. 5 according to the final regular season conference standings, with the top three teams automatically advancing to the semifinals and the remaining two playing in a quarterfinal game. The semifinal pitted the top remaining seed against the winner of the quarterfinal game while the two other teams that received byes were matched against one another with the winners advancing to the championship game and the losers meeting in a Third Place contest. The Tournament Champion received an automatic bid to the 1998 NCAA Division I Men's Ice Hockey Tournament.

Mankato St. was an independent, but participated in the WCHA tournament as the 10 seed.

=== Conference standings ===
Note: GP = Games played; W = Wins; L = Losses; T = Ties; PTS = Points; GF = Goals For; GA = Goals Against

1997–98 Western Collegiate Hockey Association standings
| | Conference | | | | | | | Overall | | | | | |
| | GP | W | L | T | PTS | GF | GA | GP | W | L | T | GF | GA |
|---|---|---|---|---|---|---|---|---|---|---|---|---|---|
| North Dakota† | 28 | 21 | 6 | 1 | 43 | 127 | 80 | 39 | 30 | 8 | 1 | 188 | 115 |
| Wisconsin* | 28 | 17 | 10 | 1 | 35 | 102 | 88 | 41 | 26 | 14 | 1 | 151 | 121 |
| Colorado College | 28 | 16 | 10 | 2 | 34 | 111 | 93 | 42 | 26 | 13 | 3 | 174 | 132 |
| St. Cloud State | 28 | 16 | 11 | 1 | 33 | 101 | 90 | 40 | 22 | 16 | 2 | 141 | 121 |
| Minnesota-Duluth | 28 | 14 | 12 | 2 | 30 | 94 | 90 | 40 | 21 | 17 | 2 | 140 | 130 |
| Minnesota | 28 | 12 | 16 | 0 | 24 | 101 | 94 | 39 | 17 | 22 | 0 | 140 | 133 |
| Michigan Tech | 28 | 10 | 17 | 1 | 21 | 79 | 116 | 40 | 17 | 20 | 3 | 132 | 155 |
| Denver | 28 | 8 | 18 | 2 | 18 | 91 | 119 | 38 | 11 | 25 | 2 | 127 | 167 |
| Alaska-Anchorage | 28 | 5 | 19 | 4 | 14 | 45 | 81 | 36 | 6 | 25 | 5 | 59 | 116 |
Championship: Wisconsin † indicates conference regular season champion * indicates conference tournament champion Final rankings: USA Today/American Hockey Magazine Coaches Poll Top 10 Poll

== Bracket ==
Teams are reseeded after the first round

First Round; March 13–15
1 | North Dakota | 5 | 5 | —
10 | Mankato State | 2 | 4 | —
2 | Wisconsin | 6 | 6 | —
9 | Alaska-Anchorage | 1 | 2 | —
3 | Colorado College | 3* | 6 | —
8 | Denver | 2 | 4 | —
4 | St. Cloud State | 6 | 2 | 6
7 | Michigan Tech | 4 | 3 | 2
5 | Minnesota-Duluth | 7 | 0 | 5*
6 | Minnesota | 3 | 5 | 4

Quarterfinal; March 19
4 | St. Cloud State | 4
5 | Minnesota-Duluth | 3

Semifinals; March 20
1 | North Dakota | 4
4 | St. Cloud State | 3
2 | Wisconsin | 5
3 | Colorado College | 2

Championship; March 21
1 | North Dakota | 2
2 | Wisconsin | 3

Note: * denotes overtime period(s)

=== Quarterfinals ===
==== (1) North Dakota vs. (10) Mankato State ====
| March 13 | North Dakota | 5 – 2 | Mankato State | Ralph Engelstad Arena |

| March 14 | North Dakota | 5 – 4 | Mankato State | Ralph Engelstad Arena |

| North Dakota won series 2–0 |

==== (2) Wisconsin vs. (9) Alaska-Anchorage ====
| March 13 | Wisconsin | 6 – 1 | Alaska-Anchorage | Kohl Center |

| March 14 | Wisconsin | 6 – 2 | Alaska-Anchorage | Kohl Center |

| Wisconsin won series 2–0 |

==== (3) Colorado College vs. (8) Denver ====
| March 13 | Colorado College | 3 – 2 | OT | Denver | Colorado Springs World Arena |

| March 14 | Colorado College | 6 – 4 | Denver | Colorado Springs World Arena |

| Colorado College won series 2–0 |

==== (4) St. Cloud State vs. (7) Michigan Tech ====
| March 13 | St. Cloud State | 6 – 4 | Michigan Tech | National Hockey Center |

| March 14 | St. Cloud State | 2 – 3 | Michigan Tech | National Hockey Center |

| March 15 | St. Cloud State | 6 – 2 | Michigan Tech | National Hockey Center |

| St. Cloud State won series 2–1 |

==== (5) Minnesota-Duluth vs. (6) Minnesota ====
| March 13 | Minnesota-Duluth | 7 – 3 | Minnesota | DECC |

| March 14 | Minnesota-Duluth | 0 – 5 | Minnesota | DECC |

| March 15 | Minnesota-Duluth | 5 – 4 | OT | Minnesota | DECC |

| Minnesota-Duluth won series 2–1 |

=== Quarterfinal ===
==== (4) St. Cloud State vs. (5) Minnesota-Duluth ====
| March 19 | St. Cloud State | 4 – 3 | Minnesota-Duluth | Bradley Center |

=== Semifinals ===
==== (1) North Dakota vs. (4) St. Cloud State ====
| March 20 | North Dakota | 4 – 3 | St. Cloud State | Bradley Center |

==== (2) Wisconsin vs. (3) Colorado College ====
| March 20 | Wisconsin | 5 – 2 | Colorado College | Bradley Center |

=== Third Place ===
==== (3) Colorado College vs. (4) St. Cloud State ====
| March 21 | Colorado College | 6 – 1 | St. Cloud State | Bradley Center |

=== Championship ===
==== (1) North Dakota vs. (2) Wisconsin ====
| March 21 | North Dakota | 2 – 3 | Wisconsin | Bradley Center |

== Tournament awards ==
=== All-Tournament Team ===
- F Joe Bianchi* (Wisconsin)
- F Jason Blake (North Dakota)
- F Stewart Bodtker (Colorado College)
- D Curtis Murphy (North Dakota)
- D Matt Peterson (Wisconsin)
- G Graham Melanson (Wisconsin)

* Most Valuable Player(s)

== See also ==
- Western Collegiate Hockey Association men's champions
