= Peter Smrek =

Slovak ice hockey player

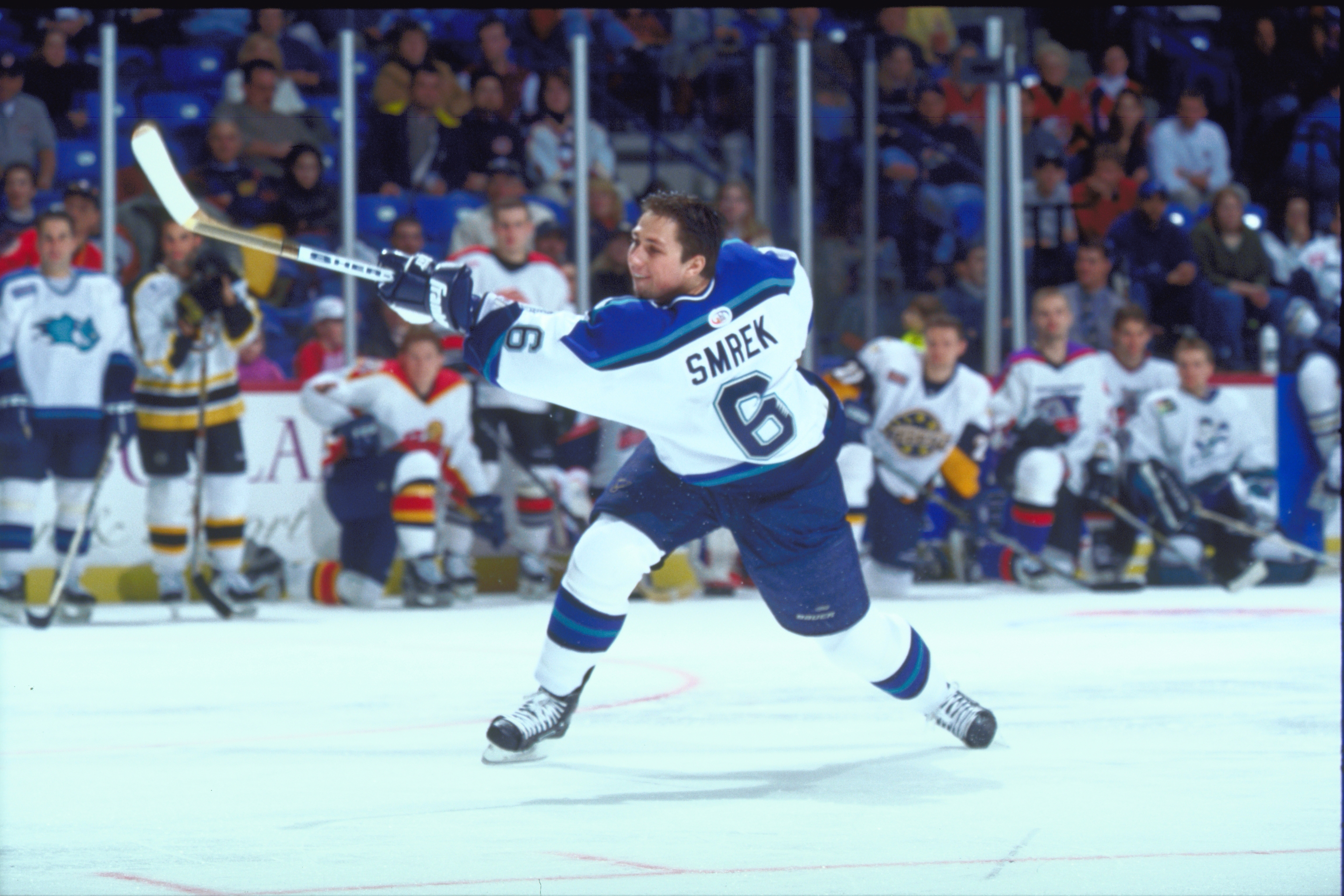
- Born: 16 February 1979 (age 47) Martin, Czechoslovakia
- Height: 6 ft 1 in (185 cm)
- Weight: 215 lb (98 kg; 15 st 5 lb)
- Position: Defence
- Shot: Left
- Played for: St. Louis Blues; New York Rangers; Grizzly Adams Wolfsburg; Mora IK; Frankfurt Lions; MHC Martin; HC Plzeň; Severstal Cherepovets
- National team: Slovakia
- NHL draft: 85th overall, 1999; St. Louis Blues
- Playing career: 2000–2010; 2013–2015

Peter Smrek (born 16 February 1979) is a Slovak former professional ice hockey defenceman who played 28 games in the National Hockey League (NHL) between the St. Louis Blues and New York Rangers.

== Playing career ==
=== Amateur ===
Smrek played for the Des Moines Buccaneers of the United States Hockey League (USHL) during the 1998–99 season and helped them win the 1999 Clark Cup Championship.

=== Professional ===
Smrek was drafted 85th overall by the St. Louis Blues in the 1999 NHL entry draft, and made his NHL debut on February 10, 2001 against the Colorado Avalanche. but only managed to play 6 games with the Blues, spending most of his time with the Blues' American Hockey League affiliate the Worcester IceCats. He was later traded to the New York Rangers and played 22 further games in the NHL, but again spent most of his spell in the AHL, this time with the Hartford Wolf Pack. He was then traded to the Nashville Predators and then to the Ottawa Senators, but never played another NHL game. In total, Smrek played 28 NHL games, scoring two goals and four assists for 6 points and collected 18 penalty minutes.

In 2004, Smrek moved to Germany and signed for the Wolfsburg Grizzly Adams where he scored 13 goals and 14 assists for 27 points and was the Grizzly Adams' top scoring defenceman. However the Grizzly Adams were relegated from the DEL and as a result, Smrek was on the move again. Smrek signed on with Mora IK of Sweden's Elitserien where he only managed to score 6 goals and 13 assists for 19 points. After one season in Sweden, Smrek returned to Germany and signed for the Frankfurt Lions. He moved on 14 October 2008 from Frankfurt Lions to Czech Extraliga club HC Lasselsberger Plzeň and then on 30 May 2009 further to Severstal Cherepovets.

After a three year hiatus from professional hockey, Smrek returned to play two seasons with hometown club, MHC Martin of the Slovak Extraliga, from the 2013–14 season.

== Career statistics ==
=== Regular season and playoffs ===
			Regular season					Playoffs
Season	Team	League	GP	G	A	Pts	PIM	GP	G	A	Pts	PIM
1997–98	MHC Martin	Slovak.20	23	0	5	5	24	—	—	—	—	—
1998–99	Des Moines Buccaneers	USHL	52	6	26	32	59	14	2	7	9	8
1999–00	Worcester IceCats	AHL	64	5	19	24	26	2	0	0	0	4
1999–00	Peoria Rivermen	ECHL	4	1	1	2	2	—	—	—	—	—
2000–01	Worcester IceCats	AHL	50	2	7	9	71	—	—	—	—	—
2000–01	St. Louis Blues	NHL	6	2	0	2	2	—	—	—	—	—
2000–01	New York Rangers	NHL	14	0	3	3	12	—	—	—	—	—
2000–01	Hartford Wolf Pack	AHL	—	—	—	—	—	5	0	2	2	2
2001–02	Hartford Wolf Pack	AHL	50	2	5	7	36	—	—	—	—	—
2001–02	New York Rangers	NHL	8	0	1	1	4	—	—	—	—	—
2001–02	Milwaukee Admirals	AHL	8	0	2	2	4	—	—	—	—	—
2002–03	Milwaukee Admirals	AHL	68	3	20	23	70	5	0	0	0	0
2003–04	Binghamton Senators	AHL	80	5	18	23	91	2	0	0	0	4
2004–05	Grizzly Adams Wolfsburg	DEL	51	13	14	27	70	—	—	—	—	—
2005–06	Mora IK	SEL	45	6	13	19	102	5	3	1	4	8
2006–07	Frankfurt Lions	DEL	26	3	4	7	140	3	0	0	0	2
2007–08	Frankfurt Lions	DEL	53	3	12	15	84	4	0	0	0	18
2008–09	MHC Martin	Slovak	4	0	0	0	8	—	—	—	—	—
2008–09	HC Plzeň	ELH	43	5	8	13	80	16	1	7	8	22
2009–10	Severstal Cherepovets	KHL	29	1	3	4	46	—	—	—	—	—
2013–14	MHC Martin	Slovak	27	3	5	8	40	—	—	—	—	—
2014–15	MHC Martin	Slovak	35	4	10	14	73	4	0	0	0	8
NHL totals			28	2	4	6	18	—	—	—	—	—

Medal record

Representing Slovakia

Ice hockey

World Championships
Gold medal – first place	2002 Sweden	

World Junior Championships
Bronze medal – third place	1999 Canada	

=== International ===
Year	Team	Event	Result	GP	G	A	Pts	PIM
1997	Slovakia	EJC18	6th	6	0	0	0	20
1999	Slovakia	WJC	3rd place, bronze medalist(s)	6	0	1	1	4
2002	Slovakia	OG	13th	4	0	0	0	0
2002	Slovakia	WC	1st place, gold medalist(s)	9	0	0	0	8
2009	Slovakia	WC	10th	6	1	0	1	6
Junior totals				12	0	1	1	24
Senior totals				19	1	0	1	14

== Awards and honours ==
Award	Year
USHL
Clark Cup (Des Moines Buccaneers)	1999
AHL
All-Star Game	2001

== Transactions ==
- March 5, 2001 - Traded by the St. Louis Blues to the New York Rangers in exchange for Alexei Gusarov
- March 19, 2002 - Traded by the New York Rangers to the Nashville Predators in exchange for Richard Lintner
- June 6, 2003 - Traded by the Nashville Predators to the Ottawa Senators in exchange for Chris Bala
