= Chris Bala =

American ice hockey player (born 1978)

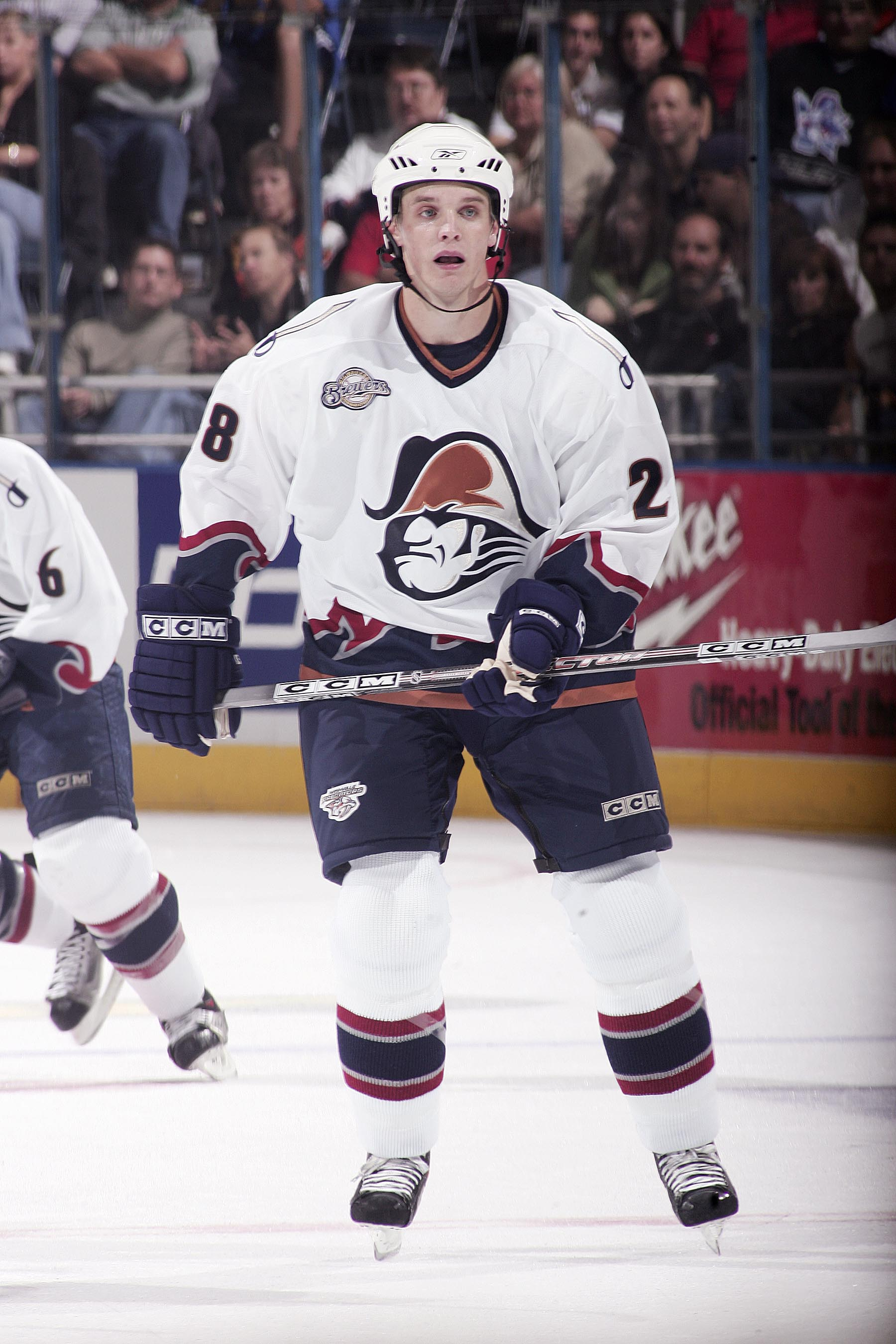
- Bala with the Milwaukee Admirals in 2005
- Born: September 24, 1978 (age 47) Alexandria, Virginia, U.S.
- Height: 6 ft 1 in (185 cm)
- Weight: 196 lb (89 kg; 14 st 0 lb)
- Position: Left wing
- Shot: Left
- Played for: Ottawa Senators
- NHL draft: 58th overall, 1998; Ottawa Senators
- Playing career: 2001–2009

Christopher B. Bala (born September 24, 1978) is an American former professional ice hockey player. He played minor hockey in Pennsylvania before being recruited by Harvard University to play college hockey. After four years with Harvard, Bala, who was drafted 58th overall by the Ottawa Senators of the National Hockey League (NHL) in the 1998 NHL entry draft, joined the Senators and appeared in six games. He then the following seasons playing for the minor league affiliates of the Senators, Minnesota Wild and Colorado Avalanche in the American Hockey League. He was named an AHL All-Star in his rookie season in the AHL. He finished his career playing for the Reading Royals of the ECHL.

== Playing career ==
Bala was born in Alexandria, Virginia, but grew up in Phoenixville, Pennsylvania, where he attended the Hill School. As a youth, he played in the 1992 Quebec International Pee-Wee Hockey Tournament with the Philadelphia Flyers minor ice hockey team. He played for four years with the Hill School before being recruited by Harvard University in 1997.

Bala was drafted 58th overall by the Ottawa Senators in the 1998 NHL entry draft and joined the Senators during the 2001–02 NHL season, playing six regular season games scoring one assist. While with Ottawa, he spent most of his time with their American Hockey League (AHL) affiliates, the Grand Rapids Griffins and Binghamton Senators. He was named to the AHL All-Star Game as a rookie in 2002. He was traded by the Senators in a three-team trade on June 26, 2003 that saw Bala go to the Minnesota Wild and defenseman Peter Smrek sent to Ottawa by the Nashville Predators. He played the majority of the following season in the AHL for the minor league affiliate of the Minnesota Wild, the Houston Aeros, before being traded to the Colorado Avalanche on March 9, 2004 for Jordan Krestanovich. He was immediately assigned to Colorado's AHL affiliate, the Hershey Bears. He then played for the Reading Royals of the ECHL.

He returned to his alma mater, the Hill School, as a varsity coach and admissions officer following his playing career.

== Career statistics ==
			Regular season					Playoffs
Season	Team	League	GP	G	A	Pts	PIM	GP	G	A	Pts	PIM
1997–98	Harvard University	ECAC	33	16	14	30	23	—	—	—	—	—
1998–99	Harvard University	ECAC	28	5	10	15	16	—	—	—	—	—
1999–00	Harvard University	ECAC	30	10	14	24	18	—	—	—	—	—
2000–01	Harvard University	ECAC	32	14	16	30	24	—	—	—	—	—
2001–02	Grand Rapids Griffins	AHL	70	21	16	37	9	4	0	1	1	0
2001–02	Ottawa Senators	NHL	6	0	1	1	0	—	—	—	—	—
2002–03	Binghamton Senators	AHL	51	6	18	24	20	14	2	5	7	4
2003–04	Houston Aeros	AHL	61	11	7	18	18	—	—	—	—	—
2003–04	Hershey Bears	AHL	13	4	2	6	0	—	—	—	—	—
2004–05	Hershey Bears	AHL	58	9	5	14	17	—	—	—	—	—
2005–06	Milwaukee Admirals	AHL	5	1	0	1	0	—	—	—	—	—
2005–06	Hershey Bears	AHL	8	0	2	2	6	—	—	—	—	—
2005–06	Reading Royals	ECHL	46	17	26	43	27	4	3	1	4	0
2006–07	Reading Royals	ECHL	58	19	28	47	28	—	—	—	—	—
2007–08	Reading Royals	ECHL	4	0	1	1	2	—	—	—	—	—
2008–09	Reading Royals	ECHL	2	0	0	0	0	—	—	—	—	—
NHL totals			6	0	1	1	0	—	—	—	—	—

== Awards and honors ==
Award	Year
College
All-ECAC Hockey Rookie Team	1998
AHL
All-Star Game	2002
