= Tyler Harlton =

Canadian ice hockey player

- Born: January 11, 1976 (age 50) Pense, Saskatchewan, Canada
- Height: 6 ft 2 in (188 cm)
- Weight: 201 lb (91 kg; 14 st 5 lb)
- Position: Defence
- Shot: Left
- Played for: AHL; Worcester IceCats; St. John's Maple Leafs; Houston Aeros; ECHL; Peoria Rivermen; CHL; Austin Ice Bats
- NHL draft: 94th overall, 1994; St. Louis Blues
- Playing career: 1998–2002

Tyler Harlton (born January 11, 1976) is a Canadian former professional ice hockey defenceman. He was selected by the St. Louis Blues in the fourth round (94th overall) of the 1994 NHL entry draft.

Harlton played 213 games in the American Hockey League where he scored 9 goals and 29 assists for 38 points, while earning 203 penalty minutes, in 213 games played.

== Career statistics ==
			Regular season					Playoffs
Season	Team	League	GP	G	A	Pts	PIM	GP	G	A	Pts	PIM
1993–94	Vernon Lakers	BCJHL	60	3	18	21	102	—	—	—	—	—
1994–95	Michigan State University	NCAA	39	1	4	5	55	—	—	—	—	—
1995–96	Michigan State University	NCAA	39	1	6	7	51	—	—	—	—	—
1996–97	Michigan State University	NCAA	39	2	9	11	75	—	—	—	—	—
1997–98	Michigan State University	NCAA	44	1	12	13	68	—	—	—	—	—
1998–99	Worcester IceCats	AHL	58	2	5	7	94	—	—	—	—	—
1998–99	Peoria Rivermen	ECHL	6	0	2	2	40	—	—	—	—	—
1999–00	Worcester IceCats	AHL	3	0	0	0	4	—	—	—	—	—
1999–00	St. John's Maple Leafs	AHL	56	2	6	8	62	—	—	—	—	—
2000–01	St. John's Maple Leafs	AHL	80	5	18	23	68	4	0	0	0	0
2001–02	Austin Ice Bats	CHL	1	0	0	0	2	—	—	—	—	—
2001–02	Houston Aeros	AHL	16	0	0	0	2	—	—	—	—	—
AHL totals			213	9	29	38	230	4	0	0	0	0

== Awards and honours ==
Award	Year
CCHA Best Defensive Defenseman	1996–97
Big Ten Conference Medal of Honor	1996–97
CCHA Best Defensive Defenseman	1997–98
All-CCHA First Team	1997–98
NCAA (West) Second All-American Team	1997–98
Big Ten Conference Medal of Honor	1997–98
CCHA All-Tournament Team	1998
