= Jeff Maund =

Canadian ice hockey player (born 1976)

- Born: April 8, 1976 (age 50) Mississauga, Ontario, Canada
- Height: 6 ft 1 in (185 cm)
- Weight: 176 lb (80 kg; 12 st 8 lb)
- Position: Goaltender
- Caught: Left
- Played for: Florida Everblades; Norfolk Admirals; Providence Bruins; Metallurg Magnitogorsk; Ritten Sport; ERC Ingolstadt; HK Riga 2000; Vienna Capitals; SG Cortina
- Playing career: 1997–2009

Jeffrey Maund (born April 8, 1976) is a Canadian former ice hockey goaltender who was an All-American for Ohio State.

== Career ==
Maund was a fairly unheralded goaltender when he arrived in Columbus but he provided an instant spark for the Ohio State hockey team. As a freshman, he put up stellar numbers, finishing as one of the top goalies in the nation while he helped the Buckeyes post their first winning season in 11 years. The team played in the conference championship game for the first time since 1972 and Maund was named as the best goaltender in the tournament. Ohio State also received its first ever NCAA Tournament bid and stunned top-seeded Michigan State in the quarterfinals to reach the Frozen Four (it would be another 20 years before the Buckeyes repeated that performance).

For an encore, Maund nearly repeated his performance over the course of the season, though Ohio State wasn't as strong offensively. Despite the lack of goal support, Maund was named an All-American and helped the Buckeyes secure the final at-large bid to the NCAA Tournament. After the season, Maund began receiving serious interest from NHL clubs. He did not come from a wealthy family, so when he was offered a contract with a $700,000 signing bonus, he couldn't turn it down.

Maund spent his first year as a professional in the ECHL, sharing the net with Marc Magliarditi but performed well and was promoted to the AHL in 2000. He continued to put up good numbers and was eventually called up to the Chicago Blackhawks in January. Maund served as Jocelyn Thibault's backup for three games before being returned to Norfolk. 10 days later, he was back with the Blackhawks, but only lasted 1 game before nominal backup Rob Tallas returned from an injury. After the season, Maund signed with the Boston Bruins but spent the entire season in Providence, backing up the highly-regarded Andrew Raycroft.

With further NHL appearances unlikely, Maund headed to Russia to play for Metallurg Magnitogorsk but the experiment did not go well. Maund played just 3 games for the club before being demoted to the third Russian league. He returned to the ECHL after the year and demonstrated that he hadn't lost his game by helping the Florida Everblades reach the Kelly Cup finals. Maund then spent the remainder of his professional career playing in Europe. He bounced around a bit before settling in as the starter for SG Cortina and backstopped the club to the Italian League championship in 2007.

Maund retired in 2009 and began working as a sales professional for AtlasCare. In his free time, he began playing senior hockey, playing in goal for the Dundas Real McCoys and helping the club win their league championship in each of his three years.

== Statistics ==
=== Regular season and playoffs ===
| | | | Regular season | | | | | | | | | Playoffs |
| Season | Team | League | GP | W | L | T | MIN | GA | SO | GAA | SV% | GP | W | L | MIN | GA | SO | GAA | SV% |
|---|---|---|---|---|---|---|---|---|---|---|---|---|---|---|---|---|---|---|---|
| 1992–93 | Toronto Red Wings (AAA) | GTHL | — | — | — | — | — | — | — | — | — | — | — | — | — | — | — | — | — |
| 1993–94 | Caledon Canadians | MetJHL | 28 | 18 | 4 | 1 | 1410 | 77 | 0 | 3.28 | — | — | — | — | — | — | — | — | — |
| 1994–95 | Richmond Hill Riot | MetJHL | 37 | — | — | — | — | — | — | — | — | — | — | — | — | — | — | — | — |
| 1995–96 | Shelburne Hornets | MetJHL | 11 | — | — | — | 538 | 49 | 1 | 5.46 | — | — | — | — | — | — | — | — | — |
| 1995–96 | Brampton Capitals | OPJHL | 19 | — | — | — | 1052 | 54 | 1 | 3.08 | — | — | — | — | — | — | — | — | — |
| 1996–97 | Aurora Tigers | MetJHL | 29 | — | — | — | 1731 | 72 | 5 | 2.50 | — | — | — | — | — | — | — | — | — |
| 1997–98 | Ohio State | CCHA | 32 | 22 | 8 | 0 | 1858 | 73 | 4 | 2.36 | .922 | — | — | — | — | — | — | — | — |
| 1998–99 | Ohio State | CCHA | 38 | 20 | 14 | 4 | 2283 | 89 | 6 | 2.34 | .921 | — | — | — | — | — | — | — | — |
| 1999–00 | Florida Everblades | ECHL | 37 | 26 | 6 | 1 | 2055 | 89 | 3 | 2.60 | .912 | 2 | — | — | — | — | — | — | — |
| 2000–01 | Norfolk Admirals | AHL | 42 | 20 | 12 | 7 | 2385 | 94 | 3 | 2.36 | .912 | 4 | — | — | — | — | — | — | — |
| 2001–02 | Providence Bruins | AHL | 26 | 10 | 12 | 2 | 1476 | 64 | 2 | 2.60 | .917 | — | — | — | — | — | — | — | — |
| 2002–03 | Metallurg Magnitogorsk | RSL | 3 | 1 | 2 | 0 | — | — | — | 3.67 | .853 | — | — | — | — | — | — | — | — |
| 2002–03 | Metallurg Magnitogorsk 2 | Russia-3 | 13 | — | — | — | — | — | — | — | — | — | — | — | — | — | — | — | — |
| 2003–04 | Florida Everblades | ECHL | 37 | 22 | 11 | 3 | 2208 | 98 | 5 | 2.66 | .918 | 8 | — | — | — | — | — | — | — |
| 2004–05 | Ritten Sport | Serie A | 30 | — | — | — | 1740 | 78 | 2 | 2.69 | .932 | 6 | — | — | — | — | — | 2.82 | .932 |
| 2005–06 | HK Riga 2000 | LHL | 4 | — | — | — | — | — | — | 2.74 | — | — | — | — | — | — | — | — | — |
| 2005–06 | Vienna Capitals | EBHL | 14 | 6 | 7 | 0 | 794 | 48 | 0 | 4.65 | .903 | — | — | — | — | — | — | — | — |
| 2005–06 | ERC Ingolstadt | DEL | 1 | 1 | 0 | 0 | 60 | 1 | 0 | 1.00 | .964 | 1 | — | — | 60 | 3 | — | 3.00 | .923 |
| 2006–07 | SG Cortina | Serie A | 32 | — | — | — | — | — | — | 2.54 | .924 | 8 | — | — | — | — | — | 2.75 | .908 |
| 2007–08 | SG Cortina | Serie A | 32 | — | — | — | 1876 | 77 | 0 | 2.46 | .926 | — | — | — | — | — | — | — | — |
| 2008–09 | SG Cortina | Serie A | 44 | — | — | — | — | — | — | 2.70 | .902 | — | — | — | — | — | — | — | — |
| 2010–11 | Dundas Real McCoys | MLH | 6 | 2 | 4 | 0 | — | — | 0 | 4.93 | .872 | 8 | 4 | 3 | — | — | 0 | 3.60 | .900 |
| 2011–12 | Dundas Real McCoys | ACH | 16 | 8 | 8 | 0 | — | — | 0 | 4.65 | .889 | 4 | 1 | 2 | — | — | 0 | 5.04 | .857 |
| 2012–13 | Dundas Real McCoys | ACH | — | — | — | — | — | — | — | — | — | 2 | 2 | 0 | — | — | 0 | 4.50 | .857 |
| NCAA totals | | | 70 | 42 | 22 | 4 | 4,141 | 162 | 10 | 2.35 | .921 | — | — | — | — | — | — | — | — |
| ECHL totals | | | 74 | 48 | 17 | 4 | 4,263 | 187 | 8 | 2.63 | .915 | — | — | — | — | — | — | — | — |
| AHL totals | | | 68 | 30 | 24 | 9 | 3,861 | 158 | 5 | 2.46 | .914 | — | — | — | — | — | — | — | — |

== Awards and honors ==
| Award | Year |
|---|---|
| All-CCHA Rookie Team | 1997–98 |
| CCHA All-Tournament Team | 1998 |
| All-CCHA First Team | 1998–99 |
| AHCA East Second-Team All-American | 1998–99 |
