= Derek Bekar =

Canadian businessman and ice hockey player

- Born: September 15, 1975 (age 50) Burnaby, British Columbia, Canada
- Height: 6 ft 2 in (188 cm)
- Weight: 200 lb (91 kg; 14 st 4 lb)
- Position: Centre
- Shot: Left
- Played for: St. Louis Blues; Los Angeles Kings; New York Islanders; EHC Basel; Hannover Scorpions; HK Acroni Jesenice
- NHL draft: 205th overall, 1995; St. Louis Blues
- Playing career: 1998–2010

Derek Bekar (born September 15, 1975) is a Canadian businessman and former professional ice hockey player. Bekar was born in Burnaby, British Columbia.

== Playing career ==
He played a total of 11 games for the St. Louis Blues, Los Angeles Kings, and the New York Islanders, scoring no points. He was drafted 205th overall by the Blues in the 1995 NHL entry draft. He also had spells in Switzerland's Nationalliga A for EHC Basel and in the Deutsche Eishockey Liga in Germany for the Hannover Scorpions and HK Acroni Jesenice of the Austrian Hockey League. He also played briefly in the United Kingdom, playing three games in the British National League with the Dundee Stars.

On February 1, 2009. he moved from Springfield Falcons, who play in the American Hockey League to Lausanne Hockey Club of the Nationalliga B, before finishing his professional career with HYS The Hague in the Netherlands.

Since March 2009 he has been a senior vice president at Glacial Energy.

== Career statistics ==
			Regular season					Playoffs
Season	Team	League	GP	G	A	Pts	PIM	GP	G	A	Pts	PIM
1992–93	Notre Dame Hounds AAA	SMHL	29	25	24	49	68	—	—	—	—	—
1993–94	Notre Dame Hounds	SJHL	62	20	31	51	77	—	—	—	—	—
1994–95	Powell River Paper Kings	BCHL	46	33	29	62	35	—	—	—	—	—
1995–96	University of New Hampshire	HE	34	15	18	33	4	—	—	—	—	—
1996–97	University of New Hampshire	HE	39	18	21	39	34	—	—	—	—	—
1997–98	University of New Hampshire	HE	35	32	28	60	46	—	—	—	—	—
1998–99	Worcester IceCats	AHL	51	16	20	36	6	4	0	0	0	0
1999–2000	St. Louis Blues	NHL	1	0	0	0	0	—	—	—	—	—
1999–2000	Worcester IceCats	AHL	71	21	19	40	26	7	0	3	3	2
2000–01	Worcester IceCats	AHL	18	5	2	7	10	—	—	—	—	—
2000–01	Portland Pirates	AHL	58	19	16	35	49	3	0	0	0	0
2001–02	Manchester Monarchs	AHL	74	27	20	47	42	5	1	4	5	2
2002–03	Los Angeles Kings	NHL	6	0	0	0	4	—	—	—	—	—
2002–03	Manchester Monarchs	AHL	51	19	19	38	49	3	0	0	0	2
2003–04	New York Islanders	NHL	4	0	0	0	0	—	—	—	—	—
2003–04	Bridgeport Sound Tigers	AHL	76	24	11	35	57	3	2	2	4	0
2004–05	Dundee Stars	GBR.2	3	2	1	3	4	—	—	—	—	—
2004–05	Springfield Falcons	AHL	51	8	14	22	22	—	—	—	—	—
2005–06	EHC Basel	NLA	10	5	2	7	8	5	2	3	5	0
2005–06	EHC Chur	SUI.2	30	25	18	43	22	—	—	—	—	—
2006–07	Hannover Scorpions	DEL	50	11	10	21	44	6	1	1	2	4
2007–08	HK Acroni Jesenice	AUT	36	9	21	30	22	5	3	1	4	4
2007–08	HK Acroni Jesenice	SVN	—	—	—	—	—	8	3	2	5	4
2008–09	Springfield Falcons	AHL	40	9	5	14	12	—	—	—	—	—
2008–09	Lausanne HC	SUI.2	—	—	—	—	—	9	2	10	12	4
2009–10	HYS The Hague	NED	27	15	17	32	37	5	1	1	2	24
AHL totals			490	148	126	274	273	25	3	9	12	6
NHL totals			11	0	0	0	4	—	—	—	—	—

== Awards and honors ==
Award	Year
All-Hockey East Rookie Team	1995–96
All-Hockey East Second Team	1997–98
