= 1997–98 NCAA Division I men's ice hockey season =

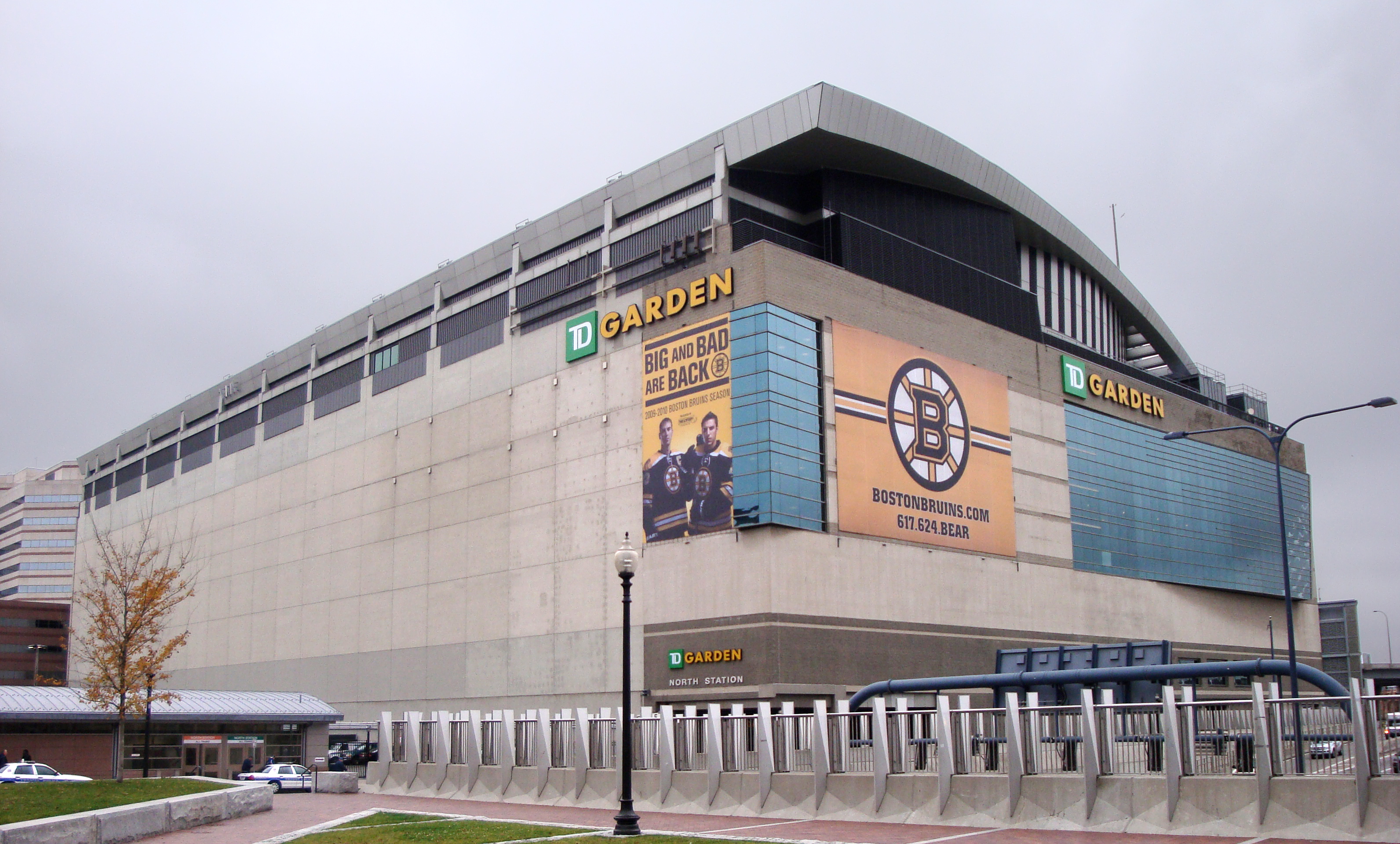
- The Fleet Center served as the host for the 1998 Frozen Four
- Duration: October 1997– April 4, 1998
- NCAA tournament: 1998
- National championship: FleetCenter; Boston, Massachusetts
- NCAA champion: Michigan
- Hobey Baker Award: Chris Drury (Boston University)

The 1997–98 NCAA Division I men's ice hockey season began in October 1997 and concluded with the 1998 NCAA Division I men's ice hockey tournament's championship game on April 4, 1998, at the FleetCenter in Boston, Massachusetts. This was the 51st season in which an NCAA ice hockey championship was held and is the 104th year overall where an NCAA school fielded a team.

== Season Outlook ==
=== Pre-season polls ===
The top teams in the nation as ranked before the start of the season.

The WMPL Baker's Dozen poll was voted on by coaches. The WMEB poll was voted on by media. The U.S. College Hockey Online poll was voted on by coaches, media, and NHL scouts. The USA Today/American Hockey Magazine poll was voted on by coaches and media.

This was the 16th and last season for the WMEB poll, which started as the College Hockey Statistics Bureau/WDOM poll.

WMPL Poll
Rank	Team
1	North Dakota (5)
2	Boston University (2)
3	Colorado College (1)
4	Michigan State
5	Maine
6	Miami (1)
7	New Hampshire (1)
8	Michigan
9	Minnesota
10	Wisconsin
11 (tie)	Cornell
11 (tie)	Colgate
13	Boston College

WMEB Poll
Rank	Team
1	North Dakota (8)
2	Michigan State (1)
3	Boston University (1)
4	Colorado College
5 (tie)	Maine
5 (tie)	New Hampshire
7	Michigan
8	Minnesota
9	Miami
10	Colgate

USCHO Poll
Rank	Team
1	North Dakota (30)
2	Boston University
3	Michigan State
4	Minnesota
5	Colorado College
6	New Hampshire
7	Maine
8	Miami
9	Michigan
10	Rensselaer

USA Today Poll
Rank	Team
1	North Dakota
2	Michigan State
3	Boston University
4	Colorado College
5	Maine
6	New Hampshire
7	Miami
8	Michigan
9	Minnesota
10	Colgate

== Regular season ==
=== Season tournaments ===
Tournament	Dates	Teams	Champion
JCPenney Classic	October 24–25	4	Colorado College
Governor's Cup	November 28–29	4	New Hampshire
PAL Tournament	November 28–29	4	Army
College Hockey Showcase	November 28–30	4	
Badger Showdown	December 27–28	4	Wisconsin
Mariucci Classic	December 27–28	4	Northeastern
Denver Cup	December 27–28	4	Miami
Great Lakes Invitational	December 27–28	4	Michigan State
Pepsi Cola Tournament	December 27–28	4	North Dakota
Syracuse Invitational	December 27–28	4	Minnesota–Duluth
Rensselaer Holiday Tournament	December 29–30	4	Lake Superior State
Sheraton/USAir Hockey Classic	December 29–30	4	Dartmouth
Saskatoon Chill Out	January 2–3	4	Northeastern
Beanpot	February 2, 9	4	Boston University

=== Standings ===
1997–98 Central Collegiate Hockey Association standings
	Conference							Overall					
	GP	W	L	T	PTS	GF	GA	GP	W	L	T	GF	GA
Michigan State†*	30	21	5	4	46	110	54	44	33	6	5	156	76
Michigan	30	22	7	1	45	109	69	46	34	11	1	163	108
Ohio State	30	19	10	1	39	106	76	42	27	13	2	161	110
Northern Michigan	30	15	12	3	33	96	90	38	19	15	4	130	117
Miami	30	14	12	4	32	100	87	37	19	14	4	134	114
Lake Superior State	30	12	14	4	28	82	100	37	15	18	4	104	121
Notre Dame	30	12	14	4	28	91	89	41	18	19	4	127	115
Ferris State	30	12	15	3	27	88	106	39	15	21	3	119	138
Western Michigan	30	9	19	2	20	80	91	38	10	25	3	94	125
Alaska-Fairbanks	30	7	20	3	17	87	138	35	10	21	4	110	154
Bowling Green	30	6	21	3	15	77	106	38	8	27	3	100	157
Championship: Michigan State † indicates conference regular season champion * indicates conference tournament champion Final rankings: USA Today/American Hockey Magazine Coaches Poll Top 10 Poll

1997–98 ECAC Hockey standings
	Conference							Overall					
	GP	W	L	T	PTS	GF	GA	GP	W	L	T	GF	GA
Yale†	22	17	4	1	35	82	44	35	23	9	3	121	80
Clarkson	22	16	4	2	34	86	48	35	23	9	3	128	87
Rensselaer	22	11	7	4	26	87	75	35	18	13	4	126	110
Brown	22	11	9	2	24	73	64	31	13	16	2	100	104
Harvard	22	10	11	1	21	72	78	33	14	17	2	112	124
Colgate	22	9	10	3	21	69	75	35	16	15	4	116	126
Princeton*	22	7	9	6	20	71	75	36	18	11	7	125	112
Cornell	22	9	12	1	19	55	68	33	15	16	2	84	101
Vermont	22	7	11	4	18	62	77	34	10	20	4	89	119
St. Lawrence	22	8	12	2	18	56	69	33	9	20	4	90	123
Dartmouth	22	7	12	3	17	72	77	29	11	13	5	96	88
Union	22	4	15	3	11	42	76	32	6	22	4	74	117
Championship: Princeton † indicates conference regular season champion * indicates conference tournament champion (Whitelaw Cup); Final rankings: USA Today/American Hockey Magazine Coaches Poll Top 10 Poll

1997–98 Hockey East standings
	Conference							Overall					
	GP	W	L	T	PTS	GF	GA	GP	W	L	T	GF	GA
Boston University†	24	18	4	2	38	95	52	38	28	8	2	155	86
Boston College*	24	15	5	4	34	107	78	42	28	9	5	191	123
New Hampshire	24	15	8	1	31	104	62	38	25	12	1	163	102
Northeastern	24	13	8	3	29	77	78	39	21	15	3	125	133
Massachusetts–Lowell	24	11	10	3	25	88	89	36	16	17	3	126	124
Maine	24	10	11	3	23	98	89	36	17	15	4	145	121
Providence	24	9	13	2	20	65	82	36	15	18	3	110	125
Merrimack	24	4	20	0	8	78	128	38	11	26	1	141	185
Massachusetts	24	3	19	2	8	62	116	33	6	24	3	78	141
Championship: Boston College † indicates conference regular season champion * indicates conference tournament champion Final rankings: USA Today/American Hockey Magazine Coaches Poll Top 10 Poll

1997–98 NCAA Division I Independent ice hockey standings
	Conference							Overall					
	GP	W	L	T	PTS	GF	GA	GP	W	L	T	GF	GA
Air Force	0	0	0	0	-	-	-	34	15	19	0		
Army	0	0	0	0	-	-	-	34	18	15	1		
Mankato State	0	0	0	0	-	-	-	38	15	17	6	139	138
Nebraska–Omaha	0	0	0	0	-	-	-	33	12	18	3		
Final rankings: USA Today/American Hockey Magazine Coaches Poll Top 10 Poll

1997–98 Western Collegiate Hockey Association standings
	Conference							Overall					
	GP	W	L	T	PTS	GF	GA	GP	W	L	T	GF	GA
North Dakota†	28	21	6	1	43	127	80	39	30	8	1	188	115
Wisconsin*	28	17	10	1	35	102	88	41	26	14	1	151	121
Colorado College	28	16	10	2	34	111	93	42	26	13	3	174	132
St. Cloud State	28	16	11	1	33	101	90	40	22	16	2	141	121
Minnesota-Duluth	28	14	12	2	30	94	90	40	21	17	2	140	130
Minnesota	28	12	16	0	24	101	94	39	17	22	0	140	133
Michigan Tech	28	10	17	1	21	79	116	40	17	20	3	132	155
Denver	28	8	18	2	18	91	119	38	11	25	2	127	167
Alaska-Anchorage	28	5	19	4	14	45	81	36	6	25	5	59	116
Championship: Wisconsin † indicates conference regular season champion * indicates conference tournament champion Final rankings: USA Today/American Hockey Magazine Coaches Poll Top 10 Poll

=== Final regular season polls ===
The WMEB poll was released before the conference tournaments. The USA Today and USCHO polls were released before the conference tournament finals.

WMEB Media Poll
Ranking	Team
1	North Dakota (5)
2	Michigan State (1)
3	Boston University
4	New Hampshire
5	Michigan
6	Yale
7	Boston College
8	Clarkson
9	Ohio State
10	St. Cloud State

USA Today / American Hockey Magazine Poll
Ranking	Team
1	Michigan State (10)
2	North Dakota
3	Boston College
4	Boston University
5	Michigan
6	Wisconsin
7	Ohio State
8	Clarkson
9	Colorado College
10	New Hampshire

USCHO Poll
Ranking	Team
1	North Dakota (20)
2	Michigan State (10)
3	Boston College
4	Boston University
5	Michigan
6	Clarkson
7	Yale
8	Ohio State
9	Colorado College
10	Wisconsin

== 1998 NCAA tournament ==
Regional Quarterfinals; March 27–28
E1	Boston University	–
–	bye	–
East Regional
E4	Wisconsin	4
E5	New Hampshire	7
W2	North Dakota	–
–	bye	–
West Regional
W3	Michigan	2
W6	Princeton	1
W1	Michigan State	–
–	bye	–
West Regional
W4	Ohio State	4
W5	Yale	0
E2	Boston College	–
–	bye	–
East Regional
E3	Clarkson	1
E6	Colorado College	3

Regional semifinals March 28–29
E1	Boston University	3
E5	New Hampshire	4
W2	North Dakota	3
W3	Michigan	4
W1	Michigan State	3
W4	Ohio State	4
E2	Boston College	6
E6	Colorado College	1

Frozen Four; April 2
E5	New Hampshire	0
W3	Michigan	4
W4	Ohio State	2
E2	Boston College	5

National championship April 4
W3	Michigan	3*
E2	Boston College	2

Note: * denotes overtime period(s)

== Player stats ==
=== Scoring leaders ===
The following players led the league in points at the conclusion of the season.

GP = Games played; G = Goals; A = Assists; Pts = Points; PIM = Penalty minutes

Player	Class	Team	GP	G	A	Pts	PIM
Marty Reasoner	Junior	Boston College	42	33	40	73	56
Bill Muckalt	Senior	Michigan	46	32	35	67	94
Jason Krog	Junior	New Hampshire	38	33	33	66	44
Brian Gionta	Freshman	Boston College	40	30	32	62	44
Mike York	Senior	Michigan State	40	27	34	61	38
Derek Bekar	Junior	New Hampshire	35	32	28	60	46
Tom Nolan	Senior	New Hampshire	37	18	41	59	73
Hugo Boisvert	Sophomore	Ohio State	42	23	35	58	70
Chris Drury	Senior	Boston University	38	28	29	57	88
Rejean Stringer	Junior	Merrimack	38	11	46	57	44

=== Leading goaltenders ===
The following goaltenders led the league in goals against average at the end of the regular season while playing at least 33% of their team's total minutes.

GP = Games played; Min = Minutes played; W = Wins; L = Losses; OT = Overtime/shootout losses; GA = Goals against; SO = Shutouts; SV% = Save percentage; GAA = Goals against average

Player	Class	Team	GP	Min	W	L	OT	GA	SO	SV%	GAA
Chad Alban	Senior	Michigan State	40	2438	31	4	5	64	6	.926	1.57
Tom Noble	Senior	Boston University	16	930	11	4	1	33	3	.907	2.13
Marty Turco	Senior	Michigan	45	2640	33	10	1	95	4	.907	2.16
Michel Larocque	Junior	Boston University	24	1370	17	4	1	50	1	.912	2.19
Karl Goehring	Freshman	North Dakota	27	1504	23	3	1	57	1	.913	2.27
Dan Murphy	Senior	Clarkson	23	1266	10	9	2	48	2	.907	2.27
Alex Westlund	Junior	Yale	32	1918	20	9	3	74	3	.919	2.32
Jeff Maund	Freshman	Ohio State	32	1858	22	8	0	73	0	.922	2.36
Chris Bernard	Senior	Clarkson	16	864	13	0	1	35	0	.899	2.43
Sean Matile	Junior	New Hampshire	38	2282	25	12	1	96	4	.908	2.52

== Awards ==
=== NCAA ===
Award		Recipient
Hobey Baker Memorial Award		Chris Drury, Boston University
Spencer T. Penrose Award		Tim Taylor, Yale
Most Outstanding Player in NCAA Tournament		Marty Turco, Michigan
AHCA All-American Teams
East First Team	Position	West First Team
Marc Robitaille, Northeastern	G	Chad Alban, Michigan State
Ray Giroux, Yale	D	Dan Boyle, Miami
Tom Poti, Boston University	D	Curtis Murphy, North Dakota
Chris Drury, Boston University	F	Hugo Boisvert, Ohio State
Mark Mowers, New Hampshire	F	Bill Muckalt, Michigan
Marty Reasoner, Boston College	F	Mike York, Michigan State
East Second Team	Position	West Second Team
Alex Westlund, Yale	G	Karl Goehring, North Dakota
Chris Kelleher, Boston University	D	Calvin Elfring, Colorado College
Mike Mottau, Boston College	D	Tyler Harlton, Michigan State
Steve Shirreffs, Princeton	D	
Brian Gionta, Boston College	F	Sean Berens, Michigan State
Jeff Hamilton, Yale	F	Jason Blake, North Dakota
Eric Healey, Rensselaer	F	Brian Swanson, Colorado College

=== CCHA ===
Awards		Recipient
Player of the Year		Chad Alban, Michigan State
Best Defensive Forward		Terry Marchant, Lake Superior State
Best Defensive Defenseman		Tyler Harlton, Michigan State
Best Offensive Defenseman		Dan Boyle, Miami
Rookie of the Year		Mark Eaton, Notre Dame
Coach of the Year		John Markell, Ohio State
Terry Flanagan Memorial Award		Bryan Adams, Michigan State
Most Valuable Player in Tournament		Mike York, Michigan State
All-CCHA Teams
First Team	Position	Second Team
Chad Alban, Michigan State	G	Marty Turco, Michigan
Tyler Harlton, Michigan State	D	Bubba Berenzweig, Michigan
Dan Boyle, Miami	D	Brett Colborne, Ferris State
Hugo Boisvert, Ohio State	F	Mike York, Michigan State
Bill Muckalt, Michigan	F	Terry Marchant, Lake Superior State
Sean Berens, Michigan State	F	Bobby Hayes, Michigan
Rookie Team	Position	
Jeff Maund, Ohio State	G	
Mark Eaton, Notre Dame	D	
Mike Van Ryn, Michigan	D	
Rustyn Dolyny, Michigan State	F	
Mark Kosick, Michigan	F	
Kevin Swider, Ferris State	F	

=== ECAC ===
Award		Recipient
Player of the Year		Ray Giroux, Yale
Rookie of the Year		Erik Cole, Clarkson
		Willie Mitchell, Clarkson
Coach of the Year		Tim Taylor, Yale
Best Defensive Defenseman		Ray Giroux, Yale
Best Defensive Forward		Buddy Wallace, Clarkson
Ken Dryden Award		Alex Westlund, Yale
Most Outstanding Player in Tournament		Jeff Halpern, Princeton
All-ECAC Hockey Teams
First Team	Position	Second Team
Alex Westlund, Yale	G	Jason Elliott, Cornell
Ray Giroux, Yale	D	Willie Mitchell, Clarkson
Steve Shirreffs, Princeton	D	Jimmy Andersson, Brown
Eric Healey, Rensselaer	F	Paul DiFrancesco, St. Lawrence
Damian Prescott, Brown	F	Jeff Halpern, Princeton
Jeff Hamilton, Yale	F	Chris Clark, Clarkson
Rookie Team	Position	
Andrew Allen, Vermont	G	
Cory Murphy, Colgate	D	
Andreas Moborg, Vermont	D	
Willie Mitchell, Clarkson	D	
Denis Ladouceur, Cornell	F	
Steve Moore, Harvard	F	
Erik Cole, Clarkson	F	
Chris Bala, Harvard	F	

=== Hockey East ===
Award		Recipient
Player of the Year		Chris Drury, Boston University
Rookie of the Year		Brian Gionta, Boston College
Bob Kullen Coach of the Year Award		Bruce Crowder, Northeastern
Len Ceglarski Sportsmanship Award		Steve Kariya, Maine
Best Defensive Forward		Chris Drury, Boston University
William Flynn Tournament Most Valuable Player		Marty Reasoner, Boston College
All-Hockey East Teams
First Team	Position	Second Team
Marc Robitaille, Northeastern	G	Michel Larocque, Boston University
Mike Mottau, Boston College	D	Chris Kelleher, Boston University
Tom Poti, Boston University	D	Mike Nicholishen, Massachusetts-Lowell
Chris Drury, Boston University	F	Derek Bekar, New Hampshire
Jason Krog, New Hampshire	F	Brian Gionta, Boston College
Marty Reasoner, Boston College	F	Mark Mowers, New Hampshire
Rookie Team	Position	
Boyd Ballard, Providence	G	
Scott Clemmensen, Boston College	G	
Bobby Allen, Boston College	D	
Rob Scuderi, Boston College	D	
Carl Corazzini, Boston University	F	
Brian Cummings, Northeastern	F	
Brian Gionta, Boston College	F	
Matthias Trattnig, Maine	F	

=== WCHA ===
Award		Recipient
Player of the Year		Curtis Murphy North Dakota
Defensive Player of the Year		Matt Henderson, North Dakota
		Andy Sutton, Michigan Tech
Rookie of the Year		Karl Goehring, North Dakota
Student-Athlete of the Year		Mitch Vig, North Dakota
Coach of the Year		Craig Dahl, St. Cloud State
Most Valuable Player in Tournament		Joe Bianchi, Wisconsin
All-WCHA Teams
First Team	Position	Second Team
Karl Goehring, North Dakota	G	Brian Leitza, St. Cloud State
Craig Anderson, Wisconsin	D	Calvin Elfring, Colorado College
Curtis Murphy, North Dakota	D	Andy Sutton, Michigan Tech
Brian Swanson, Colorado College	F	Steven Reinprecht, Wisconsin
Jason Blake, North Dakota	F	Reggie Berg, Minnesota
Andre Savage, Michigan Tech	F	David Hoogsteen, North Dakota
Third Team	Position	Rookie Team
Doug Taskey, Alaska-Anchorage	G	Karl Goehring, North Dakota
Josh DeWolf, St. Cloud State	D	Trevor Hammer, North Dakota
Scott Swanson, Colorado College	D	Ryan Coole, Minnesota-Duluth
	D	Paul Manning, Colorado College
Mike Peluso, Minnesota-Duluth	F	Kevin Granato, Wisconsin
Wyatt Smith, Minnesota	F	Mark Rycroft, Denver
Paul Comrie, Denver	F	Jeff Panzer, North Dakota

== 1998 NHL entry draft ==
Round	Pick	Player	College	Conference	NHL team
1	26	Mike Van Ryn	Michigan	CCHA	New Jersey Devils
2	52	Bobby Allen	Boston College	Hockey East	Boston Bruins
2	53	Steve Moore	Harvard	ECAC Hockey	Colorado Avalanche
2	58	Chris Bala	Harvard	ECAC Hockey	Ottawa Senators
3	61	Joe DiPenta	Boston University	Hockey East	Florida Panthers
3	62	Paul Manning	Colorado College	WCHA	Calgary Flames
3	68	Jarkko Ruutu ^{‡}	Michigan Tech	WCHA	Vancouver Canucks
3	71	Erik Cole	Clarkson	ECAC Hockey	Carolina Hurricanes
3	73	Pat O'Leary ^{†}	Minnesota	WCHA	Phoenix Coyotes
3	77	Mike Pandolfo ^{†}	Boston University	Hockey East	Toronto Maple Leafs
3	81	Justin Morrison	Colorado College	WCHA	Vancouver Canucks
3	82	Brian Gionta	Boston College	Hockey East	New Jersey Devils
3	85	Geoff Koch	Michigan	CCHA	Nashville Predators
4	88	Kent Sauer ^{†}	Minnesota–Duluth	WCHA	Nashville Predators
4	94	Matthias Trattnig	Maine	Hockey East	Chicago Blackhawks
4	99	Shawn Horcoff	Michigan State	CCHA	Edmonton Oilers
4	107	Chris Corrinet	Princeton	ECAC Hockey	Washington Capitals
5	115	Jay Leach	Providence	Hockey East	Phoenix Coyotes
5	116	Josh Blackburn ^{†}	Michigan	CCHA	Phoenix Coyotes
5	122	Pat Leahy	Miami	CCHA	New York Rangers
5	125	Erik Wendell ^{†}	Minnesota	WCHA	Washington Capitals
5	134	Rob Scuderi	Boston College	Hockey East	Pittsburgh Penguins
6	149	Paul Cabana ^{†}	Michigan Tech	WCHA	Vancouver Canucks
6	155	Kevin Clauson	Western Michigan	CCHA	New York Islanders
6	156	Kent Huskins	Clarkson	ECAC Hockey	Chicago Blackhawks
7	178	Jesse Fibiger	Minnesota–Duluth	WCHA	Mighty Ducks of Anaheim
7	183	Tyler Arnason ^{†}	St. Cloud State	WCHA	Chicago Blackhawks
7	184	Don Smith	Clarkson	ECAC Hockey	Carolina Hurricanes
7	186	Mike Morrison ^{†}	Maine	Hockey East	Edmonton Oilers
7	187	Erik Westrum	Minnesota	WCHA	Phoenix Coyotes
7	199	Erik Jensen ^{†}	Wisconsin	WCHA	New Jersey Devils
7	200	Scott Perry ^{†}	Boston University	Hockey East	Dallas Stars
8	201	Craig Murray ^{†}	Michigan	CCHA	Montreal Canadiens
8	204	Graig Mischler	Northeastern	Hockey East	Vancouver Canucks
8	212	Jim Fahey ^{†}	Northeastern	Hockey East	San Jose Sharks
8	217	Jim Henkel ^{†}	Rensselaer	ECAC Hockey	Los Angeles Kings
8	219	Curtis Valentine ^{†}	Bowling Green	CCHA	Vancouver Canucks
8	220	Mike Farrell	Providence	Hockey East	Washington Capitals
8	221	Mark Kosick	Michigan	CCHA	Carolina Hurricanes
9	237	Ben Blais	St. Lawrence	ECAC Hockey	New York Islanders
9	244	Toby Petersen	Colorado College	WCHA	Pittsburgh Penguins
9	248	Matthew Yeats ^{†}	Maine	Hockey East	Los Angeles Kings
9	254	Matt Hussey ^{†}	Wisconsin	WCHA	Pittsburgh Penguins
9	255	John Pohl ^{†}	Minnesota	WCHA	St. Louis Blues

† incoming freshman
‡ Ruutu had left school two years prior.

== See also ==
- 1997–98 NCAA Division II men's ice hockey season
- 1997–98 NCAA Division III men's ice hockey season
