= 1998 CCHA men's ice hockey tournament =

Sports tournament

1998 CCHA Men's ice hockey tournament
- Dates: March 13–21, 1998
- Teams: 8
- Finals site: Joe Louis Arena; Detroit, Michigan
- Champions: Michigan State (8th title)
- Winning coach: Ron Mason (11th title)
- MVP: Mike York (Michigan State)
- CCHA Men's Ice Hockey Tournaments

The 1998 CCHA Men's Ice Hockey Tournament was the 27th CCHA Men's Ice Hockey Tournament. It was played between March 13 and March 21, 1998. Opening round games were played at campus sites, while all 'final four' games were played at Joe Louis Arena in Detroit, Michigan. By winning the tournament, Michigan State received the Central Collegiate Hockey Association's automatic bid to the 1998 NCAA Division I Men's Ice Hockey Tournament.

== Format ==
The tournament featured three rounds of play. The three teams that finish below eighth place in the standings were not eligible for postseason play. In the quarterfinals, the first and eighth seeds, the second and seventh seeds, the third seed and sixth seeds and the fourth seed and fifth seeds played a best-of-three series, with the winners advancing to the semifinals. In the semifinals, the remaining highest and lowest seeds and second highest and second lowest seeds play a single-game, with the winners advancing to the finals. The tournament champion receives an automatic bid to the 1998 NCAA Division I Men's Ice Hockey Tournament.

== Conference standings ==
Note: GP = Games played; W = Wins; L = Losses; T = Ties; PTS = Points; GF = Goals For; GA = Goals Against

1997–98 Central Collegiate Hockey Association standings
	Conference							Overall					
	GP	W	L	T	PTS	GF	GA	GP	W	L	T	GF	GA
Michigan State†*	30	21	5	4	46	110	54	44	33	6	5	156	76
Michigan	30	22	7	1	45	109	69	46	34	11	1	163	108
Ohio State	30	19	10	1	39	106	76	42	27	13	2	161	110
Northern Michigan	30	15	12	3	33	96	90	38	19	15	4	130	117
Miami	30	14	12	4	32	100	87	37	19	14	4	134	114
Lake Superior State	30	12	14	4	28	82	100	37	15	18	4	104	121
Notre Dame	30	12	14	4	28	91	89	41	18	19	4	127	115
Ferris State	30	12	15	3	27	88	106	39	15	21	3	119	138
Western Michigan	30	9	19	2	20	80	91	38	10	25	3	94	125
Alaska-Fairbanks	30	7	20	3	17	87	138	35	10	21	4	110	154
Bowling Green	30	6	21	3	15	77	106	38	8	27	3	100	157
Championship: Michigan State † indicates conference regular season champion * indicates conference tournament champion Final rankings: USA Today/American Hockey Magazine Coaches Poll Top 10 Poll

== Bracket ==
Quarterfinals; March 13–15
1	Michigan State	3	2	–
8	Ferris State	1	1	–
2	Michigan	2	2*	4
7	Notre Dame	4	1	3
(Pairings are reseeded after the first round)
3	Ohio State	2	6	–
6	Lake Superior State	1	0	–
4	Northern Michigan	3	8	–
5	Miami	1	2	–

Semifinals; March 19
1	Michigan State	5
4	Northern Michigan	1
2	Michigan	2
3	Ohio State	4

Championship; March 21
1	Michigan State	3**
3	Ohio State	2

Note: * denotes overtime period(s)

=== Quarterfinals ===
==== (1) Michigan State vs. (8) Ferris State ====
Michigan State	3 – 1	Ferris State	Munn Ice Arena

Michigan State	2 – 1	Ferris State	Munn Ice Arena

Michigan State won series 2–0

==== (2) Michigan vs. (7) Notre Dame ====
Michigan	2 – 4	Notre Dame	Yost Ice Arena

Michigan	2 – 1	OT	Notre Dame	Yost Ice Arena

Michigan	4 – 3	Notre Dame	Yost Ice Arena

Michigan won series 2–1

==== (3) Ohio State vs. (6) Lake Superior State ====
Ohio State	2 – 1	Lake Superior State	OSU Ice Rink

Ohio State	6 – 0	Lake Superior State	OSU Ice Rink

Ohio State won series 2–0

==== (4) Northern Michigan vs. (5) Miami ====
Northern Michigan	3 – 1	Miami	Lakeview Arena

Northern Michigan	8 – 2	Miami	Lakeview Arena

Northern Michigan won series 2–0

=== Semifinals ===
==== (1) Michigan State vs. (4) Northern Michigan ====
March 19	Michigan State	5 – 1	Northern Michigan	Joe Louis Arena

==== (2) Michigan vs. (3) Ohio State ====
March 19	Michigan	2 – 4	Ohio State	Joe Louis Arena

=== Championship ===
==== (1) Michigan State vs. (3) Ohio State ====
March 21	Michigan State	3 – 2	2OT	Ohio State	Joe Louis Arena

== Tournament awards ==
=== All-Tournament Team ===
- F Mike York* (Michigan State)
- F Chris Richards (Ohio State)
- F Todd Compeau (Ohio State)
- D Tyler Harlton (Michigan State)
- D Ryan Root (Ohio State)
- G Jeff Maund (Ohio State)

* Most Valuable Player(s)
