= 1997–98 NCAA Division I men's ice hockey rankings =

- NCAA tournament: 1998
- NCAA champion: Michigan
- NCAA Division I men's ice hockey rankings

Two human polls made up the 1997–98 NCAA Division I men's ice hockey rankings, the USA Today/USA Hockey Magazine poll and the USCHO.com poll.

== Legend ==
	Increase in ranking
	Decrease in ranking
	Not ranked previous week
Italics	Number of first place votes
(#-#)	Win–loss–tie record
т	Tied with team above or below also with this symbol

== USA Today ==
	Week 1 Oct 20	Week 2 Oct 27	Week 3 Nov 3	Week 4 Nov 10	Week 5 Nov 17	Week 6 Nov 24	Week 7 Dec 1	Week 8 Dec 8	Week 9 Dec 15	Week 10 Jan 6	Week 11 Jan 13	Week 12 Jan 20	Week 13 Jan 27	Week 14 Feb 2	Week 15 Feb 9	Week 16 Feb 16	Week 17 Feb 23	Week 18 Mar 2	Week 19 Mar 9	Final Mar 16	
1.	North Dakota (0–0–0)	North Dakota (0–0–0)	North Dakota (1–1–0)	Boston University (4–0–0)	Michigan State (6–1–2) (6)	Michigan State (9–1–2) (7)	Michigan State (6)	Boston University	Boston University (8)	Boston University (12–2–2) (7)	Michigan State (16–3–3) (4)	North Dakota (16–3–1)	Michigan State (21–3–3) (6)	Michigan State (20–3–5) (10)	North Dakota (21–4–1) (6)	North Dakota (22–4–1) (10)	North Dakota (24–4–1)	Michigan State (26–4–5) (7)	Boston University (27–5–2) (7)	Michigan State (10)	1.
2.	Michigan State (1–0–1)	Michigan State (2–0–1)	Colorado College (3–0–1)	North Dakota (2–1–1)	Boston University (5–1–0)	Boston University (5–1–0) (2)	Boston University (3)	Michigan State	Michigan State (2)	Michigan State (15–3–1) (2)	North Dakota (14–3–1) (5)	Michigan State (18–3–3)	North Dakota (17–4–1) (2)	North Dakota (19–4–1)	Boston University (19–4–2) (3)	Michigan State (22–4–5)	Michigan State (24–4–5)	North Dakota (26–5–1) (3)	Michigan State (27–5–5) (2)	North Dakota	2.
3.	Boston University (1–0–0)	Boston University (2–0–0)	Boston University (3–0–0)	Michigan State (5–1–1)	North Dakota (3–2–1) (3)	North Dakota (5–2–1)	North Dakota	North Dakota	North Dakota	North Dakota (12–3–1) (1)	Boston University (13–3–2)	New Hampshire (16–4–1)	New Hampshire (16–4–1) (1)	Boston University (17–4–2)	Michigan State (20–4–5) (1)	New Hampshire (21–5–1)	Boston University (23–4–2)	Boston University (25–5–2)	North Dakota (27–6–1) (1)	Boston College	3.
4.	Colorado College (0–0–0)	Colorado College (1–0–1)	Maine (3–1–1)	Colorado College (3–1–2)	Miami (7–1–0) (1)	Miami (9–1–0) (1)	Miami (1)	New Hampshire	New Hampshire	Miami (14–3–1)	New Hampshire (14–4–1)	Boston University (14–4–2)	Boston University (16–4–2) (1)	New Hampshire (18–5–1)	New Hampshire (19–5–1)	Boston University (21–4–2)	New Hampshire (22–6–1)	New Hampshire (22–8–1)	Michigan (28–9–1)	Boston University	4.
5.	Maine (1–1–0)	New Hampshire (3–0–0)	New Hampshire (4–0–0)	Maine (3–2–1)	New Hampshire (6–3–0)	Wisconsin (7–1–0)	New Hampshire	Miami	Colorado College	New Hampshire (14–4–1)	Michigan (19–4–1) (1)	Michigan (20–4–1)	Miami (17–5–2)	Wisconsin (19–6–1)	Yale (17–4–0)	Yale (19–4–0)	Michigan (25–8–1)	Michigan (26–9–1)	Yale (22–6–1)	Michigan	5.
6.	New Hampshire (1–0–0)	Maine (1–1–1)	Michigan State (4–1–1)	Boston College (6–2–0)	Boston College (6–2–0)	New Hampshire (8–3–0)	Colorado College	Michigan	Miami	St. Cloud State (12–4–2)	St. Cloud State (14–4–2)	Boston College (14–6–3)	Boston College (15–6–3)	Yale (15–4–0)	Michigan (23–6–1)	Michigan (25–6–1)	Boston College (19–8–4)	Boston College (20–8–4)	Boston College (22–8–5)	Wisconsin	6.
7.	Miami (1–0–0)	Miami (4–0–0)	Miami (6–0–0)	Miami (7–1–0)	Cornell (4–0–1)	Colorado College (5–3–2)	Michigan	Colorado College	Michigan	Michigan (17–4–1)	Miami (14–4–2)	Yale (13–4–0)	Wisconsin (17–6–1)	Miami (17–6–3)	Miami (18–6–4)	Boston College (19–8–4)	Yale (20–5–0)	Yale (20–6–1)	New Hampshire (23–9–1)	Ohio State	7.
8.	Michigan (2–1–0)	Minnesota (2–2–0)	Michigan (5–2–0)	New Hampshire (6–3–0)	Maine (4–3–1)	Boston College (8–3–0)	St. Cloud State	St. Cloud State	St. Cloud State	Colorado College (11–5–2)	Yale (12–4–0)	Miami (15–5–2)	St. Cloud State (15–7–2)	Michigan (22–6–1)	Wisconsin (19–8–1)	St. Cloud State (18–8–2)	Clarkson (16–7–3)	Clarkson (18–7–3)	Clarkson (20–7–3)	Clarkson	8.
9.	Minnesota (1–1–0)	Boston College (2–0–0)	Minnesota (3–3–0)	Renssealer (5–2–0)	Wisconsin (5–1–0)	Michigan (9–3–1)	Boston College	Boston College	Boston College	Yale (11–3–0)	Boston College (12–6–3)	Wisconsin (15–6–1)	Yale (14–4–0)	Boston College (16–7–3)	Boston College (16–8–4)	Miami (18–8–4)	Wisconsin (20–11–1)	Wisconsin (21–12–1)	Ohio State (22–11–2)	Colorado College	9.
10.	Colgate (1–1–0)	Michigan (2–2–0)	Colgate (3–1–0)	Cornell (4–0–1)	Rensselaer (5–2–0)	Cornell (5–1–1)	Cornell	Providence	Providence	Northeastern (12–5–2)	Wisconsin (13–6–1)	St. Cloud State (14–6–2)	Michigan (20–6–1)	St. Cloud State (16–8–2)	St. Cloud State (16–8–2)	Wisconsin (20–9–1)		Ohio State (20–11–2)	Colorado College (22–11–3)	New Hampshire	10.
	Week 1 Oct 20	Week 2 Oct 27	Week 3 Nov 3	Week 4 Nov 10	Week 5 Nov 17	Week 6 Nov 24	Week 7 Dec 1	Week 8 Dec 8	Week 9 Dec 15	Week 10 Jan 6	Week 11 Jan 13	Week 12 Jan 20	Week 13 Jan 27	Week 14 Feb 2	Week 15 Feb 9	Week 16 Feb 16	Week 17 Feb 23	Week 18 Mar 2	Week 19 Mar 9	Final Mar 16	
		Dropped: Colgate	Dropped: Boston College	Dropped: Colgate; Michigan; Minnesota	Dropped: Colorado College	Dropped: Maine; Rensselaer	None	None	None	None	Dropped: Colorado College; Northeastern	None	None	None	None	None	None	None	Dropped: Wisconsin	None	

== USCHO.com ==
	Week 1 Oct 20	Week 2 Oct 27	Week 3 Nov 3	Week 4 Nov 10	Week 5 Nov 17	Week 6 Nov 24	Week 7 Dec 1	Week 8 Dec 8	Week 9 Dec 15	Week 10 Jan 6	Week 11 Jan 13	Week 12 Jan 20	Week 13 Jan 27	Week 14 Feb 2	Week 15 Feb 9	Week 16 Feb 16	Week 17 Feb 23	Week 18 Mar 2	Week 19 Mar 9	Week 20 Mar 16	Final Mar 23	
1.	North Dakota (0–0–0) (30)	North Dakota (0–0–0) (27)	North Dakota (1-1-0) (12)	North Dakota (2-1-1) (19)	Michigan State (7-1-2)	Michigan State (9–1–2) (20)	Michigan State (13-1-2) (23)	Boston University (11-1-0) (20)	Boston University (11-1-2) (22)	Boston University (12–2–2) (9)	North Dakota (14–3–1) (22)	North Dakota (16–3–1)	Michigan State (21–3–3) (17)	Michigan State (20–3–5) (22)	North Dakota (21–4–1)	North Dakota (22–4–1) (29)	North Dakota (24–4–1)	Michigan State (26–4–5) (21)	North Dakota (27-6-1) (14)	North Dakota (29-6-1) (20)		1.
2.	Michigan State (1–0–1)	Michigan State (2–0–1) (3)	Colorado College (3-0-1) (4)	Boston University (4-0-0) (10)	Boston University (4-1)	Boston University (6–1–0) (4)	Boston University (9-1-0) (3)	Michigan State (12-2-2) (5)	Michigan State (12-2-2) (4)	North Dakota (12–3–1) (13)	Michigan State (16–3–3) (4)	Michigan State (18–3–3)	North Dakota (17–4–1) (9)	North Dakota (19–4–1) (8)	Boston University (19–4–2)	Michigan State (22–4–5)	Michigan State (24–4–5)	North Dakota (26–5–1) (9)	Boston University (27-5-2) (10)	Michigan State (29-5-5) (10)		2.
3.	Boston University (1–0–0)	Boston University (1–0–0)	Boston University (3-0-0) (8)	Michigan State (5-1-2) (1)	North Dakota (3-2-1)	North Dakota (5–2–1) (6)	North Dakota (5–2–1) (4)	North Dakota (7-2-1) (5)	New Hampshire (12-3-1)	Michigan State (15–3–1) (5)	Boston University (13–3–2) (2)	New Hampshire (16–4–1)	Boston University (16–4–2)	Boston University (17–4–2)	Michigan State (20–4–5)	New Hampshire (21–5–1)	Boston University (23–4–2)	Boston University (25–5–2)	Michigan State (27-5-5) (6)	Boston College (24-8-5)		3.
4.	New Hampshire (1–0–0)	Colorado College (0–0–0)	Michigan State (4-1-2)	Colorado College (3-1-2)	Miami (7-1-0)	Miami (9–1–0)	Miami (9-1-0)	New Hampshire (12-3-0)	North Dakota (8-3-1) (3)	Miami (14–3–1)	New Hampshire (14–4–1)	Michigan (20–4–1)	New Hampshire (16–4–1) (4)	New Hampshire (18–5–1)	New Hampshire (19–5–1)	Boston University (21–4–2)	New Hampshire (22–6–1)	Michigan (26–9–1)	Michigan (27-9-1)	Boston University (28-7-2)		4.
5.	Colorado College (0–0–0)	New Hampshire (3–0–0)	New Hampshire (4-0-0) (4)	Miami (6-1-0)	New Hampshire (6-3-0)	New Hampshire (8–3–0)	New Hampshire (10-3-0)	Miami (10-2-0)	Michigan (13-3-1)	New Hampshire (14–4–1) (2)	Michigan (19–4–1) (1)	Boston University (14–4–2)	Miami (17–5–2)	Wisconsin (19–6–1)	Michigan (23–6–1)	Michigan (24–6–1) (1)	Michigan (25–8–1)	Boston College (20–8–4)	Boston College (22-8-5)	Michigan (29-10-1)		5.
6.	Maine (1–1–0)	Maine (1–1–1)	Maine (4-1-1)	Maine (4-2-1)	Cornell (4-0-1)	Wisconsin (7–1–0)	Colorado College (7-3-2)	Colorado College (8-4-2)	Miami (11-3-0)	Michigan (17–4–1)	St. Cloud State (14–4–2)	Boston College (14–6–3)	Wisconsin (17–6–1)	Michigan (22–6–1)	Yale (17–4–0)	Yale (19–4–0)	Yale (20–5–0)	New Hampshire (22–8–1)	Yale (22-6-1)	Clarkson (22-7-3)		6.
7.	Miami (1–0–0)	Miami (4–0–0)	Miami (6-0-0) (2)	Cornell (3-0-0) т	Colorado College (3-3-2)	Colorado College (5–3–2)	Michigan (10-3-1)	Michigan (11-3-1)	St. Cloud State (10-4-2) (1)	St. Cloud State (12–4–2) (1)	Miami (14–4–2)	Miami (15–5–2)	Michigan (20–6–1)	Miami (17–6–3)	Miami (18–6–4)	St. Cloud State (18–8–2)	Boston College (19–8–4)	Yale (20–6–1)	New Hampshire (23-9-1)	Yale (23-6-1)		7.
8.	Michigan (2–1–0)	Michigan (2–2–0)	Michigan (4-2-0)	New Hampshire (5-2-0) т	Boston College (7-2-0)	Boston College (8–3–0)	Boston College (10-4-0)	St. Cloud State (9-3-2)	Colorado College (10-4-2)	Colorado College (11–5–2)	Wisconsin (13–6–1)	Wisconsin (15–6–1)	Boston College (15–6–3)	Boston College (16–7–3)	Wisconsin (19–8–1)	Boston College (19–8–4)	St. Cloud State (18–10–2)	Clarkson (18–7–3)	Clarkson (20-7-3)	Ohio State (24-11-2)		8.
9.	Minnesota (1–1–0)	Minnesota (2–2–0)	Minnesota (3-3-0)	Boston College (5-1-0)	Maine (5-3-1)	Cornell (5–1–1)	Cornell (6-1-1)	Yale (8-2-1)	Yale (8-2)	Yale (11–3–0)	Yale (12–4–0)	Yale (13–4–0)	St. Cloud State (15–7–2)	Yale (15–4–0)	St. Cloud State (16–8–2)	Miami (18–8–4)	Clarkson (16–7–3)	Wisconsin (21–12–1)	Ohio State (22-11-2)	Colorado College (24-11-3)		9.
10.	Cornell (0–0–0)	Clarkson (0–0–0)	Cornell (1-0-0)	Michigan (5-3-0)	Wisconsin (5-1-0)	Maine (6–4–1)	St. Cloud State (9–3–2)	Providence (10-3-1)	Boston College (10-5-1)	Northeastern (12–5–2)	Boston College (12–6–3)	St. Cloud State (14–6–2)	Yale (14–4–0)	St. Cloud State (16–8–2)	Boston College (16–8–4)	Wisconsin (20–9–1)	Wisconsin (20–11–1)	Ohio State (20–11–2)	Wisconsin (22-13-1)	Wisconsin (24-13-1)		10.
	Week 1 Oct 20	Week 2 Oct 27	Week 3 Nov 3	Week 4 Nov 10	Week 5 Nov 17	Week 6 Nov 24	Week 7 Dec 1	Week 8 Dec 8	Week 9 Dec 15	Week 10 Jan 6	Week 11 Jan 13	Week 12 Jan 20	Week 13 Jan 27	Week 14 Feb 2	Week 15 Feb 9	Week 16 Feb 16	Week 17 Feb 23	Week 18 Mar 2	Week 19 Mar 9	Week 20 Mar 16	Final Mar 23	
		Dropped: Cornell	Dropped: Clarkson	Dropped: Minnesota	Dropped: Michigan	None	Dropped: Maine; Wisconsin	Dropped: Boston College; Cornell	Dropped: Providence	Dropped: Boston College	Dropped: Colorado College; Northeastern	None	None	None	None	None	Dropped: Miami	Dropped: St. Cloud State	None	Dropped: New Hampshire	None	
