= 1997–98 Michigan Wolverines men's ice hockey season =

Collegiate Hockey team

NCAA Division I National Champion NCAA Tournament, champion
- Conference: CCHA
- Home ice: Yost Ice Arena

Rankings
- USA Today: 5

Record
- Overall: 34–11–1
- Conference: 22–7–1
- Home: 16–4–0
- Road: 12–4–0
- Neutral: 6–3–1

Coaches and captains
- Head coach: Red Berenson
- Assistant coaches: Mel Pearson; Billy Powers
- Captain: Matt Herr
- Alternate captain(s): Bill Muckalt; Marty Turco

The 1997–98 Michigan Wolverines men's ice hockey team represented the University of Michigan in intercollegiate college ice hockey during the 1997–98 NCAA Division I men's ice hockey season. The head coach was Red Berenson and the team captain was Matt Herr. The team played its home games in the Yost Ice Arena on the university campus in Ann Arbor, Michigan. The team finished second in the Central Collegiate Hockey Association regular season, lost in the semifinals of the CCHA Tournament and won the 1998 NCAA Division I Men's Ice Hockey Tournament.

== Season ==
The team was led by Bill Muckalt who was a Division I All-Americans selection of the American Hockey Coaches Association. Muckalt was the only first team Central Collegiate Hockey Association All-Conference selection.

Marty Turco set the current career (1995–98) win (127) and shutouts (15) records. His wins total is an NCAA Division I national record: The team established the current NCAA Division I record for single-season overtime wins (6). Muckalt led the conference in game-winning goals (6) and was the team's highest ranked scorer with 43 points which was second in the league.

The team concluded the Central Collegiate Hockey Association 30-game regular season one point behind the 21–5–4 conference championship Michigan State team with a 22–7–1 record. In the first round, number two seeded Michigan defeated Notre Dame in a three-game series by scores of 2–4, 2–1 (overtime) and 4–3. In the second round, the team lost to number three Ohio State 4–2.

In the 12-team 1998 NCAA Division I Men's Ice Hockey Tournament as the number three seed in the west, the team posted the following victories en route to the championship: Princeton University 2–1, North Dakota 4–3, New Hampshire 4–0 and Boston College 3–2 in overtime. Marty Turco set Frozen Four career records with 9 wins and 2 career shutouts, which have both been eclipsed. Scott Clemmensen has totalled 10 career tournament victories in a career ending in 2001 for Boston College, while Cory Schneider compiled three tournament shutouts for Boston College in a career that ended in 2007.

== Departures ==
Player	Position	Nationality	Cause
Craig Assenmacher	Forward	United States	Left program
Jason Botterill	Forward	Canada	Graduation (signed with Dallas Stars)
Peter Bourke	Defenseman	United States	Graduation (retired)
Chris Frescoln	Defenseman	United States	Graduation (retired)
Mike Legg	Forward	United States	Graduation (signed with HIFK Hockey)
Warren Luhning	Forward	Canada	Graduation (signed with New York Islanders)
John Madden	Forward	Canada	Graduation (signed with New Jersey Devils)
Harold Schock	Defenseman	United States	Graduation (Signed with Jacksonville Lizard Kings)
Blake Sloan	Forward	United States	Graduation (Signed with Dallas Stars)

== Recruiting ==
Player	Position	Nationality	Age	Notes
Krikor Arman	Forward	United States	19	West Bloomfield, Michigan
Bob Gassoff	Defenseman	United States	20	St. Louis, Missouri
David Huntzicker	Forward	United States	21	Ann Arbor, Michigan
Troy Kahler	Forward	Canada	18	Toronto
Geoff Koch	Forward	United States	18	Exeter, New Hampshire; selected 85th overall in 1998
Mark Kosick	Forward	Canada	18	Victoria, BC; selected 211th overall in 1998
Josh Langfeld	Forward	United States	20	Fridley, Minnesota; selected 66th overall in 1997
Scott Matzka	Forward	United States	19	Port Huron, Michigan
Bill Trainor	Forward	United States	21	Canton, Michigan
Mike Van Ryn	Defenseman	Canada	18	London, ON; selected 26th overall in 1998

== Roster ==
No.	Nat.	Player	Class	Pos	Height	Weight	DoB	Hometown	Previous team	NHL rights
2		Kevin Magnuson	Sophomore	D	6' 1" (1.85 m)	194 lb (88 kg)	1976-11-25	Lake Forest, Illinois	Dubuque Fighting Saints (USHL)	—
3		Andrew Berenzweig	Junior	D	6' 2" (1.88 m)	215 lb (98 kg)	1977-08-08	Arlington Heights, Illinois	Loomis Chaffee School (USHS-Prep)	—
4		Mike Van Ryn	Freshman	D	6' 1" (1.85 m)	198 lb (90 kg)	1979-05-14	London, Ontario	London Nationals (WOHL)	NJD, 26th overall 1998
6		Scott Crawford	Junior	D	6' 0" (1.83 m)	190 lb (86 kg)	1979-04-21	Etobicoke, Ontario	Bramalea Blues (OPJHL)	—
7		Justin Clark	Junior	RW	6' 3" (1.91 m)	191 lb (87 kg)	1977-01-29	Grand Rapids, Michigan	Taft School (USHS-Prep)	COL, 240th overall 1996
8		Matt Herr (C)	Senior	C	6' 2" (1.88 m)	188 lb (85 kg)	1976-05-26	Hackensack, New Jersey	Hotchkiss School (USHS-Prep)	WSH, 93rd overall 1994
9		Mark Kosick	Freshman	C	6' 0" (1.83 m)	187 lb (85 kg)	1979-03-25	Victoria, British Columbia	Victoria Salsa (BCHL)	CAR, 211th overall 1998
10		Scott Matzka	Freshman	C	6' 0" (1.83 m)	194 lb (88 kg)	1978-05-11	Port Huron, Michigan	Omaha Lancers (USHL)	—
11		Andrew Merrick	Sophomore	LW	6' 0" (1.83 m)	196 lb (89 kg)	1978-03-23	Syosset, New York	Sarnia Steeplejacks (WOHL)	CAR, 169th overall 1997
16		Bill Muckalt (A)	Senior	RW	6' 1" (1.85 m)	185 lb (84 kg)	1974-07-15	Surrey, British Columbia	Kelowna Spartans (BCJHL)	VAN, 221st overall 1994
17		Sean Ritchlin	Junior	RW	6' 0" (1.83 m)	183 lb (83 kg)	1977-06-15	Rochester, New York	Hotchkiss School (USHS-Prep)	NJD, 145th overall 1996
18		Geoff Koch	Freshman	LW	6' 2" (1.88 m)	196 lb (89 kg)	1979-06-27	Exeter, New Hampshire	Phillips Exeter Academy (USHS-Prep)	NSH, 85th overall 1998
19		Troy Kahler	Freshman	C/LW	6' 1" (1.85 m)	218 lb (99 kg)	1979-06-05	Toronto, Ontario	Thornhill Islanders (MetJAHL)	—
20		Bob Gassoff	Freshman	D	5' 10" (1.78 m)	190 lb (86 kg)	1977-07-24	St. Louis, Missouri	Chilliwack Chiefs (BCHL)	—
21		Josh Langfeld	Freshman	RW	6' 3" (1.91 m)	216 lb (98 kg)	1977-07-17	Fridley, Minnesota	Lincoln Stars (USHL)	OTT, 66th overall 1997
22		Bill Trainor	Freshman	LW	6' 0" (1.83 m)	185 lb (84 kg)	1976-04-23	Canton, Michigan	Des Moines Buccaneers (USHL)	—
23		Dale Rominski	Junior	RW	6' 2" (1.88 m)	188 lb (85 kg)	1975-10-01	Farmington Hills, Michigan	Detroit Compuware Ambassadors (NAHL)	—
24		Sean Peach	Sophomore	D	5' 11" (1.8 m)	180 lb (82 kg)	1978-11-05	Langley, British Columbia	Powell River Paper Kings (BCHL)	—
25		Bobby Hayes	Junior	C	6' 0" (1.83 m)	183 lb (83 kg)	1975-01-06	Westland, Michigan	Detroit Compuware Ambassadors (NAHL)	—
26		Chris Fox	Senior	D	6' 1" (1.85 m)	185 lb (84 kg)	1976-08-29	Grosse Pointe Farms, Michigan	Detroit Compuware Ambassadors (NAHL)	—
27		David Huntzicker	Freshman	D	6' 3" (1.91 m)	201 lb (91 kg)	1976-09-15	Ann Arbor, Michigan	Detroit Compuware Ambassadors (NAHL)	—
28		Warren Luhning	Junior	RW	6' 2" (1.88 m)	188 lb (85 kg)	1975-07-03	Edmonton, Alberta	Calgary Royals (AJHL)	NYI, 92nd overall 1993
29		Gregg Malicke	Senior (RS)	G	6' 0" (1.83 m)	174 lb (79 kg)	1975-04-20	Rochester Hills, Michigan	Clarkson Golden Knights (ECAC)	—
30		Greg Daddario	Junior	G	5' 7" (1.7 m)	171 lb (78 kg)	1976-08-16	Wilton, Connecticut	Loomis Chaffee School (USHS-Prep)	—
32		Krikor Arman	Freshman	LW	6' 0" (1.83 m)	201 lb (91 kg)	1978-03-08	West Bloomfield, Michigan		—
33		Greg Crozier	Junior	LW	6' 3" (1.91 m)	191 lb (87 kg)	1976-07-06	Calgary, Alberta	Lawrence Academy (USHS-Prep)	PIT, 73rd overall 1994
35		Marty Turco (A)	Senior	G	5' 11" (1.8 m)	180 lb (82 kg)	1975-08-13	Sault Ste. Marie, Ontario	Cambridge Winter Hawks (MWJHL)	DAL, 124th overall 1994

== Standings ==
1997–98 Central Collegiate Hockey Association standings
	Conference							Overall					
	GP	W	L	T	PTS	GF	GA	GP	W	L	T	GF	GA
Michigan State†*	30	21	5	4	46	110	54	44	33	6	5	156	76
Michigan	30	22	7	1	45	109	69	46	34	11	1	163	108
Ohio State	30	19	10	1	39	106	76	42	27	13	2	161	110
Northern Michigan	30	15	12	3	33	96	90	38	19	15	4	130	117
Miami	30	14	12	4	32	100	87	37	19	14	4	134	114
Lake Superior State	30	12	14	4	28	82	100	37	15	18	4	104	121
Notre Dame	30	12	14	4	28	91	89	41	18	19	4	127	115
Ferris State	30	12	15	3	27	88	106	39	15	21	3	119	138
Western Michigan	30	9	19	2	20	80	91	38	10	25	3	94	125
Alaska-Fairbanks	30	7	20	3	17	87	138	35	10	21	4	110	154
Bowling Green	30	6	21	3	15	77	106	38	8	27	3	100	157
Championship: Michigan State † indicates conference regular season champion * indicates conference tournament champion Final rankings: USA Today/American Hockey Magazine Coaches Poll Top 10 Poll

== Schedule and results ==
Date	Opponent^{#}	Rank^{#}	Site	Decision	Result	Record
Regular season
October 10	vs. #4 Minnesota*	#9	Target Center • Minneapolis (US Hockey Hall of Fame game)	Turco	W 3–2	1–0–0
October 12	vs. Toronto*	#9	Yost Ice Arena • Ann Arbor, Michigan	Turco	W 9–2	2–0–0
October 17	vs. Colgate*	#5	Yost Ice Arena • Ann Arbor, Michigan	Turco	L 1–2	2–1–0
October 18	vs. Colgate*	#5	Yost Ice Arena • Ann Arbor, Michigan	Turco	W 6–4	2–1–0
October 25	vs. #2 Michigan State	#8	Yost Ice Arena • Ann Arbor, Michigan	Turco	L 2–4	3–2–0 (0–1–0)
October 31	at Alaska–Fairbanks	#8	Carlson Center • Fairbanks, Alaska	Turco	W 6–3	4–2–0 (1–1–0)
November 1	at Alaska–Fairbanks	#8	Carlson Center • Fairbanks, Alaska	Turco	W 4–3	5–2–0 (2–1–0)
November 7	at Northern Michigan	#8	Lakeview Arena • Marquette, Michigan	Turco	W 5–3	6–2–0 (3–1–0)
November 8	at Northern Michigan	#8	Lakeview Arena • Marquette, Michigan	Turco	L 0–1	6–3–0 (3–2–0)
November 14	at Ferris State	#10	Yost Ice Arena • Ann Arbor, Michigan	Turco	W 3–2 ^{OT}	7–3–0 (4–2–0)
November 16	vs. Ferris State	#10	Van Andel Arena • Grand Rapids, Michigan	Turco	T 3–3 ^{OT}	7–3–1 (4–2–1)
November 21	vs. Bowling Green		BGSU Ice Arena • Bowling Green, Ohio	Turco	W 4–2	8–3–1 (5–2–1)
November 23	vs. Ohio State		OSU Ice Rink • Columbus, Ohio	Turco	W 3–2 ^{OT}	9–3–1 (6–2–1)
College Hockey Showcase
November 28	at Minnesota*		Mariucci Arena • Minneapolis (College Hockey Showcase game 1)	Turco	W 4–3	10–3–1
November 30	at #6 Wisconsin*		Kohl Center • Madison, Wisconsin (College Hockey Showcase game 2)	Turco	W 2–1	11–3–1
December 5	at Lake Superior State		Taffy Abel Arena • Sault Ste. Marie, Michigan	Turco	W 7–0	12–3–1 (7–2–1)
December 12	vs. Western Michigan	#7	Van Andel Arena • Grand Rapids, Michigan	Turco	W 4–3	13–3–1 (8–2–1)
December 13	vs. Western Michigan	#7	Yost Ice Arena • Ann Arbor, Michigan	Turco	W 4–1	14–3–1 (9–2–1)
Great Lakes Invitational
December 27	vs. St. Lawrence*	#5	Joe Louis Arena • Detroit (Great Lakes semifinal)	Turco	W 3–2	15–3–1
December 28	vs. #2 Michigan State*	#5	Joe Louis Arena • Detroit (Great Lakes championship)	Turco	L 3–5	15–4–1
January 2	vs. Ohio State	#7	Yost Ice Arena • Ann Arbor, Michigan	Turco	W 4–2	16–4–1 (10–2–1)
January 3	vs. Ohio State	#7	Yost Ice Arena • Ann Arbor, Michigan	Turco	W 6–0	17–4–1 (11–2–1)
January 9	vs. Bowling Green	#6	Yost Ice Arena • Ann Arbor, Michigan	Turco	W 4–2	18–4–1 (12–2–1)
January 10	at Western Michigan	#6	Lawson Arena • Kalamazoo, Michigan	Turco	W 4–3 ^{OT}	19–4–1 (13–2–1)
January 17	vs. Alaska–Fairbanks	#5	Yost Ice Arena • Ann Arbor, Michigan	Turco	W 5–1	20–4–1 (14–2–1)
January 23	at #7 Miami	#4	Goggin Ice Arena • Oxford, Ohio	Turco	L 1–3	20–5–1 (14–3–1)
January 24	at #7 Miami	#4	Goggin Ice Arena • Oxford, Ohio	Turco	L 3–4	20–6–1 (14–4–1)
January 30	at Notre Dame	#7	Edmund P. Joyce Center • Notre Dame, Indiana	Turco	W 7–2	21–6–1 (15–4–1)
January 31	vs. Notre Dame	#7	Yost Ice Arena • Ann Arbor, Michigan	Malicke	W 5–4 ^{OT}	22–6–1 (16–4–1)
February 7	vs. Lake Superior State	#6	Joe Louis Arena • Detroit	Turco	W 4–1	23–6–1 (17–4–1)
February 13	vs. #7 Miami	#5	Yost Ice Arena • Ann Arbor, Michigan	Turco	W 3–1	24–6–1 (18–4–1)
February 14	vs. Northern Michigan	#5	Yost Ice Arena • Ann Arbor, Michigan	Turco	W 4–2	25–6–1 (19–4–1)
February 20	at #2 Michigan State	#5	Munn Ice Arena • East Lansing, Michigan	Malicke	L 1–5	25–7–1 (19–5–1)
February 21	vs. #2 Michigan State	#5	Joe Louis Arena • Detroit	Turco	L 1–4	25–8–1 (19–6–1)
February 27	vs. Ferris State	#5	Yost Ice Arena • Ann Arbor, Michigan	Turco	L 1–2	25–9–1 (19–7–1)
February 28	vs. Lake Superior State	#5	Yost Ice Arena • Ann Arbor, Michigan	Turco	W 5–2	26–9–1 (20–7–1)
March 6	vs. Bowling Green	#4	BGSU Ice Arena • Bowling Green, Ohio	Turco	W 5–4	27–9–1 (21–7–1)
March 7	vs. Notre Dame	#4	Edmund P. Joyce Center • Notre Dame, Indiana	Turco	W 1–0	28–9–1 (22–7–1)
CCHA Tournament
March 13	vs. Notre Dame*	#4	Yost Ice Arena • Ann Arbor, Michigan (CCHA first round game 1)	Turco	L 2–4	28–10–1
March 14	vs. Notre Dame*	#4	Yost Ice Arena • Ann Arbor, Michigan (CCHA first round game 2)	Turco	W 2–1 ^{OT}	29–10–1
March 15	vs. Notre Dame*	#4	Yost Ice Arena • Ann Arbor, Michigan (CCHA first round game 3)	Turco	W 4–3	30–10–1
Michigan Won Series 2-1
March 20	vs. #8 Ohio State*	#5	Joe Louis Arena • Detroit (CCHA semifinal)	Turco	L 2–4	30–11–1
NCAA Tournament
March 27	vs. Princeton*	#5	Yost Ice Arena • Ann Arbor, Michigan (NCAA west regional quarterfinal)	Turco	W 2–1	31–11–1
March 28	vs. #1 North Dakota*	#5	Yost Ice Arena • Ann Arbor, Michigan (NCAA west regional semifinal)	Turco	W 4–3	32–11–1
April 2	vs. New Hampshire*	#5	FleetCenter • Boston (NCAA national semifinal)	Turco	W 4–0	33–11–1
April 4	vs. #3 Boston College*	#5	FleetCenter • Boston (NCAA national championship)	Turco	W 3–2 ^{OT}	34–11–1
*Non-conference game. ^{#}Rankings from USCHO.com Poll. Source:

== 1998 National Championship ==
April 4	Michigan	3 – 2	OT	Boston College	Fleet Center

Scoring summary
Period	Team	Goal	Assist(s)	Time	Score
1st	BC	Kevin Caufield	Mottau	4:19	1–0 BC
2nd	UM	Mark Kosick	Berenzweig and Crozier	27:42	1–1
2nd	BC	Mike Lephart – PP	Farkas and Allen	38:38	2–1 BC
3rd	UM	Mark Kosick	Muckalt and Fox	53:48	2–2
1st Overtime	UM	Josh Langfeld – GW	Fox and Matzka	77:51	3–2 UM

Shots by period
Team	1	2	3	OT	T
Michigan	7	8	10	10	35
Boston College	11	7	9	3	30

Goaltenders
Team	Name	Saves	Goals against	Time on ice
UM	Marty Turco	28	2	
BC	Scott Clemmensen	32	3	

== Scoring statistics ==
Name	Position	Games	Goals	Assists	Points	PIM
Bill Muckalt	RW	46	32	35	67	94
Mark Kosick	C	45	14	32	46	18
Bobby Hayes	C	45	21	23	44	68
Josh Langfeld	RW	46	19	17	36	66
Matt Herr	C	31	14	17	31	62
Dale Rominski	RW	46	10	14	24	102
Greg Crozier	LW	45	12	10	22	26
Chris Fox	D	43	5	17	22	28
Andrew Berenzweig	D	45	8	11	19	32
Mike Van Ryn	D	38	4	14	18	44
Scott Matzka	C	41	4	11	15	36
Geoff Koch	LW	43	5	6	11	51
Sean Peach	D	36	1	7	8	69
David Huntzicker	D	46	0	8	8	24
Andrew Merrick	LW	33	4	3	7	74
Justin Clark	RW	41	3	4	7	27
Sean Ritchlin	RW	27	3	3	6	29
Bill Trainor	LW	34	0	6	6	6
Troy Kahler	C/LW	22	1	4	5	16
Scott Crawford	D	30	0	5	5	16
Marty Turco	G	45	0	4	4	20
Krikor Arman	LW	6	2	1	3	2
Bob Gassoff	D	24	1	2	3	24
Kevin Magnuson	D	15	0	1	1	14
Greg Daddario	G	1	0	0	0	0
Gregg Malicke	G	8	0	0	0	0
Bench	–	46	–	-	–	12
Total			163	255	418	960

== Goaltending statistics ==
Name	Games	Minutes	Wins	Losses	Ties	Goals against	Saves	Shut outs	SV %	GAA
Marty Turco	45	2640	33	10	1	95	927	4	.907	2.16
Gregg Malicke	8	151	1	1	0	10	56	0	.848	3.97
Greg Daddario	1	16	0	0	0	2	4	0	.667	7.73
Empty Net	–	–	–	–	–	1	–	–	–	-
Total	46		34	11	1	108	987	4	.901	

== Rankings ==
Poll	Week																								
Poll	Pre	1	2	3	4	5	6	7	8	9	10	11	12	13	14	15	16	17	18	19	20	21	22	23	24 (Final)
USCHO.com	9	5	8	8	8	10	NR	NR	7	7	5	7	6	5	4	7	6	5	5	5	4	4	5	5	N/A
USA Today	-	-	-	8	10	8	NR	NR	9	6	-	7	7	5	5	10	8	6	6	5	5	4	-	-	-

USCHO did not release a poll in week 24.

== Awards and honors ==
Player	Award	Ref
Marty Turco	NCAA Tournament Most Outstanding Player	
Bill Muckalt	AHCA West First Team All-American	
Marty Turco	NCAA All-Tournament Team	
Andrew Berenzweig	NCAA All-Tournament Team	
Mark Kosick	NCAA All-Tournament Team	
Josh Langfeld	NCAA All-Tournament Team	
Bill Muckalt	All-CCHA First Team	
Marty Turco	All-CCHA Second Team	
Andrew Berenzweig	All-CCHA Second Team	
Bobby Hayes	All-CCHA Second Team	
Mike Van Ryn	CCHA All-Rookie Team	
Mark Kosick	CCHA All-Rookie Team	

== Players drafted into the NHL ==
=== 1998 NHL entry draft ===
= NHL All-Star team	= NHL All-Star	= NHL All-Star and NHL All-Star team	= Did not play in the NHL

Round	Pick	Player	NHL team
1	26	Mike Van Ryn	New Jersey Devils
3	85	Geoff Koch	Nashville Predators
3	91	Mike Comrie^{†}	Edmonton Oilers
5	116	Josh Blackburn^{†}	Phoenix Coyotes
8	201	Craig Murray^{†}	Montreal Canadiens
8	211	Mark Kosick	Carolina Hurricanes

† incoming freshman

== See also ==
- 1998 NCAA Division I Men's Ice Hockey Tournament
- List of NCAA Division I Men's Ice Hockey Tournament champions
