= 1999 CCHA men's ice hockey tournament =

Hockey tournament in Detroit

1999 CCHA Men's ice hockey tournament
- Dates: March 12–20, 1999
- Teams: 8
- Finals site: Joe Louis Arena; Detroit, Michigan
- Champions: Michigan (4th title)
- Winning coach: Red Berenson (4th title)
- MVP: Mark Kosick (Michigan)
- CCHA Men's Ice Hockey Tournaments

The 1999 CCHA Men's Ice Hockey Tournament was the 28th CCHA Men's Ice Hockey Tournament. It was played between March 12 and March 20, 1999. Opening round games were played at campus sites, while all 'final four' games were played at Joe Louis Arena in Detroit, Michigan. By winning the tournament, Michigan received the Central Collegiate Hockey Association's automatic bid to the 1999 NCAA Division I Men's Ice Hockey Tournament.

== Format ==
The tournament featured three rounds of play. The three teams that finish below eighth place in the standings were not eligible for postseason play. In the quarterfinals, the first and eighth seeds, the second and seventh seeds, the third seed and sixth seeds and the fourth seed and fifth seeds played a best-of-three series, with the winners advancing to the semifinals. In the semifinals, the remaining highest and lowest seeds and second highest and second lowest seeds play a single-game, with the winners advancing to the finals. The tournament champion receives an automatic bid to the 1999 NCAA Men's Division I Ice Hockey Tournament.

== Conference standings ==
Note: GP = Games played; W = Wins; L = Losses; T = Ties; PTS = Points; GF = Goals For; GA = Goals Against

1998–99 Central Collegiate Hockey Association standings
	Conference							Overall					
	GP	W	L	T	PTS	GF	GA	GP	W	L	T	GF	GA
#3 Michigan State†	30	20	3	7	47	91	40	42	29	6	7	121	56
#7 Michigan*	30	17	8	5	39	98	72	42	25	11	6	134	94
Ohio State	30	17	10	3	37	87	66	41	21	16	4	119	98
Notre Dame	30	15	11	4	34	92	68	38	19	14	5	114	100
Northern Michigan	30	14	11	5	33	94	83	42	22	15	5	143	112
Ferris State	30	13	12	5	31	76	69	36	14	16	6	89	87
Bowling Green	30	13	14	3	29	102	105	38	17	18	3	126	135
Lake Superior State	30	10	17	3	23	79	93	38	11	23	4	93	130
Miami	30	9	17	4	22	78	104	36	11	20	5	98	130
Western Michigan	30	5	17	8	18	69	119	34	6	20	8	75	130
Alaska-Fairbanks	30	8	21	1	17	77	124	34	11	22	1	94	131
Championship: Michigan † indicates conference regular season champion * indicates conference tournament champion Final rankings: USA Today/American Hockey Magazine Coaches Poll Top 10 Poll

== Bracket ==
Quarterfinals; March 12–14
1	Michigan State	3	4	–
8	Lake Superior State	2	0	–
2	Michigan	3	9	–
7	Bowling Green	2	3	–
(Pairings are reseeded after the first round)
3	Ohio State	4	3	–
6	Ferris State	1	2	–
4	Notre Dame	3	1	2
5	Northern Michigan	2	7	3

Semifinals; March 19
1	Michigan State	3
5	Northern Michigan	5
2	Michigan	3
3	Ohio State	2

Championship; March 20
2	Michigan	5
5	Northern Michigan	1

Note: * denotes overtime period(s)

=== Quarterfinals ===
==== (1) Michigan State vs. (8) Lake Superior State ====
March 12	Michigan State	3 – 2	Lake Superior State	Munn Ice Arena
No Scoring		First period	12:10 - Ryan Vince
Adam Hall - 13:02; Andrew Hutchinson - PP - 16:20		Second period	No scoring
Rustyn Dolyny - GW - 18:33		Third period	13:45 - Trent Walford
Joe Blackburn ( 19 saves / 21 shots )		Goalie stats	Jayme Platt ( 35 saves / 38 shots )

March 13	Michigan State	4 – 0	Lake Superior State	Munn Ice Arena
No Scoring		First period	No scoring
Adam Hall - GW - 06:41; Adam Hall - 07:19		Second period	No scoring
Mike York - 06:41; Bryan Adams - EN - 17:34		Third period	No scoring
Joe Blackburn ( 20 saves / 20 shots )		Goalie stats	Jayme Platt ( 28 saves / 31 shots ) / Mike Brusseau ( 0 saves / 0 shots )

Michigan State won series 2–0

==== (2) Michigan vs. (7) Bowling Green ====
March 11	Michigan	3 – 2	Bowling Green	Yost Ice Arena
Dale Rominski - SH - 13:26		First period	02:32 - Craig Desjarlais
No scoring		Second period	18:12 - Ryan Murphy
Bobby Hayes - 11:00; Dave Huntzicker - GW SH - 14:31		Third period	No scoring
Josh Blackburn ( 19 saves / 21 shots )		Goalie stats	Mike Savard ( 18 saves / 21 shots )

March 13	Michigan	9 - 3	Bowling Green	Yost Ice Arena
Mike Comrie - 15:01; Josh Langfeld - PP - 17:04		First period	No scoring
Geoff Koch - 08:09; Sean Ritchlin - GW - 13:56; Bobby Hayes - 19:52		Second period	03:25 - PP - Greg Day; 16:18 - PP - Dan Price
Bobby Hayes - PP - 04:27; Mike Van Ryn - PP - 05:06; Greg Crozier - 07:27; Josh Langfeld - PP - 19:37		Third period	00:28 - PP - Dan Price
Josh Blackburn ( 21 saves / 24 shots ) / Kevin O'Malley ( 2 saves / 2 shots )		Goalie stats	Mike Savard ( 30 saves / 39 shots )

Michigan won series 2–0

==== (3) Ohio State vs. (6) Ferris State ====
March 12	Ohio State	4 – 2	Ferris State	Value City Arena
No Scoring		First period	No scoring
Dan Cousineau - 15:02; Yan Des Gagne - 17:56		Second period	17:19 - Scott Lewis
Éric Meloche - GW PP - 04:15; Ryan Jestadt - EN SH - 19:53		Third period	17:19 - Rob Collins
Jeff Maund ( 23 saves / 25 shots )		Goalie stats	Vince Owen ( 16 saves / 19 shots ) / Phil Osaer ( 4 saves / 4 shots )

March 13	Ohio State	3 – 1	Ferris State	Value City Arena
No Scoring		First period	No scoring
No Scoring		Second period	01:30 - PP - Brian McCollough
Hugo Boisvert - PP - 07:31; Ryan Skaleski - GW - 12:02; Hugo Boisvert - EN SH - 19:58		Third period	No scoring
Jeff Maund ( 36 saves / 37 shots )		Goalie stats	Phil Osaer ( 25 saves / 27 shots )

Ohio State won series 2–0

==== (4) Notre Dame vs. (5) Northern Michigan ====
March 12	Notre Dame	3 – 2	Northern Michigan	Joyce Center
Dan Carlson - 01:19; Brian Urick - 11:25		First period	16:57 - Brad Frattaroli
No scoring		Second period	19:38 - SH - Tyson Holly
Ben Simon - GW - 17:27		Third period	No scoring
Forrest Karr ( 18 saves / 20 shots )		Goalie stats	Dan Ragusett ( 31 saves / 34 shots )

March 13	Notre Dame	1 – 7	Northern Michigan	Joyce Center
No Scoring		First period	00:13 - J.P. Vigier; 12:14 - GW - Sean Connolly
Ben Simon - 02:13		Second period	13:39 - PP - Buddy Smith; 15:55 - Bryan Phillips
No scoring		Third period	02:27 - Fred Mattersdorfer; 07:34 - J.P. Vigier; 12:45 - Bryan Phillips
Forrest Karr ( 23 saves / 29 shots ) / Jeremiah Kimento ( 5 saves / 69 shots )		Goalie stats	Dan Ragusett ( 26 saves / 27 shots )

March 14	Notre Dame	2 – 3	Northern Michigan	Joyce Center
No Scoring		First period	No scoring
Tyson Holly - 01:33		Second period	09:36 - PP - Benoit Cotnoir
Brian Urick - 05:37		Third period	03:07 - Sean Connolly; 08:46 - GW - Tyler Barabonoff
Forrest Karr ( 18 saves / 21 shots )		Goalie stats	Dan Ragusett ( 30 saves / 32 shots )

Northern Michigan won series 2–1

=== Semifinals ===
==== (1) Michigan State vs. (5) Northern Michigan ====
March 19	Michigan State	3 – 5	Northern Michigan	Joe Louis Arena
Brad Hodgins - PP - 06:06; Brad Hodgins - PP - 13:12; Mike York - 13:30		First period	12:18 - Tyson Holly; 17:42 - Roger Trudeau
No scoring		Second period	No scoring
No scoring		Third period	08:38 - Sean Connolly; 16:06 - GW - Brad Frattaroli; 19:25 - EN - J.P. Vigier
Joe Blackburn ( 15 saves / 19 shots )		Goalie stats	Dan Ragusett ( 31 saves / 44 shots )

==== (2) Michigan vs. (3) Ohio State ====
March 19	Michigan	3 – 2	Ohio State	Joe Louis Arena
Mark Kosick - PP - 14:07		First period	07:45 - Éric Meloche
Mark Kosick - PP - 03:30; Sean Ritchlin - GW - 14:38		Second period	12:01 - Dan Cousineau
No scoring		Third period	No scoring
Josh Blackburn ( 32 saves / 34 shots )		Goalie stats	Jeff Maund ( 21 saves / 24 shots )

=== Championship ===
==== (2) Michigan vs. (5) Northern Michigan ====
March 20	Michigan	5 – 1	Northern Michigan	Joe Louis Arena
Scott Matzka - 11:59; Dale Rominski - GW - 14:11		First period	No scoring
Dave Huntzicker - 04:52; Greg Crozier - 08:16; Mark Kosick - 11:43		Second period	03:16 - J.P. Vigier
No scoring		Third period	No scoring
Josh Blackburn ( 29 saves / 30 shots )		Goalie stats	Dan Ragusett ( 21 saves / 26 shots )

== Tournament awards ==
=== All-Tournament Team ===
- F Mark Kosick* (Michigan)
- F Sean Ritchlin (Michigan)
- F J.P. Vigier (Northern Michigan)
- D Sean Connolly (Northern Michigan)
- D Mike Van Ryn (Michigan)
- G Josh Blackburn (Michigan)

* Most Valuable Player(s)
