= 1998 NCAA Division I men's ice hockey tournament =

- Teams: 12
- Finals site: FleetCenter, Boston
- Champions: Michigan Wolverines (9th title)
- Runner-up: Boston College Eagles (4th title game)
- Semifinalists: New Hampshire Wildcats (4th Frozen Four); Ohio State Buckeyes (1st Frozen Four)
- Winning coach: Red Berenson (2nd title)
- MOP: Marty Turco (Michigan)
- Attendance: 79,362

The 1998 NCAA Division I men's ice hockey tournament involved 12 schools playing in single-elimination play to determine the national champion of men's NCAA Division I college ice hockey. It began on March 27, 1998, and ended with the championship game on April 4. A total of 11 games were played.

This year's tournament was the first since 1988 to feature multiple programs, Ohio State and Princeton, making their first appearance in the NCAA playoffs.

== Qualifying teams ==
The at-large bids and seeding for each team in the tournament were announced after the conference tournaments concluded. The Central Collegiate Hockey Association (CCHA), the ECAC, Hockey East and Western Collegiate Hockey Association (WCHA) all received 3 berths in the tournament.

East Regional – Albany							West Regional – Ann Arbor						
Seed	School	Conference	Record	Berth type	Appearance	Last bid	Seed	School	Conference	Record	Berth type	Appearance	Last bid
1	Boston University	Hockey East	28–7–2	At-large bid	24th	1997	1	Michigan State	CCHA	33–5–5	Tournament champion	18th	1997
2	Boston College	Hockey East	26–8–5	Tournament champion	19th	1991	2	North Dakota	WCHA	30–7–1	At-large bid	14th	1997
3	Clarkson	ECAC	23–8–3	At-large bid	17th	1997	3	Michigan	CCHA	30–11–1	At-large bid	21st	1997
4	Wisconsin	WCHA	26–13–1	Tournament champion	17th	1995	4	Ohio State	CCHA	25–12–2	At-large bid	1st	Never
5	New Hampshire	Hockey East	23–11–1	At-large bid	9th	1997	5	Yale	ECAC	23–8–3	At-large bid	2nd	1952
6	Colorado College	WCHA	25–12–3	At-large bid	12th	1997	6	Princeton	ECAC	18–10–7	Tournament champion	1st	Never

== Game locations ==
- East Regional – Pepsi Arena, Albany, New York
- West Regional – Yost Ice Arena, Ann Arbor, Michigan
- Frozen Four – Fleet Center, Boston

== Bracket ==
First Round; March 27–28
E4	Wisconsin	4
E5	New Hampshire	7
W3	Michigan	2
W6	Princeton	1
E3	Clarkson	1
E6	Colorado College	3
W4	Ohio State	4
W5	Yale	0

Quarterfinals; March 28–29
E1	Boston University	3
E5	New Hampshire	4*
W2	North Dakota	3
W3	Michigan	4
E2	Boston College	6
E6	Colorado College	1
W1	Michigan State	3
W4	Ohio State	4*

National Semifinals; April 2
E5	New Hampshire	0
W3	Michigan	4
E2	Boston College	5
W4	Ohio State	2

National Championship; April 4
W3	Michigan	3*
E2	Boston College	2

Note: * denotes overtime period(s)

== Results ==
=== East Regional – Albany, New York ===
==== First Round ====
March 28, 1998; 12:00 pm	(3) Clarkson	1–3 (0–1, 0–2, 1–0)	(6) Colorado College	Pepsi Arena; Attendance: 6,623

Game reference

Dan Murphy
Goalies
Jason Cugnet
Referee:
Matt Shegos
Linesmen:
John Dobrzelewski
John Nowosatka

	0 – 1	11:07 – T.J. Tanberg (Elfring, Gudmundson)
	0 – 2	24:11 – GW – Brian Swanson (S. Swanson)
	0 – 3	29:17 – Calvin Elfring (Morrison)
(Cole, Clark) Buddy Wallace – 57:43	1 – 3

18 min
Penalties
20 min
31
Shots
35

March 28, 1998; 3:00 pm	(4) Wisconsin	4–7 (1–1, 2–1, 1–5)	(5) New Hampshire	Pepsi Arena; Attendance: 6,727

Game reference

Graham Melanson
Goalies
Sean Matile
Referee:
Mike Noeth
Linesmen:
Joel Dupree
Mike Campatelli

	0 – 1	06:56 – PP – Jayme Filipowicz (Krog, Nolan)
(Englehart) Rick Enrico – 10:13	1 – 1
(Gruden, Englehart) Rick Enrico – 24:28	2 – 1
(Bradley) Mark Smith – 25:53	3 – 1
	3 – 2	34:55 – Dylan Dellezay (Bekar)
	3 – 3	41:25 – Jason Krog (Onufrechuk, Nolan)
	3 – 4	43:21 – Jason Shipulski (Sadowski, Souza)
	3 – 5	45:43 – GW PP – Jason Krog (Mowers, Filipowicz)
	3 – 6	47:07 – Steve O'Brien (Krog, Onufrechuk)
(Bianchi) Craig Anderson – PP – 49:27	4 – 6
	4 – 7	59:31 – EN – Mark Mowers (Bekar, Filipowicz)

18 min
Penalties
12 min
25
Shots
37

==== Quarterfinals ====
March 29, 1998; 5:30 pm	(1) Boston University	3–4 (OT) (1–1, 2–2, 0–0, 0–1)	(5) New Hampshire	Pepsi Arena; Attendance: 7,096

Game reference

Michel Larocque
Goalies
Sean Matile
Referee:
Matt Shegos
Linesmen:
John Dobrzelewski
John Nowosalka

	0 – 1	11:33 – PP – Tom Nolan (Bekar, Filipowicz)
(Sylvia) Nick Gillis – PP – 16:15	1 – 1
	1 – 2	26:29 – SH – Mark Mowers (Bekar)
(Drury) Tommi Degerman – 35:55	2 – 2
(Drury, Kealty) Tommi Degerman – SH – 37:34	3 – 2
	3 – 3	38:54 – PP – Derek Bekar (Mowers, Filipowicz)
	3 – 4	70:49 – GW SH – Mark Mowers (Souza)

31
Shots
37

March 29, 1998; 2:00 pm	(2) Boston College	6–1 (3–0, 2–1, 1–0)	(6) Colorado College	Pepsi Arena

Game reference

Scott Clemmensen
Goalies
Jason Cugnet (out 40:00)
Colin Zulianello (in 40:00)
Referee:
Mike Noeth
Linesmen:
Joel Dupree
Fred Campatelli

(Powers, Scuderi) Mike Mottau – 06:15	1 – 0
(Bellefeuille) Marty Reasoner – GW PP – 07:19	2 – 0
(unassisted) Jeff Farkas – SH – 18:51	3 – 0
	3 – 1	20:37 – PP – T.J. Tanberg (Petersen, Elfring)
(Lephart, Scuderi) Blake Bellefeuille – PP – 24:12	4 – 1
(Hutchins) Kevin Caulfield - 39:20	5 – 1
(Reasoner, Powers) Brian Gionta – 49:54	6 – 1

34
Shots
18

=== West Regional – Ann Arbor, Michigan ===
==== First Round ====
March 27, 1998; 8:30 pm	(3) Michigan	2–1 (0–0, 1–1, 1–0)	(6) Princeton	Yost Ice Arena; Attendance: 6,437

Game reference

Marty Turco
Goalies
Erasmo Saltarelli
Referee:
Don Adam
Linesmen:
Derek Sheppard
John Campion

(Kosick, Herr) Chris Fox – PP – 30:45	1 – 0
	1 – 1	38:38 – Jeff Halpern (Masters)
(unassisted) Mark Kosick – GW – 40:41	2 – 1

8 min
Penalties
12 min
31
Shots
21

March 27, 1998; 5:00 pm	(4) Ohio State	4–0 (0–0, 2–0, 2–0)	(5) Yale	Yost Ice Arena

Game reference

Jeff Maund
Goalies
Alex Westlund
Referee:
Tim Benedetto
Linesmen:
Bill Jones
John Jones

(Root) Todd Compeau – GW – 26:38	1 – 0
(Jestadt, Richards) Todd Compeau – PP – 35:43	2 – 0
(Boisvert, Meloche) Jean-Francois Dufour – 44:50	3 – 0
(Meloche) Jason Selleke – EN – 58:35	4 – 0

10 min
Penalties
12 min
30
Shots
22

==== Quarterfinals ====
March 28, 1998; 6:00 pm	(1) Michigan State	3–4 (OT) (1–0, 2–2, 0–1, 0–1)	(4) Ohio State	Yost Ice Arena; Attendance: 6,544

Game reference

Chad Alban
Goalies
Jeff Maund
Referee:
Don Adam
Linesmen:
John Campion
Derek Sheppard

(York, Kozakowski) Brad Hodgins – PP – 18:34	1 – 0
(Weaver, York) Shawn Horcoff – PP – 26:10	2 – 0
	2 – 1	26:53 – Andrè Signoretti (Richards)
	2 – 2	31:25 – PP – Éric Meloche (Boisvert, Maund)
(Berens, York) Rustyn Dolyny – PP – 37:23	3 – 2
	3 – 3	45:43 – Neil Rech (McMillan)
	3 – 4	68:47 – GW – Andrè Signoretti (Meloche, Boisvert)

14 min
Penalties
14 min
36
Shots
30

March 28, 1998; 9:00 pm	(2) North Dakota	3–4 (2–0, 1–2, 0–2)	(3) Michigan	Yost Ice Arena; Attendance: 6,554

Game reference

Aaron Schweitzer
Goalies
Marty Turco
Referee:
Tim Benedetto
Linesmen:
Bill Jones
John Jones

(Vig) Matt Henderson – 08:25	1 – 0
(Ja. Panzer) David Hoogsteen – 18:53	2 – 0
	2 – 1	23:28 – SH – Matt Herr (Clark, Turco)
(Hammer, Vig) Adam Calder – 25:06	3 – 1
	3 – 2	28:38 – Bill Muckalt (Kosick, Herr)
	3 – 3	40:56 – PP – Greg Crozier (Kosick, Herr)
	3 – 4	57:06 – GW – Bobby Hayes (Herr, Clark)

18 min
Penalties
51 min
32
Shots
29

=== Frozen Four – Boston, Massachusetts ===
==== National Semifinals ====
April 2, 1998; 2:00 pm	(W3) Michigan	4–0 (1–0, 2–0, 1–0)	(E5) New Hampshire	Fleet Center; Attendance: 17,989

Game reference

Marty Turco
Goalies
Sean Matile
Referee:
Mike Noeth
Linesmen:
Fred Campatelli
Joel Dupree

(Rominski) Bubba Berenzweig – GW SH – 13:34	1 – 0
(Hayes, Merrick) Bubba Berenzweig – PP – 27:43	2 – 0
(Clark, Huntzicker) Geoff Koch – 28:26	3 – 0
(Muckalt, Langfeld) Matt Herr – PP – 57:12	4 – 0

8 min
Penalties
22 min
30
Shots
19

April 2, 1998; 8:00 pm	(E2) Boston College	5–2 (1–0, 1–2, 3–0)	(W4) Ohio State	Fleet Center; Attendance: 18,089

Game reference

Scott Clemmensen
Goalies
Jeff Maund
Referee:
Mike Schmitt
Linesmen:
Randy Schmidt
John Elvy

(unassisted) Brian Gionta – SH – 08:40	1 – 0
(Mottau, Bellefeuille) Jeff Farkas – 30:24	2 – 0
	2 – 1	35:02 – Dan Cousineau (McMillan, Root)
	2 – 2	38:21 – Dan Cousineau (Compeau, Root)
(Gionta, Powers) Marty Reasoner – GW – 46:12	3 – 2
(Gionta, Scuderi) Andy Powers – 57:25	4 – 2
(unassisted) Marty Reasoner – 59:17	5 – 2

8 min
Penalties
25 min
42
Shots
20

==== National Championship ====
April 4, 1998; 7:30 pm	(E2) Boston College	2–3 (OT) (1–0, 1–1, 0–1, 0–1)	(W3) Michigan	Fleet Center; Attendance: 18,276

Game reference
Referee: Mike Schmitt; Linesmen: Randy Schmidt; John Elvy

Scoring summary
Period	Team	Goal	Assist(s)	Time	Score
1st	BC	Kevin Caufield	Mottau	4:19	1–0 BC
2nd	UM	Mark Kosick	Berenzweig and Crozier	27:42	1–1
2nd	BC	Mike Lephart – PP	Farkas and Allen	38:38	2–1 BC
3rd	UM	Mark Kosick	Muckalt and Fox	53:48	2–2
1st Overtime	UM	Josh Langfeld – GW	Fox and Matzka	77:51	3–2 UM
Penalty summary
Period	Team	Player	Penalty	Time	PIM
1st	UM	Bubba Berenzweig	Tripping	0:28	2:00
1st	UM	Scott Matzka	High-sticking	16:31	2:00
1st	BC	Kevin Caulfield	Cross-checking	18:36	2:00
2nd	BC	Jamie O'Leary	Slashing	20:51	2:00
2nd	BC	Ken Hemenway	Cross-checking	31:29	2:00
2nd	UM	Bobby Hayes	Holding	31:29	2:00
2nd	UM	Matt Herr	Checking from behind	37:26	2:00
3rd	BC	Ken Hemenway	Holding the stick	41:58	2:00
3rd	UM	Josh Langfeld	Hooking	42:44	2:00
3rd	BC	Blake Bellefeuille	Hooking	44:15	2:00
3rd	BC	Jamie O'Leary	Interference	49:55	2:00
1st Overtime	No penalties				

Shots by period
Team	1	2	3	OT	T
Michigan	7	8	10	10	35
Boston College	11	7	9	3	30

Goaltenders
Team	Name	Saves	Goals against	Time on ice
UM	Marty Turco	28	2	
BC	Scott Clemmensen	32	3	

== All-Tournament team ==
- G: Marty Turco* (Michigan)
- D: Bubba Berenzweig (Michigan)
- D: Mike Mottau (Boston College)
- F: Mark Kosick (Michigan)
- F: Josh Langfeld (Michigan)
- F: Marty Reasoner (Boston College)

* Most Outstanding Player(s)

== Record by conference ==
Conference	# of Bids	Record	Win %	Regional semifinals	Frozen Four	Championship Game	Champions
CCHA	3	6–2	.750	3	2	1	1
Hockey East	3	4–3	.571	3	2	1	–
WCHA	3	1–3	.250	2	-	-	-
ECAC	3	0–3	.000	-	-	-	-
