= St. Basil Secondary =

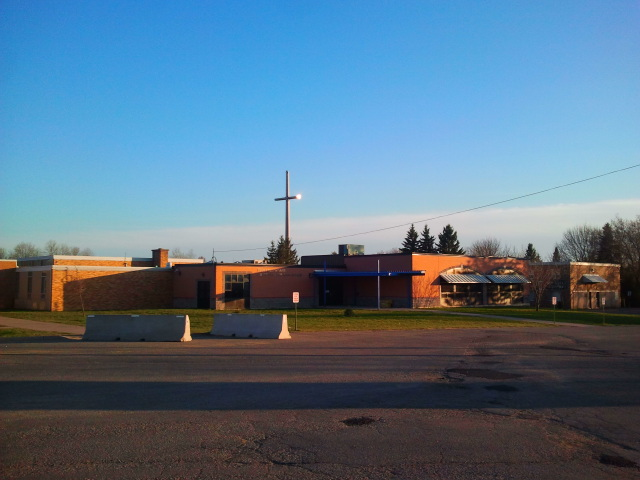

Location
- 250 St. George's Avenue East; Sault Ste. Marie, Ontario; Canada

Information
- Type: Secondary school
- Motto: To Teach, To Build, To Serve
- Established: 1991
- Closed: 2015
- Grades: 9–12
- Colours: Silver, black and grey
- Athletics: Basketball, hockey, volleyball, football
- Mascot: Basil the Bull-Dog
- Nickname: Basil's, SBSS, Saints
- Rival: St. Mary's College
- Emblem: Catholic Cross
- Website: netbasil.hscdsb.on.ca

St. Basil Secondary was a Canadian high school in Sault Ste. Marie, Ontario. It was established in September 1991 by the Huron-Superior Catholic District School Board on St. Georges Avenue. The school was renovated and was expanded soon after St. Mary's College moved locations. The large facility was also used, in the easterly expanded section, by Notre-Dame de Grand Lacs in 1987, the only French-as-first-language high school in Sault Ste. Marie before its movement in 2012. The mascot of St. Basil Secondary was a bulldog, and all sports teams were referred to as the St. Basil Saints. In September 2015, St. Basil Secondary closed and was amalgamated with its rival school, St. Mary's College.

== Notable alumni ==
- Tyler Kennedy – 2009 NHL Stanley Cup Champion

== See also ==
- List of high schools in Ontario
