= Roger Crozier Saving Grace Award =

Defunct National Hockey League award

- Sport: Ice hockey
- Awarded for: goaltender who has played a minimum of 25 games and finished the season with the best save percentage in the National Hockey League.

History
- First award: 1999–2000 NHL season
- Final award: 2006–07 NHL season

The Roger Crozier Saving Grace Award, officially billed as the MBNA/MasterCard Roger Crozier Saving Grace Award, was an award in ice hockey given annually to the goaltender who finished the regular season with the best save percentage in the National Hockey League (NHL). Only goaltenders who played 25 games or more in the season were eligible for the award. A goaltender's save percentage represents the percentage of shots on goal that he stops, and is calculated by dividing the number of saves by the total number of shots on goal.

The award was first presented at the conclusion of the 1999–2000 season, and was named in honor of former Detroit Red Wings, Buffalo Sabres and Washington Capitals goaltender Roger Crozier, a Calder and Conn Smythe Trophy winner who played in the NHL from 1964 to 1977. It was presented by the MBNA corporation in memory of Crozier, who worked for the MBNA America Bank after retiring as a player, and died on January 11, 1996. The winner of the trophy received a commemorative crystal trophy and was given US$25,000 to donate to a youth hockey or other educational program of their choice.

By 2007, when it ceased being presented, the award had been handed to six different players on seven occasions. Marty Turco is the only goaltender to have won the award twice. Three Dallas Stars goalies have won the award, while two each have represented the Montreal Canadiens and the Minnesota Wild. Only seven awards were ever made. The award was not presented in 2005, as the entire 2004–05 season was canceled due to the lockout.

== Winners ==
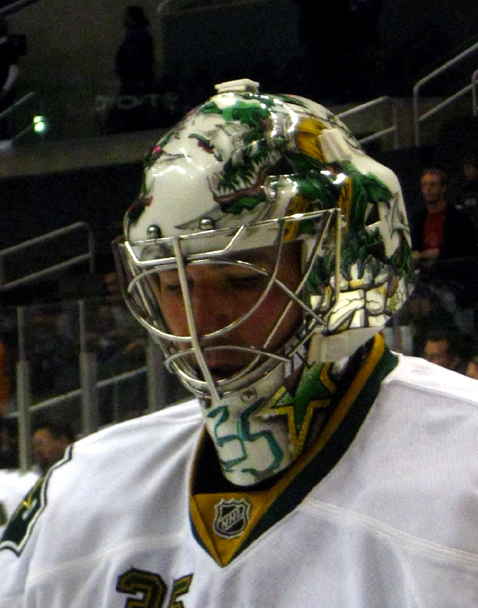
Marty Turco is the only player to have won the award twice.

Denotes players who are still active in the NHL
Denotes player who was elected to the Hockey Hall of Fame

Season	Player	Team	Save %	Win #	Ref.
1999–2000	Ed Belfour	Dallas Stars	.919	1^{†}	
2000–01	Marty Turco	Dallas Stars	.925	1	
2001–02	Jose Theodore	Montreal Canadiens	.931	1	
2002–03	Marty Turco	Dallas Stars	.932	2	
2003–04	Dwayne Roloson	Minnesota Wild	.933	1	
2004–05	Season cancelled due to the 2004–05 NHL lockout				
2005–06	Cristobal Huet	Montreal Canadiens	.929	1	
2006–07	Niklas Backstrom	Minnesota Wild	.929	1	

^{†} - Belfour was a prior save percentage leader in the 1990–91 season, before the Crozier Award was first presented.

=== Save-percentage leaders (1956–1999) ===
Before 2000, there was no award for leading the league in save percentage. The NHL started counting the statistic in 1982, while records have been compiled for save percentage back into the mid-1950s.

Bold denotes highest season save percentage on record

* Season shortened by the 1994–95 NHL lockout

Season	Player	Team	Save %	Win #
1955–56	Jacques Plante	Montreal Canadiens	.930	1
1956–57	Glenn Hall	Detroit Red Wings	.928	1
1957–58	Gump Worsley	New York Rangers	.927	1
1958–59	Jacques Plante	Montreal Canadiens	.925	2
1959–60	Johnny Bower	Toronto Maple Leafs	.919	1
1960–61	Johnny Bower	Toronto Maple Leafs	.923	2
1961–62	Jacques Plante	Montreal Canadiens	.923	3
1962–63	Glenn Hall	Chicago Black Hawks	.918	2
1963–64	Johnny Bower	Toronto Maple Leafs	.932	3
1964–65	Johnny Bower	Toronto Maple Leafs	.924	4
1965–66	Johnny Bower	Toronto Maple Leafs	.930	5
1966–67	Johnny Bower	Toronto Maple Leafs	.925	6
1967–68	Bruce Gamble	Toronto Maple Leafs	.934	1
1968–69	Jacques Plante	St. Louis Blues	.940	4
1969–70	Tony Esposito	Chicago Black Hawks	.932	1
1970–71	**Jacques Plante**	Toronto Maple Leafs	**.944**	5
1971–72	Tony Esposito	Chicago Black Hawks	.934	2
1972–73	Ken Dryden	Montreal Canadiens	.926	1
1973–74	Bernie Parent	Philadelphia Flyers	.932	1
1974–75	Rogie Vachon	Los Angeles Kings	.927	1
1975–76	Glenn Resch	New York Islanders	.914	1
1976–77	Ken Dryden	Montreal Canadiens	.920	2
1977–78	Ken Dryden	Montreal Canadiens	.922	3
1978–79	Glenn Resch	New York Islanders	.914	2
1979–80	Denis Herron	Montreal Canadiens	.907	1
1980–81	Rick St. Croix	Philadelphia Flyers	.913	1
1981–82	Denis Herron	Montreal Canadiens	.910	2
1982–83	Roland Melanson	New York Islanders	.909	1
1983–84	Roland Melanson	New York Islanders	.903	2
1984–85	Warren Skorodenski	Chicago Black Hawks	.903	1
1985–86	Bob Froese	Philadelphia Flyers	.909	1
1986–87	Ron Hextall	Philadelphia Flyers	.902	1
1987–88	Patrick Roy	Montreal Canadiens	.900	1
1988–89	Patrick Roy	Montreal Canadiens	.908	2
1989–90	Patrick Roy	Montreal Canadiens	.912	3
1990–91	Ed Belfour	Chicago Blackhawks	.910	1
1991–92	Patrick Roy	Montreal Canadiens	.914	4
1992–93	Curtis Joseph	St. Louis Blues	.911	1
1993–94	Dominik Hasek	Buffalo Sabres	.930	1
1994–95*	Dominik Hasek	Buffalo Sabres	.930	2
1995–96	Dominik Hasek	Buffalo Sabres	.920	3
1996–97	Dominik Hasek	Buffalo Sabres	.930	4
1997–98	Dominik Hasek	Buffalo Sabres	.932	5
1998–99	Dominik Hasek	Buffalo Sabres	.937	6

=== Save-percentage leaders (2007–present) ===
* Season shortened by the 2012–13 NHL lockout
^{†} Season shortened by the COVID-19 pandemic

Season	Player	Team	Save %	Win #
2007–08	Dan Ellis	Nashville Predators	.924	1
2008–09	Tim Thomas	Boston Bruins	.933	1
2009–10	Tuukka Rask	Boston Bruins	.931	1
2010–11	Tim Thomas	Boston Bruins	.938	2
2011–12	Brian Elliott	St. Louis Blues	.940	1
2012–13	Craig Anderson^{1}	Ottawa Senators	.941	1
2013–14	Josh Harding	Minnesota Wild	.933	1
2014–15	Carey Price	Montreal Canadiens	.933	1
2015–16	Brian Elliott	St. Louis Blues	.930	2
2016–17	Sergei Bobrovsky	Columbus Blue Jackets	.932	1
2017–18	Carter Hutton	St. Louis Blues	.931	1
2018–19	Ben Bishop	Dallas Stars	.934	1
2019–20^{†}	Anton Khudobin	Dallas Stars	.930	1
2020–21^{†}	Alex Nedeljkovic^{2}	Carolina Hurricanes	.932	1
2021–22	Igor Shesterkin	New York Rangers	.935	1
2022–23	Linus Ullmark	Boston Bruins	.938	1
2023–24	Anthony Stolarz	Florida Panthers	.925	1
2024–25	Anthony Stolarz	Toronto Maple Leafs	.926	2
2025–26	Scott Wedgewood	Colorado Avalanche	.921	1

== See also ==
- List of National Hockey League awards
- List of NHL statistical leaders
- William M. Jennings Trophy
- Vezina Trophy

== Notes ==
Craig Anderson only played in 24 games in the 2012–13 season, however due to the 2012–13 NHL lockout the minimum game restriction was reduced from 25 games to 14.
Alex Nedeljkovic only played in 23 games in the 2020–21 season, however due to the COVID-19 pandemic the minimum game restriction was reduced from 25 games to 17.
