= Mike Van Ryn =

Canadian former ice hockey defenceman

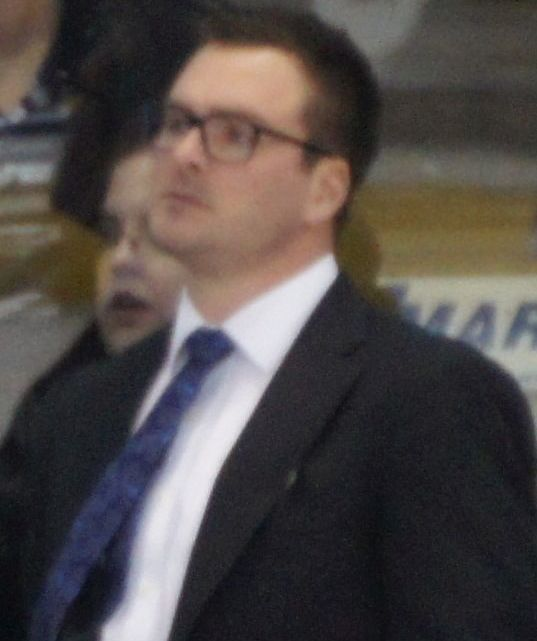
- Van Ryn coaching the Kitchener Rangers in 2015
- Born: May 14, 1979 (age 47) London, Ontario, Canada
- Height: 6 ft 1 in (185 cm)
- Weight: 202 lb (92 kg; 14 st 6 lb)
- Position: Defence
- Shot: Right
- Played for: St. Louis Blues; Florida Panthers; Toronto Maple Leafs
- National team: Canada
- NHL draft: 26th overall, 1998; New Jersey Devils
- Playing career: 1999–2011

Michael Theodore Van Ryn (born May 14, 1979) is a Canadian former professional ice hockey defenceman and current assistant coach for the Toronto Maple Leafs. He played for the St. Louis Blues, Florida Panthers, and Maple Leafs during his National Hockey League career.

== Playing career ==
=== College and junior career ===
==== University of Michigan Wolverines (1997–1999) ====
Van Ryn played with the University of Michigan Wolverines in 1997-98, where in 38 games, he scored four goals and 18 points. He helped the team win the National Championship, as Michigan defeated Boston College 3–2 in overtime in the final game.

Van Ryn returned to Michigan for the 1998–99 season, as he scored 10 goals and 23 points in 37 games. His 10 goals led all defensemen on the team.

==== Sarnia Sting (1999–2000) ====
Van Ryn joined the Sarnia Sting of the Ontario Hockey League for the 1999–2000 season. He was drafted by the Sting in the eighth round, 133rd overall, in the 1996 OHL Priority Selection.

He made his OHL debut on September 24, 1999, as he was held off the score sheet in 2–2 tie against the Plymouth Whalers. On September 26, Van Ryn earned his first point, an assist, in a 6–1 win over the Oshawa Generals. On October 15, Van Ryn scored his first OHL goal against Brian Finley of the Barrie Colts. He added two assists in the game, for an OHL career high three points in the game.

He finished the year playing in 61 games, scoring six goals and 41 points, finishing fifth in overall team scoring. In seven playoff games, Van Ryn earned five assists.

=== Professional career ===
==== New Jersey Devils (1998–2000) ====
Van Ryn was drafted by the New Jersey Devils in the first round, 26th overall, in the 1998 NHL entry draft. In June 2000, through a loophole, Van Ryn signed as a free agent with the St. Louis Blues. NHL teams retain the rights of drafted college players until they leave the school. Van Ryn challenged this practice in court and an arbitrator ruled that a player drafted off a college team could play one season of major junior hockey and then become a free agent. Thus after two years at the University of Michigan, Van Ryn went on to play one year for Sarnia Sting, and then became a free agent, which allowed him to sign a three-year deal with St. Louis.

==== St. Louis Blues (2000–2003) ====
Van Ryn appeared in his first NHL game on October 5, 2000 with the St. Louis Blues, getting 13:43 of ice time, however, he finished with no points and a -2 rating, as the Blues lost to the Phoenix Coyotes 4-1. It would be the only NHL game that Van Ryn would appear in during the 2000–01 season.

Van Ryn played in 37 games with the Worcester IceCats of the American Hockey League, scoring three goals and 13 points during the 2000–01. In seven playoff games, Van Ryn scored a goal and an assist.

He began the 2001–02 season with the IceCats, appearing in 24 games, scoring two goals and nine points. Van Ryn was called up to the Blues in December, and spent the remainder of the 2001–02 season in the NHL.

On January 1, Van Ryn earned his first career NHL point, an assist on a goal by Doug Weight, as the Blues lost to the New Jersey Devils 2–1. Van Ryn scored his first career NHL goal on January 23 against Martin Biron of the Buffalo Sabres in a 5–2 Blues victory. On March 17, he recorded his first multi-point game, scoring a goal and an assist in a 3-2 victory over the Mighty Ducks of Anaheim. In 48 games with St. Louis, Van Ryn had two goals and 10 points. Van Ryn played in his first career playoff game on April 20, as he did not record a point in a 2-0 win over the Chicago Blackhawks. In nine playoff games, Van Ryn was held scoreless, as the Blues lost to the Detroit Red Wings in the second round of the post-season.

Van Ryn began the 2002–03 with St. Louis. He struggled in his time with the Blues, as in 20 games, he did not score a goal and had three assists. The Blues sent Van Ryn down to the IceCats in December. With Worcester, Van Ryn scored two goals and 10 points in 33 games.

On March 11, 2003, the Blues traded Van Ryn to the Florida Panthers for Valeri Bure and Florida's fifth-round pick in the 2004 NHL entry draft.

==== Florida Panthers (2003–2008) ====
Van Ryn finished the 2002–03 season with the Florida Panthers' AHL affiliate, the San Antonio Rampage. In 11 games with the Rampage, Van Ryn earned three assists. In the playoffs, he had no points in three games.

In 2003–04, Van Ryn spent the entire season in the NHL with the Panthers. He made his Panthers debut on October 9, getting no points in a 3–1 win over the Carolina Hurricanes. On October 13, Van Ryn earned his first two points with the Panthers, both assists, in a 2–2 tie against the Carolina Hurricanes. He earned his first goal with the Panthers on October 15, scoring against Sean Burke of the Phoenix Coyotes in a 2–1 loss. On April 4, Van Ryn recorded his first career three point game, all assists, in a 6–6 tie against the Carolina Hurricanes. Van Ryn finished the season with 13 goals and 37 points in 79 games, the most by any Panthers defenseman, and third in overall team scoring. The Panthers failed to reach the post-season.

The 2004–05 NHL season was cancelled due to the 2004 NHL lockout.

Van Ryn returned to the Panthers for the 2005-06 season. On October 15, he earned three assists in a 3–2 victory over the Buffalo Sabres, and then on February 28, Van Ryn earned his third career three point game, earning three assists in a lopsided 8–2 win over the Tampa Bay Lightning. On April 18, Van Ryn scored his first multi-goal game, scoring both of the Panthers goals in a 2–1 win over the Atlanta Thrashers. In 80 games, Van Ryn scored eight goals and matched his career high 37 points, however, the club failed to reach the post-season.

In 2006–07, Van Ryn struggled offensively, scoring only four goals and 29 points in 78 games, as the Panthers once again failed to make the playoffs.

Van Ryn continued to struggle in the 2007–08 season, appearing in only 20 games, and earning two assists. His season was cut short due to wrist surgery.

On September 2, 2008, Van Ryn was traded to the Toronto Maple Leafs for Bryan McCabe and Toronto's fourth-round pick in the 2010 NHL entry draft.

==== Toronto Maple Leafs (2008–2010) ====
Van Ryn made his Maple Leafs debut on October 9, 2008, getting no points in a 3–2 win over the Detroit Red Wings. On October 11, Van Ryn earned his first point with Toronto, getting an assist in a 6–1 loss to the Montreal Canadiens. On October 23, he scored his first goal with the Maple Leafs, as he scored against Tim Thomas of the Boston Bruins in a 4–2 victory.

Van Ryn's time with the Leafs was injury plagued, as he only appeared in 27 games with Toronto, scoring three goals and 11 points. On October 22, 2009, Van Ryn underwent an osteotomy on his left knee. The surgery was a success in that it allowed Van Ryn to continue his day-to-day life. The Maple Leafs announced on June 30, 2010 that Van Ryn would not be playing in the 2010–11 season.

== Coaching career ==
=== Niagara IceDogs (2010–2011) ===
Van Ryn joined the Niagara IceDogs of the OHL as an assistant coach, working under Marty Williamson. In the 2010–11 season, the IceDogs finished in third place in the Eastern Conference with a 45–17–2–4 record, earning 96 points. In the post-season, Niagara lost to the Mississauga St. Michael's Majors in the Eastern Conference finals.

Following the season, Van Ryn left the IceDogs to join the Houston Aeros of the AHL.

=== Houston Aeros (2011–2013) ===
Van Ryn joined the Houston Aeros of the AHL as an assistant coach to the newly hired John Torchetti. Van Ryn was familiar with Torchetti as Torchetti was on the Florida Panthers' coaching staff when Van Ryn was a player. The Aeros were the AHL affiliate for the Minnesota Wild.

In his first season with the club in 2011–12, the Aeros finished the season with a 35–25–5–11 record, earning 86 points and fourth place in the West Division, earning a playoff berth. In the post-season, the Aeros lost to the Oklahoma City Barons in the first round.

Van Ryn stayed with the club for the 2012–13 season, as the Aeros again had a very solid regular season, finishing the year with a 40–26–5–5 record, earning 90 points and fourth place in the West Division. In the playoffs, Houston lost to the Grand Rapids Griffins in five games in the opening round.

=== Kitchener Rangers (2013–2016) ===
Van Ryn joined the Kitchener Rangers of the OHL as an associate coach in the summer of 2013, working with the Rangers' newly appointed head coach, Troy Smith.

The rebuilding club struggled in the 2013–14 season, finishing out of the playoffs with a 22–41–2–3 record, earning 49 points and a ninth-place finish in the Western Conference.

In 2014–15, Kitchener rebounded and finished the season with a 32-26-3-7 record, earning 74 points and sixth place in the conference. In the post-season, the Rangers lost to the London Knights in the first round. Following the year, Kitchener fired head coach Troy Smith, and replaced him with Van Ryn.

Van Ryn made his head coaching debut on September 25, 2015, as the Rangers lost to the Owen Sound Attack in overtime by a score of 5–4. In the Rangers next game on October 1, Van Ryn recorded his first victory, as Kitchener defeated the North Bay Battalion 4–2. Kitchener opened the season with a 13–0–3 record before Van Ryn suffered his first regulation defeat, when the Rangers lost 5–3 to the Kingston Frontenacs on November 7. The Rangers finished the season with a 44–17–5–2 record, earning 95 points and fourth place in the conference. In the post-season, the Rangers defeated the Windsor Spitfires in five games in the opening round of the playoffs, however, Kitchener was swept by the London Knights in the second round.

On May 9, 2016, Van Ryn stepped down as head coach of the Rangers after only one season.

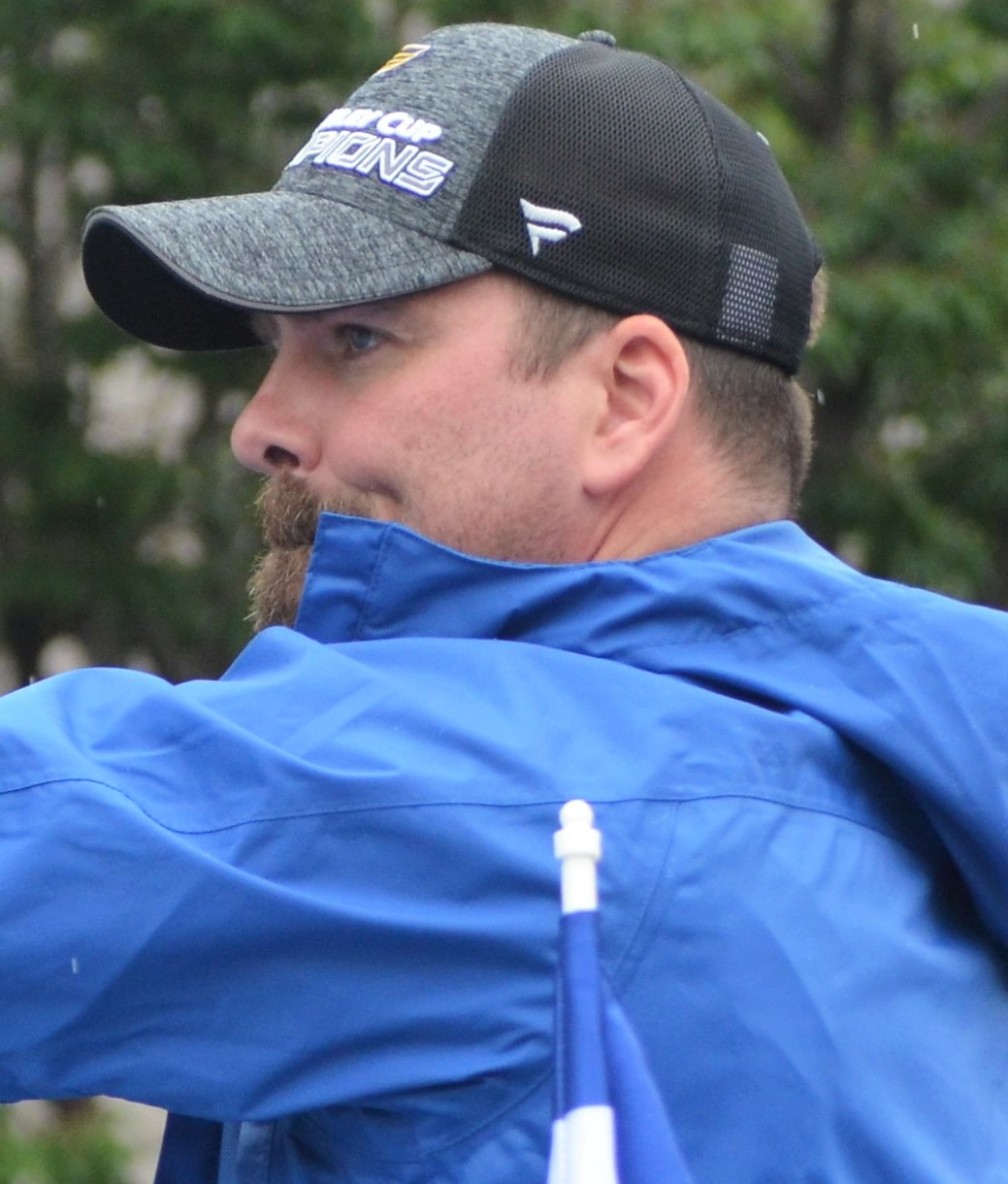
Van Ryn at the 2019 St. Louis Blues Stanley Cup Parade

=== Arizona Coyotes (2016–2018) ===
Van Ryn joined the Arizona Coyotes during the 2016 off-season as a player development coach. In the 2017 offseason, he was named coach of the Tucson Roadrunners, the Coyotes' American Hockey League affiliate. After the team finished in first place in the Pacific Division in his first season, he left the Coyotes' organization following the 2018 Calder Cup playoffs.

=== St. Louis Blues (2018–2023) ===
Van Ryn was named an assistant coach for the St. Louis Blues on May 30, 2018, to replace the departing Darryl Sydor. He won the Stanley Cup as a coach with the Blues in 2019. Van Ryn was fired following his 5th season with the Blues.

=== Toronto Maple Leafs (2023–present) ===
Following his firing from the St. Louis Blues, Van Ryn was hired by the Maple Leafs to be their assistant coach ahead of the 2023–24 season.

== Career statistics ==
=== Regular season and playoffs ===
			Regular season					Playoffs
Season	Team	League	GP	G	A	Pts	PIM	GP	G	A	Pts	PIM
1995–96	London Nationals	WOHL	44	9	14	23	24	—	—	—	—	—
1996–97	London Nationals	WOHL	46	14	31	45	32	—	—	—	—	—
1997–98	University of Michigan	CCHA	38	4	14	18	44	—	—	—	—	—
1998–99	University of Michigan	CCHA	37	10	13	23	52	—	—	—	—	—
1999–2000	Sarnia Sting	OHL	61	6	35	41	34	7	0	5	5	4
2000–01	Worcester IceCats	AHL	37	3	10	13	12	7	1	1	2	2
2000–01	St. Louis Blues	NHL	1	0	0	0	0	—	—	—	—	—
2001–02	Worcester IceCats	AHL	24	2	7	9	17	—	—	—	—	—
2001–02	St. Louis Blues	NHL	48	2	8	10	18	9	0	0	0	0
2002–03	St. Louis Blues	NHL	20	0	3	3	8	—	—	—	—	—
2002–03	Worcester IceCats	AHL	33	2	8	10	16	—	—	—	—	—
2002–03	San Antonio Rampage	AHL	11	0	3	3	20	3	0	0	0	0
2003–04	Florida Panthers	NHL	79	13	24	37	52	—	—	—	—	—
2005–06	Florida Panthers	NHL	80	8	29	37	90	—	—	—	—	—
2006–07	Florida Panthers	NHL	78	4	25	29	64	—	—	—	—	—
2007–08	Florida Panthers	NHL	20	0	2	2	14	—	—	—	—	—
2008–09	Toronto Maple Leafs	NHL	27	3	8	11	14	—	—	—	—	—
NHL totals			353	30	99	129	260	9	0	0	0	0

=== International ===
Mike Van Ryn
Medal record

Representing Canada

Ice hockey

World Junior Championships
Silver medal – second place	1999 Winnipeg	

Year	Team	Event	GP	G	A	Pts	PIM
1998	Canada	WJC	7	0	0	0	4
1999	Canada	WJC	7	0	1	1	4
Junior totals			14	0	1	1	4

=== Coaching record ===
Team	Year	Regular season							Postseason
Team	Year	G	W	L	T	OTL	Pts	Finish	Result
KIT	2015–16	68	44	17	5	2	95	3rd in Midwest	Won in conference quarter-finals (4-1 vs. WSR); Lost in conference semi-finals (0-4 vs. LDN)
TUC	2017–18	68	42	20	—	5	90	1st in Pacific	Won in division semi-finals (3-1 vs. SJ); Lost in division finals (1-4 vs. TEX)
OHL Totals		68	44	17	5	2	95	0 Division Titles	4-5 (0.444)
AHL Totals		68	42	20	—	5	90	1 Division Titles	4-5 (0.444)

== Awards and honours ==
Award	Year
All-CCHA Rookie Team	1997–98
CCHA All-Tournament Team	1999

Awards and achievements
Preceded by Jean-François Damphousse	New Jersey Devils first-round draft pick 1998	Succeeded by Scott Gomez
