= Matt Herr =

American ice hockey player (born 1976)

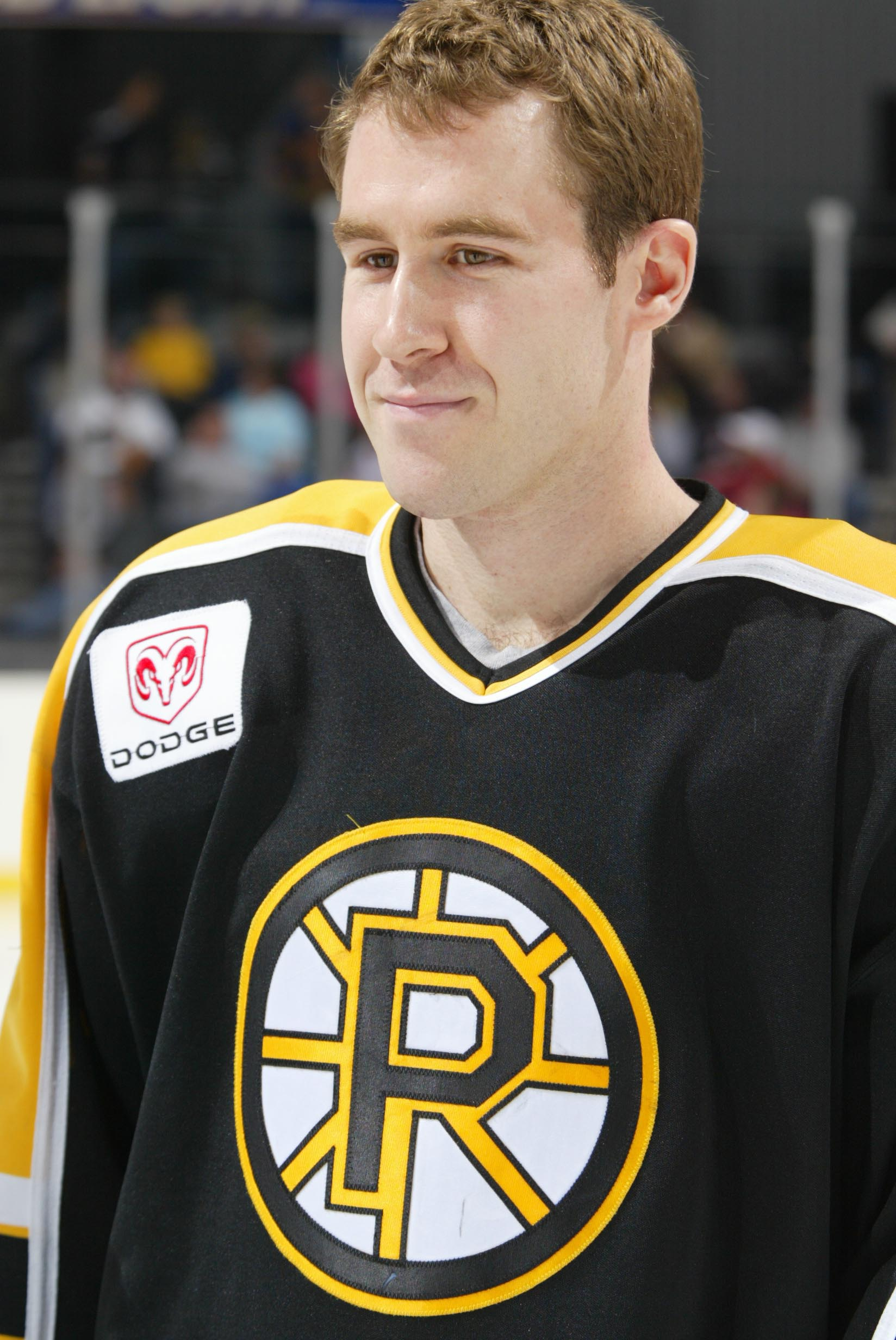
- Born: May 26, 1976 (age 50) Hackensack, New Jersey, U.S
- Height: 6 ft 1 in (185 cm)
- Weight: 205 lb (93 kg; 14 st 9 lb)
- Position: Center
- Shot: Left
- Played for: Washington Capitals; Florida Panthers; Boston Bruins; DEG Metro Stars
- NHL draft: 93rd overall, 1994; Washington Capitals
- Playing career: 1998–2005

Matthew Gregory Herr (born May 26, 1976) is an American former professional ice hockey forward who played for part of four National Hockey League (NHL) seasons.

== Playing career ==
Herr was born in Hackensack, New Jersey, and raised in Alpine, New Jersey As a youth, he played in the 1990 Quebec International Pee-Wee Hockey Tournament with the Tri-States Selects minor ice hockey team.

Herr lived in New Windsor, New York as a teenager and played before Newburgh Free Academy's club hockey team while in middle school. He later transferred to The Hotchkiss School in Lakeville, Connecticut, where he was captain of the hockey team.

Herr played his college hockey at the University of Michigan from 1994–98, where he was teammates with future NHL player Bill Muckalt. He helped the Michigan Wolverines win the 1996 and 1998 NCAA Division I Ice Hockey Championships. Herr also pitched for Michigan's baseball team from 1996–98 and was selected out of high school by the Atlanta Braves in the 29th round of the 1994 MLB draft.

Drafted by the Washington Capitals in the 1994 NHL entry draft, Herr also played for the Florida Panthers and Boston Bruins. During the 2004–05 NHL lockout, Herr played with the DEG Metro Stars and head coach Butch Goring in the Deutsche Eishockey Liga.

== International play ==
Internationally, Herr competed for the United States men's national junior ice hockey team at the 1996 World Junior Ice Hockey Championships.

== Personal ==
Herr has taught history and psychology, and has coached hockey and baseball at Kent School, in Kent, Connecticut.

Herr became the Executive Director of the UPMC Lemieux Sports Complex in Pittsburgh, Pennsylvania in May 2015. Since 2017, he has worked for the NHL as a Youth Hockey director.

In 2021, Herr became a Head Coach for the Washington Pride U14 Majors. The D.C. area’s only Tier 1 AAA Girls program. He led the team to a 24-20-6 record, and ended the season ranked #25 in the country.

Following in 2022, Herr coached the team to the USA Hockey National Tournament and one of the best records in Washington Pride 14u history.

== Career statistics ==
=== Regular season and playoffs ===
			Regular season					Playoffs
Season	Team	League	GP	G	A	Pts	PIM	GP	G	A	Pts	PIM
1990–91	Hotchkiss School	USHS	26	9	5	14	—	—	—	—	—	—
1991–92	Hotchkiss School	USHS	25	17	16	33	—	—	—	—	—	—
1992–93	Hotchkiss School	USHS	24	48	30	78	—	—	—	—	—	—
1993–94	Hotchkiss School	USHS	24	28	19	47	—	—	—	—	—	—
1994–95	University of Michigan	CCHA	37	11	8	19	51	—	—	—	—	—
1995–96	University of Michigan	CCHA	40	18	13	31	55	—	—	—	—	—
1996–97	University of Michigan	CCHA	43	29	23	52	67	—	—	—	—	—
1997–98	University of Michigan	CCHA	31	14	17	31	62	—	—	—	—	—
1998–99	Washington Capitals	NHL	30	2	2	4	8	—	—	—	—	—
1998–99	Portland Pirates	AHL	46	15	14	29	29	—	—	—	—	—
1999–00	Portland Pirates	AHL	77	22	21	43	51	4	1	1	2	4
2000–01	Portland Pirates	AHL	40	21	13	34	58	—	—	—	—	—
2000–01	Washington Capitals	NHL	22	2	3	5	17	—	—	—	—	—
2000–01	Philadelphia Phantoms	AHL	11	2	4	6	18	9	2	1	3	8
2001–02	Hershey Bears	AHL	61	18	16	34	68	7	1	2	3	15
2001–02	Florida Panthers	NHL	3	0	0	0	0	—	—	—	—	—
2002–03	Providence Bruins	AHL	77	34	38	72	146	4	0	1	1	12
2002–03	Boston Bruins	NHL	3	0	0	0	0	—	—	—	—	—
2003–04	Providence Bruins	AHL	71	18	26	44	108	2	0	1	1	0
2004–05	DEG Metro Stars	DEL	44	13	7	20	96	—	—	—	—	—
NHL totals			58	4	5	9	25	—	—	—	—	—

=== International ===
Year	Team	Event	Result	GP	G	A	Pts	PIM
1996	United States	WJC	5th	6	1	0	1	0
Junior totals				6	1	0	1	0

== Awards and honors ==
Award	Year
AHL
All-Star Game	2002, 2003, 2004
First All-Star Team	2003
