= St. Mary's College, Sault Ste. Marie, Ontario =

St. Mary's College
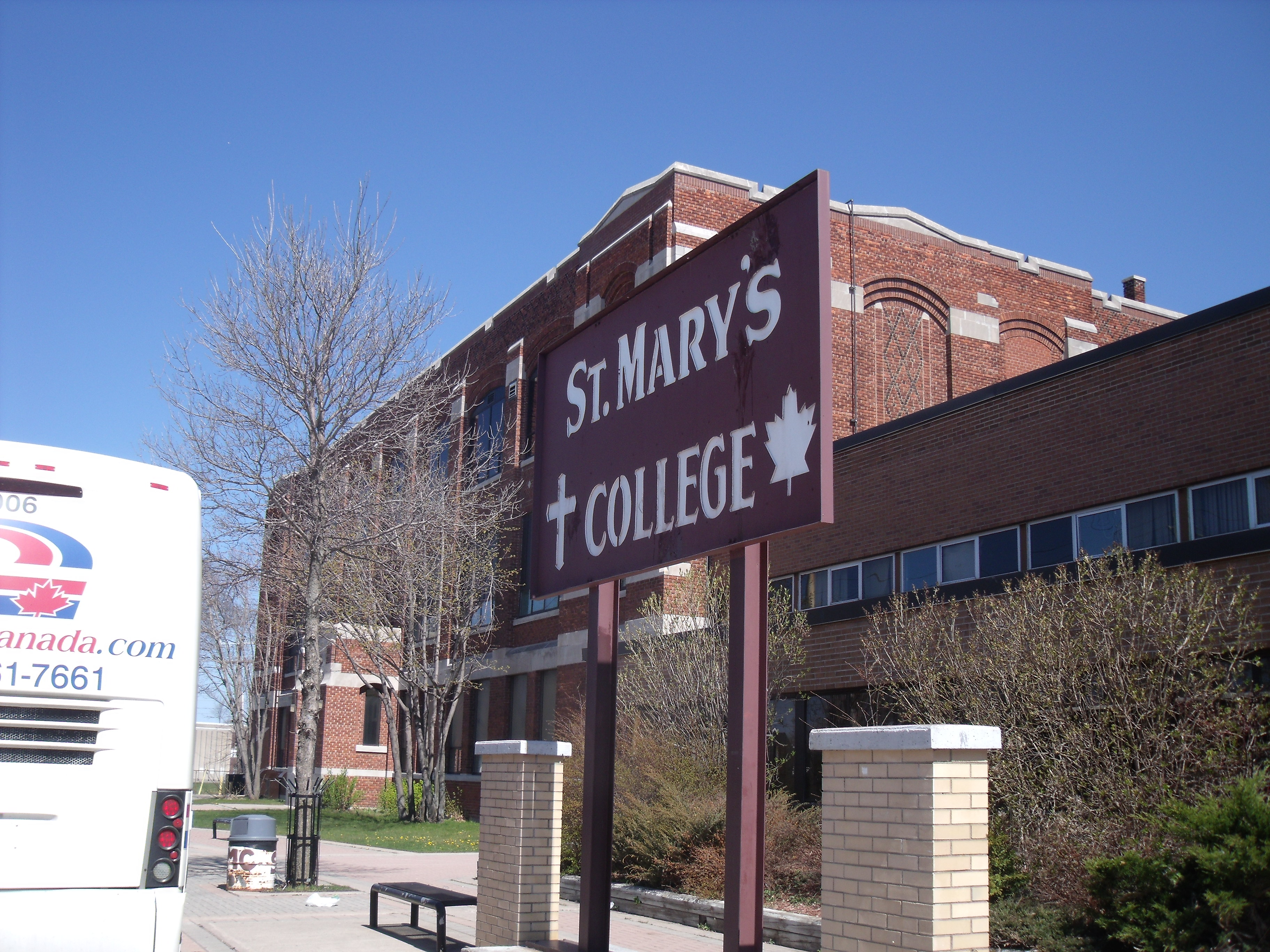

Location
- 868 Second Line East; Sault Ste. Marie, Ontario; Canada; 46.5402°N 84.3067°W

Information
- School type: Catholic High School
- Motto: Teach me Goodness, Discipline, and Knowledge
- Founded: 1956; 70 years ago
- School board: Huron-Superior Catholic District School Board
- Principal: Tiziana Palumbo
- Grades: 9-12
- Enrollment: 1000+
- Language: English, French
- Colours: Maroon, silver, black and white
- Mascot: Knight
- Team name: The Knights

St. Mary's College is a high school in Sault Ste. Marie, Ontario, Canada. It was established in 1956 by Basilian priests as an all-boys Catholic high school on St. Georges Avenue. As the school grew in popularity and size, St. Mary's began admitting girls in September 1987. That same year, the school moved into a new building (the former location of Lakeway Collegiate & Vocational School or Sault Technical and Commercial High School) built in 1921 on Wellington Street. In 2015, St. Mary's College combined with St. Basil Secondary School in a brand new building located on Second Line East.

== Notable alumni ==
- Matt D'Agostini – current NHL player
- Darnell Nurse – current NHL player
- Paul DiPietro – NHL player 1991-1997
- Brian Finley – NHL player 2005-2007
- Ron Francis – NHL player 1981-2004, two-time Stanley Cup Champion, both with the Pittsburgh Penguins
- Joe Fratesi – former Sault Ste. Marie Mayor, former Sault Ste. Marie CAO
- James Loney – peace activist who was held captive in Iraq for several months
- Carmen Provenzano – former Sault Ste. Marie MP
- Blake Speers – current NHL player
- Chris Thorburn – current NHL player
- Marty Turco – former NHL player
- Dennis Vial – NHL player 1990-1998

== See also ==
- Education in Ontario
- List of secondary schools in Ontario
