= Tommi Degerman =

Finnish ice hockey player (born 1976)

- Born: February 23, 1976 (age 50) Helsinki, Finland
- Height: 6 ft 1 in (185 cm)
- Weight: 201 lb (91 kg; 14 st 5 lb)
- Position: Centre
- Shot: Left
- Played for: Kiekko-Espoo/Blues
- NHL draft: 235th overall, 1997; Mighty Ducks of Anaheim
- Playing career: 1996–1997; 2000–2002

Tommi Degerman (born February 23, 1976) is a Finnish former professional ice hockey centre.

Degerman began his career with Kiekko-Espoo, playing in their U18 and U20 teams. During the 1996–97 season, he played twenty-three games for Kiekko-Espoo's senior team in SM-liiga and scored two goals, after which he put his professional career on hold and enrolled to Boston University. Degerman was selected 235th overall by the Mighty Ducks of Anaheim in the 1997 NHL entry draft but continued his college commitments with Boston University until 2000. After finishing his college career, Degerman rejoined his former team at Espoo which had now been renamed Espoo Blues. However, he only managed to play a single game for team and spent the season in Mestis for KJT. He returned to North America in 2001 to play in the ECHL, splitting the 2001-02 ECHL season with the New Orleans Brass and the Reading Royals before retiring.
