= Huron-Superior Catholic District School Board =

School board in Ontario, Canada

Location
- 100 Ontario Ave; Sault Ste. Marie, ON; P6B 1E3 Canada
- Coordinates: 46.51348°N 84.31374°W

District information
- Chair of the board: Gary Trembinski
- Schools: 16 elementary 2 secondary
- District ID: B29025

Students and staff
- Students: 5,000

Other information
- Elected trustees: 10
- Student trustees: 3
- Website: www.hscdsb.on.ca

The Huron-Superior Catholic District School Board (HSCDSB, known as English-language Separate District School Board No. 31 prior to 1999) is a separate school board for Sault Ste. Marie, Ontario, Canada, and surrounding communities.

== Secondary schools ==
=== Sault Ste. Marie ===
- Holy Angels Learning Centre
- St. Mary's College, Sault Ste. Marie

== Elementary schools ==
=== Blind River ===
- St. Mary's

=== Chapleau ===
- Our Lady of Fatima

=== Elliot Lake ===
- Our Lady of Fatima
- Our Lady of Lourdes French Immersion

=== Espanola ===
- Sacred Heart

=== Massey ===
- St. Mary School

=== Sault Ste. Marie ===
- Holy Family
- Our Lady of Lourdes
- St. Basil
- Holy Cross
- St. Mary's French Immersion
- St. Paul
- St. Francis French Immersion

=== Wawa ===
- St. Augustine

=== White River ===
- St. Basil

== See also ==
- List of school districts in Ontario
- List of high schools in Ontario
