= Andrew Berenzweig =

American ice hockey player

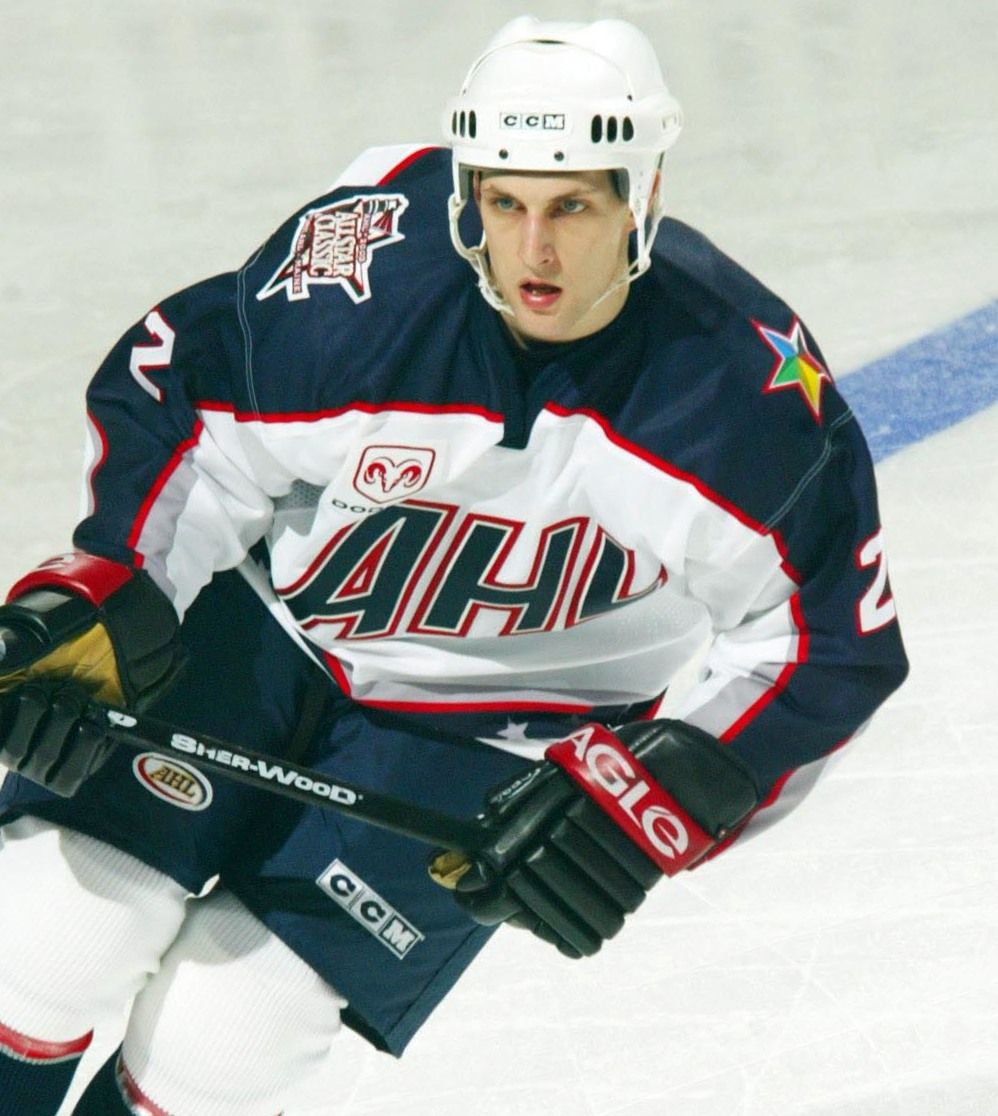
- Berenzweig during the 2003 AHL All-Star Game
- Born: August 8, 1977 (age 48) Arlington Heights, Illinois, U.S.
- Height: 6 ft 2 in (188 cm)
- Weight: 215 lb (98 kg; 15 st 5 lb)
- Position: Defense
- Shot: Left
- Played for: Nashville Predators
- NHL draft: 109th overall, 1996; New York Islanders
- Playing career: 1999–2004

Andrew David "Bubba" Berenzweig (born August 8, 1977) is an American former professional ice hockey player. He prepped at Loomis Chaffee School and played collegiately at the University of Michigan. He was drafted by the New York Islanders in the 1996 NHL entry draft.

== Playing career ==
Berenzweig was traded by the New York Islanders to the Nashville Predators in exchange for a fourth-round selection in the 1999 NHL entry draft. He was later traded to the Dallas Stars, who left him unprotected in the 2003 NHL Waiver Draft. Unselected by any teams, Berenzweig cleared waivers and was assigned to the Stars' minor league affiliate Utah Grizzlies. Berenzweig left the Grizzlies without permission and was suspended by the Stars for violating the terms of his contract.

== Personal life ==
Berenzweig is Jewish, and as of 2014, Berenzweig is working for insurance firm The Hylant Group.

== Career statistics ==
			Regular season					Playoffs
Season	Team	League	GP	G	A	Pts	PIM	GP	G	A	Pts	PIM
1995–96	University of Michigan	CCHA	42	4	8	12	4	—	—	—	—	—
1996–97	University of Michigan	CCHA	38	7	12	19	49	—	—	—	—	—
1997–98	University of Michigan	CCHA	45	8	11	19	32	—	—	—	—	—
1998–99	University of Michigan	CCHA	42	7	24	31	38	—	—	—	—	—
1999–00	Milwaukee Admirals	IHL	79	4	23	27	48	3	1	2	3	0
1999–00	Nashville Predators	NHL	2	0	0	0	0	—	—	—	—	—
2000–01	Milwaukee Admirals	IHL	72	10	26	36	38	5	0	4	4	4
2000–01	Nashville Predators	NHL	5	0	0	0	0	—	—	—	—	—
2001–02	Milwaukee Admirals	AHL	23	2	5	7	23	—	—	—	—	—
2001–02	Nashville Predators	NHL	26	3	7	10	14	—	—	—	—	—
2002–03	Nashville Predators	NHL	4	0	0	0	0	—	—	—	—	—
2002–03	Milwaukee Admirals	AHL	48	6	11	17	26	—	—	—	—	—
2002–03	Utah Grizzlies	AHL	26	6	11	17	4	1	0	0	0	0
2003–04	Utah Grizzlies	AHL	21	4	3	7	2	—	—	—	—	—
NHL totals			37	3	7	10	14	—	—	—	—	—

== Awards and honors ==
Award	Year
All-CCHA Second Team	1997-98
All-NCAA All-Tournament Team	1998

== See also ==
- List of select Jewish ice hockey players
