= Dan Cousineau =

Canadian ice hockey player and coach

- Born: May 22, 1975 (age 51) Halifax, Nova Scotia, Canada
- Height: 6 ft 0 in (183 cm)
- Weight: 205 lb (93 kg; 14 st 9 lb)
- Position: Defence
- Shot: Left
- Played for: ECHL; Columbus Chill; San Diego Gulls; CHL; Indianapolis Ice; WCHL; San Diego Gulls
- NHL draft: Undrafted
- Playing career: 1999–2004

Dan Cousineau (born May 22, 1975) is a Canadian former professional ice hockey defenceman. He is the head coach of the Major Bantam Ohio AAA Blue Jackets in the Tier 1 Elite Hockey League.

Cousineau attended Ohio State University where he played NCAA college hockey from 1994 to 1999 with the Ohio State Buckeyes, scoring 14 goals and 34 assists for 48 points while earning 257 penalty minutes in 138 games played. In his childhood, he played AAA for the Gloucester Rangers in Ottawa and in Waterloo, Ontario.

Cousineau went on to play five years of professional hockey, including three seasons spent with the Indianapolis Ice of the Central Hockey League (CHL) with whom he won the 1999–2000 CHL championship in his rookie season. He also won a Taylor Cup with the San Diego Gulls in 2003, the last season that the team played in the WCHL.
