= Marty Turco =

Canadian ice hockey player (born 1975)

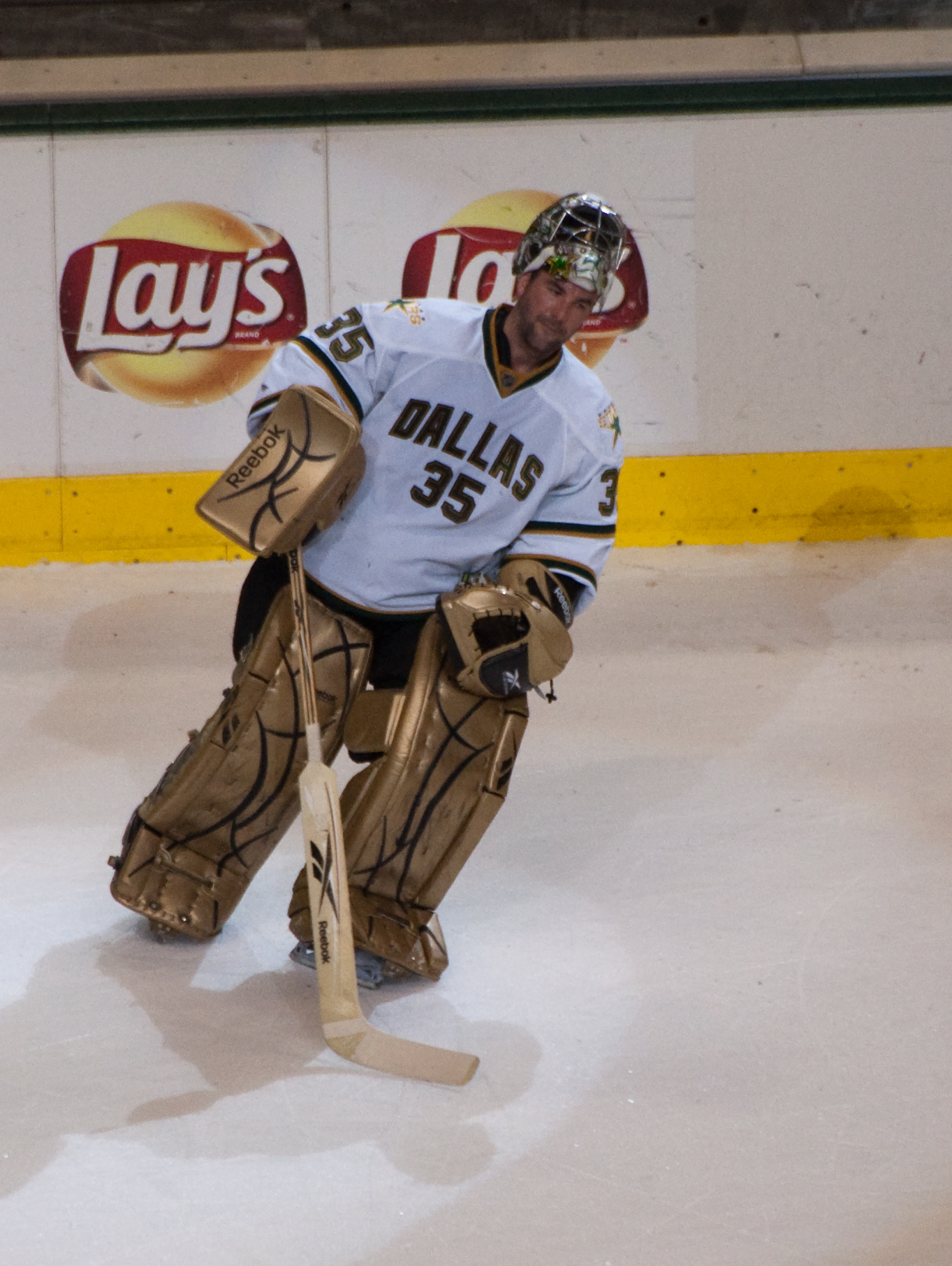
- Turco with the Dallas Stars in February 2009
- Born: August 13, 1975 (age 51) Sault Ste. Marie, Ontario, Canada
- Height: 5 ft 11 in (180 cm)
- Weight: 184 lb (83 kg; 13 st 2 lb)
- Position: Goaltender
- Caught: Left
- Played for: Dallas Stars; Chicago Blackhawks; Boston Bruins
- National team: Canada
- NHL draft: 124th overall, 1994; Dallas Stars
- Playing career: 1998–2012
Medal record
Representing Canada
World Championships
| Silver medal – second place | 2005 Austria |

Marty Vincent Turco (born August 13, 1975) is a Canadian former professional ice hockey goaltender who played 11 seasons in the National Hockey League (NHL). He played nine seasons with the Dallas Stars and one each with the Chicago Blackhawks and Boston Bruins. Due to his puck-handling prowess, Canadian hockey personality Don Cherry named Turco "the smartest goalie in the NHL". Turco currently serves as an in-studio analyst at NHL Network.

== Playing career ==
=== Early career ===
After playing minor hockey for the S.S. Marie Legion program in his hometown, Turco was undrafted by the Ontario Hockey League (OHL). He signed as a 17-year-old with the Cambridge Winterhawks Jr. B. team in 1992 and played two seasons with the Ontario Hockey Association (OHA) team before accepting an NCAA scholarship to play college hockey for the University of Michigan, a member of the Central Collegiate Hockey Association (CCHA). At Michigan, Turco won two NCAA championships.

Turco was drafted in the fifth round of the 1994 NHL entry draft by the Dallas Stars and went on to play for Michigan that fall. Turco earned many awards in his four years at Michigan, including Rookie of the Year in 1995, Tournament MVP in 1998 and nominations to the first All-Star team in 1997, the second All-Star team in 1998 and the All-Tournament Team in 1996 and 1998. After graduating, Turco went to play for Dallas' International Hockey League (IHL) affiliate, the Kalamazoo Wings. In 1999, he was named IHL Rookie of the Year.

=== Dallas Stars (2000–2010) ===
After two years playing for the K-Wings, Turco was given the opportunity to be a backup for Ed Belfour in Dallas. He spent the next two years with the Stars gaining experience as the team's backup. After the 2001–02 season, Dallas decided to make Turco the starting goaltender, allowing Belfour to sign with the Toronto Maple Leafs.

In his first year as the starting goaltender, 2002–03, Turco's goals against average (GAA) of 1.72 set a modern NHL record. (Miikka Kiprusoff broke Turco's record the next season with a 1.69 GAA.) Turco played in the NHL All-Star Game during the season and was named to the second All-Star team following the season, finishing second in Vezina Trophy voting as well, behind Martin Brodeur, for the NHL's top regular season goaltender. His .932 save percentage was also best in the NHL that year. However, he was unable to lead the Stars past the Mighty Ducks of Anaheim in the Western Conference Semifinals of the 2003 Stanley Cup playoffs.

During the 2003–04 season, Turco continued to give the Stars quality goaltending, again playing (and starting) in the All-Star Game. The Stars lost to the Colorado Avalanche in the first round of the 2004 playoffs.

In the 2005–06 season, Turco won a career-best 41 games, eight of them in shootouts. Turco's experience in the 2006 playoffs was similar to the prior season, again losing in five games to the Avalanche.

On April 13, 2007, in the Stars' first and only playoff series of the 2006–07 season, Turco recorded his first ever playoff shutout against the Vancouver Canucks to tie the series 1–1. After the game, he said, "We know we can beat these guys here [Vancouver], or at home, or anywhere."

Turco went on to lose against the Canucks at home in Game 3, dropping a 2–1 overtime victory, when Taylor Pyatt got a quick one-time shot off a feed from Bryan Smolinski. In Game 4, once again the Stars could not put up a win, losing to the Canucks 2–1 off of goals from Mattias Öhlund, then the game winner from Trevor Linden. The Stars then went on to win Game 5 in the series with 1–0 overtime win. Brenden Morrow scored the game's only goal 6:22 into the first overtime period, allowing Turco to earn his second career playoff shutout. Turco followed this up with his third shutout of the series in a 2–0 Game 6 win. The series ended in Game 7 on April 23, 2007; the Canucks won 4–1 after scoring four unanswered goals to break Marty Turco's shutout streak at 165 minutes and 45 seconds, with Trevor Linden again scoring the eventual game-winner in the second period.

The three shutouts posted by Turco in that series represent a record amount of shutouts in a single playoff series, a mark that has been tied by the New Jersey Devils' Martin Brodeur, Anaheim's Jean-Sébastien Giguère and the Philadelphia Flyers' Michael Leighton.

Turco recorded 32 wins in the 2007–08 season and helped the Stars to playoff wins over the defending Stanley Cup champions Anaheim and the San Jose Sharks, before losing in six games to the Detroit Red Wings in the Western Conference Finals.

On January 15, 2009, Turco recorded his 421st game for the Stars, becoming the franchise's all-time leader in games played by a goaltender, surpassing Cesare Maniago's near 33-year old record of 420. He would also pass Maniago later that month in total minutes played, on January 29, while also winning his first regular season game at Joe Louis Arena in 11 tries against the Detroit Red Wings. On February 9, he again broke yet another of Maniago's records by starting in his 24th consecutive game in goal. However, the Stars failed to qualify for the playoffs. On April 13, 2010, it was reported Turco would not be re-signed by Dallas, ending his nine years with the Stars.

=== Chicago Blackhawks (2010–2011) ===
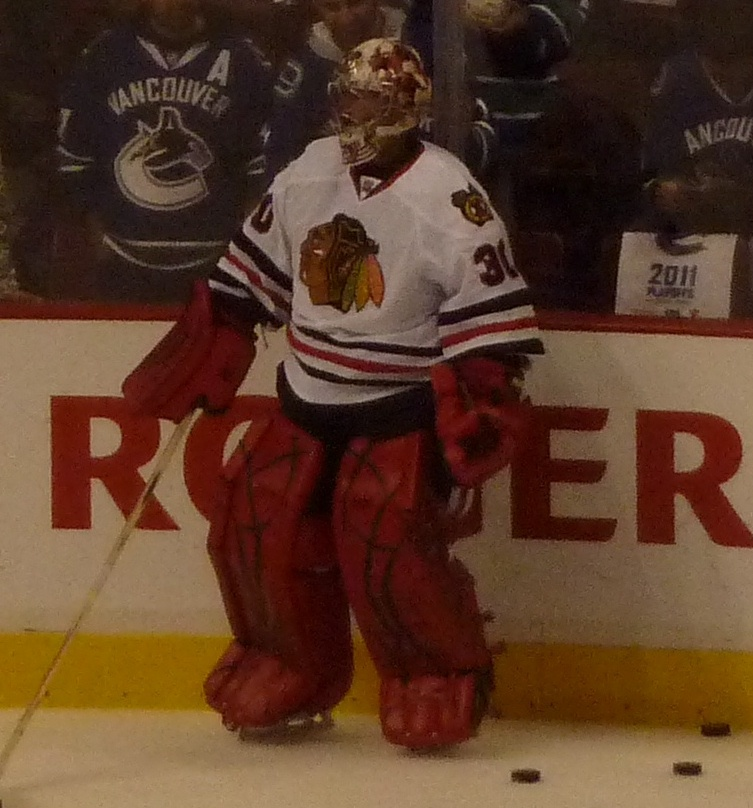
Turco as a member of the Chicago Blackhawks in April 2011

On August 2, 2010, Turco signed a one-year contract as a free agent with the reigning Stanley Cup champion, the Chicago Blackhawks, replacing Antti Niemi as their starting goaltender. The Blackhawks had previously beaten the Philadelphia Flyers in six games in the 2010 Stanley Cup Finals. His first win with Chicago came on October 15, a 5–2 victory over the Columbus Blue Jackets. As the 2010–11 season went on, Corey Crawford would take over as the starting goaltender. Turco ultimately saw action in 29 games, compiling an 11–11–3 record.

=== EC Red Bull Salzburg ===
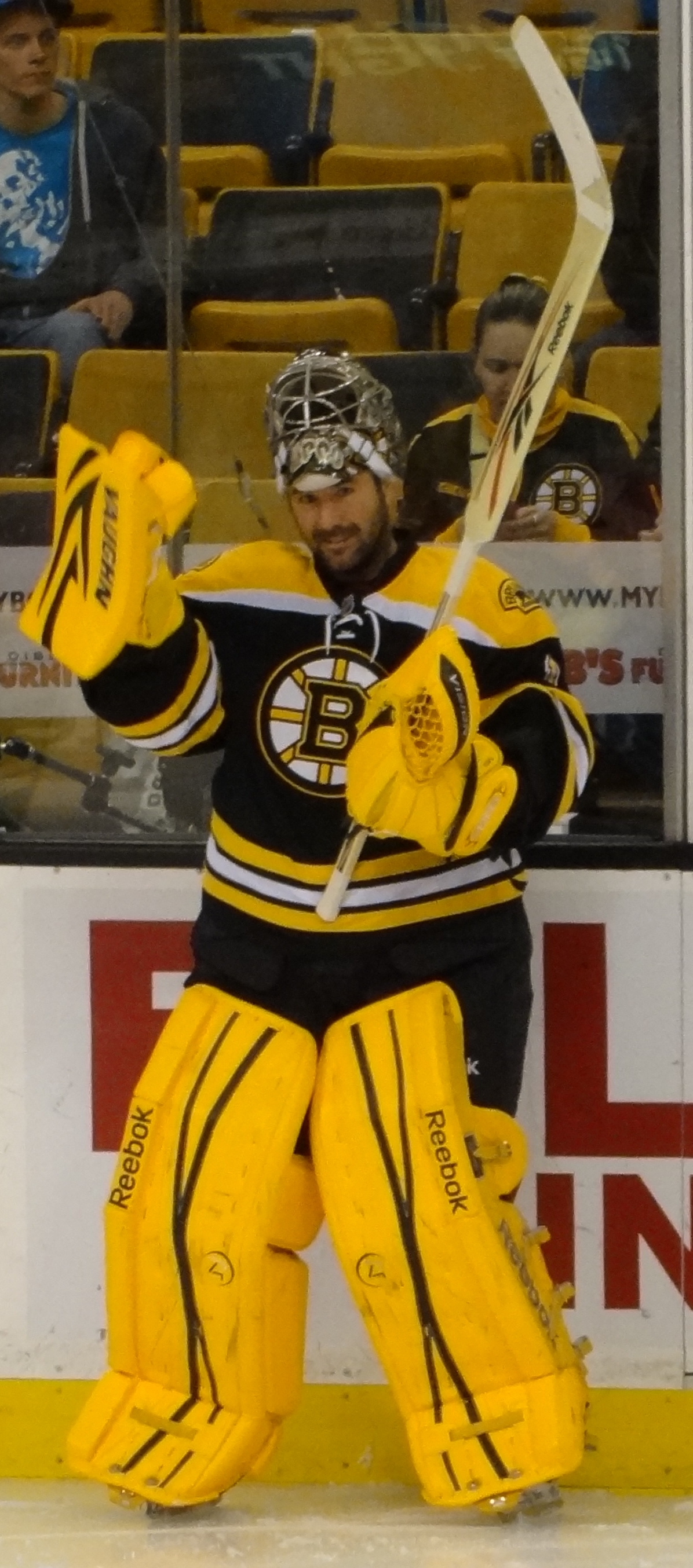
Turco with the Boston Bruins in March 2012.

In December 2011, Turco signed a contract with EC Red Bull Salzburg of the Austrian Erste Bank Eishockey Liga (EBEL). It was a short-term contract and Turco was only expected to play December 16 and 18 in the European Trophy Finals/Red Bull Salute. However, the following month, he signed a subsequent contract with EC Salzburg lasting through the end of the EBEL season, including an "NHL-out" clause that lasted until the NHL trade deadline, which occurred on February 27.

=== Boston Bruins (2011–2012) ===
On March 5, 2012, Turco signed a contract with the Boston Bruins. He cleared waivers on March 7 and joined the Bruins. He was signed after it was learned that the Bruins' back-up goaltender, Tuukka Rask, would be out four-to-six weeks with a lower abdominal strain. Because he was signed after the NHL trade deadline, Turco was not eligible to participate in the 2012 playoffs.

== International play ==
Turco played for Team Canada at the 2002 World Championship, he won a silver medal in 2005 but did not play. He suited up at the 2006 Winter Olympics as a third goalie.

Turco would play for Canada at the 2011 Spengler Cup.

== Television ==
Before signing with EC Salzburg, Turco worked as an analyst for the NHL Network, providing in-studio analysis during the show On the Fly. Turco joined NHL Network's team after the Blackhawks were eliminated by the Vancouver Canucks during the 2011 playoffs. Turco said a full-time job in television might be in his future, but that he would like to play again and was not ready to retire. Turco joined Team Canada for the 2011 Spengler Cup after not playing regularly for nine months.

Turco also appeared in two commercials for the NHL. In a 2006 commercial for the NHL's "Game On!" promotion, Turco can be seen in back of a family's car to remind the father that the NHL season is starting. Turco can also be seen in the NHL's "Road Trip" commercial, which was debuted during the 2007 NHL All-Star Game in Dallas. Turco can be seen sleeping as fellow goaltenders Roberto Luongo and Ryan Miller set him up to cover himself in shaving cream as a result of a prank.

== Personal life ==
Turco and his wife Kelly have two daughters, Hailey (born early 2002) and Katelyn (born April 2004), and one son, Finley (born August 2008).

== Career statistics ==
=== Regular season and playoffs ===
| | | | Regular season | | | | | | | | | | Playoffs |
| Season | Team | League | GP | W | L | T | OTL | MIN | GA | SO | GAA | SV% | GP | W | L | MIN | GA | SO | GAA | SV% |
|---|---|---|---|---|---|---|---|---|---|---|---|---|---|---|---|---|---|---|---|---|
| 1992–93 | Sault Ste. Marie North Stars | GNML | — | — | — | — | — | — | — | — | — | — | — | — | — | — | — | — | — | — |
| 1993–94 | St. Mary's College | HS-ON | — | — | — | — | — | — | — | — | — | — | — | — | — | — | — | — | — | — |
| 1993–94 | Cambridge Winter Hawks | MWJHL | 34 | — | — | — | — | 1937 | 114 | — | 3.53 | — | — | — | — | — | — | — | — | — |
| 1994–95 | University of Michigan | CCHA | 37 | 27 | 7 | 1 | — | 2063 | 95 | 1 | 2.76 | .894 | — | — | — | — | — | — | — | — |
| 1995–96 | University of Michigan | CCHA | 42 | 34 | 7 | 1 | — | 2335 | 84 | 5 | 2.16 | .896 | — | — | — | — | — | — | — | — |
| 1996–97 | University of Michigan | CCHA | 41 | 33 | 4 | 4 | — | 2296 | 87 | 4 | 2.27 | .894 | — | — | — | — | — | — | — | — |
| 1997–98 | University of Michigan | CCHA | 45 | 33 | 10 | 1 | — | 2639 | 95 | 4 | 2.16 | .907 | — | — | — | — | — | — | — | — |
| 1998–99 | Michigan K-Wings | IHL | 54 | 24 | 17 | 10 | — | 3127 | 136 | 1 | 2.61 | .920 | 5 | 2 | 3 | 300 | 14 | 0 | 2.80 | .918 |
| 1999–00 | Michigan K-Wings | IHL | 60 | 23 | 27 | 7 | — | 3399 | 139 | 7 | 2.45 | .916 | — | — | — | — | — | — | — | — |
| 2000–01 | Dallas Stars | NHL | 26 | 13 | 6 | 1 | — | 1266 | 40 | 3 | 1.90 | .925 | — | — | — | — | — | — | — | — |
| 2001–02 | Dallas Stars | NHL | 31 | 15 | 6 | 2 | — | 1519 | 53 | 2 | 2.09 | .921 | — | — | — | — | — | — | — | — |
| 2002–03 | Dallas Stars | NHL | 55 | 31 | 10 | 10 | — | 3203 | 92 | 7 | 1.72 | .932 | 12 | 6 | 6 | 798 | 25 | 0 | 1.87 | .919 |
| 2003–04 | Dallas Stars | NHL | 73 | 37 | 21 | 13 | — | 4359 | 144 | 9 | 1.98 | .913 | 5 | 1 | 4 | 325 | 18 | 0 | 3.32 | .849 |
| 2004–05 | Djurgårdens IF | SEL | 6 | — | — | — | — | 356 | 12 | 1 | 2.02 | .932 | — | — | — | — | — | — | — | — |
| 2005–06 | Dallas Stars | NHL | 68 | 41 | 19 | — | 5 | 3910 | 166 | 3 | 2.55 | .898 | 5 | 1 | 4 | 319 | 18 | 0 | 3.38 | .868 |
| 2006–07 | Dallas Stars | NHL | 67 | 38 | 20 | — | 5 | 3763 | 140 | 6 | 2.23 | .910 | 7 | 3 | 4 | 509 | 11 | 3 | 1.30 | .952 |
| 2007–08 | Dallas Stars | NHL | 62 | 32 | 21 | — | 6 | 3628 | 140 | 3 | 2.31 | .909 | 18 | 10 | 8 | 1152 | 40 | 1 | 2.08 | .922 |
| 2008–09 | Dallas Stars | NHL | 74 | 33 | 31 | — | 10 | 4327 | 203 | 3 | 2.81 | .898 | — | — | — | — | — | — | — | — |
| 2009–10 | Dallas Stars | NHL | 53 | 22 | 20 | — | 11 | 3088 | 140 | 4 | 2.72 | .913 | — | — | — | — | — | — | — | — |
| 2010–11 | Chicago Blackhawks | NHL | 29 | 11 | 11 | — | 3 | 1631 | 82 | 1 | 3.02 | .897 | — | — | — | — | — | — | — | — |
| 2011–12 | EC Red Bull Salzburg | EBEL | 10 | 6 | 2 | — | 2 | 250 | 12 | 0 | 2.88 | .918 | — | — | — | — | — | — | — | — |
| 2011–12 | Boston Bruins | NHL | 5 | 2 | 2 | — | 0 | 261 | 16 | 0 | 3.68 | .855 | — | — | — | — | — | — | — | — |
| NHL totals | | | 543 | 275 | 167 | 26 | 40 | 30,955 | 1,216 | 41 | 2.36 | .910 | 47 | 21 | 26 | 3,103 | 112 | 4 | 2.17 | .914 |

=== International ===
| Year | Team | Event | GP | W | L | T | MIN | GA | SO | GAA | SV% |
|---|---|---|---|---|---|---|---|---|---|---|---|
| 2002 | Canada | WC | 3 | 2 | 1 | 0 | 166 | 4 | 1 | 1.45 | .947 |
| 2005 | Canada | WC | — | — | — | — | — | — | — | — | — |
| 2006 | Canada | OG | — | — | — | — | — | — | — | — | — |
| Senior totals | | | 3 | 2 | 1 | 0 | 166 | 4 | 1 | 1.45 | .947 |

== Awards and honours ==
| Award | Year |
College
| CCHA Rookie of the Year | 1995 |
| CCHA All-Rookie Team | 1995 |
| NCAA Champion | 1996, 1998 |
| NCAA All-Tournament Team | 1996, 1998 |
| CCHA first All-Star team | 1997 |
| AHCA West First All-American Team | 1997 |
| CCHA second All-Star team | 1998 |
| Most Outstanding Player | 1998 |
NHL
| Roger Crozier Saving Grace Award | 2001, 2003 |
| All-Star Game | 2003, 2004, 2007 |
| Second All-Star team | 2003 |
| Foundation Player Award | 2006 |
| NHL 2K cover athlete | 2006 |

=== Records ===
==== NCAA ====
- All-time NCAA wins record (127).

==== NHL ====
- Most shutouts in a playoff series (3, 2007; tied with Félix Potvin, Ed Belfour, Martin Brodeur, Jean-Sébastien Giguère, Nikolai Khabibulin, and Michael Leighton)

==== Dallas Stars ====
- Most wins (262)
- Most shutouts (40)
- Most games played (509)
- Most minutes played by a goaltender (29,065)
- Most assists by a goalie (22)
- Most consecutive games played by a goaltender
- Lowest Goals Against Average in a season (1.72; 2002–03)

Awards and achievements
| Preceded by Brendan Morrison | CCHA Rookie of the Year; 1994–95 | Succeeded by Marc Magliarditi |
| Preceded by Matt Henderson | NCAA Tournament Most Outstanding Player; 1998 | Succeeded by Alfie Michaud |
| Preceded by Ed Belfour; José Théodore | Winner of the Crozier Award; 2001; 2003 | Succeeded by José Théodore; Dwayne Roloson |
