= Bill Muckalt =

Canadian ice hockey player

- Born: July 15, 1974 (age 52) Surrey, British Columbia, Canada
- Height: 6 ft 0 in (183 cm)
- Weight: 200 lb (91 kg; 14 st 4 lb)
- Position: Right wing
- Shot: Right
- Played for: Vancouver Canucks; New York Islanders; Ottawa Senators; Minnesota Wild
- NHL draft: 221st overall, 1994; Vancouver Canucks Coaching career

Current position
- Title: Head coach
- Team: Michigan Tech
- Conference: CCHA
- Record: 23–13–3 (.628)

Biographical details
- Education: Michigan

Playing career
- 1994–1998: Michigan

Coaching career (HC unless noted)
- 2006–2007: Eastern Michigan (assistant)
- 2007–2008: Eastern Michigan
- 2008–2010: Valencia Flyers
- 2010–2011: New Mexico Mustangs
- 2011–2015: Michigan Tech (assistant)
- 2015–2017: Tri-City Storm
- 2017–2023: Michigan (AHC)
- 2024–2025: Lindenwood
- 2025–present: Michigan Tech

Administrative career (AD unless noted)
- 2015–2017: Tri-City Storm (GM)

Head coaching record
- Overall: 31–35–5 (.472)
- Playing career: 1998–2004

William Raymond Muckalt (born July 15, 1974) is a Canadian former professional ice hockey player who is currently the head coach at Michigan Tech. He was previously the associate head coach at Michigan. He was the head coach and general manager of the Tri-City Storm of the United States Hockey League (USHL). Muckalt played in the National Hockey League (NHL) for the Vancouver Canucks, New York Islanders, Ottawa Senators and Minnesota Wild from 1998 until 2003. In 2016, Muckalt led the Tri-City Storm to its first Clark Cup during his first season as head coach and general manager.

== Career ==
=== Playing career ===
Muckalt played Junior A in the British Columbia Junior Hockey League (BCJHL) with the Merritt Centennials and briefly with the Kelowna Spartans before joining the American college ranks with the University of Michigan of the Central Collegiate Hockey Association (CCHA) in 1994. While with Merritt, Muckalt delivered a check from behind that rendered the opposing player a quadriplegic. Muckalt played four years for the Michigan Wolverines and was named to the CCHA and NCAA West First All-Star Teams in his senior year in 1998. The school won two NCAA titles while Muckalt was a sophomore in 1996 and a senior in 1998. The 1996 championship team also featured future NHLers Brendan Morrison, Jason Botterill and goalie Marty Turco.

Muckalt was selected in the ninth round (221st overall) of the 1994 NHL entry draft by his hometown Vancouver Canucks. He played his first NHL game with the Canucks on October 12, 1998, against the Los Angeles Kings, notching his first NHL point as well, an assist. Muckalt scored his first NHL goal on October 20 against the Carolina Hurricanes. He played in 73 games during his rookie season, scoring 16 goals and 36 points. Muckalt was traded to the New York Islanders along with Dave Scatchard and goalie Kevin Weekes in exchange for goalie Felix Potvin and draft picks midway through the 1999–2000 season on December 19, 1999. Shortly after debuting with the Islanders, however, he was sidelined for the remainder of the season with a shoulder injury sustained in a game against the Tampa Bay Lightning on January 13, 2000. After a full season with the Islanders in 2000–01, he was involved in a blockbuster trade with the Ottawa Senators on June 23, 2001. Muckalt was dealt to Ottawa along with up-and-coming defenceman Zdeno Chara and the Islanders' first-round pick in 2001 (which Ottawa would subsequently use to select Jason Spezza) in exchange for star centre Alexei Yashin.

Muckalt spent only one season with Ottawa, registering no goals and eight assists in 70 games, before signing as a free agent with the Minnesota Wild on July 3, 2002. He registered five goals and eight points in his first five games with Minnesota before dislocating his right shoulder in a game against the Calgary Flames on October 22, 2002. The injury was severe enough to end Muckalt's season and keep him sidelined for the majority of the next as well.

He would not play another regular season NHL game, though he did attempt a comeback with the American Hockey League (AHL)'s Houston Aeros, registering three assists in nine games in 2003–04. In 2006, Muckalt signed as a free agent with Russian club Vityaz Chekhov, he never played a game for the team.

=== Coaching career ===
Muckalt began his coaching career as an assistant with the Eastern Michigan Eagles in 2006–07, moving up to head coach the following year. In 2009–10, Muckalt served as head coach of the Valencia Flyers of the Western States Hockey League, guiding the team to a 23–21–5 record and a fifth-place finish in the WSHL Western Division. On March 28, 2010, he was named head coach of the New Mexico Mustangs, a North American Hockey League (NAHL) expansion team. Muckalt led the development of the franchise's coaching, recruiting and scouting systems. With 21 rookies on the roster, the Mustangs went 19–35–4 in their first year, winning 15 of their last 27 games. In the off-season, he accepted a position as an assistant coach with Michigan Tech of the NCAA Division I Western Collegiate Hockey Association, and served as an assistant coach from 2011 to 2015.

During 2014–15, Muckalt helped Michigan Tech to a 29-10-2 record, tied for the most wins in college hockey, and a berth in the NCAA Tournament. The campaign marked the first 20-win season for MTU since the 1982-83 year. Michigan Tech had a No. 1 national ranking for the first time since 1976 and boasted the largest goal differential in Division I hockey, finishing second in goals against average (1.80) and fifth in goals per game (3.51).

With Michigan Tech, Muckalt coached Tanner Kero, the 2014-15 WCHA Player of the Year, who signed with the Chicago Blackhawks. Others from MTU to sign pro contracts were Blake Peitila, with the New Jersey Devils; and former Storm goaltender Pheonix Copley, with the Washington Capitals.

In July 2015, Muckalt was named head coach of the USHL's Tri-City Storm. In his first season, he led the Storm to its first Clark Cup, sweeping the Dubuque Fighting Saints in three games. He was the seventh coach in Tri-City Storm history.

The Storm ran through the 2016 postseason with a 9–2 record, sweeping Sioux Falls, beating Waterloo in five games and dispatching Dubuque, 3–0, in the Clark Cup Final. He became the fifth coach in the Tier-1 History of the USHL (since 2002–03) to win a championship in the first season as head coach, joining Jeff Blashill (2009, Indiana), Jim Montgomery (2011, Dubuque), Derek LaLonde (2012, Green Bay) and Jeff Brown (2014, Indiana). The series wins helped the Storm rid it of some previous demons; Sioux Falls had eliminated the Storm from the postseason in 2014-15 and Waterloo beat Tri-City in the 2004 Clark Cup Final.

In the 2015–16 regular season, the Storm went 28-15-10-7 (73 points) and clinched the Western Conference regular season title for the second time. Muckalt instituted a balanced team; Tri-City finished seventh in goals for (3.05 GF/GM), seventh in goals against (2.73 GA/GM), third on the power play (20.8%) and sixth on the penalty kill (84.4%). The Storm went on a team-record 13-game point streak from February 12 - March 19. The run moved Tri-City into first place in its conference.

Muckalt presided over the development of Carson Meyer, the team's leading goal scorer (32) and Wade Allison, who won Clark Cup MVP with a league-best nine goals in the postseason. Goaltender Jake Kielly set the Storm's postseason record with a 1.64 goals against average and a .950 save percentage.

On June 20, 2017, Muckalt was named associate head coach for Michigan. On May 3, 2023, Muckalt and Michigan agreed to mutually part ways after six years.

On April 23, 2024, Muckalt was named head coach for Lindenwood. During the 2024–25 season, in his first season at Lindenwood, he led the Lions to an 8–22–2 record. His time with the team didn't last long as Muckalt was hired by Michigan Tech for the same position on May 22, 2025.

== Awards and honours ==
Award	Year
All-CCHA Rookie Team	1994–95
All-CCHA First Team	1997–98
AHCA West First-Team All-American	1997–98

== Career statistics ==
			Regular season					Playoffs
Season	Team	League	GP	G	A	Pts	PIM	GP	G	A	Pts	PIM
1992–93	Merritt Centennials	BCJHL	59	31	43	74	80	—	—	—	—	—
1993–94	Merritt Centennials	BCJHL	57	70	61	131	119	—	—	—	—	—
1994–95	University of Michigan	CCHA	39	19	18	37	42	—	—	—	—	—
1995–96	University of Michigan	CCHA	41	28	30	58	34	—	—	—	—	—
1996–97	University of Michigan	CCHA	36	26	38	64	69	—	—	—	—	—
1997–98	University of Michigan	CCHA	46	32	35	67	94	—	—	—	—	—
1998–99	Vancouver Canucks	NHL	73	16	20	36	98	—	—	—	—	—
1999–2000	Vancouver Canucks	NHL	33	4	8	12	17	—	—	—	—	—
1999–2000	New York Islanders	NHL	12	4	3	7	4	—	—	—	—	—
2000–01	New York Islanders	NHL	60	11	15	26	33	—	—	—	—	—
2001–02	Ottawa Senators	NHL	70	0	8	8	46	—	—	—	—	—
2002–03	Minnesota Wild	NHL	8	5	3	8	6	5	0	0	0	0
2003–04	Houston Aeros	AHL	9	0	3	3	6	—	—	—	—	—
NHL totals			256	40	57	97	204	5	0	0	0	0
CCHA totals			162	114	121	225	239	—	—	—	—	—

== Head coaching record ==
Record table
Season	Coach	Overall	Conference	Standing	Postseason
Lindenwood Lions Independent (2024–2025)
2024–25	Lindenwood	8–22–2			
Lindenwood:		8–22–2			
Michigan Tech Huskies (CCHA) (2025–present)
2025–26	Michigan Tech	23–13–3	16–7–3	T–4th	CCHA Semifinals
Michigan Tech:		23–13–3	16–7–3		
Total:		31–35–5			
National champion Postseason invitational champion Conference regular season champion Conference regular season and conference tournament champion Division regular season champion Division regular season and conference tournament champion Conference tournament champion
