= Josh Langfeld =

American ice hockey player (born 1977)

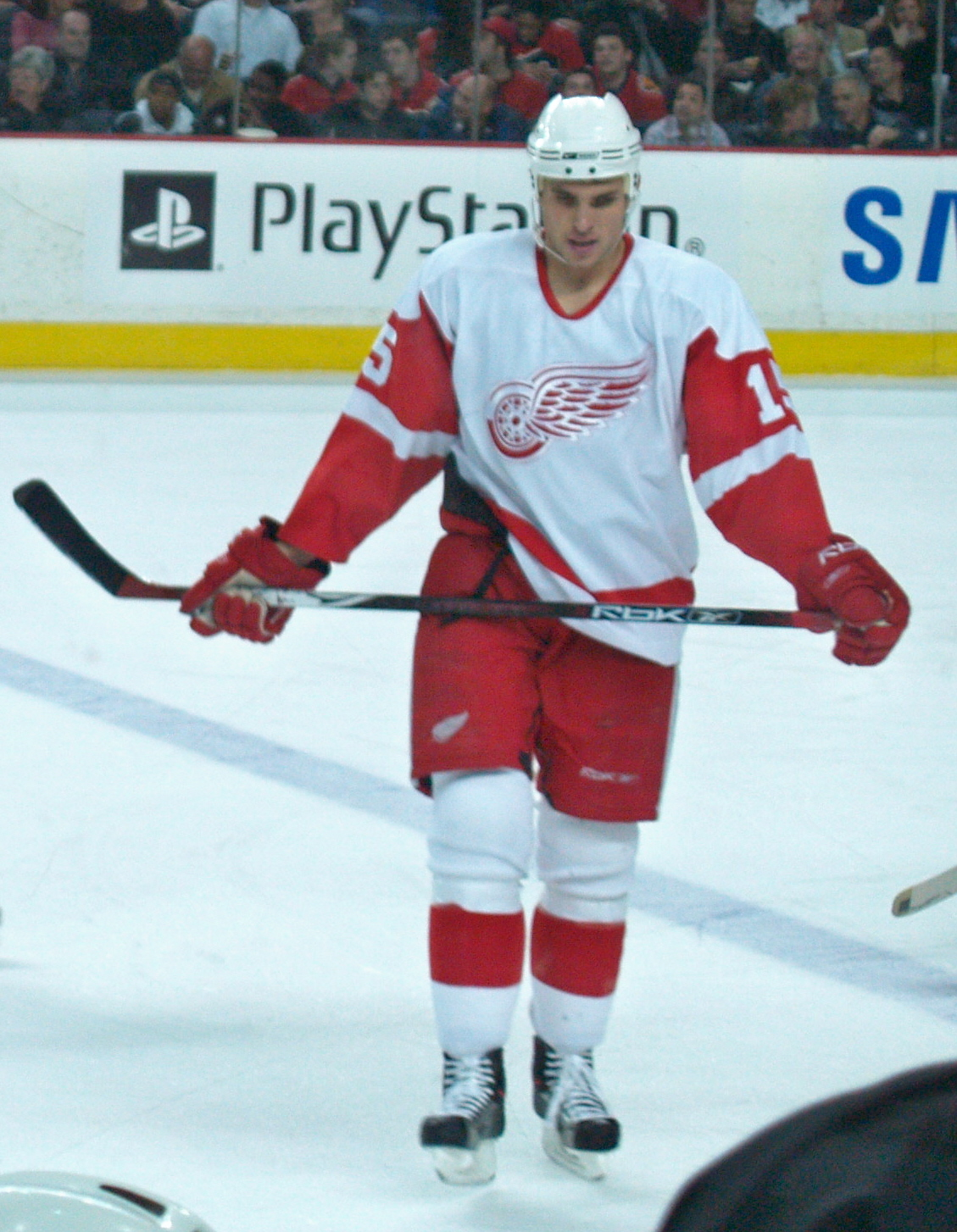
- Langfeld with the Detroit Red Wings in 2006
- Born: July 17, 1977 (age 48) Coon Rapids, Minnesota, U.S.
- Height: 6 ft 3 in (191 cm)
- Weight: 214 lb (97 kg; 15 st 4 lb)
- Position: Left wing
- Shot: Right
- Played for: Ottawa Senators; San Jose Sharks; Boston Bruins; Detroit Red Wings; Nashville Predators; Frankfurt Lions; HC Plzeň 1929; EC Villacher SV
- NHL draft: 66th overall, 1997; Ottawa Senators
- Playing career: 2001–2011

Joshua Adam Langfeld (born July 17, 1977) is an American former professional ice hockey player.

== Playing career ==
Langfeld was drafted in the 3rd round, 66th overall, in the 1997 NHL entry draft by the Ottawa Senators. He played four years at the University of Michigan before turning pro. In 1998, Langfeld scored the game-winning goal against Boston College in overtime to win the 1998 NCAA Division I Men's Ice Hockey Tournament for the University of Michigan.

He was traded multiple times as he toured the league with the Senators, San Jose Sharks, and the Detroit Red Wings, as well as American Hockey League clubs the Grand Rapids Griffins, Milwaukee Admirals, and Binghamton Senators.

== Career statistics ==
			Regular season					Playoffs
Season	Team	League	GP	G	A	Pts	PIM	GP	G	A	Pts	PIM
1995–96	Great Falls Americans	AFHL	45	45	40	85	105	—	—	—	—	—
1996–97	Lincoln Stars	USHL	38	35	23	58	100	14	8	13	21	42
1997–98	U. of Michigan	CCHA	46	19	17	36	66	—	—	—	—	—
1998–99	U. of Michigan	CCHA	41	21	14	35	84	—	—	—	—	—
1999–00	U. of Michigan	CCHA	39	9	21	30	56	—	—	—	—	—
2000–01	U. of Michigan	CCHA	42	16	12	28	44	—	—	—	—	—
2001–02	Grand Rapids Griffins	AHL	68	21	16	37	29	5	2	0	2	0
2001–02	Ottawa Senators	NHL	1	0	0	0	2	—	—	—	—	—
2002–03	Binghamton Senators	AHL	59	14	21	35	38	13	5	3	8	8
2002–03	Ottawa Senators	NHL	12	0	1	1	4	—	—	—	—	—
2003–04	Binghamton Senators	AHL	30	13	14	27	25	2	0	0	0	0
2003–04	Ottawa Senators	NHL	38	7	10	17	16	—	—	—	—	—
2004–05	Binghamton Senators	AHL	74	32	25	57	75	6	2	2	4	2
2005–06	San Jose Sharks	NHL	39	2	9	11	16	—	—	—	—	—
2005–06	Boston Bruins	NHL	18	0	1	1	10	—	—	—	—	—
2006–07	Grand Rapids Griffins	AHL	38	13	19	32	44	—	—	—	—	—
2006–07	Detroit Red Wings	NHL	33	0	2	2	12	—	—	—	—	—
2007–08	Milwaukee Admirals	AHL	44	22	7	29	34	5	5	1	6	6
2007–08	Nashville Predators	NHL	2	0	0	0	0	1	0	0	0	0
2008–09	Frankfurt Lions	DEL	45	21	16	37	63	4	0	0	0	2
2009–10	Frankfurt Lions	DEL	45	9	12	21	42	4	0	0	0	2
2010–11	HC Plzeň 1929	CZE	9	0	1	1	10	—	—	—	—	—
2010–11	EC Villacher SV	EBEL	34	17	15	32	56	10	4	4	8	24
NHL totals			143	9	23	32	60	1	0	0	0	0

== Awards and honors ==
Award	Year
All-NCAA All-Tournament Team	1998
