= Greg Crozier =

Canadian ice hockey player (born 1976)

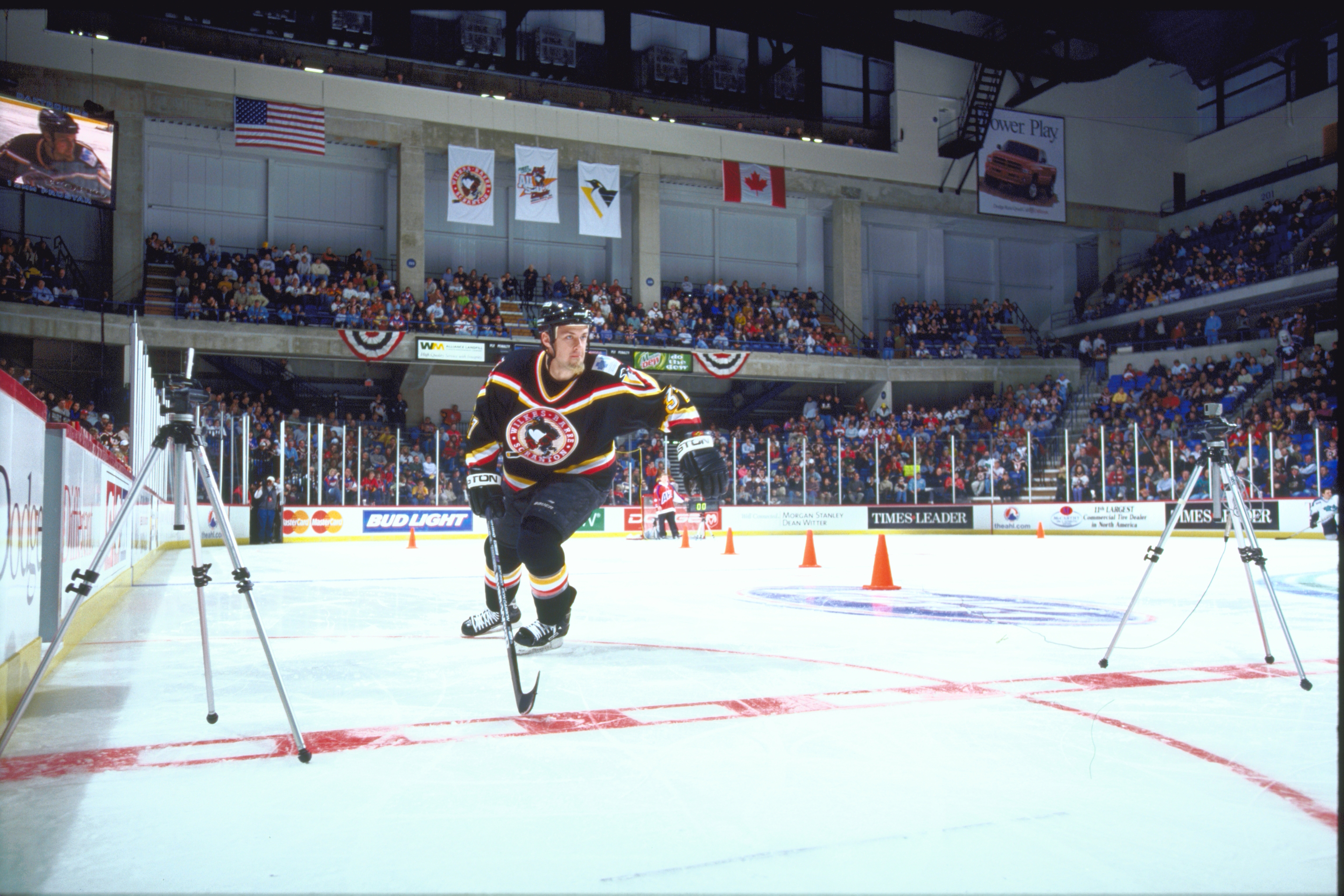
- Crozier with the Wilkes-Barre/Scranton Penguins in 2001
- Born: July 6, 1976 (age 48); Calgary, Alberta, Canada
- Height: 6 ft 3 in (191 cm)
- Weight: 200 lb (91 kg; 14 st 4 lb)
- Position: Left wing
- Shot: Left
- Played for: Pittsburgh Penguins
- NHL draft: 73rd overall, 1994; Pittsburgh Penguins
- Playing career: 1999–2004

Gregory T. Crozier (born July 6, 1976) is a Canadian retired professional ice hockey left wing. His father was Joe Crozier, who coached in the National Hockey League and American Hockey League.

== Playing career ==
He played college hockey for the Michigan Wolverines at the University of Michigan where he won National Championships in 1996 and 1998. After turning professional, he played one game for the Pittsburgh Penguins in the NHL against the Boston Bruins on December 6, 2000. He went scoreless in 4:10 of ice time. He also played in the AHL for the Wilkes-Barre/Scranton Penguins, Providence Bruins, Houston Aeros, Albany River Rats, and San Antonio Rampage.

On November 13, 1999, Crozier scored the first goal in Wilkes-Barre/Scranton Penguins inaugural season at the Northeastern Pennsylvania Civic Arena and Convention Center. The following season, Crozier helped guide the team to the Calder Cup finals, ultimately losing to the Saint John Flames.

== Career statistics ==
			Regular season					Playoffs
Season	Team	League	GP	G	A	Pts	PIM	GP	G	A	Pts	PIM
1992–93	Lawrence Academy	USHS	22	22	14	36	8	—	—	—	—	—
1993–94	Lawrence Academy	USHS	18	22	26	48	12	—	—	—	—	—
1994–95	Lawrence Academy	USHS	31	45	32	77	22	—	—	—	—	—
1995–96	University of Michigan	CCHA	42	14	10	24	46	—	—	—	—	—
1996–97	University of Michigan	CCHA	31	5	15	20	45	—	—	—	—	—
1997–98	University of Michigan	CCHA	45	12	10	22	26	—	—	—	—	—
1998–99	University of Michigan	CCHA	39	7	6	13	63	—	—	—	—	—
1999–00	Wilkes-Barre/Scranton Penguins	AHL	71	22	22	44	33	—	—	—	—	—
2000–01	Wilkes-Barre/Scranton Penguins	AHL	77	24	36	60	81	21	6	5	11	16
2000–01	Pittsburgh Penguins	NHL	1	0	0	0	0	—	—	—	—	—
2001–02	Providence Bruins	AHL	54	5	6	11	62	—	—	—	—	—
2001–02	Houston Aeros	AHL	10	1	5	6	10	14	2	1	3	26
2002–03	Houston Aeros	AHL	7	0	1	1	6	—	—	—	—	—
2002–03	Albany River Rats	AHL	56	19	19	38	46	—	—	—	—	—
2003–04	Albany River Rats	AHL	35	9	7	16	26	—	—	—	—	—
2003–04	San Antonio Rampage	AHL	22	2	5	7	8	—	—	—	—	—
NHL totals			1	0	0	0	0	—	—	—	—	—

== Awards and honours ==
Award	Year
AHL
All-Star Game	2001

== See also ==
- List of players who played only one game in the NHL
