= Buddy Powers =

American ice hockey player and coach

Current position
- Title: Volunteer Assistant
- Team: Bowling Green
- Conference: CCHA

Playing career
- 1972–1975: Boston University
- Position: Forward

Coaching career (HC unless noted)
- 1980–1982: Colgate (assistant)
- 1982–1988: Bowling Green (assistant)
- 1988–1989: RIT
- 1989–1994: RPI
- 1994–2002: Bowling Green
- 2002–2009: USNTDP (assistant)
- 2009–2014: Boston University (assistant)
- 2014–2022: Dallas Stars (scout)
- 2023–Present: Bowling Green (assistant)

Head coaching record
- Overall: 255–220–41

Accomplishments and honors

Championships
- ECAC West Tournament (1989)

Awards
- CCHA Coach of the Year (1995)

Francis "Buddy" Powers is an American former ice hockey player, coach and scout. He was the head coach for Bowling Green as well as Ice Arena Director for the Slater Family Ice Arena and color commentator for Bowling Green on The Buckeye Cable Sports Network.

== Playing career ==
Powers played left wing for three seasons at Boston University (BU) from 1972 to '75. He played 90 games during his time at BU, which placed third in the 1974 and ’75 NCAA Tournaments and compiled a 49-13-1 record over his final two years with the team. After graduating from BU in 1975, Powers went on to play professional hockey in Europe. He played two years (1976–78) as a defenseman for ESV Kaufbeuren and helped the team to a Division II Championship during his first season. He finished his playing career at Krefeld, Germany in 1979-80, assisting the team to the playoff finals.

== College coaching career ==
During his time coaching, Powers has had five players earn First-Team All-America honors, four have been finalists for the Hobey Baker Award, including 1995 Hobey Baker Award winner Brian Holzinger. Nineteen of his former players played professional hockey in North America, with four playing in the NHL.

=== Colgate ===
After finishing his professional hockey career in 1980, Powers joined the Colgate University coaching staff as an assistant coach under head coach Terry Slater. In his first season at Colgate, the team made the NCAA Tournament.

=== Bowling Green State University (assistant coach) ===
After the conclusion of the 1981-82 season, Powers became an assistant coach on the Bowling Green State University (BGSU) coaching staff under head coach Jerry York. In 1984, his first season as assistant coach, BGSU posted a 34-8-2 record and won Bowling Green's only NCAA National Championship for ice hockey. During his time as BGSU's assistant coach from 1982–1988, BGSU was the Central Collegiate Hockey Association (CCHA) regular season champions in 1982, 1983, 1984, 1987 and CCHA tournament champions in 1988. The team made the NCAA tournament in 1982, 1984, 1987, and 1988. Powers served as the team’s top assistant, chief recruiter, and on-ice instructor for BGSU. Under York and Powers, the Falcons were 174-74-8 (.695 pct.), including 129-50-8 (.710 pct.) in league play and finished either first or second in the CCHA on five occasions

=== Rochester Institute of Technology ===
Following the 1988 season, Powers accepted the head coaching position with the Division III Rochester Institute of Technology (RIT). In his first and only season with RIT, he led the Tigers to a 26-8-2 record. The team won the ECAC West Championship. The team made it to the NCAA Championship game but lost to University of Wisconsin–Stevens Point by a score of 3-2.

=== Rensselaer Polytechnic Institute ===
Powers went on to become the head coach of Division I Rensselaer Polytechnic Institute (RPI) for the 1989-90 season. The Engineers enjoyed improved seasons during Powers' tenure as head coach. The team qualified for the ECAC Tournament in 1990, 1992, 1993, and 1994. In 1994, the team returned to the ECAC Championship Game and the NCAA Tournament for the first time since 1985. In his five seasons at RPI, Powers led the Engineers to a record of 94-63-13 including three 20-or-more-wins seasons. in 1995, Powers returned to Bowling Green, this time as head coach.

=== Return to Bowling Green (head coach) ===
Powers was appointed the head coach at Bowling Green on July 12, 1994, becoming the fourth head coach in the program’s history. During the 1994-'95 campaign, Powers led the Falcons to a 25-11-2 record and a second-place finish in the CCHA. It marked their best finish in the league in eight years. He was named the CCHA’s Coach of the Year and was a finalist for the Spencer Penrose Award presented annually to the nation’s top head coach. Also that year, Brian Holzinger was named CCHA player of the Year. Holzinger won the NCAA All-American Award in ice hockey along with BGSU's Kelly Perrault. Holzinger became BGSU's second Hobey Baker Award winner, the other being George McPhee in 1982 during Powers' first season as BGSU's assistant coach.

Although the first half of his time as BGSU's head coach was strong, the lack of top players coming to BGSU affected his overall record; Powers finished sub-.500 in his last 5 seasons as BGSU's bench boss. Over eight seasons as BG's head coach, Powers has compiled a 135-149-26 record at Bowling Green. Powers is 12th all-time among CCHA coaches with 85 league victories with the Falcons and is 10 CCHA victories shy of entering the Top 10.

=== Return to Boston University (assistant coach) ===
In August, 2009, Powers joined BU as an assistant coach. He remained with the program until 2014 when he became an amateur scout for the Dallas Stars.

== International coaching career ==
Powers served as an assistant coach at the 1989 United States Olympic Festival and as head coach at the 1993 United States Olympic Festival games. He also coached the United States during the USA Cup Challenge in 1992. Powers joined the USA Hockey National Team Development Program in 2002 and served as an assistant coach in the 2002-2003 season.

== Other hockey related positions ==
Powers served on the Board of Governors of the American Hockey Coaches Association from 1993–1996 and was the director of BGSU’s Summer Hockey School held annually during the last two weeks of July. Powers was a representative of the Central Collegiate Hockey Association and BGSU on the NCAA Division I Ice Hockey Committee. He also served as Ice Arena Director at BGSU and was the color commentator for BGSU ice hockey games on BCSN.

== College player statistics ==
=== Player stats ===
Season	Team						
Season	Team	League	GP	G	A	Pts	PIM
1972-73	Boston University	ECAC	27	5	7	12	2
1973-74	Boston University	ECAC	31	5	6	11	10
1974-75	Boston University	ECAC	32	4	13	17	14
Total			90	14	26	40	26

== Head coaching record ==
Record table
Season	Team	Overall	Conference	Standing	Postseason
RIT Tigers (ECAC West) (1988–1989)
1988-89	RIT	26-8-2	19-2-1	1st	NCAA Runner-Up
RIT:		26-8-2			
Rensselaer Engineers (ECAC Hockey) (1989–1994)
1989-90	Rensselaer	20-14-0	14-8-0	2nd	ECAC Runner-Up
1990-91	Rensselaer	19-12-1	14-8-0	t-4th	ECAC Quarterfinals
1991-92	Rensselaer	14-15-4	6-12-4	10th	ECAC Semifinals
1992-93	Rensselaer	20-11-4	15-6-1	2nd	ECAC Third Place Game (Loss)
1993-94	Rensselaer	21-11-4	12-6-4	3rd	NCAA East Regional Quarterfinals
Rensselaer:		94-63-13	61-40-9		
Bowling Green Falcons (CCHA) (1994–2002)
1994-95	Bowling Green	25-11-2	18-7-2	2nd	CCHA Semifinals
1995-96	Bowling Green	26-14-1	18-11-1	5th	CCHA Semifinals
1996-97	Bowling Green	17-16-5	10-12-5	t-5th	CCHA Semifinals
1997-98	Bowling Green	8-27-3	6-21-3	11th	
1998-99	Bowling Green	17-18-3	13-14-3	7th	CCHA Quarterfinals
1999-00	Bowling Green	17-19-1	12-15-1	8th	CCHA Play-In
2000-01	Bowling Green	16-19-5	8-15-5	t-9th	CCHA Semifinals
2001-02	Bowling Green	9-25-6	7-18-3	11th	CCHA First Round
Bowling Green:		135-149-26	92-113-23		
Total:		255-220-41			
National champion Postseason invitational champion Conference regular season champion Conference regular season and conference tournament champion Division regular season champion Division regular season and conference tournament champion Conference tournament champion

Awards and achievements
Preceded by Red Berenson	CCHA Coach of the Year; 1994–95	Succeeded by Bill Wilkinson
