= Kelly Perrault =

Canadian ice hockey player

- Born: December 18, 1973 (age 52) Fort Saskatchewan, Alberta, Canada
- Height: 6 ft 1 in (185 cm)
- Weight: 205 lb (93 kg; 14 st 9 lb)
- Position: Defenseman
- Shot: Left
- Played for: Chicago Wolves; Houston Aeros; Birmingham Bulls; Long Beach Ice Dogs; Hershey Bears; Rochester Americans; Quad City Mallards; Straubing Tigers; Fort Wayne Komets; Dayton Bombers
- Playing career: 1993–2009

Kelly Perrault (born December 18, 1973) is a Canadian retired ice hockey defenseman who was an All-American for Bowling Green

== Career ==
Perrault's college career began in 1993 with Bowling Green. After a decent freshman campaign, the Falcons got a new head coach in Buddy Powers. The change in leadership coincided with Perrault's offensive numbers taking off and he nearly tripled his totals as a sophomore. The astounding jump led to Perrault being named an All-American. Despite helping the team finish with a 25–11–2 record, BG got snubbed by the NCAA selection committee and was left out of the NCAA Tournament. Perrault continued his pace as a junior and senior but couldn't stop his team from declining in his final year. After the college season was over, Perrault signed a professional contract with the Chicago Wolves and ended the season in the IHL playoffs.

In his first full year, Perrault took a step back offensively. He found himself playing AA hockey the following year and seemed to rebound. Unfortunately, with each opportunity at the AAA-level, Perrault could never find his scoring game and remained consigned to the lower-tier. He headed to Europe for a year but returned to North America for the remainder of his career afterwards. After helping the Fort Wayne Komets capture the Colonial Cup in 2003, Perrault retired following the next season. He returned after a four year break for a 30-game stint in 2009 but then hung up his skates for good.

== Statistics ==
=== Regular season and playoffs ===
			Regular Season					Playoffs
Season	Team	League	GP	G	A	Pts	PIM	GP	G	A	Pts	PIM
1991–92	Fort Saskatchewan Traders	AJHL	—	—	—	—	—	—	—	—	—	—
1992–93	Fort Saskatchewan Traders	AJHL	—	—	—	—	—	—	—	—	—	—
1993–94	Bowling Green	CCHA	38	5	12	17	36	—	—	—	—	—
1994–95	Bowling Green	CCHA	37	16	32	48	61	—	—	—	—	—
1995–96	Bowling Green	CCHA	40	14	32	46	101	—	—	—	—	—
1996–97	Bowling Green	CCHA	32	10	27	37	90	—	—	—	—	—
1996–97	Chicago Wolves	IHL	8	0	3	3	6	4	0	1	1	6
1997–98	Austin Ice Bats	WPHL	3	0	1	1	0	—	—	—	—	—
1997–98	Houston Aeros	IHL	53	3	4	7	58	1	0	0	0	0
1998–99	Birmingham Bulls	ECHL	50	7	32	39	59	—	—	—	—	—
1998–99	Manitoba Moose	IHL	17	0	0	0	23	—	—	—	—	—
1999–00	Birmingham Bulls	ECHL	51	12	36	48	71	—	—	—	—	—
1999–00	Long Beach Ice Dogs	IHL	8	0	1	1	14	—	—	—	—	—
1999–00	Rochester Americans	AHL	5	0	0	0	2	—	—	—	—	—
1999–00	Hershey Bears	AHL	5	0	3	3	4	5	0	1	1	4
2000–01	Hershey Bears	AHL	7	1	2	3	12	—	—	—	—	—
2000–01	Quad City Mallards	UHL	61	14	46	60	106	12	2	8	10	14
2001–02	Straubing Tigers	Germany 2	38	2	23	25	87	—	—	—	—	—
2002–03	Fort Wayne Komets	UHL	73	12	52	64	138	12	3	7	10	22
2003–04	Fort Wayne Komets	UHL	75	25	64	89	111	9	1	4	5	8
2008–09	Dayton Bombers	ECHL	30	1	13	14	42	—	—	—	—	—
NCAA totals			147	45	103	148	288	—	—	—	—	—
UHL totals			209	51	162	213	355	33	6	19	25	44
ECHL totals			131	20	81	101	172	—	—	—	—	—
IHL totals			86	3	8	11	101	5	0	1	1	6
AHL totals			17	1	5	6	18	5	0	1	1	4

== Awards and honors ==
Award	Year
All-CCHA First Team	1994–95
AHCA West First-Team All-American	1994–95
All-CCHA Second Team	1995–96

Awards and achievements
Preceded by John Gruden	CCHA Best Offensive Defenseman; 1994–95	Succeeded by Keith Aldridge
