= Steven Halko =

Canadian ice hockey player

- Born: March 8, 1974 (age 52) Caledon, Ontario, Canada
- Height: 6 ft 1 in (185 cm)
- Weight: 195 lb (88 kg; 13 st 13 lb)
- Position: Defence
- Shot: Right
- Played for: Carolina Hurricanes
- NHL draft: 225th overall, 1992; Hartford Whalers
- Playing career: 1996–2003

Steven Halko (born March 8, 1974) is a Canadian former professional ice hockey defenceman.

== Playing career ==
Halko was born in Caledon, Ontario. He played college hockey and was the captain at the University of Michigan for the Michigan Wolverines. After turning professional, he played in the AHL for the Springfield Falcons, Beast of New Haven, Worcester IceCats, and Lowell Lock Monsters. He spent his entire NHL career with the Carolina Hurricanes and holds the NHL record for most games played without a goal, at 155.

As of 2016, Halko is a financial advisor in North Carolina.

== Career statistics ==
| | | | Regular season | | | | | Playoffs |
| Season | Team | League | GP | G | A | Pts | PIM | GP | G | A | Pts | PIM |
|---|---|---|---|---|---|---|---|---|---|---|---|---|
| 1989–90 | Newmarket Hurricane 87's | CBJHL | 30 | 3 | 5 | 8 | 16 | — | — | — | — | — |
| 1990–91 | Newmarket Hurricane 87's | CBJHL | 35 | 2 | 13 | 15 | 37 | — | — | — | — | — |
| 1990–91 | Markham Thunderbirds | MetJAHL | 8 | 4 | 3 | 7 | 2 | — | — | — | — | — |
| 1991–92 | Thornhill Thunderbirds | MetJAHL | 44 | 15 | 46 | 61 | 43 | — | — | — | — | — |
| 1992–93 | University of Michigan | NCAA | 39 | 1 | 13 | 14 | 12 | — | — | — | — | — |
| 1993–94 | University of Michigan | NCAA | 41 | 2 | 13 | 15 | 32 | — | — | — | — | — |
| 1994–95 | University of Michigan | NCAA | 39 | 2 | 14 | 16 | 20 | — | — | — | — | — |
| 1995–96 | University of Michigan | NCAA | 43 | 4 | 16 | 20 | 32 | — | — | — | — | — |
| 1996–97 | Springfield Falcons | AHL | 70 | 1 | 5 | 6 | 37 | 11 | 0 | 2 | 2 | 8 |
| 1997–98 | Carolina Hurricanes | NHL | 18 | 0 | 2 | 2 | 10 | — | — | — | — | — |
| 1997–98 | Beast of New Haven | AHL | 65 | 1 | 19 | 20 | 44 | 1 | 0 | 0 | 0 | 0 |
| 1998–99 | Carolina Hurricanes | NHL | 20 | 0 | 3 | 3 | 24 | 4 | 0 | 0 | 0 | 2 |
| 1998–99 | Beast of New Haven | AHL | 42 | 2 | 7 | 9 | 58 | — | — | — | — | — |
| 1999–00 | Carolina Hurricanes | NHL | 58 | 0 | 8 | 8 | 25 | — | — | — | — | — |
| 2000–01 | Carolina Hurricanes | NHL | 48 | 0 | 1 | 1 | 6 | — | — | — | — | — |
| 2001–02 | Carolina Hurricanes | NHL | 5 | 0 | 1 | 1 | 6 | — | — | — | — | — |
| 2001–02 | Worcester IceCats | AHL | 43 | 3 | 5 | 8 | 15 | 3 | 0 | 1 | 1 | 0 |
| 2002–03 | Carolina Hurricanes | NHL | 6 | 0 | 0 | 0 | 0 | — | — | — | — | — |
| 2002–03 | Lowell Lock Monsters | AHL | 71 | 4 | 22 | 26 | 34 | — | — | — | — | — |
| NHL totals | | | 155 | 0 | 15 | 15 | 71 | 4 | 0 | 0 | 0 | 2 |
| AHL totals | | | 291 | 11 | 58 | 69 | 188 | 15 | 0 | 3 | 3 | 8 |

== Awards and honours ==
| Award | Year |
|---|---|
| CCHA All-Tournament Team | 1994 |
| All-CCHA Second Team | 1994-95 |
| All-CCHA Second Team | 1995-96 |
| All-NCAA All-Tournament Team | 1996 |

Awards and achievements
| Preceded by Brent Brekke | CCHA Best Defensive Defenseman; 1994-95 | Succeeded by Mike Matteucci |
