= 1994–95 NCAA Division I men's ice hockey season =

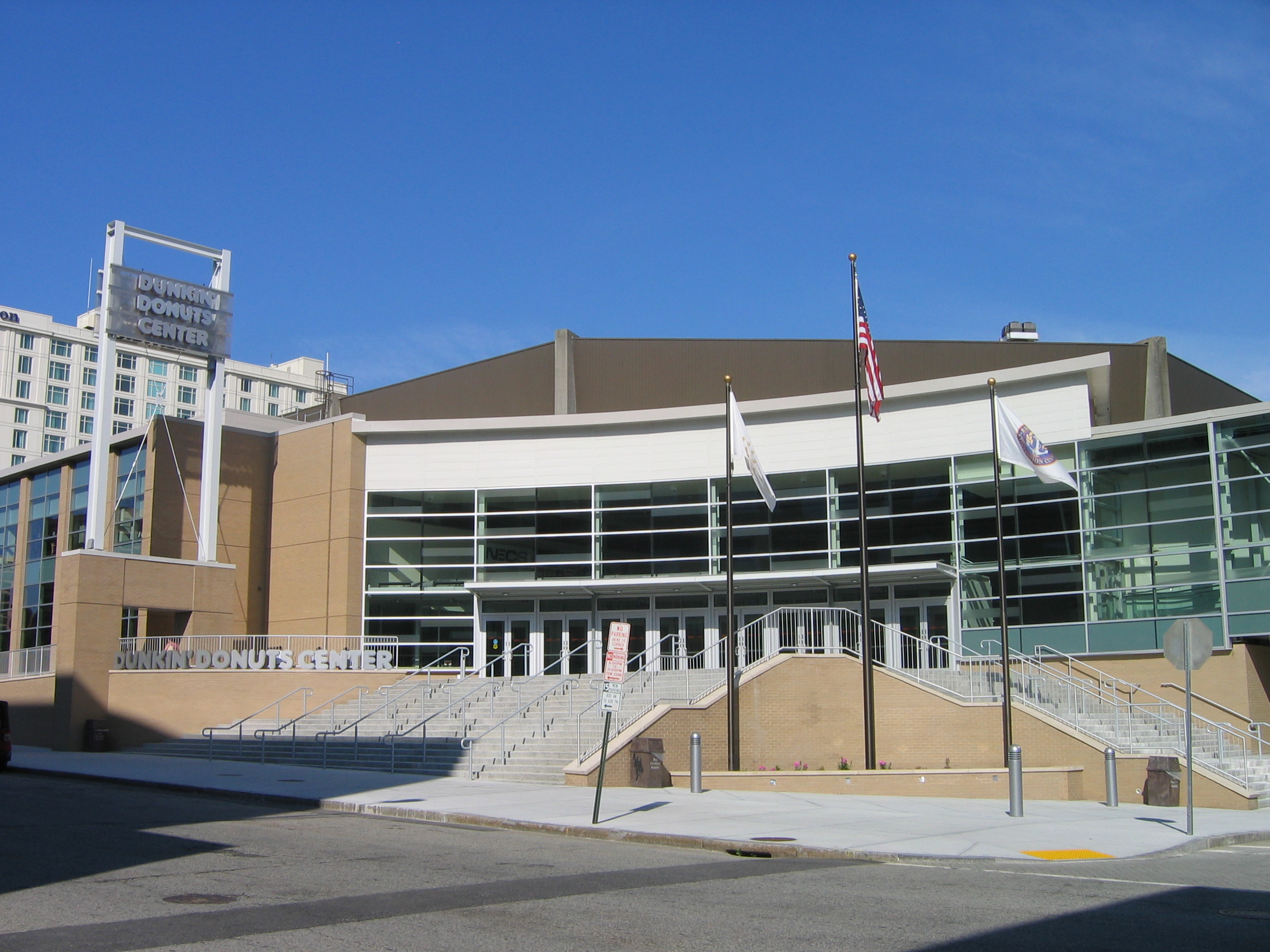
- The Providence Civic Center served as the host for the 1995 Frozen Four
- Duration: October 1994– April 1, 1995
- NCAA tournament: 1995
- National championship: Providence Civic Center; Providence, Rhode Island
- NCAA champion: Boston University
- Hobey Baker Award: Brian Holzinger (Bowling Green)

The 1994–95 NCAA Division I men's ice hockey season began in October 1994 and concluded with the 1995 NCAA Division I men's ice hockey tournament's championship game on April 1, 1995, at the Providence Civic Center in Providence, Rhode Island. This was the 48th season in which an NCAA ice hockey championship was held and is the 101st year overall where an NCAA school fielded a team.

== Season Outlook ==
=== Pre-season polls ===
The top teams in the nation as ranked before the start of the season.

The WMPL poll was voted on by coaches. The WMEB was voted on by media. The Record poll was voted on by coaches, media, and NHL scouts.

WMPL Poll
Rank	Team
1	Boston University (4)
2	Minnesota (2)
3	Michigan State (1)
4	Colorado College (1)
5	Wisconsin
6	Michigan (2)
7 (tie)	Northeastern
7 (tie)	Clarkson
9	Northern Michigan
10	Lake Superior State

WMEB Poll
Rank	Team
1	Boston University (10)
2	Michigan State (2)
3	Lake Superior State
4	Michigan
5	Colorado College
6	Minnesota
7	Harvard
8	Clarkson
9	New Hampshire
10	Maine

The Record Poll
Rank	Team
1	Boston University (20)
2	Michigan State (2)
3	Minnesota (3)
4	Colorado College
5	Michigan
6	Harvard
7	Northeastern
8	Lake Superior State
9 (tie)	Clarkson
9 (tie)	Vermont

== Regular season ==
=== Season tournaments ===
Tournament	Dates	Teams	Champion
Great Alaska Face–Off	November 24–26	4	Massachusetts–Lowell
College Hockey Showcase	November 25–26	4	
Cross Border Challenge	November 25–26	4	
Great Western Freeze–Out	November 25–27	4	Maine
Dexter Shoe Classic	December 22–23	4	Princeton
Chill Out at Saskatoon	December 27–29	4	St. Lawrence
Badger Showdown	December 28–29	4	Wisconsin
Denver Cup	December 28–29	4	Denver
Great Lakes Invitational	December 29–30	4	Michigan
Rensselaer Holiday Tournament	December 29–30	4	Maine
Syracuse Invitational	December 29–30	4	New Hampshire
Auld Lang Syne Classic	December 30–31	4	Vermont
Mariucci Classic	December 30–31	4	Boston University
Beanpot	February 6, 13	4	Boston University

=== Standings ===
1994–95 Central Collegiate Hockey Association standings
	Conference							Overall					
	GP	W	L	T	PTS	GF	GA	GP	W	L	T	GF	GA
Michigan†	27	22	4	1	45	151	74	39	30	8	1	218	109
Bowling Green	27	18	7	2	38	135	101	38	25	11	2	199	137
Michigan State	27	17	7	3	37	123	79	40	25	12	3	183	124
Lake Superior State*	27	14	9	4	32	114	78	41	23	12	6	176	125
Miami	27	13	8	6	32	88	87	39	18	15	6	129	132
Ferris State	27	9	14	4	22	82	111	36	12	20	4	113	157
Western Michigan	27	9	14	4	22	87	102	40	17	18	5	141	144
Illinois-Chicago	27	8	16	3	19	99	132	37	11	22	4	146	177
Notre Dame	27	7	19	1	15	77	126	37	11	25	1	121	168
Ohio State	27	3	22	2	8	76	142	38	7	29	2	112	195
Alaska-Fairbanks^								33	11	21	1	107	141
Championship: Lake Superior State † indicates conference regular season champion * indicates conference tournament champion^ Alaska-Fairbanks is an affiliate member and its games do not count towards the conference standings

1994–95 ECAC Hockey standings
	Conference							Overall					
	GP	W	L	T	PTS	GF	GA	GP	W	L	T	GF	GA
Clarkson†	22	14	5	3	31	116	70	37	23	10	4	195	125
Brown	22	13	7	2	28	78	76	30	15	12	3	108	109
Harvard	22	12	9	1	25	79	68	30	14	14	2	107	99
Colgate	22	12	9	1	25	98	78	37	20	16	1	158	144
Vermont	22	11	9	2	24	85	61	35	19	14	2	134	106
Rensselaer*	22	10	9	3	23	75	78	37	19	14	4	127	123
Princeton	22	9	10	3	21	81	83	35	18	13	4	123	117
St. Lawrence	22	10	12	0	20	83	110	33	15	17	1	116	150
Cornell	22	8	10	4	20	72	76	30	11	15	4	105	115
Union	22	6	12	4	16	70	87	29	9	16	4	100	116
Dartmouth	22	7	13	2	16	80	111	27	9	16	2	95	136
Yale	22	6	13	3	15	65	84	28	8	17	3	91	115
Championship: Rensselaer † indicates conference regular season champion * indicates conference tournament champion (Whitelaw Cup)

1994–95 Hockey East standings
	Conference								Overall					
	GP	W	L	T	SW	PTS	GF	GA	GP	W	L	T	GF	GA
Maine†	24	15	3	6	1	88	104	63	44	32	6	6	196	118
Boston University†*	24	16	5	3	2	88	131	82	40	31	6	3	224	117
New Hampshire	24	14	6	4	0	78	113	85	36	22	10	4	161	123
Northeastern	24	11	8	5	5	70	98	89	35	16	14	5	143	137
Massachusetts–Lowell	24	11	12	1	1	58	105	116	41	17	19	4	165	175
Providence	24	7	11	6	3	50	102	103	37	14	17	6	158	159
Merrimack	24	7	12	5	3	48	74	91	37	14	18	5	125	137
Boston College	24	8	14	2	1	45	86	119	35	11	22	2	129	169
Massachusetts	24	3	21	0	0	15	64	129	36	6	28	2	92	173
Championship: Boston University † indicates conference regular season champion * indicates conference tournament champion

1994–95 NCAA Division I Independent ice hockey standings
	Conference							Overall					
	GP	W	L	T	PTS	GF	GA	GP	W	L	T	GF	GA
Air Force	0	0	0	0	-	-	-	33	15	17	1	137	159
Army	0	0	0	0	-	-	-	34	20	13	1	173	106

1994–95 Western Collegiate Hockey Association standings
	Conference							Overall					
	GP	W	L	T	PTS	GF	GA	GP	W	L	T	GF	GA
Colorado College†	32	22	9	1	45	155	108	43	30	12	1	213	143
Wisconsin*	32	17	11	4	38	128	112	43	24	15	4	172	152
Denver	32	18	12	2	38	131	115	42	25	15	2	181	147
Minnesota	32	16	11	5	37	121	95	44	25	14	5	169	133
St. Cloud State	32	15	16	1	31	126	113	38	17	20	1	146	139
North Dakota	32	14	15	3	31	120	141	39	18	18	3	151	169
Minnesota-Duluth	32	13	15	4	30	124	127	38	16	18	4	146	146
Michigan Tech	32	12	17	3	27	109	140	39	15	20	4	136	175
Northern Michigan	32	10	19	3	23	110	136	40	13	24	3	142	171
Alaska-Anchorage	32	10	22	0	20	106	142	36	11	25	0	122	169
Championship: Wisconsin † indicates conference regular season champion * indicates conference tournament champion

=== Final regular season polls ===
The WMPL poll was released before the conference tournaments. The WMEB and The Record polls were released before the conference tournament finals.

WMPL Coaches Poll
Ranking	Team
1	Michigan (6)
2	Maine (3)
3	Boston University (1)
4	Colorado College
5	Bowling Green
6	Denver
7	New Hampshire
8	Michigan State
9	Wisconsin
10	Clarkson

WMEB Media Poll
Ranking	Team
1	Michigan (8)
2	Maine (1)
3	Boston University (1)
4	Colorado College
5	Bowling Green
6	Denver
7	Michigan State
8	New Hampshire
9	Clarkson
10	Minnesota

The Record Poll
Ranking	Team
1	Maine (18)
2	Michigan (7)
3	Boston University (4)
4	Colorado College (1)
5	Bowling Green
6	Denver
7	Clarkson
8	Michigan State
9	New Hampshire
10	Minnesota

== 1995 NCAA tournament ==
Regional Quarterfinals; March 24
E1	Boston University	–
–	bye	–
East Regional
E4	Clarkson	4
E5	Lake Superior State	5
W2	Colorado College	–
–	bye	–
West Regional
W3	Minnesota	1
W6	Rensselaer	0
W1	Michigan	–
–	bye	–
West Regional
W4	Wisconsin	5
W5	Michigan State	3
E2	Maine	–
–	bye	–
East Regional
E3	New Hampshire	2
E6	Denver	9

Regional semifinals March 25
E1	Boston University	6
E5	Lake Superior State	2
W2	Colorado College	2
W3	Minnesota	5
W1	Michigan	4
W4	Wisconsin	3
E2	Maine	4
E6	Denver	2

Frozen Four; March 30
E1	Boston University	7
W3	Minnesota	3
W1	Michigan	3
E2	Maine	4***

National championship April 1
E1	Boston University	6
E2	Maine	2

Note: * denotes overtime period(s)

== Player stats ==
=== Scoring leaders ===
The following players led the league in points at the conclusion of the season.

GP = Games played; G = Goals; A = Assists; Pts = Points; PIM = Penalty minutes

Player	Class	Team	GP	G	A	Pts	PIM
Brendan Morrison	Sophomore	Michigan	39	23	53	76	42
Martin St. Louis	Sophomore	Vermont	35	23	48	71	36
Éric Perrin	Sophomore	Vermont	35	28	39	67	38
Brian Holzinger	Senior	Bowling Green	38	32	34	66	42
Greg Bullock	Sophomore	Massachusetts-Lowell	40	25	40	65	125
Brian Bonin	Junior	Minnesota	44	32	31	63	28
Mike Knuble	Senior	Michigan	34	38	22	60	62
Marko Tuomainen	Senior	Clarkson	37	23	37	60	34
Mike Harder	Sophomore	Colgate	36	22	36	58	46
Patrice Robitaille	Senior	Clarkson	37	30	27	57	24
Peter Geronazzo	Junior	Colorado College	43	29	28	57	111
Colin Schmidt	Junior	Colorado College	43	26	31	57	61

=== Leading goaltenders ===
The following goaltenders led the league in goals against average at the end of the regular season while playing at least 33% of their team's total minutes.

GP = Games played; Min = Minutes played; W = Wins; L = Losses; OT = Overtime/shootout losses; GA = Goals against; SO = Shutouts; SV% = Save percentage; GAA = Goals against average

Player	Class	Team	GP	Min	W	L	OT	GA	SO	SV%	GAA
Blair Allison	Sophomore	Maine	44	2572	32	6	6	115	2	.887	2.68
Tim Thomas	Sophomore	Vermont	34	2010	18	13	2	90	4	.914	2.69
Tom Noble	Freshman	Boston University	18	1007	15	3	0	46			2.74
Marty Turco	Freshman	Michigan	37	2064	27	7	1	95	0	.894	2.76
Jeff Callinan	Senior	Minnesota	43	2482	23	11	5	115	2	.892	2.78
John Grahame	Freshman	Lake Superior State	28	1616	16	7	3	75	0	.887	2.79
Sinuhe Wallinheimo	Sophomore	Denver	34	1668	16	10	1	79	1	.904	2.84
Chuck Thuss	Senior	Miami	34	1983	16	10	6	95	0	.901	2.87
Mike Tamburro	Junior	Rensselaer	27	1519	13	8	4	74	0	.914	2.92
Will Clarke	Senior	Bowling Green	26	1454	14	6	2	75	0	.888	3.10

== Awards ==
=== NCAA ===
Award		Recipient
Hobey Baker Memorial Award		Brian Holzinger, Bowling Green
Spencer Penrose Award		Shawn Walsh, Maine
Most Outstanding Player in NCAA Tournament		Chris O'Sullivan, Boston University
AHCA All-American Teams
East First Team	Position	West First Team
Blair Allison, Maine	G	Chuck Thuss, Miami
Brian Mueller, Clarkson	D	Kelly Perrault, Bowling Green
Chris Imes, Maine	D	Brian Rafalski, Wisconsin
Mike Grier, Boston University	F	Brian Holzinger, Bowling Green
Greg Bullock, Massachusetts-Lowell	F	Brendan Morrison, Michigan
Martin St. Louis, Vermont	F	Brian Bonin, Minnesota
East Second Team	Position	West Second Team
Tim Thomas, Vermont	G	Ryan Bach, Colorado College
Kaj Linna, Boston University	D	Kent Fearns, Colorado College
Jeff Tory, Maine	D	Keith Aldridge, Lake Superior State
Chris O'Sullivan, Boston University	F	Jay McNeill, Colorado College
Marko Tuomainen, Clarkson	F	Mike Knuble, Michigan
Chad Quenneville, Providence	F	Anson Carter, Michigan State

=== CCHA ===
Awards		Recipient
Player of the Year		Brian Holzinger, Bowling Green
Best Defensive Forward		Wayne Strachan, Lake Superior State
Best Defensive Defenseman		Steve Halko, Michigan
Best Offensive Defenseman		Kelly Perrault, Bowling Green
Rookie of the Year		Marty Turco, Michigan
Coach of the Year		Buddy Powers, Bowling Green
Terry Flanagan Memorial Award		Chuck Thuss, Miami
Most Valuable Player in Tournament		Wayne Strachan, Lake Superior State
All-CCHA Teams
First Team	Position	Second Team
Chuck Thuss, Miami	G	Mike Buzak, Michigan State
Kelly Perrault, Bowling Green	D	Andy Roach, Ferris State
Keith Aldridge, Lake Superior State	D	Steven Halko, Michigan
Brian Holzinger, Bowling Green	F	Mike Knuble, Michigan
Anson Carter, Michigan State	F	Kevyn Adams, Miami
Brendan Morrison, Michigan	F	Rem Murray, Michigan State
Rookie Team	Position	
Marty Turco, Michigan	G	
Dan Boyle, Miami	D	
Steve Duke, Western Michigan	D	
Bill Muckalt, Michigan	F	
Robb Gordon, Michigan	F	
Jason Blake, Ferris State	F	

=== ECAC ===
Award		Recipient
Player of the Year		Martin St. Louis, Vermont
Rookie of the Year		Paul DiFrancesco, St. Lawrence
Coach of the Year		Bob Gaudet, Brown
Best Defensive Defenseman		Mike Traggio, Brown
Best Defensive Forward		Ian Sharp, Princeton
Most Outstanding Player in Tournament		Mike Tamburro, Rensselaer
All-ECAC Hockey Teams
First Team	Position	Second Team
Tim Thomas, Vermont	G	Todd Sullivan, Yale
Brian Mueller, Clarkson	D	Adam Bartell, Rensselaer
Mike Traggio, Brown	D	Brad Dexter, Colgate
Éric Perrin, Vermont	F	Mike Harder, Colgate
Martin St. Louis, Vermont	F	Burke Murphy, St. Lawrence
Marko Tuomainen, Clarkson	F	Patrice Robitaille, Clarkson
Rookie Team	Position	
Dan Brenzavich, Colgate	G	
Trevor Koenig, Union	G	
Dan Murphy, Clarkson	G	
Jimmy Andersson, Brown	D	
Chris Clark, Clarkson	F	
Paul DiFrancesco, St. Lawrence	F	
Eric Healey, Rensselaer	F	
Tim Loftsgard, Colgate	F	
Casson Masters, Princeton	F	
Ryan Smart, Cornell	F	
David Whitworth, Dartmouth	F	

=== Hockey East ===
Award		Recipient
Player of the Year		Chris Imes, Maine
Rookie of the Year		Mark Mowers, New Hampshire
Bob Kullen Coach of the Year Award		Shawn Walsh, Maine
Len Ceglarski Sportsmanship Award		Steve Thornton, Boston University
William Flynn Tournament Most Valuable Player		Bob Bell, Providence
All-Hockey East Teams
All Stars*	Position	All Stars*
Blair Allison, Maine	G	Martin Legault, Merrimack
Chris Imes, Maine	D	Kaj Linna, Boston University
Dan McGillis, Northeastern	D	Jeff Tory, Maine
Greg Bullock, Massachusetts-Lowell	F	Mike Grier, Boston University
Eric Flinton, New Hampshire	F	Chris O'Sullivan, Boston University
Jordan Shields, Northeastern	F	Chad Quenneville, Providence
Rookie Team	Position	
Brian Regan, Massachusetts	G	
Jeff Tory, Maine	D	
Chris Kelleher, Boston University	D	
Mark Mowers, New Hampshire	F	
Shawn Wansborough, Maine	F	
Casey Kesselring, Merrimack	F	

* No Distinction was made between First- and Second-Team All-Stars

=== WCHA ===
Award		Recipient
Player of the Year		Brian Bonin, Minnesota
Defensive Player of the Year		Brian Rafalski, Wisconsin
Rookie of the Year		Mike Crowley, Minnesota
Student-Athlete of the Year		Justin McHugh, Minnesota
Coach of the Year		George Gwozdecky, Denver
Most Valuable Player in Tournament		Kirk Daubenspeck, Wisconsin
All-WCHA Teams
First Team	Position	Second Team
Ryan Bach, Colorado College	G	Sinuhe Wallinheimo, Denver
Nick Naumenko, North Dakota	D	Kent Fearns, Colorado College
Brian Rafalski, Wisconsin	D	Kelly Hultgren, St. Cloud State
Greg Hadden, Northern Michigan	F	Brad Federenko, Minnesota-Duluth
Jay McNeill, Colorado College	F	Peter Geronazzo, Colorado College
Brian Bonin, Minnesota	F	Colin Schmidt, Colorado College
Rookie Team	Position	
Brian Leitza, St. Cloud State	G	
Mike Crowley, Minnesota	D	
Calvin Elfring, Colorado College	D	
Joe Bianchi, Wisconsin	F	
Mike Peluso, Minnesota-Duluth	F	
Ryan Kraft, Minnesota	F	

== 1995 NHL entry draft ==
Round	Pick	Player	College	Conference	NHL team
6	146	Marc Magliarditi ^{†}	Western Michigan	CCHA	Chicago Blackhawks
7	159	Mike LaPlante ^{†}	Wisconsin	WCHA	Mighty Ducks of Anaheim
7	170	Stewart Bodtker	Colorado College	WCHA	Vancouver Canucks
8	183	Kaj Linna	Boston University	Hockey East	Ottawa Senators
8	194	Ryan Kraft	Minnesota	WCHA	San Jose Sharks
8	197	Mark Murphy ^{†}	Rensselaer	ECAC Hockey	Toronto Maple Leafs
8	201	Casey Hankinson	Minnesota	WCHA	Chicago Blackhawks
8	205	Derek Bekar ^{†}	New Hampshire	Hockey East	St. Louis Blues
9	222	Jason Cugnet ^{†}	Colorado College	WCHA	Vancouver Canucks
9	225	Scott Swanson ^{†}	Colorado College	WCHA	Washington Capitals
9	231	Erik Kaminski ^{†}	Northeastern	Hockey East	Ottawa Senators
9	233	Steve Shirreffs ^{†}	Princeton	ECAC Hockey	Calgary Flames

† incoming freshman

== See also ==
- 1994–95 NCAA Division II men's ice hockey season
- 1994–95 NCAA Division III men's ice hockey season
