= Keith Aldridge =

American ice hockey player (born 1973)

- Born: July 20, 1973 (age 53) Detroit, Michigan, U.S.
- Height: 5 ft 11 in (180 cm)
- Weight: 185 lb (84 kg; 13 st 3 lb)
- Position: Defense
- Shot: Right
- Played for: Dallas Stars; Frankfurt Lions; Eisbären Berlin
- National team: United States
- NHL draft: Undrafted
- Playing career: 1996–2005

Keith Albert Aldridge (born July 20, 1973) is an American former professional ice hockey defenseman. He played four games in the National Hockey League with the Dallas Stars in the 1999–2000 season.

== Playing career ==
=== Amateur ===
As a youth, Aldridge played in the 1985, 1986 and 1987 Quebec International Pee-Wee Hockey Tournaments with the Detroit Compuware and Detroit Red Wings minor ice hockey teams.

Aldridge played junior hockey with the Rochester Mustangs of the United States Hockey League in 1991–92, where he was named to the USHL First All-Star Team.

Aldridge played college hockey for Lake Superior State University of the Central Collegiate Hockey Association, and was voted the CCHA Best Offensive Defenseman in 1995–96. He was a member of the Lakers' NCAA National Championship team in 1993–94, and was also named to the All-Star Tournament First Team. Aldridge was also named Second Team CCHA in 1994, First Team CCHA in 1995 and 1996, NCAA West Second All-American Team in 1995, and NCAA West First All-American Team in 1996.

Aldridge was a finalist for the 1996 Hobey Baker Award that went to Brian Bonin of Minnesota.

=== Professional ===
Aldridge was not selected in the NHL entry draft out of college, but signed as an undrafted free agent with the Baltimore Bandits of the American Hockey League in 1996.

In 1997, Aldridge signed with his hometown Detroit Vipers of the International Hockey League, where he was named an IHL All-Star in 1998–99. His impressive play led to a professional contract with the Dallas Stars of the National Hockey League in 1999. Although most of his season was spent in the IHL with the affiliate Kalamazoo Wings, he did play 4 games with the Stars. He spent the 2000–01 season with the Grand Rapids Griffins of the IHL. From 2001 to 2004, Aldridge played overseas for the Frankfurt Lions and Eisbären Berlin.

Aldridge signed with the New York Islanders in 2004, a move that reunited him with his college head coach Jeff Jackson, who had recently joined the Islanders staff as an assistant coach. Aldridge could not crack the NHL lineup, and he concluded his playing career in the AHL with the Bridgeport Sound Tigers in 2005.

== Post-playing career ==
Aldridge currently serves as vice president and general manager of Indianwood Golf and Country Club in Lake Orion, Michigan. His father, Stan Aldridge, had purchased the club in 1981. Aldridge worked at the facility through his youth before joining the organization full-time.

== Career statistics ==
=== Regular season and playoffs ===
			Regular season					Playoffs
Season	Team	League	GP	G	A	Pts	PIM	GP	G	A	Pts	PIM
1991–92	Rochester Mustangs	USHL	48	11	23	34	123	—	—	—	—	—
1992–93	Lake Superior State	CCHA	37	3	11	14	30	—	—	—	—	—
1993–94	Lake Superior State	CCHA	45	10	24	34	86	—	—	—	—	—
1994–95	Lake Superior State	CCHA	40	10	31	41	89	—	—	—	—	—
1995–96	Lake Superior State	CCHA	38	14	36	50	88	—	—	—	—	—
1995–96	Baltimore Bandits	AHL	7	0	2	2	4	—	—	—	—	—
1996–97	Baltimore Bandits	AHL	51	4	9	13	92	3	0	0	0	4
1997–98	Detroit Vipers	IHL	79	13	21	34	89	23	1	9	10	67
1998–99	Detroit Vipers	IHL	66	15	28	43	130	11	2	7	9	49
1999–00	Michigan K-Wings	IHL	55	2	10	12	55	—	—	—	—	—
1999–00	Dallas Stars	NHL	4	0	0	0	0	—	—	—	—	—
2000–01	Frankfurt Lions	DEL	39	9	12	21	141	—	—	—	—	—
2000–01	Grand Rapids Griffins	IHL	36	3	8	11	99	10	0	2	2	8
2001–02	Eisbären Berlin	DEL	48	7	15	22	159	4	0	2	2	4
2002–03	Eisbären Berlin	DEL	50	12	23	35	99	9	0	2	2	22
2003–04	Eisbären Berlin	DEL	48	8	13	21	84	11	1	7	8	20
2004–05	Bridgeport Sound Tigers	AHL	32	1	9	10	35	—	—	—	—	—
NHL totals			4	0	0	0	0	—	—	—	—	—

=== International ===
Year	Team	Event	Result	GP	G	A	Pts	PIM
1995	United States	WC	6th	4	0	0	0	2
1996	United States	WC	3rd place, bronze medalist(s)	8	0	1	1	2
Senior totals				12	0	1	1	4

== Awards and honours ==
Award	Year
All-CCHA Second Team	1993–94
All-NCAA All-Tournament Team	1994
All-CCHA First Team	1994–95
AHCA West Second-Team All-American	1994–95
CCHA All-Tournament Team	1995
All-CCHA First Team	1995–96
AHCA West First-Team All-American	1995–96
CCHA All-Tournament Team	1996

Awards and achievements
Preceded by Kelly Perrault	CCHA Best Offensive Defenseman; 1995–96	Succeeded by Andy Roach
