= Coach Gruden =

Coach Gruden may refer to:

- Jay Gruden (born 1967), American football coach, notably of the Washington Redskins
- Jon Gruden (born 1963), American football coach, notably of the Oakland/Las Vegas Raiders and Tampa Bay Buccaneers
- John Gruden (born 1970), American ice hockey coach of the Toronto Marlies
