= Chuck Thuss =

Canadian ice hockey player

- Born: February 15, 1972 (age 54) Arkona, Ontario, Canada
- Height: 6 ft 1 in (185 cm)
- Weight: 210 lb (95 kg; 15 st 0 lb)
- Position: Goaltender
- Caught: Left
- Played for: Miami; Los Angeles Ice Dogs; Louisiana IceGators; Birmingham Bulls; Mobile Mysticks; Houston Aeros; Mississippi Sea Wolves
- Playing career: 1991–2002

Charles Thuss is a Canadian public speaker and former ice hockey owner, coach and goaltender who was an All-American for Miami.

== Career ==
Thuss began attending Miami University in 1991 and was slotted in as the team's 4th goaltender. He remained in that position for three seasons, not playing a single minute in the Redskins' goal until his senior season. It wasn't until the graduation of Richard Shulmistra and the departure of head coach George Gwozdecky that Thuss got his turn in net. In 1994, under new bench boss Mark Mazzoleni, Thuss got his chance to play and made the most of his opportunity. He became the team's starter, playing 34 of 39 games and keeping the team on the winning side more often than not. While his numbers weren't eye-popping, Thuss' performance for an undermanned Miami squad were appreciated by not only the team but most observers as well. He was named as the top goaltender for the CCHA and was a First-Team All-American, the first player in program history to receive that honor. He also received the Terry Flanagan Memorial Award for his perseverance in staying with the sport despite the lack of playing time.

Thuss was able to convert his brief college hockey experience into a professional career. He spent most of his time in the ECHL and served as a capable goaltender for several years. While playing with the Mobile Mysticks, Thuss founded his own sports equipment company, Southern Sports Supply, and operated the business for 14 years. After finishing his playing career with the Mississippi Sea Wolves, Thuss remained with the club as a coach until 2004. Since he remained in the area with his company, Thuss was able to found his own team in the wake of Hurricane Katrina with the Southern Professional Hockey League, a single-A league. The Mississippi Surge were announced in 2008 and began play the following year with Thuss remaining part owner until the end of their first season.

In 2010, Thuss returned to coaching with the US inline hockey team. He worked with the team for four years as he transitioned from sporting goods into being an investment advisor. In 2017 Thuss began his most recent venture, public speaking. Leaning on his early struggles as a goaltender, Thuss wanted to help others in the same situation get through difficult times in their lives. He continues to advocate for mental health as of 2021.

== Statistics ==
=== Regular season and playoffs ===
			Regular season									Playoffs
Season	Team	League	GP	W	L	T	MIN	GA	SO	GAA	SV%	GP	W	L	MIN	GA	SO	GAA	SV%
1990–91	Detroit Compuware Ambassadors	OHL	1	0	1	0	40	5	0	7.50	.773	—	—	—	—	—	—	—	—
1994–95	Miami	CCHA	34	16	10	6	1983	95	0	2.87	.901	—	—	—	—	—	—	—	—
1995–96	Los Angeles Ice Dogs	IHL	22	5	10	1	976	64	0	3.93	.862	—	—	—	—	—	—	—	—
1995–96	Louisiana IceGators	ECHL	15	6	4	1	685	42	0	3.67	.888	3	—	—	—	—	—	—	—
1996–97	Birmingham Bulls	ECHL	27	10	8	5	1435	103	1	4.31	.886	—	—	—	—	—	—	—	—
1996–97	Mobile Mysticks	ECHL	9	4	3	1	441	23	0	3.12	.906	2	—	—	—	—	—	—	—
1997–98	Houston Aeros	IHL	1	1	0	0	60	4	0	4.00	.875	—	—	—	—	—	—	—	—
1997–98	Mobile Mysticks	ECHL	38	14	14	6	1983	101	2	3.06	.905	2	—	—	—	—	—	—	—
1998–99	Mississippi Sea Wolves	ECHL	37	19	10	2	1850	93	3	3.02	.902	—	—	—	—	—	—	—	—
1999–00	Mississippi Sea Wolves	ECHL	39	20	11	5	2199	106	2	2.89	.914	7	—	—	—	—	—	—	—
2000–01	Mississippi Sea Wolves	ECHL	34	15	16	2	1942	95	3	2.93	.912	—	—	—	—	—	—	—	—
2001–02	Mississippi Sea Wolves	ECHL	8	4	2	1	342	10	0	1.75	.936	—	—	—	—	—	—	—	—
IHL totals			23	6	10	1	1,036	68	0	3.94	.863	—	—	—	—	—	—	—	—
ECHL totals			207	92	68	23	10,877	573	11	3.16	.905	14	—	—	—	—	—	—	—

== Awards and honors ==
Award	Year
All-CCHA First Team	1994–95
AHCA West First-Team All-American	1994–95

== Personal life ==
According to a community website, Thuss serves as the president of a homeowners association in Alabama. The website lists a number of controversies that he has been involved in concerning the organization, including filing litigation against homeowners.

Despite Thuss owning a company which provides personal “life coaching” services, he has filed bankruptcy on at least one occasion. According to the bankruptcy filing he was sued by PNC bank and was indebted over $300,000 to the bank. It also states that he lost several thousand to an Internet scam, leading to questions about his competency.

Awards and achievements
Preceded by Craig Lisko	Terry Flanagan Memorial Award; 1994–95	Succeeded by Jon Gaskins
