= Mike Weaver (ice hockey) =

Canadian ice hockey player (born 1978)

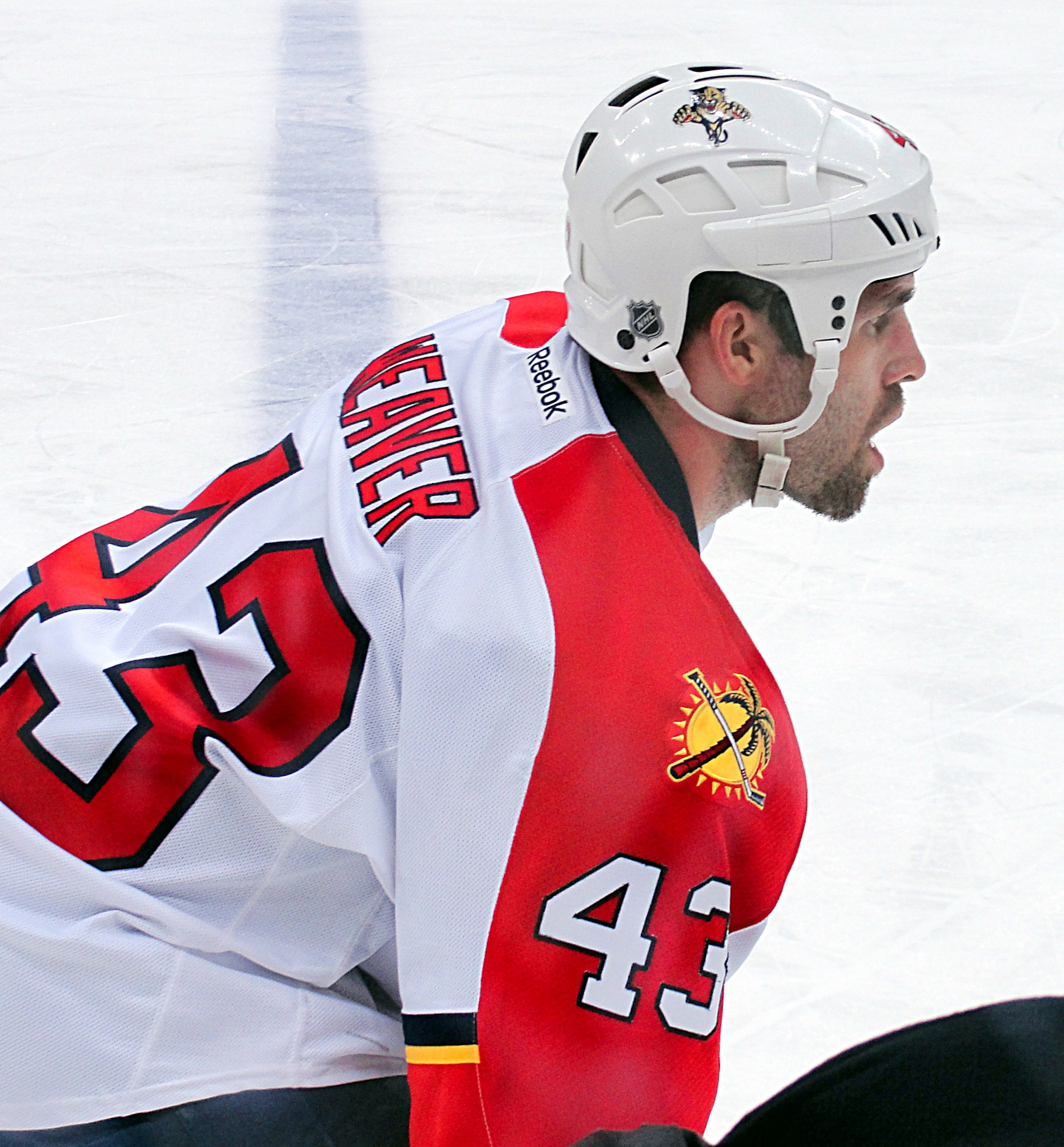
- Weaver with the Florida Panthers in March 2012
- Born: May 2, 1978 (age 48) Bramalea, Ontario, Canada
- Height: 5 ft 10 in (178 cm)
- Weight: 183 lb (83 kg; 13 st 1 lb)
- Position: Defence
- Shot: Right
- Played for: Atlanta Thrashers; Los Angeles Kings; Vancouver Canucks; St. Louis Blues; Florida Panthers; Montreal Canadiens
- NHL draft: Undrafted
- Playing career: 2000–2015

Arthur Michael Robert Weaver (born May 2, 1978) is a Canadian former professional ice hockey defenceman.

== Playing career ==
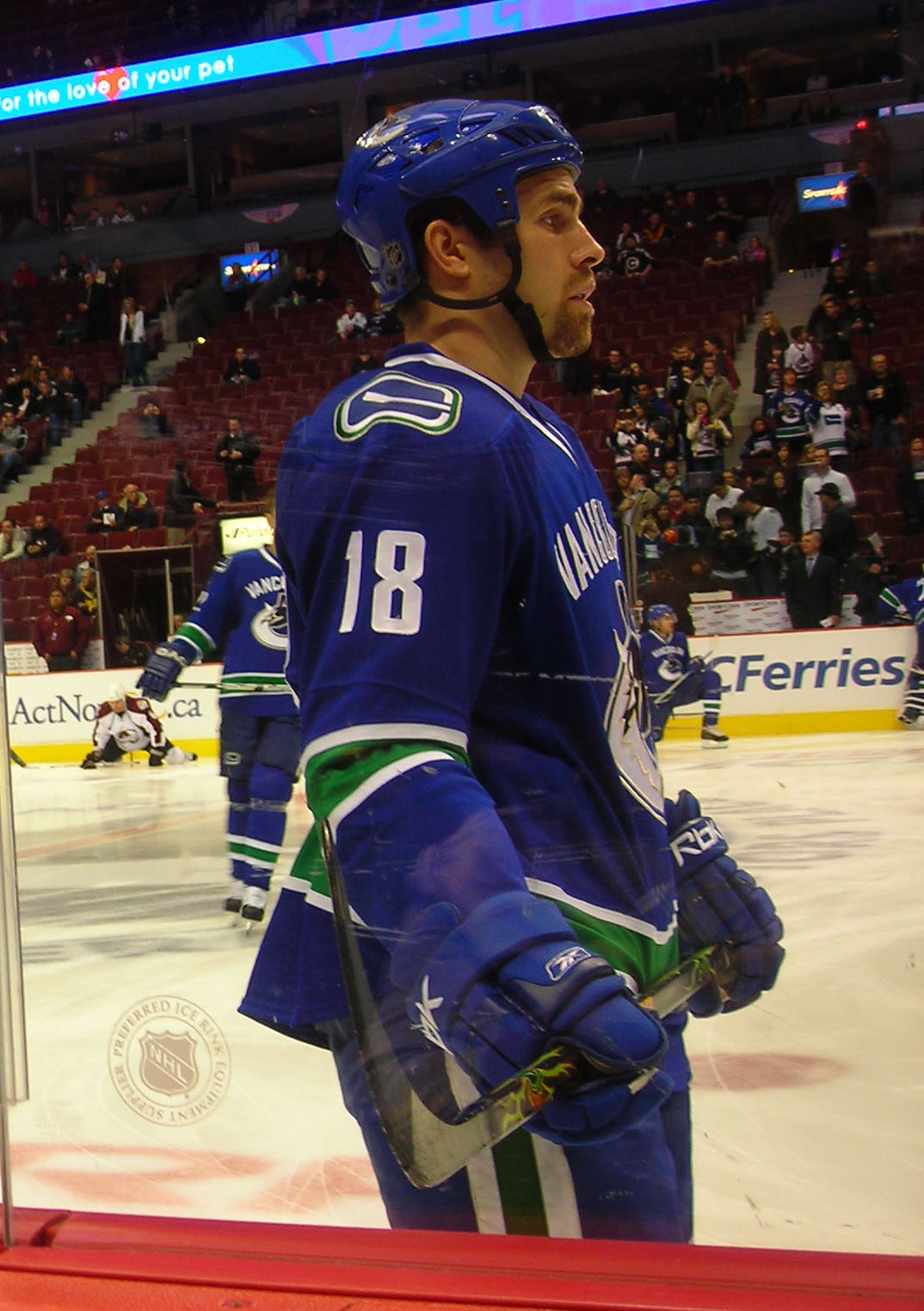
Weaver with the Vancouver Canucks in February 2008

As a youth, Weaver played in the 1992 Quebec International Pee-Wee Hockey Tournament with the Chinguacousy Blues minor ice hockey team from Bramalea, Ontario. He later joined the Richmond Hill-Vaughan Kings of OMHA. After being a 7th round draft choice of the OHL's Guelph Storm in 1995, Weaver decided to continue playing OHA Junior A hockey to maintain his NCAA scholarship eligibility.

Weaver played Tier II Jr.A. with both the Thornhill Islanders and the Bramalea Blues. In his final season with the Blues he led the club to a Dudley Hewitt Cup as OHA Junior A Champions and a berth in the 1999 Royal Bank Cup in Yorkton, Saskatchewan; Weaver's team was eliminated in the semi-finals.

The diminutive defenceman acquired a scholarship with the Michigan State Spartans and spent four years in the CCHA that included two First All-Star team nods and two Best Defensive Defenceman awards.

Undrafted by the NHL, Weaver was signed as a free agent by the Atlanta Thrashers on June 15, 2000. He spent the subsequent season with Atlanta's IHL affiliate, Orlando, with whom he won the Turner Cup as IHL champions. In 2001–02, Weaver played his first 16 games in the NHL, in addition to helping the Thrashers' AHL affiliate, the Chicago Wolves, to a Calder Cup championship. Most of his four seasons as a Thrasher would be spent in the AHL.

In the summer of 2004, Weaver would sign with the Los Angeles Kings as a free agent. After playing 2004–05 with the Kings' AHL affiliate, Manchester, Weaver would play 2005–06 and 2006–07 in the NHL.

On August 8, 2007, Weaver was signed again as a free agent by the Pittsburgh Penguins. However, just before the start of the 2007–08 season, he was placed on waivers and picked up by Vancouver, where he played in 55 games. In the proceeding off season, he was signed by the St. Louis Blues. On August 3, 2010, Weaver left the Blues as a free agent and signed a two-year $1.8 million contract with the Florida Panthers.

In the 2013–14 season, his fourth with the Panthers, Weaver was traded to the Montreal Canadiens for a 5th round draft pick in the 2015 NHL entry draft on March 4, 2014.

On May 15, 2015, it was announced by Canadiens GM Marc Bergevin, that Weaver will not return to the Montreal Canadiens next season. Having gone un-signed over the summer, on October 5, 2015, Weaver announced his retirement from professional hockey.

== Career statistics ==
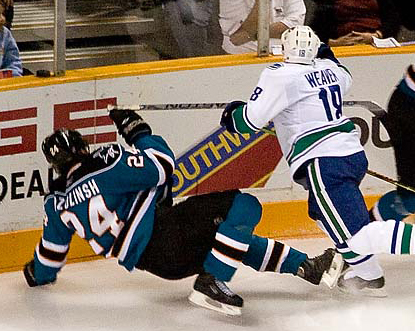
Weaver collides with Sandis Ozolinsh in December 2007

			Regular season					Playoffs
Season	Team	League	GP	G	A	Pts	PIM	GP	G	A	Pts	PIM
1996–97	Michigan State Spartans	CCHA	39	0	7	7	46	—	—	—	—	—
1997–98	Michigan State Spartans	CCHA	44	4	22	26	68	—	—	—	—	—
1998–99	Michigan State Spartans	CCHA	42	1	6	7	54	—	—	—	—	—
1999–00	Michigan State Spartans	CCHA	26	0	7	7	20	—	—	—	—	—
2000–01	Orlando Solar Bears	IHL	68	0	8	8	34	16	0	2	2	8
2001–02	Atlanta Thrashers	NHL	16	0	1	1	10	—	—	—	—	—
2001–02	Chicago Wolves	AHL	58	2	8	10	67	25	1	3	4	21
2002–03	Atlanta Thrashers	NHL	40	0	5	5	20	—	—	—	—	—
2002–03	Chicago Wolves	AHL	33	2	2	4	32	9	0	3	3	4
2003–04	Atlanta Thrashers	NHL	1	0	0	0	0	—	—	—	—	—
2003–04	Chicago Wolves	AHL	78	3	14	17	89	9	2	2	4	20
2004–05	Manchester Monarchs	AHL	79	1	22	23	61	6	0	1	1	0
2005–06	Los Angeles Kings	NHL	53	0	9	9	14	—	—	—	—	—
2006–07	Los Angeles Kings	NHL	39	3	6	9	16	—	—	—	—	—
2006–07	Manchester Monarchs	AHL	7	1	3	4	2	—	—	—	—	—
2007–08	Vancouver Canucks	NHL	55	0	1	1	33	—	—	—	—	—
2008–09	St. Louis Blues	NHL	58	0	7	7	12	4	0	0	0	0
2009–10	St. Louis Blues	NHL	77	1	9	10	29	—	—	—	—	—
2010–11	Florida Panthers	NHL	82	2	11	13	34	—	—	—	—	—
2011–12	Florida Panthers	NHL	82	0	16	16	14	7	1	0	1	0
2012–13	Florida Panthers	NHL	27	1	8	9	8	—	—	—	—	—
2013–14	Florida Panthers	NHL	55	0	6	6	23	—	—	—	—	—
2013–14	Montreal Canadiens	NHL	17	1	6	7	8	17	1	3	4	14
2014–15	Montreal Canadiens	NHL	31	0	4	4	6	—	—	—	—	—
NHL totals			633	8	89	97	227	28	2	3	5	14

== Awards and honours ==
Award	Year
OPJHL Defenceman of the Year	1995-96
CCHA All-Tournament Team	1997
All-CCHA First Team	1998-99
CCHA Best Defensive Defenseman	1998-99
AHCA West Second-Team All-American	1998–99
All-CCHA First Team	1999-00
CCHA Best Defensive Defenseman	1999-00
AHCA West Second-Team All-American	1999-00

Awards and achievements
Preceded by Tyler Harlton	CCHA Best Defensive Defenseman; 1998–99 / 1999–00	Succeeded by Andrew Hutchinson
