= CCHA Best Offensive Defenseman =

- Sport: Ice hockey
- Awarded for: Best Offensive Defenseman in the CCHA

History
- First award: 1990
- Final award: 2013
- Most recent: Jacob Trouba

The CCHA Best Offensive Defenseman was an annual award given out at the conclusion of the Central Collegiate Hockey Association (CCHA) regular season to the best offensive defenseman in the conference as voted by the coaches of each CCHA team.

The Best Offensive Defenseman was first awarded in 1990 and every year thereafter until 2013 when the original CCHA was dissolved as a consequence of the Big Ten Conference forming its men's ice hockey conference.

The CCHA was revived in 2020, with play resuming in the 2021–22 season, by seven schools that left the Western Collegiate Hockey Association, with an eighth school joining before play started. The revived league chose to fold its previous awards for Best Offensive and Best Defensive Defenseman into a single CCHA Defenseman of the Year award.

Four players received the award two separate times, each doing so in consecutive years. Additionally, Andy Greene is the only defenseman to win both the 'Best Offensive' and 'Best Defensive' Defenseman in the same year (2005–06).

== Award winners ==
Year	Winner	School
1989–90	Rob Blake	Bowling Green
1990–91	Jason Woolley	Michigan State
1991–92	Mark Astley	Lake Superior State
1992–93	Joe Cook	Miami
1993–94	John Gruden	Ferris State
1994–95	Kelly Perrault	Bowling Green
1995–96	Keith Aldridge	Lake Superior State
1996–97	Andy Roach	Ferris State
1997–98	Dan Boyle	Miami
1998–99	Mike Jones	Bowling Green
1999–00	Jeff Jillson	Michigan
2000–01	Greg Zanon	Nebraska-Omaha

Year	Winner	School
2001–02	John-Michael Liles	Michigan State
2002–03	John-Michael Liles	Michigan State
2003–04	A. J. Thelen	Michigan State
2004–05	Andy Greene	Miami
2005–06	Andy Greene	Miami
2006–07	Jack Johnson	Michigan
2007–08	Tyler Eckford	Alaska
2008–09	Erik Gustafsson	Northern Michigan
2009–10	Erik Gustafsson	Northern Michigan
2010–11	Torey Krug	Michigan State
2011–12	Torey Krug	Michigan State
2012–13	Jacob Trouba	Michigan

=== Winners by school ===
School	Winners
Michigan State	6
Miami	4
Bowling Green	3
Michigan	3
Ferris State	2
Lake Superior State	2
Northern Michigan	2
Alaska	1
Nebraska-Omaha	1

== See also ==
- CCHA Awards
- CCHA Best Defensive Defenseman
