= Mike Crowley =

American ice hockey player (born 1975)

- Born: July 4, 1975 (age 50) Bloomington, Minnesota, U.S.
- Height: 5 ft 11 in (180 cm)
- Weight: 190 lb (86 kg; 13 st 8 lb)
- Position: Defense
- Shot: Left
- Played for: Mighty Ducks of Anaheim
- National team: United States
- NHL draft: 140th overall, 1993; Philadelphia Flyers
- Playing career: 1997–2002

Michael Ryan Crowley (born July 4, 1975 in Bloomington, Minnesota), is a former American professional ice hockey player. He spent parts of three seasons in the National Hockey League (NHL) with the Mighty Ducks of Anaheim between 1997 and 2001. Along with his NHL career, Crowley also played several seasons in the American Hockey League (AHL) and International Hockey League (IHL). Before turning pro, he had a successful college hockey career, spending three seasons with the University of Minnesota. On the international level, Crowley represented the United States at major events, including the World Junior Championships and the World Championships.

== Playing career ==
Crowley began his hockey career with the University of Minnesota, where he spent three seasons developing his skills and establishing himself as a standout defenseman in collegiate hockey. His strong play caught the attention of NHL scouts, and he was selected 140th overall by the Philadelphia Flyers in the 1993 NHL entry draft. However, before completing his college career, his NHL rights were traded in 1996 to the Mighty Ducks of Anaheim. Crowley went on to play 67 games with the Ducks, where he contributed 5 goals and 10 assists, while also registering 44 penalty minutes. Alongside his NHL experience, Crowley spent significant time in the minor leagues, further refining his game with the Cincinnati Mighty Ducks of the American Hockey League (AHL) and in the International Hockey League (IHL), where he suited up for the Long Beach Ice Dogs and the Grand Rapids Griffins. In 2001, seeking to continue his playing career, Crowley joined the Minnesota Wild organization. However, he did not crack the NHL lineup and was instead assigned to their AHL affiliate, the Houston Aeros. After appearing in just 11 games for the Aeros, Crowley decided to retire from the sport.

== Career statistics ==
=== Regular season and playoffs ===
			Regular season					Playoffs
Season	Team	League	GP	G	A	Pts	PIM	GP	G	A	Pts	PIM
1990–91	Bloomington Jefferson High School	HS-MN	20	3	9	12	2	—	—	—	—	—
1991–92	Bloomington Jefferson High School	HS-MN	28	5	18	23	8	—	—	—	—	—
1992–93	Bloomington Jefferson High School	HS-MN	22	10	32	42	18	—	—	—	—	—
1993–94	Bloomington Jefferson High School	HS-MN	28	23	54	77	26	—	—	—	—	—
1994–95	University of Minnesota	WCHA	41	11	27	38	60	—	—	—	—	—
1995–96	University of Minnesota	WCHA	42	17	46	63	28	—	—	—	—	—
1996–97	University of Minnesota	WCHA	42	9	47	56	24	—	—	—	—	—
1997–98	Mighty Ducks of Anaheim	NHL	8	2	2	4	8	—	—	—	—	—
1997–98	Cincinnati Mighty Ducks	AHL	76	12	26	38	91	—	—	—	—	—
1998–99	Mighty Ducks of Anaheim	NHL	20	2	3	5	16	—	—	—	—	—
1998–99	Cincinnati Mighty Ducks	AHL	44	5	23	28	42	3	0	3	3	2
1999–00	Long Beach Ice Dogs	IHL	67	9	39	48	35	4	2	1	3	6
2000–01	Mighty Ducks of Anaheim	NHL	39	1	10	11	20	—	—	—	—	—
2000–01	Grand Rapids Griffins	IHL	22	4	12	16	10	—	—	—	—	—
2001–02	Houston Aeros	AHL	11	3	3	6	4	11	1	2	3	0
AHL totals			131	20	52	72	137	14	1	5	6	2
NHL totals			67	5	15	20	44	—	—	—	—	—

=== International ===
Year	Team	Event	GP	G	A	Pts	PIM
1995	United States	WJC	7	0	3	3	8
1996	United States	WC	8	0	1	1	6
1998	United States	WC	6	1	0	1	0
Junior totals			7	0	3	3	8
Senior totals			14	1	1	2	6

== Awards and honors ==
Award	Year
All-WCHA Rookie Team	1994–95
All-WCHA First Team	1995–96
AHCA West First-Team All-American	1995–96
WCHA All-Tournament Team	1996
All-WCHA First Team	1996–97
AHCA West First-Team All-American	1996–97

Awards and achievements
Preceded by Landon Wilson	WCHA Rookie of the Year; 1994–95	Succeeded by Brian Swanson
Preceded by Brian Bonin	WCHA Player of the Year; 1996–97	Succeeded by Curtis Murphy
