= CCHA Best Defensive Defenseman =

- Sport: Ice hockey
- Awarded for: Best Defensive Defenseman in the CCHA

History
- First award: 1990
- Most recent: Jack Anderson

The CCHA Best Defensive Defenseman is an annual award given out at the conclusion of the Central Collegiate Hockey Association (CCHA) regular season to the best defensive defenseman in the conference as voted by the coaches of each CCHA team.

The Best Defensive Defenseman was first awarded in 1990 and every year thereafter until 2013 when the original CCHA was dissolved as a consequence of the Big Ten forming its men's ice hockey conference.

The CCHA was revived in 2020, with play resuming in the 2021–22 season, by seven schools that left the Western Collegiate Hockey Association, with an eighth school joining before play started. The revived league chose to fold its previous awards for Best Defensive and Best Offensive Defenseman into a single CCHA Defenseman of the Year award. The award was revived in 2024.

Three players (Tyler Harlton, Mike Weaver and Danny DeKeyser) have received the award two separate times, each doing so in consecutive years. Additionally, Andy Greene is the only defenseman to win both the "Best Defensive" and "Best Offensive" Defenseman in the same year (2005–06).

== Award winners ==
Year	Winner	School
1989–90	Dan Keczmer	Lake Superior State
1990–91	Karl Johnston	Lake Superior State
1991–92	Joby Messier	Michigan State
1992–93	Bob Marshall	Miami
1993–94	Brent Brekke	Western Michigan
1994–95	Steve Halko	Michigan
1995–96	Mike Matteucci	Lake Superior State
1996–97	Tyler Harlton	Michigan State
1997–98	Tyler Harlton	Michigan State
1998–99	Mike Weaver	Michigan State
1999–00	Mike Weaver	Michigan State
2000–01	Andrew Hutchinson	Michigan State
2001–02	Mike Komisarek	Michigan

Year	Winner	School
2002–03	Brad Fast	Michigan State
2003–04	Doug Andress	Ohio State
2004–05	Nathan Oystrick	Northern Michigan
2005–06	Andy Greene	Miami
2006–07	Matt Hunwick	Michigan
2007–08	Alec Martinez	Miami
2008–09	Kyle Lawson	Notre Dame
2009–10	Will Weber	Miami
2010–11	Sean Lorenz	Notre Dame
2011–12	Danny DeKeyser	Western Michigan
2012–13	Danny DeKeyser	Western Michigan
2023–24	Kyle Looft	Bemidji State
2024–25	Chase Pietila	Michigan Tech
2025–26	Jack Anderson	Michigan Tech

=== Winners by school ===
School	Winners
Michigan State	7
Miami	4
Lake Superior State	3
Michigan	3
Western Michigan	3
Michigan Tech	2
Notre Dame	2
Bemidji State	1
Northern Michigan	1
Ohio State	1

== See also ==
- CCHA Awards
- CCHA Best Offensive Defenseman
