= John-Michael Liles =

American ice hockey player (born 1980)

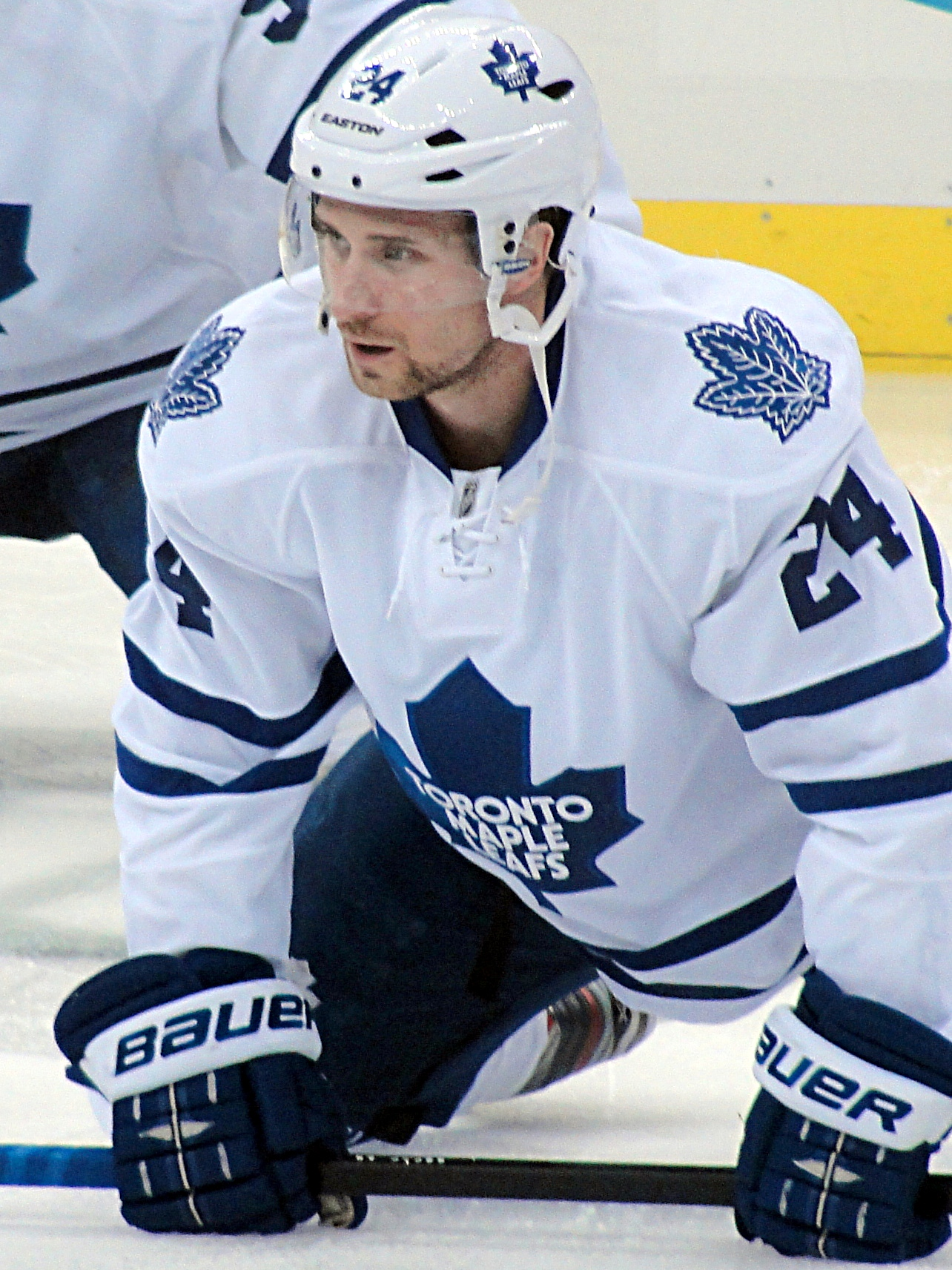
- Liles with the Toronto Maple Leafs in 2012
- Born: November 25, 1980 (age 45) Indianapolis, Indiana, U.S.
- Height: 5 ft 10 in (178 cm)
- Weight: 185 lb (84 kg; 13 st 3 lb)
- Position: Defense
- Shot: Left
- Played for: Colorado Avalanche; Toronto Maple Leafs; Carolina Hurricanes; Boston Bruins
- National team: United States
- NHL draft: 159th overall, 2000; Colorado Avalanche
- Playing career: 2003–2017

John-Michael Liles (born November 25, 1980) is an American former professional ice hockey defenseman. He played in the National Hockey League (NHL) for the Colorado Avalanche, Toronto Maple Leafs, Carolina Hurricanes and Boston Bruins. In addition to his playing career, Liles is a minority owner of the Indiana Ice of the United States Hockey League (USHL).

== Early life ==
Liles was born on November 25, 1980, in Indianapolis, Indiana, to parents John Jr. and Janie. While he was born in Indianapolis, Liles grew up in Zionsville. Neither of his parents played ice hockey but were active in other sports. His younger siblings Jessie and Joe played ice hockey as youths. Growing up, Liles attended Eagle Creek and Deer Run elementary schools. He became interested in hockey after watching the Indianapolis Checkers in the International Hockey League.

== Playing career ==
=== Amateur ===
Growing up in Indiana, Liles played for the Indy Wings minor ice hockey team and competed in the 1994 Quebec International Pee-Wee Hockey Tournament. He enrolled at Culver Academies in 1995 and remained there for two years. In his freshman year, Liles received the Col. George T. Gunston Medal as his class's best member of the artillery battalion. At the age of 16, Liles left Culver and joined the USA Hockey National Team Development Program in Ann Arbor, Michigan. While participating in the program, Liles signed an NCAA Division I letter of intent to play collegiate hockey at Michigan State University (MSU).

=== Collegiate ===
Liles played college ice hockey with the Michigan State Spartans men's ice hockey team from 1999 to 2003 while majoring in finance. As a freshman, Liles quickly became a mainstay in the Spartans' lineup and power play unit. He began the 1999–2000 season with four goals and three assists through his first 13 games. While he began the season paired with Jon Insana, head coach Ron Mason matched Liles with fellow freshman Brad Fast on November 27, 1999, and they remained together for the rest of the season. Although Liles was chosen to represent Team USA at the 2000 World Junior Ice Hockey Championships, he suffered a shoulder injury in an exhibition game. He missed over three weeks to recover from the injury but returned to the Spartans lineup in early January. At the time of the injury, Liles ranked second in scoring among all Central Collegiate Hockey Association (CCHA) rookies with 14 points. Liles finished his freshman season with eight goals and 20 assists through 40 games and was named to the CCHA All-Rookie Team.

Ahead of the 2000 NHL entry draft, Liles was ranked 103rd overall by the NHL Central Scouting Bureau and was projected to be drafted in the fourth or fifth round. He was eventually drafted in the fifth round, 159th overall, by the Colorado Avalanche. Liles returned to MSU for his sophomore season. He finished the 2000–01 season with 25 points through 42 games and was named to the All-CCHA Second Team.

In the 2001–02 season, Liles led the entire Spartans team in scoring with 35 points, earning him a selection to the All-CCHA First Team and Second All-American Team. On October 6, 2001, Liles also took part in the famous Cold War outdoor game, which at that time held the attendance record for an ice hockey game, against the University of Michigan.

During his senior season with the Spartans, Liles again led the team in scoring, registering 50 points in just 39 games while helping Michigan State to a 23–14–2 record. Earning the CCHA Best Offensive Defensemen Award for the second consecutive year, he scored an average of 1.28 points per game for Michigan State and was also a finalist for the Hobey Baker Award.

=== Professional ===
==== Colorado Avalanche ====
After completing his collegiate career, Liles signed a two-year, entry-level contract with the Avalanche on March 29, 2003. Signing an amateur try-out contract the following day with Colorado's American Hockey League (AHL) affiliate, the Hershey Bears, Liles made his professional debut against the Grand Rapids Griffins on March 30 and played in ten games to end the 2002–03 season.

In the 2003–04 season, Liles made the Avalanche roster out of college and scored his first NHL goal and point, a game-winner, against the Minnesota Wild on October 16, 2003. He led all rookie defensemen with ten goals and 34 points in 79 games to be named to the NHL All-Rookie Team while also becoming the highest point-scoring rookie defenseman in Avalanche history, and second in franchise history since Bruce Bell's 37 with the Quebec Nordiques in 1984–85.

During the NHL lockout the next season, Liles enjoyed a brief stint in the German Deutsche Eishockey Liga (DEL) for the Iserlohn Roosters, playing in 17 contests and scoring 11 points. He then returned to the Avalanche for the 2005–06 season and established himself within the Avalanche defensive corps, appearing in all 82 regular season games and finishing tied in first in goals scored by a defenseman with Rob Blake, with 14. Improving his offensive numbers in every category, Liles also set a new team record among defensemen with 14 points scored in the month of October. Following another impressive season, he then signed a two-year contract extension on July 12, 2006.

With the arrival of rookie Paul Stastny surprisingly making the team in 2006–07, Liles relinquished his number 26 jersey, worn by former Quebec Nordiques great Peter Šťastný, for Paul Stastny to wear in honor of his father. With the change to the number 4 jersey, Liles led the Avalanche defense in scoring with 14 goals and 44 points, placing tenth in the NHL. In reaching his tenth goal against the Dallas Stars on December 27, 2006, Liles became the first defensemen in the NHL since Steve Duchesne in 1987–88 to score at least ten goals in his first three NHL seasons.

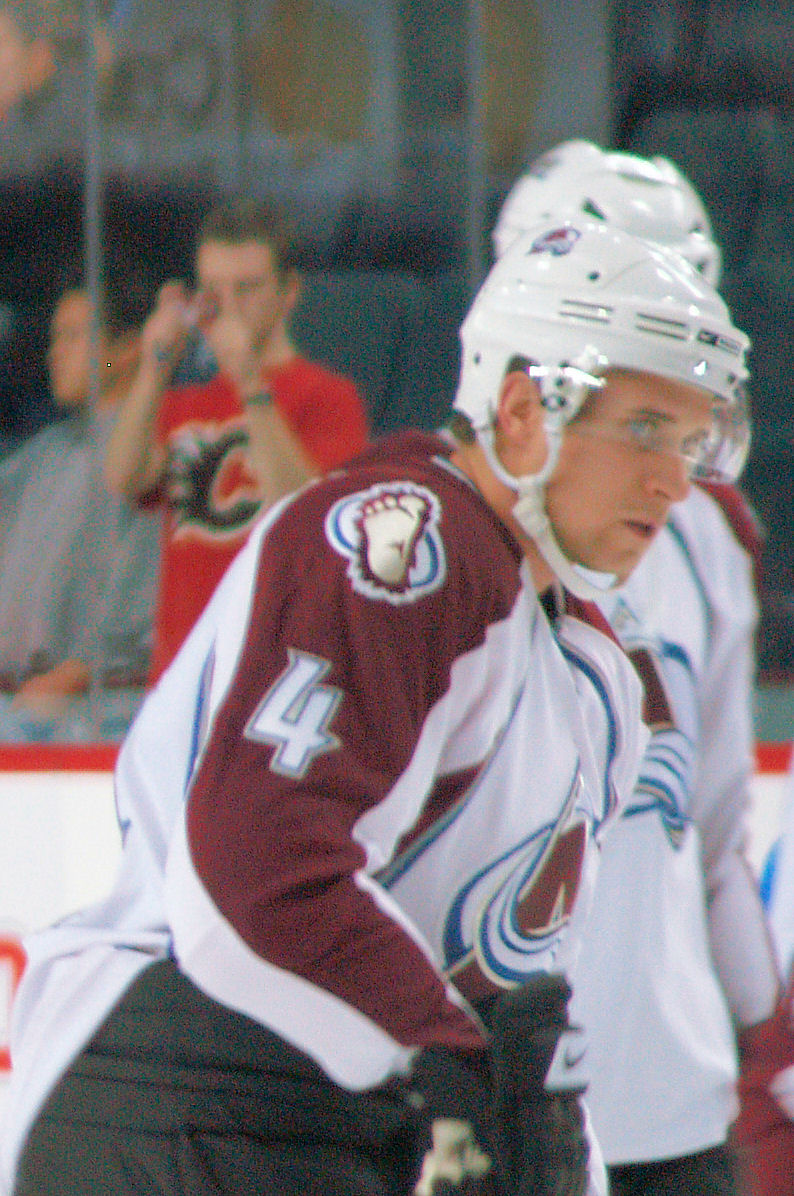
Liles with the Avalanche in 2007.

After suffering the disappointment of failing to qualify for the Stanley Cup playoffs for the first time in Avalanche History, Liles helped lead the team return to the post-season in 2007–08. On December 17, 2007, he recorded two helpers against the Los Angeles Kings to surpass 100 career assists in the NHL. Despite leading the defense in scoring for a second consecutive year, he recorded a career-low six goals for 32 points in 81 games. On the eve of the beginning of the free agency period, on July 1, Liles was re-signed to a new four-year contract with the Avalanche on June 30, 2008.

In the 2008–09 season, Liles rebounded offensively to again top all Avalanche defensemen in goals with 12, and ranked fourth on the team in points with 39 as the struggling Avalanche finished 27th in the NHL, its worst-ever finish under the Avalanche name. Transitioning into a senior role for the Colorado defense, Liles scored his 50th career goal against the Toronto Maple Leafs on January 29, 2009, to become only the fifth defender in Quebec/Colorado history to achieve the feat.

Hampered by a re-occurring shoulder injury midway through the 2009–10 season, Liles also struggled with returning to form and was a healthy scratch for a brief period for the first time in his NHL career. Despite playing in a career-low 59 regular season games for 31 points, he still led the resurgent youth-laden Avalanche team in defenseman scoring for a fourth consecutive season.

To begin the 2010–11 season, Liles made NHL and franchise history when he recorded an assist in a 4–3 overtime loss to the Vancouver Canucks on October 26, 2010, giving him assists in nine consecutive games to open the season. Despite the Avalanche failing to qualify for the 2011 Stanley Cup playoffs, Liles accumulated a career-high 40 assists in 76 games played.

==== Toronto Maple Leafs ====
On June 24, 2011, Liles was traded by the Avalanche to the Toronto Maple Leafs in exchange for a second-round pick in the 2012 NHL entry draft. He scored his first goal as a Maple Leaf in a game against the Columbus Blue Jackets. On January 25, 2012, Liles signed a four-year, $15.5 million contract extension with the Maple Leafs. On October 1, 2013, after being waived by the Maple Leafs, he was assigned to the team's AHL affiliate, the Toronto Marlies. He was later recalled to the NHL on October 28, sent back on November 15, and then recalled again on December 6.

==== Carolina Hurricanes ====
On January 1, 2014, Liles was traded to the Carolina Hurricanes, along with Toronto prospect Dennis Robertson, in exchange for defenseman Tim Gleason.

==== Boston Bruins ====
On February 29, 2016, Liles was traded to the Boston Bruins in exchange for Anthony Camara, a 2016 third-round pick and a 2017 fifth-round pick.

On July 1, 2016, he re-signed a one-year deal, worth $2 million with the Bruins. In his second season with the Bruins in 2016-17, restricted by injury and also reassigned to a depth role, Liles appeared in just 36 games with the Bruins totalling 5 assists.

==== Retirement ====
Due to a concussion in his final year with Boston, Liles opted to end his 14-year professional career, returning to Colorado with his family and accepting a part-time role as a studio analyst for Altitude Sports in covering the Colorado Avalanche. He appears on the network live during Avalanche game intermissions from his home in Vail, Colorado.

== International play ==
Initially, Liles was selected to play for Team USA in the 2000 World Junior Championships in Umeå, Sweden, but suffered an injured shoulder in the last minute of the last exhibition game to rule him out of the tournament. During the 2004–05 NHL lockout, Liles made his international debut when he was recalled prior to his European stint with the DEL's Islerhohn Roosters as an injury replacement for Hal Gill for the 2004 World Cup. After scoring in his first exhibition game against Russia, Liles played in two games during the World Cup.

Liles' place was retained within Team USA when he was named, alongside future teammate Jordan Leopold, as a part of the young core of the squad to appear at the 2005 World Championships. Liles, however, went pointless in seven games before the U.S. finished in sixth place after elimination in the quarter-finals to the tournament's eventual gold medalists, the Czech Republic.

During the 2005–06 season, Liles was named to Team USA for the 2006 Winter Olympics in Turin, Italy. He appeared in all six games for the underwhelming U.S. team, recording two assists before suffering elimination in a quarter-final loss to Finland, 4–3.

Three years later, Liles returned to Team USA when he was added to the team's roster for the 2009 World Championships following Colorado's cellar-dwelling season in 2008–09. He finished the tournament with the most points on the team, as well as second-most overall amongst tournament defenseman, scoring nine points from nine games. Team USA ended up fourth overall, losing the bronze medal game to Sweden.

== Personal life ==
Liles married fiancée Erin Johnson in 2013. Together they have two daughters.

== Records ==
- Longest consecutive point-scoring streak for an NHL defenseman from the start of season, 9.

== Career statistics ==
=== Regular season and playoffs ===
			Regular season					Playoffs
Season	Team	League	GP	G	A	Pts	PIM	GP	G	A	Pts	PIM
1995–96	Culver Academies	HS-Prep	—	—	—	—	—	—	—	—	—	—
1996–97	Culver Academies	HS-Prep	—	—	—	—	—	—	—	—	—	—
1997–98	U.S. NTDP Juniors	USHL	5	0	1	1	0	—	—	—	—	—
1997–98	U.S. NTDP U17	USDP	15	0	6	6	4	—	—	—	—	—
1997–98	U.S. NTDP U18	NAHL	42	4	7	11	40	5	2	0	2	0
1998–99	U.S. NTDP Juniors	USHL	46	4	14	18	47	—	—	—	—	—
1998–99	U.S. NTDP U18	NAHL	13	2	5	7	6	—	—	—	—	—
1999–00	Michigan State University	CCHA	40	8	20	28	26	—	—	—	—	—
2000–01	Michigan State University	CCHA	42	7	18	25	28	—	—	—	—	—
2001–02	Michigan State University	CCHA	41	13	22	35	18	—	—	—	—	—
2002–03	Michigan State University	CCHA	39	16	34	50	46	—	—	—	—	—
2002–03	Hershey Bears	AHL	5	0	1	1	4	5	0	0	0	2
2003–04	Colorado Avalanche	NHL	79	10	24	34	28	11	0	1	1	4
2004–05	Iserlohn Roosters	DEL	17	5	6	11	24	—	—	—	—	—
2005–06	Colorado Avalanche	NHL	82	14	35	49	44	9	1	2	3	6
2006–07	Colorado Avalanche	NHL	71	14	30	44	44	—	—	—	—	—
2007–08	Colorado Avalanche	NHL	81	6	26	32	26	10	2	3	5	2
2008–09	Colorado Avalanche	NHL	75	12	27	39	31	—	—	—	—	—
2009–10	Colorado Avalanche	NHL	59	6	25	31	30	6	1	1	2	4
2010–11	Colorado Avalanche	NHL	76	6	40	46	35	—	—	—	—	—
2011–12	Toronto Maple Leafs	NHL	66	7	20	27	20	—	—	—	—	—
2012–13	Toronto Maple Leafs	NHL	32	2	9	11	4	4	0	0	0	2
2013–14	Toronto Marlies	AHL	16	3	10	13	14	—	—	—	—	—
2013–14	Toronto Maple Leafs	NHL	6	0	0	0	0	—	—	—	—	—
2013–14	Carolina Hurricanes	NHL	35	2	7	9	8	—	—	—	—	—
2014–15	Carolina Hurricanes	NHL	57	2	20	22	14	—	—	—	—	—
2015–16	Carolina Hurricanes	NHL	64	6	9	15	16	—	—	—	—	—
2015–16	Boston Bruins	NHL	17	0	6	6	2	—	—	—	—	—
2016–17	Boston Bruins	NHL	36	0	5	5	4	6	0	2	2	0
NHL totals			836	87	283	370	286	46	4	9	13	18

=== International ===
Year	Team	Event	Result	GP	G	A	Pts	PIM
2004	United States	WCH	4th	2	0	0	0	0
2005	United States	WC	6th	7	0	0	0	0
2006	United States	OG	8th	6	0	2	2	2
2009	United States	WC	4th	9	1	8	9	2
Senior totals				24	1	10	11	4

== Awards and honors ==
Award	Year
College
All-CCHA Second Team	2001
All-CCHA First Team	2002, 2003
CCHA Best Offensive Defenseman	2002, 2003
AHCA West Second-Team All-American	2002
AHCA West First-Team All-American	2003
NHL
All-Rookie Team	2004

Awards and achievements
Preceded by Greg Zanon	CCHA Best Offensive Defenseman; 2001–02; 2002–03	Succeeded by A. J. Thelen
