= John Gruden =

American ice hockey player and coach

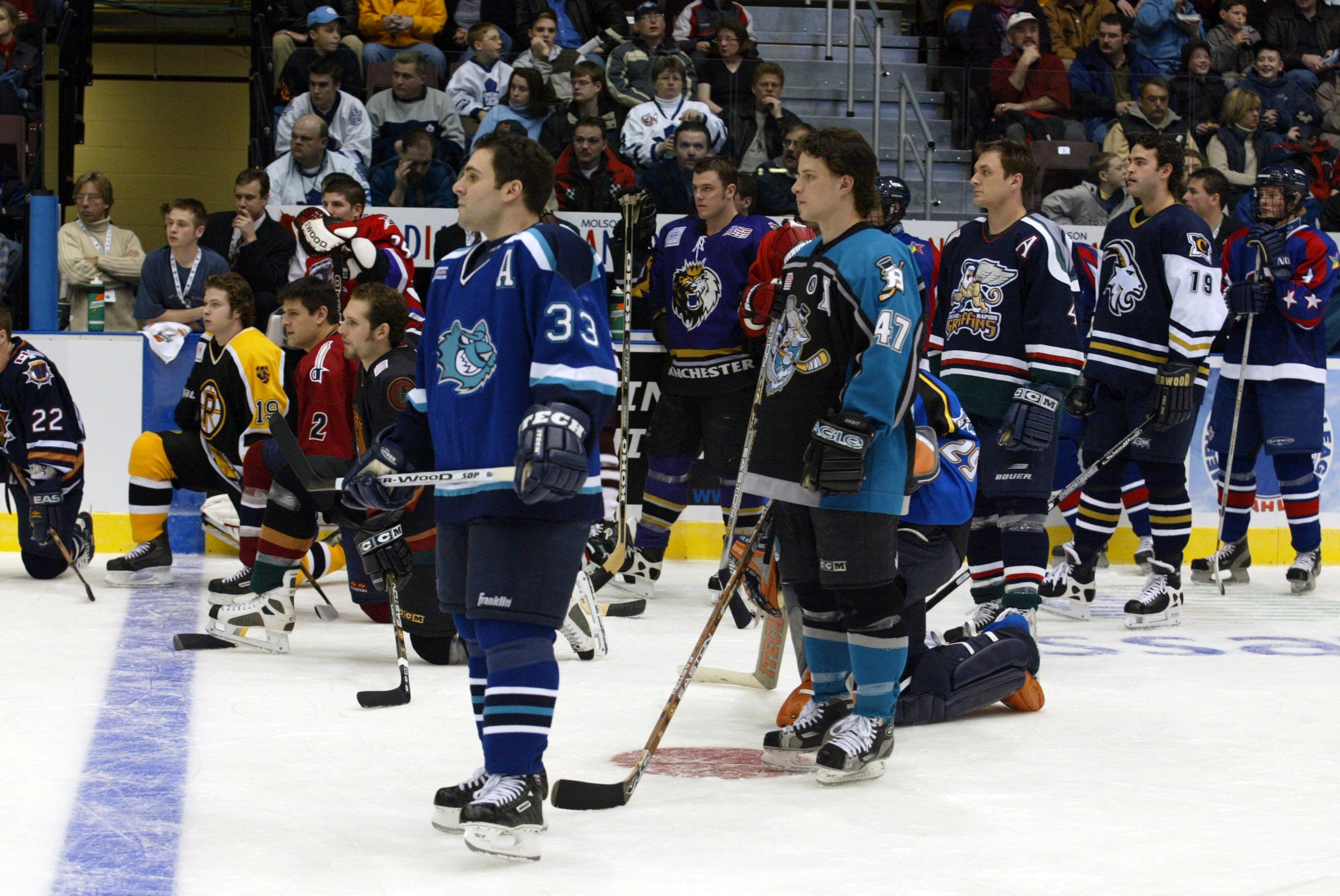
- Gruden in 2002
- Born: June 4, 1970 (age 56) Virginia, Minnesota, U.S.
- Height: 6 ft 1 in (185 cm)
- Weight: 195 lb (88 kg; 13 st 13 lb)
- Position: Defense
- Shot: Left
- Played for: Boston Bruins; Ottawa Senators; Eisbären Berlin; Washington Capitals
- Current NHL coach: Toronto Maple Leafs
- Coached for: Flint Firebirds; Hamilton Bulldogs; Toronto Marlies
- National team: United States
- NHL draft: 168th overall, 1990; Boston Bruins
- Playing career: 1994–2004
- Coaching career: 2005–present

John Daniel Gruden (born June 4, 1970) is an American professional ice hockey coach and former player. He is currently an assistant coach for the Toronto Maple Leafs of the National Hockey League (NHL). He was most recently head coach for the Toronto Marlies of the American Hockey League (AHL). Prior to Toronto, he served as an assistant coach for the Boston Bruins of the National Hockey League during the 2022–23 season. He also served as an assistant coach for the New York Islanders of the National Hockey League (NHL) from 2018 to 2022. He previously served as the head coach of the Hamilton Bulldogs and inaugural head coach of the Flint Firebirds of the Ontario Hockey League (OHL).

== Playing career ==
Gruden played high school hockey in Hastings, Minnesota in the late 1980s. Drafted 168th overall in the 1990 NHL entry draft by the Boston Bruins, Gruden played for the Bruins, Ottawa Senators and Washington Capitals, playing a total of 92 regular season games, scoring one goal and eight assists for nine points and collecting 46 penalty minutes. He also had a spell in the Deutsche Eishockey Liga in Germany for the Eisbären Berlin.

== Coaching career ==
Gruden has worked as an assistant coach for the Detroit Little Caesars AAA hockey club, coaching for their Squirt 2000 squad. He coached for a short stint for the storied Brother Rice JV prep squad (1–16). He also spends time doing work on behalf of the Red Wings Alumni Association. Gruden coached the Stoney Creek High School Cougars hockey team in Rochester, Michigan along with fellow NHL alumnus Greg Johnson.

More recently, Gruden served as an assistant coach for the USA Hockey National Team Development Program, helping lead the United States to a gold medal at the 2014 IIHF World U18 Championships.

On March 26, 2015, it was announced that Gruden would serve as the inaugural head coach for the Flint Firebirds of the Ontario Hockey League during the 2015–16 season. In a highly publicized incident, he was fired a month into the season. Reports claim the firing was due to refusing to increase the playing time of defenseman Håkon Nilsen, the team owner's son, however team president Costa Papista denied the reports. Following a successful player walkout, Gruden was reinstated as the Firebirds head coach and given a three-year contract extension. On February 17, 2016, Gruden was again fired by the Firebirds. On June 3, 2016, Gruden was named head coach of the Hamilton Bulldogs. Following the 2017–18 regular season, he led the Bulldogs as the OHL playoff champions.

On July 18, 2018, the New York Islanders hired Gruden as an assistant coach. On June 9, 2022, Gruden was relieved from his duties.

On July 20, 2022, the Boston Bruins hired Gruden as an assistant coach. Following the 2022–23 season, helping the Bruins to the most successful regular season in league history,

On July 4, 2023, the Toronto Marlies hired Gruden as head coach. In the 2025-26 season, Gruden coached the Marlies to their second Calder Cup in franchise history.

== Career statistics ==
=== Regular season and playoffs ===
			Regular season					Playoffs
Season	Team	League	GP	G	A	Pts	PIM	GP	G	A	Pts	PIM
1989–90	Waterloo Black Hawks	USHL	47	7	39	46	35	—	—	—	—	—
1990–91	Ferris State University	CCHA	39	4	11	15	29	—	—	—	—	—
1991–92	Ferris State University	CCHA	37	9	14	23	24	—	—	—	—	—
1992–93	Ferris State University	CCHA	41	16	14	30	58	—	—	—	—	—
1993–94	Ferris State University	CCHA	38	11	25	36	52	—	—	—	—	—
1993–94	Boston Bruins	NHL	7	0	1	1	2	—	—	—	—	—
1994–95	Providence Bruins	AHL	1	0	1	1	0	—	—	—	—	—
1994–95	Boston Bruins	NHL	38	0	6	6	22	—	—	—	—	—
1995–96	Providence Bruins	AHL	39	5	19	24	29	—	—	—	—	—
1995–96	Boston Bruins	NHL	14	0	0	0	4	3	0	1	1	0
1996–97	Providence Bruins	AHL	78	18	27	45	52	—	—	—	—	—
1997–98	Detroit Vipers	IHL	76	13	42	55	74	23	1	8	9	16
1998–99	Ottawa Senators	NHL	13	0	1	1	8	—	—	—	—	—
1998–99	Detroit Vipers	IHL	59	10	28	38	52	10	0	1	1	6
1999–00	Ottawa Senators	NHL	9	0	0	0	4	—	—	—	—	—
1999–00	Grand Rapids Griffins	IHL	50	5	17	22	24	12	1	4	5	8
2000–01	Grand Rapids Griffins	IHL	34	2	6	8	18	10	1	4	5	8
2001–02	Grand Rapids Griffins	AHL	57	3	14	17	48	5	1	0	1	2
2002–03	Eisbären Berlin	DEL	38	6	25	31	34	9	2	6	8	4
2003–04	Washington Capitals	NHL	11	1	0	1	6	—	—	—	—	—
NHL totals			92	1	8	9	46	3	0	1	1	0

=== International ===
Year	Team	Event	Result	GP	G	A	Pts	PIM
2003	United States	WC	13th	6	0	1	1	4
Senior totals				6	0	1	1	4

== Awards and honors ==
Award	Year
USHL
Defenseman of the Year	1990
College
All-CCHA First Team	1994
AHCA West First-Team All-American	1994
CCHA Best Offensive Defenseman	1994
IHL
Second All-Star Team	1998
AHL
All-Star Game	2002
First All-Star Team	2002

Awards and achievements
Preceded by Joe Cook	CCHA Best Offensive Defenseman; 1993–94	Succeeded by Kelly Perrault
