= Andy Greene =

American ice hockey player (born 1982)

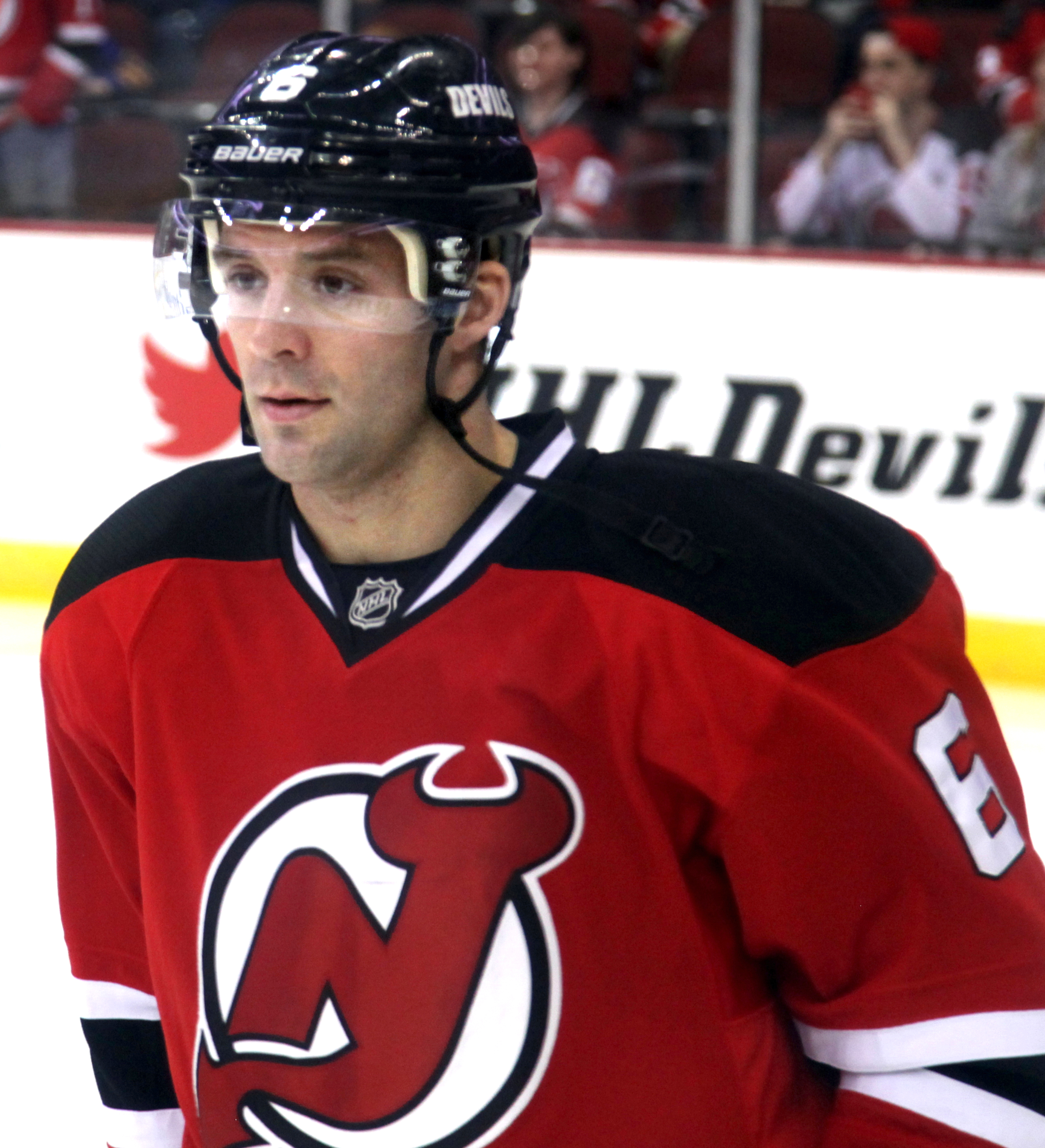
- Greene with the New Jersey Devils in 2014
- Born: October 30, 1982 (age 43) Trenton, Michigan, U.S.
- Height: 5 ft 11 in (180 cm)
- Weight: 190 lb (86 kg; 13 st 8 lb)
- Position: Defense
- Shot: Left
- Played for: New Jersey Devils; New York Islanders
- National team: United States
- NHL draft: Undrafted
- Playing career: 2006–2022

Andrew Greene (born October 30, 1982) is an American former professional ice hockey defenseman who played sixteen seasons in the National Hockey League (NHL), primarily for the New Jersey Devils, with whom he served as team captain. He also played for the New York Islanders.

== Playing career ==
=== College ===
Greene attended and played hockey at Miami University for the RedHawks men's ice hockey team. He was signed as an undrafted NHL free agent by the New Jersey Devils in 2006 and was assigned to the team's American Hockey League (AHL) affiliate, Lowell Devils, after New Jersey's training camp. He excelled at the AHL level, making the PlanetUSA All-Star Team.

=== New Jersey Devils ===
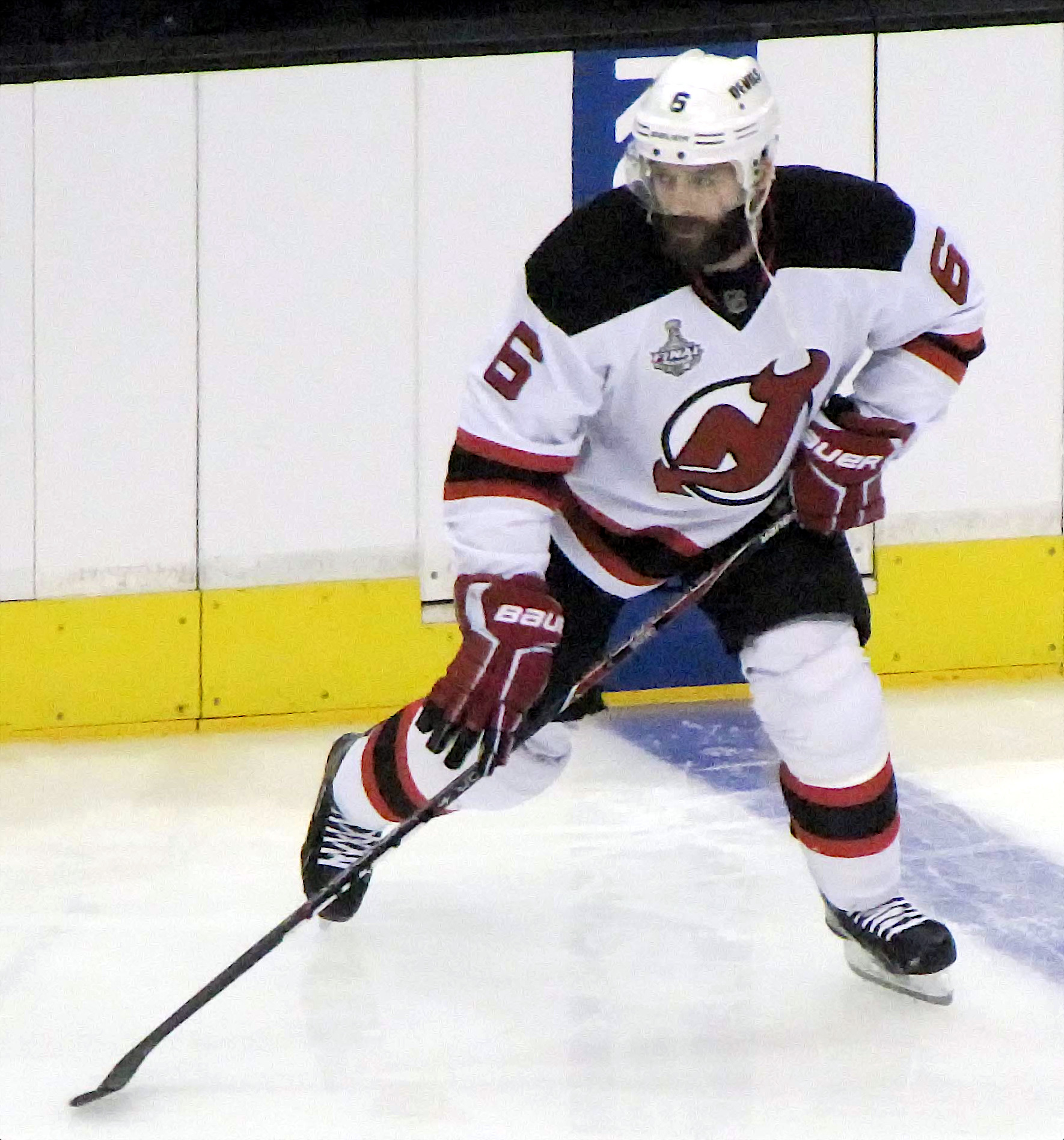
Greene with the Devils during the 2012 Stanley Cup Final

During his rookie professional season in 2006–07, Greene was called-up to the NHL for a short stint to replace the injured Johnny Oduya. Later in the season, he was again recalled when Colin White was injured. When the 2007 Stanley Cup playoffs began, the NHL salary cap no longer applied, allowing the Devils to add Greene to their permanent roster. With the return of injured defenseman Richard Matvichuk, it appeared as though Greene would sit. However, an injury to Colin White allowed Greene to remain on the roster. During this period, Greene played so well that, upon White's return, Oduya was scratched instead of Greene.

On July 1, 2011, Greene signed a new four-year, $14 million contract with the Devils.

On July 30, 2014, Greene signed a new five-year, $25 million contract with the Devils.

Before the start of the 2015–16 season, Greene was named the Devils' captain, following the retirement of incumbent captain Bryce Salvador.

The following season, Greene injured his hand in a game against the Carolina Hurricanes, resulting in him losing his streak of 350 consecutive NHL games played. His streak was the third-longest in Devils history, behind those of Travis Zajac and Ken Daneyko. At the conclusion of the season, Greene was the Devils' nominee for the Bill Masterton Memorial Trophy, awarded annually to the NHL player who best shows perseverance, sportsmanship and dedication to hockey.

=== New York Islanders and retirement ===
During the 2019–20 season, on February 16, 2020, Greene was traded to the New York Islanders in exchange for David Quenneville and a 2021 second-round pick. The move came following 14 seasons with the club. The trade reunited Greene with Islanders general manager Lou Lamoriello, who was general manager of the Devils in 2006 when Greene signed with the club. Greene scored his first playoff goal in 10 years during the Islanders' second round series against the Philadelphia Flyers. His previous playoff goal was in 2010, also against the Flyers.

On January 11, 2021, Greene was signed to a reported one-year, $700,000 extension with the Islanders.

On November 16, 2021, Greene played his 1000th NHL game.

After going unsigned in the 2022–23 offseason, Greene announced his retirement on October 12, 2022, signing a one-day contract to retire with the Devils.

== Personal life ==
Greene has three older brothers, David, Matt, and Shawn, all of whom played hockey. Greene was born prematurely on the way to his brother's hockey game.

Greene and his wife Rachel have two sons, Colton and Maddox. During off-seasons, Greene returned to his hometown to organize a hockey skills school called Andy Greene Hockey School.

Greene's former high school, Trenton High School, officially retired his number in 2012.

Greene holds a degree in education from Miami University. In 2019, he was inducted into the Miami Athletics Hall of Fame.

== Career statistics ==
=== Regular season and playoffs ===
			Regular season					Playoffs
Season	Team	League	GP	G	A	Pts	PIM	GP	G	A	Pts	PIM
2000–01	Detroit Compuware Ambassadors	NAHL	54	7	24	31	60	—	—	—	—	—
2001–02	Detroit Compuware Ambassadors	NAHL	53	16	29	45	88	—	—	—	—	—
2002–03	Miami University	CCHA	41	4	19	23	64	—	—	—	—	—
2003–04	Miami University	CCHA	41	7	19	26	78	—	—	—	—	—
2004–05	Miami University	CCHA	38	7	27	34	66	—	—	—	—	—
2005–06	Miami University	CCHA	39	9	22	31	48	—	—	—	—	—
2006–07	Lowell Devils	AHL	52	5	16	21	28	—	—	—	—	—
2006–07	New Jersey Devils	NHL	23	1	5	6	6	11	2	1	3	2
2007–08	New Jersey Devils	NHL	59	2	8	10	22	2	0	0	0	0
2008–09	New Jersey Devils	NHL	49	2	7	9	22	3	0	1	1	0
2009–10	New Jersey Devils	NHL	78	6	31	37	14	5	1	1	2	6
2010–11	New Jersey Devils	NHL	82	4	19	23	22	—	—	—	—	—
2011–12	New Jersey Devils	NHL	56	1	15	16	16	24	0	1	1	8
2012–13	New Jersey Devils	NHL	48	4	12	16	20	—	—	—	—	—
2013–14	New Jersey Devils	NHL	82	8	24	32	32	—	—	—	—	—
2014–15	New Jersey Devils	NHL	82	3	19	22	20	—	—	—	—	—
2015–16	New Jersey Devils	NHL	82	4	9	13	26	—	—	—	—	—
2016–17	New Jersey Devils	NHL	66	4	9	13	8	—	—	—	—	—
2017–18	New Jersey Devils	NHL	81	3	10	13	21	5	0	2	2	6
2018–19	New Jersey Devils	NHL	82	5	20	25	16	—	—	—	—	—
2019–20	New Jersey Devils	NHL	53	2	9	11	14	—	—	—	—	—
2019–20	New York Islanders	NHL	10	0	3	3	2	21	2	2	4	12
2020–21	New York Islanders	NHL	55	1	4	5	6	19	0	1	1	8
2021–22	New York Islanders	NHL	69	2	8	10	10	—	—	—	—	—
NHL totals			1,057	52	212	264	277	90	5	9	14	42

=== International ===
Year	Team	Event	Result	GP	G	A	Pts	PIM
2010	United States	WC	13th	6	0	2	2	0
Senior totals				6	0	2	2	0

== Awards and honors ==
Award	Year
College
All-CCHA Rookie Team	2002–03
All-CCHA First Team	2003–04
CCHA All-Tournament Team	2004, 2006
All-CCHA First Team	2004–05
AHCA West Second-Team All-American	2004–05
All-CCHA First Team	2005–06
AHCA West First-Team All-American	2005–06

Awards and achievements
Preceded by A. J. Thelen	CCHA Best Offensive Defenseman; 2005, 2006	Succeeded by Jack Johnson
Preceded by Nathan Oystrick	CCHA Best Defensive Defenseman; 2006	Succeeded by Matt Hunwick
Preceded by Bryce Salvador	New Jersey Devils captain 2015–20	Succeeded by Nico Hischier
