= Brian Holzinger =

American ice hockey player (born 1972)

- Born: October 10, 1972 (age 53) Parma, Ohio, U.S.
- Height: 5 ft 11 in (180 cm)
- Weight: 186 lb (84 kg; 13 st 4 lb)
- Position: Center
- Shot: Right
- Played for: Buffalo Sabres; Tampa Bay Lightning; Pittsburgh Penguins; Columbus Blue Jackets
- National team: United States
- NHL draft: 124th overall, 1991; Buffalo Sabres
- Playing career: 1995–2004

Brian Alan Holzinger (born October 10, 1972) is an American former professional ice hockey center. He played in the National Hockey League (NHL) with the Buffalo Sabres, Tampa Bay Lightning, Pittsburgh Penguins and Columbus Blue Jackets.

== Playing career ==
Holzinger was drafted in the sixth round, 124th overall, by the Buffalo Sabres in the 1991 NHL entry draft. He played High School Hockey at Padua Franciscan High School in Parma, Ohio and four years of college hockey at Bowling Green State University, and was the recipient of the Hobey Baker Award for top men's collegiate hockey player during his senior season. He made his National Hockey League debut with the Sabres during the 1994–95 season, appearing in four regular season games and four playoff games (scoring two goals during the Sabres' playoff series against the Philadelphia Flyers). After four and a half seasons with the Sabres, he was traded at the trade deadline of the 1999–2000 season (along with Cory Sarich and Wayne Primeau) to the Tampa Bay Lightning in exchange for Chris Gratton and a second-round draft pick.

In his first full season with the Lightning in 2000–01, Holzinger posted 36 points in 70 games. The following 2001–02 season, Brian was hampered by a shoulder injury that limited him to only 23 games. A broken leg suffered just prior to the 2002–03 season ensured Holzinger was again on the sidelines for the first half of the year. After being nursed back to health by his wife Lori, Holzinger was traded at the trade deadline, this time to the Pittsburgh Penguins in exchange for Marc Bergevin. In the 2003–04 season, once again at the trade deadline, the Penguins traded Holzinger to the Columbus Blue Jackets in exchange for Lasse Pirjetä. As a result of this trade, Holzinger was the third Ohio native to play for the Blue Jackets franchise.

After retiring from the NHL, Holzinger went on to dominate the PPC Employee Golf Matches over the next decade. His 51-3 helped to add to his championship legacy.

In his NHL career, Holzinger appeared in 547 regular season games. He scored 93 goals and added 145 assists. In 52 Stanley Cup playoff games, he scored 11 goals and 18 assists.

== Career statistics ==
=== Regular season and playoffs ===
			Regular season					Playoffs
Season	Team	League	GP	G	A	Pts	PIM	GP	G	A	Pts	PIM
1988–89	Padua Franciscan High School	HS-OH	35	73	65	138	—	—	—	—	—	—
1989–90	Compuware Ambassadors	NAHL	44	36	37	63	—	—	—	—	—	—
1990–91	Compuware Ambassadors	NAHL	37	45	41	86	16	—	—	—	—	—
1991–92	Bowling Green State U.	CCHA	30	14	8	22	36	—	—	—	—	—
1992–93	Bowling Green State U.	CCHA	41	31	26	57	44	—	—	—	—	—
1993–94	Bowling Green State U.	CCHA	38	22	15	37	24	—	—	—	—	—
1994–95	Bowling Green State U.	CCHA	38	35	34	69	42	—	—	—	—	—
1994–95	Buffalo Sabres	NHL	4	0	3	3	0	4	2	1	3	2
1995–96	Buffalo Sabres	NHL	58	10	10	20	37	—	—	—	—	—
1995–96	Rochester Americans	AHL	17	10	11	21	14	19	10	14	24	10
1996–97	Buffalo Sabres	NHL	81	22	29	51	54	12	2	5	7	8
1997–98	Buffalo Sabres	NHL	69	14	21	35	36	15	4	7	11	18
1998–99	Buffalo Sabres	NHL	81	17	17	34	45	21	3	5	8	33
1999–2000	Buffalo Sabres	NHL	59	7	17	24	30	—	—	—	—	—
1999–2000	Tampa Bay Lightning	NHL	14	3	3	6	21	—	—	—	—	—
2000–01	Tampa Bay Lightning	NHL	70	11	25	36	64	—	—	—	—	—
2001–02	Tampa Bay Lightning	NHL	23	1	2	3	4	—	—	—	—	—
2002–03	Tampa Bay Lightning	NHL	5	0	1	1	2	—	—	—	—	—
2002–03	Springfield Falcons	AHL	28	6	20	26	16	—	—	—	—	—
2002–03	Pittsburgh Penguins	NHL	9	1	2	3	6	—	—	—	—	—
2003–04	Pittsburgh Penguins	NHL	61	6	15	21	38	—	—	—	—	—
2003–04	Columbus Blue Jackets	NHL	13	1	0	1	2	—	—	—	—	—
NHL totals			547	93	145	238	339	52	11	18	29	61

=== International ===
Year	Team	Event	GP	G	A	Pts	PIM
1992	United States	WJC	7	1	1	2	2

== Awards and honours ==
Award	Year
All-CCHA Second Team	1992–93
All-CCHA First Team	1994–95
AHCA West First-Team All-American	1994–95
NCAA Hobey Baker Award	1994–95
Calder Cup Rochester Americans	1995–96

Awards and achievements
Preceded by Chris Marinucci	Winner of the Hobey Baker Award; 1994–95	Succeeded by Brian Bonin
Preceded by David Oliver	CCHA Player of the Year; 1994–95	Succeeded by Brendan Morrison
