= Brian Bonin =

American ice hockey player (born 1973)

- Born: November 28, 1973 (age 52) Saint Paul, Minnesota, U.S.
- Height: 5 ft 10 in (178 cm)
- Weight: 187 lb (85 kg; 13 st 5 lb)
- Position: Center
- Shot: Left
- Played for: Pittsburgh Penguins; Minnesota Wild; SC Langnau
- National team: United States
- NHL draft: 211th overall, 1992; Pittsburgh Penguins
- Playing career: 1996–2005

Brian Raymond Bonin (born November 28, 1973) is an American former professional ice hockey center. He was drafted in the ninth round, 211th overall, by the Pittsburgh Penguins in the 1992 NHL entry draft.

== Playing career ==
After being named Minnesota Mr. Hockey in 1992 for his play at White Bear Lake Area High School, Bonin entered the University of Minnesota. His stellar time with the Golden Gophers culminated with winning the Hobey Baker Award, given to the most outstanding collegiate hockey player in the NCAA, in his senior season. Bonin led the nation in scoring during the 1995-1996 season at the University of Minnesota, and was named a first-team All-American, WCHA Player of the Year, first-team All-WCHA, and team Most Valuable Player in both his junior and senior seasons

Bonin made his professional debut with the IHL's Cleveland Lumberjacks in the 1996–97 season. He then joined the AHL's Syracuse Crunch for the 1997–98 season, tallying 69 points in 67 games.

Bonin made his NHL debut with the Penguins in the 1998–99 season, appearing in five regular-season and three playoff games. The rest of the season was split between the IHL's Kansas City Blades and the AHL's Adirondack Red Wings. After another full season with the Syracuse Crunch and most of one with the Cleveland Lumberjacks, Bonin joined the Minnesota Wild for seven NHL games in the 2000–01 season.

In his 12 career NHL games, Bonin was held off the scoresheet. He also went scoreless in his three career Stanley Cup playoff games.

== Career statistics ==
=== Regular season and playoffs ===
			Regular season					Playoffs
Season	Team	League	GP	G	A	Pts	PIM	GP	G	A	Pts	PIM
1991–92	White Bear Lake High School	HS-MN	23	22	35	57	8	—	—	—	—	—
1992–93	University of Minnesota	WCHA	38	10	18	28	10	—	—	—	—	—
1993–94	University of Minnesota	WCHA	42	24	20	44	14	—	—	—	—	—
1994–95	University of Minnesota	WCHA	44	32	31	63	28	—	—	—	—	—
1995–96	University of Minnesota	WCHA	42	34	47	81	30	—	—	—	—	—
1996–97	Cleveland Lumberjacks	IHL	60	13	26	39	18	1	1	0	1	0
1997–98	Syracuse Crunch	AHL	67	31	38	69	46	5	1	3	4	6
1998–99	Adirondack Red Wings	AHL	54	19	16	35	31	2	0	0	0	0
1998–99	Pittsburgh Penguins	NHL	5	0	0	0	0	3	0	0	0	0
1998–99	Kansas City Blades	IHL	19	2	5	7	10	—	—	—	—	—
1999–00	Syracuse Crunch	AHL	67	19	28	47	20	4	0	1	1	0
2000–01	Cleveland Lumberjacks	IHL	72	35	42	77	45	4	2	0	2	0
2000–01	Minnesota Wild	NHL	7	0	0	0	0	—	—	—	—	—
2001–02	SC Langnau	NLA	40	19	18	37	26	—	—	—	—	—
2002–03	SC Langnau	NLA	44	15	22	37	26	—	—	—	—	—
2004–05	Worcester IceCats	AHL	4	1	0	1	0	—	—	—	—	—
IHL totals			151	50	73	123	73	5	3	0	3	0
AHL totals			192	70	82	152	97	11	1	4	5	6
NHL totals			12	0	0	0	0	3	0	0	0	0

Medal record

Representing United States

Ice hockey

World Championships
Silver medal – second place	1996 Austria	

=== International ===
Year	Team	Event	Result	GP	G	A	Pts	PIM
1996	United States	WC	3rd place, bronze medalist(s)	8	1	0	1	2
Senior totals				8	1	0	1	2

== Awards and honors ==
Award	Year	Ref
College
All-WCHA Rookie Team	1992–93	
WCHA All-Tournament Team	1994	
All-WCHA First Team	1994–95	
AHCA West First-Team All-American	1994–95	
All-WCHA First Team	1995–96	
AHCA West First-Team All-American	1995–96	
WCHA All-Tournament Team	1996	
Hobey Baker Award	1996	
IHL
Second All-Star Team	2001	

Awards and achievements
Preceded by Darby Hendrickson	Minnesota Mr. Hockey; 1991–92 season	Succeeded by Nick Checco
Preceded by Chris Marinucci	WCHA Player of the Year; 1994–95, 1995–96	Succeeded by Mike Crowley
Preceded by Brian Holzinger	Winner of the Hobey Baker Award; 1995–96	Succeeded by Brendan Morrison
Preceded by Kirk Daubenspeck	WCHA Most Valuable Player in Tournament; 1996	Succeeded by David Hoogsteen
