= Central Collegiate Hockey Association =

US college ice hockey conference

- Association: NCAA
- Founded: 1971
- Commissioner: Don Lucia (since 2020)
- Sports fielded: Ice hockey; men's: yes; women's: no
- Division: Division I
- No. of teams: 8
- Headquarters: Deephaven, Minnesota
- Region: Midwestern United States
- Website: ccha.com

The Central Collegiate Hockey Association (CCHA) is a college athletic conference in the Midwestern United States that participates in NCAA Division I as a hockey-only conference. The current CCHA began play in the 2021–22 season; a previous iteration, which the current CCHA recognizes as part of its history, existed from 1971 to 2013. Four of its nine members are located in the state of Michigan, with three in Minnesota and one each in Ohio and South Dakota. It has also had teams located in Alaska, Illinois, Indiana, Missouri, and Nebraska over the course of its existence.

The CCHA was disbanded after the 2012–13 season as the result of a conference realignment stemming from the Big Ten Conference (of which three CCHA schools—Michigan, Michigan State, and Ohio State—were primary members) choosing to sponsor Division I ice hockey beginning in the 2013–14 season. The remaining CCHA members received invitations to other conferences, such as the newly formed National Collegiate Hockey Conference (NCHC), Hockey East, and the Western Collegiate Hockey Association (WCHA), which itself had been depleted by the Big Ten and NCHC. The conference's last game before its hiatus was the final of the 2013 CCHA Men's Ice Hockey Tournament at Joe Louis Arena in Detroit, where Notre Dame beat Michigan 3–1 to win the Mason Cup championship.

On February 18, 2020, seven schools who had applied to leave the WCHA announced they would form a new CCHA for the 2021–22 season, citing a more compact geographic footprint and a desire to improve regional alignment, among other reasons. St. Thomas, a former D-III school, joined them in the first season post-revival, and Augustana, a newly sponsored hockey program, joined two years later.

== History ==
=== Foundation ===
The CCHA began in 1971 as an NCAA conference composed of Bowling Green, Ohio, Ohio State and Saint Louis. After adding Lake Superior State for year two, both Ohio State and Ohio withdrew from the conference, leaving the CCHA with a scant 3 members. Despite the trouble, the three teams rode out the rough patch and the league began to grow with the addition of Western Michigan and the return of Ohio State.

=== NCAA acceptance ===
Up until 1976 the NCAA had only offered bids to the tournament from teams in either ECAC Hockey or the WCHA. Because those were the only two Division I conferences for most years there was no controversy but, after the CCHA had proved to be more than just a flash in the pan, the tournament had to change. Beginning with the 1977 Championship the NCAA allowed itself the freedom to add up to four additional teams to the tournament with the understanding that the CCHA tournament champion would receive one of the additional bids. Bowling Green won the first tournament game for the conference but it was not until Northern Michigan reached the championship game in 1980 that the league began to gain acceptance.

=== WCHA defectors ===
The 1981 season saw a major shift in college ice hockey, as four teams from the WCHA defected to the CCHA; Michigan, Michigan State, Michigan Tech, and Notre Dame. The move was done as a way to reduce travel costs as well as provide the new teams with a better chance at making the NCAA Tournament, as at the time many of the existing CCHA programs were seen as less competitive than their WCHA brethren. Michigan State made the tournament in its first three season of CCHA play but it was founding member Bowling Green that won the conference's first national championship in 1984.

=== National prominence ===
Bill Beagan served as commissioner of the CCHA from 1985 to 1998 and is credited with modernizing the league. A former NHL referee, Beagan took a special interest in improving officiating standards. He instituted a pre-season training camp for referees (which did not go without objection, as some existing officials went on strike rather than report to camp) and developed a working relationship with the NHL to train and scout officials in college hockey.

Beagan also sought to develop college hockey as a marketable product, signing a national television contract for a CCHA "game of the week" and airing a weekly highlights/magazine show on cable sports networks throughout the Midwest, including Pro Am Sports System, Prime Sports and Fox Sports Net. He introduced instant replay to the CCHA in 1993, to be used at its league championships, and arranged for the CCHA Men's Ice Hockey Tournament finals to be played at Joe Louis Arena. The "Road to the Joe" became a closely-followed affair as strong regional rivalries and close competition led to sellout crowds for the CCHA tournament.

Prior to Beagan's arrival, the CCHA had not been a profitable association. After 10 years as commissioner, the league had made $4 million. Profits were shared with the schools, which were reinvested into hockey programs and new arenas. On-ice results improved during his tenure, and CCHA teams won six NCAA Division I Men's Ice Hockey Tournament championships. In addition, Beagan convinced the University of Notre Dame to rejoin the league; the Irish had left the CCHA in 1983 when the university briefly demoted the program to club status, and when scholarship varsity hockey returned they competed for six seasons as an independent.

Building on Bowling Green State's national title in 1984, the CCHA established itself further as the Michigan State Spartans won their second national championship and first as a member of the CCHA in 1986; two years later, the Lake Superior State Lakers won the 1988 national championship, their first NCAA championship. Lake Superior State would continue its NCAA success by winning both the 1992 and 1994 NCAA ice hockey championships and finishing as the national runner-up in 1993. In addition to the success of the Lakers and Spartans, the Michigan Wolverines began a streak of 22 consecutive tournament appearances in 1991, winning national titles in 1996 and 1998. While the conference and most of its teams were stable throughout the early 21st century, the CCHA suffered a mortal blow at the end of the decade.

=== Realignment and discontinuation ===
Pennsylvania State University announced on September 17, 2010, the transition of its men's and women's American Collegiate Hockey Association (ACHA) programs to NCAA Division I status in 2012. Just over a month earlier, then-commissioner Tom Anastos publicly stated that the CCHA would strongly consider adding the Nittany Lions as the conference's 12th member. Instead, the league was left to deal with the imminent departures of Michigan, Michigan State and Ohio State when the Big Ten Conference disclosed on March 21, 2011, that it would sponsor men's hockey beginning with the 2013–14 season, as Penn State's move to Division I meant that six full Big Ten members played the sport, the minimum number required to earn an automatic bid to the NCAA tournament. Joining the existing CCHA members were the University of Minnesota and the University of Wisconsin from the WCHA, as well as Penn State.

The next school slated to leave the CCHA in 2013 was Miami University which became a charter member of the NCHC on July 15, 2011. Western Michigan accepted an invitation to join the new league just over two months later on September 22.

The demise of the CCHA was further accelerated when the five remaining members decided to move to the WCHA following the 2012–13 campaign. Northern Michigan University, returning to the WCHA after leaving in 1997, was the first to make the announcement on July 20, followed by Alaska, Ferris State and Lake Superior State on August 26 and Bowling Green on October 4.

Notre Dame accepted an invitation to the Hockey East Association in a press conference on October 5, 2011. The Irish would reunite with several former CCHA rivals when the program left Hockey East to join the Big Ten as a hockey-only affiliate in 2017.

=== Revival ===
On June 28, 2019, seven schools from the ten-member WCHA began the process of withdrawing from the conference, with the intent of forming a new conference for the 2021–22 season. These seven schools were Bemidji State, Bowling Green (who had retained the rights to the CCHA name), Ferris State, Lake Superior State, Michigan Tech, Minnesota State and Northern Michigan. The seven schools cited a more compact geographic footprint as one reason for the move; the remaining three WCHA members, Alabama-Huntsville, Alaska and Alaska–Anchorage, all geographic outliers in the WCHA, were notably absent. On February 18, 2020, these seven schools announced they would begin competing in a new CCHA in 2021–22. Later that year, the University of St. Thomas, a former D-III school who had been granted a waiver by the NCAA earlier in the year to transition directly to D-I, was announced to be joining the new CCHA as a member on July 29, 2020, bringing the membership up to an even eight teams.

Don Lucia, a former head coach at Alaska, Colorado College, and Minnesota, was named as commissioner of the new CCHA on June 17, 2020. A new league logo was introduced shortly thereafter.

On May 17, 2022, Augustana University was announced as the league's ninth member. They gained full membership in the conference in the 2024–25 season with a partial league schedule. The Vikings played with a partial league schedule in the 2023–24 and 2024–25 seasons, then began a full league schedule in the 2025–26 season.

On May 15, 2024, St. Thomas announced they would leave the league following the 2025–26 season to become the tenth member of the NCHC. This returned the league to eight member schools for the 2026–27 season.

== Current members ==
Institution	Location	Nickname	Founded	Affiliation	Enrollment	Joined	Women's conference	Previous conference	Primary conference	Colors
Augustana University	Sioux Falls, South Dakota	Vikings	1860	Private/Lutheran (ELCA)	2,570	2023	N/A	N/A	NSIC (NCAA D-II)	
Bemidji State University	Bemidji, Minnesota	Beavers	1919	Public	3,926	2021	WCHA	WCHA	NSIC (NCAA D-II)	
Bowling Green State University	Bowling Green, Ohio	Falcons	1910	Public	17,594	2021 (Note: Bowling Green was previously a member of the CCHA from 1971 to 2013.)	N/A	WCHA	MAC	
Ferris State University	Big Rapids, Michigan	Bulldogs	1884	Public	9,959	2021 (Note: Ferris State was previously a member of the CCHA from 1978 to 2013.)	N/A	WCHA	GLIAC (NCAA D-II)	
Lake Superior State University	Sault Ste. Marie, Michigan	Lakers	1946	Public	1,567	2021 (Note: Lake Superior State was previously a member of the CCHA from 1972 to 2013.)	N/A	WCHA	GLIAC (NCAA D-II)	
Michigan Technological University	Houghton, Michigan	Huskies	1885	Public	7,429	2021 (Note: Michigan Tech was previously a member of the CCHA from 1981 to 1984.)	N/A	WCHA	GLIAC (NCAA D-II)	
Minnesota State University	Mankato, Minnesota	Mavericks	1868	Public	15,251	2021	WCHA	WCHA	NSIC (NCAA D-II)	
Northern Michigan University	Marquette, Michigan	Wildcats	1899	Public	7,409	2021 (Note: Northern Michigan was previously a member of the CCHA from 1977 to 1984, and again from 1997 to 2013.)	N/A	WCHA	GLIAC (NCAA D-II)	

Central Collegiate Hockey Association
Current CCHA members: full member

== Former members ==
Institution	Location	Nickname	Founded	Affiliation	Joined	Left	Subsequent conference	Current conference
University of Alaska Fairbanks	Fairbanks, Alaska	Nanooks	1917	Public	1995	2013	WCHA	Independent
University of Illinois at Chicago	Chicago, Illinois	Flames	1946	Public	1982	1996	dropped program as school sponsored sport	
Kent State University	Kent, Ohio	Golden Flashes	1910	Public	1992	1994	dropped program as school sponsored sport	
Miami University	Oxford, Ohio	RedHawks	1809	Public	1980	2013	NCHC	
University of Michigan	Ann Arbor, Michigan	Wolverines	1817	Public	1981	2013	Big Ten	
Michigan State University	East Lansing, Michigan	Spartans	1855	Public	1981	2013	Big Ten	
University of Nebraska Omaha	Omaha, Nebraska	Mavericks	1908	Public	1999	2010	WCHA	NCHC
University of Notre Dame	Notre Dame, Indiana	Fighting Irish	1842	Private/Catholic	1981; 1992	1983; 2013	Dropped to club status Hockey East	Big Ten
Ohio University	Athens, Ohio	Bobcats	1804	Public	1971	1973	dropped program as school sponsored sport	
Ohio State University	Columbus, Ohio	Buckeyes	1870	Public	1971; 1975	1973; 2013	Independent; Big Ten	Big Ten
Saint Louis University	St. Louis, Missouri	Billikens	1818	Private/Catholic	1971	1979	dropped program as school sponsored sport	
University of St. Thomas	Saint Paul, Minnesota	Tommies	1885	Private/Catholic (diocesan)	2021	2026	NCHC	
Western Michigan University	Kalamazoo, Michigan	Broncos	1903	Public	1975	2013	NCHC	

== Membership timeline ==
CCHA Member Member of Other D1 Conference Independent D1 Team

== Championships ==
School	NCAA championships	NCAA runner-up	NCAA Frozen Fours appearances	NCAA tournament appearances	Conference championships	Conference tournament championships
Augustana						
Bemidji State			1 (2009)	5 (2005, 2006, 2009, 2010, 2021)	7 (2004, 2005, 2008, 2009, 2010, 2017, 2024)	3 (2005, 2006, 2009)
Bowling Green	1 (1984)		2 (1978, 1984)	10 (1977-79, 1982, 1984, 1987-90, 2019)	7 (1976, 1978, 1979, 1982-84, 1987)	5 (1973, 1977-79, 1988)
Ferris State		1 (2012)	1 (2012)	4 (2003, 2012, 2014, 2016)	3 (2003, 2012, 2014)	1 (2016)
Lake Superior State	3 (1988, 1992, 1994)	1 (1993)	4 (1988, 1992, 1993, 1994)	11 (1985, 1988-96, 2021)	4 (1974, 1988, 1991, 1996)	5 (1991-93, 1995, 2021)
Michigan Tech	3 (1962, 1965, 1975)	4 (1956, 1960, 1974, 1976)	10 (1956, 1960, 1962, 1965, 1969, 1970, 1974-76, 1981)	16 (1956, 1960, 1962, 1965, 1969, 1970, 1974-76, 1981, 2015, 2017, 2018, 2022-24)	7 (1962, 1966, 1969, 1971, 1974, 1976, 2016)	12 (1960, 1962, 1965, 1969, 1970, 1974-76, 1981, 2017, 2018, 2024)
Minnesota State		1 (2022)	2 (2021, 2022)	10 (2003, 2013-15, 2018, 2019, 2021-23, 2025)	10 (2015, 2016, 2018-23, 2025, 2026)	6 (2014, 2015, 2019, 2022, 2023, 2025, 2026)
Northern Michigan	1 (1991)	1 (1980)	3 (1980, 1981, 1991)	8 (1980, 1981, 1989, 1991-93, 1999, 2010)	3 (1980, 1981, 1991)	5 (1980, 1981, 1989, 1991, 1992)

== Regular-season champions ==
- 1972 Ohio State/Saint Louis
- 1973 Saint Louis
- 1974 Lake Superior State/Saint Louis
- 1975 Saint Louis
- 1976 Bowling Green
- 1977 Saint Louis
- 1978 Bowling Green
- 1979 Bowling Green
- 1980 Northern Michigan
- 1981 Northern Michigan
- 1982 Bowling Green
- 1983 Bowling Green
- 1984 Bowling Green
- 1985 Michigan State
- 1986 Michigan State
- 1987 Bowling Green
- 1988 Lake Superior State
- 1989 Michigan State
- 1990 Michigan State
- 1991 Lake Superior State
- 1992 Lake Superior State
- 1993 Miami
- 1994 Michigan
- 1995 Michigan
- 1996 Lake Superior State/Michigan
- 1997 Michigan
- 1998 Michigan State
- 1999 Michigan State
- 2000 Michigan
- 2001 Michigan State
- 2002 Michigan
- 2003 Ferris State
- 2004 Michigan
- 2005 Michigan
- 2006 Miami
- 2007 Notre Dame
- 2008 Michigan
- 2009 Notre Dame
- 2010 Miami
- 2011 Michigan
- 2012 Ferris State
- 2013 Miami
- 2022 Minnesota State
- 2023 Minnesota State
- 2024 Bemidji State
- 2025 Minnesota State
- 2026 Minnesota State

== Conference records ==
Team's records against current conference opponents. (As of the end of the 2025–26 season.)

School	Bemidji State			Bowling Green			Ferris State			Lake Superior State			Michigan Tech			Minnesota State			Northern Michigan			Augustana			Total			
School	W	L	T	W	L	T	W	L	T	W	L	T	W	L	T	W	L	T	W	L	T	W	L	T	W	L	T	Win%
Bemidji State				22	23	5	25	24	6	43	42	6	24	28	10	26	53	6	24	16	7	6	6	1	170	192	41	.473
Bowling Green	23	22	5				90	67	14	103	82	13	27	31	6	11	30	6	66	63	11	1	4	1	321	299	56	.516
Ferris State	24	25	6	67	90	14				68	89	16	19	39	3	14	45	2	33	54	8	4	4	0	229	346	49	.406
Lake Superior State	42	43	6	82	103	13	89	68	16				32	57	10	5	40	2	62	84	13	2	6	0	314	401	60	.444
Michigan Tech	28	24	10	31	27	6	39	19	3	57	32	10				32	58	11	90	82	15	4	1	1	281	243	56	.533
Minnesota State	53	26	6	30	11	6	45	14	2	40	5	2	58	32	11				34	9	6	4	1	2	264	98	35	.709
Northern Michigan	16	24	7	63	66	11	54	33	8	84	62	13	82	90	15	9	34	6				0	7	1	308	316	61	.494
Augustana	6	6	1	4	1	1	4	4	0	6	2	0	1	4	1	1	4	2	7	0	1				29	21	6	.571

== Conference arenas ==
School	Arena	Location	Capacity
Augustana	Midco Arena	Sioux Falls, South Dakota	3,082
Bemidji State	Sanford Center	Bemidji, Minnesota	4,373
Bowling Green	Slater Family Ice Arena	Bowling Green, Ohio	5,000
Ferris State	Robert L. Ewigleben Arena	Big Rapids, Michigan	2,500
Lake Superior State	Taffy Abel Arena	Sault Ste. Marie, Michigan	4,000
Michigan Tech	MacInnes Student Ice Arena	Houghton, Michigan	4,466
Minnesota State	Mayo Clinic Health System Event Center	Mankato, Minnesota	4,832
Northern Michigan	Berry Events Center	Marquette, Michigan	3,800

== Awards ==
At the conclusion of each regular season schedule the coaches of each CCHA team vote which players they choose to be on the three All-Conference Teams: first team, second team and rookie team. Additionally they vote to award up to 9 of the 12 individual trophies to an eligible player at the same time (depending upon the year). The CCHA also awards a Perani Cup, a Humanitarian Award, which are awarded rather than voted upon, and a Most Valuable Player in Tournament which is voted on at the conclusion of the conference tournament. None of the individual awards conferred by the CCHA have been given for the entire existence of the conference. Only the Tournament MVP was awarded in the inaugural CCHA season, but that award was discontinued thereafter until 1982. Several of the aforementioned awards were revived along with the league in 2021–22. The awards presented by the original CCHA for best offensive and defensive defenseman were merged into a single award for best defenseman, and the original CCHA's award for best defensive forward was folded into the award for best forward.

=== All-Conference Teams ===
Award	Inaugural Year
First Team	1972–73
Second Team	1972–73
Rookie Team	1988–89
All-Tournament Team	1972

=== Individual awards ===
==== Current ====
Award	Inaugural Year
Player of the Year	1976–77
Forward of the Year	2021–22
Defenseman of the Year	2021–22
Goaltender of the Year	2000–01
Rookie of the Year	1978–79
Best Defensive Forward	1989–90
Best Defensive Defenseman	1989–90
Coach of the Year	1975–76
Most Valuable Player in Tournament	1972

==== Former ====
Award	Inaugural Year
Best Offensive Defenseman	1989–90
Terry Flanagan Memorial Award	1992–93
Mike and Marian Ilitch Humanitarian Award	2000–01
Perani Cup	2002–03
Scholar-Athlete of the Year	2004–05

== All-Decade Teams ==
=== 1970s All-Decade Team ===
1970s All-Decade Team

==== First Team ====
- F Steve Bozek, 1978–81, Northern Michigan
- F Bill Joyce, 1976–80, Northern Michigan
- F John Markell, 1975–79, Bowling Green
- D Tom Laidlaw, 1976–80, Northern Michigan
- D Ken Morrow, 1975–79, Bowling Green
- G Mike Liut, 1973–77, Bowling Green

==== Second Team ====
- F Bob Dobek, 1972–75, Bowling Green
- F Rick Kennedy, 1971–75, Saint Louis
- F Mark Wells, 1975–79, Bowling Green
- D Roger Archer, 1971–75, Bowling Green
- D Tom Davies, 1970–74, D, Lake Superior State
- D Don Waddell, 1976–80, Northern Michigan
- G Steve Weeks, 1976–1980, Northern Michigan

=== 1980s All-Decade Team ===
1980s All-Decade Team

==== First Team ====
- F Nelson Emerson, 1986–90, Bowling Green
- F George McPhee, 1978–82, Bowling Green
- F Kip Miller, 1986–90, Michigan State
- D Rob Blake, 1987–90, Bowling Green
- D Wayne Gagné, 1983–87, Western Michigan
- G Ron Scott, 1980–83, Michigan State

==== Second Team ====
- F Dan Dorion, 1982–86, Western Michigan
- F Brian Hills, 1979–83, Bowling Green
- F Paul Pooley, 1981–84, Ohio State
- D Garry Galley, 1981–84, Bowling Green
- D Don McSween, 1983–87, Michigan State
- G Gary Kruzich, 1983–87, Bowling Green

=== 1990s All-Decade Team ===
1990s All-Decade Team

==== First Team ====
- F Jim Dowd, 1987–91, Lake Superior State
- F Brendan Morrison, 1993–97, Michigan
- F Mike York, 1995–99, Michigan State
- D Keith Aldridge, 1992–96, Lake Superior State
- D Mark Astley, 1988–92, Lake Superior State
- G Marty Turco, 1994–98, Michigan

==== Second Team ====
- F Denny Felsner, 1988–92, Michigan
- F Brian Holzinger, 1991–95, Bowling Green
- F Dwayne Norris, 1988–92, Michigan State
- D Dan Boyle, 1994–98, Miami
- D Mike Weaver, 1996–00, Michigan State
- G Darrin Madeley, 1989–92, Lake Superior State

=== 2000-2013 All-Decade Team ===
2000-2013 All-Decade Team

==== First Team ====
- F T. J. Hensick, 2003–07, Michigan
- F Chris Kunitz, 1999–03, Ferris State
- F Kevin Porter, 2004–08, Michigan
- D Andy Greene, 2002–06, Miami
- D John-Michael Liles, 1999–03, Michigan State
- G Ryan Miller, 1999–02, Michigan State

==== Second Team ====
- F Ryan Jones, 2004–08, Miami
- F Andy Miele, 2007–11, Miami
- F Scott Parse, 2003–07, Omaha
- D Brad Fast, 1999–03, Michigan State
- D Greg Zanon, 1999–03, Omaha
- G Cody Reichard, 2008–12, Miami
