= Brian McKee =

Canadian ice hockey player (born 1964)

- Born: December 13, 1964 (age 60); Willowdale, Ontario, Canada
- Height: 5 ft 11 in (180 cm)
- Weight: 185 lb (84 kg; 13 st 3 lb)
- Position: Defence
- Played for: Indianapolis Checkers; Saginaw Hawks; Flint Spirits; Milwaukee Admirals; Fort Wayne Komets; Peoria Rivermen; Phoenix Roadrunners; Houston Aeros
- NHL draft: 1986 NHL Supplemental Draft; Minnesota North Stars
- Playing career: 1987–1995

Brian McKee (born December 13, 1964) is a Canadian former ice hockey defenceman who played nine seasons of professional hockey from 1986 to 1995. He was drafted by the Minnesota North Stars in the 1986 NHL Supplemental Draft.

McKee played predominantly in the International Hockey League where he appeared in 362 regular season games with the Indianapolis Checkers, Saginaw Hawks, Flint Spirits, Milwaukee Admirals, Fort Wayne Komets, Peoria Rivermen, Phoenix Roadrunners, and Houston Aeros.

== Awards and honours ==
Award	Year
All-CCHA Second Team	1985-86
All-CCHA Second Team	1986-87
IHL Governor's Trophy	1990-91
