= Wyatt Smith =

American ice hockey player (born 1977)

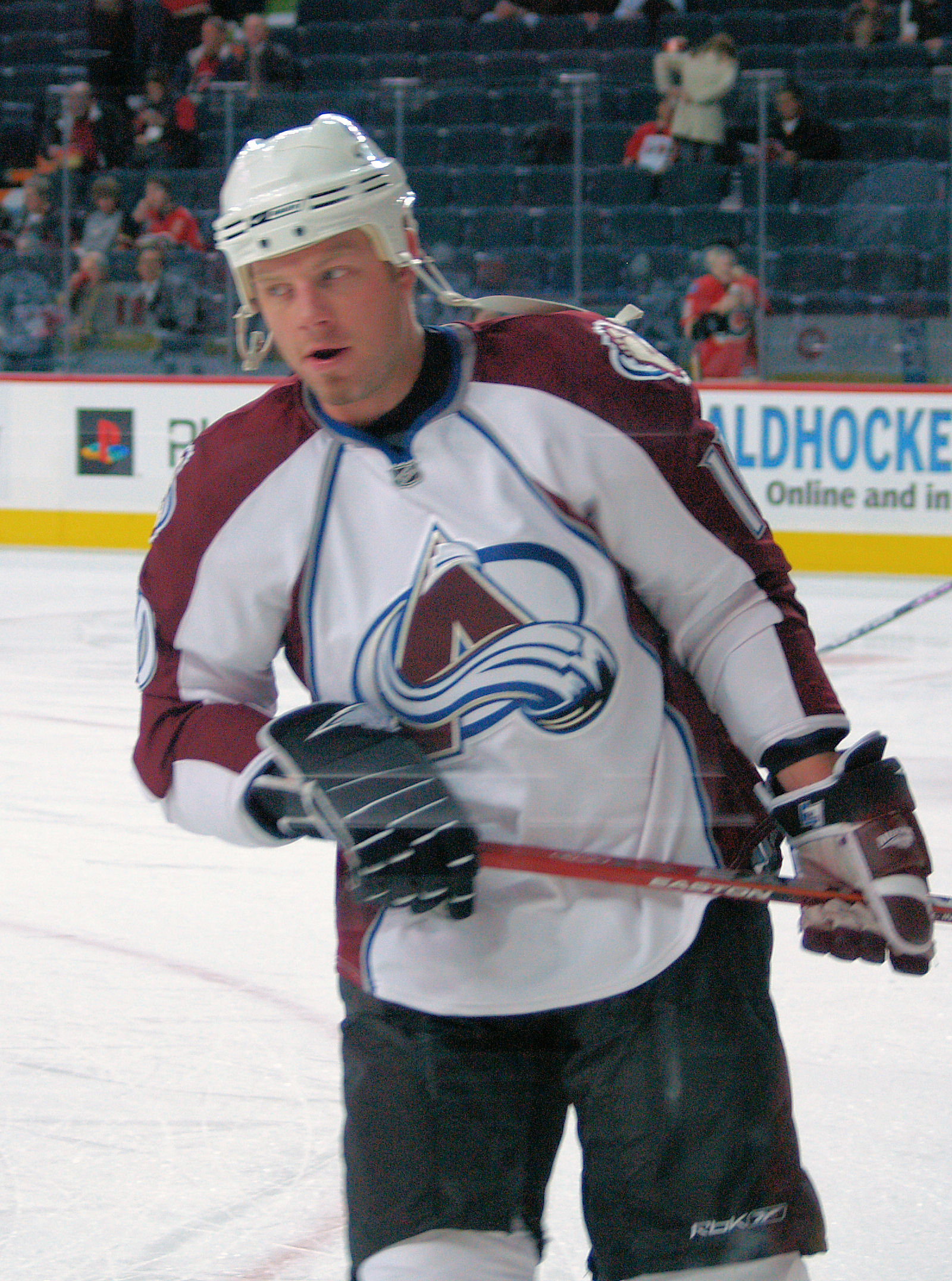
- Smith with the Colorado Avalanche in 2007
- Born: February 13, 1977 (age 49) Thief River Falls, Minnesota, U.S.
- Height: 5 ft 11 in (180 cm)
- Weight: 205 lb (93 kg; 14 st 9 lb)
- Position: Center
- Shot: Left
- Played for: Phoenix Coyotes; Nashville Predators; New York Islanders; Minnesota Wild; Colorado Avalanche; ERC Ingolstadt
- NHL draft: 233rd overall, 1997; Phoenix Coyotes
- Playing career: 1999–2011

Wyatt Carter Smith (born February 13, 1977) is an American former professional ice hockey player who played as a journeyman center in the National Hockey League before finishing his career with ERC Ingolstadt of the Deutsche Eishockey Liga.

== Playing career ==
From 1995 to 1999, he played at the University of Minnesota. In 1997, during his collegiate career, he was drafted by the Phoenix Coyotes in the ninth round with the 233rd overall pick. He has also played on the Nashville Predators, New York Islanders, Minnesota Wild and the Colorado Avalanche.

On July 3, 2008, Smith was signed as a free agent by the Tampa Bay Lightning for the 2008–09 season. After playing 18 games with affiliate, the Norfolk Admirals, Smith was traded by the Lightning back to the team that drafted him the Phoenix Coyotes on November 25, 2008. Smith was then reassigned to the Coyotes' affiliate, the San Antonio Rampage, of the AHL.

On July 31, 2009, Smith was signed to a one-year contract with the Pittsburgh Penguins. Assigned to Pittsburgh's AHL affiliate, Wyatt remained with the Wilkes-Barre/Scranton Penguins as captain for the duration of the 2009–10 season and finished fourth on the team in scoring with 48 points in 76 contests.

On September 2, 2010, Smith signed as a free agent to a one-year contract with the Boston Bruins for the 2010–11 season. Signed to fulfill a veteran presence with the Bruins AHL affiliate in Providence, Smith struggled to produce offensively scoring 2 goals in 30 games. After clearing waivers on December 31, 2010, Smith was released from his contract and signed in Europe for the remainder of the season with German team, ERC Ingolstadt of the DEL.

== Career statistics ==
=== Regular season and playoffs ===
			Regular season					Playoffs
Season	Team	League	GP	G	A	Pts	PIM	GP	G	A	Pts	PIM
1994–95	Warroad High School	HSMN	28	29	31	60	28	—	—	—	—	—
1995–96	University of Minnesota	WCHA	32	4	5	9	32	—	—	—	—	—
1996–97	University of Minnesota	WCHA	38	16	14	30	44	—	—	—	—	—
1997–98	University of Minnesota	WCHA	39	24	23	47	62	—	—	—	—	—
1998–99	University of Minnesota	WCHA	43	23	20	43	37	—	—	—	—	—
1999–2000	Phoenix Coyotes	NHL	2	0	0	0	0	—	—	—	—	—
1999–2000	Springfield Falcons	AHL	60	14	26	40	37	5	2	3	5	13
2000–01	Phoenix Coyotes	NHL	42	3	7	10	13	—	—	—	—	—
2000–01	Springfield Falcons	AHL	18	5	7	12	11	—	—	—	—	—
2001–02	Phoenix Coyotes	NHL	10	0	0	0	0	—	—	—	—	—
2001–02	Springfield Falcons	AHL	69	23	32	55	69	—	—	—	—	—
2002–03	Nashville Predators	NHL	11	1	0	1	0	—	—	—	—	—
2002–03	Milwaukee Admirals	AHL	56	24	27	51	89	4	1	0	1	2
2003–04	Nashville Predators	NHL	18	3	1	4	2	—	—	—	—	—
2003–04	Milwaukee Admirals	AHL	40	9	7	16	40	22	5	7	12	25
2004–05	Milwaukee Admirals	AHL	69	19	28	47	89	7	1	4	5	10
2005–06	New York Islanders	NHL	42	0	8	8	26	—	—	—	—	—
2005–06	Bridgeport Sound Tigers	AHL	39	13	16	29	40	—	—	—	—	—
2006–07	Minnesota Wild	NHL	61	3	3	6	16	4	0	0	0	0
2006–07	Houston Aeros	AHL	12	4	3	7	12	—	—	—	—	—
2007–08	Colorado Avalanche	NHL	25	0	3	3	8	1	0	0	0	0
2007–08	Lake Erie Monsters	AHL	40	17	18	35	34	—	—	—	—	—
2008–09	Norfolk Admirals	AHL	18	3	4	7	12	—	—	—	—	—
2008–09	San Antonio Rampage	AHL	53	16	24	40	59	—	—	—	—	—
2009–10	Wilkes–Barre/Scranton Penguins	AHL	76	13	35	48	70	4	1	0	1	6
2010–11	Providence Bruins	AHL	30	2	7	9	23	—	—	—	—	—
2010–11	ERC Ingolstadt	DEL	22	4	12	16	18	4	1	0	1	2
NHL totals			211	10	22	32	65	5	0	0	0	0
AHL totals			580	162	234	396	585	42	10	14	24	54

=== International ===
Year	Team	Event	GP	G	A	Pts	PIM
1996	United States	WJC	6	0	1	1	2
1997	United States	WJC	6	0	2	2	0
Junior totals			12	0	3	3	2

== Awards and honors ==
Award	Year
College
All-WCHA Third Team	1997–98
All-WCHA Third Team	1998–99
AHL
Calder Cup (Milwaukee Admirals)	2003–04

Awards and achievements
Preceded by David Gove	Captain of the Wilkes-Barre/Scranton Penguins; 2009–10	Succeeded by Ryan Craig
