= David Gove =

American ice hockey player and coach (1978-2017)

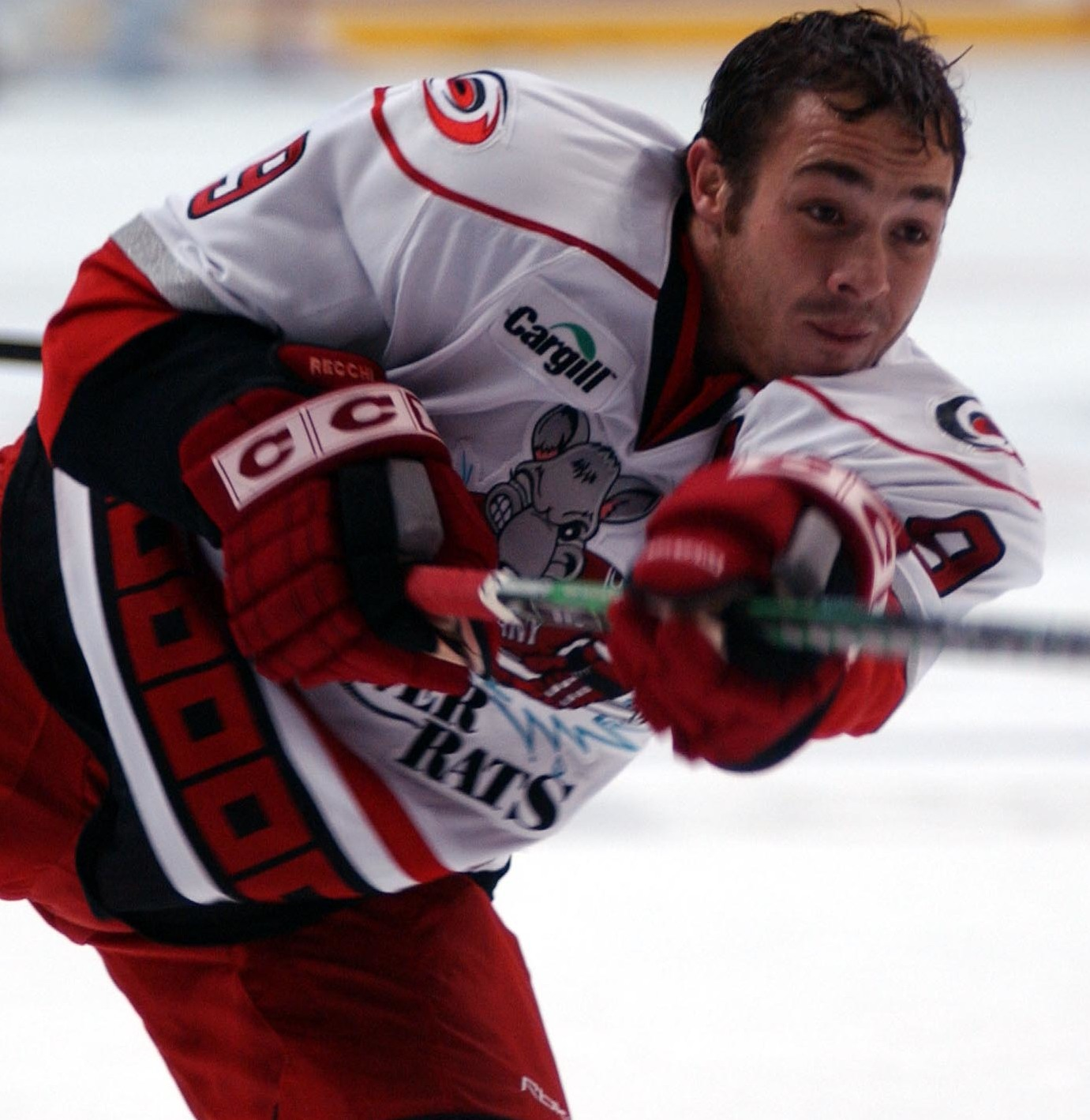
- Gove with the Albany River Rats in 2007
- Born: May 4, 1978 Centerville, Massachusetts, U.S.
- Died: April 5, 2017 (aged 38) Pittsburgh, Pennsylvania, U.S.
- Height: 5 ft 9 in (175 cm)
- Weight: 190 lb (86 kg; 13 st 8 lb)
- Position: Forward
- Shot: Left
- Played for: Carolina Hurricanes
- NHL draft: Undrafted
- Playing career: 2000–2009

David Thomas Gove (May 4, 1978 – April 5, 2017) was an American ice hockey player and head coach of the Wheeling Nailers of the ECHL. He last played with the Wilkes-Barre/Scranton Penguins of the American Hockey League (AHL) during the 2008–09 season. Though he primarily played in the minor leagues, Gove did appear in two games with the Carolina Hurricanes of the National Hockey League (NHL) between 2005 and 2007.

== Career ==
=== Player ===
Gove grew up on Cape Cod in Massachusetts and played youth hockey locally and in the Boston area. As a youth, he played in the 1992 Quebec International Pee-Wee Hockey Tournament with the Boston Bruins minor ice hockey team. He later played college hockey for the Western Michigan University Broncos, where he was a finalist for the Hobey Baker Award for the top player in NCAA men's hockey.

Undrafted, Gove played in two NHL games with the Carolina Hurricanes over his professional career. Gove was recalled by the Hurricanes on January 30, 2006 and recorded an assist in his first NHL game.

Several months later, the Hurricanes won the Stanley Cup. Gove did not meet the qualifications to have his name engraved on the Cup because he did not play in half of the regular season games or make a Cup Final appearance, but he was included in the Stanley Cup team picture and was able to raise the Cup after the Hurricanes' Cup victory due to being a member of the team's "Black Aces" "taxi squad." He was also presented with a Stanley Cup ring by the team.

Gove was recalled a second time by the Carolina Hurricanes on October 21, 2006, as an injury replacement for forward Keith Aucoin. He played one game before being returned to the Hurricanes' American Hockey League (AHL) affiliate in Albany on October 23, 2006. Gove was later recalled several times by the Hurricanes during the 2006–07 NHL season, but was not placed into the Hurricanes' lineup. Gove was later traded to the Pittsburgh Penguins for prospect Joe Jensen on January 31, 2008. Upon announcement of the trade, Gove was assigned to the Penguins' affiliate in Wilkes-Barre and, with the club, reached the 2008 Calder Cup Final. Gove was later named captain of the Wilkes-Barre/Scranton Penguins for the 2008–09 season. Gove retired after the 2008–09 season, playing 522 professional games across five different leagues.

=== Coaching ===
Prior to the 2015–16 ECHL season, Gove was hired as an assistant coach to Clark Donatelli, head coach of the ECHL's Wheeling Nailers. Gove was named the Nailers' interim head coach when Donatelli was promoted to the head coaching position of the Nailers' AHL affiliate the Wilkes-Barre/Scranton Penguins on December 22, 2015. On January 21, 2016, he was made the full-time head coach of the Nailers. However, on April 29 he took a leave of absence for undisclosed reasons from Nailers while the team was in the playoffs. He was replaced as head coach in July 2016 by Nailers' assistant coach Jeff Christian. It was later revealed he went into rehab for drug use, having been abusing painkillers prescribed for the injury that had ended his playing career.

== Death ==
On April 5, 2017, Gove's body was discovered at a rehabilitation facility in Pittsburgh's Uptown neighborhood where he was declared deceased by the local coroner. Several stamp bags of heroin were discovered near Gove's body. Although no official cause of death has been announced, Gove's death is believed to have been caused by a drug overdose.

According to the Boston Globe, Gove became addicted to drugs following his playing-career ending injury. In 2014, Gove reported to police that in his early teens he had been the victim of child sexual abuse by a youth coach Robert G. Richardson, and a prosecution was later brought against Gove's former coach. Years earlier, Gove had told others of the alleged crimes against him. Gove died just prior to the criminal trial, and the prosecution ended.

Gove was survived by a three-year-old son Cullen, his mother Donna, and sisters Kim Burnieika and Kristen Buttrick.

== Career statistics ==
			Regular season					Playoffs
Season	Team	League	GP	G	A	Pts	PIM	GP	G	A	Pts	PIM
1997–98	Western Michigan	CCHA	36	8	7	15	8	—	—	—	—	—
1998–99	Western Michigan	CCHA	33	9	14	23	12	—	—	—	—	—
1999–00	Western Michigan	CCHA	36	18	28	46	22	—	—	—	—	—
2000–01	Western Michigan	CCHA	39	22	37	59	16	—	—	—	—	—
2000–01	Orlando Solar Bears	IHL	9	1	1	2	2	1	0	0	0	0
2001–02	Johnstown Chiefs	ECHL	54	17	32	49	32	8	1	3	4	4
2001–02	Grand Rapids Griffins	AHL	17	2	4	6	8	—	—	—	—	—
2002–03	Laredo Bucks	CHL	8	4	12	16	15	—	—	—	—	—
2002–03	San Antonio Rampage	AHL	72	15	20	35	30	3	0	1	1	0
2003–04	Utah Grizzlies	AHL	75	14	22	36	28	—	—	—	—	—
2004–05	Providence Bruins	AHL	70	13	18	31	30	17	3	3	6	14
2005–06	Lowell Lock Monsters	AHL	65	20	26	46	50	—	—	—	—	—
2005–06	Carolina Hurricanes	NHL	1	0	1	1	0	—	—	—	—	—
2006–07	Albany River Rats	AHL	49	8	13	21	27	4	0	2	2	4
2006–07	Carolina Hurricanes	NHL	1	0	0	0	0	—	—	—	—	—
2007–08	Albany River Rats	AHL	45	8	15	23	31	—	—	—	—	—
2007–08	Wilkes-Barre/Scranton Penguins	AHL	36	15	7	22	10	23	5	7	12	10
2008–09	Wilkes-Barre/Scranton Penguins	AHL	20	3	0	3	8	—	—	—	—	—
AHL totals			449	98	125	223	222	47	8	13	21	28
NHL totals			2	0	1	1	0	—	—	—	—	—

== Awards and honors ==
Award	Year
All-CCHA Second Team	1999–00
All-CCHA Second Team	2000–01

Awards and achievements
Preceded by Nathan Smith	Captain of the Wilkes-Barre/Scranton Penguins; 2008–09	Succeeded by Wyatt Smith
