= Erik Gustafsson (ice hockey, born 1988) =

Swedish ice hockey player (born 1988)

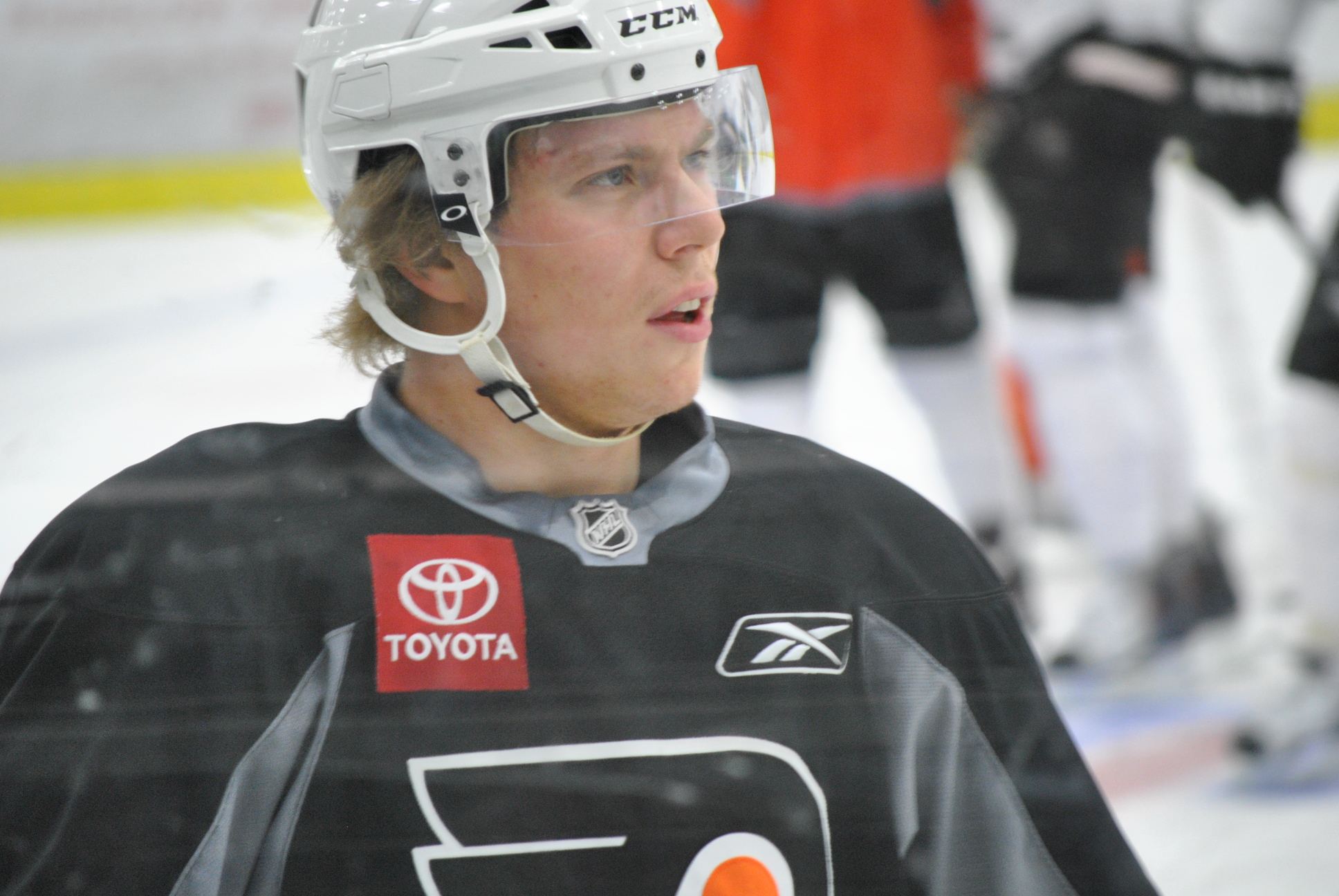
- Gustafsson in 2011
- Born: 15 December 1988 (age 37) Kvissleby, Sweden
- Height: 5 ft 10 in (178 cm)
- Weight: 180 lb (82 kg; 12 st 12 lb)
- Position: Defence
- Shoots: Left
- SHL team Former teams: Luleå HF; Philadelphia Flyers; Avangard Omsk; EHC Kloten; Neftekhimik Nizhnekamsk
- National team: Sweden
- NHL draft: Undrafted
- Playing career: 2010–present

Erik Gustafsson (born 15 December 1988) is a Swedish professional ice hockey defenceman and captain for Luleå HF of the Swedish Hockey League (SHL).

== Playing career ==
Gustafsson played in the youth ranks of Timrå IK before enrolling at Northern Michigan University in 2007. He spent three years in college, before signing a three-year, entry-level contract with the Philadelphia Flyers on 31 March 2010. Gustafsson made his NHL debut on 26 February 2011, against the Ottawa Senators, subbing for Chris Pronger, who was out with a bruised right hand.

Gustafsson scored his first career NHL goal against Ryan Miller of the Buffalo Sabres on 16 February 2012.

Following the 2013–14 NHL season, Gustafsson signed with Avangard Omsk of the Kontinental Hockey League. In the 2014–15 season, Gustafsson immediately established himself amongst the blueline with Omsk, finishing second among defenceman with 22 points in 56 games.

Despite early interest in the off-season from the NHL, on 17 July 2015, Gustafsson left Omsk as a free agent to sign a one-year contract with Swiss club, Kloten Flyers of the NLA. After one year in Switzerland, he returned to Avangard Omsk, signing in May 2016.

On 2 May 2018, Gustafsson returned to his native Sweden in agreeing to a four-year contract with Luleå HF. In making his debut in the SHL in the 2018–19 season, Gustafsson as captain led Luleå HF from the blueline, playing top-pairing minutes in recording 6 goals and 27 points in 49 games. In the playoffs, Gustafsson increased his scoring rate with 9 in 10 games. He was awarded the Salming Trophy as the SHL's best defenceman to conclude the season.

== Career statistics ==
=== Regular season and playoffs ===
			Regular season					Playoffs
Season	Team	League	GP	G	A	Pts	PIM	GP	G	A	Pts	PIM
2004–05	Timrå IK	J18 Allsv	14	4	2	6	12	3	0	0	0	0
2005–06	Timrå IK	J18 Allsv	8	2	1	3	8	—	—	—	—	—
2005–06	Timrå IK	J20	38	3	4	7	26	1	0	0	0	0
2006–07	Timrå IK	J20	41	7	13	20	93	3	0	0	0	14
2007–08	Northern Michigan Wildcats	CCHA	44	0	27	27	12	—	—	—	—	—
2008–09	Northern Michigan Wildcats	CCHA	40	4	30	34	10	—	—	—	—	—
2009–10	Northern Michigan Wildcats	CCHA	39	3	29	32	26	—	—	—	—	—
2009–10	Adirondack Phantoms	AHL	5	2	5	7	0	—	—	—	—	—
2010–11	Adirondack Phantoms	AHL	72	5	44	49	14	—	—	—	—	—
2010–11	Philadelphia Flyers	NHL	3	0	0	0	4	—	—	—	—	—
2011–12	Adirondack Phantoms	AHL	28	1	16	17	14	—	—	—	—	—
2011–12	Philadelphia Flyers	NHL	30	1	4	5	2	7	1	1	2	2
2012–13	Adirondack Phantoms	AHL	39	5	17	22	37	—	—	—	—	—
2012–13	Philadelphia Flyers	NHL	27	3	5	8	2	—	—	—	—	—
2013–14	Philadelphia Flyers	NHL	31	2	8	10	6	2	1	0	1	2
2014–15	Avangard Omsk	KHL	56	6	16	22	18	12	0	3	3	6
2015–16	Kloten Flyers	NLA	48	3	26	29	18	4	0	0	0	2
2016–17	Avangard Omsk	KHL	50	3	16	19	20	12	0	5	5	4
2017–18	Avangard Omsk	KHL	23	1	9	10	6	—	—	—	—	—
2017–18	Neftekhimik Nizhnekamsk	KHL	25	1	12	13	18	2	0	1	1	0
2018–19	Luleå HF	SHL	49	6	21	27	37	10	3	6	9	2
2019–20	Luleå HF	SHL	46	12	20	32	16	—	—	—	—	—
2020–21	Luleå HF	SHL	47	4	28	32	14	7	0	3	3	2
2021–22	Luleå HF	SHL	48	3	23	26	24	17	1	6	7	6
2022–23	Luleå HF	SHL	46	6	15	21	14	10	1	0	1	2
2023–24	Luleå HF	SHL	51	4	11	15	20	7	1	1	2	28
2024–25	Luleå HF	SHL	41	1	19	20	18	17	0	6	6	6
NHL totals			91	6	17	23	14	9	2	1	3	4
KHL totals			154	11	53	64	62	26	0	9	9	10
SHL totals			329	36	137	173	143	68	6	22	28	46

=== International ===
Medal record

Representing Sweden

Ice hockey

World Championships
Gold medal – first place	2013 Sweden/Finland	
Bronze medal – third place	2014 Minsk	

Year	Team	Event	Result	GP	G	A	Pts	PIM
2013	Sweden	WC	1st place, gold medalist(s)	10	1	1	2	2
2014	Sweden	WC	3rd place, bronze medalist(s)	8	0	1	1	6
2016	Sweden	WC	6th	8	0	0	0	4
2018	Sweden	OG	5th	4	0	0	0	2
Senior totals				30	1	2	3	14

== Awards and achievements ==
Award	Year	Ref
College
All-CCHA Rookie Team	2007–08	
All-CCHA First Team	2008–09, 2009–10	
CCHA Best Offensive Defenseman	2008–09, 2009–10	
AHCA West Second-Team All-American	2008–09, 2009–10	
All-CCHA Tournament Team	2010	
AHL
All-Rookie Team	2010–11	
All-Star Game	2011	
KHL
All-Star Game	2015	
SHL
Salming Trophy	2019	
Le Mat Trophy (Luleå HF)	2025	

Awards and achievements
Preceded by Tyler Eckford	CCHA Best Offensive Defenseman; 2008–09, 2009–10	Succeeded by Torey Krug
