= Torey Krug =

American ice hockey player (born 1991)

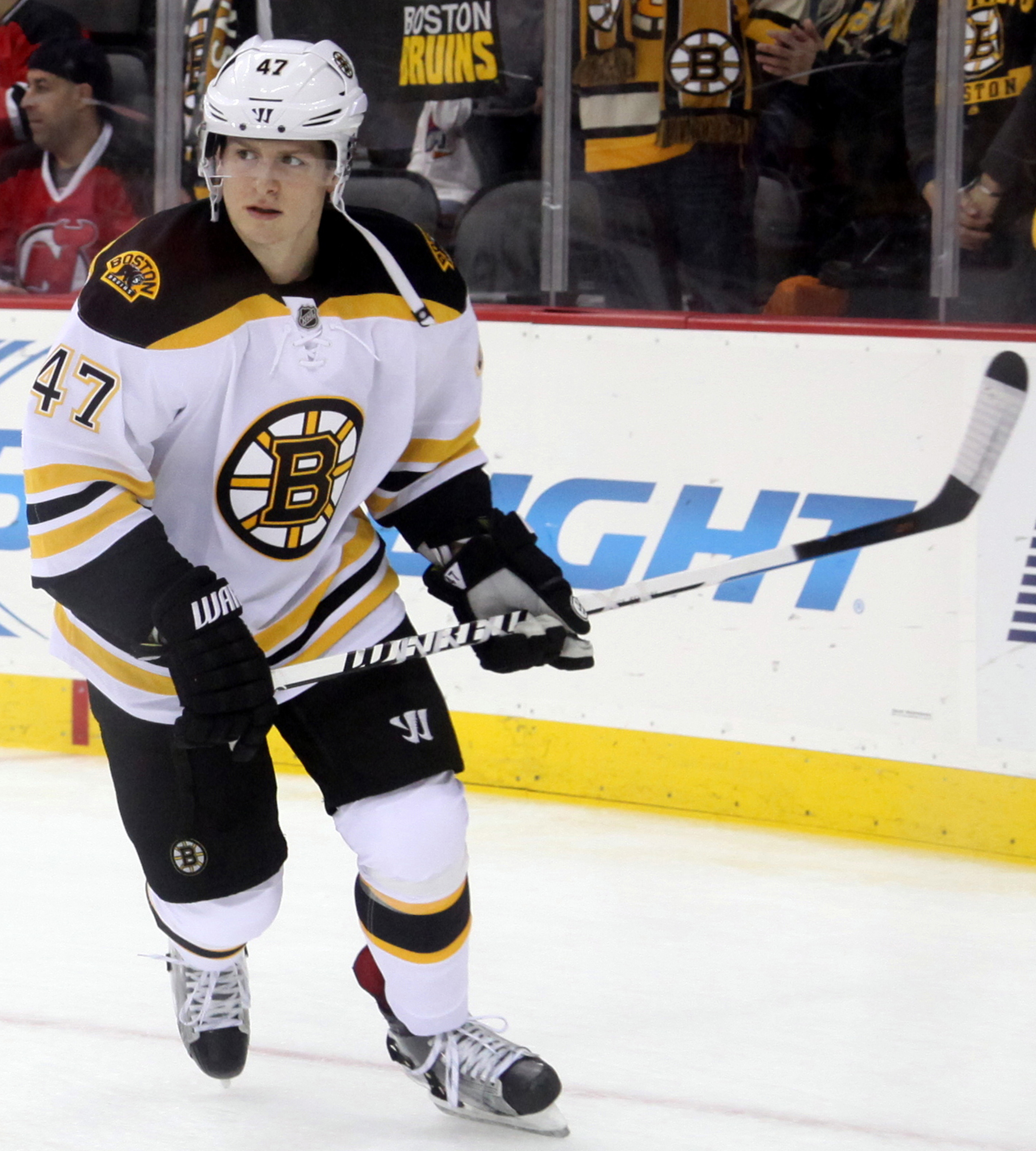
- Krug with the Boston Bruins in 2016
- Born: April 12, 1991 (age 35) Royal Oak, Michigan, U.S.
- Height: 5 ft 9 in (175 cm)
- Weight: 185 lb (84 kg; 13 st 3 lb)
- Position: Defense
- Shot: Left
- Played for: Boston Bruins; St. Louis Blues
- National team: United States
- NHL draft: Undrafted
- Playing career: 2012–2024

Torey Krug (/kruːɡ/ KROOG; born April 12, 1991) is an American former professional ice hockey defenseman under contract with the St. Louis Blues of the National Hockey League (NHL). Krug previously played for the Boston Bruins from 2012 to 2020. He has not played an NHL game since 2024 due to ankle issues.

Being undrafted, he played NCAA hockey at Michigan State University, also playing for the Indiana Ice of the United States Hockey League (USHL), winning the Clark Cup with the latter, the team's first-ever title.

In 2012, Krug was named the CCHA Player of the Year, and was a finalist for the Hobey Baker Award.

== Playing career ==
=== Amateur ===
As a young child, Krug played in the 2003 Quebec International Pee-Wee Hockey Tournament with the Detroit Honeybaked minor ice hockey team. He was hosted by the Avoine family in Québec City during the ten days of the tournament. He later played for the Belle Tire midget program in Michigan, and Krug skated in 59 regular season games for the Indiana Ice of the United States Hockey League (USHL), notching 47 points. Although he was undrafted into the USHL, Krug was extended an invitation by coach Jeff Blashill to try out for the Ice, eventually making the team. Krug also skated in 13 Clark Cup playoff games with seven points before capturing the championship. He was a member of the USHL All-Rookie Team and set the Indiana Ice record for points in a season by a defenseman in 2008–09.

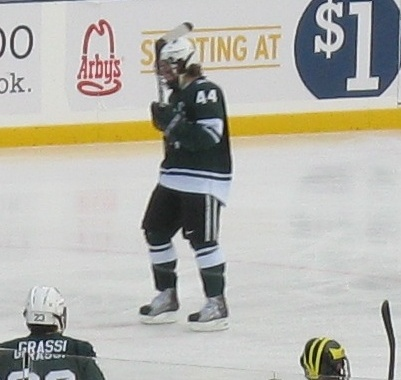
Krug playing with Michigan State in The Big Chill at the Big House

Krug arrived at Michigan State University in the fall of 2009, and was initially slotted as a fifth or sixth defenseman on the roster. During the 2009–10 season, Krug was voted to the CCHA's All-Rookie Team. After skating in all 38 games, he finished the season second on the team in rookie scoring and led all CCHA first-year defensemen in scoring. Krug quickly gained a reputation as one of the CCHA's most offensive performers, and in advance of his sophomore season, was elected captain of the Spartans. As a sophomore, Krug was named to the First Team All-CCHA, and was voted the CCHA's Top Offensive Defenseman (he was the CCHA's top-scoring defenseman that year). In 2011–12, he was named to the All-CCHA Team for the second time, and was named a CCHA Player of the Year and Hobey Baker Award finalist. During the season, Krug was the top scoring defenseman in the CCHA, and shared the CCHA conference scoring title with Notre Dame's T. J. Tynan (29 points), becoming the first defenseman in the league to win a scoring title since Western Michigan's Wayne Gagner in 1986–87.

As the result of his accomplishments with Michigan State, Krug was among collegiate hockey's most sought-after free agents when he signed with the Boston Bruins in 2012.

=== Professional ===
==== Boston Bruins ====
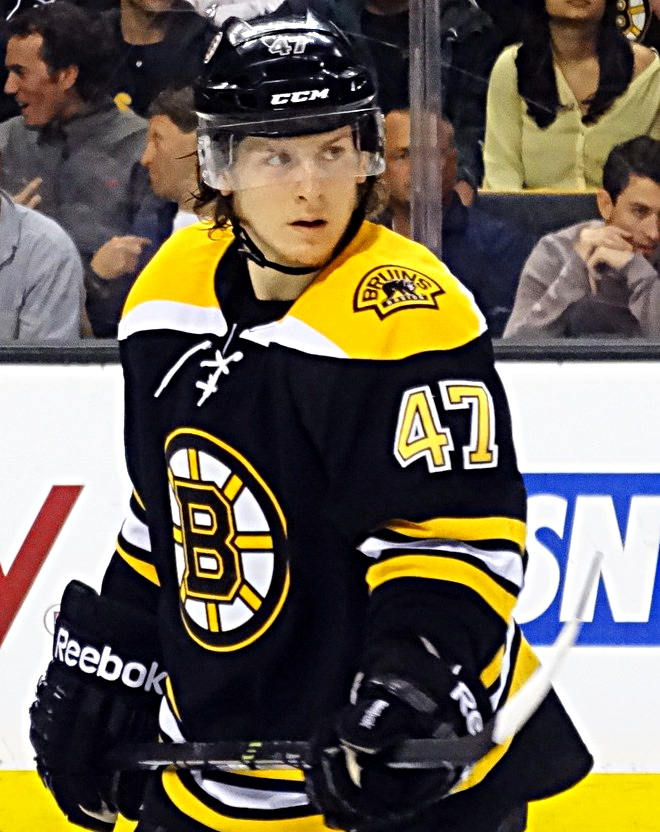
Krug with the Boston Bruins during the 2013 Eastern Conference finals

On March 25, 2012, Krug was signed to an entry-level contract by the Boston Bruins, making his NHL debut on April 3, 2012, against the Pittsburgh Penguins. Appearing in two games with the Bruins, Krug finished with one assist and had an even plus-minus rating, averaging just over 17 minutes of ice time per game.

Krug spent the 2012–13 season with the Providence Bruins, where he was hampered by a sprained ankle until mid-January. After being called up from Providence on an emergency basis, he scored his first NHL goal during his first Stanley Cup playoff game in the Eastern Conference Semi-finals against the New York Rangers, becoming the first Bruins defenseman to score in his playoff debut since Glen Wesley in 1988. Krug followed this by scoring his second NHL goal during Game 2 of the same series, becoming the fourth player in Bruins history to score goals in his first two playoff games. At the conclusion of the series, he became the first rookie defenseman in League history to score four goals in his first five playoff games. In the 2013 postseason, Krug impressed by scoring four goals and recording six assists.

Krug started the 2013–14 season on the Bruins' opening night roster, and scored his first regular season NHL goal on October 5, 2013, against Jimmy Howard of the Detroit Red Wings. On November 25, playing against the Pittsburgh Penguins, he became the first rookie defenseman in Bruins history to score an overtime goal, which also proved to be his first NHL game-winning goal. Krug was frequently mentioned during the 2013–14 season as a strong contender for the Calder Memorial Trophy, awarded to the NHL's rookie of the year. He was named to the NHL's All Rookie Team and was the top scoring rookie defenseman in the league and was 4th in the league in the goals amongst rookies. His 14 goals and 26 assists helped the Bruins win the Presidents' Trophy, with the league's best record. Krug ended the 2014 Stanley Cup playoffs with 10 points in 12 games.

In the 2014–15 Boston Bruins season, Krug tallied 12 goals and 27 assists and recorded a +28 plus-minus, the best of his career. The following season, he produced 44 points on four goals and a career-high 40 assists.

On June 30, 2016, he re-signed a four-year deal worth an AAV of $5.25M with the Bruins. Krug ended the 2016–17 season ranking second among the team in assists and sixth in total points. In late April, Krug underwent surgery to repair a right shoulder injury and was expected to need six months to recover. Krug recovered enough to participate in the 2017 preseason but was injured in his second exhibition game, forcing him to miss the Bruins' season opener.

While playing in the 2018 Stanley Cup playoffs, Krug injured his left ankle during Game 4 against the Tampa Bay Lightning and was later ruled out for the rest of the series. By the time of the pre-season schedule, just before the 2018–19 started on October 3 with a road game against the 2018 Stanley Cup-winning Washington Capitals, Krug suffered a different injury to his left ankle in the last 2018–19 pre-season game against the Philadelphia Flyers, and was expected to be out for a three-week period for recovery and re-evaluation. On March 27, 2019, in a game against the New York Rangers, Krug became the all-time points leader by an American-born player in Boston Bruins history. On June 1, 2019, during game 3 of the 2019 Stanley Cup Finals against the St. Louis Blues, Krug became the first player in Bruins history to record four points in a Stanley Cup Finals game.

==== St. Louis Blues ====
On October 9, 2020, the opening day of free agency, Krug left the Bruins after nine seasons and signed a seven-year, $45.5 million contract with the St. Louis Blues.

On September 3, 2024, it was announced that Krug would miss the entire 2024–25 season due to left ankle surgery.

On May 6, 2025, Blues general manager Doug Armstrong stated that he did not expect Krug to play in the NHL again.

== Personal life ==
Krug was born on April 12, 1991, in Royal Oak, Michigan, the son of Cheryl and Kyle Krug. Torey's brother, Adam, played college hockey at Adrian College and brother Matt played at Robert Morris University and Wayne State University. Another brother, Zak, played college volleyball at Siena Heights University in Adrian, Michigan.

Krug is married to Melanie Krug. They have two daughters together. Krug is a Christian.

Torey admired the play of former Detroit Red Wings forward Pavel Datsyuk because "he's the most well-rounded player on the ice," and models his game after former teammate Zdeno Chára. He calls his father his largest hockey influence.

Krug graduated from Michigan State with a degree in Political Science in May 2017. He originally enrolled within the school's Finance program, but switched majors to Pre-Law after claiming he didn't enjoy the content. Krug was forced to switch programs again after signing with Boston due to the mandatory courses in Law not being available online, leading him towards Political Science. He completed his remaining 38 credits online during the NHL off-season over the course of the next five years.

== Career statistics ==
=== Regular season and playoffs ===
Bold indicates led league

			Regular season					Playoffs
Season	Team	League	GP	G	A	Pts	PIM	GP	G	A	Pts	PIM
2006–07	Belle Tire 16U	T1EHL	31	2	15	17	40	—	—	—	—	—
2007–08	Compuware 18U	T1EHL	25	0	5	5	30	—	—	—	—	—
2008–09	Indiana Ice	USHL	59	10	37	47	50	13	1	6	7	13
2009–10	Michigan State University	CCHA	38	3	18	21	67	—	—	—	—	—
2010–11	Michigan State University	CCHA	38	11	17	28	59	—	—	—	—	—
2011–12	Michigan State University	CCHA	38	12	22	34	51	—	—	—	—	—
2011–12	Boston Bruins	NHL	2	0	1	1	0	—	—	—	—	—
2012–13	Providence Bruins	AHL	63	13	32	45	37	7	0	3	3	2
2012–13	Boston Bruins	NHL	1	0	1	1	0	15	4	2	6	0
2013–14	Boston Bruins	NHL	79	14	26	40	28	12	2	8	10	6
2014–15	Boston Bruins	NHL	78	12	27	39	20	—	—	—	—	—
2015–16	Boston Bruins	NHL	81	4	40	44	33	—	—	—	—	—
2016–17	Boston Bruins	NHL	81	8	43	51	37	—	—	—	—	—
2017–18	Boston Bruins	NHL	76	14	45	59	36	11	3	9	12	8
2018–19	Boston Bruins	NHL	64	6	47	53	33	24	2	**16**	18	10
2019–20	Boston Bruins	NHL	61	9	40	49	33	13	0	6	6	22
2020–21	St. Louis Blues	NHL	51	2	30	32	25	4	0	2	2	2
2021–22	St. Louis Blues	NHL	64	9	34	43	48	3	0	3	3	0
2022–23	St. Louis Blues	NHL	63	7	25	32	49	—	—	—	—	—
2023–24	St. Louis Blues	NHL	77	4	35	39	32	—	—	—	—	—
NHL totals			778	89	394	483	374	82	11	46	57	48

=== International ===
Year	Team	Event	Result	GP	G	A	Pts	PIM
2015	United States	WC	3rd place, bronze medalist(s)	10	2	3	5	8
Senior totals				10	2	3	5	8

== Awards, achievements and records ==
Medal record

Representing United States

Ice hockey

World Championships
Bronze medal – third place	2015 Czech Republic	

Award	Year
College
All-CCHA Rookie Team	2010
All-CCHA First Team	2011, 2012
All-CCHA Best Offensive Defenseman	2011, 2012
CCHA Player of the Year	2012
AHCA West First-Team All-American	2012
NHL
NHL All-Rookie Team	2014
Boston Bruins
Named One of Top 100 Best Bruins Players of all Time	2024

=== Records ===
- First player in the Boston Bruins history to record four points in a Stanley Cup Finals game.

Awards and achievements
Preceded by Erik Gustafsson	CCHA Best Offensive Defenseman; 2010–11; 2011–12	Succeeded by Jacob Trouba
Preceded by Andy Miele	CCHA Player of the Year; 2011–12	Succeeded by Austin Czarnik
