= Mike Buzak =

Canadian ice hockey player

- Born: February 10, 1973 (age 53) Edson, Alberta, Canada
- Height: 6 ft 3 in (191 cm)
- Weight: 210 lb (95 kg; 15 st 0 lb)
- Position: Goaltender
- Caught: Right
- Played for: Worcester IceCats (AHL); Albany River Rats (AHL); Long Beach Ice Dogs (IHL/WCHL); Milwaukee Admirals (IHL); Utah Grizzlies (IHL); Baton Rouge Kingfish (ECHL); Augusta Lynx (ECHL); Tucson Gila Monsters (WCHL); Phoenix Mustangs (WCHL)
- NHL draft: 167th overall, 1993; St. Louis Blues
- Playing career: 1995–2003

Mike Buzak (born February 10, 1973, in Edson, Alberta) is a former professional ice hockey goaltender. He was drafted in the seventh round, 167th overall, of the 1993 NHL entry draft by the St. Louis Blues; however, he never played in the National Hockey League.

After playing collegiately at Michigan State University, Buzak played eight seasons of professional hockey in the International Hockey League, American Hockey League, East Coast Hockey League and West Coast Hockey League. In the 1997-98 season, he shared the James Norris Memorial Trophy (fewest goals allowed for the season) with his Long Beach Ice Dogs (IHL) teammate Kay Whitmore.

== Awards and honours ==
Award	Year
All-CCHA Second Team	1993–94
All-CCHA Second Team	1994–95
CCHA All-Tournament Team	1995
