= Nathan Smith (ice hockey, born 1982) =

Canadian ice hockey player (born 1982)

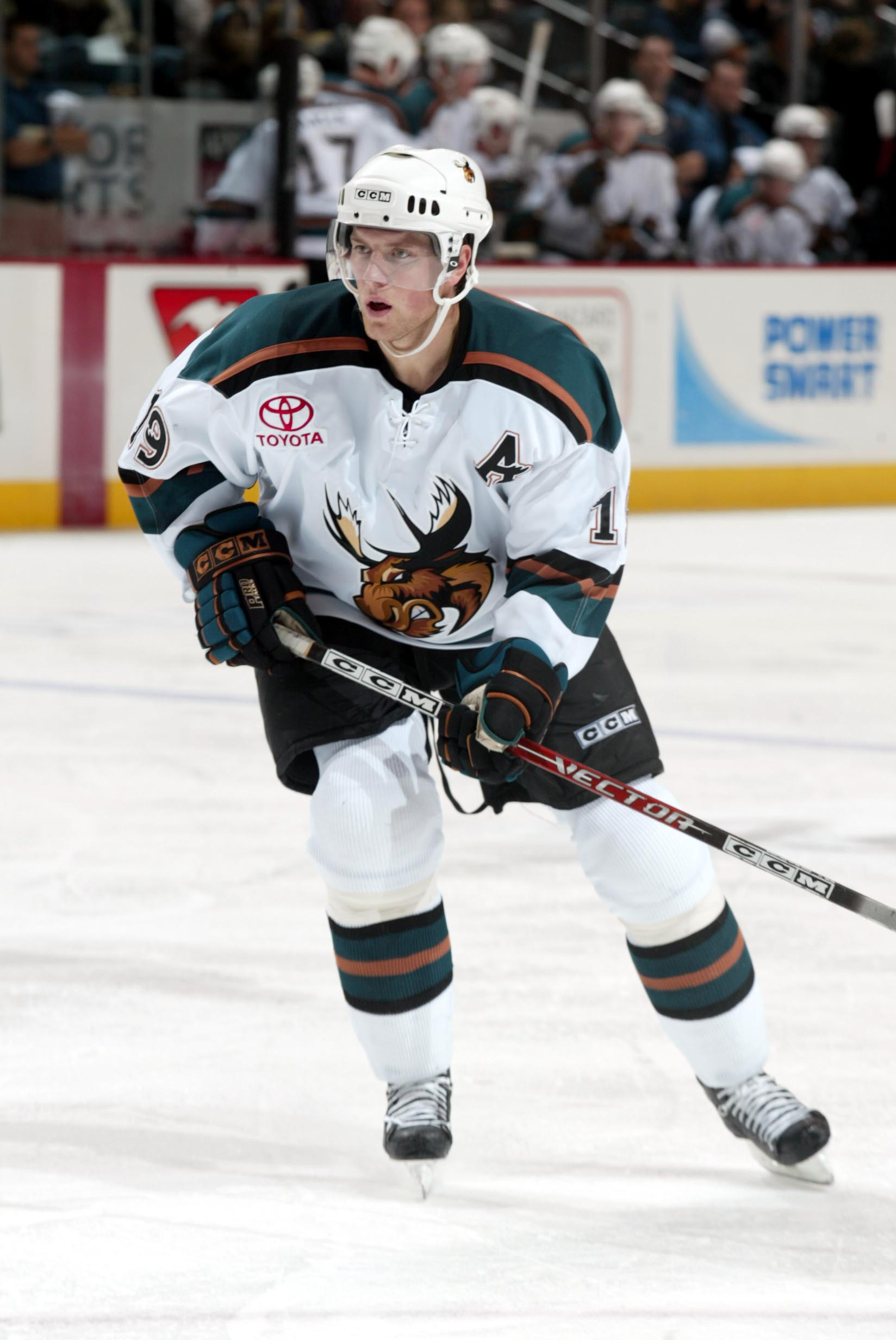
- Smith with the Manitoba Moose in 2006
- Born: February 9, 1982 (age 44) Edmonton, Alberta, Canada
- Height: 6 ft 2 in (188 cm)
- Weight: 190 lb (86 kg; 13 st 8 lb)
- Position: Centre
- Shot: Left
- Played for: Vancouver Canucks; Pittsburgh Penguins; Minnesota Wild; Augsburger Panther
- NHL draft: 23rd overall, 2000; Vancouver Canucks
- Playing career: 2002–2012

Nathan Smith (born February 9, 1982) is a Canadian former professional ice hockey player from Sherwood Park, Alberta. He played in the National Hockey League with the Vancouver Canucks, Pittsburgh Penguins and the Minnesota Wild.

== Playing career ==
Smith was a first-round draft pick, drafted 23rd overall in the 2000 NHL entry draft by the Vancouver Canucks. After spending four seasons with the Swift Current Broncos of the Western Hockey League, Smith signed his first professional contract with the Canucks on May 31, 2002. He made his professional debut in the American Hockey League with the Manitoba Moose in the 2002-03 season. His time spent in the Vancouver organization was filled with injuries, including a near-career-ending knee injury suffered during his 3rd season.

Smith signed as a free agent with the Pittsburgh Penguins on July 12, 2007. On April 27, 2008, Smith played in over 13 games for the Pittsburgh Penguins. He also scored his first NHL goal which was later called off. Smith served as captain for the AHL affiliate team, the Wilkes-Barre/Scranton Penguins, and took his team to the Calder Cup finals, which they lost to the Chicago Wolves in game 5 of the finals.

On July 10, 2008, Smith signed a one-year deal with the Colorado Avalanche. He was assigned to affiliate, the Lake Erie Monsters of the AHL, for the 2008–09 season, and served as captain before suffering a season-ending knee injury on January 23, 2009.

On July 22, 2009, Smith signed a one-year deal with the Minnesota Wild. In the 2009–10 season, Smith made his return to the NHL on October 14, 2009, in a 3-2 defeat to the Anaheim Ducks. He played in 9 games with the Wild throughout the season, but primarily played with its AHL affiliate, the Houston Aeros, scoring 37 points in 67 games.

On August 6, 2010, Smith left North America and signed a one-year contract with German team Augsburger Panther of the DEL where he served as team captain.

Smith returned to the American Hockey League the following season in 2011–12, signing a one-year contract with the Syracuse Crunch on August 11, 2011. Limited to 18 games, Smith suffered a career-ending concussion at the beginning of the season.

== Career statistics ==
			Regular season					Playoffs
Season	Team	League	GP	G	A	Pts	PIM	GP	G	A	Pts	PIM
1998–99	Swift Current Broncos	WHL	47	5	8	13	26	—	—	—	—	—
1999–2000	Swift Current Broncos	WHL	70	21	28	49	72	12	1	6	7	4
2000–01	Swift Current Broncos	WHL	67	28	62	90	78	19	4	3	7	20
2001–02	Swift Current Broncos	WHL	47	22	38	60	52	12	3	6	9	18
2002–03	Manitoba Moose	AHL	53	9	8	17	30	14	1	3	4	25
2003–04	Manitoba Moose	AHL	76	4	16	20	71	—	—	—	—	—
2003–04	Vancouver Canucks	NHL	2	0	0	0	0	—	—	—	—	—
2004–05	Manitoba Moose	AHL	72	7	9	16	67	14	2	4	6	20
2005–06	Manitoba Moose	AHL	20	5	4	9	57	—	—	—	—	—
2005–06	Vancouver Canucks	NHL	1	0	0	0	0	—	—	—	—	—
2006–07	Manitoba Moose	AHL	72	19	21	40	76	6	0	1	1	12
2006–07	Vancouver Canucks	NHL	1	0	0	0	0	4	0	0	0	0
2007–08	Wilkes–Barre/Scranton Penguins	AHL	68	22	28	50	61	22	7	11	18	40
2007–08	Pittsburgh Penguins	NHL	13	0	0	0	2	—	—	—	—	—
2008–09	Lake Erie Monsters	AHL	44	6	10	16	42	—	—	—	—	—
2009–10	Houston Aeros	AHL	67	14	23	37	83	—	—	—	—	—
2009–10	Minnesota Wild	NHL	9	0	0	0	12	—	—	—	—	—
2010–11	Augsburger Panther	DEL	52	4	12	16	42	—	—	—	—	—
2011–12	Syracuse Crunch	AHL	18	1	5	6	4	—	—	—	—	—
AHL totals			490	87	124	211	491	56	10	19	29	97
NHL totals			26	0	0	0	14	4	0	0	0	0

Awards and achievements
Preceded by Henrik Sedin	Vancouver Canucks first round pick 2000	Succeeded by R. J. Umberger
Preceded by Micki DuPont	Captain of the Wilkes-Barre/Scranton Penguins; 2007-08	Succeeded by David Gove
