= Paul Ysebaert =

Canadian ice hockey player

- Born: May 15, 1966 (age 60) Sarnia, Ontario, Canada
- Height: 6 ft 1 in (185 cm)
- Weight: 190 lb (86 kg; 13 st 8 lb)
- Position: Centre
- Shot: Left
- Played for: New Jersey Devils; Detroit Red Wings; Chicago Blackhawks; Winnipeg Jets; Tampa Bay Lightning; SC Rapperswil-Jona
- National team: Canada
- NHL draft: 74th overall, 1984; New Jersey Devils
- Playing career: 1987–1999

Paul Robert Ysebaert (born May 15, 1966) is a Canadian former professional ice hockey player. During his fourteen years playing career, he played 11 years in the National Hockey League as a left wing for the New Jersey Devils, Detroit Red Wings, Winnipeg Jets, Chicago Blackhawks, and Tampa Bay Lightning. Ysebaert accumulated a total of 336 points in 532 games during his career.

== Playing career ==
Ysebaert was one of the more popular players in Detroit during the early 1990s after arriving in a trade from the New Jersey Devils. Earning the nickname "Rocket Man" from the fans, he enjoyed his best season in 1991–92, with 35 goals and 40 assists. The same year he became the first Red Wing to win the NHL Plus-Minus Award. Ysebaert was dealt to the Winnipeg Jets before the 1993–94 season for former University of Michigan defenceman Aaron Ward. Ysebaert served as the first captain of the Tampa Bay Lightning, from 1995 to 1997. After one season in Europe, Ysebaert retired in 2000, citing injuries.

== Career statistics ==
			Regular season					Playoffs
Season	Team	League	GP	G	A	Pts	PIM	GP	G	A	Pts	PIM
1982–83	Petrolia Jets	WOHL	40	23	30	53	24	—	—	—	—	—
1982–83	Newmarket Flyers	OJHL	2	0	0	0	19	—	—	—	—	—
1983–84	Petrolia Jets	WOHL	33	35	42	77	18	—	—	—	—	—
1984–85	Bowling Green Falcons	CCHA	42	23	32	55	54	—	—	—	—	—
1985–86	Bowling Green Falcons	CCHA	42	23	45	68	50	—	—	—	—	—
1986–87	Bowling Green Falcons	CCHA	42	27	58	85	44	—	—	—	—	—
1986–87	Canada	Intl	5	1	0	1	4	—	—	—	—	—
1987–88	Utica Devils	AHL	78	30	49	79	60	—	—	—	—	—
1988–89	Utica Devils	AHL	56	36	44	80	22	5	0	1	1	4
1988–89	New Jersey Devils	NHL	5	0	4	4	0	—	—	—	—	—
1989–90	Utica Devils	AHL	74	53	52	105	61	5	2	4	6	0
1989–90	New Jersey Devils	NHL	5	1	2	3	0	—	—	—	—	—
1990–91	New Jersey Devils	NHL	11	4	3	7	6	—	—	—	—	—
1990–91	Detroit Red Wings	NHL	51	15	18	33	16	2	0	2	2	0
1991–92	Detroit Red Wings	NHL	79	35	40	75	55	10	1	0	1	10
1992–93	Detroit Red Wings	NHL	80	34	28	62	42	7	3	1	4	2
1993–94	Winnipeg Jets	NHL	60	9	18	27	18	—	—	—	—	—
1993–94	Chicago Blackhawks	NHL	11	5	3	8	8	6	0	0	0	8
1994–95	Chicago Blackhawks	NHL	15	4	5	9	6	—	—	—	—	—
1994–95	Tampa Bay Lightning	NHL	29	8	11	19	12	—	—	—	—	—
1995–96	Tampa Bay Lightning	NHL	55	16	15	31	16	5	0	0	0	0
1996–97	Tampa Bay Lightning	NHL	39	5	12	17	4	—	—	—	—	—
1997–98	Tampa Bay Lightning	NHL	82	13	27	40	32	—	—	—	—	—
1998–99	Cleveland Lumberjacks	IHL	27	6	11	17	14	—	—	—	—	—
1998–99	Tampa Bay Lightning	NHL	10	0	1	1	2	—	—	—	—	—
1999–00	SC Rapperswil–Jona	NLA	32	14	11	25	49	—	—	—	—	—
NHL totals			532	149	187	336	217	30	4	3	7	20

== Awards and honours ==
Award	Year
All-CCHA Second Team	1985–86
All-CCHA Second Team	1986–87
CCHA All-Tournament Team	1987
AHL Les Cunningham Award	1989–90
AHL John B. Sollenberger Trophy	1989–90
NHL Plus-Minus Award	1991–92

Awards and achievements
Preceded by Gary Emmons; Bill Shibicky	CCHA Rookie of the Year; 1984–85	Succeeded by Joe Murphy
Preceded by Position created, no captain 1992–95	Tampa Bay Lightning captain 1995–97	Succeeded by Mikael Renberg
Preceded by Marty McSorley and Theoren Fleury	Winner of the NHL Plus-Minus Award; 1992	Succeeded by Mario Lemieux
