= 1986 NHL supplemental draft =

Player selection draft

General information
- Date(s): September 17, 1986

Overview
- 23 total selections in 2 rounds
- First selection: (United States) Bob Kudelski (Los Angeles Kings)

The 1986 NHL supplemental draft was the first NHL supplemental draft. It was held on September 17, 1986.

== Selections by round ==
= NHL All-Star (Note: Players are identified as an All-Star if they were selected for the All-Star game at any time in their career.) ·

=== Round one ===
The first round was limited to teams that missed the 1986 Stanley Cup playoffs.

Pick #	Player	Nationality	NHL team	College (league)
— (Note: Invalid claim. Kidd entered school after age 20 and therefore did not meet eligibility requirements.)	Ian Kidd (D)	United States	Detroit Red Wings	University of North Dakota (WCHA)
1	Bob Kudelski (C)	United States	Los Angeles Kings	Yale University (ECAC)
2	Glen Engevik (RW)	Canada	New Jersey Devils	University of Denver (WCHA)
3	Jeff Lamb (F)	United States	Pittsburgh Penguins	University of Denver (WCHA)
4	Jeff Capello (LW)	Canada	Buffalo Sabres	University of Vermont (Hockey East)

=== Round two ===
Pick #	Player	Nationality	NHL team	College (league)
5	Rob Doyle (D)	Canada	Detroit Red Wings	Colorado College (WCHA)
— (Note: Invalid claim. Paranica entered school after age 20 and therefore did not meet eligibility requirements.)	Grant Paranica (RW)	Canada	Los Angeles Kings	University of North Dakota (WCHA)
6	Tim Barakett (F)	United States	New Jersey Devils	Harvard University (ECAC)
7	Randy Taylor (D)	Canada	Pittsburgh Penguins	Harvard University (ECAC)
8	John Cullen (C)	Canada	Buffalo Sabres	Boston University (Hockey East)
9	Art Fitzgerald (G)	United States	Toronto Maple Leafs	Trinity College (ECAC North/South)
10	David Gourlie (D)	Canada	Vancouver Canucks	University of Denver (WCHA)
11	Chris Levasseur (F)	United States	Winnipeg Jets	University of Alaska Anchorage (GWHC)
12	Gary Emmons (C)	Canada	New York Rangers	Northern Michigan University (WCHA)
13	Marty Raus (D)	United States	St. Louis Blues	Northeastern University (Hockey East)
14	Joe Tracy (RW)	United States	Hartford Whalers	Ohio State University (CCHA)
15	Brian McKee (D)	Canada	Minnesota North Stars	Bowling Green State University (CCHA)
16	Chris Olson (G)	United States	Boston Bruins	University of Denver (WCHA)
17	Dave Randall (D)	Canada	Chicago Blackhawks	Northern Michigan University (WCHA)
18	Randy Exelby (G)	Canada	Montreal Canadiens	Lake Superior State University (CCHA)
19	Steve MacSwain (RW)	United States	Calgary Flames	University of Minnesota (WCHA)
20	Gary Kruzich (G)	United States	New York Islanders	Bowling Green State University (CCHA)
21	Mike Natyshak (F)	Canada	Quebec Nordiques	Bowling Green State University (CCHA)
22	Steve Cousins (D)	Canada	Washington Capitals	University of Alberta (CIAU)
—	Declined selection		Philadelphia Flyers	
23	Peter Heinze (D)	United States	Edmonton Oilers	University of Massachusetts Lowell (Hockey East)

== See also ==
- 1986 NHL entry draft
- 1986–87 NHL season
- List of NHL players
