= Nathan Oystrick =

Canadian ice hockey player (born 1982)

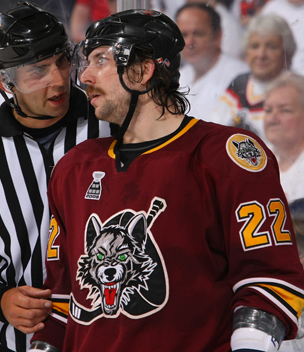
- Oystrick playing for the Chicago Wolves in 2008
- Born: December 17, 1982 (age 43) Regina, Saskatchewan, Canada
- Height: 5 ft 11 in (180 cm)
- Weight: 221 lb (100 kg; 15 st 11 lb)
- Position: Defence
- Shot: Left
- Played for: Atlanta Thrashers; Anaheim Ducks; St. Louis Blues; Lev Praha
- NHL draft: 198th overall, 2002; Atlanta Thrashers
- Playing career: 2006–2016

Nathan Oystrick (born December 17, 1982) is a Canadian former professional ice hockey defenceman. Oystrick has previously played in the National Hockey League (NHL) with the Atlanta Thrashers, Anaheim Ducks and St. Louis Blues. He was originally drafted by the Thrashers in the seventh round, 198th overall, at the 2002 NHL entry draft. Oystrick was named head coach of the Humboldt Broncos on July 3, 2018, but quit the position less than six months later without explanation.

== Playing career ==
Oystrick was drafted 198th overall in the 2002 NHL entry draft by the Atlanta Thrashers. On March 1, 2010, Oystrick, along with a conditional pick, was traded to the Anaheim Ducks in exchange for forward Evgeny Artyukhin. Oystrick played in three games with the Ducks to end the 2009–10 season before he was bought-out from the remainder of his contract on June 30, 2010.

On July 11, 2010, as a free agent, Oystrick signed a one-year contract with the St. Louis Blues. Oystrick began the 2010–11 season with the Blues' American Hockey League (AHL) affiliate, the Peoria Rivermen, but on November 3, the Blues recalled him from Peoria.

Oystrick signed a one-year contract as a free agent with the Phoenix Coyotes on July 6, 2011. In the 2011–12 season, Oysrick failed to make the Coyotes out of training camp and was reassigned to the team's affiliate, the Portland Pirates, for the duration of the year, scoring 43 points in 60 games.

On June 2, 2012, Oystrick signed a one-year contract with Kontinental Hockey League (KHL) side Lev Praha.

On November 13, 2014, Oystrick returned to North America, signing a professional try-out contract with the Springfield Falcons of the AHL in the 2014–15 season. With an eye to his post-playing career, in the following season, Oystrick signed a one-year contract in a playing and assistant coach role with the Elmira Jackals of the ECHL, an affiliate of the Buffalo Sabres on July 9, 2015.

== Coaching career ==
During the 2015-16 off-season, Oystrick opted to end his professional playing career after 10 seasons, agreeing to an assistant coaching role with the Atlanta Gladiators on July 30, 2016.

On July 3, 2018, Oystrick was named the head coach of the Humboldt Broncos of the SJHL, replacing Darcy Haugan who was one of 16 people killed in the Humboldt Broncos bus crash.

On December 28, 2018, Oystrick announced his resignation from the post of GM and coach. No reason was given, although a formal statement was expected to follow.

After leaving Humboldt, Oystrick went back to coaching in Colorado for the Colorado Academy Mustangs.

He coached for the Wausau Cyclones (NA3HL) for four seasons — being named NA3HL Coach of the Year in 2023-24 after leading the Cyclones to a 36-10-0-1 record that year.

Currently, Oystrick was named the Head Coach of the NAHL Houston Bulls ahead of their inaugural season (2026-27) following the team's relocation from North Iowa.

== Career statistics ==
			Regular season					Playoffs
Season	Team	League	GP	G	A	Pts	PIM	GP	G	A	Pts	PIM
1998–99	Regina Pat Canadians AAA	SMHL	43	6	22	28	214	—	—	—	—	—
1999–2000	Regina Pat Canadians AAA	SMHL	29	9	19	28	180	—	—	—	—	—
1999–2000	Notre Dame Hounds	SJHL	17	0	0	0	57	1	0	0	0	0
2000–01	South Surrey Eagles	BCHL	60	9	35	44	224	8	0	3	3	8
2001–02	South Surrey Eagles	BCHL	50	15	42	57	148	—	—	—	—	—
2002–03	Northern Michigan University	CCHA	34	2	10	12	26	—	—	—	—	—
2003–04	Northern Michigan University	CCHA	39	8	20	28	98	—	—	—	—	—
2004–05	Northern Michigan University	CCHA	40	7	13	20	87	—	—	—	—	—
2005–06	Northern Michigan University	CCHA	38	9	20	29	58	—	—	—	—	—
2005–06	Chicago Wolves	AHL	2	0	1	1	4	—	—	—	—	—
2006–07	Chicago Wolves	AHL	80	15	32	47	105	15	0	6	6	16
2007–08	Chicago Wolves	AHL	80	15	28	43	112	24	3	8	11	35
2008–09	Atlanta Thrashers	NHL	53	4	8	12	50	—	—	—	—	—
2009–10	Chicago Wolves	AHL	43	7	16	23	96	14	2	8	10	8
2009–10	Anaheim Ducks	NHL	3	0	0	0	2	—	—	—	—	—
2010–11	Peoria Rivermen	AHL	61	15	30	45	125	4	1	1	2	7
2010–11	St. Louis Blues	NHL	9	1	2	3	9	—	—	—	—	—
2011–12	Portland Pirates	AHL	60	11	32	43	107	—	—	—	—	—
2012–13	Lev Praha	KHL	43	3	6	9	42	4	0	3	3	2
2013–14	Lev Praha	KHL	43	2	14	16	36	22	4	7	11	10
2014–15	Springfield Falcons	AHL	12	1	3	4	4	—	—	—	—	—
2015–16	Elmira Jackals	ECHL	48	3	15	18	33	—	—	—	—	—
AHL totals			338	64	142	206	553	57	6	23	29	66
NHL totals			65	5	10	15	61	—	—	—	—	—
KHL totals			86	5	20	25	78	26	4	10	14	12

== Awards and achievements ==
Award	Year
College
All-CCHA Second Team	2004
All-CCHA First Team	2005
CCHA Best Defensive Defenseman	2005
AHCA West Second-Team All-American	2006
AHL
All Rookie Team	2007
Second All-Star Team	2007

Awards and achievements
Preceded by Doug Andress	CCHA Best Defensive Defenseman; 2004–05	Succeeded by Andy Greene
