= Tyler Eckford =

Canadian ice hockey player (born 1985)

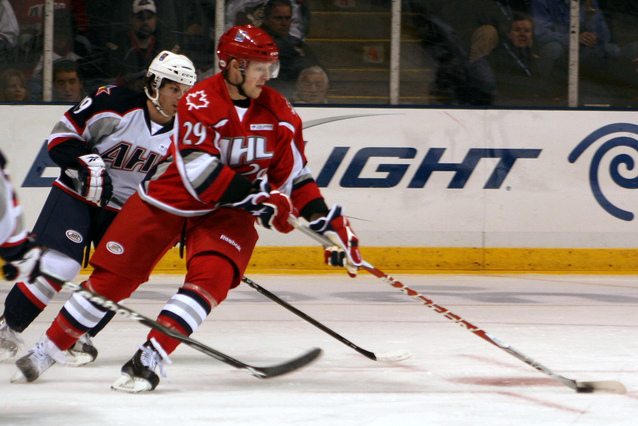
- Born: September 8, 1985 (age 40) Vancouver, British Columbia, Canada
- Height: 6 ft 1 in (185 cm)
- Weight: 200 lb (91 kg; 14 st 4 lb)
- Position: Defence
- Shot: Left
- Played for: New Jersey Devils
- NHL draft: 217th overall, 2004; New Jersey Devils
- Playing career: 2003–2014

Tyler Eckford (born September 8, 1985) is a Canadian former professional ice hockey player. Eckford played for the New Jersey Devils organization of the National Hockey League (NHL).

== Playing career ==
As a youth, Eckford played in the 1999 Quebec International Pee-Wee Hockey Tournament with a minor ice hockey team from Langley, British Columbia.

Eckford was drafted by the Devils in the seventh round of the 2004 NHL entry draft. Eckford joined the University of Alaska, graduating in 2008. During his junior year at the University of Alaska, Eckford was named to the CCHA All-Conference First Team.

Following university, Eckford joined the Lowell Devils, the American Hockey League (AHL) affiliate of New Jersey. Eckford played three seasons with Lowell, and earned two call-ups to New Jersey. He made his NHL debut on November 20, 2009, in a shootout loss to the Nashville Predators. He recorded his first NHL point the following day against the Dallas Stars in a 5-3 loss. He was reassigned back to the AHL a few games later. On January 15, 2010, Eckford was named to the 2010 AHL All-Star Classic.

After the 2010–11 season, Eckford signed a one-year, two-way contract with the Phoenix Coyotes as a free agent. Eckford played the 2011–12 season with the Portland Pirates, the Coyotes' AHL affiliate.

On July 10, 2012, Eckford signed a two-year, two-way contract with the Ottawa Senators as a free agent.

== Career statistics ==
			Regular season					Playoffs
Season	Team	League	GP	G	A	Pts	PIM	GP	G	A	Pts	PIM
2001–02	Queen's Park Pirates	PIJHL	38	21	32	53	52	—	—	—	—	—
2001–02	South Surrey Eagles	BCHL	10	0	0	0	0	—	—	—	—	—
2003–04	Surrey Eagles	BCHL	58	7	30	37	101	13	2	8	10	34
2004–05	Surrey Eagles	BCHL	60	22	43	65	93	25	4	15	19	46
2005–06	University of Alaska Fairbanks	CCHA	38	3	15	18	43	—	—	—	—	—
2006–07	University of Alaska Fairbanks	CCHA	39	5	17	22	54	—	—	—	—	—
2007–08	University of Alaska Fairbanks	CCHA	35	8	23	31	55	—	—	—	—	—
2008–09	Lowell Devils	AHL	72	2	25	27	59	—	—	—	—	—
2009–10	Lowell Devils	AHL	61	8	23	31	26	5	1	0	1	2
2009–10	New Jersey Devils	NHL	3	0	1	1	4	—	—	—	—	—
2010–11	Albany Devils	AHL	37	2	10	12	12	—	—	—	—	—
2010–11	New Jersey Devils	NHL	4	0	0	0	0	—	—	—	—	—
2011–12	Portland Pirates	AHL	75	10	15	25	37	—	—	—	—	—
2012–13	Binghamton Senators	AHL	59	7	6	13	49	2	0	0	0	0
2013–14	Binghamton Senators	AHL	32	0	4	4	15	—	—	—	—	—
AHL totals			336	29	83	112	198	7	1	0	1	2
NHL totals			7	0	1	1	4	—	—	—	—	—

== Awards and honours ==
Award	Year
All-CCHA Rookie Team	2005-06
All-CCHA First Team	2007–08
AHCA West First-Team All-American	2007–08

Awards and achievements
Preceded by Jack Johnson	CCHA Best Offensive Defenseman; 2007-08	Succeeded by Erik Gustafsson
