= Greg Zanon =

Canadian ice hockey player

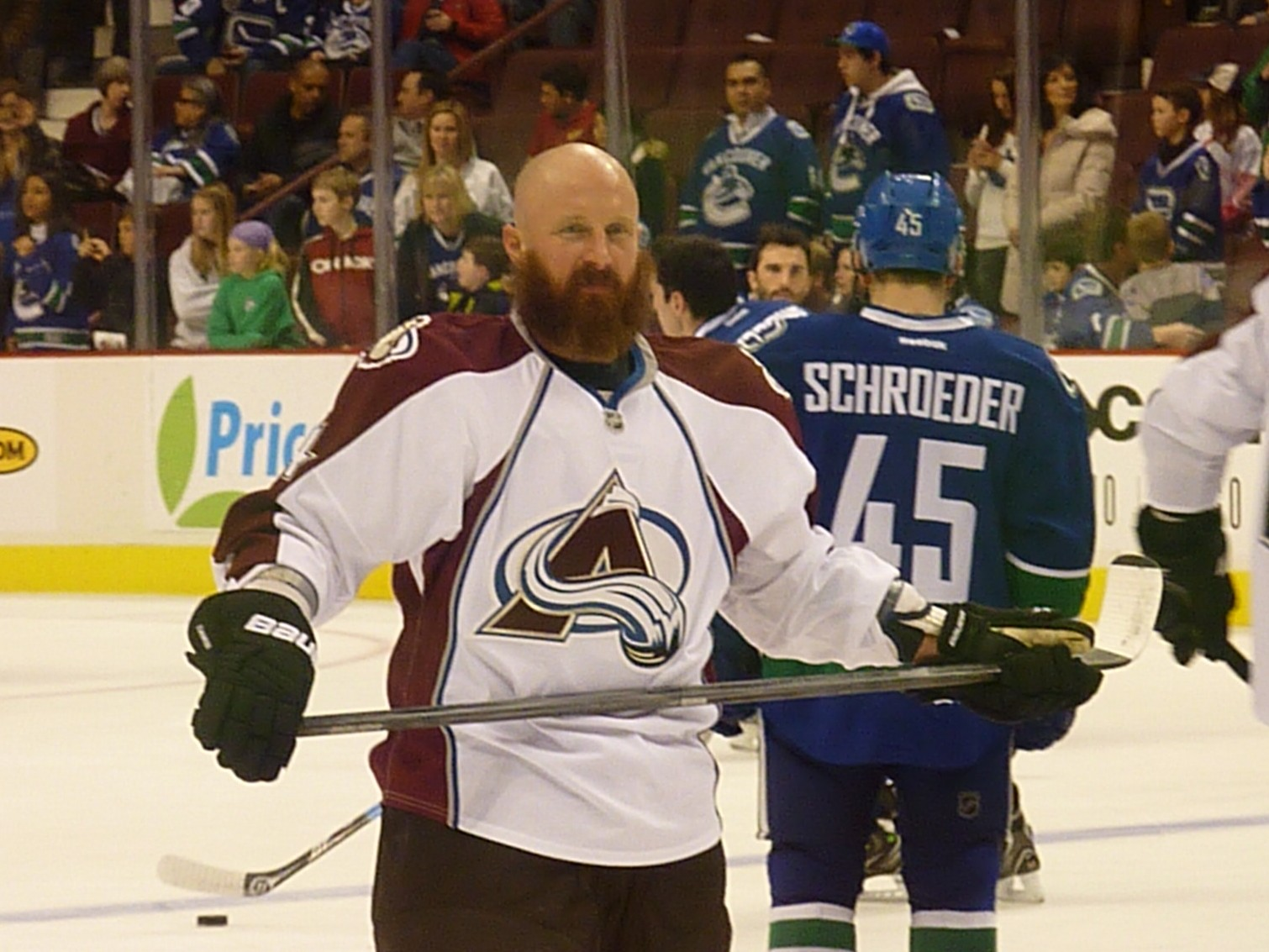
- Zanon with the Colorado Avalanche in 2013
- Born: June 5, 1980 (age 46) Burnaby, British Columbia, Canada
- Height: 5 ft 11 in (180 cm)
- Weight: 211 lb (96 kg; 15 st 1 lb)
- Position: Defence
- Shot: Left
- Played for: Nashville Predators; Minnesota Wild; Boston Bruins; Colorado Avalanche
- NHL draft: 156th overall, 2000; Ottawa Senators
- Playing career: 2003–2015

Gregory M. Zanon (born June 5, 1980) is a Canadian former professional ice hockey defenceman who played almost 500 games in the National Hockey League (NHL). Current head coach of the Stillwater Boys Varsity Hockey team in Minnesota.

== Playing career ==
Zanon played four seasons, from 1999 to 2003, for the University of Nebraska at Omaha in the CCHA and was named to the CCHA First All-Star Team in 2001. Zanon was drafted by the Ottawa Senators of the National Hockey League (NHL) in the fifth round, 156th overall, in the 2000 NHL entry draft.

Unsigned by the Senators, Zanon played three seasons for the Milwaukee Admirals of the American Hockey League (AHL), an affiliate of the Nashville Predators. It was not until the 2005–06 season that he finally broke into the NHL, when he played four games for the Predators. Zanon rose in the NHL as a top player in the blocked shots statistic. He had 189 blocked shots in the 2007–08 NHL season.

On July 1, 2009, Zanon signed a three-year deal with the Minnesota Wild. His first season with the Wild in 2009–10 was largely successful, while proving a reliable physical force he also registered a career high 13 assists and 15 points in 81 games.

In the last year of his contract with the Wild in the 2011–12 season, Zanon fell out of favour and was relegated as a healthy scratch in seven games. He appeared in only 39 contests before he was dealt at the trade deadline to the Boston Bruins for Steven Kampfer, on February 27, 2012.

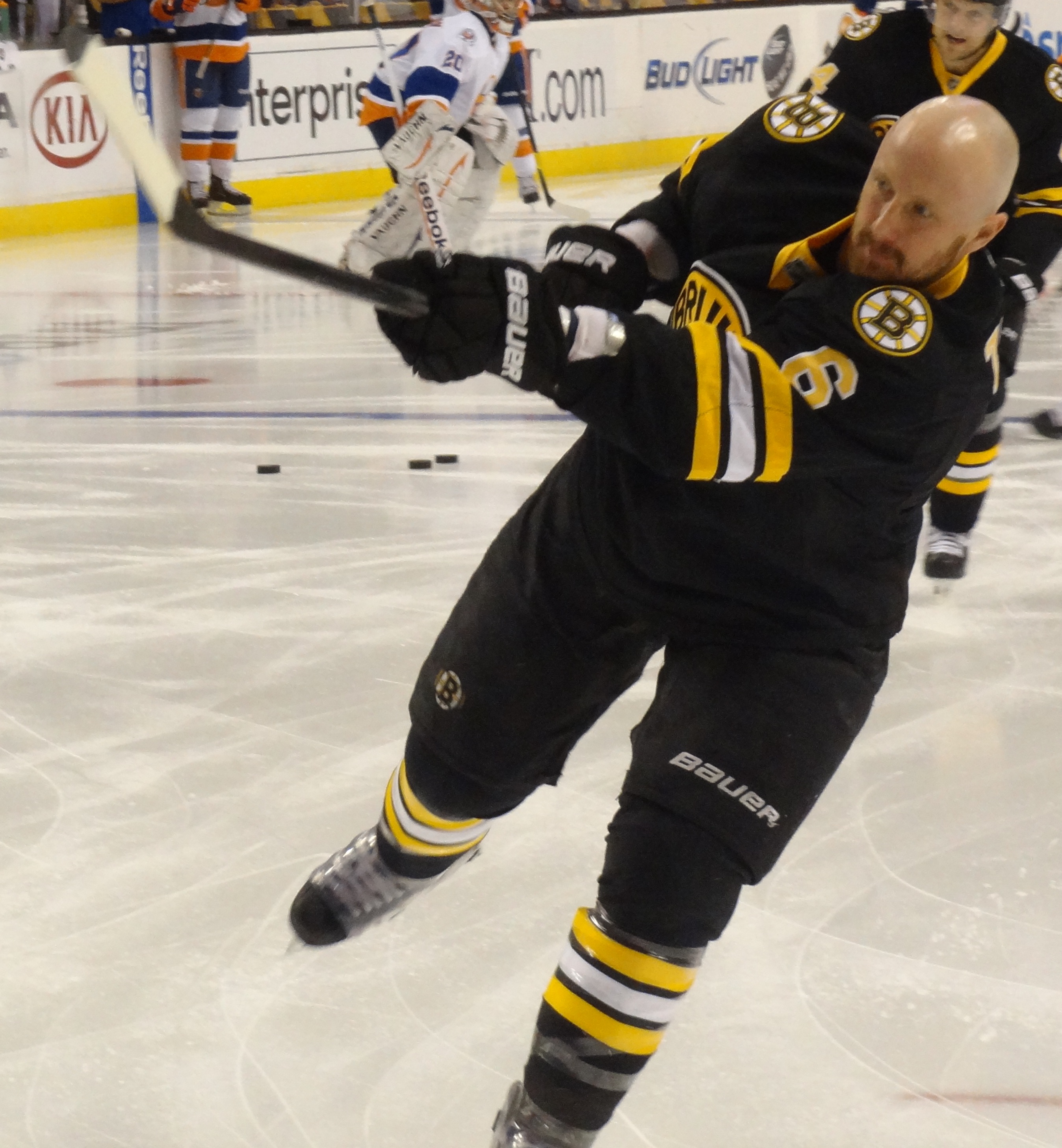
Zanon during the 2011–12 NHL season as a member of the Bruins

On July 1, 2012, Zanon signed as a free agent to a two-year deal worth $4.5 million with the Colorado Avalanche. In the lockout-shortened 2012–13 season, Zanon made his Avalanche debut, recording an assist in an opening night defeat to the Minnesota Wild on January 19, 2013. As a fixture on the Avalanche defense, Zanon was unable to replicate his earlier puck-clearing career form; however, he finished the season to lead the team with 122 blocked shots in 44 games.

On July 3, 2013, the Avalanche placed Zanon, alongside Matt Hunwick, on waivers. Upon clearing waivers, the Avalanche then exercised the option to buy out the remaining year of his contract on July 4, 2013. As a result of the buyout, the Avalanche paid Zanon $1.5 million (two-thirds of his remaining salary) and he became an unrestricted free agent. Unable to attract an NHL offer as a free agent, Zanon signed a professional try-out contract with the San Antonio Rampage of the AHL. As an alternate captain for the Rampage, Zanon returned to the AHL for the first time since 2007.

On July 8, 2014, Zanon was signed as a free agent by the Florida Panthers of the NHL to a one-year, two-way contract. He returned to the Panthers' AHL affiliate, the San Antonio Rampage. As team captain, Zanon appeared in 74 games and contributed offensively with his highest points total in 10 years with 23. At the conclusion of the 2014–15 season, Zanon ended his professional career after 12 seasons.

== Career statistics ==
			Regular season					Playoffs
Season	Team	League	GP	G	A	Pts	PIM	GP	G	A	Pts	PIM
1996–97	Victoria Salsa	BCHL	53	4	13	17	124	—	—	—	—	—
1997–98	Victoria Salsa	BCHL	59	11	21	32	108	7	0	2	2	10
1998–99	South Surrey Eagles	BCHL	59	17	54	71	154	10	5	7	12	22
1999–2000	University of Nebraska Omaha	CCHA	42	3	26	29	56	—	—	—	—	—
2000–01	University of Nebraska Omaha	CCHA	39	12	16	28	64	—	—	—	—	—
2001–02	University of Nebraska Omaha	CCHA	41	9	16	25	54	—	—	—	—	—
2002–03	University of Nebraska Omaha	CCHA	32	6	19	25	44	—	—	—	—	—
2003–04	Milwaukee Admirals	AHL	62	4	12	16	59	22	2	6	8	31
2004–05	Milwaukee Admirals	AHL	80	2	17	19	59	7	0	1	1	10
2005–06	Milwaukee Admirals	AHL	71	8	27	35	55	21	1	7	8	24
2005–06	Nashville Predators	NHL	4	0	2	2	6	—	—	—	—	—
2006–07	Milwaukee Admirals	AHL	2	0	2	2	0	—	—	—	—	—
2006–07	Nashville Predators	NHL	66	3	5	8	32	5	0	2	2	2
2007–08	Nashville Predators	NHL	78	0	5	5	24	6	0	2	2	4
2008–09	Nashville Predators	NHL	82	4	7	11	38	—	—	—	—	—
2009–10	Minnesota Wild	NHL	81	2	13	15	36	—	—	—	—	—
2010–11	Minnesota Wild	NHL	82	0	7	7	48	—	—	—	—	—
2011–12	Minnesota Wild	NHL	39	2	4	6	14	—	—	—	—	—
2011–12	Boston Bruins	NHL	17	1	1	2	4	7	0	1	1	0
2012–13	Colorado Avalanche	NHL	44	0	6	6	28	—	—	—	—	—
2013–14	San Antonio Rampage	AHL	24	0	4	4	34	—	—	—	—	—
2014–15	San Antonio Rampage	AHL	74	3	23	26	42	3	0	0	0	4
AHL totals			313	17	85	102	249	53	3	14	17	69
NHL totals			493	12	50	62	230	18	0	5	5	6

== Awards and honours ==
Award	Year
All-CCHA Rookie Team	1999–00
CCHA All-Tournament Team	2000
All-CCHA First Team	2000–01
CCHA Best Offensive Defenseman	2000–01
AHCA West Second-Team All-American	2000–01
All-CCHA Second Team	2001–02
AHCA West Second-Team All-American	2001–02

Awards and achievements
Preceded by Jeff Jillson	CCHA Best Offensive Defenseman; 2000-01	Succeeded by John-Michael Liles
