= Patrick Neaton =

American ice hockey player (born 1971)

- Born: May 21, 1971 (age 54) Redford, Michigan
- Height: 6 ft 0 in (183 cm)
- Weight: 180 lb (82 kg; 12 st 12 lb)
- Position: Defense
- Shot: Left
- Played for: Pittsburgh Penguins; Vienna Capitals
- National team: United States
- NHL draft: 145th overall, 1990; Pittsburgh Penguins
- Playing career: 1993–2002

Patrick Thomas Neaton (born May 21, 1971) is an American former professional ice hockey player who played 9 games in the National Hockey League with the Pittsburgh Penguins during the 1993–94 season. The rest of his career, which lasted from 1993 to 2002, was mainly spent in the International Hockey League. Internationally Neaton played for the American national team at the 1994 and 1995 World Championships.

== Biography ==
Neaton was born in Redford, Michigan. As a youth, he played in the 1984 Quebec International Pee-Wee Hockey Tournament with the Michigan Blades minor ice hockey team.

He was also the co-captain of the University of Michigan ice hockey team, before he played for the Pittsburgh Penguins.

He currently resides in Michigan.

== Career statistics ==
=== Regular season and playoffs ===
			Regular season					Playoffs
Season	Team	League	GP	G	A	Pts	PIM	GP	G	A	Pts	PIM
1987–88	Detroit Little Caesars	MNHL	71	12	26	38	—	—	—	—	—	—
1988–89	Thornhill Thunderbirds	MetJBHL	36	16	42	58	76	—	—	—	—	—
1989–90	University of Michigan	CCHA	42	3	23	26	36	—	—	—	—	—
1990–91	University of Michigan	CCHA	44	15	28	43	78	—	—	—	—	—
1991–92	University of Michigan	CCHA	43	10	20	30	62	—	—	—	—	—
1992–93	University of Michigan	CCHA	38	10	18	28	37	—	—	—	—	—
1993–94	Pittsburgh Penguins	NHL	9	1	1	2	12	—	—	—	—	—
1993–94	Cleveland Lumberjacks	IHL	71	8	24	32	78	—	—	—	—	—
1994–95	Cleveland Lumberjacks	IHL	2	0	0	0	4	—	—	—	—	—
1994–95	San Diego Gulls	IHL	71	8	27	35	86	5	0	1	1	0
1995–96	Orlando Solar Bears	IHL	77	8	27	35	148	21	3	5	8	34
1996–97	Orlando Solar Bears	IHL	81	17	35	52	68	10	0	1	1	13
1997–98	Orlando Solar Bears	IHL	78	11	24	35	114	17	3	11	14	12
1998–99	Orlando Solar Bears	IHL	75	5	22	27	98	17	2	2	4	14
1999–00	Utah Grizzlies	IHL	80	5	21	26	80	5	0	1	1	6
2000–01	Utah Grizzlies	IHL	75	4	16	20	78	—	—	—	—	—
2001–02	Vienna Capitals	AUT	32	4	12	16	80	—	—	—	—	—
IHL totals			610	66	196	262	754	75	8	21	29	79
NHL totals			9	1	1	2	12	—	—	—	—	—

=== International ===
Year	Team	Event	GP	G	A	Pts	PIM
1991	United States	WJC	7	4	2	6	6
1994	United States	WC	8	2	0	2	12
1995	United States	WC	4	1	0	1	8
Junior totals			7	4	2	6	6
Senior totals			12	3	0	3	20

== Awards and honors ==
Award	Year
All-CCHA Rookie Team	1989-90
All-CCHA Second Team	1990-91
All-CCHA First Team	1992-93
