= 1989–90 AHL season =

- League: American Hockey League
- Sport: Ice hockey

Regular season
- F. G. "Teddy" Oke Trophy: Sherbrooke Canadiens
- Season MVP: Paul Ysebaert
- Top scorer: Paul Ysebaert
- MVP: Jeff Hackett

Playoffs
- Champions: Springfield Indians
- Runners-up: Rochester Americans

AHL seasons
- 1988–89 1990–91

The 1989–90 AHL season was the 54th season of the American Hockey League.

Fourteen teams played 80 games each in the schedule. The Sherbrooke Canadiens repeated finishing first overall in the regular season. The Springfield Indians won their sixth Calder Cup championship.

== Final standings ==
- y– indicates team clinched division and a playoff spot
- x– indicates team clinched a playoff spot
- e– indicates team was eliminated from playoff contention

North Division	GP	W	L	T	Pts	GF	GA
y–Sherbrooke Canadiens (MTL)	80	45	23	12	102	301	247
x–Cape Breton Oilers (EDM)	80	39	34	7	85	317	306
x–Springfield Indians (NYI)	80	38	38	4	80	317	310
x–Halifax Citadels (QUE)	80	37	37	6	80	317	300
e–Maine Mariners (BOS)	80	31	38	11	73	294	317
e–Moncton Hawks (WIN)	80	33	42	5	71	265	303
e–New Haven Nighthawks (LAK)	80	32	41	7	71	283	316

South Division	GP	W	L	T	Pts	GF	GA
y–Rochester Americans (BUF)	80	43	28	9	95	337	286
x–Adirondack Red Wings (DET)	80	42	27	11	95	330	304
x–Baltimore Skipjacks (WSH)	80	43	30	7	93	302	265
x–Utica Devils (NJD)	80	44	32	4	92	354	315
e–Newmarket Saints (TOR)	80	31	33	16	78	305	318
e–Hershey Bears (PHI)	80	32	38	10	74	298	296
e–Binghamton Whalers (HFD)	80	11	60	9	31	229	366

== Scoring leaders ==
Note: GP = Games played; G = Goals; A = Assists; Pts = Points; PIM = Penalty minutes

Player	Team	GP	G	A	Pts	PIM
Paul Ysebaert	Utica Devils	74	53	52	105	61
Ross Fitzpatrick	Hershey Bears	74	45	58	103	26
Mike Donnelly	Rochester Americans	68	43	55	98	71
Mark Pederson	Sherbrooke Canadiens	72	53	42	95	60
Don Biggs	Hershey Bears	66	39	53	92	125
Claude Vilgrain	Utica Devils	73	37	52	89	32
Murray Eaves	Adirondack Red Wings	78	40	49	89	35
Dale Krentz	Adirondack Red Wings	74	38	50	88	36
Donald Audette	Rochester Americans	70	42	46	88	78
John LeBlanc	Cape Breton Oilers	77	54	34	88	50

- complete list

== Calder Cup playoffs ==
The league instituted trophies for division champions in the playoffs; the Richard F. Canning Trophy in the North Division, and the Robert W. Clarke Trophy in the South Division.

Division semifinals
1	Sherbrooke	4
4	Halifax	2
North Division
2	Cape Breton	2
3	Springfield	4
1	Rochester	4
4	Utica	1
South Division
2	Adirondack	2
3	Baltimore	4

Division finals
1	Sherbrooke	2
3	Springfield	4
1	Rochester	4
3	Baltimore	2

Calder Cup final
N3	Springfield	4
S1	Rochester	2

== Trophy and award winners ==
Team awards

Calder Cup; Playoff champions:	Springfield Indians
Richard F. Canning Trophy; North division playoff champions:	Springfield Indians
Robert W. Clarke Trophy; South division playoff champions:	Rochester Americans
F. G. "Teddy" Oke Trophy; Regular season champions, North Division:	Sherbrooke Canadiens
John D. Chick Trophy; Regular season champions, South Division:	Rochester Americans

Individual awards

Les Cunningham Award; Most valuable player:	Paul Ysebaert – Utica Devils
John B. Sollenberger Trophy; Top point scorer:	Paul Ysebaert – Utica Devils
Dudley "Red" Garrett Memorial Award; Rookie of the year:	Donald Audette – Rochester Americans
Eddie Shore Award; Defenceman of the year:	Eric Weinrich – Utica Devils
Aldege "Baz" Bastien Memorial Award; Best goaltender:	Jean-Claude Bergeron – Sherbrooke Canadiens
Harry "Hap" Holmes Memorial Award; Lowest goals against average:	Jean-Claude Bergeron and Andre Racicot – Sherbrooke Canadiens
Louis A. R. Pieri Memorial Award; Coach of the year:	Jim Roberts – Springfield Indians
Fred T. Hunt Memorial Award; Sportsmanship / Perseverance:	Murray Eaves – Adirondack Red Wings
Jack A. Butterfield Trophy; MVP of the playoffs:	Jeff Hackett – Springfield Indians

Other awards

James C. Hendy Memorial Award; Most outstanding executive:	David Andrews
James H. Ellery Memorial Awards; Outstanding media coverage:	Mike Kane, Adirondack (newspaper); Ron Rohmer, New Haven (radio); Pyman Productions (television)
Ken McKenzie Award; Outstanding marketing executive:	Don Ostrom, Adirondack Red Wings

== See also ==
- List of AHL seasons

Preceded by 1988–89 AHL season	AHL seasons	Succeeded by 1990–91 AHL season
