= List of All-CCHA Teams =

The All-CCHA Teams are composed of players at all positions from teams that are members of the Central Collegiate Hockey Association, an NCAA Division I hockey-only conference that first existed from 1971 to 2013 and was revived in 2021. Each year, from 1972–73 through 2012–13 and since 2021–22, at the conclusion of the CCHA regular season the head coaches of each member team vote for players to be placed on each all-conference team. The First Team and Second Team were named in every CCHA season after the inaugural year while the Rookie Team was added starting in 1988–89. The all-CCHA teams were discontinued after the 2012–13 season when the original CCHA was dissolved as a consequence of the Big Ten Conference forming its men's ice hockey conference, and were revived along with the league in 2021–22.

In February 2020, seven schools that had announced in 2019 that they would leave the Western Collegiate Hockey Association after that league's 2020–21 season announced that they would revive the CCHA, with league play starting in 2021–22. Four of these seven schools—Bowling Green, Ferris State, Lake Superior State, and Northern Michigan—played in the final season of the original CCHA. A fifth member of the revived league, Michigan Tech, was briefly a CCHA member in the early 1980s.

The all-conference teams are composed of one goaltender, two defensemen and three forwards. If a tie occurs for the final selection at any position, both players are included as part of the all-conference team; if a tie results in an increase in the number of First Team all-stars, the Second Team is reduced in numbers accordingly (as happened in 1974–75 and 2010–11). Players may only appear once per year on any of the first or second teams but freshmen may appear on both the rookie team and one of the other all-conference teams.

== All-conference teams ==
=== First Team ===
==== 1970s ====
1972–73
Player	Pos	Team
Ralph Kloiber	G	Saint Louis
Roger Archer	D	Bowling Green
Bill Slewidge	D	Lake Superior State
Rick Kennedy	F	Saint Louis
John Nestic	F	Saint Louis
Ray Meyers	F	Ohio State

1973–74
Player	Pos	Team
Pat Tims	G	Lake Superior State
Roger Archer	D	Bowling Green
Tom Davies	D	Lake Superior State
Bob Dobek	F	Bowling Green
Kim Gellert	F	Lake Superior State
John Nestic	F	Saint Louis

1974–75
Player	Pos	Team
Mike Liut	G	Bowling Green
Al Sarachman	G	Bowling Green
Lindsay Middlebrook	G	Saint Louis
Roger Archer	D	Bowling Green
Kevin O'Rear	D	Saint Louis
Bob Dobek	F	Bowling Green
Doug Ross	F	Bowling Green
Rick Kennedy	F	Saint Louis

1975–76
Player	Pos	Team
Al Sarachman	G	Bowling Green
John Mavity	D	Bowling Green
Ken Morrow	D	Bowling Green
Bruce Allworth	F	Ohio State
Gary Murphy	F	Saint Louis
Mike Ballanger	F	Saint Louis

1976–77
Player	Pos	Team
Mike Liut	G	Bowling Green
John Mavity	D	Bowling Green
Kent Jackson	D	Saint Louis
Mark Wells	F	Bowling Green
John Markell	F	Bowling Green
Tim Dunlop	F	Western Michigan

1977–78
Player	Pos	Team
Brian Stankiewicz	G	Bowling Green
Ken Morrow	D	Bowling Green
Don Waddell	D	Northern Michigan
John Markell	F	Bowling Green
Gary Murphy	F	Saint Louis
Bill Joyce	F	Northern Michigan

1978–79
Player	Pos	Team
Wally Charko	G	Bowling Green
Ken Morrow	D	Bowling Green
Tom Laidlaw	D	Northern Michigan
Paul Tilley	F	Ohio State
John Markell	F	Bowling Green
Mark Wells	F	Bowling Green

==== 1980s ====
1979–80
Player	Pos	Team
Steve Weeks	G	Northern Michigan
Tom Laidlaw	D	Northern Michigan
Don Waddell	D	Northern Michigan
Steve Bozek	F	Northern Michigan
Bill Joyce	F	Northern Michigan
Jim Baker	F	Ferris State

1980–81
Player	Pos	Team
Mike Blake	G	Ohio State
Dan Mandich	D	Ohio State
Jim File	D	Ferris State
George Harrison	D	Ferris State
Brent Morrow	D	Ohio State
Jeff Pyle	F	Northern Michigan
Steve Bozek	F	Northern Michigan
Ross Fitzpatrick	F	Western Michigan

1981–82
Player	Pos	Team
Ron Scott	G	Michigan State
Brian MacLellan	D	Bowling Green
Jim File	D	Ferris State
George McPhee	F	Bowling Green
Brian Hills	F	Bowling Green
Newell Brown	F	Michigan State

1982–83
Player	Pos	Team
Ron Scott	G	Michigan State
Ken Leiter	D	Michigan State
Garry Galley	D	Bowling Green
Brian Hills	F	Bowling Green
Andy Browne	F	Ohio State
Ted Speers	F	Michigan

1983–84
Player	Pos	Team
John Dougan	G	Ohio State
Garry Galley	D	Bowling Green
Dan McFall	D	Michigan State
Paul Pooley	F	Ohio State
Dan Dorion	F	Western Michigan
Dan Kane	F	Bowling Green

1984–85
Player	Pos	Team
Bob Essensa	G	Michigan State
Gary Haight	D	Michigan State
Donald McSween	D	Michigan State
Craig Simpson	F	Michigan State
Ray Staszak	F	Illinois-Chicago
Kelly Miller	F	Michigan State

1985–86
Player	Pos	Team
Gary Kruzich	G	Bowling Green
Donald McSween	D	Michigan State
Wayne Gagné	D	Western Michigan
Mike Donnelly	F	Michigan State
Jamie Wansbrough	F	Bowling Green
Dan Dorion	F	Western Michigan

1986–87
Player	Pos	Team
Gary Kruzich	G	Bowling Green
Wayne Gagné	D	Western Michigan
Donald McSween	D	Michigan State
Mitch Messier	F	Michigan State
Brad Jones	F	Michigan
Iain Duncan	F	Bowling Green

1987–88
Player	Pos	Team
Bruce Hoffort	G	Lake Superior State
Tim Tilley	D	Michigan State
Scott Paluch	D	Bowling Green
Mark Vermette	F	Lake Superior State
Nelson Emerson	F	Bowling Green
Paul Polillo	F	Western Michigan

1988–89
Player	Pos	Team
Bruce Hoffort	G	Lake Superior State
Kord Cernich	D	Lake Superior State
Myles O'Connor	D	Michigan
Greg Parks	F	Bowling Green
Sheldon Gorski	F	Illinois-Chicago
Kip Miller	F	Michigan State

==== 1990s ====
1989–90
Player	Pos	Team
Jason Muzzatti	G	Michigan State
Rob Blake	D	Bowling Green
Kord Cernich	D	Lake Superior State
Kip Miller	F	Michigan State
Nelson Emerson	F	Bowling Green
Craig Fisher	F	Miami

1990–91
Player	Pos	Team
Darrin Madeley	G	Lake Superior State
Karl Johnston	D	Lake Superior State
Jason Woolley	D	Michigan State
Jim Dowd	F	Lake Superior State
Denny Felsner	F	Michigan
Doug Weight	F	Lake Superior State

1991–92
Player	Pos	Team
Darrin Madeley	G	Lake Superior State
Mark Astley	D	Lake Superior State
Joby Messier	D	Michigan State
Denny Felsner	F	Michigan
Dwayne Norris	F	Michigan State
Keith Jones	F	Western Michigan

1992–93
Player	Pos	Team
Steve Shields	G	Michigan
Patrick Neaton	D	Michigan
Joe Cook	D	Miami
Brian Rolston	F	Lake Superior State
Brian Savage	F	Miami
Bryan Smolinski	F	Michigan State

1993–94
Player	Pos	Team
Steve Shields	G	Michigan
John Gruden	D	Ferris State
Jeff Wells	D	Bowling Green
David Oliver	F	Michigan
Brian Wiseman	F	Michigan
Anson Carter	F	Michigan State

1994–95
Player	Pos	Team
Chuck Thuss	G	Miami
Kelly Perrault	D	Bowling Green
Keith Aldridge	D	Lake Superior State
Brian Holzinger	F	Bowling Green
Anson Carter	F	Michigan State
Brendan Morrison	F	Michigan

1995–96
Player	Pos	Team
Marc Magliarditi	G	Western Michigan
Keith Aldridge	D	Lake Superior State
Andy Roach	D	Ferris State
Brendan Morrison	F	Michigan
Sean Tallaire	F	Lake Superior State
Kevin Hilton	F	Michigan

1996–97
Player	Pos	Team
Marty Turco	G	Michigan
Dan Boyle	D	Miami
Andy Roach	D	Ferris State
Brendan Morrison	F	Michigan
Randy Robitaille	F	Miami
John Madden	F	Michigan

1997–98
Player	Pos	Team
Chad Alban	G	Michigan State
Tyler Harlton	D	Michigan State
Dan Boyle	D	Miami
Bill Muckalt	F	Michigan
Sean Berens	F	Michigan State
Hugo Boisvert	F	Ohio State

1998–99
Player	Pos	Team
Jeff Maund	G	Ohio State
Mike Weaver	D	Michigan State
Benoit Cotnoir	D	Notre Dame
Hugo Boisvert	F	Ohio State
Mike York	F	Michigan State
Adam Edinger	F	Bowling Green

==== 2000s ====
1999–00
Player	Pos	Team
Jayme Platt	G	Lake Superior State
Mike Weaver	D	Michigan State
Jeff Jillson	D	Michigan
Roger Trudeau	F	Northern Michigan
Shawn Horcoff	F	Michigan State
Mike Comrie	F	Michigan

2000–01
Player	Pos	Team
Ryan Miller	G	Michigan State
Jeff Jillson	D	Michigan
Greg Zanon	D	Nebraska-Omaha
Andy Hilbert	F	Michigan
Mike Cammalleri	F	Michigan
David Brisson	F	Nebraska-Omaha

2001–02
Player	Pos	Team
Ryan Miller	G	Michigan State
John-Michael Liles	D	Michigan State
Mike Komisarek	D	Michigan
Jeff Hoggan	F	Nebraska-Omaha
Chris Kunitz	F	Ferris State
Rob Collins	F	Ferris State

2002–03
Player	Pos	Team
Mike Brown	G	Ferris State
Brad Fast	D	Michigan State
John-Michael Liles	D	Michigan State
Chris Kunitz	F	Ferris State
Jim Slater	F	Michigan State
R. J. Umberger	F	Ohio State

2003–04
Player	Pos	Team
Jordan Sigalet	G	Bowling Green
Andy Greene	D	Miami
A. J. Thelen	D	Michigan State
Derek Edwardson	F	Miami
T. J. Hensick	F	Michigan
Jim Slater	F	Michigan State

2004–05
Player	Pos	Team
Tuomas Tarkki	G	Northern Michigan
Andy Greene	D	Miami
Nathan Oystrick	D	Northern Michigan
T. J. Hensick	F	Michigan
Scott Parse	F	Nebraska-Omaha
Jeff Tambellini	F	Michigan

2005–06
Player	Pos	Team
Jeff Jakaitis	G	Lake Superior State
Andy Greene	D	Miami
Nathan Oystrick	D	Northern Michigan
Scott Parse	F	Nebraska-Omaha
Nathan Davis	F	Miami
Bill Thomas	F	Nebraska-Omaha

2006–07
Player	Pos	Team
David Brown	G	Notre Dame
Jack Johnson	D	Michigan
Matt Hunwick	D	Michigan
T. J. Hensick	F	Michigan
Mike Santorelli	F	Northern Michigan
Scott Parse	F	Nebraska-Omaha

2007–08
Player	Pos	Team
Jeff Lerg	G	Michigan State
Tyler Eckford	D	Alaska
Alec Martinez	D	Miami
Kevin Porter	F	Michigan
Ryan Jones	F	Miami
Chad Kolarik	F	Michigan

2008–09
Player	Pos	Team
Chad Johnson	G	Alaska
Erik Gustafsson	D	Northern Michigan
Ian Cole	D	Notre Dame
Carter Camper	F	Miami
Aaron Palushaj	F	Michigan
Louie Caporusso	F	Michigan

==== 2010s ====
2009–10
Player	Pos	Team
Cody Reichard	G	Miami
Erik Gustafsson	D	Northern Michigan
Eddie DelGrosso	D	Nebraska-Omaha
Mark Olver	F	Northern Michigan
Jarod Palmer	F	Miami
Zac Dalpe	F	Ohio State

2010–11
Player	Pos	Team
Pat Nagle	G	Ferris State
Zach Redmond	D	Ferris State
Torey Krug	D	Michigan State
Andy Miele	F	Miami
Carl Hagelin	F	Michigan
Carter Camper	F	Miami
Reilly Smith	F	Miami

2011–12
Player	Pos	Team
Taylor Nelson	G	Ferris State
Torey Krug	D	Michigan State
Chad Billins	D	Ferris State
Reilly Smith	F	Miami
Tyler Gron	F	Northern Michigan
T. J. Tynan	F	Notre Dame

2012–13
Player	Pos	Team
Brady Hjelle	G	Ohio State
Jacob Trouba	D	Michigan
Danny DeKeyser	D	Western Michigan
Austin Czarnik	F	Miami
Anders Lee	F	Notre Dame
Riley Barber	F	Miami

==== 2020s ====
2021–22
Player	Pos	Team
Dryden McKay	G	Minnesota State
Jake Livingstone	D	Minnesota State
Elias Rosén	D	Bemidji State
Nathan Smith	F	Minnesota State
Brian Halonen	F	Michigan Tech
Julian Napravnik	F	Minnesota State

2022–23
Player	Pos	Team
Blake Pietila	G	Michigan Tech
Jake Livingstone	D	Minnesota State
Elias Rosén	D	Bemidji State
Ryland Mosley	F	Michigan Tech
David Silye	F	Minnesota State
Austen Swankler	F	Bowling Green

2023–24
Player	Pos	Team
Mattias Sholl	G	Bemidji State
Kyle Looft	D	Bemidji State
Eric Pohlkamp	D	Bemidji State
Sam Morton	F	Minnesota State
Lleyton Roed	F	Bemidji State
Jared Westcott	F	Lake Superior State

2024–25
Player	Pos	Team
Alex Tracy	G	Minnesota State
Evan Murr	D	Minnesota State
Chase Pietila	D	Michigan Tech
Liam Malmquist	F	St. Thomas
Rhett Pitlick	F	Minnesota State
Lucas Wahlin	F	St. Thomas

==== First Team players by school ====
Current CCHA Teams

School	Winners
Bowling Green	44
Lake Superior State	22
Northern Michigan	19
Ferris State	15
Minnesota State	10
Bemidji State	6
Michigan Tech	4
St. Thomas	1

Former CCHA Teams

School	Winners
Michigan State	42
Michigan	35
Miami	23
Ohio State	15
Saint Louis	11
Western Michigan	10
Nebraska–Omaha	8
Notre Dame	5
Alaska	2
Illinois–Chicago	2

==== Multiple appearances ====
Player	Appearances
Roger Archer	3
Andy Greene	3
T. J. Hensick	3
John Markell	3
Don McSween	3
Brendan Morrison	3
Ken Morrow	3
Scott Parse	3
many player tied with	2

=== Second Team ===
==== 1970s ====
1972–73
Player	Pos	Team
Don Boyd	G	Bowling Green
Don Muio	G	Lake Superior State
Chuck Gyles	D	Bowling Green
Jim Witherspoon	D	Ohio State
Julio Francella	F	Lake Superior State
Mike Bartley	F	Bowling Green
Dave Davies	F	Saint Louis

1973–74
Player	Pos	Team
Ralph Kloiber	G	Saint Louis
Mario Faubert	D	Saint Louis
Bill Slewidge	D	Lake Superior State
John Stewart	F	Bowling Green
Rick Kennedy	F	Saint Louis
Charlie Labelle	F	Saint Louis

1974–75
Player	Pos	Team
	G	
Kent Jackson	D	Saint Louis
Marc Gaudreault	D	Lake Superior State
Mike Hartman	F	Bowling Green
Mike Gaba	F	Lake Superior State
Julio Francella	F	Lake Superior State

1975–76
Player	Pos	Team
Mike Liut	G	Bowling Green
Kent Jackson	D	Saint Louis
George Kryzer	D	Saint Louis
Mike Hartman	F	Bowling Green
Mike Gaba	F	Lake Superior State
Kim Gellert	F	Lake Superior State

1976–77
Player	Pos	Team
Pat Tims	G	Lake Superior State
Ken Morrow	D	Bowling Green
Doug Butler	D	Saint Louis
Gary Murphy	F	Saint Louis
Wayne Ormson	F	Saint Louis
Paul Tilley	F	Ohio State

1977–78
Player	Pos	Team
Brian O'Connell	G	Saint Louis
Doug Butler	D	Saint Louis
Kent Jackson	D	Saint Louis
Bernie Saunders	F	Western Michigan
Paul Cappuccio	F	Western Michigan
Byron Shutt	F	Bowling Green

1978–79
Player	Pos	Team
Steve Jones	G	Ohio State
Murray Skinner	G	Lake Superior State
Steve Weeks	G	Northern Michigan
George Kryzer	D	Saint Louis
Doug Butler	D	Saint Louis
George McPhee	F	Bowling Green
Chris Valentine	F	Saint Louis
Ron Sandzik	F	Lake Superior State

==== 1980s ====
1979–80
Player	Pos	Team
Steve Jones	G	Ohio State
John Gibb	D	Bowling Green
Mike Cotter	D	Bowling Green
Brian Jenks	D	Ohio State
Greg Kostenko	D	Ohio State
Rod McNair	D	Ohio State
Paul Pickard	D	Ferris State
Larry Marson	F	Ohio State
Paul Tilley	F	Ohio State
Steve Mulholland	F	Lake Superior State
Bob Scurfield	F	Western Michigan

1980–81
Player	Pos	Team
Jeff Poeschl	G	Northern Michigan
	D	
	D	
Paul Pooley	F	Ohio State
George McPhee	F	Bowling Green
Brian Hills	F	Bowling Green

1981–82
Player	Pos	Team
Jon Elliot	G	Michigan
Steve Richmond	D	Michigan
Gary Haight	D	Michigan State
John Schmidt	D	Notre Dame
Dave Poulin	F	Notre Dame
Mark Hamway	F	Michigan State
Larry Marson	F	Ohio State

1982–83
Player	Pos	Team
John Dougan	G	Ohio State
Gary Haight	D	Michigan State
Kevin Beaton	D	Miami
Kirt Bjork	F	Notre Dame
Dan Kane	F	Bowling Green
Dave Kobryn	F	Ohio State

1983–84
Player	Pos	Team
Norm Foster	G	Michigan State
Dave Ellett	D	Bowling Green
Jim File	D	Ferris State
Perry Pooley	F	Ohio State
Randy Merrifield	F	Ferris State
John Samanski	F	Bowling Green

1984–85
Player	Pos	Team
Glenn Healy	G	Western Michigan
Dan McFall	D	Michigan State
Mike Rousseau	D	Ohio State
Jamie Wansbrough	F	Bowling Green
Allan Butler	F	Lake Superior State
Tom Anastos	F	Michigan State

1985–86
Player	Pos	Team
Bob Essensa	G	Michigan State
Brian McKee	D	Bowling Green
Chris MacDonald	D	Western Michigan
Paul Ysebaert	F	Bowling Green
Brad Jones	F	Michigan
Stu Burnie	F	Western Michigan

1986–87
Player	Pos	Team
Bill Horn	G	Western Michigan
Brian McKee	D	Bowling Green
Jeff Norton	D	Michigan
Paul Ysebaert	F	Bowling Green
Bill Shibicky	F	Michigan State
Rob Brynden	F	Western Michigan

1987–88
Player	Pos	Team
Jason Muzzatti	G	Michigan State
Kord Cernich	D	Lake Superior State
Mike Posma	D	Western Michigan
Barry McKinlay	D	Illinois-Chicago
Mike de Carle	F	Lake Superior State
Bobby Reynolds	F	Michigan State
Ron Hoover	F	Western Michigan

1988–89
Player	Pos	Team
Dave DePinto	G	Illinois-Chicago
Rob Blake	D	Bowling Green
Chris Luongo	D	Michigan State
Bobby Reynolds	F	Michigan State
Nelson Emerson	F	Bowling Green
Todd Brost	F	Michigan

==== 1990s ====
1989–90
Player	Pos	Team
Darrin Madeley	G	Lake Superior State
Don Gibson	D	Michigan State
Dan Keczmer	D	Lake Superior State
Jim Dowd	F	Lake Superior State
Darryl Noren	F	Illinois-Chicago
Pat Murray	F	Michigan State

1990–91
Player	Pos	Team
Mike Gilmore	G	Michigan State
Mark Astley	D	Lake Superior State
Patrick Neaton	D	Michigan
David Roberts	F	Michigan
Rod Taylor	F	Ferris State
Mike Eastwood	F	Western Michigan

1991–92
Player	Pos	Team
Jon Hillebrandt	G	Illinois-Chicago
Joe Cook	D	Miami
Steven Barnes	D	Lake Superior State
Sandy Moger	F	Lake Superior State
Peter Homles	F	Bowling Green
Martin Jiranek	F	Bowling Green

1992–93
Player	Pos	Team
Richard Shulmistra	G	Miami
Bob Marshall	D	Miami
Michael Smith	D	Lake Superior State
Brian Holzinger	F	Bowling Green
David Roberts	F	Michigan
David Oliver	F	Michigan

1993–94
Player	Pos	Team
Mike Buzak	G	Michigan State
Bob Marshall	D	Miami
Keith Aldridge	D	Lake Superior State
Steve Guolla	F	Michigan State
Mike Knuble	F	Michigan
Clayton Beddoes	F	Lake Superior State

1994–95
Player	Pos	Team
Mike Buzak	G	Michigan State
Andy Roach	D	Ferris State
Steven Halko	D	Michigan
Mike Knuble	F	Michigan
Kevyn Adams	F	Miami
Rem Murray	F	Michigan State

1995–96
Player	Pos	Team
Tom Sakey	G	Ohio State
Steven Halko	D	Michigan
Kelly Perrault	D	Bowling Green
Jason Botterill	F	Michigan
Anson Carter	F	Michigan State
Jeremy Brown	F	Western Michigan

1996–97
Player	Pos	Team
Trevor Prior	G	Miami
Joe Corvo	D	Western Michigan
Harold Schock	D	Michigan
Sean Berens	F	Michigan State
Joe Blaznek	F	Lake Superior State
Jason Sessa	F	Lake Superior State

1997–98
Player	Pos	Team
Marty Turco	G	Michigan
Bubba Berenzweig	D	Michigan
Brett Colborne	D	Ferris State
Mike York	F	Michigan State
Terry Marchant	F	Lake Superior State
Bobby Hayes	F	Michigan

1998–99
Player	Pos	Team
Joe Blackburn	G	Michigan State
Mike Jones	D	Bowling Green
Andrè Signoretti	D	Ohio State
Dan Price	F	Bowling Green
Ben Simon	F	Notre Dame
J. P. Vigier	F	Northern Michigan

==== 2000s ====
1999–00
Player	Pos	Team
Ryan Miller	G	Michigan State
Kevin Schmidt	D	Northern Michigan
Dave Huntzicker	D	Michigan
David Gove	F	Western Michigan
Adam Hall	F	Michigan State
Brian McCullough	F	Ferris State

2000–01
Player	Pos	Team
Josh Blackburn	G	Michigan
Phil Osaer	G	Ferris State
Andrew Hutchinson	D	Michigan State
John-Michael Liles	D	Michigan State
Mike Bishai	F	Western Michigan
Jason Deskins	F	Miami
David Gove	F	Western Michigan

2001–02
Player	Pos	Team
Dan Ellis	G	Nebraska-Omaha
Andrew Hutchinson	D	Michigan State
Greg Zanon	D	Nebraska-Omaha
Mike Cammalleri	F	Michigan
Bobby Andrews	F	Alaska-Fairbanks
John Shouneyia	F	Michigan

2002–03
Player	Pos	Team
Mike Betz	G	Ohio State
Simon Mangos	D	Ferris State
Troy Milam	D	Ferris State
Mike Kompon	F	Miami
Jeff Legue	F	Ferris State
Jeff Tambellini	F	Michigan

2003–04
Player	Pos	Team
Al Montoya	G	Michigan
Brett Lebda	D	Notre Dame
Nathan Oystrick	D	Northern Michigan
Brandon Rogers	D	Michigan
Aaron Gill	F	Notre Dame
Rob Globke	F	Notre Dame
Greg Hogeboom	F	Miami

2004–05
Player	Pos	Team
Jordan Sigalet	G	Bowling Green
Nate Guenin	D	Ohio State
Matt Hunwick	D	Michigan
Rod Pelley	F	Ohio State
Bill Thomas	F	Nebraska-Omaha
Brent Walton	F	Western Michigan

2005–06
Player	Pos	Team
Charlie Effinger	G	Miami
Mitch Ganzak	D	Miami
Matt Hunwick	D	Michigan
T. J. Hensick	F	Michigan
Alex Foster	F	Bowling Green
Ryan Jones	F	Miami

2006–07
Player	Pos	Team
Jeff Jakaitis	G	Lake Superior State
Sean Collins	D	Ohio State
Derek Smith	D	Lake Superior State
Nathan Davis	F	Miami
Kevin Porter	F	Michigan
Ryan Jones	F	Miami

2007–08
Player	Pos	Team
Jeff Zatkoff	G	Miami
Mitch Ganzak	D	Miami
Mark Mitera	D	Michigan
Bryan Marshall	F	Nebraska-Omaha
Derek Whitmore	F	Bowling Green
Tim Kennedy	F	Michigan State

2008–09
Player	Pos	Team
Jeff Lerg	G	Michigan State
Kyle Lawson	D	Notre Dame
Eddie DelGrosso	D	Nebraska-Omaha
Erik Condra	F	Notre Dame
Christian Hanson	F	Notre Dame
Patrick Galivan	F	Western Michigan

==== 2010s ====
2009–10
Player	Pos	Team
Drew Palmisano	G	Michigan State
Zach Redmond	D	Ferris State
Jeff Petry	D	Michigan State
Andy Miele	F	Miami
Tommy Wingels	F	Miami
Corey Tropp	F	Michigan State

2010–11
Player	Pos	Team
Scott Greenham	G	Alaska
Chris Wideman	D	Miami
John Merrill	D	Michigan
T. J. Tynan	F	Notre Dame
Anders Lee	F	Notre Dame
	F	

2011–12
Player	Pos	Team
Shawn Hunwick	G	Michigan
Danny DeKeyser	D	Western Michigan
Matt Tennyson	D	Western Michigan
Justin Florek	F	Northern Michigan
Cody Kunyk	F	Alaska
Jordie Johnston	F	Ferris State

2012–13
Player	Pos	Team
Frank Slubowski	G	Western Michigan
Luke Witkowski	D	Western Michigan
Bobby Shea	D	Bowling Green
Tanner Fritz	F	Ohio State
Ryan Carpenter	F	Bowling Green
Andy Taranto	F	Alaska

==== 2020s ====
2021–22
Player	Pos	Team
Blake Pietila	G	Michigan Tech
Colin Swoyer	D	Michigan Tech
Jacob Bengtsson	D	Lake Superior State
Owen Sillinger	F	Bemidji State
Louis Boudon	F	Lake Superior State
Trenton Bliss	F	Michigan Tech
AJ Vanderbeck	F	Northern Michigan

2022–23
Player	Pos	Team
Mattias Sholl	G	Bemidji State
Akito Hirose	D	Minnesota State
Brett Thorne	D	Michigan Tech
Louis Boudon	F	Lake Superior State
Nathan Burke	F	Bowling Green
André Ghantous	F	Northern Michigan

2023–24
Player	Pos	Team
Blake Pietila	G	Michigan Tech
Evan Murr	D	Minnesota State
Josh Zinger	D	Northern Michigan
Isaac Gordon	F	Michigan Tech
Connor Milburn	F	Lake Superior State
Lucas Wahlin	F	St. Thomas

2024–25
Player	Pos	Team
Josh Kotai	G	Augustana
Chase Foley	D	St. Thomas
Travis Shoudy	D	Ferris State
Luke Mobley	F	Augustana
Ryan O'Hara	F	Bowling Green
Brody Waters	F	Bowling Green

==== Second Team players by school ====
Current CCHA Teams

School	Winners
Bowling Green	38
Lake Superior State	33
Ferris State	15
Northern Michigan	9
Michigan Tech	6
Bemidji State	2
Minnesota State	2
St. Thomas	2

Former CCHA Teams

School	Winners
Michigan	32
Michigan State	30
Western Michigan	22
Ohio State	21
Miami	20
Saint Louis	17
Notre Dame	12
Nebraska-Omaha	5
Alaska	4
Illinois-Chicago	4

==== Multiple appearances ====
Player	Appearances
Kent Jackson	3
Louis Boudon	2
Doug Butler	2
Mike Buzak	2
Julio Francella	2
Mike Gaba	2
David Gove	2
Gary Haight	2
Steven Halko	2
Mike Hartman	2
Matt Hunwick	2
Andrew Hutchinson	2

Player	Appearances
Ryan Jones	2
Steve Jones	2
Mike Knuble	2
George Kryzer	2
Bob Marshall	2
Brian McKee	2
George McPhee	2
Blake Pietila	2
Bobby Reynolds	2
David Roberts	2
Paul Tilley	2
Paul Ysebaert	2

=== Rookie Team ===
==== 1980s ====
1988–89
Player	Pos	Team
	G	
Jason Woolley	D	Michigan State
	D	
Rod Brind'Amour	F	Michigan State
Denny Felsner	F	Michigan
Craig Fisher	F	Miami
Ken House	F	Miami
Peter White	F	Michigan State

==== 1990s ====
1989–90
Player	Pos	Team
Darrin Madeley	G	Lake Superior State
Patrick Neaton	D	Michigan
Glenn Painter	D	Ohio State
Brett Harkins	F	Bowling Green
David Roberts	F	Michigan
Doug Weight	F	Lake Superior State

1990–91
Player	Pos	Team
Pat Mazzoli	G	Ferris State
Steven Barnes	D	Lake Superior State
Aaron Ward	D	Michigan
Clayton Beddoes	F	Lake Superior State
David Oliver	F	Michigan
Brian Wiseman	F	Michigan

1991–92
Player	Pos	Team
Jon Hillebrandt	G	Illinois-Chicago
Chris Belanger	D	Western Michigan
Daniel Daikawa	D	Miami
Brian Loney	F	Ohio State
Rem Murray	F	Michigan State
Steve Suk	F	Michigan State

1992–93
Player	Pos	Team
Aaron Ellis	G	Bowling Green
Scott Chartier	D	Western Michigan
Justin Krall	D	Miami
Chris Brooks	F	Western Michigan
Jamie Ling	F	Notre Dame
Sean Tallaire	F	Lake Superior State

1993–94
Player	Pos	Team
Bob Petrie	G	Bowling Green
Andy Roach	D	Ferris State
Harold Schock	D	Michigan
Blake Sloan	D	Michigan
Jason Botterill	F	Michigan
Curtis Fry	F	Bowling Green
Brendan Morrison	F	Michigan

1994–95
Player	Pos	Team
Marty Turco	G	Michigan
Dan Boyle	D	Miami
Steve Duke	D	Western Michigan
Bill Muckalt	F	Michigan
Robb Gordon	F	Michigan
Jason Blake	F	Ferris State

1995–96
Player	Pos	Team
Marc Magliarditi	G	Western Michigan
Joe Corvo	D	Western Michigan
Chris Bogas	D	Michigan State
Tony Kolozsy	F	Illinois-Chicago
Mike York	F	Michigan State
Randy Robitaille	F	Miami

1996–97
Player	Pos	Team
Chris Marvel	G	Alaska-Fairbanks
Daryl Andrews	D	Western Michigan
Josh Mizerek	D	Miami
Hugo Boisvert	F	Ohio State
Joe Dusbabek	F	Notre Dame
Adam Edinger	F	Bowling Green

1997–98
Player	Pos	Team
Jeff Maund	G	Ohio State
Mark Eaton	D	Notre Dame
Mike Van Ryn	D	Michigan
Rustyn Dolyny	F	Michigan State
Mark Kosick	F	Michigan
Kevin Swider	F	Ferris State

1998–99
Player	Pos	Team
Josh Blackburn	G	Michigan
Jason Crain	D	Ohio State
Jeff Jillson	D	Michigan
Mike Comrie	F	Michigan
David Inman	F	Notre Dame
Adam Hall	F	Michigan State
Chad Theuer	F	Northern Michigan

==== 2000s ====
1999–00
Player	Pos	Team
Ryan Miller	G	Michigan State
Greg Zanon	D	Nebraska-Omaha
Jimmy Jackson	D	Northern Michigan
Andy Hilbert	F	Michigan
Chris Gobert	F	Northern Michigan
David Brisson	F	Nebraska-Omaha

2000–01
Player	Pos	Team
Dan Ellis	G	Nebraska-Omaha
Mike Komisarek	D	Michigan
Brett Lebda	D	Notre Dame
Jeff Campbell	F	Michigan
Dave Steckel	F	Ohio State
R. J. Umberger	F	Ohio State

2001–02
Player	Pos	Team
Mike Brown	G	Ferris State
Eric Werner	D	Michigan
Matt York	D	Ferris State
Patrick Dwyer	F	Western Michigan
Eric Nystrom	F	Michigan
Jim Slater	F	Michigan State
Aaron Voros	F	Alaska-Fairbanks

2002–03
Player	Pos	Team
Al Montoya	G	Michigan
Andy Greene	D	Miami
Danny Richmond	D	Michigan
Vince Bellissimo	F	Western Michigan
David Booth	F	Michigan State
Jeff Tambellini	F	Michigan

2003–04
Player	Pos	Team
Dominic Vicari	G	Michigan State
Matt Hunwick	D	Michigan
A. J. Thelen	D	Michigan State
Matt Christie	F	Miami
Marty Guerin	F	Miami
T. J. Hensick	F	Michigan

2004–05
Player	Pos	Team
Wylie Rogers	G	Alaska-Fairbanks
Joe Grimaldi	D	Nebraska-Omaha
Mike Hodgson	D	Bowling Green
Tom Fritsche	F	Ohio State
Mike Santorelli	F	Northern Michigan
Bill Thomas	F	Nebraska-Omaha

2005–06
Player	Pos	Team
Jeff Lerg	G	Michigan State
Tyler Eckford	D	Alaska-Fairbanks
Jack Johnson	D	Michigan
Andrew Cogliano	F	Michigan
Erik Condra	F	Notre Dame
Dan Riedel	F	Ferris State

2006–07
Player	Pos	Team
Riley Gill	G	Michigan
Eddie DelGrosso	D	Nebraska-Omaha
Kyle Lawson	D	Notre Dame
Kevin Deeth	F	Notre Dame
Mark Letestu	F	Western Michigan
Ryan Thang	F	Notre Dame

2007–08
Player	Pos	Team
Nick Eno	G	Bowling Green
Erik Gustafsson	D	Northern Michigan
Jeff Petry	D	Michigan State
Carter Camper	F	Miami
Max Pacioretty	F	Michigan
Jacob Cepis	F	Bowling Green
Mark Olver	F	Northern Michigan

2008–09
Player	Pos	Team
Connor Knapp	G	Miami
Chris Wideman	D	Miami
Matt Bartkowski	D	Ohio State
Brandon Burlon	D	Michigan
Zac Dalpe	F	Ohio State
Billy Maday	F	Notre Dame
David Wohlberg	F	Michigan

==== 2010s ====
2009–10
Player	Pos	Team
Mike Johnson	G	Notre Dame
Joe Hartman	D	Miami
Torey Krug	D	Michigan State
Chris Brown	F	Michigan
Terry Broadhurst	F	Nebraska-Omaha
Andy Taranto	F	Alaska

2010–11
Player	Pos	Team
Kevin Kapalka	G	Lake Superior State
Danny DeKeyser	D	Western Michigan
John Merrill	D	Michigan
Chase Balisy	F	Western Michigan
Anders Lee	F	Notre Dame
T. J. Tynan	F	Notre Dame

2011–12
Player	Pos	Team
Frank Slubowski	G	Western Michigan
Garrett Haar	D	Western Michigan
Robbie Russo	D	Notre Dame
Austin Czarnik	F	Miami
Alex Guptill	F	Michigan
Max McCormick	F	Ohio State

2012–13
Player	Pos	Team
Ryan McKay	G	Miami
Jacob Trouba	D	Michigan
Matthew Caito	D	Miami
Kenney Morrison	D	Western Michigan
Riley Barber	F	Miami
Mario Lucia	F	Notre Dame
Tyler Morley	F	Alaska

==== 2020s ====
2021–22
Player	Pos	Team
Mattias Sholl	G	Bemidji State
Charlie Glockner	G	Northern Michigan
Eric Parker	D	Bowling Green
Bennett Zmolek	D	Minnesota State
Bradley Marek	F	Ferris State
Austin Swankler	F	Bowling Green
Josh Nixon	F	Lake Superior State

2022–23
Player	Pos	Team
Béni Halász	G	Northern Michigan
Dalton Norris	D	Bowling Green
Josh Zinger	D	Northern Michigan
Kyle Kukkonen	F	Michigan Tech
Joey Larson	F	Northern Michigan
Lleyton Roed	F	Bemidji State

2023–24
Player	Pos	Team
Cole Moore	G	Bowling Green
Evan Murr	D	Minnesota State
Eric Pohlkamp	D	Bemidji State
Luigi Benincasa	F	Ferris State
Isaac Gordon	F	Michigan Tech
John Herrington	F	Lake Superior State

2024–25
Player	Pos	Team
Rorke Applebee	G	Lake Superior State
Rylan Brown	D	Michigan Tech
Isa Parekh	D	Bemidji State
Jakub Altrichter	F	Northern Michigan
Elias Jansson	F	Michigan Tech
Logan Morrell	F	Michigan Tech

==== Rookie Team players by school ====
Current CCHA Teams

School	Winners
Bowling Green	12
Northern Michigan	11
Ferris State	9
Lake Superior State	9
Michigan Tech	5
Bemidji State	4
Minnesota State	2

Former CCHA Teams

School	Winners
Michigan	38
Miami	18
Michigan State	15
Notre Dame	15
Western Michigan	15
Ohio State	11
Nebraska-Omaha	7
Alaska	6
Illinois-Chicago	2

== See also ==
- CCHA Awards
