= Jeff Jillson =

American ice hockey player (born 1980)

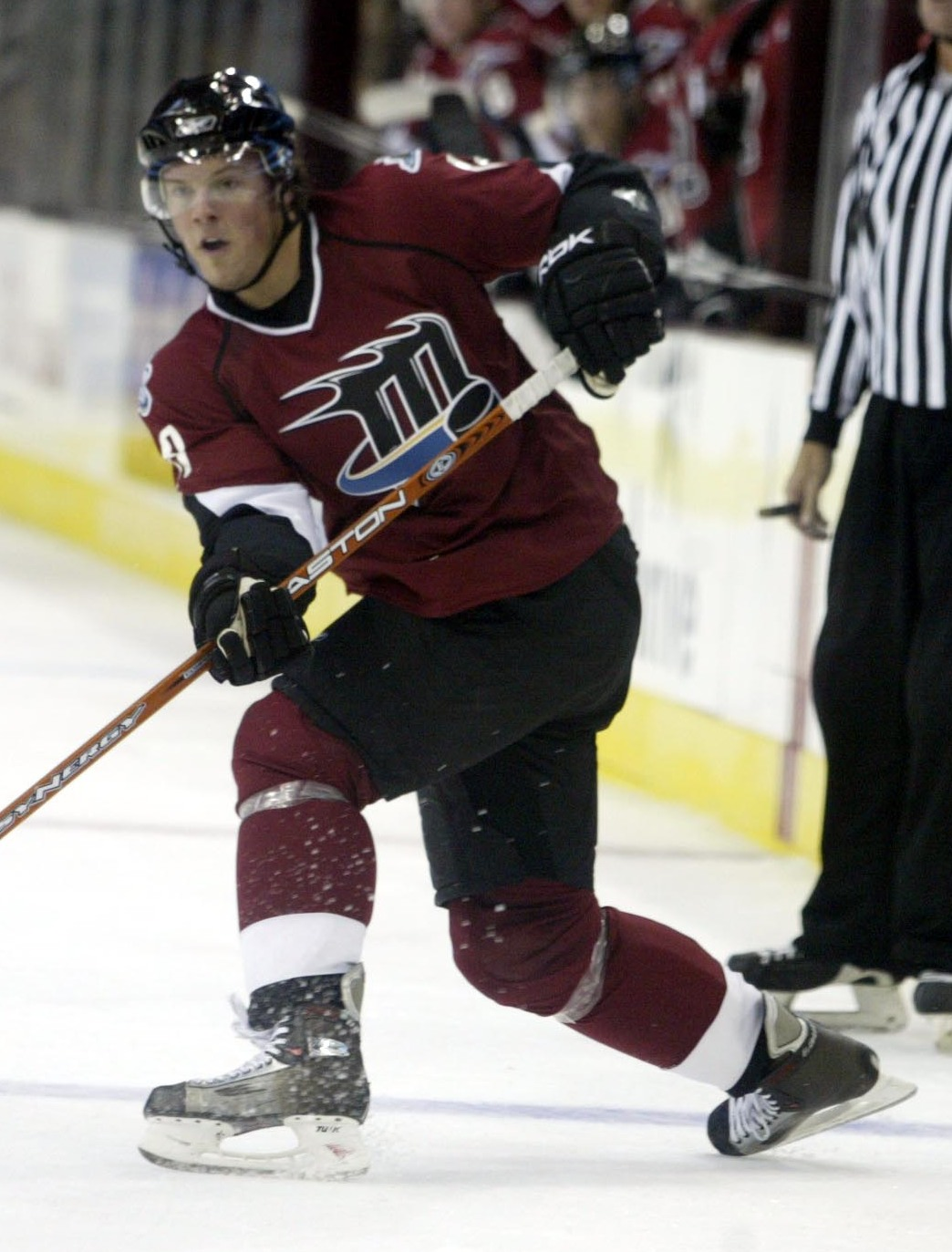
- Jillson with the Lake Erie Monsters in 2007
- Born: July 24, 1980 (age 45) North Smithfield, Rhode Island, U.S.
- Height: 6 ft 3 in (191 cm)
- Weight: 225 lb (102 kg; 16 st 1 lb)
- Position: Defense
- Shot: Right
- Played for: San Jose Sharks; Boston Bruins; Buffalo Sabres; Eisbären Berlin; HC MVD; Lukko; HC Pardubice; KLH Chomutov
- National team: United States
- NHL draft: 14th overall, 1999; San Jose Sharks
- Playing career: 2001–2012

Jeffrey J. Jillson (born July 24, 1980) is an American former professional ice hockey player who played in the National Hockey League for the San Jose Sharks, Boston Bruins and the Buffalo Sabres.

== Playing career ==
Jillson was drafted 14th overall in the first round of the 1999 NHL entry draft by the San Jose Sharks.

Jillson played for Rhode Island high school power Mount Saint Charles Academy, before moving on to the University of Michigan. He signed with the Sharks at the conclusion of his junior season, but did not leave Michigan until he graduated from college with a business degree. He played in the American Hockey League for the Cleveland Barons before being called up to play for the Sharks.

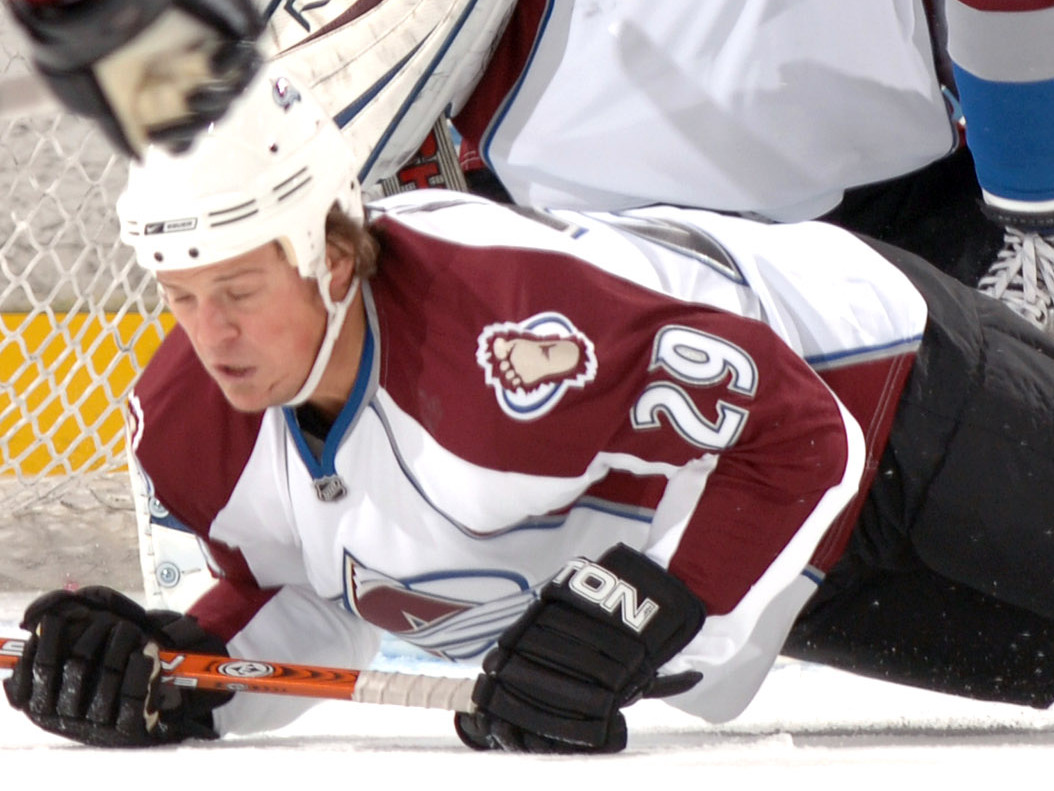
Jillson in an intra-squad scrimmage with the Colorado Avalanche in 2007

The Sharks traded Jillson to the Boston Bruins during the 2002–03 season, along with Jeff Hackett, for defenseman Kyle McLaren. He spent most of his season playing for the Providence Bruins. At the trade deadline of the 2003–04 season, he was involved in a three-way trade among the Bruins, Sharks, and Sabres. Jillson was sent back to the Sharks for Brad Boyes, then to the Sabres for Curtis Brown and Andy Delmore. He spent most of his time in the Sabres organization with their AHL affiliate, the Rochester Americans. He played sparingly for the Sabres, but was inserted into their lineup during the 2006 Stanley Cup Playoffs to fill one of the holes on their blueline created by injuries to Dmitri Kalinin, Teppo Numminen, and Henrik Tallinder.

After spending a season in Germany's Deutsche Eishockey Liga, Jillson signed with the Colorado Avalanche as a free-agent in 2007, but spent the entire season in the AHL with the Lake Erie Monsters and never played for the Avalanche. In 2008, Jillson signed with HC MVD of the Kontinental Hockey League, was later released, and signed with Lukko of the Finnish SM-liiga.

On October 1, 2009, Jillson signed a one-year contract with HC Pardubice of the Czech Extraliga. After an unproductive second season with Pardubice, Jillson chose to remain in the Czech Republic, dropping down a league to the 1. národní hokejová liga to sign a two-year contract with KLH Chomutov on June 27, 2011. Jillson scored 12 points in 52 games to contribute to Chomutov's promotion to the Czech Extraliga, despite the success he left his contract and was released as a free agent on May 1, 2012.

In 140 regular-season NHL games (as of the end of the 2005–06 season), Jillson recorded 9 goals and 32 assists, totalling 41 points.

== Personal ==
Jillson's younger brother, Nicholas, was killed in a house fire on February 6, 2010. In 2009, Jillson was the victim of a fraud case and was swindled out of $84,000 from the promises of motorcycle parts and a Mercedes. In July 2012, the conman was sentenced to 12 years imprisonment and as a result is now pursued in a civil case by Jillson.

== Career statistics ==
=== Regular season and playoffs ===
| | | | Regular season | | | | | Playoffs |
| Season | Team | League | GP | G | A | Pts | PIM | GP | G | A | Pts | PIM |
|---|---|---|---|---|---|---|---|---|---|---|---|---|
| 1995–96 | Mount Saint Charles Academy | HS-RI | 15 | 8 | 7 | 15 | 15 | 5 | 1 | 1 | 2 | 4 |
| 1996–97 | Mount Saint Charles Academy | HS-RI | 15 | 16 | 14 | 30 | 20 | 4 | 0 | 4 | 4 | 6 |
| 1997–98 | Mount Saint Charles Academy | HS-RI | 15 | 10 | 13 | 23 | 32 | 5 | 4 | 5 | 9 | 6 |
| 1998–99 | University of Michigan | CCHA | 38 | 5 | 19 | 24 | 71 | — | — | — | — | — |
| 1999–2000 | University of Michigan | CCHA | 38 | 8 | 26 | 34 | 115 | — | — | — | — | — |
| 2000–01 | University of Michigan | CCHA | 43 | 10 | 20 | 30 | 74 | — | — | — | — | — |
| 2001–02 | San Jose Sharks | NHL | 48 | 5 | 13 | 18 | 29 | 4 | 0 | 0 | 0 | 0 |
| 2001–02 | Cleveland Barons | AHL | 27 | 2 | 13 | 15 | 45 | — | — | — | — | — |
| 2002–03 | San Jose Sharks | NHL | 26 | 0 | 6 | 6 | 9 | — | — | — | — | — |
| 2002–03 | Cleveland Barons | AHL | 19 | 3 | 5 | 8 | 12 | — | — | — | — | — |
| 2002–03 | Providence Bruins | AHL | 30 | 4 | 11 | 15 | 26 | 4 | 0 | 2 | 2 | 8 |
| 2003–04 | Boston Bruins | NHL | 50 | 4 | 10 | 14 | 35 | — | — | — | — | — |
| 2003–04 | Buffalo Sabres | NHL | 14 | 0 | 3 | 3 | 19 | — | — | — | — | — |
| 2004–05 | Rochester Americans | AHL | 78 | 12 | 17 | 29 | 46 | 9 | 1 | 1 | 2 | 12 |
| 2005–06 | Rochester Americans | AHL | 73 | 10 | 20 | 30 | 94 | — | — | — | — | — |
| 2005–06 | Buffalo Sabres | NHL | 2 | 0 | 0 | 0 | 4 | 4 | 0 | 0 | 0 | 0 |
| 2006–07 | Eisbären Berlin | DEL | 30 | 2 | 9 | 11 | 48 | 1 | 0 | 0 | 0 | 2 |
| 2007–08 | Lake Erie Monsters | AHL | 70 | 3 | 19 | 22 | 46 | — | — | — | — | — |
| 2008–09 | HC MVD | KHL | 12 | 1 | 2 | 3 | 14 | — | — | — | — | — |
| 2008–09 | Lukko | SM-l | 30 | 2 | 7 | 9 | 20 | — | — | — | — | — |
| 2009–10 | HC Eaton Pardubice | ELH | 42 | 4 | 8 | 12 | 14 | 13 | 0 | 1 | 1 | 10 |
| 2010–11 | HC Eaton Pardubice | ELH | 47 | 0 | 3 | 3 | 20 | 9 | 1 | 0 | 1 | 6 |
| 2011–12 | Piráti Chomutov | CZE.2 | 52 | 4 | 8 | 12 | 24 | 15 | 0 | 2 | 2 | 6 |
| NHL totals | | | 140 | 9 | 32 | 41 | 96 | 8 | 0 | 0 | 0 | 0 |
| AHL totals | | | 297 | 34 | 85 | 119 | 269 | 13 | 1 | 3 | 4 | 20 |

=== International ===
Medal record

Representing United States

World Championships
| Bronze medal – third place | 2004 Prague | |

World Junior Championships
| Bronze medal – third place | 2000 Skellefteå | |

| Year | Team | Event | Result | GP | G | A | Pts | PIM |
|---|---|---|---|---|---|---|---|---|
| 1999 | United States | WJC | 8th | 6 | 0 | 0 | 0 | 6 |
| 2000 | United States | WJC | 4th | 7 | 0 | 0 | 0 | 4 |
| 2004 | United States | WC | 3rd place, bronze medalist(s) | 9 | 1 | 1 | 2 | 6 |
| Junior totals | | | | 13 | 0 | 0 | 0 | 10 |
| Senior totals | | | | 9 | 1 | 1 | 2 | 6 |

== Awards and honors ==
| Award | Year |
|---|---|
| All-CCHA Rookie Team | 1998-99 |
| All-CCHA First Team | 1999-00 |
| CCHA Best Offensive Defenseman | 1999-00 |
| AHCA West First-Team All-American | 1999-00 |
| All-CCHA First Team | 2000-01 |
| All-CCHA All-Academic Team | 2000-01 |
| AHCA West Second-Team All-American | 2000–01 |
| Czech Extraliga Masters on the League | 2009–10 |

Jillson was inducted into the Rhode Island Hockey Hall of Fame in 2023.

Awards and achievements
| Preceded by Brad Stuart | San Jose Sharks first-round draft pick 1999 | Succeeded by Marcel Goc |
| Preceded by Mike Jones | CCHA Best Offensive Defenseman; 1999-00 | Succeeded by Greg Zanon |
