= Chris McAlpine =

American ice hockey player

- Born: December 1, 1971 (age 54) Roseville, Minnesota, U.S.
- Height: 6 ft 1 in (185 cm)
- Weight: 215 lb (98 kg; 15 st 5 lb)
- Position: Defense
- Shot: Right
- Played for: New Jersey Devils; St. Louis Blues; Tampa Bay Lightning; Atlanta Thrashers; Chicago Blackhawks; Los Angeles Kings
- NHL draft: 137th overall, 1990; New Jersey Devils
- Playing career: 1994–2005

Christopher Walter McAlpine (born December 1, 1971) is an American former professional hockey player who played in the NHL with the New Jersey Devils, St. Louis Blues, Tampa Bay Lightning, Atlanta Thrashers, Chicago Blackhawks, and Los Angeles Kings. He played defense and shot right-handed.

== Playing career ==
McAlpine was drafted by the New Jersey Devils in the 7th round, 137th overall in the 1990 NHL Entry Draft. After being drafted he played for the University of Minnesota for 4 years, scoring 30 points in 36 games his final year there. He made his debut in the NHL during the 1994–1995 season when he split the year with the Devils and the Albany River Rats of the AHL. After one and a half years with the River Rats McAlpine was traded to the St. Louis Blues, where he played the majority of his NHL career.

The 1999–2000 season turned out to be a hectic one for McAlpine, as he played for the Blues, Tampa Bay Lightning, and Atlanta Thrashers. Following that season he played for the Chicago Blackhwaks for 2 years and then 21 games with the Los Angeles Kings during the 2002–03 season.

McAlpine won the Stanley Cup in 1995 with the New Jersey Devils. He retired after the 2004–05 season playing with the Cincinnati Mighty Ducks of the AHL. He is currently a player agent working in Minneapolis.

== Career statistics ==
			Regular season					Playoffs
Season	Team	League	GP	G	A	Pts	PIM	GP	G	A	Pts	PIM
1989–90	Roseville High	USHS	25	15	13	28	14	—	—	—	—	—
1990–91	University of Minnesota	WCHA	38	7	9	16	112	—	—	—	—	—
1991–92	University of Minnesota	WCHA	42	3	9	12	136	—	—	—	—	—
1992–93	University of Minnesota	WCHA	41	14	9	23	84	—	—	—	—	—
1993–94	University of Minnesota	WCHA	36	12	18	30	121	—	—	—	—	—
1994–95	Albany River Rats	AHL	48	4	18	22	49	—	—	—	—	—
1994–95	New Jersey Devils	NHL	24	0	3	3	17	—	—	—	—	—
1995–96	Albany River Rats	AHL	57	5	14	19	72	4	0	0	0	13
1996–97	Albany River Rats	AHL	44	1	9	10	48	—	—	—	—	—
1996–97	St. Louis Blues	NHL	15	0	0	0	24	4	0	1	1	0
1997–98	St. Louis Blues	NHL	54	3	7	10	36	10	0	0	0	16
1998–99	St. Louis Blues	NHL	51	1	1	2	50	13	0	0	0	2
1999–00	Worcester IceCats	AHL	10	1	4	5	4	—	—	—	—	—
1999–00	St. Louis Blues	NHL	21	1	1	2	14	—	—	—	—	—
1999–00	Detroit Vipers	IHL	8	0	0	0	6	—	—	—	—	—
1999–00	Tampa Bay Lightning	NHL	10	1	1	2	10	—	—	—	—	—
1999–00	Atlanta Thrashers	NHL	3	0	0	0	2	—	—	—	—	—
2000–01	Norfolk Admirals	AHL	13	4	7	11	6	—	—	—	—	—
2000–01	Chicago Blackhawks	NHL	50	0	6	6	32	—	—	—	—	—
2001–02	Norfolk Admirals	AHL	8	0	4	4	4	—	—	—	—	—
2001–02	Chicago Blackhawks	NHL	40	0	3	3	36	1	0	0	0	0
2002–03	Los Angeles Kings	NHL	21	0	2	2	24	—	—	—	—	—
2002–03	Manchester Monarchs	AHL	3	0	0	0	0	—	—	—	—	—
2004–05	Cincinnati Mighty Ducks	AHL	14	1	0	1	18	10	0	1	1	6
NHL totals			289	6	24	30	245	28	0	1	1	18

== Awards and honors ==
Award	Year
College
All-WCHA Rookie Team	1990–91
All-WCHA First Team	1993–94
AHCA West Second-Team All-American	1993–94
WCHA All-Tournament Team	1994

Awards and achievements
Preceded by Travis Richards	WCHA Most Valuable Player in Tournament; 1994	Succeeded by Kirk Daubenspeck
