= 2006–07 German ice hockey league season =

German ice hockey season 2006–07
- Nation
- Germany
- Levels
- DEL
- 2nd Bundesliga
- Oberliga
- Number of leagues
- 3
- Number of teams
- 41
- Champions
- Adler Mannheim

The DEL, 2nd Bundesliga and Oberliga are the first three levels of ice hockey in Germany. All three leagues operate nationwide. While the DEL is an independently operated league, the other two are run by the German ice hockey federation, the DEB, through the ESBG. The leagues below the Oberliga are operated by the state federations (German:Landesverbände) and don't run nationwide. The 2006–07 season for the three top leagues started on 7 September 2006 with the first round in the DEL and finished on 17 April 2007 with the third and last game of the DEL finals, with the Adler Mannheim winning their fifth DEL title.

== Champions ==
- DEL: Adler Mannheim
- 2nd Bundesliga: EHC Wolfsburg Grizzly Adams
- Oberliga: Heilbronner Falken

== Deutsche Eishockey Liga, the DEL ==
The DEL is the highest tier of German ice hockey. The league was played with 14 clubs in the 2006–07 season, the same number as the previous season. However, in place of the Kassel Huskies, who were relegated the previous season, the Straubing Tigers took part in the competition, having won the 2nd Bundesliga in 2005–06. The modus had slightly changed from the 2005–06 season. Each club played the other four times, resulting in 52 regular season games per club. The top six clubs at the end of the regular season are qualified for the first round of the play-offs. The clubs seven to ten play a preliminary round to determine the last two places for the first round. For the teams placed eleven to fourteen, the season had ended. No club was relegated from the DEL this season but one new club admitted, the EHC Wolfsburg Grizzly Adams, champion of the 2nd Bundesliga.

=== Final table ===
The final table operates under the following points system: Three points for a win, two for a win after overtime or penalties, one for a loss after overtime or penalties and no points for an outright loss.

Position	Name	P	Won	OTW	PW	OTL	PL	Lost	GF	GA	Points
1	Adler Mannheim	52	29	4	2	5	3	9	184	147	107
2	DEG Metro Stars	52	28	4	1	2	2	15	163	127	98
3	Sinupret Ice Tigers	52	26	4	4	1	0	17	181	136	95
4	Kölner Haie	52	28	1	1	2	4	16	180	146	94
5	ERC Ingolstadt	52	28	1	1	2	4	16	180	146	94
6	Hannover Scorpions	52	23	2	1	4	5	17	162	157	84
7	Hamburg Freezers	52	20	6	4	1	2	19	169	153	83
8	Frankfurt Lions	52	24	3	1	1	2	21	171	171	83
9	Eisbären Berlin (C)	52	22	1	1	3	4	21	171	157	77
10	Krefeld Pinguine	52	18	2	4	2	3	23	170	173	71
11	Iserlohn Roosters	52	18	2	4	1	3	24	148	163	70
12	Straubing Tigers (N)	52	12	4	4	3	1	28	135	189	56
13	Augsburger Panther	52	11	2	4	2	1	32	148	205	48
14	EV Duisburg	52	8	1	2	4	1	36	118	218	35

- Abbreviations: P = Games played, OTW = Overtime win, PW = Win after penalty shootout, OTL = Overtime loss, PL = Loss after penalty shoutout, GF = Goals for, GA = Goals against, (C) = Defending champion, (N) = New club
- Source:"DEL 2006–07". Official DEL website. Archived from the original on 20 October 2007.

=== Play-offs ===
The four rounds of the 2006–07 play-offs were played under the following system:

- Preliminary round: Best-of-three
- First round: Best-of-seven
- Semi finals: Best-of-five
- Finals: Best-of-five

Like the regular season, in the play-offs games will be decided by penalty shoot-outs (P) after a five-minute overtime (OT) sudden-death. In all play-off rounds the higher placed team from the regular season has home advantage in the uneven numbered games (Game 1, 3, 5, 7) and the other team in the even numbered games (Game 2, 4, 6).

==== Preliminary round ====
Team	Team	Game 1	Game 2	Game 3
Hamburg Freezers	Krefeld Pinguine	5–3	5–3	—
Frankfurt Lions	Eisbären Berlin	3–4	2–1	6–0

==== First round ====
Team	Team	Game 1	Game 2	Game 3	Game 4	Game 5	Game 6	Game 7
Adler Mannheim	Frankfurt Lions	4–3 OT	6–2	2–1	2–4	3–2	—	—
DEG Metro Stars	Hamburg Freezers	3–2	4–0	5–4 OT	1–3	6–1	—	—
Sinupret Ice Tigers	Hannover Scorpions	3–5	2–3	3–0	3–2	3–2 OT	3–2 OT	—
ERC Ingolstadt	Kölner Haie	1–5	1–4	6–2	0–1 OT	6–4	1–5	—

==== Semi finals ====
Team	Team	Game 1	Game 2	Game 3	Game 4	Game 5
Adler Mannheim	Kölner Haie	7–2	6–4	2–0	—	—
DEG Metro Stars	Sinupret Ice Tigers	2–3	3–4 P	5–4 OT	0–1	—

==== Finals ====
Team	Team	Game 1	Game 2	Game 3	Game 4	Game 5
Adler Mannheim	Sinupret Ice Tigers	3–2 OT	6–2	5–2	—	—

- The Adler Mannheim are the 2006–07 champions of the DEL.

=== Play-off tree ===
First round
1	Adler Mannheim	4
8	Frankfurt Lions	1
4	ERC Ingolstadt	4
5	Kölner Haie	1
2	DEG Metro Stars	4
7	Hamburg Freezers	2
3	Sinupret Ice Tigers	2
6	Hannover Scorpions	4

Semi final
1	Adler Mannheim	3
5	Kölner Haie	0
2	DEG Metro Stars	1
3	Sinupret Ice Tigers	3

Final
1	Adler Mannheim	3
3	Sinupret Ice Tigers	0

=== Top scorers ===
The five highest placed scores in the regular season and play-offs are:

==== Regular season ====
Player	Club	Games	Goals	Assists	Points
(Canada) David McLlwain	Kölner Haie	52	21	41	62
(Canada) François Fortier	Hamburg Freezers	52	28	31	59
(Canada) Brad Smyth	Hamburg Freezers	52	23	36	59
(Canada) François Méthot	Adler Mannheim	52	19	38	57
(Latvia) Herberts Vasiļjevs	Krefeld Pinguine	51	30	24	57

==== Play-offs ====
Player	Club	Games	Goals	Assists	Points
(Canada) Colin Forbes	Adler Mannheim	11	4	10	14
(Canada) Jame Pollock	Sinupret Ice Tigers	13	5	9	14
(Canada) David McLlwain	Kölner Haie	9	4	10	14
(Canada) Jason Jaspers	Adler Mannheim	11	6	7	13
(United States) Brian Swanson	Sinupret Ice Tigers	13	4	7	11

== 2nd Bundesliga ==
The 2nd Bundesliga is the second highest tier of ice hockey in Germany. The league played with 14 clubs in the 2006–07 season, the same number it had since 2001. Each club played each other four times during the regular season. The top eight teams in the league qualified for the play-offs to determined the 2nd Bundesliga champion who also gained promotion to the DEL this season. For the clubs placed nine and ten, the season has finished after the regular round. The bottom four clubs played out the two relegated teams from the 2nd Bundesliga.

=== Regular season ===
The final table operates under the following points system: Three points for a win, two for a win after overtime, one for a loss after overtime and no points for an outright loss.

Position	Name	P	Won	OTW	OTL	Lost	GF	GA	GD	Points
1	Kassel Huskies (R)	52	37	4	1	10	203	113	90	120
2	EHC Wolfsburg Grizzly Adams	52	32	3	5	12	209	142	67	107
3	REV Bremerhaven	52	28	4	3	17	203	149	54	95
4	Schwenninger Wild Wings	52	27	3	4	18	191	159	32	91
5	Landshut Cannibals	52	25	6	3	18	186	131	55	90
6	EHC München	52	23	6	5	18	176	157	19	86
7	ESC Moskitos Essen	52	24	4	2	22	206	204	2	82
8	Eisbären Regensburg	52	25	2	3	22	178	153	25	82
9	SC Bietigheim-Bissingen	52	21	5	8	18	156	149	7	81
10	EV Landsberg 2000 (N)	52	22	5	2	23	168	179	−11	78
11	Dresdner Eislöwen	52	22	3	4	23	162	174	−12	76
12	ETC Crimmitschau (N)	52	10	1	8	33	101	189	−88	40
13	ESV Kaufbeuren	52	6	5	4	37	131	255	−124	32
14	Lausitzer Füchse	52	7	4	3	38	106	222	−116	32

- Abbreviations: P = Games played, OTW = Overtime win, OTL = Overtime loss, GF = Goals for, GA = Goals against, GD = Goal difference, (R) = Club relegated from the DEL, (N) = New club

=== Play-offs ===
The three rounds of the 2006–07 play-offs were played under the following system:

- First round: Best-of-seven
- Semi finals: Best-of-five
- Finals: Best-of-five

In all play-off rounds the higher placed team from the regular season has home advantage in the uneven numbered games (Game 1, 3, 5, 7) and the other team in the even numbered games (Game 2, 4, 6). Should a game be undecided after regular time, there will be one overtime (OT) in sudden death format. Should there still be no winner, the game is decided through penalties (P).

==== First round ====
Team	Team	Game 1	Game 2	Game 3	Game 4	Game 5	Game 6	Game 7
Kassel Huskies	Eisbären Regensburg	5–2	5–4 OT	6–2	4–0	—	—	—
EHC Wolfsburg	ESC Moskitos Essen	6–4	5–0	9–4	4–2	—	—	—
REV Bremerhaven	EHC München	3–4	2–4	8–2	0–3	8–2	1–0	—
Schwenninger Wild Wings	Landshut Cannibals	3–4	2–3 OT	4–0	1–5	2–3	—	—

==== Semi finals ====
Team	Team	Game 1	Game 2	Game 3	Game 4	Game 5
Kassel Huskies	EHC München	7–3	3–0	7–1	—	—
EHC Wolfsburg	Landshut Cannibals	5–3	4–2	4–0	—	—

==== Finals ====
Team	Team	Game 1	Game 2	Game 3	Game 4	Game 5
Kassel Huskies	EHC Wolfsburg	0–1	2–3	1–2	—	—

- EHC Wolfsburg is the 2006–07 champion of the 2nd Bundesliga and promoted to the DEL.

=== Play-downs ===
The play downs consists of only one round, played in a best-of-seven format. The two loser of this round are relegated to the Oberliga.

Team	Team	Game 1	Game 2	Game 3	Game 4	Game 5	Game 6	Game 7
ESC Dresdner Eislöwen	Lausitzer Füchse	4–3	1–2 OT	0–1	2–1	1–2 P	1–3	—
ETC Crimmitschau	ESV Kaufbeuren	3–4 OT	2–5	5–2	0–3	3–1	2–1 OT	5–0

- ESC Dresdner Eislöwen and ESV Kaufbeuren are relegated.

=== Play-off tree ===
First round
1	Kassel Huskies	4
8	Eisbären Regensburg	0
3	REV Bremerhaven	2
6	EHC München	4
2	EHC Wolfsburg	4
7	ESC Moskitos Essen	0
4	Schwenninger Wild Wings	1
5	Landshut Cannibals	4

Semi final
1	Kassel Huskies	3
6	EHC München	0
2	EHC Wolfsburg	3
5	Landshut Cannibals	0

Final
1	Kassel Huskies	0
2	EHC Wolfsburg	3

== Oberliga ==
The Oberliga is the third tier of ice hockey in Germany and as such the lowest nationwide level, below it are currently the LEVs (Landesverbände). In the 2006–07 season the league played with 14 clubs. However, the Ratinger Ice Aliens were excluded from the competition on 16 November 2006 and all results involving the club canceled.

Each club in the league played each other club four times in the 2006–07 season. The top eight teams then took part in a best-of-seven play-off round to determined the two promoted teams to the 2nd Bundesliga. Because the EHC Wolfsburg was admitted to the DEL, a third Oberliga club was also promoted, this being the SC Riessersee which had been the best placed semi final loser. For the bottom five clubs, the league season was finished after the regular round, due to the expansion of the Oberliga no team was relegated. The teams placed nine to twelve played a cup qualification round however.

=== Regular season ===
Position	Name	P	Won	OTW	OTL	Lost	GF	GA	GD	Points
1	SC Riessersee	48	35	4	3	6	219	133	86	116
2	Heilbronner Falken	48	34	3	0	11	251	139	112	108
3	Tölzer Löwen (R)	48	33	2	0	13	213	129	84	103
4	EV Ravensburg	48	25	5	3	15	202	174	28	88
5	Hannover Indians	48	21	6	3	18	182	147	35	78
6	1. EV Weiden	48	21	5	5	17	188	182	6	78
7	EHC Freiburg (R)	48	21	3	5	19	188	190	−2	74
8	EC Peiting	48	18	3	3	24	155	193	−38	63
9	EV Füssen	48	18	2	2	26	172	220	−48	60
10	EHC Klostersee	48	15	2	9	22	195	245	−50	58
11	Starbulls Rosenheim	48	14	4	4	26	157	174	−17	54
12	Eisbären Juniors Berlin	48	6	4	4	34	130	211	−81	30
13	TEV Miesbach	48	6	2	4	36	146	261	−115	26

- Abbreviations: P = Games played, OTW = Overtime win, OTL = Overtime loss, GF = Goals for, GA = Goals against, GD = Goal difference, (R) Club relegated from the 2nd Bundesliga, (N) = New club

=== Play-offs ===
The Oberliga play-offs were operating on a best-of-seven modus in the first round and semi finals. The finals were played as best-of-three. The winning teams of the semi-finals are promoted to the 2nd Bundesliga.

==== First round ====
Team	Team	Game 1	Game 2	Game 3	Game 4	Game 5	Game 6	Game 7
SC Riessersee	EC Peiting	6–2	5–7	7–0	4–3 P	9–2	—	—
Heilbronner Falken	EHC Freiburg	5–2	4–1	4–1	5–2	—	—	—
Tölzer Löwen	1. EV Weiden	1–4	4–5 OT	4–1	5–1	4–2	1–3	8–3
EV Ravensburg	Hannover Indians	2–1	1–9	2–1 OT	4–3 P	4–2	—	—

==== Semi finals ====
Winners promoted to 2nd Bundesliga.

Team	Team	Game 1	Game 2	Game 3	Game 4	Game 5	Game 6	Game 7
SC Riessersee	EV Ravensburg	2–6	2–4	0–3	3–4 P	—	—	—
Heilbronner Falken	Tölzer Löwen	4–2	7–2	1–2 P	3–0	3–1	—	—

==== Finals ====
Team	Team	Game 1	Game 2	Game 3
Heilbronner Falken	EV Ravensburg	5–3	7–1	—

- Heilbronner Falken, EV Ravensburg and SC Riessersee are all promoted to the 2nd Bundesliga. Heilbronner Falken are the 2006–07 Oberliga champions.

=== Play-off tree ===
First round
1	SC Riessersee	4
8	EC Peiting	1
4	EV Ravensburg	4
5	Hannover Indians	1
2	Heilbronner Falken	4
7	EHC Freiburg	0
3	Tölzer Löwen	4
6	1. EV Weiden	3

Semi finals
1	SC Riessersee	0
4	EV Ravensburg	4
2	Heilbronner Falken	4
3	Tölzer Löwen	1

Finals
2	Heilbronner Falken	2
4	EV Ravensburg	0

== Leagues below the Oberliga ==
The levels below the Oberliga are not administrated by the DEB but rather by the local federations, the LEVs. With the ESBG's intention to increase the number of clubs in the Oberliga from 13 to 19, seven promotion places were available for the LEV clubs. The league champions and promoted clubs from the regional leagues were:

- Regionalliga West: Herner EG (champions, not promoted), Rote Teufel Bad Nauheim
- Regionalliga Nordost: Blue Lions Leipzig (champions), Rostocker EC, ESC 04 Halle, EHC Erfurt Black Dragons
- Bayernliga: EHF Passau Black Hawks (champions), Deggendorfer SC

=== Regionalliga West ===
The Regionalliga West is actually not quite a league but rather a promotion round. It contains the best six teams of the Regionalliga Nordrhein-Westfalen, and the top two teams of the Regionalliga Hessen and the Baden-Württemberg Liga each. The winner of this league is nominally promoted to the Oberliga. As such, the league covers the German states of Baden-Württemberg, Hessen, Saarland, Rheinland-Pfalz and Nordrhein-Westfalen.

=== Regionalliga Nordost ===
This league covers the north and north east of Germany. Again, it is more of a promotion round, compromising nine teams. In an effort to strengthen the sport in the east of Germany, four clubs from this region were promoted to the Oberliga. The Regionalliga Nordost covers the German states of Niedersachsen, Bremen, Hamburg, Schleswig-Holstein, Mecklenburg-Vorpommern, Berlin, Saxony-Anhalt, Saxony and Thuringia.

=== Bayernliga ===
The Bayernliga is the only single-state league of the three, covering just Bavaria. The reason for this is that the state holds approximately one third of all ice hockey clubs in Germany and 17 of the 41 clubs in the first three divisions in 2006–07 were from this federation.

- Source:"Championnat d'Allemagne 2006/07 (in French)". Hockeyarchives. Archived from the original on 13 May 2008.

== Sources ==
- Hockey Archives – International ice hockey website with tables and results (in French)
- Official website of the ESBG for the 2nd Bundesliga and Oberliga (in German)
- Official DEL website (in German)
