= 1993–94 NCAA Division I men's ice hockey season =

- Duration: October 1993– April 2, 1994
- NCAA tournament: 1994
- National championship: Saint Paul Civic Center; Saint Paul, Minnesota
- NCAA champion: Lake Superior State
- Hobey Baker Award: Chris Marinucci (Minnesota–Duluth)

The 1993–94 NCAA Division I men's ice hockey season began in October 1993 and concluded with the 1994 NCAA Division I men's ice hockey tournament's championship game on April 2, 1994, at the Saint Paul Civic Center in Saint Paul, Minnesota. This was the 47th season in which an NCAA ice hockey championship was held and is the 100th year overall where an NCAA school fielded a team.

== Season Outlook ==
=== Pre-season polls ===
The top teams in the nation as ranked before the start of the season.

The WMPL poll was voted on by coaches. The WMEB was voted on by media. The College Hockey USA Poll was voted on by coaches. The Record poll was voted on by coaches, media, and NHL scouts.

Tim Leonard of The Record newspaper in Troy, New York started a poll in absence of the Times Union poll. The Record's poll was voted on by coaches, media, and NHL scouts.

WMPL Poll
Rank	Team
1	Lake Superior State (9)
2	Wisconsin
3	Maine (1)
4	Boston University
5	Michigan
6	Rensselaer
7	Michigan State
8	Michigan Tech
9	Northern Michigan
10	Harvard

WMEB Poll
Rank	Team
1	Lake Superior State (10)
2	Wisconsin (3)
3	Boston University (3)
4	Maine
5	Rensselaer
6	Miami
7	Michigan
8	Michigan State
9	Harvard
10	Minnesota

College Hockey USA Poll
Rank	Team
1	Lake Superior State
2	Wisconsin
3	Boston University
4	Maine
5	Rensselaer
6	Miami
7	Michigan
8	Minnesota
9	Harvard
10	Michigan State

The Record Poll
Rank	Team
1	Lake Superior State (18)
2	Boston University
3	Wisconsin (2)
4	Maine (6)
5	Rensselaer (1)
6	Michigan
7	Michigan State
8	Michigan Tech
9	Harvard
10	Clarkson

== Regular season ==
=== Season tournaments ===
Tournament	Dates	Teams	Champion
Great Alaska Face–Off	November 25–27	4	Lake Superior State
College Hockey Showcase	November 26–27	4	
Dexter Shoe Classic	November 26–27	4	Rensselaer
National Capital Hockey Tournament	November 26–27	4	Merrimack
Great Western Freeze–Out	November 27–28	4	Miami
Badger Showdown	December 28–29	4	Wisconsin
Denver Cup	December 28–29	4	Denver
Cleveland College Hockey Classic	December 29–30	4	Colorado College
Great Lakes Invitational	December 29–30	4	Michigan
Rensselaer Holiday Tournament	December 29–30	4	Rensselaer
Sheraton/USAir Hockey Classic	December 29–30	4	New Hampshire
Syracuse Invitational	December 29–30	4	Northeastern
Mariucci Classic	December 31–January 2	4	Lake Superior State
Beanpot	February 7, 14	4	Boston College

=== Standings ===
1993–94 Central Collegiate Hockey Association standings
	Conference							Overall					
	GP	W	L	T	PTS	GF	GA	GP	W	L	T	GF	GA
Michigan†*	30	24	5	1	49	146	80	41	33	7	1	205	112
Lake Superior State	30	18	8	4	40	129	69	45	31	10	4	198	103
Michigan State	30	17	8	5	39	115	87	41	23	13	5	155	123
Western Michigan	30	18	10	2	38	117	101	40	24	13	3	165	134
Miami	30	17	12	1	35	112	94	38	21	16	1	137	120
Bowling Green	30	15	13	2	32	114	105	38	19	17	2	149	132
Ferris State	30	12	17	1	25	110	122	38	14	23	1	205	247
Notre Dame	30	9	16	5	23	85	121	38	11	22	5	113	165
Illinois-Chicago	30	8	20	2	18	101	144	39	11	26	2	135	192
Ohio State	30	6	19	5	17	81	124	35	7	23	5	98	158
Kent State	30	6	22	2	14	109	172	39	11	26	2	151	219
Alaska-Fairbanks^								38	24	13	1	223	152
Championship: Michigan † indicates conference regular season champion * indicates conference tournament champion^ Alaska-Fairbanks is an affiliate member and its games do not count towards the conference standings

1993–94 ECAC Hockey standings
	Conference							Overall					
	GP	W	L	T	PTS	GF	GA	GP	W	L	T	GF	GA
Harvard†*	22	16	2	4	36	107	60	33	24	5	4	155	89
Clarkson	22	13	5	4	30	92	67	34	20	9	5	147	114
Rensselaer	22	12	6	4	28	99	75	36	21	11	4	171	115
Brown	22	12	7	3	27	91	73	32	15	13	4	116	117
Vermont	22	10	6	6	26	86	75	33	15	12	6	127	113
Union	22	10	9	3	23	83	89	30	15	11	4	117	118
Colgate	22	10	10	2	22	97	90	33	14	17	2	144	137
Cornell	22	7	10	5	19	73	89	30	8	17	5	97	126
Princeton	22	7	12	3	17	63	80	28	10	15	3	88	101
St. Lawrence	22	8	14	0	16	74	95	31	10	21	0	99	134
Yale	22	5	16	1	11	58	102	27	5	21	1	73	133
Dartmouth	22	4	17	1	9	80	111	27	5	21	1	94	137
Championship: Harvard † indicates conference regular season champion * indicates conference tournament champion (Whitelaw Cup)

1993–94 Hockey East standings
	Conference							Overall					
	GP	W	L	T	PTS	GF	GA	GP	W	L	T	GF	GA
Boston University†*	24	21	3	0	42	120	63	41	34	7	0	195	113
Massachusetts–Lowell	24	14	6	4	32	91	91	40	25	10	5	164	120
New Hampshire	24	13	9	2	28	90	91	40	25	12	3	145	125
Northeastern	24	10	8	6	26	94	95	39	19	13	7	162	159
Providence	24	9	13	2	20	74	111	36	14	19	3	120	149
Boston College	24	7	12	5	19	85	96	35	15	16	5	145	133
Merrimack	24	8	14	2	18	77	110	37	16	19	2	126	152
Maine^	24	3	20	1	7	92	130	36	6	29	1	142	130
Championship: Boston University † indicates conference regular season champion * indicates conference tournament champion^ Towards the end of the season Maine was required to retroactively forfeit 14 games for using a player deemed ineligible by the NCAA

1993–94 NCAA Division I Independent ice hockey standings
	Conference							Overall					
	GP	W	L	T	PTS	GF	GA	GP	W	L	T	GF	GA
Air Force	0	0	0	0	-	-	-	32	15	16	1	121	139
Army	0	0	0	0	-	-	-	30	14	16	0	123	121
Massachusetts	0	0	0	0	-	-	-	29	20	9	0	177	94

1993–94 Western Collegiate Hockey Association standings
	Conference							Overall					
	GP	W	L	T	PTS	GF	GA	GP	W	L	T	GF	GA
Colorado College†	32	18	9	5	41	135	126	39	23	11	5	163	138
Minnesota*	32	18	10	4	40	111	109	42	25	13	4	151	142
Wisconsin	32	19	12	1	39	128	103	42	26	15	1	172	133
St. Cloud State	32	16	12	4	36	127	111	38	21	13	4	160	135
Northern Michigan	32	17	14	1	35	129	120	39	22	16	1	157	140
Alaska-Anchorage	32	14	16	2	30	110	109	36	15	19	2	123	132
Minnesota-Duluth	32	12	17	3	27	125	131	38	14	21	3	144	160
North Dakota	32	11	17	4	26	101	131	38	11	23	4	119	164
Denver	32	11	18	3	25	116	130	38	15	20	3	146	155
Michigan Tech	32	8	19	5	21	93	105	45	13	27	5	135	163
Championship: Minnesota † indicates conference regular season champion * indicates conference tournament champion

=== Final regular season polls ===
The WMPL poll was released before the conference tournaments. The WMEB and The Record polls were released before the conference tournament finals.

WMPL Coaches Poll
Ranking	Team
1	Boston University (7)
2	Michigan (2)
3	Harvard
4	Lake Superior State (1)
5	Colorado College
6	Minnesota
7	Michigan State
8	Massachusetts Lowell
9	Wisconsin
10	Western Michigan

WMEB Media Poll
Ranking	Team
1	Boston University (14)
2	Michigan
3	Harvard
4	Lake Superior State
5	Colorado College
6	Massachusetts Lowell
7	Minnesota
8	Wisconsin
9	Western Michigan
10	Michigan State

The Record Poll
Ranking	Team
1	Boston University (20)
2	Michigan (3)
3	Harvard (2)
4	Lake Superior State (2)
5	Minnesota
6	Wisconsin
7	Massachusetts Lowell
8	Colorado College
9	Michigan State
10	Clarkson

== 1994 NCAA tournament ==
Regional Quarterfinals; March 25–26
E1	Boston University	–
–	bye	–
East Regional
E4	Wisconsin	6
E5	Western Michigan	3
W2	Minnesota	–
–	bye	–
West Regional
W3	Massachusetts-Lowell	4
W6	Michigan State	3
W1	Michigan	–
–	bye	–
West Regional
W4	Lake Superior State	6*
W5	Northeastern	5
E2	Harvard	–
–	bye	–
East Regional
E3	New Hampshire	2
E6	Rensselaer	0

Regional semifinals March 26–27
E1	Boston University	6
E4	Wisconsin	2
W2	Minnesota	2*
W3	Massachusetts-Lowell	1
W1	Michigan	4
W4	Lake Superior State	5*
E2	Harvard	7
E3	New Hampshire	1

Frozen Four; March 31
E1	Boston University	4
W2	Minnesota	1
W4	Lake Superior State	3*
E2	Harvard	2

National championship April 2
E1	Boston University	1
W4	Lake Superior State	9

Note: * denotes overtime period(s)

== Player stats ==
=== Scoring leaders ===
The following players led the league in points at the conclusion of the season.

GP = Games played; G = Goals; A = Assists; Pts = Points; PIM = Penalty minutes

Player	Class	Team	GP	G	A	Pts	PIM
Dean Fedorchuk	Senior	Alaska-Fairbanks	38	42	32	74	88
Tavis MacMillan	Senior	Alaska-Fairbanks	38	23	51	74	66
Steve Guolla	Junior	Michigan State	41	23	46	69	16
Brian Wiseman	Senior	Michigan	40	19	50	69	44
David Oliver	Senior	Michigan	41	28	40	68	16
Craig Conroy	Senior	Clarkson	34	26	39	65	46
Kelly Fairchild	Senior	Wisconsin	42	20	44	64	81
Andrew Shier	Senior	Wisconsin	42	17	45	62	76
Chris Marinucci	Senior	Minnesota–Duluth	38	30	31	61	65
Steve Martins	Junior	Harvard	32	25	35	60	93
Don Lester	Senior	Alaska-Fairbanks	38	19	41	60	32

=== Leading goaltenders ===
The following goaltenders led the league in goals against average at the end of the regular season while playing at least 33% of their team's total minutes.

GP = Games played; Min = Minutes played; W = Wins; L = Losses; OT = Overtime/shootout losses; GA = Goals against; SO = Shutouts; SV% = Save percentage; GAA = Goals against average

Player	Class	Team	GP	Min	W	L	OT	GA	SO	SV%	GAA
Blaine Lacher	Junior	Lake Superior State	30	1785	20	5	4	59	6	.918	1.98
Derek Herlofsky	Junior	Boston University	20	1056	15	3	0	44	4	.909	2.50
Steve Shields	Senior	Michigan	36	1961	28	6	1	87	0	.892	2.66
Mike Buzak	Junior	Michigan State	39	2297	21	12	5	104	2	.903	2.72
Dwayne Roloson	Senior	Massachusetts-Lowell	40	2305	23	10	7	106	2	.909	2.76
Craig Brown	Senior	Western Michigan	24		14	5	2			.907	2.86
J. P. McKersie	Junior	Boston University	24	1325	19	4	0	64	0		2.90
Richard Shulmistra	Senior	Miami	27	1521	13	12	1	74	0	.892	2.92
Dave Kilduff	Freshman	Massachusetts	20	1088	14	4	0	52	2	.866	2.93
Trent Cavicchi	Sophomore	New Hampshire	25	1324	14	7	1	65	1	.896	2.95

== Awards ==
=== NCAA ===
Award		Recipient
Hobey Baker Memorial Award		Chris Marinucci, Minnesota–Duluth
Spencer Penrose Award		Don Lucia, Colorado College
Most Outstanding Player in NCAA Tournament		Sean Tallaire, Lake Superior State
AHCA All-American Teams
East First Team	Position	West First Team
Dwayne Roloson, Massachusetts-Lowell	G	Jamie Ram, Michigan Tech
Brian Mueller, Clarkson	D	Shawn Reid, Colorado College
Sean McCann, Harvard	D	John Gruden, Ferris State
Mike Pomichter, Boston University	F	David Oliver, Michigan
Craig Conroy, Clarkson	F	Brian Wiseman, Michigan
Steve Martins, Harvard	F	Chris Marinucci, Minnesota–Duluth
East Second Team	Position	West Second Team
J. P. McKersie, Boston University	G	Steve Shields, Michigan
Rich Brennan, Boston University	D	Jeff Wells, Bowling Green
Derek Maguire, Harvard	D	Chris McAlpine, Minnesota
Jacques Joubert, Boston University	F	Dean Fedorchuk, Alaska-Fairbanks
Shane Henry, Massachusetts-Lowell	F	Clayton Beddoes, Lake Superior State
Chad Quenneville, Providence	F	Steve Guolla, Michigan State

=== CCHA ===
Awards		Recipient
Player of the Year		David Oliver, Michigan
Best Defensive Forward		Mike Stone, Michigan
Best Defensive Defenseman		Brent Brekke, Western Michigan
Best Offensive Defenseman		John Gruden, Ferris State
Rookie of the Year		Brendan Morrison, Michigan
Coach of the Year		Red Berenson, Michigan
Terry Flanagan Memorial Award		Craig Lisko, Ferris State
Most Valuable Player in Tournament		Mike Stone, Michigan
All-CCHA Teams
First Team	Position	Second Team
Steve Shields, Michigan	G	Mike Buzak, Michigan State
John Gruden, Ferris State	D	Bob Marshall, Miami
Jeff Wells, Bowling Green	D	Keith Aldridge, Lake Superior State
David Oliver, Michigan	F	Steve Guolla, Michigan State
Brian Wiseman, Michigan	F	Mike Knuble, Michigan
Anson Carter, Michigan State	F	Clayton Beddoes, Lake Superior State
Rookie Team	Position	
Bob Petrie, Bowling Green	G	
Andy Roach, Ferris State	D	
Harold Schock, Michigan	D	
Blake Sloan, Michigan	D	
Jason Botterill, Michigan	F	
Curtis Fry, Bowling Green	F	
Brendan Morrison, Michigan	F	

=== ECAC ===
Award		Recipient
Player of the Year		Steve Martins, Harvard
Rookie of the Year		Éric Perrin, Vermont
Coach of the Year		Bruce Delventhal, Union
Best Defensive Defenseman		Mike Traggio, Brown
Best Defensive Forward		Ian Sharp, Princeton
Most Outstanding Player in Tournament		Sean McCann, Harvard
All-ECAC Hockey Teams
First Team	Position	Second Team
Geoff Finch, Brown	G	Jason Currie, Clarkson
Sean McCann, Harvard	D	Sean O'Brien, Princeton
Brian Mueller, Clarkson	D	Derek Maguire, Harvard
Craig Conroy, Clarkson	F	Ron Pasco, Rensselaer
Brian Farrell, Harvard	F	Chris Kaban, Brown
Steve Martins, Harvard	F	Bruce Gardiner, Colgate
Rookie Team	Position	
Tim Thomas, Vermont	G	
Troy Creurer, St. Lawrence	D	
Ashlin Halfnight, Harvard	D	
Adam Wiesel, Clarkson	D	
Steve Wilson, Cornell	D	
Vince Auger, Cornell	F	
Chris Ford, Union	F	
Mike Harder, Colgate	F	
Jean-Francois Houle, Clarkson	F	
Éric Perrin, Vermont	F	
Martin St. Louis, Vermont	F	
Troy Stevens, Union	F	

=== Hockey East ===
Award		Recipient
Player of the Year		Dwayne Roloson, Massachusetts-Lowell
Rookie of the Year		Greg Bullock, Massachusetts-Lowell
Bob Kullen Coach of the Year Award		Bruce Crowder, Massachusetts-Lowell
Len Ceglarski Sportsmanship Award		Michael Spalla, Boston College
William Flynn Tournament Most Valuable Player		Dwayne Roloson, Massachusetts-Lowell
All-Hockey East Teams
First Team	Position	Second Team
Dwayne Roloson, Massachusetts-Lowell	G	Derek Herlofsky, Boston University
Rich Brennan, Boston University	D	Scott Malone, Boston University
François Bouchard, Northeastern	D	Michael Spalla, Northeastern
Shane Henry, Massachusetts-Lowell	F	Jean-Francois Aube, Massachusetts-Lowell
Jacques Joubert, Boston University	F	Mike Latendresse, Boston University
Mike Taylor, Northeastern	F	Greg Bullock, Massachusetts-Lowell
Rookie Team	Position	
Greg Taylor, Boston College	G	
John Jakopin, Merrimack	D	
Tim Murray, New Hampshire	D	
Shawn Bates, Boston University	F	
Eric Boguniecki, New Hampshire	F	
Greg Bullock, Massachusetts-Lowell	F	

=== WCHA ===
Award		Recipient
Player of the Year		Chris Marinucci, Minnesota-Duluth
Rookie of the Year		Landon Wilson, North Dakota
Student-Athlete of the Year		Brian Konowalchuk, Denver
		Jeff Nielsen, Minnesota
Coach of the Year		Don Lucia, Colorado College
Most Valuable Player in Tournament		Chris McAlpine, Minnesota
All-WCHA Teams
First Team	Position	Second Team
Jamie Ram, Michigan Tech	G	Lee Schill, Alaska-Anchorage
Chris McAlpine, Minnesota	D	Kelly Hultgren, St. Cloud State
Shawn Reid, Colorado College	D	Kent Fearns, Colorado College
Jay McNeill, Colorado College	F	Mike Harding, Northern Michigan
Kelly Fairchild, Wisconsin	F	Jeff Nielsen, Minnesota
Chris Marinucci, Minnesota-Duluth	F	Andrew Shier, Wisconsin
Rookie Team	Position	
Toby Kvalevog, North Dakota	G	
Todd Bethard, Alaska-Anchorage	D	
Eric Rud, Colorado College	D	
Brad Federenko, Minnesota-Duluth	F	
Landon Wilson, North Dakota	F	
Dean Seymour, Northern Michigan	F	

== 1994 NHL entry draft ==
Round	Pick	Player	College	Conference	NHL team
1	20	Jason Botterill	Michigan	CCHA	Dallas Stars
1	22	Jeff Kealty ^{†}	Boston University	Hockey East	Quebec Nordiques
2	32	Mike Watt ^{†}	Michigan State	CCHA	Edmonton Oilers
2	36	Ryan Johnson ^{†}	North Dakota	WCHA	Florida Panthers
2	39	Robb Gordon ^{†}	Michigan	CCHA	Vancouver Canucks
3	72	Chris Drury ^{†}	Boston University	Hockey East	Quebec Nordiques
3	73	Greg Crozier ^{†}	Michigan	CCHA	Pittsburgh Penguins
3	77	Chris Clark ^{†}	Clarkson	ECAC Hockey	Calgary Flames
4	79	Adam Copeland ^{†}	Miami	CCHA	Edmonton Oilers
4	81	Bryan Masotta ^{†}	Rensselaer	ECAC Hockey	Ottawa Senators
4	93	Matt Herr ^{†}	Michigan	CCHA	Washington Capitals
4	94	Tyler Harlton ^{†}	Michigan State	CCHA	St. Louis Blues
4	99	Eric Nickulas ^{†}	New Hampshire	Hockey East	Boston Bruins
4	102	Tom O'Connor ^{†}	Massachusetts	Independent	Pittsburgh Penguins
5	110	Jon Gaskins ^{†}	Michigan State	CCHA	Edmonton Oilers
5	113	Tony Tuzzolino	Michigan State	CCHA	Quebec Nordiques
5	115	Brian Swanson ^{†}	Colorado College	WCHA	San Jose Sharks
5	116	Albie O'Connell ^{†}	Boston University	Hockey East	New York Islanders
5	124	Marty Turco ^{†}	Michigan	CCHA	Dallas Stars
5	127	Doug Battaglia ^{†}	Rensselaer	ECAC Hockey	Detroit Red Wings
5	128	Clint Johnson ^{†}	Minnesota	WCHA	Pittsburgh Penguins
6	131	Mike Gaffney ^{†}	Massachusetts	Independent	Ottawa Senators
6	132	Bates Battaglia ^{†}	Lake Superior State	CCHA	Mighty Ducks of Anaheim
6	134	Ryan Smart ^{†}	Cornell	ECAC Hockey	New Jersey Devils
6	136	Terry Marchant ^{†}	Lake Superior State	CCHA	Edmonton Oilers
6	137	Dan Juden ^{†}	Massachusetts	Independent	Tampa Bay Lightning
6	139	Nick Windsor ^{†}	Clarkson	ECAC Hockey	Quebec Nordiques
6	142	Jason Stewart ^{†}	St. Cloud State	WCHA	New York Islanders
6	148	Joel Irving ^{†}	Western Michigan	CCHA	Montreal Canadiens
6	155	Luciano Caravaggio	Michigan Tech	WCHA	New Jersey Devils
7	158	Rocky Welsing ^{†}	Northern Michigan	WCHA	Mighty Ducks of Anaheim
7	159	Doug Sproule ^{†}	Harvard	ECAC Hockey	Ottawa Senators
7	160	Curtis Sheptak ^{†}	Northern Michigan	WCHA	Edmonton Oilers
7	165	Calvin Elfring ^{†}	Colorado College	WCHA	Quebec Nordiques
8	184	Brad Englehart ^{†}	Wisconsin	WCHA	Mighty Ducks of Anaheim
8	188	Jason Reid ^{†}	Vermont	ECAC Hockey	Edmonton Oilers
8	197	Chris Patrick ^{†}	Princeton	ECAC Hockey	Washington Capitals
8	198	Steve Noble ^{†}	Notre Dame	CCHA	St. Louis Blues
8	202	Raymond Giroux ^{†}	Yale	ECAC Hockey	Philadelphia Flyers
8	205	Jason Elliott ^{†}	Cornell	ECAC Hockey	Detroit Red Wings
8	208	Craig Anderson ^{†}	Wisconsin	WCHA	New York Rangers
9	213	Ashlin Halfnight	Harvard	ECAC Hockey	Hartford Whalers
9	217	Tim Thomas	Vermont	ECAC Hockey	Quebec Nordiques
9	221	Bill Muckalt ^{†}	Michigan	CCHA	Vancouver Canucks
9	223	John Tuohy ^{†}	Providence	Hockey East	Washington Capitals
9	229	John Grahame ^{†}	Lake Superior State	CCHA	Boston Bruins
9	231	Jeff Mikesch	Michigan Tech	WCHA	Detroit Red Wings
9	232	Jason Godbout ^{†}	Minnesota	WCHA	Pittsburgh Penguins
10	237	Steve MacKinnon ^{†}	Massachusetts	Independent	Ottawa Senators
10	238	Mike Mader ^{†}	Providence	Hockey East	Winnipeg Jets
10	239	Brian Regan ^{†}	Massachusetts	Independent	Hartford Whalers
10	245	Aniket Dhadphale ^{†}	Notre Dame	CCHA	San Jose Sharks
10	252	Chris Aldous ^{†}	Rensselaer	ECAC Hockey	Montreal Canadiens
10	253	Mike Peluso ^{†}	Minnesota–Duluth	WCHA	Calgary Flames
10	254	Jimmy Roy	Michigan Tech	WCHA	Dallas Stars
10	259	Scott Swanjord ^{†}	Providence	Hockey East	New Jersey Devils
11	263	Rob Mara ^{†}	Colgate	ECAC Hockey	Chicago Blackhawks
11	268	Brian White ^{†}	Maine	Hockey East	Tampa Bay Lightning
11	276	Scott Fankhouser ^{†}	Massachusetts–Lowell	Hockey East	St. Louis Blues
11	282	Doug Nolan ^{†}	Massachusetts–Lowell	Hockey East	Toronto Maple Leafs
11	284	Brian Leitza ^{†}	St. Cloud State	WCHA	Pittsburgh Penguins

† incoming freshman

== See also ==
- 1993–94 NCAA Division II men's ice hockey season
- 1993–94 NCAA Division III men's ice hockey season
