= David Oliver (ice hockey) =

Canadian ice hockey player

Dave Oliver
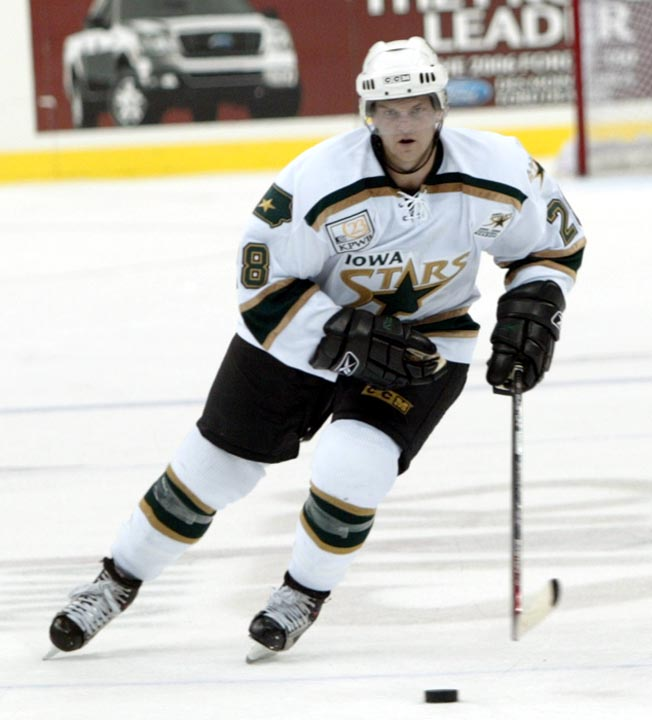
- Oliver with the Iowa Stars in 2005
- Born: April 17, 1971 (age 55) Sechelt, British Columbia, Canada
- Height: 6 ft 0 in (183 cm)
- Weight: 195 lb (88 kg; 13 st 13 lb)
- Position: Right wing
- Shot: Right
- Played for: NHL; Edmonton Oilers; New York Rangers; Ottawa Senators; Phoenix Coyotes; Ottawa Senators; Dallas Stars; AHL; Cape Breton Oilers; Utah Grizzlies; Iowa Stars; IHL; Houston Aeros; Grand Rapids Griffins; DEL; Munich Barons; BNL; Guildford Flames; Swe-1; Rögle BK
- Current NHL coach: New York Rangers (Assistant)
- NHL draft: 144th overall, 1991; Edmonton Oilers
- Playing career: 1994–2007

David Lee Oliver (born April 17, 1971) is a Canadian assistant coach for the New York Rangers of the National Hockey League (NHL) and a former professional ice hockey player who played several seasons in the NHL.

== Career ==
A graduate of the University of Michigan, Oliver began his NHL career with the Edmonton Oilers in 1994. He would also play with the New York Rangers, Ottawa Senators, Phoenix Coyotes and Dallas Stars.

Oliver has also played in the American Hockey League, International Hockey League, Germany's Deutsche Eishockey Liga, and the United Kingdom's British National League.

In 2007, Oliver joined the Colorado Avalanche where he worked for 11 seasons, serving as Director of Hockey Operations of the Lake Erie Monsters, Colorado's American Hockey League affiliate, an Assistant Coach with Lake Erie for two seasons and General Manager for three seasons. He also served as Colorado's Director of Player Development, a role which he held for six seasons. On July 17, 2018, the New York Rangers announced that Oliver would be joining David Quinn as an assistant coach for the team, along with Greg Brown.

== Career statistics ==
=== Regular season and playoffs ===
			Regular season					Playoffs
Season	Team	League	GP	G	A	Pts	PIM	GP	G	A	Pts	PIM
1988–89	Vernon Lakers	BCJHL	58	41	38	79	38	—	—	—	—	—
1989–90	Vernon Lakers	BCJHL	58	51	48	99	22	—	—	—	—	—
1990–91	University of Michigan	CCHA	27	13	11	24	34	—	—	—	—	—
1991–92	University of Michigan	CCHA	44	31	27	58	32	—	—	—	—	—
1992–93	University of Michigan	CCHA	40	35	20	55	18	—	—	—	—	—
1993–94	University of Michigan	CCHA	41	28	40	68	16	—	—	—	—	—
1994–95	Cape Breton Oilers	AHL	32	11	18	29	8	—	—	—	—	—
1994–95	Edmonton Oilers	NHL	44	16	14	30	20	—	—	—	—	—
1995–96	Edmonton Oilers	NHL	80	20	19	39	34	—	—	—	—	—
1996–97	Edmonton Oilers	NHL	17	1	2	3	4	—	—	—	—	—
1996–97	New York Rangers	NHL	14	2	1	3	4	3	0	0	0	0
1997–98	Houston Aeros	IHL	78	38	27	65	60	4	3	0	3	4
1998–99	Ottawa Senators	NHL	17	2	5	7	4	—	—	—	—	—
1998–99	Houston Aeros	IHL	37	18	17	35	30	19	10	6	16	22
1999–00	Houston Aeros	IHL	45	16	11	27	40	11	3	4	7	8
1999–00	Phoenix Coyotes	NHL	9	1	0	1	2	—	—	—	—	—
2000–01	Ottawa Senators	NHL	7	0	0	0	2	—	—	—	—	—
2000–01	Grand Rapids Griffins	IHL	51	14	17	31	35	10	6	2	8	8
2001–02	Munich Barons	DEL	59	20	14	34	30	9	2	2	4	6
2002–03	Dallas Stars	NHL	6	0	3	3	2	6	0	0	0	2
2002–03	Utah Grizzlies	AHL	37	11	14	25	14	—	—	—	—	—
2003–04	Dallas Stars	NHL	36	7	5	12	12	1	0	0	0	0
2003–04	Utah Grizzlies	AHL	31	5	12	17	12	—	—	—	—	—
2004–05	Guildford Flames	BNL	13	6	12	18	4	—	—	—	—	—
2005–06	Dallas Stars	NHL	3	0	0	0	0	—	—	—	—	—
2005–06	Iowa Stars	AHL	54	21	13	34	26	5	3	0	3	4
2006–07	Rögle BK	SWE-2	29	5	7	12	34	—	—	—	—	—
NHL totals			233	49	49	98	84	10	0	0	0	2

== Awards and honours ==
Award	Year
All-CCHA Rookie Team	1990–91
All-CCHA Second team	1992–93
All-CCHA First Team	1993–94
AHCA West First-Team All-American	1993–94

Awards and achievements
Preceded by Brian Savage	CCHA Player of the Year; 1993-94	Succeeded by Brian Holzinger
