= Greg Bullock =

Canadian ice hockey player (born 1973)

- Born: February 10, 1973 (age 53) Cambridge, Ontario, Canada
- Height: 5 ft 11 in (180 cm)
- Weight: 180 lb (82 kg; 12 st 12 lb)
- Position: Center
- Shot: Left
- Played for: Massachusetts–Lowell; San Francisco Spiders; St. John's Maple Leafs; Grand Rapids Griffins; Augsburger Panther; HC Fassa; Lowell Lock Monsters; Kansas City Blades; Michigan K-Wings; Manchester Storm; Bolzano HC; Idaho Steelheads; Straubing Tigers; Fresno Falcons; Corpus Christi Rayz; Motor City Mechanics; Port Huron Flags; Flint Generals; Brantford Blast
- Playing career: 1993–2014

Greg Bullock is a Canadian retired ice hockey center who was a two-time All-American for Massachusetts–Lowell.

== Career ==
Bullock began attending the University of Massachusetts Lowell in 1993 and immediately made an impact with the ice hockey team. Bullock led the Chiefs in scoring, helped the team post a Division I program record with 25 wins and was named Hockey East Rookie of the Year. Lowell reached the conference championship game for the first time and won its first game in the NCAA tournament since promotion to the top level. Bullock continued his high production as a sophomore, earning a spot on the All-American first team, but the results weren't there for the newly rechristened River Hawks. Lowell finished with a losing record and then suffered a greater loss when Bullock signed a professional contract after the year, ending his college career.

He debuted for the San Francisco Spiders the following year, putting up decent numbers as a rookie. The following year Bullock was nearly a point per game player for the St. John's Maple Leafs over the course of the entire season, but was unable to earn a callup to the parent club, Toronto Maple Leafs. After splitting his third pro season between two AAA clubs, Bullock headed to Europe for a time.

He returned after a stellar, though brief, performance with HC Fassa, but then bounced around between three teams before travelling to England. Bullock's globetrotting continued for several years but by 2004 he arrived in North America for good. Even then, however, he found himself on a new team every year until 2008 when he seemed to find a home with the Flint Generals. After being named team MVP and an alternate captain, Bullock's team got off to a horrendous start in 2009. Just 22 games into the season, Bullock was released from his contract and his professional career came to a close.

The next season he was back on the ice, however, this time playing for the Brantford Blast, a senior team near his hometown. He spent four years with the team, helping them win back-to-back J. Ross Robertson Cups before hanging up his skates in 2014.

== Statistics ==
=== Regular season and playoffs ===
			Regular Season					Playoffs
Season	Team	League	GP	G	A	Pts	PIM	GP	G	A	Pts	PIM
1989–90	Cambridge Winter Hawks	MWJHL	42	24	59	83	103	—	—	—	—	—
1992–93	Kitchener Dutchmen	MWJHL	13	7	12	19	22	—	—	—	—	—
1993–94	Massachusetts–Lowell	Hockey East	38	24	35	59	52	—	—	—	—	—
1994–95	Massachusetts–Lowell	Hockey East	40	25	40	65	125	—	—	—	—	—
1995–96	San Francisco Spiders	IHL	79	15	32	47	62	3	0	0	0	2
1996–97	St. John's Maple Leafs	AHL	75	21	52	73	65	11	2	6	8	17
1997–98	St. John's Maple Leafs	AHL	34	3	17	20	56	—	—	—	—	—
1997–98	Grand Rapids Griffins	IHL	35	9	19	28	58	3	0	1	1	4
1998–99	Augsburger Panther	DEL	48	10	10	20	22	4	0	0	0	12
1999–00	HC Fassa	Italy	10	15	20	35	18	—	—	—	—	—
1999–00	Lowell Lock Monsters	AHL	14	3	10	13	4	—	—	—	—	—
1999–00	Kansas City Blades	IHL	15	1	6	7	6	—	—	—	—	—
1999–00	Michigan K-Wings	IHL	25	5	12	17	18	—	—	—	—	—
2000–01	Manchester Storm	BISL	48	27	33	60	48	5	0	4	4	12
2001–02	Bolzano HC	Italy	36	16	31	47	48	—	—	—	—	—
2001–02	Idaho Steelheads	WCHL	8	3	5	8	12	15	2	7	9	26
2002–03	Straubing Tigers	Germany 2	54	22	45	67	131	3	0	2	2	20
2003–04	Fresno Falcons	ECHL	35	18	23	41	26	—	—	—	—	—
2003–04	Straubing Tigers	Germany 2	14	7	15	22	8	3	2	3	5	4
2004–05	Corpus Christi Rayz	CHL	52	17	49	66	24	—	—	—	—	—
2005–06	Motor City Mechanics	UHL	59	18	40	58	81	4	0	0	0	2
2006–07	Port Huron Flags	UHL	74	18	51	69	70	4	0	4	4	16
2007–08	Flint Generals	IHL	48	16	35	51	53	5	2	6	8	2
2008–09	Flint Generals	IHL	57	21	49	70	53	—	—	—	—	—
2009–10	Flint Generals	IHL	22	2	6	8	10	—	—	—	—	—
2010–11	Brantford Blast	MLH	21	15	14	29	6	6	2	5	7	0
2011–12	Brantford Blast	ACH	10	5	12	17	2	4	2	6	8	0
2012–13	Brantford Blast	MLH	16	12	15	27	4	1	0	0	0	0
2013–14	Brantford Blast	ACH	11	2	6	8	2	9	1	2	3	4
MWJHL totals			55	31	71	102	125	—	—	—	—	—
NCAA totals			78	49	75	124	177	—	—	—	—	—
AHL totals			123	27	79	106	125	11	2	6	8	17
IHL totals			154	30	69	99	144	6	0	1	1	6
Italy totals			46	31	51	82	66	—	—	—	—	—
Germany 2 totals			68	29	60	89	139	6	2	5	7	24
UHL (IHL) totals			260	75	181	256	266	13	2	10	12	20

== Awards and honors ==
Award	Year
Hockey East All-Rookie Team	1993–94
All-Hockey East Second Team	1993–94
Hockey East All-Tournament Team	1994
Hockey East All-Star	1994–95
AHCA East First-Team All-American	1994–95

Awards and achievements
Preceded by Paul Kariya	Hockey East Rookie of the Year; 1993–94	Succeeded by Mark Mowers
