= Eric Boguniecki =

American ice hockey player and coach (born 1975)

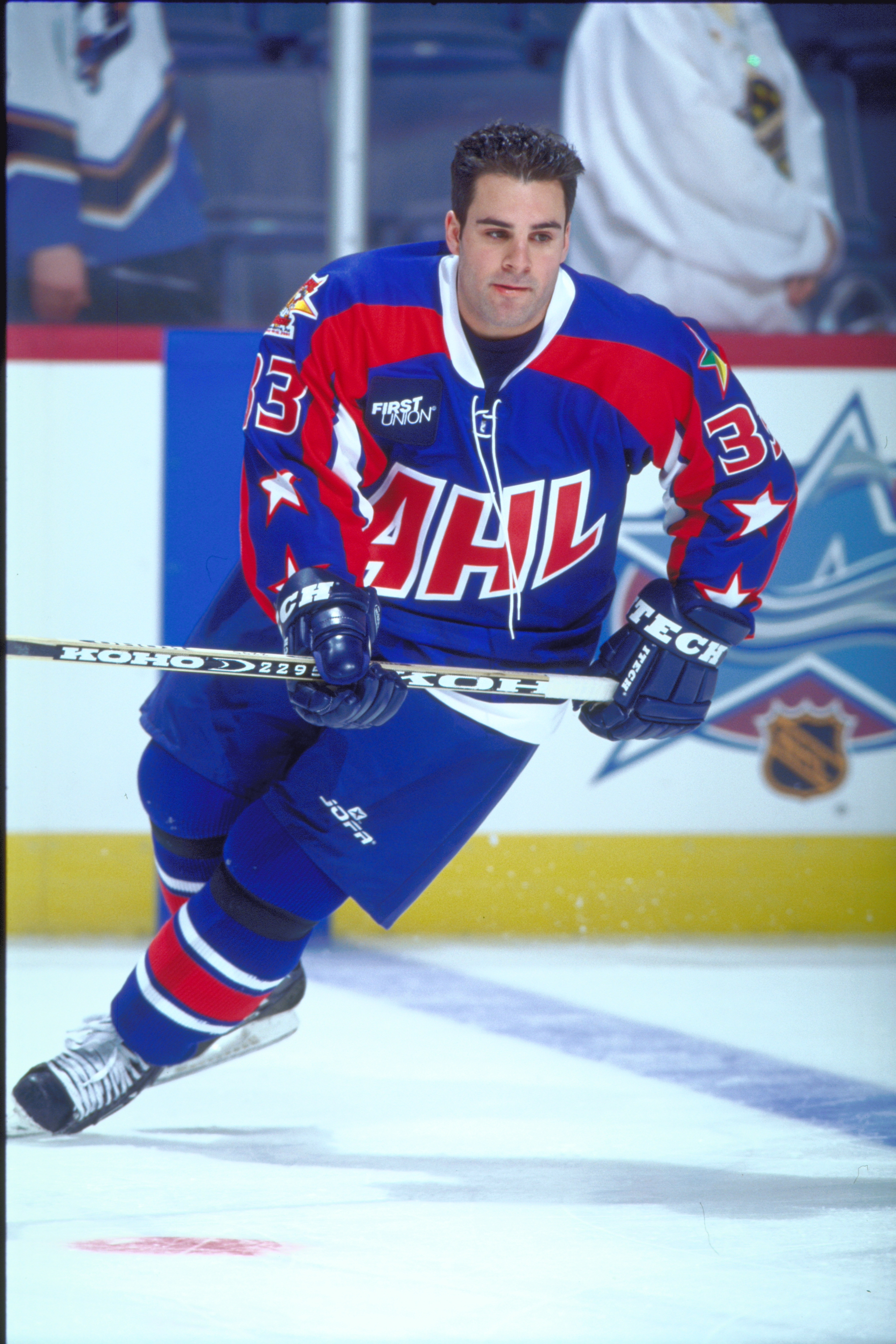
- Boguniecki in 2001
- Born: May 6, 1975 (age 51) New Haven, Connecticut, U.S.
- Height: 5 ft 8 in (173 cm)
- Weight: 195 lb (88 kg; 13 st 13 lb)
- Position: Center
- Shot: Right
- Played for: Florida Panthers; St. Louis Blues; Pittsburgh Penguins; New York Islanders
- National team: United States
- NHL draft: 193rd overall, 1993; St. Louis Blues
- Playing career: 1997–2010

Eric Boguniecki (born May 6, 1975) is an American former National Hockey League (NHL) player.

== Playing career ==
As a youth, Boguniecki played in the 1989 Quebec International Pee-Wee Hockey Tournament with the New York Islanders minor ice hockey team.

Drafted 193rd overall in the 1993 NHL entry draft by the St. Louis Blues, Boguniecki's scoring ability in the minor leagues led to him being signed as a free agent by the Florida Panthers in 1999. He played just four games for the Panthers before returning to St. Louis in a trade also involving Andrej Podkonický.

A tough grinding forward, Boguniecki stood out on the ice due to his height, 5 feet 8 inches. He established himself in the NHL in the 2002–03 season, accumulating 49 points in 80 games. During the 2004–05 NHL lockout, Boguniecki played for the AHL's Worcester IceCats. A winner of the Les Cunningham award as the AHL's most valuable player in 2001–02, Eric Boguniecki was the first American born player to win this award since Eddie Olson (1952–53).

In December 2005, Boguniecki was traded to Pittsburgh Penguins scoring 6 goals and 10 assists before being signed by the Columbus Blue Jackets. He played for their AHL affiliate, the Syracuse Crunch, before being traded to the New York Islanders on October 25, 2006. He played 11 games in the 06–07 season and had no points and his plus/minus was even. He had 8 PIM. He played for the Islanders' affiliate AHL Bridgeport Sound Tigers and had 23 goals and 32 assists in 48 games.

For the 2007–08 season, Boguniecki played for the German DEL Team ERC Ingolstadt. On July 22, 2008, Boguniecki signed a one-year contract with the Anaheim Ducks. In the 2008-09 season, Eric was assigned to Ducks affiliate, the Iowa Chops, where he scored 34 points in 69 games.

On October 29, 2009, he signed with the ECHL's Alaska Aces.

== Coaching career ==
On July 12, 2011, Boguniecki was named the assistant coach of the Bridgeport Sound Tigers.

== Career statistics ==
=== Regular season and playoffs ===
			Regular season					Playoffs
Season	Team	League	GP	G	A	Pts	PIM	GP	G	A	Pts	PIM
1991–92	Westminster School	HS-Prep	—	—	—	—	—	—	—	—	—	—
1992–93	Westminster School	HS-Prep	24	30	24	54	55	—	—	—	—	—
1993–94	University of New Hampshire	HE	40	17	16	33	66	—	—	—	—	—
1994–95	University of New Hampshire	HE	34	12	19	31	62	—	—	—	—	—
1995–96	University of New Hampshire	HE	32	23	29	52	46	—	—	—	—	—
1996–97	University of New Hampshire	HE	36	26	31	57	58	—	—	—	—	—
1997–98	Dayton Bombers	ECHL	26	19	18	37	36	—	—	—	—	—
1997–98	Fort Wayne Komets	IHL	35	4	8	12	29	4	1	2	3	10
1998–99	Fort Wayne Komets	IHL	72	32	34	66	100	2	0	1	1	2
1999–00	Louisville Panthers	AHL	57	33	42	75	148	4	3	2	5	20
1999–00	Florida Panthers	NHL	4	0	0	0	2	—	—	—	—	—
2000–01	St. Louis Blues	NHL	1	0	0	0	0	—	—	—	—	—
2000–01	Louisville Panthers	AHL	28	13	12	25	56	—	—	—	—	—
2000–01	Worcester IceCats	AHL	45	17	28	45	100	9	3	2	5	10
2001–02	Worcester IceCats	AHL	63	38	46	84	181	3	2	0	2	4
2001–02	St. Louis Blues	NHL	8	0	1	1	4	1	0	1	1	0
2002–03	St. Louis Blues	NHL	80	22	27	49	38	7	1	2	3	2
2003–04	St. Louis Blues	NHL	27	6	4	10	20	1	0	0	0	0
2003–04	Worcester IceCats	AHL	3	0	1	1	0	—	—	—	—	—
2004–05	Worcester IceCats	AHL	5	2	1	3	2	—	—	—	—	—
2004–05	SC Langenthal	NLB	10	5	3	8	47	—	—	—	—	—
2005–06	St. Louis Blues	NHL	9	1	4	5	4	—	—	—	—	—
2005–06	Peoria Rivermen	AHL	2	0	0	0	4	—	—	—	—	—
2005–06	Pittsburgh Penguins	NHL	38	5	6	11	29	—	—	—	—	—
2006–07	Syracuse Crunch	AHL	6	0	0	0	8	—	—	—	—	—
2006–07	Bridgeport Sound Tigers	AHL	48	22	32	54	48	—	—	—	—	—
2006–07	New York Islanders	NHL	11	0	0	0	8	—	—	—	—	—
2007–08	ERC Ingolstadt	DEL	16	4	14	18	24	3	1	3	4	2
2008–09	Iowa Chops	AHL	69	18	16	34	52	—	—	—	—	—
2009–10	Alaska Aces	ECHL	51	19	28	47	52	4	0	2	2	2
AHL totals			351	155	188	343	643	16	8	4	12	34
NHL totals			178	34	42	76	105	9	1	3	4	2

=== International ===
Year	Team	Event	Result	GP	G	A	Pts	PIM
2000	United States	WC	5th	7	0	1	1	2
Senior totals				7	0	1	1	2

== Awards and honors ==
Award	Year
College
All-Hockey East Rookie Team	1993–94
Hockey East All-Tournament Team	1994
All-Hockey East All-Star	1996–97
AHL
All-Star Game	2000, 2001, 2002
First All-Star Team	2002
Willie Marshall Award	2002
Les Cunningham Award	2002
