= Rich Brennan =

American ice hockey player (born 1972)

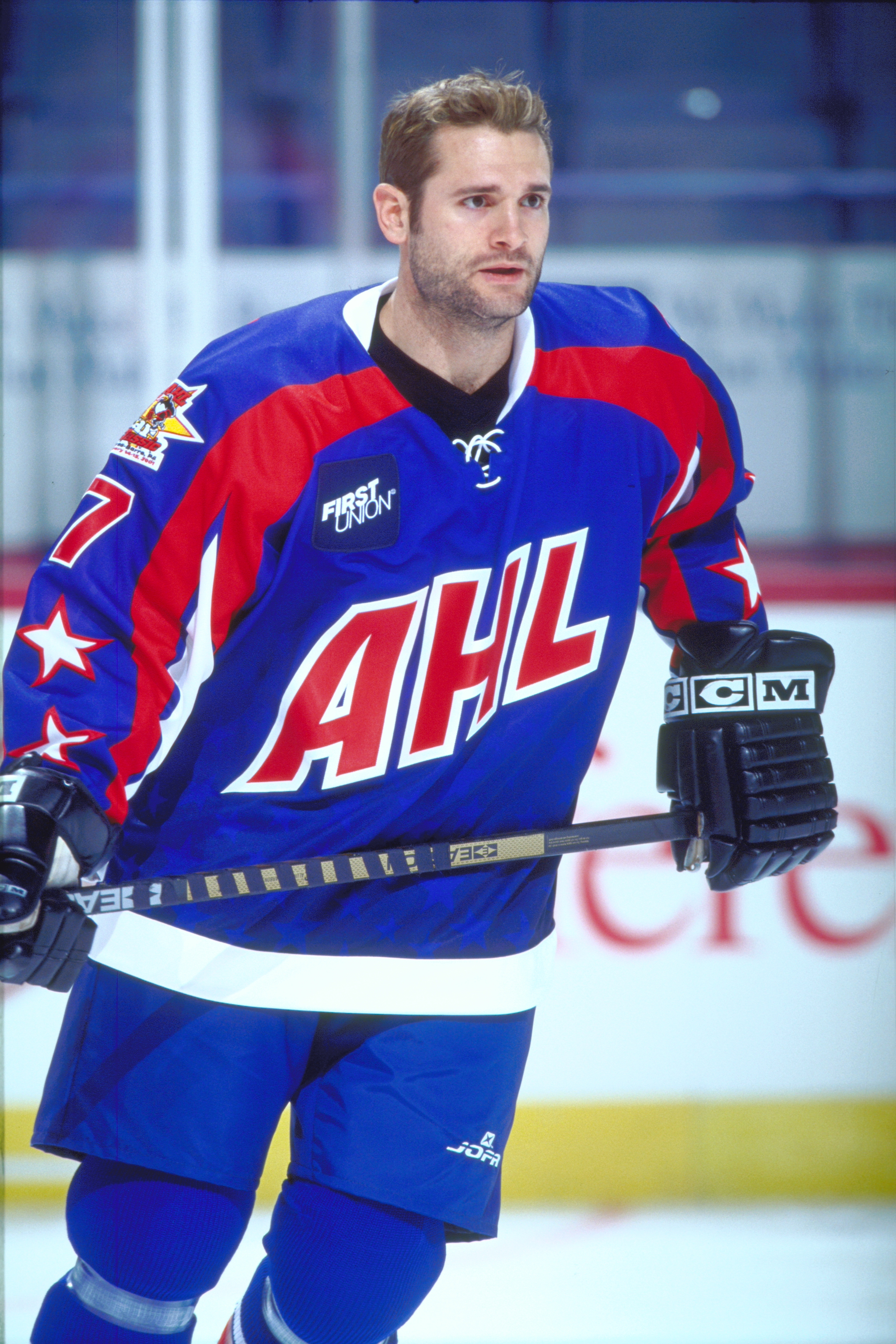
- Brennan in 2001
- Born: November 26, 1972 (age 53) Schenectady, NY, USA
- Height: 6 ft 2 in (188 cm)
- Weight: 200 lb (91 kg; 14 st 4 lb)
- Position: Defence
- Shot: Right
- Played for: NHL; Colorado Avalanche; San Jose Sharks; New York Rangers; Los Angeles Kings; Nashville Predators; Boston Bruins; DEL; Augsburger Panther; Nürnberg Ice Tigers; NLA; SC Bern; EBEL; HC TWK Innsbruck
- National team: United States
- NHL draft: 46th overall, 1991; Quebec Nordiques
- Playing career: 1995–2009

Richard John Brennan (born November 26, 1972) is an American retired professional ice hockey defenceman. He played briefly in the NHL with a number of teams including the Colorado Avalanche, San Jose Sharks, New York Rangers, Los Angeles Kings, Nashville Predators, and Boston Bruins.

== Playing career ==
Brennan was chosen in the 3rd round, 46th overall by the Quebec Nordiques in the 1991 NHL entry draft out of high school. After being drafted Brennan chose to go to college and played at Boston University for 4 years. In 1992 he played in the World Junior Ice Hockey Championship for the United States. Brennan's most successful collegiate season came during his junior year (1993–1994) when he scored 35 points in 41 games and earned a number of honors including Hockey East First All-Star team honors and NCAA East Second All-American team honors.

After college Brennan joined the Cornwall Aces for the 1995–96 season. Brennan spent the 1996–97 season with the Hershey Bears in addition to making his NHL debut, appearing in 2 games with the Colorado Avalanche. Brennan then signed as a free agent with the San Jose Sharks in 1997. He spent the majority of the 1997–98 season with the Sharks minor league affiliate Kentucky Thoroughblades while also appearing in 11 games with the Sharks before being traded to the New York Rangers and finishing the season with the Hartford Wolf Pack. The 1998–99 season saw Brennan play 47 games with the Wolf Pack in addition to playing in an NHL career high 24 games with the Rangers.

Brennan played the next 2 seasons with the Lowell Lock Monsters. During the 2000–01 season Brennan also managed to play in 2 games with the Los Angeles Kings. In 2001 Brennan signed with the Nashville Predators and spent the majority of the 2001–2002 season in the minors, only appearing in 4 games with the Predators. The 2002–03 and 2003–04 seasons saw Brennan play with the Providence Bruins. During the 2002–2003 season he played in 7 games with the Boston Bruins.

Brennan began playing in Europe in 2004. He split one year between Swiss team SC Bern of the NLA before transferring to Augsburger Panther of the DEL in Germany. Brennan remained in Germany the following season and played 3 seasons with the Nürnberg Ice Tigers. Brennan then spent the 2008–09 season in the Austrian Hockey League with HC TWK Innsbruck before retiring.

== Career statistics ==
=== Regular season and playoffs ===
| | | | Regular season | | | | | Playoffs |
| Season | Team | League | GP | G | A | Pts | PIM | GP | G | A | Pts | PIM |
|---|---|---|---|---|---|---|---|---|---|---|---|---|
| 1991–92 | Boston University | HE | 31 | 4 | 13 | 17 | 54 | — | — | — | — | — |
| 1992–93 | Boston University | HE | 40 | 9 | 11 | 20 | 68 | — | — | — | — | — |
| 1993–94 | Boston University | HE | 41 | 8 | 27 | 35 | 82 | — | — | — | — | — |
| 1994–95 | Boston University | HE | 31 | 5 | 23 | 28 | 56 | — | — | — | — | — |
| 1995–96 | Brantford Smoke | CoHL | 5 | 1 | 2 | 3 | 2 | — | — | — | — | — |
| 1995–96 | Cornwall Aces | AHL | 36 | 4 | 8 | 12 | 61 | 7 | 0 | 0 | 0 | 6 |
| 1996–97 | Hershey Bears | AHL | 74 | 11 | 45 | 56 | 88 | 23 | 2 | 16 | 18 | 22 |
| 1996–97 | Colorado Avalanche | NHL | 2 | 0 | 0 | 0 | 0 | — | — | — | — | — |
| 1997–98 | Kentucky Thoroughblades | AHL | 42 | 11 | 17 | 28 | 71 | — | — | — | — | — |
| 1997–98 | San Jose Sharks | NHL | 11 | 1 | 2 | 3 | 2 | — | — | — | — | — |
| 1997–98 | Hartford Wolf Pack | AHL | 9 | 2 | 4 | 6 | 12 | 15 | 4 | 5 | 9 | 14 |
| 1998–99 | Hartford Wolf Pack | AHL | 47 | 4 | 24 | 28 | 42 | — | — | — | — | — |
| 1998–99 | New York Rangers | NHL | 24 | 1 | 3 | 4 | 23 | — | — | — | — | — |
| 1999–00 | Lowell Lock Monsters | AHL | 67 | 15 | 30 | 45 | 110 | 7 | 1 | 5 | 6 | 0 |
| 2000–01 | Lowell Lock Monsters | AHL | 69 | 10 | 31 | 41 | 146 | — | — | — | — | — |
| 2000–01 | Los Angeles Kings | NHL | 2 | 0 | 0 | 0 | 0 | — | — | — | — | — |
| 2001–02 | Nashville Predators | NHL | 4 | 0 | 0 | 0 | 2 | — | — | — | — | — |
| 2001–02 | Milwaukee Admirals | AHL | 23 | 4 | 8 | 12 | 27 | — | — | — | — | — |
| 2001–02 | Manchester Monarchs | AHL | 16 | 2 | 5 | 7 | 6 | 5 | 1 | 1 | 2 | 16 |
| 2002–03 | Providence Bruins | AHL | 41 | 3 | 29 | 32 | 51 | — | — | — | — | — |
| 2002–03 | Boston Bruins | NHL | 7 | 0 | 1 | 1 | 6 | — | — | — | — | — |
| 2003–04 | Providence Bruins | AHL | 56 | 12 | 15 | 27 | 47 | 2 | 0 | 1 | 1 | 2 |
| 2004–05 | SC Langenthal | NLB | 1 | 0 | 2 | 2 | 0 | — | — | — | — | — |
| 2004–05 | SC Bern | NLA | 23 | 5 | 5 | 10 | 24 | — | — | — | — | — |
| 2004–05 | Augsburger Panther | DEL | 16 | 4 | 5 | 9 | 22 | 5 | 0 | 1 | 1 | 16 |
| 2005–06 | Nürnberg Ice Tigers | DEL | 52 | 12 | 21 | 33 | 54 | 4 | 0 | 1 | 1 | 10 |
| 2006–07 | Nürnberg Ice Tigers | DEL | 38 | 11 | 15 | 26 | 103 | 6 | 0 | 1 | 1 | 2 |
| 2007–08 | Nürnberg Ice Tigers | DEL | 47 | 7 | 26 | 33 | 69 | 5 | 0 | 0 | 0 | 4 |
| 2008–09 | HC TWK Innsbruck | EBEL | 49 | 9 | 15 | 24 | 46 | 4 | 0 | 1 | 1 | 27 |
| NHL totals | | | 50 | 2 | 6 | 8 | 33 | — | — | — | — | — |
| AHL totals | | | 480 | 78 | 216 | 294 | 661 | 59 | 8 | 28 | 36 | 54 |

Medal record

Representing United States

Ice hockey

World Junior Championships
| Bronze medal – third place | 1992 Fussen | |

=== International ===
| Year | Team | Event | Result | GP | G | A | Pts | PIM |
|---|---|---|---|---|---|---|---|---|
| 1992 | United States | WJC | 3rd place, bronze medalist(s) | 7 | 0 | 2 | 2 | 4 |
| Junior totals | | | | 7 | 0 | 2 | 2 | 4 |

== Awards and honors ==
| Award | Year |
|---|---|
College
| All-HE Rookie Team | 1991–92 |
| HE All-Tournament Team | 1993, 1994 |
| All-HE First Team | 1993–94 |
| AHCA East Second-Team All-American | 1993–94 |
AHL
| All-Star Game | 1997, 1998, 1999, 2000, 2001, 2002 |
| Calder Cup (Hershey Bears) | 1997 |
