= Sean O'Brien (ice hockey) =

American ice hockey player (born 1972)

- Born: February 9, 1972 (age 53) Boston, Massachusetts, U.S.
- Height: 6 ft 1 in (185 cm)
- Weight: 200 lb (91 kg; 14 st 4 lb)
- Position: Left wing
- Shot: Left
- Played for: Tappara
- NHL draft: Undrafted
- Playing career: 1994–2002

Sean O'Brien (born February 9, 1972) is an American former professional ice hockey left winger who played one season in the Finnish SM-liiga for Tappara.

== Awards and honors ==
Award	Year
All-ECAC Hockey Second team	1993–94
