= Dean Seymour =

Canadian ice hockey player

- Born: December 8, 1971 (age 54) Saskatoon, Saskatchewan, Canada
- Height: 5 ft 11 in (180 cm)
- Weight: 176 lb (80 kg; 12 st 8 lb)
- Position: Centre
- Shot: Left
- Played for: KalPa (SM-liiga)
- Playing career: 1996–2004

Dean Seymour (born December 8, 1971) is a Canadian former professional ice hockey player. He played in the Finnish SM-liiga with KalPa during the 1997–98 season.

He is currently a Peewee Tier 1 coach in the Greater Saskatoon Hockey League.

== Awards and honors ==
Award	Year
All-WCHA Rookie Team	1993–94
