= Terry Virtue =

Canadian ice hockey player

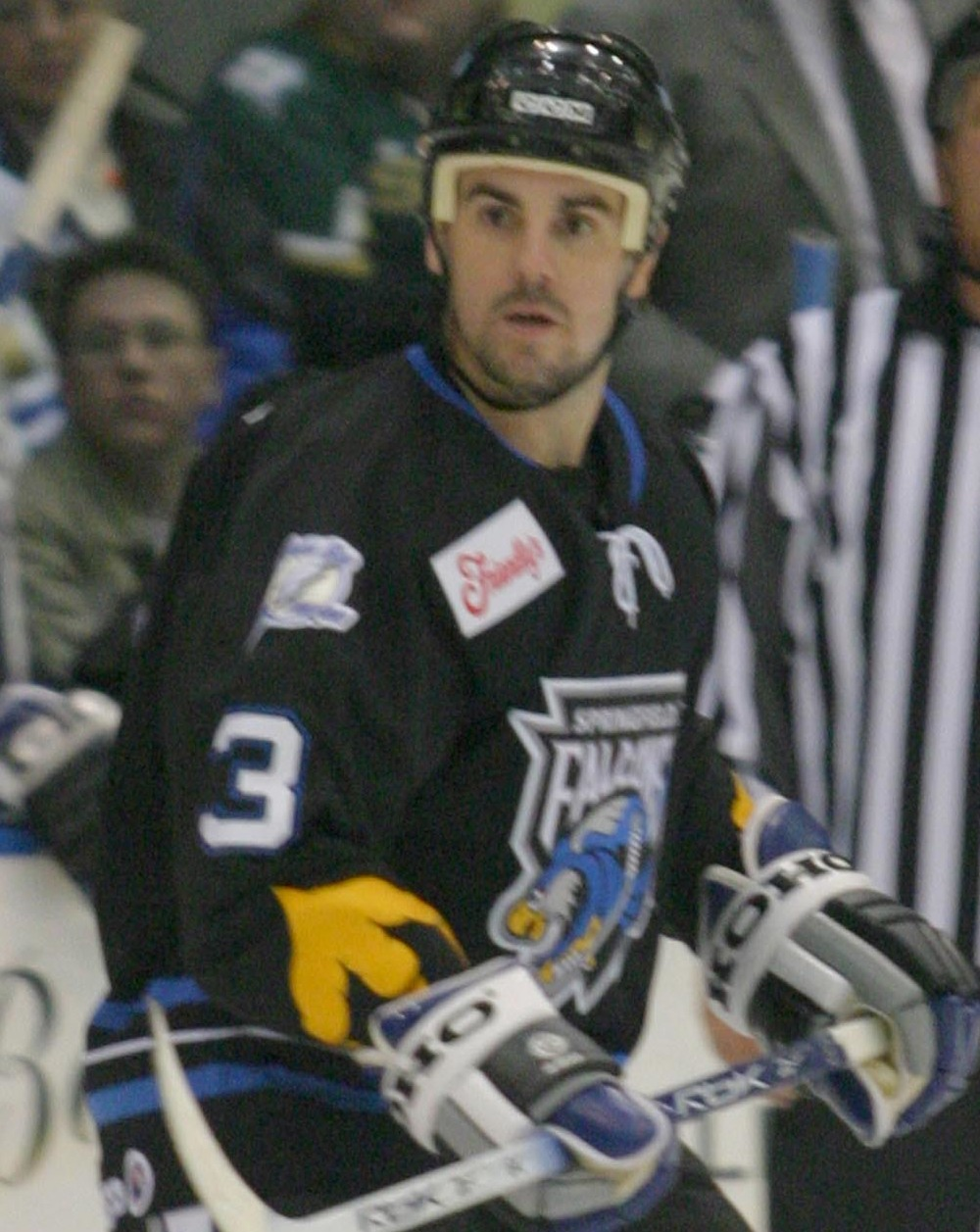
- Virtue with the Springfield Falcons in 2004
- Born: August 12, 1970 (age 56) Scarborough, Ontario, Canada
- Height: 6 ft 0 in (183 cm)
- Weight: 195 lb (88 kg; 13 st 13 lb)
- Position: Defence
- Shot: Right
- Played for: Boston Bruins; New York Rangers
- NHL draft: Undrafted
- Playing career: 1988–2007

Terry William Virtue (born August 12, 1970) is a Canadian former ice hockey defenceman. He played 5 games in the National Hockey League with the Boston Bruins and New York Rangers during the 1998–99 and 1999–00 seasons. The rest of his career, which lasted from 1991 to 2007, was spent in the minor leagues.

== Playing career ==
Virtue spent his professional career in the minor leagues, most notably for the Worcester IceCats of the American Hockey League one of the several teams for which he served as team captain known as Mr. IceCat for team records. He won the Calder Cup as Assistant Captain with the Hartford Wolf Pack in 2000, scoring the overtime goal that propelled the Wolf Pack into the finals with the Rochester Americans. He played five games in the National Hockey League, four in the 1998–99 season for the Boston Bruins, and one the next season for the New York Rangers.

Virtue retired from hockey after the 2006–07 season. Virtue's 210 points with the IceCats were the most points in Worcester hockey history until November 29, 2025 when Anthony Repacci of the Worcester Railers scored his 211th point.

== Coaching career ==
After retiring as a player, Virtue returned to the Tri-City Americans of the Western Hockey League, one of the teams he had played for as a junior. He was an assistant coach in 2007–08 and 2008–09, then associate coach in 2009–10. In 2010 the Americans reached the WHL final, which they lost to the Calgary Hitmen.

He then joined the Owen Sound Attack of the Ontario Hockey League as associate coach for the 2010–11 and 2011–12 seasons. In 2010–11 the Attack won the J. Ross Robertson Cup as OHL champions and played in the 2011 Memorial Cup. When head coach Mark Reeds left after the championship to join the Ottawa Senators, Virtue was one of three finalists considered to replace him. In Owen Sound he was mainly responsible for defensive-zone play and the penalty kill, after the team had finished last in the league the season before his arrival.

Virtue later left major junior hockey to coach his son, Braeden, in minor hockey. In the Pittsburgh area he coached the Canon-McMillan High School varsity team and the AAA U-14 Esmark Stars. He has said that the high school team he coached won the Pennsylvania Interscholastic Hockey League championship in his second season. He also served as head coach of the ice hockey program at Wheeling Jesuit University and at Shrewsbury High School in Massachusetts, and has run skills sessions for young players in Massachusetts.

=== Coaching approach ===
Virtue has said that by his mid-twenties in the AHL he saw his role as helping younger players reach the NHL, citing defencemen such as Bryce Salvador and Jamie Rivers, and that near the end of his playing career he was "more of a coach than I was a player". As a skills instructor, he favours game-like repetitions in practice, arguing that many young players have never learned to read where pressure is coming from on the ice.

== Personal life ==
He grew up in Spruce Grove Alberta, and graduated high school at Spruce Grove Composite high in 1988 after playing his first year junior for the Hobbema Hawks.

== Career statistics ==
=== Regular season and playoffs ===
			Regular season					Playoffs
Season	Team	League	GP	G	A	Pts	PIM	GP	G	A	Pts	PIM
1988–89	Hobbema Hawks	AJHL	56	6	31	37	339	—	—	—	—	—
1988–89	Victoria Cougars	WHL	8	1	1	2	13	8	0	3	3	8
1989–90	Victoria Cougars	WHL	24	1	9	10	85	—	—	—	—	—
1989–90	Tri-City Americans	WHL	34	1	10	11	82	6	0	0	0	32
1990–91	Tri-City Americans	WHL	11	1	8	9	24	—	—	—	—	—
1990–91	Portland Winter Hawks	WHL	59	9	44	53	127	—	—	—	—	—
1991–92	Roanoke Valley Rebels	ECHL	38	4	22	26	165	—	—	—	—	—
1991–92	Louisville Icehawks	ECHL	23	1	15	16	58	13	0	8	8	49
1992–93	Louisville Icehawks	ECHL	28	0	17	17	84	—	—	—	—	—
1992–93	Wheeling Thunderbirds	ECHL	31	3	15	18	86	—	—	—	—	—
1993–94	Cape Breton Oilers	AHL	26	4	6	10	10	5	0	0	0	17
1993–94	Wheeling Thunderbirds	ECHL	34	5	28	33	61	6	2	2	4	4
1994–95	Atlanta Knights	IHL	1	0	0	0	2	—	—	—	—	—
1994–95	Worcester IceCats	AHL	73	14	25	39	186	—	—	—	—	—
1995–96	Worcester IceCats	AHL	76	7	31	38	234	4	0	0	0	4
1996–97	Worcester IceCats	AHL	80	16	26	42	220	5	0	4	4	8
1997–98	Worcester IceCats	AHL	74	8	26	34	233	11	1	4	5	41
1998–99	Providence Bruins	AHL	76	8	48	56	117	17	2	12	14	29
1998–99	Boston Bruins	NHL	4	0	0	0	0	—	—	—	—	—
1999–00	New York Rangers	NHL	1	0	0	0	0	—	—	—	—	—
1999–00	Hartford Wolf Pack	AHL	67	5	22	27	166	23	3	7	10	57
2000–01	Hartford Wolf Pack	AHL	71	5	24	29	166	5	1	0	1	2
2001–02	Hartford Wolf Pack	AHL	76	4	20	24	117	10	0	1	1	19
2002–03	Worcester IceCats	AHL	78	5	30	35	144	—	—	—	—	—
2003–04	Worcester IceCats	AHL	74	6	16	22	66	10	1	0	1	19
2004–05	Springfield Falcons	AHL	13	1	1	2	21	—	—	—	—	—
2004–05	Utah Grizzlies	AHL	65	3	18	21	122	—	—	—	—	—
2005–06	Wheeling Nailers	ECHL	54	7	34	41	98	—	—	—	—	—
2005–06	Wilkes-Barre/Scranton Penguins	AHL	4	0	1	1	4	—	—	—	—	—
2005–06	Grand Rapids Griffins	AHL	12	1	1	2	33	16	0	8	8	42
2006–07	Austin Ice Bats	CHL	51	9	24	33	89	—	—	—	—	—
2006–07	Binghamton Senators	AHL	23	1	4	5	27	—	—	—	—	—
AHL totals			888	88	299	387	1853	106	8	40	48	249
NHL totals			5	0	0	0	0	—	—	—	—	—

== Awards and honors ==
Award	Year
AHL Calder Cup Champion	1998–99, 1999–00
AHL Most Assists by Defenseman	1998–99
AHL Second All-Star Team	1998–99
OHL champion (J. Ross Robertson Cup), as associate coach	2010–11
