= Jeff Wells (ice hockey) =

Canadian ice hockey player

- Born: May 19, 1970 (age 56) Brockville, Ontario, Canada
- Height: 6 ft 0 in (183 cm)
- Weight: 183 lb (83 kg; 13 st 1 lb)
- Position: Defenseman
- Shot: Right
- Played for: Bowling Green; Providence Bruins; Birmingham Bulls; Cincinnati Cyclones; Seibu Bears Tokyo; Toledo Storm; Cleveland Barons; Fort Worth Brahmas
- Playing career: 1990–2006

Jeffrey Wells is a Canadian retired ice hockey defenseman who was an All-American for Bowling Green.

== Career ==
Wells began attending Bowling Green State University in 1990 and quickly became a fixture on the defense. After a good first year, Wells led the Falcons' defense in scoring as a sophomore. Unfortunately, the team flagged badly and posted the worst record in program history. Wells was named an alternate captain for his junior season and responded by more than doubling his point total. He finished third on the team in scoring and helped the team recover by winning 11 more games than the year before. He was named team captain for his final year and tied for the team lead in scoring, becoming the first defenseman in program history to achieve that feat. He led the team to its first winning season in 4 years and was named as an All-American for his achievements.

After graduating in 1994, Wells began his professional career. He spent six years playing at the highest level of the minor leagues in North America but wasn't able to earn a callup to the NHL. In 2000 he decided to travel across the Pacific and spent a year with the Seibu Bears. He returned the following year, spending part of the 2002 season with the Toledo Storm and then went into semi-retirement. He played a handful of games over the succeeding 4 years, finishing up with the Fort Worth Brahmas.

== Personal ==
Wells' son Justin followed in his father's footsteps, matriculating to Bowling Green and spending 4 years with the program before transferring to Boston College as a graduate.

== Statistics ==
=== Regular season and playoffs ===
| | | | Regular Season | | | | | Playoffs |
| Season | Team | League | GP | G | A | Pts | PIM | GP | G | A | Pts | PIM |
|---|---|---|---|---|---|---|---|---|---|---|---|---|
| 1987–88 | Nepean Raiders | CJHL | 49 | 21 | 24 | 45 | 26 | — | — | — | — | — |
| 1988–89 | Nepean Raiders | CJHL | 56 | 14 | 27 | 41 | 46 | — | — | — | — | — |
| 1990–91 | Bowling Green | CCHA | 36 | 3 | 9 | 12 | 12 | — | — | — | — | — |
| 1991–92 | Bowling Green | CCHA | 31 | 5 | 13 | 18 | 20 | — | — | — | — | — |
| 1992–93 | Bowling Green | CCHA | 41 | 11 | 27 | 38 | 22 | — | — | — | — | — |
| 1993–94 | Bowling Green | CCHA | 38 | 8 | 29 | 37 | 40 | — | — | — | — | — |
| 1994–95 | Providence Bruins | AHL | 51 | 3 | 11 | 14 | 23 | 9 | 2 | 1 | 3 | 0 |
| 1995–96 | Birmingham Bulls | ECHL | 3 | 1 | 2 | 3 | 4 | — | — | — | — | — |
| 1995–96 | Cincinnati Cyclones | IHL | 62 | 10 | 19 | 29 | 46 | 17 | 2 | 4 | 6 | 8 |
| 1996–97 | Cincinnati Cyclones | IHL | 79 | 10 | 11 | 21 | 41 | 3 | 0 | 0 | 0 | 4 |
| 1997–98 | Cincinnati Cyclones | IHL | 82 | 10 | 30 | 40 | 50 | 9 | 1 | 2 | 3 | 16 |
| 1998–99 | Cincinnati Cyclones | IHL | 82 | 9 | 29 | 38 | 41 | 3 | 0 | 1 | 1 | 0 |
| 1999–00 | Providence Bruins | AHL | 74 | 9 | 23 | 32 | 51 | 6 | 2 | 0 | 2 | 0 |
| 2000–01 | Seibu Bears Tokyo | JIHL | 40 | 8 | 23 | 31 | — | — | — | — | — | — |
| 2001–02 | Toledo Storm | ECHL | 22 | 5 | 7 | 12 | 18 | — | — | — | — | — |
| 2002–03 | Toledo Storm | ECHL | 1 | 0 | 0 | 0 | 0 | — | — | — | — | — |
| 2002–03 | Cleveland Barons | AHL | 4 | 0 | 1 | 1 | 2 | — | — | — | — | — |
| 2003–04 | Toledo Storm | ECHL | 1 | 0 | 0 | 0 | 0 | — | — | — | — | — |
| 2005–06 | Fort Worth Brahmas | CHL | 2 | 0 | 0 | 0 | 0 | — | — | — | — | — |
| CJHL totals | | | 105 | 35 | 51 | 86 | 72 | — | — | — | — | — |
| NCAA totals | | | 146 | 27 | 78 | 105 | 94 | — | — | — | — | — |
| AHL totals | | | 129 | 12 | 35 | 47 | 76 | 15 | 4 | 1 | 5 | 0 |
| IHL totals | | | 305 | 39 | 89 | 128 | 178 | 32 | 3 | 7 | 10 | 28 |
| ECHL totals | | | 27 | 6 | 9 | 15 | 22 | — | — | — | — | — |

== Awards and honors ==
| Award | Year |
|---|---|
| All-CCHA First Team | 1993–94 |
| AHCA West Second-Team All-American | 1993–94 |
