= 1994 WCHA men's ice hockey tournament =

1994 WCHA Men's ice hockey tournament
- Dates: March 11–19, 1994
- Teams: 10
- Finals site: Bradley Center; Milwaukee
- Champions: Minnesota (9th title)
- Winning coach: Doug Woog (2nd title)
- MVP: Chris McAlpine (Minnesota)
- Attendance: 61,367
- WCHA Men's Ice Hockey Tournaments

The 1994 WCHA Men's Ice Hockey Tournament was the 35th conference playoff in league history and 42nd season where a WCHA champion was crowned. The tournament was played between March 11 and March 19, 1994. First round games were played at home team campus sites while all 'Final Five' matches were held at the Bradley Center in Milwaukee. By winning the tournament, Minnesota was awarded the Broadmoor Trophy and received the WCHA's automatic bid to the 1994 NCAA Division I Men's Ice Hockey Tournament.

== Format ==
The first round of the postseason tournament featured a best-of-three games format. All nine conference teams participated in the tournament as did Mankato State which was slated to join the WCHA as a full member in two years. Teams were seeded No. 1 through No. 9 according to their final conference standing, with a tiebreaker system used to seed teams with an identical number of points accumulated while Mankato State was seeded tenth. The top five seeded teams each earned home ice and hosted one of the lower seeded teams.

The winners of the first round series advanced to the Bradley Center for the WCHA Final Five, the collective name for the quarterfinal, semifinal, and championship rounds. The Final Five uses a single-elimination format. Teams were re-seeded No. 1 through No. 5 according to the final regular season conference standings, with the top three teams automatically advancing to the semifinals and the remaining two playing in a quarterfinal game. The semifinal pitted the top remaining seed against the winner of the quarterfinal game while the two other teams that received byes were matched against one another with the winners advancing to the championship game and the losers meeting in a Third Place contest. The Tournament Champion received an automatic bid to the 1994 NCAA Division I Men's Ice Hockey Tournament.

=== Conference standings ===
Note: GP = Games played; W = Wins; L = Losses; T = Ties; PTS = Points; GF = Goals For; GA = Goals Against

1993–94 Western Collegiate Hockey Association standings
	Conference							Overall					
	GP	W	L	T	PTS	GF	GA	GP	W	L	T	GF	GA
Colorado College†	32	18	9	5	41	135	126	39	23	11	5	163	138
Minnesota*	32	18	10	4	40	111	109	42	25	13	4	151	142
Wisconsin	32	19	12	1	39	128	103	42	26	15	1	172	133
St. Cloud State	32	16	12	4	36	127	111	38	21	13	4	160	135
Northern Michigan	32	17	14	1	35	129	120	39	22	16	1	157	140
Alaska-Anchorage	32	14	16	2	30	110	109	36	15	19	2	123	132
Minnesota-Duluth	32	12	17	3	27	125	131	38	14	21	3	144	160
North Dakota	32	11	17	4	26	101	131	38	11	23	4	119	164
Denver	32	11	18	3	25	116	130	38	15	20	3	146	155
Michigan Tech	32	8	19	5	21	93	105	45	13	27	5	135	163
Championship: Minnesota † indicates conference regular season champion * indicates conference tournament champion

== Bracket ==
Teams are reseeded after the first round

First Round; March 11–12
1	Colorado College	2	3	2
10	Michigan Tech	3	0	3*
2	Minnesota	8	6	—
9	Denver	5	3	—
3	Wisconsin	6	4	—
8	North Dakota	1	2	—
4	St. Cloud State	3	8	—
7	Minnesota-Duluth	0	5	—
5	Northern Michigan	5	5	—
6	Alaska-Anchorage	2	1	—

Quarterfinal; March 17
5	Northern Michigan	1
10	Michigan Tech	5

Semifinals; March 18
2	Minnesota	6
10	Michigan Tech	1
3	Wisconsin	2
4	St. Cloud State	3*

Championship; March 19
2	Minnesota	3*
4	St. Cloud State	2

Note: * denotes overtime period(s)

=== Quarterfinals ===
==== (1) Colorado College vs. (10) Michigan Tech ====
March 11	Colorado College	2 – 3	Michigan Tech	Broadmoor World Arena

March 12	Colorado College	3 – 0	Michigan Tech	Broadmoor World Arena

March 13	Colorado College	2 – 3	Michigan Tech	Broadmoor World Arena

Michigan Tech won series 2–1

==== (2) Minnesota vs. (9) Denver ====
March 11	Minnesota	8 – 5	Denver	Mariucci Arena

March 12	Minnesota	6 – 3	Denver	Mariucci Arena

Minnesota won series 2–0

==== (3) Wisconsin vs. (8) North Dakota ====
March 11	Wisconsin	6 – 1	North Dakota	Dane County Coliseum

March 12	Wisconsin	4 – 2	North Dakota	Dane County Coliseum

Wisconsin won series 2–0

==== (4) St. Cloud State vs. (7) Minnesota-Duluth ====
March 11	St. Cloud State	3 – 0	Minnesota-Duluth	National Hockey Center

March 12	St. Cloud State	8 – 5	Minnesota-Duluth	National Hockey Center

St. Cloud State won series 2–0

==== (5) Northern Michigan vs. (6) Alaska-Anchorage ====
March 11	Northern Michigan	5 – 2	Alaska-Anchorage	Lakeview Arena

March 12	Northern Michigan	5 – 1	Alaska-Anchorage	Lakeview Arena

Northern Michigan won series 2–0

=== Quarterfinal ===
==== (5) Northern Michigan vs. (10) Michigan Tech ====
March 17	Northern Michigan	1 – 5	Michigan Tech	Bradley Center

=== Semifinals ===
==== (2) Minnesota vs. (10) Michigan Tech ====
March 18	Minnesota	6 – 1	Michigan Tech	Bradley Center

==== (3) Wisconsin vs. (4) St. Cloud State ====
March 18	Wisconsin	2 – 3	OT	St. Cloud State	Bradley Center

=== Third Place ===
==== (3) Wisconsin vs. (10) Michigan Tech ====
March 19	Wisconsin	8 – 3	Michigan Tech	Bradley Center

=== Championship ===
==== (2) Minnesota vs. (4) St. Cloud State ====
March 19	Minnesota	3 – 2	OT	St. Cloud State	Bradley Center

== Tournament awards ==
=== All-Tournament Team ===
- F Brian Bonin (Minnesota)
- F Bill Lund (St. Cloud State)
- F Jeff Nielsen (Minnesota)
- D Mickey Elick (Wisconsin)
- D Chris McAlpine* (Minnesota)
- G Grant Sjerven (St. Cloud State)

* Most Valuable Player(s)

== See also ==
- Western Collegiate Hockey Association men's champions
