= 1994 Hockey East men's ice hockey tournament =

1994 Hockey East Men's ice hockey tournament
- Dates: March 11–19, 1994
- Teams: 8
- Finals site: Boston Garden; Boston, Massachusetts
- Champions: Boston University (3rd title)
- Winning coach: Jack Parker (3rd title)
- MVP: Dwayne Roloson (Massachusetts-Lowell)
- Hockey East Men's Ice Hockey Tournaments

The 1994 Hockey East Men's Ice Hockey Tournament was the 10th tournament in the history of the conference. It was played between March 11 and March 19, 1994. Quarterfinal games were played at home team campus sites, while the final four games were played at the Boston Garden in Boston, Massachusetts, the home venue of the NHL's Boston Bruins. By winning the tournament, Boston University received the Hockey East's automatic bid to the 1994 NCAA Division I Men's Ice Hockey Tournament.

== Format ==
The tournament featured three rounds of play. In the first round, the first and eighth seeds, the second and seventh seeds, the third seed and sixth seeds, and the fourth seed and fifth seeds played a best-of-three with the winner advancing to the semifinals. In the semifinals, the highest and lowest seeds and second highest and second lowest seeds play a single-elimination game, with the winners advancing to the championship game and the losers meeting in a third-place game. The tournament champion receives an automatic bid to the 1994 NCAA Division I Men's Ice Hockey Tournament.

== Conference standings ==
Note: GP = Games played; W = Wins; L = Losses; T = Ties; PTS = Points; GF = Goals For; GA = Goals Against

1993–94 Hockey East standings
	Conference							Overall					
	GP	W	L	T	PTS	GF	GA	GP	W	L	T	GF	GA
Boston University†*	24	21	3	0	42	120	63	41	34	7	0	195	113
Massachusetts–Lowell	24	14	6	4	32	91	91	40	25	10	5	164	120
New Hampshire	24	13	9	2	28	90	91	40	25	12	3	145	125
Northeastern	24	10	8	6	26	94	95	39	19	13	7	162	159
Providence	24	9	13	2	20	74	111	36	14	19	3	120	149
Boston College	24	7	12	5	19	85	96	35	15	16	5	145	133
Merrimack	24	8	14	2	18	77	110	37	16	19	2	126	152
Maine^	24	3	20	1	7	92	130	36	6	29	1	142	130
Championship: Boston University † indicates conference regular season champion * indicates conference tournament champion^ Towards the end of the season Maine was required to retroactively forfeit 14 games for using a player deemed ineligible by the NCAA

== Bracket ==
Teams are reseeded after the quarterfinals

Quarterfinals; March 11–13
1	Boston University	8	4	—
8	Maine	5	3	—
2	Massachusetts-Lowell	7	3	—
7	Merrimack	1	0	—
(Pairings are reseeded after the first round)
3	New Hampshire	4	6*	—
6	Boston College	1	5	—
4	Northeastern	4	2*	—
5	Providence	3	1	—

Semifinals; March 18
1	Boston University	5
4	Northeastern	2
2	Massachusetts-Lowell	4
3	New Hampshire	2

Championship; March 19
1	Boston University	3
2	Massachusetts-Lowell	2
Consolation
3	New Hampshire	4*
4	Northeastern	4

Note: * denotes overtime period(s)

=== Quarterfinals ===
==== (1) Boston University vs. (8) Maine ====
March 12	Boston University	8 – 5	Maine	Walter Brown Arena

March 13	Boston University	4 – 3	Maine	Walter Brown Arena

Boston University won series 2–0

==== (2) Massachusetts-Lowell vs. (7) Merrimack ====
March 11	Massachusetts-Lowell	7 – 1	Merrimack	Tully Forum

March 12	Massachusetts-Lowell	3 – 0	Merrimack	Tully Forum

Massachusetts-Lowell won series 2–0

==== (3) New Hampshire vs. (6) Boston College ====
March 12	New Hampshire	4 – 1	Boston College	Snively Arena

March 13	New Hampshire	6 – 5	OT	Boston College	Snively Arena

New Hampshire won series 2–0

==== (4) Northeastern vs. (5) Providence ====
March 12	Northeastern	4 – 3	Providence	Matthews Arena

March 13	Northeastern	2 – 1	OT	Providence	Matthews Arena

Northeastern won series 2–0

=== Semifinals ===
==== (1) Boston University vs. (4) Northeastern ====
March 18	Boston University	5 – 2	Northeastern	Boston Garden

==== (2) Massachusetts-Lowell vs. (3) New Hampshire ====
March 18	Massachusetts-Lowell	4 – 2	New Hampshire	Boston Garden

=== Third Place ===
==== (3) New Hampshire vs. (4) Northeastern ====
March 19	New Hampshire	4 – 4	OT	Northeastern	Boston Garden

=== Championship ===
==== (1) Boston University vs. (2) Massachusetts-Lowell ====
March 19	Boston University	3 – 2	Massachusetts-Lowell	Boston Garden

== Tournament awards ==
=== All-Tournament Team ===
- F Eric Boguniecki (New Hampshire)
- F Greg Bullock (Massachusetts-Lowell)
- F Jacques Joubert (Boston University)
- D Rich Brennan (Boston University)
- D Kaj Linna (Boston University)
- G Dwayne Roloson* (Massachusetts-Lowell)

* Tournament MVP(s)
