= Marc Brown (ice hockey) =

Canadian ice hockey player and coach

- Born: March 10, 1979 (age 47) Richmond, British Columbia, Canada
- Height: 6 ft 1 in (185 cm)
- Weight: 201 lb (91 kg; 14 st 5 lb)
- Position: Left wing
- Shot: Left
- Played for: AHL; Worcester IceCats; Europe; Augsburger Panther; Nyköpings Hockey; Kloten Flyers; EC VSV; SC Langenthal; Graz 99ers Alleghe Hockey
- NHL draft: Undrafted
- Playing career: 1999–2012

Marc Brown (born March 10, 1979) is a Canadian former professional ice hockey player. He is an assistant coach with Villacher SV of the Austrian Hockey League.

== Career ==
Brown turned professional in 1999, and played five season with the Worcester IceCats of the American Hockey League (AHL), scoring 79 goals for the IceCats to establish the team's record for most career goals scored. Brown relocated to Germany to play the 2004–05 season with the Augsburger Panther. He bounced around the European leagues until hanging up his skates following the 2011–12 season.

== Career statistics ==
			Regular season					Playoffs
Season	Team	League	GP	G	A	Pts	PIM	GP	G	A	Pts	PIM
1996–97	Spokane Chiefs	WHL	52	4	8	12	37	2	0	0	0	0
1997–98	Spokane Chiefs	WHL	41	10	15	25	35	—	—	—	—	—
1997–98	Prince Albert Raiders	WHL	23	6	8	14	21	—	—	—	—	—
1998–99	Prince Albert Raiders	WHL	72	35	45	80	47	14	12	6	18	6
1999–00	Worcester IceCats	AHL	72	13	11	24	17	9	3	1	4	0
2000–01	Worcester IceCats	AHL	34	9	10	19	27	10	0	1	1	6
2001–02	Worcester IceCats	AHL	74	30	25	55	42	3	2	2	4	0
2002–03	Worcester IceCats	AHL	58	13	15	28	24	—	—	—	—	—
2003–04	Worcester IceCats	AHL	65	14	20	34	34	7	0	1	1	0
2004–05	Augsburger Panther	DEL	28	2	9	11	61	5	0	1	1	0
2005–06	Kloten Flyers	NLA	2	0	1	1	4	—	—	—	—	—
2005–06	IK Nyköping	Allsvenskan	6	0	2	2	14	—	—	—	—	—
2005–06	Villacher SV	EBEL	24	13	8	21	26	13	7	7	14	24
2006–07	Villacher SV	EBEL	53	12	37	49	40	8	3	3	6	12
2007–08	Villacher SV	EBEL	43	10	16	26	40	5	4	0	4	2
2008–09	SC Langenthal	NLB	2	0	1	1	2	—	—	—	—	—
2008–09	Graz 99ers	EBEL	13	5	2	7	24	—	—	—	—	—
2009–10	HC Alleghe	Italy	25	4	12	16	20	4	2	2	4	2
2010–11	EK Zell am See	Austria2	25	8	16	24	73	4	1	1	2	4
2011–12	ATSE Graz	Austria2	23	14	15	29	28	10	2	3	5	20
AHL totals			303	79	81	160	144	29	5	5	10	6
