= Dwayne Roloson =

Canadian ice hockey player (born 1969)

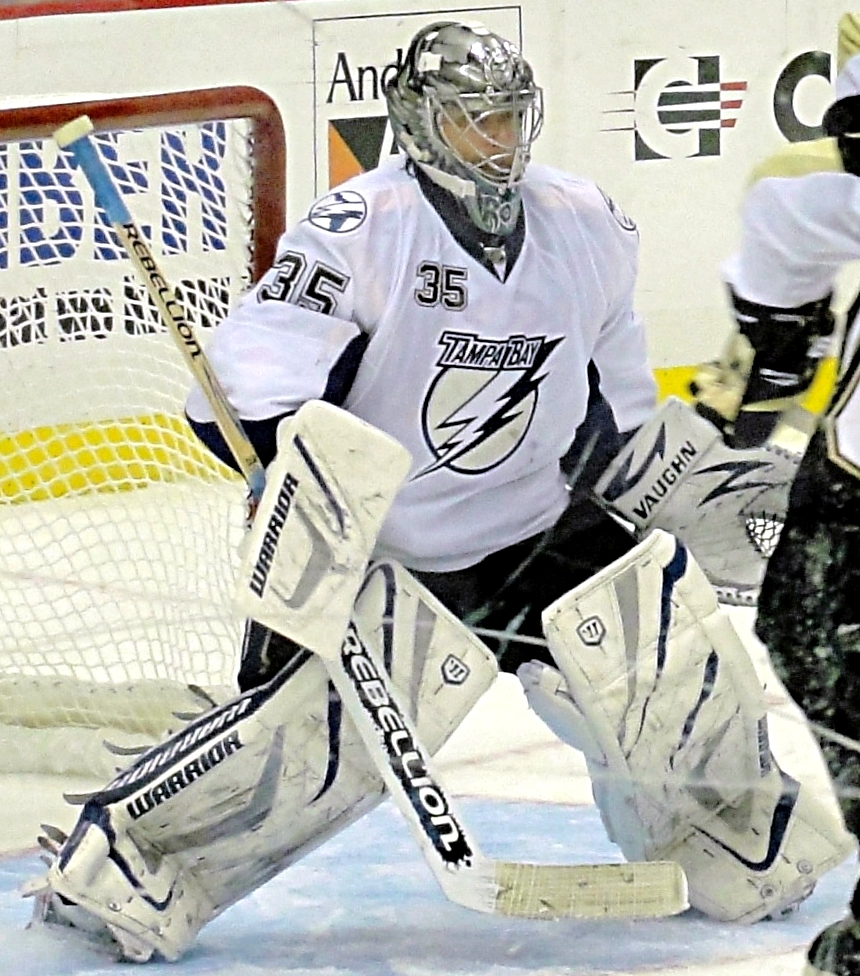
- Roloson with the Tampa Bay Lightning in 2011
- Born: October 12, 1969 (age 57) Simcoe, Ontario, Canada
- Height: 6 ft 1 in (185 cm)
- Weight: 180 lb (82 kg; 12 st 12 lb)
- Position: Goaltender
- Caught: Left
- Played for: Calgary Flames; Buffalo Sabres; Minnesota Wild; Edmonton Oilers; New York Islanders; Tampa Bay Lightning
- National team: Canada
- NHL draft: Undrafted
- Playing career: 1994–2012
Medal record
ice hockey
Representing Canada
World Championships
Gold medal – first place	2007 Moscow
Silver medal – second place	2009 Bern
Bronze medal – third place	1995 Stockholm

Albert Dwayne Roloson (born October 12, 1969) is a Canadian former professional ice hockey goaltender and former goaltending coach of the Anaheim Ducks of the National Hockey League (NHL). He is currently the Goaltending Coach and Director of Player Development for Lake Superior State University Men's Ice Hockey of the Central Collegiate Hockey Association (CCHA).

During his NHL career, Roloson played for the Calgary Flames, Buffalo Sabres, Minnesota Wild, Edmonton Oilers, New York Islanders and Tampa Bay Lightning.

He is often affectionately referred to by his fans as "Roli the Goalie". Following Mark Recchi's retirement in 2011, Roloson became the oldest active NHL player at the time and the last active NHL player to have been born in the 1960s.

== Early life and education ==
Roloson was born on October 12, 1969, in Simcoe, Ontario. He graduated from the University of Massachusetts Lowell.

== Playing career ==
=== Pre-NHL, Calgary and Buffalo ===
A Hobey Baker Award nominee and National Collegiate Athletic Association All-American while tending goal for University of Massachusetts Lowell, Roloson went undrafted after graduating. He was signed as a free agent by the NHL's Calgary Flames in 1994. After splitting time between the Flames and their American Hockey League (AHL) counterpart, the Saint John Flames, he was signed as a free agent by the Buffalo Sabres to back up Dominik Hašek. Following two years with the Sabres, he was picked up in the 2000 NHL expansion draft by the Columbus Blue Jackets. Rather than joining the Blue Jackets, Roloson signed with the St. Louis Blues and spent the entire season with their AHL affiliate, the Worcester IceCats.

=== NHL career ===
==== Minnesota Wild ====
Roloson earned a roster spot with the Minnesota Wild in 2001. In the 2002–03 season, Roloson shared goaltending duties with Manny Fernandez as the Wild made their first ever appearance in the Stanley Cup playoffs, reaching the Western Conference Final. Despite splitting goaltending duties with Fernandez, Roloson earned his first All-Star appearance at age 34, appearing in the 2004 NHL All-Star Game with the Western Conference team. He also won the Roger Crozier Saving Grace Award for having the NHL's best save percentage. During the 2004–05 NHL lockout, Roloson played for Lukko of the Finnish SM-liiga.

==== Edmonton Oilers ====
On March 8, 2006, Roloson was traded to the Edmonton Oilers in exchange for the first round pick that later became part of a trade for Pavol Demitra and a conditional draft pick that later became a third-rounder. Initially, Oilers general manager Kevin Lowe was harshly criticized for the acquisition when Roloson struggled during the regular season. Lowe was criticized both for not acquiring a better goaltender, and also for surrendering a first-round draft pick to a divisional rival.

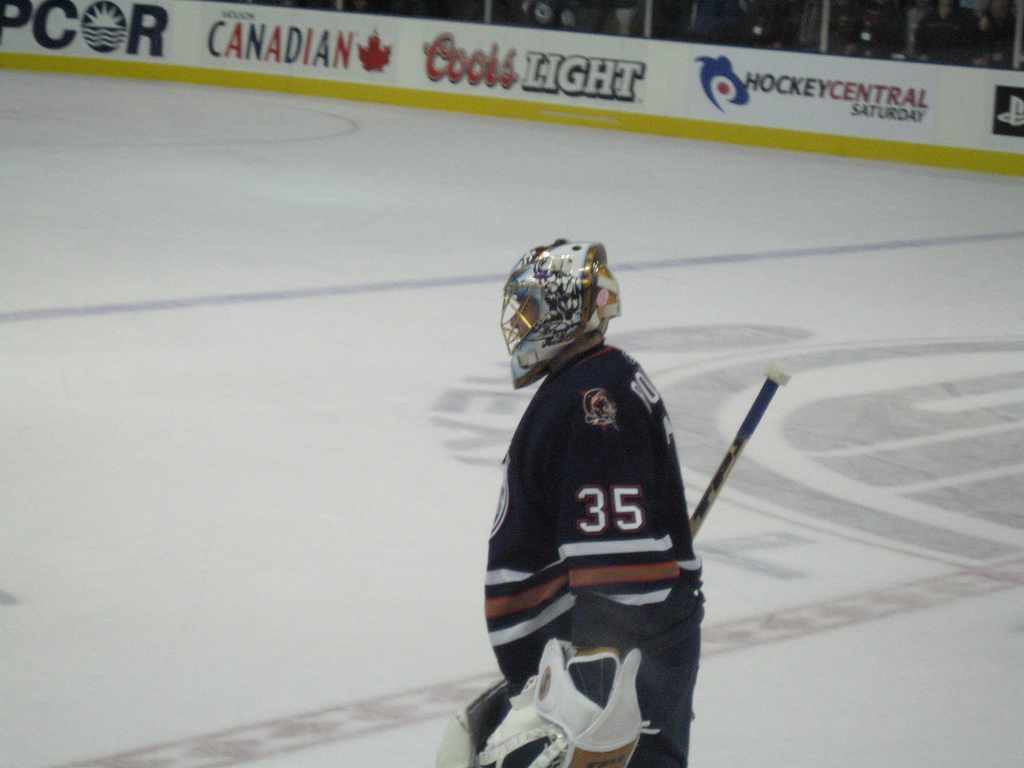
Roloson, playing for the Edmonton Oilers in October 2006

Criticism was muted following sensational play by Roloson, backstopping the Oilers to the final of the 2006 playoffs. He had a record of 12–5 through the first three rounds, and along with Chris Pronger, was considered a front-runner for the Conn Smythe Trophy as playoff MVP if the Oilers were victorious in the finals.

However, during Game 1 of the Stanley Cup Finals against the Carolina Hurricanes, Roloson suffered a third-degree MCL sprain of his right knee when Hurricanes forward Andrew Ladd was pushed into Roloson by a back-checking Oiler defenseman Marc-André Bergeron. Oilers head coach Craig MacTavish announced Roloson would not be able to continue in the series. It was also learned he had hyper-extended his right elbow in the collision as well. Back-up goaltender Ty Conklin replaced Roloson for the remainder of Game 1 and co-backup goalie Jussi Markkanen finished the series. The Oilers lost to the Hurricanes in seven games. Months of intense rehabilitation would follow in order to prepare Roloson for the 2006–07 season.

Roloson could have tested the unrestricted free agency market in the summer of 2006 but opted to re-sign with the Oilers on July 1, 2006, on a three-year contract.

In the 2007–08 season, Roloson started out strong before seeing his record fall to 7–12–0. By early January 2008, backup goaltender Mathieu Garon had taken the reins as starter. It was not until March 13, 2008, that Roloson saw regular play, coming in as relief for an injured Garon, starting each subsequent game.

When the 2008–09 season began, Roloson found himself vying for the starting goaltender position with Garon and upstart Jeff Deslauriers. For the beginning of the season, it appeared Garon was once again the starter but after some bad games Oiler head coach Craig MacTavish decided to rotate Garon, Deslauriers and Roloson by playing whoever had the hot hand. Eventually, the team traded Garon to the Pittsburgh Penguins and Roloson claimed the starting spot. Down the stretch, he started 36 consecutive games as the Oilers fought for a playoff spot. During this time, he became the oldest goaltender to start more than 60 games in a single season. Though the Oilers ultimately did not qualify for the playoffs, Roloson put up solid numbers, making upwards of 40 saves on a regular basis.

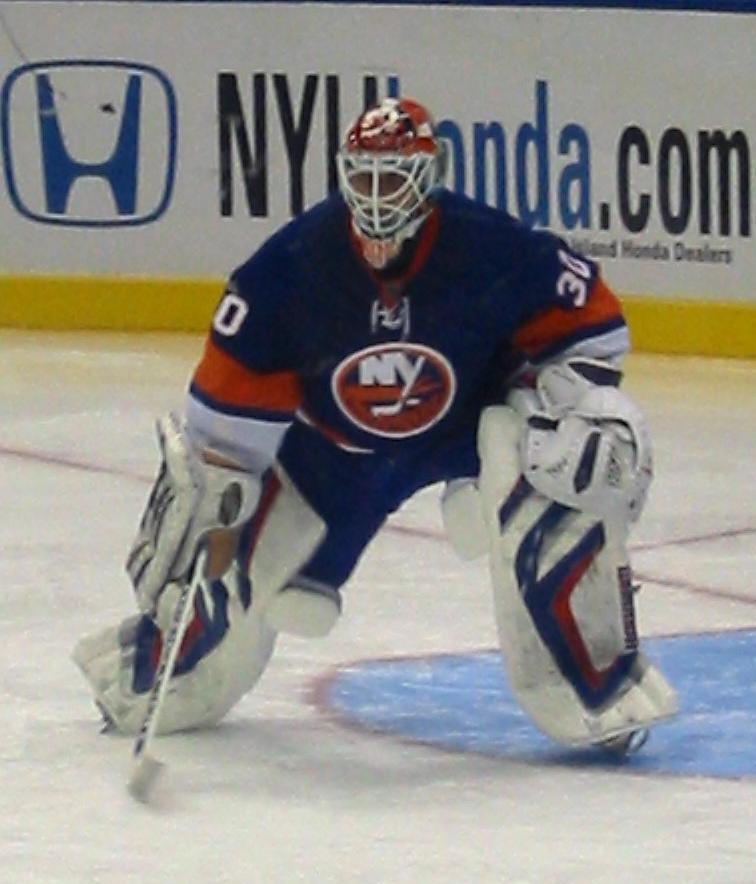
Roloson in goal for the New York Islanders in October 2009.

==== New York Islanders ====
On July 1, 2009, Roloson became an unrestricted free agent. After rejecting a one-year, $3 million offer from Edmonton, Roloson signed a two-year, $5 million contract with the New York Islanders. The Islanders also signed Martin Biron, who was to serve as Roloson's backup goaltender while Rick DiPietro was out on injured reserve. Roloson lost his first game as an Islander on October 3, 2009, in a shootout.

On November 23, 2009, Roloson made 58 saves on 61 shots in a 4–3 overtime win over the Toronto Maple Leafs. His 58 saves were the most by an NHL goaltender since Ron Tugnutt stopped 70 shots in 1991. Roloson also broke his own career-high and Rick DiPietro's franchise record for most saves in a single game.

==== Tampa Bay Lightning ====
On January 1, 2011, Roloson was traded to the Tampa Bay Lightning in exchange for defenceman Ty Wishart. He won his first game with Tampa Bay in a 1–0 overtime shutout against the Washington Capitals. In his first 11 games with the Lightning, he recorded four shutouts. In April 2011, Roloson recorded a shutout in a first round playoff Game 7 against the Pittsburgh Penguins, making him the oldest goaltender to do so. Roloson and the Lightning ultimately advanced to the 2011 Eastern Conference Finals against the Boston Bruins. Going into game six of the games six and seven, Roloson had never lost an elimination game in his career and with the Lightning down 3–2 and on the brink of elimination, Roloson and the Lightning defeated the Bruins 5–4 to force a game seven where the Lighting would fall 1–0, resulting in their elimination from the playoffs, one win short from reaching the Stanley Cup Finals and marking the first and only time in Roloson's career where he had been in net for an elimination game.

With his contract set to expire, the Lightning signed Roloson to a one-year, $3 million contract extension on June 29, 2011. He retired at season's end after the Lightning failed to qualify for the 2012 playoffs.

== International play ==
Roloson was a member of the Canadian 2007 IIHF World Championship team that won gold in a 4–2 win against Finland in Moscow.

In 2009, Roloson (along with Oilers teammate Shawn Horcoff) was called upon for Canada at the 2009 IIHF World Championship. He played in the finals against Russia, which Canada lost 2–1.

== Post-playing career ==
Following his retirement from ice hockey, Roloson was immediately hired as a consultant to the Anaheim Ducks' AHL affiliate, the Norfolk Admirals. On June 10, 2013, Roloson was named as the replacement for Pete Peeters as the Anaheim Ducks' goaltending consultant. On November 2, 2014, he suited-up in an emergency role after Ducks goaltender John Gibson suffered a pre-game injury and could not play the game against the Colorado Avalanche.

== Personal life ==
Roloson and his wife Melissa, who were married in 1999, have two sons. He is close friends with Rob Blake, with whom he played minor hockey in Simcoe, Ontario. He is also friends with Andrew Brunette.

The Saint Paul Police Federation swore in Dwayne Roloson as an honorary police officer for his interest and involvement with local law enforcement. He teaches his goalie school with Minnesota Wild goaltending coach Bob Mason.

While with the Tampa Bay Lightning, Roloson wore a mask that had a shamrock with the initials "KR" to remember Kelly Ryan, a 12-year-old player who attended several of Roloson's goalie camps. The shamrock also had the letters "TDLO", "The Dream Lives On".

== Career statistics ==
=== Regular season and playoffs ===
			Regular season										Playoffs
Season	Team	League	GP	W	L	T	OTL	MIN	GA	SO	GAA	SV%	GP	W	L	MIN	GA	SO	GAA	SV%
1984–85	Simcoe Penguins	NDJHL	3	—	—	—	—	100	21	—	12.60	—	—	—	—	—	—	—	—	—
1985–86	Simcoe Rams	NDJHL	1	—	—	—	—	60	6	0	6.00	—	—	—	—	—	—	—	—	—
1986–87	Norwich Merchants	NDJHL	19	—	—	—	—	1091	55	—	3.03	—	—	—	—	—	—	—	—	—
1987–88	Belleville Bobcats	MetJHL	21	9	6	1	—	1070	60	2	3.36	—	—	—	—	—	—	—	—	—
1988–89	Thorold Blackhawks	GHJHL	27	15	6	4	—	1490	82	0	3.30	—	—	—	—	—	—	—	—	—
1989–90	Thorold Blackhawks	GHJHL	30	18	8	1	—	1683	108	0	3.85	—	—	—	—	—	—	—	—	—
1990–91	UMass Lowell	HE	15	5	9	0	—	823	63	0	4.59	—	—	—	—	—	—	—	—	—
1991–92	UMass Lowell	HE	12	3	8	0	—	660	52	0	4.73	—	—	—	—	—	—	—	—	—
1992–93	UMass Lowell	HE	39	20	17	2	—	2342	150	0	3.84	—	—	—	—	—	—	—	—	—
1993–94	UMass Lowell	HE	40	23	10	7	—	2305	106	0	2.76	.909	—	—	—	—	—	—	—	—
1994–95	Saint John Flames	AHL	46	16	21	8	—	2734	156	1	3.42	.900	5	1	4	299	13	0	2.60	.897
1995–96	Saint John Flames	AHL	67	33	22	11	—	4026	190	1	2.83	.905	16	10	6	1027	49	1	2.86	.908
1996–97	Saint John Flames	AHL	8	6	2	0	—	481	22	1	2.75	.910	—	—	—	—	—	—	—	—
1996–97	Calgary Flames	NHL	31	9	14	3	—	1618	78	0	2.89	.897	—	—	—	—	—	—	—	—
1997–98	Saint John Flames	AHL	4	3	0	1	—	245	8	0	1.96	.939	—	—	—	—	—	—	—	—
1997–98	Calgary Flames	NHL	39	11	16	8	—	2205	110	0	2.89	.897	—	—	—	—	—	—	—	—
1998–99	Rochester Americans	AHL	2	2	0	0	—	120	4	0	2.00	.922	—	—	—	—	—	—	—	—
1998–99	Buffalo Sabres	NHL	18	6	8	2	—	911	42	1	2.77	.909	4	1	1	139	10	0	4.31	.870
1999–00	Buffalo Sabres	NHL	14	1	7	3	—	677	32	0	2.84	.884	—	—	—	—	—	—	—	—
2000–01	Worcester IceCats	AHL	52	32	15	5	—	3127	113	6	2.17	.929	11	6	5	697	23	1	1.97	.931
2001–02	Minnesota Wild	NHL	45	14	20	7	—	2506	112	5	2.68	.901	—	—	—	—	—	—	—	—
2002–03	Minnesota Wild	NHL	50	23	16	8	—	2945	98	4	2.00	.927	11	5	6	578	25	0	2.59	.903
2003–04	Minnesota Wild	NHL	48	19	18	11	—	2847	89	5	1.88	.933	—	—	—	—	—	—	—	—
2004–05	Lukko	SM-l	34	20	10	4	—	2048	70	4	2.05	.931	9	4	5	512	18	2	2.10	.941
2005–06	Minnesota Wild	NHL	24	6	17	—	1	1361	68	1	3.00	.910	—	—	—	—	—	—	—	—
2005–06	Edmonton Oilers	NHL	19	8	7	—	5	1163	47	1	2.42	.905	18	12	5	1159	45	1	2.33	.927
2006–07	Edmonton Oilers	NHL	68	27	34	—	6	3931	180	4	2.75	.909	—	—	—	—	—	—	—	—
2007–08	Edmonton Oilers	NHL	43	15	17	—	5	2340	119	0	3.05	.901	—	—	—	—	—	—	—	—
2008–09	Edmonton Oilers	NHL	63	28	24	—	9	3597	166	1	2.77	.915	—	—	—	—	—	—	—	—
2009–10	New York Islanders	NHL	50	23	18	—	7	2897	145	1	3.00	.907	—	—	—	—	—	—	—	—
2010–11	New York Islanders	NHL	20	6	13	—	1	1206	53	0	2.64	.916	—	—	—	—	—	—	—	—
2010–11	Tampa Bay Lightning	NHL	34	18	12	—	4	1993	85	4	2.56	.912	17	10	6	982	41	1	2.51	.924
2011–12	Tampa Bay Lightning	NHL	40	13	16	—	3	2099	128	1	3.66	.886	—	—	—	—	—	—	—	—
NHL totals			606	227	257	42	40	34,297	1552	33	2.72	.908	50	28	18	2860	121	2	2.54	.918

=== International ===
Year	Team	Event	Result	GP	W	L	OTL	MIN	GA	SO	GAA	SV%
1995	Canada	WC	3rd place, bronze medalist(s)	DNP	—	—	—	—	—	—	—	—
2007	Canada	WC	1st place, gold medalist(s)	4	4	0	0	240	10	0	2.50	.911
2009	Canada	WC	2nd place, silver medalist(s)	5	3	2	0	304	11	0	2.17	.930
Senior totals				9	7	2	0	544	21	0	2.32	.922

== Awards and honors ==
Award	Year
College
All-Hockey East First Team	1994
AHCA East First-Team All-American	1994
Hockey East All-Tournament Team	1994
AHL
All-Star Game	1995, 1996, 2001
Aldege "Baz" Bastien Memorial Award	2001
First All-Star Team	2001
NHL
All-Star Game	2004
Roger Crozier Saving Grace Award	2004

Awards and achievements
Preceded by Paul Kariya	Hockey East Player of the Year; 1993–94	Succeeded by Chris Imes
Preceded by Jim Montgomery	William Flynn Tournament Most Valuable Player; 1994	Succeeded by Bob Bell
Preceded by Marty Turco	Winner of the Crozier Award; 2004	Succeeded by Cristobal Huet
Preceded by Martin Brochu	Aldege "Baz" Bastien Memorial Award; 2000–01	Succeeded by Martin Prusek
