= Derek Maguire =

Canadian ice hockey player

- Born: December 9, 1971 (age 54) Rochester, New York, USA
- Height: 6 ft 0 in (183 cm)
- Weight: 205 lb (93 kg; 14 st 9 lb)
- Position: Defenseman
- Shot: Right
- Played for: Harvard; Fredericton Canadiens
- NHL draft: 186th overall, 1990; Montreal Canadiens
- Playing career: 1990–1996

Derek Maguire is an American retired ice hockey defenseman who was an All-American for Harvard.

== Career ==
Maguire was a star player for Delbarton School, helping his team win four consecutive Mennen Cups and win a share of the state championship as a junior. After graduating in 1990, he was selected by the Montreal Canadiens in the NHL Draft and then began attending Harvard University in the fall. Maguire was a more defensive-oriented player in college, playing against tougher opponents, but he was still able to help the Crimson finish atop the ECAC Hockey standings for three consecutive years. In his senior season, Maguire's offensive game came alive and he more than doubled his previous career best. He was named an All-American and pushed Harvard to an ECAC championship and an appearance in the Frozen Four.

After graduating with a degree in environmental science and public policy, Maguire began his professional career with the Fredericton Canadiens. He helped the team make a surprise run to the Calder Cup finals in 1995 and looked to be on track for a lengthy career, however, after just 7 games the following season, Maguire retired as a player and began working as a bond trader for Merrill Lynch. Over the course of several years, Maguire worked his way up through the company and is current the global director of rate sales (as of 2021).

He was inducted into the New Jersey High School Ice Hockey Hall of Fame in 2010.

== Statistics ==
=== Regular season and playoffs ===
			Regular Season					Playoffs
Season	Team	League	GP	G	A	Pts	PIM	GP	G	A	Pts	PIM
1986–87	Delbarton School	NJ-HS	—	—	—	—	—	—	—	—	—	—
1987–88	Delbarton School	NJ-HS	—	—	—	—	—	—	—	—	—	—
1988–89	Delbarton School	NJ-HS	—	—	—	—	—	—	—	—	—	—
1989–90	Delbarton School	NJ-HS	—	—	—	—	—	—	—	—	—	—
1990–91	Harvard	ECAC Hockey	25	3	14	17	12	—	—	—	—	—
1991–92	Harvard	ECAC Hockey	24	1	16	17	16	—	—	—	—	—
1992–93	Harvard	ECAC Hockey	16	3	9	12	10	—	—	—	—	—
1993–94	Harvard	ECAC Hockey	31	6	32	38	14	—	—	—	—	—
1994–95	Fredericton Canadiens	AHL	52	6	14	20	19	17	0	4	4	4
1995–96	Fredericton Canadiens	AHL	4	0	2	2	2	3	0	1	1	0
NJ-HS totals			—	110	132	242	—	—	—	—	—	—
NCAA totals			96	13	71	84	52	—	—	—	—	—
AHL totals			56	6	16	22	21	20	0	5	5	4

== Awards and honors ==
Award	Year
All-ECAC Hockey Second Team	1993–94
AHCA East Second-Team All-American	1993–94
ECAC Hockey All-Tournament Team	1994
