= Jame Pollock =

Canadian ice hockey player

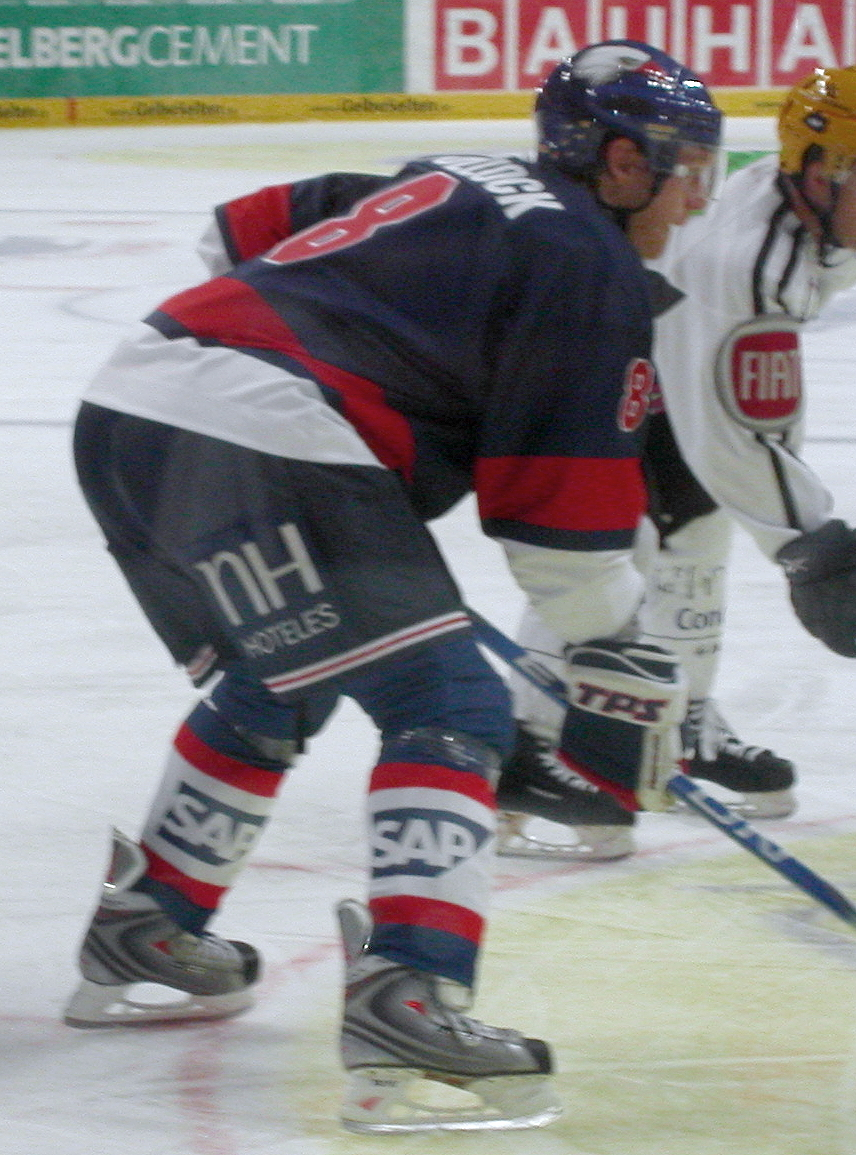
- Born: June 16, 1979 (age 46) Quebec City, Quebec, Canada
- Height: 6 ft 2 in (188 cm)
- Weight: 207 lb (94 kg; 14 st 11 lb)
- Position: Defence
- Shot: Right
- Played for: St. Louis Blues
- National team: Canada
- NHL draft: 106th overall, 1997; St. Louis Blues
- Playing career: 1999–2014

Jame Pollock (born June 16, 1979) is a Canadian former professional ice hockey defenceman. Pollock was born in Quebec City, Quebec, but grew up in Victoria, British Columbia.

== Playing career ==
Pollock was drafted in the fourth round, 106th overall, in the 1997 NHL entry draft by the St. Louis Blues. After playing four seasons in the Western Hockey League for the Seattle Thunderbirds, Pollock joined the Blues' American Hockey League affiliate, the Worcester IceCats.

He spent five seasons with the IceCats, and debuted in the National Hockey League with the Blues during the 2003–04 season. Pollock appeared in nine games with the Blues, recording no points. Pollock was an All Star defenceman on Canada's winning Spengler Cup team in 2003.

During the 2004–05 NHL lockout, Pollock went to Switzerland's Nationalliga A and played for the Kloten Flyers and HC Lugano. He remained in Europe for the 2005–06 season, joining the DEL's Nürnberg Ice Tigers where he played for two seasons leading Nurnberg to the DEL Finals in 2007. During that season, he set a record for the most goals in a season by a defenceman and played for Canada as they won the World Cup.

On July 5, 2007, Pollock was signed by the Washington Capitals to a two-way deal but left the Capitals minor league team, the Hershey Bears, in December 2007 to play with CSKA Moscow in the Russian Superleague. In the inaugural season of the Kontinental Hockey League, Pollock returned to Russia and played with HC MVD in the 2008–09 season.

On April 6, 2009, he transferred from MVD to the Deutsche Eishockey Liga with top club Adler Mannheim. After two seasons with Mannheim, Pollock returned to his original German club Nürnberg Ice Tigers, signing a one-year contract on June 6, 2011.

== Career statistics ==
			Regular season					Playoffs
Season	Team	League	GP	G	A	Pts	PIM	GP	G	A	Pts	PIM
1995–96	Seattle Thunderbirds	WHL	32	0	1	1	15	—	—	—	—	—
1996–97	Seattle Thunderbirds	WHL	66	15	19	34	94	15	3	5	8	16
1997–98	Seattle Thunderbirds	WHL	66	11	36	47	78	5	0	1	1	17
1998–99	Seattle Thunderbirds	WHL	59	10	32	42	78	11	3	4	7	8
1999–00	Worcester IceCats	AHL	56	12	12	24	50	9	5	3	8	6
2000–01	Worcester IceCats	AHL	55	15	8	23	36	11	1	7	8	10
2001–02	Worcester IceCats	AHL	71	23	43	66	89	3	1	0	1	2
2002–03	Worcester IceCats	AHL	44	5	17	22	50	3	1	0	1	2
2003–04	Worcester IceCats	AHL	44	8	24	32	52	7	1	4	5	14
2003–04	St. Louis Blues	NHL	9	0	0	0	6	—	—	—	—	—
2004–05	Kloten Flyers	NLA	26	4	8	12	34	—	—	—	—	—
2004–05	HC Lugano	NLA	—	—	—	—	—	2	0	1	1	8
2005–06	Nürnberg Ice Tigers	DEL	52	8	11	19	130	4	1	0	1	10
2006–07	Nürnberg Ice Tigers	DEL	46	22	32	54	78	13	5	9	14	46
2007–08	Hershey Bears	AHL	16	1	7	8	32	—	—	—	—	—
2007–08	CSKA Moscow	RSL	22	4	6	10	30	6	1	4	5	8
2008–09	HC MVD	KHL	44	10	14	24	86	—	—	—	—	—
2009–10	Adler Mannheim	DEL	46	9	17	26	52	2	0	1	1	0
2010–11	Adler Mannheim	DEL	44	5	10	15	36	6	1	1	2	2
2011–12	Thomas Sabo Ice Tigers	DEL	44	13	17	30	103	—	—	—	—	—
2012–13	Thomas Sabo Ice Tigers	DEL	46	8	18	26	82	3	1	2	3	2
NHL totals			9	0	0	0	6	—	—	—	—	—
