= Worcester IceCats =

Former American ice hockey team

- City: Worcester, Massachusetts
- League: American Hockey League
- Operated: 1994–2005
- Home arena: Worcester Centrum
- Colors: Teal, blue, silver
- Affiliates: St. Louis Blues (NHL), Ottawa Senators (NHL), New York Islanders (NHL)

Franchise history
- 1932–1935: Quebec Beavers
- 1935–1951: Springfield Indians
- 1951–1954: Syracuse Warriors
- 1954–1967: Springfield Indians
- 1967–1974: Springfield Kings
- 1974–1994: Springfield Indians
- 1994–2005: Worcester IceCats
- 2005–2013: Peoria Rivermen
- 2013–2021: Utica Comets
- 2021–present: Abbotsford Canucks

Championships
- Regular season titles: 1: (2000–01)
- Division titles: 2: (1996–97, 2000–01)

The Worcester IceCats were a professional ice hockey team in the American Hockey League. They played in Worcester, Massachusetts, at the Worcester Centrum (Renamed to the DCU Center in 2004). In 2005 the team was renamed the Peoria Rivermen and moved to Peoria, Illinois.

== History ==
The IceCats got their start when original New York Islanders owner Roy Boe purchased the Springfield Indians AHL franchise and moved it to Worcester in the summer of 1994. The team began play in the Fall of 1994 with a collection of free-agent players but as yet with no National Hockey League team affiliation. Immediately following the end of the 1994–95 season, Boe and head coach/General Manager Jim Roberts closed an affiliation deal with the St. Louis Blues. From that point on the IceCats would be the Blues' premier minor league team. The Peoria Rivermen of the East Coast Hockey League, in turn, became the IceCats' minor league affiliate in 1998, having been with St. Louis before the 1994 Worcester deal. During the 2000–01 season, Boe sold the IceCats to the St. Louis Blues. The team celebrated its tenth season in the AHL in fall 2003.

On November 9, 2004, the St. Louis Blues announced the sale of the IceCats to the owners of their ECHL affiliate, the Peoria Rivermen. The new owners moved the franchise to Peoria, Illinois, for the 2005–06 season.

This franchise was previously known as: Springfield Indians (1926–1994)
The franchise became known as: Peoria Rivermen (2005–2013)
This franchise was replaced by: Worcester Sharks (2006–2015)

Affiliates:

- St. Louis Blues (1995–2005)
- New York Islanders (1995–1996)
- Ottawa Senators (1996–1998)

== Season-by-season results ==
=== Regular season ===
Season	Games	Won	Lost	Tied	OTL	SOL	Points	Goals for	Goals against	Standing
1994–95	80	24	45	11	0	—	59	234	300	6th, North
1995–96	80	36	28	12	4	—	88	242	244	2nd, North
1996–97	80	43	23	9	5	—	100	256	234	1st, New England
1997–98	80	34	31	9	6	—	83	267	268	4th, New England
1998–99	80	34	36	8	2	—	78	237	260	4th, New England
1999–2000	80	34	31	11	4	—	83	249	250	3rd, New England
2000–01	80	48	20	9	3	—	108	264	205	1st, New England
2001–02	80	39	33	7	1	—	86	245	218	3rd, North
2002–03	80	35	27	15	3	—	88	235	220	3rd, North
2003–04	80	37	27	13	3	—	90	207	186	3rd, Atlantic
2004–05	80	39	34	3	4	—	85	212	223	5th, Atlantic

=== Playoffs ===
Season	1st round	2nd round	3rd round	Finals
1994–95	Did not qualify			
1995–96	L, 1–3, Portland	—	—	—
1996–97	L, 2–3, Providence	—	—	—
1997–98	W, 3–1, Springfield	L, 3–4, Hartford	—	—
1998–99	L, 1–3, Providence	—	—	—
1999–2000	W, 3–1, Portland	L, 1–4, Hartford	—	—
2000–01	W, 3–1, Lowell	L, 3–4, Providence	—	—
2001–02^{†}	L, 1–2, Manitoba^{†}	—	—	—
2002–03	L, 0–3, Binghamton	—	—	—
2003–04	W, 4–2, Manchester	L, 0–4, Hartford	—	—
2004–05	Did not qualify			

^{†} Lost in preliminary round.

== Team records ==
=== Single season ===
- Goals: 38 Eric Boguniecki and Justin Papineau (2001–2002)
- Assists: 46 Eric Boguniecki (2001–2002)
- Points: 84 Eric Boguniecki (2001–2002)
- Penalty minutes: 337 Sylvain Blouin (1999–2000)
- GAA: 2.13 Curtis Sanford (2003–2004)
- SV%: 0.929 Dwayne Roloson (2000–2001)

=== Career ===
- Career goals: 79 Marc Brown
- Career assists: 154 Terry Virtue
- Career points: 210 Terry Virtue
- Career penalty minutes: 1083 Terry Virtue
- Career goaltending wins: 65 Curtis Sanford
- Career shutouts: 10 Curtis Sanford
- Career games: 455 Terry Virtue

=== Franchise scoring leaders ===
These are the top ten point-scorers in IceCat's franchise history.

Note: Pos = Position; GP = Games played; G = Goals; A = Assists; Pts = Points;

Player	Pos	GP	G	A	Pts
Terry Virtue	D	455	56	154	210
Jame Pollock	D	270	63	104	167
Marc Brown	LW	303	79	81	160
Eric Boguniecki	C	141	69	86	155
Jeff Panzer	C	210	62	84	146
Justin Papineau	C	162	66	77	143
Stephane Roy	C	208	61	78	139
Daniel Corso	C	187	54	85	139
Marty Reasoner	C	122	57	68	125
Blake Evans	C	253	52	73	125

== Team captains ==
- Jim Nesich, 1994–1995
- Roy Mitchell, 1995–1996
- David Williams, 1996–1997
- Terry Virtue, 1997–1998
- Ricard Persson, 1997–1998
- Geoff Smith, 1998–1999
- Jason Widmer, 1998–2000
- Bryan Helmer, 1999–2000
- Ed Campbell, 2000–2002
- Eric Nickulas, 2002–2003
- Jeff Panzer, 2003–2004
- Mike Mottau, 2004–2005

== Notable IceCats ==
- Eric Boguniecki
- Jim Campbell
- Rory Fitzpatrick
- Michal Handzuš
- Jochen Hecht
- Barret Jackman
- Andreas Johansson
- Brent Johnson
- Jamal Mayers
- Jay McClement
- Jamie McLennan
- Mike Mottau
- Ladislav Nagy
- Tyson Nash
- Justin Papineau
- Marty Reasoner
- Pascal Rheaume
- Dwayne Roloson
- Mark Rycroft
- Bryce Salvador
- Curtis Sanford
- Steve Staios
- Mike Van Ryn
- Dennis Wideman
- Terry Virtue
