= Omaha Mavericks men's ice hockey statistical leaders =

The Omaha Mavericks men's ice hockey statistical leaders are individual statistical leaders of the Omaha Mavericks men's ice hockey program in various categories, including goals, assists, points, and saves. Within those areas, the lists identify single-game, single-season, and career leaders. The Mavericks represent the University of Nebraska Omaha in the NCAA's National Collegiate Hockey Conference.

Omaha began competing in intercollegiate ice hockey in 1997. These lists are updated through the end of the 2020–21 season.

== Goals ==
Career
Rk	Player	Goals	Seasons
1	Scott Parse	79	2003–04 2004–05 2005–06 2006–07
2	Austin Ortega	70	2013–14 2014–15 2015–16 2016–17
3	David Brisson	65	1999–00 2000–01 2001–02 2002–03
4	Jeff Hoggan	61	1998–99 1999–00 2000–01 2001–02
5	Josh Archibald	58	2011–12 2012–13 2013–14
6	Taylor Ward	57	2018–19 2019–20 2020–21 2021–22
7	Brandon Scero	55	2004–05 2005–06 2006–07 2007–08
8	Mick Lawrence	51	2004–05 2005–06 2006–07 2007–08
9	Ryan Walters	50	2010–11 2011–12 2012–13 2013–14
10	Bryan Marshall	49	2004–05 2005–06 2006–07 2007–08

Season
Rk	Player	Goals	Season
1	Josh Archibald	29	2013–14
2	Bill Thomas	27	2005–06
3	Jeff Hoggan	24	2001–02
	Scott Parse	24	2006–07
5	David Brisson	22	2000–01
	Ryan Walters	22	2012–13
7	Mick Lawrence	21	2007–08
	Austin Ortega	21	2015–16
9	Scott Parse	20	2005–06
	Austin Ortega	20	2014–15
	Austin Ortega	20	2016–17
	David Pope	20	2017–18

Single Game
Rk	Player	Goals	Season	Opponent
1	Brandon Scero	4	2006–07	Niagara
2	Brady Risk	3	2024–25	Colorado College
	Zach Urdahl	3	2023–24	North Dakota
	Jack Randl	3	2022–23	Alaska
	Taylor Ward	3	2021–22	Long Island
	Brock Bremer	3	2020–21	Colorado College
	Taylor Ward	3	2019–20	Western Michigan
	Kevin Conley	3	2019–20	Western Michigan
	David Pope	3	2017–18	St. Cloud State
	Zach Jordan	3	2017–18	Minnesota Duluth
	Austin Ortega	3	2016–17	Wisconsin
	Josh Archibald	3	2013–14	Miami
	Dominic Zombo	3	2013–14	St. Cloud State
	Josh Archibald	3	2013–14	North Dakota
	Josh Archibald	3	2012–13	Colorado College
	Joey Martin	3	2010–11	North Dakota
	Terry Broadhurst	3	2009–10	Ohio State
	Brandon Scero	3	2006–07	Bowling Green
	Scott Parse	3	2006–07	Bowling Green
	Bryan Marshall	3	2006–07	Bowling Green
	Bill Thomas	3	2005–06	Alabama-Huntsville
	Alex Nikiforuk	3	2005–06	Army
	Bryan Marshall	3	2004–05	Alaska Fairbanks
	Andrew Wong	3	2003–04	Massachusetts
	Allan Carr	3	2000–01	Alaska Fairbanks
	Jason Cupp	3	1997–98	Union

== Assists ==
Career
Rk	Player	Assists	Seasons
1	Scott Parse	118	2003–04 2004–05 2005–06 2006–07
2	Bryan Marshall	101	2004–05 2005–06 2006–07 2007–08
3	Tyler Weiss	88	2018–19 2019–20 2020–21 2021–22 2022–23
4	Eddie DelGrosso	85	2006–07 2007–08 2008–09 2009–10
5	Ryan Walters	84	2010–11 2011–12 2012–13 2013–14
6	Andrew Wong	80	2000–01 2001–02 2002–03 2003–04
7	David Brisson	79	1999–00 2000–01 2001–02 2002–03
	Jake Guentzel	79	2013–14 2014–15 2015–16
9	Greg Zanon	77	1999–00 2000–01 2001–02 2002–03
10	Dan Charleston	73	2005–06 2006–07 2007–08 2008–09

Season
Rk	Player	Assists	Season
1	Scott Parse	41	2005–06
2	Scott Parse	30	2004–05
	Alex Nikiforuk	30	2006–07
	Bryan Marshall	30	2007–08
	Ryan Walters	30	2012–13
6	Andrew Wong	29	2001–02
7	Scott Parse	28	2006–07
	Eddie DelGrosso	28	2008–09
9	Jake Guentzel	27	2013–14
	Ryan Walters	27	2013–14
	Jake Guentzel	27	2015–16
	Austin Ortega	27	2016–17

Single Game
Rk	Player	Assists	Season	Opponent
1	Jason Smallidge	4	2020–21	Western Michigan
	Teemu Pulkkinen	4	2019–20	Arizona State
	David Pope	4	2017–18	Miami
	David Pope	4	2016–17	Colorado College
	Matt White	4	2012–13	Alaska Anchorage
	Brock Montpetit	4	2012–13	Alabama Huntsville
	John Kemp	4	2008–09	Yale
	Joey Martin	4	2008–09	Yale
	Bryan Marshall	4	2007–08	Alabama-Huntsville
	Bryan Marshall	4	2005–06	Lake Superior
	Alex Nikiforuk	4	2006–07	Niagara
	Scott Parse	4	2004–05	Lake Superior State
	Bryan Marshall	4	2005–06	Alabama-Huntsville
	Scott Parse	4	2005–06	Alabama-Huntsville
	Tomas Klempa	4	2005–06	Michigan State
	Andrew Wong	4	2002–03	Northern Michigan

== Points ==
Career
Rk	Player	Points	Seasons
1	Scott Parse	197	2003–04 2004–05 2005–06 2006–07
2	Bryan Marshall	150	2004–05 2005–06 2006–07 2007–08
3	David Brisson	144	1999–00 2000–01 2001–02 2002–03
4	Austin Ortega	139	2013–14 2014–15 2015–16 2016–17
5	Ryan Walters	134	2010–11 2011–12 2012–13 2013–14
6	Andrew Wong	120	2000–01 2001–02 2002–03 2003–04
7	Jake Guentzel	119	2013–14 2014–15 2015–16
8	Dan Charleston	116	2005–06 2006–07 2007–08 2008–09
	Tyler Weiss	116	2018–19 2019–20 2020–21 2021–22 2022–23
10	Taylor Ward	115	2018–19 2019–20 2020–21 2021–22

Season
Rk	Player	Points	Season
1	Scott Parse	61	2005–06
2	Scott Parse	52	2006–07
	Ryan Walters	52	2012–13
4	Bill Thomas	50	2005–06
5	Scott Parse	49	2004–05
6	David Brisson	47	2000–01
	Austin Ortega	47	2016–17
8	Jake Guentzel	46	2015–16
9	Jeff Hoggan	45	2001–02
	Bill Thomas	45	2004–05

Single Game
Rk	Player	Points	Season	Opponent
1	Brock Bremer	5	2020–21	Colorado College
	Jason Smallidge	5	2020–21	Western Michigan
	David Pope	5	2017–18	Miami
	Jake Guentzel	5	2015–16	Ohio State
	Scott Parse	5	2006–07	Bowling Green
	Alex Nikiforuk	5	2006–07	Niagara
	Bill Thomas	5	2005–06	Alabama-Huntsville
	Scott Parse	5	2005–06	Alabama-Huntsville
	Andrew Wong	5	2003–04	Massachusetts
	Greg Zanon	5	2002–03	Merrimack

== Saves ==
Career
Rk	Player	Saves	Seasons
1	Evan Weninger	3,260	2015–16 2016–17 2017–18 2018–19
2	Dan Ellis	3,125	2000–01 2001–02 2002–03
3	Simon Latkoczy	3,067	2022–23 2023–24 2024–25 2025–26
4	John Faulkner	2,595	2009–10 2010–11 2011–12 2012–13
5	Jerad Kaufmann	2,428	2005–06 2006–07 2007–08 2008–09
6	Isaiah Saville	2,102	2019–20 2020–21 2021–22
7	Ryan Massa	1,879	2011–12 2012–13 2013–14 2014–15
8	Chris Holt	1,720	2003–04 2004–05
9	Jeremie Dupont	1,701	2006–07 2007–08 2008–09 2009–10
10	Kendall Sidoruk	1,656	1997–98 1998–99 1999–00

Season
Rk	Player	Saves	Season
1	Dan Ellis	1,098	2001–02
2	Dan Ellis	1,054	2002–03
3	Evan Weninger	1,044	2018–19
4	Chris Holt	991	2004–05
5	Dan Ellis	976	2000–01
6	Simon Latkoczy	953	2023–24
7	Simon Latkoczy	952	2024–25
8	John Faulkner	931	2010–11
9	Evan Weninger	877	2017–18
10	Jerad Kaufmann	875	2005–06

Single Game
Rk	Player	Saves	Season	Opponent
1	Dan Ellis	53	2002–03	Ohio State
	Simon Latkoczy	53	2024–25	Minnesota
3	Jerad Kaufmann	51	2007–08	Alaska
4	Simon Latkoczy	50	2024–25	Minnesota-Duluth
5	Evan Weninger	49	2018–19	Minnesota Duluth
	Simon Latkoczy	49	2025–26	Colorado College
7	Simon Latkoczy	48	2024–25	Western Michigan
8	Chris Holt	47	2003–04	Ferris State
	Jerad Kaufmann	47	2008–09	Lake Superior
	Ryan Massa	47	2014–15	St. Cloud State
	Evan Weninger	47	2016–17	Wisconsin
	Simon Latkoczy	47	2025–26	Minnesota State
