= Omaha Mavericks men's ice hockey =

- Current season
- University: University of Nebraska Omaha
- Conference: NCHC
- Head coach: Mike Gabinet; 9th season, 135–131–17 (.507)
- Assistant coaches: Dave Noël-Bernier; Peter Aubry; Bennett Hambrook
- Arena: Baxter Arena; Omaha, Nebraska
- Colors: Crimson and black

NCAA tournament Frozen Four
- 2015

NCAA tournament appearances
- 2006, 2011, 2015, 2021, 2024

Current uniform

The Omaha Mavericks men's ice hockey team, also called the Nebraska Omaha Mavericks and UNO Mavericks, (Note: The school's athletic identity varies according to the source: The school historically used "Nebraska–Omaha" (with a dash or hyphen) or "UNO", but now brands its program as "Omaha". Its all-sports conference, The Summit League, has exclusively used "Omaha" since the school joined that league in 2012. The National Collegiate Hockey Conference now uses "Omaha" as well.; The non-hyphenated "Nebraska Omaha", which reflects the university's official name, was consistently used by the Western Collegiate Hockey Association during the school's tenure in that conference. The school's athletic program has never used this specific form.; National media tend to use the hyphenated "Nebraska-Omaha".) is a National Collegiate Athletic Association (NCAA) Division I college ice hockey program that represents the University of Nebraska Omaha. The Mavericks are a member of the National Collegiate Hockey Conference (NCHC). They play home games at Baxter Arena, an on-campus facility that opened in 2015. The Mavericks hockey program was started in 1997; the team has qualified for the NCAA tournament on five occasions, in 2006, 2011, 2015, 2021, and 2024. During the 2015 tournament, the team made their first appearance in the tournament semifinals, branded by the NCAA as the Frozen Four. The Mavericks competed in the Central Collegiate Hockey Association (CCHA) between 1999 and 2010 before joining the WCHA for the 2010–11 season. The Mavericks joined the National Collegiate Hockey Conference starting in the 2013–14 season along with fellow charter members Colorado College, the University of Denver, Miami University, the University of Minnesota Duluth, and the University of North Dakota, plus invited founding members St. Cloud State University and Western Michigan University.

== History ==
=== Early history (1995–1999) ===
In June 1995, the University of Nebraska Omaha began talks with local hockey supporters on the feasibility of a varsity men's ice hockey program. Shortly thereafter, the school re-hired long-time Athletic Director Don Leahy. Leahy returned to the school after a ten-year absence to start the hockey program. On May 1, 1996, the university announced that they would add a varsity men's ice hockey team for the 1997–98 season. Although the school was a Division II team in all other sports, UNO joined Division I for ice hockey. Season tickets went on sale shortly thereafter. By May 16 of that year, the university capped season ticket sales at 6,389 just two weeks after the university announced the creation of the team. The Omaha City Council, encouraged by the support for the Mavericks, approved an ice sheet for the Omaha Civic Auditorium shortly thereafter.

On June 26, 1996, Leahy hired Mike Kemp to be the first Maverick hockey coach. Kemp had spent the previous 14 years as an assistant and head recruiter for the University of Wisconsin, helping them to nine NCAA tournament appearances and a national championship in 1990. It was a return to Omaha for Kemp, who was the head coach for UNO's club hockey team in its brief existence in 1975 and 1976. Kemp hired former NHL first round draft choice David Quinn as his top assistant and head recruiter, and set about recruiting a team for the 1997 season. They establish the school's first Division I men's ice hockey program, which began playing during the 1997–98 NCAA Division I men's ice hockey season.

UNO played its first season as an Independent in 1997-98. On October 17, 1997, a sellout crowd at the Civic Auditorium saw the team for the first time in a 3–2 exhibition loss to the University of Manitoba. Despite a midseason ten-game losing streak, the Mavericks finished with an encouraging 12–18–3 record. The Mavericks earned a surprising sweep over traditional powerhouse Denver and a 4–3 road victory over Maine, a night after losing 11–0. The team sold out all 19 of their home games to finish second in the NCAA in attendance. Following UNO's first season, the Mavericks made the somewhat surprising decision to apply for membership to the Central Collegiate Hockey Association. Many expected the school to seek admission to the Western Collegiate Hockey Association, as the conference was a better geographic fit and included UNO's Division II North Central Conference rivals Minnesota State, North Dakota, and St. Cloud State. However, the school was intrigued by matchups against big-name foes like Michigan, Ohio State, and Notre Dame, and was accepted into the CCHA on June 24, 1998. UNO would become a full member of the conference starting with the 1999–2000 season. The Mavericks struggled in their second season as an independent, starting the season 2–18–0 en route to an 11–24–0 record. UNO won only one of seven games against future CCHA opponents, a 6–1 victory over Bowling Green. Despite the poor record, the school once again sold out all of its home games, finishing third in the NCAA in home attendance.

=== CCHA years (1999–2009) ===
UNO surprised many in the 1999–2000 season, its first in the CCHA. The team finished with a 10–12–6 record in the conference, good for seventh in the conference and a berth in the CCHA tournament. The Mavericks took the best-of-three first-round series at fourth-seeded Northern Michigan. In other first-round action, eighth-seeded Bowling Green upset Lake Superior State; the Falcons' victory meant that the Civic Auditorium would host a one-game playoff for the right to go to the CCHA Final Four. In front of a sellout raucous home crowd, the Mavericks won 3–1 in a game that became known in Maverick lore as simply "Tuesday Night". The Mavericks kept the Cinderella run alive at the Final Four, as they stunned top-seeded Michigan 7–4 in front of a pro-Michigan crowd at Joe Louis Arena. UNO entered the tournament final against Michigan State one game away from qualifying for the NCAA Tournament in their first year as a CCHA member. After the teams entered the first intermission scoreless, the Spartans scored three goals over a 5:29 span in the second period to break the game open en route to a 6–0 victory.

On the heels of their surprising run at the 2000 CCHA Tournament, the Mavericks began the season ranked number 13 in the USCHO.com Poll and number 14 in the USA Today poll, the first time the Mavericks had been nationally ranked in their short history. The Mavericks hosted the Maverick Stampede for the first time that year, a four-team season opening tournament that has been held in each year since 2000. The UNO topped Niagara in the tournament before falling to 4th-ranked Boston College in the final. Perhaps as a result of heightened expectations, the Mavericks struggled early in the season, falling to a season worst 6–8–0 at the end of November. The team eventually put things together, finishing with the school's first winning record at 24–15–3. After falling out of both polls by midseason, the Mavericks were ranked #13 in the final USCHO.com and USA Today polls, although they again came up just short of the then-12 team NCAA Tournament. The 24 victories are still a Maverick record for a single season. Sophomore David Brisson tallied 22 goals and 47 points, shattering the team record in both categories that he had set a year earlier (17, 32). Following the season, future NHLer Greg Zanon became the first Mav to be named an All-American, when the ACHA named him to their All-America Second Team.

The 2001–02 season was a mixture of success and disappointment for UNO. For the second consecutive year, UNO posted more than 20 wins, finishing 21–16–4. Zanon again was named second-team All-America; he was joined on the team by Jeff Hoggan, who topped Brisson's school record with 24 goals. However, the team again failed to qualify for the NCAA Tournament, a disappointment given that the team had been ranked as high as #5 in both major polls early in the season and returned its top four points scorers and future NHL goaltender Dan Ellis from the previous season's 24-win team.

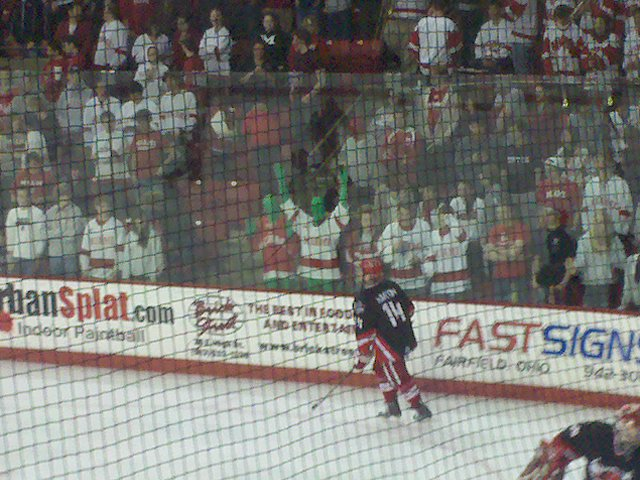
Maverick Forward Joey Martin skates before UNO's 4–2 road upset victory over #1 ranked Miami on February 20, 2010.

The Mavericks were unable to build on the consecutive winning seasons in the following years. In 2002–03, the team was within striking distance of a third consecutive winning season before limping to a 13–22–5 record after going winless in their last eight games. The 2002–03 would be the last in which UNO was a full-time tenant of the Civic Auditorium after selling out all 131 games that they played in the arena. Following the season, they would move to the newly constructed 14,700-seat Qwest Center Omaha. The following season, 2003–04, was the Mavericks' worst to date, as a young UNO team finished last in the conference with an 8–26–5 record. Despite this, the Mavericks continued to draw fans; although the team was unable to sell out the new arena, they finished fourth in the NCAA in attendance. The Mavericks rebounded the following season to finish 19–16–4. The team was led by a promising set of young players. Sophomore Scott Parse tallied a team-high 49 points, and freshman Bill Thomas added 45 more. Following the season, Thomas was named CCHA Freshman of the Year and Kemp was named CCHA Coach of the Year, the first two major awards in the program's history.

The 2005–06 season was UNO's most successful to date. The team used a ten-game unbeaten streak in January and February to finish 20–12–6 to earn their first-ever berth in the NCAA Tournament. Parse set team records with 41 assists and 61 points and was UNO's first Hobey Baker Award finalist. Following the season, Parse became the first Maverick selected as a first-team All-American and Conference Player of the Year. Thomas scored a team-record 27 goals, combining with Parse to form the most potent first line in UNO history. The two helped the Mavericks to 141 goals, the most in the CCHA. The team struggled defensively after the previous year's goaltender Chris Holt signed with the New York Rangers in the offseason. Walk-on freshman Jerad Kaufmann – the third-string goalie at the beginning of the season – eventually laid claim to the job. UNO's inexperience eventually got the best of the team, as they were dominated by Boston University in a 9–2 loss in the first round of the NCAA tournament. The Terriers broke open a 1–1 game with a six-goal second period to end UNO's first NCAA Tournament appearance. Once again, the Mavericks could not build on their successes in the following seasons, as they finished in the middle of the pack each year in the conference. The squad finished two games over .500 in 2006–07, followed by finishing two games under .500 for the next two seasons. In 2008–09, the team started out 12–4–3 – the best start in school history – before collapsing down the stretch and winning only three of their last 21 games.

=== WCHA years (2010–2013) ===
The disappointing 2008–09 season led many to speculate about the future of the program. On April 29, 2009, UNO hired former University of Nebraska linebacker Trev Alberts as athletic director. Alberts immediately began overhauling the hockey program. Kemp had one year remaining on his contract as coach and had little chance for an extension following the team's failure to build on the success of the 2006 NCAA Tournament team. Not willing to let go of the only coach the program had ever had, Alberts promoted Kemp to Associate Athletic Director and placed him in charge of the hockey program. Shortly thereafter, Alberts made a huge splash by hiring former North Dakota coaching great Dean Blais as head coach. With Blais on board, observers quickly began speculating that UNO would join the WCHA. With the men's side of College Hockey America breaking up following the 2009–10 season, Bemidji State submitted an application to be the WCHA's 11th member. The WCHA made it clear that they would only consider expansion in even numbers; rumors circulated that the conference coveted UNO. Within ten days of Blais's hiring, speculation was put to rest as the WCHA announced on June 23 that UNO (along with Bemidji State) would join the league for the 2010–11 season. The Mavericks once again finished in the middle of the conference in their final season in the CCHA, although they did finish with 20 wins for only the third time in school history, with a 20–16–6 record. The team struggled early in the season before finishing strong in Blais's first season with the team, finishing the regular season 10–3–1 over their last fourteen games before being stopped by Ferris State in the CCHA playoffs.

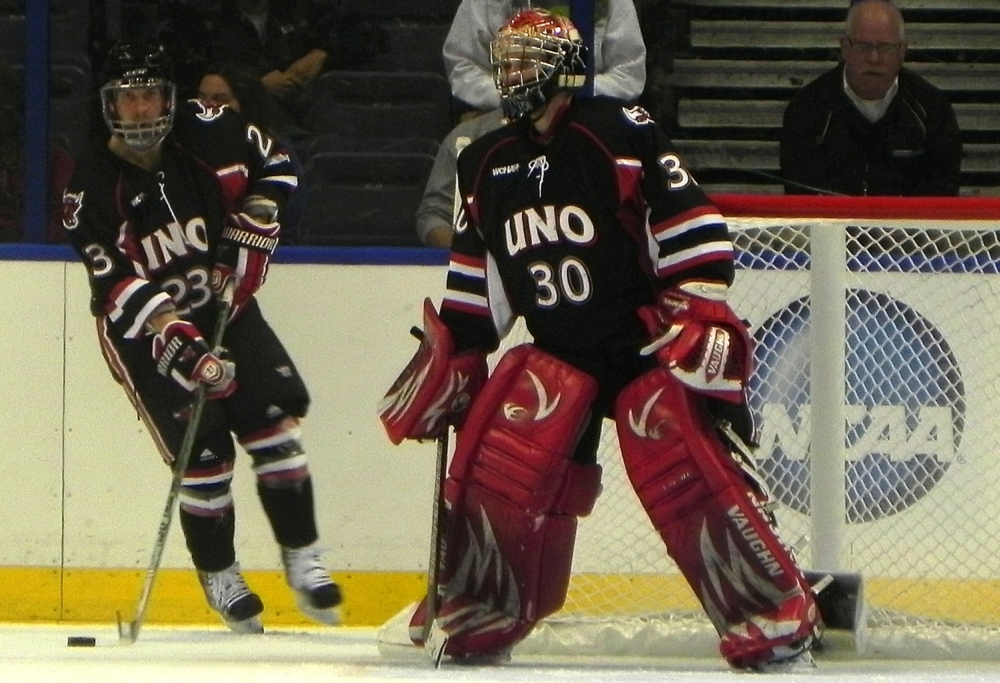
UNO Mavericks at the 2011 NCAA Tournament vs. Michigan on March 25, 2011.

UNO joined the WCHA as a full-time member starting with the 2010–11 season. The Mavericks started the season on a positive note, as they stunned Minnesota with a two-game sweep at Mariucci Arena in their first ever conference battle. UNO continued its hot start through the beginning of November by winning seven of their first eight games. The team was ranked #6 and #7 in the two major polls, their highest ranking since 2001. The Mavericks ended the regular season 3rd in the WCHA with a conference record of 17-9-2 and advanced to their first ever WCHA Tournament before being upset with a two-game sweep in the first round by 10th seeded Bemidji State. Despite the loss the Mavericks qualified for the 2011 NCAA Tournament ranked 14th in the National Pairwise rankings. UNO received a 3rd seed in the West Regional, located in St. Louis, Missouri and played 2nd seeded Michigan in the first round. The first period ended with UNO up 2-0 but the Wolverines rallied in the second period and both teams went scoreless in the third, sending the game to overtime. The Mavericks' season came to an end 2:35 into overtime after a shot off a faceoff by and rebound goal by Wolverine sophomore, Kevin Lynch, followed by a ten-minute review to confirm the goal.

== Season-by-season results ==
Source:

== Arenas ==
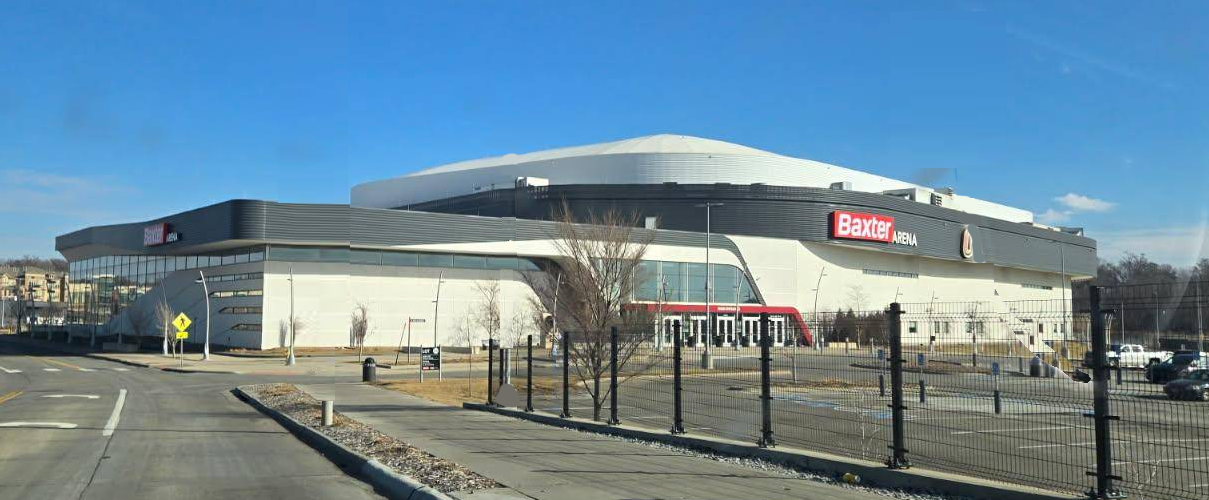
Baxter Arena

- Omaha Civic Auditorium (1997–2003)
- CenturyLink Center Omaha (2003–2015)
- Baxter Arena (2015–present)

UNO played at the Omaha Civic Auditorium in its first six years of existence (1997–2003). The school capped season ticket sales at just below 6,400 tickets within two weeks after the program's inception was announced in May 1996. The Mavericks eventually sold out the 8,314-seat arena 131 consecutive times between October 1997 and March 2003. Following the 2002–03 season, the team moved to what was then known as Qwest Center Omaha; in many of the Mavericks' 13 seasons at that arena, the Mavericks played one series in February at the Civic Auditorium when the Qwest Center hosted the Nebraska State High School Wrestling tournament.

Beginning in the 2003–04 season, the Mavericks played at the newly constructed 14,700-seat Qwest Center Omaha, now known as CenturyLink Center Omaha. The sleek, new modern arena immediately received rave reviews; one reporter dubbed the arena "the Omaha Civic Auditorium on steroids." Still, many fans were turned off by the new arena, complaining that the giant structure was not as intimate as the Civic Auditorium. Although UNO's hockey administration initially expected attendance to average about 11,000 fans, an average of only 8,184 fans filled the arena in the poor 2003–04 season. This number was still the fourth highest figure in the NCAA, but was actually down slightly from the average at the much smaller Civic Auditorium. Still, the modern arena became an important recruiting tool for the Mavericks coaching staff. Some of the team's best recruiting classes came in the years immediately following the move to the new arena, eventually helping the team to their first NCAA tournament appearance in 2006. In the years following the first season at the CenturyLink Center, attendance averaged between 5,500 and 6,900 per game, finishing in the top eleven in the NCAA each year, but never meeting initial attendance expectations.

The school had a lease at the CenturyLink Center through the 2012–13 season. By that time, athletic director Trev Alberts had been drumming up support for a new arena because of the unfavorable lease at the CenturyLink Center; the school lost $150,000 as part of the deal in 2008–09 after turning a $1 million profit in its last year at the Civic Auditorium in 2002–03. Rumors circulated that UNO planned to build an on-campus arena that seats between 7,000 and 8,000 fans. At the WCHA preseason media day in October 2010, coach Dean Blais told media members that the school hoped to break ground on an on-campus arena at some point in 2011.

The arena plans did not materialize until 2013, when the University of Nebraska system approved the construction of a venue that was known during its planning and initial construction stages as UNO Community Arena. The new facility, which holds slightly under 7,900 and also includes a dedicated practice facility, opened in October 2015 as Baxter Arena.

== Coaches ==
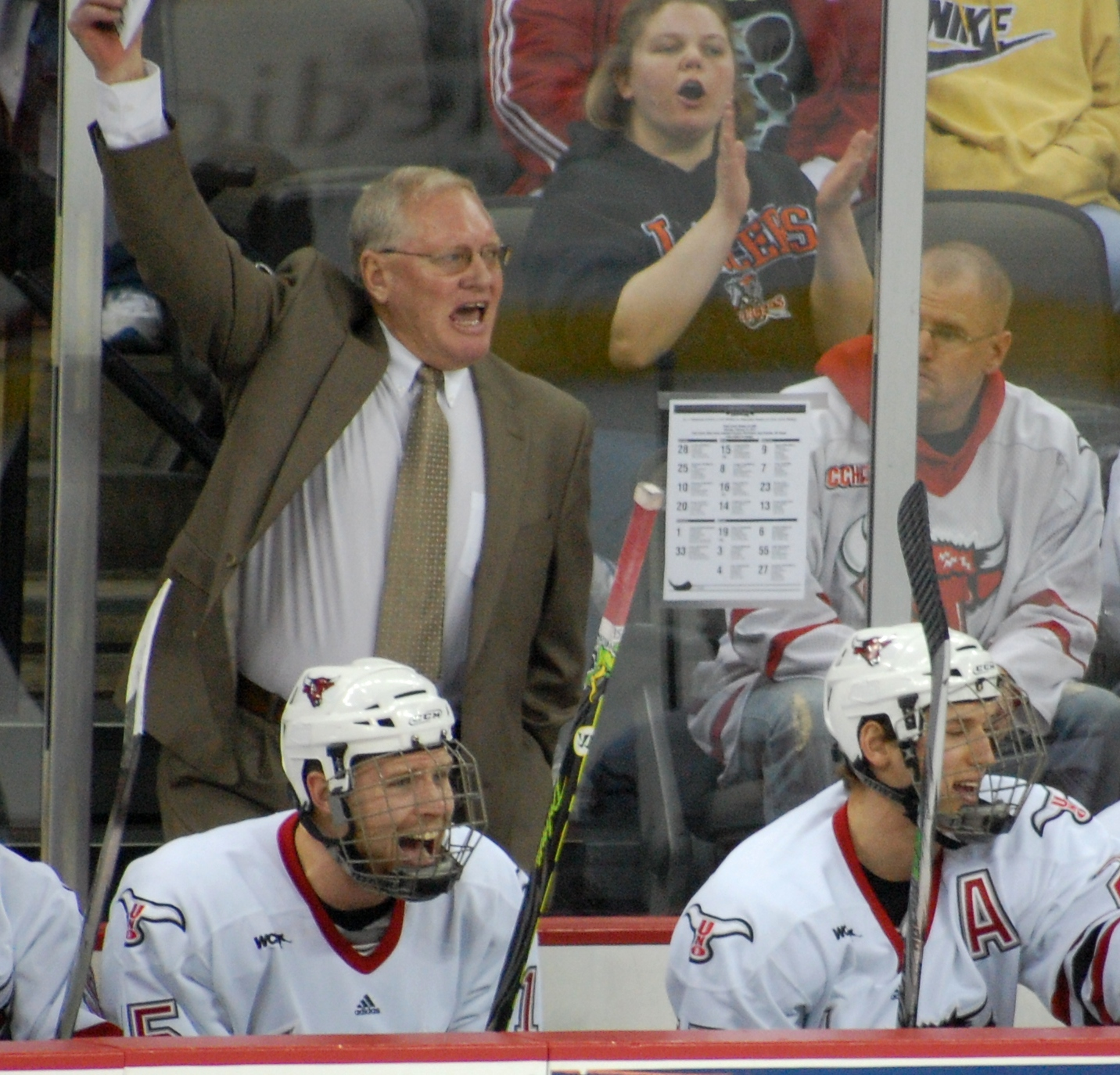
Dean Blais coaching a game for the Mavericks in 2011

The Mavericks were coached by Mike Kemp between the program's inception in 1997 and 2009. Prior to the 1997 season, Kemp served as an assistant coach for 14 years at Wisconsin. In his only previous head coaching stint, Kemp was the coach of the UNO club hockey team during its brief existence in 1975 and 1976. Kemp is credited with helping build the nascent program over his tenure, and eventually led the team to its only NCAA Tournament appearance to date in 2006. After the 2004–05 season, he was named CCHA Coach of the Year. He was named Associate Athletic Director for UNO following the 2009 season.

Dean Blais was hired in June 2009 to replace Mike Kemp on the UNO bench. Blais is best known as the former head coach at North Dakota from 1994 through 2004, where he won two national titles (1997 and 2000). Blais also served as assistant coach of the Columbus Blue Jackets from 2004 to 2007, and later as head coach and GM of the Fargo Force (USHL) from 2007 to 2009. During his first season at UNO, Blais also served as head coach of the gold medal winning USA team at the 2010 World Junior Ice Hockey Championships. During his second season at UNO, Blais was named WCHA Coach of the Year. Blais retired at the end of the 2016-17 season.

The Mavericks are currently coached by former Omaha player Mike Gabinet, who was named head coach April 5, 2017.

=== All-time coaching records ===
As of the completion of 2024–25 season

Tenure	Coach	Years	Record	Pct.
1997-2009	Mike Kemp	12	194–223–57	.469
2009–2017	Dean Blais	8	146–133–30	.521
2017–Present	Mike Gabinet	8	135–131–17	.507
Totals	3 coaches	28 seasons	475–487–106	.494

== Statistical leaders ==
=== Career points leaders ===
Player	Years	GP	G	A	Pts	PIM
Scott Parse	2003–2007	159	79	118	197	106
Bryan Marshall	2004–2008	147	49	101	150	79
David Brisson	1999–2003	159	65	79	144	112
Austin Ortega	2013–2017	147	70	69	139	66
Ryan Walters	2010–2014	152	50	84	134	136
Andrew Wong	2000–2004	153	40	80	120	100
Jake Guentzel	2013–2016	108	40	79	119	70
Dan Charleston	2005–2009	159	43	73	116	221
Taylor Ward	2018–2022	131	57	58	115	119
Brandon Scero	2004–2008	147	55	59	114	146

=== Career goaltending leaders ===
GP = Games played; Min = Minutes played; W = Wins; L = Losses; T = Ties; GA = Goals against; SO = Shutouts; SV% = Save percentage; GAA = Goals against average

Minimum 900 minutes

Player	Years	GP	Min	W	L	T	GA	SO	SV%	GAA
Ryan Massa	2011–2015	75	4098	32	27	9	169	4	.917	2.47
Dan Ellis	2000–2003	118	6900	53	50	12	309	7	.910	2.69
John Faulkner	2009–2013	116	6324	54	44	10	288	6	.900	2.73
Isaiah Saville	2019–2022	82	4668	38	36	5	216	5	.907	2.78
Rodney McLeod	2005–2009	23	1068	8	10	0	50	2	.902	2.81

Statistics current through the start of the 2021-22 season.

== Players ==
=== Current roster ===
As of August 13, 2025.

No.	Nat.	Player	Class	Pos	Height	Weight	DoB	Hometown	Previous team	NHL rights
1	(Canada)	Will Craig	Junior	G	6' 2" (1.88 m)	229 lb (104 kg)	2002-05-16	Ennismore, Ontario	New Mexico Ice Wolves (NAHL)	—
3	(Canada)	Landon Kosior	Junior	D	6' 0" (1.83 m)	190 lb (86 kg)	2002-08-15	Regina, Saskatchewan	Saskatchewan (CWUAA)	—
5	(United States)	Joe Gramer	Sophomore	D	6' 0" (1.83 m)	196 lb (89 kg)	2005-07-14	Moorhead, Minnesota	Des Moines Buccaneers (USHL)	—
7	(United States)	Griffin Ludtke (C)	Senior	D	5' 10" (1.78 m)	170 lb (77 kg)	2003-02-01	Elko, Minnesota	Sioux City Musketeers (USHL)	—
8	(Sweden)	Marcus Broberg	Sophomore	D	6' 0" (1.83 m)	204 lb (93 kg)	2003-10-23	Örebro, Sweden	Salmon Arm Silverbacks (BCHL)	—
9	(Canada)	Cameron Briere	Freshman	F	5' 10" (1.78 m)	163 lb (74 kg)	2005-11-05	Oakville, Ontario	Chicago Steel (USHL)	—
10	(Canada)	Jacob Guévin	Senior	D	5' 11" (1.8 m)	190 lb (86 kg)	2003-01-17	Drummondville, Quebec	Muskegon Lumberjacks (USHL)	—
11	(Canada)	Samuel Huo	Senior	F	6' 5" (1.96 m)	209 lb (95 kg)	2001-07-13	Richmond, British Columbia	British Columbia (CWUAA)	—
12	(Canada)	Luke Woodworth	Freshman	F	5' 9" (1.75 m)	163 lb (74 kg)	2004-04-01	Bridgewater, Nova Scotia	Drummondville Voltigeurs (QMJHL)	—
13	(Canada)	Jacob Slipec	Senior	F	5' 11" (1.8 m)	187 lb (85 kg)	2001-12-05	White Rock, British Columbia	Surrey Eagles (BCHL)	—
18	(Canada)	Myles Hilman	Sophomore	F	5' 9" (1.75 m)	194 lb (88 kg)	2003-10-15	Blackfalds, Alberta	Waterloo Black Hawks (USHL)	—
19	(Canada)	Sean Tschigerl	Sophomore	F	6' 0" (1.83 m)	190 lb (86 kg)	2003-04-11	Whitecourt, Alberta	Alberta (CWUAA)	ANA, 130th overall 2021
21	(United States)	Tyler Rollwagen (A)	Senior	F	5' 11" (1.8 m)	194 lb (88 kg)	2001-03-20	Bloomington, Minnesota	Fargo Force (USHL)	—
22	(Canada)	Aidan de La Gorgendiere	Sophomore	D	6' 1" (1.85 m)	183 lb (83 kg)	2002-02-22	Abbotsford, British Columbia	Alberta (CWUAA)	—
23	(Canada)	Maxime Pellerin	Sophomore	F	6' 0" (1.83 m)	181 lb (82 kg)	2003-02-18	Victoriaville, Quebec	McGill (OUA)	—
24	(Canada)	Marc Lajoie	Sophomore	D	6' 6" (1.98 m)	223 lb (101 kg)	2003-05-21	St. Albert, Alberta	Alberta (CWUAA)	—
25	(Canada)	Cam Mitchell (A)	Senior	F	5' 9" (1.75 m)	181 lb (82 kg)	2001-03-09	Stony Plain, Alberta	Omaha Lancers (USHL)	—
26	(Canada)	Joel Plante	Freshman	F	5' 11" (1.8 m)	161 lb (73 kg)	2005-06-26	Langley, British Columbia	Portland Winterhawks (WHL)	—
29	(United States)	Chase LaPinta	Sophomore	F	5' 9" (1.75 m)	170 lb (77 kg)	2004-02-10	Frisco, Texas	Sioux Falls Stampede (USHL)	—
30	(Slovakia)	Šimon Latkoczy (C)	Senior	G	5' 11" (1.8 m)	177 lb (80 kg)	2002-06-01	Trenčín, Slovakia	Madison Capitols (USHL)	—
38	(Canada)	Trevor Wong	Sophomore	F	5' 9" (1.75 m)	159 lb (72 kg)	2003-05-04	Vancouver, British Columbia	Saskatchewan (CWUAA)	—
44	(Canada)	Spencer Sova	Freshman	D	6' 1" (1.85 m)	190 lb (86 kg)	2004-01-10	Windsor, Ontario	Brampton Steelheads (OHL)	—
71	(Canada)	Brett Hyland	Sophomore	F	5' 11" (1.8 m)	194 lb (88 kg)	2003-02-18	Edmonton, Alberta	Alberta (CWUAA)	WSH, 200th overall 2023
72	(Canada)	Marcus Nguyen	Freshman	F	5' 10" (1.78 m)	181 lb (82 kg)	2004-08-02	Calgary, Alberta	Brandon Wheat Kings (WHL)	—
73	(Canada)	Dawson Cowan	Freshman	G	6' 2" (1.88 m)	187 lb (85 kg)	2005-09-28	Warren, Manitoba	Spokane Chiefs (WHL)	—
86	(Canada)	Jérémy Loranger	Freshman	F	5' 9" (1.75 m)	161 lb (73 kg)	2007-06-15	Trois-Rivières, Quebec	Sherwood Park Crusaders (BCHL)	CBJ, 198th overall 2025

== Awards and honors ==
=== NCAA ===
==== All-Americans ====
AHCA First Team All-Americans

- 2005-06: Scott Parse, F
- 2013-14: Josh Archibald, F

AHCA Second Team All-Americans

- 2000-01: Greg Zanon, D
- 2001-02: Greg Zanon, D; Jeff Hoggan, F
- 2006-07: Scott Parse, F
- 2012-13: Ryan Walters, F
- 2016-17: Luc Snuggerud, D; Austin Ortega, F

=== CCHA ===
==== Individual awards ====
Player of the Year

- Scott Parse: 2006

Rookie of the Year

- Bill Thomas: 2005

Best Offensive Defenseman

- Greg Zanon: 2001

Coach of the Year

- Mike Kemp: 2005

Scholar-Athlete of the Year

- Michael Eickman: 2006, 2007

Ilitch Humanitarian Award

- Jason Cupp: 2001
- Jerad Kaufmann: 2009

==== All-Conference Teams ====
First Team All-CCHA

- 2000–01: Greg Zanon, D; David Brisson, F
- 2001–02: Jeff Hoggan, F
- 2004–05: Scott Parse, F
- 2005–06: Scott Parse, F; Bill Thomas, F
- 2006–07: Scott Parse, F
- 2009–10: Eddie DelGrosso, D

Second Team All-CCHA

- 2001–02: Dan Ellis, G; Greg Zanon, D
- 2004–05: Bill Thomas, F
- 2007–08: Bryan Marshall, F
- 2008–09: Eddie DelGrosso, D

CCHA All-Rookie Team

- 1999–00: Greg Zanon, D; David Brisson, F
- 2000–01: Dan Ellis, G
- 2004–05: Joe Grimaldi, D; Bill Thomas, F
- 2006–07: Eddie DelGrosso, D
- 2009–10: Terry Broadhurst, F

=== WCHA ===
==== Individual awards ====
Coach of the Year

- Dean Blais: 2011

==== All-Conference Teams ====
First Team All-WCHA

- 1912–13: Ryan Walters, F

Third Team All-WCHA

- 2010–11: John Faulkner, G
- 2012–13: Andrej Šustr, D

WCHA All-Rookie Team

- 2011–12: Jayson Megna, F

=== NCHC ===
==== Individual awards ====
Player of the Year

- Josh Archibald: 2014

Rookie of the Year

- Taylor Ward: 2019

Forward of the Year

- Josh Archibald: 2014

Scholar-Athlete of the Year

- Justin Parizek: 2017
- Tyler Vesel: 2018

Goaltender of the Year

- Simon Latkoczy: 2025

==== All-Conference Teams ====
First Team All-NCHC

- 2013–14: Josh Archibald, F
- 2016–17: Austin Ortega, F
- 2017–18: David Pope, F
- 2024–25: Simon Latkoczy, G

Second Team All-NCHC

- 2014–15: Ryan Massa, G
- 2015–16: Jake Guentzel, F
- 2016–17: Luc Snuggerud, D
- 2018–19: Mason Morelli, F
- 2020–21: Chayse Primeau, F
- 2024–25: Sam Strange, F

NCHC All-Rookie Team

- 2013–14: Jake Guentzel, F
- 2014–15: Luc Snuggerud, D
- 2015–16: Evan Weninger, G
- 2018–19: Taylor Ward, F
- 2019–20: Brandon Scanlin, D; Joey Abate, F
- 2022–23: Joaquim Lemay, D; Jacob Guevin, D
- 2023–24: Tanner Ludtke, F

=== NCAA Record Holders ===
- Austin Ortega – Most game winning goals in a season (11, 2014–15)

== Omaha Mavericks Hall of Fame ==
The following is a list of people associated with the Omaha Mavericks men's ice hockey program who were elected into the Nebraska Omaha Athletic Hall of Fame (induction date in parentheses).

- Fred Abboud (2016)
- David Brisson (2010)
- Bryan Marshall (2018)
- Scott Parse (2016)

== Olympians ==
This is a list of Omaha alumni were a part of an Olympic team.

Name	Position	Omaha Tenure	Team	Year	Finish
Brian Cooper	Defenseman	2012–2016	(United States) USA	2022	5th
Fredrik Olofsson	Center	2015–2019	(Sweden) SWE	2022	4th
Jake Guentzel	Left Wing	2013–2016	(United States) USA	2026	Gold

== Mavericks in the NHL ==
As of July 1, 2025

= NHL All-Star team	= NHL All-Star	= NHL All-Star and NHL All-Star team	= Hall of Famer

Player	Position	Team(s)	Years	Games	Stanley Cups
Josh Archibald	Right Wing	PIT, ARI, EDM	2015–2023	305	1
Dan Ellis	Goaltender	DAL, NSH, TBL, ANA, CAR, FLA	2003–2015	212	0
Jake Guentzel	Left Wing	PIT, CAR, TBL	2016–Present	600	1
Jeff Hoggan	Wing	STL, BOS, PHO	2005–2010	107	0
Chris Holt	Goaltender	NYR, STL	2005–2009	2	0
Bryce Lampman	Defenseman	NYR	2003–2007	10	0
Victor Mancini	Defenseman	NYR, VAN	2023–Present	31	0
Jaycob Megna	Defenseman	ANA, SJS, SEA, CHI, FLA	2016–Present	193	0
Jayson Megna	Center	PIT, NYR, VAN, COL, ANA, BOS	2013–2024	204	0
Mason Morelli	Left Wing	VGK	2023–Present	10	0

Player	Position	Team(s)	Years	Games	Stanley Cups
Ty Mueller	Center	VAN	2024–Present	2	0
Fredrik Olofsson	Center	DAL, COL	2022–2024	85	0
Scott Parse	Right Wing	LAK	2009–2012	73	0
Brandon Scanlin	Defenseman	NYR	2023–2024	1	0
Nick Seeler	Defenseman	MIN, CHI, PHI	2017–Present	373	0
Anthony Stolarz	Goaltender	PHI, EDM, ANA, FLA, TOR	2016–Present	142	1
Andrej Šustr	Defenseman	TBL, ANA	2012–2022	361	0
Bill Thomas	Right Wing	PHO, PIT, FLA	2005–2012	87	0
Taylor Ward	Right Wing	LAK	2024–Present	1	0
Greg Zanon	Defenseman	NSH, MIN, BOS, COL	2005–2013	493	0

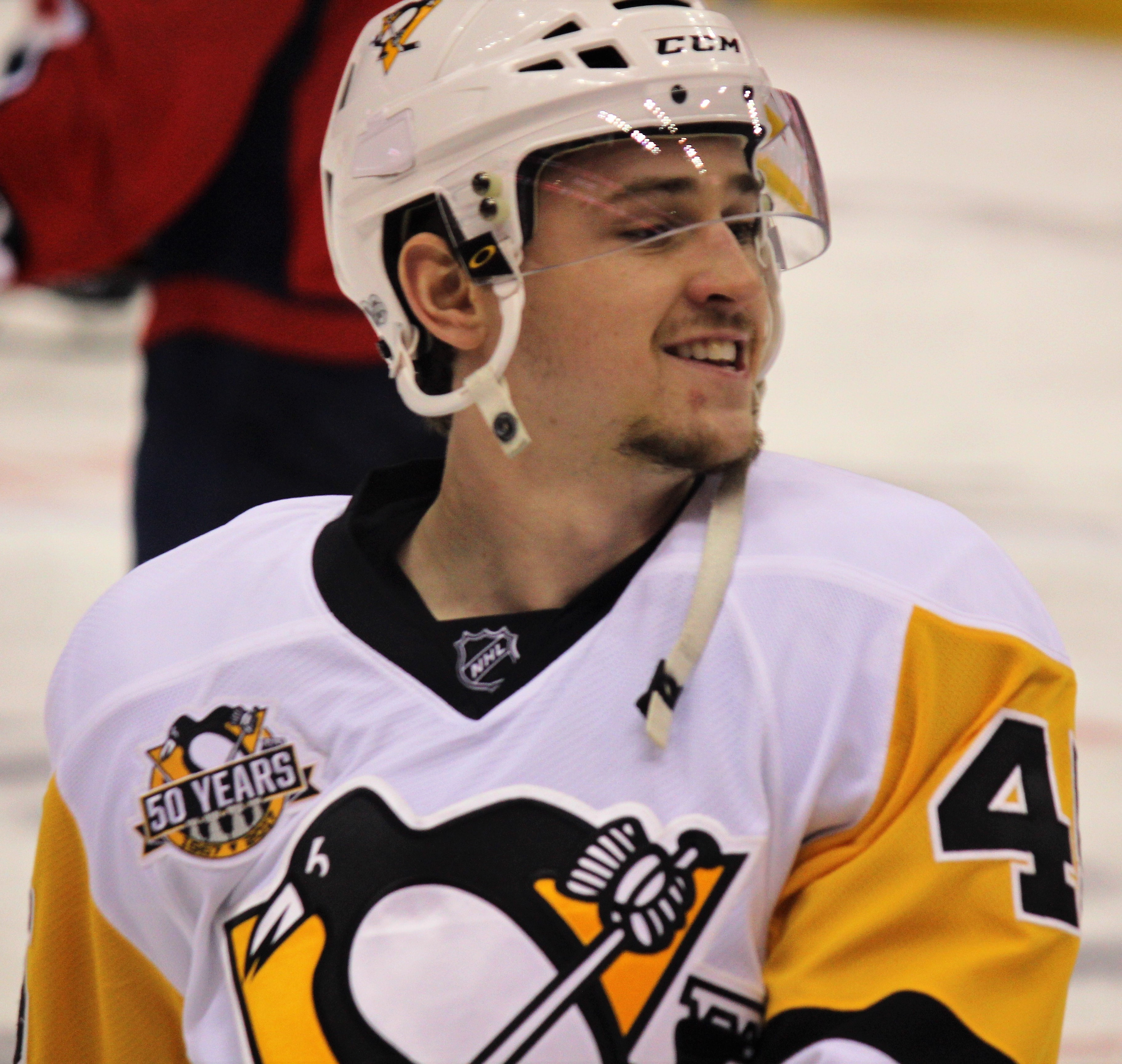
Josh Archibald

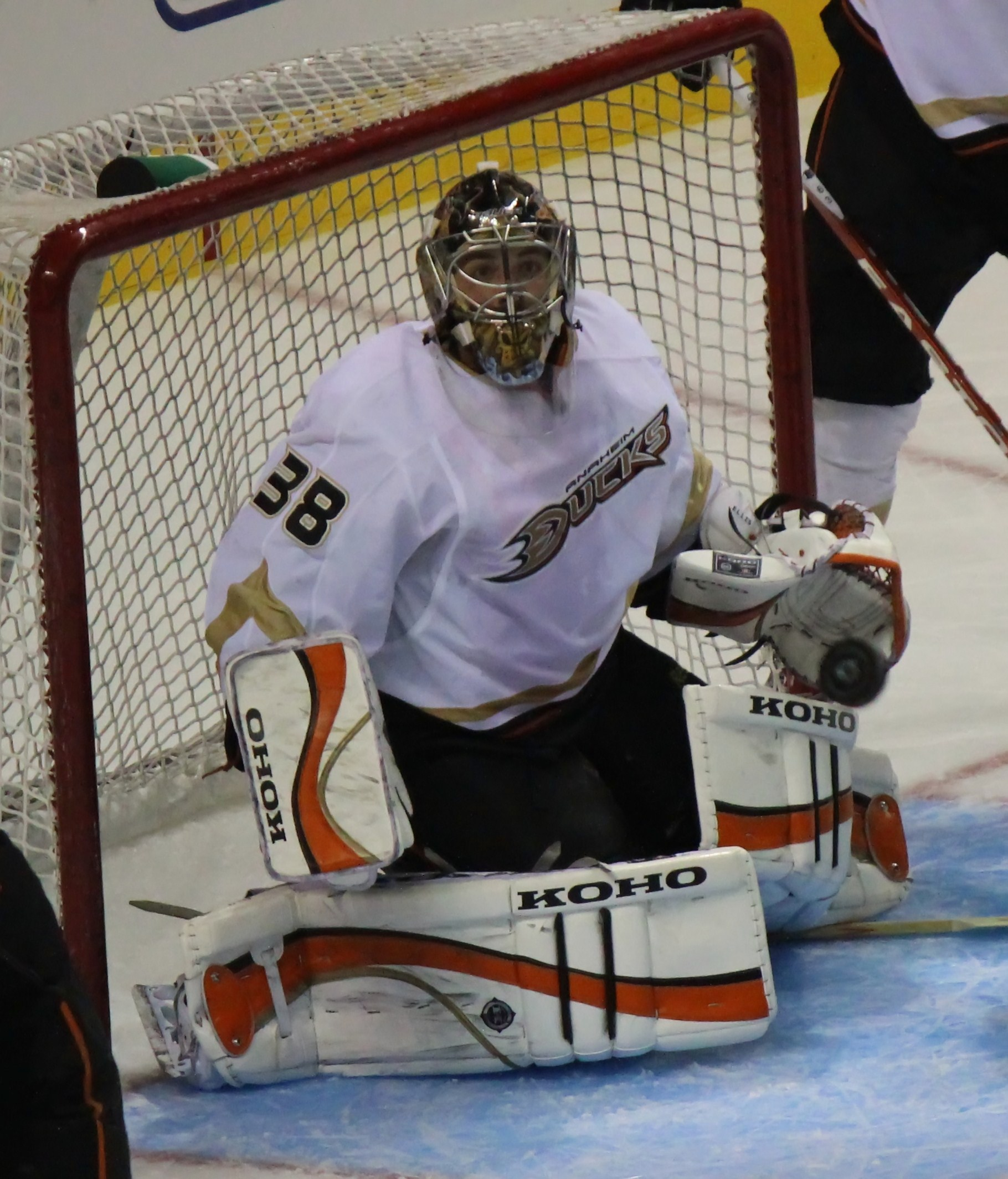
Dan Ellis

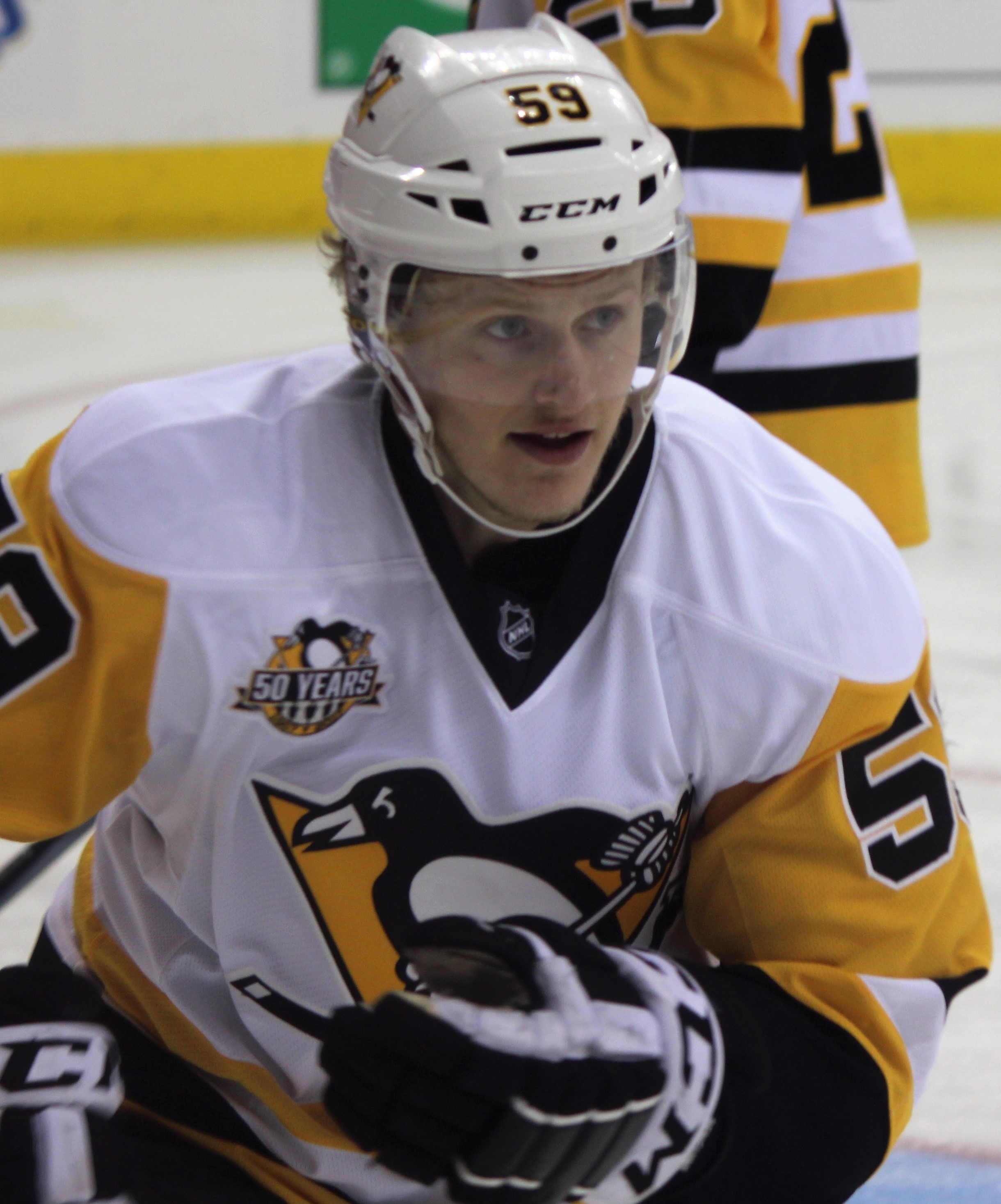
Jake Guentzel

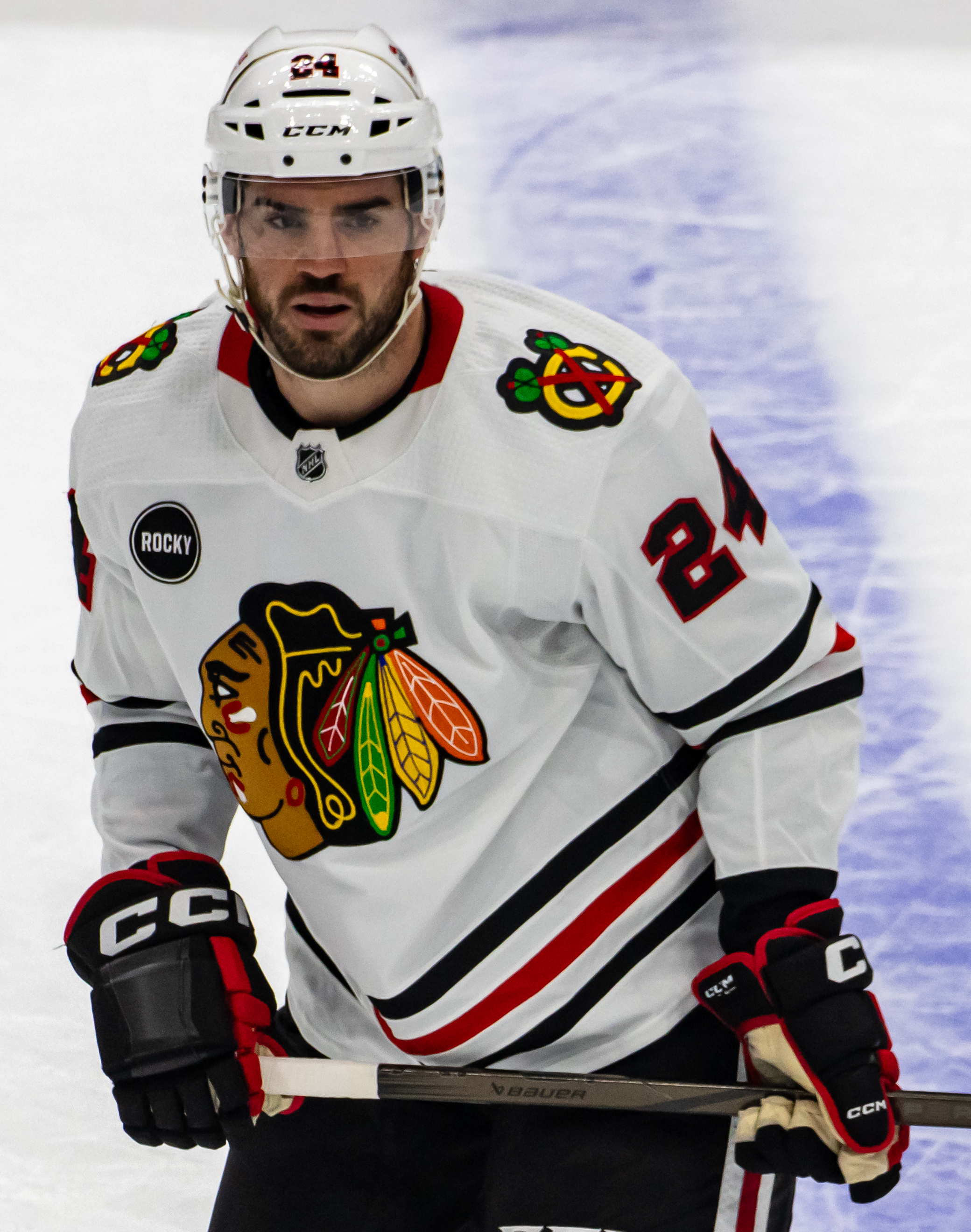
Jaycob Megna

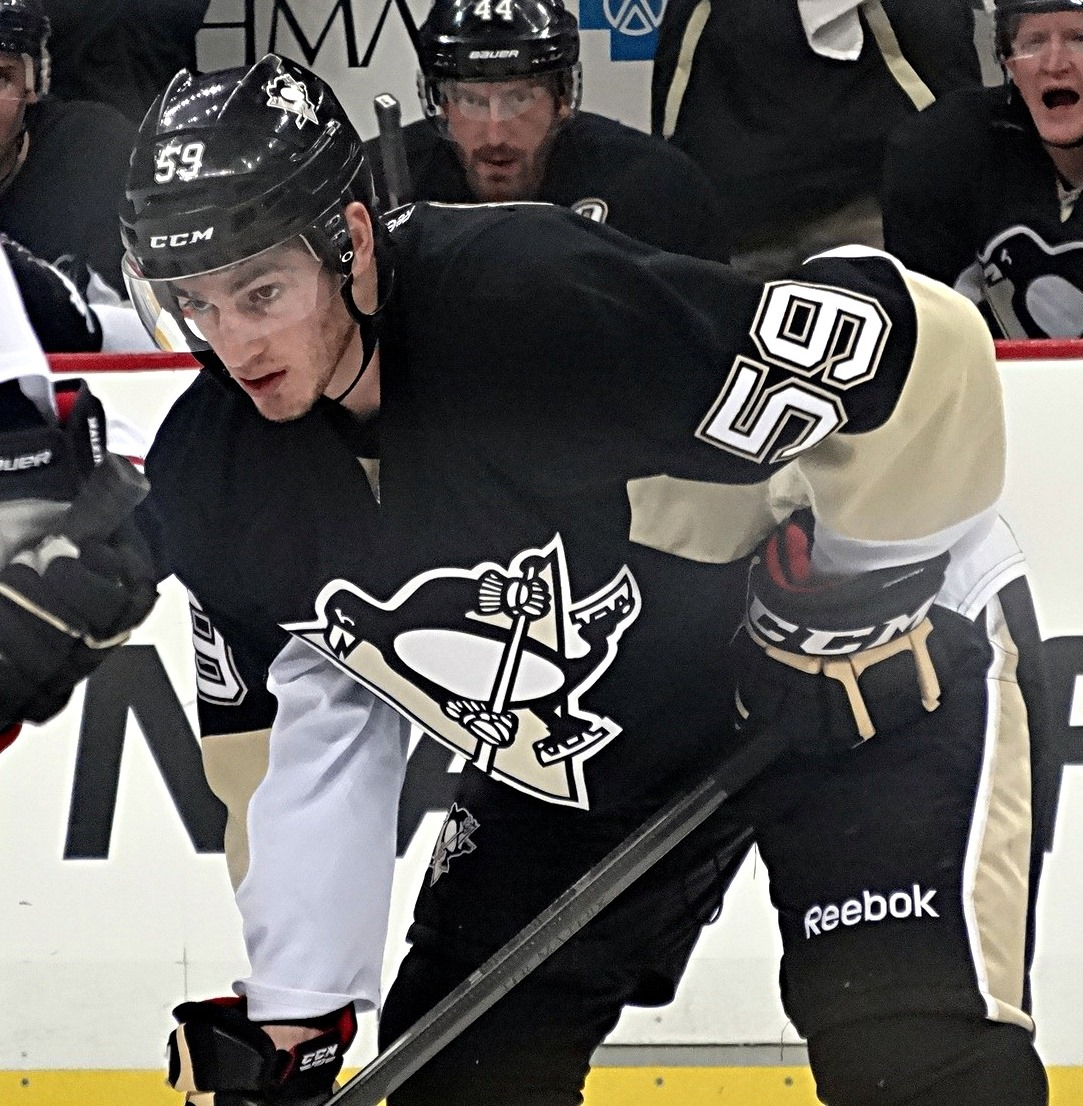
Jayson Megna

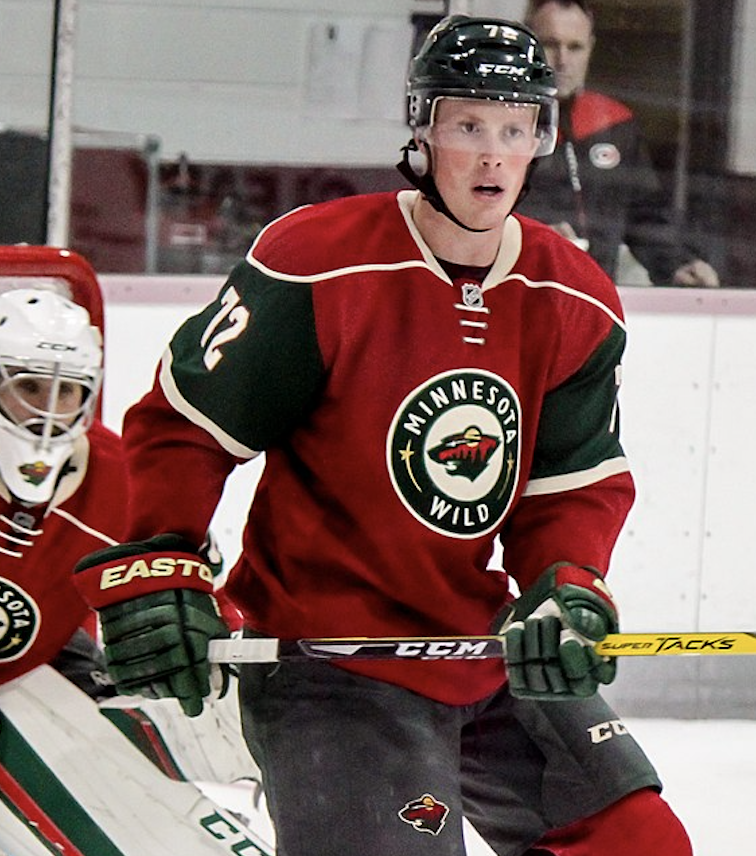
Nick Seeler

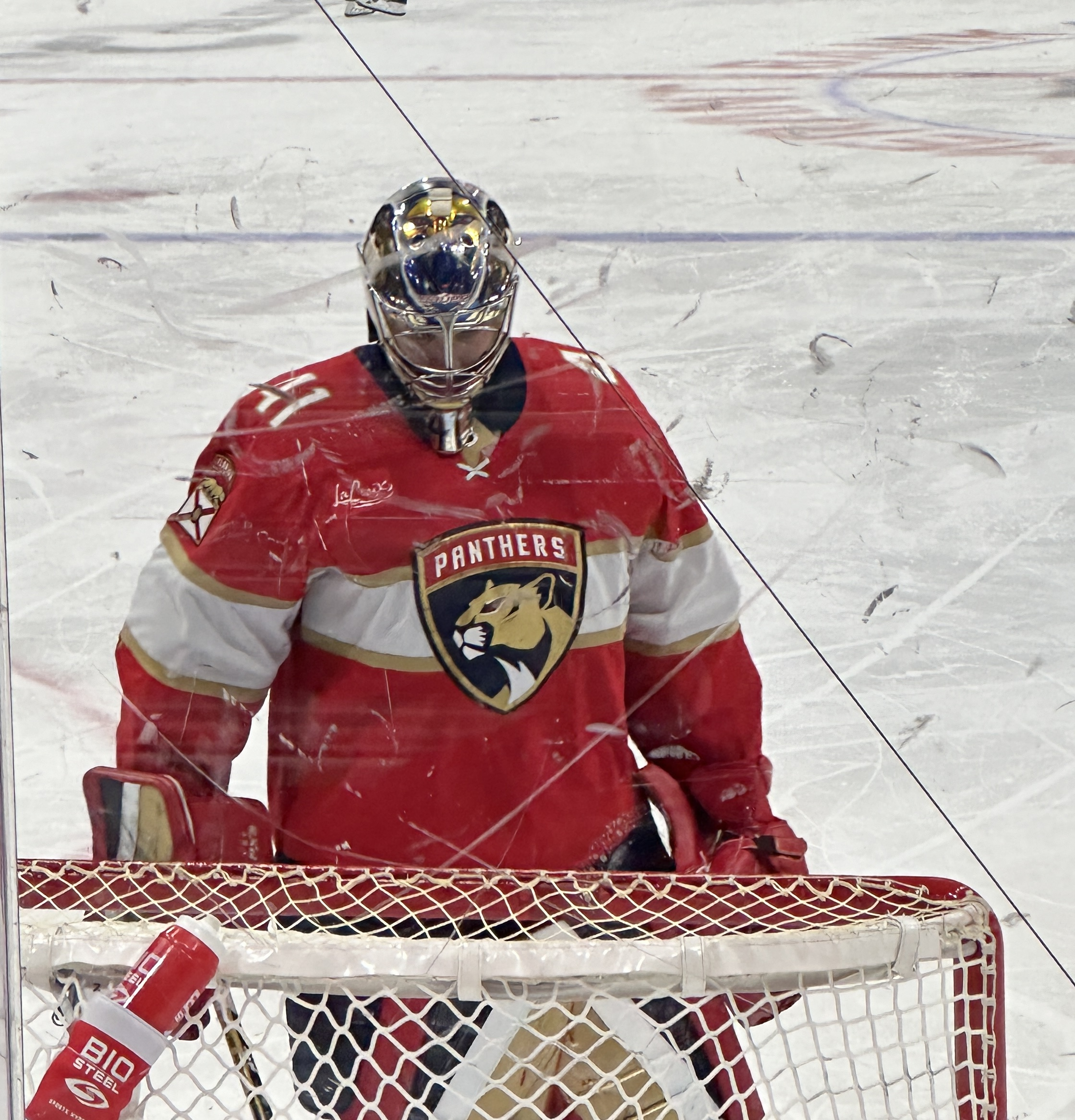
Anthony Stolarz

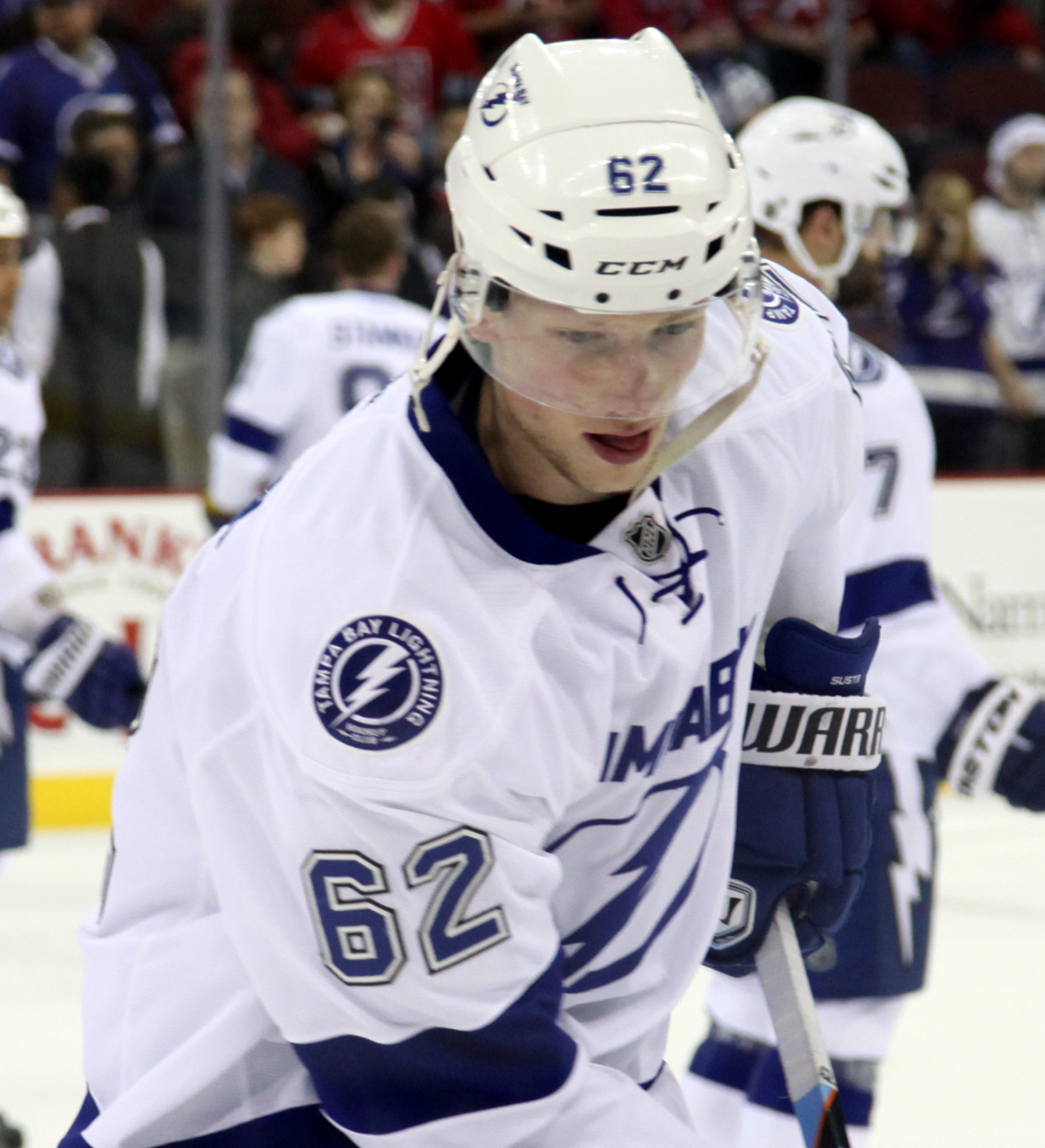
Andrej Šustr

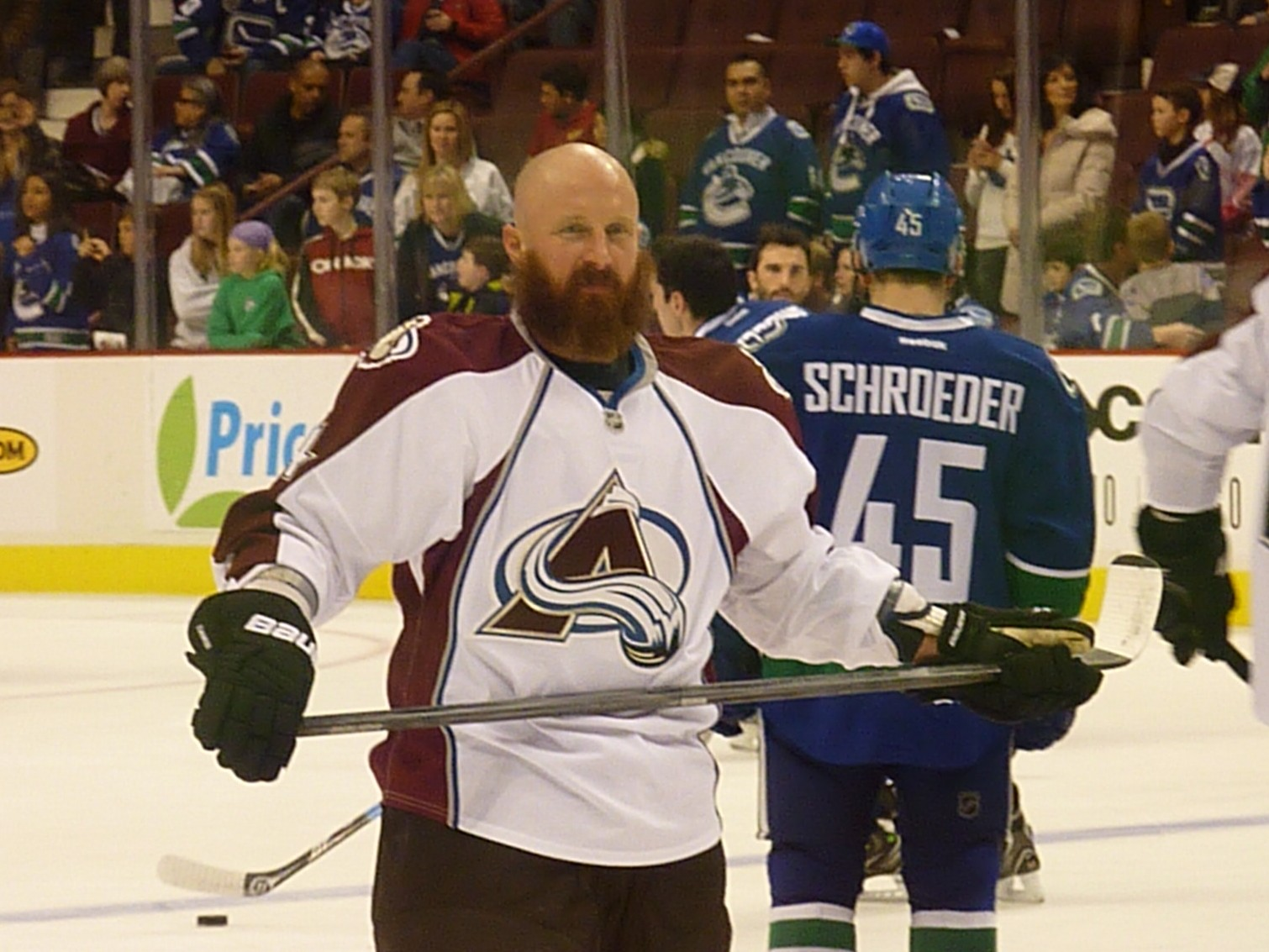
Greg Zanon

== School records ==
The following are the UNO school records. Statistics are accurate as of the conclusion of the 2017–18 season. Italics indicates player is still active.

=== Individual records ===
==== Career ====
- Most goals in a career: Scott Parse, 79 (2003–07)
- Most assists in a career: Scott Parse, 118
- Most points in a career: Scott Parse, 197
- Most power-play goals in a career: Brandon Scero, 26 (2004–08)
- Most penalty minutes in a career: Jeff Hoggan, 294 (1998–02)
- Most points in a career, defenseman: Eddie DelGrosso, 109 (2006–10)
- Most goals in a career, defenseman: Greg Zanon, 30 (1999–03)
- Most assists in a career, defenseman: Eddie Del Grosso, 85
- Most wins in a career: John Faulkner, 54 (2009–13)
- Most shutouts in a career: Dan Ellis, 7
- Highest save percentage in a career: Ryan Massa, .917
- Best goals against average in a career: Ryan Massa, 2.47 (2011–14)

==== Season ====
- Most goals in a season: Josh Archibald, 29 (2013–14)
- Most assists in a season: Scott Parse, 41 (2005–06)
- Most points in a season: Scott Parse, 61 (2005–06)
- Most power-play goals in a season: Mick Lawrence, 15 (2007–08)
- Most penalty minutes in a season: Cody Blanshan, 103 (2002–03)
- Most wins in a season: Dan Ellis, 21 (2000–01)
- Highest save percentage in a season: Ryan Massa, .939 (2014–15)
- Best goals against average in a season: Ryan Massa, 1.96 (2014–15)

==== Game ====
- Most goals in a game: Brandon Scero, 4 (10/20/06 vs. Niagara)
- Most assists in a game: 15 players tied with 4
- Most points in a game: 10 players tied with 5
- Most saves in a game: Dan Ellis, 53 (3/14/01 vs. Ohio State
- Most shots on goal in a game: Jeff Hogan, 14 (12/01/01 vs. Bowling Green)
- Most penalty minutes in a game: Matt Ambroz, 26 (12/18/10 vs. Colorado College)
- First goal scored in 1997 red and white game: Mike Hanson

=== Team records ===
==== Season ====
- Most wins in a season: 24 (2000–01)
- Fewest wins in a season: 8 (2003–04)
- Most goals in a season: 153 (2006–07)
- Fewest goals allowed in a season: 90 (2014–15)

==== Game ====
- Longest winning streak: 8 (1/11/02 to 2/2/02)
- Longest unbeaten streak: 10 (1/21/06 to 2/24/06)
- Most goals in a game: 11 (1/12/18 vs. Miami)
- Most goals in a period: 6 (2/14/98, third period vs. Minnesota State)
- Most goals against in a game: 11 (2/27/98 vs. Maine)
