= Austin Ortega =

American ice hockey player (born 1994)

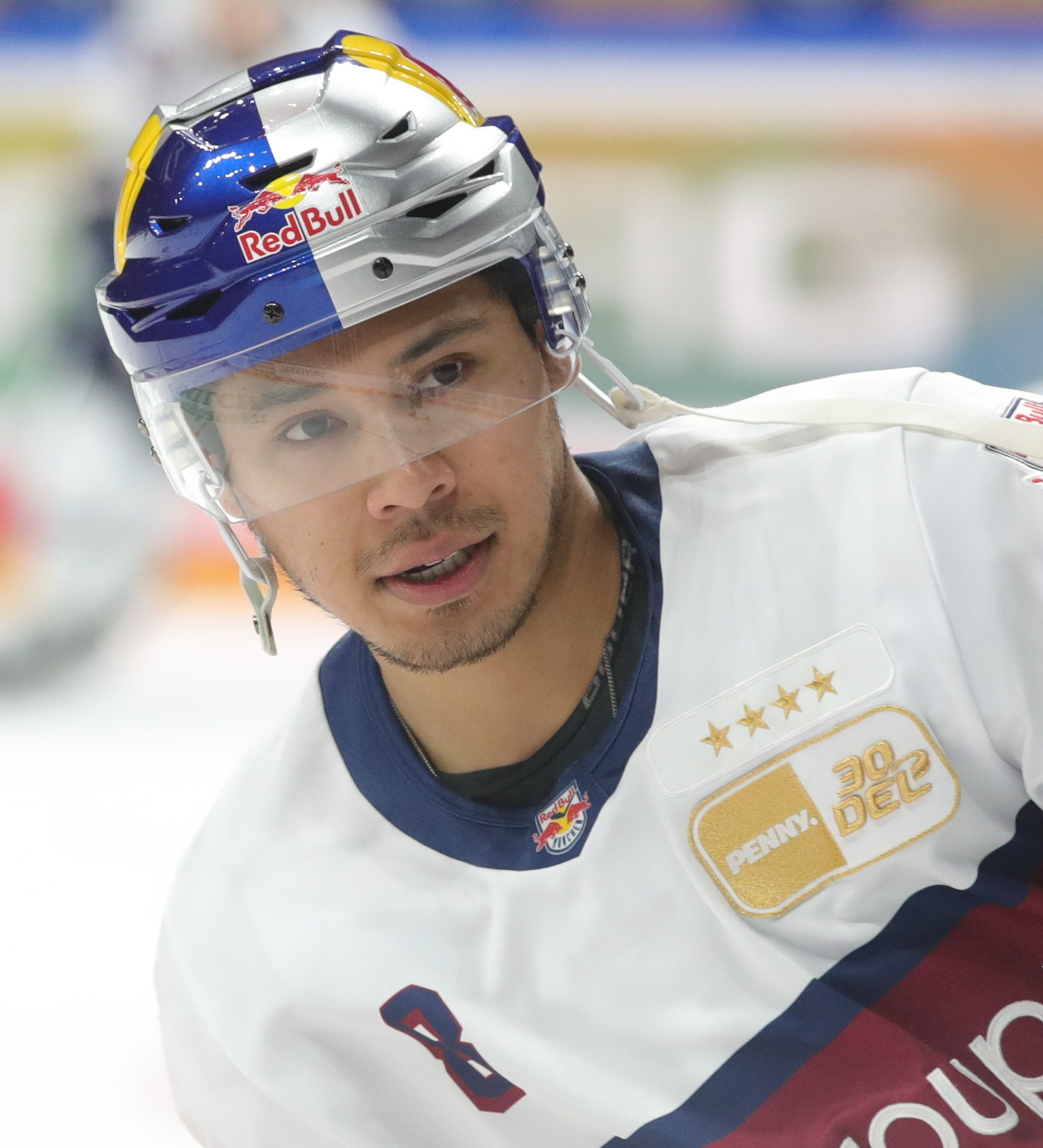
- Ortega with EHC Red Bull München in 2023
- Born: April 12, 1994 (age 31) Escondido, California, U.S.
- Height: 5 ft 8 in (173 cm)
- Weight: 174 lb (79 kg; 12 st 6 lb)
- Position: Right wing
- Shoots: Right
- DEL team Former teams: Adler Mannheim; San Diego Gulls; Eisbären Berlin; Växjö Lakers; HC TPS; EC Red Bull Salzburg; EHC München; HC Slovan Bratislava
- NHL draft: Undrafted
- Playing career: 2017–present

Austin Ortega (born April 12, 1994) is an American professional ice hockey right-winger currently playing for Adler Mannheim in the Deutsche Eishockey Liga (DEL). Born and raised in Escondido, California, Ortega began playing ice hockey at the age of five. He played four seasons of collegiate ice hockey for the Omaha Mavericks men's ice hockey team, setting an NCAA record for most game-winning goals. After spending his senior year as captain of the Mavericks, Ortega signed his first professional contract with the San Diego Gulls of the American Hockey League.

== Early life ==
Ortega was born on April 12, 1994, to parents Frank and Tessie Ortega in Escondido, California and is of Mexican and Filipino descent. Ortega first became interested in ice hockey after watching a game at the Escondido Ice-Plex at the age of five. From there, he convinced his parents to allow him to play the sport.

== Playing career ==
=== Collegiate ===
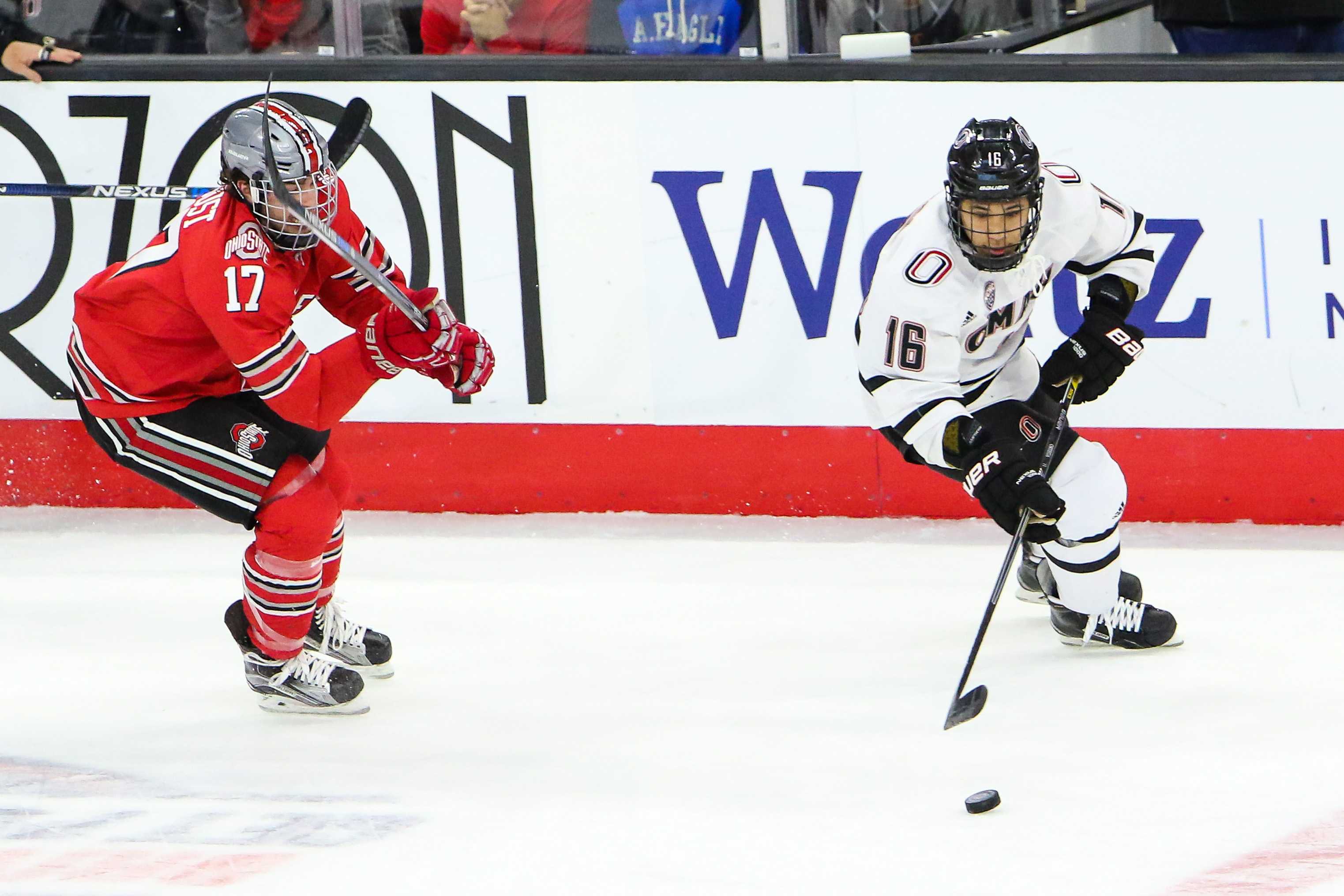
Ortega (right) during a game against Ohio State

Ortega played for the Omaha Mavericks men's ice hockey team from 2013 to 2017. In his freshman season, he scored the fastest goal to open a game in school history in a 6-0 win over Colorado College on February 28, 2014. Ortega concluded the season with a Bauer NCHC Rookie of the Week honor and was named to NCHC Academic All-Conference Team. The following year, Ortega set an NCAA record for most game-winning goals, surpassing Doug Weight's previous record of seven.

=== Professional ===
After spending his senior year as captain of the Mavericks, Ortega signed his first professional contract with the San Diego Gulls of the American Hockey League. He played two seasons with the Gulls before being assigned to the Utah Grizzlies in the ECHL. Within Ortega's first two months in the league, he was named the ECHL Player of the Month. Ortega eventually left North America and signed a contract with the Växjö Lakers of the Swedish Hockey League (SHL).

In February 2019, Ortega signed a contract with the Eisbären Berlin of the Deutsche Eishockey Liga (DEL) in Berlin, Germany for the remainder of the season. In his first weekend with the team, he recorded two goals and three assists. During an October 2019 pre-season game against the Chicago Blackhawks, play-by-play commentator Pat Foley said, "Ortega, who sounds like he ought to be a shortstop.” Although Ortega refused to speak to him after the game, he accepted Foley's apology. At the end of the 2019–20 season, the DEL agreed on a league-wide salary waiver for the following season as part of the licensing process. As a result, Ortega agreed to waive his contract and left the team.

His contract was terminated by TPS in October because "expectations were not met." At the time of his termination, Ortega had accumulated six points in 16 games.
