= Terry Broadhurst =

American professional ice hockey forward

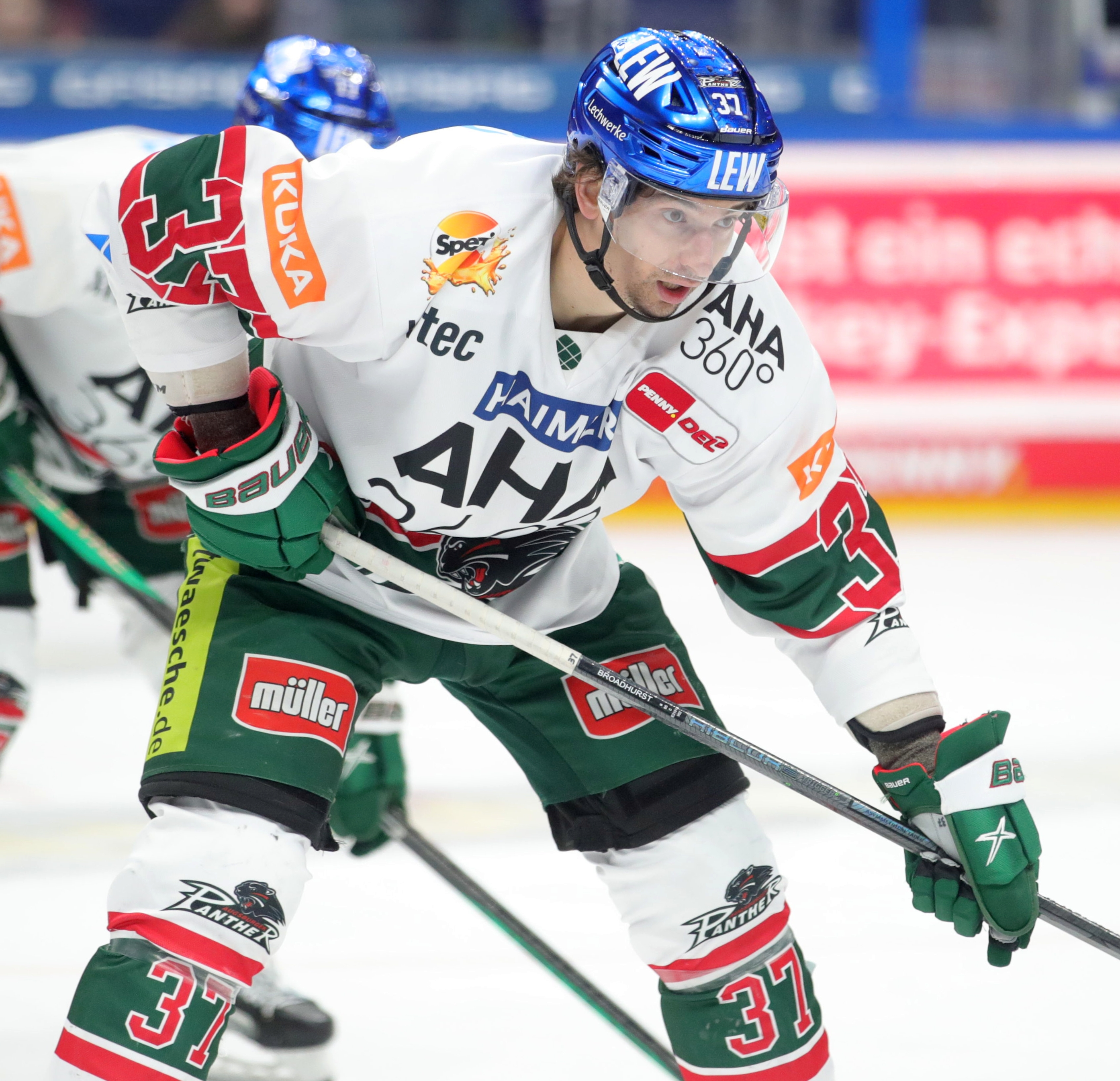
- Broadhurst in 2023
- Born: November 30, 1988 (age 37) Orland Park, Illinois, U.S.
- Height: 5 ft 11 in (180 cm)
- Weight: 170 lb (77 kg; 12 st 2 lb)
- Position: Left wing
- Shoots: Left
- ECHL team Former teams: Indy Fuel; Rockford IceHogs; Chicago Wolves; Skellefteå AIK; Brynäs IF; KooKoo; Cleveland Monsters; Charlotte Checkers; Bridgeport Sound Tigers; Tucson Roadrunners; Augsburger Panther; HC TPS; HK Poprad
- NHL draft: Undrafted
- Playing career: 2012–present

Terry Broadhurst (born November 30, 1988) is an American professional ice hockey forward. He is currently playing with the Indy Fuel in the ECHL.

== Playing career ==
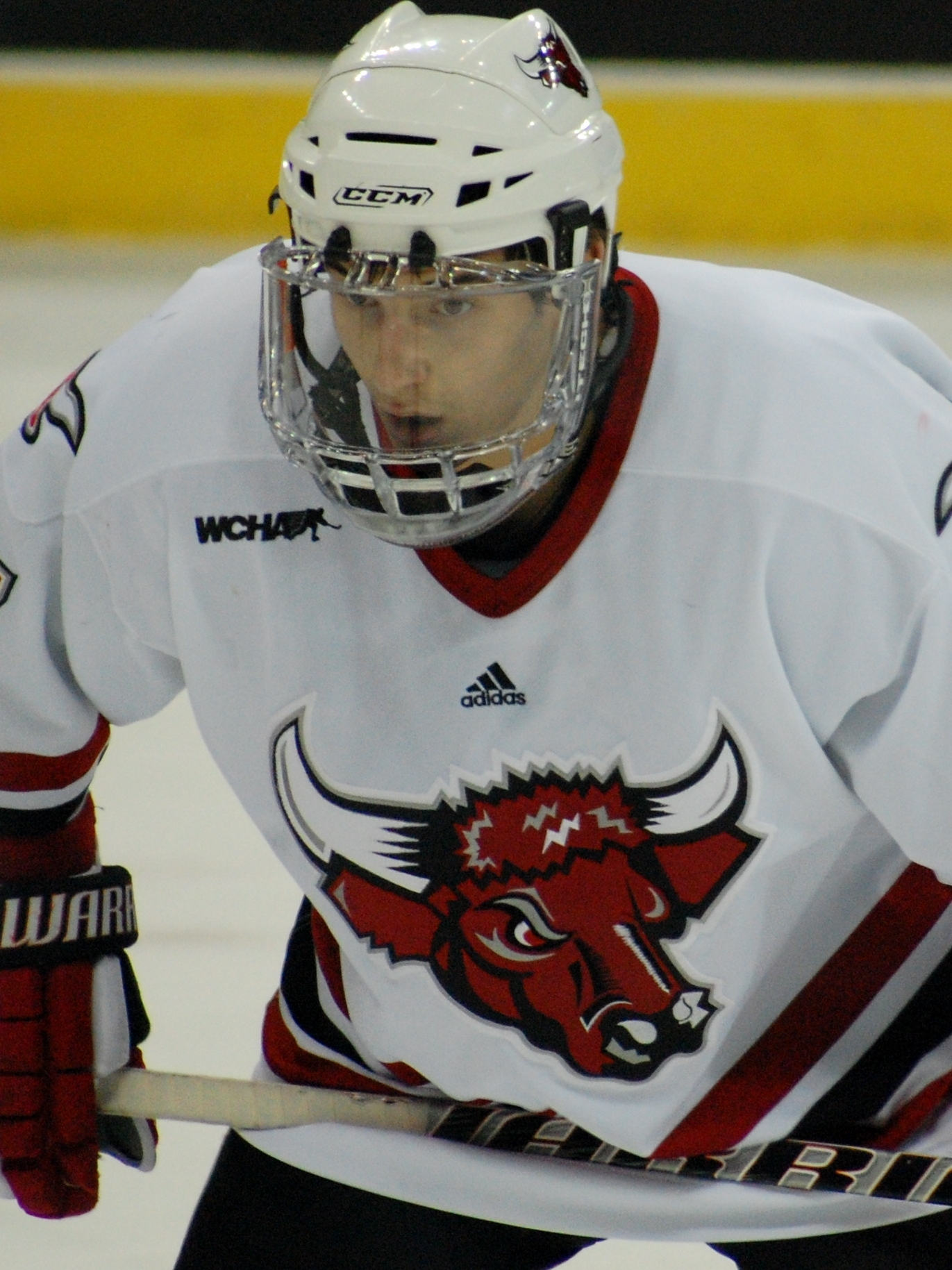
Broadhurst playing collegiate hockey for the Omaha Mavericks in 2010

After a successful college playing career with the Nebraska–Omaha Mavericks, Broadhurst signed a two-year entry-level deal with the Chicago Blackhawks of the National Hockey League (NHL) in 2012 and was assigned to the Rockford IceHogs. He split the following season between the IceHogs in the AHL and the Toledo Walleye in the ECHL. In 2013, he was joined by his younger brother Alex Broadhurst on the IceHogs.

After spending two full seasons with the IceHogs, Broadhurst left the Blackhawks organization as a free agent to sign a one-year AHL deal with the Chicago Wolves on July 30, 2014.

On July 10, 2015, Broadhurst signed his first contract abroad, agreeing to a one-year contract with Swedish club, Skellefteå AIK, of the Swedish Hockey League (SHL). He left Skellefteå in February 2016 and moved to fellow SHL side Brynäs IF where he played for the remainder of the season.

On May 18, 2016, he penned a deal with KooKoo of the Finnish top-flight Liiga. In the 2016–17 season, Broadhurst quickly adapted to the Finnish level securing a scoring line role in producing 14 goals and 36 points in 53 games.

As a free agent over the summer, Broadhurst opted to return to the AHL during the 2017–18 season, re-uniting with brother Alex in agreeing to a professional try-out deal with the Cleveland Monsters on October 30, 2017. Rediscovering his offensive touch, Broadhurst remained on the Monsters for the duration of the season, placing fourth in team scoring with 32 points in 49 games.

On August 8, 2018, Broadhurst returned to his original AHL club as a free agent, signing a one-year contract with the Rockford IceHogs. In 40 games with the IceHogs, Broadhurst added 4 goals and 12 points.

As a free agent entering the 2019–20 season, Broadhurst marked his 31st birthday by agreeing to a professional tryout contract with reigning AHL champions, the Charlotte Checkers, on November 30, 2019. After adding 4 assists in 23 games over the course of his tryout, Broadhurst was signed to an AHL contract for the remainder of the season with the Checkers on February 18, 2020. Broadhurst made just 6 more appearances before he was traded by the Checkers, along with Cedric Lacroix to the Bridgeport Sound Tigers in exchange for Ryan Bourque on March 2, 2020.

Broadhurst remained a free agent into the pandemic delayed 2020-21 season, only to belatedly sign with the Indy Fuel of the ECHL on April 8, 2021. He made 21 regular season appearances, providing a scoring presence with 6 goals and 19 points.

After a lone season with the Tucson Roadrunners in the 2021–22 season, Broadhurst returned to Europe and signed a one-year deal with German club, Augsburger Panther of the DEL, on September 9, 2022. In the 2022–23 season with Augsburg, Broadhurst contributed with 10 goals and 28 points through 54 regular season games, however was unable to help prevent the Panthers finish in a relegation position. He left the club at the conclusion of his contract on March 17, 2023.

== Career statistics ==
			Regular season					Playoffs
Season	Team	League	GP	G	A	Pts	PIM	GP	G	A	Pts	PIM
2007–08	Sioux Falls Stampede	USHL	56	7	16	23	12	3	2	1	3	0
2008–09	Sioux Falls Stampede	USHL	60	27	31	58	30	4	2	1	3	2
2009–10	U. of Nebraska-Omaha	CCHA	42	13	11	24	10	—	—	—	—	—
2010–11	U. of Nebraska-Omaha	WCHA	30	11	19	30	14	—	—	—	—	—
2011–12	U. of Nebraska-Omaha	WCHA	38	16	20	36	6	—	—	—	—	—
2011–12	Rockford IceHogs	AHL	8	0	2	0	2	—	—	—	—	—
2012–13	Toledo Walleye	ECHL	36	12	19	31	14	—	—	—	—	—
2012–13	Rockford IceHogs	AHL	31	5	8	13	12	—	—	—	—	—
2013–14	Rockford IceHogs	AHL	73	16	28	44	16	—	—	—	—	—
2014–15	Chicago Wolves	AHL	58	8	18	26	14	3	0	0	0	0
2015–16	Skellefteå AIK	SHL	38	6	7	13	6	—	—	—	—	—
2015–16	Brynäs IF	SHL	10	0	1	1	4	3	0	3	3	0
2016–17	KooKoo	Liiga	53	14	22	36	10	—	—	—	—	—
2017–18	Cleveland Monsters	AHL	49	13	19	32	8	—	—	—	—	—
2018–19	Rockford IceHogs	AHL	40	4	8	12	12	—	—	—	—	—
2019–20	Charlotte Checkers	AHL	29	0	7	7	8	—	—	—	—	—
2019–20	Bridgeport Sound Tigers	AHL	4	1	1	2	4	—	—	—	—	—
2020–21	Indy Fuel	ECHL	21	6	13	19	4	4	1	1	2	6
2021–22	Tucson Roadrunners	AHL	49	11	13	24	4	—	—	—	—	—
2022–23	Augsburger Panther	DEL	54	10	18	28	10	—	—	—	—	—
2023–24	HC TPS	Liiga	16	2	0	2	4	9	1	1	2	0
2024–25	HK Poprad	Slovak	35	8	9	17	10	1	0	0	0	0
AHL totals			341	58	104	162	78	3	0	0	0	0

== Awards and honors ==
Award	Year
College
All-CCHA Rookie Team	2010
All-WCHA Academic Team	2011, 2012
