= Ryan Walters (ice hockey) =

American ice hockey player (born 1991)

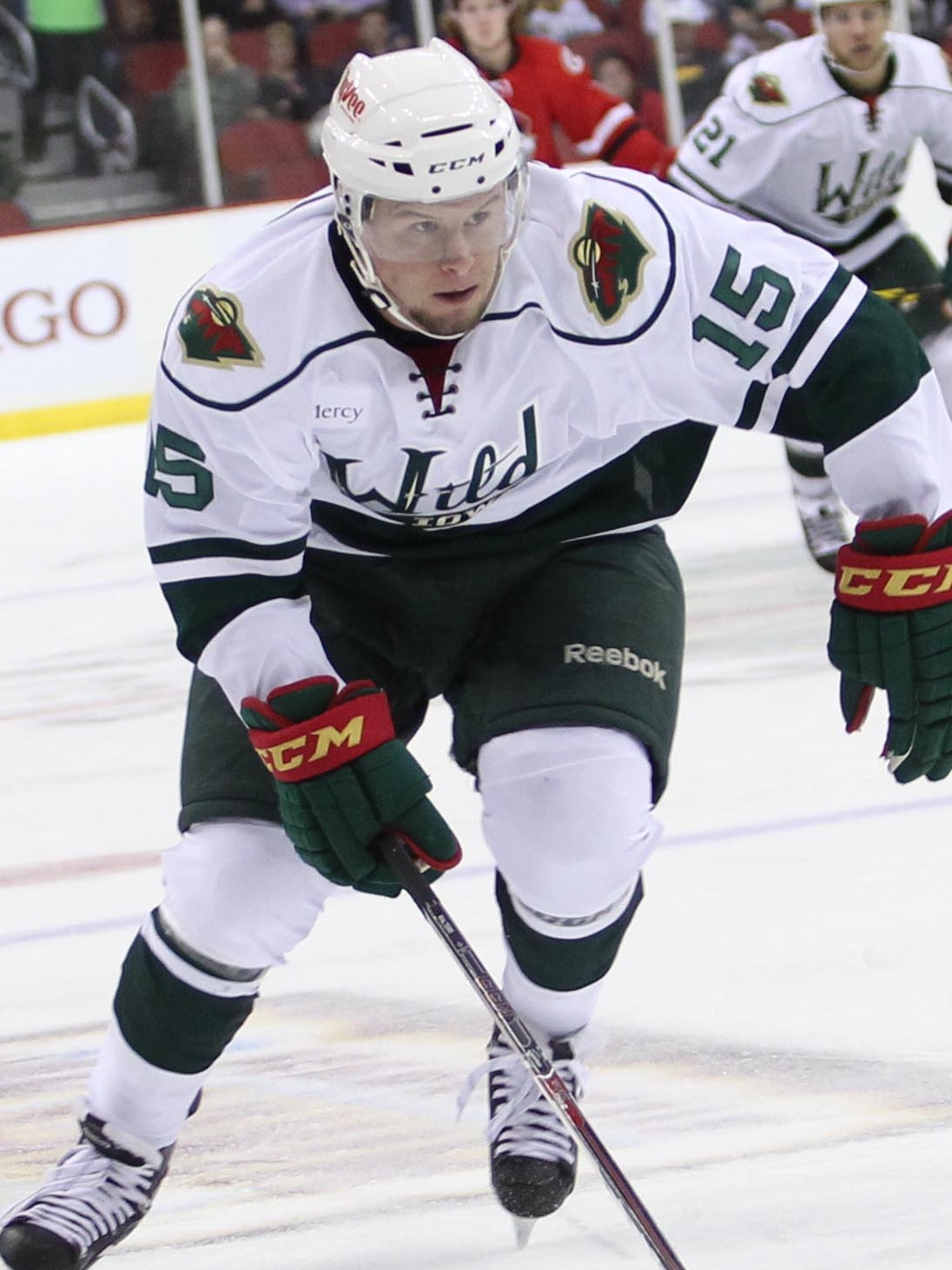
- Walters playing with the Iowa Wild in 2014
- Born: July 30, 1991 (age 34) Rosemount, Minnesota, U.S.
- Height: 6 ft 0 in (183 cm)
- Weight: 188 lb (85 kg; 13 st 6 lb)
- Position: Forward
- Shot: Left
- Played for: Bridgeport Sound Tigers; Iowa Wild; San Diego Gulls; Yunost Minsk
- NHL draft: Undrafted
- Playing career: 2010–2019

Ryan Walters (born July 30, 1991) is a retired American professional ice hockey forward. He most recently played for the Utah Grizzlies in the ECHL.

== Playing career ==
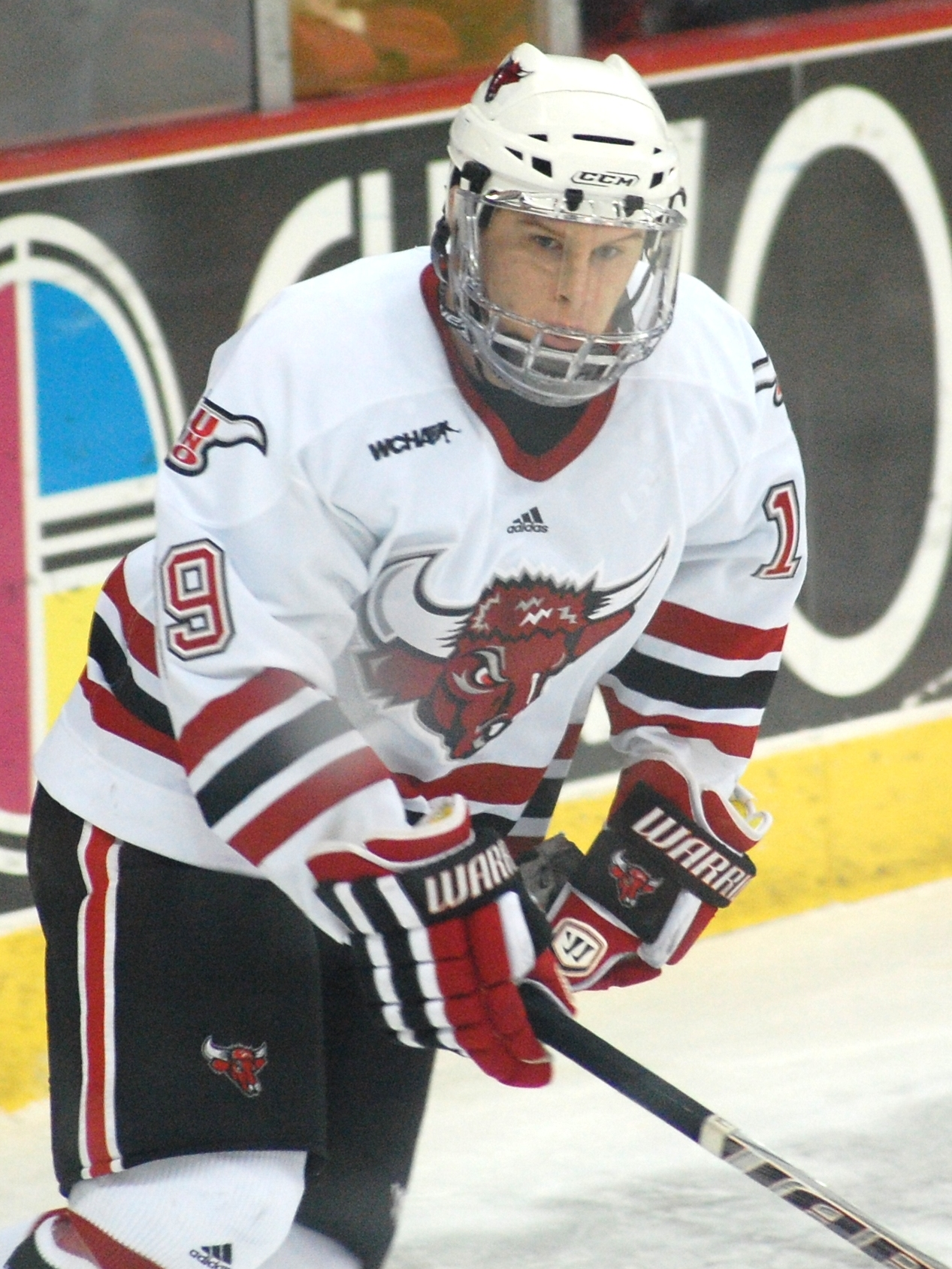
Walters in 2010, playing college hockey for the Omaha Mavericks

Walters played college hockey with the Nebraska–Omaha Mavericks in the NCAA Men's Division I WCHA conference. In his junior year, Walters was named to the 2012–13 All-WCHA First Team.

Upon completing his collegiate career, Walters signed an amateur try-out contract with the Bridgeport Sound Tigers of the American Hockey League on March 21, 2014.

Walters was invited to represent the Minnesota Wild at the 2014 NHL prospects tournament. He signed a one-year contract with Minnesota's AHL affiliate, the Iowa Wild, on September 24, 2014.

On August 25, 2015, Walters signed a one-year contract as a free agent with the Utah Grizzlies of the ECHL.

After three full minor league seasons in North America, Walters opted to pursue a European career in agreeing to a one-year deal with Belarusian club, Yunost Minsk of the Extraliga on May 31, 2017. Walters played 10 games with Yunost before opting to return to the ECHL, with former club, the Utah Grizzlies on October 30, 2017.

== Career statistics ==
			Regular season					Playoffs
Season	Team	League	GP	G	A	Pts	PIM	GP	G	A	Pts	PIM
2006–07	St. Thomas Academy	USHS	26	23	25	48	12	—	—	—	—	—
2007–08	St. Thomas Academy	USHS	29	36	39	75	26	—	—	—	—	—
2007–08	Des Moines Buccaneers	USHL	16	0	3	3	14	—	—	—	—	—
2008–09	Des Moines Buccaneers	USHL	60	18	26	44	84	—	—	—	—	—
2009–10	Des Moines Buccaneers	USHL	59	21	40	61	103	—	—	—	—	—
2010–11	U. of Nebraska-Omaha	WCHA	38	11	12	23	42	—	—	—	—	—
2011–12	U. of Nebraska-Omaha	WCHA	38	10	15	25	56	—	—	—	—	—
2012–13	U. of Nebraska-Omaha	WCHA	39	22	30	52	20	—	—	—	—	—
2013–14	U. of Nebraska-Omaha	NCHC	37	7	27	34	18	—	—	—	—	—
2013–14	Bridgeport Sound Tigers	AHL	11	1	2	3	2	—	—	—	—	—
2014–15	Iowa Wild	AHL	20	1	7	8	6	—	—	—	—	—
2014–15	Alaska Aces	ECHL	46	20	23	43	13	—	—	—	—	—
2015–16	Utah Grizzlies	ECHL	53	19	22	41	39	—	—	—	—	—
2015–16	San Diego Gulls	AHL	1	0	0	0	0	—	—	—	—	—
2015–16	Rapid City Rush	ECHL	17	5	12	17	11	—	—	—	—	—
2016–17	Rapid City Rush	ECHL	72	30	39	69	53	—	—	—	—	—
2017–18	Yunost Minsk	BXL	10	7	8	15	0	—	—	—	—	—
2017–18	Utah Grizzlies	ECHL	63	29	34	63	30	—	—	—	—	—
2018–19	Utah Grizzlies	ECHL	64	17	31	48	58	—	—	—	—	—
AHL totals			32	2	9	11	8	—	—	—	—	—

== Awards and honors ==
Award	Year
College
All-WCHA First Team	2012–13
AHCA West Second-Team All-American	2012–13

Awards and achievements
Preceded by Jack Connolly	WCHA Scoring leader 2012–13	Succeeded by Cody Kunyk
