= Scott Parse =

American ice hockey player

- Born: September 5, 1984 (age 41) Portage, Michigan, U.S.
- Height: 5 ft 11 in (180 cm)
- Weight: 189 lb (86 kg; 13 st 7 lb)
- Position: Centre
- Shot: Right
- Played for: Los Angeles Kings
- NHL draft: 174th overall, 2004; Los Angeles Kings
- Playing career: 2007–2013

Scott Parse (born September 5, 1984) is an American former professional ice hockey winger who played in the National Hockey League with the Los Angeles Kings. He was drafted 174th overall by the Kings in the 2004 NHL entry draft.

== Playing career ==
Parse signed a one-year contract with the Los Angeles Kings on July 9, 2009. He played his first NHL game on October 24, 2009, against the Phoenix Coyotes. In the 3rd period of his debut game, Parse recorded his first NHL point with an assist to forward Jarret Stoll who scored on Coyotes goalie Ilya Bryzgalov. His first NHL goal was scored on October 29, 2009, in the 1st period against Andrew Raycroft of the Vancouver Canucks.

On March 29, 2010, Parse scored both goals in a 2–3 loss by the Kings at the hands of the Minnesota Wild. It was Parse's first 2-goal game in the NHL. He scored the following night against the Nashville Predators, a goal which proved to be the game winner, making it 3 goals in 2 games for the Kings.

On May 26, 2010, Parse re-signed with the Kings for 2 years with a cap hit of $900,000 per season. He started the 2010–11 NHL season on the Kings' injured reserve list, missing the first 11 games of the season before returning to game action on November 4, 2010, in a home game against the Tampa Bay Lightning. After only playing 5 games, he was placed on IR and underwent hip surgery to repair his labrum. He was activated from injured reserve on April 23, 2011, after missing 77 regular season games.

Parse made the final roster for the 2011-12 season but was placed on injured reserve on November 9, 2011, due to a lower body injury.

== Career statistics ==
			Regular season					Playoffs
Season	Team	League	GP	G	A	Pts	PIM	GP	G	A	Pts	PIM
2000–01	Soo Indians AAA	18U AAA	42	12	20	32	58	—	—	—	—	—
2001–02	Soo Indians AAA	18U AAA	62	46	45	91	128	—	—	—	—	—
2002–03	Tri–City Storm	USHL	48	21	23	44	32	3	2	1	3	8
2003–04	University of Nebraska Omaha	CCHA	39	16	19	35	52	—	—	—	—	—
2004–05	University of Nebraska Omaha	CCHA	39	19	30	49	32	—	—	—	—	—
2005–06	University of Nebraska Omaha	CCHA	41	20	41	61	40	—	—	—	—	—
2006–07	University of Nebraska Omaha	CCHA	40	24	28	52	36	—	—	—	—	—
2006–07	Grand Rapids Griffins	AHL	10	2	5	7	6	7	1	0	1	8
2007–08	Manchester Monarchs	AHL	14	0	3	3	4	—	—	—	—	—
2007–08	Reading Royals	ECHL	14	0	3	3	4	—	—	—	—	—
2008–09	Manchester Monarchs	AHL	74	15	24	39	38	—	—	—	—	—
2009–10	Manchester Monarchs	AHL	14	4	11	15	21	—	—	—	—	—
2009–10	Los Angeles Kings	NHL	59	11	13	24	22	4	0	0	0	0
2010–11	Los Angeles Kings	NHL	5	1	3	4	0	2	0	0	0	0
2011–12	Los Angeles Kings	NHL	9	2	0	2	14	—	—	—	—	—
2012–13	Albany Devils	AHL	15	1	3	4	8	—	—	—	—	—
AHL totals			127	22	46	68	77	7	1	0	1	8
NHL totals			73	14	16	30	36	6	0	0	0	0

== Awards and achievements ==
Award	Year
All-CCHA First Team	2004-05
All-CCHA First Team	2005-06
AHCA West First-Team All-American	2005–06
All-CCHA First Team	2006-07
AHCA West Second-Team All-American	2006–07

Awards and achievements
Preceded by Tuomas Tarkki	CCHA Player of the Year; 2005-06	Succeeded by David Brown
