= Dan Ellis (ice hockey) =

Canadian ice hockey player (born 1980)

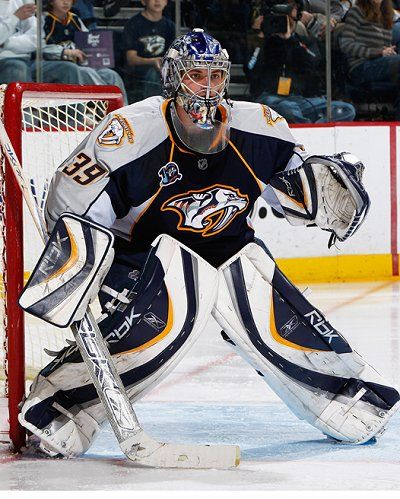
- Ellis with Nashville Predators in 2008
- Born: June 19, 1980 (age 46) Saskatoon, Saskatchewan, Canada
- Height: 6 ft 1 in (185 cm)
- Weight: 191 lb (87 kg; 13 st 9 lb)
- Position: Goaltender
- Caught: Left
- Played for: Dallas Stars; Nashville Predators; Tampa Bay Lightning; Anaheim Ducks; Carolina Hurricanes; Florida Panthers
- NHL draft: 60th overall, 2000; Dallas Stars
- Playing career: 2003–2016

Daniel Ellis (born June 19, 1980) is a Canadian former professional ice hockey goaltender who currently works as a goaltending scout for the Chicago Blackhawks of the National Hockey League (NHL).

He was selected in the second round, 60th overall, by the Dallas Stars in the 2000 NHL entry draft. Ellis also played for the Nashville Predators, Tampa Bay Lightning, Anaheim Ducks, Carolina Hurricanes, and Florida Panthers.

== Playing career ==
=== Amateur ===
Ellis was born in Saskatoon, Saskatchewan but grew up in Orangeville, Ontario and played his minor hockey for the AA Orangeville Flyers of the OMHA Tri-County Hockey League and then eventually AAA hockey for the Halton Hills Hurricanes of the OMHA South-Central Triple A Hockey League.

Ellis was drafted by the Owen Sound Platers of the Ontario Hockey League and played Major Midget hockey for Halton in 1996–97, and the following season for the Newmarket Hurricanes club of the Ontario Provincial Junior A Hockey League (OPJHL). Ellis maintained his amateur status in order to remain eligible for a US hockey scholarship.

After one season in Newmarket, Ellis moved south to the Omaha Lancers, in the USHL where he was awarded Goaltender of the Year, Player of the Year and named a First Team All-Star.

Following his USHL season, Ellis then spent three years at the University of Nebraska at Omaha before signing after the 2002–03 season.

=== Dallas Stars ===
The Dallas Stars drafted Ellis in the 2nd round, 60th overall, of the 2000 NHL entry draft. For the 2003–2004 season, Ellis split time between the Utah Grizzlies and Idaho Steelheads of the ECHL, finishing the season with the Steelheads. In Idaho, Ellis had great success, leading the team to a Kelly Cup Championship win and nabbing the 2004 Playoff MVP award with a record of 13–0 and a 1.86 goals-against average.

For the 2005–06 AHL season, Ellis spent his time exclusively with the Iowa Stars. He split playing time with fellow goalie Mike Smith, but ultimately lost the job as the season came to a close. He finished the season with a record of 16 wins, 13 losses and 1 tie.

Ellis made his NHL debut on February 8, 2004 against the Los Angeles Kings. Ellis made 25 saves en route to his first career win as Dallas defeated Los Angeles 4 – 3.

=== Nashville Predators ===
In 2007, Ellis signed as a free agent with the Nashville Predators. Due to sub-standard play from starting goalie Chris Mason, Ellis took over the starting goaltender duties for the Predators for the 2007–08 NHL season. On October 25, 2007, in only his second career start, his first with the Predators—who signed him as a free agent on July 5, 2007—he won 3–0 against the Atlanta Thrashers, making 20 saves en route to his first NHL shutout. On November 1, 2007, he posted another shutout against the Vancouver Canucks for his fourth win of the season. He played very well down the stretch, posting two shutouts in the final few games and leading the Predators to the playoffs. As a result, he was named as the NHL's Second Star of the Week for the week ending March 30, 2008.

Ellis posted impressive statistics during the 2007–2008 season, being among the top goaltenders in save percentage (1st), shutouts (T-3rd), and GAA (12th). He also received national coverage for his excessive weight loss during games, receiving intravenous fluids after games, and for his shutout streak of 233:39 over the course of four games.

He earned the nickname "Snowstorm" in the spring of 2008 when the poor play of Ellis and teammate Chris Mason caused the team to call up minor-league goalie Pekka Rinne. However, Rinne was delayed from joining the team due to a snowstorm, and Ellis was given the start in the subsequent game against the Chicago Blackhawks on March 22, 2008. He held the Blackhawks to one goal on 38 shots and led the Predators to a 2–1 shootout victory. This victory earned him the starting job for the team, lasting into the 2008 playoffs.

He was the starting goalie for Nashville in their 2008 first-round series against the number one-seeded Detroit Red Wings. Ellis stopped 71 of 78 shots he faced in the first two games, both losses. Back home at Nashville for games three and four, he proceeded to stop 62 of 67 shots as the Predators won both games at home to tie the series at 2. Game 5 was Ellis' best game of the series as he made 52 saves in a 2–1 overtime loss. The Red Wings closed out the series in Game 6 at Nashville with a 3–0 win. Ellis was victimized by Red Wings defenceman Nicklas Lidström's skipping shot from behind center ice for the game's first goal, which turned out to be the winner.

On June 19, 2008, Ellis was re-signed to a two-year, $3.5 million contract by the Predators. During the 2008–09 season, Ellis wasn't as sharp as the previous season, recording only 11 wins compared to his 23 wins of the previous season. Because of this, Rinne, who was Nashville's backup goaltender at the start of the season, took over the starting job. Ellis recorded 15 wins in 31 appearances during the 2009–10 NHL season with a 2.69 goals-against-average.

On June 29, 2010, Ellis' negotiation rights were traded to the Montreal Canadiens with Dustin Boyd, for Sergei Kostitsyn and future considerations. Without a deal in place before July 1, 2010, Ellis became an unrestricted free agent.

=== Tampa Bay Lightning ===
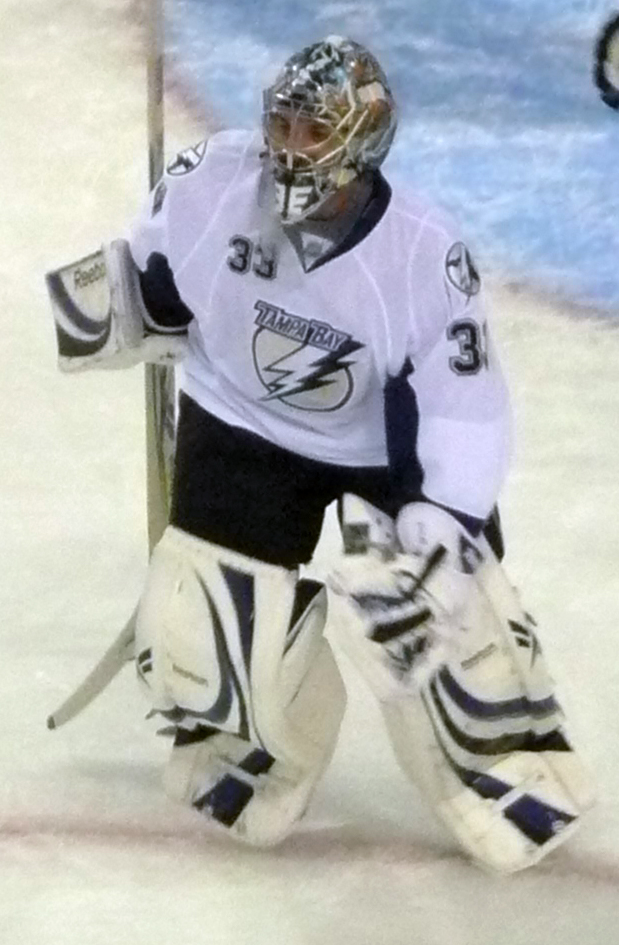
Ellis during his tenure with the Lightning.

Ellis signed a two-year, $3 million deal with the Tampa Bay Lightning as a free agent on July 1, 2010.

=== Later years ===
On February 24, 2011 Ellis was traded to the Anaheim Ducks in a goalie swap for Curtis McElhinney. After posting a solid 8–3 record upon his arrival in Anaheim, he made a postseason start in round one of the 2011 Playoffs, but lost the starting job to Ray Emery after allowing four goals on 24 shots.

After the conclusion of the 2012–13 NHL lockout and playing on an AHL contract with the Charlotte Checkers of the AHL, Ellis signed with NHL affiliate, the Carolina Hurricanes on January 8, 2013 as a backup to starter Cam Ward. Ellis got into his first game with the Hurricanes during the first game of the season, January 19 against the Florida Panthers after Ward let in four goals in the first period.

On July 5, 2013 after a one-year stint in Carolina, Ellis re-joined his original draft team the Dallas Stars, on a two-year deal to be the back-up goalie to Kari Lehtonen, with an Average Annual Value of $900,000.

On March 5, 2014, Ellis was traded to the Florida Panthers in return for goalie Tim Thomas. He appeared in six games for the Panthers that season. In September 2014, the Panthers assigned him to their AHL affiliate, the San Antonio Rampage.

On July 4, 2015, having left the Panthers as a free agent, Ellis signed a one-year, two-way contract with the Washington Capitals and spent most of the season playing with the Hershey Bears, their AHL affiliate

== Personal life ==
Ellis was born in Saskatoon, Saskatchewan, but was raised in Orangeville, Ontario. He moved to Nebraska when his college career began and resides during the offseason in Omaha. Ellis is a devout Christian and displays a cross at the back of his mask. He is divorced and has two children. He is currently in a relationship with Nora Toma, a physician from metro-Detroit.

== Records ==
- Nashville Predators franchise record for longest shutout streak (233:39)
- Nashville Predators franchise record for saves and shots faced in a single game (52)
- University of Nebraska-Omaha (CCHA) franchise record for games played (118)
- University of Nebraska-Omaha (CCHA) franchise record for games started (117)
- University of Nebraska-Omaha (CCHA) franchise record for wins (53)
- University of Nebraska-Omaha (CCHA) franchise record for shutouts (7)
- University of Nebraska-Omaha (CCHA) franchise record for saves (3,125)

== Career statistics ==
=== Regular season and playoffs ===
			Regular season										Playoffs
Season	Team	League	GP	W	L	T	OTL	MIN	GA	SO	GAA	SV%	GP	W	L	MIN	GA	SO	GAA	SV%
1999–00	Omaha Lancers	USHL	55	34	16	4	—	3274	123	11	2.25	.925	4	1	3	238	10	0	2.52	—
2000–01	University of Nebraska-Omaha	CCHA	40	21	14	3	—	2285	95	0	2.49	.911	—	—	—	—	—	—	—	—
2001–02	University of Nebraska-Omaha	CCHA	40	20	15	4	—	2405	97	0	2.42	.919	—	—	—	—	—	—	—	—
2002–03	University of Nebraska-Omaha	CCHA	39	11	21	5	—	2211	117	0	3.18	.900	—	—	—	—	—	—	—	—
2003–04	Utah Grizzlies	AHL	20	5	14	0	—	1130	55	2	2.92	.909	—	—	—	—	—	—	—	—
2003–04	Idaho Steelheads	ECHL	23	13	8	1	—	1334	57	2	2.56	.909	16	13	3	966	30	3	1.86	.938
2003–04	Dallas Stars	NHL	1	1	0	0	—	60	3	0	3.00	.893	—	—	—	—	—	—	—	—
2004–05	Hamilton Bulldogs	AHL	31	10	19	0	—	1773	82	1	2.77	.908	—	—	—	—	—	—	—	—
2005–06	Iowa Stars	AHL	34	16	13	—	1	1857	86	2	2.78	.911	—	—	—	—	—	—	—	—
2006–07	Iowa Stars	AHL	55	30	21	—	1	3194	148	4	2.78	.894	—	—	—	—	—	—	—	—
2007–08	Nashville Predators	NHL	44	23	10	—	3	2228	87	6	2.34	.924	6	2	4	357	15	0	2.52	.938
2008–09	Nashville Predators	NHL	35	11	19	—	4	1965	96	3	2.93	.900	—	—	—	—	—	—	—	—
2009–10	Nashville Predators	NHL	31	15	13	—	1	1715	77	1	2.69	.909	—	—	—	—	—	—	—	—
2010–11	Tampa Bay Lightning	NHL	31	13	7	—	6	1679	82	2	2.93	.899	—	—	—	—	—	—	—	—
2010–11	Anaheim Ducks	NHL	13	8	3	—	1	729	29	0	2.39	.917	1	0	1	41	4	0	5.85	.833
2011–12	Anaheim Ducks	NHL	10	1	5	—	0	419	19	0	2.72	.911	—	—	—	—	—	—	—	—
2012–13	Charlotte Checkers	AHL	18	8	7	—	2	1026	42	2	2.46	.922	—	—	—	—	—	—	—	—
2012–13	Carolina Hurricanes	NHL	19	6	8	—	2	997	52	1	3.13	.906	—	—	—	—	—	—	—	—
2013–14	Dallas Stars	NHL	14	5	6	—	1	690	35	1	3.04	.900	—	—	—	—	—	—	—	—
2013–14	Florida Panthers	NHL	6	0	5	—	0	337	27	0	4.81	.836	—	—	—	—	—	—	—	—
2014–15	San Antonio Rampage	AHL	37	22	12	—	3	2191	99	2	2.71	.904	2	0	2	123	5	0	2.44	.932
2014–15	Florida Panthers	NHL	8	4	3	—	1	486	19	1	2.35	.914	—	—	—	—	—	—	—	—
2015–16	Hershey Bears	AHL	43	25	12	—	5	2440	97	4	2.38	.908	2	0	1	100	8	0	4.80	.843
NHL totals			212	87	79	0	18	11,306	526	15	2.79	.906	7	2	5	398	19	0	2.86	.928

== Awards and honors ==
Award	Year
USHL Goaltender of the Year	1999–00
USHL First All-Star Team	1999–00
USHL Player of the Year	1999–00
All-CCHA Rookie Team	2000–01
All-CCHA Second Team	2001–02
