= Eddie DelGrosso =

American ice hockey player (born 1985)

- Born: August 27, 1985 (age 40) Las Vegas, Nevada, U.S.
- Height: 5 ft 11 in (180 cm)
- Weight: 200 lb (91 kg; 14 st 4 lb)
- Position: Defense
- Shot: Left
- Played for: AHL; Springfield Falcons; SM-liiga; HIFK; HPK; ECHL; Las Vegas Wranglers
- NHL draft: Undrafted
- Playing career: 2010–2014

Eddie DelGrosso (born August 27, 1985) is an American professional ice hockey player. He last played for the Las Vegas Wranglers of the ECHL. DelGrosso played collegiate hockey for the University of Nebraska-Omaha, where he became the school's all-time leading scorer for defencemen.

== Collegiate ==
DelGrosso played four seasons with the University of Nebraska-Omaha. In his rookie season, he was named to the All-CCHA Rookie Team. In his junior year, he was named to the All-CCHA Second Team. In his senior year, DelGrosso became the school's all-time leading scorer for defenceman, surpassing Greg Zanon, and was named to the All-CCHA First Team. He signed a professional contract with the Springfield Falcons of the American Hockey League (AHL) on March 24, 2010.

== Professional ==
DelGrosso appeared in eight games with the Falcons to finish the 2009–10 season. The following year, he signed with HIFK in Finland’s top professional league, the Liiga, where he played five games during the 2010–11 season. He was then loaned out for additional playing time, spending 13 games with Kiekko-Vantaa in Mestis and two games with HPK. His contract was terminated in December 2010, after which he returned to North America and signed with the Las Vegas Wranglers in the ECHL.

On October 20, 2011, DelGrosso was waived by the Las Vegas Wranglers and subsequently claimed by the Ontario Reign. Despite this, he chose to sign with HYS The Hague in the top-tier BeNe League instead. During the 2012–13 season, he played a key role in helping the team capture the Dutch Cup title.

== Awards and honors ==
Award	Year
All-CCHA Rookie Team	2006-07
All-CCHA Second Team	2008-09
All-CCHA First Team	2009-10
