= Bill Thomas (ice hockey) =

American professional ice hockey player (born 1983)

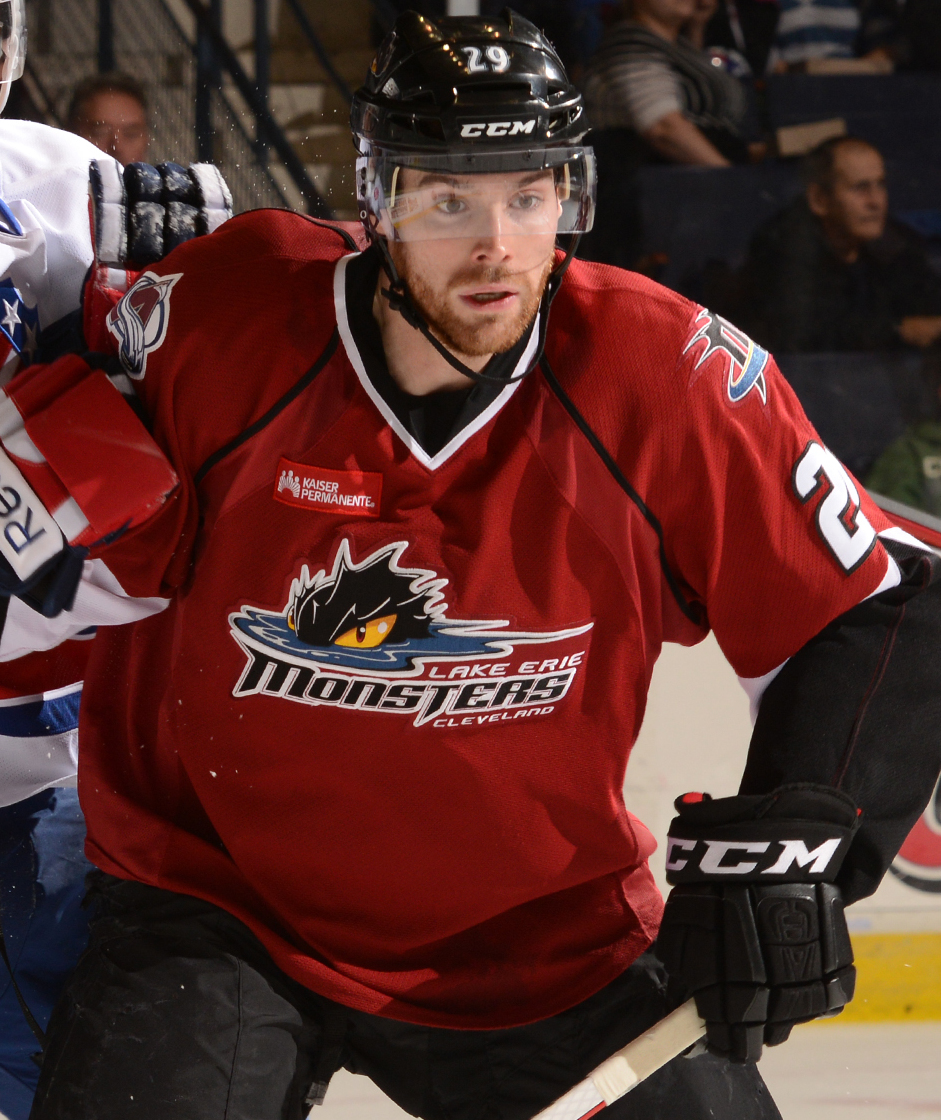
- Thomas with the Lake Erie Monsters in 2012
- Born: June 20, 1983 (age 43) Pittsburgh, Pennsylvania, U.S.
- Height: 6 ft 1 in (185 cm)
- Weight: 190 lb (86 kg; 13 st 8 lb)
- Position: Right wing
- Shoots: Right
- AL team Former teams: Anyang Halla; Phoenix Coyotes; Pittsburgh Penguins; HC Lugano; Florida Panthers; KHL Medveščak Zagreb; Modo Hockey; EC Red Bull Salzburg; Tampereen Ilves; Kölner Haie
- NHL draft: Undrafted
- Playing career: 2006–present

William Thomas (born June 20, 1983) is an American professional ice hockey player. He currently plays right wing for Anyang Halla, member of the Asia League Ice Hockey (AL).

== Playing career ==
He was undrafted out of suburban Pittsburgh Fox Chapel Area High School. Thomas played for the Cleveland Jr. Barons of the NAHL and Tri-City Storm of the USHL. He also played for the University of Nebraska at Omaha Mavericks for two years, leading them to their first NCAA Division I hockey tournament appearance.

After playing in the 2006 NCAA Men's Division I Ice Hockey Tournament, Thomas signed his first professional contract on March 26, 2006, with the Phoenix Coyotes a few days after the Mavericks were eliminated from the tournament in the first round. Thomas played 47 games for the Phoenix Coyotes' AHL affiliate, the San Antonio Rampage, in the 2006–07 season. He led the Rampage in goals in the 2007–08 season until he was also called up to the NHL for 24 games with the Coyotes during the same year. After the season Thomas signed a one-year contract with the Penguins on July 15, 2008. William scored his first goal with the Penguins, his hometown team, against the San Jose Sharks on February 11, 2009.

On September 13, 2009, Thomas accepted an invite to the Toronto Maple Leafs' pre-season training camp on a tryout basis only to be subsequently released from the Maple Leafs on September 19, 2009. During the 2009–10 season, on November 3, 2009, Thomas then signed a Professional Try-out Agreement with the Springfield Falcons. After scoring 17 points in 33 games with the Falcons, he was released from his P.T.O on January 22, 2010, to join HC Lugano of the Swiss National League A for the remainder of the season.

William returned to North America following the conclusion of the season with Lugano to sign a one-year contract with the Florida Panthers on July 2, 2010. Assigned to the Panthers' AHL affiliate, the Rochester Americans, Thomas led the team in goals to start the 2010–11 season, before he was recalled to make his Panthers debut and first NHL return in two seasons, against the New York Islanders on November 20, 2010. Thomas tied a career high to appear in 24 games with the Panthers, scoring 7 points.

In the following 2011–12 season, Thomas attended the Panthers training camp without a contract. Reassigned to the Panthers' new AHL affiliate and his previous AHL team, the San Antonio Rampage, Thomas later earned a one-year deal for the remainder of the season with Florida on December 20, 2011. With only 7 games with the Panthers, Thomas matched his last season with the Rampage in 2008 to tie a career-high with 52 points.

On July 3, 2012, Thomas signed as a free agent to a one-year contract with the Colorado Avalanche. With the NHL lockout coming to affect, Thomas was assigned directly by the Avalanche to AHL affiliate, the Lake Erie Monsters. During the duration of the 2012–13 season, Thomas provided a veteran presence for the Monsters and featured in every game to lead the team with 22 goals.

On June 14, 2013, Thomas signed his second contract abroad with a one-year contract with KHL Medveščak Zagreb from Croatia, the newest member of Kontinental Hockey League.

After two seasons in the KHL in Zagreb, Thomas left as a free agent to sign a one-year contract in the Swedish Hockey League with Modo Hockey on June 22, 2015. In the 2015–16 season, Thomas added 12 goals and 22 points in 48 games, however was unable to help keep Modo in the SHL, losing in relegation to the HockeyAllsvenskan.

On June 24, 2016, having left Modo as a free agent, Thomas agreed to a one-year contract with Austrian club, EC Red Bull Salzburg of the EBEL.

On November 30, 2017, Thomas signed a one-month try-out contract with the Finnish club Ilves Tampere of the Liiga. After spending a month with Ilves, on January 2, 2018 he was introduced as a new forward for German club Kölner Haie of the Deutsche Eishockey Liga (DEL).

== Career statistics ==
			Regular season					Playoffs
Season	Team	League	GP	G	A	Pts	PIM	GP	G	A	Pts	PIM
2000–01	Cleveland Jr. Barons	NAHL	51	3	3	6	2	—	—	—	—	—
2001–02	Cleveland Jr. Barons	NAHL	52	12	17	29	16	—	—	—	—	—
2002–03	Tri-City Storm	USHL	60	29	21	50	20	3	0	3	3	4
2003–04	Tri-City Storm	USHL	60	31	38	69	30	9	8	6	14	4
2004–05	University of Nebraska-Omaha	CCHA	39	19	26	45	12	—	—	—	—	—
2005–06	University of Nebraska-Omaha	CCHA	41	27	23	50	43	—	—	—	—	—
2005–06	Phoenix Coyotes	NHL	9	1	2	3	8	—	—	—	—	—
2006–07	San Antonio Rampage	AHL	47	13	20	33	20	—	—	—	—	—
2006–07	Phoenix Coyotes	NHL	24	8	6	14	2	—	—	—	—	—
2007–08	San Antonio Rampage	AHL	75	24	28	52	40	7	1	2	3	0
2007–08	Phoenix Coyotes	NHL	7	0	0	0	0	—	—	—	—	—
2008–09	Pittsburgh Penguins	NHL	16	2	1	3	2	—	—	—	—	—
2008–09	Wilkes-Barre/Scranton Penguins	AHL	39	8	10	18	24	12	1	4	5	12
2009–10	Springfield Falcons	AHL	33	5	12	17	14	—	—	—	—	—
2009–10	HC Lugano	NLA	6	2	1	3	2	2	0	0	0	0
2010–11	Rochester Americans	AHL	53	16	20	36	12	—	—	—	—	—
2010–11	Florida Panthers	NHL	24	4	3	7	6	—	—	—	—	—
2011–12	San Antonio Rampage	AHL	65	27	25	52	18	10	5	5	10	0
2011–12	Florida Panthers	NHL	7	1	0	1	0	—	—	—	—	—
2012–13	Lake Erie Monsters	AHL	76	22	21	43	33	—	—	—	—	—
2013–14	KHL Medveščak Zagreb	KHL	54	11	19	30	14	4	1	1	2	2
2014–15	KHL Medveščak Zagreb	KHL	60	18	18	36	22	—	—	—	—	—
2015–16	Modo Hockey	SHL	48	12	10	22	18	—	—	—	—	—
2016–17	EC Red Bull Salzburg	EBEL	54	17	29	46	24	11	5	2	7	0
2017–18	Ilves	Liiga	6	2	1	3	0	—	—	—	—	—
2017–18	Kölner Haie	DEL	14	1	6	7	4	6	1	1	2	2
NHL totals			87	16	12	28	18	—	—	—	—	—

== Awards and honors ==
Award	Year
College
All-CCHA Rookie of the Year	2004–05
All-CCHA Rookie Team	2004–05
All-CCHA Second Team	2004–05
All-CCHA First Team	2005–06

Awards and achievements
Preceded by T. J. Hensick	CCHA Rookie of the Year; 2004–05	Succeeded by Jeff Lerg
