= 1999–2000 Colorado Avalanche season =

National Hockey League team season

1999–2000 Colorado Avalanche
- Northwest Division champions
- Division: 1st Northwest
- Conference: 3rd Western
- 1999–2000 record: 42–28–11–1
- Home record: 25–12–4–0
- Road record: 17–16–7–1
- Goals for: 233
- Goals against: 201

Team information
- General manager: Pierre Lacroix
- Coach: Bob Hartley
- Captain: Joe Sakic
- Arena: Pepsi Center
- Average attendance: 17,889
- Minor league affiliate: Hershey Bears

Team leaders
- Goals: Milan Hejduk (36)
- Assists: Joe Sakic (53)
- Points: Joe Sakic (81)
- Penalty minutes: Jeff Odgers (162)
- Plus/minus: Joe Sakic (+30)
- Wins: Patrick Roy (32)
- Goals against average: Patrick Roy (2.28)

The 1999–2000 Colorado Avalanche season was the Avalanche's fifth season. It was the first season in the new Pepsi Center arena.

== Regular season ==
- December 12, 1999: Colorado beat the Vancouver Canucks, and Patrick Roy, who earned that decision, won his 424th game, surpassing Tony Esposito on the all-time list.
- March 4, 2000: Colorado beat the Tampa Bay Lightning, and Patrick Roy earned the 435th victory of his career, surpassing Jacques Plante on the all-time list.

=== Season standings ===
Northwest Division
No.	CR		GP	W	L	T	OTL	GF	GA	Pts
1	3	**Colorado Avalanche**	82	42	28	11	1	233	201	96
2	7	**Edmonton Oilers**	82	32	26	16	8	226	212	88
3	10	Vancouver Canucks	82	30	29	15	8	227	237	83
4	12	Calgary Flames	82	31	36	10	5	211	256	77

Note: CR = Conference rank; GP = Games played; W = Wins; L = Losses; T = Ties; OTL = Overtime loss; GF = Goals for; GA = Goals against; PIM = Penalties in minutes; Pts = Points
Bolded teams qualified for the playoffs.

Western Conference
R		Div	GP	W	L	T	OTL	GF	GA	Pts
**1**	**p – St. Louis Blues**	**CEN**	**82**	**51**	**19**	**11**	**1**	**248**	**165**	**114**
**2**	**y – Dallas Stars**	**PAC**	**82**	**43**	**23**	**10**	**6**	**211**	**184**	**102**
**3**	**y – Colorado Avalanche**	**NW**	**82**	**42**	**28**	**11**	**1**	**233**	**201**	**96**
**4**	**Detroit Red Wings**	**CEN**	**82**	**48**	**22**	**10**	**2**	**278**	**210**	**108**
**5**	**Los Angeles Kings**	**PAC**	**82**	**39**	**27**	**12**	**4**	**245**	**228**	**94**
**6**	**Phoenix Coyotes**	**PAC**	**82**	**39**	**31**	**8**	**4**	**232**	**228**	**90**
**7**	**Edmonton Oilers**	**NW**	**82**	**32**	**26**	**16**	**8**	**226**	**212**	**88**
**8**	**San Jose Sharks**	**PAC**	**82**	**35**	**30**	**10**	**7**	**225**	**214**	**87**
8.5
9	Mighty Ducks of Anaheim	PAC	82	34	33	12	3	217	227	83
10	Vancouver Canucks	NW	82	30	29	15	8	227	237	83
11	Chicago Blackhawks	CEN	82	33	37	10	2	242	245	78
12	Calgary Flames	NW	82	31	36	10	5	211	256	77
13	Nashville Predators	CEN	82	28	40	7	7	199	240	70

Divisions: CEN – Central, PAC – Pacific, NW – Northwest

bold – Qualified for playoffs; p – Won Presidents' Trophy; y – Won division

== Schedule and results ==
=== Regular season ===
1999–2000 regular season
October: 5–5–2–1 (home: 2–1–0–0; road: 3–4–2–1)

Game	Date	Score	Opponent	Record	Recap
1	October 5, 1999	3–2	@ Nashville Predators (1999–2000)	1–0–0–0	W
2	October 6, 1999	1–2	@ Toronto Maple Leafs (1999–2000)	1–1–0–0	L
3	October 8, 1999	3–3 OT	@ Pittsburgh Penguins (1999–2000)	1–1–1–0	T
4	October 10, 1999	2–4	@ New York Islanders (1999–2000)	1–2–1–0	L
5	October 11, 1999	3–3 OT	@ Boston Bruins (1999–2000)	1–2–2–0	T
6	October 13, 1999	2–1	Boston Bruins (1999–2000)	2–2–2–0	W
7	October 16, 1999	3–1	Ottawa Senators (1999–2000)	3–2–2–0	W
8	October 20, 1999	2–1	@ Montreal Canadiens (1999–2000)	4–2–2–0	W
9	October 21, 1999	1–4	@ Ottawa Senators (1999–2000)	4–3–2–0	L
10	October 23, 1999	3–2 OT	@ Atlanta Thrashers (1999–2000)	5–3–2–0	W
11	October 27, 1999	3–5	@ Detroit Red Wings (1999–2000)	5–4–2–0	L
12	October 28, 1999	4–5 OT	@ Philadelphia Flyers (1999–2000)	5–4–2–1	OTL
13	October 30, 1999	3–5	Phoenix Coyotes (1999–2000)	5–5–2–1	L

November: 6–5–1–0 (home: 3–3–0–0; road: 3–2–1–0)

Game	Date	Score	Opponent	Record	Recap
14	November 3, 1999	5–0	St. Louis Blues (1999–2000)	6–5–2–1	W
15	November 5, 1999	4–1	New York Rangers (1999–2000)	7–5–2–1	W
16	November 11, 1999	2–5	@ Los Angeles Kings (1999–2000)	7–6–2–1	L
17	November 13, 1999	5–2	@ Calgary Flames (1999–2000)	8–6–2–1	W
18	November 15, 1999	2–2 OT	@ Vancouver Canucks (1999–2000)	8–6–3–1	T
19	November 17, 1999	1–2	Florida Panthers (1999–2000)	8–7–3–1	L
20	November 19, 1999	2–3	New York Islanders (1999–2000)	8–8–3–1	L
21	November 22, 1999	3–2 OT	@ Dallas Stars (1999–2000)	9–8–3–1	W
22	November 23, 1999	2–6	Los Angeles Kings (1999–2000)	9–9–3–1	L
23	November 26, 1999	0–7	@ Phoenix Coyotes (1999–2000)	9–10–3–1	L
24	November 27, 1999	7–1	Calgary Flames (1999–2000)	10–10–3–1	W
25	November 30, 1999	4–2	@ Vancouver Canucks (1999–2000)	11–10–3–1	W

December: 7–5–1–0 (home: 4–1–0–0; road: 3–4–1–0)

Game	Date	Score	Opponent	Record	Recap
26	December 1, 1999	1–3	@ Edmonton Oilers (1999–2000)	11–11–3–1	L
27	December 4, 1999	3–1	Carolina Hurricanes (1999–2000)	12–11–3–1	W
28	December 6, 1999	5–2	Vancouver Canucks (1999–2000)	13–11–3–1	W
29	December 8, 1999	2–4	@ San Jose Sharks (1999–2000)	13–12–3–1	L
30	December 10, 1999	2–1	@ Mighty Ducks of Anaheim (1999–2000)	14–12–3–1	W
31	December 12, 1999	3–2 OT	@ Vancouver Canucks (1999–2000)	15–12–3–1	W
32	December 15, 1999	2–4	Mighty Ducks of Anaheim (1999–2000)	15–13–3–1	L
33	December 17, 1999	2–5	@ Detroit Red Wings (1999–2000)	15–14–3–1	L
34	December 18, 1999	2–2 OT	@ Nashville Predators (1999–2000)	15–14–4–1	T
35	December 20, 1999	4–2	@ Carolina Hurricanes (1999–2000)	16–14–4–1	W
36	December 23, 1999	1–2	@ Buffalo Sabres (1999–2000)	16–15–4–1	L
37	December 27, 1999	5–1	St. Louis Blues (1999–2000)	17–15–4–1	W
38	December 29, 1999	4–2	Los Angeles Kings (1999–2000)	18–15–4–1	W

January: 7–4–3–0 (home: 6–0–2–0; road: 1–4–1–0)

Game	Date	Score	Opponent	Record	Recap
39	January 3, 2000	2–2 OT	Edmonton Oilers (1999–2000)	18–15–5–1	T
40	January 5, 2000	4–0	Calgary Flames (1999–2000)	19–15–5–1	W
41	January 7, 2000	4–1	Montreal Canadiens (1999–2000)	20–15–5–1	W
42	January 9, 2000	3–5	@ Chicago Blackhawks (1999–2000)	20–16–5–1	L
43	January 11, 2000	4–2	Nashville Predators (1999–2000)	21–16–5–1	W
44	January 13, 2000	4–3	Pittsburgh Penguins (1999–2000)	22–16–5–1	W
45	January 15, 2000	3–1	Chicago Blackhawks (1999–2000)	23–16–5–1	W
46	January 17, 2000	2–0	Phoenix Coyotes (1999–2000)	24–16–5–1	W
47	January 19, 2000	0–0 OT	San Jose Sharks (1999–2000)	24–16–6–1	T
48	January 21, 2000	3–3 OT	@ Mighty Ducks of Anaheim (1999–2000)	24–16–7–1	T
49	January 23, 2000	2–3	@ Los Angeles Kings (1999–2000)	24–17–7–1	L
50	January 25, 2000	4–3	@ San Jose Sharks (1999–2000)	25–17–7–1	W
51	January 27, 2000	4–6	@ Chicago Blackhawks (1999–2000)	25–18–7–1	L
52	January 29, 2000	0–4	@ St. Louis Blues (1999–2000)	25–19–7–1	L

February: 3–7–3–0 (home: 2–5–1–0; road: 1–2–2–0)

Game	Date	Score	Opponent	Record	Recap
53	February 1, 2000	2–1	Vancouver Canucks (1999–2000)	26–19–7–1	W
54	February 3, 2000	3–3 OT	San Jose Sharks (1999–2000)	26–19–8–1	T
55	February 8, 2000	0–2	Buffalo Sabres (1999–2000)	26–20–8–1	L
56	February 10, 2000	3–2	Calgary Flames (1999–2000)	27–20–8–1	W
57	February 13, 2000	3–4	Detroit Red Wings (1999–2000)	27–21–8–1	L
58	February 15, 2000	1–2	@ Washington Capitals (1999–2000)	27–22–8–1	L
59	February 17, 2000	5–5 OT	@ New Jersey Devils (1999–2000)	27–22–9–1	T
60	February 18, 2000	4–2	@ New York Rangers (1999–2000)	28–22–9–1	W
61	February 20, 2000	1–2	Dallas Stars (1999–2000)	28–23–9–1	L
62	February 22, 2000	3–4	Atlanta Thrashers (1999–2000)	28–24–9–1	L
63	February 25, 2000	2–4	@ St. Louis Blues (1999–2000)	28–25–9–1	L
64	February 27, 2000	1–1 OT	@ Dallas Stars (1999–2000)	28–25–10–1	T
65	February 29, 2000	1–3	Edmonton Oilers (1999–2000)	28–26–10–1	L

March: 10–2–1–0 (home: 6–2–1–0; road: 4–0–0–0)

Game	Date	Score	Opponent	Record	Recap
66	March 2, 2000	5–0	New Jersey Devils (1999–2000)	29–26–10–1	W
67	March 4, 2000	4–1	Tampa Bay Lightning (1999–2000)	30–26–10–1	W
68	March 7, 2000	8–3	@ Calgary Flames (1999–2000)	31–26–10–1	W
69	March 10, 2000	4–2	@ Edmonton Oilers (1999–2000)	32–26–10–1	W
70	March 12, 2000	3–1	Philadelphia Flyers (1999–2000)	33–26–10–1	W
71	March 14, 2000	4–2	Mighty Ducks of Anaheim (1999–2000)	34–26–10–1	W
72	March 16, 2000	2–2 OT	Nashville Predators (1999–2000)	34–26–11–1	T
73	March 18, 2000	3–4	Detroit Red Wings (1999–2000)	34–27–11–1	L
74	March 20, 2000	2–3	Vancouver Canucks (1999–2000)	34–28–11–1	L
75	March 23, 2000	4–2	@ Phoenix Coyotes (1999–2000)	35–28–11–1	W
76	March 26, 2000	2–1 OT	@ Dallas Stars (1999–2000)	36–28–11–1	W
77	March 27, 2000	3–1	Chicago Blackhawks (1999–2000)	37–28–11–1	W
78	March 29, 2000	3–2	Edmonton Oilers (1999–2000)	38–28–11–1	W

April: 4–0–0–0 (home: 2–0–0–0; road: 2–0–0–0)

Game	Date	Score	Opponent	Record	Recap
79	April 2, 2000	3–2 OT	Dallas Stars (1999–2000)	39–28–11–1	W
80	April 5, 2000	3–2	@ Edmonton Oilers (1999–2000)	40–28–11–1	W
81	April 7, 2000	3–1	@ Calgary Flames (1999–2000)	41–28–11–1	W
82	April 9, 2000	3–2	Detroit Red Wings (1999–2000)	42–28–11–1	W

Legend: W Win (2 points) L Loss (0 points) T Tie (1 point) OTL Overtime loss (1 point)

=== Playoffs ===
2000 Stanley Cup playoffs
Western Conference Quarterfinals vs. (6) Phoenix Coyotes – Avalanche win 4–1

Game	Date	Score	Opponent	Series	Recap
1	April 13, 2000	6–3	Phoenix Coyotes	Avalanche lead 1–0	W
2	April 15, 2000	3–1	Phoenix Coyotes	Avalanche lead 2–0	W
3	April 17, 2000	4–2	@ Phoenix Coyotes	Avalanche lead 3–0	W
4	April 19, 2000	2–3	@ Phoenix Coyotes	Avalanche lead 3–1	L
5	April 21, 2000	2–1	Phoenix Coyotes	Avalanche win 4–1	W

Western Conference Semifinals vs. (4) Detroit Red Wings: Avalanche win 4–1

Game	Date	Score	Opponent	Series	Recap
1	April 27, 2000	2–0	Detroit Red Wings	Avalanche lead 1–0	W
2	April 29, 2000	3–1	Detroit Red Wings	Avalanche lead 2–0	W
3	May 1, 2000	1–3	@ Detroit Red Wings	Avalanche lead 2–1	L
4	May 3, 2000	3–2 OT	@ Detroit Red Wings	Avalanche lead 3–1	W
5	May 5, 2000	4–2	Detroit Red Wings	Avalanche win 4–1	W

Western Conference Finals vs. (2) Dallas Stars – Stars win 4–3

Game	Date	Score	Opponent	Series	Recap
1	May 13, 2000	2–0	@ Dallas Stars	Avalanche lead 1–0	W
2	May 15, 2000	2–3	@ Dallas Stars	Series tied 1–1	L
3	May 19, 2000	2–0	Dallas Stars	Avalanche lead 2–1	W
4	May 21, 2000	1–4	Dallas Stars	Series tied 2–2	L
5	May 23, 2000	2–3 OT	@ Dallas Stars	Stars lead 3–2	L
6	May 25, 2000	2–1	Dallas Stars	Series tied 3–3	W
7	May 27, 2000	2–3	@ Dallas Stars	Stars win 4–3	L

Legend: W Win L Loss

== Player statistics ==
=== Scoring ===
- Position abbreviations: C = Center; D = Defense; G = Goaltender; LW = Left wing; RW = Right wing
- † = Joined team via a transaction (e.g., trade, waivers, signing) during the season. Stats reflect time with the Avalanche only.
- ‡ = Left team via a transaction (e.g., trade, waivers, release) during the season. Stats reflect time with the Avalanche only.

No.	Player	Pos	Regular season						Playoffs					
No.	Player	Pos	GP	G	A	Pts	+/-	PIM	GP	G	A	Pts	+/-	PIM
19	Joe Sakic	C	60	28	53	81	30	28	17	2	7	9	−5	8
23	Milan Hejduk	RW	82	36	36	72	14	16	17	5	4	9	−7	6
37	Chris Drury	C	82	20	47	67	8	42	17	4	10	14	7	4
8	Sandis Ozolinsh	D	82	16	36	52	17	46	17	5	5	10	1	20
40	Alex Tanguay	LW	76	17	34	51	6	22	17	2	1	3	−2	2
21	Peter Forsberg	C	49	14	37	51	9	52	16	7	8	15	9	12
18	Adam Deadmarsh	RW	71	18	27	45	−10	106	17	4	11	15	7	21
26	Stephane Yelle	C	79	8	14	22	9	28	17	1	2	3	3	4
25	Shjon Podein	LW	75	11	8	19	12	29	17	5	0	5	4	8
14	Dave Reid†	LW	65	11	7	18	12	28	17	1	3	4	4	0
15	Brian Rolston†‡	LW	50	8	10	18	−6	12	—	—	—	—	—	—
52	Adam Foote	D	59	5	13	18	5	98	16	0	7	7	6	28
55	Martin Skoula	D	80	3	13	16	5	20	17	0	2	2	−3	4
77	Ray Bourque†	D	14	8	6	14	9	6	13	1	8	9	4	8
24	Jon Klemm	D	73	5	7	12	26	34	17	2	1	3	4	9
11	Chris Dingman	LW	68	8	3	11	−2	132	—	—	—	—	—	—
22	Claude Lemieux‡	RW	13	3	6	9	0	4	—	—	—	—	—	—
29	Eric Messier	LW	61	3	6	9	0	24	14	0	1	1	1	4
7	Greg de Vries	D	69	2	7	9	−7	73	5	0	0	0	2	4
3	Aaron Miller	D	53	1	7	8	3	36	17	1	1	2	4	6
5	Alexei Gusarov	D	34	2	2	4	−8	10	—	—	—	—	—	—
38	Dan Hinote	RW	27	1	3	4	0	10	—	—	—	—	—	—
49	Serge Aubin	LW	15	2	1	3	1	6	17	0	1	1	1	6
38	Dave Andreychuk†	LW	14	1	2	3	−9	2	17	3	2	5	−3	18
36	Jeff Odgers	RW	62	1	2	3	−7	162	4	0	0	0	0	0
33	Patrick Roy	G	63	0	3	3		10	17	0	1	1		4
30	Marc Denis	G	23	0	2	2		6	—	—	—	—	—	—
12	Shean Donovan‡	RW	18	1	0	1	−4	8	—	—	—	—	—	—
17	Christian Matte	RW	5	0	1	1	−2	4	—	—	—	—	—	—
44	Sami Helenius	D	33	0	0	0	−5	46	—	—	—	—	—	—
39	Ville Nieminen	LW	1	0	0	0	0	0	—	—	—	—	—	—
43	Dan Smith	D	3	0	0	0	2	0	—	—	—	—	—	—
35	Rick Tabaracci†	G	2	0	0	0		0	—	—	—	—	—	—
50	Brian Willsie	RW	1	0	0	0	0	0	—	—	—	—	—	—

=== Goaltending ===
- † = Joined team via a transaction (e.g., trade, waivers, signing) during the season. Stats reflect time with the Avalanche only.

No.	Player	Regular season										Playoffs								
No.	Player	GP	W	L	T	SA	GA	GAA	SV%	SO	TOI	GP	W	L	SA	GA	GAA	SV%	SO	TOI
33	Patrick Roy	63	32	21	8	1640	141	2.28	.914	2	3704	17	11	6	431	31	1.79	.928	3	1039
30	Marc Denis	23	9	8	3	618	51	2.54	.917	3	1203	—	—	—	—	—	—	—	—	—
35	Rick Tabaracci†	2	1	0	0	18	2	2.00	.889	0	60	—	—	—	—	—	—	—	—	—

== Awards and records ==
=== Awards ===
Type	Award/honor	Recipient	Ref
League (in-season)	NHL All-Star Game selection	Peter Forsberg (Note: Forsberg did not play and was replaced by Patrik Elias of the New Jersey Devils.)	
League (in-season)	NHL All-Star Game selection	Milan Hejduk	
League (in-season)	NHL All-Star Game selection	Sandis Ozolinsh	
League (in-season)	NHL All-Star Game selection	Joe Sakic	
League (in-season)	NHL Player of the Month	Joe Sakic (March)	
League (in-season)	NHL Player of the Week	Peter Forsberg (January 17)	

=== Milestones ===
Milestone	Player	Date	Ref
First game	Dan Hinote	October 5, 1999	
First game	Martin Skoula	October 5, 1999	
First game	Alex Tanguay	October 5, 1999	
First game	Brian Willsie	January 9, 2000	
First game	Ville Nieminen	January 29, 2000	
1,000th point	Joe Sakic	December 27, 1999	
400th goal	Ray Bourque	March 18, 2000	
400th goal	Joe Sakic	March 23, 2000	

== Transactions ==
=== Trades ===
March 6, 2000	To Colorado Avalanche Ray Bourque, Dave Andreychuk	To Boston Bruins Brian Rolston, Martin Grenier, Samuel Pahlsson, First Round pick
June 7, 2000	To Colorado Avalanche 2nd round pick in 2000 (Tomas Kurka)	To Columbus Blue Jackets Marc Denis

== Draft picks ==
Colorado's draft picks at the 1999 NHL entry draft held at the FleetCenter in Boston, Massachusetts.

Round	#	Player	Nationality	College/Junior/Club team (League)
1	25	Mikhail Kuleshov	Russia	Severstal Cherepovets (Russia)
2	45	Martin Grenier	Canada	Quebec Remparts (QMJHL)
3	93	Branko Radivojevic	Slovakia	Belleville Bulls (OHL)
4	112	Sanny Lindstrom	Sweden	Huddinge IK (Sweden)
4	122	Kristian Kovac	Slovakia	HC Kosice Jr. (Slovakia)
5	142	William Magnuson	United States	Lake Superior State University (NCAA)
5	152	Jordan Krestanovich	Canada	Calgary Hitmen (WHL)
6	158	Anders Lovdahl	Sweden	HV71 (Sweden)
6	183	Riku Hahl	Finland	HPK (Finland)
7	212	Radim Vrbata	Czech Republic	Hull Olympiques (QMJHL)
8	240	Jeff Finger	United States	Green Bay Gamblers (USHL)

== See also ==
- 1999–2000 NHL season
