= 1999–2000 St. Louis Blues season =

National Hockey League team season

1999–2000 St. Louis Blues
- Presidents' Trophy winners
- Central Division champions
- Division: 1st Central
- Conference: 1st Western
- 1999–2000 record: 51–19–11–1
- Home record: 24–9–7–1
- Road record: 27–10–4–0
- Goals for: 248
- Goals against: 165

Team information
- General manager: Larry Pleau
- Coach: Joel Quenneville
- Captain: Chris Pronger
- Alternate captains: Al MacInnis; Pierre Turgeon
- Arena: Kiel Center
- Average attendance: 18,590
- Minor league affiliates: Worcester IceCats; Peoria Rivermen

Team leaders
- Goals: Pavol Demitra (28)
- Assists: Chris Pronger (48)
- Points: Pavol Demitra (75)
- Penalty minutes: Tyson Nash (150)
- Plus/minus: Chris Pronger (+52)
- Wins: Roman Turek (42)
- Goals against average: Roman Turek (1.95)

The 1999–2000 St. Louis Blues season was the 33rd season for the National Hockey League (NHL) franchise that was established on June 5, 1967.

The Blues qualified for the Stanley Cup playoffs for the 21st consecutive season after finishing the regular season with a record of 51–19–11–1 (114 points), sufficient to win the Central Division title as well as the Presidents' Trophy for the highest points total in the NHL. It was the Blues' first division title since the 1986–87 season, when they won the Norris Division, and their last until the 2011–12 season.

== Regular season ==
The Blues allowed the fewest goals during the regular season with 165, and had the most shutouts with nine. They also tied the Washington Capitals for the fewest short-handed goals allowed with just three.

=== Season standings ===
Central Division
No.	CR		GP	W	L	T	OTL	GF	GA	Pts
1	1	**St. Louis Blues**	82	51	19	11	1	248	165	114
2	4	**Detroit Red Wings**	82	48	22	10	2	278	210	108
3	11	Chicago Blackhawks	82	33	37	10	2	242	245	78
4	13	Nashville Predators	82	28	40	7	7	199	240	70

Note: CR = Conference rank; GP = Games played; W = Wins; L = Losses; T = Ties; OTL = Overtime loss; GF = Goals for; GA = Goals against; PIM = Penalties in minutes; Pts = Points
Bolded teams qualified for the playoffs.

Western Conference
R		Div	GP	W	L	T	OTL	GF	GA	Pts
**1**	**p – St. Louis Blues**	**CEN**	**82**	**51**	**19**	**11**	**1**	**248**	**165**	**114**
**2**	**y – Dallas Stars**	**PAC**	**82**	**43**	**23**	**10**	**6**	**211**	**184**	**102**
**3**	**y – Colorado Avalanche**	**NW**	**82**	**42**	**28**	**11**	**1**	**233**	**201**	**96**
**4**	**Detroit Red Wings**	**CEN**	**82**	**48**	**22**	**10**	**2**	**278**	**210**	**108**
**5**	**Los Angeles Kings**	**PAC**	**82**	**39**	**27**	**12**	**4**	**245**	**228**	**94**
**6**	**Phoenix Coyotes**	**PAC**	**82**	**39**	**31**	**8**	**4**	**232**	**228**	**90**
**7**	**Edmonton Oilers**	**NW**	**82**	**32**	**26**	**16**	**8**	**226**	**212**	**88**
**8**	**San Jose Sharks**	**PAC**	**82**	**35**	**30**	**10**	**7**	**225**	**214**	**87**
8.5
9	Mighty Ducks of Anaheim	PAC	82	34	33	12	3	217	227	83
10	Vancouver Canucks	NW	82	30	29	15	8	227	237	83
11	Chicago Blackhawks	CEN	82	33	37	10	2	242	245	78
12	Calgary Flames	NW	82	31	36	10	5	211	256	77
13	Nashville Predators	CEN	82	28	40	7	7	199	240	70

Divisions: CEN – Central, PAC – Pacific, NW – Northwest

bold – Qualified for playoffs; p – Won Presidents' Trophy; y – Won division

== Playoffs ==
The number one seeded Blues were upset in seven games by the eighth seeded San Jose Sharks in the first round.

== Schedule and results ==
=== Regular season ===
1999–2000 regular season
October: 7–4–0–0 (home: 5–2–0–0; road: 2–2–0–0)

Game	Date	Score	Opponent	Record	Recap
1	October 2, 1999	1–2	Phoenix Coyotes (1999–2000)	0–1–0–0	L
2	October 4, 1999	2–3	Los Angeles Kings (1999–2000)	0–2–0–0	L
3	October 6, 1999	4–1	@ Calgary Flames (1999–2000)	1–2–0–0	W
4	October 9, 1999	4–2	@ Edmonton Oilers (1999–2000)	2–2–0–0	W
5	October 13, 1999	2–4	@ Detroit Red Wings (1999–2000)	2–3–0–0	L
6	October 16, 1999	4–2	Toronto Maple Leafs (1999–2000)	3–3–0–0	W
7	October 19, 1999	7–1	Calgary Flames (1999–2000)	4–3–0–0	W
8	October 21, 1999	3–2 OT	Edmonton Oilers (1999–2000)	5–3–0–0	W
9	October 23, 1999	3–1	New Jersey Devils (1999–2000)	6–3–0–0	W
10	October 27, 1999	1–2	@ New Jersey Devils (1999–2000)	6–4–0–0	L
11	October 30, 1999	5–4 OT	Detroit Red Wings (1999–2000)	7–4–0–0	W

November: 8–3–2–0 (home: 3–1–2–0; road: 5–2–0–0)

Game	Date	Score	Opponent	Record	Recap
12	November 3, 1999	0–5	@ Colorado Avalanche (1999–2000)	7–5–0–0	L
13	November 5, 1999	2–1	@ Edmonton Oilers (1999–2000)	8–5–0–0	W
14	November 7, 1999	6–1	@ Vancouver Canucks (1999–2000)	9–5–0–0	W
15	November 9, 1999	2–5	Dallas Stars (1999–2000)	9–6–0–0	L
16	November 12, 1999	2–2 OT	Edmonton Oilers (1999–2000)	9–6–1–0	T
17	November 13, 1999	5–3	@ New York Islanders (1999–2000)	10–6–1–0	W
18	November 17, 1999	3–2	@ Toronto Maple Leafs (1999–2000)	11–6–1–0	W
19	November 18, 1999	3–0	Florida Panthers (1999–2000)	12–6–1–0	W
20	November 20, 1999	1–1 OT	San Jose Sharks (1999–2000)	12–6–2–0	T
21	November 22, 1999	3–2 OT	Nashville Predators (1999–2000)	13–6–2–0	W
22	November 24, 1999	2–4	@ Detroit Red Wings (1999–2000)	13–7–2–0	L
23	November 26, 1999	2–0	@ Buffalo Sabres (1999–2000)	14–7–2–0	W
24	November 27, 1999	8–3	Chicago Blackhawks (1999–2000)	15–7–2–0	W

December: 7–4–2–0 (home: 5–2–1–0; road: 2–2–1–0)

Game	Date	Score	Opponent	Record	Recap
25	December 2, 1999	3–1	Nashville Predators (1999–2000)	16–7–2–0	W
26	December 4, 1999	4–2	San Jose Sharks (1999–2000)	17–7–2–0	W
27	December 5, 1999	2–3	@ Philadelphia Flyers (1999–2000)	17–8–2–0	L
28	December 7, 1999	2–4	Carolina Hurricanes (1999–2000)	17–9–2–0	L
29	December 10, 1999	4–2	@ Nashville Predators (1999–2000)	18–9–2–0	W
30	December 11, 1999	4–2	Dallas Stars (1999–2000)	19–9–2–0	W
31	December 14, 1999	1–1 OT	Calgary Flames (1999–2000)	19–9–3–0	T
32	December 18, 1999	4–0	Boston Bruins (1999–2000)	20–9–3–0	W
33	December 21, 1999	6–0	@ Phoenix Coyotes (1999–2000)	21–9–3–0	W
34	December 23, 1999	2–2 OT	@ Nashville Predators (1999–2000)	21–9–4–0	T
35	December 26, 1999	2–3	Nashville Predators (1999–2000)	21–10–4–0	L
36	December 27, 1999	1–5	@ Colorado Avalanche (1999–2000)	21–11–4–0	L
37	December 30, 1999	2–1 OT	San Jose Sharks (1999–2000)	22–11–4–0	W

January: 9–3–2–0 (home: 3–1–1–0; road: 6–2–1–0)

Game	Date	Score	Opponent	Record	Recap
38	January 1, 2000	1–1 OT	@ Washington Capitals (1999–2000)	22–11–5–0	T
39	January 3, 2000	5–2	@ New York Rangers (1999–2000)	23–11–5–0	W
40	January 4, 2000	2–2 OT	Los Angeles Kings (1999–2000)	23–11–6–0	T
41	January 6, 2000	4–3	Montreal Canadiens (1999–2000)	24–11–6–0	W
42	January 8, 2000	4–2	Vancouver Canucks (1999–2000)	25–11–6–0	W
43	January 11, 2000	5–2	@ San Jose Sharks (1999–2000)	26–11–6–0	W
44	January 13, 2000	3–2	@ Los Angeles Kings (1999–2000)	27–11–6–0	W
45	January 14, 2000	1–3	@ Mighty Ducks of Anaheim (1999–2000)	27–12–6–0	L
46	January 19, 2000	1–3	@ Pittsburgh Penguins (1999–2000)	27–13–6–0	L
47	January 21, 2000	3–0	@ Chicago Blackhawks (1999–2000)	28–13–6–0	W
48	January 22, 2000	1–4	New York Rangers (1999–2000)	28–14–6–0	L
49	January 26, 2000	4–1	@ Ottawa Senators (1999–2000)	29–14–6–0	W
50	January 28, 2000	3–1	@ Dallas Stars (1999–2000)	30–14–6–0	W
51	January 29, 2000	4–0	Colorado Avalanche (1999–2000)	31–14–6–0	W

February: 10–2–0–0 (home: 4–2–0–0; road: 6–0–0–0)

Game	Date	Score	Opponent	Record	Recap
52	February 1, 2000	5–4 OT	@ Calgary Flames (1999–2000)	32–14–6–0	W
53	February 3, 2000	5–2	@ Vancouver Canucks (1999–2000)	33–14–6–0	W
54	February 8, 2000	4–1	@ Detroit Red Wings (1999–2000)	34–14–6–0	W
55	February 10, 2000	0–2	Detroit Red Wings (1999–2000)	34–15–6–0	L
56	February 12, 2000	6–3	Mighty Ducks of Anaheim (1999–2000)	35–15–6–0	W
57	February 15, 2000	4–1	Atlanta Thrashers (1999–2000)	36–15–6–0	W
58	February 18, 2000	2–1	@ Nashville Predators (1999–2000)	37–15–6–0	W
59	February 21, 2000	4–2	@ Mighty Ducks of Anaheim (1999–2000)	38–15–6–0	W
60	February 23, 2000	4–1	@ San Jose Sharks (1999–2000)	39–15–6–0	W
61	February 25, 2000	4–2	Colorado Avalanche (1999–2000)	40–15–6–0	W
62	February 27, 2000	1–4	Chicago Blackhawks (1999–2000)	40–16–6–0	L
63	February 29, 2000	3–2	Philadelphia Flyers (1999–2000)	41–16–6–0	W

March: 8–2–4–0 (home: 2–1–2–0; road: 6–1–2–0)

Game	Date	Score	Opponent	Record	Recap
64	March 2, 2000	5–2	@ Atlanta Thrashers (1999–2000)	42–16–6–0	W
65	March 4, 2000	1–1 OT	@ Florida Panthers (1999–2000)	42–16–7–0	T
66	March 7, 2000	4–0	Phoenix Coyotes (1999–2000)	43–16–7–0	W
67	March 9, 2000	2–2 OT	Vancouver Canucks (1999–2000)	43–16–8–0	T
68	March 11, 2000	1–1 OT	Mighty Ducks of Anaheim (1999–2000)	43–16–9–0	T
69	March 12, 2000	2–4	@ Dallas Stars (1999–2000)	43–17–9–0	L
70	March 15, 2000	5–3	@ Phoenix Coyotes (1999–2000)	44–17–9–0	W
71	March 17, 2000	4–0	@ Los Angeles Kings (1999–2000)	45–17–9–0	W
72	March 20, 2000	2–1	Washington Capitals (1999–2000)	46–17–9–0	W
73	March 22, 2000	2–1	@ Carolina Hurricanes (1999–2000)	47–17–9–0	W
74	March 24, 2000	5–1	@ Tampa Bay Lightning (1999–2000)	48–17–9–0	W
75	March 26, 2000	1–1 OT	@ Chicago Blackhawks (1999–2000)	48–17–10–0	T
76	March 29, 2000	2–3	Toronto Maple Leafs (1999–2000)	48–18–10–0	L
77	March 30, 2000	3–2	@ Boston Bruins (1999–2000)	49–18–10–0	W

April: 2–1–1–1 (home: 2–0–1–1; road: 0–1–0–0)

Game	Date	Score	Opponent	Record	Recap
78	April 1, 2000	0–0 OT	Detroit Red Wings (1999–2000)	49–18–11–0	T
79	April 2, 2000	4–1	Ottawa Senators (1999–2000)	50–18–11–0	W
80	April 5, 2000	6–5	Calgary Flames (1999–2000)	51–18–11–0	W
81	April 7, 2000	3–4 OT	Chicago Blackhawks (1999–2000)	51–18–11–1	OTL
82	April 9, 2000	1–3	@ Chicago Blackhawks (1999–2000)	51–19–11–1	L

Legend: W Win (2 points) L Loss (0 points) T Tie (1 point) OTL Overtime loss (1 point)

=== Playoffs ===
2000 Stanley Cup playoffs
Western Conference Quarterfinals vs. (8) San Jose Sharks: Sharks win 4–3

Game	Date	Score	Opponent	Series	Recap
1	April 12, 2000	5–3	San Jose Sharks	Blues lead 1–0	W
2	April 15, 2000	2–4	San Jose Sharks	Series tied 1–1	L
3	April 17, 2000	1–2	@ San Jose Sharks	Sharks lead 2–1	L
4	April 19, 2000	2–3	@ San Jose Sharks	Sharks lead 3–1	L
5	April 21, 2000	5–3	San Jose Sharks	Sharks lead 3–2	W
6	April 23, 2000	6–2	@ San Jose Sharks	Series tied 3–3	W
7	April 25, 2000	1–3	San Jose Sharks	Sharks win 4–3	L

Legend: W Win L Loss

== Player statistics ==
=== Scoring ===
- Position abbreviations: C = Center; D = Defense; G = Goaltender; LW = Left wing; RW = Right wing
- † = Joined team via a transaction (e.g., trade, waivers, signing) during the season. Stats reflect time with the Blues only.
- ‡ = Left team via a transaction (e.g., trade, waivers, release) during the season. Stats reflect time with the Blues only.

No.	Player	Pos	Regular season						Playoffs					
No.	Player	Pos	GP	G	A	Pts	+/-	PIM	GP	G	A	Pts	+/-	PIM
38	Pavol Demitra	LW	71	28	47	75	34	8	—	—	—	—	—	—
77	Pierre Turgeon	C	52	26	40	66	30	8	7	0	7	7	−2	0
44	Chris Pronger	D	79	14	48	62	52	92	7	3	4	7	0	32
26	Michal Handzus	C	81	25	28	53	19	44	7	0	3	3	−2	6
48	Scott Young	RW	75	24	15	39	12	18	6	6	2	8	1	8
23	Lubos Bartecko	LW	67	16	23	39	24	51	7	1	1	2	−1	0
2	Al MacInnis	D	61	11	28	39	20	34	7	1	3	4	−1	14
32	Mike Eastwood	C	79	19	15	34	5	32	7	1	1	2	−2	6
17	Jochen Hecht	LW	63	13	21	34	20	28	7	4	6	10	1	2
22	Craig Conroy	C	79	12	15	27	5	36	7	0	2	2	1	2
19	Stephane Richer†	RW	36	8	17	25	7	14	3	1	0	1	0	0
28	Todd Reirden	D	56	4	21	25	18	32	4	0	1	1	−1	0
15	Marty Reasoner	C	32	10	14	24	9	20	7	2	1	3	3	4
33	Scott Pellerin	LW	80	8	15	23	9	48	7	0	0	0	1	2
21	Jamal Mayers	RW	79	7	10	17	0	90	7	0	4	4	1	2
9	Tyson Nash	LW	66	4	9	13	6	150	6	1	0	1	−1	24
27	Terry Yake‡	C	26	4	9	13	2	22	—	—	—	—	—	—
6	Dave Ellett†	D	52	2	8	10	−4	12	7	0	1	1	1	2
37	Jeff Finley	D	74	2	8	10	26	38	7	0	2	2	0	4
12	Derek King†	LW	19	2	7	9	0	6	—	—	—	—	—	—
4	Marc Bergevin	D	81	1	8	9	27	75	7	0	1	1	0	6
7	Ricard Persson	D	41	0	8	8	−2	38	3	1	0	1	1	0
47	Ladislav Nagy	LW	11	2	4	6	2	2	6	1	1	2	−1	0
14	Geoff Courtnall‡	LW	6	2	2	4	3	6	—	—	—	—	—	—
41	Bob Bassen†	C	27	1	3	4	−3	26	—	—	—	—	—	—
36	Bryan Helmer	D	15	1	1	2	−3	10	—	—	—	—	—	—
19	Chris McAlpine‡	D	21	1	1	2	1	14	—	—	—	—	—	—
25	Pascal Rheaume	C	7	1	1	2	−2	6	—	—	—	—	—	—
39	Kelly Chase	RW	25	0	1	1	−5	118	—	—	—	—	—	—
1	Roman Turek	G	67	0	1	1		4	7	0	0	0		0
46	Derek Bekar	LW	1	0	0	0	0	0	—	—	—	—	—	—
10	Jim Campbell	RW	2	0	0	0	0	9	—	—	—	—	—	—
29	Jamie McLennan	G	19	0	0	0		2	—	—	—	—	—	—
20	Rudy Poeschek	D	12	0	0	0	−3	24	—	—	—	—	—	—

=== Goaltending ===
No.	Player	Regular season										Playoffs								
No.	Player	GP	W	L	T	SA	GA	GAA	SV%	SO	TOI	GP	W	L	SA	GA	GAA	SV%	SO	TOI
1	Roman Turek	67	42	15	9	1470	129	1.95	.912	7	3960	7	3	4	161	19	2.75	.882	0	415
29	Jamie McLennan	19	9	5	2	341	33	1.96	.903	2	1009	—	—	—	—	—	—	—	—	—

== Awards and records ==
=== Awards ===
Type	Award/honor	Recipient	Ref
League (annual)	Hart Memorial Trophy	Chris Pronger	
League (annual)	Jack Adams Award	Joel Quenneville	
League (annual)	James Norris Memorial Trophy	Chris Pronger	
League (annual)	Lady Byng Memorial Trophy	Pavol Demitra	
League (annual)	NHL First All-Star Team	Chris Pronger (Defense)	
League (annual)	NHL Second All-Star Team	Roman Turek (Goaltender)	
League (annual)	NHL Plus-Minus Award	Chris Pronger	
League (annual)	William M. Jennings Trophy	Roman Turek	
League (in-season)	NHL All-Star Game selection	Pavol Demitra	
League (in-season)	NHL All-Star Game selection	Al MacInnis	
League (in-season)	NHL All-Star Game selection	Chris Pronger (Note: Pronger was voted to the starting lineup.)	
League (in-season)	NHL All-Star Game selection	Joel Quenneville (coach)	
League (in-season)	NHL All-Star Game selection	Roman Turek (Note: Turek was an injury replacement for Dominik Hasek of the Buffalo Sabres.)	
League (in-season)	NHL All-Star Game selection	Pierre Turgeon (Note: Turgeon did not play and was replaced by Ray Whitney of the Florida Panthers.)	
League (in-season)	NHL Player of the Week	Roman Turek (November 22)	
League (in-season)	NHL Player of the Week	Pierre Turgeon (December 6)	
League (in-season)	NHL Player of the Week	Roman Turek (March 27)	

=== Milestones ===
Milestone	Player	Date	Ref
1,000th point	Pierre Turgeon	October 9, 1999	
400th goal	Pierre Turgeon	October 13, 1999	
400th goal	Stephane Richer	January 26, 2000	
First game	Derek Bekar	November 22, 1999	
First game	Ladislav Nagy	November 22, 1999	

== Draft picks ==
St. Louis's draft picks at the 1999 NHL entry draft held at the FleetCenter in Boston, Massachusetts.

Round	#	Player	Nationality	College/Junior/Club team (League)
1	17	Barret Jackman	Canada	Regina Pats (WHL)
3	85	Peter Smrek	Slovakia	Des Moines Buccaneers (USHL)
4	114	Chad Starling	Canada	Kamloops Blazers (WHL)
5	143	Trevor Byrne	United States	Deerfield Academy (USHS-MA)
6	180	Tore Vikingstad	Norway	Färjestad BK (Sweden)
7	203	Phil Osaer	United States	Ferris State University (WCHA)
8	221	Colin Hemingway	Canada	Surrey Eagles (BCJHL)
8	232	Alexander Khavanov	Russia	Dynamo Moscow (Russia)
9	260	Brian McMeekin	Canada	Cornell University (ECAC)
9	270	James Desmarais	Canada	Rouyn-Noranda Huskies (QMJHL)
