= 1999–2000 Phoenix Coyotes season =

NHL hockey team season

1999–2000 Phoenix Coyotes
- Division: 3rd Pacific
- Conference: 6th Western
- 1999–2000 record: 39–31–8–4
- Home record: 22–16–2–1
- Road record: 17–15–6–3
- Goals for: 232
- Goals against: 228

Team information
- General manager: Bobby Smith
- Coach: Bob Francis
- Captain: Keith Tkachuk
- Arena: America West Arena
- Average attendance: 14,991
- Minor league affiliates: Springfield Falcons; Mississippi Sea Wolves

Team leaders
- Goals: Jeremy Roenick (34)
- Assists: Jeremy Roenick (44)
- Points: Jeremy Roenick (78)
- Penalty minutes: Jeremy Roenick (102)
- Plus/minus: Teppo Numminen (+21)
- Wins: Sean Burke (17)
- Goals against average: Mikhail Shtalenkov (2.39)

The 1999–2000 Phoenix Coyotes season was the Coyotes' fourth season in Phoenix, the franchise's 21st season in the NHL and 28th overall. The Coyotes made the Stanley Cup playoffs, losing in the first round to Colorado.

== Regular season ==
The Coyotes struggled on the power play, scoring only 37 power-play goals, tied with the Buffalo Sabres for 28th in the League.

=== Final standings ===
Pacific Division
No.	CR		GP	W	L	T	OTL	GF	GA	Pts
1	2	**Dallas Stars**	82	43	23	10	6	211	184	102
2	5	**Los Angeles Kings**	82	39	27	12	4	245	228	94
3	6	**Phoenix Coyotes**	82	39	31	8	4	232	228	90
4	8	**San Jose Sharks**	82	35	30	10	7	225	214	87
5	9	Mighty Ducks of Anaheim	82	34	33	12	3	217	227	83

Note: CR = Conference rank; GP = Games played; W = Wins; L = Losses; T = Ties; OTL = Overtime loss; GF = Goals for; GA = Goals against; PIM = Penalties in minutes; Pts = Points
Bolded teams qualified for the playoffs.

Western Conference
R		Div	GP	W	L	T	OTL	GF	GA	Pts
**1**	**p – St. Louis Blues**	**CEN**	**82**	**51**	**19**	**11**	**1**	**248**	**165**	**114**
**2**	**y – Dallas Stars**	**PAC**	**82**	**43**	**23**	**10**	**6**	**211**	**184**	**102**
**3**	**y – Colorado Avalanche**	**NW**	**82**	**42**	**28**	**11**	**1**	**233**	**201**	**96**
**4**	**Detroit Red Wings**	**CEN**	**82**	**48**	**22**	**10**	**2**	**278**	**210**	**108**
**5**	**Los Angeles Kings**	**PAC**	**82**	**39**	**27**	**12**	**4**	**245**	**228**	**94**
**6**	**Phoenix Coyotes**	**PAC**	**82**	**39**	**31**	**8**	**4**	**232**	**228**	**90**
**7**	**Edmonton Oilers**	**NW**	**82**	**32**	**26**	**16**	**8**	**226**	**212**	**88**
**8**	**San Jose Sharks**	**PAC**	**82**	**35**	**30**	**10**	**7**	**225**	**214**	**87**
8.5
9	Mighty Ducks of Anaheim	PAC	82	34	33	12	3	217	227	83
10	Vancouver Canucks	NW	82	30	29	15	8	227	237	83
11	Chicago Blackhawks	CEN	82	33	37	10	2	242	245	78
12	Calgary Flames	NW	82	31	36	10	5	211	256	77
13	Nashville Predators	CEN	82	28	40	7	7	199	240	70

Divisions: CEN – Central, PAC – Pacific, NW – Northwest

bold – Qualified for playoffs; p – Won Presidents' Trophy; y – Won division

== Playoffs ==
The first two games were in Colorado. Games 1 and 2 were won by Colorado. Game 1 was won by a score of 6–3, and game 2 was won by a score of 3–1. Games 3 and 4 were in Phoenix. Colorado was victorious in game 3 4–2, but the Coyotes won game 4 3–2. Back in Colorado, the Avalanche went on to win 2–1 and take the series 4–1.

== Schedule and results ==
=== Regular season ===
1999–2000 regular season
October: 8–2–3–0 (home: 3–0–1–0; road: 5–2–2–0)

Game	Date	Score	Opponent	Record	Recap
1	October 2, 1999	2–1	@ St. Louis Blues (1999–2000)	1–0–0–0	W
2	October 5, 1999	4–0	Mighty Ducks of Anaheim (1999–2000)	2–0–0–0	W
3	October 8, 1999	3–3 OT	@ Chicago Blackhawks (1999–2000)	2–0–1–0	T
4	October 10, 1999	2–4	@ New York Rangers (1999–2000)	2–1–1–0	L
5	October 11, 1999	2–2 OT	@ Buffalo Sabres (1999–2000)	2–1–2–0	T
6	October 14, 1999	4–3	Ottawa Senators (1999–2000)	3–1–2–0	W
7	October 16, 1999	2–1	Boston Bruins (1999–2000)	4–1–2–0	W
8	October 22, 1999	6–3	@ Los Angeles Kings (1999–2000)	5–1–2–0	W
9	October 23, 1999	2–2 OT	Washington Capitals (1999–2000)	5–1–3–0	T
10	October 26, 1999	1–3	@ Edmonton Oilers (1999–2000)	5–2–3–0	L
11	October 28, 1999	4–1	@ Vancouver Canucks (1999–2000)	6–2–3–0	W
12	October 30, 1999	5–3	@ Colorado Avalanche (1999–2000)	7–2–3–0	W
13	October 31, 1999	3–0	@ Mighty Ducks of Anaheim (1999–2000)	8–2–3–0	W

November: 8–4–0–0 (home: 5–3–0–0; road: 3–1–0–0)

Game	Date	Score	Opponent	Record	Recap
14	November 3, 1999	3–6	@ San Jose Sharks (1999–2000)	8–3–3–0	L
15	November 5, 1999	4–6	Dallas Stars (1999–2000)	8–4–3–0	L
16	November 10, 1999	5–4 OT	Edmonton Oilers (1999–2000)	9–4–3–0	W
17	November 12, 1999	2–3	Vancouver Canucks (1999–2000)	9–5–3–0	L
18	November 14, 1999	2–3	Los Angeles Kings (1999–2000)	9–6–3–0	L
19	November 16, 1999	2–1	Calgary Flames (1999–2000)	10–6–3–0	W
20	November 18, 1999	3–2	@ Los Angeles Kings (1999–2000)	11–6–3–0	W
21	November 20, 1999	3–1	Chicago Blackhawks (1999–2000)	12–6–3–0	W
22	November 25, 1999	4–2	New Jersey Devils (1999–2000)	13–6–3–0	W
23	November 26, 1999	7–0	Colorado Avalanche (1999–2000)	14–6–3–0	W
24	November 28, 1999	4–3	@ Detroit Red Wings (1999–2000)	15–6–3–0	W
25	November 30, 1999	6–3	@ Nashville Predators (1999–2000)	16–6–3–0	W

December: 5–6–1–0 (home: 2–3–1–0; road: 3–3–0–0)

Game	Date	Score	Opponent	Record	Recap
26	December 2, 1999	3–1	Tampa Bay Lightning (1999–2000)	17–6–3–0	W
27	December 4, 1999	1–2	Mighty Ducks of Anaheim (1999–2000)	17–7–3–0	L
28	December 6, 1999	3–2	@ Dallas Stars (1999–2000)	18–7–3–0	W
29	December 8, 1999	1–6	Florida Panthers (1999–2000)	18–8–3–0	L
30	December 11, 1999	2–4	@ Pittsburgh Penguins (1999–2000)	18–9–3–0	L
31	December 13, 1999	0–2	@ Boston Bruins (1999–2000)	18–10–3–0	L
32	December 16, 1999	3–5	@ Philadelphia Flyers (1999–2000)	18–11–3–0	L
33	December 19, 1999	4–3	San Jose Sharks (1999–2000)	19–11–3–0	W
34	December 21, 1999	0–6	St. Louis Blues (1999–2000)	19–12–3–0	L
35	December 22, 1999	8–2	@ Mighty Ducks of Anaheim (1999–2000)	20–12–3–0	W
36	December 26, 1999	3–2 OT	@ Los Angeles Kings (1999–2000)	21–12–3–0	W
37	December 28, 1999	2–2 OT	New York Rangers (1999–2000)	21–12–4–0	T

January: 7–4–2–1 (home: 5–1–0–0; road: 2–3–2–1)

Game	Date	Score	Opponent	Record	Recap
38	January 1, 2000	4–5	Edmonton Oilers (1999–2000)	21–13–4–0	L
39	January 4, 2000	5–2	@ Detroit Red Wings (1999–2000)	22–13–4–0	W
40	January 6, 2000	2–5	@ Ottawa Senators (1999–2000)	22–14–4–0	L
41	January 8, 2000	3–4	@ New Jersey Devils (1999–2000)	22–15–4–0	L
42	January 10, 2000	2–2 OT	@ New York Islanders (1999–2000)	22–15–5–0	T
43	January 12, 2000	3–1	Pittsburgh Penguins (1999–2000)	23–15–5–0	W
44	January 15, 2000	4–2	Mighty Ducks of Anaheim (1999–2000)	24–15–5–0	W
45	January 17, 2000	0–2	@ Colorado Avalanche (1999–2000)	24–16–5–0	L
46	January 18, 2000	4–4 OT	@ Nashville Predators (1999–2000)	24–16–6–0	T
47	January 20, 2000	2–1	Buffalo Sabres (1999–2000)	25–16–6–0	W
48	January 23, 2000	3–2 OT	San Jose Sharks (1999–2000)	26–16–6–0	W
49	January 27, 2000	4–2	@ Carolina Hurricanes (1999–2000)	27–16–6–0	W
50	January 28, 2000	2–3 OT	@ Washington Capitals (1999–2000)	27–16–6–1	OTL
51	January 31, 2000	5–3	Detroit Red Wings (1999–2000)	28–16–6–1	W

February: 4–6–1–0 (home: 2–3–0–0; road: 2–3–1–0)

Game	Date	Score	Opponent	Record	Recap
52	February 1, 2000	1–0 OT	@ San Jose Sharks (1999–2000)	29–16–6–1	W
53	February 3, 2000	0–2	Dallas Stars (1999–2000)	29–17–6–1	L
54	February 9, 2000	2–5	Los Angeles Kings (1999–2000)	29–18–6–1	L
55	February 12, 2000	4–3	Calgary Flames (1999–2000)	30–18–6–1	W
56	February 14, 2000	1–3	Detroit Red Wings (1999–2000)	30–19–6–1	L
57	February 18, 2000	4–3	@ Dallas Stars (1999–2000)	31–19–6–1	W
58	February 20, 2000	4–2	Atlanta Thrashers (1999–2000)	32–19–6–1	W
59	February 22, 2000	0–1	@ Montreal Canadiens (1999–2000)	32–20–6–1	L
60	February 23, 2000	3–5	@ Toronto Maple Leafs (1999–2000)	32–21–6–1	L
61	February 25, 2000	3–3 OT	@ Calgary Flames (1999–2000)	32–21–7–1	T
62	February 27, 2000	1–2	@ Vancouver Canucks (1999–2000)	32–22–7–1	L

March: 5–8–0–2 (home: 3–5–0–1; road: 2–3–0–1)

Game	Date	Score	Opponent	Record	Recap
63	March 1, 2000	7–5	Carolina Hurricanes (1999–2000)	33–22–7–1	W
64	March 3, 2000	1–4	Dallas Stars (1999–2000)	33–23–7–1	L
65	March 5, 2000	3–7	@ Chicago Blackhawks (1999–2000)	33–24–7–1	L
66	March 7, 2000	0–4	@ St. Louis Blues (1999–2000)	33–25–7–1	L
67	March 9, 2000	5–0	New York Islanders (1999–2000)	34–25–7–1	W
68	March 11, 2000	5–0	Vancouver Canucks (1999–2000)	35–25–7–1	W
69	March 13, 2000	1–4	Philadelphia Flyers (1999–2000)	35–26–7–1	L
70	March 15, 2000	3–5	St. Louis Blues (1999–2000)	35–27–7–1	L
71	March 17, 2000	3–4 OT	Nashville Predators (1999–2000)	35–27–7–2	OTL
72	March 21, 2000	0–3	Chicago Blackhawks (1999–2000)	35–28–7–2	L
73	March 23, 2000	2–4	Colorado Avalanche (1999–2000)	35–29–7–2	L
74	March 24, 2000	1–5	@ San Jose Sharks (1999–2000)	35–30–7–2	L
75	March 26, 2000	3–4 OT	@ Mighty Ducks of Anaheim (1999–2000)	35–30–7–3	OTL
76	March 29, 2000	3–2	@ Atlanta Thrashers (1999–2000)	36–30–7–3	W
77	March 31, 2000	3–1	@ Calgary Flames (1999–2000)	37–30–7–3	W

April: 2–1–1–1 (home: 2–1–0–0; road: 0–0–1–1)

Game	Date	Score	Opponent	Record	Recap
78	April 1, 2000	3–4 OT	@ Edmonton Oilers (1999–2000)	37–30–7–4	OTL
79	April 3, 2000	2–1	Los Angeles Kings (1999–2000)	38–30–7–4	W
80	April 5, 2000	3–2	Nashville Predators (1999–2000)	39–30–7–4	W
81	April 7, 2000	1–3	San Jose Sharks (1999–2000)	39–31–7–4	L
82	April 9, 2000	2–2 OT	@ Dallas Stars (1999–2000)	39–31–8–4	T

Legend: W Win (2 points) L Loss (0 points) T Tie (1 point) OTL Overtime loss (1 point)

=== Playoffs ===
2000 Stanley Cup playoffs
Western Conference Quarterfinals vs. (3) Colorado Avalanche – Avalanche win 4–1

Game	Date	Score	Opponent	Series	Recap
1	April 13, 2000	3–6	@ Colorado Avalanche	Avalanche lead 1–0	L
2	April 15, 2000	1–3	@ Colorado Avalanche	Avalanche lead 2–0	L
3	April 17, 2000	2–4	Colorado Avalanche	Avalanche lead 3–0	L
4	April 19, 2000	3–2	Colorado Avalanche	Avalanche lead 3–1	W
5	April 21, 2000	1–2	@ Colorado Avalanche	Avalanche win 4–1	L

Legend: W Win L Loss

== Player statistics ==
=== Scoring ===
- Position abbreviations: C = Center; D = Defense; G = Goaltender; LW = Left wing; RW = Right wing
- † = Joined team via a transaction (e.g., trade, waivers, signing) during the season. Stats reflect time with the Coyotes only.
- ‡ = Left team via a transaction (e.g., trade, waivers, release) during the season. Stats reflect time with the Coyotes only.

No.	Player	Pos	Regular season						Playoffs					
No.	Player	Pos	GP	G	A	Pts	+/-	PIM	GP	G	A	Pts	+/-	PIM
97	Jeremy Roenick	C	75	34	44	78	11	102	5	2	2	4	−4	10
19	Shane Doan	RW	81	26	25	51	6	66	4	1	2	3	−2	8
39	Travis Green	C	78	25	21	46	−4	45	5	2	1	3	0	2
17	Greg Adams	LW	69	19	27	46	−1	14	5	0	0	0	−1	0
11	Dallas Drake	RW	79	15	30	45	11	62	5	0	1	1	1	4
7	Keith Tkachuk	LW	50	22	21	43	7	82	5	1	1	2	−4	4
27	Teppo Numminen	D	79	8	34	42	21	16	5	1	1	2	1	0
21	Jyrki Lumme	D	74	8	32	40	9	44	5	0	1	1	−2	2
10	Trevor Letowski	RW	82	19	20	39	2	20	5	1	1	2	1	4
22	Rick Tocchet‡	RW	64	12	17	29	−5	67	—	—	—	—	—	—
36	Juha Ylonen	C	76	6	23	29	−6	12	1	0	0	0	−1	0
18	Mika Alatalo	LW	82	10	17	27	−3	36	5	0	0	0	1	2
3	Keith Carney	D	82	4	20	24	11	87	5	0	0	0	−4	17
26	Mike Sullivan	C	79	5	10	15	−4	10	5	0	1	1	−1	0
12	Benoit Hogue†	C	27	3	10	13	−1	10	5	1	2	3	2	2
5	Deron Quint‡	D	50	3	7	10	0	22	—	—	—	—	—	—
24	Stan Neckar	D	66	2	8	10	1	36	5	0	0	0	0	0
4	Lyle Odelein†	D	16	1	7	8	1	19	5	0	0	0	−3	16
29	Louie DeBrusk	LW	61	4	3	7	1	78	3	0	0	0	0	0
33	J. J. Daigneault	D	53	1	6	7	−16	22	1	0	0	0	−1	0
23	Todd Gill‡	D	41	1	6	7	−10	30	—	—	—	—	—	—
20	Mikael Renberg†	RW	10	2	4	6	0	2	5	1	2	3	−2	4
15 (Note: Suchy wore number 63 in his first four games.)	Radoslav Suchy	D	60	0	6	6	2	16	5	0	1	1	3	0
30	Mikhail Shtalenkov‡	G	15	0	3	3		2	—	—	—	—	—	—
8	Daniel Briere	C	13	1	1	2	0	0	1	0	0	0	0	0
20	David Oliver	RW	9	1	0	1	0	2	—	—	—	—	—	—
1	Sean Burke†	G	35	0	0	0		10	5	0	0	0		0
42	Robert Esche	G	8	0	0	0		4	—	—	—	—	—	—
31	Bob Essensa	G	30	0	0	0		0	—	—	—	—	—	—
14	Tavis Hansen	RW	5	0	0	0	0	0	—	—	—	—	—	—
23	Chris Joseph†	D	9	0	0	0	−5	0	—	—	—	—	—	—
70	Kevin Sawyer	LW	3	0	0	0	1	12	—	—	—	—	—	—
64	Wyatt Smith	C	2	0	0	0	−2	0	—	—	—	—	—	—
62	Jean-Guy Trudel	LW	1	0	0	0	−1	0	—	—	—	—	—	—

=== Goaltending ===
- † = Joined team via a transaction (e.g., trade, waivers, signing) during the season. Stats reflect time with the Coyotes only.
- ‡ = Left team via a transaction (e.g., trade, waivers, release) during the season. Stats reflect time with the Coyotes only.

No.	Player	Regular season										Playoffs								
No.	Player	GP	W	L	T	SA	GA	GAA	SV%	SO	TOI	GP	W	L	SA	GA	GAA	SV%	SO	TOI
1	Sean Burke†	35	17	14	3	1022	88	2.55	.914	3	2074	5	1	4	167	16	3.24	.904	0	296
31	Bob Essensa	30	13	10	3	719	73	2.78	.898	1	1573	—	—	—	—	—	—	—	—	—
30	Mikhail Shtalenkov‡	15	7	6	2	370	36	2.39	.903	2	904	—	—	—	—	—	—	—	—	—
42	Robert Esche	8	2	5	0	215	23	3.38	.893	0	408	—	—	—	—	—	—	—	—	—

== Awards and records ==
=== Awards ===
Type	Award/honor	Recipient	Ref
League (in-season)	NHL All-Star Game selection	Teppo Numminen	
League (in-season)	NHL All-Star Game selection	Jeremy Roenick	
League (in-season)	NHL Player of the Month	Mikhail Shtalenkov (October)	
League (in-season)	NHL Player of the Week	Jeremy Roenick (November 29) (Note: Co-winner with Jose Theodore of the Montreal Canadiens.)	
League (in-season)	NHL Rookie of the Month	Trevor Letowski (January)	
Team	Hardest Working Player Award	Shane Doan	
Team	Leading Scorer Award	Jeremy Roenick	
Team	Man of the Year Award	Jeremy Roenick	
Team	Team MVP Award	Jeremy Roenick	
Team	Three-Star Award	Keith Tkachuk	

=== Milestones ===
Milestone	Player	Date	Ref
First game	Mika Alatalo	October 2, 1999	
First game	Radoslav Suchy	October 23, 1999	
First game	Jean-Guy Trudel	March 24, 2000	
First game	Wyatt Smith	April 7, 2000	
1,000th game played	Rick Tocchet	October 26, 1999	

== Transactions ==
=== Trades ===
September 11, 1999	To Chicago Blackhawks Cash	To Phoenix Coyotes Craig Mills
November 19, 1999	To Florida Panthers Mikhail Shtalenkov; 4th round pick in 2000 (Chris Eade)	To Phoenix Coyotes Sean Burke; 5th round pick in 2000 (Nate Kiser)
November 30, 1999	To Edmonton Oilers Rob Murray	To Phoenix Coyotes Eric Houde
March 7, 2000	To New Jersey Devils Deron Quint; 3rd round pick in 2001 (Beat Schiess-Forster)	To Phoenix Coyotes Lyle Odelein
March 8, 2000	To Philadelphia Flyers Rick Tocchet	To Phoenix Coyotes Mikael Renberg
March 13, 2000	To Detroit Red Wings Todd Gill	To Phoenix Coyotes Philippe Audet

=== Waivers ===
March 14, 2000	From Vancouver Canucks Chris Joseph

=== Free agents ===
Player	Former team
Todd Gill	Detroit Red Wings
Francois Leroux	Colorado Avalanche
Jean-Guy Trudel	Undrafted Free Agent
Steven King	Philadelphia Flyers
David Oliver	Ottawa Senators
Eric Healey	Calgary Flames
Ryan Huska	New York Islanders
Shayne Toporowski	St. Louis Blues
Bob Essensa	Edmonton Oilers
Benoit Hogue	Dallas Stars

Player	New team
Jamie Huscroft	Washington Capitals
Jeff Christian	Chicago Blackhawks
Darin Kimble	Peoria Rivermen (ECHL)
Stephen Leach	Pittsburgh Penguins
Bob Corkum	Los Angeles Kings
Gerald Diduck	Toronto Maple Leafs

== Draft picks ==
Phoenix's draft picks at the 1999 NHL entry draft held at the FleetCenter in Boston, Massachusetts.

Round	#	Player	Nationality	College/Junior/Club team (League)
1	15	Scott Kelman	Canada	Seattle Thunderbirds (WHL)
1	19	Kirill Safronov	Russia	SKA St. Petersburg (Russia)
2	53	Brad Ralph	Canada	Oshawa Generals (OHL)
3	71	Jason Jaspers	Canada	Sudbury Wolves (OHL)
4	116	Ryan Lauzon	Canada	Hull Olympiques (QMJHL)
4	123	Preston Mizzi	Canada	Peterborough Petes (OHL)
6	168	Erik Lewerstrom	Sweden	Grums IK (Sweden)
8	234	Goran Bezina	Switzerland	HC Fribourg-Gotteron (Switzerland)
9	262	Alexei Litvinenko	Kazakhstan	Torpedo Ust-Kamenogorsk (Kazakhstan)

== See also ==
- 1999–2000 NHL season
