= 1999–2000 Mighty Ducks of Anaheim season =

NHL team season

1999–2000 Mighty Ducks of Anaheim
- Division: 5th Pacific
- Conference: 9th Western
- 1999–2000 record: 34–33–12–3
- Home record: 19–13–7–2
- Road record: 15–20–5–1
- Goals for: 217
- Goals against: 227

Team information
- General manager: Pierre Gauthier
- Coach: Craig Hartsburg
- Captain: Paul Kariya
- Alternate captains: Kevin Haller; Teemu Selanne
- Arena: Arrowhead Pond of Anaheim
- Average attendance: 14,460
- Minor league affiliate: Cincinnati Mighty Ducks

Team leaders
- Goals: Paul Kariya (42)
- Assists: Teemu Selanne (52)
- Points: Paul Kariya (86)
- Penalty minutes: Stu Grimson (116)
- Plus/minus: Paul Kariya (+22)
- Wins: Guy Hebert (28)
- Goals against average: Guy Hebert (2.51)

The 1999–2000 Mighty Ducks of Anaheim season was the team's seventh season. The Ducks failed to qualify for the playoffs despite recording 83 points again.

== Off-season ==
The Ducks made a few changes during the summer, with the focus on improving their scoring depth much like last season.

Ted Donato was acquired from the Ottawa Senators with Antti-Jussi Niemi in exchange for goalie Patrick Lalime on June 18, 1999. The Mighty Ducks acquired Oleg Tverdovsky from the Phoenix Coyotes in exchange for Travis Green on June 26, 1999, in order to give the team more scoring from the blue line since Fredrik Olausson was the only point producing defence man last season. Defense man Mike Crowley would not make the roster with the Ducks although scoring 4 goals and 9 points in 28 games over the last two seasons, being sent to the Long Beach Ice Dogs of the IHL.

Rookies Mike Leclerc and Niclas Havelid earned roster spots. Vitaly Vishnevskiy would be their first choice to get a call up from Cincinnati in case of needing a defense man.

On September 27, five days before the season started the Ducks acquired prospect Ladislav Kohn from the Atlanta Thrashers in exchange for 2000 8th round Draft pick.

== Regular season ==
The season went down very much like the last one. The Mighty Ducks lost their first two games getting shut out both times but won their next two scoring eight goals. Anaheim made an early deal with the Islanders sending Ted Drury to Long Island in exchange for Tony Hrkac, who had won the Stanley Cup with Dallas the previous season. They played very consistently until December 26, 1999, going 18–13–4–1, winning four games in a row in mid-December. What seemed like the winning streak they needed quickly turned on its head becoming their longest winless streak – going 0–6–1 and dropping below the .500 mark for the first time. Anaheim stayed below that mark until January 26, 2000 when rumors surfaced about trading Selanne to give the Ducks more depth in order to make the playoffs, which looked questionable at that point.

The Ducks did boost their lineup by acquiring Kip Miller from Pittsburgh on January 29. Ironically, the Ducks had a five-game unbeaten streak which began in Pittsburgh and going 7–3–4 since Kip Miller's acquisition by February 29. In early March Anaheim struggled to keep up with Edmonton and San Jose, going 1–3–2-1 and winless the last four games during that stretch until March 15. The Ducks then again made a playoff push, winning the next three games, but going 3–4–0–1 after that streak in their last eight games, thus missing the postseason by four points. Since the Mighty Ducks never were out of the playoff picture fans and experts criticized General Manager Pierre Gauthier's decision not to obtain a player with some scoring touch (Sergei Krivokrasov and Brendan Morrison were dealt at the trading deadline). Late acquisitions Ed Ward and Jorgen Jonsson had no impact, each scoring only one goal though Ward brought some physical play with him, which was needed after the Ducks waived Jim McKenzie in mid-January.

Anaheim's biggest problem was their penalty killing: the Mighty Ducks struggled often short-handed during the regular season, as they had the lowest penalty-kill percentage in the NHL at 79.05%. The defense ranked seventh in the West, but the team's poor penalty kill resulted in 21 more goals allowed than the previous season, which cost them the playoffs. Offensively, their defensemen scored 43 goals compared to 25 goals in 1998–99, led by Olausson and Tverdovsky for a combined 30 goals. Both goalies had another very solid season though their save percentage was down compared to the previous year. Hebert recorded the second-best GAA of his career; this was also Hebert's fifth straight season with three or more shutouts. Their offense relied on their first line, again combining for 94 goals (109 goals last season) but saw more secondary scoring from other players as Cullen, Aalto and Nielsen improved their goal and point totals while Mike Leclerc had a solid rookie season with 19 points. Marty McInnis missed twenty games, which was a factor. The Ducks' power play was good but nowhere near the dominance of last season, ranking 14th with a percentage of 16.57%.

=== Final standings ===
Pacific Division
No.	CR		GP	W	L	T	OTL	GF	GA	Pts
1	2	**Dallas Stars**	82	43	23	10	6	211	184	102
2	5	**Los Angeles Kings**	82	39	27	12	4	245	228	94
3	6	**Phoenix Coyotes**	82	39	31	8	4	232	228	90
4	8	**San Jose Sharks**	82	35	30	10	7	225	214	87
5	9	Mighty Ducks of Anaheim	82	34	33	12	3	217	227	83

Note: CR = Conference rank; GP = Games played; W = Wins; L = Losses; T = Ties; OTL = Overtime loss; GF = Goals for; GA = Goals against; PIM = Penalties in minutes; Pts = Points
Bolded teams qualified for the playoffs.

Western Conference
R		Div	GP	W	L	T	OTL	GF	GA	Pts
**1**	**p – St. Louis Blues**	**CEN**	**82**	**51**	**19**	**11**	**1**	**248**	**165**	**114**
**2**	**y – Dallas Stars**	**PAC**	**82**	**43**	**23**	**10**	**6**	**211**	**184**	**102**
**3**	**y – Colorado Avalanche**	**NW**	**82**	**42**	**28**	**11**	**1**	**233**	**201**	**96**
**4**	**Detroit Red Wings**	**CEN**	**82**	**48**	**22**	**10**	**2**	**278**	**210**	**108**
**5**	**Los Angeles Kings**	**PAC**	**82**	**39**	**27**	**12**	**4**	**245**	**228**	**94**
**6**	**Phoenix Coyotes**	**PAC**	**82**	**39**	**31**	**8**	**4**	**232**	**228**	**90**
**7**	**Edmonton Oilers**	**NW**	**82**	**32**	**26**	**16**	**8**	**226**	**212**	**88**
**8**	**San Jose Sharks**	**PAC**	**82**	**35**	**30**	**10**	**7**	**225**	**214**	**87**
8.5
9	Mighty Ducks of Anaheim	PAC	82	34	33	12	3	217	227	83
10	Vancouver Canucks	NW	82	30	29	15	8	227	237	83
11	Chicago Blackhawks	CEN	82	33	37	10	2	242	245	78
12	Calgary Flames	NW	82	31	36	10	5	211	256	77
13	Nashville Predators	CEN	82	28	40	7	7	199	240	70

Divisions: CEN – Central, PAC – Pacific, NW – Northwest

bold – Qualified for playoffs; p – Won Presidents' Trophy; y – Won division

== Schedule and results ==
1999–2000 regular season
October: 6–5–1–1 (home: 4–2–0–0; road: 2–3–1–1)

Game	Date	Score	Opponent	Record	Recap
1	October 2, 1999	0–2	@ Dallas Stars (1999–2000)	0–1–0–0	L
2	October 5, 1999	0–4	@ Phoenix Coyotes (1999–2000)	0–2–0–0	L
3	October 8, 1999	3–0	Dallas Stars (1999–2000)	1–2–0–0	W
4	October 11, 1999	5–3	San Jose Sharks (1999–2000)	2–2–0–0	W
5	October 13, 1999	2–3	@ New Jersey Devils (1999–2000)	2–3–0–0	L
6	October 15, 1999	3–2	@ Tampa Bay Lightning (1999–2000)	3–3–0–0	W
7	October 16, 1999	2–3 OT	@ Florida Panthers (1999–2000)	3–3–0–1	OTL
8	October 19, 1999	7–1	@ Washington Capitals (1999–2000)	4–3–0–1	W
9	October 21, 1999	5–5 OT	@ Chicago Blackhawks (1999–2000)	4–3–1–1	T
10	October 24, 1999	2–3	Boston Bruins (1999–2000)	4–4–1–1	L
11	October 27, 1999	2–1 OT	Pittsburgh Penguins (1999–2000)	5–4–1–1	W
12	October 29, 1999	5–2	Washington Capitals (1999–2000)	6–4–1–1	W
13	October 31, 1999	0–3	Phoenix Coyotes (1999–2000)	6–5–1–1	L

November: 6–5–1–0 (home: 3–2–1–0; road: 3–3–0–0)

Game	Date	Score	Opponent	Record	Recap
14	November 3, 1999	3–3 OT	Philadelphia Flyers (1999–2000)	6–5–2–1	T
15	November 7, 1999	3–1	Edmonton Oilers (1999–2000)	7–5–2–1	W
16	November 9, 1999	2–0	@ Toronto Maple Leafs (1999–2000)	8–5–2–1	W
17	November 11, 1999	1–2	@ Montreal Canadiens (1999–2000)	8–6–2–1	L
18	November 13, 1999	2–4	@ Ottawa Senators (1999–2000)	8–7–2–1	L
19	November 15, 1999	3–6	@ Detroit Red Wings (1999–2000)	8–8–2–1	L
20	November 17, 1999	2–1	Calgary Flames (1999–2000)	9–8–2–1	W
21	November 19, 1999	4–2	Chicago Blackhawks (1999–2000)	10–8–2–1	W
22	November 22, 1999	1–2	Montreal Canadiens (1999–2000)	10–9–2–1	L
23	November 24, 1999	1–2	New Jersey Devils (1999–2000)	10–10–2–1	L
24	November 26, 1999	4–2	@ Dallas Stars (1999–2000)	11–10–2–1	W
25	November 27, 1999	4–3	@ Nashville Predators (1999–2000)	12–10–2–1	W

December: 6–6–2–0 (home: 3–3–2–0; road: 3–3–0–0)

Game	Date	Score	Opponent	Record	Recap
26	December 1, 1999	2–4	Tampa Bay Lightning (1999–2000)	12–11–2–1	L
27	December 3, 1999	1–1 OT	Los Angeles Kings (1999–2000)	12–11–3–1	T
28	December 4, 1999	2–1	@ Phoenix Coyotes (1999–2000)	13–11–3–1	W
29	December 8, 1999	2–2 OT	Vancouver Canucks (1999–2000)	13–11–4–1	T
30	December 10, 1999	1–2	Colorado Avalanche (1999–2000)	13–12–4–1	L
31	December 12, 1999	4–1	Atlanta Thrashers (1999–2000)	14–12–4–1	W
32	December 15, 1999	4–2	@ Colorado Avalanche (1999–2000)	15–12–4–1	W
33	December 17, 1999	2–0	Chicago Blackhawks (1999–2000)	16–12–4–1	W
34	December 19, 1999	3–1	Detroit Red Wings (1999–2000)	17–12–4–1	W
35	December 22, 1999	2–8	Phoenix Coyotes (1999–2000)	17–13–4–1	L
36	December 26, 1999	1–0	@ San Jose Sharks (1999–2000)	18–13–4–1	W
37	December 27, 1999	1–4	@ Edmonton Oilers (1999–2000)	18–14–4–1	L
38	December 29, 1999	1–3	@ Calgary Flames (1999–2000)	18–15–4–1	L
39	December 31, 1999	4–5	@ Dallas Stars (1999–2000)	18–16–4–1	L

January: 4–7–2–0 (home: 2–4–1–0; road: 2–3–1–0)

Game	Date	Score	Opponent	Record	Recap
40	January 5, 2000	1–5	Florida Panthers (1999–2000)	18–17–4–1	L
41	January 7, 2000	4–4 OT	@ Carolina Hurricanes (1999–2000)	18–17–5–1	T
42	January 8, 2000	3–5	@ Detroit Red Wings (1999–2000)	18–18–5–1	L
43	January 12, 2000	0–2	Ottawa Senators (1999–2000)	18–19–5–1	L
44	January 14, 2000	3–1	St. Louis Blues (1999–2000)	19–19–5–1	W
45	January 15, 2000	2–4	@ Phoenix Coyotes (1999–2000)	19–20–5–1	L
46	January 17, 2000	0–5	Buffalo Sabres (1999–2000)	19–21–5–1	L
47	January 19, 2000	3–1	Dallas Stars (1999–2000)	20–21–5–1	W
48	January 21, 2000	3–3 OT	Colorado Avalanche (1999–2000)	20–21–6–1	T
49	January 22, 2000	3–4	@ San Jose Sharks (1999–2000)	20–22–6–1	L
50	January 26, 2000	2–4	New York Islanders (1999–2000)	20–23–6–1	L
51	January 29, 2000	7–1	@ Pittsburgh Penguins (1999–2000)	21–23–6–1	W
52	January 31, 2000	4–2	@ Boston Bruins (1999–2000)	22–23–6–1	W

February: 5–3–4–0 (home: 2–2–2–0; road: 3–1–2–0)

Game	Date	Score	Opponent	Record	Recap
53	February 1, 2000	2–2 OT	@ Buffalo Sabres (1999–2000)	22–23–7–1	T
54	February 3, 2000	3–3 OT	@ Philadelphia Flyers (1999–2000)	22–23–8–1	T
55	February 8, 2000	5–3	@ Los Angeles Kings (1999–2000)	23–23–8–1	W
56	February 9, 2000	3–5	Dallas Stars (1999–2000)	23–24–8–1	L
57	February 12, 2000	3–6	@ St. Louis Blues (1999–2000)	23–25–8–1	L
58	February 14, 2000	4–3	@ Chicago Blackhawks (1999–2000)	24–25–8–1	W
59	February 16, 2000	6–5 OT	Calgary Flames (1999–2000)	25–25–8–1	W
60	February 18, 2000	4–4 OT	San Jose Sharks (1999–2000)	25–25–9–1	T
61	February 21, 2000	2–4	St. Louis Blues (1999–2000)	25–26–9–1	L
62	February 23, 2000	4–4 OT	Vancouver Canucks (1999–2000)	25–26–10–1	T
63	February 27, 2000	3–2	Edmonton Oilers (1999–2000)	26–26–10–1	W
64	February 29, 2000	4–2	@ San Jose Sharks (1999–2000)	27–26–10–1	W

March: 5–5–2–1 (home: 4–0–1–1; road: 1–5–1–0)

Game	Date	Score	Opponent	Record	Recap
65	March 2, 2000	1–3	@ Vancouver Canucks (1999–2000)	27–27–10–1	L
66	March 3, 2000	1–4	@ Calgary Flames (1999–2000)	27–28–10–1	L
67	March 5, 2000	1–0	Nashville Predators (1999–2000)	28–28–10–1	W
68	March 8, 2000	3–4 OT	New York Rangers (1999–2000)	28–28–10–2	OTL
69	March 11, 2000	1–1 OT	@ St. Louis Blues (1999–2000)	28–28–11–2	T
70	March 14, 2000	2–4	@ Colorado Avalanche (1999–2000)	28–29–11–2	L
71	March 15, 2000	2–2 OT	Los Angeles Kings (1999–2000)	28–29–12–2	T
72	March 17, 2000	4–2	San Jose Sharks (1999–2000)	29–29–12–2	W
73	March 19, 2000	3–1	Detroit Red Wings (1999–2000)	30–29–12–2	W
74	March 21, 2000	5–2	@ Los Angeles Kings (1999–2000)	31–29–12–2	W
75	March 22, 2000	1–2	@ Edmonton Oilers (1999–2000)	31–30–12–2	L
76	March 24, 2000	1–8	@ Vancouver Canucks (1999–2000)	31–31–12–2	L
77	March 26, 2000	4–3 OT	Phoenix Coyotes (1999–2000)	32–31–12–2	W

April: 2–2–0–1 (home: 1–0–0–1; road: 1–2–0–0)

Game	Date	Score	Opponent	Record	Recap
78	April 1, 2000	1–2	@ Los Angeles Kings (1999–2000)	32–32–12–2	L
79	April 3, 2000	3–1	Nashville Predators (1999–2000)	33–32–12–2	W
80	April 5, 2000	2–5	@ Chicago Blackhawks (1999–2000)	33–33–12–2	L
81	April 7, 2000	5–1	@ Nashville Predators (1999–2000)	34–33–12–2	W
82	April 9, 2000	3–4 OT	Los Angeles Kings (1999–2000)	34–33–12–3	OTL

Legend: W Win (2 points) L Loss (0 points) T Tie (1 point) OTL Overtime loss (1 point)

== Player statistics ==
=== Scoring ===
- Position abbreviations: C = Center; D = Defense; G = Goaltender; LW = Left wing; RW = Right wing
- † = Joined team via a transaction (e.g., trade, waivers, signing) during the season. Stats reflect time with the Mighty Ducks only.
- ‡ = Left team via a transaction (e.g., trade, waivers, release) during the season. Stats reflect time with the Mighty Ducks only.

No.	Player	Pos	Regular season					
No.	Player	Pos	GP	G	A	Pts	+/-	PIM
9	Paul Kariya	LW	74	42	44	86	22	24
8	Teemu Selanne	RW	79	33	52	85	6	12
20	Steve Rucchin	C	71	19	38	57	9	16
10	Oleg Tverdovsky	D	82	15	36	51	5	30
17	Matt Cullen	C	80	13	26	39	5	24
2	Fredrik Olausson	D	70	15	19	34	−13	28
21	Ted Donato	LW	81	11	19	30	−3	26
16	Marty McInnis	RW	62	10	18	28	−4	26
11	Kip Miller†	C	30	6	17	23	1	4
29	Ladislav Kohn	RW	77	5	16	21	−17	27
12	Mike Leclerc	LW	69	8	11	19	−15	70
19	Jeff Nielsen	RW	79	8	10	18	4	14
14	Antti Aalto	C	63	7	11	18	−13	26
7	Pavel Trnka	D	57	2	15	17	12	34
15	Tony Hrkac†	C	60	4	7	11	−2	8
24	Ruslan Salei	D	71	5	5	10	3	94
28	Niclas Havelid	D	50	2	7	9	0	20
5	Kevin Haller	D	67	3	5	8	−8	61
33	Jim McKenzie‡	LW	31	3	3	6	−5	48
27	Pascal Trepanier	D	37	0	4	4	2	54
32	Stu Grimson	LW	50	1	2	3	0	116
22	Jorgen Jonsson†	LW	13	1	2	3	−2	0
23	Jason Marshall	D	55	0	3	3	−10	88
18	Ted Drury‡	C	11	1	1	2	−1	6
6	Vitaly Vishnevskiy	D	31	1	1	2	0	26
31	Guy Hebert	G	68	0	2	2		2
22	Johan Davidsson‡	C	5	1	0	1	0	2
33	Ed Ward†	RW	8	1	0	1	−2	15
18	Maxim Balmochnykh	LW	6	0	1	1	2	2
25	Frank Banham	RW	3	0	0	0	0	2
30	Dominic Roussel	G	20	0	0	0		6
26	Jeremy Stevenson	LW	3	0	0	0	−1	7

=== Goaltending ===
No.	Player	Regular season									
No.	Player	GP	W	L	T	SA	GA	GAA	SV%	SO	TOI
31	Guy Hebert	68	28	31	9	1805	166	2.51	.908	4	3976
30	Dominic Roussel	20	6	5	3	445	52	3.16	.883	1	988

== Awards and records ==
=== Awards ===
Type	Award/honor	Recipient	Ref
League (annual)	NHL Second All-Star Team	Paul Kariya (Left wing)	
League (in-season)	NHL All-Star Game selection	Paul Kariya (Note: Kariya and Selanne were voted to the starting lineup.)	
League (in-season)	NHL All-Star Game selection	Teemu Selanne	

=== Milestones ===
Milestone	Player	Date	Ref
First game	Niclas Havelid	October 2, 1999	
First game	Maxim Balmochnykh	January 19, 2000	
First game	Vitali Vishnevski	January 19, 2000	
25th shutout	Guy Hebert	December 17, 1999	

== Transactions ==
Acquired Tony Hrkac and Dean Malkoc from the New York Islanders for Ted Drury on October 29, 1999

Waived Jim McKenzie, claimed off waivers by the Washington Capitals on January 20, 2000

Acquired Kip Miller from the Pittsburgh Penguins for a 2000 9th round Draft pick on January 29, 2000

Acquired Jorgen Jonson from the New York Islanders for Johan Davidson on March 11, 2000

Acquired Ed Ward from the Atlanta Thrashers for a 2001 7th round Draft pick on March 14, 2000

Traded Dan Trebil to the Pittsburgh Penguins for a 2000 5th round Draft pick on March 14, 2000

Acquired Corey Hirsch from the Nashville Predators for future considerations on March 14, 2000

Acquired a 2000 2nd round draft pick (Jonas Ronnqvist) for Trent Hunter from the New York Islanders on May 23, 2000

Acquired a 2001 4th draft pick for Espen Knutsen from the Columbus Blue Jackets on May 25, 2000

Acquired a 2000 4th draft pick for the rights to Stephen Peat from the Washington Capitals on June 1, 2000

Acquired Jean-Sebastien Giguere for a 2000 2nd round draft pick from the Calgary Flames on June 10, 2000

== Draft picks ==
Anaheim's draft picks at the 1999 NHL entry draft held at the FleetCenter in Boston, Massachusetts.

Round	#	Player	Nationality	College/Junior/Club team (League)
2	44	Jordan Leopold	United States	University of Minnesota (NCAA)
3	83	Niclas Havelid	Sweden	Malmo IF (Sweden)
4	105	Alexander Chagodayev	Russia	CSKA Moscow (Russia)
5	141	Maxim Rybin	Russia	Spartak Moscow (Russia)
6	173	Jan Sandstrom	Sweden	AIK IF (Sweden)
8	230	Petr Tenkrat	Czech Republic	Poldi Kladno (Czech Republic)
9	258	Brian Gornick	United States	Air Force Academy (NCAA)

== Farm teams ==
Cincinnati Mighty Ducks

== See also ==
- 1999–2000 NHL season
