= 1999–2000 Calgary Flames season =

NHL team season

1999–2000 Calgary Flames
- Division: 4th Northwest
- Conference: 12th Western
- 1999–2000 record: 31–41–10–5
- Home record: 20–14–6–1
- Road record: 11–22–4–4
- Goals for: 211
- Goals against: 256

Team information
- General manager: Al Coates
- Coach: Brian Sutter
- Captain: Steve Smith
- Arena: Canadian Airlines Saddledome
- Average attendance: 14,946
- Minor league affiliates: Saint John Flames; Johnstown Chiefs

Team leaders
- Goals: Valeri Bure (35)
- Assists: Phil Housley (44)
- Points: Valeri Bure (75)
- Penalty minutes: Wade Belak (122)
- Plus/minus: Bobby Dollas (+4)
- Wins: Fred Brathwaite (25)
- Goals against average: Fred Brathwaite (2.75)

The 1999–2000 Calgary Flames season was the 20th National Hockey League season in Calgary. It featured a very young line-up, as befitted the "Young Guns" slogan the team was using at the time. Twenty-nine-year-old Steve Dubinsky was the oldest forward on the team when the season started. The Flames were pitting their hopes for ending their playoff drought on the off-season acquisition of 37-year-old goaltender Grant Fuhr.

The season started with young sniper Jarome Iginla holding out, as he was unable to come to a contract agreement with General Manager Al Coates. Despite lacking a contract, Iginla attended training camp, however he missed the first two games of the season before a deal could be reached.

Calgary Flames 20th anniversary logo

The Flames youth led to an inconsistent team, often bouncing between long winning and losing streaks. It took the Flames 20 games to win their first game in regulation time, however the team would break an NHL record on January 21, 2000 by winning their eighth overtime game. At the end of the season the Flames set an NHL record by winning ten games in overtime. The Flames also struggled with injuries all season, losing 479 man-games to injury, and using a total of 45 players over the course of 1999–2000. As a result, the Flames would finish last in the Northwest Division, missing the playoffs for the fourth straight year.

Following the season, the Flames cleaned house, firing Coates, and announcing they would not be offering head coach Brian Sutter and assistant coach Rich Preston new contracts.

On the bright side for the Flames, two players were selected to participate in the 2000 NHL All Star Game, as Phil Housley represented the North American team, while Valeri Bure represented the European team.

Rookie defenceman Robyn Regehr became the youngest nominee for the Bill Masterton Memorial Trophy in NHL history after he survived a serious car accident over the summer of 1999 that left him with two broken legs. Regehr would play 57 games for the Flames, but would not win the award.

Prior to the season, the Flames lost right winger Ed Ward to the Atlanta Thrashers in the 1999 NHL expansion draft. The Flames also dealt Andreas Karlsson to the Thrashers in exchange for promises not to select certain unprotected players.

== Regular season ==
=== Season standings ===
Northwest Division
No.	CR		GP	W	L	T	OTL	GF	GA	Pts
1	3	**Colorado Avalanche**	82	42	28	11	1	233	201	96
2	7	**Edmonton Oilers**	82	32	26	16	8	226	212	88
3	10	Vancouver Canucks	82	30	29	15	8	227	237	83
4	12	Calgary Flames	82	31	36	10	5	211	256	77

Note: CR = Conference rank; GP = Games played; W = Wins; L = Losses; T = Ties; OTL = Overtime loss; GF = Goals for; GA = Goals against; PIM = Penalties in minutes; Pts = Points
Bolded teams qualified for the playoffs.

Western Conference
R		Div	GP	W	L	T	OTL	GF	GA	Pts
**1**	**p – St. Louis Blues**	**CEN**	**82**	**51**	**19**	**11**	**1**	**248**	**165**	**114**
**2**	**y – Dallas Stars**	**PAC**	**82**	**43**	**23**	**10**	**6**	**211**	**184**	**102**
**3**	**y – Colorado Avalanche**	**NW**	**82**	**42**	**28**	**11**	**1**	**233**	**201**	**96**
**4**	**Detroit Red Wings**	**CEN**	**82**	**48**	**22**	**10**	**2**	**278**	**210**	**108**
**5**	**Los Angeles Kings**	**PAC**	**82**	**39**	**27**	**12**	**4**	**245**	**228**	**94**
**6**	**Phoenix Coyotes**	**PAC**	**82**	**39**	**31**	**8**	**4**	**232**	**228**	**90**
**7**	**Edmonton Oilers**	**NW**	**82**	**32**	**26**	**16**	**8**	**226**	**212**	**88**
**8**	**San Jose Sharks**	**PAC**	**82**	**35**	**30**	**10**	**7**	**225**	**214**	**87**
8.5
9	Mighty Ducks of Anaheim	PAC	82	34	33	12	3	217	227	83
10	Vancouver Canucks	NW	82	30	29	15	8	227	237	83
11	Chicago Blackhawks	CEN	82	33	37	10	2	242	245	78
12	Calgary Flames	NW	82	31	36	10	5	211	256	77
13	Nashville Predators	CEN	82	28	40	7	7	199	240	70

Divisions: CEN – Central, PAC – Pacific, NW – Northwest

bold – Qualified for playoffs; p – Won Presidents' Trophy; y – Won division

== Schedule and results ==
1999–2000 regular season
October: 3–8–2–0 (home: 0–3–2–0; road: 3–5–0–0)

Game	Date	Visitor	Score	Home	OT	Record	Pts	Recap
1	October 2	Calgary	3 – 5	San Jose		0–1–0–0	0	L
2	October 6	St. Louis	4 – 1	Calgary		0–2–0–0	0	L
3	October 8	Montreal	4 – 1	Calgary		0–3–0–0	0	L
4	October 11	Carolina	3 – 3	Calgary	OT	0–3–1–0	1	T
5	October 13	Calgary	4 – 3	Vancouver	OT	1–3–1–0	3	W
6	October 15	Los Angeles	4 – 1	Calgary		1–4–1–0	3	L
7	October 16	Vancouver	4 – 4	Calgary	OT	1–4–2–0	4	T
8	October 19	Calgary	1 – 7	St. Louis		1–5–2–0	4	L
9	October 22	Calgary	3 – 2	Florida	OT	2–5–2–0	6	W
10	October 23	Calgary	1 – 2	Tampa Bay		2–6–2–0	6	L
11	October 26	Calgary	1 – 2	Atlanta		2–7–2–0	6	L
12	October 28	Calgary	4 – 3	Ottawa	OT	3–7–2–0	8	W
13	October 30	Calgary	1 – 2	Toronto		3–8–2–0	8	L

November: 5–6–0–0 (home: 5–2–0–0; road: 0–4–0–0)

Game	Date	Visitor	Score	Home	OT	Record	Pts	Recap
14	November 3	Nashville	4 – 5	Calgary	OT	4–8–2–0	10	W
15	November 6	Florida	6 – 3	Calgary		4–9–2–0	10	L
16	November 10	San Jose	3 – 4	Calgary	OT	5–9–2–0	12	W
17	November 13	Colorado	5 – 2	Calgary		5–10–2–0	12	L
18	November 16	Calgary	1 – 2	Phoenix		5–11–2–0	12	L
19	November 17	Calgary	1 – 2	Anaheim		5–12–2–0	12	L
20	November 19	Detroit	1 – 3	Calgary		6–12–2–0	14	W
21	November 23	NY Islanders	2 – 3	Calgary		7–12–2–0	16	W
22	November 25	Chicago	1 – 2	Calgary	OT	8–12–2–0	18	W
23	November 27	Calgary	1 – 7	Colorado		8–13–2–0	18	L
24	November 30	Calgary	3 – 4	Carolina		8–14–2–0	18	L

December: 8–2–3–1 (home: 4–1–1–0; road: 4–1–2–1)

Game	Date	Visitor	Score	Home	OT	Record	Pts	Recap
25	December 2	Calgary	5 – 0	NY Islanders		9–14–2–0	20	W
26	December 4	Calgary	4 – 2	New Jersey		10–14–2–0	22	W
27	December 6	Calgary	2 – 3	NY Rangers	OT	10–14–2–1	23	OTL
28	December 7	Calgary	3 – 3	Montreal	OT	10–14–3–1	24	T
29	December 10	Vancouver	2 – 3	Calgary		11–14–3–1	26	W
30	December 12	Calgary	2 – 1	Chicago		12–14–3–1	28	W
31	December 14	Calgary	1 – 1	St. Louis	OT	12–14–4–1	29	T
32	December 15	Calgary	1 – 5	Dallas		12–15–4–1	29	L
33	December 18	Ottawa	1 – 2	Calgary		13–15–4–1	31	W
34	December 21	Dallas	0 – 0	Calgary	OT	13–15–5–1	32	T
35	December 23	Edmonton	1 – 2	Calgary		14–15–5–1	34	W
36	December 26	Calgary	2 – 0	Vancouver		15–15–5–1	36	W
37	December 27	Philadelphia	5 – 1	Calgary		15–16–5–1	36	L
38	December 29	Anaheim	1 – 3	Calgary		16–16–5–1	38	W

January: 7–6–0–0 (home: 6–0–0–0; road: 1–6–0–0)

Game	Date	Visitor	Score	Home	OT	Record	Pts	Recap
39	January 2	Vancouver	2 – 4	Calgary		17–16–5–1	40	W
40	January 5	Calgary	0 – 4	Colorado		17–17–5–1	40	L
41	January 6	Calgary	2 – 5	Chicago		17–18–5–1	40	L
42	January 8	Tampa Bay	2 – 3	Calgary	OT	18–18–5–1	42	W
43	January 12	Dallas	1 – 2	Calgary		19–18–5–1	44	W
44	January 15	Toronto	0 – 4	Calgary		20–18–5–1	46	W
45	January 18	Detroit	1 – 6	Calgary		21–18–5–1	48	W
46	January 19	Calgary	0 – 7	Edmonton		21–19–5–1	48	L
47	January 21	Nashville	4 – 5	Calgary	OT	22–19–5–1	50	W
48	January 24	Calgary	4 – 3	Boston	OT	23–19–5–1	52	W
49	January 26	Calgary	1 – 2	Washington		23–20–5–1	52	L
50	January 28	Calgary	1 – 4	Detroit		23–21–5–1	52	L
51	January 29	Calgary	1 – 3	Nashville		23–22–5–1	52	L

February: 3–3–2–4 (home: 2–1–2–1; road: 1–2–0–3)

Game	Date	Visitor	Score	Home	OT	Record	Pts	Recap
52	February 1	St. Louis	5 – 4	Calgary	OT	23–22–5–2	53	OTL
53	February 3	Chicago	5 – 5	Calgary	OT	23–22–6–2	54	T
54	February 9	Calgary	3 – 4	Vancouver	OT	23–22–6–3	55	OTL
55	February 10	Calgary	2 – 3	Colorado		23–23–6–3	55	L
56	February 12	Calgary	3 – 4	Phoenix		23–24–6–3	55	L
57	February 14	Calgary	3 – 4	Los Angeles	OT	23–24–6–4	56	OTL
58	February 16	Calgary	5 – 6	Anaheim	OT	23–24–6–5	57	OTL
59	February 18	Edmonton	2 – 4	Calgary		24–24–6–5	59	W
60	February 19	Calgary	3 – 2	Edmonton	OT	25–24–6–5	61	W
61	February 23	Los Angeles	7 – 2	Calgary		25–25–6–5	61	L
62	February 25	Phoenix	3 – 3	Calgary	OT	25–25–7–5	62	T
63	February 26	Atlanta	2 – 5	Calgary		26–25–7–5	64	W

March: 4–8–2–0 (home: 2–5–1–0; road: 2–3–1–0)

Game	Date	Visitor	Score	Home	OT	Record	Pts	Recap
64	March 1	Pittsburgh	2 – 8	Calgary		27–25–7–5	66	W
65	March 3	Anaheim	1 – 4	Calgary		28–25–7–5	68	W
66	March 5	New Jersey	2 – 2	Calgary	OT	28–25–8–5	69	T
67	March 7	Colorado	8 – 3	Calgary		28–26–8–5	69	L
68	March 9	Toronto	6 – 2	Calgary		28–27–8–5	69	L
69	March 11	Calgary	1 – 3	Los Angeles		28–28–8–5	69	L
70	March 13	Calgary	3 – 5	San Jose		28–29–8–5	69	L
71	March 15	Ottawa	3 – 1	Calgary		28–30–8–5	69	L
72	March 18	Buffalo	5 – 1	Calgary		28–31–8–5	69	L
73	March 19	Calgary	3 – 2	Edmonton		29–31–8–5	71	W
74	March 22	Calgary	2 – 2	Detroit	OT	29–31–9–5	72	T
75	March 23	Calgary	2 – 4	Buffalo		29–32–9–5	72	L
76	March 25	Calgary	2 – 1	Nashville		30–32–9–5	74	W
77	March 31	Phoenix	3 – 1	Calgary		30–33–9–5	74	L

April: 1–3–1–0 (home: 1–2–0–0; road: 0–1–1–0)

Game	Date	Visitor	Score	Home	OT	Record	Pts	Recap
78	April 1	San Jose	0 – 3	Calgary		31–33–9–5	76	W
79	April 3	Calgary	2 – 2	Dallas	OT	31–33–10–5	77	T
80	April 5	Calgary	5 – 6	St. Louis		31–34–10–5	77	L
81	April 7	Colorado	3 – 1	Calgary		31–35–10–5	77	L
82	April 8	Edmonton	6 – 3	Calgary		31–36–10–5	77	L

Legend: W Win (2 points) L Loss (0 points) T Tie (1 point) OTL Overtime loss (1 point)

== Player statistics ==
=== Scoring ===
- Position abbreviations: C = Centre; D = Defence; G = Goaltender; LW = Left wing; RW = Right wing
- † = Joined team via a transaction (e.g., trade, waivers, signing) during the season. Stats reflect time with the Flames only.
- ‡ = Left team via a transaction (e.g., trade, waivers, release) during the season. Stats reflect time with the Flames only.

No.	Player	Pos	Regular season					
No.	Player	Pos	GP	G	A	Pts	+/-	PIM
8	Valeri Bure	RW	82	35	40	75	−7	50
12	Jarome Iginla	RW	77	29	34	63	0	26
6	Phil Housley	D	78	11	44	55	−12	24
27	Marc Savard	C	78	22	31	53	−2	56
53	Derek Morris	D	78	9	29	38	2	80
62	Andrei Nazarov	RW	76	10	22	32	3	78
11	Jeff Shantz	C	74	13	18	31	−13	30
24	Jason Wiemer	LW	64	11	11	22	−10	120
23	Clarke Wilm	C	78	10	12	22	−6	67
16	Cory Stillman	C	37	12	9	21	−9	12
22	Bill Lindsay	LW	80	8	12	20	−7	86
15	Martin St. Louis	C	56	3	15	18	−5	22
17	Hnat Domenichelli‡	C	32	5	9	14	0	12
20	Rene Corbet‡	LW	48	4	10	14	−7	60
28	Robyn Regehr	D	57	5	7	12	−2	46
25 (Note: Krivokrasov wore number 17 in his first game.)	Sergei Krivokrasov†	RW	12	1	10	11	2	4
5	Tommy Albelin	D	41	4	6	10	−3	12
4	Bobby Dollas†	D	49	3	7	10	4	28
21	Andreas Johansson†	LW	28	3	7	10	−3	14
2	Darryl Shannon†	D	27	1	8	9	−13	22
32	Cale Hulse‡	D	47	1	6	7	−11	47
38	Jeff Cowan	LW	13	4	1	5	2	16
7	Marc Bureau†	C	9	1	3	4	−3	2
55	Steve Smith	D	20	0	4	4	−13	42
37	Sergei Varlamov	RW	7	3	0	3	0	0
26 (Note: Begin wore number 7 in his first six games and number 33 in his next six games.)	Steve Begin	C	13	1	1	2	−3	18
3	Denis Gauthier	D	39	1	1	2	−4	50
33	Brad Werenka†	D	12	1	1	2	−2	21
29	Wade Belak	D	40	0	2	2	−4	122
26	Travis Brigley‡	LW	17	0	2	2	−6	4
39 (Note: Gratton wore number 37 in his first five games.)	Benoit Gratton	LW	10	0	2	2	1	10
50	Pavel Torgaev‡	LW	9	0	2	2	0	4
17 (Note: Clark wore number 7 through February 23.)	Chris Clark	RW	22	0	1	1	−3	14
18	Steve Dubinsky	C	23	0	1	1	−12	4
34	Stewart Malgunas†	D	4	0	1	1	1	2
19	Oleg Saprykin	C	4	0	1	1	−4	2
17	Jason Botterill†	LW	2	0	0	0	−4	0
40	Fred Brathwaite	G	61	0	0	0		4
36	Eric Charron	D	21	0	0	0	−3	37
15	Rico Fata	RW	2	0	0	0	−1	0
31	Grant Fuhr	G	23	0	0	0		2
47	Jean-Sebastien Giguere	G	7	0	0	0		2
25	Dave Roche	LW	2	0	0	0	−1	5
45 (Note: Scoville wore number 4 in his first game and number 2 in his next three games.)	Darrel Scoville	D	6	0	0	0	1	2
32	Lee Sorochan	D	1	0	0	0	0	0

=== Goaltending ===
No.	Player	Regular season									
No.	Player	GP	W	L	T	SA	GA	GAA	SV%	SO	TOI
40	Fred Brathwaite	61	25	25	7	1664	158	2.75	.905	5	3448
31	Grant Fuhr	23	5	13	2	536	77	3.83	.856	0	1205
47	Jean-Sebastien Giguere	7	1	3	1	175	15	2.72	.914	0	330

== Awards and records ==
=== Awards ===
Type	Award/honour	Recipient	Ref
League (in-season)	NHL All-Star Game selection	Valeri Bure	
League (in-season)	NHL All-Star Game selection	Phil Housley	
League (in-season)	NHL Player of the Month	Jarome Iginla (February)	
League (in-season)	NHL Player of the Week	Fred Brathwaite (December 27)	
Team	Molson Cup	Fred Brathwaite	
Team	Ralph T. Scurfield Humanitarian Award	Robyn Regehr	

=== Milestones ===
Milestone	Player	Date	Ref
First game	Oleg Saprykin	October 2, 1999	
First game	Robyn Regehr	October 28, 1999	
First game	Darrel Scoville	November 10, 1999	
First game	Chris Clark	January 12, 2000	
First game	Jeff Cowan	February 25, 2000	

== Transactions ==
The Flames were involved in the following transactions during the 1999–2000 season.

=== Trades ===
June 26, 1999	To Calgary Flames Marc Savard; 1st round pick in 1999	To New York Rangers Jan Hlavac; 1st round pick in 1999; 3rd round pick in 1999
September 5, 1999	To Calgary Flames Grant Fuhr	To St. Louis Blues 3rd round pick in 2000
September 30, 1999	To Calgary Flames Bill Lindsay	To Florida Panthers Todd Simpson
February 11, 2000	To Calgary Flames Darryl Shannon; Jason Botterill	To Atlanta Thrashers Hnat Domenichelli; Dmitri Vlasenkov
March 6, 2000	To Calgary Flames Marc Bureau	To Philadelphia Flyers Travis Brigley; 6th round pick in 2001
March 14, 2000	To Calgary Flames Brad Werenka	To Pittsburgh Penguins Rene Corbet; Tyler Moss
March 14, 2000	To Calgary Flames Sergei Krivokrasov	To Nashville Predators Cale Hulse; 3rd round pick in 2001
June 10, 2000	To Calgary Flames 2nd round draft pick in 2000	To Mighty Ducks of Anaheim Jean-Sebastien Giguere

=== Free agents ===
Player	Former team

Player	New team
Andrew Cassels	Vancouver Canucks
Ken Wregget	Detroit Red Wings

== Draft picks ==
Calgary's picks at the 1999 NHL entry draft, held in Boston, Massachusetts. The Flames had the 9th overall pick, however they traded down two spots to get Marc Savard from the New York Rangers. With the 11th overall pick, the Flames drafted Oleg Saprykin.

Rnd	Pick	Player	Nationality	Position	Team (league)	NHL statistics				
Rnd	Pick	Player	Nationality	Position	Team (league)	GP	G	A	Pts	PIM
1	11	Oleg Saprykin	Russia	C	Seattle Thunderbirds (WHL)	325	55	82	137	240
2	38	Dan Cavanaugh	United States	C	Boston University (HE)					
3	77	Craig Anderson^{†}	United States	G	Guelph Storm (OHL)	406	182–148–2–48, 2.72GAA			
4	106	Rail Rozakov	Russia	D	Russia					
5	135	Matt Doman	United States	F	Wisconsin (NCAA)					
6	153	Jesse Cook	United States	D	Denver (NCAA)					
6	166	Cory Pecker	Canada	D	Sault Ste. Marie Greyhounds (OHL)					
6	170	Matt Underhill	Canada	G	Cornell (NCAA)	1	0–1–0–0, 3.93GAA			
7	190	Blair Stayzer	Canada	LW	Windsor Spitfires (OHL)					
9	252	Dmitri Kirilenko	Russia	RW	CSKA Moscow (RSL)					

Statistics are updated to the end of the 2014–15 NHL season. ^{†} denotes player was on an NHL roster in 2014–15.

== Farm teams ==
=== Saint John Flames ===
The Baby Flames finished the 1999–2000 season with a .500 record at 32–32–11–5, good enough for 2nd place in the Atlantic Division. They would be swept in the first round of the playoffs by the Lowell Lock Monsters three games to none, however. Daniel Tkaczuk and Benoit Gratton led the team in points with 66 each, while Rico Fata led in goals with 29. Ten different goaltenders suited up for the Flames, led by Jean-Sebastien Giguere, who started 44 games.

== See also ==
- 1999–2000 NHL season
