= 1999–2000 Dallas Stars season =

National Hockey League team season

1999–2000 Dallas Stars
- Western Conference champions
- Pacific Division champions
- Division: 1st Pacific
- Conference: 2nd Western
- 1999–2000 record: 43–23–10–6
- Home record: 21–11–5–4
- Road record: 22–12–5–2
- Goals for: 211
- Goals against: 184

Team information
- General manager: Bob Gainey
- Coach: Ken Hitchcock
- Captain: Derian Hatcher
- Arena: Reunion Arena
- Average attendance: 17,001
- Minor league affiliates: Michigan K-Wings; Dayton Bombers

Team leaders
- Goals: Mike Modano (38)
- Assists: Mike Modano (43)
- Points: Mike Modano (81)
- Penalty minutes: Brenden Morrow (81)
- Plus/minus: Jamie Langenbrunner (+16)
- Wins: Ed Belfour (32)
- Goals against average: Ed Belfour (2.10)

The 1999–2000 Dallas Stars season was the Stars' seventh season. The Stars were the defending Stanley Cup champions and once again advanced to the finals. However, this time they lost to the New Jersey Devils.

== Regular season ==
The Stars allowed the fewest power-play goals during the regular season, with 33, and had the best penalty-kill percentage, at 89.25%.

=== Final standings ===
Pacific Division
No.	CR		GP	W	L	T	OTL	GF	GA	Pts
1	2	**Dallas Stars**	82	43	23	10	6	211	184	102
2	5	**Los Angeles Kings**	82	39	27	12	4	245	228	94
3	6	**Phoenix Coyotes**	82	39	31	8	4	232	228	90
4	8	**San Jose Sharks**	82	35	30	10	7	225	214	87
5	9	Mighty Ducks of Anaheim	82	34	33	12	3	217	227	83

Note: CR = Conference rank; GP = Games played; W = Wins; L = Losses; T = Ties; OTL = Overtime loss; GF = Goals for; GA = Goals against; PIM = Penalties in minutes; Pts = Points
Bolded teams qualified for the playoffs.

Western Conference
R		Div	GP	W	L	T	OTL	GF	GA	Pts
**1**	**p – St. Louis Blues**	**CEN**	**82**	**51**	**19**	**11**	**1**	**248**	**165**	**114**
**2**	**y – Dallas Stars**	**PAC**	**82**	**43**	**23**	**10**	**6**	**211**	**184**	**102**
**3**	**y – Colorado Avalanche**	**NW**	**82**	**42**	**28**	**11**	**1**	**233**	**201**	**96**
**4**	**Detroit Red Wings**	**CEN**	**82**	**48**	**22**	**10**	**2**	**278**	**210**	**108**
**5**	**Los Angeles Kings**	**PAC**	**82**	**39**	**27**	**12**	**4**	**245**	**228**	**94**
**6**	**Phoenix Coyotes**	**PAC**	**82**	**39**	**31**	**8**	**4**	**232**	**228**	**90**
**7**	**Edmonton Oilers**	**NW**	**82**	**32**	**26**	**16**	**8**	**226**	**212**	**88**
**8**	**San Jose Sharks**	**PAC**	**82**	**35**	**30**	**10**	**7**	**225**	**214**	**87**
8.5
9	Mighty Ducks of Anaheim	PAC	82	34	33	12	3	217	227	83
10	Vancouver Canucks	NW	82	30	29	15	8	227	237	83
11	Chicago Blackhawks	CEN	82	33	37	10	2	242	245	78
12	Calgary Flames	NW	82	31	36	10	5	211	256	77
13	Nashville Predators	CEN	82	28	40	7	7	199	240	70

Divisions: CEN – Central, PAC – Pacific, NW – Northwest

bold – Qualified for playoffs; p – Won Presidents' Trophy; y – Won division

== Schedule and results ==
=== Regular season ===
1999–2000 regular season
October: 6–5–1–0 (home: 4–2–1–0; road: 2–3–0–0)

Game	Date	Score	Opponent	Record	Recap
1	October 1, 1999	6–4	Pittsburgh Penguins (1999–2000)	1–0–0–0	W
2	October 2, 1999	2–0	Mighty Ducks of Anaheim (1999–2000)	2–0–0–0	W
3	October 5, 1999	3–2	@ Detroit Red Wings (1999–2000)	3–0–0–0	W
4	October 8, 1999	0–3	@ Mighty Ducks of Anaheim (1999–2000)	3–1–0–0	L
5	October 9, 1999	3–2	@ San Jose Sharks (1999–2000)	4–1–0–0	W
6	October 13, 1999	0–2	San Jose Sharks (1999–2000)	4–2–0–0	L
7	October 15, 1999	2–2 OT	Boston Bruins (1999–2000)	4–2–1–0	T
8	October 16, 1999	2–3	@ Nashville Predators (1999–2000)	4–3–1–0	L
9	October 20, 1999	2–1	Edmonton Oilers (1999–2000)	5–3–1–0	W
10	October 22, 1999	2–1 OT	New Jersey Devils (1999–2000)	6–3–1–0	W
11	October 25, 1999	0–4	@ Toronto Maple Leafs (1999–2000)	6–4–1–0	L
12	October 30, 1999	1–2	Tampa Bay Lightning (1999–2000)	6–5–1–0	L

November: 5–5–2–1 (home: 1–3–0–1; road: 4–2–2–0)

Game	Date	Score	Opponent	Record	Recap
13	November 3, 1999	1–3	Buffalo Sabres (1999–2000)	6–6–1–0	L
14	November 5, 1999	6–4	@ Phoenix Coyotes (1999–2000)	7–6–1–0	W
15	November 6, 1999	1–2	@ San Jose Sharks (1999–2000)	7–7–1–0	L
16	November 9, 1999	5–2	@ St. Louis Blues (1999–2000)	8–7–1–0	W
17	November 10, 1999	2–4	Detroit Red Wings (1999–2000)	8–8–1–0	L
18	November 17, 1999	2–2 OT	@ Washington Capitals (1999–2000)	8–8–2–0	T
19	November 18, 1999	1–1 OT	@ Philadelphia Flyers (1999–2000)	8–8–3–0	T
20	November 20, 1999	0–1	@ Carolina Hurricanes (1999–2000)	8–9–3–0	L
21	November 22, 1999	2–3 OT	Colorado Avalanche (1999–2000)	8–9–3–1	OTL
22	November 24, 1999	3–2 OT	Los Angeles Kings (1999–2000)	9–9–3–1	W
23	November 26, 1999	2–4	Mighty Ducks of Anaheim (1999–2000)	9–10–3–1	L
24	November 28, 1999	4–2	@ Atlanta Thrashers (1999–2000)	10–10–3–1	W
25	November 30, 1999	2–1	@ New York Islanders (1999–2000)	11–10–3–1	W

December: 8–4–2–0 (home: 5–2–0–0; road: 3–2–2–0)

Game	Date	Score	Opponent	Record	Recap
26	December 1, 1999	3–2	@ Montreal Canadiens (1999–2000)	12–10–3–1	W
27	December 4, 1999	3–1	@ Ottawa Senators (1999–2000)	13–10–3–1	W
28	December 6, 1999	2–3	Phoenix Coyotes (1999–2000)	13–11–3–1	L
29	December 8, 1999	2–1	Carolina Hurricanes (1999–2000)	14–11–3–1	W
30	December 10, 1999	4–3	Florida Panthers (1999–2000)	15–11–3–1	W
31	December 11, 1999	2–4	@ St. Louis Blues (1999–2000)	15–12–3–1	L
32	December 15, 1999	5–1	Calgary Flames (1999–2000)	16–12–3–1	W
33	December 17, 1999	2–2 OT	@ Edmonton Oilers (1999–2000)	16–12–4–1	T
34	December 18, 1999	4–2	@ Vancouver Canucks (1999–2000)	17–12–4–1	W
35	December 21, 1999	0–0 OT	@ Calgary Flames (1999–2000)	17–12–5–1	T
36	December 23, 1999	2–5	@ Chicago Blackhawks (1999–2000)	17–13–5–1	L
37	December 27, 1999	1–3	San Jose Sharks (1999–2000)	17–14–5–1	L
38	December 29, 1999	4–3 OT	New York Rangers (1999–2000)	18–14–5–1	W
39	December 31, 1999	5–4	Mighty Ducks of Anaheim (1999–2000)	19–14–5–1	W

January: 8–3–0–1 (home: 4–2–0–0; road: 4–1–0–1)

Game	Date	Score	Opponent	Record	Recap
40	January 3, 2000	4–1	Los Angeles Kings (1999–2000)	20–14–5–1	W
41	January 5, 2000	3–1	Nashville Predators (1999–2000)	21–14–5–1	W
42	January 7, 2000	1–3	Vancouver Canucks (1999–2000)	21–15–5–1	L
43	January 11, 2000	3–2	@ Edmonton Oilers (1999–2000)	22–15–5–1	W
44	January 12, 2000	1–2 OT	@ Calgary Flames (1999–2000)	22–15–5–2	OTL
45	January 15, 2000	2–1	@ Vancouver Canucks (1999–2000)	23–15–5–2	W
46	January 19, 2000	1–3	@ Mighty Ducks of Anaheim (1999–2000)	23–16–5–2	L
47	January 20, 2000	5–2	@ Los Angeles Kings (1999–2000)	24–16–5–2	W
48	January 23, 2000	3–2	@ Chicago Blackhawks (1999–2000)	25–16–5–2	W
49	January 26, 2000	3–1	Los Angeles Kings (1999–2000)	26–16–5–2	W
50	January 28, 2000	1–3	St. Louis Blues (1999–2000)	26–17–5–2	L
51	January 31, 2000	2–1	Edmonton Oilers (1999–2000)	27–17–5–2	W

February: 7–3–1–1 (home: 3–1–1–1; road: 4–2–0–0)

Game	Date	Score	Opponent	Record	Recap
52	February 2, 2000	2–1	Atlanta Thrashers (1999–2000)	28–17–5–2	W
53	February 3, 2000	2–0	@ Phoenix Coyotes (1999–2000)	29–17–5–2	W
54	February 9, 2000	5–3	@ Mighty Ducks of Anaheim (1999–2000)	30–17–5–2	W
55	February 11, 2000	2–3	@ Los Angeles Kings (1999–2000)	30–18–5–2	L
56	February 13, 2000	2–1	Washington Capitals (1999–2000)	31–18–5–2	W
57	February 16, 2000	3–0	Nashville Predators (1999–2000)	32–18–5–2	W
58	February 18, 2000	3–4	Phoenix Coyotes (1999–2000)	32–19–5–2	L
59	February 20, 2000	2–1	@ Colorado Avalanche (1999–2000)	33–19–5–2	W
60	February 21, 2000	2–5	@ Nashville Predators (1999–2000)	33–20–5–2	L
61	February 23, 2000	5–2	@ Detroit Red Wings (1999–2000)	34–20–5–2	W
62	February 25, 2000	3–4 OT	Chicago Blackhawks (1999–2000)	34–20–5–3	OTL
63	February 27, 2000	1–1 OT	Colorado Avalanche (1999–2000)	34–20–6–3	T

March: 9–1–2–2 (home: 4–1–1–2; road: 5–0–1–0)

Game	Date	Score	Opponent	Record	Recap
64	March 1, 2000	2–0	Philadelphia Flyers (1999–2000)	35–20–6–3	W
65	March 3, 2000	4–1	@ Phoenix Coyotes (1999–2000)	36–20–6–3	W
66	March 5, 2000	3–5	Detroit Red Wings (1999–2000)	36–21–6–3	L
67	March 8, 2000	3–3 OT	Vancouver Canucks (1999–2000)	36–21–7–3	T
68	March 10, 2000	3–4 OT	New York Islanders (1999–2000)	36–21–7–4	OTL
69	March 12, 2000	4–2	St. Louis Blues (1999–2000)	37–21–7–4	W
70	March 13, 2000	4–3	@ New York Rangers (1999–2000)	38–21–7–4	W
71	March 15, 2000	3–2	@ New Jersey Devils (1999–2000)	39–21–7–4	W
72	March 18, 2000	2–2 OT	@ Chicago Blackhawks (1999–2000)	39–21–8–4	T
73	March 19, 2000	5–3	San Jose Sharks (1999–2000)	40–21–8–4	W
74	March 24, 2000	5–1	Chicago Blackhawks (1999–2000)	41–21–8–4	W
75	March 26, 2000	1–2 OT	Colorado Avalanche (1999–2000)	41–21–8–5	OTL
76	March 28, 2000	4–2	@ Tampa Bay Lightning (1999–2000)	42–21–8–5	W
77	March 29, 2000	4–1	@ Florida Panthers (1999–2000)	43–21–8–5	W

April: 0–2–2–1 (home: 0–0–2–0; road: 0–2–0–1)

Game	Date	Score	Opponent	Record	Recap
78	April 2, 2000	2–3 OT	@ Colorado Avalanche (1999–2000)	43–21–8–6	OTL
79	April 3, 2000	2–2 OT	Calgary Flames (1999–2000)	43–21–9–6	T
80	April 5, 2000	2–5	@ San Jose Sharks (1999–2000)	43–22–9–6	L
81	April 7, 2000	2–3	@ Los Angeles Kings (1999–2000)	43–23–9–6	L
82	April 9, 2000	2–2 OT	Phoenix Coyotes (1999–2000)	43–23–10–6	T

Legend: W Win (2 points) L Loss (0 points) T Tie (1 point) OTL Overtime loss (1 point)

=== Playoffs ===
2000 Stanley Cup playoffs
Western Conference Quarterfinals vs. (7) Edmonton Oilers: Stars win 4–1

Game	Date	Score	Opponent	Series	Recap
1	April 12, 2000	2–1	Edmonton Oilers	Stars lead 1–0	W
2	April 13, 2000	3–0	Edmonton Oilers	Stars lead 2–0	W
3	April 16, 2000	2–5	@ Edmonton Oilers	Stars lead 2–1	L
4	April 18, 2000	4–3	@ Edmonton Oilers	Stars lead 3–1	W
5	April 21, 2000	3–2	Edmonton Oilers	Stars win 4–1	W

Western Conference Semifinals vs. (8) San Jose Sharks: Stars win 4–1

Game	Date	Score	Opponent	Series	Recap
1	April 28, 2000	4–0	San Jose Sharks	Stars lead 1–0	W
2	April 30, 2000	1–0	San Jose Sharks	Stars lead 2–0	W
3	May 2, 2000	1–2	@ San Jose Sharks	Stars lead 2–1	L
4	May 5, 2000	5–4	@ San Jose Sharks	Stars lead 3–1	W
5	May 7, 2000	4–1	San Jose Sharks	Stars win 4–1	W

Western Conference Finals vs. (3) Colorado Avalanche – Stars win 4–3

Game	Date	Score	Opponent	Series	Recap
1	May 13, 2000	0–2	Colorado Avalanche	Avalanche lead 1–0	L
2	May 15, 2000	3–2	Colorado Avalanche	Series tied 1–1	W
3	May 19, 2000	0–2	@ Colorado Avalanche	Avalanche lead 2–1	L
4	May 21, 2000	4–1	@ Colorado Avalanche	Series tied 2–2	W
5	May 23, 2000	3–2 OT	Colorado Avalanche	Stars lead 3–2	W
6	May 25, 2000	1–2	@ Colorado Avalanche	Series tied 3–3	L
7	May 27, 2000	3–2	Colorado Avalanche	Stars win 4–3	W

Stanley Cup Final vs. (E4) New Jersey Devils – Devils win 4–2

Game	Date	Score	Opponent	Series	Recap
1	May 30, 2000	3–7	@ New Jersey Devils	Devils lead 1–0	L
2	June 1, 2000	2–1	@ New Jersey Devils	Series tied 1–1	W
3	June 3, 2000	1–2	New Jersey Devils	Devils lead 2–1	L
4	June 5, 2000	1–3	New Jersey Devils	Devils lead 3–1	L
5	June 8, 2000	1–0 3OT	@ New Jersey Devils	Devils lead 3–2	W
6	June 10, 2000	1–2 2OT	New Jersey Devils	Devils win 4–2	L

Legend: W Win L Loss

== Player statistics ==
=== Scoring ===
- Position abbreviations: C = Center; D = Defense; G = Goaltender; LW = Left wing; RW = Right wing
- † = Joined team via a transaction (e.g., trade, waivers, signing) during the season. Stats reflect time with the Stars only.
- ‡ = Left team via a transaction (e.g., trade, waivers, release) during the season. Stats reflect time with the Stars only.

No.	Player	Pos	Regular season						Playoffs					
No.	Player	Pos	GP	G	A	Pts	+/-	PIM	GP	G	A	Pts	+/-	PIM
9	Mike Modano	C	77	38	43	81	0	48	23	10	13	23	3	10
16	Brett Hull	RW	79	24	35	59	−21	43	23	11	13	24	3	4
56	Sergei Zubov	D	77	9	33	42	−2	18	18	2	7	9	1	6
15	Jamie Langenbrunner	RW	65	18	21	39	16	68	15	1	7	8	−1	18
25	Joe Nieuwendyk	C	48	15	19	34	−1	26	23	7	3	10	−2	18
12	Mike Keane	RW	81	13	21	34	9	41	23	2	4	6	1	14
5	Darryl Sydor	D	74	8	26	34	6	32	23	1	6	7	1	6
45	Brenden Morrow	LW	64	14	19	33	8	81	21	2	4	6	2	22
24	Richard Matvichuk	D	70	4	21	25	7	42	23	2	5	7	7	14
2	Derian Hatcher	D	57	2	22	24	6	68	23	1	3	4	−4	29
22	Kirk Muller†	LW	47	7	15	22	−3	24	23	2	3	5	−2	18
11	Blake Sloan	RW	67	4	13	17	11	50	16	0	0	0	2	12
21	Guy Carbonneau	C	69	10	6	16	10	36	23	2	4	6	2	12
44	Aaron Gavey	C	41	7	6	13	0	44	13	1	2	3	1	10
36	Roman Lyashenko	C	58	6	6	12	−2	10	16	2	1	3	−1	0
3	Sylvain Cote†	D	28	2	8	10	6	14	23	2	1	3	0	8
17	Scott Thornton†	LW	30	6	3	9	−5	38	23	2	7	9	1	28
49	Jon Sim	LW	25	5	3	8	4	10	7	1	0	1	0	6
26	Jere Lehtinen	RW	17	3	5	8	1	0	13	1	5	6	1	2
29	Grant Marshall	RW	45	2	6	8	−5	38	14	0	1	1	0	4
4	Jamie Pushor	D	62	0	8	8	0	53	5	0	0	0	−1	5
14	Juha Lind‡	C	34	3	4	7	−1	6	—	—	—	—	—	—
22	Pavel Patera	C	12	1	4	5	−1	4	—	—	—	—	—	—
46	Jamie Wright	LW	23	1	4	5	4	16	—	—	—	—	—	—
37	Brad Lukowich	D	60	3	1	4	−14	50	—	—	—	—	—	—
23	Chris Murray	RW	32	2	1	3	−7	62	—	—	—	—	—	—
28	Ric Jackman	D	22	1	2	3	−1	6	—	—	—	—	—	—
6	Dave Manson†	D	26	1	2	3	10	22	23	0	0	0	2	33
10	Brian Skrudland	C	22	1	2	3	0	22	—	—	—	—	—	—
20	Ed Belfour	G	62	0	3	3		10	23	0	0	0		8
18	Derek Plante‡	C	16	1	1	2	−4	2	—	—	—	—	—	—
30	Manny Fernandez	G	24	0	2	2		2	1	0	0	0		0
17	Warren Luhning	RW	10	0	1	1	−2	13	—	—	—	—	—	—
41	Keith Aldridge	D	4	0	0	0	1	0	—	—	—	—	—	—
18	Joel Bouchard†	D	2	0	0	0	1	2	—	—	—	—	—	—
27	Shawn Chambers	D	4	0	0	0	−2	4	—	—	—	—	—	—
50	Ryan Christie	LW	5	0	0	0	−1	0	—	—	—	—	—	—
6	Kevin Dean†‡	D	14	0	0	0	−1	10	—	—	—	—	—	—
38	Alan Letang	D	8	0	0	0	−5	2	—	—	—	—	—	—

=== Goaltending ===
No.	Player	Regular season										Playoffs								
No.	Player	GP	W	L	T	SA	GA	GAA	SV%	SO	TOI	GP	W	L	SA	GA	GAA	SV%	SO	TOI
20	Ed Belfour	62	32	21	7	1571	127	2.10	.919	4	3620	23	14	9	651	45	1.87	.931	4	1443
30	Manny Fernandez	24	11	8	3	603	48	2.13	.920	1	1353	1	0	0	8	1	3.53	.875	0	17

== Awards and records ==
=== Awards ===
Type	Award/honor	Recipient	Ref
League (annual)	NHL Second All-Star Team	Mike Modano (Center)	
League (annual)	Roger Crozier Saving Grace Award	Ed Belfour	
League (in-season)	NHL All-Star Game selection	Mike Modano	
League (in-season)	NHL All-Star Game selection	Sergei Zubov	
Team	Star of the Game Award	Mike Modano	

=== Milestones ===
Milestone	Player	Date	Ref
First game	Pavel Patera	October 1, 1999	
First game	Alan Letang	October 9, 1999	
First game	Keith Aldridge	October 15, 1999	
First game	Ric Jackman	October 22, 1999	
First game	Ryan Christie	November 5, 1999	
First game	Roman Lyashenko	November 5, 1999	
First game	Brenden Morrow	November 18, 1999	

== Draft picks ==
Dallas's draft picks at the 1999 NHL entry draft held at the FleetCenter in Boston, Massachusetts.

Round	#	Player	Nationality	College/Junior/Club team (League)
2	32	Michael Ryan	United States	Northeastern University (NCAA)
2	66	Dan Jancevski	Canada	London Knights (OHL)
3	96	Mathias Tjarnqvist	Sweden	Rogle BK (Sweden)
4	126	Jeff Bateman	Canada	Brampton Battalion (OHL)
5	156	Gregor Baumgartner	Austria	Acadie-Bathurst Titan (QMJHL)
6	184	Justin Cox	Canada	Prince George Cougars (WHL)
6	186	Brett Draney	Canada	Kamloops Blazers (WHL)
7	215	Jeff MacMillan	Canada	Oshawa Generals (OHL)
8	243	Brian Sullivan	United States	Thayer Academy (USHS-MA)
9	265	Jamie Chamberlain	Canada	Peterborough Petes (OHL)
9	272	Mikhail Donika	Russia	Yaroslavl Torpedo (Russia)
