= 1999–2000 Vancouver Canucks season =

NHL hockey team season

1999–2000 Vancouver Canucks
- Division: 3rd Northwest
- Conference: 10th Western
- 1999–2000 record: 30–29–15–8
- Home record: 16–14–5–6
- Road record: 14–15–10–2
- Goals for: 227
- Goals against: 237

Team information
- General manager: Brian Burke
- Coach: Marc Crawford
- Captain: Mark Messier
- Alternate captains: Markus Naslund; Mattias Ohlund
- Arena: General Motors Place
- Average attendance: 14,641
- Minor league affiliate: Syracuse Crunch (AHL)

Team leaders
- Goals: Markus Naslund (27)
- Assists: Andrew Cassels (45)
- Points: Markus Naslund (65)
- Penalty minutes: Donald Brashear (136)
- Plus/minus: Harold Druken (+14)
- Wins: Felix Potvin (12)
- Goals against average: Felix Potvin (2.59)

The 1999–2000 Vancouver Canucks season was the team's 30th in the National Hockey League (NHL). The Canucks missed the playoffs for the fourth consecutive season.

== Regular season ==
- December 12, 1999: With a victory over the Vancouver Canucks, Patrick Roy passed Tony Esposito's mark of 423 victories.

=== Final standings ===
Northwest Division
No.	CR		GP	W	L	T	OTL	GF	GA	Pts
1	3	**Colorado Avalanche**	82	42	28	11	1	233	201	96
2	7	**Edmonton Oilers**	82	32	26	16	8	226	212	88
3	10	Vancouver Canucks	82	30	29	15	8	227	237	83
4	12	Calgary Flames	82	31	36	10	5	211	256	77

Note: CR = Conference rank; GP = Games played; W = Wins; L = Losses; T = Ties; OTL = Overtime loss; GF = Goals for; GA = Goals against; PIM = Penalties in minutes; Pts = Points
Bolded teams qualified for the playoffs.

Western Conference
R		Div	GP	W	L	T	OTL	GF	GA	Pts
**1**	**p – St. Louis Blues**	**CEN**	**82**	**51**	**19**	**11**	**1**	**248**	**165**	**114**
**2**	**y – Dallas Stars**	**PAC**	**82**	**43**	**23**	**10**	**6**	**211**	**184**	**102**
**3**	**y – Colorado Avalanche**	**NW**	**82**	**42**	**28**	**11**	**1**	**233**	**201**	**96**
**4**	**Detroit Red Wings**	**CEN**	**82**	**48**	**22**	**10**	**2**	**278**	**210**	**108**
**5**	**Los Angeles Kings**	**PAC**	**82**	**39**	**27**	**12**	**4**	**245**	**228**	**94**
**6**	**Phoenix Coyotes**	**PAC**	**82**	**39**	**31**	**8**	**4**	**232**	**228**	**90**
**7**	**Edmonton Oilers**	**NW**	**82**	**32**	**26**	**16**	**8**	**226**	**212**	**88**
**8**	**San Jose Sharks**	**PAC**	**82**	**35**	**30**	**10**	**7**	**225**	**214**	**87**
8.5
9	Mighty Ducks of Anaheim	PAC	82	34	33	12	3	217	227	83
10	Vancouver Canucks	NW	82	30	29	15	8	227	237	83
11	Chicago Blackhawks	CEN	82	33	37	10	2	242	245	78
12	Calgary Flames	NW	82	31	36	10	5	211	256	77
13	Nashville Predators	CEN	82	28	40	7	7	199	240	70

Divisions: CEN – Central, PAC – Pacific, NW – Northwest

bold – Qualified for playoffs; p – Won Presidents' Trophy; y – Won division

== Schedule and results ==
1999–2000 regular season
October: 7–3–2–1 (home: 4–2–0–1; road: 3–1–2–0)

Game	Date	Score	Opponent	Record	Recap
1	October 2, 1999	2–1	New York Rangers (1999–2000)	1–0–0–0	W
2	October 6, 1999	5–4	Chicago Blackhawks (1999–2000)	2–0–0–0	W
3	October 9, 1999	4–1	Montreal Canadiens (1999–2000)	3–0–0–0	W
4	October 13, 1999	3–4 OT	Calgary Flames (1999–2000)	3–0–0–1	OTL
5	October 15, 1999	1–4	Carolina Hurricanes (1999–2000)	3–1–0–1	L
6	October 16, 1999	4–4 OT	@ Calgary Flames (1999–2000)	3–1–1–1	T
7	October 19, 1999	6–5 OT	@ Tampa Bay Lightning (1999–2000)	4–1–1–1	W
8	October 20, 1999	2–5	@ Florida Panthers (1999–2000)	4–2–1–1	L
9	October 23, 1999	2–2 OT	@ New York Islanders (1999–2000)	4–2–2–1	T
10	October 24, 1999	3–0	@ New York Rangers (1999–2000)	5–2–2–1	W
11	October 26, 1999	5–2	@ Philadelphia Flyers (1999–2000)	6–2–2–1	W
12	October 28, 1999	1–4	Phoenix Coyotes (1999–2000)	6–3–2–1	L
13	October 30, 1999	4–1	Nashville Predators (1999–2000)	7–3–2–1	W

November: 3–5–4–0 (home: 1–3–2–0; road: 2–2–2–0)

Game	Date	Score	Opponent	Record	Recap
14	November 5, 1999	3–2	Florida Panthers (1999–2000)	8–3–2–1	W
15	November 7, 1999	1–6	St. Louis Blues (1999–2000)	8–4–2–1	L
16	November 9, 1999	4–4 OT	San Jose Sharks (1999–2000)	8–4–3–1	T
17	November 12, 1999	3–2	@ Phoenix Coyotes (1999–2000)	9–4–3–1	W
18	November 15, 1999	2–2 OT	Colorado Avalanche (1999–2000)	9–4–4–1	T
19	November 17, 1999	2–7	Detroit Red Wings (1999–2000)	9–5–4–1	L
20	November 20, 1999	3–1	@ Nashville Predators (1999–2000)	10–5–4–1	W
21	November 22, 1999	3–6	@ Atlanta Thrashers (1999–2000)	10–6–4–1	L
22	November 24, 1999	1–1 OT	@ Carolina Hurricanes (1999–2000)	10–6–5–1	T
23	November 26, 1999	2–2 OT	@ Boston Bruins (1999–2000)	10–6–6–1	T
24	November 27, 1999	1–2	@ Montreal Canadiens (1999–2000)	10–7–6–1	L
25	November 30, 1999	2–4	Colorado Avalanche (1999–2000)	10–8–6–1	L

December: 2–6–1–2 (home: 2–3–0–2; road: 0–3–1–0)

Game	Date	Score	Opponent	Record	Recap
26	December 2, 1999	3–2 OT	Edmonton Oilers (1999–2000)	11–8–6–1	W
27	December 4, 1999	2–3	@ Edmonton Oilers (1999–2000)	11–9–6–1	L
28	December 6, 1999	2–5	@ Colorado Avalanche (1999–2000)	11–10–6–1	L
29	December 8, 1999	2–2 OT	@ Mighty Ducks of Anaheim (1999–2000)	11–10–7–1	T
30	December 10, 1999	2–3	@ Calgary Flames (1999–2000)	11–11–7–1	L
31	December 12, 1999	2–3 OT	Colorado Avalanche (1999–2000)	11–11–7–2	OTL
32	December 16, 1999	1–2	Ottawa Senators (1999–2000)	11–12–7–2	L
33	December 18, 1999	2–4	Dallas Stars (1999–2000)	11–13–7–2	L
34	December 22, 1999	6–3	Washington Capitals (1999–2000)	12–13–7–2	W
35	December 26, 1999	0–2	Calgary Flames (1999–2000)	12–14–7–2	L
36	December 29, 1999	2–3 OT	Philadelphia Flyers (1999–2000)	12–14–7–3	OTL

January: 3–5–3–3 (home: 1–3–2–2; road: 2–2–1–1)

Game	Date	Score	Opponent	Record	Recap
37	January 2, 2000	2–4	@ Calgary Flames (1999–2000)	12–15–7–3	L
38	January 5, 2000	3–3 OT	Tampa Bay Lightning (1999–2000)	12–15–8–3	T
39	January 7, 2000	3–1	@ Dallas Stars (1999–2000)	13–15–8–3	W
40	January 8, 2000	2–4	@ St. Louis Blues (1999–2000)	13–16–8–3	L
41	January 12, 2000	2–3 OT	@ Chicago Blackhawks (1999–2000)	13–16–8–4	OTL
42	January 13, 2000	4–3 OT	@ Nashville Predators (1999–2000)	14–16–8–4	W
43	January 15, 2000	1–2	Dallas Stars (1999–2000)	14–17–8–4	L
44	January 17, 2000	4–5 OT	Toronto Maple Leafs (1999–2000)	14–17–8–5	OTL
45	January 19, 2000	3–3 OT	Detroit Red Wings (1999–2000)	14–17–9–5	T
46	January 22, 2000	3–3 OT	@ Edmonton Oilers (1999–2000)	14–17–10–5	T
47	January 23, 2000	1–2	Nashville Predators (1999–2000)	14–18–10–5	L
48	January 25, 2000	4–5 OT	Edmonton Oilers (1999–2000)	14–18–10–6	OTL
49	January 28, 2000	4–1	San Jose Sharks (1999–2000)	15–18–10–6	W
50	January 30, 2000	1–3	Chicago Blackhawks (1999–2000)	15–19–10–6	L

February: 6–5–2–0 (home: 3–2–0–0; road: 3–3–2–0)

Game	Date	Score	Opponent	Record	Recap
51	February 1, 2000	1–2	@ Colorado Avalanche (1999–2000)	15–20–10–6	L
52	February 3, 2000	2–5	St. Louis Blues (1999–2000)	15–21–10–6	L
53	February 9, 2000	4–3 OT	Calgary Flames (1999–2000)	16–21–10–6	W
54	February 12, 2000	4–1	@ Toronto Maple Leafs (1999–2000)	17–21–10–6	W
55	February 14, 2000	0–3	@ Pittsburgh Penguins (1999–2000)	17–22–10–6	L
56	February 16, 2000	2–5	@ Detroit Red Wings (1999–2000)	17–23–10–6	L
57	February 17, 2000	2–1	@ Buffalo Sabres (1999–2000)	18–23–10–6	W
58	February 19, 2000	3–1	@ Ottawa Senators (1999–2000)	19–23–10–6	W
59	February 21, 2000	5–2	Boston Bruins (1999–2000)	20–23–10–6	W
60	February 23, 2000	4–4 OT	@ Mighty Ducks of Anaheim (1999–2000)	20–23–11–6	T
61	February 25, 2000	2–5	Los Angeles Kings (1999–2000)	20–24–11–6	L
62	February 27, 2000	2–1	Phoenix Coyotes (1999–2000)	21–24–11–6	W
63	February 29, 2000	1–1 OT	@ Los Angeles Kings (1999–2000)	21–24–12–6	T

March: 7–4–2–2 (home: 5–0–0–1; road: 2–4–2–1)

Game	Date	Score	Opponent	Record	Recap
64	March 2, 2000	3–1	Mighty Ducks of Anaheim (1999–2000)	22–24–12–6	W
65	March 4, 2000	4–2	New Jersey Devils (1999–2000)	23–24–12–6	W
66	March 6, 2000	5–6 OT	Toronto Maple Leafs (1999–2000)	23–24–12–7	OTL
67	March 8, 2000	3–3 OT	@ Dallas Stars (1999–2000)	23–24–13–7	T
68	March 9, 2000	2–2 OT	@ St. Louis Blues (1999–2000)	23–24–14–7	T
69	March 11, 2000	0–5	@ Phoenix Coyotes (1999–2000)	23–25–14–7	L
70	March 13, 2000	2–3 OT	@ Los Angeles Kings (1999–2000)	23–25–14–8	OTL
71	March 16, 2000	6–3	Buffalo Sabres (1999–2000)	24–25–14–8	W
72	March 18, 2000	6–1	Ottawa Senators (1999–2000)	25–25–14–8	W
73	March 20, 2000	3–2	@ Colorado Avalanche (1999–2000)	26–25–14–8	W
74	March 22, 2000	3–4	@ San Jose Sharks (1999–2000)	26–26–14–8	L
75	March 24, 2000	8–1	Mighty Ducks of Anaheim (1999–2000)	27–26–14–8	W
76	March 25, 2000	3–2	@ Edmonton Oilers (1999–2000)	28–26–14–8	W
77	March 29, 2000	3–6	@ Detroit Red Wings (1999–2000)	28–27–14–8	L
78	March 31, 2000	1–2	@ Nashville Predators (1999–2000)	28–28–14–8	L

April: 2–1–1–0 (home: 0–1–1–0; road: 2–0–0–0)

Game	Date	Score	Opponent	Record	Recap
79	April 2, 2000	3–2	@ Chicago Blackhawks (1999–2000)	29–28–14–8	W
80	April 5, 2000	1–1 OT	Los Angeles Kings (1999–2000)	29–28–15–8	T
81	April 7, 2000	4–5 OT	Edmonton Oilers (1999–2000)	29–29–15–8 (Note: Rule 84.2 of the NHL rulebook states "A team shall be allowed to pull its goalkeeper in favor of an additional skater in the overtime period. However, should that team lose the game during the time in which the goalkeeper has been removed, it would forfeit the automatic point gained in the tie at the end of regulation play, except if the goalkeeper has been removed at the call of a delayed penalty against the other team." The Canucks pulled F. Potvin in OT and lost the game in OT, so they forfeit that 1 point for the OTL)	L
82	April 9, 2000	5–2	@ San Jose Sharks (1999–2000)	30–29–15–8	W

Legend: W Win (2 points) L Loss (0 points) T Tie (1 point) OTL Overtime loss (1 point)

== Player statistics ==
=== Scoring ===
- Position abbreviations: C = Centre; D = Defence; G = Goaltender; LW = Left wing; RW = Right wing
- † = Joined team via a transaction (e.g., trade, waivers, signing) during the season. Stats reflect time with the Canucks only.
- ‡ = Left team via a transaction (e.g., trade, waivers, release) during the season. Stats reflect time with the Canucks only.

No.	Player	Pos	Regular season					
No.	Player	Pos	GP	G	A	Pts	+/-	PIM
19	Markus Naslund	LW	82	27	38	65	−5	64
25	Andrew Cassels	C	79	17	45	62	8	16
11	Mark Messier	C	66	17	37	54	−15	30
44	Todd Bertuzzi	RW	80	25	25	50	−2	126
89	Alexander Mogilny‡	RW	47	21	17	38	7	16
72 (Note: Schaefer wore number 29 until Potvin was acquired.)	Peter Schaefer	LW	71	16	15	31	0	20
55	Ed Jovanovski	D	75	5	21	26	−3	54
6	Adrian Aucoin	D	57	10	14	24	7	30
4	Greg Hawgood	D	79	5	17	22	5	26
26	Trent Klatt	RW	47	10	10	20	−8	26
2	Mattias Ohlund	D	42	4	16	20	6	24
18	Steve Kariya	LW	45	8	11	19	9	22
27	Harry York	C	54	4	13	17	−4	20
9	Brad May	LW	59	9	7	16	−2	90
15	Harold Druken	C	33	7	9	16	14	10
8	Donald Brashear	LW	60	11	2	13	−9	136
24	Matt Cooke	LW	51	5	7	12	3	39
17	Bill Muckalt‡	RW	33	4	8	12	6	17
23	Murray Baron	D	81	2	10	12	8	67
28	Chris Joseph‡	D	38	2	9	11	−4	6
14	Darby Hendrickson	C	40	5	4	9	−3	14
7	Brendan Morrison†	C	12	2	7	9	4	10
13	Artem Chubarov	C	49	1	8	9	−4	10
3	Brent Sopel	D	18	2	4	6	9	12
21	Josh Holden	C	6	1	5	6	2	2
20	Denis Pederson†	C	12	3	2	5	1	2
39	Chris O'Sullivan	D	11	0	5	5	2	2
34	Jason Strudwick	D	63	1	3	4	−13	64
20	Dave Scatchard‡	C	21	0	4	4	−3	24
17	Vadim Sharifijanov†	RW	17	2	1	3	−7	14
5	Zenith Komarniski	D	18	1	1	2	−1	8
29	Felix Potvin†	G	34	0	2	2		2
30	Garth Snow	G	32	0	2	2		8
3	Doug Bodger‡	D	13	0	1	1	−6	4
37	Jarkko Ruutu	LW	8	0	1	1	−1	6
36	Ryan Bonni	D	3	0	0	0	−1	0
38	Brad Leeb†	RW	2	0	0	0	−2	2
33	Alfie Michaud	G	2	0	0	0		0
32	Corey Schwab†	G	6	0	0	0		2
31	Lubomir Vaic	C	4	0	0	0	0	0
35	Kevin Weekes‡	G	20	0	0	0		0

=== Goaltending ===
- † = Joined team via a transaction (e.g., trade, waivers, signing) during the season. Stats reflect time with the Canucks only.
- ‡ = Left team via a transaction (e.g., trade, waivers, release) during the season. Stats reflect time with the Canucks only.

No.	Player	Regular season									
No.	Player	GP	W	L	T	SA	GA	GAA	SV%	SO	TOI
29	Felix Potvin†	34	12	13	7	906	85	2.51	.906	0	1966
30	Garth Snow	32	10	15	3	775	76	2.68	.902	0	1712
35	Kevin Weekes‡	20	6	7	4	461	47	2.85	.898	1	987
32	Corey Schwab†	6	2	1	1	115	16	3.57	.861	0	269
33	Alfie Michaud	2	0	1	0	27	5	4.32	.815	0	69

== Awards and records ==
=== Awards ===
Type	Award/honour	Recipient	Ref
League (in-season)	NHL All-Star Game selection	Mark Messier	
League (in-season)	NHL Player of the Week	Markus Naslund (March 20)	
League (in-season)	NHL Rookie of the Month	Peter Schaefer (October)	
Team	Babe Pratt Trophy	Mattias Ohlund	
Team	Cyclone Taylor Trophy	Mark Messier	
Team	Cyrus H. McLean Trophy	Markus Naslund	
Team	Fred J. Hume Award	Andrew Cassels	
Team	Molson Cup	Mark Messier	
Team	Most Exciting Player Award	Todd Bertuzzi	

=== Milestones ===
Milestone	Player	Date	Ref
First game	Artem Chubarov	October 2, 1999	
First game	Steve Kariya	October 2, 1999	
First game	Alfie Michaud	October 28, 1999	
First game	Zenith Komarniski	November 20, 1999	
First game	Jarkko Ruutu	November 20, 1999	
First game	Harold Druken	November 30, 1999	
First game	Ryan Bonni	December 4, 1999	
First game	Brad Leeb	December 12, 1999	

== Transactions ==
=== Trades ===
June 1, 1999	To Vancouver Canucks Pat Kavanagh	To Philadelphia Flyers 6th round pick in 1999 (Konstantin Rudenko)
June 26, 1999	To Vancouver Canucks 4th overall pick in 1999	To Chicago Blackhawks Bryan McCabe; 1st round pick in 2000 (Pavel Vorobiev)
June 26, 1999	To Vancouver Canucks 1st overall selection in 1999 (Patrik Stefan)	To Tampa Bay Lightning 4th overall pick in 1999 (previously acquired from Chicago); 3rd round pick in 1999 (No. 75-Brett Scheffelmaier); 3rd round pick in 1999 (No. 88-Jimmie Olvestad)
June 26, 1999	To Vancouver Canucks 2nd overall draft pick in 1999 (Daniel Sedin) conditional 3rd round pick in 2000 (Max Birbraer)	To Atlanta Thrashers 1st overall selection in 1999 (Patrik Stefan)
June 26, 1999	To Vancouver Canucks 6th round draft pick in 1999 (Josh Reed)	To San Jose Sharks 6th round draft pick in 2001 (Tom Cavanagh)
October 28, 1999	To Vancouver Canucks Corey Schwab	To Atlanta Thrashers conditional draft pick in 2000 (Carl Mallette)
December 19, 1999	To Vancouver Canucks Felix Potvin; 2nd round draft pick in 2000 (Teemu Laine); 3rd round draft pick in 2000 (Thatcher Bell)	To New York Islanders Bill Muckalt; Dave Scatchard; Kevin Weekes
January 14, 2000	To Vancouver Canucks Vadim Sharifijanov; 3rd round draft pick in 2000 (Tim Branham)	To New Jersey Devils 2nd round draft pick in 2000 (Teemu Laine); 3rd round draft pick in 2000 (Max Birbraer)
March 14, 2000	To Vancouver Canucks Brendan Morrison; Denis Pederson	To New Jersey Devils Alexander Mogilny

== Draft picks ==
Vancouver's picks at the 1999 NHL entry draft in Boston, Massachusetts.

Round	#	Player	Nationality	NHL team	College/Junior/Club team (League)
1	2	Daniel Sedin (LW)	Sweden	Vancouver Canucks (from Atlanta)	Modo (Elitserien)
1	3	Henrik Sedin (C)	Sweden	Vancouver Canucks	Modo (Elitserien)
3	69	Rene Vydareny (D)	Slovakia	Vancouver Canucks	Slovan Bratislava (Slovak Extraliga)
5	129	Ryan Thorpe (LW)	Canada	Vancouver Canucks	Spokane Chiefs (WHL)
6	172	Josh Reed (D)	Canada	Vancouver Canucks (from San Jose)	Vernon Vipers (BCHL)
7	189	Kevin Swanson (G)	Canada	Vancouver Canucks	Kelowna Rockets (WHL)
8	218	Markus Kankaanpera (D)	Finland	Vancouver Canucks	JYP (Liiga)
9	271	Darrell Hay (D)	Canada	Vancouver Canucks	Tri-City Americans (WHL)

== Farm teams ==
Syracuse Crunch (AHL)

== See also ==
- 1999–2000 NHL season
