= 1999–2000 San Jose Sharks season =

1999–2000 San Jose Sharks
- Division: 4th Pacific
- Conference: 8th Western
- 1999–2000 record: 35–30–10–7
- Home record: 21–14–3–3
- Road record: 14–16–7–4
- Goals for: 225
- Goals against: 214

Team information
- General manager: Dean Lombardi
- Coach: Darryl Sutter
- Captain: Owen Nolan
- Alternate captains: Vincent Damphousse; Gary Suter
- Arena: San Jose Arena
- Average attendance: 17,290
- Minor league affiliates: Kentucky Thoroughblades; Richmond Renegades

Team leaders
- Goals: Owen Nolan (44)
- Assists: Vincent Damphousse (49)
- Points: Owen Nolan (84)
- Penalty minutes: Ronnie Stern (151)
- Plus/minus: Mike Ricci (+14)
- Wins: Steve Shields (27)
- Goals against average: Evgeni Nabokov (2.17)

The 1999–2000 San Jose Sharks season was the team's ninth season of operation in the National Hockey League (NHL). Under third-year head coach Darryl Sutter, the Sharks posted a winning record for the first time in franchise history; in doing so, they managed to clinch a playoff berth for the third consecutive season.

The Sharks' 1999–2000 regular season is remembered, in large part, for the heroics of captain Owen Nolan. Nolan, in his fourth full season with the team, posted career-best goal (44) and point (84) totals; both figures established new franchise records. Nolan's excellent play was complemented by that of fellow forwards Vincent Damphousse and Jeff Friesen; fan-favorite Mike Ricci, in his third season with the team, also turned in a quality campaign. All told, San Jose's offense improved considerably despite disappointing production from young forwards Patrick Marleau and Marco Sturm. By contrast, the Sharks' defense regressed despite quality play from starting goaltender Steve Shields, rookie goaltender Evgeni Nabokov, and defensemen Gary Suter and Brad Stuart. Still, the team finished the 1999–2000 campaign with franchise-record point (87) and win (35) totals.

The Sharks' competent play netted them the Western Conference's eighth, and final, playoff berth. In the first round, they faced the top-seeded (and heavily favored) St. Louis Blues. As expected, the Blues took the series' first game with relative ease; the Sharks shocked onlookers, however, by winning each of the next three. The Blues responded with two decisive victories of their own; in doing so, they forced a deciding seventh game in St. Louis. There, in an upset on par with their 1994 victory over the Detroit Red Wings, the Sharks scored a stunning 3–1 victory. The game is remembered, in part, for an infamous center-ice goal by Owen Nolan on Blues goaltender Roman Turek. The goal, which gave the Sharks a 2–0 lead, ultimately served as the series-winner. In the second round, the team faced the second-seeded Dallas Stars. Unlike the Blues, the defending Stanley Cup champion Stars made quick work of the Sharks; while the latter managed to steal a game in San Jose, they were ultimately eliminated in five games.

== Regular season ==
The Sharks had the most power-play opportunities during the regular season (377) and scored the most short-handed goals (16).

=== Final standings ===
Pacific Division
No.	CR		GP	W	L	T	OTL	GF	GA	Pts
1	2	**Dallas Stars**	82	43	23	10	6	211	184	102
2	5	**Los Angeles Kings**	82	39	27	12	4	245	228	94
3	6	**Phoenix Coyotes**	82	39	31	8	4	232	228	90
4	8	**San Jose Sharks**	82	35	30	10	7	225	214	87
5	9	Mighty Ducks of Anaheim	82	34	33	12	3	217	227	83

Note: CR = Conference rank; GP = Games played; W = Wins; L = Losses; T = Ties; OTL = Overtime loss; GF = Goals for; GA = Goals against; PIM = Penalties in minutes; Pts = Points
Bolded teams qualified for the playoffs.

Western Conference
R		Div	GP	W	L	T	OTL	GF	GA	Pts
**1**	**p – St. Louis Blues**	**CEN**	**82**	**51**	**19**	**11**	**1**	**248**	**165**	**114**
**2**	**y – Dallas Stars**	**PAC**	**82**	**43**	**23**	**10**	**6**	**211**	**184**	**102**
**3**	**y – Colorado Avalanche**	**NW**	**82**	**42**	**28**	**11**	**1**	**233**	**201**	**96**
**4**	**Detroit Red Wings**	**CEN**	**82**	**48**	**22**	**10**	**2**	**278**	**210**	**108**
**5**	**Los Angeles Kings**	**PAC**	**82**	**39**	**27**	**12**	**4**	**245**	**228**	**94**
**6**	**Phoenix Coyotes**	**PAC**	**82**	**39**	**31**	**8**	**4**	**232**	**228**	**90**
**7**	**Edmonton Oilers**	**NW**	**82**	**32**	**26**	**16**	**8**	**226**	**212**	**88**
**8**	**San Jose Sharks**	**PAC**	**82**	**35**	**30**	**10**	**7**	**225**	**214**	**87**
8.5
9	Mighty Ducks of Anaheim	PAC	82	34	33	12	3	217	227	83
10	Vancouver Canucks	NW	82	30	29	15	8	227	237	83
11	Chicago Blackhawks	CEN	82	33	37	10	2	242	245	78
12	Calgary Flames	NW	82	31	36	10	5	211	256	77
13	Nashville Predators	CEN	82	28	40	7	7	199	240	70

Divisions: CEN – Central, PAC – Pacific, NW – Northwest

bold – Qualified for playoffs; p – Won Presidents' Trophy; y – Won division

== Schedule and results ==
=== Regular season ===
1999–2000 regular season
October: 9–5–1–0 (home: 5–2–1–0; road: 4–3–0–0)

Game	Date	Score	Opponent	Record	Recap
1	October 2, 1999	5–3	Calgary Flames (1999–2000)	1–0–0–0	W
2	October 4, 1999	7–1	Chicago Blackhawks (1999–2000)	2–0–0–0	W
3	October 7, 1999	3–2 OT	Edmonton Oilers (1999–2000)	3–0–0–0	W
4	October 9, 1999	2–3	Dallas Stars (1999–2000)	3–1–0–0	L
5	October 11, 1999	3–5	@ Mighty Ducks of Anaheim (1999–2000)	3–2–0–0	L
6	October 13, 1999	2–0	@ Dallas Stars (1999–2000)	4–2–0–0	W
7	October 14, 1999	5–1	@ Nashville Predators (1999–2000)	5–2–0–0	W
8	October 16, 1999	3–2	@ Washington Capitals (1999–2000)	6–2–0–0	W
9	October 19, 1999	2–1	@ New York Rangers (1999–2000)	7–2–0–0	W
10	October 20, 1999	3–6	@ Detroit Red Wings (1999–2000)	7–3–0–0	L
11	October 23, 1999	1–3	Boston Bruins (1999–2000)	7–4–0–0	L
12	October 24, 1999	3–4	@ Los Angeles Kings (1999–2000)	7–5–0–0	L
13	October 28, 1999	3–2	Nashville Predators (1999–2000)	8–5–0–0	W
14	October 30, 1999	1–1 OT	Pittsburgh Penguins (1999–2000)	8–5–1–0	T
15	October 31, 1999	2–1	Washington Capitals (1999–2000)	9–5–1–0	W

November: 5–4–2–2 (home: 3–1–0–1; road: 2–3–2–1)

Game	Date	Score	Opponent	Record	Recap
16	November 3, 1999	6–3	Phoenix Coyotes (1999–2000)	10–5–1–0	W
17	November 5, 1999	1–3	Philadelphia Flyers (1999–2000)	10–6–1–0	L
18	November 6, 1999	2–1	Dallas Stars (1999–2000)	11–6–1–0	W
19	November 9, 1999	4–4 OT	@ Vancouver Canucks (1999–2000)	11–6–2–0	T
20	November 10, 1999	3–4 OT	@ Calgary Flames (1999–2000)	11–6–2–1	L
21	November 13, 1999	2–3	@ Philadelphia Flyers (1999–2000)	11–7–2–1	OTL
22	November 15, 1999	2–4	@ Toronto Maple Leafs (1999–2000)	11–8–2–1	L
23	November 16, 1999	4–1	@ Montreal Canadiens (1999–2000)	12–8–2–1	W
24	November 18, 1999	4–1	@ Ottawa Senators (1999–2000)	13–8–2–1	W
25	November 20, 1999	1–1 OT	@ St. Louis Blues (1999–2000)	13–8–3–1	T
26	November 23, 1999	2–3 OT	Montreal Canadiens (1999–2000)	13–8–3–2	OTL
27	November 27, 1999	1–4	@ Los Angeles Kings (1999–2000)	13–9–3–2	L
28	November 28, 1999	4–3 OT	New Jersey Devils (1999–2000)	14–9–3–2	W

December: 5–6–1–1 (home: 3–3–1–0; road: 2–3–0–1)

Game	Date	Score	Opponent	Record	Recap
29	December 1, 1999	2–4	@ Detroit Red Wings (1999–2000)	14–10–3–2	L
30	December 2, 1999	5–2	@ Pittsburgh Penguins (1999–2000)	15–10–3–2	W
31	December 4, 1999	2–4	@ St. Louis Blues (1999–2000)	15–11–3–2	L
32	December 6, 1999	3–3 OT	Tampa Bay Lightning (1999–2000)	15–11–4–2	T
33	December 8, 1999	4–2	Colorado Avalanche (1999–2000)	16–11–4–2	W
34	December 10, 1999	4–1	Atlanta Thrashers (1999–2000)	17–11–4–2	W
35	December 14, 1999	2–5	Chicago Blackhawks (1999–2000)	17–12–4–2	L
36	December 19, 1999	3–4	@ Phoenix Coyotes (1999–2000)	17–13–4–2	L
37	December 20, 1999	3–4	Detroit Red Wings (1999–2000)	17–14–4–2	L
38	December 22, 1999	2–1	Los Angeles Kings (1999–2000)	18–14–4–2	W
39	December 26, 1999	0–1	Mighty Ducks of Anaheim (1999–2000)	18–15–4–2	L
40	December 27, 1999	3–1	@ Dallas Stars (1999–2000)	19–15–4–2	W
41	December 30, 1999	1–2 OT	@ St. Louis Blues (1999–2000)	19–15–4–3	OTL

January: 3–5–2–3 (home: 2–3–0–1; road: 1–2–2–2)

Game	Date	Score	Opponent	Record	Recap
42	January 1, 2000	2–3	@ Nashville Predators (1999–2000)	19–16–4–3	L
43	January 2, 2000	4–1	@ Chicago Blackhawks (1999–2000)	20–16–4–3	W
44	January 5, 2000	1–1 OT	@ Edmonton Oilers (1999–2000)	20–16–5–3	T
45	January 8, 2000	2–4	Florida Panthers (1999–2000)	20–17–5–3	L
46	January 11, 2000	2–5	St. Louis Blues (1999–2000)	20–18–5–3	L
47	January 15, 2000	3–2 OT	Los Angeles Kings (1999–2000)	21–18–5–3	W
48	January 17, 2000	4–5 OT	@ Chicago Blackhawks (1999–2000)	21–18–5–4	OTL
49	January 19, 2000	0–0 OT	@ Colorado Avalanche (1999–2000)	21–18–6–4	T
50	January 22, 2000	4–3	Mighty Ducks of Anaheim (1999–2000)	22–18–6–4	W
51	January 23, 2000	2–3 OT	@ Phoenix Coyotes (1999–2000)	22–18–6–5	OTL
52	January 25, 2000	3–4	Colorado Avalanche (1999–2000)	22–19–6–5	L
53	January 28, 2000	1–4	@ Vancouver Canucks (1999–2000)	22–20–6–5	L
54	January 29, 2000	2–3 OT	New York Islanders (1999–2000)	22–20–6–6	OTL

February: 4–4–2–1 (home: 1–2–0–1; road: 3–2–2–0)

Game	Date	Score	Opponent	Record	Recap
55	February 1, 2000	0–1 OT	Phoenix Coyotes (1999–2000)	22–20–6–7	OTL
56	February 3, 2000	3–3 OT	@ Colorado Avalanche (1999–2000)	22–20–7–7	T
57	February 8, 2000	8–0	@ Tampa Bay Lightning (1999–2000)	23–20–7–7	W
58	February 9, 2000	1–4	@ Florida Panthers (1999–2000)	23–21–7–7	L
59	February 11, 2000	3–0	@ Atlanta Thrashers (1999–2000)	24–21–7–7	W
60	February 13, 2000	1–3	@ New Jersey Devils (1999–2000)	24–22–7–7	L
61	February 15, 2000	4–1	@ New York Islanders (1999–2000)	25–22–7–7	W
62	February 18, 2000	4–4 OT	@ Mighty Ducks of Anaheim (1999–2000)	25–22–8–7	T
63	February 23, 2000	1–4	St. Louis Blues (1999–2000)	25–23–8–7	L
64	February 26, 2000	6–3	Los Angeles Kings (1999–2000)	26–23–8–7	W
65	February 29, 2000	2–4	Mighty Ducks of Anaheim (1999–2000)	26–24–8–7	L

March: 6–4–2–0 (home: 6–2–1–0; road: 0–2–1–0)

Game	Date	Score	Opponent	Record	Recap
66	March 2, 2000	4–3	Nashville Predators (1999–2000)	27–24–8–7	W
67	March 4, 2000	2–5	Carolina Hurricanes (1999–2000)	27–25–8–7	L
68	March 6, 2000	2–1	New York Rangers (1999–2000)	28–25–8–7	W
69	March 8, 2000	1–1 OT	Detroit Red Wings (1999–2000)	28–25–9–7	T
70	March 13, 2000	5–3	Calgary Flames (1999–2000)	29–25–9–7	W
71	March 15, 2000	6–5 OT	Buffalo Sabres (1999–2000)	30–25–9–7	W
72	March 17, 2000	2–4	@ Mighty Ducks of Anaheim (1999–2000)	30–26–9–7	L
73	March 19, 2000	3–5	@ Dallas Stars (1999–2000)	30–27–9–7	L
74	March 22, 2000	4–3	Vancouver Canucks (1999–2000)	31–27–9–7	W
75	March 24, 2000	5–1	Phoenix Coyotes (1999–2000)	32–27–9–7	W
76	March 27, 2000	1–2	Edmonton Oilers (1999–2000)	32–28–9–7	L
77	March 29, 2000	1–1 OT	@ Los Angeles Kings (1999–2000)	32–28–10–7	T

April: 3–2–0–0 (home: 1–1–0–0; road: 2–1–0–0)

Game	Date	Score	Opponent	Record	Recap
78	April 1, 2000	0–3	@ Calgary Flames (1999–2000)	32–29–10–7	L
79	April 3, 2000	1–0	@ Edmonton Oilers (1999–2000)	33–29–10–7	W
80	April 5, 2000	5–2	Dallas Stars (1999–2000)	34–29–10–7	W
81	April 7, 2000	3–1	@ Phoenix Coyotes (1999–2000)	35–29–10–7	W
82	April 9, 2000	2–5	Vancouver Canucks (1999–2000)	35–30–10–7	L

Legend: W Win (2 points) L Loss (0 points) T Tie (1 point) OTL Overtime loss (1 point)

=== Playoffs ===
2000 Stanley Cup playoffs
Western Conference Quarterfinals vs. (1) St. Louis Blues: Sharks win 4–3

Game	Date	Score	Opponent	Series	Recap
1	April 12, 2000	3–5	@ St. Louis Blues	Blues lead 1–0	L
2	April 15, 2000	4–2	@ St. Louis Blues	Series tied 1–1	W
3	April 17, 2000	2–1	St. Louis Blues	Sharks lead 2–1	W
4	April 19, 2000	3–2	St. Louis Blues	Sharks lead 3–1	W
5	April 21, 2000	3–5	@ St. Louis Blues	Sharks lead 3–2	L
6	April 23, 2000	2–6	St. Louis Blues	Series tied 3–3	L
7	April 25, 2000	3–1	@ St. Louis Blues	Sharks win 4–3	W

Western Conference Semifinals vs. (2) Dallas Stars: Stars win 4–1

Game	Date	Score	Opponent	Series	Recap
1	April 28, 2000	0–4	@ Dallas Stars	Stars lead 1–0	L
2	April 30, 2000	0–1	@ Dallas Stars	Stars lead 2–0	L
3	May 2, 2000	2–1	Dallas Stars	Stars lead 2–1	W
4	May 5, 2000	4–5	Dallas Stars	Stars lead 3–1	L
5	May 7, 2000	1–4	@ Dallas Stars	Stars win 4–1	L

Legend: W Win L Loss

== Player statistics ==
=== Scoring ===
- Position abbreviations: C = Center; D = Defense; G = Goaltender; LW = Left wing; RW = Right wing
- † = Joined team via a transaction (e.g., trade, waivers, signing) during the season. Stats reflect time with the Sharks only.
- ‡ = Left team via a transaction (e.g., trade, waivers, release) during the season. Stats reflect time with the Sharks only.

No.	Player	Pos	Regular season						Playoffs					
No.	Player	Pos	GP	G	A	Pts	+/-	PIM	GP	G	A	Pts	+/-	PIM
11	Owen Nolan	RW	78	44	40	84	−1	110	10	8	2	10	−2	6
25	Vincent Damphousse	C	82	21	49	70	4	58	12	1	7	8	−5	16
39	Jeff Friesen	LW	82	26	35	61	−2	47	11	2	2	4	−4	10
18	Mike Ricci	C	82	20	24	44	14	60	12	5	1	6	−3	2
14	Patrick Marleau	C	81	17	23	40	−9	36	5	1	1	2	−3	2
24	Niklas Sundstrom	RW	79	12	25	37	9	22	12	0	2	2	−3	2
7	Brad Stuart	D	82	10	26	36	3	32	12	1	0	1	−11	6
15	Alexander Korolyuk	LW	57	14	21	35	4	35	9	0	3	3	1	6
20	Gary Suter	D	76	6	28	34	7	52	12	2	5	7	−6	12
19	Marco Sturm	LW	74	12	15	27	4	22	12	1	3	4	0	6
32 (Note: Matteau wore number 37 through January 11.)	Stephane Matteau	LW	69	12	12	24	−3	61	10	0	2	2	−2	8
5	Jeff Norton	D	62	0	20	20	−2	49	12	0	1	1	−3	7
10	Marcus Ragnarsson	D	63	3	13	16	13	38	12	0	3	3	3	10
40	Mike Rathje	D	66	2	14	16	−2	31	12	1	3	4	1	8
21	Tony Granato	RW	48	6	7	13	2	39	12	0	1	1	1	14
9	Todd Harvey†	RW	40	8	4	12	−2	78	12	1	0	1	−2	8
12	Ron Sutter	C	78	5	6	11	−3	34	12	0	2	2	0	10
22	Ron Stern	RW	67	4	5	9	−9	151	3	1	0	1	−2	11
26	Dave Lowry	LW	32	1	4	5	1	18	12	1	2	3	0	6
27	Bryan Marchment	D	49	0	4	4	3	72	11	2	1	3	2	12
43	Scott Hannan	D	30	1	2	3	7	10	12	0	1	1	1	14
42	Andy Sutton	D	40	1	1	2	−5	80	—	—	—	—	—	—
32	Murray Craven‡	LW	19	0	2	2	−2	4	—	—	—	—	—	—
33	Brantt Myhres	RW	13	0	1	1	0	97	—	—	—	—	—	—
3	Bob Rouse‡	D	26	0	1	1	−3	19	—	—	—	—	—	—
31	Steve Shields	G	67	0	1	1		29	12	0	0	0		0
23	Shawn Heins	D	1	0	0	0	−1	2	—	—	—	—	—	—
35	Evgeni Nabokov	G	11	0	0	0		0	1	0	0	0		0
29	Mike Vernon‡	G	15	0	0	0		0	—	—	—	—	—	—

=== Goaltending ===
- ‡ = Left team via a transaction (e.g., trade, waivers, release) during the season. Stats reflect time with the Sharks only.

No.	Player	Regular season										Playoffs								
No.	Player	GP	W	L	T	SA	GA	GAA	SV%	SO	TOI	GP	W	L	SA	GA	GAA	SV%	SO	TOI
31	Steve Shields	67	27	30	8	1826	162	2.56	.911	4	3797	12	5	7	323	36	3.10	.889	0	696
29	Mike Vernon‡	15	6	5	1	360	32	2.49	.911	0	772	—	—	—	—	—	—	—	—	—
35	Evgeni Nabokov	11	2	2	1	166	15	2.17	.910	1	414	1	0	0	10	0	0.00	1.000	0	20

== Awards and records ==
=== Awards ===
Type	Award/honor	Recipient	Ref
League (annual)	NHL All-Rookie Team	Brad Stuart (Defense)	
League (in-season)	NHL All-Star Game selection	Owen Nolan	
League (in-season)	NHL Player of the Week	Steve Shields (October 18)	
League (in-season)	NHL Player of the Week	Owen Nolan (December 13)	
Team	Sharks Player of the Year	Owen Nolan	
Team	Sharks Rookie of the Year	Brad Stuart	

=== Milestones ===
Milestone	Player	Date	Ref
First game	Brad Stuart	October 2, 1999	
First game	Evgeni Nabokov	January 1, 2000	
1,000th game played	Ron Sutter	October 16, 1999	
600th assist	Vincent Damphousse	November 27, 1999	

== Draft picks ==
San Jose's draft picks at the 1999 NHL entry draft held at the FleetCenter in Boston, Massachusetts.

Round	#	Player	Position	Nationality	College/Junior/Club team
1	14	Jeff Jillson	Defense	United States	University of Michigan
3	82	Marc Concannon	Left wing	United States	The Winchendon School
4	111	Willie Levesque	Right wing	United States	Northeastern University
5	155	Niko Dimitrakos	Right wing	United States	University of Maine
8	229	Eric Betournay	Center	Canada	Acadie-Bathurst Titan
8	241	Douglas Murray	Defense	Sweden	New York Apple Core
9	257	Hannes Hyvonen	Right wing	Finland	TPS

== See also ==
- 1999–2000 NHL season
