= 1999–2000 Chicago Blackhawks season =

National Hockey League team season

1999–2000 Chicago Blackhawks
- Division: 3rd Central
- Conference: 11th Western
- 1999–2000 record: 33–37–10–2
- Home record: 16–19–5–1
- Road record: 17–18–5–1
- Goals for: 242
- Goals against: 245

Team information
- General manager: Bob Murray (Oct.–Dec.); Bob Pulford (Dec.–Apr.)
- Coach: Lorne Molleken (Oct.–Dec.); Bob Pulford (Dec.–Apr.)
- Captain: Doug Gilmour (Oct.–Mar.); Vacant (Mar.–Apr.)
- Arena: United Center
- Average attendance: 16,274
- Minor league affiliates: Cleveland Lumberjacks; Hampton Roads Admirals

Team leaders
- Goals: Tony Amonte (43)
- Assists: Steve Sullivan (42)
- Points: Tony Amonte (84)
- Penalty minutes: Ryan VandenBussche (143)
- Plus/minus: Steve Sullivan (+20)
- Wins: Jocelyn Thibault (25)
- Goals against average: Steve Passmore (2.72)

The 1999–2000 Chicago Blackhawks season was the Chicago Blackhawks' 74th season of operation. Finishing 11th in the Western Conference, they did not qualify for the playoffs.

== Offseason ==
Forward Doug Gilmour was named team captain.

== Regular season ==
The Blackhawks tied the Atlanta Thrashers for the most short-handed goals allowed during the regular season, with 13. Captain Doug Gilmour was traded in March to the Buffalo Sabres. The team completed the season without a captain.

=== Final standings ===
Central Division
No.	CR		GP	W	L	T	OTL	GF	GA	Pts
1	1	**St. Louis Blues**	82	51	19	11	1	248	165	114
2	4	**Detroit Red Wings**	82	48	22	10	2	278	210	108
3	11	Chicago Blackhawks	82	33	37	10	2	242	245	78
4	13	Nashville Predators	82	28	40	7	7	199	240	70

Note: CR = Conference rank; GP = Games played; W = Wins; L = Losses; T = Ties; OTL = Overtime loss; GF = Goals for; GA = Goals against; PIM = Penalties in minutes; Pts = Points
Bolded teams qualified for the playoffs.

Western Conference
R		Div	GP	W	L	T	OTL	GF	GA	Pts
**1**	**p – St. Louis Blues**	**CEN**	**82**	**51**	**19**	**11**	**1**	**248**	**165**	**114**
**2**	**y – Dallas Stars**	**PAC**	**82**	**43**	**23**	**10**	**6**	**211**	**184**	**102**
**3**	**y – Colorado Avalanche**	**NW**	**82**	**42**	**28**	**11**	**1**	**233**	**201**	**96**
**4**	**Detroit Red Wings**	**CEN**	**82**	**48**	**22**	**10**	**2**	**278**	**210**	**108**
**5**	**Los Angeles Kings**	**PAC**	**82**	**39**	**27**	**12**	**4**	**245**	**228**	**94**
**6**	**Phoenix Coyotes**	**PAC**	**82**	**39**	**31**	**8**	**4**	**232**	**228**	**90**
**7**	**Edmonton Oilers**	**NW**	**82**	**32**	**26**	**16**	**8**	**226**	**212**	**88**
**8**	**San Jose Sharks**	**PAC**	**82**	**35**	**30**	**10**	**7**	**225**	**214**	**87**
8.5
9	Mighty Ducks of Anaheim	PAC	82	34	33	12	3	217	227	83
10	Vancouver Canucks	NW	82	30	29	15	8	227	237	83
11	Chicago Blackhawks	CEN	82	33	37	10	2	242	245	78
12	Calgary Flames	NW	82	31	36	10	5	211	256	77
13	Nashville Predators	CEN	82	28	40	7	7	199	240	70

Divisions: CEN – Central, PAC – Pacific, NW – Northwest

bold – Qualified for playoffs; p – Won Presidents' Trophy; y – Won division

== Schedule and results ==
1999–2000 regular season
October: 2–5–4–0 (home: 0–3–3–0; road: 2–2–1–0)

Game	Date	Score	Opponent	Record	Recap
1	October 4, 1999	1–7	@ San Jose Sharks (1999–2000)	0–1–0–0	L
2	October 6, 1999	4–5	@ Vancouver Canucks (1999–2000)	0–2–0–0	L
3	October 8, 1999	3–3 OT	Phoenix Coyotes (1999–2000)	0–2–1–0	T
4	October 10, 1999	3–3 OT	Nashville Predators (1999–2000)	0–2–2–0	T
5	October 15, 1999	1–2	Toronto Maple Leafs (1999–2000)	0–3–2–0	L
6	October 16, 1999	3–3 OT	@ Pittsburgh Penguins (1999–2000)	0–3–3–0	T
7	October 21, 1999	5–5 OT	Mighty Ducks of Anaheim (1999–2000)	0–3–4–0	T
8	October 23, 1999	0–1	Detroit Red Wings (1999–2000)	0–4–4–0	L
9	October 27, 1999	1–0	@ Montreal Canadiens (1999–2000)	1–4–4–0	W
10	October 29, 1999	4–2	@ Detroit Red Wings (1999–2000)	2–4–4–0	W
11	October 30, 1999	1–3	Los Angeles Kings (1999–2000)	2–5–4–0	L

November: 3–8–0–2 (home: 1–3–0–1; road: 2–5–0–1)

Game	Date	Score	Opponent	Record	Recap
12	November 4, 1999	4–5 OT	Buffalo Sabres (1999–2000)	2–5–4–1	OTL
13	November 5, 1999	3–1	@ Nashville Predators (1999–2000)	3–5–4–1	W
14	November 7, 1999	1–3	New York Rangers (1999–2000)	3–6–4–1	L
15	November 10, 1999	2–4	Nashville Predators (1999–2000)	3–7–4–1	L
16	November 12, 1999	5–0	New York Islanders (1999–2000)	4–7–4–1	W
17	November 14, 1999	3–6	Edmonton Oilers (1999–2000)	4–8–4–1	L
18	November 16, 1999	2–3	@ Los Angeles Kings (1999–2000)	4–9–4–1	L
19	November 19, 1999	2–4	@ Mighty Ducks of Anaheim (1999–2000)	4–10–4–1	L
20	November 20, 1999	1–3	@ Phoenix Coyotes (1999–2000)	4–11–4–1	L
21	November 24, 1999	3–2	@ Edmonton Oilers (1999–2000)	5–11–4–1	W
22	November 25, 1999	1–2 OT	@ Calgary Flames (1999–2000)	5–11–4–2	OTL
23	November 27, 1999	3–8	@ St. Louis Blues (1999–2000)	5–12–4–2	L
24	November 30, 1999	1–2	@ Ottawa Senators (1999–2000)	5–13–4–2	L

December: 6–6–2–0 (home: 3–4–0–0; road: 3–2–2–0)

Game	Date	Score	Opponent	Record	Recap
25	December 3, 1999	4–7	Detroit Red Wings (1999–2000)	5–14–4–2	L
26	December 4, 1999	9–3	@ Boston Bruins (1999–2000)	6–14–4–2	W
27	December 6, 1999	5–1	Edmonton Oilers (1999–2000)	7–14–4–2	W
28	December 9, 1999	0–4	New Jersey Devils (1999–2000)	7–15–4–2	L
29	December 10, 1999	1–2	@ Buffalo Sabres (1999–2000)	7–16–4–2	L
30	December 12, 1999	1–2	Calgary Flames (1999–2000)	7–17–4–2	L
31	December 14, 1999	5–2	@ San Jose Sharks (1999–2000)	8–17–4–2	W
32	December 17, 1999	0–2	@ Mighty Ducks of Anaheim (1999–2000)	8–18–4–2	L
33	December 18, 1999	8–4	@ Los Angeles Kings (1999–2000)	9–18–4–2	W
34	December 23, 1999	5–2	Dallas Stars (1999–2000)	10–18–4–2	W
35	December 26, 1999	2–4	Pittsburgh Penguins (1999–2000)	10–19–4–2	L
36	December 27, 1999	2–2 OT	@ Washington Capitals (1999–2000)	10–19–5–2	T
37	December 30, 1999	2–1	Florida Panthers (1999–2000)	11–19–5–2	W
38	December 31, 1999	4–4 OT	@ Detroit Red Wings (1999–2000)	11–19–6–2	T

January: 7–6–0–0 (home: 5–3–0–0; road: 2–3–0–0)

Game	Date	Score	Opponent	Record	Recap
39	January 2, 2000	1–4	San Jose Sharks (1999–2000)	11–20–6–2	L
40	January 6, 2000	5–2	Calgary Flames (1999–2000)	12–20–6–2	W
41	January 8, 2000	3–6	@ Nashville Predators (1999–2000)	12–21–6–2	L
42	January 9, 2000	5–3	Colorado Avalanche (1999–2000)	13–21–6–2	W
43	January 12, 2000	3–2 OT	Vancouver Canucks (1999–2000)	14–21–6–2	W
44	January 13, 2000	5–3	@ Detroit Red Wings (1999–2000)	15–21–6–2	W
45	January 15, 2000	1–3	@ Colorado Avalanche (1999–2000)	15–22–6–2	L
46	January 17, 2000	5–4 OT	San Jose Sharks (1999–2000)	16–22–6–2	W
47	January 19, 2000	1–4	@ New Jersey Devils (1999–2000)	16–23–6–2	L
48	January 21, 2000	0–3	St. Louis Blues (1999–2000)	16–24–6–2	L
49	January 23, 2000	2–3	Dallas Stars (1999–2000)	16–25–6–2	L
50	January 27, 2000	6–4	Colorado Avalanche (1999–2000)	17–25–6–2	W
51	January 30, 2000	3–1	@ Vancouver Canucks (1999–2000)	18–25–6–2	W

February: 4–6–1–0 (home: 1–4–0–0; road: 3–2–1–0)

Game	Date	Score	Opponent	Record	Recap
52	February 2, 2000	1–4	@ Edmonton Oilers (1999–2000)	18–26–6–2	L
53	February 3, 2000	5–5 OT	@ Calgary Flames (1999–2000)	18–26–7–2	T
54	February 12, 2000	4–3	@ Atlanta Thrashers (1999–2000)	19–26–7–2	W
55	February 14, 2000	3–4	Mighty Ducks of Anaheim (1999–2000)	19–27–7–2	L
56	February 16, 2000	1–4	Los Angeles Kings (1999–2000)	19–28–7–2	L
57	February 18, 2000	4–5	Washington Capitals (1999–2000)	19–29–7–2	L
58	February 20, 2000	6–4	Detroit Red Wings (1999–2000)	20–29–7–2	W
59	February 22, 2000	1–3	@ Philadelphia Flyers (1999–2000)	20–30–7–2	L
60	February 23, 2000	2–4	Nashville Predators (1999–2000)	20–31–7–2	L
61	February 25, 2000	4–3 OT	@ Dallas Stars (1999–2000)	21–31–7–2	W
62	February 27, 2000	4–1	@ St. Louis Blues (1999–2000)	22–31–7–2	W

March: 8–5–2–0 (home: 4–1–2–0; road: 4–4–0–0)

Game	Date	Score	Opponent	Record	Recap
63	March 1, 2000	1–4	Montreal Canadiens (1999–2000)	22–32–7–2	L
64	March 3, 2000	5–1	Tampa Bay Lightning (1999–2000)	23–32–7–2	W
65	March 5, 2000	7–3	Phoenix Coyotes (1999–2000)	24–32–7–2	W
66	March 7, 2000	1–3	@ Nashville Predators (1999–2000)	24–33–7–2	L
67	March 8, 2000	1–4	@ Carolina Hurricanes (1999–2000)	24–34–7–2	L
68	March 11, 2000	5–2	@ Florida Panthers (1999–2000)	25–34–7–2	W
69	March 12, 2000	4–1	@ Tampa Bay Lightning (1999–2000)	26–34–7–2	W
70	March 15, 2000	5–2	@ Toronto Maple Leafs (1999–2000)	27–34–7–2	W
71	March 16, 2000	5–4 OT	Boston Bruins (1999–2000)	28–34–7–2	W
72	March 18, 2000	2–2 OT	Dallas Stars (1999–2000)	28–34–8–2	T
73	March 21, 2000	3–0	@ Phoenix Coyotes (1999–2000)	29–34–8–2	W
74	March 24, 2000	1–5	@ Dallas Stars (1999–2000)	29–35–8–2	L
75	March 26, 2000	1–1 OT	St. Louis Blues (1999–2000)	29–35–9–2	T
76	March 27, 2000	1–3	@ Colorado Avalanche (1999–2000)	29–36–9–2	L
77	March 30, 2000	4–0	Toronto Maple Leafs (1999–2000)	30–36–9–2	W

April: 3–1–1–0 (home: 2–1–0–0; road: 1–0–1–0)

Game	Date	Score	Opponent	Record	Recap
78	April 1, 2000	2–2 OT	@ New York Islanders (1999–2000)	30–36–10–2	T
79	April 2, 2000	2–3	Vancouver Canucks (1999–2000)	30–37–10–2	L
80	April 5, 2000	5–2	Mighty Ducks of Anaheim (1999–2000)	31–37–10–2	W
81	April 7, 2000	4–3 OT	@ St. Louis Blues (1999–2000)	32–37–10–2	W
82	April 9, 2000	3–1	St. Louis Blues (1999–2000)	33–37–10–2	W

Legend: W Win (2 points) L Loss (0 points) T Tie (1 point) OTL Overtime loss (1 point)

== Player statistics ==
=== Scoring ===
- Position abbreviations: C = Center; D = Defense; G = Goaltender; LW = Left wing; RW = Right wing
- † = Joined team via a transaction (e.g., trade, waivers, signing) during the season. Stats reflect time with the Blackhawks only.
- ‡ = Left team via a transaction (e.g., trade, waivers, release) during the season. Stats reflect time with the Blackhawks only.

No.	Player	Pos	Regular season					
No.	Player	Pos	GP	G	A	Pts	+/-	PIM
10	Tony Amonte	RW	82	43	41	84	10	48
26 (Note: Sullivan wore number 15 through December 12.)	Steve Sullivan†	RW	73	22	42	64	20	52
13	Alexei Zhamnov	C	71	23	37	60	7	61
93	Doug Gilmour‡	C	63	22	34	56	−12	51
92 (Note: Nylander wore number 37 in his first game.)	Michael Nylander†	C	66	23	28	51	9	26
2	Boris Mironov	D	58	9	28	37	−3	72
55	Eric Daze	RW	59	23	13	36	−16	28
19	Dean McAmmond	C	76	14	18	32	11	72
8	Anders Eriksson	D	73	3	25	28	4	20
44	Bryan McCabe	D	79	6	19	25	−8	139
6	Sylvain Cote†‡	D	45	6	18	24	−4	14
11	Josef Marha	C	81	10	12	22	−10	18
17 (Note: Dumont wore number 12 through December 18.)	Jean-Pierre Dumont‡	RW	47	10	8	18	−6	18
24	Bob Probert	LW	69	4	11	15	10	114
34	Blair Atcheynum	RW	47	5	7	12	−8	6
6	Kevin Dean†	D	27	2	8	10	9	12
4	Doug Zmolek	D	43	2	7	9	6	60
3 (Note: Brown wore number 2 in his first twelve games.)	Brad Brown	D	57	0	9	9	−1	134
23	Jean-Yves Leroux	LW	54	3	5	8	−10	43
22	Dave Manson‡	D	37	0	7	7	2	40
17	Michal Grosek†	LW	14	2	4	6	−1	12
20	Mark Janssens	C	36	0	6	6	−2	73
37	Bryan Muir‡	D	11	2	3	5	−1	13
16	Ed Olczyk	C	33	2	2	4	−8	12
33 (Note: Allison wore number 38 through December 17.)	Jamie Allison	D	59	1	3	4	−5	102
32	Radim Bicanek	D	11	0	3	3	7	4
17	Wendel Clark‡	LW	13	2	0	2	−2	13
25	Kyle Calder	LW	8	1	1	2	−3	2
5	Steve McCarthy	D	5	1	1	2	0	4
12	Derek Plante†	C	17	1	1	2	−1	2
14	Ryan VandenBussche	RW	52	0	1	1	−3	143
36	Chris Herperger	C	9	0	0	0	−2	5
31	Marc Lamothe	G	2	0	0	0		0
29	Steve Passmore	G	24	0	0	0		9
41	Jocelyn Thibault	G	60	0	0	0		2
26	Todd White‡	C	1	0	0	0	0	0

=== Goaltending ===
No.	Player	Regular season									
No.	Player	GP	W	L	T	SA	GA	GAA	SV%	SO	TOI
41	Jocelyn Thibault	60	25	26	7	1679	158	2.76	.906	3	3438
29	Steve Passmore	24	7	12	3	654	63	2.72	.904	1	1388
31	Marc Lamothe	2	1	1	0	50	10	5.17	.800	0	116

== Awards and records ==
=== Awards ===
Type	Award/honor	Recipient	Ref
League (in-season)	NHL All-Star Game selection	Tony Amonte	

=== Milestones ===
Milestone	Player	Date	Ref
First game	Steve McCarthy	October 4, 1999	
First game	Chris Herperger	October 6, 1999	
First game	Kyle Calder	October 21, 1999	
First game	Marc Lamothe	November 27, 1999	
1,000th game played	Eddie Olczyk	October 8, 1999	
400th goal	Doug Gilmour	October 29, 1999	
1,000th game played	Sylvain Cote	January 23, 2000	

== Draft picks ==
Chicago's draft picks at the 1999 NHL entry draft held at the FleetCenter in Boston, Massachusetts.

Round	#	Player	Nationality	College/Junior/Club team (League)
1	23	Steve McCarthy	Canada	Kootenay Ice (WHL)
2	46	Dmitri Levinsky	Kazakhstan	Severstal Cherepovets (Russia)
2	63	Stepan Mokhov	Kazakhstan	Severstal Cherepovets (Russia)
5	134	Michael Jacobsen	Canada	Belleville Bulls (OHL)
6	165	Michael Leighton	Canada	Windsor Spitfires (OHL)
7	194	Mattias Wennerberg	Sweden	MODO Jr. (Sweden)
7	195	Yorick Treille	France	University of Massachusetts Lowell (NCAA)

== See also ==
- 1999–2000 NHL season
