= 1999–2000 Detroit Red Wings season =

Sports season

1999–2000 Detroit Red Wings
- Division: 2nd Central
- Conference: 4th Western
- 1999–2000 record: 48–22–10–2
- Home record: 28–9–3–1
- Road record: 20–13–7–1
- Goals for: 278
- Goals against: 210

Team information
- General manager: Ken Holland
- Coach: Scotty Bowman
- Captain: Steve Yzerman
- Alternate captains: Nicklas Lidstrom; Brendan Shanahan
- Arena: Joe Louis Arena
- Average attendance: 19,983
- Minor league affiliates: Cincinnati Mighty Ducks; Louisiana IceGators

Team leaders
- Goals: Brendan Shanahan (41)
- Assists: Nicklas Lidstrom (53)
- Points: Steve Yzerman (79)
- Penalty minutes: Martin Lapointe (121)
- Plus/minus: Chris Chelios (+48)
- Wins: Chris Osgood (30)
- Goals against average: Chris Osgood (2.40)

The 1999–2000 Detroit Red Wings season was Detroit's 74th season of operation in the National Hockey League (NHL).

== Regular season ==
The Red Wings led in goals for during the regular season, with 278. They also finished first in power-play goals scored, with 69 (tied with the Philadelphia Flyers) and power-play percentage (20.41%).

=== Final standings ===
Central Division
No.	CR		GP	W	L	T	OTL	GF	GA	Pts
1	1	**St. Louis Blues**	82	51	19	11	1	248	165	114
2	4	**Detroit Red Wings**	82	48	22	10	2	278	210	108
3	11	Chicago Blackhawks	82	33	37	10	2	242	245	78
4	13	Nashville Predators	82	28	40	7	7	199	240	70

Note: CR = Conference rank; GP = Games played; W = Wins; L = Losses; T = Ties; OTL = Overtime loss; GF = Goals for; GA = Goals against; PIM = Penalties in minutes; Pts = Points
Bolded teams qualified for the playoffs.

Western Conference
R		Div	GP	W	L	T	OTL	GF	GA	Pts
**1**	**p – St. Louis Blues**	**CEN**	**82**	**51**	**19**	**11**	**1**	**248**	**165**	**114**
**2**	**y – Dallas Stars**	**PAC**	**82**	**43**	**23**	**10**	**6**	**211**	**184**	**102**
**3**	**y – Colorado Avalanche**	**NW**	**82**	**42**	**28**	**11**	**1**	**233**	**201**	**96**
**4**	**Detroit Red Wings**	**CEN**	**82**	**48**	**22**	**10**	**2**	**278**	**210**	**108**
**5**	**Los Angeles Kings**	**PAC**	**82**	**39**	**27**	**12**	**4**	**245**	**228**	**94**
**6**	**Phoenix Coyotes**	**PAC**	**82**	**39**	**31**	**8**	**4**	**232**	**228**	**90**
**7**	**Edmonton Oilers**	**NW**	**82**	**32**	**26**	**16**	**8**	**226**	**212**	**88**
**8**	**San Jose Sharks**	**PAC**	**82**	**35**	**30**	**10**	**7**	**225**	**214**	**87**
8.5
9	Mighty Ducks of Anaheim	PAC	82	34	33	12	3	217	227	83
10	Vancouver Canucks	NW	82	30	29	15	8	227	237	83
11	Chicago Blackhawks	CEN	82	33	37	10	2	242	245	78
12	Calgary Flames	NW	82	31	36	10	5	211	256	77
13	Nashville Predators	CEN	82	28	40	7	7	199	240	70

Divisions: CEN – Central, PAC – Pacific, NW – Northwest

bold – Qualified for playoffs; p – Won Presidents' Trophy; y – Won division

== Schedule and results ==
=== Regular season ===
1999–2000 regular season
October: 7–2–1–1 (home: 5–2–0–0; road: 2–0–1–1)

Game	Date	Score	Opponent	Record	Recap
1	October 2, 1999	2–0	Buffalo Sabres (1999–2000)	1–0–0–0	W
2	October 5, 1999	2–3	Dallas Stars (1999–2000)	1–1–0–0	L
3	October 7, 1999	7–1	@ Atlanta Thrashers (1999–2000)	2–1–0–0	W
4	October 9, 1999	2–2 OT	@ Florida Panthers (1999–2000)	2–1–1–0	T
5	October 13, 1999	4–2	St. Louis Blues (1999–2000)	3–1–1–0	W
6	October 16, 1999	3–2	Philadelphia Flyers (1999–2000)	4–1–1–0	W
7	October 20, 1999	6–3	San Jose Sharks (1999–2000)	5–1–1–0	W
8	October 23, 1999	1–0	@ Chicago Blackhawks (1999–2000)	6–1–1–0	W
9	October 27, 1999	5–3	Colorado Avalanche (1999–2000)	7–1–1–0	W
10	October 29, 1999	2–4	Chicago Blackhawks (1999–2000)	7–2–1–0	L
11	October 30, 1999	4–5 OT	@ St. Louis Blues (1999–2000)	7–2–1–1	OTL

November: 7–4–2–0 (home: 5–1–1–0; road: 2–3–1–0)

Game	Date	Score	Opponent	Record	Recap
12	November 3, 1999	1–1 OT	Los Angeles Kings (1999–2000)	7–2–2–1	T
13	November 5, 1999	3–2	Carolina Hurricanes (1999–2000)	8–2–2–1	W
14	November 7, 1999	2–3	@ Tampa Bay Lightning (1999–2000)	8–3–2–1	L
15	November 10, 1999	4–2	@ Dallas Stars (1999–2000)	9–3–2–1	W
16	November 12, 1999	3–2 OT	Pittsburgh Penguins (1999–2000)	10–3–2–1	W
17	November 13, 1999	1–1 OT	@ Toronto Maple Leafs (1999–2000)	10–3–3–1	T
18	November 15, 1999	6–3	Mighty Ducks of Anaheim (1999–2000)	11–3–3–1	W
19	November 17, 1999	7–2	@ Vancouver Canucks (1999–2000)	12–3–3–1	W
20	November 19, 1999	1–3	@ Calgary Flames (1999–2000)	12–4–3–1	L
21	November 20, 1999	1–2	@ Edmonton Oilers (1999–2000)	12–5–3–1	L
22	November 24, 1999	4–2	St. Louis Blues (1999–2000)	13–5–3–1	W
23	November 26, 1999	4–2	Edmonton Oilers (1999–2000)	14–5–3–1	W
24	November 28, 1999	3–4	Phoenix Coyotes (1999–2000)	14–6–3–1	L

December: 11–2–1–0 (home: 6–0–1–0; road: 5–2–0–0)

Game	Date	Score	Opponent	Record	Recap
25	December 1, 1999	4–2	San Jose Sharks (1999–2000)	15–6–3–1	W
26	December 3, 1999	7–4	@ Chicago Blackhawks (1999–2000)	16–6–3–1	W
27	December 4, 1999	1–4	@ Nashville Predators (1999–2000)	16–7–3–1	L
28	December 8, 1999	6–3	Nashville Predators (1999–2000)	17–7–3–1	W
29	December 10, 1999	3–1	Los Angeles Kings (1999–2000)	18–7–3–1	W
30	December 11, 1999	5–4	@ Boston Bruins (1999–2000)	19–7–3–1	W
31	December 15, 1999	5–1	Edmonton Oilers (1999–2000)	20–7–3–1	W
32	December 17, 1999	5–2	Colorado Avalanche (1999–2000)	21–7–3–1	W
33	December 19, 1999	1–3	@ Mighty Ducks of Anaheim (1999–2000)	21–8–3–1	L
34	December 20, 1999	4–3	@ San Jose Sharks (1999–2000)	22–8–3–1	W
35	December 22, 1999	4–1	@ Carolina Hurricanes (1999–2000)	23–8–3–1	W
36	December 27, 1999	3–2 OT	Atlanta Thrashers (1999–2000)	24–8–3–1	W
37	December 28, 1999	7–2	@ Buffalo Sabres (1999–2000)	25–8–3–1	W
38	December 31, 1999	4–4 OT	Chicago Blackhawks (1999–2000)	25–8–4–1	T

January: 6–6–2–0 (home: 5–2–0–0; road: 1–4–2–0)

Game	Date	Score	Opponent	Record	Recap
39	January 2, 2000	3–4	@ Pittsburgh Penguins (1999–2000)	25–9–4–1	L
40	January 4, 2000	2–5	Phoenix Coyotes (1999–2000)	25–10–4–1	L
41	January 6, 2000	5–2	Nashville Predators (1999–2000)	26–10–4–1	W
42	January 8, 2000	5–3	Mighty Ducks of Anaheim (1999–2000)	27–10–4–1	W
43	January 11, 2000	0–3	@ Montreal Canadiens (1999–2000)	27–11–4–1	L
44	January 13, 2000	3–5	Chicago Blackhawks (1999–2000)	27–12–4–1	L
45	January 16, 2000	3–3 OT	@ Edmonton Oilers (1999–2000)	27–12–5–1	T
46	January 18, 2000	1–6	@ Calgary Flames (1999–2000)	27–13–5–1	L
47	January 19, 2000	3–3 OT	@ Vancouver Canucks (1999–2000)	27–13–6–1	T
48	January 22, 2000	3–2	@ Ottawa Senators (1999–2000)	28–13–6–1	W
49	January 26, 2000	4–2	Toronto Maple Leafs (1999–2000)	29–13–6–1	W
50	January 28, 2000	4–1	Calgary Flames (1999–2000)	30–13–6–1	W
51	January 29, 2000	3–1	New Jersey Devils (1999–2000)	31–13–6–1	W
52	January 31, 2000	3–5	@ Phoenix Coyotes (1999–2000)	31–14–6–1	L

February: 7–5–0–0 (home: 3–3–0–0; road: 4–2–0–0)

Game	Date	Score	Opponent	Record	Recap
53	February 3, 2000	3–6	@ Los Angeles Kings (1999–2000)	31–15–6–1	L
54	February 8, 2000	1–4	St. Louis Blues (1999–2000)	31–16–6–1	L
55	February 10, 2000	2–0	@ St. Louis Blues (1999–2000)	32–16–6–1	W
56	February 13, 2000	4–3	@ Colorado Avalanche (1999–2000)	33–16–6–1	W
57	February 14, 2000	3–1	@ Phoenix Coyotes (1999–2000)	34–16–6–1	W
58	February 16, 2000	5–2	Vancouver Canucks (1999–2000)	35–16–6–1	W
59	February 18, 2000	2–3	Los Angeles Kings (1999–2000)	35–17–6–1	L
60	February 20, 2000	4–6	@ Chicago Blackhawks (1999–2000)	35–18–6–1	L
61	February 21, 2000	2–0	@ New York Islanders (1999–2000)	36–18–6–1	W
62	February 23, 2000	2–5	Dallas Stars (1999–2000)	36–19–6–1	L
63	February 25, 2000	5–2	New York Islanders (1999–2000)	37–19–6–1	W
64	February 27, 2000	3–1	Tampa Bay Lightning (1999–2000)	38–19–6–1	W

March: 9–1–3–1 (home: 3–0–1–1; road: 6–1–2–0)

Game	Date	Score	Opponent	Record	Recap
65	March 3, 2000	2–2 OT	@ Washington Capitals (1999–2000)	38–19–7–1	T
66	March 5, 2000	5–3	@ Dallas Stars (1999–2000)	39–19–7–1	W
67	March 7, 2000	3–1	@ Los Angeles Kings (1999–2000)	40–19–7–1	W
68	March 8, 2000	1–1 OT	@ San Jose Sharks (1999–2000)	40–19–8–1	T
69	March 10, 2000	3–1	@ Nashville Predators (1999–2000)	41–19–8–1	W
70	March 14, 2000	3–2 OT	Nashville Predators (1999–2000)	42–19–8–1	W
71	March 16, 2000	3–4 OT	Toronto Maple Leafs (1999–2000)	42–19–8–2	OTL
72	March 18, 2000	4–3	@ Colorado Avalanche (1999–2000)	43–19–8–2	W
73	March 19, 2000	1–3	@ Mighty Ducks of Anaheim (1999–2000)	43–20–8–2	L
74	March 22, 2000	2–2 OT	Calgary Flames (1999–2000)	43–20–9–2	T
75	March 23, 2000	6–3	@ Nashville Predators (1999–2000)	44–20–9–2	W
76	March 26, 2000	8–2	New York Rangers (1999–2000)	45–20–9–2	W
77	March 27, 2000	6–0	@ New York Rangers (1999–2000)	46–20–9–2	W
78	March 29, 2000	6–3	Vancouver Canucks (1999–2000)	47–20–9–2	W

April: 1–2–1–0 (home: 1–1–0–0; road: 0–1–1–0)

Game	Date	Score	Opponent	Record	Recap
79	April 1, 2000	0–0 OT	@ St. Louis Blues (1999–2000)	47–20–10–2	T
80	April 2, 2000	6–5 OT	Montreal Canadiens (1999–2000)	48–20–10–2	W
81	April 7, 2000	2–4	Washington Capitals (1999–2000)	48–21–10–2	L
82	April 9, 2000	2–3	@ Colorado Avalanche (1999–2000)	48–22–10–2	L

Legend: W Win (2 points) L Loss (0 points) T Tie (1 point) OTL Overtime loss (1 point)

=== Playoffs ===
2000 Stanley Cup playoffs
Western Conference Quarterfinals: vs. (5) Los Angeles Kings — Red Wings win 4–0

Game	Date	Score	Opponent	Series	Recap
1	April 13, 2000	2–0	Los Angeles Kings	Red Wings lead 1–0	W
2	April 15, 2000	8–5	Los Angeles Kings	Red Wings lead 2–0	W
3	April 17, 2000	2–1	@ Los Angeles Kings	Red Wings lead 3–0	W
4	April 19, 2000	3–0	@ Los Angeles Kings	Red Wings win 4–0	W

Western Conference Semifinals: vs. (3) Colorado Avalanche — Avalanche win 4–1

Game	Date	Score	Opponent	Series	Recap
1	April 27, 2000	0–2	@ Colorado Avalanche	Avalanche lead 1–0	L
2	April 29, 2000	1–3	@ Colorado Avalanche	Avalanche lead 2–0	L
3	May 1, 2000	3–1	Colorado Avalanche	Avalanche lead 2–1	W
4	May 3, 2000	2–3 OT	Colorado Avalanche	Avalanche lead 3–1	L
5	May 5, 2000	2–4	@ Colorado Avalanche	Avalanche win 4–1	L

Legend: W Win L Loss

== Player statistics ==
=== Scoring ===
- Position abbreviations: C = Center; D = Defense; G = Goaltender; LW = Left wing; RW = Right wing
- † = Joined team via a transaction (e.g., trade, waivers, signing) during the season. Stats reflect time with the Red Wings only.

No.	Player	Pos	Regular season						Playoffs					
No.	Player	Pos	GP	G	A	Pts	+/-	PIM	GP	G	A	Pts	+/-	PIM
19	Steve Yzerman	C	78	35	44	79	28	34	8	0	4	4	−4	0
14	Brendan Shanahan	LW	78	41	37	78	24	105	9	3	2	5	0	10
5	Nicklas Lidstrom	D	81	20	53	73	19	18	9	2	4	6	−6	4
91	Sergei Fedorov	C	68	27	35	62	8	22	9	4	4	8	2	4
15	Pat Verbeek†	RW	68	22	26	48	22	95	9	1	1	2	−4	2
8	Igor Larionov	C	79	9	38	47	13	28	9	1	2	3	−2	6
20	Martin Lapointe	RW	82	16	25	41	17	121	9	3	1	4	−1	20
28	Steve Duchesne	D	79	10	31	41	12	42	9	0	4	4	2	10
55	Larry Murphy	D	81	10	30	40	4	45	9	2	3	5	1	2
13	Vyacheslav Kozlov	LW	72	18	18	36	11	28	8	2	1	3	−3	12
96	Tomas Holmstrom	LW	72	13	22	35	4	43	9	3	1	4	3	16
24	Chris Chelios	D	81	3	31	34	48	103	9	0	1	1	−3	8
17	Doug Brown	RW	51	10	8	18	8	12	3	0	1	1	0	0
11	Mathieu Dandenault	D	81	6	12	18	−12	20	6	0	0	0	2	2
39 (Note: Roest wore number 23 until Gill was acquired.)	Stacy Roest	C	49	7	9	16	−1	12	3	0	0	0	0	0
18	Kirk Maltby	RW	41	6	8	14	1	24	8	0	1	1	0	4
25	Darren McCarty	RW	24	6	6	12	1	48	9	0	1	1	3	12
33	Kris Draper	C	51	5	7	12	3	28	9	2	0	2	4	6
22	Yuri Butsayev	C	57	5	3	8	−6	12	—	—	—	—	—	—
2	Jiri Fischer	D	52	0	8	8	1	45	—	—	—	—	—	—
41	Brent Gilchrist	LW	24	4	2	6	1	24	6	0	0	0	−3	6
21	Darryl Laplante	C	30	0	6	6	−2	10	—	—	—	—	—	—
27	Aaron Ward	D	36	1	3	4	−4	24	3	0	0	0	0	0
44	Yan Golubovsky	D	21	1	2	3	3	8	—	—	—	—	—	—
23 (Note: Gill wore number 29 in his first game.)	Todd Gill†	D	13	2	0	2	2	15	9	0	1	1	2	4
37	Marc Rodgers	RW	21	1	1	2	−3	10	—	—	—	—	—	—
30	Chris Osgood	G	53	0	1	1		18	9	0	1	1		4
31	Ken Wregget	G	29	0	1	1		0	—	—	—	—	—	—
34	Manny Legace†	G	4	0	0	0		0	—	—	—	—	—	—
3	Jesse Wallin	D	1	0	0	0	−2	0	—	—	—	—	—	—
36	B. J. Young	RW	1	0	0	0	0	0	—	—	—	—	—	—

=== Goaltending ===
- † = Joined team via a transaction (e.g., trade, waivers, signing) during the season. Stats reflect time with the Red Wings only.

No.	Player	Regular season											Playoffs									
No.	Player	GP	GS	W	L	T	SA	GA	GAA	SV%	SO	TOI	GP	GS	W	L	SA	GA	GAA	SV%	SO	TOI
30	Chris Osgood	53	52	30	14	8	1,349	126	2.40	.907	6	3,147:32	9	9	5	4	237	18	1.97	.924	2	546:54
31	Ken Wregget	29	26	14	10	2	700	70	2.66	.900	0	1,578:43	—	—	—	—	—	—	—	—	—	—
34	Manny Legace†	4	4	4	0	0	117	11	2.75	.906	0	239:36	—	—	—	—	—	—	—	—	—	—

== Awards and records ==
=== Awards ===
Type	Award/honor	Recipient	Ref
League (annual)	Frank J. Selke Trophy	Steve Yzerman	
League (annual)	NHL First All-Star Team	Nicklas Lidstrom (Defense)	
League (annual)	NHL First All-Star Team	Brendan Shanahan (Left wing)	
League (annual)	NHL First All-Star Team	Steve Yzerman (Center)	
League (in-season)	NHL All-Star Game selection	Scotty Bowman (coach)	
League (in-season)	NHL All-Star Game selection	Chris Chelios	
League (in-season)	NHL All-Star Game selection	Nicklas Lidstrom (Note: Lidstrom, Shanahan, and Yzerman were voted to the starting lineup.)	
League (in-season)	NHL All-Star Game selection	Brendan Shanahan	
League (in-season)	NHL All-Star Game selection	Steve Yzerman	

=== Milestones ===
Milestone	Player	Date	Ref
First game	Yuri Butsayev	October 2, 1999	
First game	Marc Rodgers	October 5, 1999	
First game	Jiri Fischer	October 13, 1999	
First game	B. J. Young	November 28, 1999	
First game	Jesse Wallin	April 9, 2000	
25th shutout	Chris Osgood	October 23, 1999	
400th goal	Brendan Shanahan	November 13, 1999	
1,000th point	Pat Verbeek	February 27, 2000	

== Draft picks ==
Detroit's draft picks at the 1999 NHL entry draft held at the FleetCenter in Boston, Massachusetts.

Round	#	Player	Nationality	College/Junior/Club team (League)
4	120	Jari Tolsa	Sweden	Frolunda HC Jr. (Sweden)
5	149	Andrei Maximenko	Russia	Krylya Sovetov (Russia)
6	181	Kent McDonell	Canada	Guelph Storm (OHL)
7	210	Henrik Zetterberg	Sweden	Timra IK (Sweden)
8	238	Anton Borodkin	Russia	Kamloops Blazers (WHL)
9	266	Ken Davis	Canada	Portland Winter Hawks (WHL)

== See also ==
- 1999–2000 NHL season
