= 1999–2000 Nashville Predators season =

Professional ice hockey team season

1999–2000 Nashville Predators
- Division: 4th Central
- Conference: 13th Western
- 1999–2000 record: 28–40–7–7
- Home record: 15–21–3–2
- Road record: 13–19–4–5
- Goals for: 199
- Goals against: 240

Team information
- General manager: David Poile
- Coach: Barry Trotz
- Captain: Tom Fitzgerald
- Arena: Gaylord Entertainment Center
- Average attendance: 16,599
- Minor league affiliates: Milwaukee Admirals; Hampton Roads Admirals

Team leaders
- Goals: Cliff Ronning (26)
- Assists: Cliff Ronning (36)
- Points: Cliff Ronning (62)
- Penalty minutes: Bob Boughner (97)
- Plus/minus: Vitali Yachmenev (+5)
- Wins: Mike Dunham (19)
- Goals against average: Tomas Vokoun (2.78)

The 1999–2000 Nashville Predators season was the Nashville Predators' second season in the National Hockey League (NHL). The Predators failed to qualify for the playoffs for the second year in a row.

== Regular season ==
=== Final standings ===
Central Division
No.	CR		GP	W	L	T	OTL	GF	GA	Pts
1	1	**St. Louis Blues**	82	51	19	11	1	248	165	114
2	4	**Detroit Red Wings**	82	48	22	10	2	278	210	108
3	11	Chicago Blackhawks	82	33	37	10	2	242	245	78
4	13	Nashville Predators	82	28	40	7	7	199	240	70

Note: CR = Conference rank; GP = Games played; W = Wins; L = Losses; T = Ties; OTL = Overtime loss; GF = Goals for; GA = Goals against; PIM = Penalties in minutes; Pts = Points
Bolded teams qualified for the playoffs.

Western Conference
R		Div	GP	W	L	T	OTL	GF	GA	Pts
**1**	**p – St. Louis Blues**	**CEN**	**82**	**51**	**19**	**11**	**1**	**248**	**165**	**114**
**2**	**y – Dallas Stars**	**PAC**	**82**	**43**	**23**	**10**	**6**	**211**	**184**	**102**
**3**	**y – Colorado Avalanche**	**NW**	**82**	**42**	**28**	**11**	**1**	**233**	**201**	**96**
**4**	**Detroit Red Wings**	**CEN**	**82**	**48**	**22**	**10**	**2**	**278**	**210**	**108**
**5**	**Los Angeles Kings**	**PAC**	**82**	**39**	**27**	**12**	**4**	**245**	**228**	**94**
**6**	**Phoenix Coyotes**	**PAC**	**82**	**39**	**31**	**8**	**4**	**232**	**228**	**90**
**7**	**Edmonton Oilers**	**NW**	**82**	**32**	**26**	**16**	**8**	**226**	**212**	**88**
**8**	**San Jose Sharks**	**PAC**	**82**	**35**	**30**	**10**	**7**	**225**	**214**	**87**
8.5
9	Mighty Ducks of Anaheim	PAC	82	34	33	12	3	217	227	83
10	Vancouver Canucks	NW	82	30	29	15	8	227	237	83
11	Chicago Blackhawks	CEN	82	33	37	10	2	242	245	78
12	Calgary Flames	NW	82	31	36	10	5	211	256	77
13	Nashville Predators	CEN	82	28	40	7	7	199	240	70

Divisions: CEN – Central, PAC – Pacific, NW – Northwest

bold – Qualified for playoffs; p – Won Presidents' Trophy; y – Won division

== Schedule and results ==
1999–2000 regular season
October: 4–6–1–0 (home: 2–3–0–0; road: 2–3–1–0)

Game	Date	Score	Opponent	Record	Recap
1	October 2, 1999	0–2	Los Angeles Kings (1999–2000)	0–1–0–0	L
2	October 5, 1999	2–3	Colorado Avalanche (1999–2000)	0–2–0–0	L
3	October 10, 1999	3–3 OT	@ Chicago Blackhawks (1999–2000)	0–2–1–0	T
4	October 11, 1999	4–2	@ Toronto Maple Leafs (1999–2000)	1–2–1–0	W
5	October 14, 1999	1–5	San Jose Sharks (1999–2000)	1–3–1–0	L
6	October 16, 1999	3–2	Dallas Stars (1999–2000)	2–3–1–0	W
7	October 20, 1999	4–3	@ Buffalo Sabres (1999–2000)	3–3–1–0	W
8	October 23, 1999	4–3	Edmonton Oilers (1999–2000)	4–3–1–0	W
9	October 28, 1999	2–3	@ San Jose Sharks (1999–2000)	4–4–1–0	L
10	October 30, 1999	1–4	@ Vancouver Canucks (1999–2000)	4–5–1–0	L
11	October 31, 1999	2–4	@ Edmonton Oilers (1999–2000)	4–6–1–0	L

November: 3–7–0–2 (home: 1–5–0–0; road: 2–2–0–2)

Game	Date	Score	Opponent	Record	Recap
12	November 3, 1999	4–5 OT	@ Calgary Flames (1999–2000)	4–6–1–1	OTL
13	November 5, 1999	1–3	Chicago Blackhawks (1999–2000)	4–7–1–1	L
14	November 10, 1999	4–2	@ Chicago Blackhawks (1999–2000)	5–7–1–1	W
15	November 11, 1999	2–1	@ Ottawa Senators (1999–2000)	6–7–1–1	W
16	November 13, 1999	2–6	@ Pittsburgh Penguins (1999–2000)	6–8–1–1	L
17	November 18, 1999	6–1	Montreal Canadiens (1999–2000)	7–8–1–1	W
18	November 20, 1999	1–3	Vancouver Canucks (1999–2000)	7–9–1–1	L
19	November 22, 1999	2–3 OT	@ St. Louis Blues (1999–2000)	7–9–1–2	OTL
20	November 24, 1999	2–5	Boston Bruins (1999–2000)	7–10–1–2	L
21	November 26, 1999	0–1	@ Washington Capitals (1999–2000)	7–11–1–2	L
22	November 27, 1999	3–4	Mighty Ducks of Anaheim (1999–2000)	7–12–1–2	L
23	November 30, 1999	3–6	Phoenix Coyotes (1999–2000)	7–13–1–2	L

December: 6–5–4–0 (home: 3–2–2–0; road: 3–3–2–0)

Game	Date	Score	Opponent	Record	Recap
24	December 2, 1999	1–3	@ St. Louis Blues (1999–2000)	7–14–1–2	L
25	December 4, 1999	4–1	Detroit Red Wings (1999–2000)	8–14–1–2	W
26	December 6, 1999	4–3 OT	@ Atlanta Thrashers (1999–2000)	9–14–1–2	W
27	December 8, 1999	3–6	@ Detroit Red Wings (1999–2000)	9–15–1–2	L
28	December 10, 1999	2–4	St. Louis Blues (1999–2000)	9–16–1–2	L
29	December 11, 1999	2–4	Florida Panthers (1999–2000)	9–17–1–2	L
30	December 14, 1999	4–4 OT	@ Tampa Bay Lightning (1999–2000)	9–17–2–2	T
31	December 15, 1999	2–3	@ Florida Panthers (1999–2000)	9–18–2–2	L
32	December 18, 1999	2–2 OT	Colorado Avalanche (1999–2000)	9–18–3–2	T
33	December 19, 1999	1–1 OT	@ Philadelphia Flyers (1999–2000)	9–18–4–2	T
34	December 21, 1999	3–1	@ Boston Bruins (1999–2000)	10–18–4–2	W
35	December 23, 1999	2–2 OT	St. Louis Blues (1999–2000)	10–18–5–2	T
36	December 26, 1999	3–2	@ St. Louis Blues (1999–2000)	11–18–5–2	W
37	December 28, 1999	3–2	Carolina Hurricanes (1999–2000)	12–18–5–2	W
38	December 30, 1999	6–0	Atlanta Thrashers (1999–2000)	13–18–5–2	W

January: 6–5–1–2 (home: 4–1–1–1; road: 2–4–0–1)

Game	Date	Score	Opponent	Record	Recap
39	January 1, 2000	3–2	San Jose Sharks (1999–2000)	14–18–5–2	W
40	January 5, 2000	1–3	@ Dallas Stars (1999–2000)	14–19–5–2	L
41	January 6, 2000	2–5	@ Detroit Red Wings (1999–2000)	14–20–5–2	L
42	January 8, 2000	6–3	Chicago Blackhawks (1999–2000)	15–20–5–2	W
43	January 11, 2000	2–4	@ Colorado Avalanche (1999–2000)	15–21–5–2	L
44	January 13, 2000	3–4 OT	Vancouver Canucks (1999–2000)	15–21–5–3	OTL
45	January 15, 2000	4–2	Pittsburgh Penguins (1999–2000)	16–21–5–3	W
46	January 18, 2000	4–4 OT	Phoenix Coyotes (1999–2000)	16–21–6–3	T
47	January 21, 2000	4–5 OT	@ Calgary Flames (1999–2000)	16–21–6–4	OTL
48	January 23, 2000	2–1	@ Vancouver Canucks (1999–2000)	17–21–6–4	W
49	January 24, 2000	3–2 OT	@ Edmonton Oilers (1999–2000)	18–21–6–4	W
50	January 27, 2000	2–6	Los Angeles Kings (1999–2000)	18–22–6–4	L
51	January 29, 2000	3–1	Calgary Flames (1999–2000)	19–22–6–4	W
52	January 31, 2000	1–5	@ New York Rangers (1999–2000)	19–23–6–4	L

February: 3–7–0–1 (home: 1–5–0–1; road: 2–2–0–0)

Game	Date	Score	Opponent	Record	Recap
53	February 2, 2000	6–4	@ New York Islanders (1999–2000)	20–23–6–4	W
54	February 3, 2000	1–4	@ New Jersey Devils (1999–2000)	20–24–6–4	L
55	February 10, 2000	1–2 OT	Buffalo Sabres (1999–2000)	20–24–6–5	OTL
56	February 12, 2000	2–4	Washington Capitals (1999–2000)	20–25–6–5	L
57	February 15, 2000	1–2	Edmonton Oilers (1999–2000)	20–26–6–5	L
58	February 16, 2000	0–3	@ Dallas Stars (1999–2000)	20–27–6–5	L
59	February 18, 2000	1–2	St. Louis Blues (1999–2000)	20–28–6–5	L
60	February 21, 2000	5–2	Dallas Stars (1999–2000)	21–28–6–5	W
61	February 23, 2000	4–2	@ Chicago Blackhawks (1999–2000)	22–28–6–5	W
62	February 26, 2000	2–3	Tampa Bay Lightning (1999–2000)	22–29–6–5	L
63	February 29, 2000	1–2	New Jersey Devils (1999–2000)	22–30–6–5	L

March: 6–7–1–2 (home: 4–4–0–0; road: 2–3–1–2)

Game	Date	Score	Opponent	Record	Recap
64	March 2, 2000	3–4	@ San Jose Sharks (1999–2000)	22–31–6–5	L
65	March 4, 2000	2–3 OT	@ Los Angeles Kings (1999–2000)	22–31–6–6	OTL
66	March 5, 2000	0–1	@ Mighty Ducks of Anaheim (1999–2000)	22–32–6–6	L
67	March 7, 2000	3–1	Chicago Blackhawks (1999–2000)	23–32–6–6	W
68	March 10, 2000	1–3	Detroit Red Wings (1999–2000)	23–33–6–6	L
69	March 12, 2000	4–3	Edmonton Oilers (1999–2000)	24–33–6–6	W
70	March 14, 2000	2–3 OT	@ Detroit Red Wings (1999–2000)	24–33–6–7	OTL
71	March 16, 2000	2–2 OT	@ Colorado Avalanche (1999–2000)	24–33–7–7	T
72	March 17, 2000	4–3 OT	@ Phoenix Coyotes (1999–2000)	25–33–7–7	W
73	March 19, 2000	2–1 OT	@ Los Angeles Kings (1999–2000)	26–33–7–7	W
74	March 21, 2000	0–2	Philadelphia Flyers (1999–2000)	26–34–7–7	L
75	March 23, 2000	3–6	Detroit Red Wings (1999–2000)	26–35–7–7	L
76	March 25, 2000	1–2	Calgary Flames (1999–2000)	26–36–7–7	L
77	March 28, 2000	3–2	New York Islanders (1999–2000)	27–36–7–7	W
78	March 29, 2000	1–3	@ Carolina Hurricanes (1999–2000)	27–37–7–7	L
79	March 31, 2000	2–1	Vancouver Canucks (1999–2000)	28–37–7–7	W

April: 0–3–0–0 (home: 0–1–0–0; road: 0–2–0–0)

Game	Date	Score	Opponent	Record	Recap
80	April 3, 2000	1–3	@ Mighty Ducks of Anaheim (1999–2000)	28–38–7–7	L
81	April 5, 2000	2–3	@ Phoenix Coyotes (1999–2000)	28–39–7–7	L
82	April 7, 2000	1–5	Mighty Ducks of Anaheim (1999–2000)	28–40–7–7	L

Legend: W Win (2 points) L Loss (0 points) T Tie (1 point) OTL Overtime loss (1 point)

== Player statistics ==
=== Scoring ===
- Position abbreviations: C = Center; D = Defense; G = Goaltender; LW = Left wing; RW = Right wing
- † = Joined team via a transaction (e.g., trade, waivers, signing) during the season. Stats reflect time with the Predators only.
- ‡ = Left team via a transaction (e.g., trade, waivers, release) during the season. Stats reflect time with the Predators only.

No.	Player	Pos	Regular season					
No.	Player	Pos	GP	G	A	Pts	+/-	PIM
7	Cliff Ronning	C	82	26	36	62	−13	34
10	Patric Kjellberg	RW	82	23	23	46	−11	14
22	Greg Johnson	C	82	11	33	44	−15	40
44	Kimmo Timonen	D	51	8	25	33	−5	26
43	Vitali Yachmenev	LW	68	16	16	32	5	12
15	Drake Berehowsky	D	79	12	20	32	−4	87
11	David Legwand	C	71	13	15	28	−6	30
24	Scott Walker	RW	69	7	21	28	−16	90
16	Ville Peltonen	LW	79	6	22	28	−1	22
25	Sergei Krivokrasov‡	RW	63	9	17	26	−7	40
12	Rob Valicevic	RW	80	14	11	25	−11	21
27	Randy Robitaille	C	69	11	14	25	−13	10
71	Sebastien Bordeleau	C	60	10	13	23	−12	30
21	Tom Fitzgerald	RW	82	13	9	22	−18	66
8	Craig Millar	D	57	3	11	14	−6	28
23 (Note: Houlder wore number 3 in his first game.)	Bill Houlder†	D	57	2	12	14	−6	24
3	Karlis Skrastins	D	59	5	6	11	−7	20
18	Mark Mowers	C	41	4	5	9	0	10
6	Bob Boughner‡	D	62	2	4	6	−13	97
41	Richard Lintner	D	33	1	5	6	−6	22
42	Joel Bouchard‡	D	52	1	4	5	−11	23
2	Dan Keczmer‡	D	24	0	5	5	−2	28
40	David Gosselin	RW	10	2	1	3	−4	6
36	Niklas Andersson†‡	LW	7	0	1	1	0	0
9	Darren Turcotte‡	C	9	0	1	1	0	4
29	Tomas Vokoun	G	33	0	1	1		8
26	Andrew Berenzweig	D	2	0	0	0	−1	0
38	Alexandre Boikov	D	2	0	0	0	0	2
39	Marian Cisar	RW	3	0	0	0	−2	4
17	Patrick Cote	LW	21	0	0	0	−7	70
26	Phil Crowe	LW	4	0	0	0	0	10
1	Mike Dunham	G	52	0	0	0		6
33	Marc Moro	D	8	0	0	0	−3	40
20	John Namestnikov†	D	2	0	0	0	0	2
5	Jan Vopat	D	6	0	0	0	1	6

=== Goaltending ===
No.	Player	Regular season									
No.	Player	GP	W	L	T	SA	GA	GAA	SV%	SO	TOI
1	Mike Dunham	52	19	27	6	1584	146	2.85	.908	0	3077
29	Tomas Vokoun	33	9	20	1	908	87	2.78	.904	1	1879

== Awards and records ==
=== Awards ===
Type	Award/honor	Recipient	Ref
League (in-season)	NHL Player of the Week	Tomas Vokoun (January 3)	

=== Milestones ===
Milestone	Player	Date	Ref
First game	Richard Lintner	October 2, 1999	
First game	David Gosselin	March 14, 2000	
First game	Marian Cisar	March 28, 2000	
First game	Alexandre Boikov	March 31, 2000	
First game	Andrew Berenzweig	April 5, 2000	

== Draft picks ==
Nashville's draft picks at the 1999 NHL entry draft held at the FleetCenter in Boston, Massachusetts.

Round	#	Player	Nationality	College/Junior/Club team (League)
1	6	Brian Finley	Canada	Barrie Colts (OHL)
2	33	Jonas Andersson	Sweden	AIK IF Jr. (Sweden)
2	52	Adam Hall	Canada	Oshawa Generals (OHL)
2	54	Andrew Hutchinson	United States	Michigan State University (NCAA)
2	61	Ed Hill	United States	Barrie Colts (OHL)
2	65	Jan Lasak	Slovakia	HKm Zvolen (Slovakia)
3	72	Brett Angel	Canada	North Bay Centennials (OHL)
4	121	Evgeny Pavlov	Russia	Lada Togliatti (Russia)
4	124	Alexander Krevsun	Kazakhstan	CSK VVS Samara (Russia)
5	131	Konstantin Panov	Russia	Kamloops Blazers (WHL)
6	162	Timo Helbling	Switzerland	HC Davos (Switzerland)
7	191	Martin Erat	Czech Republic	ZPS Zlin Jr. (Czech Republic)
7	205	Kyle Kettles	Canada	Neepawa Natives (MJHL)
8	220	Miroslav Durak	Slovakia	Slovan Bratislava Jr. (Slovakia)
9	248	Darren Haydar	Canada	University of New Hampshire (NCAA)

== See also ==
- 1999–2000 NHL season
