= 1999–2000 Buffalo Sabres season =

NHL hockey team season

1999–2000 Buffalo Sabres
- Division: 3rd Northeast
- Conference: 8th Eastern
- 1999–2000 record: 35–32–11–4
- Home record: 21–14–5–1
- Road record: 14–18–6–3
- Goals for: 213
- Goals against: 204

Team information
- General manager: Darcy Regier
- Coach: Lindy Ruff
- Captain: Michael Peca
- Alternate captains: Doug Gilmour; Rob Ray; Jason Woolley
- Arena: HSBC Arena
- Average attendance: 17,955
- Minor league affiliates: Rochester Americans; South Carolina Stingrays; B.C. Icemen

Team leaders
- Goals: Miroslav Satan (33)
- Assists: Miroslav Satan (34)
- Points: Miroslav Satan (67)
- Penalty minutes: Rob Ray (158)
- Plus/minus: Curtis Brown (+19)
- Wins: Martin Biron (19)
- Goals against average: Dominik Hasek (2.21)

The 1999–2000 Buffalo Sabres season was the 30th for the National Hockey League (NHL) franchise that was established on May 22, 1970. The season saw the Sabres qualify for the 2000 Stanley Cup playoffs, but lose in the first round to the Philadelphia Flyers.

== Regular season ==
The Sabres struggled on the power-play, scoring only 37 power-play goals (tied for 28th with Phoenix Coyotes) and finishing 28th in power-play percentage (10.54%).

=== Final standings ===
Northeast Division
No.	CR		GP	W	L	T	OTL	GF	GA	Pts
1	3	**Toronto Maple Leafs**	82	45	27	7	3	246	222	100
2	6	**Ottawa Senators**	82	41	28	11	2	244	210	95
3	8	**Buffalo Sabres**	82	35	32	11	4	213	204	85
4	10	Montreal Canadiens	82	35	34	9	4	196	194	83
5	11	Boston Bruins	82	24	33	19	6	210	248	73

Note: CR = Conference rank; GP = Games played; W = Wins; L = Losses; T = Ties; GF = Goals for; GA = Goals against; Pts = Points
Bolded teams qualified for the playoffs.

Eastern Conference
R		Div	GP	W	L	T	OTL	GF	GA	Pts
**1**	**z – Philadelphia Flyers**	**AT**	**82**	**45**	**22**	**12**	**3**	**237**	**179**	105
**2**	**y – Washington Capitals**	**SE**	**82**	**44**	**24**	**12**	**2**	**227**	**194**	102
**3**	**y – Toronto Maple Leafs**	**NE**	**82**	**45**	**27**	**7**	**3**	**246**	**222**	100
**4**	**New Jersey Devils**	**AT**	**82**	**45**	**24**	**8**	**5**	**251**	**203**	103
**5**	**Florida Panthers**	**SE**	**82**	**43**	**27**	**6**	**6**	**244**	**209**	98
**6**	**Ottawa Senators**	**NE**	**82**	**41**	**28**	**11**	**2**	**244**	**210**	95
**7**	**Pittsburgh Penguins**	**AT**	**82**	**37**	**31**	**8**	**6**	**241**	**236**	88
**8**	**Buffalo Sabres**	**NE**	**82**	**35**	**32**	**11**	**4**	**213**	**204**	85
8.5
9	Carolina Hurricanes	SE	82	37	35	10	0	217	216	84
10	Montreal Canadiens	NE	82	35	34	9	4	196	194	83
11	New York Rangers	AT	82	29	38	12	3	218	246	73
12	Boston Bruins	NE	82	24	33	19	6	210	248	73
13	New York Islanders	AT	82	24	48	9	1	194	275	58
14	Tampa Bay Lightning	SE	82	19	47	9	7	204	310	54
15	Atlanta Thrashers	SE	82	14	57	7	4	170	313	39

Divisions: AT – Atlantic, NE – Northeast, SE – Southeast

bold – Qualified for playoffs; z – Won conference; y – Won division

== Playoffs ==
The Sabres lost the Conference Quarterfinals (4–1) versus the Philadelphia Flyers.

== Schedule and results ==
=== Regular season ===
1999–2000 regular season
October: 3–7–2–0 (home: 3–2–1–0; road: 0–5–1–0)

Game	Date	Score	Opponent	Record	Recap
1	October 2, 1999	0–2	@ Detroit Red Wings (1999–2000)	0–1–0–0	L
2	October 8, 1999	2–3	Washington Capitals (1999–2000)	0–2–0–0	L
3	October 9, 1999	5–5 OT	@ Atlanta Thrashers (1999–2000)	0–2–1–0	T
4	October 11, 1999	2–2 OT	Phoenix Coyotes (1999–2000)	0–2–2–0	T
5	October 16, 1999	1–2	@ Montreal Canadiens (1999–2000)	0–3–2–0	L
6	October 17, 1999	2–5	@ Philadelphia Flyers (1999–2000)	0–4–2–0	L
7	October 20, 1999	3–4	Nashville Predators (1999–2000)	0–5–2–0	L
8	October 22, 1999	7–3	Carolina Hurricanes (1999–2000)	1–5–2–0	W
9	October 23, 1999	0–4	@ Ottawa Senators (1999–2000)	1–6–2–0	L
10	October 27, 1999	4–3	Tampa Bay Lightning (1999–2000)	2–6–2–0	W
11	October 29, 1999	3–2 OT	Florida Panthers (1999–2000)	3–6–2–0	W
12	October 30, 1999	0–3	@ Boston Bruins (1999–2000)	3–7–2–0	L

November: 8–5–0–0 (home: 4–2–0–0; road: 4–3–0–0)

Game	Date	Score	Opponent	Record	Recap
13	November 3, 1999	3–1	@ Dallas Stars (1999–2000)	4–7–2–0	W
14	November 4, 1999	5–4 OT	@ Chicago Blackhawks (1999–2000)	5–7–2–0	W
15	November 6, 1999	2–1	New York Islanders (1999–2000)	6–7–2–0	W
16	November 10, 1999	6–2	Boston Bruins (1999–2000)	7–7–2–0	W
17	November 12, 1999	2–4	@ Tampa Bay Lightning (1999–2000)	7–8–2–0	L
18	November 13, 1999	1–3	@ Florida Panthers (1999–2000)	7–9–2–0	L
19	November 16, 1999	2–3	@ Pittsburgh Penguins (1999–2000)	7–10–2–0	L
20	November 19, 1999	4–0	@ Atlanta Thrashers (1999–2000)	8–10–2–0	W
21	November 20, 1999	4–3	Atlanta Thrashers (1999–2000)	9–10–2–0	W
22	November 24, 1999	5–2	Washington Capitals (1999–2000)	10–10–2–0	W
23	November 26, 1999	0–2	St. Louis Blues (1999–2000)	10–11–2–0	L
24	November 28, 1999	3–2 OT	@ Tampa Bay Lightning (1999–2000)	11–11–2–0	W
25	November 30, 1999	1–4	Pittsburgh Penguins (1999–2000)	11–12–2–0	L

December: 4–4–3–1 (home: 3–3–2–0; road: 1–1–1–1)

Game	Date	Score	Opponent	Record	Recap
26	December 2, 1999	2–4	Philadelphia Flyers (1999–2000)	11–13–2–0	L
27	December 4, 1999	1–1 OT	New York Rangers (1999–2000)	11–13–3–0	T
28	December 6, 1999	2–3 OT	@ Toronto Maple Leafs (1999–2000)	11–13–3–1	OTL
29	December 8, 1999	0–0 OT	Ottawa Senators (1999–2000)	11–13–4–1	T
30	December 10, 1999	2–1	Chicago Blackhawks (1999–2000)	12–13–4–1	W
31	December 14, 1999	3–1	Philadelphia Flyers (1999–2000)	13–13–4–1	W
32	December 17, 1999	2–4	Florida Panthers (1999–2000)	13–14–4–1	L
33	December 18, 1999	2–2 OT	@ New York Islanders (1999–2000)	13–14–5–1	T
34	December 21, 1999	3–1	@ New York Rangers (1999–2000)	14–14–5–1	W
35	December 23, 1999	2–1	Colorado Avalanche (1999–2000)	15–14–5–1	W
36	December 27, 1999	1–4	@ New Jersey Devils (1999–2000)	15–15–5–1	L
37	December 28, 1999	2–7	Detroit Red Wings (1999–2000)	15–16–5–1	L

January: 5–8–1–0 (home: 3–3–0–0; road: 2–5–1–0)

Game	Date	Score	Opponent	Record	Recap
38	January 1, 2000	8–1	Toronto Maple Leafs (1999–2000)	16–16–5–1	W
39	January 3, 2000	2–6	@ Toronto Maple Leafs (1999–2000)	16–17–5–1	L
40	January 4, 2000	4–5	Atlanta Thrashers (1999–2000)	16–18–5–1	L
41	January 6, 2000	3–6	New Jersey Devils (1999–2000)	16–19–5–1	L
42	January 8, 2000	7–4	@ Ottawa Senators (1999–2000)	17–19–5–1	W
43	January 13, 2000	0–0 OT	@ Boston Bruins (1999–2000)	17–19–6–1	T
44	January 14, 2000	1–2	Montreal Canadiens (1999–2000)	17–20–6–1	L
45	January 17, 2000	5–0	@ Mighty Ducks of Anaheim (1999–2000)	18–20–6–1	W
46	January 18, 2000	3–5	@ Los Angeles Kings (1999–2000)	18–21–6–1	L
47	January 20, 2000	1–2	@ Phoenix Coyotes (1999–2000)	18–22–6–1	L
48	January 22, 2000	1–4	@ Carolina Hurricanes (1999–2000)	18–23–6–1	L
49	January 25, 2000	2–1	Tampa Bay Lightning (1999–2000)	19–23–6–1	W
50	January 28, 2000	1–0	Ottawa Senators (1999–2000)	20–23–6–1	W
51	January 29, 2000	0–1	@ Boston Bruins (1999–2000)	20–24–6–1	L

February: 6–3–3–1 (home: 3–2–2–0; road: 3–1–1–1)

Game	Date	Score	Opponent	Record	Recap
52	February 1, 2000	2–2 OT	Mighty Ducks of Anaheim (1999–2000)	20–24–7–1	T
53	February 3, 2000	4–2	Ottawa Senators (1999–2000)	21–24–7–1	W
54	February 8, 2000	2–0	@ Colorado Avalanche (1999–2000)	22–24–7–1	W
55	February 10, 2000	2–1 OT	@ Nashville Predators (1999–2000)	23–24–7–1	W
56	February 12, 2000	2–3 OT	@ Philadelphia Flyers (1999–2000)	23–24–7–2	OTL
57	February 13, 2000	2–2 OT	Edmonton Oilers (1999–2000)	23–24–8–2	T
58	February 16, 2000	1–1 OT	@ Pittsburgh Penguins (1999–2000)	23–24–9–2	T
59	February 17, 2000	1–2	Vancouver Canucks (1999–2000)	23–25–9–2	L
60	February 19, 2000	4–1	Los Angeles Kings (1999–2000)	24–25–9–2	W
61	February 21, 2000	3–2	New Jersey Devils (1999–2000)	25–25–9–2	W
62	February 25, 2000	3–6	New York Rangers (1999–2000)	25–26–9–2	L
63	February 26, 2000	2–5	@ Toronto Maple Leafs (1999–2000)	25–27–9–2	L
64	February 28, 2000	5–2	@ Florida Panthers (1999–2000)	26–27–9–2	W

March: 6–5–1–1 (home: 4–2–0–0; road: 2–3–1–1)

Game	Date	Score	Opponent	Record	Recap
65	March 1, 2000	3–3 OT	@ New York Rangers (1999–2000)	26–27–10–2	T
66	March 4, 2000	2–4	@ New York Islanders (1999–2000)	26–28–10–2	L
67	March 5, 2000	1–2	@ Washington Capitals (1999–2000)	26–29–10–2	L
68	March 8, 2000	2–1 OT	Boston Bruins (1999–2000)	27–29–10–2	W
69	March 10, 2000	2–3	Montreal Canadiens (1999–2000)	27–30–10–2	L
70	March 12, 2000	4–2	New York Islanders (1999–2000)	28–30–10–2	W
71	March 15, 2000	5–6 OT	@ San Jose Sharks (1999–2000)	28–30–10–3	OTL
72	March 16, 2000	3–6	@ Vancouver Canucks (1999–2000)	28–31–10–3	L
73	March 18, 2000	5–1	@ Calgary Flames (1999–2000)	29–31–10–3	W
74	March 20, 2000	4–1	Montreal Canadiens (1999–2000)	30–31–10–3	W
75	March 23, 2000	4–2	Calgary Flames (1999–2000)	31–31–10–3	W
76	March 27, 2000	5–1	@ Carolina Hurricanes (1999–2000)	32–31–10–3	W
77	March 31, 2000	1–3	Carolina Hurricanes (1999–2000)	32–32–10–3	L

April: 3–0–1–1 (home: 1–0–0–1; road: 2–0–1–0)

Game	Date	Score	Opponent	Record	Recap
78	April 1, 2000	2–0	@ Montreal Canadiens (1999–2000)	33–32–10–3	W
79	April 3, 2000	3–2	Toronto Maple Leafs (1999–2000)	34–32–10–3	W
80	April 6, 2000	5–0	@ New Jersey Devils (1999–2000)	35–32–10–3	W
81	April 7, 2000	1–2 OT	Pittsburgh Penguins (1999–2000)	35–32–10–4	OTL
82	April 9, 2000	1–1 OT	@ Washington Capitals (1999–2000)	35–32–11–4	T

Legend: W Win (2 points) L Loss (0 points) T Tie (1 point) OTL Overtime loss (1 point)

=== Playoffs ===
2000 Stanley Cup playoffs
Eastern Conference Quarterfinals vs. (1) Philadelphia Flyers – Flyers win 4–1

Game	Date	Score	Opponent	Series	Recap
1	April 13, 2000	2–3	@ Philadelphia Flyers	Flyers lead 1–0	L
2	April 14, 2000	1–2	@ Philadelphia Flyers	Flyers lead 2–0	L
3	April 16, 2000	0–2	Philadelphia Flyers	Flyers lead 3–0	L
4	April 18, 2000	3–2 OT	Philadelphia Flyers	Flyers lead 3–1	W
5	April 20, 2000	2–5	@ Philadelphia Flyers	Flyers win 4–1	L

Legend: W Win L Loss

== Player statistics ==
=== Scoring ===
- Position abbreviations: C = Center; D = Defense; G = Goaltender; LW = Left wing; RW = Right wing
- † = Joined team via a transaction (e.g., trade, waivers, signing) during the season. Stats reflect time with the Sabres only.
- ‡ = Left team via a transaction (e.g., trade, waivers, release) during the season. Stats reflect time with the Sabres only.

No.	Player	Pos	Regular season						Playoffs					
No.	Player	Pos	GP	G	A	Pts	+/-	PIM	GP	G	A	Pts	+/-	PIM
81	Miroslav Satan	LW	81	33	34	67	16	32	5	3	2	5	2	0
37	Curtis Brown	C	74	22	29	51	19	42	5	1	3	4	1	6
41	Stu Barnes	C	82	20	25	45	−3	16	5	3	0	3	−1	2
27	Michael Peca	C	73	20	21	41	6	67	5	0	1	1	−1	4
25	Vaclav Varada	RW	76	10	27	37	12	62	5	0	0	0	1	8
61	Maxim Afinogenov	RW	65	16	18	34	−4	41	5	0	1	1	−2	2
18	Michal Grosek‡	LW	61	11	23	34	12	35	—	—	—	—	—	—
5	Jason Woolley	D	74	8	25	33	14	52	5	0	2	2	1	2
8	Geoff Sanderson	LW	67	13	13	26	4	22	5	0	2	2	0	8
19	Brian Holzinger‡	C	59	7	17	24	4	30	—	—	—	—	—	—
15	Dixon Ward	RW	71	11	9	20	1	41	5	0	1	1	1	2
29	Vladimir Tsyplakov†	LW	34	6	13	19	17	10	5	0	1	1	1	4
74	Jay McKee	D	78	5	12	17	5	50	1	0	0	0	0	0
93	Doug Gilmour†	C	11	3	14	17	3	12	5	0	1	1	−1	0
9	Erik Rasmussen	C	67	8	6	14	1	43	3	0	0	0	0	4
3	James Patrick	D	66	5	8	13	8	22	5	0	1	1	1	2
44	Alexei Zhitnik	D	74	2	11	13	−6	95	4	0	0	0	−1	8
22	Wayne Primeau‡	C	41	5	7	12	−8	38	—	—	—	—	—	—
42	Richard Smehlik	D	64	2	9	11	13	50	5	1	0	1	0	0
77	Chris Gratton†	C	14	1	7	8	1	15	5	0	1	1	−1	4
51	Brian Campbell	D	12	1	4	5	−2	4	—	—	—	—	—	—
32	Rob Ray	RW	69	1	3	4	0	158	—	—	—	—	—	—
6	Cory Sarich‡	D	42	0	4	4	2	35	—	—	—	—	—	—
4	Rhett Warrener	D	61	0	3	3	18	89	5	0	0	0	−1	2
16	Chris Taylor	C	11	1	1	2	−2	2	2	0	0	0	−1	2
55	Denis Hamel	LW	3	1	0	1	−1	0	—	—	—	—	—	—
12 (Note: Pittis wore number 28 in his first four games.)	Domenic Pittis	C	7	1	0	1	1	6	—	—	—	—	—	—
39	Dominik Hasek	G	35	0	1	1		12	5	0	0	0		2
20 (Note: Holland wore number 29 in his first game.)	Jason Holland	D	9	0	1	1	0	0	1	0	0	0	0	0
43	Martin Biron	G	41	0	0	0		6	—	—	—	—	—	—
34	Jean-Luc Grand-Pierre	D	11	0	0	0	−1	15	4	0	0	0	0	4
20	Doug Houda	D	1	0	0	0	0	12	—	—	—	—	—	—
21	Mike Hurlbut	D	1	0	0	0	1	2	—	—	—	—	—	—
45	Dmitri Kalinin	D	4	0	0	0	0	4	—	—	—	—	—	—
24	Paul Kruse	LW	11	0	0	0	−2	43	—	—	—	—	—	—
64	David Moravec	RW	1	0	0	0	−1	0	—	—	—	—	—	—
30	Dwayne Roloson	G	14	0	0	0		0	—	—	—	—	—	—

=== Goaltending ===
No.	Player	Regular season										Playoffs								
No.	Player	GP	W	L	T	SA	GA	GAA	SV%	SO	TOI	GP	W	L	SA	GA	GAA	SV%	SO	TOI
43	Martin Biron	41	19	18	2	988	90	2.42	.909	5	2228:57	—	—	—	—	—	—	—	—	—
39	Dominik Hasek	35	15	11	6	937	76	2.21	.919	3	2066:26	5	1	4	147	12	2.39	.918	0	301
30	Dwayne Roloson	14	1	7	3	277	32	2.84	.884	0	677:10	—	—	—	—	—	—	—	—	—

== Awards and records ==
=== Awards ===
Type	Award/honor	Recipient	Ref
League (in-season)	NHL All-Star Game selection	Dominik Hasek (Note: Hasek was voted to the starting lineup but did not play. He was replaced by Roman Turek of the St. Louis Blues.)	
League (in-season)	NHL All-Star Game selection	Miroslav Satan	
League (in-season)	NHL Player of the Week	Martin Biron (November 8)	
League (in-season)	NHL Player of the Week	Dominik Hasek (April 10)	

=== Milestones ===
Milestone	Player	Date	Ref
First game	Brian Campbell	October 2, 1999	
First game	David Moravec	October 2, 1999	
First game	Maxim Afinogenov	November 10, 1999	
First game	Dmitri Kalinin	January 4, 2000	
First game	Denis Hamel	January 6, 2000	
1,000th game played	James Patrick	December 4, 1999	

== Draft picks ==
Buffalo's draft picks at the 1999 NHL entry draft held at the FleetCenter in Boston, Massachusetts.

Round	#	Player	Nationality	College/Junior/Club team (League)
1	20	Barrett Heisten	United States	University of Maine (Hockey East)
2	35	Milan Bartovic	Czech Republic	Dukla Trenčín Jr. (Slovakia)
2	55	Doug Janik	United States	University of Maine (Hockey East)
2	64	Mike Zigomanis	Canada	Kingston Frontenacs (OHL)
3	73	Tim Preston	Canada	Seattle Thunderbirds (WHL)
4	117	Karel Mosovsky	Czech Republic	Regina Pats (WHL)
5	138	Ryan Miller	United States	Michigan State University (CCHA)
5	146	Matt Kinch	Canada	Calgary Hitmen (WHL)
6	178	Seneque Hyacinthe	Canada	Val-d'Or Foreurs (QMJHL)
7	206	Bret DeCecco	Canada	Seattle Thunderbirds (WHL)
8	235	Brad Self	Canada	Peterborough Petes (OHL)
9	263	Craig Brunel	Canada	Prince Albert Raiders (WHL)

== See also ==
- 1999–2000 NHL season
