= 1999–2000 Carolina Hurricanes season =

National Hockey League team season

1999–2000 Carolina Hurricanes
- Division: 3rd Southeast
- Conference: 9th Eastern
- 1999–2000 record: 37–35–10–0
- Home record: 20–16–5–0
- Road record: 17–19–5–0
- Goals for: 217
- Goals against: 216

Team information
- General manager: Jim Rutherford
- Coach: Paul Maurice
- Captain: Ron Francis
- Arena: Raleigh Sports and Entertainment Arena
- Average attendance: 12,400
- Minor league affiliates: Cincinnati Cyclones; Florida Everblades

Team leaders
- Goals: Jeff O'Neill (25)
- Assists: Ron Francis (50)
- Points: Ron Francis (73)
- Penalty minutes: Nolan Pratt (90)
- Plus/minus: Bates Battaglia (+20)
- Wins: Arturs Irbe (34)
- Goals against average: Arturs Irbe (2.42)

The 1999–2000 Carolina Hurricanes season was the franchise's 21st season in the National Hockey League and third as the Hurricanes. The Hurricanes failed to qualify for the playoffs, despite qualifying the previous year.

== Regular season ==
The Hurricanes were the least penalized team during the regular season, with only 253 power-play opportunities against them.

Along with the NHL 2000 patch worn league-wide, Carolina wore Two other patches, one that celebrated their first season at the New Raleigh Entertainment and Sports Arena, and the other in memory of Steve Chiasson, who died in a drunk driving crash after the Hurricanes were eliminated in the quarterfinals of the 1999 Stanley Cup Playoffs.

=== Final standings ===
Southeast Division
No.	CR		GP	W	L	T	OTL	GF	GA	Pts
1	2	**Washington Capitals**	82	44	24	12	2	227	194	102
2	5	**Florida Panthers**	82	43	27	6	6	244	209	98
3	9	Carolina Hurricanes	82	37	35	10	0	217	216	84
4	14	Tampa Bay Lightning	82	19	47	9	7	204	310	54
5	15	Atlanta Thrashers	82	14	57	7	4	170	313	39

Note: CR = Conference rank; GP = Games played; W = Wins; L = Losses; T = Ties; OTL=Overtime loss; GF = Goals for; GA = Goals against; PIM=Penalties in Minutes; Pts = Points
Bolded teams qualified for the playoffs.

Eastern Conference
R		Div	GP	W	L	T	OTL	GF	GA	Pts
**1**	**z – Philadelphia Flyers**	**AT**	**82**	**45**	**22**	**12**	**3**	**237**	**179**	105
**2**	**y – Washington Capitals**	**SE**	**82**	**44**	**24**	**12**	**2**	**227**	**194**	102
**3**	**y – Toronto Maple Leafs**	**NE**	**82**	**45**	**27**	**7**	**3**	**246**	**222**	100
**4**	**New Jersey Devils**	**AT**	**82**	**45**	**24**	**8**	**5**	**251**	**203**	103
**5**	**Florida Panthers**	**SE**	**82**	**43**	**27**	**6**	**6**	**244**	**209**	98
**6**	**Ottawa Senators**	**NE**	**82**	**41**	**28**	**11**	**2**	**244**	**210**	95
**7**	**Pittsburgh Penguins**	**AT**	**82**	**37**	**31**	**8**	**6**	**241**	**236**	88
**8**	**Buffalo Sabres**	**NE**	**82**	**35**	**32**	**11**	**4**	**213**	**204**	85
8.5
9	Carolina Hurricanes	SE	82	37	35	10	0	217	216	84
10	Montreal Canadiens	NE	82	35	34	9	4	196	194	83
11	New York Rangers	AT	82	29	38	12	3	218	246	73
12	Boston Bruins	NE	82	24	33	19	6	210	248	73
13	New York Islanders	AT	82	24	48	9	1	194	275	58
14	Tampa Bay Lightning	SE	82	19	47	9	7	204	310	54
15	Atlanta Thrashers	SE	82	14	57	7	4	170	313	39

Divisions: AT – Atlantic, NE – Northeast, SE – Southeast

bold – Qualified for playoffs; z – Won conference; y – Won division

== Schedule and results ==
1999–2000 regular season
October: 5–3–3–0 (home: 0–1–0–0; road: 5–2–3–0)

Game	Date	Score	Opponent	Record	Attendance	Recap
1	October 2, 1999	3–1	@ Boston Bruins (1999–2000)	1–0–0–0	16,189	W
2	October 7, 1999	2–0	@ Philadelphia Flyers (1999–2000)	2–0–0–0	19,273	W
3	October 8, 1999	1–3	@ New York Rangers (1999–2000)	2–1–0–0	18,200	L
4	October 11, 1999	3–3 OT	@ Calgary Flames (1999–2000)	2–1–1–0	12,328	T
5	October 13, 1999	3–3 OT	@ Edmonton Oilers (1999–2000)	2–1–2–0	13,372	T
6	October 15, 1999	4–1	@ Vancouver Canucks (1999–2000)	3–1–2–0	13,701	W
7	October 20, 1999	3–3 OT	@ Toronto Maple Leafs (1999–2000)	3–1–3–0	18,872	T
8	October 22, 1999	3–7	@ Buffalo Sabres (1999–2000)	3–2–3–0	15,434	L
9	October 23, 1999	3–2	@ Pittsburgh Penguins (1999–2000)	4–2–3–0	15,711	W
10	October 29, 1999	2–4	New Jersey Devils (1999–2000)	4–3–3–0	18,730	L
11	October 30, 1999	4–0	@ New York Islanders (1999–2000)	5–3–3–0	8,944	W

November: 6–5–3–0 (home: 6–3–1–0; road: 0–2–2–0)

Game	Date	Score	Opponent	Record	Attendance	Recap
12	November 3, 1999	0–6	Toronto Maple Leafs (1999–2000)	5–4–3–0	15,961	L
13	November 5, 1999	2–3	@ Detroit Red Wings (1999–2000)	5–5–3–0	19,983	L
14	November 7, 1999	3–2	Washington Capitals (1999–2000)	6–5–3–0	12,624	W
15	November 10, 1999	0–2	New York Islanders (1999–2000)	6–6–3–0	11,413	L
16	November 11, 1999	1–4	@ Philadelphia Flyers (1999–2000)	6–7–3–0	19,499	L
17	November 13, 1999	4–2	Tampa Bay Lightning (1999–2000)	7–7–3–0	10,288	W
18	November 17, 1999	2–1	Ottawa Senators (1999–2000)	8–7–3–0	11,237	W
19	November 19, 1999	3–3 OT	@ Washington Capitals (1999–2000)	8–7–4–0	11,943	T
20	November 20, 1999	1–0	Dallas Stars (1999–2000)	9–7–4–0	13,442	W
21	November 22, 1999	1–2	Boston Bruins (1999–2000)	9–8–4–0	14,709	L
22	November 24, 1999	1–1 OT	Vancouver Canucks (1999–2000)	9–8–5–0	12,932	T
23	November 26, 1999	3–3 OT	@ Tampa Bay Lightning (1999–2000)	9–8–6–0	14,344	T
24	November 27, 1999	5–3	Pittsburgh Penguins (1999–2000)	10–8–6–0	14,268	W
25	November 30, 1999	4–3	Calgary Flames (1999–2000)	11–8–6–0	7,903	W

December: 3–8–1–0 (home: 2–3–1–0; road: 1–5–0–0)

Game	Date	Score	Opponent	Record	Attendance	Recap
26	December 2, 1999	2–2 OT	Toronto Maple Leafs (1999–2000)	11–8–7–0	9,367	T
27	December 4, 1999	1–3	@ Colorado Avalanche (1999–2000)	11–9–7–0	18,007	L
28	December 7, 1999	4–2	@ St. Louis Blues (1999–2000)	12–9–7–0	16,356	W
29	December 8, 1999	1–2	@ Dallas Stars (1999–2000)	12–10–7–0	17,001	L
30	December 10, 1999	2–3	@ Tampa Bay Lightning (1999–2000)	12–11–7–0	12,974	L
31	December 15, 1999	3–6	Pittsburgh Penguins (1999–2000)	12–12–7–0	11,387	L
32	December 18, 1999	4–2	Atlanta Thrashers (1999–2000)	13–12–7–0	10,187	W
33	December 20, 1999	2–4	Colorado Avalanche (1999–2000)	13–13–7–0	12,236	L
34	December 22, 1999	1–4	Detroit Red Wings (1999–2000)	13–14–7–0	15,375	L
35	December 23, 1999	3–4	@ Ottawa Senators (1999–2000)	13–15–7–0	18,500	L
36	December 26, 1999	4–3 OT	Florida Panthers (1999–2000)	14–15–7–0	13,940	W
37	December 28, 1999	2–3	@ Nashville Predators (1999–2000)	14–16–7–0	17,113	L

January: 6–8–1–0 (home: 4–4–1–0; road: 2–4–0–0)

Game	Date	Score	Opponent	Record	Attendance	Recap
38	January 1, 2000	4–2	@ Atlanta Thrashers (1999–2000)	15–16–7–0	17,642	W
39	January 4, 2000	1–2	Ottawa Senators (1999–2000)	15–17–7–0	7,848	L
40	January 6, 2000	7–3	@ Boston Bruins (1999–2000)	16–17–7–0	15,582	W
41	January 7, 2000	4–4 OT	Mighty Ducks of Anaheim (1999–2000)	16–17–8–0	12,002	T
42	January 9, 2000	1–0	New York Rangers (1999–2000)	17–17–8–0	12,174	W
43	January 11, 2000	3–4	Philadelphia Flyers (1999–2000)	17–18–8–0	11,609	L
44	January 14, 2000	1–5	@ Florida Panthers (1999–2000)	17–19–8–0	15,073	L
45	January 17, 2000	2–5	@ New Jersey Devils (1999–2000)	17–20–8–0	11,042	L
46	January 18, 2000	2–3	@ New York Rangers (1999–2000)	17–21–8–0	18,200	L
47	January 20, 2000	1–4	New York Rangers (1999–2000)	17–22–8–0	11,073	L
48	January 22, 2000	4–1	Buffalo Sabres (1999–2000)	18–22–8–0	16,345	W
49	January 24, 2000	3–2 OT	Montreal Canadiens (1999–2000)	19–22–8–0	8,552	W
50	January 27, 2000	2–4	Phoenix Coyotes (1999–2000)	19–23–8–0	9,675	L
51	January 28, 2000	4–3 OT	New Jersey Devils (1999–2000)	20–23–8–0	12,136	W
52	January 30, 2000	0–3	@ Montreal Canadiens (1999–2000)	20–24–8–0	19,380	L

February: 6–4–1–0 (home: 2–2–1–0; road: 4–2–0–0)

Game	Date	Score	Opponent	Record	Attendance	Recap
53	February 1, 2000	4–2	Florida Panthers (1999–2000)	21–24–8–0	8,482	W
54	February 3, 2000	1–2	@ Washington Capitals (1999–2000)	21–25–8–0	12,439	L
55	February 8, 2000	4–3	@ New York Islanders (1999–2000)	22–25–8–0	6,891	W
56	February 12, 2000	5–2	@ Tampa Bay Lightning (1999–2000)	23–25–8–0	13,097	W
57	February 14, 2000	5–2	@ Toronto Maple Leafs (1999–2000)	24–25–8–0	19,136	W
58	February 15, 2000	1–5	@ Ottawa Senators (1999–2000)	24–26–8–0	16,610	L
59	February 17, 2000	0–3	Montreal Canadiens (1999–2000)	24–27–8–0	16,416	L
60	February 19, 2000	4–2	Tampa Bay Lightning (1999–2000)	25–27–8–0	14,896	W
61	February 21, 2000	1–1 OT	Washington Capitals (1999–2000)	25–27–9–0	10,144	T
62	February 24, 2000	2–4	Florida Panthers (1999–2000)	25–28–9–0	10,494	L
63	February 26, 2000	2–1 OT	@ Florida Panthers (1999–2000)	26–28–9–0	16,801	W

March: 8–6–1–0 (home: 4–3–1–0; road: 4–3–0–0)

Game	Date	Score	Opponent	Record	Attendance	Recap
64	March 1, 2000	5–7	@ Phoenix Coyotes (1999–2000)	26–29–9–0	14,666	L
65	March 2, 2000	5–2	@ Los Angeles Kings (1999–2000)	27–29–9–0	15,424	W
66	March 4, 2000	5–2	@ San Jose Sharks (1999–2000)	28–29–9–0	17,483	W
67	March 8, 2000	4–1	Chicago Blackhawks (1999–2000)	29–29–9–0	10,332	W
68	March 10, 2000	3–5	Boston Bruins (1999–2000)	29–30–9–0	13,716	L
69	March 12, 2000	5–1	Atlanta Thrashers (1999–2000)	30–30–9–0	11,513	W
70	March 15, 2000	2–2 OT	Edmonton Oilers (1999–2000)	30–30–10–0	9,789	T
71	March 17, 2000	2–4	@ Washington Capitals (1999–2000)	30–31–10–0	14,908	L
72	March 18, 2000	2–3	@ Montreal Canadiens (1999–2000)	30–32–10–0	21,273	L
73	March 21, 2000	5–0	@ New Jersey Devils (1999–2000)	31–32–10–0	13,809	W
74	March 22, 2000	1–2	St. Louis Blues (1999–2000)	31–33–10–0	13,014	L
75	March 26, 2000	4–1	New York Islanders (1999–2000)	32–33–10–0	11,406	W
76	March 27, 2000	1–5	Buffalo Sabres (1999–2000)	32–34–10–0	15,395	L
77	March 29, 2000	3–1	Nashville Predators (1999–2000)	33–34–10–0	14,055	W
78	March 31, 2000	3–1	@ Buffalo Sabres (1999–2000)	34–34–10–0	18,690	W

April: 3–1–0–0 (home: 2–0–0–0; road: 1–1–0–0)

Game	Date	Score	Opponent	Record	Attendance	Recap
79	April 2, 2000	1–0	Philadelphia Flyers (1999–2000)	35–34–10–0	17,075	W
80	April 3, 2000	2–3	@ Pittsburgh Penguins (1999–2000)	35–35–10–0	16,958	L
81	April 8, 2000	4–3	@ Atlanta Thrashers (1999–2000)	36–35–10–0	18,612	W
82	April 9, 2000	2–1	Atlanta Thrashers (1999–2000)	37–35–10–0	14,284	W

Legend: W Win (2 points) L Loss (0 points) T Tie (1 point) OTL Overtime loss (1 point)

== Player statistics ==
=== Scoring ===
- Position abbreviations: C = Center; D = Defense; G = Goaltender; LW = Left wing; RW = Right wing
- † = Joined team via a transaction (e.g., trade, waivers, signing) during the season. Stats reflect time with the Hurricanes only.
- ‡ = Left team via a transaction (e.g., trade, waivers, release) during the season. Stats reflect time with the Hurricanes only.

No.	Player	Pos	Regular season					
No.	Player	Pos	GP	G	A	Pts	+/-	PIM
21	Ron Francis	C	78	23	50	73	10	18
92	Jeff O'Neill	RW	80	25	38	63	−9	72
10	Gary Roberts	LW	69	23	30	53	−10	62
24	Sami Kapanen	RW	76	24	24	48	10	12
22	Sean Hill	D	62	13	31	44	3	59
18	Robert Kron	LW	81	13	27	40	−4	8
77	Paul Coffey	D	69	11	29	40	−6	40
51	Andrei Kovalenko	RW	76	15	24	39	−13	38
13	Bates Battaglia	LW	77	16	18	34	20	39
23	Martin Gelinas	LW	81	14	16	30	−10	40
28	Paul Ranheim	LW	79	9	13	22	−14	6
2	Glen Wesley	D	78	7	15	22	−4	38
27	Rod Brind'Amour†	C	33	4	10	14	−12	22
5	Marek Malik	D	57	4	10	14	13	63
16	Tommy Westlund	RW	81	4	8	12	−10	19
14	Steven Halko	D	58	0	8	8	0	25
17	Jeff Daniels	LW	69	3	4	7	−8	10
33	Dave Karpa	D	27	1	4	5	9	52
44	Kent Manderville‡	C	56	1	4	5	−8	12
45	David Tanabe	D	31	4	0	4	−4	14
4	Nolan Pratt	D	64	3	1	4	−22	90
7	Curtis Leschyshyn	D	53	0	2	2	−19	14
15	Byron Ritchie	C	26	0	2	2	−10	17
1	Arturs Irbe	G	75	0	1	1		14
35	Eric Fichaud‡	G	9	0	0	0		2
30	Mark Fitzpatrick	G	3	0	0	0		0
20	Sandy McCarthy†	RW	13	0	0	0	2	9
25	Shane Willis	RW	2	0	0	0	−1	0

=== Goaltending ===
- ‡ = Left team via a transaction (e.g., trade, waivers, release) during the season. Stats reflect time with the Hurricanes only.

No.	Player	Regular season									
No.	Player	GP	W	L	T	SA	GA	GAA	SV%	SO	TOI
1	Arturs Irbe	75	34	28	9	1858	175	2.42	.906	5	4345
35	Eric Fichaud‡	9	3	5	1	206	24	2.94	.883	1	490
30	Mark Fitzpatrick	3	0	2	0	68	8	4.49	.882	0	107

== Awards and records ==
=== Awards ===
Type	Award/honor	Recipient	Ref
League (in-season)	NHL All-Star Game selection	Sami Kapanen	
League (in-season)	NHL Player of the Week	Arturs Irbe (April 3)	
Team	Steve Chiasson Award	Sean Hill	

=== Milestones ===
Milestone	Player	Date	Ref
First game	Tommy Westlund	October 2, 1999	
First game	David Tanabe	October 11, 1999	

== Draft picks ==
Carolina's picks at the 1999 NHL Entry Draft in Boston, Massachusetts. The Hurricanes had the 16th overall pick.

Round	#	Player	Position	Nationality	College/Junior/Club team
1	16	David Tanabe	D	United States	University of Wisconsin–Madison (WCHA)
2	49	Brett Lysak	C	Canada	Regina Pats (WHL)
3	84	Brad Fast	D	Canada	Prince George Spruce Kings (BCHL)
4	113	Ryan Murphy	LW	United States	Bowling Green University (NCAA)
6	174	Damian Surma	LW	United States	Plymouth Whalers (OHL)
7	202	Jim Baxter	RW	Canada	Oshawa Generals (OHL)
8	231	David Evans	RW	United States	Clarkson University (ECAC)
8	237	Antti Jokela	G	Finland	Lukko (Finland)
9	259	Yevgeni Kurilin	C	Belarus	Anchorage Aces (WCHL)

== Farm teams ==
=== International Hockey League ===
The Cincinnati Cyclones were the Hurricanes International Hockey League affiliate for the 1999–2000 IHL season.

=== East Coast Hockey League ===
The Florida Everblades were the Hurricanes East Coast Hockey League affiliate.
