= Alexandre Boikov =

Russian ice hockey player (born 1975)

- Born: February 7, 1975 (age 51) Chelyabinsk, Russian SFSR, Soviet Union
- Height: 6 ft 0 in (183 cm)
- Weight: 207 lb (94 kg; 14 st 11 lb)
- Position: Defenceman
- Shot: Left
- Played for: Nashville Predators; Metallurg Magnitogorsk; Salavat Yulaev Ufa; Torpedo Nizhny Novgorod; HC MVD; Dynamo Moscow
- NHL draft: Undrafted
- Playing career: 1996–2014

Alexandre Vladimirovich Boikov (born February 7, 1975) is a Russian former professional ice hockey defenceman. He most recently played for Dynamo Moscow of the Kontinental Hockey League (KHL).

== Playing career ==
Undrafted, and after playing for three different teams in the Western Hockey League, the Boikov was signed by the San Jose Sharks on April 22, 1996. However, it was not until signing with the Nashville Predators that he would make his National Hockey League (NHL) debut. Boikov played a total of 10 NHL games over short stints in the 1999–2000 and 2000–01 seasons.

Boikov returned to Russia in 2002 to play the next four seasons for Metallurg Magnitogorsk in the Russian Super League.

== Career statistics ==
=== Regular season and playoffs ===
			Regular season					Playoffs
Season	Team	League	GP	G	A	Pts	PIM	GP	G	A	Pts	PIM
1993–94	Victoria Cougars	WHL	70	4	31	35	250	—	—	—	—	—
1994–95	Prince George Cougars	WHL	46	5	23	28	115	—	—	—	—	—
1994–95	Tri-City Americans	WHL	24	3	13	16	63	17	1	7	8	30
1995–96	Tri-City Americans	WHL	71	3	49	52	230	11	2	4	6	28
1996–97	Kentucky Thoroughblades	AHL	61	1	19	20	182	4	0	1	1	4
1997–98	Kentucky Thoroughblades	AHL	69	5	14	19	153	3	0	1	1	8
1998–99	Kentucky Thoroughblades	AHL	55	5	13	18	116	—	—	—	—	—
1998–99	Rochester Americans	AHL	13	0	1	1	15	17	1	3	4	24
1999–00	Milwaukee Admirals	IHL	58	1	6	7	120	—	—	—	—	—
1999–00	Nashville Predators	NHL	2	0	0	0	2	—	—	—	—	—
2000–01	Milwaukee Admirals	IHL	56	2	11	13	147	5	2	1	3	0
2000–01	Nashville Predators	NHL	8	0	0	0	13	—	—	—	—	—
2001–02	Milwaukee Admirals	AHL	56	4	6	10	102	—	—	—	—	—
2002–03	Metallurg Magnitogorsk	RSL	43	2	3	5	70	3	0	0	0	2
2003–04	Metallurg Magnitogorsk	RSL	41	3	3	6	66	7	0	0	0	4
2004–05	Metallurg Magnitogorsk	RSL	43	1	5	6	80	2	0	0	0	2
2005–06	Metallurg Magnitogorsk	RSL	37	0	5	5	62	9	1	0	1	4
2006–07	Salavat Yulaev Ufa	RSL	41	2	17	19	90	8	1	1	2	10
2007–08	Salavat Yulaev Ufa	RSL	36	3	1	4	63	6	0	0	0	8
2008–09	Torpedo Nizhny Novgorod	KHL	30	0	6	6	58	—	—	—	—	—
2009–10	HC MVD	KHL	44	1	9	10	78	14	0	1	1	20
2010–11	Dynamo Moscow	KHL	20	0	1	1	34	—	—	—	—	—
2011–12	Dynamo Moscow	KHL	41	1	6	7	50	10	0	1	1	4
2012–13	Dynamo Moscow	KHL	8	0	2	2	8	—	—	—	—	—
2013–14	Dynamo Moscow	KHL	13	1	2	3	22	—	—	—	—	—
NHL totals			10	0	0	0	15	—	—	—	—	—
RSL totals			254	15	53	68	568	35	2	1	3	30
KHL totals			156	3	26	29	250	24	0	2	2	24

Medal record

Ice hockey

Representing Russia

World Junior Championship
Silver medal – second place	1995 Red Deer	

=== International ===
Year	Team	Event	Result	GP	G	A	Pts	PIM
1995	Russia	WJC	2nd place, silver medalist(s)	7	0	0	0	0
Junior totals				7	0	0	0	0
