= 1999–2000 New York Rangers season =

NHL hockey team season

1999–2000 New York Rangers
- Division: 4th Atlantic
- Conference: 11th Eastern
- 1999–2000 record: 29–38–12–3
- Home record: 15–20–5–1
- Road record: 14–18–7–2
- Goals for: 218
- Goals against: 246

Team information
- General manager: Neil Smith (Oct.–Mar.)
- Coach: John Muckler (Oct.–Mar.); John Tortorella (Mar.–Apr.)
- Captain: Brian Leetch
- Arena: Madison Square Garden
- Average attendance: 18,200
- Minor league affiliates: Hartford Wolf Pack; Charlotte Checkers

Team leaders
- Goals: Mike York (26)
- Assists: Theoren Fleury (49)
- Points: Petr Nedved (68)
- Penalty minutes: Mathieu Schneider (78)
- Plus/minus: Jan Hlavac (+3)
- Wins: Mike Richter (22)
- Goals against average: Mike Richter (2.87)

The 1999–2000 New York Rangers season was the franchise's 74th season. In the regular season, the Rangers finished in fourth place in the Atlantic Division with a 29–38–12–3 record. New York failed to qualify for the Stanley Cup playoffs for the third straight season for the first time since the 1963–64 to 1965–66 seasons.

For the second time in three seasons, the Rangers fired their head coach during the regular season. John Muckler, who took the position after Colin Campbell's firing in 1997–98, was himself fired with four games left in the season. General manager Neil Smith was also fired, bringing an end to his tenure which had seen the Rangers win the Stanley Cup but also fall on hard times.

== Regular season ==
=== Final standings ===
Atlantic Division
No.	CR		GP	W	L	T	OTL	GF	GA	Pts
1	1	**Philadelphia Flyers**	82	45	22	12	3	237	179	105
2	4	**New Jersey Devils**	82	45	24	8	5	251	203	103
3	7	**Pittsburgh Penguins**	82	37	31	8	6	241	236	88
4	11	New York Rangers	82	29	38	12	3	218	246	73
5	13	New York Islanders	82	24	48	9	1	194	275	58

Note: CR = Conference rank; GP = Games played; W = Wins; L = Losses; T = Ties; OTL=Overtime loss; GF = Goals for; GA = Goals against; PIM=Penalties in Minutes; Pts = Points
Bolded teams qualified for the playoffs.

Eastern Conference
R		Div	GP	W	L	T	OTL	GF	GA	Pts
**1**	**z – Philadelphia Flyers**	**AT**	**82**	**45**	**22**	**12**	**3**	**237**	**179**	105
**2**	**y – Washington Capitals**	**SE**	**82**	**44**	**24**	**12**	**2**	**227**	**194**	102
**3**	**y – Toronto Maple Leafs**	**NE**	**82**	**45**	**27**	**7**	**3**	**246**	**222**	100
**4**	**New Jersey Devils**	**AT**	**82**	**45**	**24**	**8**	**5**	**251**	**203**	103
**5**	**Florida Panthers**	**SE**	**82**	**43**	**27**	**6**	**6**	**244**	**209**	98
**6**	**Ottawa Senators**	**NE**	**82**	**41**	**28**	**11**	**2**	**244**	**210**	95
**7**	**Pittsburgh Penguins**	**AT**	**82**	**37**	**31**	**8**	**6**	**241**	**236**	88
**8**	**Buffalo Sabres**	**NE**	**82**	**35**	**32**	**11**	**4**	**213**	**204**	85
8.5
9	Carolina Hurricanes	SE	82	37	35	10	0	217	216	84
10	Montreal Canadiens	NE	82	35	34	9	4	196	194	83
11	New York Rangers	AT	82	29	38	12	3	218	246	73
12	Boston Bruins	NE	82	24	33	19	6	210	248	73
13	New York Islanders	AT	82	24	48	9	1	194	275	58
14	Tampa Bay Lightning	SE	82	19	47	9	7	204	310	54
15	Atlanta Thrashers	SE	82	14	57	7	4	170	313	39

Divisions: AT – Atlantic, NE – Northeast, SE – Southeast

bold – Qualified for playoffs; z – Won conference; y – Won division

== Schedule and results ==
1999–2000 regular season
October: 4–7–2–0 (home: 3–5–0–0; road: 1–2–2–0)

Game	Date	Opponent	Score	Record	Recap
1	October 1, 1999	@ Edmonton Oilers	1–1 OT	0–0–1–0	T
2	October 2, 1999	@ Vancouver Canucks	2–1	0–1–1–0	L
3	October 5, 1999	Ottawa Senators	2–1	0–2–1–0	L
4	October 8, 1999	Carolina Hurricanes	3–1	1–2–1–0	W
5	October 10, 1999	Phoenix Coyotes	4–2	2–2–1–0	W
6	October 11, 1999	@ New York Islanders	4–2	3–2–1–0	W
7	October 14, 1999	Pittsburgh Penguins	5–2	3–3–1–0	L
8	October 17, 1999	Atlanta Thrashers	4–1	4–3–1–0	W
9	October 19, 1999	San Jose Sharks	2–1	4–4–1–0	L
10	October 20, 1999	@ Philadelphia Flyers	5–0	4–5–1–0	L
11	October 22, 1999	Philadelphia Flyers	2–0	4–6–1–0	L
12	October 24, 1999	Vancouver Canucks	3–0	4–7–1–0	L
13	October 30, 1999	@ Montreal Canadiens	2–2 OT	4–7–2–0	T

November: 3–5–1–1 (home: 0–2–1–0; road: 3–3–0–1)

Game	Date	Opponent	Score	Record	Recap
14	November 3, 1999	New York Islanders	3–3 OT	4–7–3–0	T
15	November 5, 1999	@ Colorado Avalanche	4–1	4–8–3–0	L
16	November 7, 1999	@ Chicago Blackhawks	3–1	5–8–3–0	W
17	November 10, 1999	Ottawa Senators	4–3	5–9–3–0	L
18	November 11, 1999	@ Washington Capitals	5–4 OT	6–9–3–0	W
19	November 13, 1999	Boston Bruins	5–2	6–10–3–0	L
20	November 18, 1999	@ Boston Bruins	5–3	6–11–3–0	L
21	November 20, 1999	@ Toronto Maple Leafs	4–3 OT	6–11–3–1	OTL
22	November 24, 1999	@ Tampa Bay Lightning	6–3	7–11–3–1	W
23	November 26, 1999	@ Florida Panthers	6–2	7–12–3–1	L

December: 5–3–3–2 (home: 5–1–1–1; road: 0–2–2–1)

Game	Date	Opponent	Score	Record	Recap
24	December 1, 1999	@ New Jersey Devils	3–2	7–13–3–1	L
25	December 3, 1999	Montreal Canadiens	3–2	8–13–3–1	W
26	December 4, 1999	@ Buffalo Sabres	1–1 OT	8–13–4–1	T
27	December 6, 1999	Calgary Flames	3–2 OT	9–13–4–1	W
28	December 8, 1999	Edmonton Oilers	2–1 OT	10–13–4–1	W
29	December 15, 1999	Los Angeles Kings	8–3	11–13–4–1	W
30	December 17, 1999	Washington Capitals	3–2 OT	11–13–4–2	OTL
31	December 19, 1999	Tampa Bay Lightning	5–4 OT	12–13–4–2	W
32	December 21, 1999	Buffalo Sabres	3–1	12–14–4–2	L
33	December 23, 1999	@ New York Islanders	4–2	12–15–4–2	L
34	December 26, 1999	New Jersey Devils	3–3 OT	12–15–5–2	T
35	December 28, 1999	@ Phoenix Coyotes	2–2 OT	12–15–6–2	T
36	December 29, 1999	@ Dallas Stars	4–3 OT	12–15–6–3	OTL

January: 10–4–1–0 (home: 4–2–0–0; road: 6–2–1–0)

Game	Date	Opponent	Score	Record	Recap
37	January 2, 2000	@ Montreal Canadiens	2–2 OT	12–15–7–3	T
38	January 3, 2000	St. Louis Blues	5–2	12–16–7–3	L
39	January 5, 2000	Toronto Maple Leafs	3–2 OT	13–16–7–3	W
40	January 8, 2000	@ Toronto Maple Leafs	5–3	14–16–7–3	W
41	January 9, 2000	@ Carolina Hurricanes	1–0	14–17–7–3	L
42	January 15, 2000	@ New York Islanders	5–2	15–17–7–3	W
43	January 16, 2000	Atlanta Thrashers	6–3	16–17–7–3	W
44	January 18, 2000	Carolina Hurricanes	3–2	17–17–7–3	W
45	January 20, 2000	@ Carolina Hurricanes	4–1	18–17–7–3	W
46	January 22, 2000	@ St. Louis Blues	4–1	19–17–7–3	W
47	January 24, 2000	@ Atlanta Thrashers	6–3	20–17–7–3	W
48	January 25, 2000	@ Pittsburgh Penguins	4–3	21–17–7–3	W
49	January 27, 2000	Toronto Maple Leafs	4–3	21–18–7–3	L
50	January 29, 2000	@ Ottawa Senators	3–2	21–19–7–3	L
51	January 31, 2000	Nashville Predators	5–1	22–19–7–3	W

February: 4–7–2–0 (home: 2–4–1–0; road: 2–3–1–0)

Game	Date	Opponent	Score	Record	Recap
52	February 2, 2000	New Jersey Devils	3–1	22–20–7–3	L
53	February 3, 2000	@ Atlanta Thrashers	6–3	23–20–7–3	W
54	February 8, 2000	New Jersey Devils	2–2 OT	23–20–8–3	T
55	February 9, 2000	@ New Jersey Devils	4–1	23–21–8–3	L
56	February 11, 2000	Boston Bruins	5–2	24–21–8–3	W
57	February 13, 2000	New York Islanders	4–2	24–22–8–3	L
58	February 15, 2000	@ Tampa Bay Lightning	2–2 OT	24–22–9–3	T
59	February 16, 2000	@ Florida Panthers	3–0	24–23–9–3	L
60	February 18, 2000	Colorado Avalanche	4–2	24–24–9–3	L
61	February 20, 2000	Philadelphia Flyers	3–2	24–25–9–3	L
62	February 22, 2000	Pittsburgh Penguins	4–3	25–25–9–3	W
63	February 25, 2000	@ Buffalo Sabres	6–3	26–25–9–3	W
64	February 26, 2000	@ Ottawa Senators	4–2	26–26–9–3	L

March: 3–9–2–0 (home: 1–4–2–0; road: 2–5–0–0)

Game	Date	Opponent	Score	Record	Recap
65	March 1, 2000	Buffalo Sabres	3–3 OT	26–26–10–3	T
66	March 3, 2000	Florida Panthers	4–2	27–26–10–3	W
67	March 6, 2000	@ San Jose Sharks	2–1	27–27–10–3	L
68	March 8, 2000	@ Mighty Ducks of Anaheim	4–3 OT	28–27–10–3	W
69	March 9, 2000	@ Los Angeles Kings	3–1	28–28–10–3	L
70	March 11, 2000	@ Pittsburgh Penguins	3–1	28–29–10–3	L
71	March 13, 2000	Dallas Stars	4–3	28–30–10–3	L
72	March 15, 2000	Tampa Bay Lightning	4–4 OT	28–30–11–3	T
73	March 18, 2000	@ Philadelphia Flyers	3–2	29–30–11–3	W
74	March 19, 2000	@ Pittsburgh Penguins	5–4	29–31–11–3	L
75	March 21, 2000	Florida Panthers	4–3	29–32–11–3	L
76	March 23, 2000	Washington Capitals	4–1	29–33–11–3	L
77	March 26, 2000	@ Detroit Red Wings	8–2	29–34–11–3	L
78	March 27, 2000	Detroit Red Wings	6–0	29–35–11–3	L

April: 0–3–1–0 (home: 0–2–0–0; road: 0–1–1–0)

Game	Date	Opponent	Score	Record	Recap
79	April 1, 2000	@ Boston Bruins	2–2 OT	29–35–12–3	T
80	April 3, 2000	@ Washington Capitals	4–1	29–36–12–3	L
81	April 5, 2000	Montreal Canadiens	3–0	29–37–12–3	L
82	April 9, 2000	Philadelphia Flyers	4–1	29–38–12–3	L

Legend: W Win (2 points) L Loss (0 points) T Tie (1 point) OTL Overtime loss (1 point)

== Player statistics ==
=== Scoring ===
- Position abbreviations: C = Center; D = Defense; G = Goaltender; LW = Left wing; RW = Right wing
- † = Joined team via a transaction (e.g., trade, waivers, signing) during the season. Stats reflect time with the Rangers only.
- ‡ = Left team via a transaction (e.g., trade, waivers, release) during the season. Stats reflect time with the Rangers only.

No.	Player	Pos	Regular season					
No.	Player	Pos	GP	G	A	Pts	+/-	PIM
93	Petr Nedved	C	76	24	44	68	2	40
14	Theoren Fleury	RW	80	15	49	64	−4	68
18	Mike York	C	82	26	24	50	−17	18
27	Jan Hlavac	LW	67	19	23	42	3	16
15	John MacLean	RW	77	18	24	42	−2	52
9	Adam Graves	LW	77	23	17	40	−15	14
20	Radek Dvorak†	RW	46	11	22	33	0	10
13	Valeri Kamensky	LW	65	14	20	34	−18	36
21	Mathieu Schneider	D	80	10	20	30	−6	78
12	Alexandre Daigle†	RW	58	8	18	26	−5	23
2	Brian Leetch	D	50	7	19	26	−16	20
4	Kevin Hatcher	D	74	4	19	23	−10	38
3	Kim Johnsson	D	76	6	15	21	−13	46
26	Tim Taylor	C	76	9	11	20	−4	72
5	Stephane Quintal	D	75	2	14	16	−10	77
22	Mike Knuble‡	RW	59	9	5	14	−5	18
28	Eric Lacroix	LW	70	4	8	12	−12	24
24	Sylvain Lefebvre	D	82	2	10	12	−13	43
17	Kevin Stevens	LW	38	3	5	8	−7	43
10	Todd Harvey‡	RW	31	3	3	6	−9	62
16	Rob DiMaio†	RW	12	1	3	4	−8	8
47	Rich Pilon†	D	45	0	4	4	0	36
29	Johan Witehall	LW	9	1	1	2	0	2
22	Jason Dawe†	RW	3	0	1	1	0	2
25	Jason Doig	D	7	0	1	1	−2	22
19	Darren Langdon	LW	21	0	1	1	−2	26
30	Kirk McLean	G	22	0	1	1		2
32 (Note: Stock wore number 20 in his first five games.)	P. J. Stock	C	11	0	1	1	1	11
37	Derek Armstrong	C	1	0	0	0	0	0
39	Daniel Goneau	LW	1	0	0	0	−1	0
32	Milan Hnilicka	G	2	0	0	0		0
29	Chris Kenady	RW	2	0	0	0	−1	0
31	Jean-Francois Labbe	G	1	0	0	0		0
6	Manny Malhotra	C	27	0	0	0	−6	4
45	Dale Purinton	D	1	0	0	0	−1	7
35	Mike Richter	G	61	0	0	0		4
36	Alexei Vasiliev	D	1	0	0	0	−1	2
32	Terry Virtue	D	1	0	0	0	−2	0

=== Goaltending ===
No.	Player	Regular season									
No.	Player	GP	W	L	T	SA	GA	GAA	SV%	SO	TOI
35	Mike Richter	61	22	31	8	1988	173	2.87	.905	0	3622
30	Kirk McLean	22	7	8	4	616	58	2.89	.896	0	1206
32	Milan Hnilicka	2	0	1	0	49	5	3.49	.886	0	86
31	Jean-Francois Labbe	1	0	1	0	25	3	3.00	.864	0	60

== Awards and records ==
=== Awards ===
Type	Award/honor	Recipient	Ref
League (annual)	NHL All-Rookie Team	Mike York (Forward)	
League (annual)	NHL Foundation Player Award	Adam Graves	
League (in-season)	NHL All-Star Game selection	Mike Richter	
League (in-season)	NHL Player of the Week	Mike Richter (January 24)	
Team	Ceil Saidel Memorial Award	Adam Graves	
Team	Frank Boucher Trophy	Mike Richter	
Team	Good Guy Award	Tim Taylor	
Team	Lars-Erik Sjoberg Award	Kim Johnsson	
Team	Players' Player Award	Mike Richter	
Team	Rangers MVP	Mike Richter	
Team	Rookie of the Year	Mike York	
Team	Steven McDonald Extra Effort Award	Adam Graves	

=== Milestones ===
Milestone	Player	Date	Ref
First game	Kim Johnsson	October 1, 1999	
First game	Mike York	October 1, 1999	
First game	Jan Hlavac	October 2, 1999	
First game	Milan Hnilicka	October 14, 1999	
First game	Jean-Francois Labbe	April 5, 2000	
First game	Alexei Vasiliev	April 5, 2000	
First game	Dale Purinton	April 9, 2000	
500th game played	Mike Richter	October 30, 1999	
400th goal	John MacLean	January 20, 2000	

== Draft picks ==
New York's picks at the 1999 NHL entry draft in Boston, Massachusetts, at the FleetCenter.

Round	#	Player	Position	Nationality	College/Junior/Club team (League)
1	4	Pavel Brendl	RW	Czech Republic	Calgary Hitmen (WHL)
1	9	Jamie Lundmark	C	Canada	Moose Jaw Warriors (WHL)
2	59	David Inman	LW	Canada	University of Notre Dame (CCHA)
3	79	Johan Asplund	G	Sweden	Brynäs IF (Sweden)
3	90	Patrick Aufiero	D	United States	Boston University (Hockey East)
5	137	Garret Bembridge	RW	Canada	Saskatoon Blades (WHL)
6	177	Jay Dardis	C	United States	Proctor Academy (USHS–NH)
7	197	Arto Laatikainen	D	Finland	Blues (Finland)
8	226	Yevgeni Gusakov	LW	Russia	Lada Togliatti-2 (Russia)
9	251	Petter Henning	RW	Sweden	Modo Hockey (Sweden)
9	254	Alexei Bulatov	LW	Russia	Dinamo-Energija Yekaterinburg (Russia)

== See also ==
- 1999–2000 NHL season
