= 2000 National Hockey League All-Star Game =

Professional ice hockey exhibition game

2000 NHL All-Star Game
	1	2	3	Total
World	3	2	4	9
North America	2	2	0	4
- Date: February 6, 2000
- Arena: Air Canada Centre
- City: Toronto
- MVP: Pavel Bure (Florida)
- Attendance: 19,300

The 2000 NHL All-Star Game was the 50th All-Star Game in the National Hockey League. It took place on February 6, 2000, at Air Canada Centre in Toronto, home to the Toronto Maple Leafs. The last time Toronto hosted prior was the 1968 NHL All-Star Game. The 1st NHL All-Star Game took place in 1947 and was also hosted by Toronto.

The All-Star week festivities saw the Canadian Hockey League Top Prospects Game played on February 2, and an exhibition game between the Canadian and American women's national teams on February 3. The Heroes of Hockey game and the Skills Competition were held on February 5. It is to note that the opening face-off for the Heroes of Hockey game were Ted Lindsay and Fleming Mackell, two players who played in the 1st All-Star Game.

Wayne Gretzky had retired the previous year, and the NHL announced they would retire his jersey number, 99, for every team in the league, a promise fulfilled in a pre-game ceremony at the 2000 All-Star Game. A banner with his name and number in the colors of his Edmonton Oilers team, blue and orange, was raised to the rafters, after which he performed a ceremonial puck drop between Paul Kariya of Team North America and Jaromir Jagr of Team World. The NHL was inspired to honor Gretzky in this way by Major League Baseball retiring Jackie Robinson's number 42.

Gretzky also made it clear that he would not partake in any old-timer or Heroes of Hockey game unless it was held in Edmonton, a statement that was realized with the 2003 Heritage Classic three years later.

== Super Skills Competition ==
In the Skills Competition, the World All-Stars would win their third-straight skills competition. In the individual events, the Boston Bruins' Ray Bourque and Florida Panthers' Viktor Kozlov shared the Accuracy Shot event, which was Bourque's seventh victory in the event. In addition, the St. Louis Blues' Al MacInnis won his fourth-straight Hardest Shot event, which was also his sixth all-time victory in the event, and the Mighty Ducks of Anaheim's Paul Kariya would win his second-straight Puck Control Relay event.

=== Individual event winners ===
- Puck Control Relay – Paul Kariya (Mighty Ducks of Anaheim)
- Fastest Skater – Sami Kapanen (Carolina Hurricanes) - 13.649 seconds
- Accuracy Shooting – Ray Bourque (Boston Bruins)/ Viktor Kozlov (Florida Panthers) - 4 hits, 5 shots
- Hardest Shot – Al MacInnis (St. Louis Blues) - 100.1 mph
- Goaltenders Competition – Mike Richter (New York Rangers) - 2 GA, 16 shots

== Uniforms ==
Since 1951, the NHL had mandated that one team in each game must wear a white jersey to contrast with the other team's dark jersey. The only exceptions to this point had been when a team opted to wear gold in lieu of white. However, for the 2000 All-Star Game, the NHL opted to experiment with a color-vs.-color format with uniforms by CCM. The North American All-Stars were clad in a navy blue uniform with white shoulders and sleeves, and the wishbone collar design previously introduced by Nike, while the World All-Stars wore red with white shoulders and sleeves, and a faux polo-style collar. The goaltenders, however, wore white jerseys with their teams' primary colors on the shoulders and sleeves. Both teams featured a white stripe across the chest (team color in the case of the goalies), with the NHL shield appearing on the player's left side, and the uniform number placed below it. The World team also featured names below the numbers on the back instead of above the numbers, which would normally be considered a violation of the NHL's uniform code (which requires the player's name to be above the back number). The names and numbers were rendered in the Handel Gothic typeface.

The uniform design would be reused for the next All-Star Game, with the Toronto All-Star Game and NHL 2000 patches replaced with the Colorado All-Star patch.

Referees Kerry Fraser and Don Koharski were also clad in special sweaters for the game. A vertical orange stripe was added to the left side of their jerseys in order to help further distinguish the referees and linesmen. The jersey design was never used again.

== The game ==
The Florida Panthers' Pavel Bure and his brother, the Calgary Flames' Valeri Bure, combined for six points (Pavel 3–1–4, Valeri 0–2–2) to lead the World All-Stars to their first All-Star Game victory over the North American All-Stars. Valeri would assist on two of Pavel's three goals to become the first brother combination to set up a goal, since the 1956 All-Star Game when Maurice and Henri Richard hooked up for an All-Star goal. Pavel Bure would become the first Russian-born player to win All-Star MVP honors.

== Boxscore ==
	North America	World
Final score	4	9
Head coach	(Canada) Pat Quinn (Toronto Maple Leafs)	(Canada) Scotty Bowman (Detroit Red Wings)
Assistant coach	(Canada) Roger Neilson (Philadelphia Flyers)	(Canada) Joel Quenneville (St. Louis Blues)
Lineup	Starting lineup: 4 - (Canada) D Rob Blake (Los Angeles Kings); 9 - (Canada) LW Paul Kariya (Mighty Ducks of Anaheim); 14 - (Canada) LW Brendan Shanahan (Detroit Red Wings); 19 - (Canada) C Steve Yzerman (Detroit Red Wings); 31 - (Canada) G Curtis Joseph (Toronto Maple Leafs); 44 - (Canada) D Chris Pronger (St. Louis Blues); Commissioner's selection: 11 - (Canada) C Mark Messier (Vancouver Canucks); Reserves: 2 - (Canada) D Al MacInnis (St. Louis Blues); 3 - (Canada) D Scott Stevens (New Jersey Devils); 6 - (United States) D Phil Housley (Calgary Flames); 8 - (Canada) RW Mark Recchi (Philadelphia Flyers); 10 - (United States) RW Tony Amonte (Chicago Blackhawks); 13 - (Canada) LW Owen Nolan (San Jose Sharks); 15 - (Canada) LW Ray Whitney (Florida Panthers); 16 - (United States) LW John LeClair (Philadelphia Flyers); 23 - (United States) C Scott Gomez (New Jersey Devils); 24 - (United States) D Chris Chelios (Detroit Red Wings); 27 - (United States) C Mike Modano (Dallas Stars); 30 - (Canada) G Martin Brodeur (New Jersey Devils); 35 - (United States) G Mike Richter (New York Rangers); 37 - (Canada) D Eric Desjardins (Philadelphia Flyers); 77 - (Canada) D Ray Bourque (Boston Bruins) - (C); 88 - (Canada) C Eric Lindros (Philadelphia Flyers); 91 - (Canada) C Joe Sakic (Colorado Avalanche); 97 - (United States) C Jeremy Roenick (Phoenix Coyotes)	Starting lineup: 1 - (Czech Republic) G Roman Turek (St. Louis Blues); 5 - (Sweden) D Nicklas Lidstrom (Detroit Red Wings) - (C); 8 - (Finland) RW Teemu Selanne (Mighty Ducks of Anaheim); 13 - (Sweden) C Mats Sundin (Toronto Maple Leafs); 18 - (Latvia) D Sandis Ozolinsh (Colorado Avalanche); 68 - (Czech Republic) RW Jaromir Jagr (Pittsburgh Penguins); Reserves: 2 - (Czech Republic) D Petr Buzek (Atlanta Thrashers); 10 - (Russia) LW Pavel Bure (Florida Panthers); 14 - (Czech Republic) C Radek Bonk (Ottawa Senators); 20 - (Russia) LW Valeri Bure (Calgary Flames); 22 - (Czech Republic) RW Milan Hejduk (Colorado Avalanche); 23 - (Czech Republic) D Petr Svoboda (Tampa Bay Lightning); 24 - (Finland) LW Sami Kapanen (Carolina Hurricanes); 25 - (Russia) RW Viktor Kozlov (Florida Panthers); 26 - (Czech Republic) LW Martin Rucinsky (Montreal Canadiens); 27 - (Finland) D Teppo Numminen (Phoenix Coyotes); 28 - (Poland) RW Mariusz Czerkawski (New York Islanders); 29 - (Czech Republic) LW Patrik Elias (New Jersey Devils); 35 - (Sweden) G Tommy Salo (Edmonton Oilers); 36 - (Russia) D Dmitry Yushkevich (Toronto Maple Leafs); 37 - (Germany) G Olaf Kolzig (Washington Capitals); 38 - (Slovakia) RW Pavol Demitra (St. Louis Blues); 56 - (Russia) D Sergei Zubov (Dallas Stars); 81 - (Slovakia) LW Miroslav Satan (Buffalo Sabres)
Scoring summary	Sakic (Whitney, Recchi) 13:56 first; Roenick (Modano) 19:30 first; Amonte (Modano, Bourque) 12:14 second; Whitney (Desjardins, Messier) 17:08 second	Demitra (Yushkevich, Elias) 3:12 first; Jagr (Rucinsky) 10:50 first; Yushkevich (Kozlov, P. Bure) 14:35 first; P. Bure (V. Bure) 0:33 second; P. Bure 2 (V. Bure, Kozlov) 8:38 second (GWG); Demitra (Hejduk, Elias) 8:52 third; P. Bure 3 (Lidstrom, Kozlov) 9:31 third; Satan (Czerkawski, Bonk) 10:51 third; Bonk (Jagr, Rucinsky) 19:28 third
Penalties	none	Ozolinsh, hooking 5:51 third
Shots on goal	13–11–8–32	20–13–15–48
Win/loss	L - Martin Brodeur	W - Tommy Salo

- Referees: Kerry Fraser, Don Koharski
- Linesmen: Gerard Gauthier, Ray Scapinello
- Television: ABC, CBC, SRC

== See also ==
- 1999–2000 NHL season

== Notes ==
- ^1 Dominik Hasek was voted as a starter, but was not able to play due to injury. Roman Turek was selected to replace Hasek as the starting goaltender.
- ^2 Pierre Turgeon was selected, but was not able to play due to injury. Ray Whitney was named as his replacement.
- ^3 Peter Forsberg was selected, but was not able to play due to injury. Patrik Elias was named as his replacement.
