= 1999–2000 Pittsburgh Penguins season =

NHL team season

1999–2000 Pittsburgh Penguins
- Division: 3rd Atlantic
- Conference: 7th Eastern
- 1999–2000 record: 37–31–8–6
- Home record: 23–11–7–0
- Road record: 14–20–1–6
- Goals for: 241
- Goals against: 236

Team information
- General manager: Craig Patrick
- Coach: Kevin Constantine (Oct.–Dec.); Herb Brooks (Dec.–May)
- Captain: Jaromir Jagr
- Alternate captains: Alexei Kovalev; Jiri Slegr; Martin Straka
- Arena: Mellon Arena
- Average attendance: 15,443
- Minor league affiliates: Wilkes-Barre/Scranton Penguins; Wheeling Nailers

Team leaders
- Goals: Jaromir Jagr (42)
- Assists: Jaromir Jagr (54)
- Points: Jaromir Jagr (96)
- Penalty minutes: Matthew Barnaby (197)
- Plus/minus: Jaromir Jagr (+25)
- Wins: Jean-Sebastien Aubin (23)
- Goals against average: Ron Tugnutt (2.41)

The 1999–2000 Pittsburgh Penguins season was the team's 33rd in the National Hockey League (NHL). It was the first season under ownership led by former superstar Mario Lemieux.

== Off-season ==
In June 1999, a U.S. Bankruptcy Court Judge granted former player Mario Lemieux ownership of the Penguins franchise, who were in danger of either relocating to Portland, Oregon, or folding. Lemieux received final approval of team ownership by NHL Commissioner Gary Bettman on September 3, 1999.

== Regular season ==
On April 7, 2000, Jaromir Jagr scored just 13 seconds into the overtime period to give the Penguins a 2–1 road win over the Buffalo Sabres. It would prove to be the fastest overtime goal scored during the 1999–2000 regular season.

=== Final standings ===
Atlantic Division
No.	CR		GP	W	L	T	OTL	GF	GA	Pts
1	1	**Philadelphia Flyers**	82	45	22	12	3	237	179	105
2	4	**New Jersey Devils**	82	45	24	8	5	251	203	103
3	7	**Pittsburgh Penguins**	82	37	31	8	6	241	236	88
4	11	New York Rangers	82	29	38	12	3	218	246	73
5	13	New York Islanders	82	24	48	9	1	194	275	58

Note: CR = Conference rank; GP = Games played; W = Wins; L = Losses; T = Ties; OTL=Overtime loss; GF = Goals for; GA = Goals against; PIM=Penalties in Minutes; Pts = Points
Bolded teams qualified for the playoffs.

Eastern Conference
R		Div	GP	W	L	T	OTL	GF	GA	Pts
**1**	**z – Philadelphia Flyers**	**AT**	**82**	**45**	**22**	**12**	**3**	**237**	**179**	105
**2**	**y – Washington Capitals**	**SE**	**82**	**44**	**24**	**12**	**2**	**227**	**194**	102
**3**	**y – Toronto Maple Leafs**	**NE**	**82**	**45**	**27**	**7**	**3**	**246**	**222**	100
**4**	**New Jersey Devils**	**AT**	**82**	**45**	**24**	**8**	**5**	**251**	**203**	103
**5**	**Florida Panthers**	**SE**	**82**	**43**	**27**	**6**	**6**	**244**	**209**	98
**6**	**Ottawa Senators**	**NE**	**82**	**41**	**28**	**11**	**2**	**244**	**210**	95
**7**	**Pittsburgh Penguins**	**AT**	**82**	**37**	**31**	**8**	**6**	**241**	**236**	88
**8**	**Buffalo Sabres**	**NE**	**82**	**35**	**32**	**11**	**4**	**213**	**204**	85
8.5
9	Carolina Hurricanes	SE	82	37	35	10	0	217	216	84
10	Montreal Canadiens	NE	82	35	34	9	4	196	194	83
11	New York Rangers	AT	82	29	38	12	3	218	246	73
12	Boston Bruins	NE	82	24	33	19	6	210	248	73
13	New York Islanders	AT	82	24	48	9	1	194	275	58
14	Tampa Bay Lightning	SE	82	19	47	9	7	204	310	54
15	Atlanta Thrashers	SE	82	14	57	7	4	170	313	39

Divisions: AT – Atlantic, NE – Northeast, SE – Southeast

bold – Qualified for playoffs; z – Won conference; y – Won division

== Schedule and results ==
=== Regular season ===
1999–2000 regular season
October: 2–3–3–1 (home: 0–1–2–0; road: 2–2–1–1), 8 points

#	Date	Visitor	Score	Home	Record	Points	Recap
1	October 1	Pittsburgh Penguins	4–6	Dallas Stars	0–1–0–0	0	L
2	October 7	Pittsburgh Penguins	7–5	New Jersey Devils	1–1–0–0	2	W
3	October 8	Colorado Avalanche	3–3	Pittsburgh Penguins	1–1–0–1	3	T
4	October 14	Pittsburgh Penguins	5–2	New York Rangers	2–1–0–1	5	W
5	October 16	Chicago Blackhawks	3–3	Pittsburgh Penguins	2–1–0–2	6	T
6	October 23	Carolina Hurricanes	3–2	Pittsburgh Penguins	2–2–0–2	6	L
7	October 27	Pittsburgh Penguins	1–2 OT	Mighty Ducks of Anaheim	2–2–1–2	7	OTL
8	October 28	Pittsburgh Penguins	3–5	Los Angeles Kings	2–3–1–2	7	L
9	October 30	Pittsburgh Penguins	1–1	San Jose Sharks	2–3–1–3	8	T

November: 6–5–0–2 (home: 5–2–0–0; road: 1–3–0–2), 14 points

#	Date	Visitor	Score	Home	Record	Points	Recap
10	November 2	Los Angeles Kings	5–4	Pittsburgh Penguins	2–4–1–3	8	L
11	November 4	Pittsburgh Penguins	1–2	Ottawa Senators	2–5–1–3	8	L
12	November 6	Tampa Bay Lightning	7–4	Pittsburgh Penguins	2–6–1–3	8	L
13	November 10	Montreal Canadiens	4–5	Pittsburgh Penguins	3–6–1–3	10	W
14	November 12	Pittsburgh Penguins	2–3 OT	Detroit Red Wings	3–6–2–3	11	OTL
15	November 13	Nashville Predators	2–6	Pittsburgh Penguins	4–6–2–3	13	W
16	November 16	Buffalo Sabres	2–3	Pittsburgh Penguins	5–6–2–3	15	W
17	November 18	Pittsburgh Penguins	1–2	Tampa Bay Lightning	5–7–2–3	15	L
18	November 20	Pittsburgh Penguins	1–2 OT	Florida Panthers	5–7–3–3	16	OTL
19	November 23	Toronto Maple Leafs	1–3	Pittsburgh Penguins	6–7–3–3	18	W
20	November 26	Ottawa Senators	0–5	Pittsburgh Penguins	7–7–3–3	20	W
21	November 27	Pittsburgh Penguins	3–5	Carolina Hurricanes	7–8–3–3	20	L
22	November 30	Pittsburgh Penguins	4–1	Buffalo Sabres	8–8–3–3	22	W

December: 8–4–0–2 (home: 5–2–0–0; road: 3–2–0–2), 18 points

#	Date	Visitor	Score	Home	Record	Points	Recap
23	December 2	San Jose Sharks	5–2	Pittsburgh Penguins	8–9–3–3	22	L
24	December 4	Pittsburgh Penguins	2–3 OT	Toronto Maple Leafs	8–9–4–3	23	OTL
25	December 7	Pittsburgh Penguins	1–2	New Jersey Devils	8–10–4–3	23	L
26	December 9	Washington Capitals	0–3	Pittsburgh Penguins	9–10–4–3	25	W
27	December 11	Phoenix Coyotes	2–4	Pittsburgh Penguins	10–10–4–3	27	W
28	December 14	Boston Bruins	2–4	Pittsburgh Penguins	11–10–4–3	29	W
29	December 15	Pittsburgh Penguins	6–3	Carolina Hurricanes	12–10–4–3	31	W
30	December 18	Florida Panthers	5–2	Pittsburgh Penguins	12–11–4–3	31	L
31	December 20	Pittsburgh Penguins	1–5	Montreal Canadiens	12–12–4–3	31	L
32	December 21	Pittsburgh Penguins	4–0	New York Islanders	13–12–4–3	33	W
33	December 23	Tampa Bay Lightning	3–4	Pittsburgh Penguins	14–12–4–3	35	W
34	December 26	Pittsburgh Penguins	4–2	Chicago Blackhawks	15–12–4–3	37	W
35	December 29	Pittsburgh Penguins	2–3 OT	Washington Capitals	15–12–5–3	38	OTL
36	December 30	New York Islanders	3–9	Pittsburgh Penguins	16–12–5–3	40	W

January: 5–8–1–0 (home: 4–3–1–0; road: 1–5–0–0), 11 points

#	Date	Visitor	Score	Home	Record	Points	Recap
37	January 2	Detroit Red Wings	3–4	Pittsburgh Penguins	17–12–5–3	42	W
38	January 5	New Jersey Devils	3–1	Pittsburgh Penguins	17–13–5–3	42	L
39	January 7	Toronto Maple Leafs	2–5	Pittsburgh Penguins	18–13–5–3	44	W
40	January 8	Pittsburgh Penguins	2–6	Philadelphia Flyers	18–14–5–3	44	L
41	January 12	Pittsburgh Penguins	1–3	Phoenix Coyotes	18–15–5–3	44	L
42	January 13	Pittsburgh Penguins	3–4	Colorado Avalanche	18–16–5–3	44	L
43	January 15	Pittsburgh Penguins	2–4	Nashville Predators	18–17–5–3	44	L
44	January 19	St. Louis Blues	1–3	Pittsburgh Penguins	19–17–5–3	46	W
45	January 22	Pittsburgh Penguins	2–4	Montreal Canadiens	19–18–5–3	46	L
46	January 23	Philadelphia Flyers	4–4	Pittsburgh Penguins	19–18–5–4	47	T
47	January 25	New York Rangers	4–3	Pittsburgh Penguins	19–19–5–4	47	L
48	January 27	Atlanta Thrashers	1–4	Pittsburgh Penguins	20–19–5–4	49	W
49	January 29	Mighty Ducks of Anaheim	7–1	Pittsburgh Penguins	20–20–5–4	49	L
50	January 31	Pittsburgh Penguins	2–1 OT	Atlanta Thrashers	21–20–5–4	51	W

February: 5–3–4–1 (home: 4–0–4–0; road: 1–3–0–1), 15 points

#	Date	Visitor	Score	Home	Record	Points	Recap
51	February 1	Washington Capitals	2–3	Pittsburgh Penguins	22–20–5–4	53	W
52	February 3	New York Islanders	2–4	Pittsburgh Penguins	23–20–5–4	55	W
53	February 9	Atlanta Thrashers	2–5	Pittsburgh Penguins	24–20–5–4	57	W
54	February 11	Edmonton Oilers	2–2	Pittsburgh Penguins	24–20–5–5	58	T
55	February 12	Pittsburgh Penguins	1–5	New York Islanders	24–21–5–5	58	L
56	February 14	Vancouver Canucks	0–3	Pittsburgh Penguins	25–21–5–5	60	W
57	February 16	Buffalo Sabres	1–1	Pittsburgh Penguins	25–21–5–6	61	T
58	February 19	Pittsburgh Penguins	2–1	Florida Panthers	26–21–5–6	63	W
59	February 21	Pittsburgh Penguins	1–2	Tampa Bay Lightning	26–22–5–6	63	L
60	February 22	Pittsburgh Penguins	3–4	New York Rangers	26–23–5–6	63	L
61	February 24	Pittsburgh Penguins	3–4 OT	Philadelphia Flyers	26–23–6–6	64	OTL
62	February 26	Boston Bruins	2–2	Pittsburgh Penguins	26–23–6–7	65	T
63	February 28	Ottawa Senators	1–1	Pittsburgh Penguins	26–23–6–8	66	T

March: 8–6–0–0 (home: 4–2–0–0; road: 4–4–0–0), 16 points

#	Date	Visitor	Score	Home	Record	Points	Recap
64	March 1	Pittsburgh Penguins	2–8	Calgary Flames	26–24–6–8	66	L
65	March 4	Pittsburgh Penguins	3–2	Edmonton Oilers	27–24–6–8	68	W
66	March 8	Montreal Canadiens	3–0	Pittsburgh Penguins	27–25–6–8	68	L
67	March 9	Pittsburgh Penguins	0–7	Ottawa Senators	27–26–6–8	68	L
68	March 11	New York Rangers	1–3	Pittsburgh Penguins	28–26–6–8	70	W
69	March 13	New Jersey Devils	3–2	Pittsburgh Penguins	28–27–6–8	70	L
70	March 16	Florida Panthers	2–4	Pittsburgh Penguins	29–27–6–8	72	W
71	March 18	Pittsburgh Penguins	2–3	Boston Bruins	29–28–6–8	72	L
72	March 19	New York Rangers	4–5	Pittsburgh Penguins	30–28–6–8	74	W
73	March 21	Pittsburgh Penguins	8–2	New York Islanders	31–28–6–8	76	W
74	March 24	Pittsburgh Penguins	5–3	Atlanta Thrashers	32–28–6–8	78	W
75	March 26	Pittsburgh Penguins	1–3	Philadelphia Flyers	32–29–6–8	78	L
76	March 28	New Jersey Devils	2–3	Pittsburgh Penguins	33–29–6–8	80	W
77	March 30	Pittsburgh Penguins	4–3 OT	Washington Capitals	34–29–6–8	82	W

April: 3–2–0–0 (home: 1–1–0–0; road: 2–1–0–0), 6 points

#	Date	Visitor	Score	Home	Record	Points	Recap
78	April 1	Philadelphia Flyers	3–2	Pittsburgh Penguins	34–30–6–8	82	L
79	April 3	Carolina Hurricanes	2–3	Pittsburgh Penguins	35–30–6–8	84	W
80	April 5	Pittsburgh Penguins	4–2	Toronto Maple Leafs	36–30–6–8	86	W
81	April 7	Pittsburgh Penguins	2–1 OT	Buffalo Sabres	37–30–6–8	88	W
82	April 9	Pittsburgh Penguins	1–3	Boston Bruins	37–31–6–8	88	L

Legend: W Win (2 points) L Loss (0 points) T Tie (1 point) OTL Overtime loss (1 point)

=== Playoffs ===
2000 Stanley Cup playoffs
Eastern Conference Quarterfinals vs. (2) Washington Capitals – Penguins win 4–1

Game	Date	Visitor	Score	Home	Series	Recap
1	April 13	Pittsburgh Penguins	7–0	Washington Capitals	1–0	W
2	April 15	Washington Capitals	1–2 OT	Pittsburgh Penguins	2–0	W
3	April 17	Washington Capitals	3–4	Pittsburgh Penguins	3–0	W
4	April 19	Pittsburgh Penguins	2–3	Washington Capitals	3–1	L
5	April 21	Pittsburgh Penguins	2–1	Washington Capitals	4–1	W

Eastern Conference Semifinals vs. (1) Philadelphia Flyers – Flyers win 4–2

Game	Date	Visitor	Score	Home	Series	Recap
1	April 27	Pittsburgh Penguins	2–0	Philadelphia Flyers	1–0	W
2	April 29	Pittsburgh Penguins	4–1	Philadelphia Flyers	2–0	W
3	May 2	Philadelphia Flyers	4–3 OT	Pittsburgh Penguins	2–1	L
4	May 4	Philadelphia Flyers	2–1 OT	Pittsburgh Penguins	2–2	L
5	May 7	Pittsburgh Penguins	3–6	Philadelphia Flyers	2–3	L
6	May 9	Philadelphia Flyers	2–1	Pittsburgh Penguins	2–4	L

Legend: W Win L Loss

== Player statistics ==
Skaters

Regular season
Player	GP	G	A	Pts	+/−	PIM
Jaromir Jagr	63	42	54	96	25	50
Alex Kovalev	82	26	40	66	-3	94
Robert Lang	78	23	42	65	-9	14
Martin Straka	71	20	39	59	24	26
Jan Hrdina	70	13	33	46	13	43
German Titov^{‡}	63	17	25	42	-3	34
Aleksey Morozov	68	12	19	31	12	14
Jiri Slegr	74	11	20	31	20	82
Matthew Barnaby	64	12	12	24	3	197
Rob Brown	50	10	13	23	-13	10
Tyler Wright	50	12	10	22	4	45
Michal Rozsival	75	4	17	21	11	48
Kip Miller^{‡}	44	4	15	19	-1	10
Darius Kasparaitis	73	3	12	15	-12	146
Hans Jonsson	68	3	11	14	-5	12
Pat Falloon^{†}	30	4	9	13	-2	10
Ian Moran	73	4	8	12	-10	28
Brad Werenka^{‡}	61	3	8	11	15	69
Josef Beranek^{†}	13	4	4	8	-6	18
Janne Laukkanen^{†}	11	1	7	8	3	12
Robert Dome	22	2	5	7	1	0
Andrew Ference	30	2	4	6	3	20
Tom Chorske	33	1	5	6	-2	2
Peter Popovic	54	1	5	6	-8	30
Stephen Leach	56	2	3	5	-11	24
John Slaney	29	1	4	5	-10	10
Martin Sonnenberg	14	1	2	3	0	0
Bob Boughner^{†}	11	1	0	1	2	69
Rene Corbet^{†}	4	1	0	1	-4	0
Daniel Trebil	3	1	0	1	2	0
Dennis Bonvie	28	0	0	0	-2	80
Sven Butenschon	3	0	0	0	3	0
Total		241	426	667	—	1,197

Playoffs
Player	GP	G	A	Pts	+/−	PIM
Jaromir Jagr	11	8	8	16	5	6
Jan Hrdina	9	4	8	12	9	2
Martin Straka	11	3	9	12	5	10
Robert Lang	11	3	3	6	-1	0
Janne Laukkanen	11	2	4	6	6	10
Alex Kovalev	11	1	5	6	-1	10
Jiri Slegr	10	2	3	5	5	19
Tyler Wright	11	3	1	4	0	17
Rob Brown	11	1	2	3	1	0
Josef Beranek	11	0	3	3	2	4
Rene Corbet	7	1	1	2	-2	9
Darius Kasparaitis	11	1	1	2	-3	10
Bob Boughner	11	0	2	2	6	15
Matthew Barnaby	11	0	2	2	-1	29
John Slaney	2	1	0	1	0	2
Pat Falloon	10	1	0	1	0	2
Ian Moran	11	0	1	1	0	2
Hans Jonsson	11	0	1	1	2	6
Peter Popovic	10	0	0	0	-2	10
Aleksey Morozov	5	0	0	0	-1	0
Michal Rozsival	2	0	0	0	0	4
Total		31	54	85	—	167

Goaltenders

Regular season
Player	GP	GS	TOI	W	L	T	GA	GAA	SA	SV%	SO	G	A	PIM
Jean-Sebastien Aubin	51	48	2788:50	23	21	3	120	2.58	1392	0.914	2	0	1	2
Tom Barrasso^{‡}	18	16	869:34	5	7	2	46	3.17	386	0.881	1	0	0	6
Peter Skudra	20	12	922:16	5	7	3	48	3.12	374	0.872	1	0	0	0
Ron Tugnutt^{†}	7	6	374:19	4	2	0	15	2.40	197	0.924	0	0	0	0
Total		82	4954:59	37	37	8	229	2.77	2349	0.903	4	0	1	8

Playoffs
Player	GP	GS	TOI	W	L	T	GA	GAA	SA	SV%	SO	G	A	PIM
Ron Tugnutt	11	11	746:03	6	5	0	22	1.77	398	0.945	2	0	0	2
Peter Skudra	1	0	20:00	0	0	0	1	3.00	11	0.909	0	0	0	0
Total		11	766:03	6	5	0	23	1.80	409	0.944	2	0	0	2

^{†}Denotes player spent time with another team before joining the Penguins. Stats reflect time with the Penguins only.
^{‡}Denotes player was traded mid-season. Stats reflect time with the Penguins only.

== Awards and records ==
=== Awards ===
Type	Award/honor	Recipient	Ref
League (annual)	Art Ross Trophy	Jaromir Jagr	
League (annual)	Lester B. Pearson Award	Jaromir Jagr	
League (annual)	Lester Patrick Trophy	Mario Lemieux	
League (annual)	Lester Patrick Trophy	Craig Patrick	
League (annual)	NHL First All-Star Team	Jaromir Jagr (Right wing)	
League (in-season)	NHL All-Star Game selection	Jaromir Jagr (Note: Jagr was voted to the starting lineup, earning more votes than any other player.)	
League (in-season)	NHL Player of the Month	Jaromir Jagr (November)	
League (in-season)	NHL Player of the Week	Jaromir Jagr (November 15)	
League (in-season)	NHL Player of the Week	Jean-Sebastien Aubin (February 21)	
Team	A. T. Caggiano Memorial Booster Club Award	Jean-Sebastien Aubin	
Team	Aldege "Baz" Bastien Memorial Good Guy Award	Rob Brown	
Team	Bob Johnson Memorial Badger Bob Award	Jiri Slegr	
Team	Leading Scorer Award	Jaromir Jagr	
Team	Michel Briere Memorial Rookie of the Year Trophy	Jean-Sebastien Aubin	
Team	Most Valuable Player Award	Jaromir Jagr	
Team	Players' Player Award	Martin Straka	
Team	The Edward J. DeBartolo Community Service Award	Matthew Barnaby	
Team	The Edward J. DeBartolo Community Service Award	Ian Moran	

=== Milestones ===
Milestone	Player	Date	Ref
First game	Andrew Ference	October 1, 1999	
First game	Michal Roszival	October 1, 1999	
First game	Hans Jonsson	October 14, 1999	

== Transactions ==
The Penguins have been involved in the following transactions during the 1999–2000 season:

=== Trades ===
September 30, 1999	To New York Rangers Kevin Hatcher	To Pittsburgh Penguins Peter Popovic
January 29, 2000	To Anaheim Ducks Kip Miller	To Pittsburgh Penguins 2000 9th round pick
March 13, 2000	To Nashville Predators Pavel Skrbek	To Pittsburgh Penguins Bob Boughner
March 14, 2000	To Edmonton Oilers German Titov	To Pittsburgh Penguins Josef Beranek
March 14, 2000	To Anaheim Ducks 2000 5th round pick	To Pittsburgh Penguins Dan Trebil
March 14, 2000	To Calgary Flames Brad Werenka	To Pittsburgh Penguins Rene Corbet; Tyler Moss
March 14, 2000	To Ottawa Senators Tom Barrasso	To Pittsburgh Penguins Janne Laukkanen; Ron Tugnutt

=== Free agents acquired ===
Player	Former team	Date
Tom Chorske	Calgary Flames	September 2, 1999
Dennis Bonvie	Philadelphia Flyers	September 20, 1999
Steve Leach	Phoenix Coyotes	October 19, 1999

=== Free agents lost ===
Player	New team	Date
Greg Andrusak	Toronto Maple Leafs	July 9, 1999
Brent Peterson	Nashville Predators	July 24, 1999
Brian Bonin	Vancouver Canucks	August 25, 1999
Dan Kesa	Tampa Bay Lightning	September 6, 1999
Ryan Savoia	HC Fribourg-Gotteron (Swiss)	February 21, 2000

=== Claimed via waivers ===
Date	Player	Previous team
February 4, 2000	Pat Falloon	Edmonton Oilers

=== Player signings ===
Player	Date
Jiri Slegr	August 2, 1999
Alexei Kovalev	August 10, 1999
Robert Lang	August 10, 1999
Ian Moran	August 12, 1999
Matthew Barnaby	August 12, 1999
Martin Straka	August 13, 1999
Tyler Wright	September 3, 1999
Jan Hrdina	September 6, 1999
Darius Kasparaitis	September 29, 1999
John Slaney	September 30, 1999
Milan Kraft	October 8, 1999
Tom Kostopoulos	October 8, 1999

=== Other ===
Name	Date	Notes
Ken Sawyer	September 7, 1999	Hired as CFO
Tom Rooney	September 7, 1999	Hired as COO
Kevin Constantine	December 9, 1999	Fired as head coach
Eddie Johnston	December 9, 1999	Hired as assistant coach
Herb Brooks	December 9, 1999	Hired as head coach
Rick Kehoe	December 9, 1999	Hired as assistant coach
Ivan Hlinka	February 7, 2000	Hired as assistant coach
Herb Brooks	May 9, 2000	Replaced as head coach

== Draft picks ==
Pittsburgh Penguins' picks at the 1999 NHL entry draft.

Round	#	Player	Pos	Nationality	College/Junior/Club team (League)
1	18	Konstantin Koltsov	Left wing	Belarus	Severstal Cherepovets (RSL)
2	51	Matt Murley	Left wing	United States	Rensselaer Polytechnic Institute (ECAC)
2	57^{[a]}	Jeremy Van Hoof	Defense	Canada	Ottawa 67's (OHL)
3	86	Sebastien Caron	Goaltender	Canada	Rimouski Oceanic (QMJHL)
4	115	Ryan Malone	Left wing	United States	Omaha Lancers (USHL)
5	144	Tomas Skvaridlo	Center	Slovakia	HKm Zvolen Jr. (Slovakia)
5	157^{[b]}	Vladimir Malenkykh	Defense	Russia	Lada Togliatti (RSL)
6	176	Doug Meyer	Defense	Russia	University of Minnesota (WCHA)
7	204	Tom Kostopoulos	Right wing	Canada	London Knights (OHL)
8	233	Darcy Robinson	Defense	Canada	Saskatoon Blades (WHL)
9	261	Andrew McPherson	Left wing	Canada	Rensselaer Polytechnic Institute (ECAC)

Draft notes

- ^{a} Compensatory pick received from NHL as compensation for free agent Ron Francis.
- ^{b} Compensatory pick received from NHL as compensation for free agent Fredrik Olausson.

== Farm teams ==
The Wilkes-Barre/Scranton Penguins, previously known as the Cornwall Aces, debuted in the AHL as the top minor league affiliate for the Pittsburgh Penguins. Playing in the Empire State Division, they finished last overall in the Western Conference with a record of 23-43-9-5. WBRE, the NBC station in Wilkes-Barre/Scranton, received a James H. Ellery Memorial Award for outstanding television coverage. Marketing executives Brian Magness and Rich Hixon won the Ken McKenzie Award as the league's outstanding marketing executives.

The Wheeling Nailers of the East Coast Hockey League finished the season in fifth place in the Northwest Division with a record of 25-40-5.

== See also ==
- 1999–2000 NHL season
