= 1999–2000 New York Islanders season =

NHL hockey team season

1999–2000 New York Islanders
- Division: 5th Atlantic
- Conference: 13th Eastern
- 1999–2000 record: 24–48–9–1
- Home record: 10–25–5–1
- Road record: 14–23–4–0
- Goals for: 194
- Goals against: 275

Team information
- General manager: Mike Milbury
- Coach: Butch Goring
- Captain: Kenny Jonsson
- Arena: Nassau Veterans Memorial Coliseum
- Average attendance: 9,748
- Minor league affiliates: Lowell Lock Monsters; Chicago Wolves; Trenton Titans

Team leaders
- Goals: Mariusz Czerkawski (35)
- Assists: Mariusz Czerkawski (35)
- Points: Mariusz Czerkawski (70)
- Penalty minutes: Eric Cairns (196)
- Plus/minus: Ian Herbers (+6)
- Wins: Kevin Weekes (10)
- Goals against average: Felix Potvin (3.21)

The 1999–2000 New York Islanders season was the 28th season in the franchise's history. In this season, the Islanders slipped to last place in the Atlantic Division, and 13th overall in the Eastern Conference, to miss the Stanley Cup playoffs for the sixth consecutive year.

== Off-season ==
Captain Trevor Linden was traded to the Montreal Canadiens; defenseman Kenny Jonsson was named his replacement as captain.

== Regular season ==
The Islanders had the most power-play opportunities against during the regular season, with 420, and allowed the most power-play goals, with 84.

On March 2, 2000, the Islanders scored three short-handed goals in a 5–5 tie with the Ottawa Senators.

=== Final standings ===
Atlantic Division
No.	CR		GP	W	L	T	OTL	GF	GA	Pts
1	1	**Philadelphia Flyers**	82	45	22	12	3	237	179	105
2	4	**New Jersey Devils**	82	45	24	8	5	251	203	103
3	7	**Pittsburgh Penguins**	82	37	31	8	6	241	236	88
4	11	New York Rangers	82	29	38	12	3	218	246	73
5	13	New York Islanders	82	24	48	9	1	194	275	58

Note: CR = Conference rank; GP = Games played; W = Wins; L = Losses; T = Ties; OTL=Overtime loss; GF = Goals for; GA = Goals against; PIM=Penalties in Minutes; Pts = Points
Bolded teams qualified for the playoffs.

Eastern Conference
R		Div	GP	W	L	T	OTL	GF	GA	Pts
**1**	**z – Philadelphia Flyers**	**AT**	**82**	**45**	**22**	**12**	**3**	**237**	**179**	105
**2**	**y – Washington Capitals**	**SE**	**82**	**44**	**24**	**12**	**2**	**227**	**194**	102
**3**	**y – Toronto Maple Leafs**	**NE**	**82**	**45**	**27**	**7**	**3**	**246**	**222**	100
**4**	**New Jersey Devils**	**AT**	**82**	**45**	**24**	**8**	**5**	**251**	**203**	103
**5**	**Florida Panthers**	**SE**	**82**	**43**	**27**	**6**	**6**	**244**	**209**	98
**6**	**Ottawa Senators**	**NE**	**82**	**41**	**28**	**11**	**2**	**244**	**210**	95
**7**	**Pittsburgh Penguins**	**AT**	**82**	**37**	**31**	**8**	**6**	**241**	**236**	88
**8**	**Buffalo Sabres**	**NE**	**82**	**35**	**32**	**11**	**4**	**213**	**204**	85
8.5
9	Carolina Hurricanes	SE	82	37	35	10	0	217	216	84
10	Montreal Canadiens	NE	82	35	34	9	4	196	194	83
11	New York Rangers	AT	82	29	38	12	3	218	246	73
12	Boston Bruins	NE	82	24	33	19	6	210	248	73
13	New York Islanders	AT	82	24	48	9	1	194	275	58
14	Tampa Bay Lightning	SE	82	19	47	9	7	204	310	54
15	Atlanta Thrashers	SE	82	14	57	7	4	170	313	39

Divisions: AT – Atlantic, NE – Northeast, SE – Southeast

bold – Qualified for playoffs; z – Won conference; y – Won division

== Schedule and results ==
1999–2000 regular season
October: 2–6–1–0 (home: 1–3–1–0; road: 1–3–0–0)

Game	Date	Score	Opponent	Record	Recap
1	October 2, 1999	2–4	@ Tampa Bay Lightning (1999–2000)	0–1–0–0	L
2	October 10, 1999	4–2	Colorado Avalanche (1999–2000)	1–1–0–0	W
3	October 11, 1999	2–4	New York Rangers (1999–2000)	1–2–0–0	L
4	October 14, 1999	0–2	Atlanta Thrashers (1999–2000)	1–3–0–0	L
5	October 16, 1999	1–4	@ New Jersey Devils (1999–2000)	1–4–0–0	L
6	October 18, 1999	4–2	@ Montreal Canadiens (1999–2000)	2–4–0–0	W
7	October 23, 1999	2–2 OT	Vancouver Canucks (1999–2000)	2–4–1–0	T
8	October 27, 1999	3–6	@ Florida Panthers (1999–2000)	2–5–1–0	L
9	October 30, 1999	0–4	Carolina Hurricanes (1999–2000)	2–6–1–0	L

November: 4–6–2–0 (home: 1–3–0–0; road: 3–3–2–0)

Game	Date	Score	Opponent	Record	Recap
10	November 3, 1999	3–3 OT	@ New York Rangers (1999–2000)	2–6–2–0	T
11	November 4, 1999	2–1 OT	Montreal Canadiens (1999–2000)	3–6–2–0	W
12	November 6, 1999	1–2	@ Buffalo Sabres (1999–2000)	3–7–2–0	L
13	November 10, 1999	2–0	@ Carolina Hurricanes (1999–2000)	4–7–2–0	W
14	November 12, 1999	0–5	@ Chicago Blackhawks (1999–2000)	4–8–2–0	L
15	November 13, 1999	3–5	St. Louis Blues (1999–2000)	4–9–2–0	L
16	November 19, 1999	3–2	@ Colorado Avalanche (1999–2000)	5–9–2–0	W
17	November 21, 1999	4–4 OT	@ Edmonton Oilers (1999–2000)	5–9–3–0	T
18	November 23, 1999	2–3	@ Calgary Flames (1999–2000)	5–10–3–0	L
19	November 27, 1999	3–4	Washington Capitals (1999–2000)	5–11–3–0	L
20	November 28, 1999	2–1	@ Boston Bruins (1999–2000)	6–11–3–0	W
21	November 30, 1999	1–2	Dallas Stars (1999–2000)	6–12–3–0	L

December: 3–9–2–0 (home: 3–6–1–0; road: 0–3–1–0)

Game	Date	Score	Opponent	Record	Recap
22	December 2, 1999	0–5	Calgary Flames (1999–2000)	6–13–3–0	L
23	December 4, 1999	3–4	Atlanta Thrashers (1999–2000)	6–14–3–0	L
24	December 7, 1999	2–4	@ Washington Capitals (1999–2000)	6–15–3–0	L
25	December 9, 1999	2–4	Montreal Canadiens (1999–2000)	6–16–3–0	L
26	December 11, 1999	1–1 OT	@ Ottawa Senators (1999–2000)	6–16–4–0	T
27	December 14, 1999	2–4	Edmonton Oilers (1999–2000)	6–17–4–0	L
28	December 15, 1999	1–5	@ Toronto Maple Leafs (1999–2000)	6–18–4–0	L
29	December 18, 1999	2–2 OT	Buffalo Sabres (1999–2000)	6–18–5–0	T
30	December 19, 1999	5–3	New Jersey Devils (1999–2000)	7–18–5–0	W
31	December 21, 1999	0–4	Pittsburgh Penguins (1999–2000)	7–19–5–0	L
32	December 23, 1999	4–2	New York Rangers (1999–2000)	8–19–5–0	W
33	December 27, 1999	3–0	Boston Bruins (1999–2000)	9–19–5–0	W
34	December 29, 1999	1–2	Toronto Maple Leafs (1999–2000)	9–20–5–0	L
35	December 30, 1999	3–9	@ Pittsburgh Penguins (1999–2000)	9–21–5–0	L

January: 4–9–1–1 (home: 1–3–1–1; road: 3–6–0–0)

Game	Date	Score	Opponent	Record	Recap
36	January 2, 2000	1–4	Philadelphia Flyers (1999–2000)	9–22–5–0	L
37	January 4, 2000	3–7	Boston Bruins (1999–2000)	9–23–5–0	L
38	January 6, 2000	2–3	@ Philadelphia Flyers (1999–2000)	9–24–5–0	L
39	January 8, 2000	5–2	@ Boston Bruins (1999–2000)	10–24–5–0	W
40	January 10, 2000	2–2 OT	Phoenix Coyotes (1999–2000)	10–24–6–0	T
41	January 12, 2000	3–4	@ Florida Panthers (1999–2000)	10–25–6–0	L
42	January 13, 2000	2–4	@ Tampa Bay Lightning (1999–2000)	10–26–6–0	L
43	January 15, 2000	2–5	New York Rangers (1999–2000)	10–27–6–0	L
44	January 17, 2000	3–4 OT	Ottawa Senators (1999–2000)	10–27–6–1	OTL
45	January 19, 2000	0–3	@ Montreal Canadiens (1999–2000)	10–28–6–1	L
46	January 21, 2000	0–4	@ New Jersey Devils (1999–2000)	10–29–6–1	L
47	January 22, 2000	2–0	Tampa Bay Lightning (1999–2000)	11–29–6–1	W
48	January 26, 2000	4–2	@ Mighty Ducks of Anaheim (1999–2000)	12–29–6–1	W
49	January 29, 2000	3–2 OT	@ San Jose Sharks (1999–2000)	13–29–6–1	W
50	January 31, 2000	2–5	@ Los Angeles Kings (1999–2000)	13–30–6–1	L

February: 4–8–1–0 (home: 2–6–0–0; road: 2–2–1–0)

Game	Date	Score	Opponent	Record	Recap
51	February 2, 2000	4–6	Nashville Predators (1999–2000)	13–31–6–1	L
52	February 3, 2000	2–4	@ Pittsburgh Penguins (1999–2000)	13–32–6–1	L
53	February 8, 2000	3–4	Carolina Hurricanes (1999–2000)	13–33–6–1	L
54	February 10, 2000	5–4 OT	Tampa Bay Lightning (1999–2000)	14–33–6–1	W
55	February 12, 2000	5–1	Pittsburgh Penguins (1999–2000)	15–33–6–1	W
56	February 13, 2000	4–2	@ New York Rangers (1999–2000)	16–33–6–1	W
57	February 15, 2000	1–4	San Jose Sharks (1999–2000)	16–34–6–1	L
58	February 17, 2000	2–2 OT	@ Philadelphia Flyers (1999–2000)	16–34–7–1	T
59	February 19, 2000	4–2	@ New Jersey Devils (1999–2000)	17–34–7–1	W
60	February 21, 2000	0–2	Detroit Red Wings (1999–2000)	17–35–7–1	L
61	February 25, 2000	2–5	@ Detroit Red Wings (1999–2000)	17–36–7–1	L
62	February 26, 2000	1–5	Philadelphia Flyers (1999–2000)	17–37–7–1	L
63	February 28, 2000	2–3	Washington Capitals (1999–2000)	17–38–7–1	L

March: 5–8–1–0 (home: 1–3–1–0; road: 4–5–0–0)

Game	Date	Score	Opponent	Record	Recap
64	March 2, 2000	5–5 OT	Ottawa Senators (1999–2000)	17–38–8–1	T
65	March 4, 2000	4–2	Buffalo Sabres (1999–2000)	18–38–8–1	W
66	March 5, 2000	4–3 OT	@ Philadelphia Flyers (1999–2000)	19–38–8–1	W
67	March 9, 2000	0–5	@ Phoenix Coyotes (1999–2000)	19–39–8–1	L
68	March 10, 2000	4–3 OT	@ Dallas Stars (1999–2000)	20–39–8–1	W
69	March 12, 2000	2–4	@ Buffalo Sabres (1999–2000)	20–40–8–1	L
70	March 15, 2000	3–4	@ Washington Capitals (1999–2000)	20–41–8–1	L
71	March 16, 2000	4–2	@ Atlanta Thrashers (1999–2000)	21–41–8–1	W
72	March 18, 2000	2–4	Florida Panthers (1999–2000)	21–42–8–1	L
73	March 21, 2000	2–8	Pittsburgh Penguins (1999–2000)	21–43–8–1	L
74	March 22, 2000	5–2	@ Toronto Maple Leafs (1999–2000)	22–43–8–1	W
75	March 24, 2000	2–8	New Jersey Devils (1999–2000)	22–44–8–1	L
76	March 26, 2000	1–4	@ Carolina Hurricanes (1999–2000)	22–45–8–1	L
77	March 28, 2000	2–3	@ Nashville Predators (1999–2000)	22–46–8–1	L

April: 2–2–1–0 (home: 1–1–1–0; road: 1–1–0–0)

Game	Date	Score	Opponent	Record	Recap
78	April 1, 2000	2–2 OT	Chicago Blackhawks (1999–2000)	22–46–9–1	T
79	April 2, 2000	4–5	@ Atlanta Thrashers (1999–2000)	22–47–9–1	L
80	April 6, 2000	2–1	@ Ottawa Senators (1999–2000)	23–47–9–1	W
81	April 7, 2000	1–2	Toronto Maple Leafs (1999–2000)	23–48–9–1	L
82	April 9, 2000	3–2	Florida Panthers (1999–2000)	24–48–9–1	W

Legend: W Win (2 points) L Loss (0 points) T Tie (1 point) OTL Overtime loss (1 point)

== Player statistics ==
=== Scoring ===
- Position abbreviations: C = Center; D = Defense; G = Goaltender; LW = Left wing; RW = Right wing
- † = Joined team via a transaction (e.g., trade, waivers, signing) during the season. Stats reflect time with the Islanders only.
- ‡ = Left team via a transaction (e.g., trade, waivers, release) during the season. Stats reflect time with the Islanders only.

No.	Player	Pos	Regular season					
No.	Player	Pos	GP	G	A	Pts	+/-	PIM
21	Mariusz Czerkawski	RW	79	35	35	70	−16	34
15	Brad Isbister	LW	64	22	20	42	−18	100
18	Tim Connolly	C	81	14	20	34	−25	44
13	Claude Lapointe	C	76	15	16	31	−22	60
32	Jorgen Jonsson‡	LW	68	11	17	28	−6	16
25	Josh Green	LW	49	12	14	26	−7	41
38	Dave Scatchard†	C	44	12	14	26	0	93
29	Kenny Jonsson	D	65	1	24	25	−15	32
62	Olli Jokinen	C	82	11	10	21	0	80
6	Jamie Heward	D	54	6	11	17	−9	26
20	Jamie Rivers	D	75	1	16	17	−4	84
10	Mats Lindgren	C	43	9	7	16	0	24
24	Gino Odjick‡	RW	46	5	10	15	−7	90
12	Mike Watt	LW	45	5	6	11	−8	17
37	Dmitri Nabokov	LW	26	4	7	11	−8	16
3	Zdeno Chara	D	65	2	9	11	−27	57
36 (Note: Andersson wore number 11 in his first game.)	Niklas Andersson‡†	LW	17	3	7	10	−3	8
33	Eric Cairns	D	67	2	7	9	−5	196
41	Raymond Giroux	D	14	0	9	9	0	10
34	Mathieu Biron	D	60	4	4	8	−13	38
11	Bill Muckalt†	RW	12	4	3	7	5	4
24	Johan Davidsson†	C	14	2	4	6	0	0
28 (Note: Krog wore number 11 in his first four games.)	Jason Krog	C	17	2	4	6	−1	6
44	Mark Lawrence	RW	29	1	5	6	−13	26
14	Chris Ferraro	C	11	1	3	4	1	8
8	Steve Webb	RW	65	1	3	4	−4	103
58	Aris Brimanis	D	18	2	1	3	−5	6
17	Ted Drury†	C	55	2	1	3	−8	31
16	Vladimir Orszagh	RW	11	2	1	3	1	4
36	Evgeny Korolev	D	17	1	2	3	−10	8
43	Mikael Andersson†	LW	19	0	3	3	−1	4
56	Ian Herbers†	D	6	0	3	3	6	2
55	Vladimir Chebaturkin	D	17	1	1	2	−3	8
39	Sean Haggerty	LW	5	1	1	2	3	4
4	Eric Brewer	D	26	0	2	2	−11	20
17	Tony Hrkac‡	C	7	0	2	2	−1	0
2	Rich Pilon‡	D	9	0	2	2	−2	34
7	Dallas Eakins‡	D	2	0	1	1	3	2
39	Scott Pearson	LW	2	0	1	1	1	0
7	Ray Schultz	D	9	0	1	1	1	30
80	Kevin Weekes†	G	36	0	1	1		0
30	Wade Flaherty	G	4	0	0	0		0
16	Daniel Lacroix	LW	1	0	0	0	−1	0
1	Roberto Luongo	G	24	0	0	0		0
32	Petr Mika	LW	3	0	0	0	−1	0
28	Felix Potvin‡	G	22	0	0	0		2
35	Steve Valiquette	G	6	0	0	0		0

=== Goaltending ===
- † = Joined team via a transaction (e.g., trade, waivers, signing) during the season. Stats reflect time with the Islanders only.
- ‡ = Left team via a transaction (e.g., trade, waivers, release) during the season. Stats reflect time with the Islanders only.

No.	Player	Regular season									
No.	Player	GP	W	L	T	SA	GA	GAA	SV%	SO	TOI
80	Kevin Weekes†	36	10	20	4	1173	115	3.41	.902	1	2026
1	Roberto Luongo	24	7	14	1	730	70	3.25	.904	1	1292
28	Felix Potvin‡	22	5	14	3	632	68	3.21	.892	1	1273
35	Steve Valiquette	6	2	0	0	117	6	1.87	.949	0	193
30	Wade Flaherty	4	0	1	1	81	7	2.31	.914	0	182

== Awards and records ==
=== Awards ===
Type	Award/honor	Recipient	Ref
League (in-season)	NHL All-Star Game selection	Mariusz Czerkawski	
League (in-season)	NHL Player of the Week	Jorgen Jonsson (February 14)	
Team	Bob Nystrom Award	Claude Lapointe	

=== Milestones ===
Milestone	Player	Date	Ref
First game	Tim Connolly	October 2, 1999	
First game	Jorgen Jonsson	October 2, 1999	
First game	Mathieu Biron	October 14, 1999	
First game	Evgeny Korolev	October 27, 1999	
First game	Roberto Luongo	November 28, 1999	
First game	Jason Krog	December 4, 1999	
First game	Raymond Giroux	December 11, 1999	
First game	Steve Valiquette	March 9, 2000	
First game	Petr Mika	March 21, 2000	

== Draft picks ==
New York's draft picks at the 1999 NHL entry draft held at the FleetCenter in Boston.

Round	#	Player	Nationality	College/Junior/Club team (League)
1	5	Tim Connolly	United States	Erie Otters (OHL)
1	8	Taylor Pyatt	Canada	Sudbury Wolves (OHL)
1	10	Branislav Mezei	Slovakia	Belleville Bulls (OHL)
1	28	Kristian Kudroc	Slovakia	Michalovce (Slovakia)
3	78	Mattias Weinhandl	Sweden	IF Troja/Ljungby (Sweden)
3	87	Brian Collins	United States	St. John's High School (USHS-MA)
4	101	Juraj Kolník	Slovakia	Rimouski Océanic (QMJHL)
4	102	Johan Halvardsson	Sweden	HV71 (Sweden)
5	130	Justin Mapletoft	Canada	Red Deer Rebels (WHL)
5	140	Adam Johnson	United States	Greenway High School (USHS-MN)
6	163	Bjorn Melin	Sweden	HV71 (Sweden)
8	228	Radek Martinek	Czech Republic	HC České Budějovice (Czech Republic)
9	255	Brett Henning	United States	University of Notre Dame (NCAA)
9	268	Tyler Scott	United States	Upper Canada College (HS-Ontario)

== See also ==
- 1999–2000 NHL season
