= 1999–2000 Florida Panthers season =

National Hockey League team season

1999–2000 Florida Panthers
- Division: 2nd Southeast
- Conference: 5th Eastern
- 1999–2000 record: 43–27–6–6
- Home record: 26–9–4–2
- Road record: 17–18–2–4
- Goals for: 244
- Goals against: 209

Team information
- General manager: Bryan Murray
- Coach: Terry Murray
- Captain: Scott Mellanby
- Arena: National Car Rental Center
- Average attendance: 15,981
- Minor league affiliates: Louisville Panthers; Port Huron Border Cats

Team leaders
- Goals: Pavel Bure (58)
- Assists: Viktor Kozlov (53)
- Points: Pavel Bure (94)
- Penalty minutes: Todd Simpson (202)
- Plus/minus: Pavel Bure (+25)
- Wins: Mike Vernon (18)
- Goals against average: Mikhail Shtalenkov (2.31)

The 1999–2000 Florida Panthers season was their seventh season in the National Hockey League (NHL).

== Regular season ==
=== Final standings ===
Southeast Division
No.	CR		GP	W	L	T	OTL	GF	GA	Pts
1	2	**Washington Capitals**	82	44	24	12	2	227	194	102
2	5	**Florida Panthers**	82	43	27	6	6	244	209	98
3	9	Carolina Hurricanes	82	37	35	10	0	217	216	84
4	14	Tampa Bay Lightning	82	19	47	9	7	204	310	54
5	15	Atlanta Thrashers	82	14	57	7	4	170	313	39

Note: CR = Conference rank; GP = Games played; W = Wins; L = Losses; T = Ties; OTL=Overtime loss; GF = Goals for; GA = Goals against; PIM=Penalties in Minutes; Pts = Points
Bolded teams qualified for the playoffs.

Eastern Conference
R		Div	GP	W	L	T	OTL	GF	GA	Pts
**1**	**z – Philadelphia Flyers**	**AT**	**82**	**45**	**22**	**12**	**3**	**237**	**179**	105
**2**	**y – Washington Capitals**	**SE**	**82**	**44**	**24**	**12**	**2**	**227**	**194**	102
**3**	**y – Toronto Maple Leafs**	**NE**	**82**	**45**	**27**	**7**	**3**	**246**	**222**	100
**4**	**New Jersey Devils**	**AT**	**82**	**45**	**24**	**8**	**5**	**251**	**203**	103
**5**	**Florida Panthers**	**SE**	**82**	**43**	**27**	**6**	**6**	**244**	**209**	98
**6**	**Ottawa Senators**	**NE**	**82**	**41**	**28**	**11**	**2**	**244**	**210**	95
**7**	**Pittsburgh Penguins**	**AT**	**82**	**37**	**31**	**8**	**6**	**241**	**236**	88
**8**	**Buffalo Sabres**	**NE**	**82**	**35**	**32**	**11**	**4**	**213**	**204**	85
8.5
9	Carolina Hurricanes	SE	82	37	35	10	0	217	216	84
10	Montreal Canadiens	NE	82	35	34	9	4	196	194	83
11	New York Rangers	AT	82	29	38	12	3	218	246	73
12	Boston Bruins	NE	82	24	33	19	6	210	248	73
13	New York Islanders	AT	82	24	48	9	1	194	275	58
14	Tampa Bay Lightning	SE	82	19	47	9	7	204	310	54
15	Atlanta Thrashers	SE	82	14	57	7	4	170	313	39

Divisions: AT – Atlantic, NE – Northeast, SE – Southeast

bold – Qualified for playoffs; z – Won conference; y – Won division

== Playoffs ==
The Panthers made the Stanley Cup playoffs for the first time since 1997. As the fifth seed in the Eastern Conference, they played the fourth-seeded New Jersey Devils. However, the Panthers were eliminated in a four-game sweep at the hands of the eventual champions. The Devils' sweep over the Panthers began a 12-year drought where the Florida team never made the playoffs. The Panthers would reenter the playoffs in 2012 after winning the Southeast Division title.

== Schedule and results ==
=== Regular season ===
1999–2000 regular season
October: 6–3–1–2 (home: 5–0–1–1; road: 1–3–0–1)

Game	Date	Score	Opponent	Record	Recap
1	October 2, 1999	4–3	Washington Capitals (1999–2000)	1–0–0–0	W
2	October 6, 1999	4–2	Los Angeles Kings (1999–2000)	2–0–0–0	W
3	October 9, 1999	2–2 OT	Detroit Red Wings (1999–2000)	2–0–1–0	T
4	October 12, 1999	2–1	@ Montreal Canadiens (1999–2000)	3–0–1–0	W
5	October 13, 1999	2–3	@ Toronto Maple Leafs (1999–2000)	3–1–1–0	L
6	October 16, 1999	3–2 OT	Mighty Ducks of Anaheim (1999–2000)	4–1–1–0	W
7	October 20, 1999	5–2	Vancouver Canucks (1999–2000)	5–1–1–0	W
8	October 22, 1999	2–3 OT	Calgary Flames (1999–2000)	5–1–1–1	OTL
9	October 24, 1999	0–2	@ Philadelphia Flyers (1999–2000)	5–2–1–1	L
10	October 27, 1999	6–3	New York Islanders (1999–2000)	6–2–1–1	W
11	October 29, 1999	2–3 OT	@ Buffalo Sabres (1999–2000)	6–2–1–2	OTL
12	October 30, 1999	0–5	@ Ottawa Senators (1999–2000)	6–3–1–2	L

November: 7–3–1–0 (home: 5–1–0–0; road: 2–2–1–0)

Game	Date	Score	Opponent	Record	Recap
13	November 3, 1999	2–2 OT	@ Edmonton Oilers (1999–2000)	6–3–2–2	T
14	November 5, 1999	2–3	@ Vancouver Canucks (1999–2000)	6–4–2–2	L
15	November 6, 1999	6–3	@ Calgary Flames (1999–2000)	7–4–2–2	W
16	November 10, 1999	4–1	Atlanta Thrashers (1999–2000)	8–4–2–2	W
17	November 13, 1999	3–1	Buffalo Sabres (1999–2000)	9–4–2–2	W
18	November 17, 1999	2–1	@ Colorado Avalanche (1999–2000)	10–4–2–2	W
19	November 18, 1999	0–3	@ St. Louis Blues (1999–2000)	10–5–2–2	L
20	November 20, 1999	2–1 OT	Pittsburgh Penguins (1999–2000)	11–5–2–2	W
21	November 24, 1999	1–6	Philadelphia Flyers (1999–2000)	11–6–2–2	L
22	November 26, 1999	6–2	New York Rangers (1999–2000)	12–6–2–2	W
23	November 27, 1999	3–0	Atlanta Thrashers (1999–2000)	13–6–2–2	W

December: 7–4–1–1 (home: 2–1–1–0; road: 5–3–0–1)

Game	Date	Score	Opponent	Record	Recap
24	December 3, 1999	1–2	@ Atlanta Thrashers (1999–2000)	13–7–2–2	L
25	December 4, 1999	2–1	Washington Capitals (1999–2000)	14–7–2–2	W
26	December 8, 1999	6–1	@ Phoenix Coyotes (1999–2000)	15–7–2–2	W
27	December 10, 1999	3–4	@ Dallas Stars (1999–2000)	15–8–2–2	L
28	December 11, 1999	4–2	@ Nashville Predators (1999–2000)	16–8–2–2	W
29	December 15, 1999	3–2	Nashville Predators (1999–2000)	17–8–2–2	W
30	December 17, 1999	4–2	@ Buffalo Sabres (1999–2000)	18–8–2–2	W
31	December 18, 1999	5–2	@ Pittsburgh Penguins (1999–2000)	19–8–2–2	W
32	December 20, 1999	4–6	Toronto Maple Leafs (1999–2000)	19–9–2–2	L
33	December 22, 1999	3–3 OT	Atlanta Thrashers (1999–2000)	19–9–3–2	T
34	December 26, 1999	3–4 OT	@ Carolina Hurricanes (1999–2000)	19–9–3–3	OTL
35	December 27, 1999	6–1	@ Tampa Bay Lightning (1999–2000)	20–9–3–3	W
36	December 30, 1999	1–2	@ Chicago Blackhawks (1999–2000)	20–10–3–3	L

January: 9–4–1–0 (home: 6–2–0–0; road: 3–2–1–0)

Game	Date	Score	Opponent	Record	Recap
37	January 1, 2000	7–5	Tampa Bay Lightning (1999–2000)	21–10–3–3	W
38	January 5, 2000	5–1	@ Mighty Ducks of Anaheim (1999–2000)	22–10–3–3	W
39	January 6, 2000	2–4	@ Los Angeles Kings (1999–2000)	22–11–3–3	L
40	January 8, 2000	4–2	@ San Jose Sharks (1999–2000)	23–11–3–3	W
41	January 12, 2000	4–3	New York Islanders (1999–2000)	24–11–3–3	W
42	January 14, 2000	5–1	Carolina Hurricanes (1999–2000)	25–11–3–3	W
43	January 15, 2000	5–2	@ Tampa Bay Lightning (1999–2000)	26–11–3–3	W
44	January 17, 2000	3–1	Philadelphia Flyers (1999–2000)	27–11–3–3	W
45	January 19, 2000	1–3	Washington Capitals (1999–2000)	27–12–3–3	L
46	January 21, 2000	3–3 OT	@ Atlanta Thrashers (1999–2000)	27–12–4–3	T
47	January 22, 2000	4–3 OT	Boston Bruins (1999–2000)	28–12–4–3	W
48	January 26, 2000	2–3	New Jersey Devils (1999–2000)	28–13–4–3	L
49	January 27, 2000	2–4	@ Philadelphia Flyers (1999–2000)	28–14–4–3	L
50	January 29, 2000	2–1	Edmonton Oilers (1999–2000)	29–14–4–3	W

February: 5–6–0–2 (home: 3–3–0–1; road: 2–3–0–1)

Game	Date	Score	Opponent	Record	Recap
51	February 1, 2000	2–4	@ Carolina Hurricanes (1999–2000)	29–15–4–3	L
52	February 2, 2000	3–1	Montreal Canadiens (1999–2000)	30–15–4–3	W
53	February 9, 2000	4–1	San Jose Sharks (1999–2000)	31–15–4–3	W
54	February 11, 2000	3–5	@ Ottawa Senators (1999–2000)	31–16–4–3	L
55	February 12, 2000	5–1	@ Boston Bruins (1999–2000)	32–16–4–3	W
56	February 14, 2000	1–4	@ Montreal Canadiens (1999–2000)	32–17–4–3	L
57	February 16, 2000	3–0	New York Rangers (1999–2000)	33–17–4–3	W
58	February 19, 2000	1–2	Pittsburgh Penguins (1999–2000)	33–18–4–3	L
59	February 21, 2000	2–4	Ottawa Senators (1999–2000)	33–19–4–3	L
60	February 23, 2000	2–3 OT	@ Washington Capitals (1999–2000)	33–19–4–4	OTL
61	February 24, 2000	4–2	@ Carolina Hurricanes (1999–2000)	34–19–4–4	W
62	February 26, 2000	1–2 OT	Carolina Hurricanes (1999–2000)	34–19–4–5	OTL
63	February 28, 2000	2–5	Buffalo Sabres (1999–2000)	34–20–4–5	L

March: 7–6–1–0 (home: 3–2–1–0; road: 4–4–0–0)

Game	Date	Score	Opponent	Record	Recap
64	March 1, 2000	3–1	Toronto Maple Leafs (1999–2000)	35–20–4–5	W
65	March 3, 2000	2–4	@ New York Rangers (1999–2000)	35–21–4–5	L
66	March 4, 2000	1–1 OT	St. Louis Blues (1999–2000)	35–21–5–5	T
67	March 7, 2000	2–4	@ Washington Capitals (1999–2000)	35–22–5–5	L
68	March 10, 2000	4–3	@ Tampa Bay Lightning (1999–2000)	36–22–5–5	W
69	March 11, 2000	2–5	Chicago Blackhawks (1999–2000)	36–23–5–5	L
70	March 16, 2000	2–4	@ Pittsburgh Penguins (1999–2000)	36–24–5–5	L
71	March 18, 2000	4–2	@ New York Islanders (1999–2000)	37–24–5–5	W
72	March 19, 2000	2–5	@ New Jersey Devils (1999–2000)	37–25–5–5	L
73	March 21, 2000	4–3	@ New York Rangers (1999–2000)	38–25–5–5	W
74	March 23, 2000	3–1	@ Boston Bruins (1999–2000)	39–25–5–5	W
75	March 25, 2000	4–2	Montreal Canadiens (1999–2000)	40–25–5–5	W
76	March 29, 2000	1–4	Dallas Stars (1999–2000)	40–26–5–5	L
77	March 31, 2000	3–1	Ottawa Senators (1999–2000)	41–26–5–5	W

April: 2–1–1–1 (home: 2–0–1–0; road: 0–1–0–1)

Game	Date	Score	Opponent	Record	Recap
78	April 1, 2000	3–3 OT	Tampa Bay Lightning (1999–2000)	41–26–6–5	T
79	April 3, 2000	5–2	New Jersey Devils (1999–2000)	42–26–6–5	W
80	April 5, 2000	6–3	Boston Bruins (1999–2000)	43–26–6–5	W
81	April 8, 2000	1–2 OT	@ New Jersey Devils (1999–2000)	43–26–6–6	OTL
82	April 9, 2000	2–3	@ New York Islanders (1999–2000)	43–27–6–6	L

Legend: W Win (2 points) L Loss (0 points) T Tie (1 point) OTL Overtime loss (1 point)

=== Playoffs ===
2000 Stanley Cup playoffs
Eastern Conference Quarterfinals vs. (4) New Jersey Devils – Devils win 4–0

Game	Date	Score	Opponent	Series	Recap
1	April 13, 2000	3–4	@ New Jersey Devils	Devils lead 1–0	L
2	April 16, 2000	1–2	@ New Jersey Devils	Devils lead 2–0	L
3	April 18, 2000	1–2	New Jersey Devils	Devils lead 3–0	L
4	April 20, 2000	1–4	New Jersey Devils	Devils win 4–0	L

Legend: W Win L Loss

== Player statistics ==
=== Scoring ===
- Position abbreviations: C = Center; D = Defense; G = Goaltender; LW = Left wing; RW = Right wing
- † = Joined team via a transaction (e.g., trade, waivers, signing) during the season. Stats reflect time with the Panthers only.
- ‡ = Left team via a transaction (e.g., trade, waivers, release) during the season. Stats reflect time with the Panthers only.

No.	Player	Pos	Regular season						Playoffs					
No.	Player	Pos	GP	G	A	Pts	+/-	PIM	GP	G	A	Pts	+/-	PIM
10	Pavel Bure	RW	74	58	36	94	25	16	4	1	3	4	−3	2
14	Ray Whitney	LW	81	29	42	71	16	35	4	1	0	1	−2	4
25	Viktor Kozlov	C	80	17	53	70	24	16	4	0	1	1	−3	0
24	Robert Svehla	D	82	9	40	49	23	64	4	0	1	1	0	4
27	Scott Mellanby	RW	77	18	28	46	14	126	4	0	1	1	0	2
21	Mark Parrish	RW	81	26	18	44	1	39	4	0	1	1	−2	0
28	Jaroslav Spacek	D	82	10	26	36	7	53	4	0	0	0	−1	0
44	Rob Niedermayer	C	81	10	23	33	−5	46	4	1	0	1	−1	6
4	Bret Hedican	D	76	6	19	25	4	68	4	0	0	0	1	0
13 (Note: Kvasha wore number 16 in his first seven games.)	Oleg Kvasha	RW	78	5	20	25	3	34	4	0	0	0	0	0
26 (Note: Sheppard wore number 16 in his first eight games.)	Ray Sheppard†	RW	47	10	10	20	−4	4	—	—	—	—	—	—
7	Mike Wilson	D	60	4	16	20	10	35	4	0	0	0	−5	0
19	Radek Dvorak‡	RW	35	7	10	17	5	6	—	—	—	—	—	—
18	Cam Stewart	LW	65	9	7	16	−2	30	—	—	—	—	—	—
12 (Note: Johnson wore number 29 through January 1.)	Ryan Johnson‡	C	66	4	12	16	1	14	—	—	—	—	—	—
3	Paul Laus	D	77	3	8	11	−1	172	4	0	0	0	0	8
9	Len Barrie†	C	14	4	6	10	4	6	4	0	0	0	−1	0
8	Peter Worrell	LW	48	3	6	9	−7	169	4	1	0	1	−2	8
16	Mike Sillinger†	C	13	4	4	8	−1	16	4	2	1	3	−1	2
2	Lance Pitlick	D	62	3	5	8	7	44	4	0	1	1	0	0
22	Todd Simpson	D	82	1	6	7	5	202	4	0	0	0	−4	4
5	Filip Kuba‡	D	13	1	5	6	−3	2	—	—	—	—	—	—
16 (Note: Novoseltsev wore number 26 in his first eleven games.)	Ivan Novoseltsev	RW	14	2	1	3	−3	8	—	—	—	—	—	—
12	Alex Hicks	LW	8	1	2	3	3	4	4	0	1	1	−1	4
6	Dan Boyle	D	13	0	3	3	−2	4	—	—	—	—	—	—
29 (Note: Vernon wore number 32 in his first game.)	Mike Vernon†	G	34	0	3	3		2	4	0	0	0		10
45	Brad Ference	D	13	0	2	2	2	46	—	—	—	—	—	—
48	Marcus Nilson	LW	9	0	2	2	2	2	—	—	—	—	—	—
40	Eric Boguniecki	C	4	0	0	0	−1	2	—	—	—	—	—	—
31	Sean Burke‡	G	7	0	0	0		2	—	—	—	—	—	—
48	Dave Duerden	LW	2	0	0	0	0	0	—	—	—	—	—	—
47	Craig Ferguson	C	3	0	0	0	−2	0	—	—	—	—	—	—
48	Dwayne Hay‡	LW	6	0	0	0	−2	2	—	—	—	—	—	—
15	John Jakopin	D	17	0	0	0	−2	26	—	—	—	—	—	—
37	Trevor Kidd	G	28	0	0	0		0	—	—	—	—	—	—
30	Mikhail Shtalenkov†	G	15	0	0	0		2	—	—	—	—	—	—
32	Richard Shulmistra	G	1	0	0	0		0	—	—	—	—	—	—
23	Chris Wells‡	C	13	0	0	0	−5	14	—	—	—	—	—	—

=== Goaltending ===
- † = Joined team via a transaction (e.g., trade, waivers, signing) during the season. Stats reflect time with the Panthers only.
- ‡ = Left team via a transaction (e.g., trade, waivers, release) during the season. Stats reflect time with the Panthers only.

No.	Player	Regular season										Playoffs								
No.	Player	GP	W	L	T	SA	GA	GAA	SV%	SO	TOI	GP	W	L	SA	GA	GAA	SV%	SO	TOI
29	Mike Vernon†	34	18	13	2	1020	83	2.47	.919	1	2019	4	0	4	136	12	3.04	.912	0	237
37	Trevor Kidd	28	14	11	2	809	69	2.63	.915	1	1574	—	—	—	—	—	—	—	—	—
30	Mikhail Shtalenkov†	15	8	4	2	369	34	2.31	.908	0	882	—	—	—	—	—	—	—	—	—
31	Sean Burke‡	7	2	5	0	208	18	2.58	.913	0	418	—	—	—	—	—	—	—	—	—
32	Richard Shulmistra	1	1	0	0	21	1	1.00	.952	0	60	—	—	—	—	—	—	—	—	—

== Awards and records ==
=== Awards ===
Type	Award/honor	Recipient	Ref
League (annual)	Maurice "Rocket" Richard Trophy	Pavel Bure	
League (annual)	NHL Second All-Star Team	Pavel Bure (Right wing)	
League (in-season)	NHL All-Star Game selection	Pavel Bure	
League (in-season)	NHL All-Star Game selection	Viktor Kozlov	
League (in-season)	NHL All-Star Game selection	Ray Whitney (Note: Whitney was an injury replacement for Pierre Turgeon of the St. Louis Blues.)	
League (in-season)	NHL Player of the Month	Pavel Bure (December)	
League (in-season)	NHL Player of the Week	Pavel Bure (December 20)	

=== Milestones ===
Milestone	Player	Date	Ref
First game	Ivan Novoseltsev	October 13, 1999	
First game	Dave Duerden	January 6, 2000	
First game	Eric Boguniecki	March 3, 2000	
First game	Brad Ference	March 10, 2000	
1,000th game played	Scott Mellanby	March 1, 2000	

== Draft picks ==
Florida's draft picks at the 1999 NHL entry draft held at the FleetCenter in Boston, Massachusetts.

Round	#	Player	Nationality	College/Junior/Club team (League)
1	12	Denis Shvidki	Ukraine	Barrie Colts (OHL)
2	40	Alex Auld	Canada	North Bay Centennials (OHL)
3	70	Niklas Hagman	Finland	HIFK (Finland)
3	80	Jean-Francois Laniel	Canada	Shawinigan Cataractes (QMJHL)
4	103	Morgan McCormick	Canada	Kingston Frontenacs (OHL)
4	109	Rod Sarich	Canada	Calgary Hitmen (WHL)
6	169	Brad Woods	Canada	Brampton Battalion (OHL)
7	198	Travis Eagles	Canada	Prince George Cougars (WHL)
8	227	Jonathan Charron	Canada	Val-d'or Foreurs (QMJHL)

== Farm teams ==
Louisville Panthers

== See also ==
- 1999–2000 NHL season
