= 1999–2000 Tampa Bay Lightning season =

NHL season

1999–2000 Tampa Bay Lightning
- Division: 4th Southeast
- Conference: 14th Eastern
- 1999–2000 record: 19–47–9–7
- Home record: 13–20–4–4
- Road record: 6–27–5–3
- Goals for: 204
- Goals against: 310

Team information
- General manager: Rick Dudley
- Coach: Steve Ludzik
- Captain: Bill Houlder (Oct.); Chris Gratton (Oct.–Mar.); Vincent Lecavalier (Mar.–Apr.)
- Arena: Ice Palace
- Average attendance: 13,600
- Minor league affiliates: Detroit Vipers; Toledo Storm

Team leaders
- Goals: Vincent Lecavalier (25)
- Assists: Vincent Lecavalier (42)
- Points: Vincent Lecavalier (67)
- Penalty minutes: Petr Svoboda (170)
- Plus/minus: Steve Guolla (+2); Robert Petrovicky (+2)
- Wins: Dan Cloutier (9)
- Goals against average: Dan Cloutier (3.49)

The 1999–2000 Tampa Bay Lightning season was the Lightning's eighth season of operation. The club placed fourteenth overall in the Eastern Conference and failed to make the playoffs for the fourth consecutive year for the first time in franchise history.

== Regular season ==
- March 4, 2000: In a victory over the Tampa Bay Lightning, Patrick Roy earned the 435th victory of his career.

=== Final standings ===
Southeast Division
No.	CR		GP	W	L	T	OTL	GF	GA	Pts
1	2	**Washington Capitals**	82	44	24	12	2	227	194	102
2	5	**Florida Panthers**	82	43	27	6	6	244	209	98
3	9	Carolina Hurricanes	82	37	35	10	0	217	216	84
4	14	Tampa Bay Lightning	82	19	47	9	7	204	310	54
5	15	Atlanta Thrashers	82	14	57	7	4	170	313	39

Note: CR = Conference rank; GP = Games played; W = Wins; L = Losses; T = Ties; OTL=Overtime loss; GF = Goals for; GA = Goals against; PIM=Penalties in Minutes; Pts = Points
Bolded teams qualified for the playoffs.

Eastern Conference
R		Div	GP	W	L	T	OTL	GF	GA	Pts
**1**	**z – Philadelphia Flyers**	**AT**	**82**	**45**	**22**	**12**	**3**	**237**	**179**	105
**2**	**y – Washington Capitals**	**SE**	**82**	**44**	**24**	**12**	**2**	**227**	**194**	102
**3**	**y – Toronto Maple Leafs**	**NE**	**82**	**45**	**27**	**7**	**3**	**246**	**222**	100
**4**	**New Jersey Devils**	**AT**	**82**	**45**	**24**	**8**	**5**	**251**	**203**	103
**5**	**Florida Panthers**	**SE**	**82**	**43**	**27**	**6**	**6**	**244**	**209**	98
**6**	**Ottawa Senators**	**NE**	**82**	**41**	**28**	**11**	**2**	**244**	**210**	95
**7**	**Pittsburgh Penguins**	**AT**	**82**	**37**	**31**	**8**	**6**	**241**	**236**	88
**8**	**Buffalo Sabres**	**NE**	**82**	**35**	**32**	**11**	**4**	**213**	**204**	85
8.5
9	Carolina Hurricanes	SE	82	37	35	10	0	217	216	84
10	Montreal Canadiens	NE	82	35	34	9	4	196	194	83
11	New York Rangers	AT	82	29	38	12	3	218	246	73
12	Boston Bruins	NE	82	24	33	19	6	210	248	73
13	New York Islanders	AT	82	24	48	9	1	194	275	58
14	Tampa Bay Lightning	SE	82	19	47	9	7	204	310	54
15	Atlanta Thrashers	SE	82	14	57	7	4	170	313	39

Divisions: AT – Atlantic, NE – Northeast, SE – Southeast

bold – Qualified for playoffs; z – Won conference; y – Won division

== Schedule and results ==
1999–2000 regular season
October: 3–5–1–1 (home: 2–2–1–1; road: 1–3–0–0)

Game	Date	Score	Opponent	Record	Recap
1	October 2, 1999	4–2	New York Islanders (1999–2000)	1–0–0–0	W
2	October 7, 1999	2–5	Los Angeles Kings (1999–2000)	1–1–0–0	L
3	October 9, 1999	0–1	@ New Jersey Devils (1999–2000)	1–2–0–0	L
4	October 15, 1999	2–3	Mighty Ducks of Anaheim (1999–2000)	1–3–0–0	L
5	October 16, 1999	4–4 OT	Atlanta Thrashers (1999–2000)	1–3–1–0	T
6	October 19, 1999	5–6 OT	Vancouver Canucks (1999–2000)	1–3–1–1	OTL
7	October 23, 1999	2–1	Calgary Flames (1999–2000)	2–3–1–1	W
8	October 27, 1999	3–4	@ Buffalo Sabres (1999–2000)	2–4–1–1	L
9	October 28, 1999	3–7	@ Boston Bruins (1999–2000)	2–5–1–1	L
10	October 30, 1999	2–1	@ Dallas Stars (1999–2000)	3–5–1–1	W

November: 5–6–1–1 (home: 4–1–1–1; road: 1–5–0–0)

Game	Date	Score	Opponent	Record	Recap
11	November 3, 1999	1–4	@ Atlanta Thrashers (1999–2000)	3–6–1–1	L
12	November 6, 1999	7–4	@ Pittsburgh Penguins (1999–2000)	4–6–1–1	W
13	November 7, 1999	3–2	Detroit Red Wings (1999–2000)	5–6–1–1	W
14	November 9, 1999	1–2	@ Washington Capitals (1999–2000)	5–7–1–1	L
15	November 12, 1999	4–2	Buffalo Sabres (1999–2000)	6–7–1–1	W
16	November 13, 1999	2–4	@ Carolina Hurricanes (1999–2000)	6–8–1–1	L
17	November 17, 1999	4–5	@ Atlanta Thrashers (1999–2000)	6–9–1–1	L
18	November 18, 1999	2–1	Pittsburgh Penguins (1999–2000)	7–9–1–1	W
19	November 20, 1999	1–4	@ Philadelphia Flyers (1999–2000)	7–10–1–1	L
20	November 22, 1999	4–1	Philadelphia Flyers (1999–2000)	8–10–1–1	W
21	November 24, 1999	3–6	New York Rangers (1999–2000)	8–11–1–1	L
22	November 26, 1999	3–3 OT	Carolina Hurricanes (1999–2000)	8–11–2–1	T
23	November 28, 1999	2–3 OT	Buffalo Sabres (1999–2000)	8–11–2–2	OTL

December: 2–6–3–1 (home: 1–2–1–0; road: 1–4–2–1)

Game	Date	Score	Opponent	Record	Recap
24	December 1, 1999	4–2	@ Mighty Ducks of Anaheim (1999–2000)	9–11–2–2	W
25	December 2, 1999	1–3	@ Phoenix Coyotes (1999–2000)	9–12–2–2	L
26	December 4, 1999	3–3 OT	@ Los Angeles Kings (1999–2000)	9–12–3–2	T
27	December 6, 1999	3–3 OT	@ San Jose Sharks (1999–2000)	9–12–4–2	T
28	December 10, 1999	3–2	Carolina Hurricanes (1999–2000)	10–12–4–2	W
29	December 14, 1999	4–4 OT	Nashville Predators (1999–2000)	10–12–5–2	T
30	December 18, 1999	0–4	@ Philadelphia Flyers (1999–2000)	10–13–5–2	L
31	December 19, 1999	4–5 OT	@ New York Rangers (1999–2000)	10–13–5–3	OTL
32	December 21, 1999	2–4	Toronto Maple Leafs (1999–2000)	10–14–5–3	L
33	December 23, 1999	3–4	@ Pittsburgh Penguins (1999–2000)	10–15–5–3	L
34	December 26, 1999	3–6	@ Atlanta Thrashers (1999–2000)	10–16–5–3	L
35	December 27, 1999	1–6	Florida Panthers (1999–2000)	10–17–5–3	L

January: 2–10–1–1 (home: 2–5–0–0; road: 0–5–1–1)

Game	Date	Score	Opponent	Record	Recap
36	January 1, 2000	5–7	@ Florida Panthers (1999–2000)	10–18–5–3	L
37	January 5, 2000	3–3 OT	@ Vancouver Canucks (1999–2000)	10–18–6–3	T
38	January 7, 2000	1–5	@ Edmonton Oilers (1999–2000)	10–19–6–3	L
39	January 8, 2000	2–3 OT	@ Calgary Flames (1999–2000)	10–19–6–4	OTL
40	January 11, 2000	5–6	New Jersey Devils (1999–2000)	10–20–6–4	L
41	January 13, 2000	4–2	New York Islanders (1999–2000)	11–20–6–4	W
42	January 15, 2000	2–5	Florida Panthers (1999–2000)	11–21–6–4	L
43	January 17, 2000	3–6	Washington Capitals (1999–2000)	11–22–6–4	L
44	January 20, 2000	2–4	Boston Bruins (1999–2000)	11–23–6–4	L
45	January 22, 2000	0–2	@ New York Islanders (1999–2000)	11–24–6–4	L
46	January 24, 2000	2–8	@ Washington Capitals (1999–2000)	11–25–6–4	L
47	January 25, 2000	1–2	@ Buffalo Sabres (1999–2000)	11–26–6–4	L
48	January 28, 2000	3–7	Edmonton Oilers (1999–2000)	11–27–6–4	L
49	January 29, 2000	2–1	Atlanta Thrashers (1999–2000)	12–27–6–4	W

February: 3–6–1–2 (home: 2–3–1–1; road: 1–3–0–1)

Game	Date	Score	Opponent	Record	Recap
50	February 1, 2000	3–5	Toronto Maple Leafs (1999–2000)	12–28–6–4	L
51	February 3, 2000	1–2 OT	Montreal Canadiens (1999–2000)	12–28–6–5	OTL
52	February 8, 2000	0–8	San Jose Sharks (1999–2000)	12–29–6–5	L
53	February 10, 2000	4–5 OT	@ New York Islanders (1999–2000)	12–29–6–6	OTL
54	February 12, 2000	2–5	Carolina Hurricanes (1999–2000)	12–30–6–6	L
55	February 15, 2000	2–2 OT	New York Rangers (1999–2000)	12–30–7–6	T
56	February 17, 2000	2–6	@ Ottawa Senators (1999–2000)	12–31–7–6	L
57	February 19, 2000	2–4	@ Carolina Hurricanes (1999–2000)	12–32–7–6	L
58	February 21, 2000	2–1	Pittsburgh Penguins (1999–2000)	13–32–7–6	W
59	February 24, 2000	5–4	Ottawa Senators (1999–2000)	14–32–7–6	W
60	February 26, 2000	3–2	@ Nashville Predators (1999–2000)	15–32–7–6	W
61	February 27, 2000	1–3	@ Detroit Red Wings (1999–2000)	15–33–7–6	L

March: 3–10–1–1 (home: 1–6–0–1; road: 2–4–1–0)

Game	Date	Score	Opponent	Record	Recap
62	March 1, 2000	2–4	Washington Capitals (1999–2000)	15–34–7–6	L
63	March 3, 2000	1–5	@ Chicago Blackhawks (1999–2000)	15–35–7–6	L
64	March 4, 2000	1–4	@ Colorado Avalanche (1999–2000)	15–36–7–6	L
65	March 8, 2000	2–3 OT	Philadelphia Flyers (1999–2000)	15–36–7–7	OTL
66	March 10, 2000	3–4	Florida Panthers (1999–2000)	15–37–7–7	L
67	March 12, 2000	1–4	Chicago Blackhawks (1999–2000)	15–38–7–7	L
68	March 14, 2000	4–3	@ Montreal Canadiens (1999–2000)	16–38–7–7	W
69	March 15, 2000	4–4 OT	@ New York Rangers (1999–2000)	16–38–8–7	T
70	March 17, 2000	3–1	@ New Jersey Devils (1999–2000)	17–38–8–7	W
71	March 19, 2000	2–5	@ Washington Capitals (1999–2000)	17–39–8–7	L
72	March 21, 2000	0–4	@ Boston Bruins (1999–2000)	17–40–8–7	L
73	March 24, 2000	1–5	St. Louis Blues (1999–2000)	17–41–8–7	L
74	March 26, 2000	1–3	Montreal Canadiens (1999–2000)	17–42–8–7	L
75	March 28, 2000	2–4	Dallas Stars (1999–2000)	17–43–8–7	L
76	March 30, 2000	6–3	Ottawa Senators (1999–2000)	18–43–8–7	W

April: 1–4–1–0 (home: 1–1–0–0; road: 0–3–1–0)

Game	Date	Score	Opponent	Record	Recap
77	April 1, 2000	3–3 OT	@ Florida Panthers (1999–2000)	18–43–9–7	T
78	April 2, 2000	1–4	New Jersey Devils (1999–2000)	18–44–9–7	L
79	April 4, 2000	5–4	Boston Bruins (1999–2000)	19–44–9–7	W
80	April 6, 2000	1–5	@ Montreal Canadiens (1999–2000)	19–45–9–7	L
81	April 8, 2000	2–4	@ Toronto Maple Leafs (1999–2000)	19–46–9–7	L
82	April 9, 2000	2–5	@ Ottawa Senators (1999–2000)	19–47–9–7	L

Legend: W Win (2 points) L Loss (0 points) T Tie (1 point) OTL Overtime loss (1 point)

== Player statistics ==
=== Scoring ===
- Position abbreviations: C = Center; D = Defense; G = Goaltender; LW = Left wing; RW = Right wing
- † = Joined team via a transaction (e.g., trade, waivers, signing) during the season. Stats reflect time with the Lightning only.
- ‡ = Left team via a transaction (e.g., trade, waivers, release) during the season. Stats reflect time with the Lightning only.

No.	Player	Pos	Regular season					
No.	Player	Pos	GP	G	A	Pts	+/-	PIM
4	Vincent Lecavalier	C	80	25	42	67	−25	43
33	Fredrik Modin	LW	80	22	26	48	−26	18
26	Mike Sillinger‡	C	67	19	25	44	−29	86
77	Chris Gratton‡	C	58	14	27	41	−24	121
16	Darcy Tucker‡	RW	50	14	20	34	−15	108
20	Stan Drulia	RW	68	11	22	33	−18	24
13	Pavel Kubina	D	69	8	18	26	−19	93
23	Petr Svoboda	D	70	2	23	25	−11	170
8	Todd Warriner†	LW	55	11	13	24	−14	34
10 (Note: Johnson wore number 11 in his first game.)	Mike Johnson†	RW	28	10	12	22	−2	4
2 (Note: Mara wore number 22 in his first game.)	Paul Mara	D	54	7	11	18	−27	73
14	Robert Petrovicky	C	43	7	10	17	2	14
17	Steve Guolla‡	C	46	6	10	16	2	11
25	Dan Kesa	RW	50	4	10	14	−11	21
44	Stephane Richer‡	RW	20	7	5	12	2	4
19	Steve Martins†	C	57	5	7	12	−11	37
30	Andrei Zyuzin	D	34	2	9	11	−11	33
15	Jaroslav Svejkovsky†	RW	29	5	5	10	−7	28
5	Bruce Gardiner†	RW	41	3	6	9	−21	37
7	Ben Clymer	RW	60	2	6	8	−26	87
9 (Note: Holzinger wore number 17 in his first game.)	Brian Holzinger†	C	14	3	3	6	−7	21
3	Sergey Gusev	D	28	2	3	5	−9	6
21	Andreas Johansson‡	C	12	2	3	5	1	8
22	Wayne Primeau†	C	17	2	3	5	−4	25
28	Nils Ekman†	LW	28	2	2	4	−8	36
2	Bill Houlder‡	D	14	1	2	3	−3	2
8	Michael Nylander‡	C	11	1	2	3	−3	4
18	Marek Posmyk†	D	18	1	2	3	1	20
27	Jassen Cullimore	D	46	1	1	2	−12	66
42	Matt Elich	RW	8	1	1	2	−1	0
25	Dwayne Hay†	LW	13	1	1	2	0	2
22	Chris McAlpine†‡	D	10	1	1	2	−5	10
6	Bryan Muir†	D	30	1	1	2	−8	32
11	Shawn Burr	LW	4	0	2	2	2	0
17	Ryan Johnson†	C	14	0	2	2	−9	2
21	Cory Sarich†	D	17	0	2	2	−8	42
29	Pavel Torgaev†‡	LW	5	0	2	2	1	2
24 (Note: Simpson wore number 28 in his first twelve games.)	Reid Simpson†	LW	26	1	0	1	−3	103
49	Kaspars Astashenko	D	8	0	1	1	−2	4
1	Zac Bierk	G	12	0	1	1		0
34	Gordie Dwyer†	LW	24	0	1	1	−6	135
51	Dale Rominski	RW	3	0	1	1	1	2
29	Vyacheslav Butsayev‡	C	2	0	0	0	−2	0
39	Dan Cloutier	G	52	0	0	0		29
27	Colin Forbes‡	C	8	0	0	0	−4	18
43	Kyle Freadrich	LW	10	0	0	0	−1	39
56	Ian Herbers‡	D	37	0	0	0	−12	45
35	Kevin Hodson	G	24	0	0	0		2
35	Dieter Kochan†	G	5	0	0	0		0
31	Rich Parent†	G	14	0	0	0		2
93	Daren Puppa	G	5	0	0	0		2
9	Jeff Shevalier‡	LW	5	0	0	0	−1	2
46	Andrei Skopintsev	D	4	0	0	0	−4	6

=== Goaltending ===
- † = Joined team via a transaction (e.g., trade, waivers, signing) during the season. Stats reflect time with the Lightning only.

No.	Player	Regular season									
No.	Player	GP	W	L	T	SA	GA	GAA	SV%	SO	TOI
39	Dan Cloutier	52	9	30	3	1258	145	3.49	.885	0	2492
1	Zac Bierk	12	4	4	1	308	31	3.65	.899	0	509
35	Kevin Hodson	24	2	7	4	327	47	3.67	.856	0	769
31	Rich Parent†	14	2	7	1	353	43	3.70	.878	0	698
35	Dieter Kochan†	5	1	4	0	111	17	4.29	.847	0	238
93	Daren Puppa	5	1	2	0	129	19	4.58	.853	0	249

== Awards and records ==
=== Awards ===
Type	Award/honor	Recipient	Ref
League (in-season)	NHL All-Star Game selection	Petr Svoboda	

=== Milestones ===
Milestone	Player	Date	Ref
First game	Ben Clymer	October 16, 1999	
First game	Nils Ekman	December 10, 1999	
First game	Kyle Freadrich	January 1, 2000	
First game	Dale Rominski	January 13, 2000	
First game	Gordie Dwyer	February 12, 2000	
First game	Matt Elich	February 19, 2000	
First game	Marek Posmyk	February 21, 2000	
First game	Kaspars Astasenko	March 26, 2000	
First game	Dieter Kochan	March 28, 2000	
1,000th game played	Petr Svoboda	March 12, 2000	

== Draft picks ==
Tampa Bay's draft picks at the 1999 NHL entry draft held at the FleetCenter in Boston, Massachusetts.

Round	#	Player	Nationality	College/Junior/Club team (League)
2	47	Sheldon Keefe	Canada	Barrie Colts (OHL)
3	67	Evgeny Konstantinov	Russia	Ital Kazan 2 (Russia)
3	75	Brett Scheffelmaier	Canada	Medicine Hat Tigers (WHL)
3	88	Jimmie Olvestad	Sweden	Djurgardens IF (Sweden)
5	127	Kaspars Astasenko	Latvia	Cincinnati Cyclones (IHL)
5	148	Michal Lanicek	Czech Republic	Slavia Praha Jr. (Czech Republic)
6	182	Fedor Fedorov	Russia	Port Huron Border Cats (UHL)
7	187	Ivan Rachunek	Czech Republic	ZPS Zlin Jr. (Czech Republic)
8	216	Erkki Rajamaki	Finland	HIFK (Finland)
9	244	Mikko Kuparinen	Finland	Grand Rapids Griffins (IHL)

== See also ==
- 1999–2000 NHL season
