= 1999–2000 Montreal Canadiens season =

NHL hockey team season

1999–2000 Montreal Canadiens
- Division: 4th Northeast
- Conference: 9th Eastern
- 1999–2000 record: 35–34–9–4
- Home record: 18–17–5–1
- Road record: 17–17–4–3
- Goals for: 196
- Goals against: 194

Team information
- General manager: Rejean Houle
- Coach: Alain Vigneault
- Captain: Saku Koivu
- Alternate captains: Shayne Corson; Turner Stevenson
- Arena: Molson Centre
- Average attendance: 20,205 (95.0%)
- Minor league affiliates: Quebec Citadelles; Tallahassee Tiger Sharks

Team leaders
- Goals: Sergei Zholtok (26)
- Assists: Dainius Zubrus (28)
- Points: Martin Rucinsky (49)
- Penalty minutes: Shayne Corson (115)
- Plus/minus: Craig Rivet (+11)
- Wins: Jeff Hackett (23)
- Goals against average: Jose Theodore (2.10)

The 1999–2000 Montreal Canadiens season was the club's 91st season of play. The club failed to qualify for the 2000 Stanley Cup playoffs for a second year in a row. It was only the second time since the NHL's founding that the Canadiens had missed the playoffs in consecutive seasons, the first being three straight misses since the 1920–21 season to 1921–22 season.

The Canadiens did not have a player who reached at least 50 points throughout the season. Pierre Boivin replaced Ronald Corey as team president. On September 2, 1999, Molson executive James Arnett announced that Molson, owner since 1957, would put the franchise up for sale.

== Off season ==
Saku Koivu makes Canadiens history, as the first European to be named the team's captain. He succeeds Vincent Damphousse, who was traded the previous season.

== Regular season ==
=== Final standings ===
Northeast Division
No.	CR		GP	W	L	T	OTL	GF	GA	Pts
1	3	**Toronto Maple Leafs**	82	45	27	7	3	246	222	100
2	6	**Ottawa Senators**	82	41	28	11	2	244	210	95
3	8	**Buffalo Sabres**	82	35	32	11	4	213	204	85
4	10	Montreal Canadiens	82	35	34	9	4	196	194	83
5	11	Boston Bruins	82	24	33	19	6	210	248	73

Note: CR = Conference rank; GP = Games played; W = Wins; L = Losses; T = Ties; GF = Goals for; GA = Goals against; Pts = Points
Bolded teams qualified for the playoffs.

Eastern Conference
R		Div	GP	W	L	T	OTL	GF	GA	Pts
**1**	**z – Philadelphia Flyers**	**AT**	**82**	**45**	**22**	**12**	**3**	**237**	**179**	105
**2**	**y – Washington Capitals**	**SE**	**82**	**44**	**24**	**12**	**2**	**227**	**194**	102
**3**	**y – Toronto Maple Leafs**	**NE**	**82**	**45**	**27**	**7**	**3**	**246**	**222**	100
**4**	**New Jersey Devils**	**AT**	**82**	**45**	**24**	**8**	**5**	**251**	**203**	103
**5**	**Florida Panthers**	**SE**	**82**	**43**	**27**	**6**	**6**	**244**	**209**	98
**6**	**Ottawa Senators**	**NE**	**82**	**41**	**28**	**11**	**2**	**244**	**210**	95
**7**	**Pittsburgh Penguins**	**AT**	**82**	**37**	**31**	**8**	**6**	**241**	**236**	88
**8**	**Buffalo Sabres**	**NE**	**82**	**35**	**32**	**11**	**4**	**213**	**204**	85
8.5
9	Carolina Hurricanes	SE	82	37	35	10	0	217	216	84
10	Montreal Canadiens	NE	82	35	34	9	4	196	194	83
11	New York Rangers	AT	82	29	38	12	3	218	246	73
12	Boston Bruins	NE	82	24	33	19	6	210	248	73
13	New York Islanders	AT	82	24	48	9	1	194	275	58
14	Tampa Bay Lightning	SE	82	19	47	9	7	204	310	54
15	Atlanta Thrashers	SE	82	14	57	7	4	170	313	39

Divisions: AT – Atlantic, NE – Northeast, SE – Southeast

bold – Qualified for playoffs; z – Won conference; y – Won division

== Schedule and results ==
1999–2000 regular season
October: 3–8–1–0 (home: 1–5–1–0; road: 2–3–0–0)

Game	Date	Score	Opponent	Record	Points	Recap
1	October 2, 1999	1–4	Toronto Maple Leafs	0–1–0–0	0	L
2	October 6, 1999	1–2	@ Edmonton Oilers	0–2–0–0	0	L
3	October 8, 1999	4–1	@ Calgary Flames	1–2–0–0	2	W
4	October 9, 1999	1–4	@ Vancouver Canucks	1–3–0–0	2	L
5	October 12, 1999	1–2	Florida Panthers	1–4–0–0	2	L
6	October 14, 1999	5–4 OT	@ Philadelphia Flyers	2–4–0–0	4	W
7	October 16, 1999	2–1	Buffalo Sabres	3–4–0–0	6	W
8	October 18, 1999	2–4	New York Islanders	3–5–0–0	6	L
9	October 20, 1999	1–2	Colorado Avalanche	3–6–0–0	6	L
10	October 23, 1999	2–3	@ Toronto Maple Leafs	3–7–0–0	6	L
11	October 27, 1999	0–1	Chicago Blackhawks	3–8–0–0	6	L
12	October 30, 1999	2–2 OT	New York Rangers	3–8–1–0	7	T

November: 6–5–0–1 (home: 3–1–0–0; road: 3–4–0–1)

Game	Date	Score	Opponent	Record	Points	Recap
13	November 3, 1999	2–3	@ New Jersey Devils	3–9–1–0	7	L
14	November 4, 1999	1–2 OT	@ New York Islanders	3–9–1–1	8	OTL
15	November 6, 1999	1–2	@ Ottawa Senators	3–10–1–1	8	L
16	November 10, 1999	4–5	@ Pittsburgh Penguins	3–11–1–1	8	L
17	November 11, 1999	2–1	Mighty Ducks of Anaheim	4–11–1–1	10	W
18	November 13, 1999	4–2	Atlanta Thrashers	5–11–1–1	12	W
19	November 16, 1999	1–4	San Jose Sharks	5–12–1–1	12	L
20	November 18, 1999	1–6	@ Nashville Predators	5–13–1–1	12	L
21	November 20, 1999	5–3	@ Los Angeles Kings	6–13–1–1	14	W
22	November 22, 1999	2–1	@ Mighty Ducks of Anaheim	7–13–1–1	16	W
23	November 23, 1999	3–2 OT	@ San Jose Sharks	8–13–1–1	18	W
24	November 27, 1999	2–1	Vancouver Canucks	9–13–1–1	20	W

December: 3–7–3–0 (home: 1–5–1–0; road: 2–2–2–0)

Game	Date	Score	Opponent	Record	Points	Recap
25	December 1, 1999	2–3	Dallas Stars	9–14–1–1	20	L
26	December 3, 1999	2–3	@ New York Rangers	9–15–1–1	20	L
27	December 4, 1999	2–3	Philadelphia Flyers	9–16–1–1	20	L
28	December 7, 1999	3–3 OT	Calgary Flames	9–16–2–1	21	T
29	December 9, 1999	4–2	@ New York Islanders	10–16–2–1	23	W
30	December 11, 1999	2–4	Los Angeles Kings	10–17–2–1	23	L
31	December 13, 1999	1–0	@ Washington Capitals	11–17–2–1	25	W
32	December 16, 1999	1–2	New Jersey Devils	11–18–2–1	25	L
33	December 18, 1999	1–2	@ Toronto Maple Leafs	11–19–2–1	25	L
34	December 20, 1999	5–1	Pittsburgh Penguins	12–19–2–1	27	W
35	December 23, 1999	3–3 OT	@ Boston Bruins	12–19–3–1	28	T
36	December 27, 1999	4–4 OT	@ Ottawa Senators	12–19–4–1	29	T
37	December 29, 1999	2–3	Ottawa Senators	12–20–4–1	29	L

January: 5–3–3–1 (home: 4–0–3–0; road: 1–3–0–1)

Game	Date	Score	Opponent	Record	Points	Recap
38	January 2, 2000	2–2 OT	New York Rangers	12–20–5–1	30	T
39	January 4, 2000	1–6	@ Washington Capitals	12–21–5–1	30	L
40	January 6, 2000	3–4	@ St. Louis Blues	12–22–5–1	30	L
41	January 7, 2000	1–4	@ Colorado Avalanche	12–23–5–1	30	L
42	January 11, 2000	3–0	Detroit Red Wings	13–23–5–1	32	W
43	January 14, 2000	2–1	@ Buffalo Sabres	14–23–5–1	34	W
44	January 15, 2000	2–2 OT	Boston Bruins	14–23–6–1	35	T
45	January 19, 2000	3–0	New York Islanders	15–23–6–1	37	W
46	January 22, 2000	4–2	Pittsburgh Penguins	16–23–6–1	39	W
47	January 24, 2000	2–3 OT	@ Carolina Hurricanes	16–23–6–2	40	OTL
48	January 29, 2000	2–2 OT	Philadelphia Flyers	16–23–7–2	41	T
49	January 30, 2000	3–0	Carolina Hurricanes	17–23–7–2	43	W

February: 8–4–0–1 (home: 5–2–0–1; road: 3–2–0–0)

Game	Date	Score	Opponent	Record	Points	Recap
50	February 2, 2000	1–3	@ Florida Panthers	17–24–7–2	43	L
51	February 3, 2000	2–1 OT	@ Tampa Bay Lightning	18–24–7–2	45	W
52	February 8, 2000	4–5 OT	Edmonton Oilers	18–24–7–3	46	OTL
53	February 10, 2000	0–1	Washington Capitals	18–25–7–3	46	L
54	February 12, 2000	5–4	Ottawa Senators	19–25–7–3	48	W
55	February 14, 2000	4–1	Florida Panthers	20–25–7–3	50	W
56	February 16, 2000	5–1	@ Atlanta Thrashers	21–25–7–3	52	W
57	February 17, 2000	3–0	@ Carolina Hurricanes	22–25–7–3	54	W
58	February 19, 2000	2–1	Toronto Maple Leafs	23–25–7–3	56	W
59	February 22, 2000	1–0	Phoenix Coyotes	24–25–7–3	58	W
60	February 24, 2000	3–2 OT	New Jersey Devils	25–25–7–3	60	W
61	February 26, 2000	0–3	Washington Capitals	25–26–7–3	60	L
62	February 27, 2000	0–3	@ New Jersey Devils	25–27–7–3	60	L

March: 8–5–2–0 (home: 3–2–0–0; road: 5–3–2–0)

Game	Date	Score	Opponent	Record	Points	Recap
63	March 1, 2000	4–1	@ Chicago Blackhawks	26–27–7–3	62	W
64	March 2, 2000	5–2	@ Boston Bruins	27–27–7–3	64	W
65	March 4, 2000	3–4	@ Toronto Maple Leafs	27–28–7–3	64	L
66	March 6, 2000	3–2	Atlanta Thrashers	28–28–7–3	66	W
67	March 8, 2000	3–0	@ Pittsburgh Penguins	29–28–7–3	68	W
68	March 10, 2000	3–2	@ Buffalo Sabres	30–28–7–3	70	W
69	March 11, 2000	3–5	Boston Bruins	30–29–7–3	70	L
70	March 14, 2000	3–4	Tampa Bay Lightning	30–30–7–3	70	L
71	March 16, 2000	1–1 OT	@ Philadelphia Flyers	30–30–8–3	71	T
72	March 18, 2000	3–2	Carolina Hurricanes	31–30–8–3	73	W
73	March 20, 2000	1–4	@ Buffalo Sabres	31–31–8–3	73	L
74	March 22, 2000	1–1 OT	@ Atlanta Thrashers	31–31–9–3	74	T
75	March 25, 2000	2–4	@ Florida Panthers	31–32–9–3	74	L
76	March 26, 2000	3–1	@ Tampa Bay Lightning	32–32–9–3	76	W
77	March 29, 2000	4–3	Boston Bruins	33–32–9–3	78	W

April: 2–2–0–1 (home: 1–2–0–0; road: 1–0–0–1)

Game	Date	Score	Opponent	Record	Points	Recap
78	April 1, 2000	0–2	Buffalo Sabres	33–33–9–3	78	L
79	April 2, 2000	5–6 OT	@ Detroit Red Wings	33–33–9–4	79	OTL
80	April 5, 2000	3–0	@ New York Rangers	34–33–9–4	81	W
81	April 6, 2000	5–1	Tampa Bay Lightning	35–33–9–4	83	W
82	April 8, 2000	1–3	Ottawa Senators	35–34–9–4	83	L

Legend: W Win (2 points) L Loss (0 points) T Tie (1 point) OTL Overtime loss (1 point)

== Player statistics ==
=== Scoring ===
- Position abbreviations: C = Centre; D = Defence; G = Goaltender; LW = Left wing; RW = Right wing
- † = Joined team via a transaction (e.g., trade, waivers, signing) during the season. Stats reflect time with the Canadiens only.
- ‡ = Left team via a transaction (e.g., trade, waivers, release) during the season. Stats reflect time with the Canadiens only.

No.	Player	Pos	Regular season					
No.	Player	Pos	GP	G	A	Pts	+/-	PIM
26	Martin Rucinsky	LW	80	25	24	49	1	70
15	Dainius Zubrus	C	73	14	28	42	−1	54
34	Sergei Zholtok	C	68	26	12	38	2	28
43	Patrice Brisebois	D	54	10	25	35	−1	18
14	Trevor Linden	RW	50	13	17	30	−3	34
49	Brian Savage	LW	38	17	12	29	−4	19
17	Benoit Brunet	LW	50	14	15	29	3	13
22	Eric Weinrich	D	77	4	25	29	4	39
27	Shayne Corson	LW	70	8	20	28	−2	115
32	Oleg Petrov	RW	44	2	24	26	10	8
23	Turner Stevenson	RW	64	8	13	21	−1	61
11	Saku Koivu	C	24	3	18	21	7	14
28	Karl Dykhuis†	D	67	7	12	19	−3	40
63	Craig Darby	C	76	7	10	17	−14	14
52	Craig Rivet	D	61	3	14	17	11	76
51	Francis Bouillon	D	74	3	13	16	−7	38
37	Patrick Poulin	C	82	10	5	15	−15	17
40	Jesse Belanger	C	16	3	6	9	2	2
29	Jim Cummins	RW	47	3	5	8	−5	92
45	Arron Asham	RW	33	4	2	6	−7	24
55	Igor Ulanov‡	D	43	1	5	6	−11	76
20	Scott Lachance	D	57	0	6	6	−4	22
24	Scott Thornton‡	LW	35	2	3	5	−7	70
44	Sheldon Souray†	D	19	3	0	3	7	44
61	Jason Ward	RW	32	2	1	3	−1	10
48	Miloslav Guren	D	24	1	2	3	−5	12
47	Juha Lind†	C	13	1	2	3	−2	4
71	Mike Ribeiro	C	19	1	1	2	−6	2
46	Matt Higgins	C	25	0	2	2	−6	4
24	Christian Laflamme†	D	15	0	2	2	−5	8
21	Barry Richter	D	23	0	2	2	−5	8
6	Trent McCleary	RW	12	1	0	1	2	4
35	Andrei Bashkirov	LW	2	0	0	0	0	0
31	Jeff Hackett	G	56	0	0	0		4
38	Vladimir Malakhov‡	D	7	0	0	0	0	4
36	Dave Morissette	LW	1	0	0	0	0	5
44	Stephane Robidas	D	1	0	0	0	0	0
60	Jose Theodore	G	30	0	0	0		0

=== Goaltending ===
No.	Player	Regular season									
No.	Player	GP	W	L	T	SA	GA	GAA	SV%	SO	TOI
31	Jeff Hackett	56	23	25	7	1543	132	2.40	.914	3	3301
60	Jose Theodore	30	12	13	2	717	58	2.10	.919	3	1655

== Awards and records ==
=== Awards ===
Head coach Alain Vigneault was a runner-up for the Jack Adams Trophy.

Type	Award/honour	Recipient	Ref
League (in-season)	NHL All-Star Game selection	Martin Rucinsky	
League (in-season)	NHL Player of the Week	Jose Theodore (November 29) (Note: Co-winner with Jeremy Roenick of the Phoenix Coyotes.)	
Team	Jacques Beauchamp Molson Trophy	Eric Weinrich	
Team	Molson Cup	Jeff Hackett	

=== Milestones ===
Milestone	Player	Date	Ref
First game	Francis Bouillon	October 2, 1999	
First game	Mike Ribeiro	October 2, 1999	
First game	Stephane Robidas	October 20, 1999	
First game	Jason Ward	December 3, 1999	

== Draft picks ==
Montreal's draft picks at the 1999 NHL entry draft held at the FleetCenter in Boston, Massachusetts.

Round	#	Player	Nationality	College/Junior/Club team (League)
2	39	Alexander Buturlin	Russia	CSKA Moscow (Russia)
2	58	Matt Carkner	Canada	Peterborough Petes (OHL)
4	97	Chris Dyment	United States	Boston University (NCAA)
4	107	Evan Lindsay	Canada	Prince Albert Raiders (WHL)
5	136	Dustin Jamieson	Canada	Sarnia Sting (OHL)
5	145	Marc-Andre Thinel	Canada	Victoriaville Tigres (QMJHL)
5	150	Matt Shasby	United States	Des Moines Buccaneers (USHL)
6	167	Sean Dixon	Canada	Erie Otters (OHL)
7	196	Vadim Tarasov	Kazakhstan	Metallurg Novokuznetsk (Russia)
8	225	Mikko Hyytia	Finland	JYP Jr. (Finland)
9	253	Jerome Marois	Canada	Quebec Remparts (QMJHL)

== See also ==
- 1999–2000 NHL season
