= 1999–2000 Washington Capitals season =

NHL hockey team season

1999–2000 Washington Capitals
- Southeast Division champions
- Division: 1st Southeast
- Conference: 2nd Eastern
- 1999–2000 record: 44–24–12–2
- Home record: 26–5–8–2
- Road record: 18–19–4–0
- Goals for: 227
- Goals against: 194

Team information
- General manager: George McPhee
- Coach: Ron Wilson
- Captain: Adam Oates
- Arena: MCI Center
- Average attendance: 14,485
- Minor league affiliates: Portland Pirates; Hampton Roads Admirals; Quad City Mallards

Team leaders
- Goals: Chris Simon (29)
- Assists: Adam Oates (56)
- Points: Adam Oates (71)
- Penalty minutes: Chris Simon (146)
- Plus/minus: Sergei Gonchar (+26)
- Wins: Olaf Kolzig (41)
- Goals against average: Olaf Kolzig (2.24)

The 1999–2000 Washington Capitals season was the Washington Capitals 26th season in the National Hockey League (NHL).

== Offseason ==
Owner Abe Pollin sold the Capitals to an investor group headed by America Online president Ted Leonsis on May 12, 1999.

== Regular season ==
The Capitals tied the St. Louis Blues for the fewest short-handed goals allowed, with just 3.

=== Final standings ===
Southeast Division
No.	CR		GP	W	L	T	OTL	GF	GA	Pts
1	2	**Washington Capitals**	82	44	24	12	2	227	194	102
2	5	**Florida Panthers**	82	43	27	6	6	244	209	98
3	9	Carolina Hurricanes	82	37	35	10	0	217	216	84
4	14	Tampa Bay Lightning	82	19	47	9	7	204	310	54
5	15	Atlanta Thrashers	82	14	57	7	4	170	313	39

Note: CR = Conference rank; GP = Games played; W = Wins; L = Losses; T = Ties; OTL=Overtime loss; GF = Goals for; GA = Goals against; PIM=Penalties in Minutes; Pts = Points
Bolded teams qualified for the playoffs.

Eastern Conference
R		Div	GP	W	L	T	OTL	GF	GA	Pts
**1**	**z – Philadelphia Flyers**	**AT**	**82**	**45**	**22**	**12**	**3**	**237**	**179**	105
**2**	**y – Washington Capitals**	**SE**	**82**	**44**	**24**	**12**	**2**	**227**	**194**	102
**3**	**y – Toronto Maple Leafs**	**NE**	**82**	**45**	**27**	**7**	**3**	**246**	**222**	100
**4**	**New Jersey Devils**	**AT**	**82**	**45**	**24**	**8**	**5**	**251**	**203**	103
**5**	**Florida Panthers**	**SE**	**82**	**43**	**27**	**6**	**6**	**244**	**209**	98
**6**	**Ottawa Senators**	**NE**	**82**	**41**	**28**	**11**	**2**	**244**	**210**	95
**7**	**Pittsburgh Penguins**	**AT**	**82**	**37**	**31**	**8**	**6**	**241**	**236**	88
**8**	**Buffalo Sabres**	**NE**	**82**	**35**	**32**	**11**	**4**	**213**	**204**	85
8.5
9	Carolina Hurricanes	SE	82	37	35	10	0	217	216	84
10	Montreal Canadiens	NE	82	35	34	9	4	196	194	83
11	New York Rangers	AT	82	29	38	12	3	218	246	73
12	Boston Bruins	NE	82	24	33	19	6	210	248	73
13	New York Islanders	AT	82	24	48	9	1	194	275	58
14	Tampa Bay Lightning	SE	82	19	47	9	7	204	310	54
15	Atlanta Thrashers	SE	82	14	57	7	4	170	313	39

Divisions: AT – Atlantic, NE – Northeast, SE – Southeast

bold – Qualified for playoffs; z – Won conference; y – Won division

== Schedule and results ==
=== Regular season ===
1999–2000 regular season
October: 2–6–2–0 (home: 1–2–1–0; road: 1–4–1–0)

Game	Date	Score	Opponent	Record	Recap
1	October 2, 1999	3–4	@ Florida Panthers (1999–2000)	0–1–0–0	L
2	October 8, 1999	3–2	@ Buffalo Sabres (1999–2000)	1–1–0–0	W
3	October 9, 1999	2–2 OT	Los Angeles Kings (1999–2000)	1–1–1–0	T
4	October 12, 1999	5–4	Philadelphia Flyers (1999–2000)	2–1–1–0	W
5	October 16, 1999	2–3	San Jose Sharks (1999–2000)	2–2–1–0	L
6	October 19, 1999	1–7	Mighty Ducks of Anaheim (1999–2000)	2–3–1–0	L
7	October 23, 1999	2–2 OT	@ Phoenix Coyotes (1999–2000)	2–3–2–0	T
8	October 26, 1999	2–5	@ Los Angeles Kings (1999–2000)	2–4–2–0	L
9	October 29, 1999	2–5	@ Mighty Ducks of Anaheim (1999–2000)	2–5–2–0	L
10	October 31, 1999	1–2	@ San Jose Sharks (1999–2000)	2–6–2–0	L

November: 7–3–2–1 (home: 5–0–2–1; road: 2–3–0–0)

Game	Date	Score	Opponent	Record	Recap
11	November 3, 1999	3–1	Ottawa Senators (1999–2000)	3–6–2–0	W
12	November 5, 1999	5–3	Toronto Maple Leafs (1999–2000)	4–6–2–0	W
13	November 7, 1999	2–3	@ Carolina Hurricanes (1999–2000)	4–7–2–0	L
14	November 9, 1999	2–1	Tampa Bay Lightning (1999–2000)	5–7–2–0	W
15	November 11, 1999	4–5 OT	New York Rangers (1999–2000)	5–7–2–1	OTL
16	November 13, 1999	4–2	New Jersey Devils (1999–2000)	6–7–2–1	W
17	November 17, 1999	2–2 OT	Dallas Stars (1999–2000)	6–7–3–1	T
18	November 19, 1999	3–3 OT	Carolina Hurricanes (1999–2000)	6–7–4–1	T
19	November 20, 1999	3–0	@ Boston Bruins (1999–2000)	7–7–4–1	W
20	November 24, 1999	2–5	@ Buffalo Sabres (1999–2000)	7–8–4–1	L
21	November 26, 1999	1–0	Nashville Predators (1999–2000)	8–8–4–1	W
22	November 27, 1999	4–3	@ New York Islanders (1999–2000)	9–8–4–1	W
23	November 29, 1999	1–3	@ Toronto Maple Leafs (1999–2000)	9–9–4–1	L

December: 4–6–2–0 (home: 2–1–2–0; road: 2–5–0–0)

Game	Date	Score	Opponent	Record	Recap
24	December 2, 1999	2–2 OT	Boston Bruins (1999–2000)	9–9–5–1	T
25	December 4, 1999	1–2	@ Florida Panthers (1999–2000)	9–10–5–1	L
26	December 7, 1999	4–2	New York Islanders (1999–2000)	10–10–5–1	W
27	December 9, 1999	0–3	@ Pittsburgh Penguins (1999–2000)	10–11–5–1	L
28	December 13, 1999	0–1	Montreal Canadiens (1999–2000)	10–12–5–1	L
29	December 15, 1999	4–0	@ Atlanta Thrashers (1999–2000)	11–12–5–1	W
30	December 17, 1999	3–2 OT	@ New York Rangers (1999–2000)	12–12–5–1	W
31	December 18, 1999	4–5	@ New Jersey Devils (1999–2000)	12–13–5–1	L
32	December 21, 1999	2–6	@ Edmonton Oilers (1999–2000)	12–14–5–1	L
33	December 22, 1999	3–6	@ Vancouver Canucks (1999–2000)	12–15–5–1	L
34	December 27, 1999	2–2 OT	Chicago Blackhawks (1999–2000)	12–15–6–1	T
35	December 29, 1999	3–2 OT	Pittsburgh Penguins (1999–2000)	13–15–6–1	W

January: 11–1–2–0 (home: 7–0–1–0; road: 4–1–1–0)

Game	Date	Score	Opponent	Record	Recap
36	January 1, 2000	1–1 OT	St. Louis Blues (1999–2000)	13–15–7–1	T
37	January 4, 2000	6–1	Montreal Canadiens (1999–2000)	14–15–7–1	W
38	January 6, 2000	1–3	@ Atlanta Thrashers (1999–2000)	14–16–7–1	L
39	January 8, 2000	3–0	Atlanta Thrashers (1999–2000)	15–16–7–1	W
40	January 12, 2000	5–2	@ Atlanta Thrashers (1999–2000)	16–16–7–1	W
41	January 14, 2000	3–2 OT	@ New Jersey Devils (1999–2000)	17–16–7–1	W
42	January 16, 2000	2–1	Ottawa Senators (1999–2000)	18–16–7–1	W
43	January 17, 2000	6–3	@ Tampa Bay Lightning (1999–2000)	19–16–7–1	W
44	January 19, 2000	3–1	@ Florida Panthers (1999–2000)	20–16–7–1	W
45	January 22, 2000	5–5 OT	@ Toronto Maple Leafs (1999–2000)	20–16–8–1	T
46	January 24, 2000	8–2	Tampa Bay Lightning (1999–2000)	21–16–8–1	W
47	January 26, 2000	2–1	Calgary Flames (1999–2000)	22–16–8–1	W
48	January 28, 2000	3–2 OT	Phoenix Coyotes (1999–2000)	23–16–8–1	W
49	January 30, 2000	2–0	Philadelphia Flyers (1999–2000)	24–16–8–1	W

February: 8–4–2–0 (home: 3–1–0–0; road: 5–3–2–0)

Game	Date	Score	Opponent	Record	Recap
50	February 1, 2000	2–3	@ Pittsburgh Penguins (1999–2000)	24–17–8–1	L
51	February 3, 2000	2–1	Carolina Hurricanes (1999–2000)	25–17–8–1	W
52	February 8, 2000	2–2 OT	@ Boston Bruins (1999–2000)	25–17–9–1	T
53	February 10, 2000	1–0	@ Montreal Canadiens (1999–2000)	26–17–9–1	W
54	February 12, 2000	4–2	@ Nashville Predators (1999–2000)	27–17–9–1	W
55	February 13, 2000	1–2	@ Dallas Stars (1999–2000)	27–18–9–1	L
56	February 15, 2000	2–1	Colorado Avalanche (1999–2000)	28–18–9–1	W
57	February 18, 2000	5–4	@ Chicago Blackhawks (1999–2000)	29–18–9–1	W
58	February 19, 2000	2–4	@ Philadelphia Flyers (1999–2000)	29–19–9–1	L
59	February 21, 2000	1–1 OT	@ Carolina Hurricanes (1999–2000)	29–19–10–1	T
60	February 23, 2000	3–2 OT	Florida Panthers (1999–2000)	30–19–10–1	W
61	February 25, 2000	0–3	Boston Bruins (1999–2000)	30–20–10–1	L
62	February 26, 2000	3–0	@ Montreal Canadiens (1999–2000)	31–20–10–1	W
63	February 28, 2000	3–2	@ New York Islanders (1999–2000)	32–20–10–1	W

March: 10–2–1–1 (home: 7–0–1–1; road: 3–2–0–0)

Game	Date	Score	Opponent	Record	Recap
64	March 1, 2000	4–2	@ Tampa Bay Lightning (1999–2000)	33–20–10–1	W
65	March 3, 2000	2–2 OT	Detroit Red Wings (1999–2000)	33–20–11–1	T
66	March 5, 2000	2–1	Buffalo Sabres (1999–2000)	34–20–11–1	W
67	March 7, 2000	4–2	Florida Panthers (1999–2000)	35–20–11–1	W
68	March 9, 2000	1–3	@ Philadelphia Flyers (1999–2000)	35–21–11–1	L
69	March 11, 2000	4–2	New Jersey Devils (1999–2000)	36–21–11–1	W
70	March 15, 2000	4–3	New York Islanders (1999–2000)	37–21–11–1	W
71	March 17, 2000	4–2	Carolina Hurricanes (1999–2000)	38–21–11–1	W
72	March 19, 2000	5–2	Tampa Bay Lightning (1999–2000)	39–21–11–1	W
73	March 20, 2000	1–2	@ St. Louis Blues (1999–2000)	39–22–11–1	L
74	March 23, 2000	4–1	@ New York Rangers (1999–2000)	40–22–11–1	W
75	March 25, 2000	4–3	@ Ottawa Senators (1999–2000)	41–22–11–1	W
76	March 28, 2000	5–2	Atlanta Thrashers (1999–2000)	42–22–11–1	W
77	March 30, 2000	3–4 OT	Pittsburgh Penguins (1999–2000)	42–22–11–2	OTL

April: 2–2–1–0 (home: 1–1–1–0; road: 1–1–0–0)

Game	Date	Score	Opponent	Record	Recap
78	April 1, 2000	3–4	Toronto Maple Leafs (1999–2000)	42–23–11–2	L
79	April 3, 2000	4–1	New York Rangers (1999–2000)	43–23–11–2	W
80	April 4, 2000	0–4	@ Ottawa Senators (1999–2000)	43–24–11–2	L
81	April 7, 2000	4–2	@ Detroit Red Wings (1999–2000)	44–24–11–2	W
82	April 9, 2000	1–1 OT	Buffalo Sabres (1999–2000)	44–24–12–2	T

Legend: W Win (2 points) L Loss (0 points) T Tie (1 point) OTL Overtime loss (1 point)

=== Playoffs ===
2000 Stanley Cup playoffs
Eastern Conference Quarterfinals vs. (7) Pittsburgh Penguins – Penguins win 4–1

Game	Date	Score	Opponent	Series	Recap
1	April 13, 2000	0–7	Pittsburgh Penguins	Penguins lead 1–0	L
2	April 15, 2000	1–2 OT	Pittsburgh Penguins	Penguins lead 2–0	L
3	April 17, 2000	3–4	@ Pittsburgh Penguins	Penguins lead 3–0	L
4	April 19, 2000	3–2	@ Pittsburgh Penguins	Penguins lead 3–1	W
5	April 21, 2000	1–2	Pittsburgh Penguins	Penguins win 4–1	L

Legend: W Win L Loss

== Player statistics ==
=== Scoring ===
- Position abbreviations: C = Center; D = Defense; G = Goaltender; LW = Left wing; RW = Right wing
- † = Joined team via a transaction (e.g., trade, waivers, signing) during the season. Stats reflect time with the Capitals only.
- ‡ = Left team via a transaction (e.g., trade, waivers, release) during the season. Stats reflect time with the Capitals only.

No.	Player	Pos	Regular season						Playoffs					
No.	Player	Pos	GP	G	A	Pts	+/-	PIM	GP	G	A	Pts	+/-	PIM
77	Adam Oates	C	82	15	56	71	13	14	5	0	3	3	0	4
55	Sergei Gonchar	D	73	18	36	54	26	52	5	1	0	1	−3	6
17	Chris Simon	LW	75	29	20	49	11	146	4	2	0	2	1	24
22	Steve Konowalchuk	LW	82	16	27	43	19	80	5	1	0	1	0	2
12	Peter Bondra	RW	62	21	17	38	5	30	5	1	1	2	−4	4
10	Ulf Dahlen	LW	75	15	23	38	11	8	5	0	1	1	−1	2
44	Richard Zednik	RW	69	19	16	35	6	54	5	0	0	0	−1	5
6	Calle Johansson	D	82	7	25	32	13	24	5	1	2	3	−4	0
8	Jan Bulis	C	56	9	22	31	7	30	—	—	—	—	—	—
11	Jeff Halpern	C	79	18	11	29	21	39	5	2	1	3	−1	0
13	Andrei Nikolishin	C	76	11	14	25	6	28	5	0	2	2	−3	4
14	Joe Sacco	RW	79	7	16	23	7	50	5	0	0	0	−2	4
15	Dmitri Mironov	D	73	3	19	22	7	28	4	0	0	0	2	4
2	Ken Klee	D	80	7	13	20	8	79	5	0	1	1	−1	10
20	Glen Metropolit	C	30	6	13	19	5	4	2	0	0	0	−1	2
28	James Black	LW	49	8	9	17	−1	6	—	—	—	—	—	—
9	Joe Murphy†	RW	29	5	8	13	8	53	5	0	0	0	−2	8
27	Terry Yake†	C	35	6	5	11	2	12	3	0	0	0	−2	0
19	Brendan Witt	D	77	1	7	8	5	114	3	0	0	0	−3	0
29	Joe Reekie	D	59	0	7	7	21	50	5	0	1	1	−1	2
33	Jim McKenzie†	LW	30	1	2	3	0	16	1	0	0	0	0	0
34	Jaroslav Svejkovsky‡	RW	23	1	2	3	−7	2	—	—	—	—	—	—
21	Jeff Toms	C	20	1	2	3	−1	4	—	—	—	—	—	—
36	Mike Eagles	LW	25	2	0	2	−7	15	—	—	—	—	—	—
4	Alexei Tezikov	D	23	1	1	2	−2	2	—	—	—	—	—	—
37	Olaf Kolzig	G	73	0	2	2		6	5	0	0	0		0
24	Rob Zettler	D	12	0	2	2	−1	19	5	0	0	0	−2	2
38	Nolan Baumgartner	D	8	0	1	1	1	2	—	—	—	—	—	—
23	Miika Elomo	LW	2	0	1	1	1	2	—	—	—	—	—	—
1	Craig Billington	G	13	0	0	0		0	1	0	0	0		0
3	Jamie Huscroft	D	7	0	0	0	−5	11	—	—	—	—	—	—
25	Barrie Moore	LW	1	0	0	0	0	0	—	—	—	—	—	—
39	Alexandre Volchkov‡	C	3	0	0	0	−2	0	—	—	—	—	—	—
23	Trent Whitfield	C	—	—	—	—	—	—	3	0	0	0	0	0

=== Goaltending ===
No.	Player	Regular season										Playoffs								
No.	Player	GP	W	L	T	SA	GA	GAA	SV%	SO	TOI	GP	W	L	SA	GA	GAA	SV%	SO	TOI
37	Olaf Kolzig	73	41	20	11	1957	163	2.24	.917	5	4371	5	1	4	103	16	3.38	.845	0	284
1	Craig Billington	13	3	6	1	310	28	2.75	.910	2	611	1	0	0	6	1	3.00	.833	0	20

== Awards and records ==
=== Awards ===
Type	Award/honor	Recipient	Ref
League (annual)	NHL First All-Star Team	Olaf Kolzig (Goaltender)	
League (annual)	Vezina Trophy	Olaf Kolzig	
League (in-season)	NHL All-Star Game selection	Olaf Kolzig	
League (in-season)	NHL Player of the Month	Olaf Kolzig (January)	
League (in-season)	NHL Player of the Week	Sergei Gonchar (January 31)	
League (in-season)	NHL Player of the Week	Olaf Kolzig (March 6)	
League (in-season)	NHL Rookie of the Month	Jeff Halpern (March)	

=== Milestones ===
Milestone	Player	Date	Ref
First game	Jeff Halpern	October 2, 1999	
First game	Glen Metropolit	October 2, 1999	
First game	Miika Elomo	October 16, 1999	
First game	Alexander Volchkov	October 23, 1999	
First game	Trent Whitfield	April 17, 2000	
1,000th game played	Adam Oates	December 22, 1999	

== Draft picks ==
Washington's draft picks at the 1999 NHL entry draft held at the FleetCenter in Boston, Massachusetts.

Round	#	Player	Nationality	College/Junior/Club team (League)
1	7	Kris Beech	Canada	Calgary Hitmen (WHL)
2	29	Michal Sivek	Czech Republic	Velvana Kladno (Czech Republic)
2	31	Charlie Stephens	Canada	Guelph Storm (OHL)
2	34	Ross Lupaschuk	Canada	Prince Albert Raiders (WHL)
2	37	Nolan Yonkman	Canada	Kelowna Rockets (WHL)
5	132	Roman Tvrdon	Slovakia	Dukla Trencin Jr. (Slovakia)
6	175	Kyle Clark	United States	Harvard University (NCAA)
7	192	David Bornhammar	Sweden	AIK IF Jr. (Sweden)
8	219	Maxim Orlov	Russia	CSKA Moscow (Russia)
9	249	Igor Shadilov	Russia	Dynamo Moscow (Russia)

== See also ==
- 1999–2000 NHL season
