= Dale Rominski =

American ice hockey player (born 1975)

- Born: October 1, 1975 (age 50) Farmington Hills, Michigan, U.S.
- Height: 6 ft 2 in (188 cm)
- Weight: 200 lb (91 kg; 14 st 4 lb)
- Position: Right wing
- Shot: Right
- Played for: Tampa Bay Lightning
- NHL draft: Undrafted
- Playing career: 1999–2001

Dale Anthony Rominski (born October 1, 1975) is an American former professional ice hockey right winger. He played three games in the National Hockey League with the Tampa Bay Lightning during the 1999–2000 season, scoring one assist.

== Playing career ==
In 1994, while playing with Brother Rice High School, Rominski was named Mr. Hockey.

Rominski played four years for the University of Michigan, being named an assistant captain in his senior year. During his time in Michigan, he earned two NCAA Championship titles.

Undrafted out of Michigan, he signed with the Tampa Bay Lightning as a free agent. While playing with their IHL affiliate, the Detroit Vipers, he was recalled to the NHL. Rominski recorded his first NHL point on January 17, 2000, in a game against the Washington Capitals.

== Personal life ==
Rominski earned a master's degree in Social Work, and works as a clinical social worker with the University of Michigan.

== Career statistics ==
=== Regular season and playoffs ===
			Regular season					Playoffs
Season	Team	League	GP	G	A	Pts	PIM	GP	G	A	Pts	PIM
1995–96	University of Michigan	CCHA	35	8	7	15	37	—	—	—	—	—
1996–97	University of Michigan	CCHA	68	6	7	13	58	—	—	—	—	—
1997–98	University of Michigan	CCHA	46	10	14	24	102	—	—	—	—	—
1998–99	University of Michigan	CCHA	41	15	8	23	80	—	—	—	—	—
1999–00	Detroit Vipers	IHL	78	14	15	29	68	—	—	—	—	—
1999–00	Tampa Bay Lightning	NHL	3	0	1	1	2	—	—	—	—	—
2000–01	Detroit Vipers	IHL	65	6	6	12	52	—	—	—	—	—
NHL totals			3	0	1	1	2	—	—	—	—	—
