= Dave Duerden =

Canadian ice hockey player (born 1977)

- Born: April 11, 1977 (age 49) Oshawa, Ontario, Canada
- Height: 6 ft 2 in (188 cm)
- Weight: 200 lb (91 kg; 14 st 4 lb)
- Position: Left wing
- Shot: Left
- Played for: Florida Panthers
- NHL draft: 80th overall, 1995; Florida Panthers
- Playing career: 1997–2002

David N. Duerden (born April 11, 1977) is a Canadian former ice hockey player who played two games for the Florida Panthers of the National Hockey League during the 1999–2000 season. He was drafted 80th overall by the Panthers in the 1995 NHL entry draft, but spent most of his time in the minor leagues. In 2001, he was traded to the New York Rangers for future considerations but was assigned to their ECHL affiliate the Charlotte Checkers after never playing a game for the Rangers. After one season with the Checkers he signed with Porin Assat of the Finnish Liiga. An injury suffered in practice prior to the start of the 2002–03 season ended his career.

== Career statistics ==
			Regular season					Playoffs
Season	Team	League	GP	G	A	Pts	PIM	GP	G	A	Pts	PIM
1991–92	Ajax Pickering Raiders U18	U18 AAA	60	47	48	95	100	—	—	—	—	—
1992–93	Ajax Pickering Raiders U18	U18 AAA	60	21	48	69	45	—	—	—	—	—
1993–94	Wexford Raiders	MetJAHL	47	17	27	44	26	—	—	—	—	—
1994–95	Peterborough Petes	OHL	66	20	33	53	21	11	6	2	8	6
1995–96	Peterborough Petes	OHL	66	35	35	70	47	24	14	13	27	16
1995–96	Peterborough Petes	M-Cup	—	—	—	—	—	5	2	3	5	4
1996–97	Peterborough Petes	OHL	66	36	48	84	34	4	2	4	6	0
1997–98	Port Huron Border Cats	UHL	7	0	4	4	10	—	—	—	—	—
1997–98	Beast of New Haven	AHL	36	6	7	13	10	—	—	—	—	—
1997–98	Fort Wayne Komets	IHL	7	0	1	1	0	—	—	—	—	—
1998–99	Miami Matadors	ECHL	13	10	7	17	0	—	—	—	—	—
1998–99	Kentucky Thoroughblades	AHL	36	8	9	17	9	6	0	2	2	0
1999–00	Florida Panthers	NHL	2	0	0	0	0	—	—	—	—	—
1999–00	Louisville Panthers	AHL	74	25	38	63	6	4	0	1	1	0
2000–01	Louisville Panthers	AHL	34	9	14	23	8	—	—	—	—	—
2000–01	Hartford Wolfpack	AHL	43	16	9	25	10	5	0	2	2	0
2001–02	Charlotte Checkers	ECHL	68	31	47	78	28	5	1	2	3	4
AHL totals			223	64	77	141	43	15	0	5	5	0
NHL totals			2	0	0	0	0	—	—	—	—	—
