= Hans Jonsson (ice hockey) =

Swedish ice hockey player

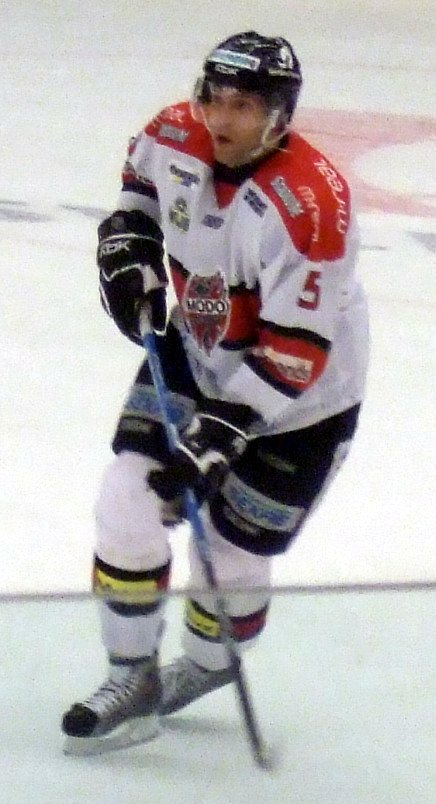
- Jonsson with Modo Hockey in 2008
- Born: August 2, 1973 (age 53) Örnsköldsvik, Sweden
- Height: 6 ft 2 in (188 cm)
- Weight: 212 lb (96 kg; 15 st 2 lb)
- Position: Defence
- Shot: Left
- Played for: Modo Hockey; Pittsburgh Penguins
- NHL draft: 286th overall, 1993; Pittsburgh Penguins
- Playing career: 1992–2011

Hans Åke Jonsson (born August 2, 1973) is a Swedish former professional ice hockey player. He played in the National Hockey League (NHL) with the Pittsburgh Penguins from 1999 to 2003. The rest of his career, which lasted from 1992 to 2011, was mainly spent with Modo Hockey in the Swedish Elitserien. Internationally, Jonsson played for the Swedish national team at three World Championships, winning a gold medal in 1998 and a bronze in 1999.

== Career ==
Jonsson was drafted by the Pittsburgh Penguins in the 1993 NHL entry draft in the 11th round, as the 286th pick overall. He made his debut for the Penguins in the 1999–00 season. After spending four seasons in Pittsburgh, Jonsson returned home to his native Sweden to play for Modo Hockey in 2003, and retired in 2011.

== Career statistics ==
=== Regular season and playoffs ===
| | | | Regular season | | | | | Playoffs |
| Season | Team | League | GP | G | A | Pts | PIM | GP | G | A | Pts | PIM |
|---|---|---|---|---|---|---|---|---|---|---|---|---|
| 1990–91 | Modo Hockey | SWE U20 | — | — | — | — | — | — | — | — | — | — |
| 1991–92 | Modo Hockey | SWE U20 | — | — | — | — | — | — | — | — | — | — |
| 1991–92 | Modo Hockey | SEL | 6 | 0 | 1 | 1 | 0 | — | — | — | — | — |
| 1991–92 | Husums IF | SWE-2 | 13 | 4 | 6 | 10 | 10 | — | — | — | — | — |
| 1992–93 | Modo Hockey | SWE U20 | 2 | 0 | 1 | 1 | 6 | — | — | — | — | — |
| 1992–93 | Modo Hockey | SEL | 40 | 2 | 2 | 4 | 24 | 3 | 0 | 2 | 2 | 4 |
| 1993–94 | Modo Hockey | SEL | 23 | 4 | 1 | 5 | 18 | 10 | 0 | 1 | 1 | 12 |
| 1994–95 | Modo Hockey | SEL | 39 | 4 | 6 | 10 | 30 | — | — | — | — | — |
| 1995–96 | Modo Hockey | SEL | 6 | 1 | 0 | 1 | 6 | 8 | 2 | 1 | 3 | 24 |
| 1996–97 | Modo Hockey | SEL | 27 | 7 | 5 | 12 | 18 | — | — | — | — | — |
| 1997–98 | Modo Hockey | SEL | 40 | 8 | 6 | 14 | 40 | — | — | — | — | — |
| 1998–99 | Modo Hockey | SEL | 41 | 3 | 4 | 7 | 40 | 13 | 2 | 4 | 6 | 22 |
| 1999–00 | Pittsburgh Penguins | NHL | 68 | 3 | 11 | 14 | 12 | 11 | 0 | 1 | 1 | 6 |
| 2000–01 | Pittsburgh Penguins | NHL | 58 | 4 | 18 | 22 | 22 | 16 | 0 | 0 | 0 | 8 |
| 2001–02 | Pittsburgh Penguins | NHL | 53 | 2 | 5 | 7 | 22 | — | — | — | — | — |
| 2002–03 | Pittsburgh Penguins | NHL | 63 | 1 | 4 | 5 | 36 | — | — | — | — | — |
| 2003–04 | Modo Hockey | SEL | 28 | 4 | 5 | 9 | 38 | 6 | 0 | 1 | 1 | 24 |
| 2004–05 | Modo Hockey | SEL | 49 | 6 | 7 | 13 | 46 | 6 | 4 | 0 | 4 | 8 |
| 2005–06 | Modo Hockey | SEL | 28 | 3 | 5 | 8 | 48 | 5 | 0 | 2 | 2 | 8 |
| 2006–07 | Modo Hockey | SEL | 44 | 3 | 10 | 13 | 86 | 19 | 1 | 2 | 3 | 26 |
| 2007–08 | Modo Hockey | SEL | 41 | 3 | 1 | 4 | 30 | 5 | 0 | 0 | 0 | 2 |
| 2008–09 | Modo Hockey | SEL | 26 | 2 | 6 | 8 | 48 | — | — | — | — | — |
| 2009–10 | Modo Hockey | SEL | 43 | 0 | 4 | 4 | 26 | — | — | — | — | — |
| 2010–11 | Modo Hockey | SEL | 44 | 2 | 5 | 7 | 32 | — | — | — | — | — |
| SEL totals | | | 525 | 52 | 68 | 120 | 534 | 83 | 10 | 14 | 24 | 142 |
| NHL totals | | | 242 | 10 | 38 | 48 | 92 | 27 | 0 | 1 | 1 | 14 |

=== International ===
Medal record

Representing Sweden

World Championships
| Gold medal – first place | 1998 Switzerland | |
| Silver medal – second place | 1999 Norway | |

World Junior Championships
| Silver medal – second place | 1993 Sweden | |

| Year | Team | Event | GP | G | A | Pts | PIM |
|---|---|---|---|---|---|---|---|
| 1991 | Sweden | EJC | 6 | 0 | — | — | — |
| 1993 | Sweden | WJC | 7 | 2 | 1 | 3 | 24 |
| 1996 | Sweden | WC | 6 | 1 | 0 | 1 | 4 |
| 1998 | Sweden | WC | 10 | 0 | 1 | 1 | 2 |
| 1999 | Sweden | WC | 10 | 0 | 0 | 0 | 16 |
| Senior totals | | | 26 | 1 | 1 | 2 | 22 |
