= Darcy Robinson =

Canadian ice hockey player

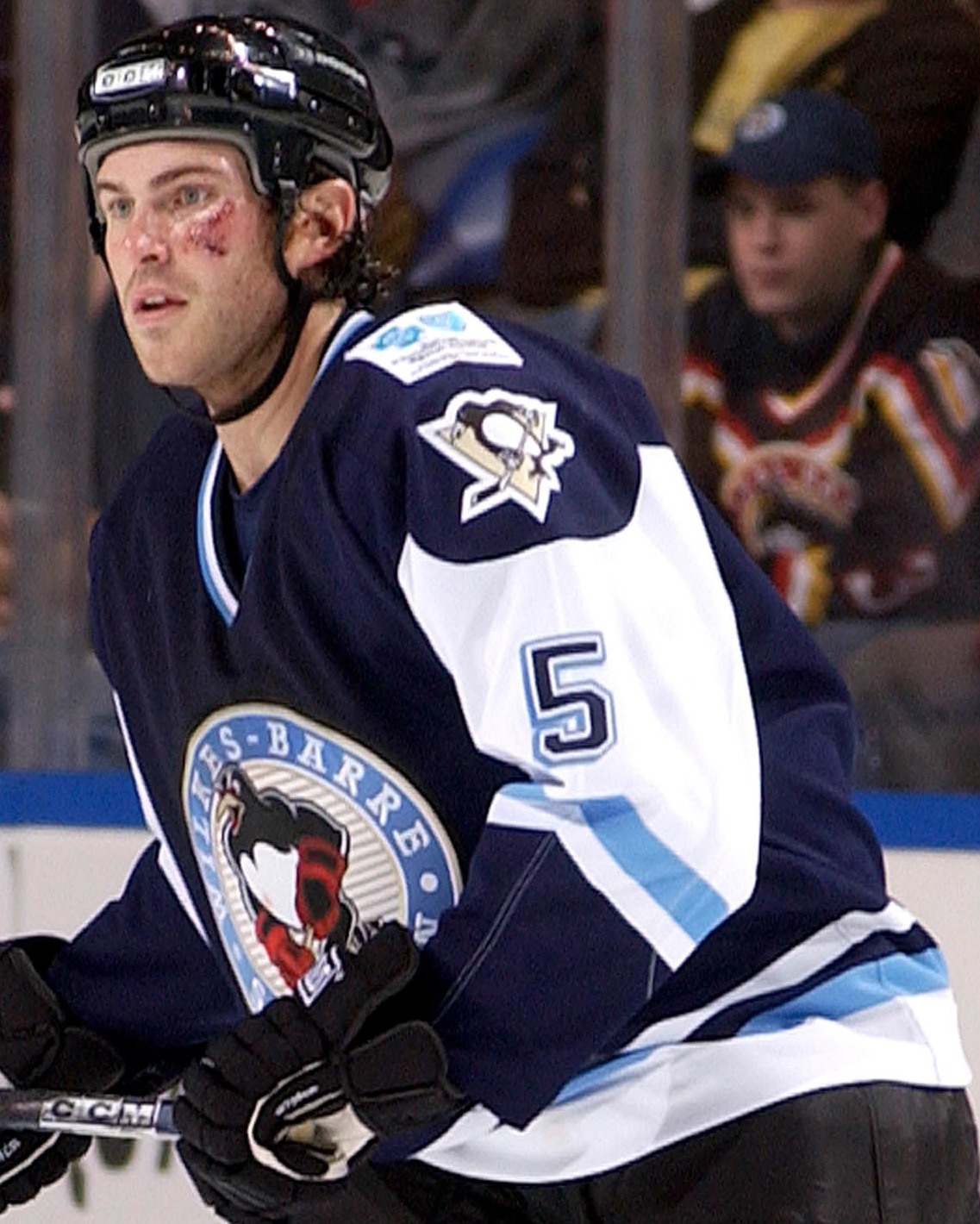
- Robinson with the Wilkes-Barre/Scranton Penguins in 2004
- Born: May 3, 1981 Kamloops, British Columbia, Canada
- Died: September 27, 2007 (aged 26) Asiago, Italy
- Height: 6 ft 3 in (191 cm)
- Weight: 239 lb (108 kg; 17 st 1 lb)
- Position: Defence
- Shot: Right
- Played for: Wilkes-Barre/Scranton Penguins; Asiago HC
- NHL draft: 233rd overall, 1999; Pittsburgh Penguins
- Playing career: 2001–2007

Darcy Robinson (May 3, 1981 – September 27, 2007) was an Italian-Canadian professional ice hockey defenseman who was a former Pittsburgh Penguins draft pick. Robinson split five seasons between the AHL and ECHL, playing for both Pittsburgh Penguins' affiliates in Wilkes-Barre and Wheeling before joining HC Asiago in 2005.

== Death ==
Robinson started his third season with Asiago HC on September 27, 2007. Less than 3 1/2 minutes into the opening game of the 2007-08 Serie A season vs Ritten-Renon, Robinson collapsed to the ice without being hit, suffering a heart attack. He was pronounced dead before he reached the hospital. The team was informed of Robinson's death with less than 8 minutes left in the game, and the game was suspended. At the time of his death, Robinson was 26 years old.

Serie A would later cancel all of the scheduled games the following night, postponed the match between Asiago and Pontebba two nights later, and all of the games scheduled on the upcoming weekend. The ANSA news agency reported Friday the local prosecutor's office has opened an official inquiry into Robinson's death.

It was later discovered that Robinson had a rare heart condition that factored into his heart attack.

== Personal ==
Robinson held dual citizenship as an Italian/Canadian at the time of his death and was looking to qualify for the Italian national hockey team.

Robinson was one of several members of the Wilkes-Barre/Scranton Penguins to be featured in the documentary Chasing the Dream.

== Career statistics ==
			Regular season					Playoffs
Season	Team	League	GP	G	A	Pts	PIM	GP	G	A	Pts	PIM
1996–97	Kamloops Jardine Blazers	Midget	58	18	42	60	188	—	—	—	—	—
1997–98	Saskatoon Blades	WHL	62	1	2	3	84	4	0	0	0	2
1998–99	Saskatoon Blades	WHL	48	3	6	9	86	—	—	—	—	—
1999–00	Saskatoon Blades	WHL	59	5	9	14	91	10	1	3	4	13
2000–01	Saskatoon Blades	WHL	41	2	6	8	80	—	—	—	—	—
2000–01	Red Deer Rebels	WHL	30	1	5	6	70	20	1	1	2	20
2001–02	Wilkes-Barre/Scranton Penguins	AHL	40	0	5	5	35	—	—	—	—	—
2001–02	Wheeling Nailers	ECHL	10	2	3	5	43	—	—	—	—	—
2002–03	Wilkes-Barre/Scranton Penguins	AHL	48	1	7	8	89	6	1	0	1	5
2002–03	Wheeling Nailers	ECHL	1	0	1	1	0	—	—	—	—	—
2003–04	Wilkes-Barre/Scranton Penguins	AHL	57	2	6	8	64	1	0	0	0	0
2004–05	Wilkes-Barre/Scranton Penguins	AHL	13	0	0	0	49	—	—	—	—	—
2004–05	Wheeling Nailers	ECHL	5	0	0	0	4	—	—	—	—	—
2005–06	Asiago HC	ITL	40	4	4	8	111	—	—	—	—	—
2006–07	Asiago HC	ITL	25	6	3	9	66	—	—	—	—	—
2007–08	Asiago HC	ITL	1	0	0	0	0	—	—	—	—	—
AHL totals			158	3	18	21	237	7	1	0	1	5

== Awards and honours ==
Award	Year
WHL/CHL
Ed Chynoweth Cup (Red Deer Rebels)	2001
Memorial Cup (Red Deer Rebels)	2001

== See also ==
- List of ice hockey players who died during their playing careers
