= Petr Míka =

Czech ice hockey player

- Born: February 12, 1979 (age 47) Prague, Czechoslovakia
- Height: 6 ft 3 in (191 cm)
- Weight: 196 lb (89 kg; 14 st 0 lb)
- Position: Right wing
- Shot: Right
- Played for: HC Slovan Ústečtí Lvi; Slovan Bratislava; HC Energie Karlovy Vary; HC Lasselsberger Plzeň; HC Oceláři Třinec; HC Vítkovice; HC České Budějovice; HC Havířov; New York Islanders; Slavia Praha
- NHL draft: 85th overall, 1997; New York Islanders
- Playing career: 1996–2010

Petr Mika (born February 12, 1979) is a Czech former professional ice hockey winger who played three games in the National Hockey League with the New York Islanders during the 1999–00 season. The rest of his career, which lasted from 1996 to 2010, was mainly spent in the Czech Extraliga. Internationally, Mika played for the Czech national junior team at the 1999 World Junior Championships.

== Career statistics ==
=== Regular season and playoffs ===
			Regular season					Playoffs
Season	Team	League	GP	G	A	Pts	PIM	GP	G	A	Pts	PIM
1995–96	Slavia Praha U20	CZE U20	26	5	12	17	—	—	—	—	—	—
1996–97	Slavia Praha U20	CZE U20	15	8	0	8	—	—	—	—	—	—
1996–97	HC Slavia Praha	CZE	20	1	2	3	6	—	—	—	—	—
1996–97	HC Berounští Medvědi	CZE-2	9	1	0	1	—	—	—	—	—	—
1997–98	Ottawa 67s	OHL	41	10	8	18	28	—	—	—	—	—
1998–99	Slavia Praha U20	CZE U20	—	—	—	—	—	—	—	—	—	—
1998–99	Slavia Praha	CZE	48	6	5	11	57	—	—	—	—	—
1999–00	New York Islanders	NHL	3	0	0	0	0	—	—	—	—	—
1999–00	Lowell Lock Monsters	AHL	50	8	9	17	20	6	0	0	0	0
2000–01	Lowell Lock Monsters	AHL	13	0	1	1	7	—	—	—	—	—
2000–01	Springfield Falcons	AHL	27	0	2	2	8	—	—	—	—	—
2001–02	Bridgeport Sound Tigers	AHL	1	0	0	0	0	—	—	—	—	—
2001–02	Slavia Praha	CZE	29	10	8	18	16	9	0	1	1	4
2002–03	Slavia Praha	CZE	8	1	0	1	4	—	—	—	—	—
2002–03	HC Havířov	CZE	15	3	2	5	10	—	—	—	—	—
2002–03	HC České Budějovice	CZE	22	8	4	12	20	4	0	0	0	6
2003–04	HC Vítkovice	CZE	44	15	12	27	44	6	3	3	6	2
2004–05	HC Vítkovice	CZE	14	4	1	5	4	—	—	—	—	—
2004–05	HC Oceláři Třinec	CZE	8	4	1	5	4	—	—	—	—	—
2004–05	HC Lasselsberger Plzeň	CZE	5	0	0	0	0	—	—	—	—	—
2004–05	HC Energie Karlovy Vary	CZE	16	0	2	2	6	—	—	—	—	—
2005–06	Slovan Bratislava	SVK	4	1	0	1	0	4	0	0	0	2
2006–07	Dresdner Eislöwen	GER-2	30	3	11	14	28	—	—	—	—	—
2006–07	VEU Feldkirch	AUT-2	3	2	2	4	6	6	2	5	7	18
2007–08	HC Slovan Ústečtí Lvi	CZE	11	1	0	1	4	—	—	—	—	—
2007–08	HC Most	CZE-2	32	9	11	20	67	—	—	—	—	—
2008–09	KLH Chomutov	CZE-2	46	14	7	21	34	11	0	0	0	4
2009–10	KLH Chomutov	CZE-2	31	2	2	4	14	—	—	—	—	—
2009–10	SK Kadan	CZE-2	2	0	1	1	0	—	—	—	—	—
CZE totals			240	53	37	90	175	19	3	4	7	12
NHL totals			3	0	0	0	0	—	—	—	—	—

=== International ===
Year	Team	Event	GP	G	A	Pts	PIM
1997	Czech Republic	EJC	6	1	1	2	2
1999	Czech Republic	WJC	6	6	1	7	2
Junior totals			12	7	2	9	4
