= 1999–2000 Los Angeles Kings season =

NHL team season

1999–2000 Los Angeles Kings
- Division: 2nd Pacific
- Conference: 5th Western
- 1999–2000 record: 39–27–12–4
- Home record: 21–13–5–2
- Road record: 18–14–7–2
- Goals for: 245
- Goals against: 228

Team information
- General manager: Dave Taylor
- Coach: Andy Murray
- Captain: Rob Blake
- Alternate captains: Mattias Norstrom; Luc Robitaille
- Arena: Staples Center
- Average attendance: 16,518
- Minor league affiliates: Long Beach Ice Dogs; Lowell Lock Monsters; Mississippi Sea Wolves; Trenton Titans

Team leaders
- Goals: Luc Robitaille (36)
- Assists: Jozef Stumpel (41)
- Points: Luc Robitaille (74)
- Penalty minutes: Ian Laperriere (185)
- Plus/minus: Jozef Stumpel (+23)
- Wins: Stephane Fiset (20)
- Goals against average: Jamie Storr (2.53)

The 1999–2000 Los Angeles Kings season was the Kings' 33rd season in the National Hockey League (NHL). It was the Kings' first season in Staples Center, which replaced The Forum as the Kings home venue. The Kings made it to the playoffs but lost in the first round to Detroit.

== Offseason ==
Head coach Larry Robinson was fired on April 19. Former NHL assistant coach Andy Murray was named his replacement on June 14.

== Regular season ==
=== Final standings ===
Pacific Division
No.	CR		GP	W	L	T	OTL	GF	GA	Pts
1	2	**Dallas Stars**	82	43	23	10	6	211	184	102
2	5	**Los Angeles Kings**	82	39	27	12	4	245	228	94
3	6	**Phoenix Coyotes**	82	39	31	8	4	232	228	90
4	8	**San Jose Sharks**	82	35	30	10	7	225	214	87
5	9	Mighty Ducks of Anaheim	82	34	33	12	3	217	227	83

Note: CR = Conference rank; GP = Games played; W = Wins; L = Losses; T = Ties; OTL = Overtime loss; GF = Goals for; GA = Goals against; PIM = Penalties in minutes; Pts = Points
Bolded teams qualified for the playoffs.

Western Conference
R		Div	GP	W	L	T	OTL	GF	GA	Pts
**1**	**p – St. Louis Blues**	**CEN**	**82**	**51**	**19**	**11**	**1**	**248**	**165**	**114**
**2**	**y – Dallas Stars**	**PAC**	**82**	**43**	**23**	**10**	**6**	**211**	**184**	**102**
**3**	**y – Colorado Avalanche**	**NW**	**82**	**42**	**28**	**11**	**1**	**233**	**201**	**96**
**4**	**Detroit Red Wings**	**CEN**	**82**	**48**	**22**	**10**	**2**	**278**	**210**	**108**
**5**	**Los Angeles Kings**	**PAC**	**82**	**39**	**27**	**12**	**4**	**245**	**228**	**94**
**6**	**Phoenix Coyotes**	**PAC**	**82**	**39**	**31**	**8**	**4**	**232**	**228**	**90**
**7**	**Edmonton Oilers**	**NW**	**82**	**32**	**26**	**16**	**8**	**226**	**212**	**88**
**8**	**San Jose Sharks**	**PAC**	**82**	**35**	**30**	**10**	**7**	**225**	**214**	**87**
8.5
9	Mighty Ducks of Anaheim	PAC	82	34	33	12	3	217	227	83
10	Vancouver Canucks	NW	82	30	29	15	8	227	237	83
11	Chicago Blackhawks	CEN	82	33	37	10	2	242	245	78
12	Calgary Flames	NW	82	31	36	10	5	211	256	77
13	Nashville Predators	CEN	82	28	40	7	7	199	240	70

Divisions: CEN – Central, PAC – Pacific, NW – Northwest

bold – Qualified for playoffs; p – Won Presidents' Trophy; y – Won division

== Schedule and results ==
=== Regular season ===
1999–2000 regular season
October: 8–3–2–0 (home: 3–1–1–0; road: 5–2–1–0)

Game	Date	Score	Opponent	Record	Recap
1	October 2, 1999	2–0	@ Nashville Predators (1999–2000)	1–0–0–0	W
2	October 4, 1999	3–2	@ St. Louis Blues (1999–2000)	2–0–0–0	W
3	October 6, 1999	2–4	@ Florida Panthers (1999–2000)	2–1–0–0	L
4	October 7, 1999	5–2	@ Tampa Bay Lightning (1999–2000)	3–1–0–0	W
5	October 9, 1999	2–2 OT	@ Washington Capitals (1999–2000)	3–1–1–0	T
6	October 15, 1999	4–1	@ Calgary Flames (1999–2000)	4–1–1–0	W
7	October 16, 1999	4–5	@ Edmonton Oilers (1999–2000)	4–2–1–0	L
8	October 20, 1999	2–2 OT	Boston Bruins (1999–2000)	4–2–2–0	T
9	October 22, 1999	3–6	Phoenix Coyotes (1999–2000)	4–3–2–0	L
10	October 24, 1999	4–3	San Jose Sharks (1999–2000)	5–3–2–0	W
11	October 26, 1999	5–2	Washington Capitals (1999–2000)	6–3–2–0	W
12	October 28, 1999	5–3	Pittsburgh Penguins (1999–2000)	7–3–2–0	W
13	October 30, 1999	3–1	@ Chicago Blackhawks (1999–2000)	8–3–2–0	W

November: 6–3–2–1 (home: 3–3–1–0; road: 3–0–1–1)

Game	Date	Score	Opponent	Record	Recap
14	November 2, 1999	5–4	@ Pittsburgh Penguins (1999–2000)	9–3–2–0	W
15	November 3, 1999	1–1 OT	@ Detroit Red Wings (1999–2000)	9–3–3–0	T
16	November 6, 1999	3–5	Philadelphia Flyers (1999–2000)	9–4–3–0	L
17	November 9, 1999	1–1 OT	Edmonton Oilers (1999–2000)	9–4–4–0	T
18	November 11, 1999	5–2	Colorado Avalanche (1999–2000)	10–4–4–0	W
19	November 14, 1999	3–2	@ Phoenix Coyotes (1999–2000)	11–4–4–0	W
20	November 16, 1999	3–2	Chicago Blackhawks (1999–2000)	12–4–4–0	W
21	November 18, 1999	2–3	Phoenix Coyotes (1999–2000)	12–5–4–0	L
22	November 20, 1999	3–5	Montreal Canadiens (1999–2000)	12–6–4–0	L
23	November 23, 1999	6–2	@ Colorado Avalanche (1999–2000)	13–6–4–0	W
24	November 24, 1999	2–3 OT	@ Dallas Stars (1999–2000)	13–6–4–1	OTL
25	November 27, 1999	4–1	San Jose Sharks (1999–2000)	14–6–4–1	W

December: 3–6–2–1 (home: 2–1–1–1; road: 1–5–1–0)

Game	Date	Score	Opponent	Record	Recap
26	December 3, 1999	1–1 OT	@ Mighty Ducks of Anaheim (1999–2000)	14–6–5–1	T
27	December 4, 1999	3–3 OT	Tampa Bay Lightning (1999–2000)	14–6–6–1	T
28	December 8, 1999	4–0	Atlanta Thrashers (1999–2000)	15–6–6–1	W
29	December 10, 1999	1–3	@ Detroit Red Wings (1999–2000)	15–7–6–1	L
30	December 11, 1999	4–2	@ Montreal Canadiens (1999–2000)	16–7–6–1	W
31	December 14, 1999	1–7	@ New Jersey Devils (1999–2000)	16–8–6–1	L
32	December 15, 1999	3–8	@ New York Rangers (1999–2000)	16–9–6–1	L
33	December 18, 1999	4–8	Chicago Blackhawks (1999–2000)	16–10–6–1	L
34	December 22, 1999	1–2	@ San Jose Sharks (1999–2000)	16–11–6–1	L
35	December 26, 1999	2–3 OT	Phoenix Coyotes (1999–2000)	16–11–6–2	OTL
36	December 29, 1999	2–4	@ Colorado Avalanche (1999–2000)	16–12–6–2	L
37	December 30, 1999	8–2	Edmonton Oilers (1999–2000)	17–12–6–2	W

January: 5–6–1–1 (home: 4–3–0–0; road: 1–3–1–1)

Game	Date	Score	Opponent	Record	Recap
38	January 3, 2000	1–4	@ Dallas Stars (1999–2000)	17–13–6–2	L
39	January 4, 2000	2–2 OT	@ St. Louis Blues (1999–2000)	17–13–7–2	T
40	January 6, 2000	4–2	Florida Panthers (1999–2000)	18–13–7–2	W
41	January 11, 2000	3–4	Ottawa Senators (1999–2000)	18–14–7–2	L
42	January 13, 2000	2–3	St. Louis Blues (1999–2000)	18–15–7–2	L
43	January 15, 2000	2–3 OT	@ San Jose Sharks (1999–2000)	18–15–7–3	OTL
44	January 18, 2000	5–3	Buffalo Sabres (1999–2000)	19–15–7–3	W
45	January 20, 2000	2–5	Dallas Stars (1999–2000)	19–16–7–3	L
46	January 23, 2000	3–2	Colorado Avalanche (1999–2000)	20–16–7–3	W
47	January 26, 2000	1–3	@ Dallas Stars (1999–2000)	20–17–7–3	L
48	January 27, 2000	6–2	@ Nashville Predators (1999–2000)	21–17–7–3	W
49	January 29, 2000	2–3	@ Toronto Maple Leafs (1999–2000)	21–18–7–3	L
50	January 31, 2000	5–2	New York Islanders (1999–2000)	22–18–7–3	W

February: 8–4–1–0 (home: 3–1–1–0; road: 5–3–0–0)

Game	Date	Score	Opponent	Record	Recap
51	February 3, 2000	6–3	Detroit Red Wings (1999–2000)	23–18–7–3	W
52	February 8, 2000	3–5	Mighty Ducks of Anaheim (1999–2000)	23–19–7–3	L
53	February 9, 2000	5–2	@ Phoenix Coyotes (1999–2000)	24–19–7–3	W
54	February 11, 2000	3–2	Dallas Stars (1999–2000)	25–19–7–3	W
55	February 14, 2000	4–3 OT	Calgary Flames (1999–2000)	26–19–7–3	W
56	February 16, 2000	4–1	@ Chicago Blackhawks (1999–2000)	27–19–7–3	W
57	February 18, 2000	3–2	@ Detroit Red Wings (1999–2000)	28–19–7–3	W
58	February 19, 2000	1–4	@ Buffalo Sabres (1999–2000)	28–20–7–3	L
59	February 21, 2000	3–6	@ Edmonton Oilers (1999–2000)	28–21–7–3	L
60	February 23, 2000	7–2	@ Calgary Flames (1999–2000)	29–21–7–3	W
61	February 25, 2000	5–2	@ Vancouver Canucks (1999–2000)	30–21–7–3	W
62	February 26, 2000	3–6	@ San Jose Sharks (1999–2000)	30–22–7–3	L
63	February 29, 2000	1–1 OT	Vancouver Canucks (1999–2000)	30–22–8–3	T

March: 6–4–3–1 (home: 4–4–1–1; road: 2–0–2–0)

Game	Date	Score	Opponent	Record	Recap
64	March 2, 2000	2–5	Carolina Hurricanes (1999–2000)	30–23–8–3	L
65	March 4, 2000	3–2 OT	Nashville Predators (1999–2000)	31–23–8–3	W
66	March 7, 2000	1–3	Detroit Red Wings (1999–2000)	31–24–8–3	L
67	March 9, 2000	3–1	New York Rangers (1999–2000)	32–24–8–3	W
68	March 11, 2000	3–1	Calgary Flames (1999–2000)	33–24–8–3	W
69	March 13, 2000	3–2 OT	Vancouver Canucks (1999–2000)	34–24–8–3	W
70	March 15, 2000	2–2 OT	@ Mighty Ducks of Anaheim (1999–2000)	34–24–9–3	T
71	March 17, 2000	0–4	St. Louis Blues (1999–2000)	34–25–9–3	L
72	March 19, 2000	1–2 OT	Nashville Predators (1999–2000)	34–25–9–4	OTL
73	March 21, 2000	2–5	Mighty Ducks of Anaheim (1999–2000)	34–26–9–4	L
74	March 23, 2000	3–2 OT	@ Philadelphia Flyers (1999–2000)	35–26–9–4	W
75	March 25, 2000	4–4 OT	@ Boston Bruins (1999–2000)	35–26–10–4	T
76	March 26, 2000	4–1	@ Atlanta Thrashers (1999–2000)	36–26–10–4	W
77	March 29, 2000	1–1 OT	San Jose Sharks (1999–2000)	36–26–11–4	T

April: 3–1–1–0 (home: 2–0–0–0; road: 1–1–1–0)

Game	Date	Score	Opponent	Record	Recap
78	April 1, 2000	2–1	Mighty Ducks of Anaheim (1999–2000)	37–26–11–4	W
79	April 3, 2000	1–2	@ Phoenix Coyotes (1999–2000)	37–27–11–4	L
80	April 5, 2000	1–1 OT	@ Vancouver Canucks (1999–2000)	37–27–12–4	T
81	April 7, 2000	3–2	Dallas Stars (1999–2000)	38–27–12–4	W
82	April 9, 2000	4–3 OT	@ Mighty Ducks of Anaheim (1999–2000)	39–27–12–4	W

Legend: W Win (2 points) L Loss (0 points) T Tie (1 point) OTL Overtime loss (1 point)

=== Playoffs ===
2000 Stanley Cup playoffs
Western Conference Quarterfinals vs. (4) Detroit Red Wings — Red Wings win 4–0

Game	Date	Score	Opponent	Series	Recap
1	April 13, 2000	0–2	@ Detroit Red Wings	Red Wings lead 1–0	L
2	April 15, 2000	5–8	@ Detroit Red Wings	Red Wings lead 2–0	L
3	April 17, 2000	1–2	Detroit Red Wings	Red Wings lead 3–0	L
4	April 19, 2000	0–3	Detroit Red Wings	Red Wings win 4–0	L

Legend: W Win L Loss

== Player statistics ==
=== Scoring ===
- Position abbreviations: C = Center; D = Defense; G = Goaltender; LW = Left wing; RW = Right wing
- † = Joined team via a transaction (e.g., trade, waivers, signing) during the season. Stats reflect time with the Kings only.
- ‡ = Left team via a transaction (e.g., trade, waivers, release) during the season. Stats reflect time with the Kings only.

No.	Player	Pos	Regular season						Playoffs					
No.	Player	Pos	GP	G	A	Pts	+/-	PIM	GP	G	A	Pts	+/-	PIM
20	Luc Robitaille	LW	71	36	38	74	11	68	4	2	2	4	−1	6
33	Zigmund Palffy	RW	64	27	39	66	18	32	4	2	0	2	0	0
27	Glen Murray	RW	78	29	33	62	13	60	4	0	0	0	−3	2
15	Jozef Stumpel	C	57	17	41	58	23	10	4	0	4	4	0	8
4	Rob Blake	D	77	18	39	57	10	112	4	0	2	2	1	4
21	Bryan Smolinski	C	79	20	36	56	2	48	4	0	0	0	−1	2
10	Donald Audette‡	RW	49	12	20	32	6	45	—	—	—	—	—	—
3	Garry Galley	D	70	9	21	30	9	52	4	0	0	0	−2	0
23	Craig Johnson	LW	76	9	14	23	−10	28	4	1	0	1	0	2
11	Jason Blake	C	64	5	18	23	4	26	3	0	0	0	0	0
22	Ian Laperriere	RW	79	9	13	22	−14	185	4	0	0	0	0	2
12	Marko Tuomainen	RW	63	9	8	17	−12	80	1	0	0	0	0	0
8	Jere Karalahti	D	48	6	10	16	3	18	4	0	1	1	−3	2
5	Aki Berg	D	70	3	13	16	−1	45	2	0	0	0	0	2
6	Sean O'Donnell	D	80	2	12	14	4	114	4	1	0	1	0	4
14	Mattias Norstrom	D	82	1	13	14	22	66	4	0	0	0	1	6
9	Vladimir Tsyplakov‡	LW	29	6	7	13	6	4	—	—	—	—	—	—
19	Len Barrie‡	C	46	5	8	13	5	56	—	—	—	—	—	—
29	Brad Chartrand	C	50	6	6	12	4	17	4	0	0	0	−1	6
19 (Note: Corkum wore number 17 until Emerson was acquired.)	Bob Corkum†	C	45	5	6	11	0	14	4	0	0	0	−1	0
44	Jaroslav Modry	D	26	5	4	9	−2	18	2	0	0	0	0	2
42	Dan Bylsma	RW	64	3	6	9	−2	55	3	0	0	0	−1	0
2	Frantisek Kaberle‡	D	37	0	9	9	3	4	—	—	—	—	—	—
7	Steve McKenna	LW	46	0	5	5	3	125	—	—	—	—	—	—
9	Kelly Buchberger†	RW	13	2	1	3	−2	13	4	0	0	0	−1	4
17	Nelson Emerson†	RW	5	1	1	2	1	0	1	0	0	0	0	0
35	Stephane Fiset	G	47	0	2	2		4	4	0	0	0		0
37	Jason Podollan	RW	1	0	1	1	0	2	—	—	—	—	—	—
1	Jamie Storr	G	42	0	1	1		4	1	0	0	0		0
43	Philippe Boucher	D	1	0	0	0	0	0	—	—	—	—	—	—
34	Marcel Cousineau	G	5	0	0	0		0	—	—	—	—	—	—
28	Bill Huard‡	LW	1	0	0	0	0	2	—	—	—	—	—	—
54	Jan Nemecek	D	1	0	0	0	0	0	—	—	—	—	—	—
28	Steve Reinprecht†	C	1	0	0	0	0	2	—	—	—	—	—	—
55	Pavel Rosa	RW	3	0	0	0	−1	0	—	—	—	—	—	—

=== Goaltending ===
No.	Player	Regular season										Playoffs								
No.	Player	GP	W	L	T	SA	GA	GAA	SV%	SO	TOI	GP	W	L	SA	GA	GAA	SV%	SO	TOI
35	Stephane Fiset	47	20	15	7	1208	119	2.75	.901	1	2592	4	0	3	98	10	3.00	.898	0	200
1	Jamie Storr	42	18	15	5	1008	93	2.53	.908	1	2206	1	0	1	25	2	3.33	.920	0	36
34	Marcel Cousineau	5	1	1	0	64	6	2.11	.906	0	171	—	—	—	—	—	—	—	—	—

== Awards and records ==
=== Awards ===
Type	Award/honor	Recipient	Ref
League (annual)	NHL Second All-Star Team	Rob Blake (Defense)	
League (in-season)	NHL All-Star Game selection	Rob Blake (Note: Blake was voted to the starting lineup.)	
League (in-season)	NHL Player of the Week	Luc Robitaille (October 11)	
League (in-season)	NHL Player of the Week	Bryan Smolinski (November 1)	
Team	Best Newcomer	Zigmund Palffy	
Team	Bill Libby Memorial Award	Rob Blake	
Team	Defensive Player	Mattias Norstrom	
Team	Jim Fox Community Service	Rob Blake	
Team	Leading Scorer	Luc Robitaille	
Team	Most Inspirational	Garry Galley	
Team	Most Popular Player	Ian Laperriere	
Team	Outstanding Defenseman	Rob Blake	
Team	Unsung Hero	Mattias Norstrom	

=== Milestones ===
Milestone	Player	Date	Ref
First game	Brad Chartrand	October 2, 1999	
First game	Frantisek Kaberle	October 2, 1999	
First game	Jere Karalahti	December 11, 1999	
First game	Steven Reinprecht	April 5, 2000	
1,000th game played	Luc Robitaille	January 4, 2000	

== Transactions ==
The Kings were involved in the following transactions during the 1999–2000 season.

=== Trades ===
June 19, 1999	To Los Angeles Kings Žigmund Pálffy; Bryan Smolinski; Marcel Cousineau; 4th round pick in 1999 - Daniel Johansson	To New York Islanders Olli Jokinen; Josh Green; Mathieu Biron; 1st round pick in 1999 - Taylor Pyatt
January 23, 2000	To Los Angeles Kings 8th round pick in 2000 - Dan Welch; 6th round pick in 2001 - Art Femenella	To Buffalo Sabres Vladimir Tsyplakov; 8th round pick in 2001 - Marek Dubec
January 25, 2000	To Los Angeles Kings Future considerations	To Atlanta Thrashers Bill Huard
February 18, 2000	To Los Angeles Kings Allan Egeland	To Calgary Flames Future considerations
February 23, 2000	To Los Angeles Kings Craig Charron	To Toronto Maple Leafs Don MacLean
March 13, 2000	To Los Angeles Kings Kelly Buchberger; Nelson Emerson	To Atlanta Thrashers Donald Audette; František Kaberle
May 1, 2000	To Los Angeles Kings Steve Passmore	To Chicago Blackhawks 4th round pick in 2000 - Olli Malmivaara

=== Free agent signings ===
June 20, 1999	From HIFK (SM-I) Marko Tuomainen (1 year, $500,000)
July 19, 1999	From Edmonton Oilers Bill Huard
July 21, 1999	From St. John's Maple Leafs (AHL) Brad Chartrand
July 21, 1999	From Frankfurt Lions (DEL) Len Barrie (1 year, $350,000)
July 21, 1999	From EC Villacher SV (ALP) Mike O'Neill
July 30, 1999	From Manitoba Moose (IHL) Scott Thomas
August 26, 1999	From Philadelphia Flyers David MacIsaac
December 26, 1999	From Phoenix Coyotes Bob Corkum (2 years, $1.65 million)
February 18, 2000	From Calgary Hitmen (WHL) Jerred Smithson
February 18, 2000	From St. Louis Blues Travis Scott
March 31, 2000	From University of Wisconsin-Madison (WCHA) Steven Reinprecht

=== Free agents lost ===
July 15, 1999	To Detroit Red Wings Manny Legace
July 21, 1999	To Florida Panthers Ryan Bach
August 2, 1999	To Atlanta Thrashers Ray Ferraro (2 years, $2 million)
August 4, 1999	To Vancouver Canucks Doug Bodger (1 year, $700,000)
November 4, 1999	To Anchorage Aces (WCHL) Ruslan Batyrshin
January 31, 2000	To HC Ambrì-Piotta (NLA) Dave Babych

=== Expansion draft ===
June 25, 1999	To Atlanta Thrashers Matt Johnson

=== Waivers ===
September 27, 1999	From Nashville Predators Rich Brennan
March 10, 2000	To Florida Panthers Len Barrie

== Draft picks ==
Los Angeles's draft picks at the 1999 NHL entry draft held at the FleetCenter in Boston, Massachusetts.

Round	#	Player	Nationality	College/Junior/Club team (League)
2	43	Andrei Shefer	Russia	Severstal Cherepovets (Russia)
3	74	Jason Crain	United States	Ohio State University (NCAA)
3	76	Frantisek Kaberle	Czech Republic	MODO (Sweden)
3	92	Cory Campbell	Canada	Belleville Bulls (OHL)
4	104	Brian McGrattan	Canada	Sudbury Wolves (OHL)
4	125	Daniel Johansson	Sweden	MODO (Sweden)
5	133	Jean-Francois Nogues	Canada	Victoriaville Tigres (QMJHL)
7	193	Kevin Baker	Canada	Belleville Bulls (OHL)
8	222	George Parros	United States	Chicago Freeze (NAHL)
9	250	Noah Clarke	United States	Des Moines Buccaneers (USHL)

== See also ==
- 1999–2000 NHL season
