= 1999–2000 Toronto Maple Leafs season =

NHL hockey team season

1999–2000 Toronto Maple Leafs
- Northeast Division champions
- Division: 1st Northeast
- Conference: 3rd Eastern
- 1999–2000 record: 45–27–7–3
- Home record: 24–12–5–0
- Road record: 21–15–2–3
- Goals for: 246
- Goals against: 222

Team information
- General manager: Ken Dryden
- Coach: Pat Quinn
- Captain: Mats Sundin
- Alternate captains: Steve Thomas; Dmitri Yushkevich
- Arena: Air Canada Centre
- Average attendance: 19,158
- Minor league affiliates: St. John's Maple Leafs; Louisiana IceGators

Team leaders
- Goals: Mats Sundin (32)
- Assists: Mats Sundin (41)
- Points: Mats Sundin (73)
- Penalty minutes: Tie Domi (198)
- Plus/minus: Mats Sundin (+16)
- Wins: Curtis Joseph (36)
- Goals against average: Curtis Joseph (2.49)

The 1999–2000 Toronto Maple Leafs season saw the team earn their first 100-point regular season, finishing in first place for the first time since the 1962–63 season and qualifying for the playoffs for the second consecutive year. It was also the Maple Leafs' first full season at the Air Canada Centre, as well as former captain Wendel Clark's last season in the NHL.

== Offseason ==
- On July 22, 1999, Syl Apps III, the grandson of former Maple Leafs captain Syl Apps, was signed as a free agent by Toronto.

== Regular season ==
The Maple Leafs had their second consecutive 45-win season and broke the 1992–93 franchise record for most points accumulated in a season. Mats Sundin averaged a point per game, scoring 32 goals and picking up 41 assists for 73 points in 73 games. Jonas Hoglund had a career year, finishing third on the team in points with 56 (29 goals and 27 assists). Goaltender Curtis Joseph set a Maple Leafs record for wins in a season by a goaltender, with 36. The Leafs put Steve Sullivan on waivers and on October 23, 1999, he was picked up by the Chicago Blackhawks. In early 2000, Wendel Clark returned to the Leafs for the third time and had a two-goal game on February 1 in a 5–3 Maple Leafs win at Tampa Bay. In March, the Leafs traded Mike Johnson to Tampa Bay in exchange for Darcy Tucker.

The Leafs got off to a red-hot start to the season, winning 10 of their first 14 games with four shutouts. The team suffered a setback on December 4, 1999, in a home game against the Pittsburgh Penguins. Forward Yanic Perreault was coming around the Pittsburgh net with the puck when Penguins goaltender Tom Barrasso slashed Perreault with his goalie stick. Perreault suffered a broken arm and missed 23 games; Barrasso received a four-game suspension for his actions. Another setback occurred on March 11 at Ottawa, when Senators forward Marian Hossa was attempting to clear the puck out of the centre-ice zone. Hossa swung his stick in a golf-swing motion and caught Toronto defenseman Bryan Berard in his right eye. Berard had to leave the game due to the injury and Hossa was assessed with a double minor for high-sticking. It was the last NHL game Berard would play for nearly a year-and-a-half. Additionally, Sergei Berezin, a 37-goal scorer in 1998–99, missed 21 games for the team, but nonetheless finished with a solid 26 goals for Toronto. Despite these hindrances, the Leafs battled on, defeating four solid teams between March 16 and April 1 (Detroit on March 16, New Jersey on March 25, St. Louis on March 29 and Washington on April 1). The Leafs finished third in the Eastern Conference and first in the Northeast Division—the first time the Leafs had won a division title since 1938. Mats Sundin led all skaters in overtime goals scored, with four.

=== All-Star Game ===
The 50th National Hockey League All-Star Game was part of the 1999–2000 NHL season, and took place in Toronto's Air Canada Centre on February 6, 2000.

The all-star week festivities saw the Canadian Hockey League Top Prospects Game played on February 2, and an exhibition game between the Canadian and American women's national teams on February 3. The Heroes of Hockey game and the Skills Competition were held on February 5. It is to note that the opening face-off for the Heroes of Hockey game were Ted Lindsay and Fleming Mackell, two players who played in the 1st National Hockey League All-Star Game.

The week also was a good sendoff for Wayne Gretzky, who had retired the previous season. His #99 was raised to the rafters, despite him never playing for the hometown Maple Leafs, as a show of his number's league-wide retirement. Gretzky also made it clear that he would not partake in any old-timer or Heroes of Hockey game unless it was held in Edmonton, a statement that was realized with the 2003 Heritage Classic three years later.

=== Season standings ===
Northeast Division
No.	CR		GP	W	L	T	OTL	GF	GA	Pts
1	3	**Toronto Maple Leafs**	82	45	27	7	3	246	222	100
2	6	**Ottawa Senators**	82	41	28	11	2	244	210	95
3	8	**Buffalo Sabres**	82	35	32	11	4	213	204	85
4	10	Montreal Canadiens	82	35	34	9	4	196	194	83
5	11	Boston Bruins	82	24	33	19	6	210	248	73

Note: CR = Conference rank; GP = Games played; W = Wins; L = Losses; T = Ties; GF = Goals for; GA = Goals against; Pts = Points
Bolded teams qualified for the playoffs.

Eastern Conference
R		Div	GP	W	L	T	OTL	GF	GA	Pts
**1**	**z – Philadelphia Flyers**	**AT**	**82**	**45**	**22**	**12**	**3**	**237**	**179**	105
**2**	**y – Washington Capitals**	**SE**	**82**	**44**	**24**	**12**	**2**	**227**	**194**	102
**3**	**y – Toronto Maple Leafs**	**NE**	**82**	**45**	**27**	**7**	**3**	**246**	**222**	100
**4**	**New Jersey Devils**	**AT**	**82**	**45**	**24**	**8**	**5**	**251**	**203**	103
**5**	**Florida Panthers**	**SE**	**82**	**43**	**27**	**6**	**6**	**244**	**209**	98
**6**	**Ottawa Senators**	**NE**	**82**	**41**	**28**	**11**	**2**	**244**	**210**	95
**7**	**Pittsburgh Penguins**	**AT**	**82**	**37**	**31**	**8**	**6**	**241**	**236**	88
**8**	**Buffalo Sabres**	**NE**	**82**	**35**	**32**	**11**	**4**	**213**	**204**	85
8.5
9	Carolina Hurricanes	SE	82	37	35	10	0	217	216	84
10	Montreal Canadiens	NE	82	35	34	9	4	196	194	83
11	New York Rangers	AT	82	29	38	12	3	218	246	73
12	Boston Bruins	NE	82	24	33	19	6	210	248	73
13	New York Islanders	AT	82	24	48	9	1	194	275	58
14	Tampa Bay Lightning	SE	82	19	47	9	7	204	310	54
15	Atlanta Thrashers	SE	82	14	57	7	4	170	313	39

Divisions: AT – Atlantic, NE – Northeast, SE – Southeast

bold – Qualified for playoffs; z – Won conference; y – Won division

== Playoffs ==
In the playoffs, they defeated the Ottawa Senators in 6 games in the Eastern Conference quarterfinals before losing to the eventual Stanley Cup champion New Jersey Devils in 6 games. This was the last time the Leafs lost a playoff series to an eventual champion until they lost to the Florida Panthers in 2025.

== Schedule and results ==
=== Regular season ===
1999–2000 regular season
October: 9–3–1–0 (home: 7–1–1–0; road: 2–2–0–0)

Game	Date	Score	Opponent	Record	Recap
1	October 2, 1999	4–1	@ Montreal Canadiens (1999–2000)	1–0–0–0	W
2	October 4, 1999	4–0	Boston Bruins (1999–2000)	2–0–0–0	W
3	October 6, 1999	2–1	Colorado Avalanche (1999–2000)	3–0–0–0	W
4	October 9, 1999	3–4	@ Ottawa Senators (1999–2000)	3–1–0–0	L
5	October 11, 1999	2–4	Nashville Predators (1999–2000)	3–2–0–0	L
6	October 13, 1999	3–2	Florida Panthers (1999–2000)	4–2–0–0	W
7	October 15, 1999	2–1	@ Chicago Blackhawks (1999–2000)	5–2–0–0	W
8	October 16, 1999	2–4	@ St. Louis Blues (1999–2000)	5–3–0–0	L
9	October 20, 1999	3–3 OT	Carolina Hurricanes (1999–2000)	5–3–1–0	T
10	October 23, 1999	3–2	Montreal Canadiens (1999–2000)	6–3–1–0	W
11	October 25, 1999	4–0	Dallas Stars (1999–2000)	7–3–1–0	W
12	October 27, 1999	4–0	Atlanta Thrashers (1999–2000)	8–3–1–0	W
13	October 30, 1999	2–1	Calgary Flames (1999–2000)	9–3–1–0	W

November: 5–4–2–2 (home: 4–2–1–0; road: 1–2–1–2)

Game	Date	Score	Opponent	Record	Recap
14	November 3, 1999	6–0	@ Carolina Hurricanes (1999–2000)	10–3–1–0	W
15	November 5, 1999	3–5	@ Washington Capitals (1999–2000)	10–4–1–0	L
16	November 6, 1999	3–3 OT	@ New Jersey Devils (1999–2000)	10–4–2–0	T
17	November 9, 1999	0–2	Mighty Ducks of Anaheim (1999–2000)	10–5–2–0	L
18	November 11, 1999	3–4 OT	@ Boston Bruins (1999–2000)	10–5–2–1	OTL
19	November 13, 1999	1–1 OT	Detroit Red Wings (1999–2000)	10–5–3–1	T
20	November 15, 1999	4–2	San Jose Sharks (1999–2000)	11–5–3–1	W
21	November 17, 1999	2–3	St. Louis Blues (1999–2000)	11–6–3–1	L
22	November 20, 1999 †	4–3 OT	New York Rangers (1999–2000)	12–6–3–1	W
23	November 23, 1999	1–3	@ Pittsburgh Penguins (1999–2000)	12–7–3–1	L
24	November 26, 1999	2–3 OT	@ Philadelphia Flyers (1999–2000)	12–7–3–2	OTL
25	November 27, 1999	5–2	Edmonton Oilers (1999–2000)	13–7–3–2	W
26	November 29, 1999	3–1	Washington Capitals (1999–2000)	14–7–3–2	W

December: 9–2–1–0 (home: 6–1–0–0; road: 3–1–1–0)

Game	Date	Score	Opponent	Record	Recap
27	December 2, 1999	2–2 OT	@ Carolina Hurricanes (1999–2000)	14–7–4–2	T
28	December 4, 1999	3–2 OT	Pittsburgh Penguins (1999–2000)	15–7–4–2	W
29	December 6, 1999	3–2 OT	Buffalo Sabres (1999–2000)	16–7–4–2	W
30	December 9, 1999	2–4	@ Philadelphia Flyers (1999–2000)	16–8–4–2	L
31	December 11, 1999	6–4	Philadelphia Flyers (1999–2000)	17–8–4–2	W
32	December 13, 1999	1–3	Ottawa Senators (1999–2000)	17–9–4–2	L
33	December 15, 1999	5–1	New York Islanders (1999–2000)	18–9–4–2	W
34	December 18, 1999	2–1	Montreal Canadiens (1999–2000)	19–9–4–2	W
35	December 20, 1999	6–4	@ Florida Panthers (1999–2000)	20–9–4–2	W
36	December 21, 1999	4–2	@ Tampa Bay Lightning (1999–2000)	21–9–4–2	W
37	December 23, 1999	4–1	New Jersey Devils (1999–2000)	22–9–4–2	W
38	December 29, 1999	2–1	@ New York Islanders (1999–2000)	23–9–4–2	W

January: 6–5–2–1 (home: 2–1–2–0; road: 4–4–0–1)

Game	Date	Score	Opponent	Record	Recap
39	January 1, 2000	1–8	@ Buffalo Sabres (1999–2000)	23–10–4–2	L
40	January 3, 2000	6–2	Buffalo Sabres (1999–2000)	24–10–4–2	W
41	January 5, 2000	2–3 OT	@ New York Rangers (1999–2000)	24–10–4–3	OTL
42	January 7, 2000	2–5	@ Pittsburgh Penguins (1999–2000)	24–11–4–3	L
43	January 8, 2000	3–5	New York Rangers (1999–2000)	24–12–4–3	L
44	January 11, 2000	3–2	@ Boston Bruins (1999–2000)	25–12–4–3	W
45	January 14, 2000	3–2 OT	@ Edmonton Oilers (1999–2000)	26–12–4–3	W
46	January 15, 2000	0–4	@ Calgary Flames (1999–2000)	26–13–4–3	L
47	January 17, 2000	5–4 OT	@ Vancouver Canucks (1999–2000)	27–13–4–3	W
48	January 22, 2000	5–5 OT	Washington Capitals (1999–2000)	27–13–5–3	T
49	January 24, 2000	3–3 OT	Ottawa Senators (1999–2000)	27–13–6–3	T
50	January 26, 2000	2–4	@ Detroit Red Wings (1999–2000)	27–14–6–3	L
51	January 27, 2000	4–3	@ New York Rangers (1999–2000)	28–14–6–3	W
52	January 29, 2000	3–2	Los Angeles Kings (1999–2000)	29–14–6–3	W

February: 5–5–1–0 (home: 2–3–1–0; road: 3–2–0–0)

Game	Date	Score	Opponent	Record	Recap
53	February 1, 2000	5–3	@ Tampa Bay Lightning (1999–2000)	30–14–6–3	W
54	February 3, 2000	2–4	@ Boston Bruins (1999–2000)	30–15–6–3	L
55	February 9, 2000	2–4	Philadelphia Flyers (1999–2000)	30–16–6–3	L
56	February 12, 2000	1–4	Vancouver Canucks (1999–2000)	30–17–6–3	L
57	February 14, 2000	2–5	Carolina Hurricanes (1999–2000)	30–18–6–3	L
58	February 16, 2000	3–3 OT	Boston Bruins (1999–2000)	30–18–7–3	T
59	February 19, 2000	1–2	@ Montreal Canadiens (1999–2000)	30–19–7–3	L
60	February 23, 2000	5–3	Phoenix Coyotes (1999–2000)	31–19–7–3	W
61	February 25, 2000	3–1	@ New Jersey Devils (1999–2000)	32–19–7–3	W
62	February 26, 2000	5–2	Buffalo Sabres (1999–2000)	33–19–7–3	W
63	February 29, 2000	4–0	@ Atlanta Thrashers (1999–2000)	34–19–7–3	W

March: 8–6–0–0 (home: 2–3–0–0; road: 6–3–0–0)

Game	Date	Score	Opponent	Record	Recap
64	March 1, 2000	1–3	@ Florida Panthers (1999–2000)	34–20–7–3	L
65	March 4, 2000	4–3	Montreal Canadiens (1999–2000)	35–20–7–3	W
66	March 6, 2000	6–5 OT	@ Vancouver Canucks (1999–2000)	36–20–7–3	W
67	March 7, 2000	2–0	@ Edmonton Oilers (1999–2000)	37–20–7–3	W
68	March 9, 2000	6–2	@ Calgary Flames (1999–2000)	38–20–7–3	W
69	March 11, 2000	4–2	@ Ottawa Senators (1999–2000)	39–20–7–3	W
70	March 15, 2000	2–5	Chicago Blackhawks (1999–2000)	39–21–7–3	L
71	March 16, 2000	4–3 OT	@ Detroit Red Wings (1999–2000)	40–21–7–3	W
72	March 18, 2000	1–4	Atlanta Thrashers (1999–2000)	40–22–7–3	L
73	March 22, 2000	2–5	New York Islanders (1999–2000)	40–23–7–3	L
74	March 23, 2000	2–3	@ Ottawa Senators (1999–2000)	40–24–7–3	L
75	March 25, 2000	5–3	New Jersey Devils (1999–2000)	41–24–7–3	W
76	March 29, 2000	3–2	@ St. Louis Blues (1999–2000)	42–24–7–3	W
77	March 30, 2000	0–4	@ Chicago Blackhawks (1999–2000)	42–25–7–3	L

April: 3–2–0–0 (home: 1–1–0–0; road: 2–1–0–0)

Game	Date	Score	Opponent	Record	Recap
78	April 1, 2000	4–3	@ Washington Capitals (1999–2000)	43–25–7–3	W
79	April 3, 2000	2–3	@ Buffalo Sabres (1999–2000)	43–26–7–3	L
80	April 5, 2000	2–4	Pittsburgh Penguins (1999–2000)	43–27–7–3	L
81	April 7, 2000	2–1	@ New York Islanders (1999–2000)	44–27–7–3	W
82	April 8, 2000	4–2	Tampa Bay Lightning (1999–2000)	45–27–7–3	W

Legend: W Win (2 points) L Loss (0 points) T Tie (1 point) OTL Overtime loss (1 point)

- † Hockey Hall of Fame Game

=== Playoffs ===
2000 Stanley Cup playoffs
Eastern Conference Quarterfinals vs. (6) Ottawa Senators – Maple Leafs win 4–2

Game	Date	Score	Opponent	Series	Recap
1	April 12, 2000	2–0	Ottawa Senators	Maple Leafs lead 1–0	W
2	April 15, 2000	5–1	Ottawa Senators	Maple Leafs lead 2–0	W
3	April 17, 2000	3–4	@ Ottawa Senators	Maple Leafs lead 2–1	L
4	April 19, 2000	1–2	@ Ottawa Senators	Series tied 2–2	L
5	April 22, 2000	2–1 OT	Ottawa Senators	Maple Leafs lead 3–2	W
6	April 24, 2000	4–2	@ Ottawa Senators	Maple Leafs win 4–2	W

Eastern Conference Semifinals vs. (4) New Jersey Devils – Devils win 4–2

Game	Date	Score	Opponent	Series	Recap
1	April 27, 2000	2–1	New Jersey Devils	Maple Leafs lead 1–0	W
2	April 29, 2000	0–1	New Jersey Devils	Series tied 1–1	L
3	May 1, 2000	1–5	@ New Jersey Devils	Devils lead 2–1	L
4	May 3, 2000	3–2	@ New Jersey Devils	Series tied 2–2	W
5	May 6, 2000	3–4	New Jersey Devils	Devils lead 3–2	L
6	May 8, 2000	0–3	@ New Jersey Devils	Devils win 4–2	L

Legend: W Win L Loss

== Player statistics ==
=== Scoring ===
- Position abbreviations: C = Centre; D = Defence; G = Goaltender; LW = Left wing; RW = Right wing
- † = Joined team via a transaction (e.g., trade, waivers, signing) during the season. Stats reflect time with the Maple Leafs only.
- ‡ = Left team via a transaction (e.g., trade, waivers, release) during the season. Stats reflect time with the Maple Leafs only.

No.	Player	Pos	Regular season						Playoffs					
No.	Player	Pos	GP	G	A	Pts	+/-	PIM	GP	G	A	Pts	+/-	PIM
13	Mats Sundin	C	73	32	41	73	16	46	12	3	5	8	8	10
32	Steve Thomas	RW	81	26	37	63	1	68	12	6	3	9	8	10
14	Jonas Hoglund	LW	82	29	27	56	−2	10	12	2	4	6	4	2
22	Igor Korolev	RW	80	20	26	46	12	22	12	0	4	4	−1	6
44	Yanic Perreault	C	58	18	27	45	3	22	1	0	1	1	0	0
15	Tomas Kaberle	D	82	7	33	40	3	24	12	1	4	5	2	0
94	Sergei Berezin	LW	61	26	13	39	8	2	12	4	4	8	2	0
9	Nik Antropov	C	66	12	18	30	14	41	3	0	0	0	1	4
8 (Note: Khristich wore number 19 through December 29.)	Dmitri Khristich†	LW	53	12	18	30	8	24	12	1	2	3	−3	0
34	Bryan Berard	D	64	3	27	30	11	42	—	—	—	—	—	—
36	Dmitri Yushkevich	D	77	3	24	27	2	55	12	1	1	2	4	4
20	Mike Johnson‡	RW	52	11	14	25	8	23	—	—	—	—	—	—
10	Garry Valk	RW	73	10	14	24	−2	44	12	1	2	3	2	14
16	Darcy Tucker†	LW	27	7	10	17	3	55	12	4	2	6	0	15
52	Alexander Karpovtsev	D	69	3	14	17	9	54	11	0	3	3	4	4
4	Cory Cross	D	71	4	11	15	13	64	12	0	2	2	1	2
28	Tie Domi	RW	70	5	9	14	−5	198	12	0	1	1	−5	20
42	Kevyn Adams	C	52	5	8	13	−7	39	12	1	0	1	−2	7
18	Alyn McCauley	C	45	5	5	10	−6	10	5	0	0	0	−4	6
55	Danny Markov	D	59	0	10	10	13	28	12	0	3	3	3	10
12	Kris King	LW	39	2	4	6	4	55	1	0	0	0	0	2
8	Todd Warriner‡	C	18	3	1	4	6	2	—	—	—	—	—	—
17	Wendel Clark†	LW	20	2	2	4	−3	21	6	1	1	2	2	4
2	Gerald Diduck†	D	26	0	3	3	2	33	10	0	1	1	−1	14
33	Chris McAllister	D	36	0	3	3	−4	68	—	—	—	—	—	—
43	Nathan Dempsey	D	6	0	2	2	2	2	—	—	—	—	—	—
21	Adam Mair	C	8	1	0	1	−1	6	5	0	0	0	−3	8
25	Greg Andrusak	D	9	0	1	1	1	4	3	0	0	0	−1	2
3	Sylvain Cote‡	D	3	0	1	1	1	0	—	—	—	—	—	—
30	Glenn Healy	G	20	0	1	1		2	—	—	—	—	—	—
31	Curtis Joseph	G	63	0	1	1		14	12	0	0	0		10
11	Steve Sullivan‡	C	7	0	1	1	−1	4	—	—	—	—	—	—
7	Derek King‡	LW	3	0	0	0	−2	2	—	—	—	—	—	—
24	D. J. Smith	D	3	0	0	0	−1	5	—	—	—	—	—	—
49	Dmitri Yakushin	D	2	0	0	0	0	2	—	—	—	—	—	—
39	Jeff Farkas	C	—	—	—	—	—	—	3	1	0	1	2	0

=== Goaltending ===
No.	Player	Regular season										Playoffs								
No.	Player	GP	W	L	T	SA	GA	GAA	SV%	SO	TOI	GP	W	L	SA	GA	GAA	SV%	SO	TOI
31	Curtis Joseph	63	36	20	7	1854	158	2.49	.915	4	3801	12	6	6	369	25	2.06	.932	1	729
30	Glenn Healy	20	9	10	0	527	59	3.04	.888	2	1164	—	—	—	—	—	—	—	—	—

== Awards and records ==
=== Awards ===
Type	Award/honour	Recipient	Ref
League (annual)	King Clancy Memorial Trophy	Curtis Joseph	
League (in-season)	NHL All-Star Game selection	Curtis Joseph (Note: Joseph and Sundin were voted to the starting lineup.)	
League (in-season)	NHL All-Star Game selection	Pat Quinn (coach)	
League (in-season)	NHL All-Star Game selection	Mats Sundin	
League (in-season)	NHL All-Star Game selection	Dmitri Yushkevich	
League (in-season)	NHL Player of the Week	Curtis Joseph (February 28)	
League (in-season)	NHL Player of the Week	Yanic Perreault (March 13)	
Team	Molson Cup	Curtis Joseph	

=== Milestones ===
Milestone	Player	Date	Ref
First game	Nik Antropov	October 13, 1999	
First game	Dmitri Yakushin	November 29, 1999	
First game	Jeff Farkas	May 3, 2000	
25th shutout	Curtis Joseph	November 3, 1999	
1,000th game played	Steve Thomas	February 26, 2000	

== Transactions ==
The Maple Leafs have been involved in the following transactions during the 1999–2000 season.

=== Trades ===
July 15, 1999	To Atlanta Thrashers Martin Prochazka	To Toronto Maple Leafs 6th round pick in 2001 (Maxim Kondratiev)
August 5, 1999	To Tampa Bay Lightning Jeff Reese; 9th round pick in 2000 (Milan Kopecky)	To Toronto Maple Leafs 9th round pick in 2000 (Jean-Philippe Cote)
August 17, 1999	To New York Islanders Niklas Andersson	To Toronto Maple Leafs Craig Charron
October 1, 1999	To Tampa Bay Lightning Fredrik Modin	To Toronto Maple Leafs Cory Cross; 7th round pick in 2001 (Ivan Kolozvary)
October 8, 1999	To Chicago Blackhawks Sylvain Cote	To Toronto Maple Leafs 2nd round pick in 2001 (Karel Pilar)
October 20, 1999	To St. Louis Blues Derek King	To Toronto Maple Leafs Tyler Harlton
October 20, 1999	To Boston Bruins Ivan Huml	To Toronto Maple Leafs Dmitri Khristich
November 29, 1999	To Tampa Bay Lightning Todd Warriner	To Toronto Maple Leafs 3rd round pick in 2000 (Mikael Tellqvist)
February 9, 2000	To Tampa Bay Lightning Mike Johnson; Marek Posmyk; 5th round pick in 2000 (Pavel Sedov); 6th round pick in 2000 (Aaron Gionet); 5th round pick in 2001 (Terry Denike)	To Toronto Maple Leafs Darcy Tucker; 4th round pick in 2000 (Miguel Delisle); 5th round pick in 2001 (Kyle Wellwood)
February 23, 2000	To Los Angeles Kings Craig Charron	To Toronto Maple Leafs Don MacLean

=== Waivers ===
September 27, 1999	To Atlanta Thrashers Ladislav Kohn
October 23, 1999	To Chicago Blackhawks Steve Sullivan

=== Free agents ===
Player	Former team
Jonas Hoglund	Montreal Canadiens
Greg Andrusak	Pittsburgh Penguins
Terran Sandwith	Mighty Ducks of Anaheim
Jason Bonsignore	Tampa Bay Lightning
Justin Hocking	Chicago Blackhawks
Jimmy Waite	Calgary Flames
Sebastien Centomo	Undrafted Free Agent
Syl Apps III	Undrafted Free Agent
Bryan Fogarty	Chicago Blackhawks
Wendel Clark	Chicago Blackhawks
Gerald Diduck	Phoenix Coyotes

Player	New team
Scott Pearson	New York Islanders
Kevin Dahl	New York Islanders
Dallas Eakins	New York Islanders

== Draft picks ==
Toronto's draft picks at the 1999 NHL entry draft held at the FleetCenter in Boston, Massachusetts.

Round	#	Player	Nationality	College/Junior/Club team (League)
1	24	Luca Cereda (C)	Switzerland	HC Ambrì-Piotta (Switzerland)
2	60	Peter Reynolds (D)	Canada	London Knights (OHL)
4	108	Mirko Murovic (LW)	Canada	Moncton Wildcats (QMJHL)
4	110	Jonathan Zion (D)	Canada	Ottawa 67's (OHL)
5	151	Vaclav Zavoral (D)	Czech Republic	Chemopetrol Litvínov Jr. (Czech Republic)
6	161	Jan Sochor (LW)	Czech Republic	Slavia Prague (Czech Republic)
7	211	Vladimir Kulikov (G)	Russia	CSKA Moscow (Russia)
8	239	Pierre Hedin (D)	Sweden	Modo Hockey (Sweden)
9	267	Peter Metcalf (D)	United States	University of Maine (Hockey East)
