= 1999–2000 New Jersey Devils season =

National Hockey League season

1999–2000 New Jersey Devils
- Stanley Cup champions
- Eastern Conference champions
- Division: 2nd Atlantic
- Conference: 4th Eastern
- 1999–2000 record: 45–24–8–5
- Home record: 28–9–3–1
- Road record: 17–15–5–4
- Goals for: 251
- Goals against: 203

Team information
- General manager: Lou Lamoriello
- Coach: Robbie Ftorek (Oct.–Mar.); Larry Robinson (Mar.–Jun.)
- Captain: Scott Stevens
- Alternate captains: Jason Arnott; Randy McKay
- Arena: Continental Airlines Arena
- Average attendance: 15,206
- Minor league affiliates: Albany River Rats; Augusta Lynx

Team leaders
- Goals: Patrik Elias (35)
- Assists: Scott Gomez (51)
- Points: Patrik Elias (72)
- Penalty minutes: Krzysztof Oliwa (184)
- Plus/minus: Scott Stevens (+30)
- Wins: Martin Brodeur (43)
- Goals against average: Martin Brodeur (2.24)

The 1999–2000 New Jersey Devils season was the 26th season for the National Hockey League (NHL) franchise that was established on June 11, 1974, and 18th season since the franchise relocated from Colorado prior to the 1982–83 NHL season.

After firing head coach Robbie Ftorek on March 23, the team won their second Stanley Cup championship on June 10, 2000, in a double-overtime victory in Game 6 of the 2000 Stanley Cup Final against the Dallas Stars.

== Off-season ==
The summer of 1999 for the New Jersey Devils leading up to the franchise's 18th season in the NHL since the franchise relocated from Colorado was a difficult one, especially after being eliminated in the Eastern Conference semifinals by the New York Rangers in five games in 1997, and in the Eastern Conference quarterfinals the previous two years: to the Ottawa Senators in six games in 1998 and to the Pittsburgh Penguins in seven games in 1999, the latter coming on Continental Airlines Arena ice. With the addition of Claude Lemieux, the 1995 Conn Smythe Trophy winner, returning to the Devils' uniform, the franchise was poised for another run for the Stanley Cup.

== Regular season ==
The Devils finished the regular season with the fewest power-play opportunities (274), but they finished second-overall in power-play percentage, with 20.07% (55 for 274).

=== Season standings ===
Atlantic Division
No.	CR		GP	W	L	T	OTL	GF	GA	Pts
1	1	**Philadelphia Flyers**	82	45	22	12	3	237	179	105
2	4	**New Jersey Devils**	82	45	24	8	5	251	203	103
3	7	**Pittsburgh Penguins**	82	37	31	8	6	241	236	88
4	11	New York Rangers	82	29	38	12	3	218	246	73
5	13	New York Islanders	82	24	48	9	1	194	275	58

Note: CR = Conference rank; GP = Games played; W = Wins; L = Losses; T = Ties; OTL=Overtime loss; GF = Goals for; GA = Goals against; PIM=Penalties in Minutes; Pts = Points
Bolded teams qualified for the playoffs.

Eastern Conference
R		Div	GP	W	L	T	OTL	GF	GA	Pts
**1**	**z – Philadelphia Flyers**	**AT**	**82**	**45**	**22**	**12**	**3**	**237**	**179**	105
**2**	**y – Washington Capitals**	**SE**	**82**	**44**	**24**	**12**	**2**	**227**	**194**	102
**3**	**y – Toronto Maple Leafs**	**NE**	**82**	**45**	**27**	**7**	**3**	**246**	**222**	100
**4**	**New Jersey Devils**	**AT**	**82**	**45**	**24**	**8**	**5**	**251**	**203**	103
**5**	**Florida Panthers**	**SE**	**82**	**43**	**27**	**6**	**6**	**244**	**209**	98
**6**	**Ottawa Senators**	**NE**	**82**	**41**	**28**	**11**	**2**	**244**	**210**	95
**7**	**Pittsburgh Penguins**	**AT**	**82**	**37**	**31**	**8**	**6**	**241**	**236**	88
**8**	**Buffalo Sabres**	**NE**	**82**	**35**	**32**	**11**	**4**	**213**	**204**	85
8.5
9	Carolina Hurricanes	SE	82	37	35	10	0	217	216	84
10	Montreal Canadiens	NE	82	35	34	9	4	196	194	83
11	New York Rangers	AT	82	29	38	12	3	218	246	73
12	Boston Bruins	NE	82	24	33	19	6	210	248	73
13	New York Islanders	AT	82	24	48	9	1	194	275	58
14	Tampa Bay Lightning	SE	82	19	47	9	7	204	310	54
15	Atlanta Thrashers	SE	82	14	57	7	4	170	313	39

Divisions: AT – Atlantic, NE – Northeast, SE – Southeast

bold – Qualified for playoffs; z – Won conference; y – Won division

== Playoffs ==
New Jersey advanced to the Stanley Cup Final with home ice advantage as the fourth seed, becoming the lowest seeded team to have home ice advantage in the Stanley Cup Final. This record was later broken by the Devils again in 2012.

== Schedule and results ==
=== Preseason ===
1999 preseason
Preseason: 6–2–0–1 (home: 4–0–0–0; road: 2–2–0–1)

Game	Date	Score	Opponent	Arena	Record	Points	Result
1	September 12, 1999	3–2	@ Pittsburgh Penguins (1999–2000)	Value City Arena	1–0–0–0	2	W
2	September 17, 1999	4–3 OT	@ New York Islanders (1999–2000)	Nassau Coliseum	2–0–0–0	4	W
3	September 19, 1999	1–6	@ Atlanta Thrashers (1999–2000)	Philips Arena	2–1–0–0	4	L
4	September 20, 1999	2–3 OT	@ New York Rangers (1999–2000)	Madison Square Garden	2–1–0–1	5	OTL
5	September 21, 1999	3–2	New York Rangers (1999–2000)	Continental Airlines Arena	3–1–0–1	7	W
6	September 24, 1999	6–1	Pittsburgh Penguins (1999–2000)	Pepsi Arena	4–1–0–1	9	W
7	September 25, 1999	4–2	Philadelphia Flyers (1999–2000)	Continental Airlines Arena	5–1–0–1	11	W
8	September 26, 1999	2–10	@ Philadelphia Flyers (1999–2000)	First Union Center	5–2–0–1	11	L
9	September 28, 1999	4–3	New York Islanders (1999–2000)	Continental Airlines Arena	6–2–0–1	13	W

Legend: W Win (2 points) L Loss (0 points) T Tie (1 point) OTL Overtime loss (1 point)

=== Regular season ===
1999–2000 regular season
October: 6–3–1–1 (home: 4–1–0–0; road: 2–2–1–1)

Game	Date	Score	Opponent	Record	Points	Recap
1	October 2, 1999	4–1	@ Atlanta Thrashers (1999–2000)	1–0–0–0	2	W
2	October 7, 1999	5–7	Pittsburgh Penguins (1999–2000)	1–1–0–0	2	L
3	October 9, 1999	1–0	Tampa Bay Lightning (1999–2000)	2–1–0–0	4	W
4	October 11, 1999	2–2 OT	@ Ottawa Senators (1999–2000)	2–1–1–0	5	T
5	October 13, 1999	3–2	Mighty Ducks of Anaheim (1999–2000)	3–1–1–0	7	W
6	October 16, 1999	4–1	New York Islanders (1999–2000)	4–1–1–0	9	W
7	October 22, 1999	1–2 OT	@ Dallas Stars (1999–2000)	4–1–1–1	10	OTL
8	October 23, 1999	1–3	@ St. Louis Blues (1999–2000)	4–2–1–1	10	L
9	October 27, 1999	2–1	St. Louis Blues (1999–2000)	5–2–1–1	12	W
10	October 29, 1999	4–2	@ Carolina Hurricanes (1999–2000)	6–2–1–1	14	W
11	October 30, 1999	3–5	@ Philadelphia Flyers (1999–2000)	6–3–1–1	14	L

November: 5–3–2–1 (home: 4–0–2–0; road: 1–3–0–1)

Game	Date	Score	Opponent	Record	Points	Recap
12	November 3, 1999	3–2	Montreal Canadiens (1999–2000)	7–3–1–1	16	W
13	November 4, 1999	1–3	@ Boston Bruins (1999–2000)	7–4–1–1	16	L
14	November 6, 1999	3–3 OT	Toronto Maple Leafs (1999–2000)	7–4–2–1	17	T
15	November 9, 1999	2–1	Philadelphia Flyers (1999–2000)	8–4–2–1	19	W
16	November 12, 1999	5–1	Atlanta Thrashers (1999–2000)	9–4–2–1	21	W
17	November 13, 1999	2–4	@ Washington Capitals (1999–2000)	9–5–2–1	21	L
18	November 17, 1999	2–2 OT	Boston Bruins (1999–2000)	9–5–3–1	22	T
19	November 20, 1999	3–1	Ottawa Senators (1999–2000)	10–5–3–1	24	W
20	November 24, 1999	2–1	@ Mighty Ducks of Anaheim (1999–2000)	11–5–3–1	26	W
21	November 25, 1999	2–4	@ Phoenix Coyotes (1999–2000)	11–6–3–1	26	L
22	November 28, 1999	3–4 OT	@ San Jose Sharks (1999–2000)	11–6–3–2	27	OTL

December: 10–4–1–0 (home: 8–2–0–0; road: 2–2–1–0)

Game	Date	Score	Opponent	Record	Points	Recap
23	December 1, 1999	3–2	New York Rangers (1999–2000)	12–6–3–2	29	W
24	December 3, 1999	7–4	Ottawa Senators (1999–2000)	13–6–3–2	31	W
25	December 4, 1999	2–4	Calgary Flames (1999–2000)	13–7–3–2	31	L
26	December 7, 1999	2–1	Pittsburgh Penguins (1999–2000)	14–7–3–2	33	W
27	December 9, 1999	4–0	@ Chicago Blackhawks (1999–2000)	15–7–3–2	35	W
28	December 11, 1999	1–3	Edmonton Oilers (1999–2000)	15–8–3–2	35	L
29	December 14, 1999	7–1	Los Angeles Kings (1999–2000)	16–8–3–2	37	W
30	December 16, 1999	2–1	@ Montreal Canadiens (1999–2000)	17–8–3–2	39	W
31	December 18, 1999	5–4	Washington Capitals (1999–2000)	18–8–3–2	41	W
32	December 19, 1999	3–5	@ New York Islanders (1999–2000)	18–9–3–2	41	L
33	December 22, 1999	3–2	Philadelphia Flyers (1999–2000)	19–9–3–2	43	W
34	December 23, 1999	1–4	@ Toronto Maple Leafs (1999–2000)	19–10–3–2	43	L
35	December 26, 1999	3–3 OT	@ New York Rangers (1999–2000)	19–10–4–2	44	T
36	December 27, 1999	4–1	Buffalo Sabres (1999–2000)	20–10–4–2	46	W
37	December 29, 1999	5–4 OT	Boston Bruins (1999–2000)	21–10–4–2	48	W

January: 10–1–1–2 (home: 4–0–0–1; road: 6–1–1–1)

Game	Date	Score	Opponent	Record	Points	Recap
38	January 1, 2000	2–2 OT	@ Boston Bruins (1999–2000)	21–10–5–2	49	T
39	January 3, 2000	4–3 OT	@ Ottawa Senators (1999–2000)	22–10–5–2	51	W
40	January 5, 2000	3–1	@ Pittsburgh Penguins (1999–2000)	23–10–5–2	53	W
41	January 6, 2000	6–3	@ Buffalo Sabres (1999–2000)	24–10–5–2	55	W
42	January 8, 2000	4–3	Phoenix Coyotes (1999–2000)	25–10–5–2	57	W
43	January 11, 2000	6–5	@ Tampa Bay Lightning (1999–2000)	26–10–5–2	59	W
44	January 14, 2000	2–3 OT	Washington Capitals (1999–2000)	26–10–5–3	60	OTL
45	January 15, 2000	4–1	@ Philadelphia Flyers (1999–2000)	27–10–5–3	62	W
46	January 17, 2000	5–2	Carolina Hurricanes (1999–2000)	28–10–5–3	64	W
47	January 19, 2000	4–1	Chicago Blackhawks (1999–2000)	29–10–5–3	66	W
48	January 21, 2000	4–0	New York Islanders (1999–2000)	30–10–5–3	68	W
49	January 26, 2000	3–2	@ Florida Panthers (1999–2000)	31–10–5–3	70	W
50	January 28, 2000	3–4 OT	@ Carolina Hurricanes (1999–2000)	31–10–5–4	71	OTL
51	January 29, 2000	1–3	@ Detroit Red Wings (1999–2000)	31–11–5–4	71	L

February: 7–3–2–1 (home: 5–2–1–0; road: 2–1–1–1)

Game	Date	Score	Opponent	Record	Points	Recap
52	February 2, 2000	3–1	@ New York Rangers (1999–2000)	32–11–5–4	73	W
53	February 3, 2000	4–1	Nashville Predators (1999–2000)	33–11–5–4	75	W
54	February 8, 2000	2–2 OT	@ New York Rangers (1999–2000)	33–11–6–4	76	T
55	February 9, 2000	4–1	New York Rangers (1999–2000)	34–11–6–4	78	W
56	February 13, 2000	3–1	San Jose Sharks (1999–2000)	35–11–6–4	80	W
57	February 15, 2000	4–2	Philadelphia Flyers (1999–2000)	36–11–6–4	82	W
58	February 17, 2000	5–5 OT	Colorado Avalanche (1999–2000)	36–11–7–4	83	T
59	February 19, 2000	2–4	New York Islanders (1999–2000)	36–12–7–4	83	L
60	February 21, 2000	2–3	@ Buffalo Sabres (1999–2000)	36–13–7–4	83	L
61	February 24, 2000	2–3 OT	@ Montreal Canadiens (1999–2000)	36–13–7–5	84	OTL
62	February 25, 2000	1–3	Toronto Maple Leafs (1999–2000)	36–14–7–5	84	L
63	February 27, 2000	3–0	Montreal Canadiens (1999–2000)	37–14–7–5	86	W
64	February 29, 2000	2–1	@ Nashville Predators (1999–2000)	38–14–7–5	88	W

March: 5–8–1–0 (home: 2–3–0–0; road: 3–5–1–0)

Game	Date	Score	Opponent	Record	Points	Recap
65	March 2, 2000	0–5	@ Colorado Avalanche (1999–2000)	38–15–7–5	88	L
66	March 4, 2000	2–4	@ Vancouver Canucks (1999–2000)	38–16–7–5	88	L
67	March 5, 2000	2–2 OT	@ Calgary Flames (1999–2000)	38–16–8–5	89	T
68	March 10, 2000	9–0	@ Atlanta Thrashers (1999–2000)	39–16–8–5	91	W
69	March 11, 2000	2–4	@ Washington Capitals (1999–2000)	39–17–8–5	91	L
70	March 13, 2000	3–2	@ Pittsburgh Penguins (1999–2000)	40–17–8–5	93	W
71	March 15, 2000	2–3	Dallas Stars (1999–2000)	40–18–8–5	93	L
72	March 17, 2000	1–3	Tampa Bay Lightning (1999–2000)	40–19–8–5	93	L
73	March 19, 2000	5–2	Florida Panthers (1999–2000)	41–19–8–5	95	W
74	March 21, 2000	0–5	Carolina Hurricanes (1999–2000)	41–20–8–5	95	L
75	March 24, 2000	8–2	@ New York Islanders (1999–2000)	42–20–8–5	97	W
76	March 25, 2000	3–5	@ Toronto Maple Leafs (1999–2000)	42–21–8–5	97	L
77	March 28, 2000	2–3	@ Pittsburgh Penguins (1999–2000)	42–22–8–5	97	L
78	March 31, 2000	6–0	Atlanta Thrashers (1999–2000)	43–22–8–5	99	W

April: 2–2–0–0 (home: 1–1–0–0; road: 1–1–0–0)

Game	Date	Score	Opponent	Record	Points	Recap
79	April 2, 2000	4–1	@ Tampa Bay Lightning (1999–2000)	44–22–8–5	101	W
80	April 3, 2000	2–5	@ Florida Panthers (1999–2000)	44–23–8–5	101	L
81	April 6, 2000	0–5	Buffalo Sabres (1999–2000)	44–24–8–5	101	L
82	April 8, 2000	2–1 OT	Florida Panthers (1999–2000)	45–24–8–5	103	W

Legend: W Win (2 points) L Loss (0 points) T Tie (1 point) OTL Overtime loss (1 point)

=== Playoffs ===
2000 Stanley Cup playoffs
Eastern Conference Quarterfinals vs. (5) Florida Panthers – Devils win 4–0

Game	Date	Score	Opponent	Series	Recap
1	April 13, 2000	4–3	Florida Panthers	Devils lead 1–0	W
2	April 16, 2000	2–1	Florida Panthers	Devils lead 2–0	W
3	April 18, 2000	2–1	@ Florida Panthers	Devils lead 3–0	W
4	April 20, 2000	4–1	@ Florida Panthers	Devils win 4–0	W

Eastern Conference Semifinals vs. (3) Toronto Maple Leafs – Devils win 4–2

Game	Date	Score	Opponent	Series	Recap
1	April 27, 2000	1–2	@ Toronto Maple Leafs	Maple Leafs lead 1–0	L
2	April 29, 2000	1–0	@ Toronto Maple Leafs	Series tied 1–1	W
3	May 1, 2000	5–1	Toronto Maple Leafs	Devils lead 2–1	W
4	May 3, 2000	2–3	Toronto Maple Leafs	Series tied 2–2	L
5	May 6, 2000	4–3	@ Toronto Maple Leafs	Devils lead 3–2	W
6	May 8, 2000	3–0	Toronto Maple Leafs	Devils win 4–2	W

Eastern Conference Finals vs. (1) Philadelphia Flyers – Devils win 4–3

Game	Date	Score	Opponent	Series	Recap
1	May 14, 2000	4–1	@ Philadelphia Flyers	Devils lead 1–0	W
2	May 16, 2000	3–4	@ Philadelphia Flyers	Series tied 1–1	L
3	May 18, 2000	2–4	Philadelphia Flyers	Flyers lead 2–1	L
4	May 20, 2000	1–3	Philadelphia Flyers	Flyers lead 3–1	L
5	May 22, 2000	4–1	@ Philadelphia Flyers	Flyers lead 3–2	W
6	May 24, 2000	2–1	Philadelphia Flyers	Series tied 3–3	W
7	May 26, 2000	2–1	@ Philadelphia Flyers	Devils win 4–3	W

Stanley Cup Final vs. (W2) Dallas Stars – Devils win 4–2

Game	Date	Score	Opponent	Series	Recap
1	May 30, 2000	7–3	Dallas Stars	Devils lead 1–0	W
2	June 1, 2000	1–2	Dallas Stars	Series tied 1–1	L
3	June 3, 2000	2–1	@ Dallas Stars	Devils lead 2–1	W
4	June 5, 2000	3–1	@ Dallas Stars	Devils lead 3–1	W
5	June 8, 2000	0–1 3OT	Dallas Stars	Devils lead 3–2	L
6	June 10, 2000	2–1 2OT	@ Dallas Stars	Devils win 4–2	W

Legend: W Win L Loss

== Player statistics ==
=== Scoring ===
- Position abbreviations: C = Center; D = Defense; G = Goaltender; LW = Left wing; RW = Right wing
- † = Joined team via a transaction (e.g., trade, waivers, signing) during the season. Stats reflect time with the Devils only.
- ‡ = Left team via a transaction (e.g., trade, waivers, release) during the season. Stats reflect time with the Devils only.

No.	Player	Pos	Regular season						Playoffs					
No.	Player	Pos	GP	G	A	Pts	+/-	PIM	GP	G	A	Pts	+/-	PIM
26	Patrik Elias	LW	72	35	37	72	16	58	23	7	13	20	9	9
23	Scott Gomez	C	82	19	51	70	14	78	23	4	6	10	1	4
17	Petr Sykora	RW	79	25	43	68	24	26	23	9	8	17	8	10
25	Jason Arnott	C	76	22	34	56	22	51	23	8	12	20	7	18
16	Bobby Holik	C	79	23	23	46	7	106	23	3	7	10	−1	14
21	Randy McKay	RW	67	16	23	39	8	80	23	0	6	6	−1	9
22	Claude Lemieux†	RW	70	17	21	38	−3	86	23	4	6	10	7	28
27	Scott Niedermayer	D	71	7	31	38	19	48	22	5	2	7	5	10
28	Brian Rafalski	D	75	5	27	32	21	28	23	2	6	8	5	8
4	Scott Stevens	D	78	8	21	29	30	103	23	3	8	11	9	6
12	Sergei Nemchinov	LW	53	10	16	26	1	18	21	3	2	5	1	2
9	Brendan Morrison‡	C	44	5	21	26	8	8	—	—	—	—	—	—
11	John Madden	C	74	16	9	25	7	6	20	3	4	7	4	0
18	Sergei Brylin	LW	64	9	11	20	0	20	17	3	5	8	2	0
29	Krzysztof Oliwa	LW	69	6	10	16	−2	184	—	—	—	—	—	—
24	Lyle Odelein‡	D	57	1	15	16	−10	104	—	—	—	—	—	—
20	Jay Pandolfo	LW	71	7	8	15	0	4	23	0	5	5	3	0
2	Sheldon Souray‡	D	52	0	8	8	−6	70	—	—	—	—	—	—
8	Vadim Sharifijanov‡	LW	20	3	4	7	−6	8	—	—	—	—	—	—
89	Alexander Mogilny†	RW	12	3	3	6	−4	4	23	4	3	7	1	4
19	Denis Pederson‡	C	35	3	3	6	−7	16	—	—	—	—	—	—
3	Ken Daneyko	D	78	0	6	6	13	98	23	1	2	3	−2	14
30	Martin Brodeur	G	72	1	4	5		16	23	0	0	0		10
7	Vladimir Malakhov†	D	17	1	4	5	1	19	23	1	4	5	3	18
6	Brad Bombardir	D	32	3	1	4	−6	6	1	0	0	0	0	0
14	Brian Rolston‡	LW	11	3	1	4	−2	0	—	—	—	—	—	—
5	Colin White	D	21	2	1	3	3	40	23	1	5	6	9	18
2	Ken Sutton†	D	6	0	2	2	2	2	—	—	—	—	—	—
2	Deron Quint†‡	D	4	1	0	1	−2	2	—	—	—	—	—	—
15	Eric Bertrand‡	LW	4	0	0	0	−1	0	—	—	—	—	—	—
15	Steve Kelly†	C	1	0	0	0	0	0	10	0	0	0	−1	4
24	Willie Mitchell	D	2	0	0	0	1	0	—	—	—	—	—	—
31	Chris Terreri	G	12	0	0	0		2	—	—	—	—	—	—
10	Steve Brule	RW	—	—	—	—	—	—	1	0	0	0	0	0

=== Goaltending ===
No.	Player	Regular season										Playoffs								
No.	Player	GP	W	L	T	SA	GA	GAA	SV%	SO	TOI	GP	W	L	SA	GA	GAA	SV%	SO	TOI
30	Martin Brodeur	72	43	20	8	1797	161	2.24	.910	6	4312	23	16	7	537	39	1.61	.927	2	1450
31	Chris Terreri	12	2	9	0	299	37	3.42	.876	0	649	—	—	—	—	—	—	—	—	—

== Awards and records ==
=== Awards ===
Type	Award/honor	Recipient	Ref
League (annual)	Bill Masterton Memorial Trophy	Ken Daneyko	
League (annual)	Calder Memorial Trophy	Scott Gomez	
League (annual)	Conn Smythe Trophy	Scott Stevens	
League (annual)	NHL All-Rookie Team	Scott Gomez (Forward)	
League (annual)	NHL All-Rookie Team	Brian Rafalski (Defense)	
League (in-season)	NHL All-Star Game selection	Martin Brodeur	
League (in-season)	NHL All-Star Game selection	Patrik Elias (Note: Elias was an injury replacement for Peter Forsberg of the Colorado Avalanche.)	
League (in-season)	NHL All-Star Game selection	Scott Gomez	
League (in-season)	NHL All-Star Game selection	Scott Stevens	
League (in-season)	NHL Rookie of the Month	Scott Gomez (November)	
League (in-season)	NHL Rookie of the Month	Brian Rafalski (February)	
Team	Devils' Players' Player	Randy McKay	
Team	Hugh Delano Unsung Hero	John Madden	
Team	Most Valuable Devil	Martin Brodeur	
Team	Three-Star Award	Martin Brodeur	

=== Milestones ===
Milestone	Player	Date	Ref
First game	Scott Gomez	October 2, 1999	
First game	Brian Rafalski	October 2, 1999	
First game	Eric Bertrand	October 7, 1999	
First game	Colin White	January 11, 2000	
First game	Willie Mitchell	March 25, 2000	
First game	Steve Brule	May 18, 2000	
1,000th game played	Ken Daneyko	October 29, 1999	
1,000th game played	Claude Lemieux	April 6, 2000	

== Draft picks ==
The Devils' draft picks at the 1999 NHL entry draft at the FleetCenter in Boston.

Rd #	Pick #	Player	Nat	Pos	Team (League)	Notes
1	27	Ari Ahonen	Finland	G	JYP (SM-liiga)	
2	42	Mike Commodore	Canada	D	University of North Dakota (WCHA)	(Note: Compensatory pick awarded by the NHL as compensation for free agent Doug Gilmour. The Devils traded their original 1999 second-round pick (used on Stepan Mokhov) to Chicago for Chris Terreri on August 25, 1998.)
2	50	Brett Clouthier	Canada	LW	Kingston Frontenacs (OHL)	(Note: The Devils acquired the 1999 second-round pick along with Ken Sutton from St. Louis for Mike Peluso and Ricard Persson on November 26, 1996.)
3	95	Andre Lakos	Austria	D	Barrie Colts (OHL)	(Note: The Devils had originally traded this pick to Toronto when they acquired Dave Andreychuk, but got it back (along with Dave Ellett and Doug Gilmour) in a later deal with Toronto in exchange for Jason Smith, Steve Sullivan and the rights to Alyn McCauley.)
4	100	Teemu Kesa	Finland	D	Ilves Jr. (SM-liiga)	(Note: Compensatory pick awarded by the NHL as compensation for free agent Steve Thomas. The Devils traded their original 1999 fourth-round pick (later transferred to Los Angeles and used on Daniel Johansson) to New York (I) for Sergei Nemchinov on March 22, 1999.)
5	155	No fifth-round pick				(Note: The Devils traded their 1999 fifth-round pick (used on Niko Dimitrakos) to San Jose for Ken Sutton on August 26, 1998.)
6	185	Scott Cameron	Canada	LW	Barrie Colts (OHL)	
7	214	Chris Hartsburg	United States	C	Colorado College (WCHA)	
8	242	Justin Dziama	United States	F	Noble and Greenough School (Massachusetts Independent School League)	
9	270	No ninth-round pick				(Note: The Devils traded their 1999 ninth-round pick (used on James Desmarais), along with Chris McAlpine, to St. Louis for Peter Zezel on February 11, 1997.)

== Media ==
Television coverage was on Fox Sports Net with Mike Emrick and Chico Resch and radio coverage was on WABC 770 with Mike Milbury.

== See also ==
- 1999–2000 NHL season
