= 1999–2000 Ottawa Senators season =

Professional ice hockey team season

1999–2000 Ottawa Senators
- Division: 2nd Northeast
- Conference: 6th Eastern
- 1999–2000 record: 41–28–11–2
- Home record: 24–10–5–2
- Road record: 17–18–6–0
- Goals for: 244
- Goals against: 210

Team information
- General manager: Marshall Johnston
- Coach: Jacques Martin
- Captain: Daniel Alfredsson
- Alternate captains: Shawn McEachern; Wade Redden
- Arena: Corel Centre
- Average attendance: 17,508
- Minor league affiliates: Grand Rapids Griffins; Mobile Mysticks

Team leaders
- Goals: Marian Hossa and Shawn McEachern (29)
- Assists: Daniel Alfredsson (38)
- Points: Radek Bonk (60)
- Penalty minutes: Andre Roy (145)
- Plus/minus: Shaun Van Allen (+20)
- Wins: Patrick Lalime (19)
- Goals against average: Patrick Lalime (2.33)

The 1999–2000 Ottawa Senators season was the eighth season of the Ottawa Senators of the National Hockey League (NHL). This season saw the Senators drop in the standings, as they finished with 95 points, down from the 103 they registered the previous season. They finished second in the Northeast Division and sixth in the Eastern Conference. They qualified for the Stanley Cup playoffs for the fourth straight season.

== Regular season ==
This season is remembered by fans as the one in which star forward Alexei Yashin chose to sit out due to a contract dispute. He was entering the final year of a five-year contract that he signed with Ottawa in 1995. However, Yashin demanded a significant pay raise following an impressive 1998–99 season and issued a deadline, stating that if the Senators did not offer him a new contract, or he would miss the entire season. The Senators opted not to sign him, and Yashin sat out the entire 1999–2000 season.

In Yashin's absence, Daniel Alfredsson was named captain, and, despite missing 25 games due to various injuries, he recorded 59 points—second only to Radek Bonk, who led the team with 60. Marian Hossa tied Shawn McEachern for the team lead in goals, with 29.

The Senators traded goaltender Damian Rhodes to the Atlanta Thrashers as part of a deal during the 1999 NHL Expansion draft, and acquired Patrick Lalime from the Mighty Ducks of Anaheim to split goaltending duties with Ron Tugnutt. Tugnutt had a subpar season by his standards, and was traded to the Pittsburgh Penguins for Tom Barrasso, a two-time Stanley Cup champion at the trade deadline.

=== Final standings ===
Northeast Division
No.	CR		GP	W	L	T	OTL	GF	GA	Pts
1	3	**Toronto Maple Leafs**	82	45	27	7	3	246	222	100
2	6	**Ottawa Senators**	82	41	28	11	2	244	210	95
3	8	**Buffalo Sabres**	82	35	32	11	4	213	204	85
4	10	Montreal Canadiens	82	35	34	9	4	196	194	83
5	11	Boston Bruins	82	24	33	19	6	210	248	73

Note: CR = Conference rank; GP = Games played; W = Wins; L = Losses; T = Ties; GF = Goals for; GA = Goals against; Pts = Points
Bolded teams qualified for the playoffs.

Eastern Conference
R		Div	GP	W	L	T	OTL	GF	GA	Pts
**1**	**z – Philadelphia Flyers**	**AT**	**82**	**45**	**22**	**12**	**3**	**237**	**179**	105
**2**	**y – Washington Capitals**	**SE**	**82**	**44**	**24**	**12**	**2**	**227**	**194**	102
**3**	**y – Toronto Maple Leafs**	**NE**	**82**	**45**	**27**	**7**	**3**	**246**	**222**	100
**4**	**New Jersey Devils**	**AT**	**82**	**45**	**24**	**8**	**5**	**251**	**203**	103
**5**	**Florida Panthers**	**SE**	**82**	**43**	**27**	**6**	**6**	**244**	**209**	98
**6**	**Ottawa Senators**	**NE**	**82**	**41**	**28**	**11**	**2**	**244**	**210**	95
**7**	**Pittsburgh Penguins**	**AT**	**82**	**37**	**31**	**8**	**6**	**241**	**236**	88
**8**	**Buffalo Sabres**	**NE**	**82**	**35**	**32**	**11**	**4**	**213**	**204**	85
8.5
9	Carolina Hurricanes	SE	82	37	35	10	0	217	216	84
10	Montreal Canadiens	NE	82	35	34	9	4	196	194	83
11	New York Rangers	AT	82	29	38	12	3	218	246	73
12	Boston Bruins	NE	82	24	33	19	6	210	248	73
13	New York Islanders	AT	82	24	48	9	1	194	275	58
14	Tampa Bay Lightning	SE	82	19	47	9	7	204	310	54
15	Atlanta Thrashers	SE	82	14	57	7	4	170	313	39

Divisions: AT – Atlantic, NE – Northeast, SE – Southeast

bold – Qualified for playoffs; z – Won conference; y – Won division

== Playoffs ==
Barrasso was the starting goalie going into the playoffs. However, it was a short stay for the goaltender, as the Senators were eliminated in six games in the first round by their provincial rivals, the Toronto Maple Leafs. The series was the first Ottawa–Toronto Stanley Cup series since 1922, when the original Senators defeated the St. Patricks in an NHL playoff.

Toronto was the higher seed and drew home ice advantage. The first five games were all won by the home team. The Maple Leafs won 4–2 in Game 6 at Ottawa to win the series four games to two.

== Schedule and results ==
=== Regular season ===
1999–2000 regular season
October: 8–2–1–1 (home: 5–0–1–1; road: 3–2–0–0)

Game	Date	Score	Opponent	Record	Attendance	Recap
1	October 2, 1999	3–0	@ Philadelphia Flyers (1999–2000)	1–0–0–0	19,541	W
2	October 5, 1999	2–1	@ New York Rangers (1999–2000)	2–0–0–0	18,200	W
3	October 7, 1999	4–3	Boston Bruins (1999–2000)	3–0–0–0	18,500	W
4	October 9, 1999	4–3	Toronto Maple Leafs (1999–2000)	4–0–0–0	18,500	W
5	October 11, 1999	2–2 OT	New Jersey Devils (1999–2000)	4–0–1–0	15,269	T
6	October 14, 1999	3–4	@ Phoenix Coyotes (1999–2000)	4–1–1–0	13,879	L
7	October 16, 1999	1–3	@ Colorado Avalanche (1999–2000)	4–2–1–0	18,007	L
8	October 21, 1999	4–1	Colorado Avalanche (1999–2000)	5–2–1–0	17,474	W
9	October 23, 1999	4–0	Buffalo Sabres (1999–2000)	6–2–1–0	16,081	W
10	October 28, 1999	3–4 OT	Calgary Flames (1999–2000)	6–2–1–1	15,903	OTL
11	October 30, 1999	5–0	Florida Panthers (1999–2000)	7–2–1–1	15,239	W
12	October 31, 1999	6–4	@ Atlanta Thrashers (1999–2000)	8–2–1–1	15,541	W

November: 6–6–1–0 (home: 4–2–1–0; road: 2–4–0–0)

Game	Date	Score	Opponent	Record	Attendance	Recap
13	November 3, 1999	1–3	@ Washington Capitals (1999–2000)	8–3–1–1	11,012	L
14	November 4, 1999	2–1	Pittsburgh Penguins (1999–2000)	9–3–1–1	16,279	W
15	November 6, 1999	2–1	Montreal Canadiens (1999–2000)	10–3–1–1	18,500	W
16	November 10, 1999	4–3	@ New York Rangers (1999–2000)	11–3–1–1	18,200	W
17	November 11, 1999	1–2	Nashville Predators (1999–2000)	11–4–1–1	14,765	L
18	November 13, 1999	4–2	Mighty Ducks of Anaheim (1999–2000)	12–4–1–1	18,500	W
19	November 17, 1999	1–2	@ Carolina Hurricanes (1999–2000)	12–5–1–1	11,237	L
20	November 18, 1999	1–4	San Jose Sharks (1999–2000)	12–6–1–1	16,976	L
21	November 20, 1999	1–3	@ New Jersey Devils (1999–2000)	12–7–1–1	15,027	L
22	November 25, 1999	6–3	@ Atlanta Thrashers (1999–2000)	13–7–1–1	16,457	W
23	November 26, 1999	0–5	@ Pittsburgh Penguins (1999–2000)	13–8–1–1	17,115	L
24	November 28, 1999	3–3 OT	Philadelphia Flyers (1999–2000)	13–8–2–1	17,709	T
25	November 30, 1999	2–1	Chicago Blackhawks (1999–2000)	14–8–2–1	17,875	W

December: 5–3–4–0 (home: 2–1–2–0; road: 3–2–2–0)

Game	Date	Score	Opponent	Record	Attendance	Recap
26	December 3, 1999	4–7	@ New Jersey Devils (1999–2000)	14–9–2–1	12,393	L
27	December 4, 1999	1–3	Dallas Stars (1999–2000)	14–10–2–1	18,211	L
28	December 8, 1999	0–0 OT	@ Buffalo Sabres (1999–2000)	14–10–3–1	16,789	T
29	December 11, 1999	1–1 OT	New York Islanders (1999–2000)	14–10–4–1	17,129	T
30	December 13, 1999	3–1	@ Toronto Maple Leafs (1999–2000)	15–10–4–1	19,087	W
31	December 16, 1999	2–1	@ Vancouver Canucks (1999–2000)	16–10–4–1	14,120	W
32	December 18, 1999	1–2	@ Calgary Flames (1999–2000)	16–11–4–1	14,549	L
33	December 19, 1999	3–3 OT	@ Edmonton Oilers (1999–2000)	16–11–5–1	16,217	T
34	December 23, 1999	4–3	Carolina Hurricanes (1999–2000)	17–11–5–1	18,500	W
35	December 27, 1999	4–4 OT	Montreal Canadiens (1999–2000)	17–11–6–1	18,500	T
36	December 29, 1999	3–2	@ Montreal Canadiens (1999–2000)	18–11–6–1	21,273	W
37	December 30, 1999	5–4 OT	Boston Bruins (1999–2000)	19–11–6–1	18,500	W

January: 6–5–2–1 (home: 2–3–0–1; road: 4–2–2–0)

Game	Date	Score	Opponent	Record	Attendance	Recap
38	January 3, 2000	3–4 OT	New Jersey Devils (1999–2000)	19–11–6–2	18,181	OTL
39	January 4, 2000	2–1	@ Carolina Hurricanes (1999–2000)	20–11–6–2	7,848	W
40	January 6, 2000	5–2	Phoenix Coyotes (1999–2000)	21–11–6–2	17,484	W
41	January 8, 2000	4–7	Buffalo Sabres (1999–2000)	21–12–6–2	18,500	L
42	January 11, 2000	4–3	@ Los Angeles Kings (1999–2000)	22–12–6–2	14,224	W
43	January 12, 2000	2–0	@ Mighty Ducks of Anaheim (1999–2000)	23–12–6–2	12,501	W
44	January 16, 2000	1–2	@ Washington Capitals (1999–2000)	23–13–6–2	13,749	L
45	January 17, 2000	4–3 OT	@ New York Islanders (1999–2000)	24–13–6–2	7,247	W
46	January 20, 2000	1–1 OT	@ Philadelphia Flyers (1999–2000)	24–13–7–2	19,602	T
47	January 22, 2000	2–3	Detroit Red Wings (1999–2000)	24–14–7–2	18,500	L
48	January 24, 2000	3–3 OT	@ Toronto Maple Leafs (1999–2000)	24–14–8–2	19,210	T
49	January 26, 2000	1–4	St. Louis Blues (1999–2000)	24–15–8–2	18,078	L
50	January 28, 2000	0–1	@ Buffalo Sabres (1999–2000)	24–16–8–2	18,690	L
51	January 29, 2000	3–2	New York Rangers (1999–2000)	25–16–8–2	18,211	W

February: 6–4–2–0 (home: 4–1–1–0; road: 2–3–1–0)

Game	Date	Score	Opponent	Record	Attendance	Recap
52	February 1, 2000	4–4 OT	Boston Bruins (1999–2000)	25–16–9–2	17,756	T
53	February 3, 2000	2–4	@ Buffalo Sabres (1999–2000)	25–17–9–2	18,690	L
54	February 11, 2000	5–3	Florida Panthers (1999–2000)	26–17–9–2	17,763	W
55	February 12, 2000	4–5	@ Montreal Canadiens (1999–2000)	26–18–9–2	21,273	L
56	February 15, 2000	5–1	Carolina Hurricanes (1999–2000)	27–18–9–2	16,610	W
57	February 17, 2000	6–2	Tampa Bay Lightning (1999–2000)	28–18–9–2	16,214	W
58	February 19, 2000	1–3	Vancouver Canucks (1999–2000)	28–19–9–2	18,500	L
59	February 21, 2000	4–2	@ Florida Panthers (1999–2000)	29–19–9–2	15,226	W
60	February 24, 2000	4–5	@ Tampa Bay Lightning (1999–2000)	29–20–9–2	13,343	L
61	February 26, 2000	4–2	New York Rangers (1999–2000)	30–20–9–2	18,500	W
62	February 28, 2000	1–1 OT	@ Pittsburgh Penguins (1999–2000)	30–20–10–2	16,081	T
63	February 29, 2000	5–3	@ Boston Bruins (1999–2000)	31–20–10–2	15,150	W

March: 7–6–1–0 (home: 5–2–0–0; road: 2–4–1–0)

Game	Date	Score	Opponent	Record	Attendance	Recap
64	March 2, 2000	5–5 OT	@ New York Islanders (1999–2000)	31–20–11–2	6,224	T
65	March 4, 2000	3–2	Atlanta Thrashers (1999–2000)	32–20–11–2	17,411	W
66	March 6, 2000	5–1	@ Boston Bruins (1999–2000)	33–20–11–2	15,836	W
67	March 9, 2000	7–0	Pittsburgh Penguins (1999–2000)	34–20–11–2	16,737	W
68	March 11, 2000	2–4	Toronto Maple Leafs (1999–2000)	34–21–11–2	18,500	L
69	March 15, 2000	3–1	@ Calgary Flames (1999–2000)	35–21–11–2	16,642	W
70	March 17, 2000	2–4	@ Edmonton Oilers (1999–2000)	35–22–11–2	17,100	L
71	March 18, 2000	1–6	@ Vancouver Canucks (1999–2000)	35–23–11–2	17,762	L
72	March 21, 2000	7–1	Atlanta Thrashers (1999–2000)	36–23–11–2	16,408	W
73	March 23, 2000	3–2	Toronto Maple Leafs (1999–2000)	37–23–11–2	18,500	W
74	March 25, 2000	3–4	Washington Capitals (1999–2000)	37–24–11–2	18,136	L
75	March 28, 2000	5–2	Philadelphia Flyers (1999–2000)	38–24–11–2	17,903	W
76	March 30, 2000	3–6	@ Tampa Bay Lightning (1999–2000)	38–25–11–2	13,310	L
77	March 31, 2000	1–3	@ Florida Panthers (1999–2000)	38–26–11–2	14,835	L

April: 3–2–0–0 (home: 2–1–0–0; road: 1–1–0–0)

Game	Date	Score	Opponent	Record	Attendance	Recap
78	April 2, 2000	1–4	@ St. Louis Blues (1999–2000)	38–27–11–2	19,713	L
79	April 4, 2000	4–0	Washington Capitals (1999–2000)	39–27–11–2	16,902	W
80	April 6, 2000	1–2	New York Islanders (1999–2000)	39–28–11–2	16,626	L
81	April 8, 2000	3–1	@ Montreal Canadiens (1999–2000)	40–28–11–2	21,273	W
82	April 9, 2000	5–2	Tampa Bay Lightning (1999–2000)	41–28–11–2	18,022	W

Legend: W Win (2 points) L Loss (0 points) T Tie (1 point) OTL Overtime loss (1 point)

=== Playoffs ===
2000 Stanley Cup playoffs
Eastern Conference Quarterfinals vs. (3) Toronto Maple Leafs – Maple Leafs win 4–2

Game	Date	Score	Opponent	Series	Attendance	Recap
1	April 12, 2000	0–2	@ Toronto Maple Leafs	Maple Leafs lead 1–0	19,330	L
2	April 15, 2000	1–5	@ Toronto Maple Leafs	Maple Leafs lead 2–0	19,391	L
3	April 17, 2000	4–3	Toronto Maple Leafs	Maple Leafs lead 2–1	18,500	W
4	April 19, 2000	2–1	Toronto Maple Leafs	Series tied 2–2	18,500	W
5	April 22, 2000	1–2	@ Toronto Maple Leafs	Maple Leafs lead 3–2	19,393	L
6	April 24, 2000	2–4	Toronto Maple Leafs	Maple Leafs win 4–2	18,500	L

Legend: W Win L Loss

== Player statistics ==
=== Scoring ===
- Position abbreviations: C = Centre; D = Defence; G = Goaltender; LW = Left wing; RW = Right wing
- † = Joined team via a transaction (e.g., trade, waivers, signing) during the season. Stats reflect time with the Senators only.
- ‡ = Left team via a transaction (e.g., trade, waivers, release) during the season. Stats reflect time with the Senators only.

No.	Player	Pos	Regular season						Playoffs					
No.	Player	Pos	GP	G	A	Pts	+/-	PIM	GP	G	A	Pts	+/-	PIM
14	Radek Bonk	C	80	23	37	60	−2	53	6	0	0	0	−6	8
11	Daniel Alfredsson	RW	57	21	38	59	11	28	6	1	3	4	0	2
18	Marian Hossa	RW	78	29	27	56	5	32	6	0	0	0	−8	2
13	Vaclav Prospal	C	79	22	33	55	−2	40	6	0	4	4	−1	4
15	Shawn McEachern	LW	69	29	22	51	2	24	6	0	3	3	0	4
39 (Note: Juneau wore number 28 through March 21.)	Joe Juneau†	C	65	13	24	37	3	22	6	2	1	3	−1	0
6	Wade Redden	D	81	10	26	36	−1	49	—	—	—	—	—	—
10	Andreas Dackell	RW	82	10	25	35	5	18	6	2	1	3	0	2
33	Jason York	D	79	8	22	30	−3	60	6	0	2	2	1	2
20	Magnus Arvedson	LW	47	15	13	28	4	36	6	0	0	0	−6	6
22	Shaun Van Allen	C	75	9	19	28	20	37	6	0	1	1	0	9
3	Patrick Traverse	D	66	6	17	23	17	21	6	0	0	0	−2	2
7	Rob Zamuner	LW	57	9	12	21	−6	32	6	2	0	2	1	2
4	Chris Phillips	D	65	5	14	19	12	39	6	0	1	1	0	4
29	Igor Kravchuk	D	64	6	12	18	−5	20	6	1	1	2	−5	0
5	Sami Salo	D	37	6	8	14	6	2	6	1	1	2	−8	0
9	Kevin Dineen	RW	67	4	8	12	2	57	—	—	—	—	—	—
27	Janne Laukkanen‡	D	60	1	11	12	14	55	—	—	—	—	—	—
12	Mike Fisher	C	32	4	5	9	−6	15	—	—	—	—	—	—
26	Andre Roy	RW	73	4	3	7	3	145	5	0	0	0	0	2
17	Colin Forbes†	C	45	2	5	7	−1	12	5	1	0	1	0	14
56	Petr Schastlivy	LW	13	2	5	7	4	2	1	0	0	0	0	0
2	Grant Ledyard†	D	40	2	4	6	−3	8	6	0	0	0	0	16
21	Kevin Miller	C	9	3	2	5	1	2	1	0	0	0	0	0
25	Bruce Gardiner‡	RW	10	0	3	3	1	4	—	—	—	—	—	—
23	Yves Sarault	LW	11	0	2	2	−3	7	—	—	—	—	—	—
16	Steve Martins‡	C	2	1	0	1	−1	0	—	—	—	—	—	—
35	Tom Barrasso†	G	7	0	0	0		0	6	0	0	0		2
25	Vyacheslav Butsayev†	C	3	0	0	0	−2	0	—	—	—	—	—	—
2	Bobby Dollas†‡	D	1	0	0	0	2	0	—	—	—	—	—	—
38	John Emmons	C	10	0	0	0	−2	6	—	—	—	—	—	—
30	Mike Fountain	G	1	0	0	0		0	—	—	—	—	—	—
59	Erich Goldmann	D	1	0	0	0	0	0	—	—	—	—	—	—
24	John Gruden	D	9	0	0	0	0	4	—	—	—	—	—	—
1	Jani Hurme	G	1	0	0	0		0	—	—	—	—	—	—
40	Patrick Lalime	G	38	0	0	0		4	—	—	—	—	—	—
44	Karel Rachunek	D	6	0	0	0	0	2	—	—	—	—	—	—
31	Ron Tugnutt‡	G	44	0	0	0		0	—	—	—	—	—	—
52	David Van Drunen	D	1	0	0	0	0	0	—	—	—	—	—	—

=== Goaltending ===
- † = Joined team via a transaction (e.g., trade, waivers, signing) during the season. Stats reflect time with the Senators only.
- ‡ = Left team via a transaction (e.g., trade, waivers, release) during the season. Stats reflect time with the Senators only.

No.	Player	Regular season										Playoffs								
No.	Player	GP	W	L	T	SA	GA	GAA	SV%	SO	TOI	GP	W	L	SA	GA	GAA	SV%	SO	TOI
40	Patrick Lalime	38	19	14	3	834	79	2.33	.905	3	2038	—	—	—	—	—	—	—	—	—
31	Ron Tugnutt‡	44	18	12	8	1020	103	2.54	.899	4	2435	—	—	—	—	—	—	—	—	—
35	Tom Barrasso†	7	3	4	0	182	22	3.16	.879	0	418	6	2	4	168	16	2.58	.905	0	372
1	Jani Hurme	1	1	0	0	19	2	2.00	.895	0	60	—	—	—	—	—	—	—	—	—
30	Mike Fountain	1	0	0	0	6	1	3.75	.833	0	16	—	—	—	—	—	—	—	—	—

== Awards and records ==
=== Awards ===
Type	Award/honour	Recipient	Ref
League (in-season)	NHL All-Star Game selection	Radek Bonk	
Team	Molson Cup	Marian Hossa	

=== Milestones ===
Milestone	Player	Date	Ref
First game	Mike Fisher	October 2, 1999	
First game	Karel Rachunek	October 31, 1999	
First game	Erich Goldmann	November 11, 1999	
First game	David Van Drunen	December 13, 1999	
First game	Petr Schastlivy	January 3, 2000	
First game	John Emmons	January 6, 2000	
First game	Jani Hurme	April 9, 2000	
1,000th game played	Kevin Dineen	October 21, 1999	

== Transactions ==
=== Trades ===
June 18, 1999	To Mighty Ducks of Anaheim Antti-Jussi Niemi; Ted Donato	To Ottawa Senators Patrick Lalime
June 18, 1999	To Atlanta Thrashers Damian Rhodes	To Ottawa Senators future considerations
June 30, 1999	To Tampa Bay Lightning Rick Dudley; Andreas Johansson	To Ottawa Senators Rob Zamuner; Tampa's second-round pick 2002 Draft (later traded)
November 11, 1999	To Tampa Bay Lightning Bruce Gardiner	To Ottawa Senators Colin Forbes
March 8, 2000	To Tampa Bay Lightning future considerations	To Ottawa Senators Jeff Shevalier
March 14, 1999	To Pittsburgh Penguins Ron Tugnutt; Janne Laukkanen	To Ottawa Senators Tom Barrasso
March 18, 2000	To Quebec (AHL) Jeff Shevalier (loan)	To Ottawa Senators Jason McBain

=== Waivers ===
September 27, 1999	To Tampa Bay Lightning Vyacheslav Butsayev
October 28, 1999	To Ottawa Senators Vyacheslav Butsayev (assigned to Grand Rapids)
October 29, 1999	To Tampa Bay Lightning Steve Martins
November 11, 1999	To Calgary Flames Bobby Dollas

=== Expansion draft ===
June 25, 1998	To Atlanta Thrashers Phil Crowe

Source: Ottawa Senators 2008–09 Media Guide. Ottawa Senators. 2008. p. 188.

== Draft picks ==
Ottawa's draft picks at the 1999 NHL entry draft in Boston, Massachusetts.

Round	#	Player	Nationality	College/Junior/Club team (League)
1	26	Martin Havlat	Czech Republic	Ocelari Trinec (Czech Extraliga)
2	48	Simon Lajeunesse	Canada	Moncton Wildcats (QMJHL)
2	62	Teemu Sainomaa	Finland	Jokerit (SM-liiga)
3	94	Chris Kelly	Canada	London Knights (OHL)
5	154	Andrew Ianiero	Canada	Kingston Frontenacs (OHL)
6	164	Martin Prusek	Czech Republic	HC Vitkovice (Czech Extraliga)
7	201	Mikko Ruutu	Finland	HIFK (SM-liiga)
7	209	Layne Ulmer	Canada	Swift Current Broncos (WHL)
7	213	Alexandre Giroux	Canada	Hull Olympiques (QMJHL)
9	269	Konstantin Gorovikov	Russia	SKA Saint Petersburg (Russia)

== Farm teams ==
=== Grand Rapids Griffins ===
The Senators began a new affiliation with the Grand Rapids Griffins of the International Hockey League in the 1999–2000 season. The head coach of the club was Guy Charron.

The Griffins finished in first place in the Eastern Conference with a 51–22–9 record, earning 111 points. In the playoffs, Grand Rapids defeated the Cleveland Lumberjacks and Cincinnati Cyclones before losing to the Chicago Wolves in the Fred A. Huber Trophy finals.

Michel Picard led the team with 33 goals and 68 points. Chris Neil led the club with 301 penalty minutes. Jani Hurme finished the season with a 29–15–4 record with a 2.18 GAA and a .921 save percentage. Charron was awarded the Commissioner's Trophy as IHL Coach of the Year. In the playoffs, Kevin Miller led the club with 11 goals and 18 points, while Hurme posted a 10–7 record with a 2.16 GAA and a .924 save percentage.

=== Mobile Mysticks ===
The Senators began a new affiliation with the Mobile Mysticks of the ECHL in the 1999–2000 season. The head coach of the club was Jeff Pyle.

The Mysticks finished the season with a 40–28–2 record, earning 82 points and second place in the Southwest Division, qualifying for the playoffs. In the post-season, Mobile lost to the Greenville Grrrowl in the conference quarter-finals.

Mark Turner led the club with 45 goals, which ranked third in the ECHL, while Jason Elders led the team with 88 points. Chad Alban had a 25–13–1 record with a 2.93 GAA and a .914 save percentage. In the post-season, Elders and Bobby Stewart co-led the team with three goals, while Elders, Stewart and Turner each recorded six points.

== See also ==
- 1999–2000 NHL season
