= 1999–2000 Boston Bruins season =

NHL team season

1999–2000 Boston Bruins
- Division: 5th Northeast
- Conference: 12th Eastern
- 1999–2000 record: 24–33–19–6
- Home record: 12–17–11–1
- Road record: 12–16–8–5
- Goals for: 210
- Goals against: 248

Team information
- General manager: Harry Sinden
- Coach: Pat Burns
- Captain: Ray Bourque (Oct.–Mar.); Vacant (Mar.–Apr.)
- Arena: Fleet Center
- Average attendance: 16,322
- Minor league affiliate: Providence Bruins (AHL)

Team leaders
- Goals: Joe Thornton (23)
- Assists: Joe Thornton (37)
- Points: Joe Thornton (60)
- Penalty minutes: Joe Thornton (82)
- Plus/minus: Anson Carter (+8)
- Wins: Byron Dafoe (13)
- Goals against average: John Grahame (2.46)

The 1999–2000 Boston Bruins season was the team's 76th season of operation. The Bruins failed to qualify for the 2000 Stanley Cup playoffs for the first time since 1996–97 season.

== Off-season ==
Following a second-round loss to the Buffalo Sabres the year previous, the Bruins headed into the 1999–2000 season with confidence that they could reach the playoffs for the third straight year under head coach Pat Burns. General manager Harry Sinden signed no free agents in the offseason and made no significant moves heading into the season. Goaltender Byron Dafoe was to be the starter for the third straight year following his best season in 1998–99, going 32–23–11 with a .926 save percentage.

== Regular season ==
The Bruins played the first month of the season without star goaltender Byron Dafoe, who held out after becoming embroiled in a bitter contract dispute with general manager Harry Sinden. Dafoe's absence hurt Boston, who stumbled out of the gate to a 0-5-4 record. After Dafoe's return to the team, the Bruins would regroup to win eight of ten, and improved their record to 11-8-6 by the end of November, after which the team began a steep decline. Center Jason Allison, the team's leading point-scorer the previous season, was hampered by wrist and thumb injuries, and elected to undergo season-ending surgery in January. Dafoe himself saw his effectiveness limited by a worsening knee injury which would cause him to miss the final two months of the season, and in February, forward Anson Carter suffered two separate injuries of his own, which would sideline him for the final 17 games.

On February 21st, the club was further demoralized when defenseman Marty McSorley swung his stick and hit Donald Brashear in the head with seconds left during a game against the Vancouver Canucks. Brashear lost consciousness and suffered a grade 3 concussion, but not from immediate contact with the stick. The stick hit Brashear's helmet, but caused him to fall backward, and his head hit hard on the ice.

As a result of the stick incident, McSorley was charged with assault and suspended by the NHL for the remainder of the 1999–2000 season (including playoffs) missing 23 games. On October 4, 2000, a jury found McSorley guilty of assault with a weapon for his attack on Brashear. He was sentenced to 18 months probation. The trial was the first for an on-ice attack by an NHL player since 1988. After his assault conviction, his NHL suspension was extended to one full year (through February 21, 2001). At the time, this was the longest suspension in NHL history. McSorley's contract expired during the suspension and he never played in another NHL game.

In March, with the Bruins well out of playoff contention, the team received a final blow when 21 year-veteran defenseman Ray Bourque requested — and received – a trade to the Colorado Avalanche. Bourque would go on to win the 2001 Stanley Cup as a member of the Avalanche the following season.

During the regular season, the Bruins were the only team not to score a short-handed goal.

=== Final standings ===
Northeast Division
No.	CR		GP	W	L	T	OTL	GF	GA	Pts
1	3	**Toronto Maple Leafs**	82	45	27	7	3	246	222	100
2	6	**Ottawa Senators**	82	41	28	11	2	244	210	95
3	8	**Buffalo Sabres**	82	35	32	11	4	213	204	85
4	10	Montreal Canadiens	82	35	34	9	4	196	194	83
5	11	Boston Bruins	82	24	33	19	6	210	248	73

Note: CR = Conference rank; GP = Games played; W = Wins; L = Losses; T = Ties; GF = Goals for; GA = Goals against; Pts = Points
Bolded teams qualified for the playoffs.

Eastern Conference
R		Div	GP	W	L	T	OTL	GF	GA	Pts
**1**	**z – Philadelphia Flyers**	**AT**	**82**	**45**	**22**	**12**	**3**	**237**	**179**	105
**2**	**y – Washington Capitals**	**SE**	**82**	**44**	**24**	**12**	**2**	**227**	**194**	102
**3**	**y – Toronto Maple Leafs**	**NE**	**82**	**45**	**27**	**7**	**3**	**246**	**222**	100
**4**	**New Jersey Devils**	**AT**	**82**	**45**	**24**	**8**	**5**	**251**	**203**	103
**5**	**Florida Panthers**	**SE**	**82**	**43**	**27**	**6**	**6**	**244**	**209**	98
**6**	**Ottawa Senators**	**NE**	**82**	**41**	**28**	**11**	**2**	**244**	**210**	95
**7**	**Pittsburgh Penguins**	**AT**	**82**	**37**	**31**	**8**	**6**	**241**	**236**	88
**8**	**Buffalo Sabres**	**NE**	**82**	**35**	**32**	**11**	**4**	**213**	**204**	85
8.5
9	Carolina Hurricanes	SE	82	37	35	10	0	217	216	84
10	Montreal Canadiens	NE	82	35	34	9	4	196	194	83
11	New York Rangers	AT	82	29	38	12	3	218	246	73
12	Boston Bruins	NE	82	24	33	19	6	210	248	73
13	New York Islanders	AT	82	24	48	9	1	194	275	58
14	Tampa Bay Lightning	SE	82	19	47	9	7	204	310	54
15	Atlanta Thrashers	SE	82	14	57	7	4	170	313	39

Divisions: AT – Atlantic, NE – Northeast, SE – Southeast

bold – Qualified for playoffs; z – Won conference; y – Won division

== Schedule and results ==
1999–2000 regular season
October: 4–5–4–0 (home: 2–1–2–0; road: 2–4–2–0)

Game	Date	Score	Opponent	Record	Recap
1	October 2, 1999	1–3	Carolina Hurricanes (1999–2000)	0–1–0–0	L
2	October 4, 1999	0–4	@ Toronto Maple Leafs (1999–2000)	0–2–0–0	L
3	October 7, 1999	3–4	@ Ottawa Senators (1999–2000)	0–3–0–0	L
4	October 9, 1999	1–1 OT	Philadelphia Flyers (1999–2000)	0–3–1–0	T
5	October 11, 1999	3–3 OT	Colorado Avalanche (1999–2000)	0–3–2–0	T
6	October 13, 1999	1–2	@ Colorado Avalanche (1999–2000)	0–4–2–0	L
7	October 15, 1999	2–2 OT	@ Dallas Stars (1999–2000)	0–4–3–0	T
8	October 16, 1999	1–2	@ Phoenix Coyotes (1999–2000)	0–5–3–0	L
9	October 20, 1999	2–2 OT	@ Los Angeles Kings (1999–2000)	0–5–4–0	T
10	October 23, 1999	3–1	@ San Jose Sharks (1999–2000)	1–5–4–0	W
11	October 24, 1999	3–2	@ Mighty Ducks of Anaheim (1999–2000)	2–5–4–0	W
12	October 28, 1999	7–3	Tampa Bay Lightning (1999–2000)	3–5–4–0	W
13	October 30, 1999	3–0	Buffalo Sabres (1999–2000)	4–5–4–0	W

November: 7–3–2–0 (home: 4–2–1–0; road: 3–1–1–0)

Game	Date	Score	Opponent	Record	Recap
14	November 4, 1999	3–1	New Jersey Devils (1999–2000)	5–5–4–0	W
15	November 6, 1999	4–2	Atlanta Thrashers (1999–2000)	6–5–4–0	W
16	November 10, 1999	2–6	@ Buffalo Sabres (1999–2000)	6–6–4–0	L
17	November 11, 1999	4–3 OT	Toronto Maple Leafs (1999–2000)	7–6–4–0	W
18	November 13, 1999	5–2	@ New York Rangers (1999–2000)	8–6–4–0	W
19	November 17, 1999	2–2 OT	@ New Jersey Devils (1999–2000)	8–6–5–0	T
20	November 18, 1999	5–3	New York Rangers (1999–2000)	9–6–5–0	W
21	November 20, 1999	0–3	Washington Capitals (1999–2000)	9–7–5–0	L
22	November 22, 1999	2–1	@ Carolina Hurricanes (1999–2000)	10–7–5–0	W
23	November 24, 1999	5–2	@ Nashville Predators (1999–2000)	11–7–5–0	W
24	November 26, 1999	2–2 OT	Vancouver Canucks (1999–2000)	11–7–6–0	T
25	November 28, 1999	1–2	New York Islanders (1999–2000)	11–8–6–0	L

December: 2–6–3–2 (home: 1–3–2–0; road: 1–3–1–2)

Game	Date	Score	Opponent	Record	Recap
26	December 2, 1999	2–2 OT	@ Washington Capitals (1999–2000)	11–8–7–0	T
27	December 4, 1999	3–9	Chicago Blackhawks (1999–2000)	11–9–7–0	L
28	December 9, 1999	2–2 OT	Edmonton Oilers (1999–2000)	11–9–8–0	T
29	December 11, 1999	4–5	Detroit Red Wings (1999–2000)	11–10–8–0	L
30	December 13, 1999	2–0	Phoenix Coyotes (1999–2000)	12–10–8–0	W
31	December 14, 1999	2–4	@ Pittsburgh Penguins (1999–2000)	12–11–8–0	L
32	December 17, 1999	3–1	@ Atlanta Thrashers (1999–2000)	13–11–8–0	W
33	December 18, 1999	0–4	@ St. Louis Blues (1999–2000)	13–12–8–0	L
34	December 21, 1999	1–3	Nashville Predators (1999–2000)	13–13–8–0	L
35	December 23, 1999	3–3 OT	Montreal Canadiens (1999–2000)	13–13–9–0	T
36	December 27, 1999	0–3	@ New York Islanders (1999–2000)	13–14–9–0	L
37	December 29, 1999	4–5 OT	@ New Jersey Devils (1999–2000)	13–14–9–1	OTL
38	December 30, 1999	4–5 OT	@ Ottawa Senators (1999–2000)	13–14–9–2	OTL

January: 4–4–4–2 (home: 1–4–3–1; road: 3–0–1–1)

Game	Date	Score	Opponent	Record	Recap
39	January 1, 2000	2–2 OT	New Jersey Devils (1999–2000)	13–14–10–2	T
40	January 4, 2000	7–3	@ New York Islanders (1999–2000)	14–14–10–2	W
41	January 6, 2000	3–7	Carolina Hurricanes (1999–2000)	14–15–10–2	L
42	January 8, 2000	2–5	New York Islanders (1999–2000)	14–16–10–2	L
43	January 11, 2000	2–3	Toronto Maple Leafs (1999–2000)	14–17–10–2	L
44	January 13, 2000	0–0 OT	Buffalo Sabres (1999–2000)	14–17–11–2	T
45	January 15, 2000	2–2 OT	@ Montreal Canadiens (1999–2000)	14–17–12–2	T
46	January 17, 2000	3–3 OT	Atlanta Thrashers (1999–2000)	14–17–13–2	T
47	January 19, 2000	4–3	@ Atlanta Thrashers (1999–2000)	15–17–13–2	W
48	January 20, 2000	4–2	@ Tampa Bay Lightning (1999–2000)	16–17–13–2	W
49	January 22, 2000	3–4 OT	@ Florida Panthers (1999–2000)	16–17–13–3	OTL
50	January 24, 2000	3–4 OT	Calgary Flames (1999–2000)	16–17–13–4	OTL
51	January 29, 2000	1–0	Buffalo Sabres (1999–2000)	17–17–13–4	W
52	January 31, 2000	2–4	Mighty Ducks of Anaheim (1999–2000)	17–18–13–4	L

February: 2–5–4–0 (home: 1–2–1–0; road: 1–3–3–0)

Game	Date	Score	Opponent	Record	Recap
53	February 1, 2000	4–4 OT	@ Ottawa Senators (1999–2000)	17–18–14–4	T
54	February 3, 2000	4–2	Toronto Maple Leafs (1999–2000)	18–18–14–4	W
55	February 8, 2000	2–2 OT	Washington Capitals (1999–2000)	18–18–15–4	T
56	February 11, 2000	2–5	@ New York Rangers (1999–2000)	18–19–15–4	L
57	February 12, 2000	1–5	Florida Panthers (1999–2000)	18–20–15–4	L
58	February 16, 2000	3–3 OT	@ Toronto Maple Leafs (1999–2000)	18–20–16–4	T
59	February 21, 2000	2–5	@ Vancouver Canucks (1999–2000)	18–21–16–4	L
60	February 23, 2000	2–4	@ Edmonton Oilers (1999–2000)	18–22–16–4	L
61	February 25, 2000	3–0	@ Washington Capitals (1999–2000)	19–22–16–4	W
62	February 26, 2000	2–2 OT	@ Pittsburgh Penguins (1999–2000)	19–22–17–4	T
63	February 29, 2000	3–5	Ottawa Senators (1999–2000)	19–23–17–4	L

March: 4–7–1–2 (home: 2–5–1–0; road: 2–2–0–2)

Game	Date	Score	Opponent	Record	Recap
64	March 2, 2000	2–5	Montreal Canadiens (1999–2000)	19–24–17–4	L
65	March 4, 2000	0–3	Philadelphia Flyers (1999–2000)	19–25–17–4	L
66	March 6, 2000	1–5	Ottawa Senators (1999–2000)	19–26–17–4	L
67	March 8, 2000	1–2 OT	@ Buffalo Sabres (1999–2000)	19–26–17–5	OTL
68	March 10, 2000	5–3	@ Carolina Hurricanes (1999–2000)	20–26–17–5	W
69	March 11, 2000	5–3	@ Montreal Canadiens (1999–2000)	21–26–17–5	W
70	March 16, 2000	4–5 OT	@ Chicago Blackhawks (1999–2000)	21–26–17–6	OTL
71	March 18, 2000	3–2	Pittsburgh Penguins (1999–2000)	22–26–17–6	W
72	March 19, 2000	2–6	@ Philadelphia Flyers (1999–2000)	22–27–17–6	L
73	March 21, 2000	4–0	Tampa Bay Lightning (1999–2000)	23–27–17–6	W
74	March 23, 2000	1–3	Florida Panthers (1999–2000)	23–28–17–6	L
75	March 25, 2000	4–4 OT	Los Angeles Kings (1999–2000)	23–28–18–6	T
76	March 29, 2000	3–4	@ Montreal Canadiens (1999–2000)	23–29–18–6	L
77	March 30, 2000	2–3	St. Louis Blues (1999–2000)	23–30–18–6	L

April: 1–3–1–0 (home: 1–0–1–0; road: 0–3–0–0)

Game	Date	Score	Opponent	Record	Recap
78	April 1, 2000	2–2 OT	New York Rangers (1999–2000)	23–30–19–6	T
79	April 4, 2000	4–5	@ Tampa Bay Lightning (1999–2000)	23–31–19–6	L
80	April 5, 2000	3–6	@ Florida Panthers (1999–2000)	23–32–19–6	L
81	April 8, 2000	0–3	@ Philadelphia Flyers (1999–2000)	23–33–19–6	L
82	April 9, 2000	3–1	Pittsburgh Penguins (1999–2000)	24–33–19–6	W

Legend: W Win (2 points) L Loss (0 points) T Tie (1 point) OTL Overtime loss (1 point)

== Player statistics ==
=== Scoring ===
- Position abbreviations: C = Center; D = Defense; G = Goaltender; LW = Left wing; RW = Right wing
- † = Joined team via a transaction (e.g., trade, waivers, signing) during the season. Stats reflect time with the Bruins only.
- ‡ = Left team via a transaction (e.g., trade, waivers, release) during the season. Stats reflect time with the Bruins only.

No.	Player	Pos	Regular season					
No.	Player	Pos	GP	G	A	Pts	+/-	PIM
6	Joe Thornton	C	81	23	37	60	−5	82
33	Anson Carter	RW	59	22	25	47	8	14
14	Sergei Samsonov	LW	77	19	26	45	−6	4
77	Ray Bourque‡	D	65	10	28	38	−11	20
38	Dave Andreychuk‡	LW	63	19	14	33	−11	28
41	Jason Allison	C	37	10	18	28	5	20
20	Darren Van Impe	D	79	5	23	28	−19	73
11	P. J. Axelsson	LW	81	10	16	26	1	24
23	Steve Heinze	RW	75	12	13	25	−8	36
19	Rob DiMaio‡	RW	50	5	16	21	−1	42
28	Andre Savage	C	43	7	13	20	−8	10
18	Kyle McLaren	D	71	8	11	19	−4	67
22	Mikko Eloranta	LW	50	6	12	18	−10	36
43	Joe Murphy†‡	RW	26	7	7	14	−7	41
32	Don Sweeney	D	81	1	13	14	−14	48
10	Cameron Mann	RW	32	8	4	12	−6	13
17	Shawn Bates	C	44	5	7	12	−17	14
25	Hal Gill	D	81	3	9	12	0	51
21	Eric Nickulas	RW	20	5	6	11	−1	12
57	Antti Laaksonen	LW	27	6	3	9	3	2
12	Brian Rolston†	LW	16	5	4	9	−4	6
37	Mattias Timander	D	60	0	8	8	−11	22
26	Mike Knuble†	RW	14	3	3	6	−2	8
53	Brandon Smith	D	22	2	4	6	−4	10
29	Marty McSorley†	D	27	2	3	5	2	62
16	Ken Belanger	LW	37	2	2	4	−4	44
48	Joe Hulbig	LW	24	2	2	4	−8	8
51	Jay Henderson	LW	16	1	3	4	1	9
27	Landon Wilson	RW	40	1	3	4	−6	18
55	Jonathan Girard	D	23	1	2	3	−1	2
39	Joel Prpic	C	14	0	3	3	−6	0
61	Marquis Mathieu	C	6	0	2	2	−2	4
42	Peter Ferraro	LW	5	0	1	1	−1	0
47	John Grahame	G	24	0	1	1		8
46	Sean Pronger	C	11	0	1	1	−4	13
49	Johnathan Aitken	D	3	0	0	0	−3	0
44	Nick Boynton	D	5	0	0	0	−5	0
34	Byron Dafoe	G	41	0	0	0		0
45	Aaron Downey	RW	1	0	0	0	0	0
35	Robbie Tallas	G	27	0	0	0		6
54	Jeff Zehr	LW	4	0	0	0	−1	2

=== Goaltending ===
No.	Player	Regular season									
No.	Player	GP	W	L	T	SA	GA	GAA	SV%	SO	TOI
34	Byron Dafoe	41	13	16	10	1030	114	2.96	.889	3	2307
47	John Grahame	24	7	10	5	609	55	2.46	.910	2	1344
35	Robbie Tallas	27	4	13	4	628	72	3.17	.885	0	1363

== Awards and records ==
=== Awards ===
Type	Award/honor	Recipient	Ref
League (in-season)	NHL All-Star Game selection	Ray Bourque	
Team	Elizabeth C. Dufresne Trophy	Joe Thornton	
Team	John P. Bucyk Award	Steve Heinze	
Team	Seventh Player Award	Joe Thornton	
Team	Three Stars Awards	Joe Thornton (1st)	
Team	Three Stars Awards	Kyle McLaren (2nd)	
Team	Three Stars Awards	Sergei Samsonov (3rd)	

=== Milestones ===
Milestone	Player	Date	Ref
First game	Mikko Eloranta	October 2, 1999	
First game	John Grahame	October 4, 1999	
First game	Jeff Zehr	November 20, 1999	
First game	Aaron Downey	March 30, 2000	
First game	Nick Boynton	April 1, 2000	
First game	Johnathan Aitken	April 5, 2000	

== Transactions ==
=== Trades ===
Date	Details	
June 25, 1999	To Atlanta Thrashers Randy Robitaille	To Boston Bruins Peter Ferraro
October 20, 1999	To Toronto Maple Leafs Right to match arbitration award of Dmitri Khristich	To Boston Bruins 2000 2nd-round pick (#59 overall)
December 28, 1999	To Edmonton Oilers Kay Whitmore	To Boston Bruins Mike Matteucci
March 6, 2000	To Colorado Avalanche Ray Bourque; Dave Andreychuk	To Boston Bruins Brian Rolston; Martin Grenier; Samuel Pahlsson; 2000 1st-round pick (#27 overall)
March 10, 2000	To New York Rangers Rob DiMaio	To Boston Bruins Mike Knuble

=== Free agents ===
Date	Player	Team	Contract term
June 21, 1999	Jeff Zehr		
July 15, 1999	Tim Taylor	to New York Rangers	
July 19, 1999	Joe Hulbig	from Edmonton Oilers	1-year
July 19, 1999	Vratislav Cech	from Florida Panthers	3-year
July 28, 1999	Terry Virtue	to New York Rangers	
July 28, 1999	Dave Andreychuk	from New Jersey Devils	1-year
August 13, 1999	Chris Taylor	to Buffalo Sabres	
August 25, 1999	Sean Pronger	from Los Angeles Kings	2-year
August 25, 1999	Kay Whitmore	from New York Rangers	2-year
October 20, 1999	Dave Ellett	to St. Louis Blues	
November 12, 1999	Joe Murphy	from San Jose Sharks	1-year
November 16, 1999	Grant Ledyard	to Ottawa Senators	multi-year
December 7, 1999	Marty McSorley	from Edmonton Oilers	1-year

=== Signings ===
Date	Player	Contract term
July 6, 1999	Mikko Eloranta	1-year
July 12, 1999	Robbie Tallas	1-year
July 19, 1999	Landon Wilson	2-year
August 25, 1999	Ken Belanger	2-year
August 25, 1999	Shawn Bates	1-year
September 2, 1999	Antti Laaksonen	1-year
September 2, 1999	John Grahame	1-year
September 2, 1999	Mattias Timander	2-year
September 12, 1999	Hal Gill	2-year
September 22, 1999	P. J. Axelsson	2-year
September 30, 1999	Nick Boynton	3-year
October 29, 1999	Byron Dafoe	3-year
January 6, 2000	Jason Allison	1-year extension through 2000-01
June 1, 2000	Andrew Raycroft	3-year

=== Waivers ===
Date	Player	Team
February 10, 2000	Joe Murphy	to Washington Capitals

=== Retirement ===
Date	Player
July 15, 1999	Scott Arniel

== Draft picks ==
Boston's draft picks at the 1999 NHL entry draft held at the FleetCenter in Boston, Massachusetts.

Round	#	Player	Position	Nationality	College/Junior/Club team (League)
1	21	Nick Boynton	D	Canada	Ottawa 67's (OHL)
2	56	Matt Zultek	LW	Canada	Ottawa 67's (OHL)
3	89	Kyle Wanvig	RW	Canada	Kootenay Ice (WHL)
4	118	Jaakko Harikkala	D	Finland	Lukko (Finland)
5	147	Seamus Kotyk	G	Canada	Ottawa 67's (OHL)
6	179	Don Choukalos	G	Canada	Regina Pats (WHL)
7	207	Greg Barber	RW	Canada	Victoria Salsa (BCJHL)
8	236	John Cronin	D	United States	Boston University (Hockey East)
9^{1}	247	Mikko Eloranta	LW	Finland	TPS (Finland)
9	264	Georgijs Pujacs	D	Latvia	Dynamo-81 Riga (Latvia)

Notes

1. The Bruins acquired this pick as the result of a trade on June 27, 1998 that sent a ninth-round pick in 1998 to the New York Islanders in exchange for this pick.
