= Nicklas Johansson =

Swedish ice hockey player

- Born: June 12, 1984 (age 40); Umeå, Sweden
- Height: 5 ft 11 in (180 cm)
- Weight: 192 lb (87 kg; 13 st 10 lb)
- Position: Forward
- Shoots: Left
- Allsvenskan team: IF Björklöven
- NHL draft: Undrafted
- Playing career: 2004–present

Nicklas Johansson (born June 12, 1984) is a Swedish professional ice hockey player. He is currently playing with IF Björklöven in the Swedish Allsvenskan.

On June 5, 2013, Johansson signed a two-year contract extension with IF Björklöven.
