= Brad Chartrand =

Canadian ice hockey player

- Born: December 14, 1974 (age 51) Winnipeg, Manitoba, Canada
- Height: 6 ft 0 in (183 cm)
- Weight: 184 lb (83 kg; 13 st 2 lb)
- Position: Right wing
- Shot: Left
- Played for: Los Angeles Kings; SC Rapperswil-Jona
- National team: Canada
- NHL draft: Undrafted
- Playing career: 1996–2004

Brad Chartrand (born December 14, 1974) is a Canadian former ice hockey right winger who had a five-year career in the National Hockey League with the Los Angeles Kings between 1999 and 2004. He played in 215 regular season games, scoring 25 goals and assists for 50 points, picking up 122 penalty minutes.

Chartrand was born in Winnipeg, Manitoba. Chartrand is the oldest of three siblings, and is oldest brother to Brazilian Jiu Jitsu Blue Belt M. Chartrand.

== Career statistics ==
=== Regular season and playoffs ===
			Regular season					Playoffs
Season	Team	League	GP	G	A	Pts	PIM	GP	G	A	Pts	PIM
1988–89	Winnipeg Hawks	MMHL	24	30	50	80	40	—	—	—	—	—
1989–90	Winnipeg Hawks	MMHL	24	26	55	81	40	—	—	—	—	—
1990–91	Winnipeg Hawks	MMHL	34	26	45	71	40	—	—	—	—	—
1991–92	St. James Canadians	MJHL	45	24	25	49	32	—	—	—	—	—
1992–93	Cornell University	ECAC	26	10	6	16	16	—	—	—	—	—
1993–94	Cornell University	ECAC	30	4	14	18	48	—	—	—	—	—
1994–95	Cornell University	ECAC	28	9	9	18	10	—	—	—	—	—
1995–96	Cornell University	ECAC	34	24	19	43	16	—	—	—	—	—
1996–97	Canadian National Team	Intl	54	10	14	24	42	—	—	—	—	—
1997–98	SC Rapperswil-Jona	NLA	8	3	2	5	4	—	—	—	—	—
1997–98	Canadian National Team	Intl	60	24	30	54	47	—	—	—	—	—
1998–99	St. John's Maple Leafs	AHL	64	16	14	30	48	5	0	2	2	2
1999–00	Los Angeles Kings	NHL	50	6	6	12	17	4	0	0	0	6
1999–00	Lowell Lock Monsters	AHL	16	5	10	15	8	—	—	—	—	—
1999–00	Long Beach Ice Dogs	IHL	1	0	0	0	0	4	0	0	0	0
2000–01	Los Angeles Kings	NHL	4	1	0	1	2	—	—	—	—	—
2000–01	Lowell Lock Monsters	AHL	72	17	34	51	44	4	0	1	1	8
2001–02	Los Angeles Kings	NHL	46	7	9	16	40	7	1	1	2	2
2001–02	Manchester Monarchs	NHL	22	10	12	22	31	—	—	—	—	—
2002–03	Los Angeles Kings	NHL	62	8	6	14	33	—	—	—	—	—
2003–04	Los Angeles Kings	NHL	53	3	4	7	30	—	—	—	—	—
AHL totals			174	48	70	118	131	9	0	3	3	10
NHL totals			215	25	25	50	122	11	1	1	2	8

Awards and achievements
Preceded by Ian Sharp	ECAC Hockey Best Defensive Forward; 1995–96	Succeeded by Joel Prpic
