= David Van Drunen =

Canadian ice hockey player

- Born: January 31, 1976 (age 50) Sherwood Park, Alberta, Canada
- Height: 6 ft 0 in (183 cm)
- Weight: 204 lb (93 kg; 14 st 8 lb)
- Position: Defence
- Shot: Right
- Played for: Ottawa Senators
- NHL draft: Undrafted
- Playing career: 1997–2011

David John Van Drunen (born January 31, 1976) is a Canadian former professional ice hockey defenceman. He played one game in the National Hockey League game for the Ottawa Senators during the 1999–00 season, on December 13, 1999 against the Toronto Maple Leafs. The rest of his career, which lasted from 1997 to 2011, was spent in various minor leagues.

== Career statistics ==
=== Regular season and playoffs ===
			Regular season					Playoffs
Season	Team	League	GP	G	A	Pts	PIM	GP	G	A	Pts	PIM
1991–92	Sherwood Park Flyers U15	AMBHL	31	0	29	29	154	—	—	—	—	—
1992–93	Sherwood Park Flyers U18	AMHL	32	3	16	19	114	—	—	—	—	—
1993–94	Prince Albert Raiders	WHL	63	3	10	13	95	—	—	—	—	—
1994–95	Prince Albert Raiders	WHL	71	2	14	16	132	15	3	4	7	26
1995–96	Prince Albert Raiders	WHL	70	10	23	33	172	18	1	5	6	37
1996–97	Prince Albert Raiders	WHL	72	18	47	65	218	4	0	4	4	24
1997–98	Baton Rouge Kingfish	ECHL	59	8	22	30	107	—	—	—	—	—
1997–98	Detroit Vipers	IHL	1	0	0	0	2	—	—	—	—	—
1997–98	Hershey Bears	AHL	5	0	0	0	2	—	—	—	—	—
1997–98	Portland Pirates	AHL	4	0	0	0	2	—	—	—	—	—
1998–99	Saginaw Gears	UHL	63	5	17	22	107	—	—	—	—	—
1998–99	Dayton Bombers	ECHL	9	2	4	6	12	4	0	0	0	12
1998–99	Cincinnati Cyclones	IHL	1	0	0	0	0	—	—	—	—	—
1999–00	Mobile Mysticks	ECHL	29	1	9	10	78	5	1	1	2	14
1999–00	Grand Rapids Griffins	IHL	36	0	6	6	76	1	0	0	0	2
1999–00	Ottawa Senators	NHL	1	0	0	0	0	—	—	—	—	—
2000–01	Mobile Mysticks	ECHL	33	2	18	20	52	—	—	—	—	—
2000–01	Grand Rapids Griffins	IHL	36	2	5	7	24	10	0	1	1	22
2001–02	Mobile Mysticks	ECHL	3	1	3	4	10	—	—	—	—	—
2001–02	Grand Rapids Griffins	AHL	48	2	2	4	56	5	0	0	0	14
2002–03	Grand Rapids Griffins	AHL	80	3	10	13	106	15	0	1	1	12
2003–04	Grand Rapids Griffins	AHL	80	2	7	9	104	4	0	0	0	8
2004–05	Muskegon Fury	UHL	76	2	19	21	130	17	0	3	3	28
2005–06	Muskegon Fury	UHL	75	7	24	31	195	12	0	4	4	8
2006–07	Muskegon Fury	UHL	74	2	16	18	138	11	0	5	5	16
2007–08	Muskegon Fury	IHL	73	4	18	22	169	6	0	2	2	10
2008–09	Odessa Jackalopes	CHL	51	4	14	18	104	13	1	3	4	16
2009–10	Odessa Jackalopes	CHL	54	2	13	15	80	13	1	4	5	22
2010–11	Odessa Jackalopes	CHL	22	3	6	9	58	—	—	—	—	—
UHL totals			288	16	76	92	570	40	0	12	12	52
NHL totals			1	0	0	0	0	—	—	—	—	—

== Awards and honours ==
Award	Year
WHL
East Second All-Star Team	1997

== See also ==
- List of players who played only one game in the NHL
