= Daniel Johansson (ice hockey) =

Swedish ice hockey player (born 1981)

- Born: July 5, 1981 (age 44) Umeå, Sweden
- Height: 6 ft 0 in (183 cm)
- Weight: 203 lb (92 kg; 14 st 7 lb)
- Position: Defence/Forward
- Shot: Left
- Played for: HockeyAllsvenskan; Bodens IK; Växjö Lakers; Björklöven; Sundsvall Hockey; Mariestad BoIS
- NHL draft: 125th overall, 1999; Los Angeles Kings
- Playing career: 2000–2012

Daniel Johansson (born July 5, 1981) is a Swedish former professional ice hockey player. He was selected by the Los Angeles Kings in the 4th round (125th overall) of the 1999 NHL entry draft.

Between 2000 and 2009, Johansson played 260 regular season games, mostly with the Växjö Lakers, in the Swedish HockeyAllsvenskan. He retired following the 2011-12 season spent with Mariestad BoIS HC, a Swedish Division 1 team.

== Personal information ==
His younger brother Nicklas Johansson (born June 13, 1984), plays hockey with IF Björklöven of HockeyAllsvenskan.

== Career statistics ==
			Regular season					Playoffs
Season	Team	League	GP	G	A	Pts	PIM	GP	G	A	Pts	PIM
1996–97	LN91	Division 3	—	—	—	—	—	—	—	—	—	—
1998–99	MoDo Hockey J20	J20 SuperElit	36	8	19	27	32	—	—	—	—	—
1999–00	MoDo Hockey J20	J20 SuperElit	35	11	21	32	34	2	1	1	2	0
2000–01	Bodens IK	Allsvenskan	36	4	3	7	10	6	0	0	0	0
2001–02	Bodens IK	Allsvenskan	37	2	3	5	10	—	—	—	—	—
2001–02	Växjö Lakers HC	Division 1	—	2	2	4	—	8	2	5	7	6
2002–03	Växjö Lakers HC	Division 1	—	8	16	24	—	10	1	3	4	4
2003–04	Växjö Lakers HC	Allsvenskan	46	6	8	14	6	5	0	0	0	0
2004–05	Växjö Lakers HC	Allsvenskan	42	5	9	14	30	2	0	1	1	0
2005–06	Växjö Lakers HC	HockeyAllsvenskan	12	0	0	0	4	—	—	—	—	—
2005–06	LN91	Division 1	13	13	19	32	16	—	—	—	—	—
2005–06	IF Björklöven J20	J20 SuperElit	1	0	0	0	0	—	—	—	—	—
2005–06	IF Björklöven	HockeyAllsvenskan	10	0	1	1	4	—	—	—	—	—
2006–07	IF Sundsvall Hockey	HockeyAllsvenskan	38	0	4	4	16	—	—	—	—	—
2007–08	Asplöven HC	Division 1	35	15	28	43	28	8	1	6	7	10
2008–09	Mariestad BoIS HC	HockeyAllsvenskan	39	3	9	12	16	—	—	—	—	—
2009–10	Mariestad BoIS HC	Division 1	40	9	25	34	22	—	—	—	—	—
2010–11	Mariestad BoIS HC	Division 1	41	3	22	25	24	—	—	—	—	—
2011–12	Mariestad BoIS HC	Division 1	41	3	13	16	30	—	—	—	—	—
Allsvenskan totals			161	17	23	40	56	13	0	1	1	0
HockeyAllsvenskan totals			99	3	14	17	40	—	—	—	—	—
