= Marcel Cousineau =

Canadian ice hockey player

- Born: April 30, 1973 (age 53) Delson, Quebec, Canada
- Height: 5 ft 9 in (175 cm)
- Weight: 180 lb (82 kg; 12 st 12 lb)
- Position: Goaltender
- Caught: Left
- Played for: Los Angeles Kings; New York Islanders; Toronto Maple Leafs; Cherepovets Severstal
- NHL draft: 62nd overall, 1991; Boston Bruins
- Playing career: 1993–2005

Marcel Cousineau (born April 30, 1973) is a Canadian former professional ice hockey player who played 26 games in the National Hockey League with the Toronto Maple Leafs, New York Islanders, and Los Angeles Kings between 1996 and 2000.

== Playing career ==
Cousineau was selected by the Boston Bruins in the third round of the 1991 NHL entry draft.

As a rookie, Cousineau was named to the Quebec Major Junior Hockey League All-Rookie Team.

Cousineau played professionally for the Toronto Maple Leafs (1996–98), New York Islanders (1998–99), Los Angeles Kings (1999–2000).

Between his starts in the NHL, Cousineau played in the American Hockey League, International Hockey League, Quebec Senior Hockey League, Ligue Nord-Américaine de Hockey and the Kontinental Hockey League.

== Career statistics ==
=== Regular season and playoffs ===
			Regular season									Playoffs
Season	Team	League	GP	W	L	T	MIN	GA	SO	GAA	SV%	GP	W	L	MIN	GA	SO	GAA	SV%
1989–90	Richelieu Riverains	QAAA	27	22	5	0	1618	104	0	3.83	—	4	1	3	238	126	0	4.29	—
1990–91	Beauport Harfangs	QMJHL	49	13	29	3	2739	196	1	4.29	.865	—	—	—	—	—	—	—	—
1991–92	Beauport Harfangs	QMJHL	67	26	32	5	3673	241	0	3.94	.869	—	—	—	—	—	—	—	—
1992–93	Beauport Harfangs	QMJHL	39	12	24	2	2227	165	0	4.44	.858	—	—	—	—	—	—	—	—
1992–93	Drummondville Voltigeurs	QMJHL	60	20	32	2	3298	225	0	4.09	.886	9	3	6	498	37	1	4.45	.879
1993–94	St. John's Maple Leafs	AHL	37	13	11	9	2015	118	0	3.51	.885	—	—	—	—	—	—	—	—
1994–95	St. John's Maple Leafs	AHL	58	22	27	6	3342	171	4	3.07	.905	3	0	3	179	9	0	3.01	.914
1995–96	St. John's Maple Leafs	AHL	62	21	26	13	3629	192	1	3.17	.904	4	1	3	258	11	0	2.56	.923
1996–97	Toronto Maple Leafs	NHL	13	3	5	1	566	31	1	3.29	.902	—	—	—	—	—	—	—	—
1996–97	St. John's Maple Leafs	AHL	19	7	8	3	1053	58	0	3.30	.899	11	6	5	658	28	0	2.55	.907
1997–98	Toronto Maple Leafs	NHL	2	0	0	0	17	0	0	0.00	1.000	—	—	—	—	—	—	—	—
1997–98	St. John's Maple Leafs	AHL	57	17	25	13	3306	167	1	3.03	.907	4	1	3	254	10	0	2.36	.933
1998–99	New York Islanders	NHL	6	0	4	0	293	14	0	2.87	.882	—	—	—	—	—	—	—	—
1998–99	Lowell Lock Monsters	AHL	53	26	17	7	3034	139	3	2.75	.910	3	0	3	186	13	0	4.20	.867
1999–00	Los Angeles Kings	NHL	5	1	1	1	171	6	0	2.11	.906	—	—	—	—	—	—	—	—
1999–00	Long Beach Ice Dogs	IHL	23	15	6	1	1328	62	0	2.80	.906	—	—	—	—	—	—	—	—
2000–01	Lowell Lock Monsters	AHL	37	15	20	2	2135	101	1	2.84	.905	1	0	1	58	4	0	4.10	.846
2001–02	Manchester Monarchs	AHL	28	10	12	2	1456	70	1	2.88	.904	1	—	—	—	—	—	—	—
2002–03	Severstal Cherepovets	RSL	34	18	8	4	2021	61	6	1.81	.926	10	5	3	561	20	2	2.14	.917
2002–03	Severstal Cherepovets-2	RUS-3	1	—	—	—	—	—	—	—	—	—	—	—	—	—	—	—	—
2003–04	Verdun Dragons	QSMHL	29	—	—	—	—	—	—	4.03	.885	—	—	—	—	—	—	—	—
2004–05	Mission de Sorel-Tracy	LNAH	52	—	—	—	—	—	—	—	—	—	—	—	—	—	—	—	—
2005–06	Mission de Sorel-Tracy	LNAH	5	—	—	—	—	—	—	—	—	—	—	—	—	—	—	—	—
NHL totals			26	4	10	1	1046	51	1	2.93	.900	—	—	—	—	—	—	—	—
