= Craig Charron =

American ice hockey player (1967–2010)

- Born: November 15, 1967; North Easton, Massachusetts, U.S.
- Died: October 19, 2010 (aged 42); Rochester, New York, U.S.
- Height: 5 ft 10 in (178 cm)
- Weight: 180 lb (82 kg; 12 st 12 lb)
- Position: Center
- Shot: Right
- Played for: Fredericton Canadiens; Cornwall Aces; Rochester Americans; Lowell Lock Monsters; St. John's Maple Leafs
- National team: United States
- NHL draft: 1989 NHL Supplemental Draft; Montreal Canadiens
- Playing career: 1990–2002

Craig Charron (November 15, 1967 – October 19, 2010) was an American professional ice hockey center from North Easton, Massachusetts. He attended the University of Massachusetts Lowell, where he played for four seasons and served as captain of the 1989-1990 team, finishing his collegiate career as the second-leading scorer in the program's Division I history with 64 goals in 142 career games.

He was drafted by the Montreal Canadiens in the 1989 NHL Supplemental Draft; however, he never appeared in a game in the National Hockey League. He was a prolific player in the American Hockey League for many seasons, and he was the highest-scoring player on the 1995–96 Rochester Americans team which won the Calder Cup.

At the time of his death, he was the coach of the Spencerport Rangers High School Hockey team. During his first season as head coach Spencerport had made many strides but lost to the eventual state champions Webster-Thomas in the second round of sectionals.

Charron died at age 42 on October 19, 2010, after a battle with stomach cancer. He was inducted into the Legends of Lowell Hall of Fame by UMass Lowell and honored at the Tsongas Center at the University of Massachusetts Lowell on October 22, 2010. He was the nephew of 1980 U.S. Olympic goalie Jim Craig.

== Career statistics ==
			Regular season					Playoffs
Season	Team	League	GP	G	A	Pts	PIM	GP	G	A	Pts	PIM
1986–87	University of Massachusetts Lowell	NCAA	36	11	16	27	48	—	—	—	—	—
1987–88	University of Massachusetts Lowell	NCAA	39	22	18	40	32	—	—	—	—	—
1988–89	University of Massachusetts Lowell	NCAA	32	14	21	35	32	—	—	—	—	—
1989–90	University of Massachusetts Lowell	NCAA	35	17	29	46	10	—	—	—	—	—
1990–91	Winston-Salem Thunderbirds	ECHL	30	11	16	27	10	—	—	—	—	—
1990–91	Fredericton Canadiens	AHL	24	2	5	7	4	5	0	3	3	0
1990–91	Albany Choppers	IHL	5	0	2	2	0	—	—	—	—	—
1991–92	Cincinnati Cyclones	ECHL	64	41	55	96	97	9	5	5	10	10
1992–93	Cincinnati Cyclones	IHL	27	6	8	14	8	—	—	—	—	—
1992–93	Birmingham Bulls	ECHL	23	9	17	26	18	—	—	—	—	—
1993–94	Olofströms IK	Division 2	37	49	47	96	66	—	—	—	—	—
1994–95	Dayton Bombers	ECHL	48	35	47	82	82	9	9	13	22	10
1994–95	Cornwall Aces	AHL	6	5	0	5	0	2	0	0	0	0
1994–95	Kalamazoo Wings	IHL	2	0	0	0	0	—	—	—	—	—
1994–95	Fort Wayne Komets	IHL	2	1	0	1	4	—	—	—	—	—
1995–96	Rochester Americans	AHL	72	43	52	95	79	19	7	10	17	12
1996–97	Rochester Americans	AHL	72	24	41	65	42	10	2	7	9	4
1997–98	Rochester Americans	AHL	75	25	53	78	51	4	1	1	2	0
1998–99	Lowell Lock Monsters	AHL	71	22	39	61	41	3	1	2	3	8
1999–00	St. John's Maple Leafs	AHL	32	11	18	29	14	—	—	—	—	—
1999–00	Lowell Lock Monsters	AHL	22	8	13	21	14	7	2	3	5	4
2000–01	Rochester Americans	AHL	73	18	32	50	53	4	0	1	1	2
2001–02	Rochester Americans	AHL	43	12	12	24	24	2	0	0	0	0
AHL totals			490	170	265	435	322	56	13	27	40	30
ECHL totals			165	96	135	231	207	18	14	18	32	20
