= Ilves =

Tampereen Ilves
- City: Tampere
- League: Liiga
- Founded: 1931
- Home arena: Nokia Arena (capacity: 13,455)
- Colours: Green, yellow, black
- Owner: Ilves-Hockey Oy
- General manager: Risto Jalo
- Head coach: Tommi Niemelä
- Captain: Eemeli Suomi
- Affiliates: KOOVEE; Ilves Naiset
- Farm club: Koovee
- Website: ilves.com
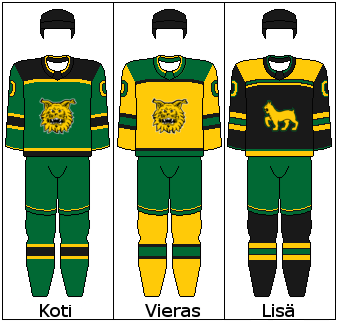

Championships
- Playoff championships: 1936, 1937, 1938, 1945, 1946, 1947, 1950, 1951, 1952, 1957, 1958, 1960, 1962, 1966, 1972, 1985

Tampereen Ilves, commonly known as Ilves, (pronounced [ˈilʋes]; Finnish for "Lynx") is a Finnish professional ice hockey team based in Tampere. They play in the Liiga at the Nokia Arena.

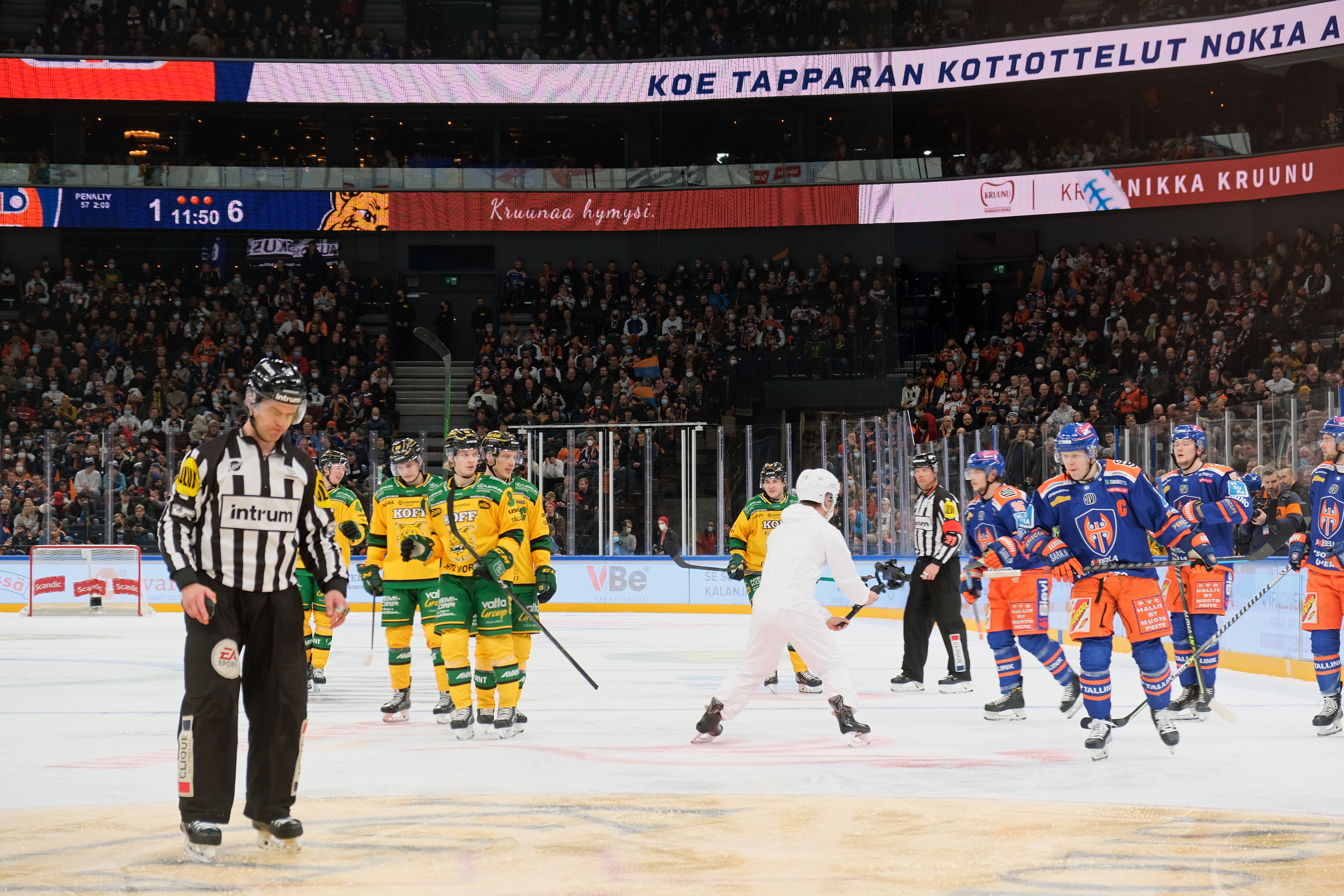
The match between Ilves (yellow and green) and Tappara (blue and orange) on December 3, 2021 at Nokia Arena in Tampere, Finland

The colors of Ilves, green, yellow, and black, were taken from what was then the coat of arms of the city of Tampere.

== History ==
With sixteen championships, Ilves is the second most successful hockey team in the Finnish championship league, the Liiga, after their local rival Tappara. The club was founded in the spring of 1931, and it played its first game against Tampereen Palloilijat the next winter. In the late 1930s, Ilves won three Finnish championship titles as the first Tampere-based hockey team.

After World War II, Ilves started playing its home games at the then new Koulukatu ice rink. It had another championship spree in 1945–1947 when it stayed undefeated for over four years (albeit playing only 36 games during that period).

In 1954, Ilves was for the first and so far only time relegated to the second highest level of Finnish hockey but managed to return to the top tier only one year later.

The current logo was designed by Rauno Broms in 1963. In 1965, Ilves moved, along with its local rivals Tappara and KooVee, to the new Hakametsä arena, where they played until 2021.

The last Finnish Cup competition in hockey was held in 1971. Ilves won the title and has therefore been the reigning champion since. In 1972, it also won another league championship; its 15th championship in total.

During the late 1970s, Ilves went through lean times. Finally, when Koovee, which was in no better condition, was relegated at the end of the 1979–80 season, the two clubs decided to sign an agreement of cooperation. The best players of Koovee moved to Ilves, the most notable of them being Risto Jalo.

In 1985, Ilves claimed its 16th and most recent championship. Along with Risto Jalo, the key players of that team were Raimo Helminen, Mikko Mäkelä, Ville Siren, and Jukka Tammi. Repeating this success proved difficult, however, when in the following summer four players left the team to play in the NHL.

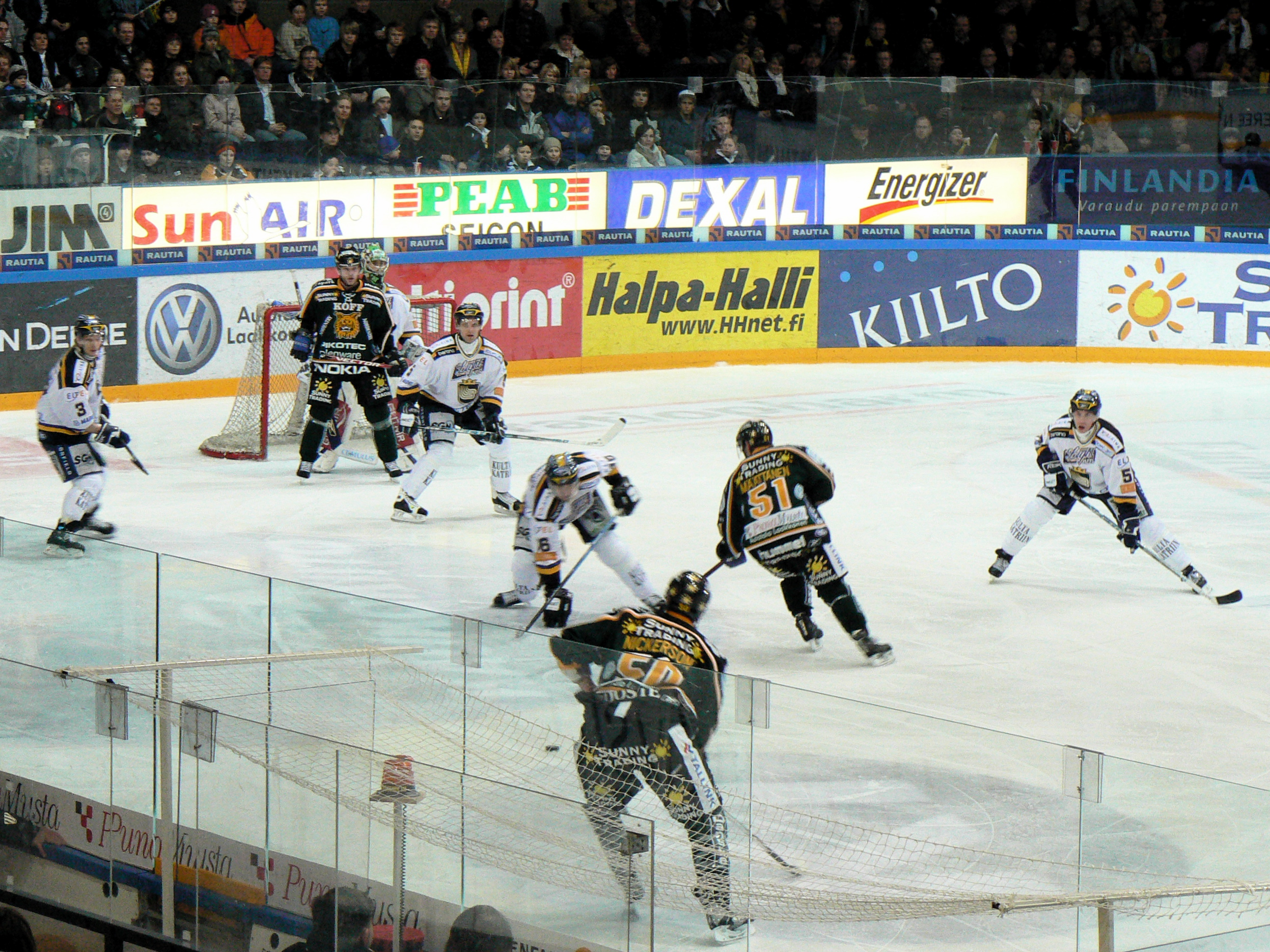
Ilves against Blues in 2008.

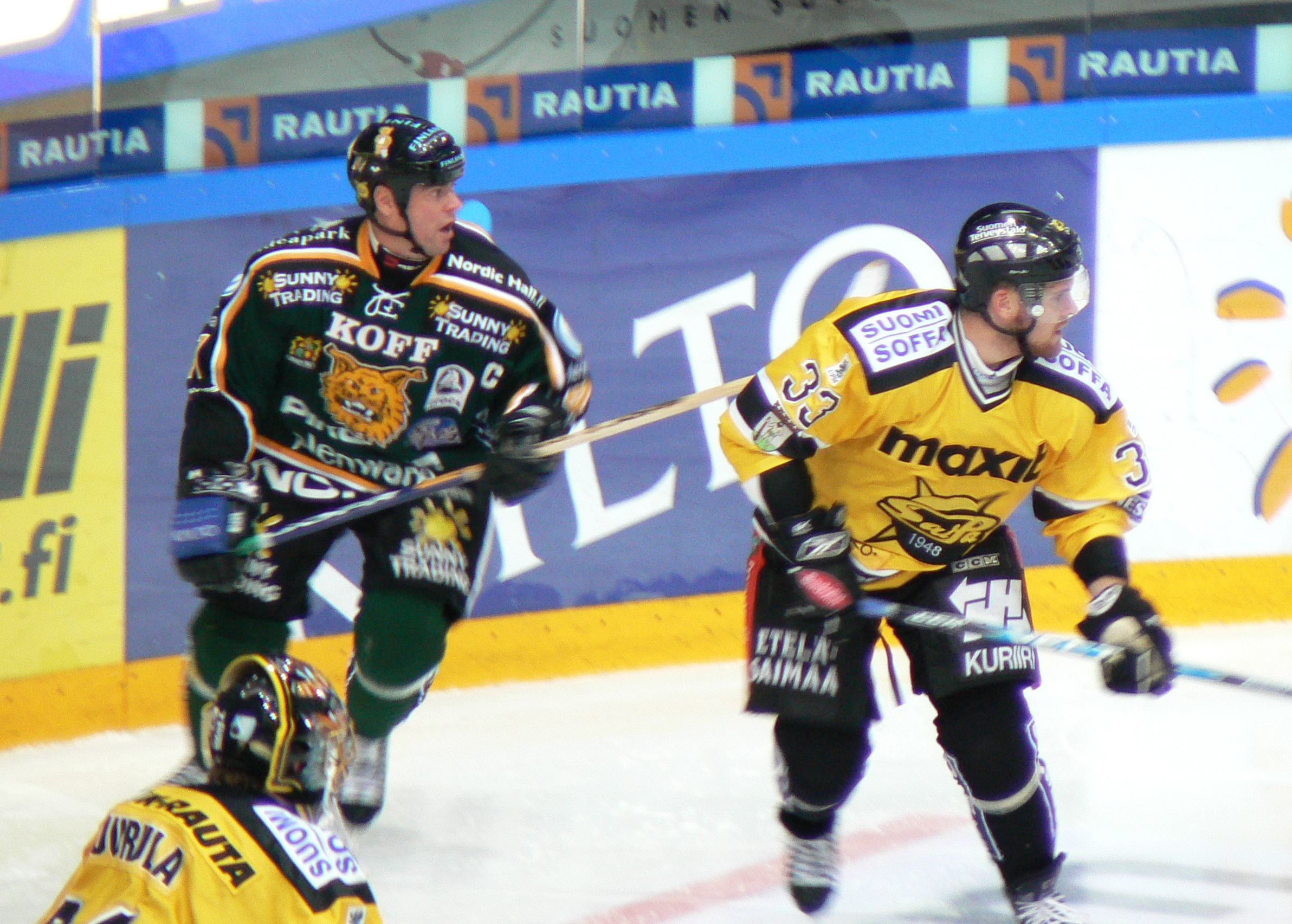
Raimo Helminen playing for Ilves in 2007.

In the late 1980s, Ilves had another brief stint of moderate success when coached by Sakari Pietilä. It finished first after the regular season in 1988 but was eliminated in the first round of playoffs. The next year it came away with a bronze medal, and finally in 1990 it reached the finals, only to lose to TPS.

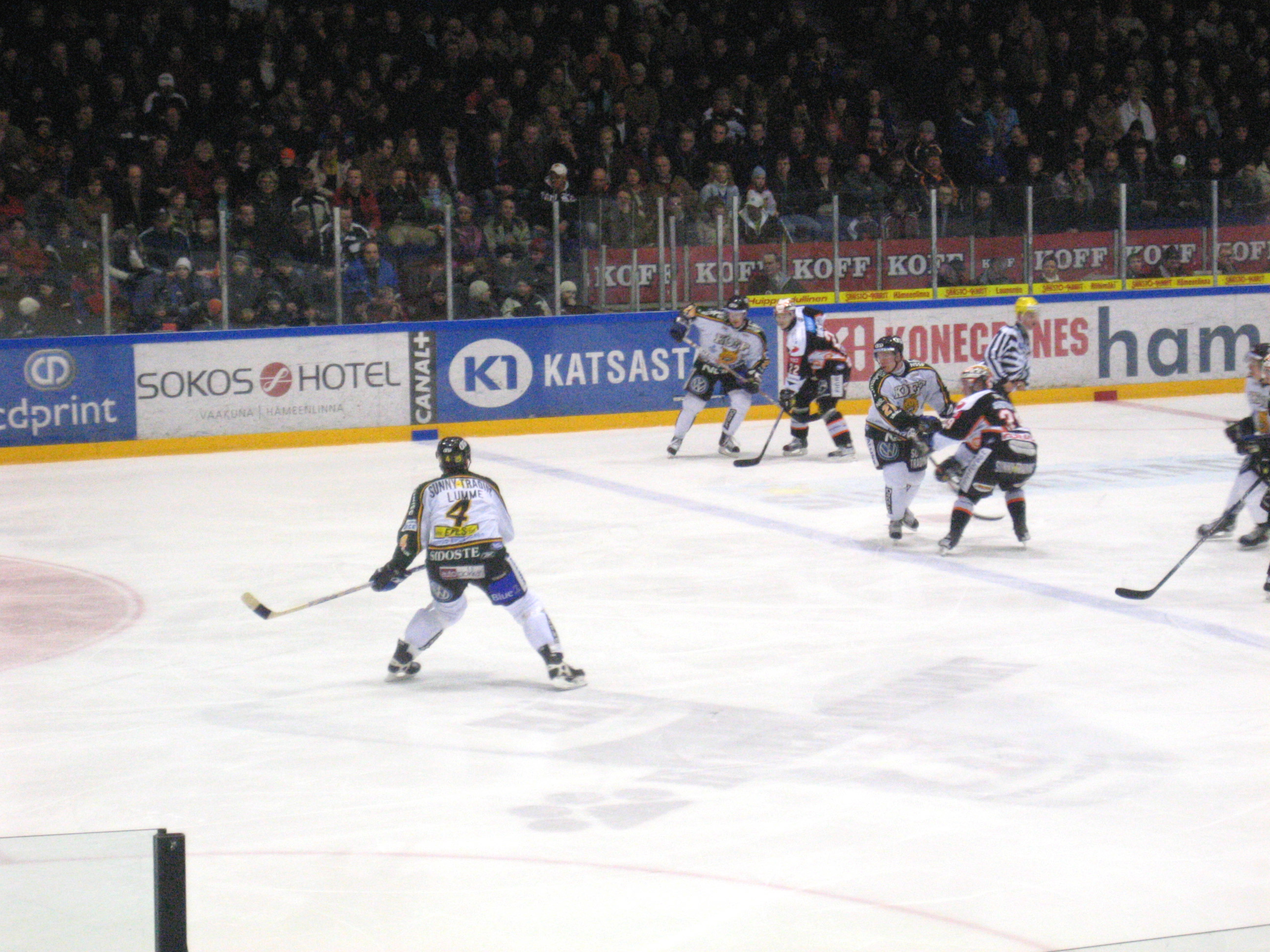
Ilves against HPK in March 2006.

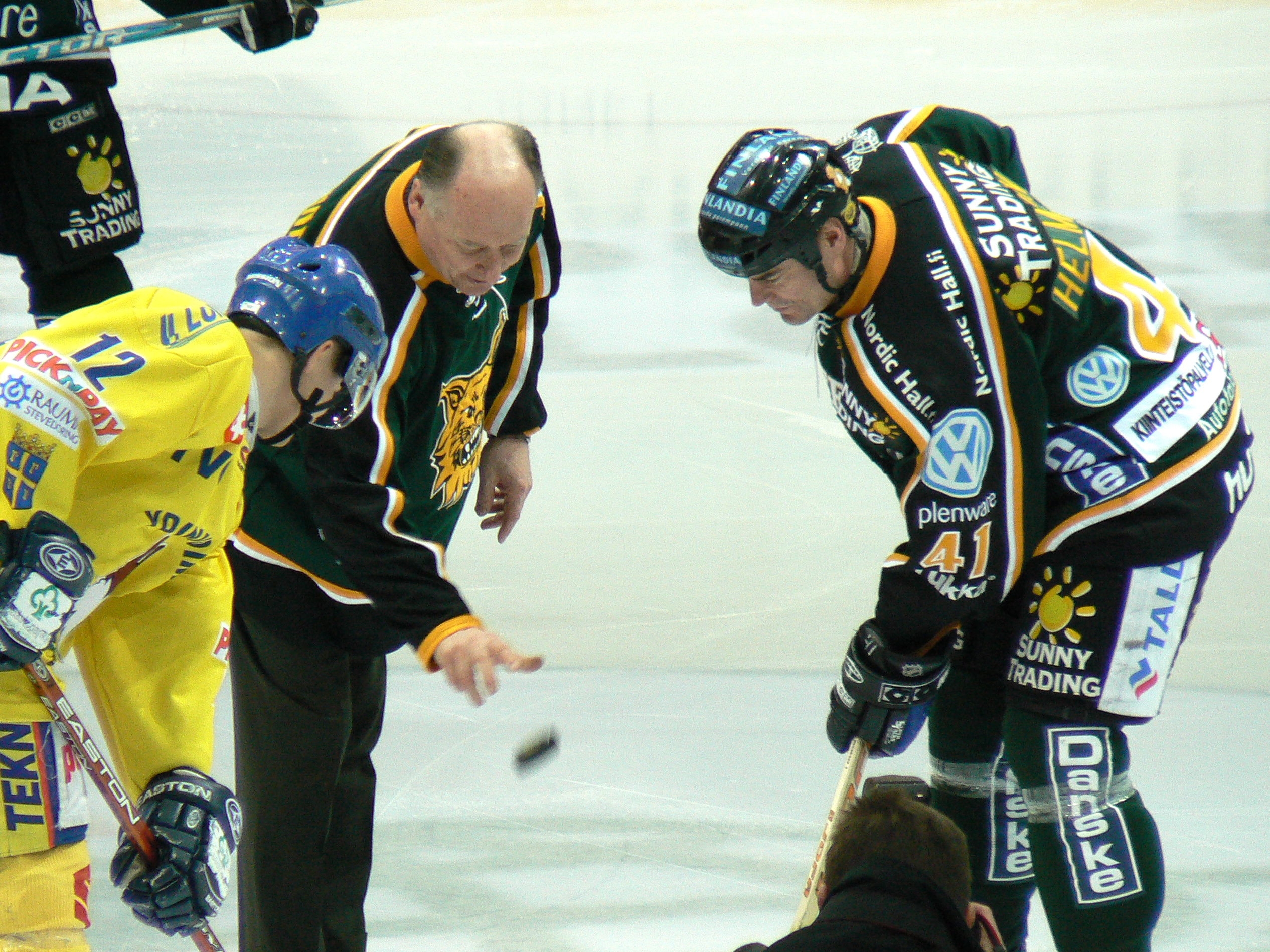
Raimo Helminen facing off against Lukko player Pekka Sarrenheimo in 2008.

For most of the 1990s, the club struggled with financial problems and unclear issues concerning ownership. In sports performance, the low point was in the spring of 1995, when Ilves finished last in the SM-liiga and had to fight the lower league teams SaPKo and SaiPa for their place among the elite for the next year.

Ilves managed to avoid relegation and was promptly reborn as a viable championship candidate, reaching the semifinals in 1997 and the finals a year after that.

The 2000s were a fairly mediocre period in Ilves history. After their bronze medal win in 2001, Ilves lost in the first round of the playoffs in six of the next seven seasons and missing the playoffs altogether in 2003. They managed to avoid relegation in 2010, 2012 and 2013.

== Honors ==
=== SM-sarja ===
- (gold) SM-sarja Aaro Kivilinna memorial award: 1936, 1937, 1938, 1945, 1946, 1947, 1950, 1951, 1952
- (gold) SM-sarja Kanada-malja: 1957, 1958, 1960, 1962, 1966, 1972
- (silver) SM-sarja Aaro Kivilinna memorial award: 1935, 1948, 1949
- (silver) SM-sarja Kanada-malja: 1965, 1968, 1969, 1970
- (bronze) SM-sarja Aaro Kivilinna memorial award: 1934, 1939, 1941, 1943
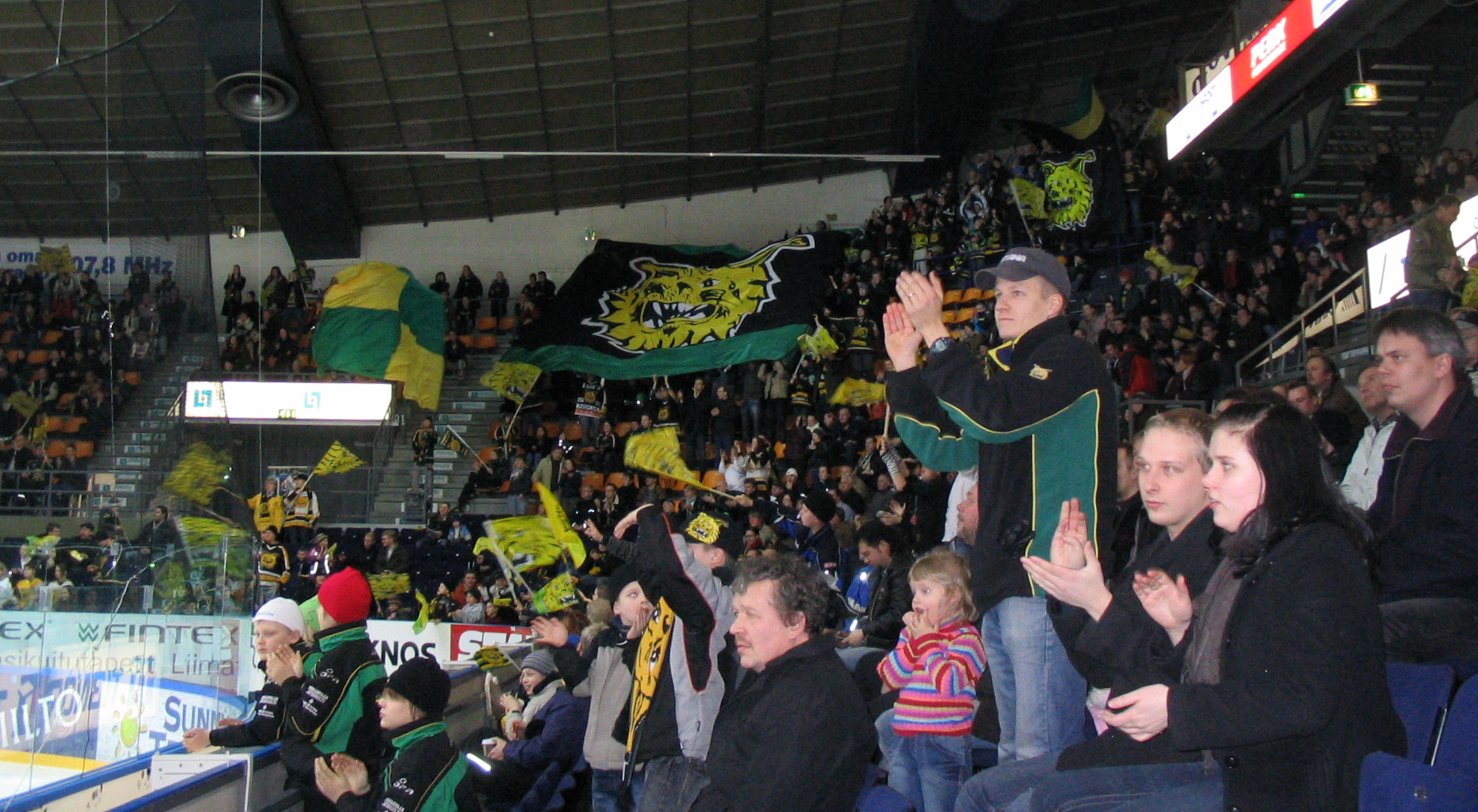
  Ilves fans celebrating a goal in February 2007.
- (bronze) SM-sarja Kanada-malja: 1963, 1964, 1967, 1974, 1975

=== SM-liiga ===
- (gold) SM-liiga Kanada-malja: 1985
- (silver) SM-liiga Kanada-malja: 1990, 1998
- (bronze) SM-liiga Kanada-malja: 1983, 1989, 2001, 2022, 2023

== Players ==
=== Current roster ===
Updated 19 June 2025.

No.	Nat	Player	Pos	S/G	Age	Acquired	Birthplace
20	(Finland)	Kasper Björkqvist	RW	L	29	2024	Espoo, Finland
11	(Sweden)	Erik Borg	C	L	29	2024	Gothenburg, Sweden
22	(Finland)	Teemu Engberg	LW	L	27	2025	Loviisa, Finland
25	(Finland)	Iivari Heikkinen	RW	L	22	2025	Oulu, Finland
9	(Czech Republic)	Lukáš Jašek	RW	R	29	2025	Třinec, Czech Republic
23	(Sweden)	Simon Johansson	D	R	27	2024	Stockholm, Sweden
48	(Sweden)	Carl Klingberg	RW	R	35	2024	Gothenburg, Sweden
19	(Czech Republic)	Ondřej Kos	LW	L	20	2024	Kuřim, Czech Republic
21	(Czech Republic)	Radek Kučeřík	D	L	24	2025	Kyjov, Czech Republic
35	(Finland)	Jimi Kuivila	G	L	21	2025	Tampere, Finland
43	(Finland)	Otto Latvala	D	R	27	2022	Alajärvi, Finland
27	(Finland)	Eemil Laurell	F	R	21	2024	Tampere, Finland
29	(Sweden)	Jens Lööke	RW	R	29	2024	Gävle, Sweden
12	(Finland)	Matias Mäntykivi	C	L	25	2021	Lappeenranta, Finland
28	(Sweden)	John Nyberg	D	L	30	2024	Gothenburg, Sweden
86	(Finland)	Joonas Nättinen (A)	C	R	35	2024	Jämsä, Finland
57	(Finland)	Jarkko Parikka	D	L	29	2015	Imatra, Finland
39	(Czech Republic)	Dominik Pavlát	G	L	26	2024	Tábor, Czech Republic
53	(Finland)	Arttu Pelli	D	R	30	2023	Kouvola, Finland
17	(Finland)	Samuli Ratinen	LW	L	28	2023	Saarijärvi, Finland
6	(Finland)	Sebastian Soini	D	R	20	2023	Tampere, Finland
72	(United States)	Lukáš Švejkovský	C	R	24	2024	Tampa, Florida, United States
60	(Finland)	Roope Taponen	G	L	25	2025	Espoo, Finland
46	(Slovenia)	Matic Török	F	L	23	2025	Kranj, Slovenia
37	(Finland)	Toni Utunen	D	L	26	2024	Kokkola, Finland

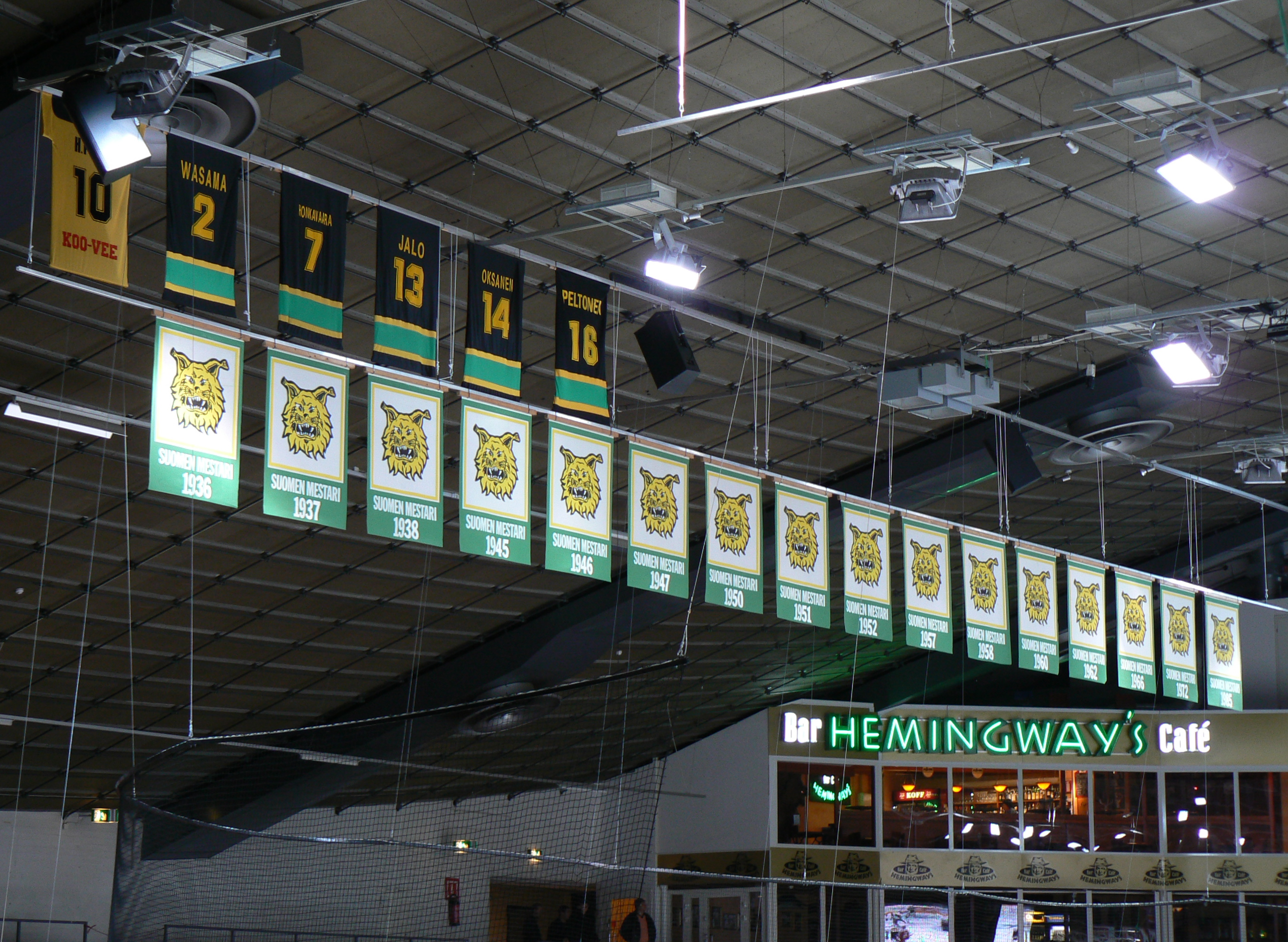
Banners commemorating championships and retired player numbers of Ilves in Tampereen jäähalli.

=== Honored members ===
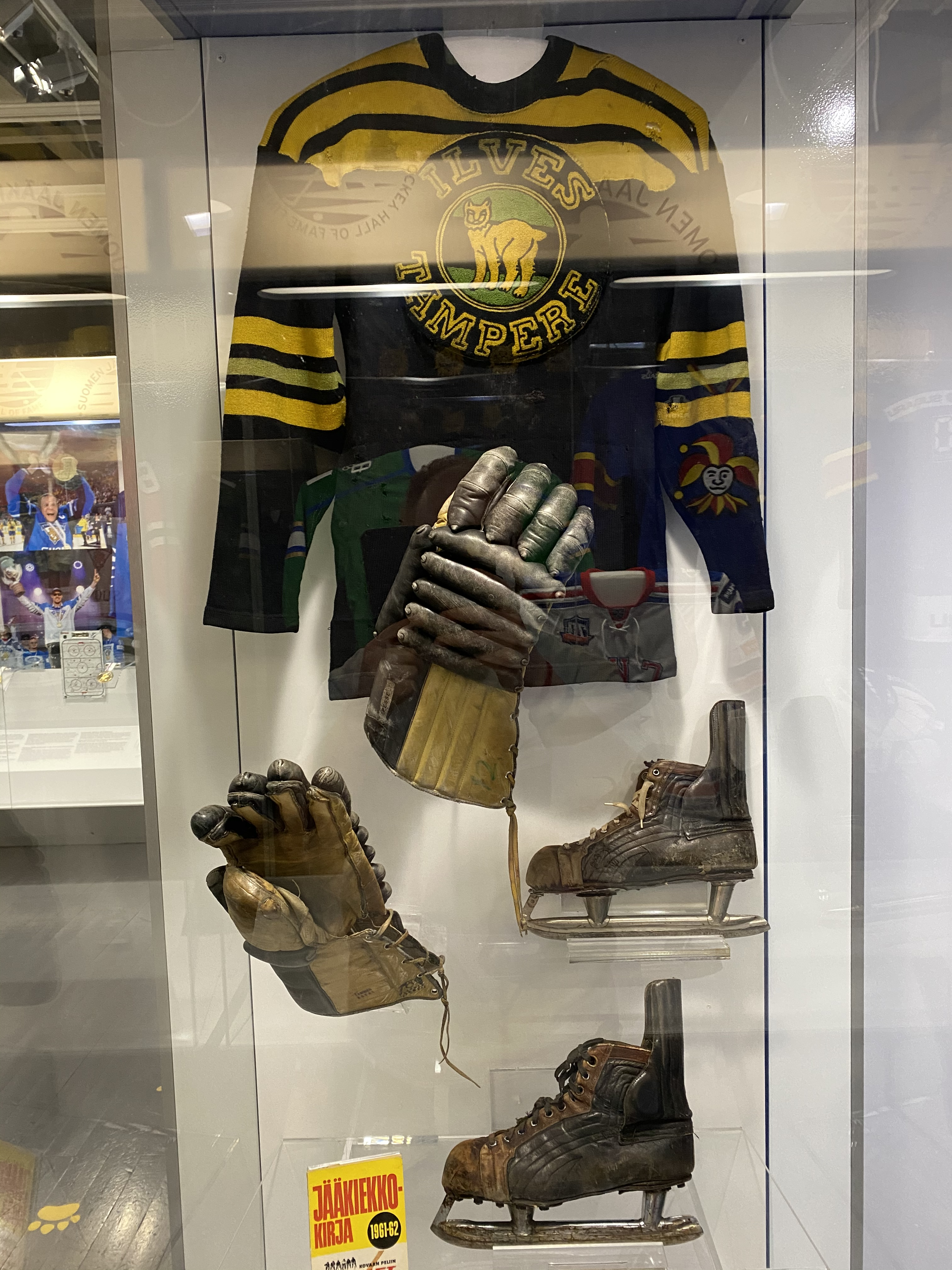
Ilves 1960s jerseys

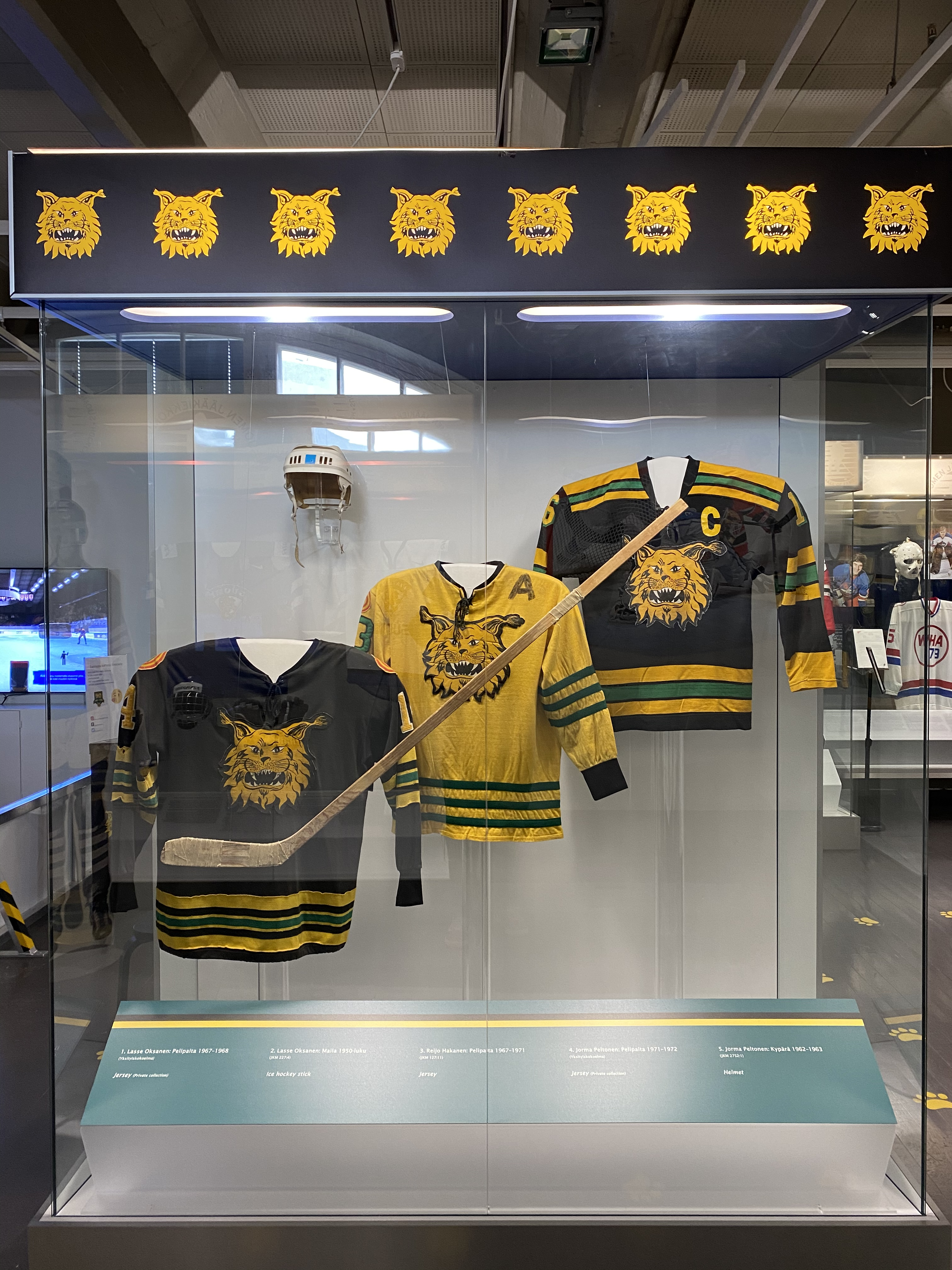
Ilves jerseys at the club's 90th anniversary exhibition

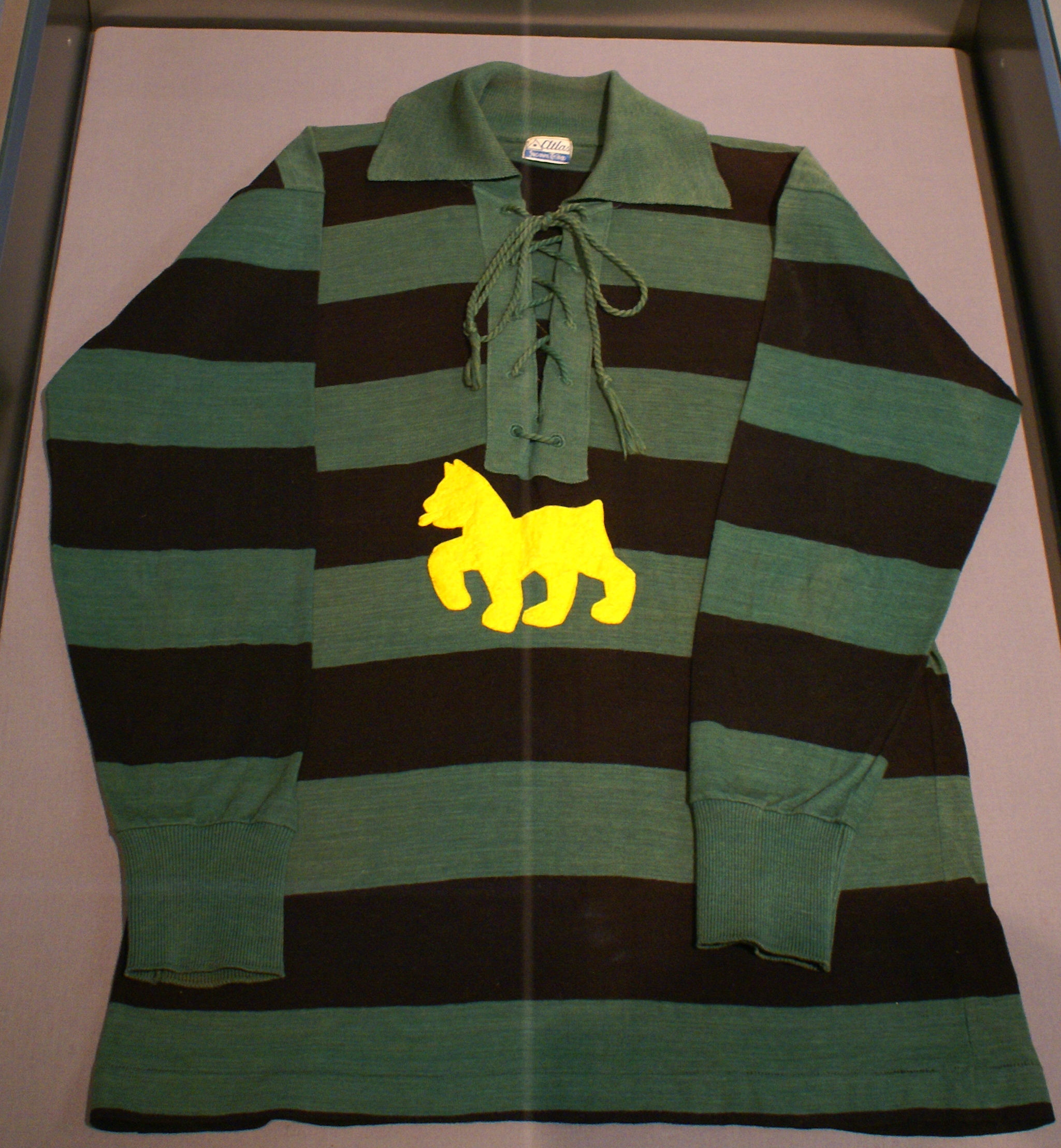
The first Ilves jersey from 1932

- 2 Jarmo Wasama
- 7 Aarne Honkavaara
- 13 Risto Jalo
- 14 Lasse Oksanen
- 16 Jorma Peltonen, Marianne Ihalainen
- 30 Jukka Tammi
- 41 Raimo Helminen

Source: Ilves-Historia

Number 24 has not been officially retired, but is not in use. It was last worn by Veikko Suominen, who died during the 1978–79 season.

== Coaches ==
=== Current staff ===
- Head Coach: (Finland) Tommi Niemelä
- Assistant Coach: (Finland) Joonas Tanska
- Assistant Coach: (Finland) Pasi Saarinen
- Assistant Coach: (Finland) Jarkko Näppilä
- Goaltending Coach: (Finland) Markus Korhonen
- Team Manager: (Finland) Timo Peltomaa

=== All-time head coaches ===
- Niilo Tammisalo 1931–37
- Risto Lindroos 1937–46, 1949–53
- Aarne Honkavaara 1952–61, 1967–68
- Henry Kvist 1946–49
- Seppo Helle 1961–64
- Rauli Virtanen 1964–65
- Erkki Koiso 1965–66
- Raimo Vasama 1968–71, 1972–75
- Juhani Ruusunen 1971–72, 1976–80
- Len Lunde 1972–73
- Matti Reunamäki 1974–75
- Esko Mäkinen 1974–76
- Raimo Määttänen 1980–82
- Seppo Hiitelä 1982–87, 1990–91
- Matti Kaario 1986–87, 1990–91, 1999*
- Sakari Pietilä 1987–90, 2006–2009
- Anatoli Bogdanov 1991–93
- Jukka Jalonen 1992–95
- Heikki Vesala 1994–95
- Vladimir Jursinov Jr. 1995–99
- Heikki Mälkiä 1999–2001, 2009–10*
- Ari-Pekka Selin 2001–03
- Teijo Räsänen 2002–03
- Vaclav Sykora 2003–05
- Curt Lindström 2004–05
- Kari Eloranta 2005–06
- Petteri Hirvonen 2006*
- Sakari Pietilä 2006–09
- Juha Pajuoja 2010–12*
- Seppo Hiitelä 2011–12
- Raimo Helminen 2012–2013
- Tuomas Tuokkola 2013–2016 January
- Kari Heikkilä 2016 January–March
- Kari Kivi 2017–2020 September
- Jouko Myrrä 2020 October–2022 October
- Antti Pennanen 2022 October–2024 March
- Tommi Niemelä 2024 May-present
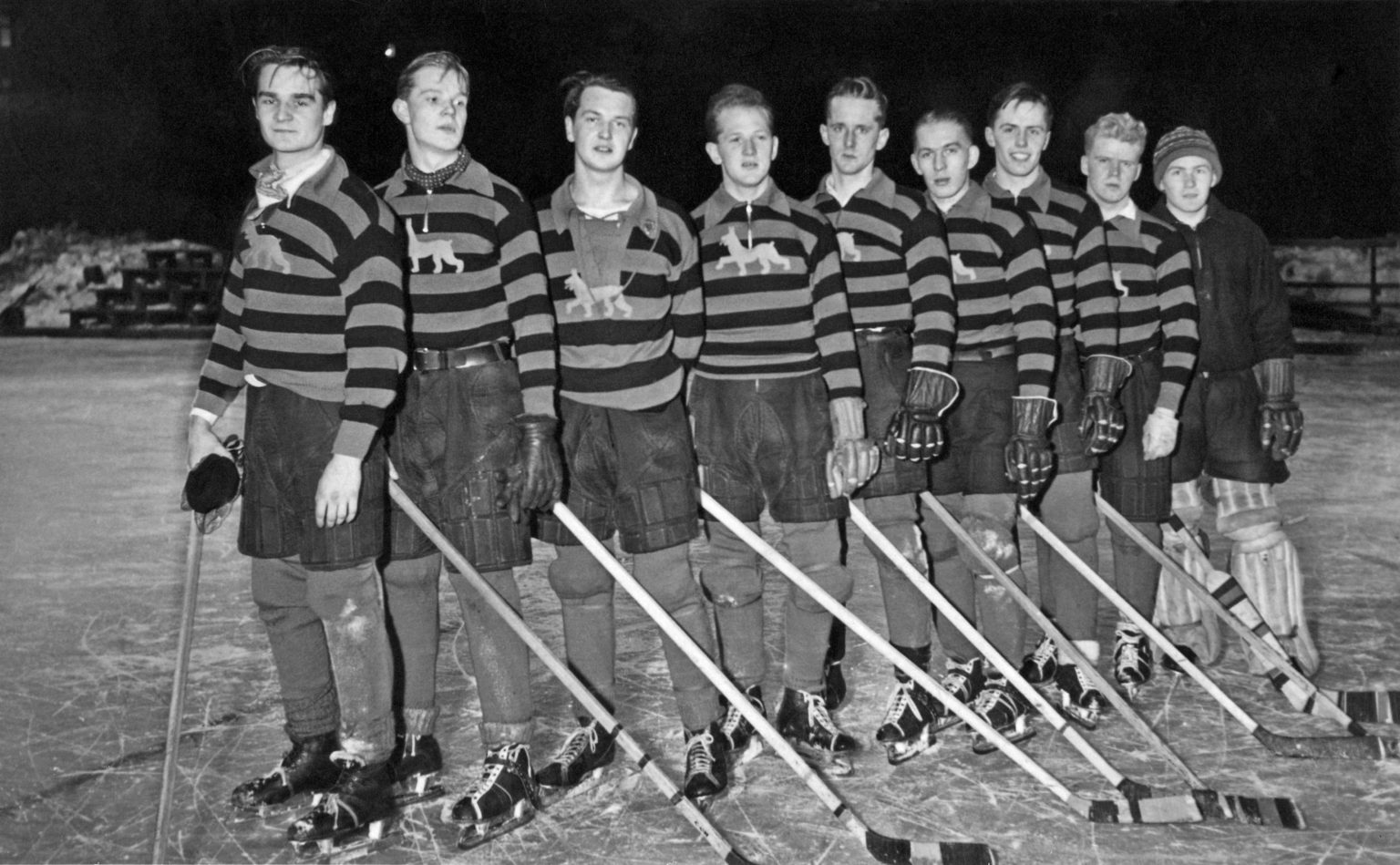
(1938)

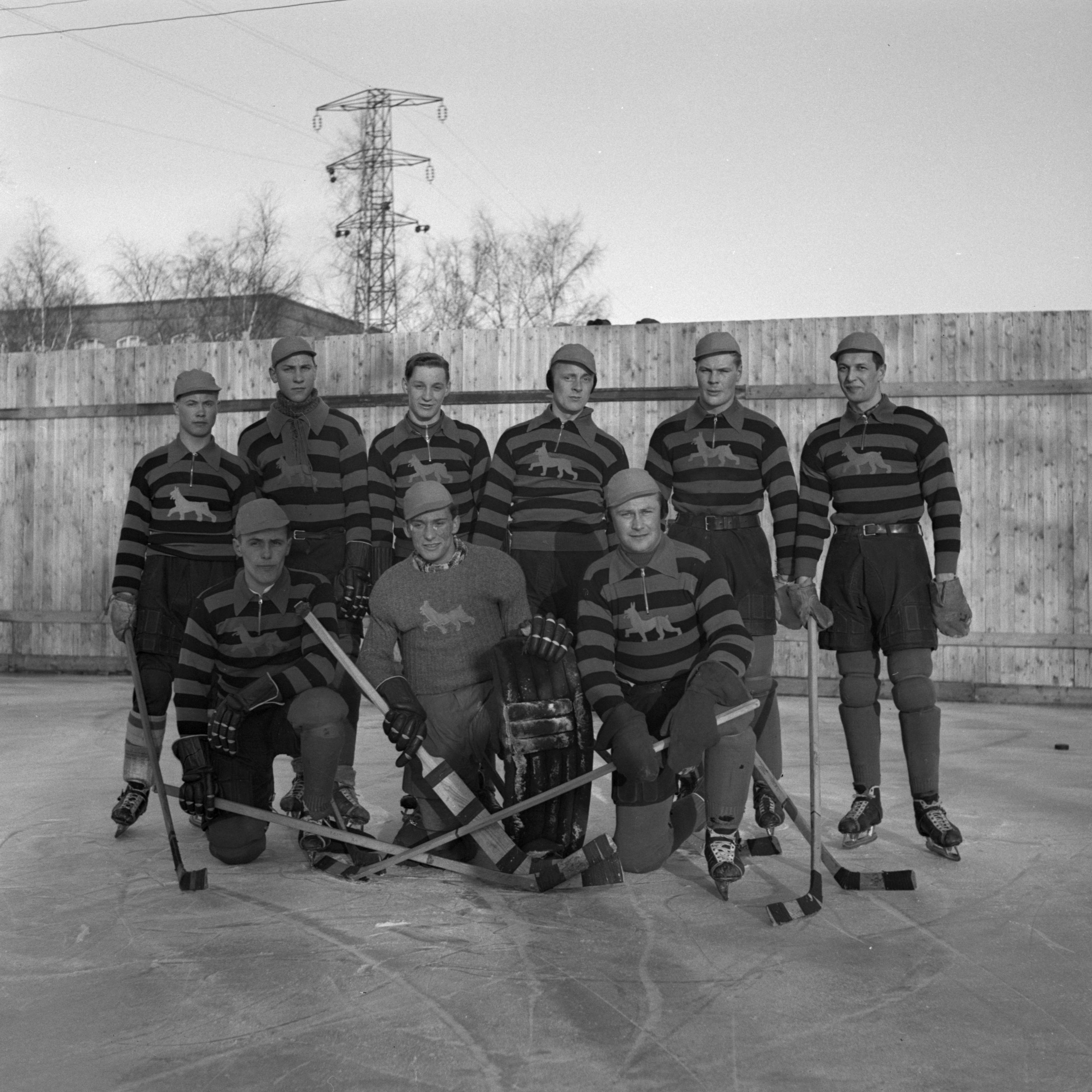
(1945)

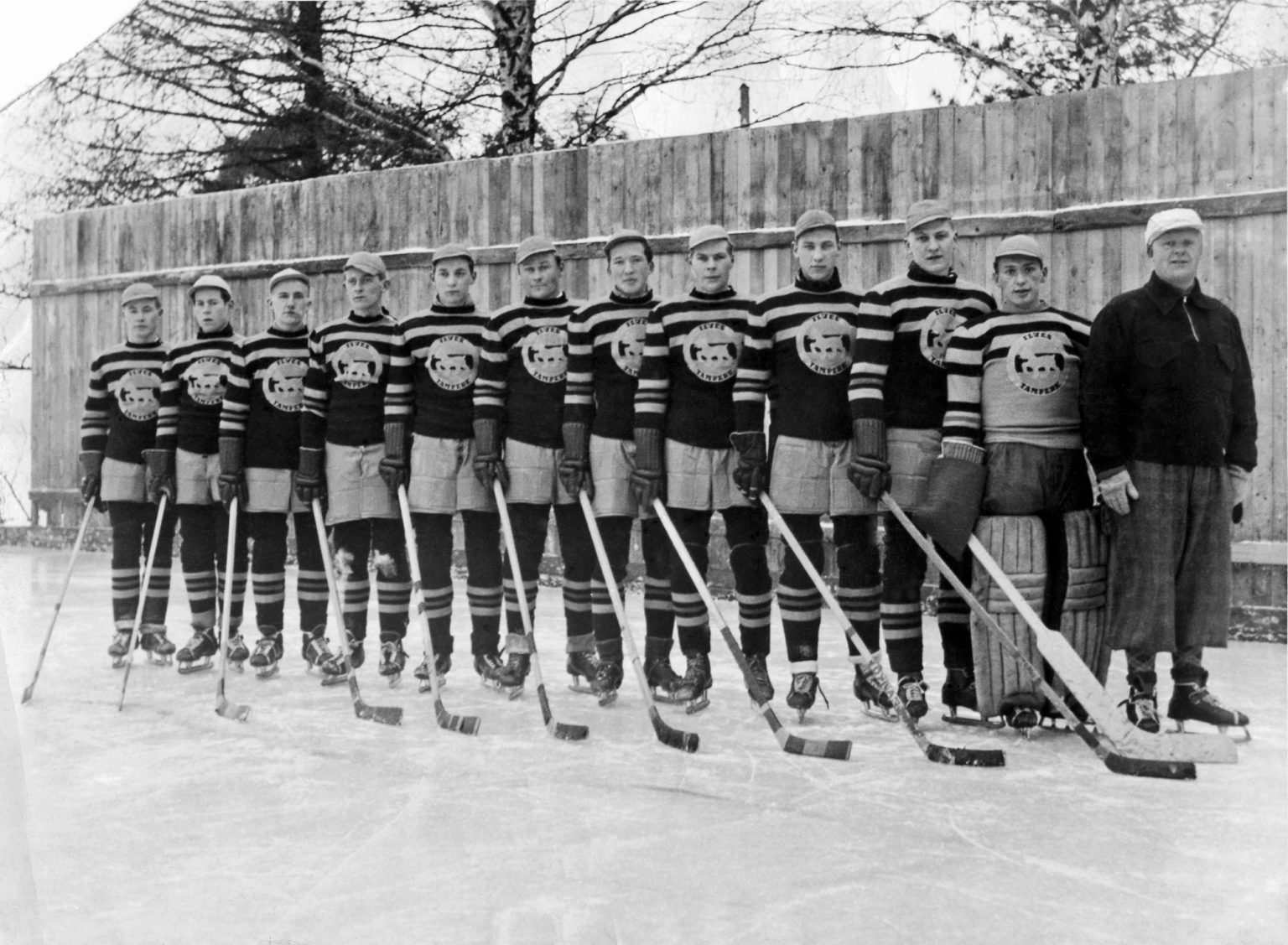
(1946)

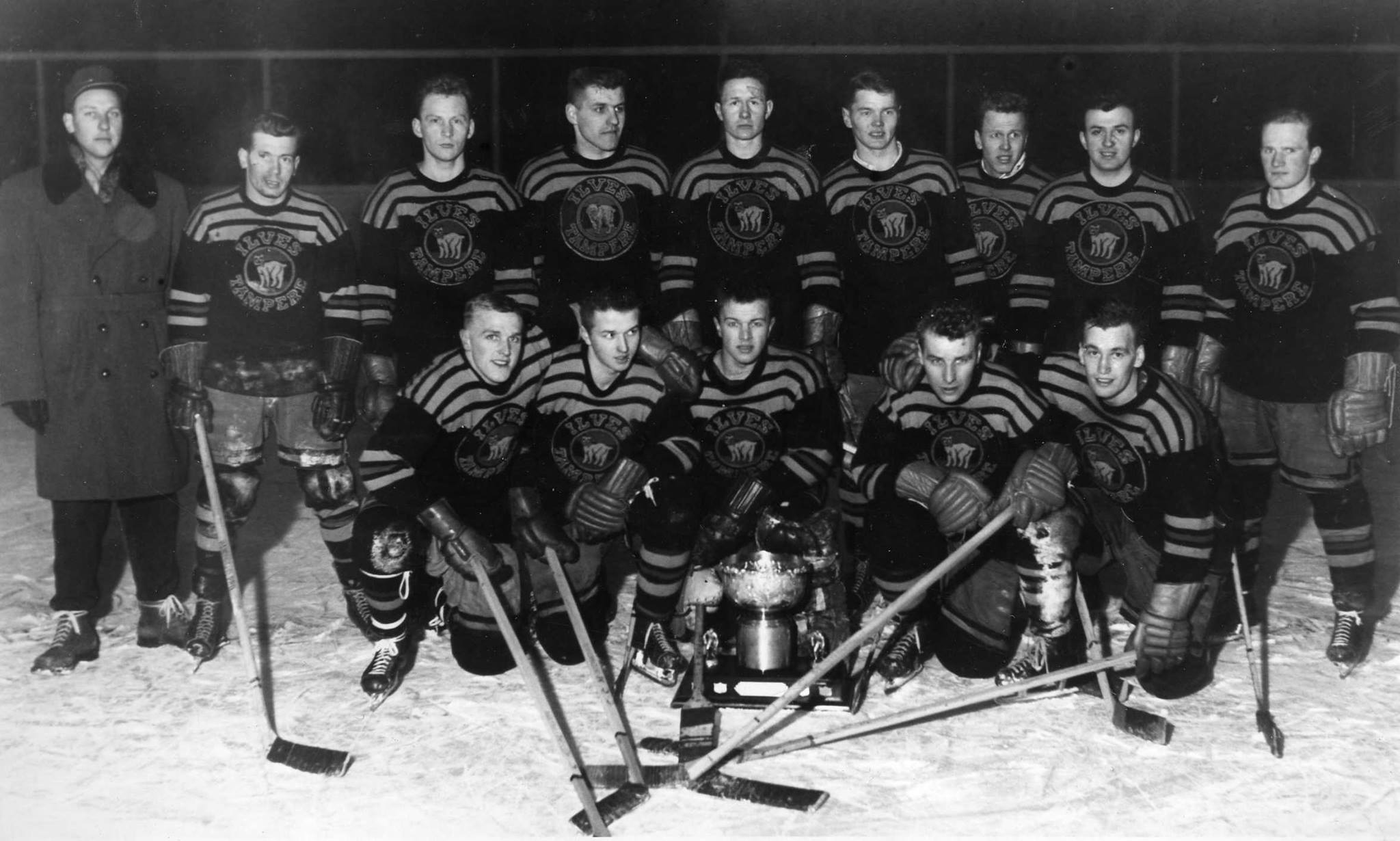
(1958)

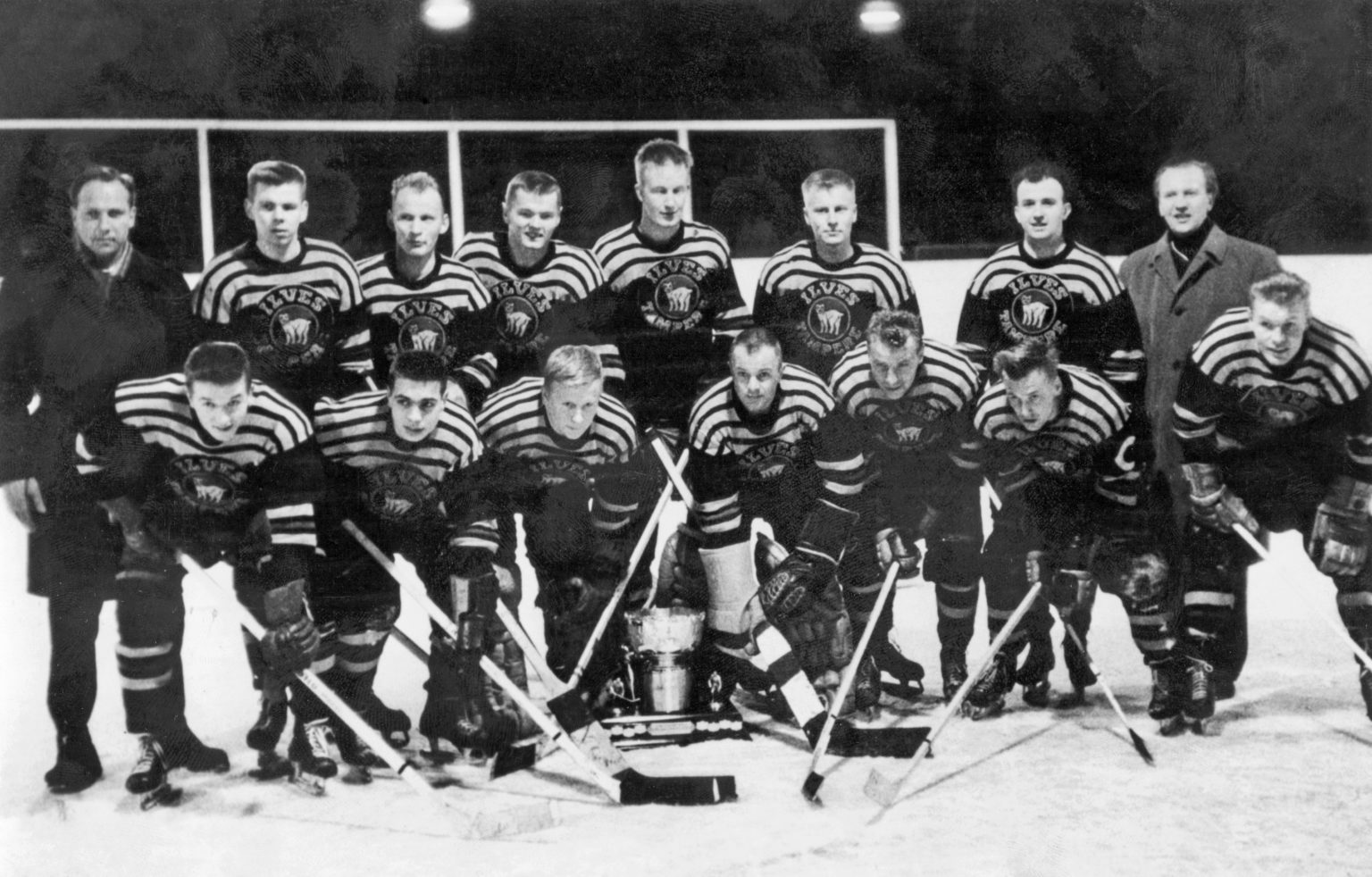
(1960)

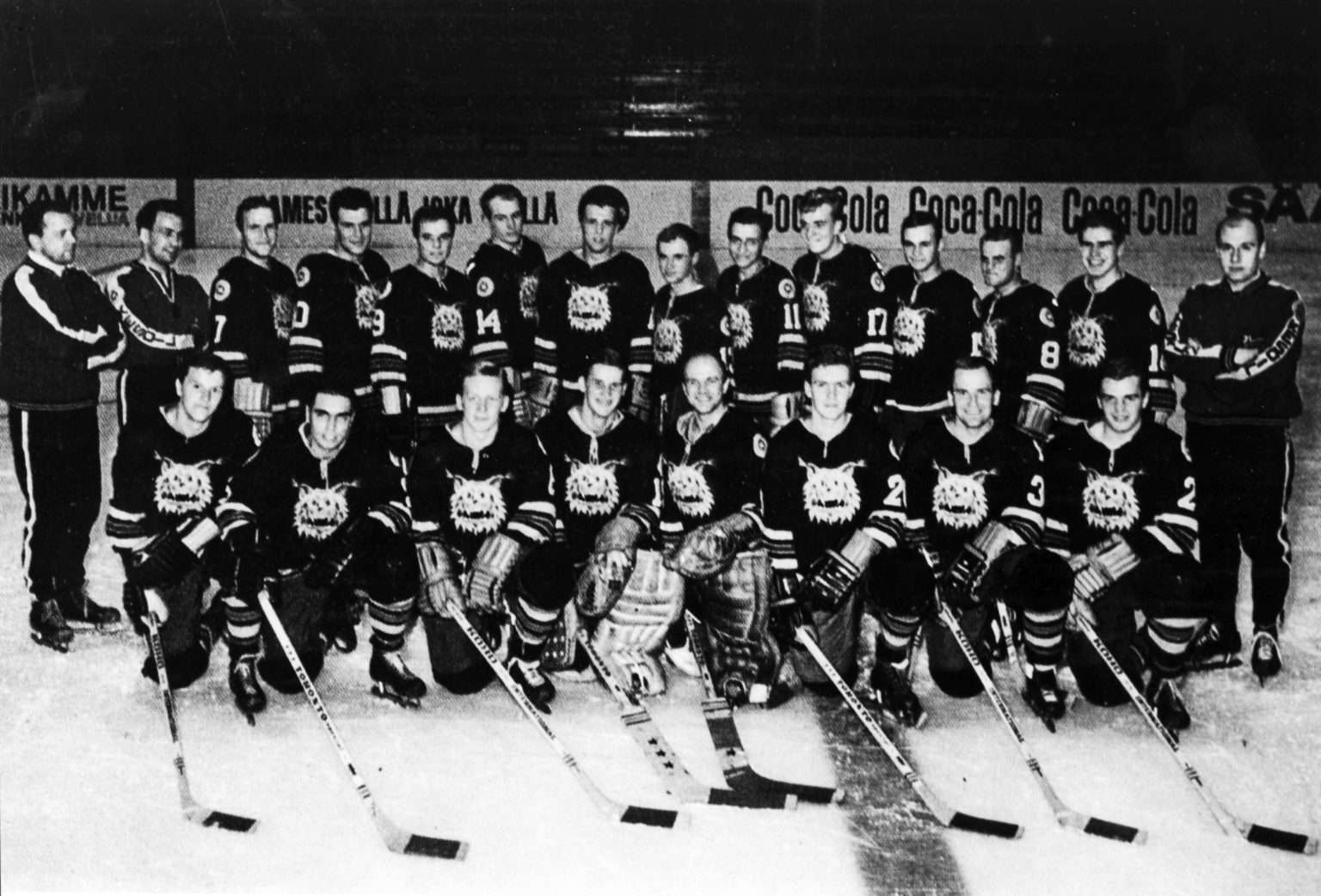
(1966)

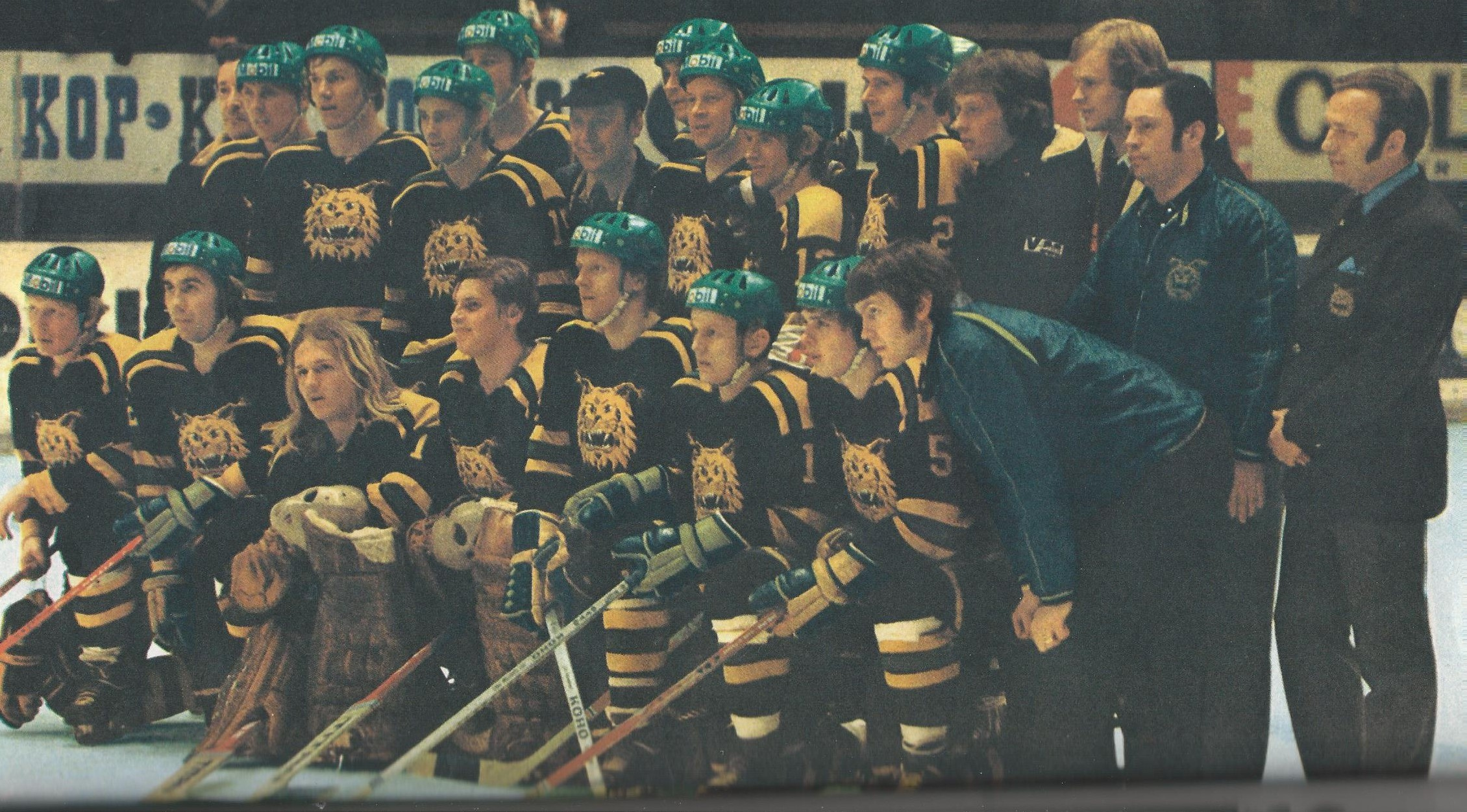
(1972)

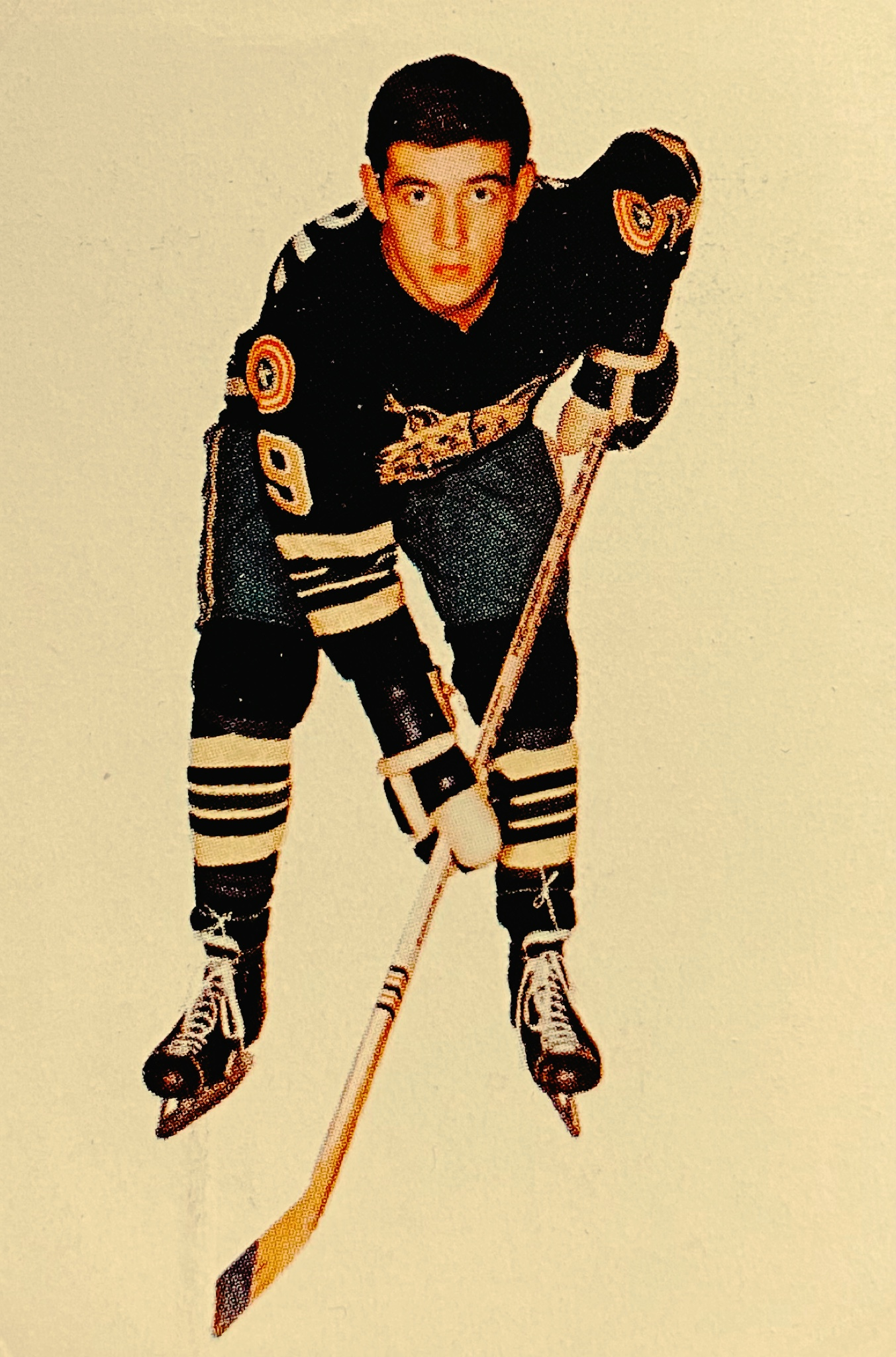
Ali Saadetdin, Finnish Tatar

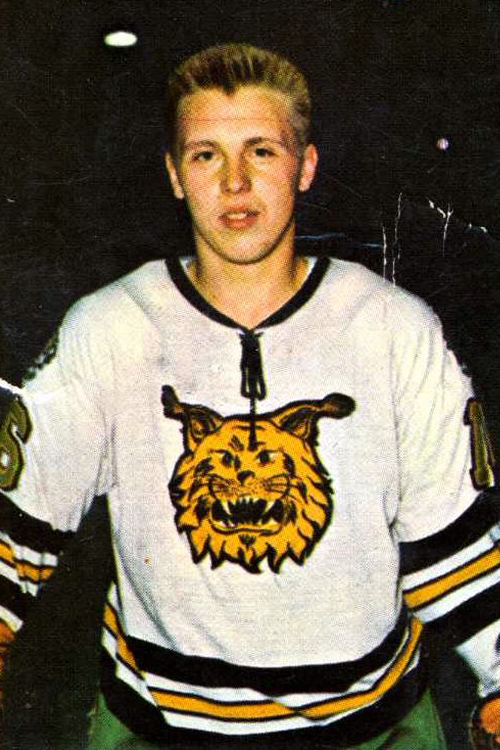
Jorma Peltonen

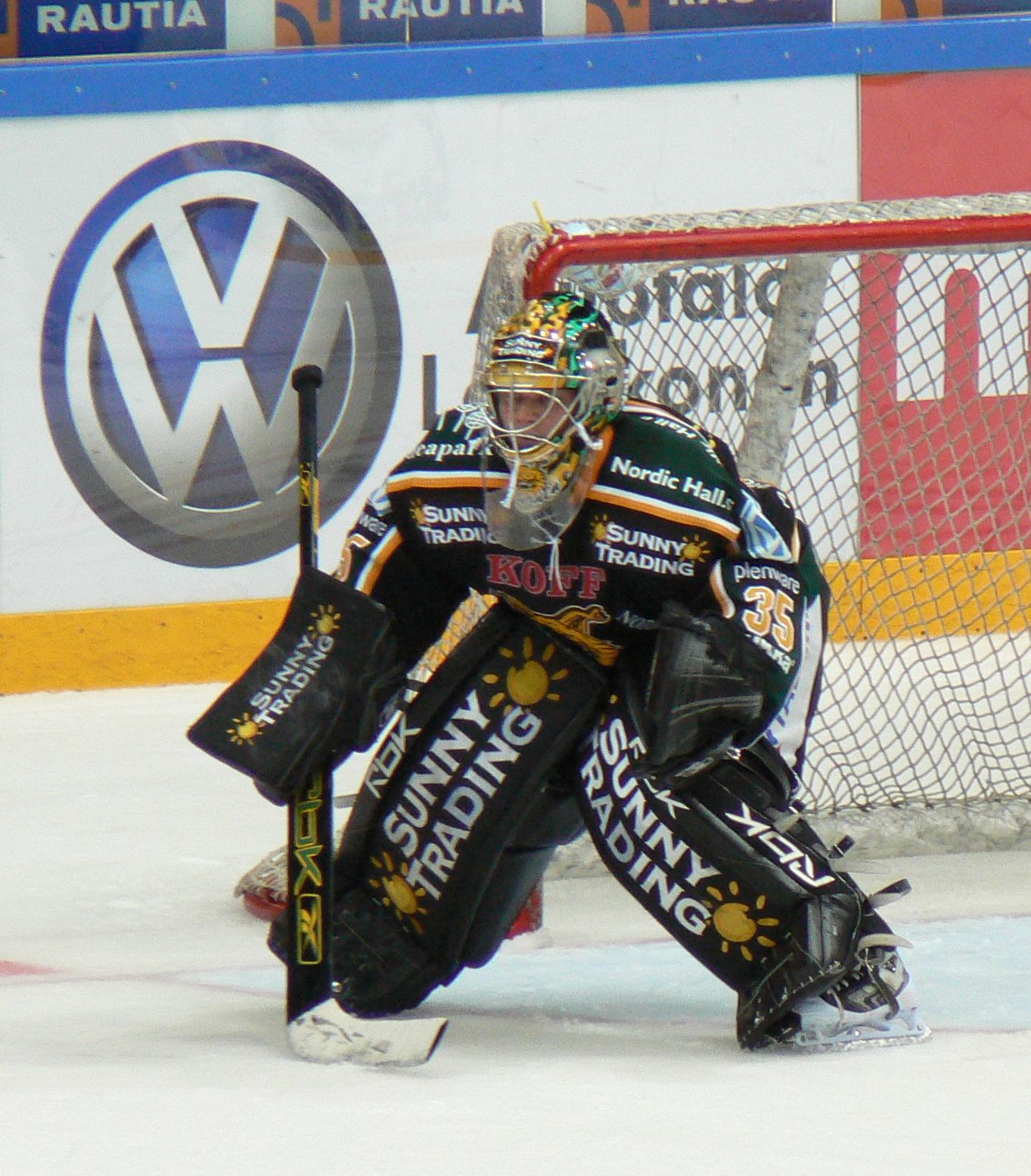
Tero Leinonen

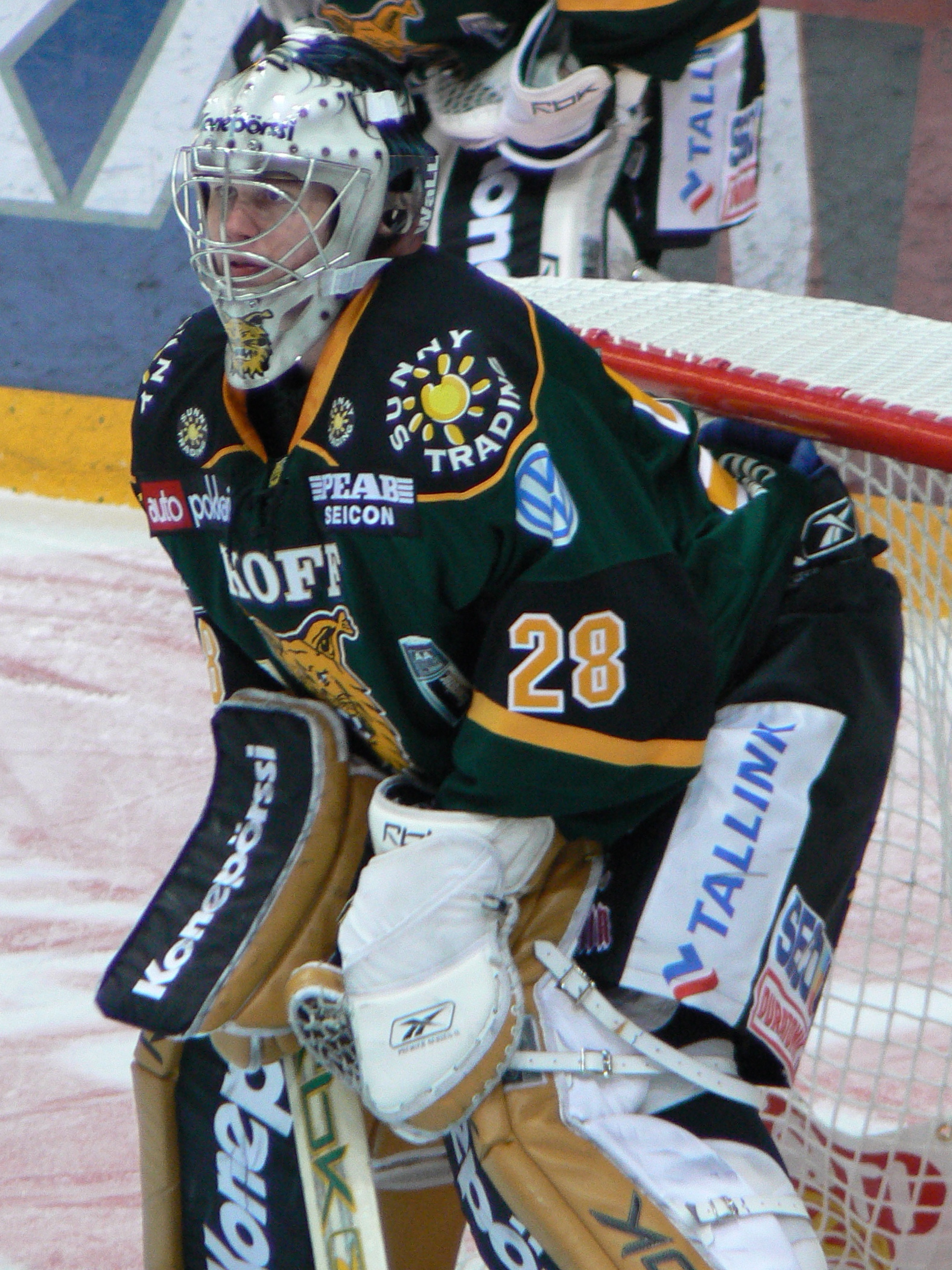
Hannu Toivonen

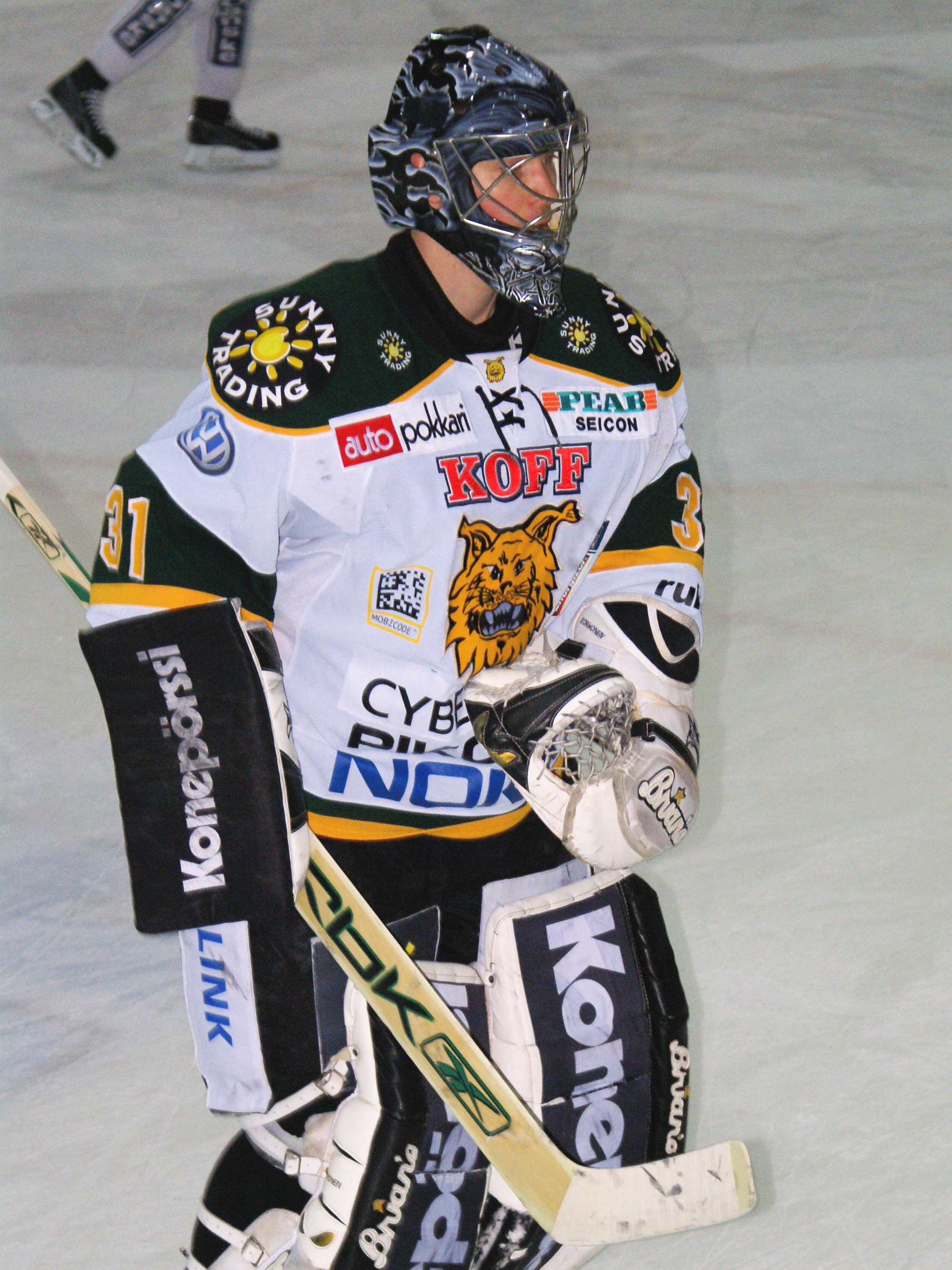
Markus Korhonen

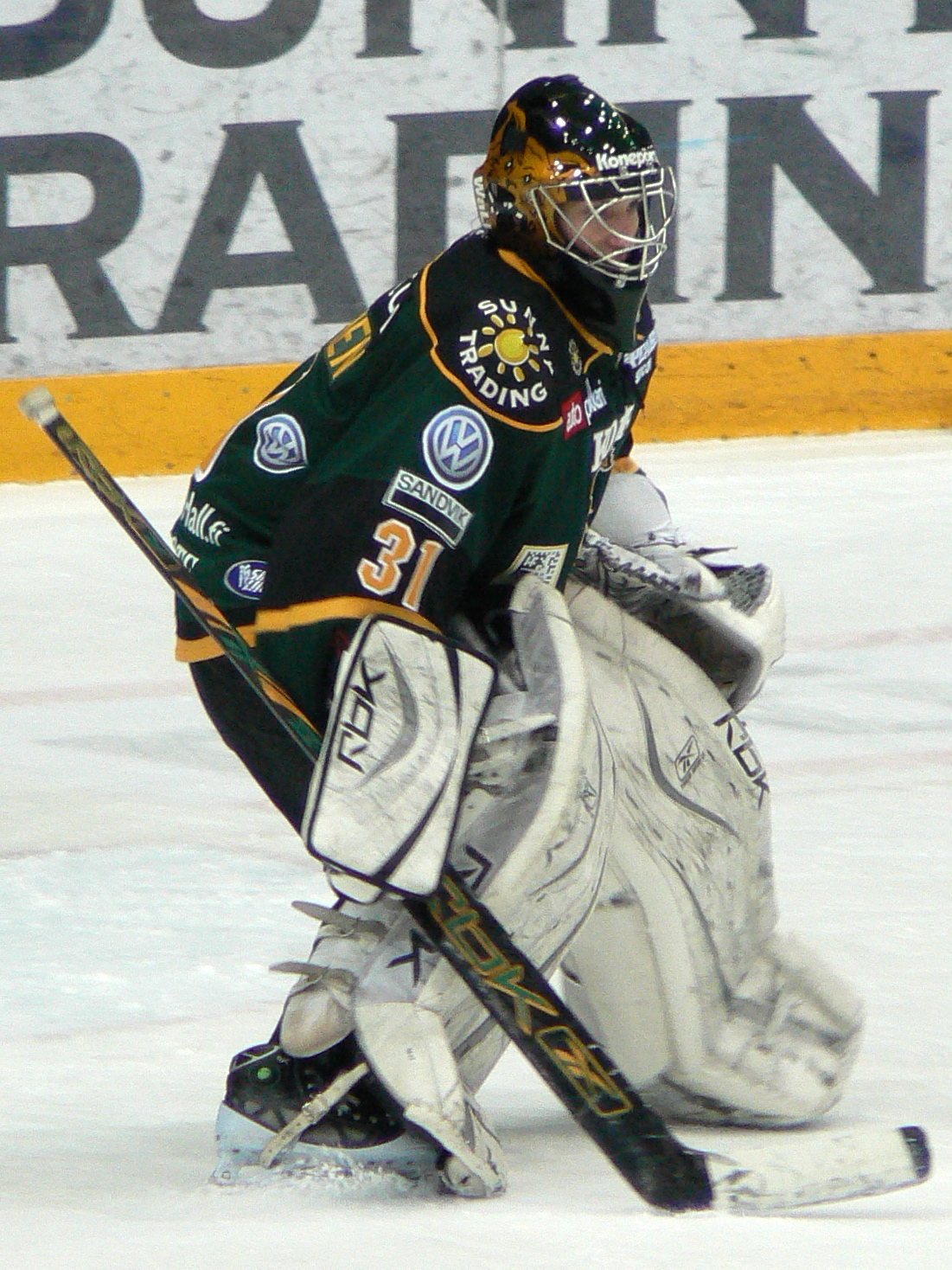
Niko Sulkanen

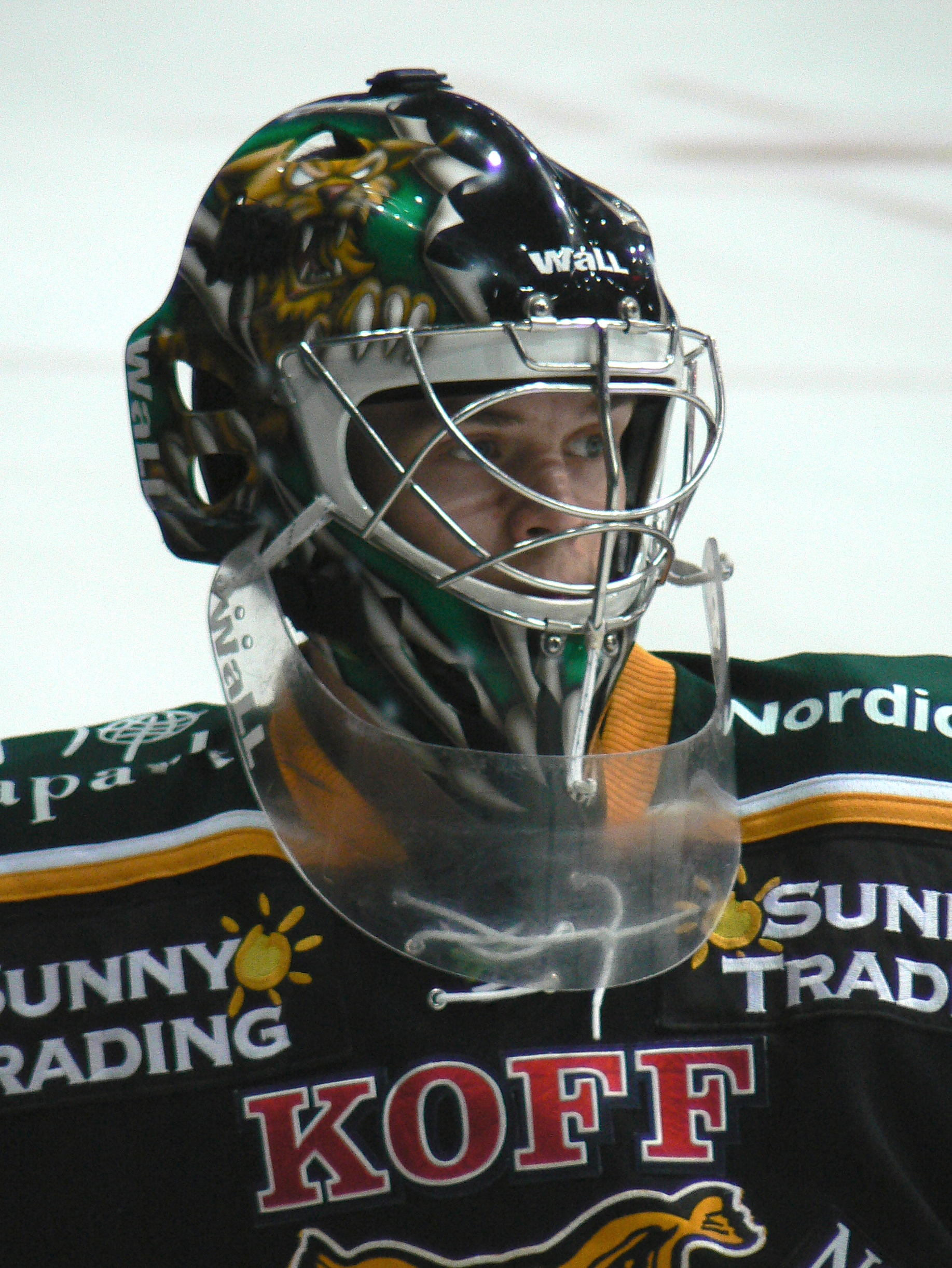
Mikko Pätsi

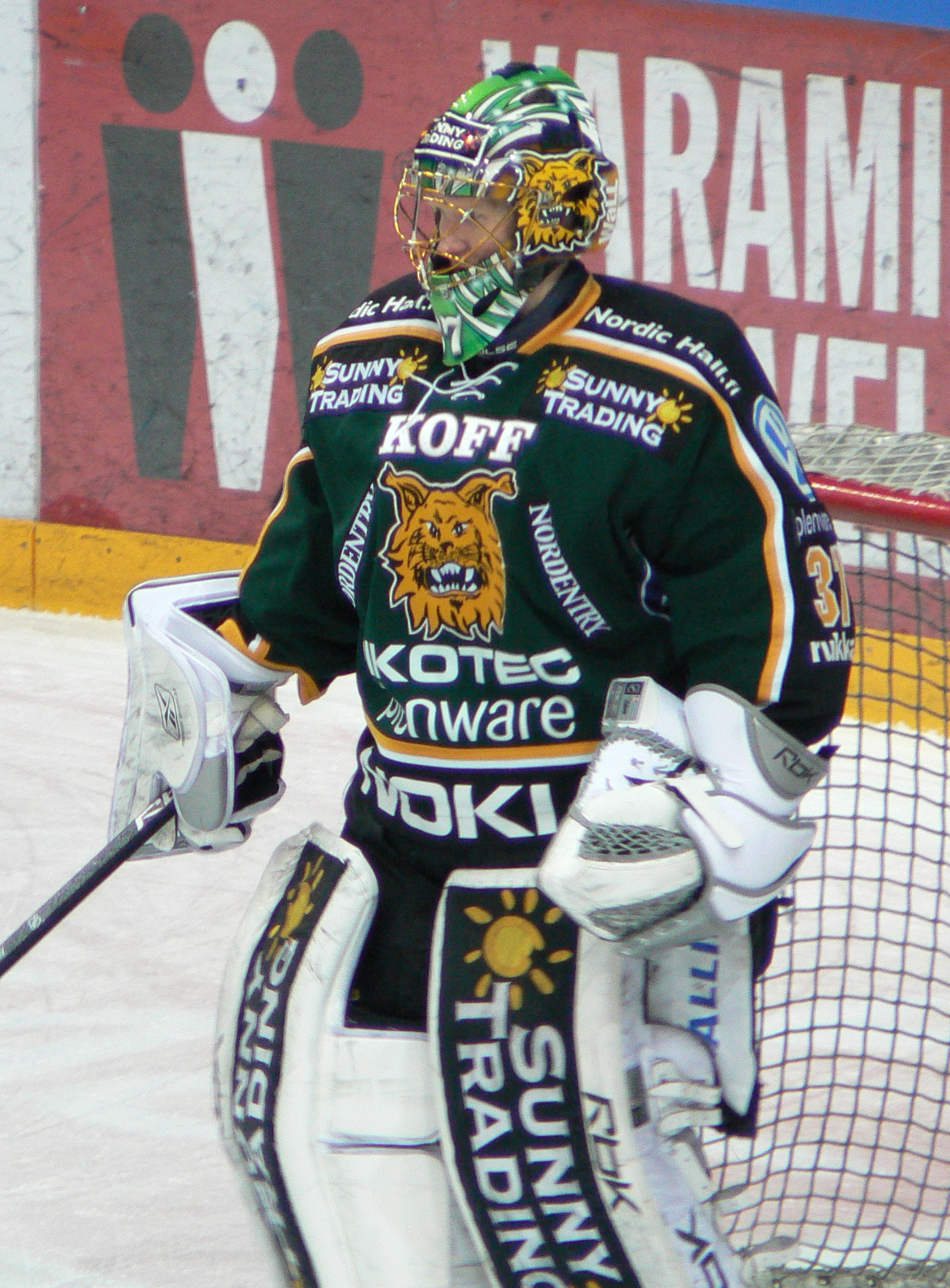
Pasi Häkkinen

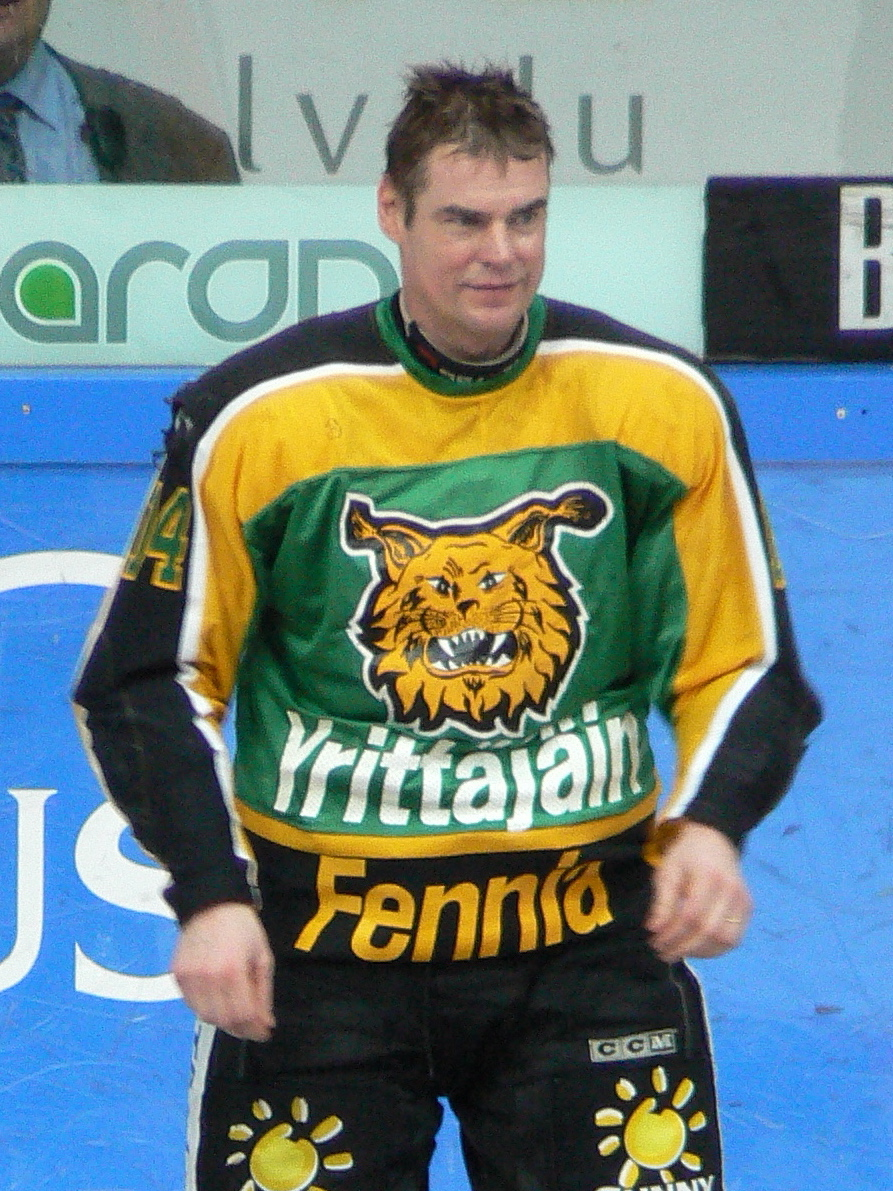
Raimo Helminen

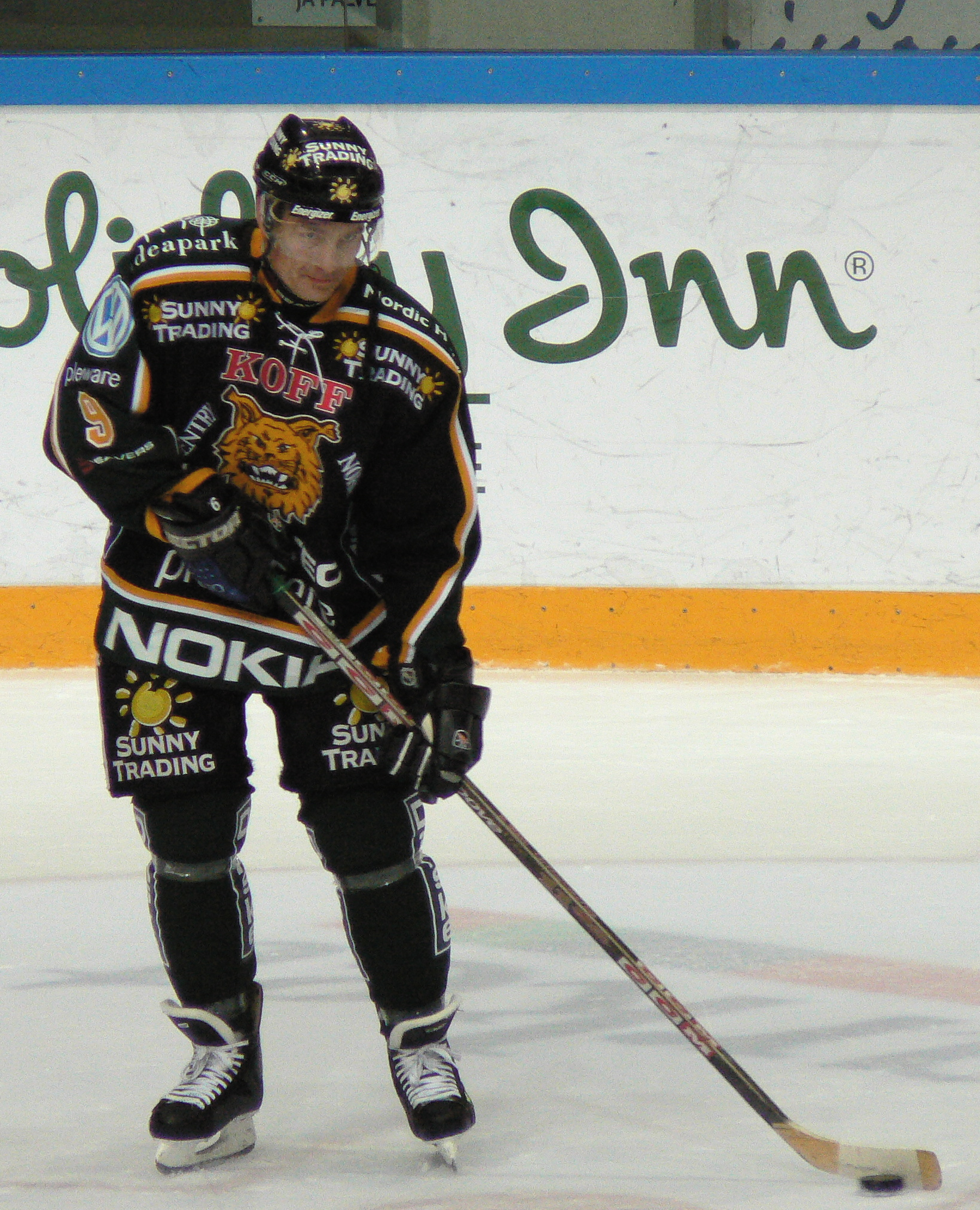
Mikko Peltola

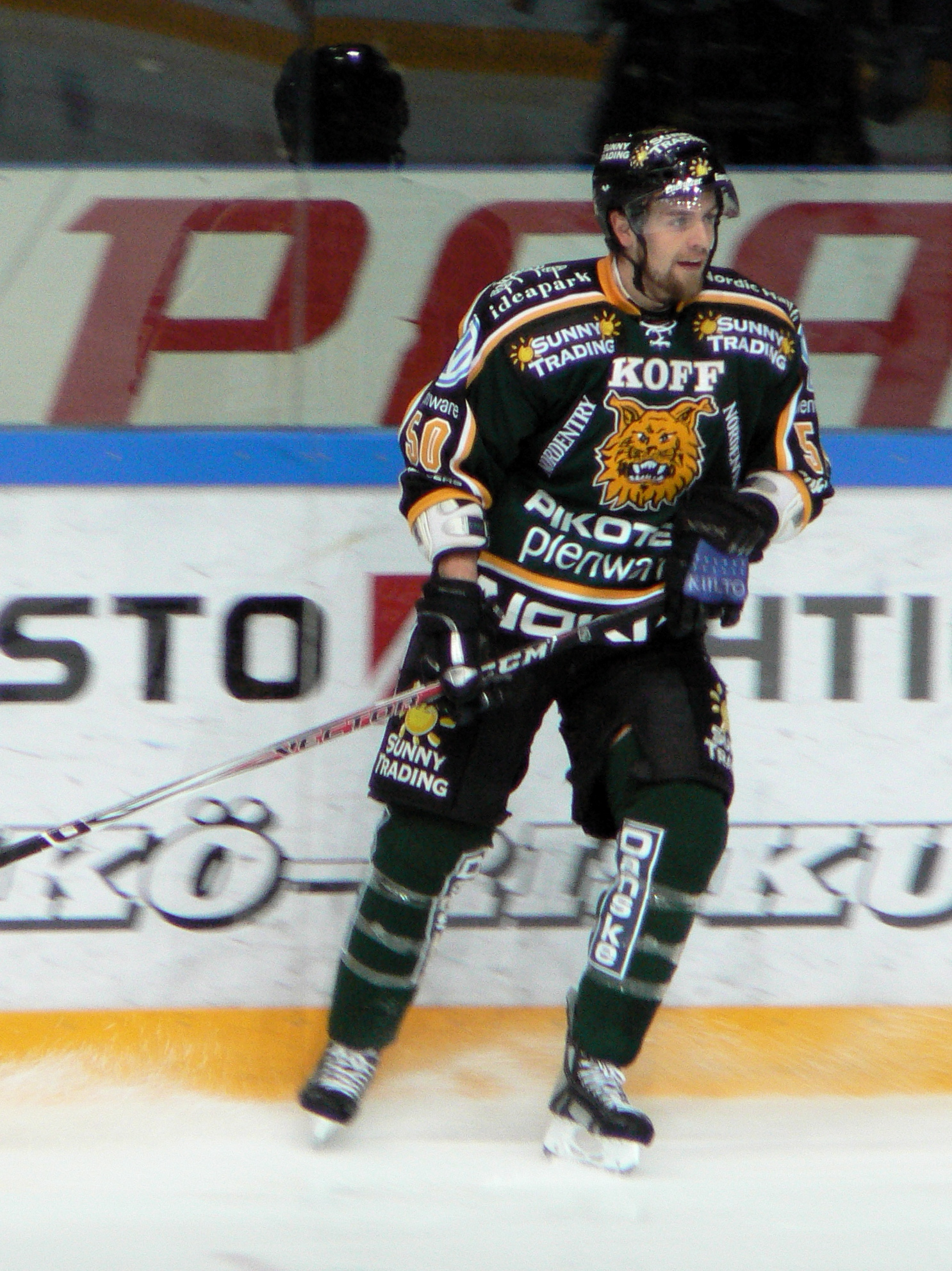
Matt Nickerson

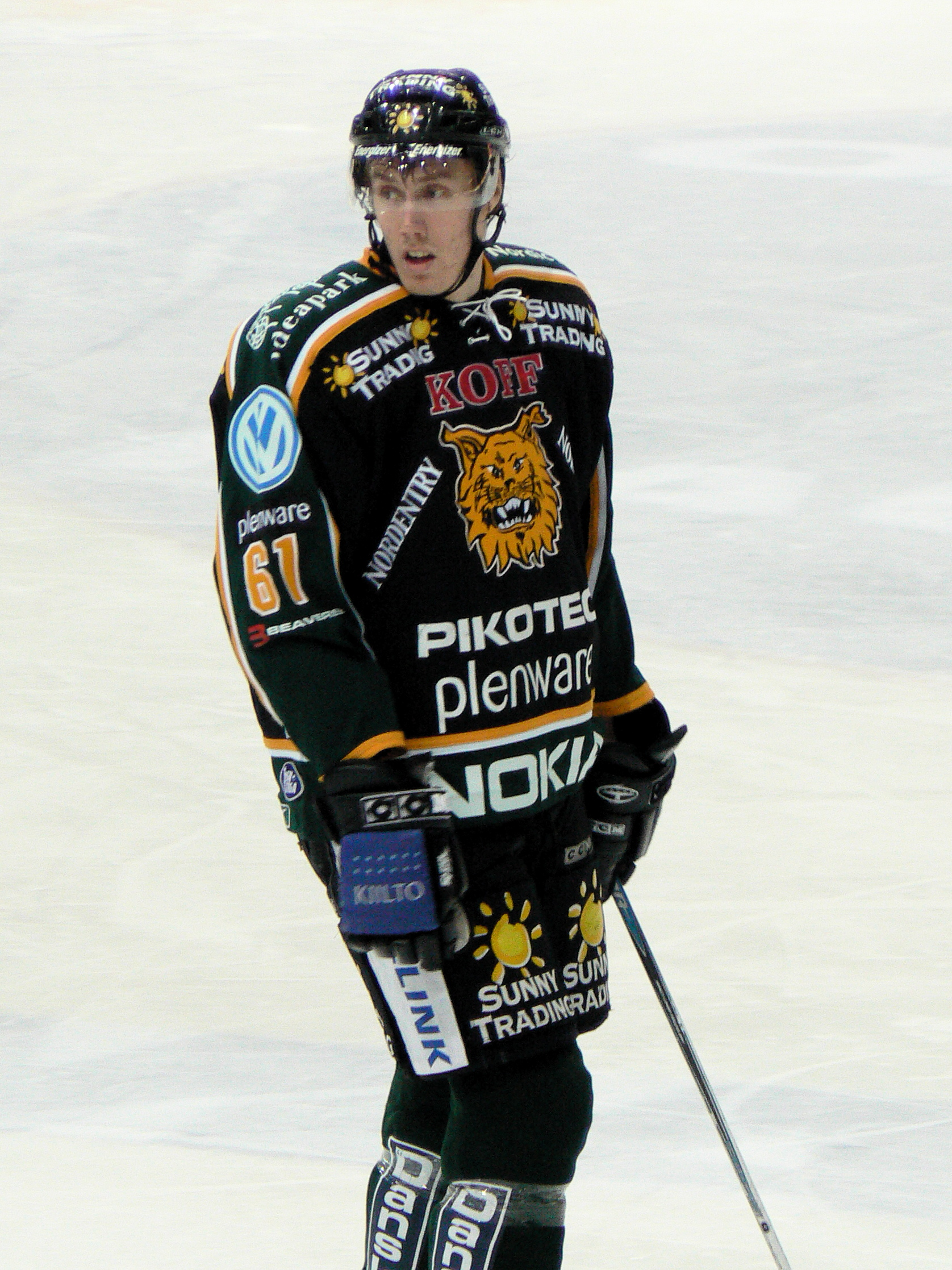
Marko Anttila

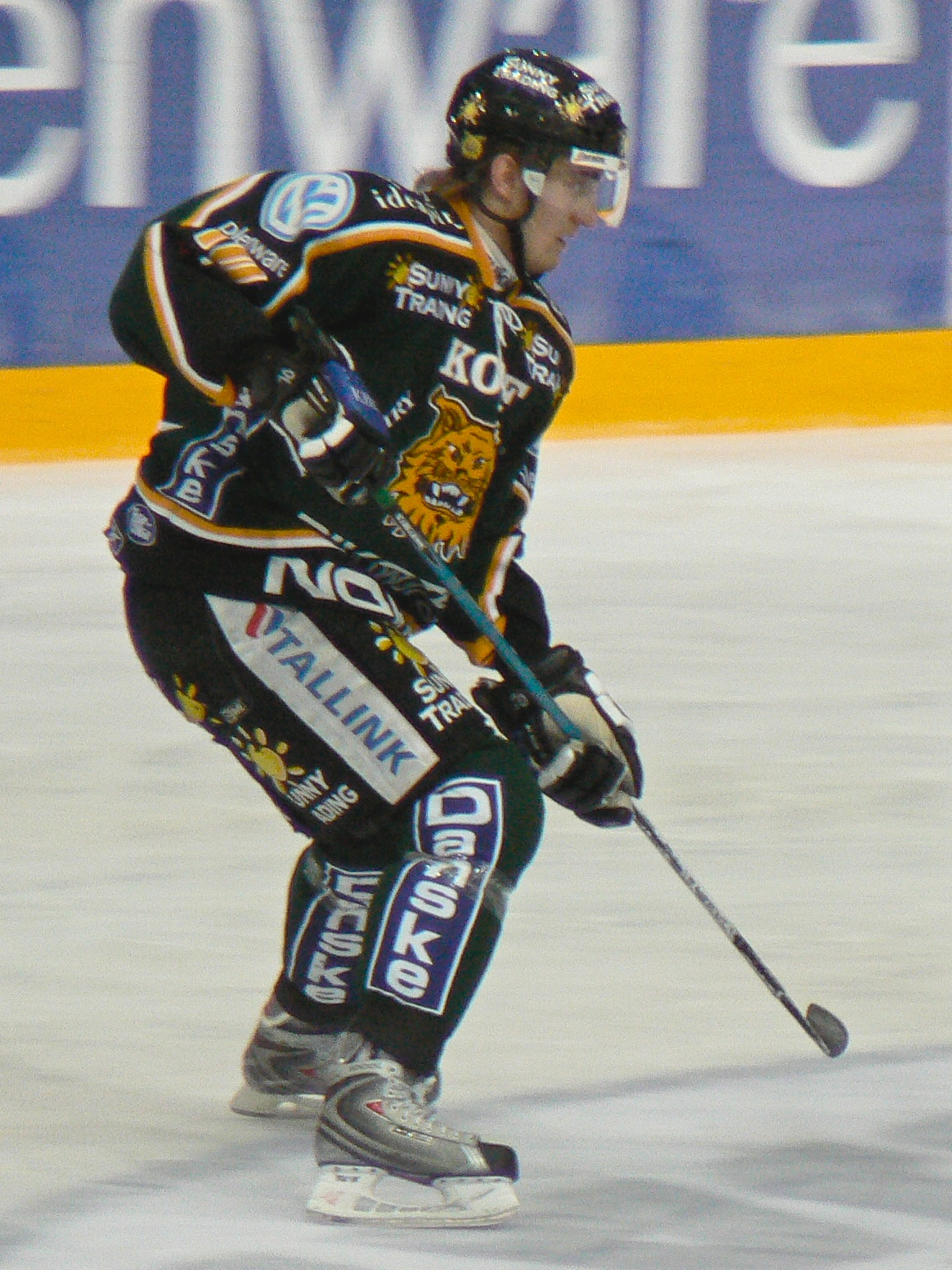
Sami Sandell

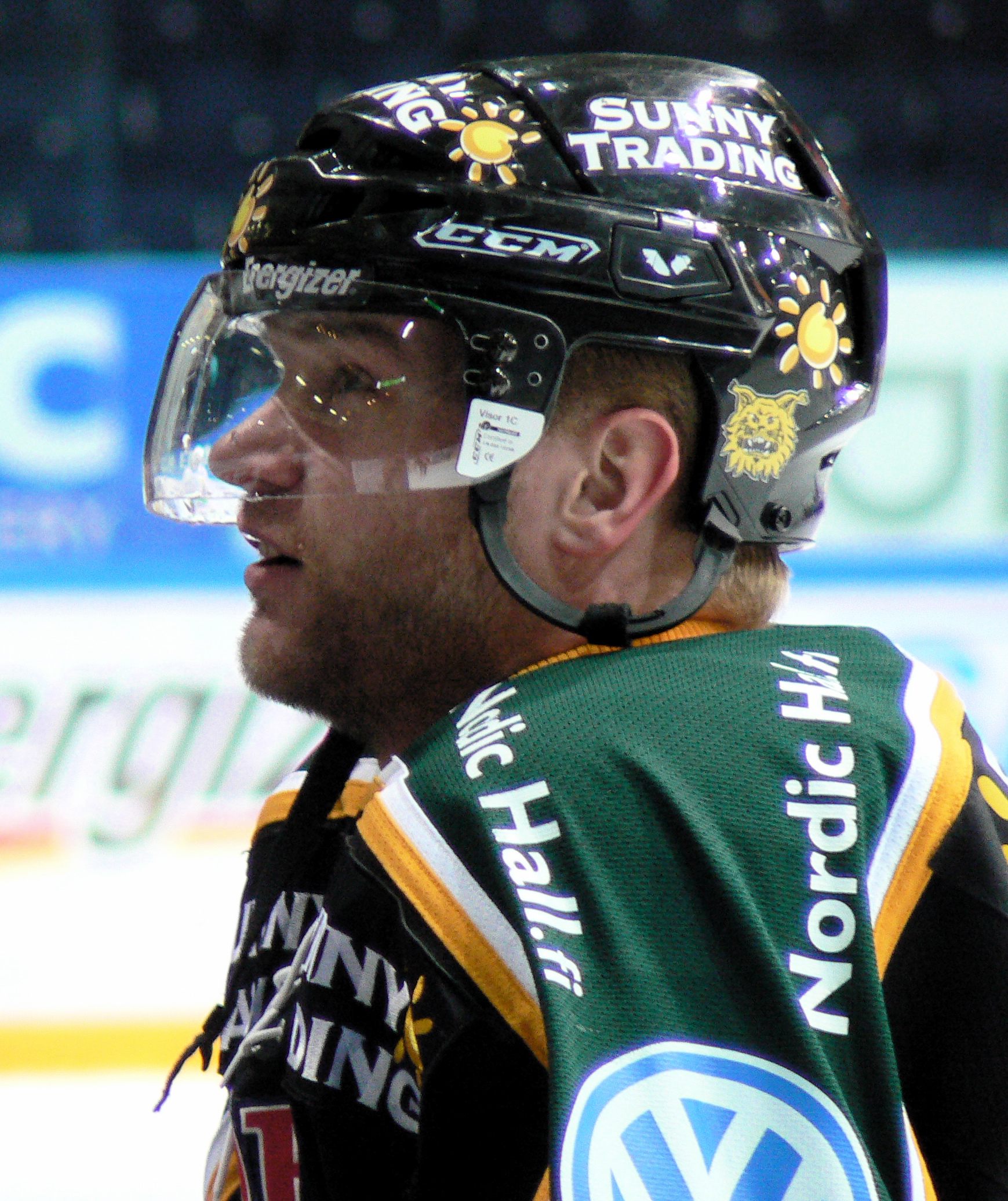
Sami Torkki

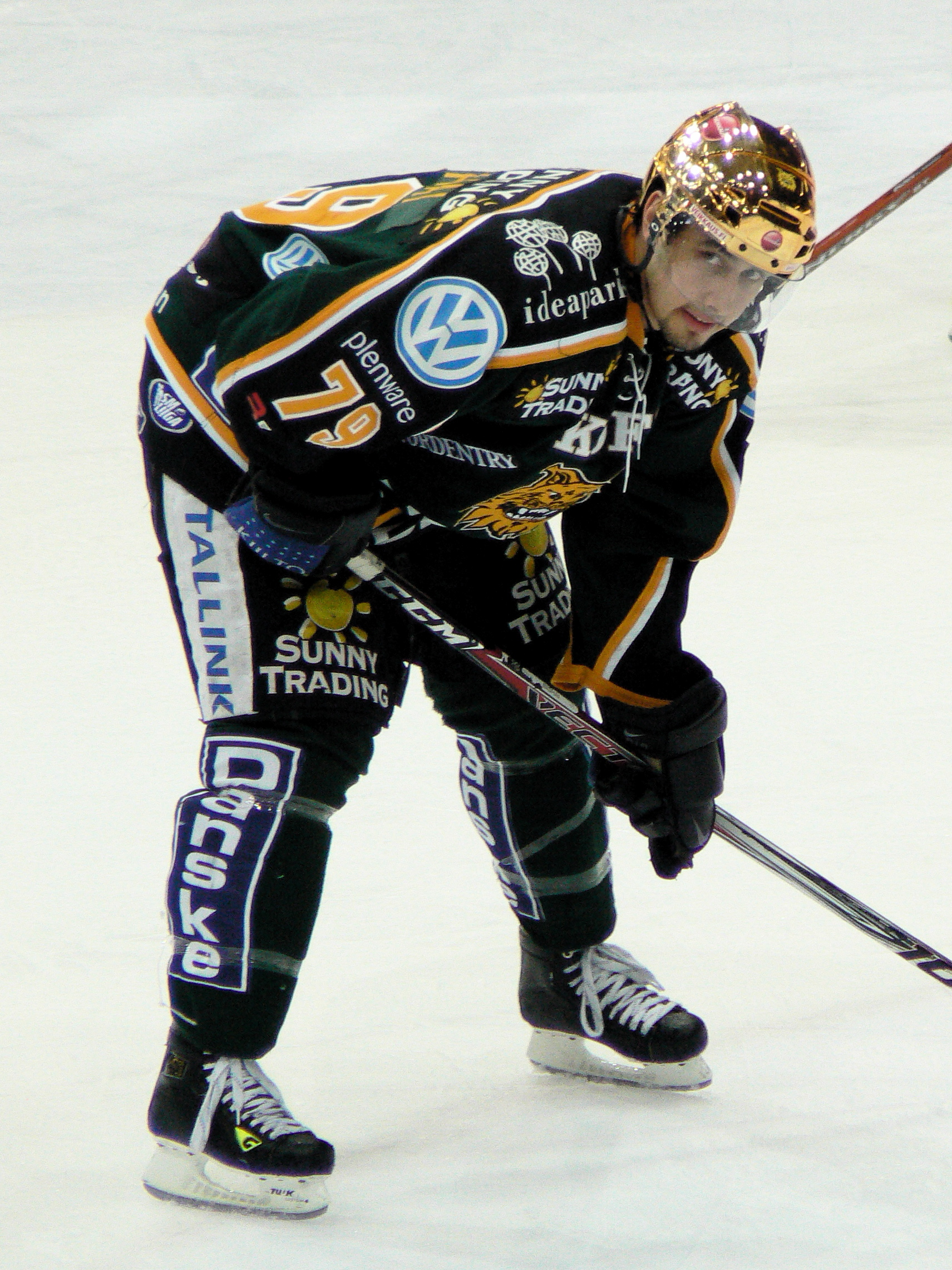
Mike Bishai

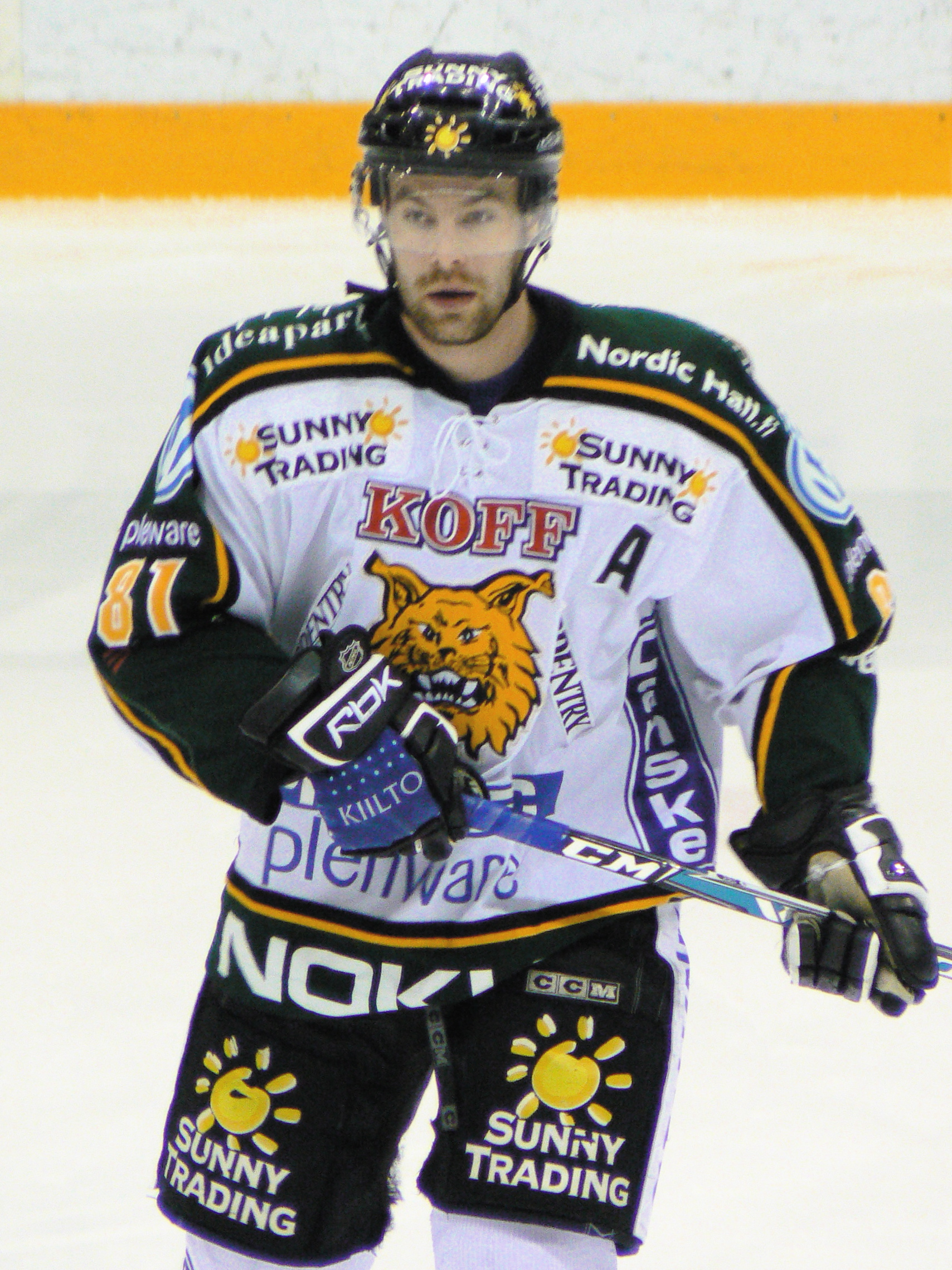
Arto Tukio

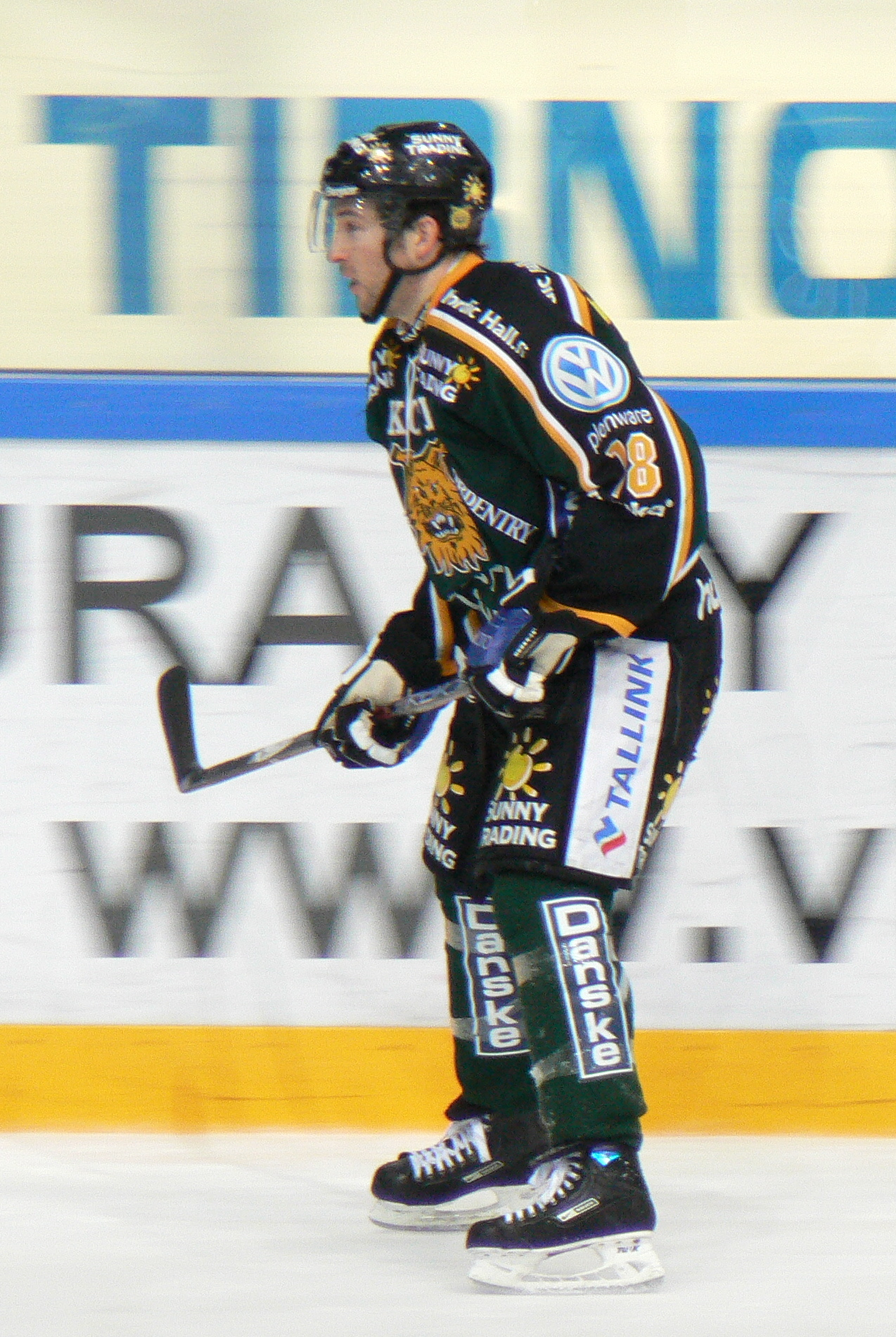
Cameron Mann

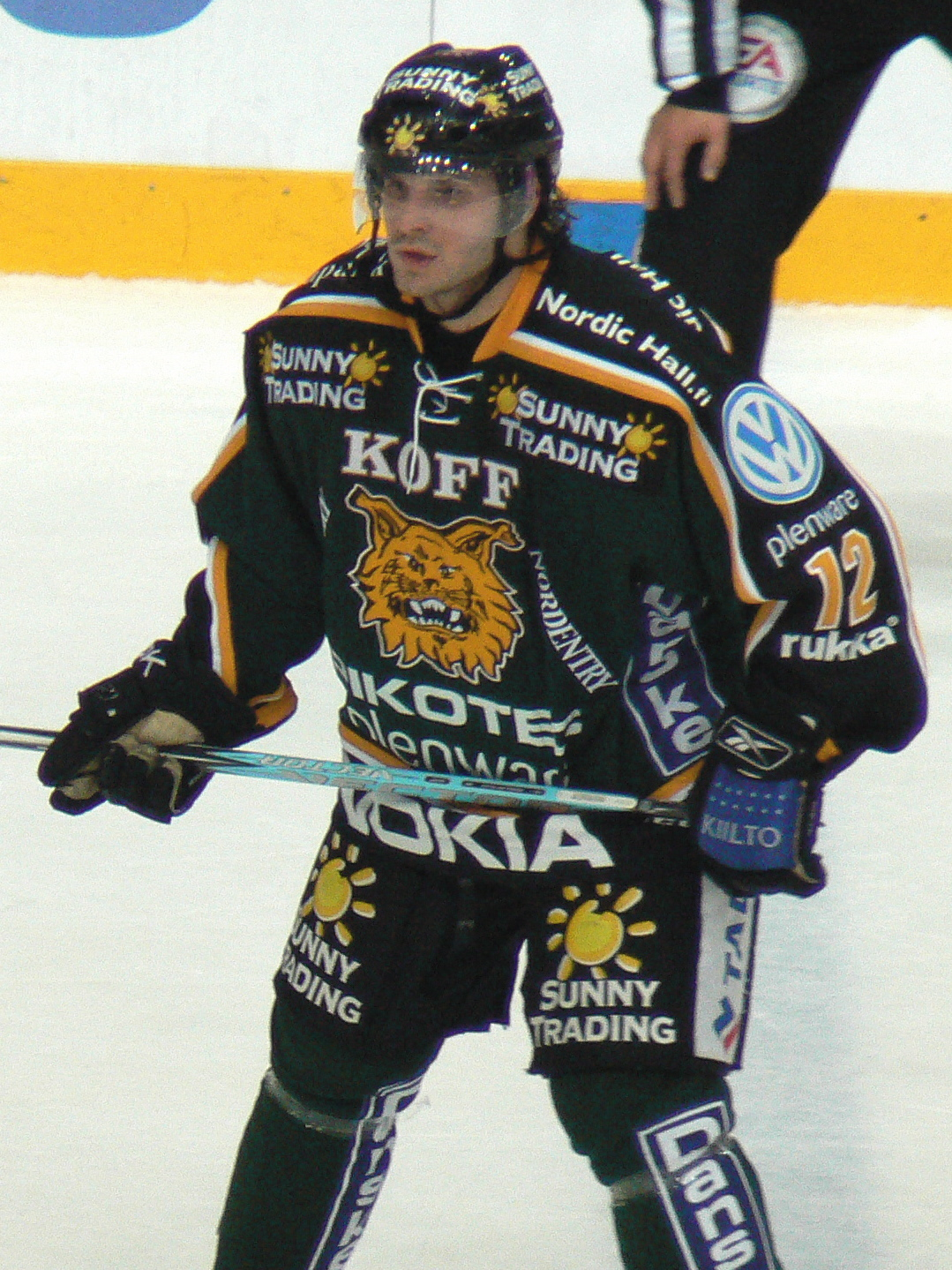
Eric Werner

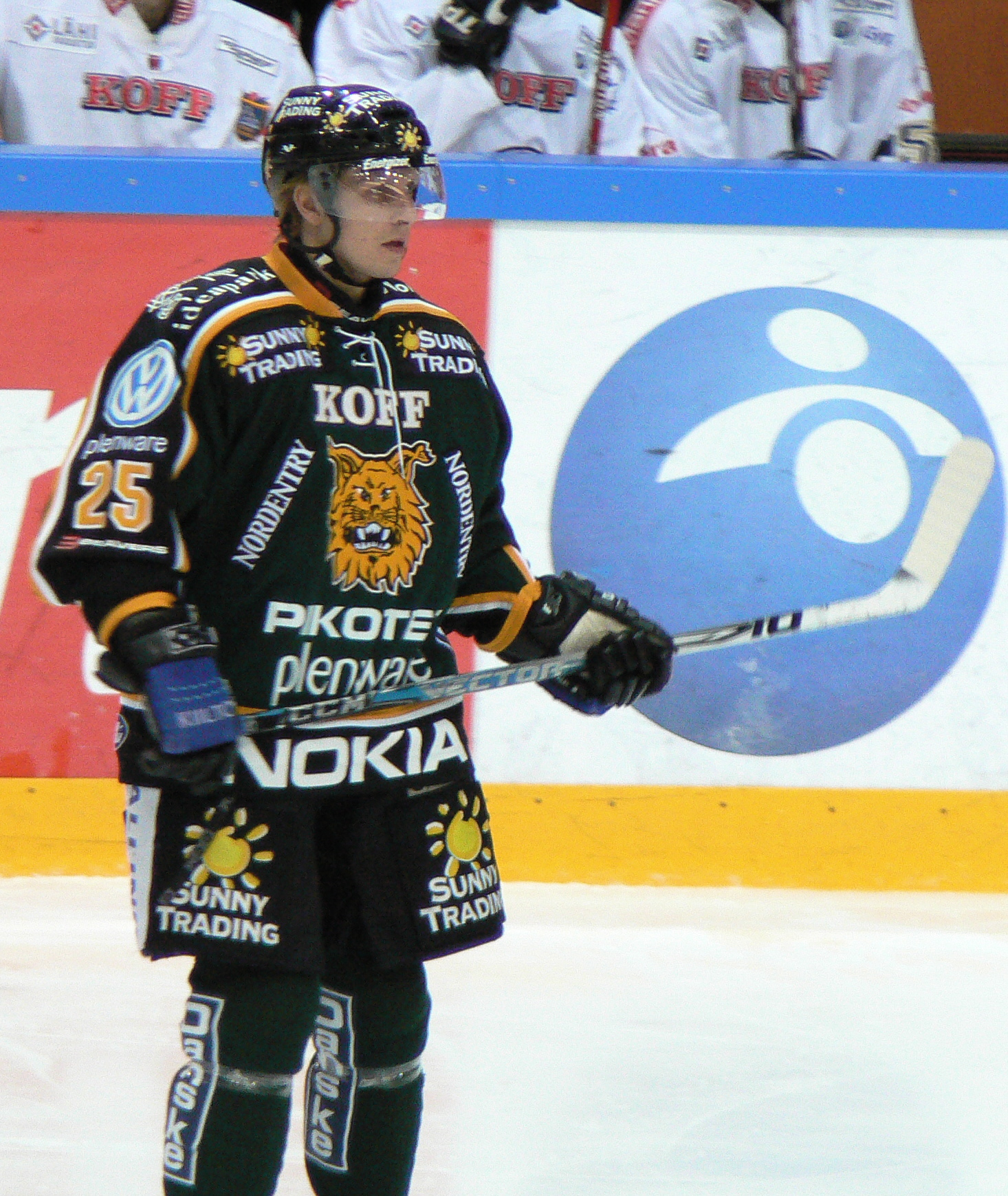
Mika Niskanen

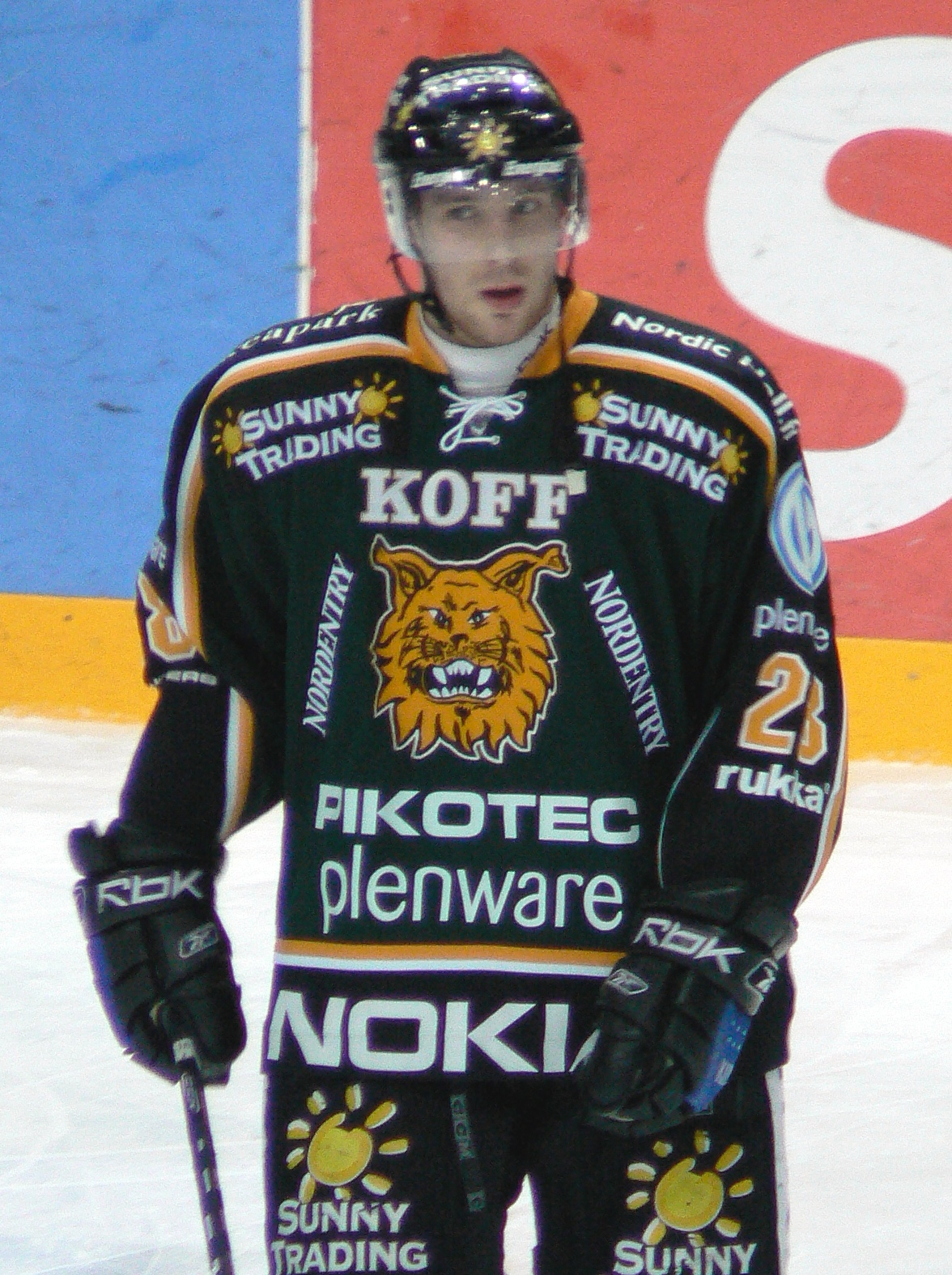
Jakub Koreis

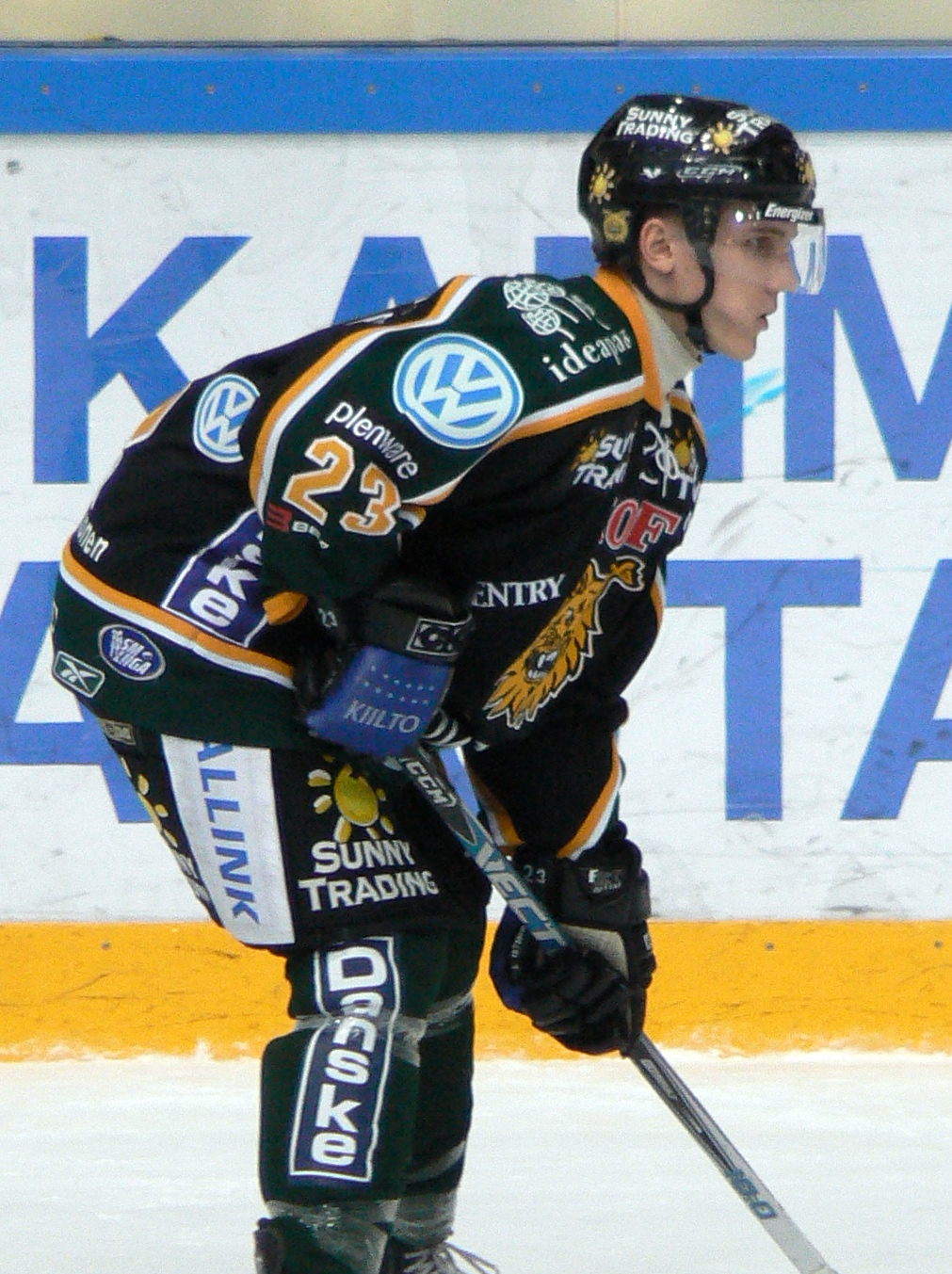
Jarkko Näppilä

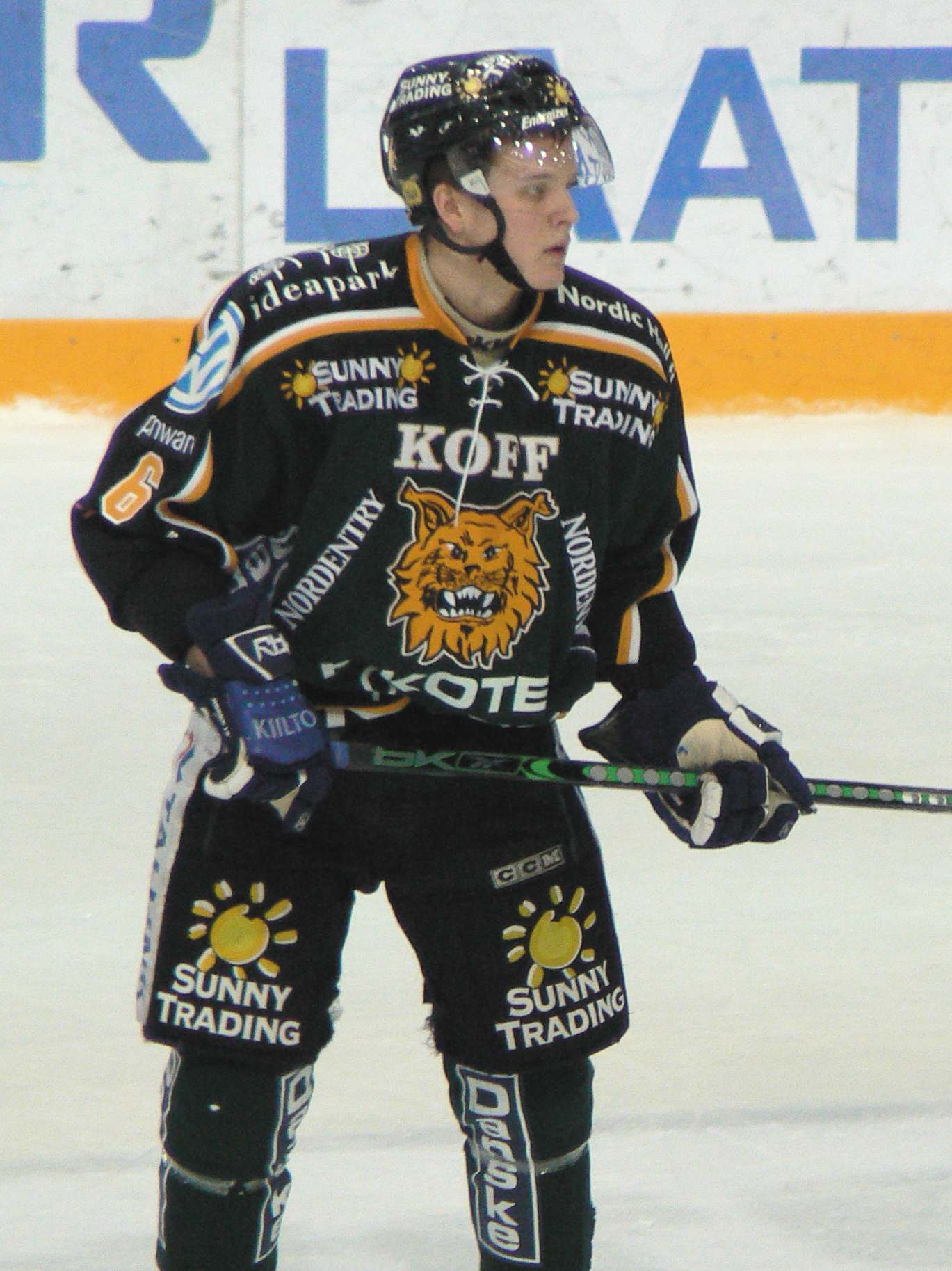
Joonas Lehtivuori

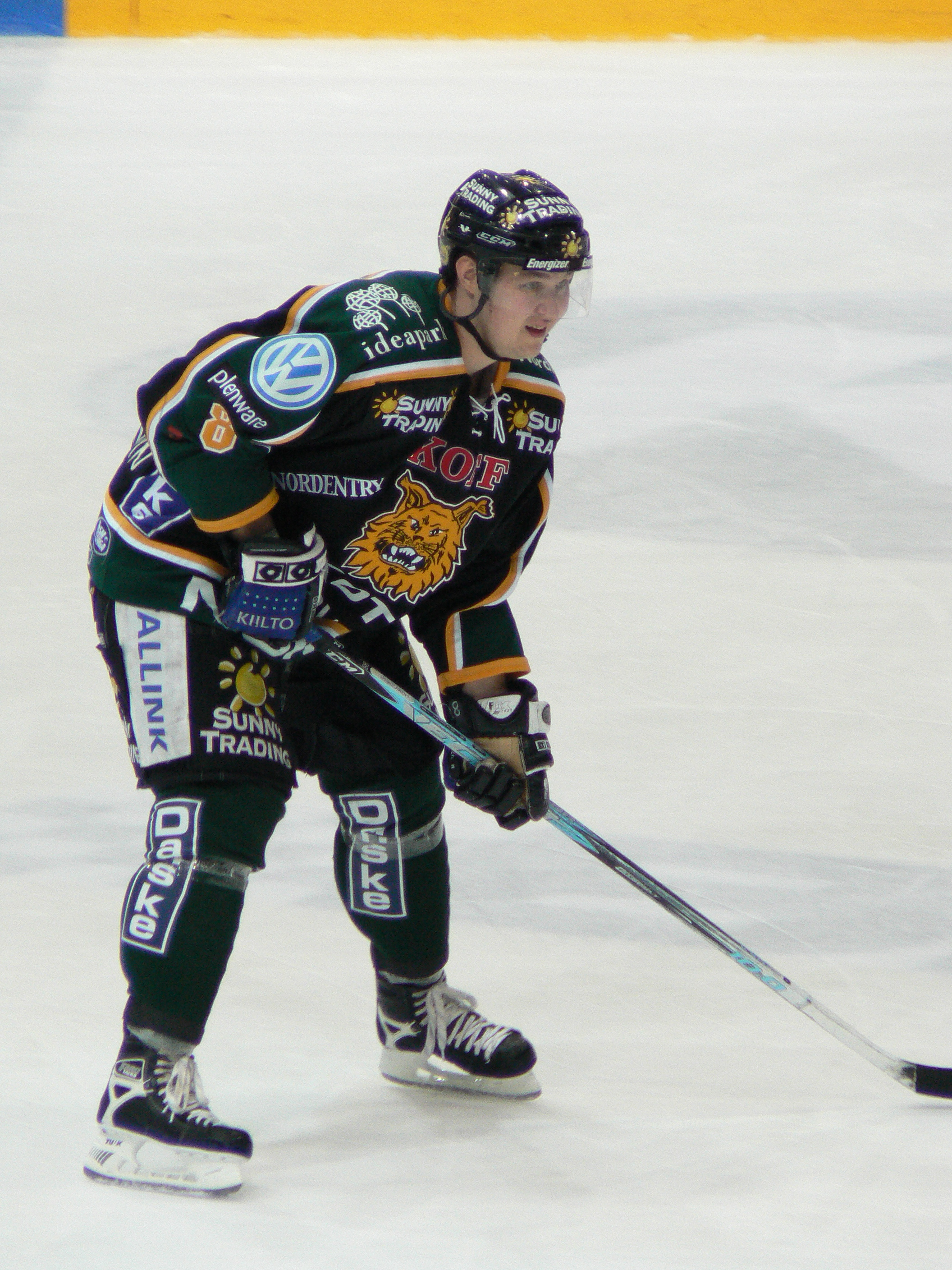
Teemu Jääskeläinen

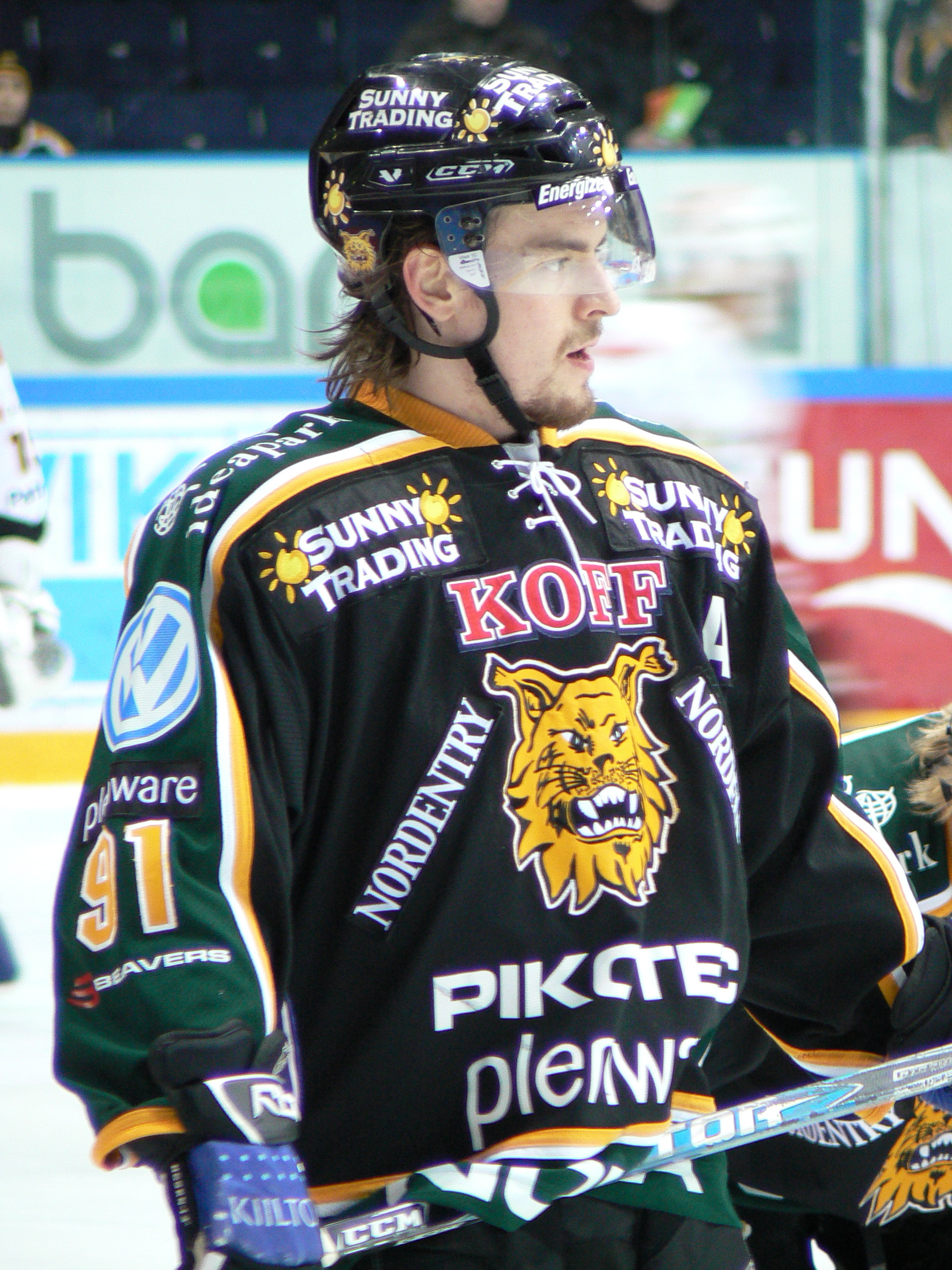
Turo Järvinen

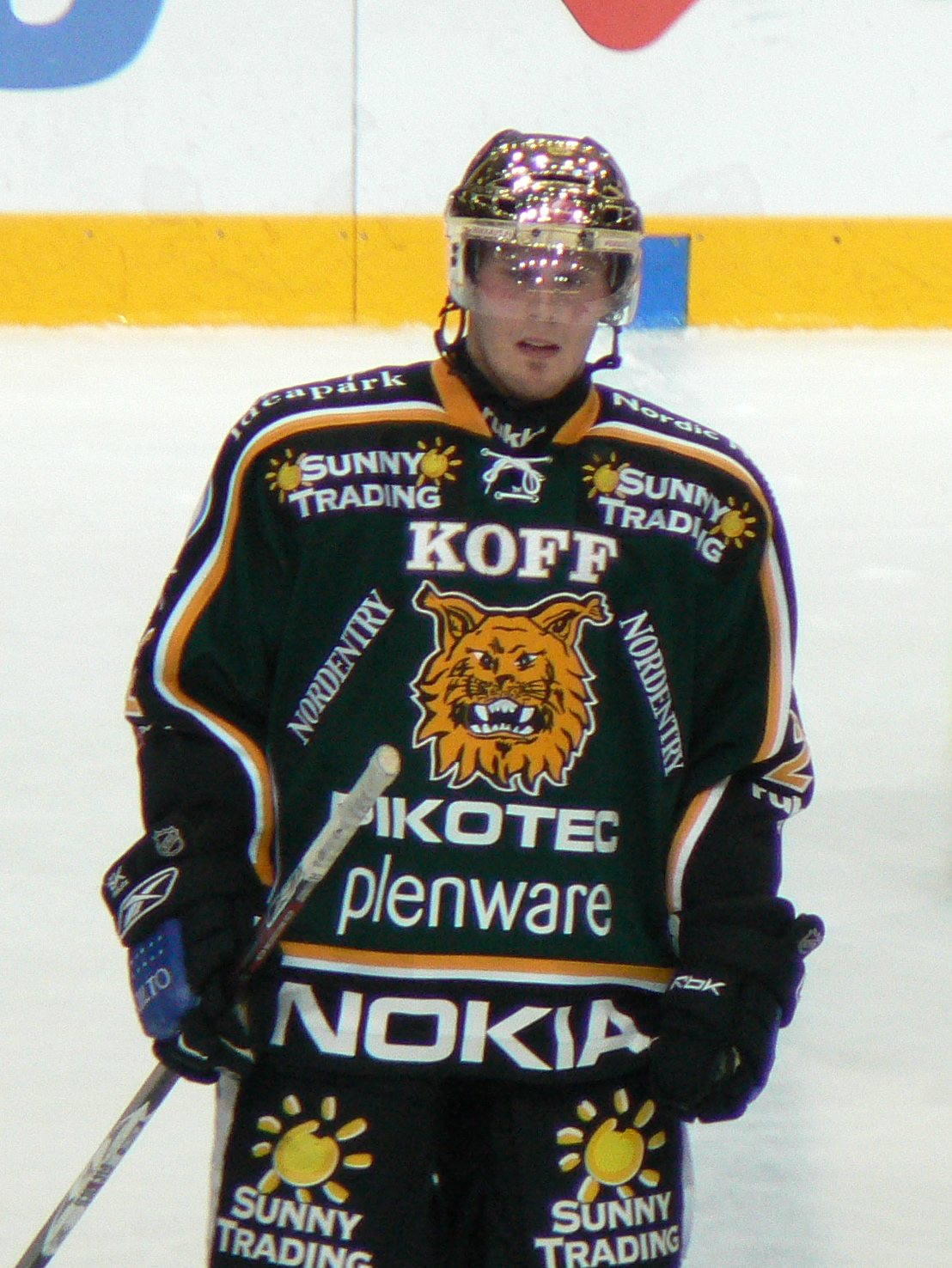
Toni Koivisto

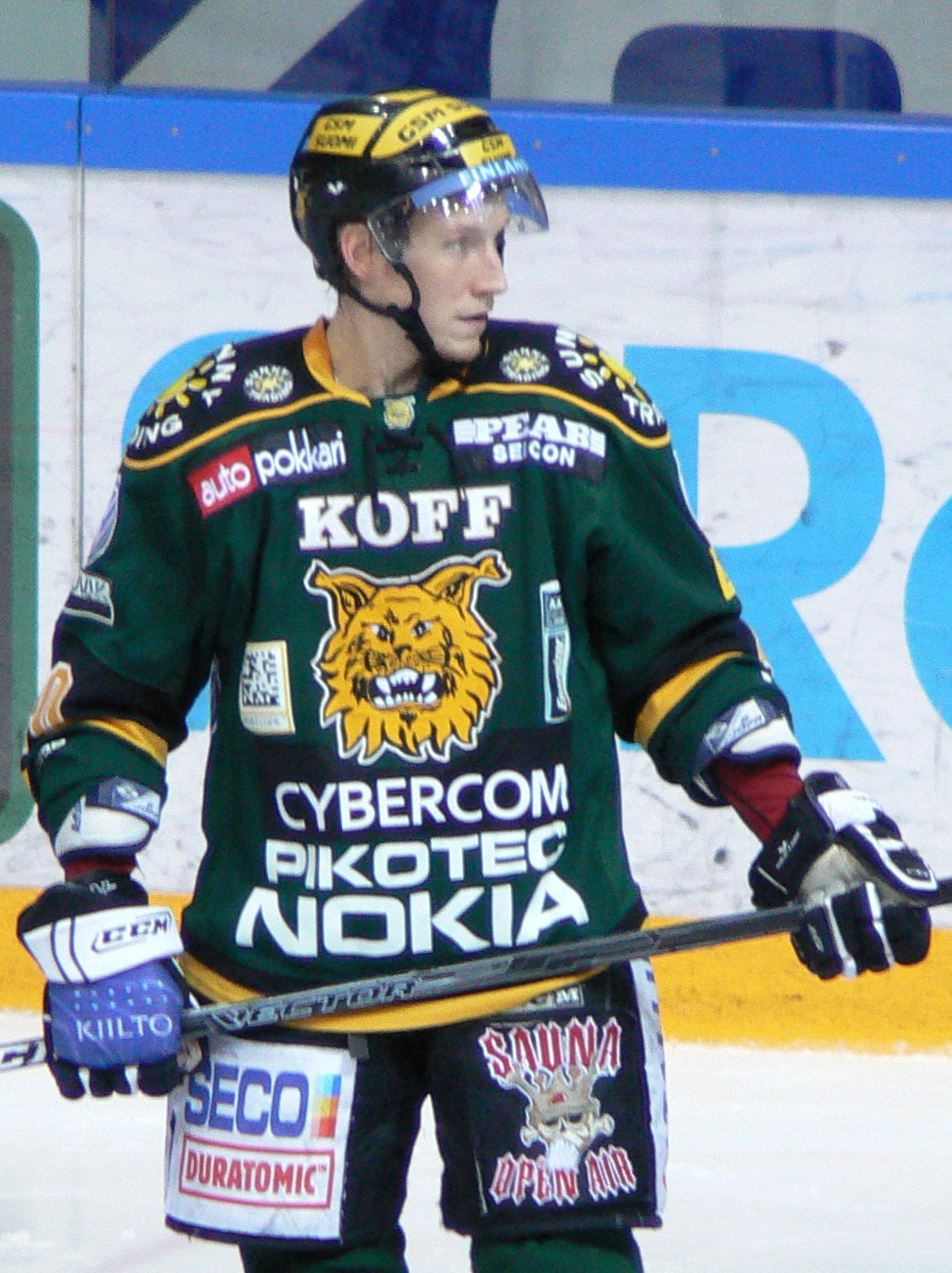
Jarkko Kauvosaari

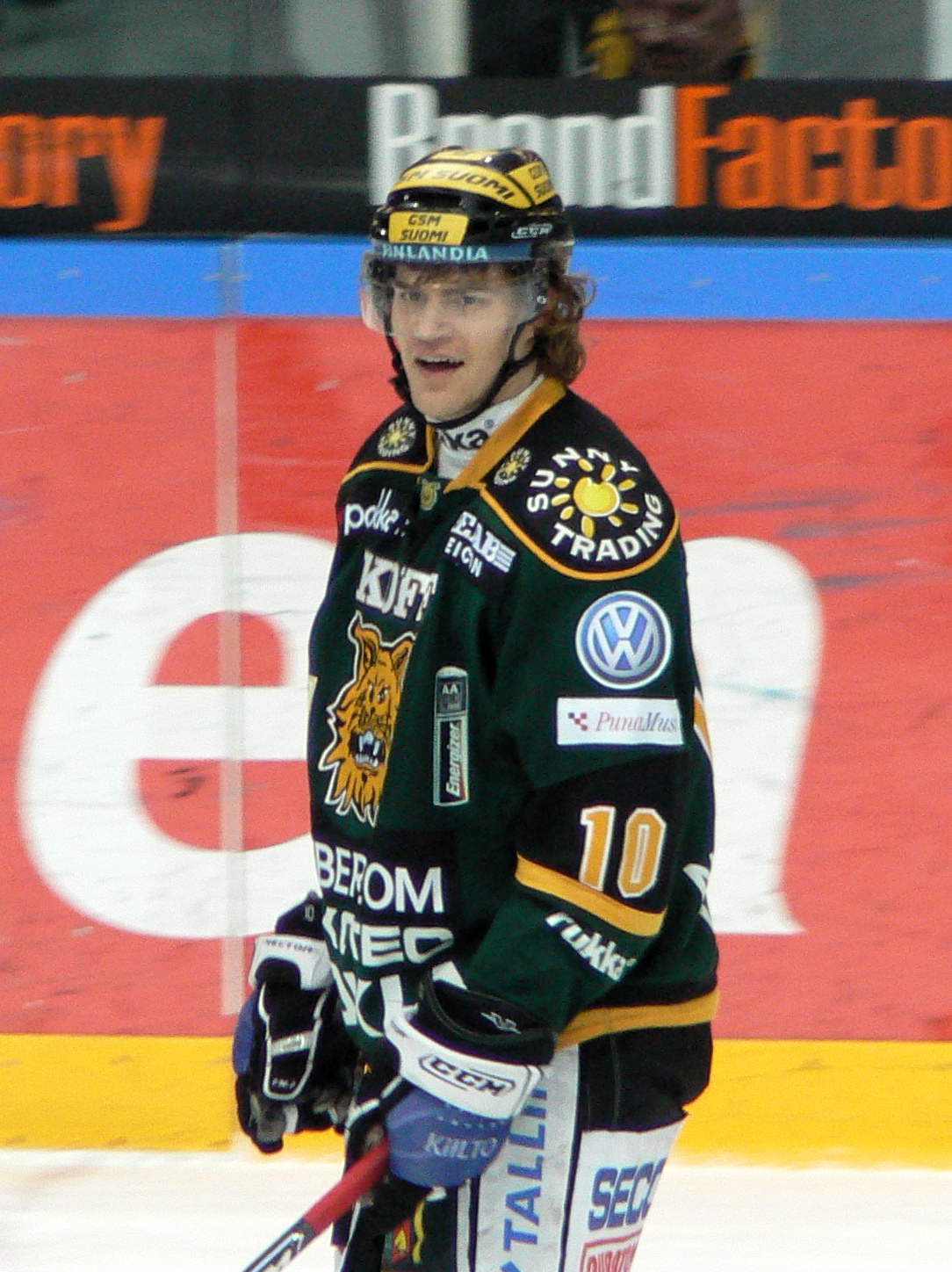
Matti Uusivirta

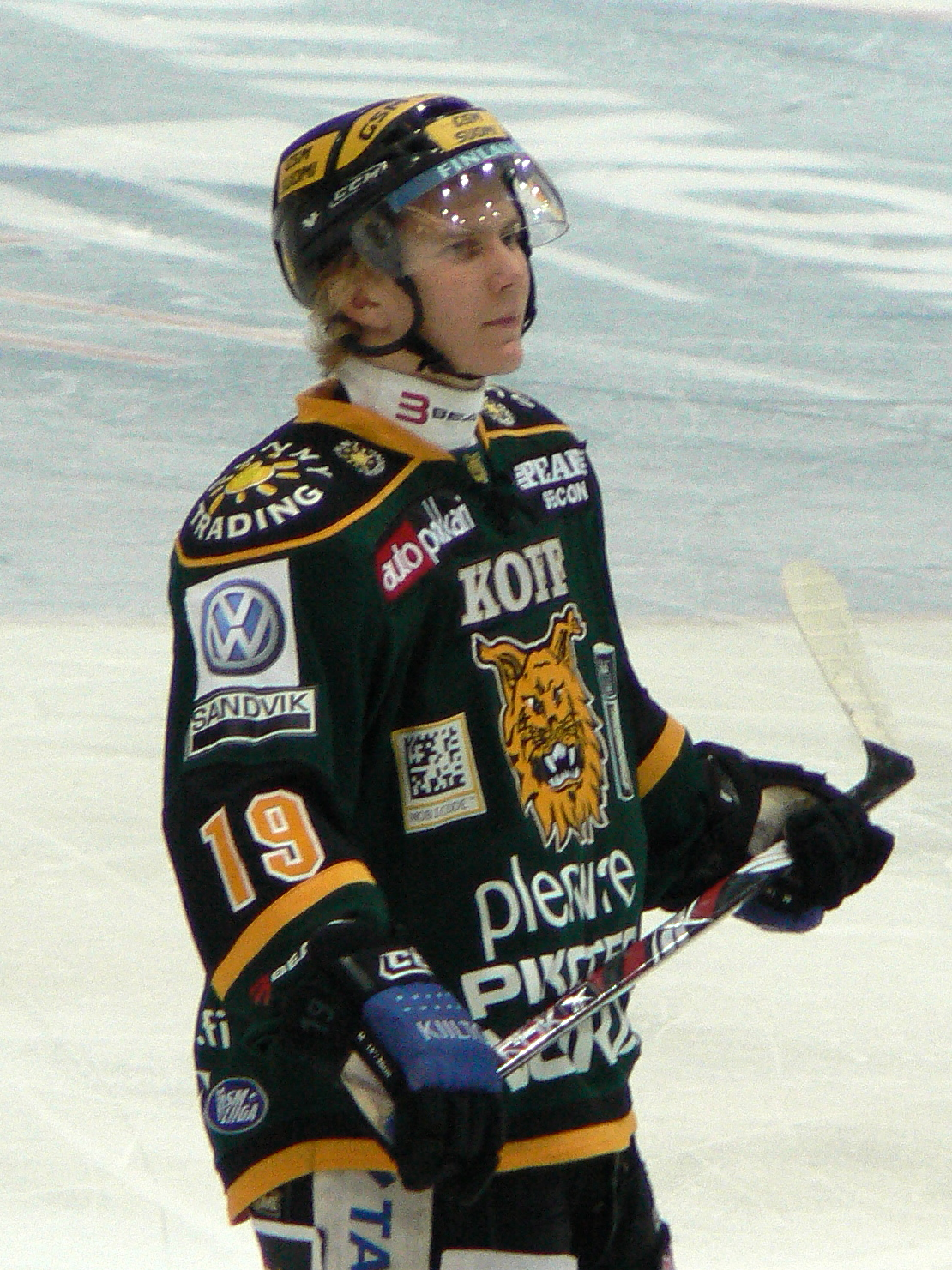
Mikko Kuukka

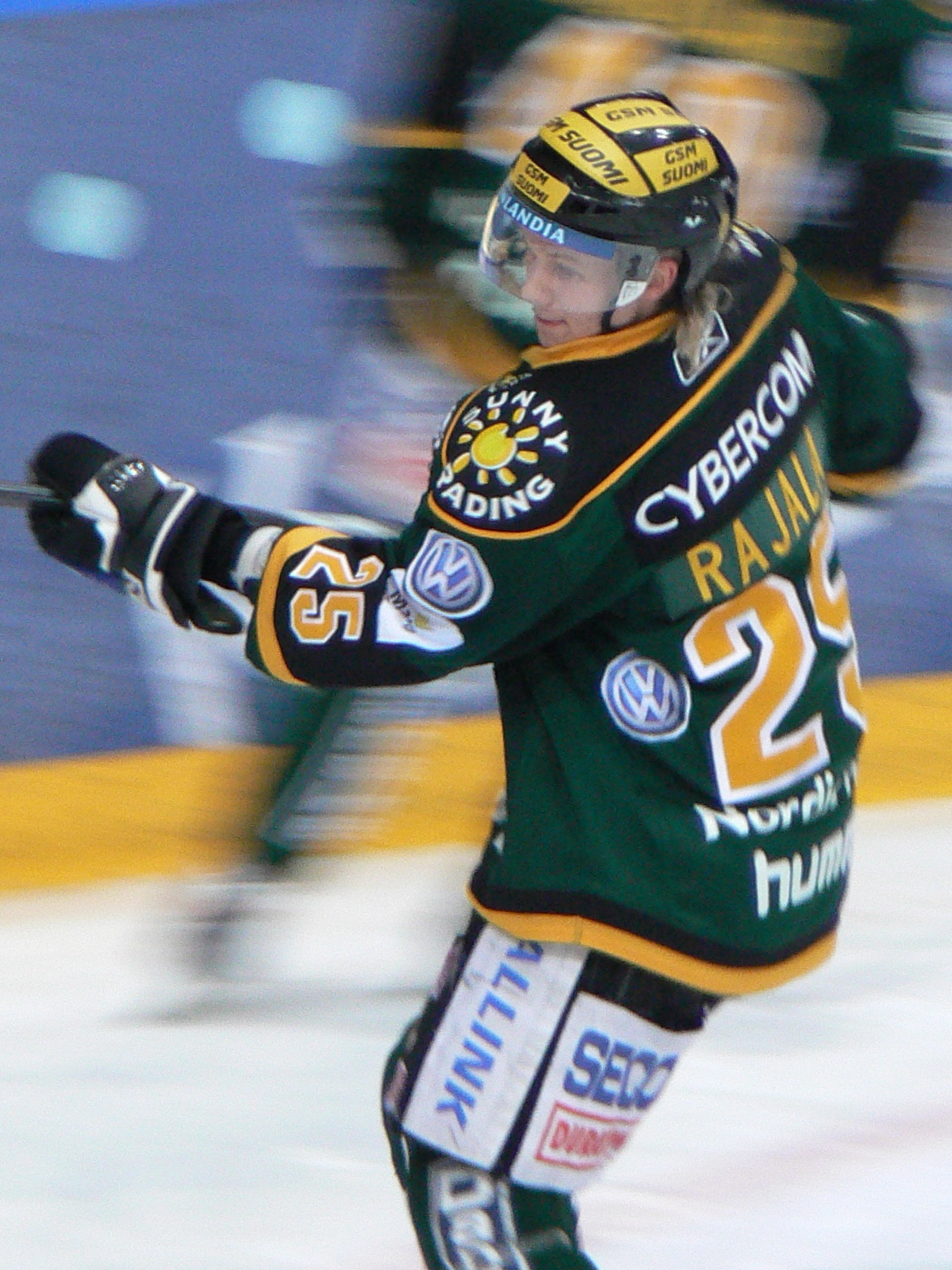
Toni Rajala

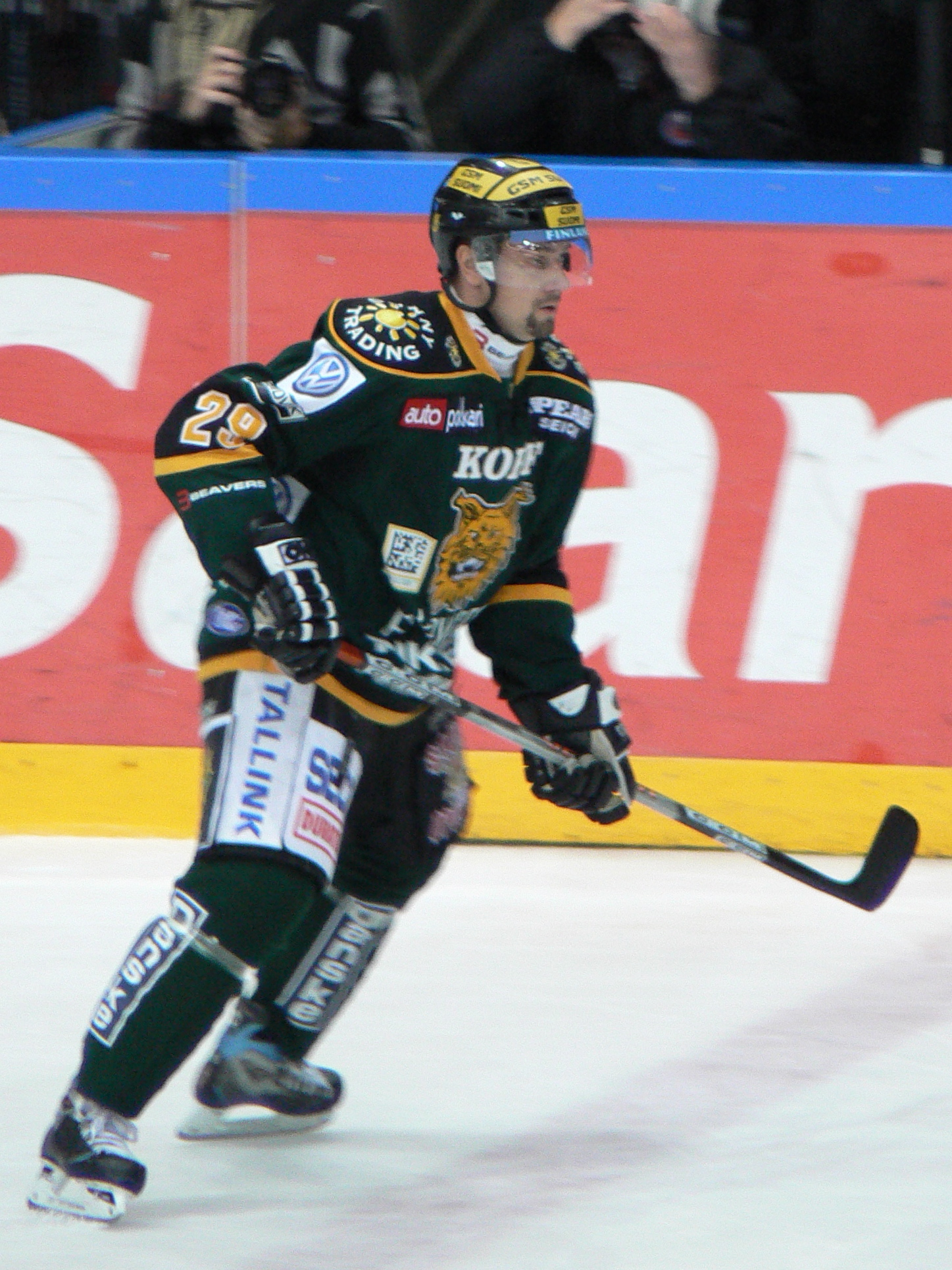
Jani Keinänen

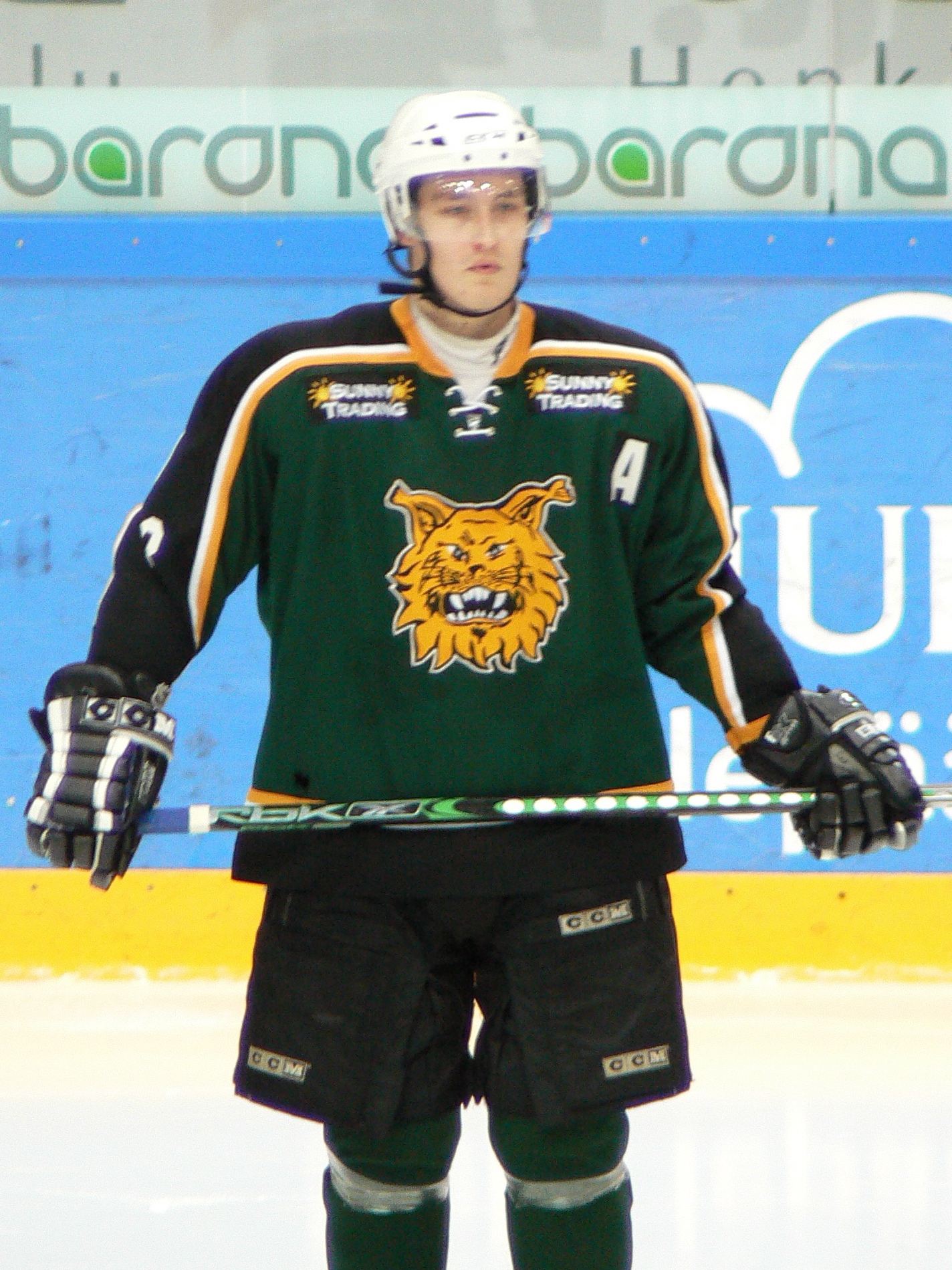
Jouni Aalto

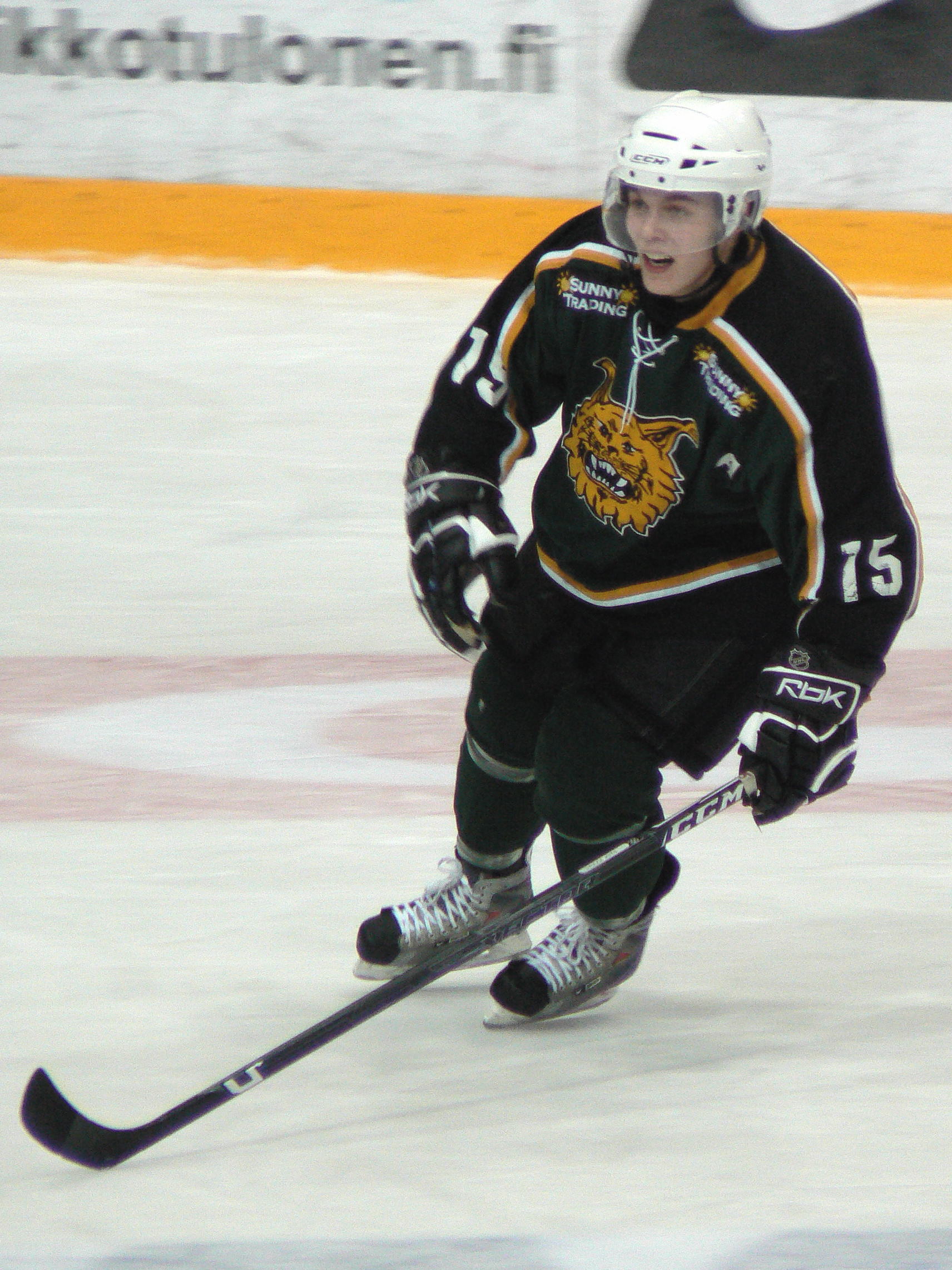
Joonas Rask

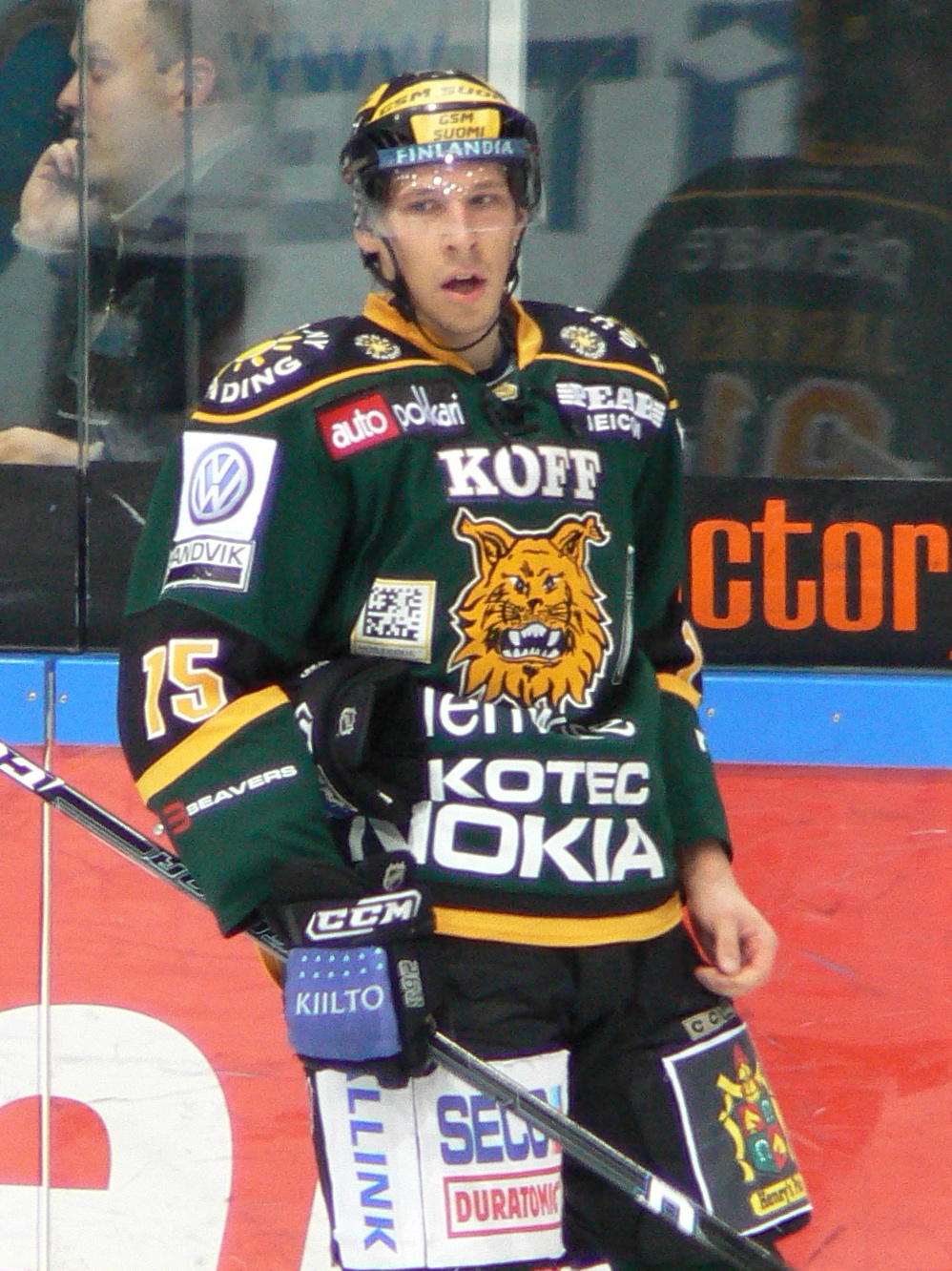
Masi Marjamäki

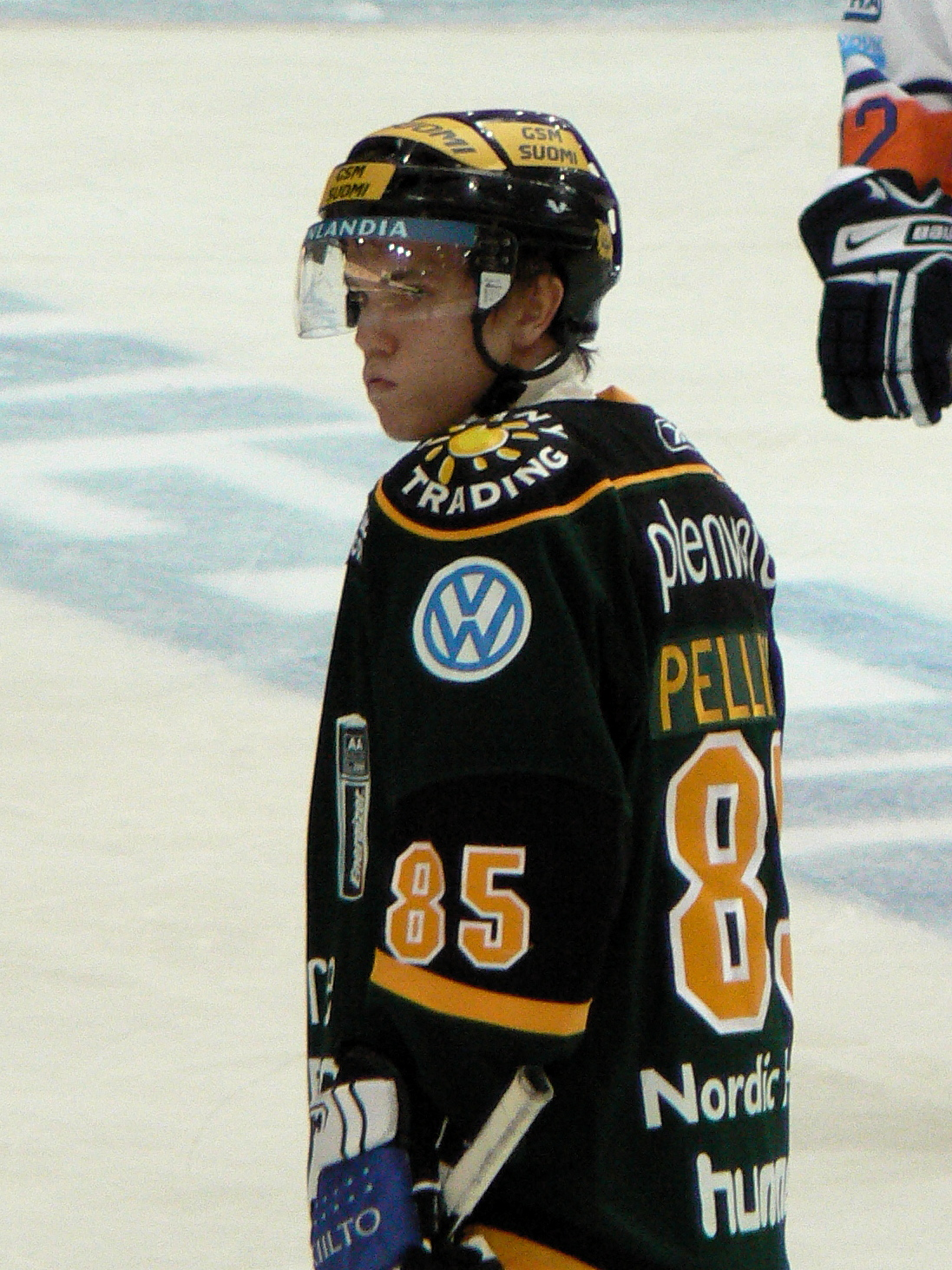
Jaakko Pellinen

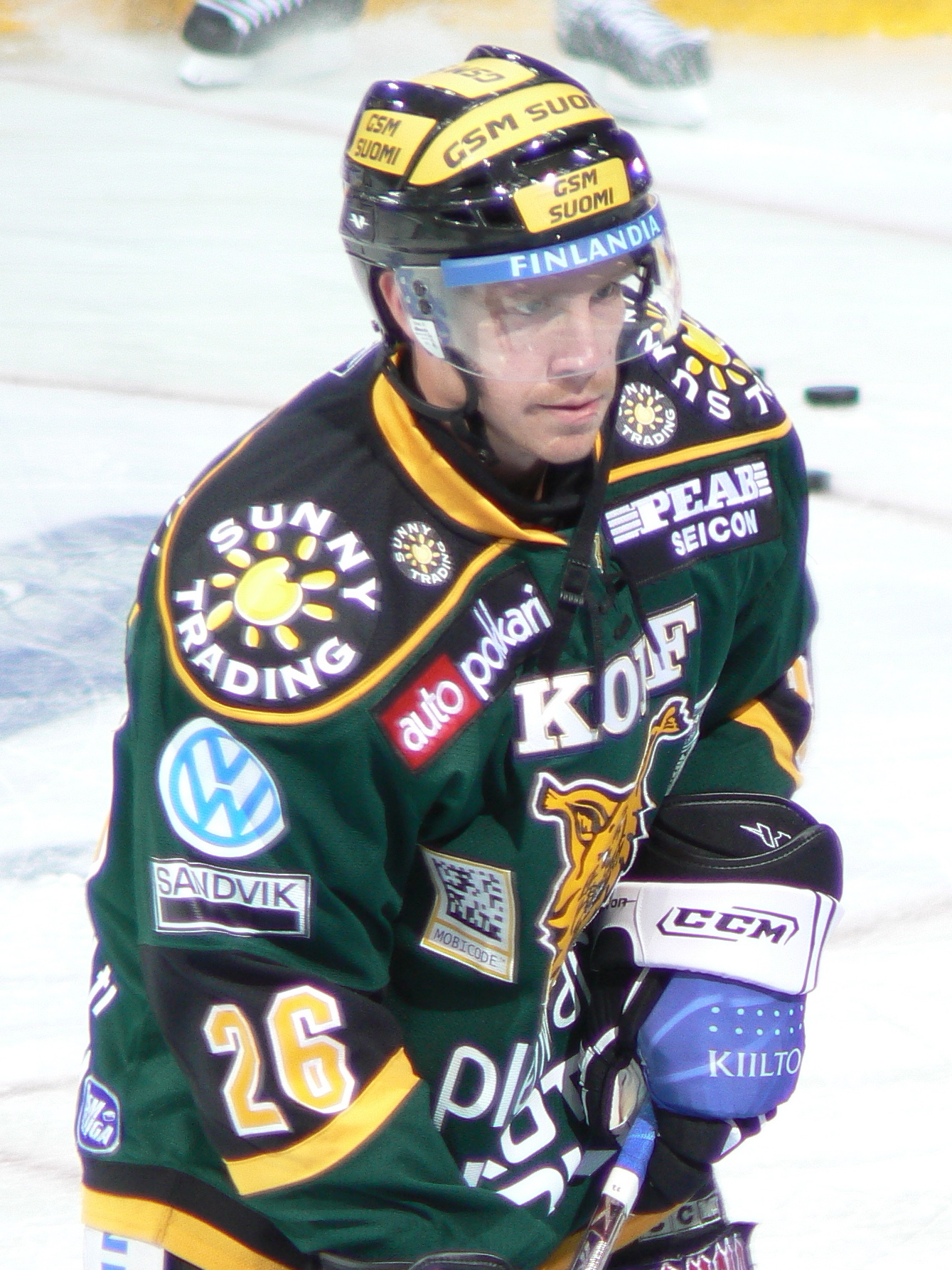
Colby Genoway

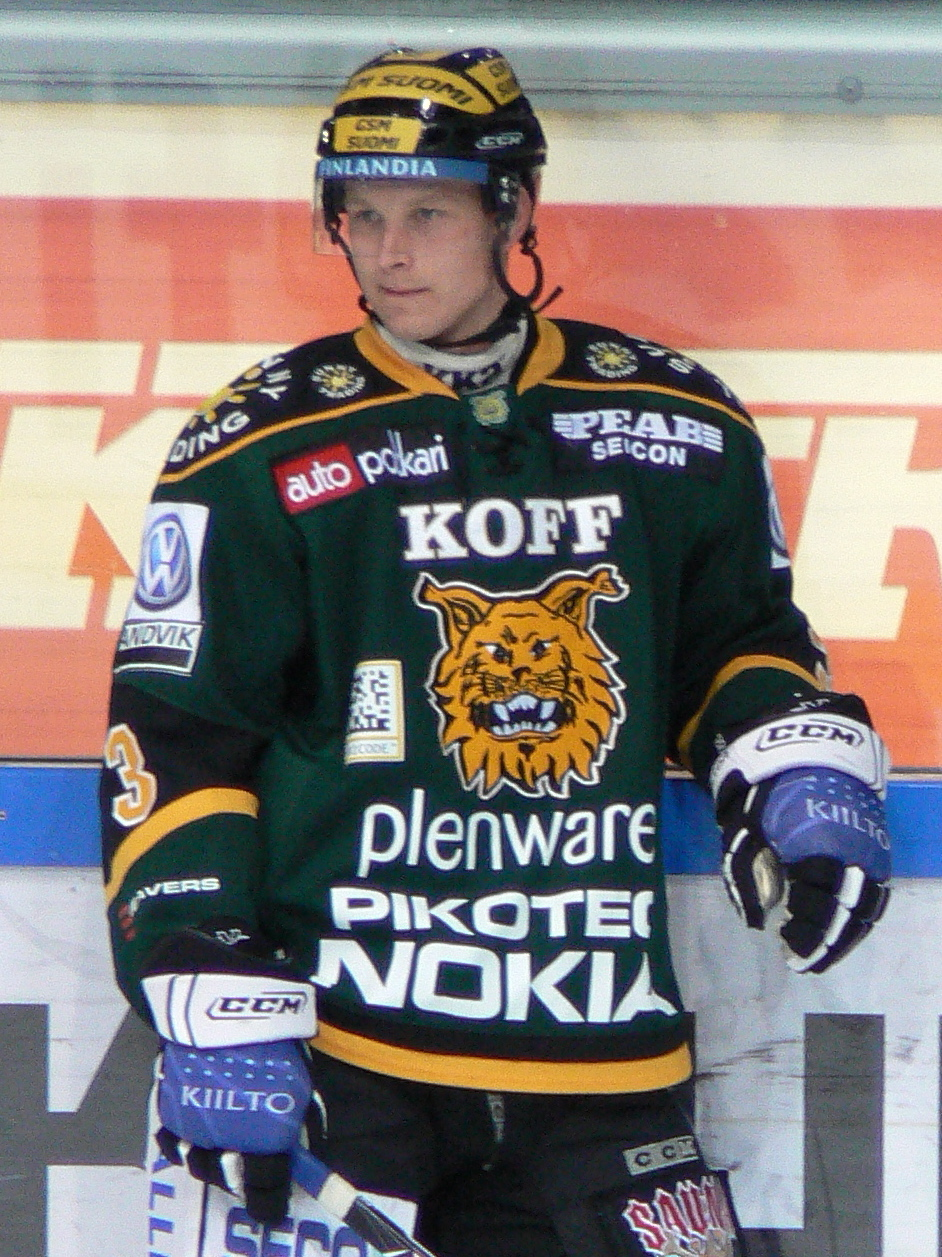
Toni Niemi

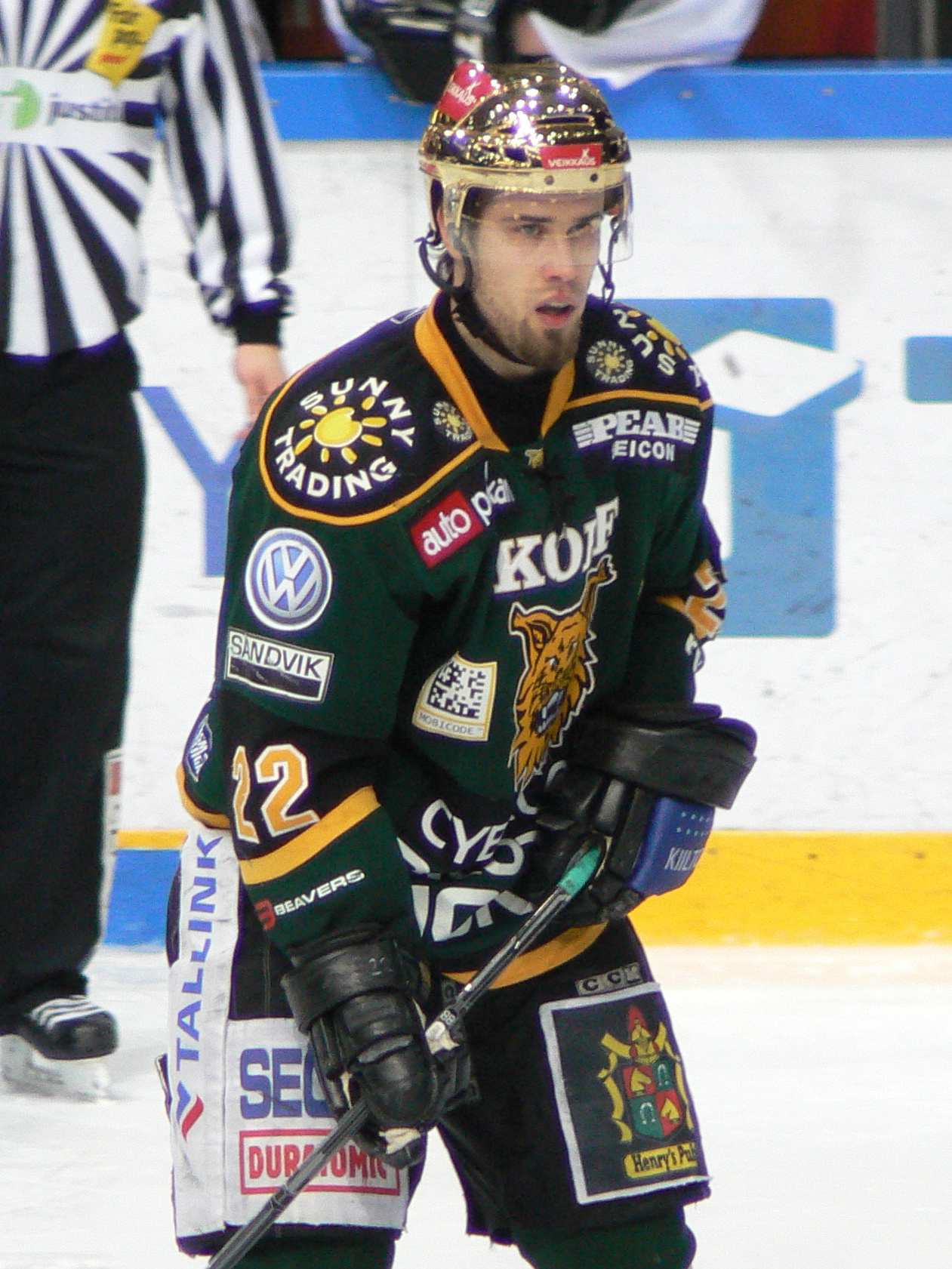
Markus Seikola

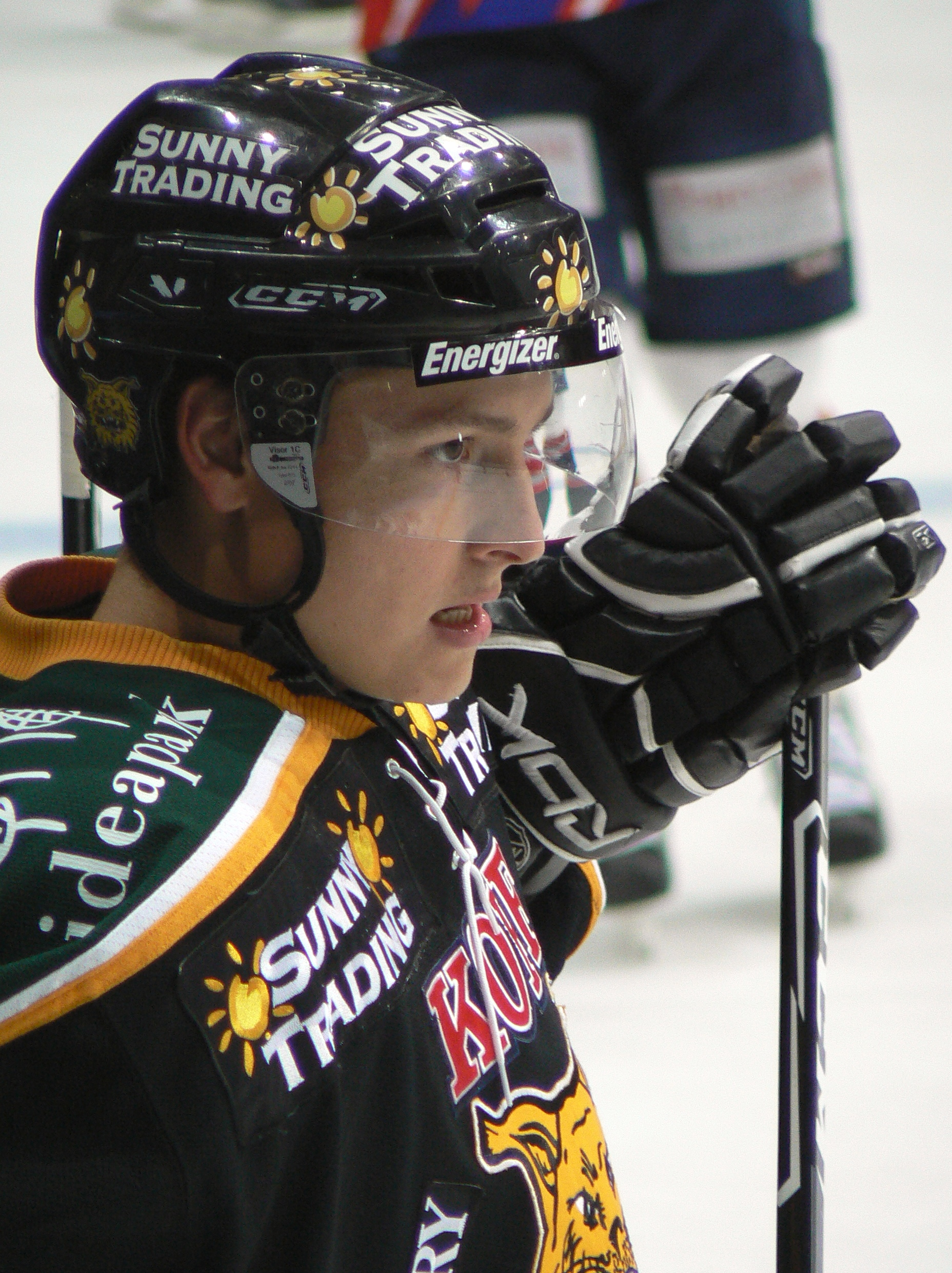
Antti Roppo

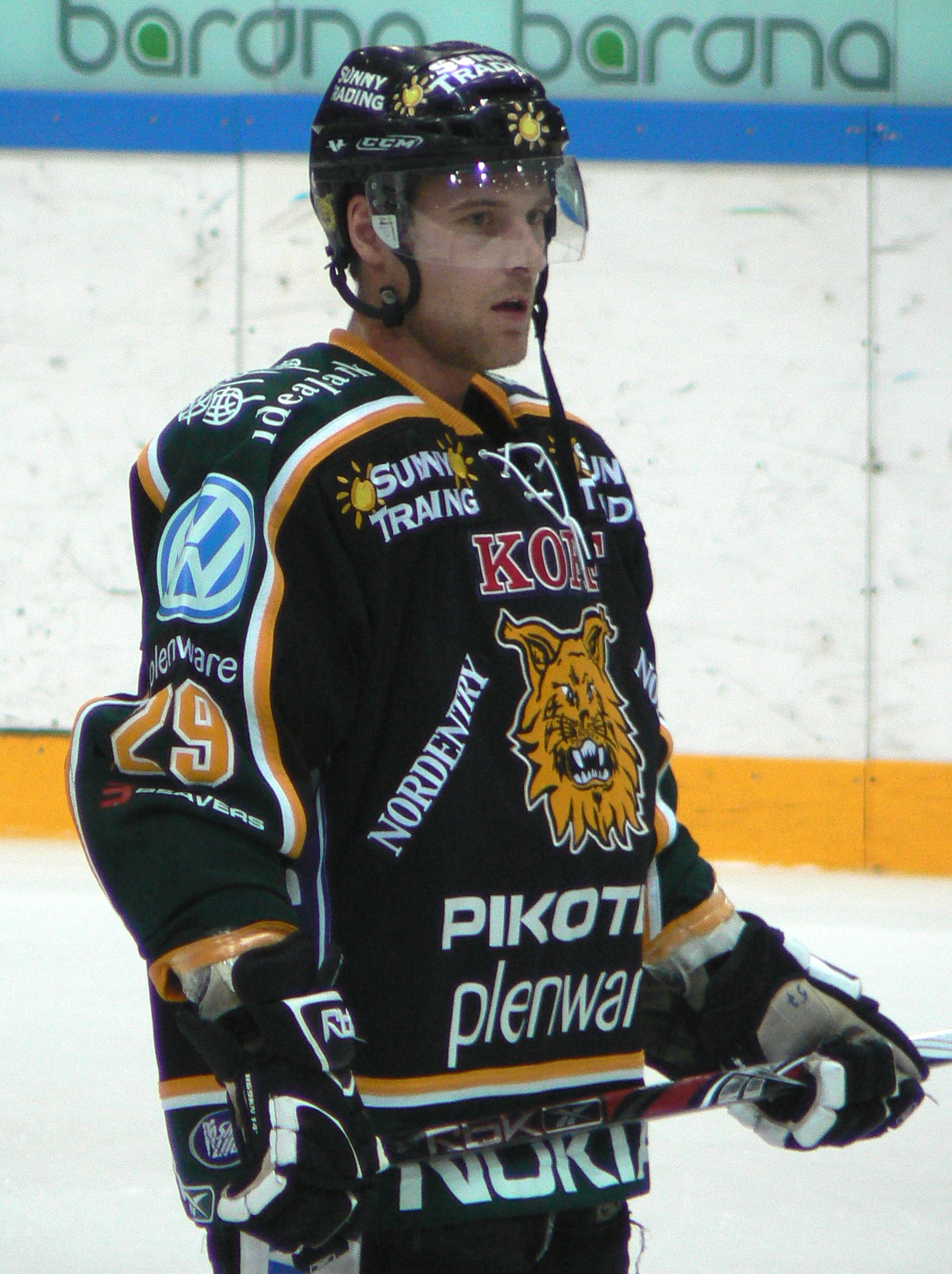
Dan Hacker

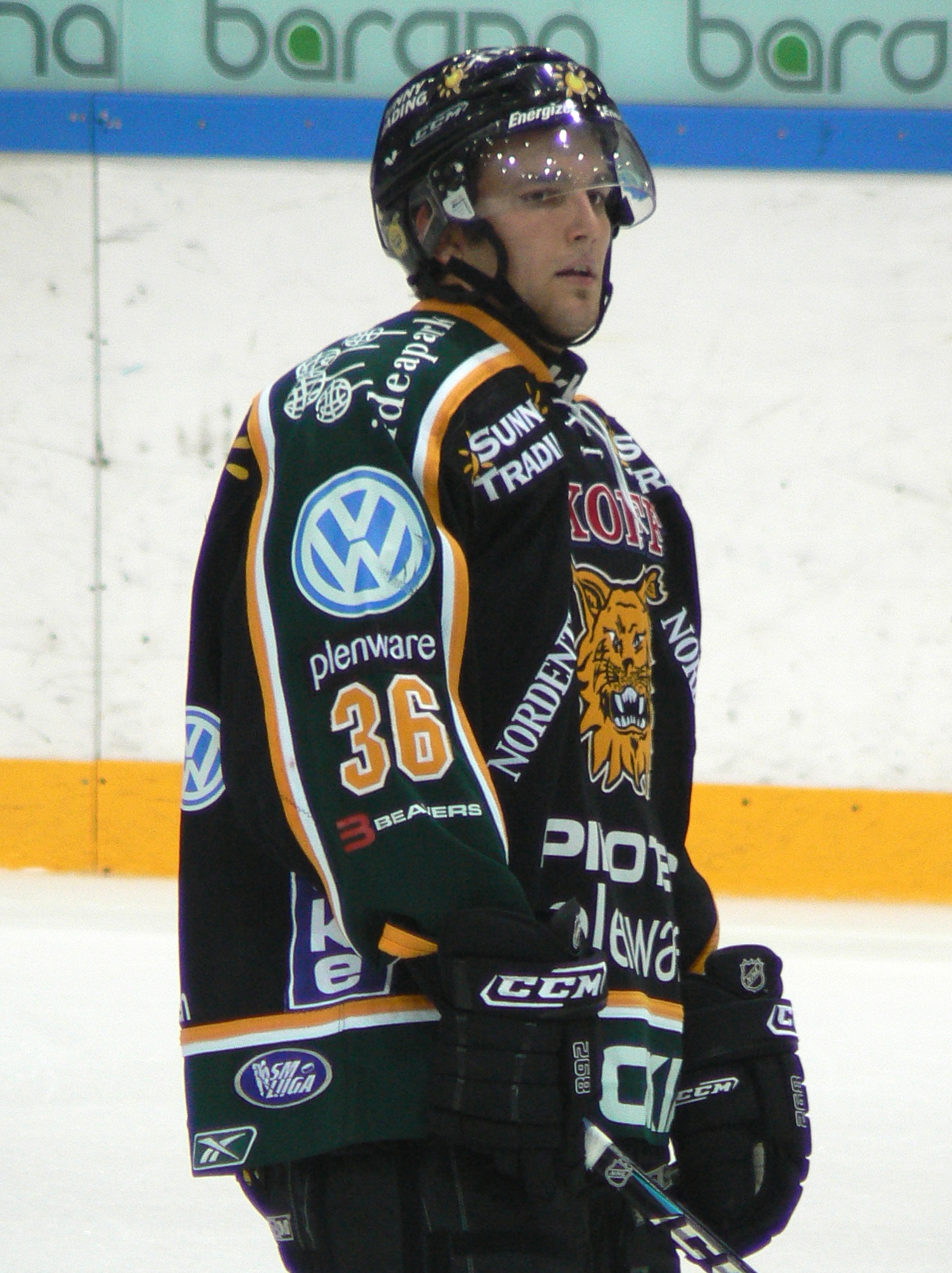
Lassi Mattila

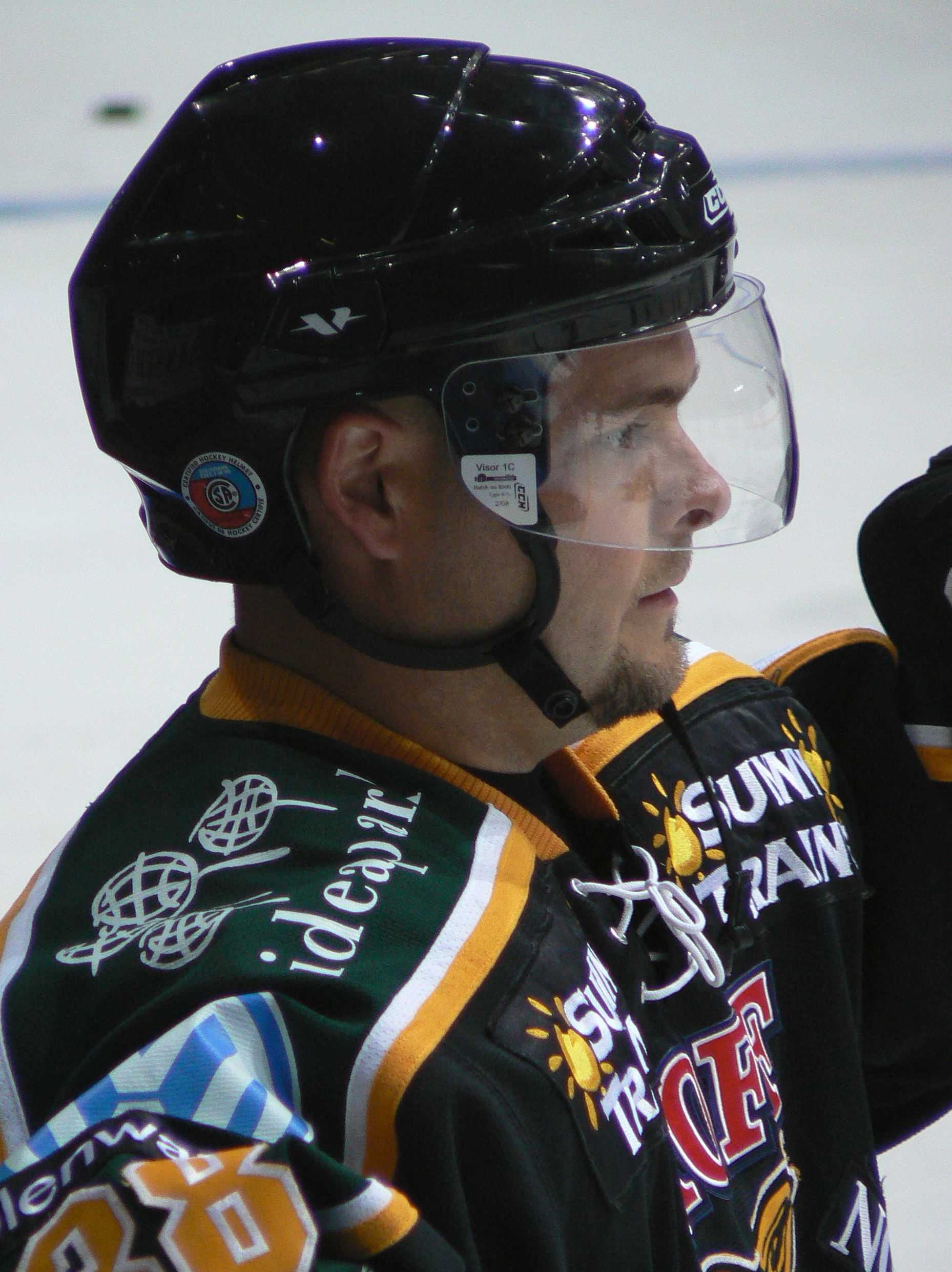
Pasi Järvinen

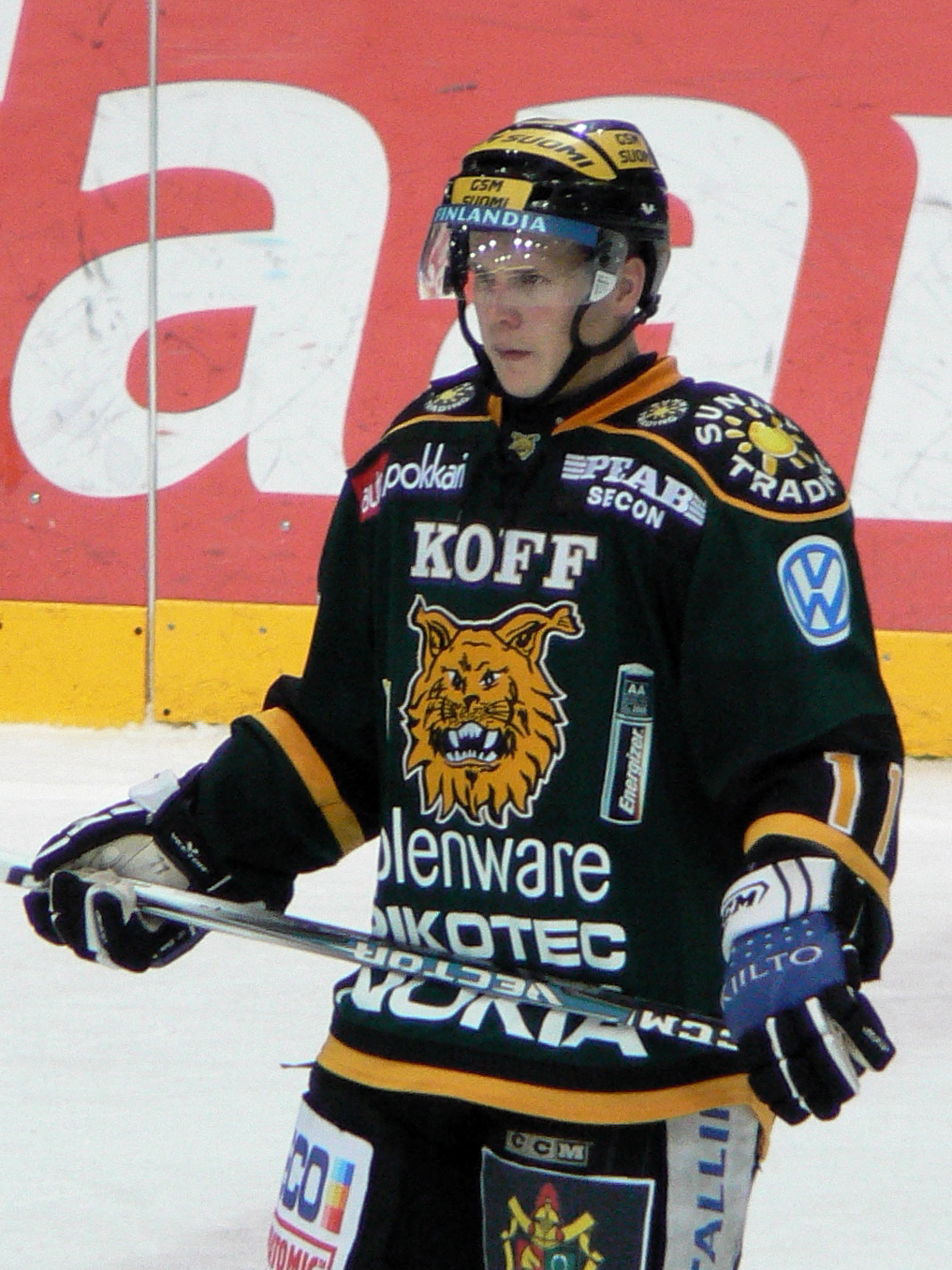
Miikka Männikkö

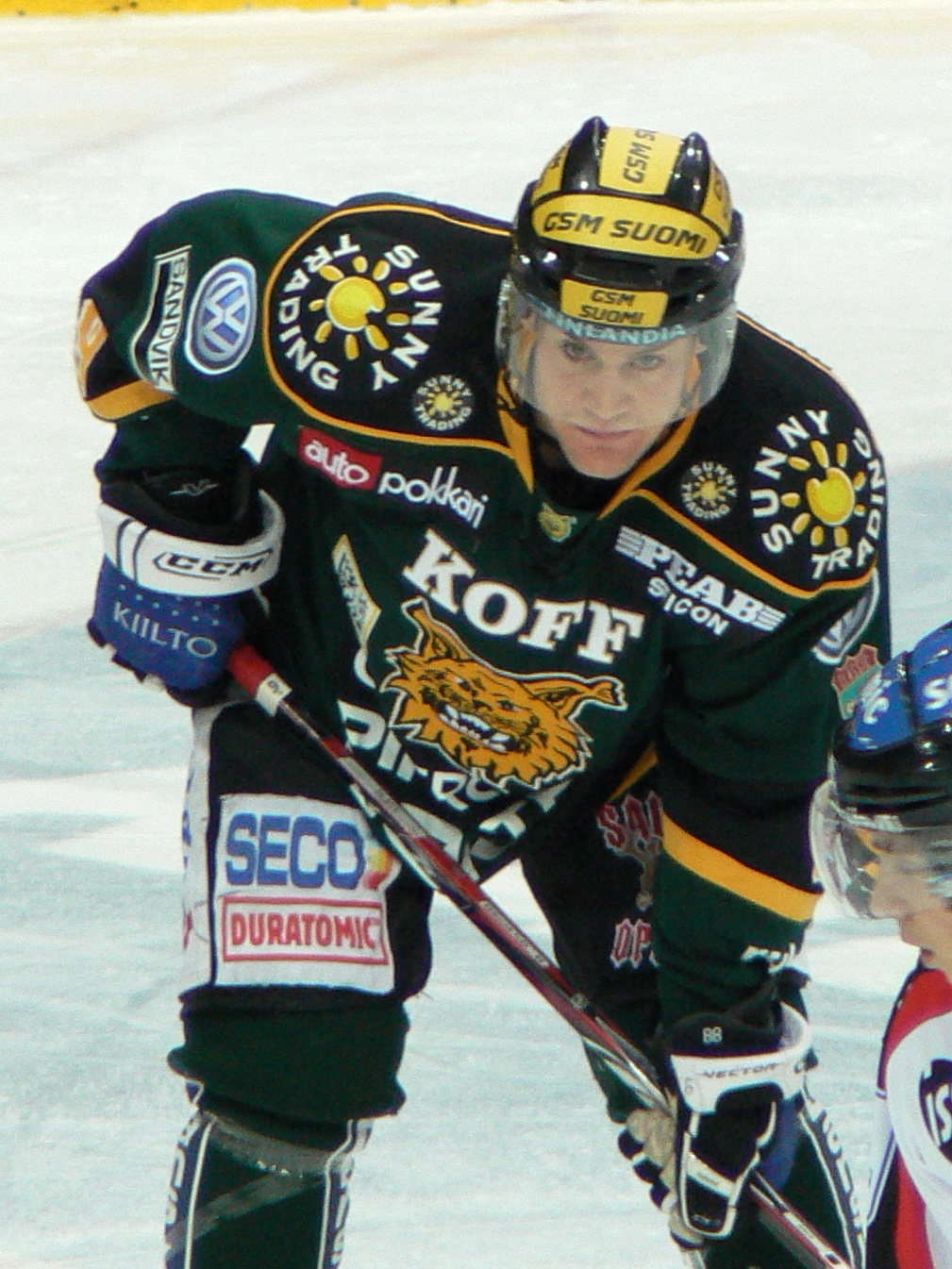
Geoff Platt

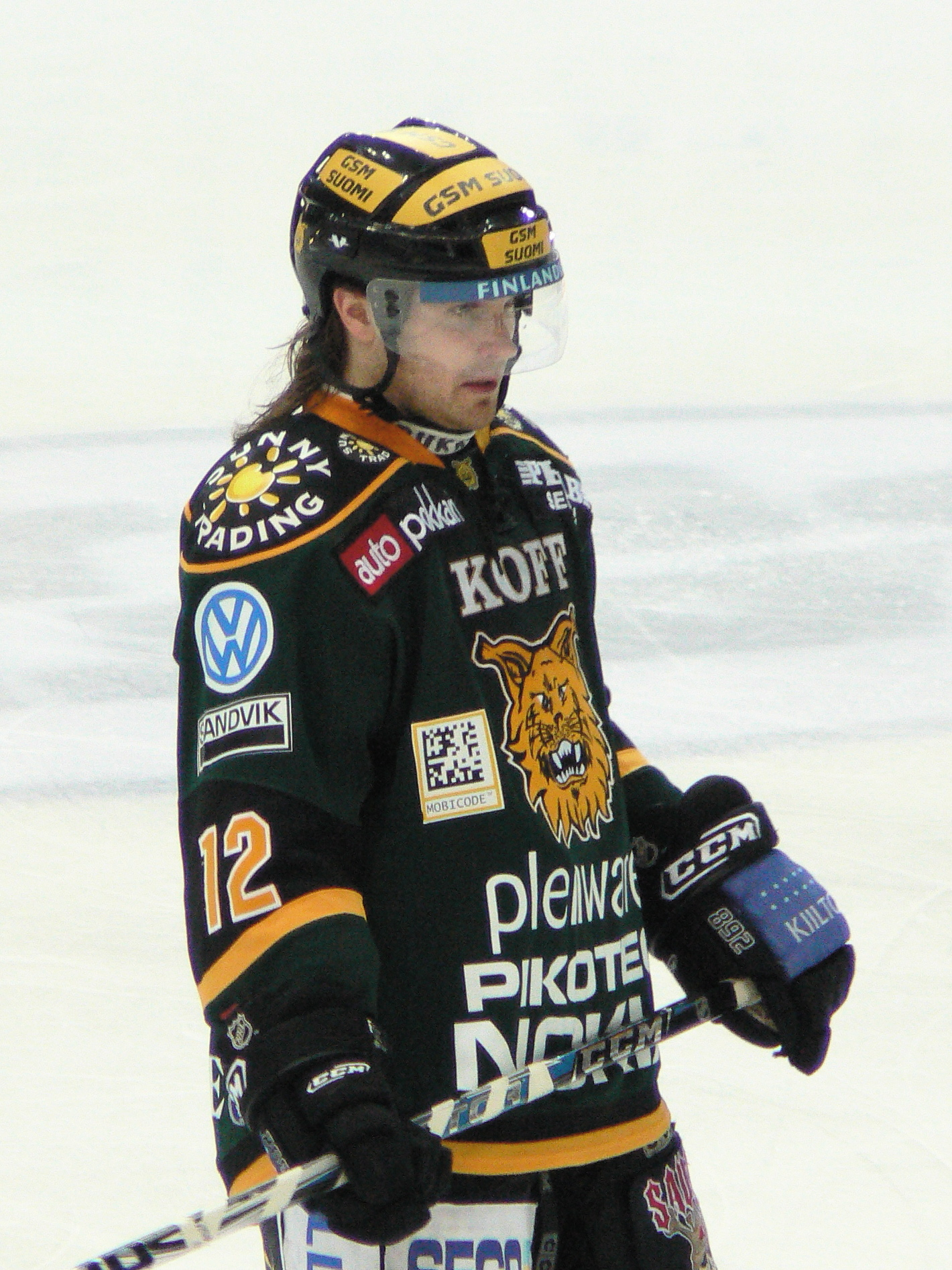
Troy Milam

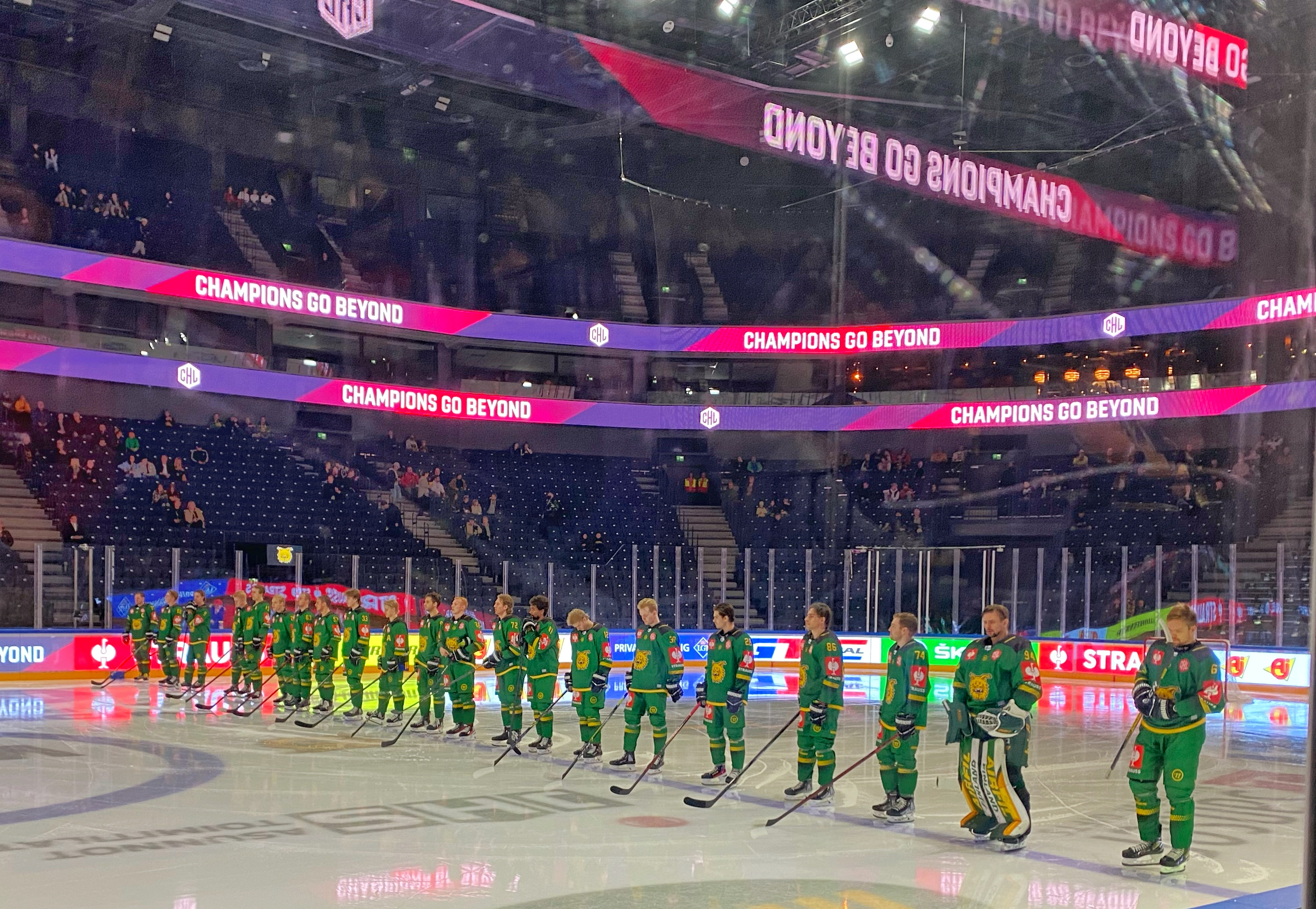
(2022)

== Other sports ==
In addition to hockey and football, Ilves has a futsal team in Finnish league which has won the Finnish championship five times (2004, 2005, 2007, 2010, and 2011) and the cup competition twice (2006, 2010), a floorball team at second highest level and a ringette team competing in the SM Ringette league. It has numerous boys' and girls' junior teams in ice hockey, soccer, floorball (boys only), and ringette (girls only), making the organization the largest sports club in Finland.

In the past, Ilves has also competed in American football, basketball, bowling, figure skating, handball, and volleyball. It has won a bronze medal in American football and a silver one in handball. Also, Ilves has won the Finnish Cup in handball.

== See also ==
- Tappara
- Koovee
