= List of Florida Panthers draft picks =

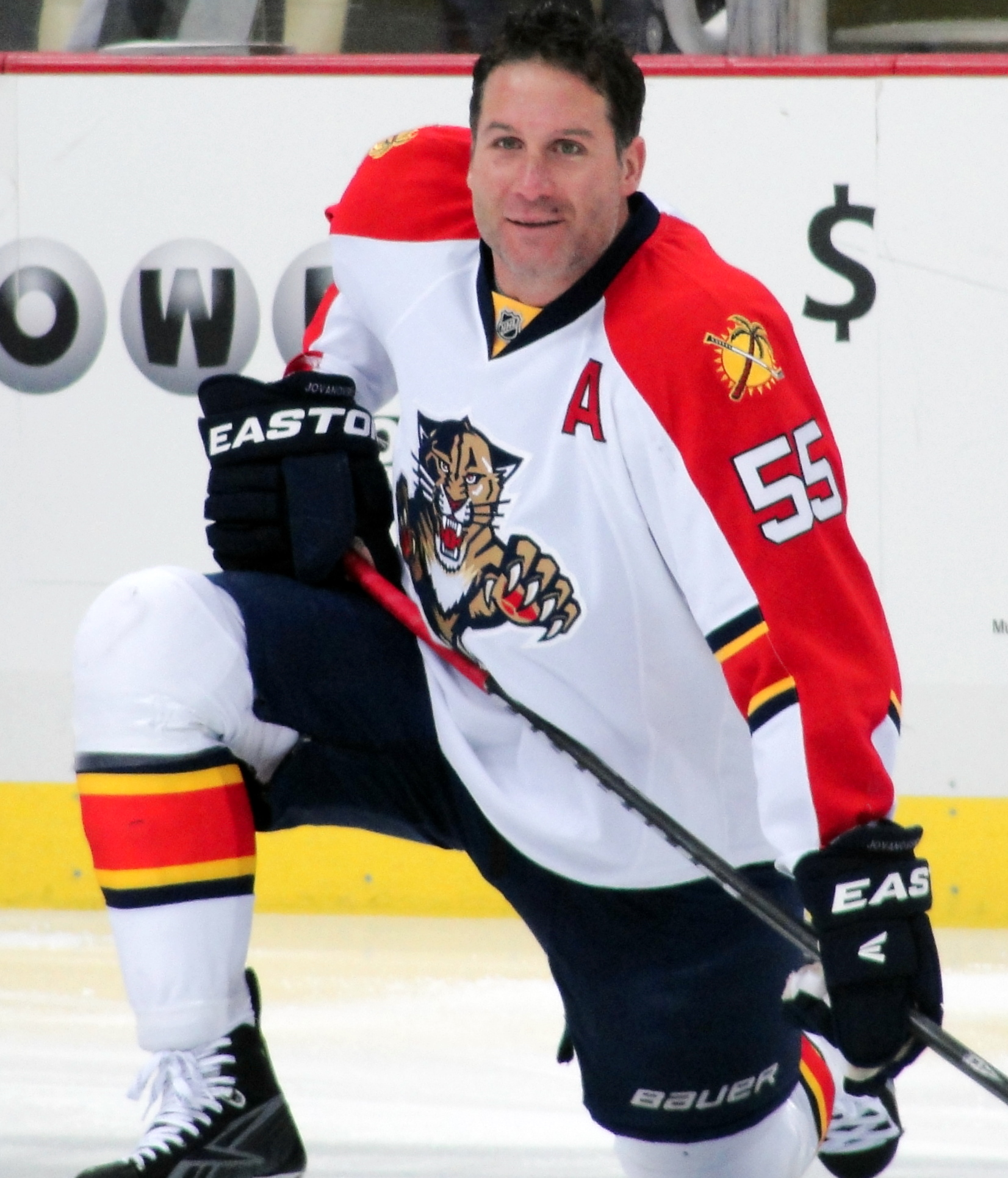
Ed Jovanovski was selected by the Panthers as the first overall pick of the 1994 NHL entry draft.

This is a complete list of ice hockey players who were drafted in the National Hockey League Entry Draft by the Florida Panthers franchise. It includes every player who was drafted, regardless of whether they played for the team.

== Key ==
Played at least one game with the Panthers
Spent entire NHL career with the Panthers

General terms and abbreviations
| Term or abbreviation | Definition |
|---|---|
| Draft | The year that the player was selected |
| Round | The round of the draft in which the player was selected |
| Pick | The overall position in the draft at which the player was selected |
| S | Supplemental draft selection |

Position abbreviations
| Abbreviation | Definition |
|---|---|
| G | Goaltender |
| D | Defense |
| LW | Left wing |
| C | Center |
| RW | Right wing |
| F | Forward |

Abbreviations for statistical columns
| Abbreviation | Definition |
|---|---|
| Pos | Position |
| GP | Games played |
| G | Goals |
| A | Assists |
| Pts | Points |
| PIM | Penalties in minutes |
| W | Wins |
| L | Losses |
| T | Ties |
| OT | Overtime/shootout losses |
| GAA | Goals against average |
| — | Does not apply |

== Draft picks ==
Statistics are complete as of the 2025–26 NHL season and show each player's career regular season totals in the NHL. Wins, losses, ties, overtime losses and goals against average apply to goaltenders and are used only for players at that position.

| Draft | Round | Pick | Player | Nationality | Pos | GP | G | A | Pts | PIM | W | L | T | OT | GAA |
|---|---|---|---|---|---|---|---|---|---|---|---|---|---|---|---|
| 1993 | 1 | 5 | Rob Niedermayer | Canada | C | 1153 | 186 | 283 | 469 | 904 | — | — | — | — | — |
| 1993 | 2 | 41 | Kevin Weekes | Canada | G | 348 | 0 | 3 | 3 | 18 | 105 | 163 | 33 | 6 | 2.88 |
| 1993 | 3 | 57 | Chris Armstrong | Canada | D | 7 | 0 | 1 | 1 | 0 | — | — | — | — | — |
| 1993 | 3 | 67 | Mikael Tjallden | Sweden | D | — | — | — | — | — | — | — | — | — | — |
| 1993 | 3 | 78 | Steve Washburn | Canada | C | 93 | 14 | 15 | 29 | 42 | — | — | — | — | — |
| 1993 | 4 | 83 | Bill McCauley | United States | D | — | — | — | — | — | — | — | — | — | — |
| 1993 | 5 | 109 | Todd MacDonald | Canada | G | — | — | — | — | — | — | — | — | — | — |
| 1993 | 6 | 135 | Alain Nasreddine | Canada | D | 74 | 1 | 4 | 5 | 84 | — | — | — | — | — |
| 1993 | 7 | 161 | Trevor Doyle | Canada | D | — | — | — | — | — | — | — | — | — | — |
| 1993 | 8 | 187 | Briane Thompson | Canada | D | — | — | — | — | — | — | — | — | — | — |
| 1993 | 9 | 213 | Chad Cabana | Canada | LW | — | — | — | — | — | — | — | — | — | — |
| 1993 | 10 | 239 | John DeMarco | United States | D | — | — | — | — | — | — | — | — | — | — |
| 1993 | 11 | 265 | Eric Montreuil | Canada | C | — | — | — | — | — | — | — | — | — | — |
| 1993 | S | 4 | Chris Imes | United States | D | — | — | — | — | — | — | — | — | — | — |
| 1994 | 1 | 1 | Ed Jovanovski | Canada | D | 1128 | 137 | 363 | 500 | 1491 | — | — | — | — | — |
| 1994 | 2 | 27 | Rhett Warrener | Canada | D | 714 | 24 | 82 | 106 | 899 | — | — | — | — | — |
| 1994 | 2 | 31 | Jason Podollan | Canada | RW | 41 | 1 | 5 | 6 | 19 | — | — | — | — | — |
| 1994 | 2 | 36 | Ryan Johnson | Canada | C | 701 | 38 | 84 | 122 | 250 | — | — | — | — | — |
| 1994 | 4 | 84 | David Nemirovsky | Canada | RW | 91 | 16 | 22 | 38 | 42 | — | — | — | — | — |
| 1994 | 5 | 105 | David Geris | Canada | D | — | — | — | — | — | — | — | — | — | — |
| 1994 | 7 | 157 | Matt O'Dette | Canada | D | — | — | — | — | — | — | — | — | — | — |
| 1994 | 8 | 183 | Jason Boudrias | Canada | F | — | — | — | — | — | — | — | — | — | — |
| 1994 | 10 | 235 | Tero Lehtera | Finland | C | — | — | — | — | — | — | — | — | — | — |
| 1994 | 11 | 261 | Per Gustafsson | Sweden | D | 89 | 8 | 27 | 35 | 38 | — | — | — | — | — |
| 1994 | S | 1 | Sean McCann | Canada | D | — | — | — | — | — | — | — | — | — | — |
| 1995 | 1 | 10 | Radek Dvorak | Czech Republic | RW | 1260 | 227 | 363 | 590 | 449 | — | — | — | — | — |
| 1995 | 2 | 36 | Aaron MacDonald | Canada | G | — | — | — | — | — | — | — | — | — | — |
| 1995 | 3 | 62 | Mike O'Grady | Canada | D | — | — | — | — | — | — | — | — | — | — |
| 1995 | 4 | 80 | Dave Duerden | Canada | LW | 2 | 0 | 0 | 0 | 0 | — | — | — | — | — |
| 1995 | 4 | 88 | Daniel Tjarnqvist | Sweden | D | 352 | 18 | 72 | 90 | 130 | — | — | — | — | — |
| 1995 | 5 | 114 | Francois Cloutier | Canada | LW | — | — | — | — | — | — | — | — | — | — |
| 1995 | 7 | 166 | Peter Worrell | Canada | LW | 391 | 19 | 27 | 46 | 1554 | — | — | — | — | — |
| 1995 | 8 | 192 | Filip Kuba | Czech Republic | D | 836 | 70 | 263 | 333 | 361 | — | — | — | — | — |
| 1995 | 9 | 218 | David Lemanowicz | Canada | G | — | — | — | — | — | — | — | — | — | — |
| 1996 | 1 | 20 | Marcus Nilson | Sweden | RW | 521 | 67 | 101 | 168 | 270 | — | — | — | — | — |
| 1996 | 3 | 60 | Chris Allen | Canada | D | 2 | 0 | 0 | 0 | 2 | — | — | — | — | — |
| 1996 | 3 | 65 | Oleg Kvasha | Russia | LW | 493 | 81 | 136 | 217 | 335 | — | — | — | — | — |
| 1996 | 4 | 82 | Joey Tetarenko | Canada | RW | 73 | 4 | 1 | 5 | 176 | — | — | — | — | — |
| 1996 | 5 | 129 | Andrew Long | Canada | C | — | — | — | — | — | — | — | — | — | — |
| 1996 | 6 | 156 | Gaetan Poirier | Canada | LW | — | — | — | — | — | — | — | — | — | — |
| 1996 | 7 | 183 | Alexandre Couture | Canada | D | — | — | — | — | — | — | — | — | — | — |
| 1996 | 8 | 209 | Denis Khlopotnov | Russia | G | — | — | — | — | — | — | — | — | — | — |
| 1996 | 9 | 235 | Russell Smith | Canada | D | — | — | — | — | — | — | — | — | — | — |
| 1997 | 1 | 20 | Mike Brown | Canada | W | 34 | 1 | 2 | 3 | 130 | — | — | — | — | — |
| 1997 | 2 | 47 | Kristian Huselius | Sweden | LW | 662 | 190 | 261 | 451 | 256 | — | — | — | — | — |
| 1997 | 3 | 56 | Vratislav Cech | Czech Republic | D | — | — | — | — | — | — | — | — | — | — |
| 1997 | 3 | 74 | Nick Smith | Canada | C | 15 | 0 | 0 | 0 | 0 | — | — | — | — | — |
| 1997 | 4 | 95 | Ivan Novoseltsev | Russia | RW | 234 | 31 | 44 | 75 | 112 | — | — | — | — | — |
| 1997 | 5 | 127 | Pat Parthenais | United States | D | — | — | — | — | — | — | — | — | — | — |
| 1997 | 6 | 155 | Keith Delaney | Canada | C | — | — | — | — | — | — | — | — | — | — |
| 1997 | 7 | 183 | Tyler Palmer | Canada | D | — | — | — | — | — | — | — | — | — | — |
| 1997 | 8 | 211 | Doug Schueller | United States | F | — | — | — | — | — | — | — | — | — | — |
| 1997 | 9 | 237 | Benoit Cote | Canada | F | — | — | — | — | — | — | — | — | — | — |
| 1998 | 2 | 30 | Kyle Rossiter | Canada | D | 11 | 0 | 1 | 1 | 9 | — | — | — | — | — |
| 1998 | 3 | 61 | Joe DiPenta | Canada | D | 174 | 6 | 17 | 23 | 110 | — | — | — | — | — |
| 1998 | 3 | 63 | Lance Ward | Canada | D | 209 | 4 | 12 | 16 | 391 | — | — | — | — | — |
| 1998 | 4 | 89 | Ryan Jardine | Canada | W | 8 | 0 | 2 | 2 | 2 | — | — | — | — | — |
| 1998 | 5 | 117 | Jaroslav Spacek | Czech Republic | D | 880 | 82 | 273 | 355 | 618 | — | — | — | — | — |
| 1998 | 6 | 148 | Chris Ovington | Canada | D | — | — | — | — | — | — | — | — | — | — |
| 1998 | 7 | 167 | B. J. Ketcheson | Canada | D | — | — | — | — | — | — | — | — | — | — |
| 1998 | 8 | 203 | Ian Jacobs | Canada | D | — | — | — | — | — | — | — | — | — | — |
| 1998 | 9 | 231 | Adrian Wichser | Switzerland | F | — | — | — | — | — | — | — | — | — | — |
| 1999 | 1 | 12 | Denis Shvidki | Russia | RW | 76 | 11 | 14 | 25 | 30 | — | — | — | — | — |
| 1999 | 2 | 40 | Alex Auld | Canada | G | 237 | 0 | 7 | 7 | 12 | 91 | 88 | 2 | 30 | 2.80 |
| 1999 | 3 | 70 | Niklas Hagman | Finland | LW | 770 | 147 | 154 | 301 | 220 | — | — | — | — | — |
| 1999 | 3 | 80 | Jean-Francois Laniel | Canada | G | — | — | — | — | — | — | — | — | — | — |
| 1999 | 4 | 103 | Morgan McCormick | Canada | RW | — | — | — | — | — | — | — | — | — | — |
| 1999 | 4 | 109 | Rod Sarich | United Kingdom | D | — | — | — | — | — | — | — | — | — | — |
| 1999 | 6 | 169 | Brad Woods | Canada | D | — | — | — | — | — | — | — | — | — | — |
| 1999 | 7 | 198 | Travis Eagles | Canada | C | — | — | — | — | — | — | — | — | — | — |
| 1999 | 8 | 227 | Jonathan Charron | Canada | G | — | — | — | — | — | — | — | — | — | — |
| 2000 | 2 | 58 | Vladimir Sapozhnikov | Russia | D | — | — | — | — | — | — | — | — | — | — |
| 2000 | 3 | 77 | Robert Fried | United States | F | — | — | — | — | — | — | — | — | — | — |
| 2000 | 3 | 82 | Sean O'Connor | Canada | RW | — | — | — | — | — | — | — | — | — | — |
| 2000 | 4 | 115 | Chris Eade | Canada | D | — | — | — | — | — | — | — | — | — | — |
| 2000 | 4 | 120 | Davis Parley | Canada | G | — | — | — | — | — | — | — | — | — | — |
| 2000 | 6 | 190 | Josh Olson | United States | LW | 5 | 1 | 0 | 1 | 0 | — | — | — | — | — |
| 2000 | 8 | 234 | Janis Sprukts | Latvia | C | 14 | 1 | 2 | 3 | 2 | — | — | — | — | — |
| 2000 | 8 | 253 | Matt Sommerfeld | Canada | LW | — | — | — | — | — | — | — | — | — | — |
| 2001 | 1 | 4 | Stephen Weiss | Canada | C | 732 | 156 | 267 | 423 | 341 | — | — | — | — | — |
| 2001 | 1 | 24 | Lukas Krajicek | Czech Republic | D | 328 | 11 | 61 | 72 | 245 | — | — | — | — | — |
| 2001 | 2 | 34 | Greg Watson | Canada | C | — | — | — | — | — | — | — | — | — | — |
| 2001 | 3 | 64 | Tomas Malec | Slovakia | D | 46 | 0 | 2 | 2 | 47 | — | — | — | — | — |
| 2001 | 3 | 68 | Grant McNeill | Canada | D | 3 | 0 | 0 | 0 | 5 | — | — | — | — | — |
| 2001 | 4 | 117 | Michael Woodford | United States | F | — | — | — | — | — | — | — | — | — | — |
| 2001 | 5 | 136 | Billy Thompson | Canada | G | — | — | — | — | — | — | — | — | — | — |
| 2001 | 6 | 169 | Dustin Johner | Canada | C | — | — | — | — | — | — | — | — | — | — |
| 2001 | 7 | 200 | Toni Koivisto | Finland | LW | — | — | — | — | — | — | — | — | — | — |
| 2001 | 8 | 231 | Kyle Bruce | Canada | RW | — | — | — | — | — | — | — | — | — | — |
| 2001 | 9 | 263 | Jan Blanar | Slovakia | D | — | — | — | — | — | — | — | — | — | — |
| 2001 | 9 | 267 | Ivan Majesky | Slovakia | D | 202 | 8 | 23 | 31 | 234 | — | — | — | — | — |
| 2002 | 1 | 3 | Jay Bouwmeester | Canada | D | 1240 | 88 | 336 | 424 | 635 | — | — | — | — | — |
| 2002 | 1 | 9 | Petr Taticek | Czech Republic | C | 3 | 0 | 0 | 0 | 0 | — | — | — | — | — |
| 2002 | 2 | 40 | Rob Globke | United States | RW | 46 | 1 | 1 | 2 | 8 | — | — | — | — | — |
| 2002 | 3 | 67 | Gregory Campbell | Canada | C | 803 | 71 | 116 | 187 | 696 | — | — | — | — | — |
| 2002 | 5 | 134 | Topi Jaakola | Finland | D | — | — | — | — | — | — | — | — | — | — |
| 2002 | 5 | 158 | Vince Bellissimo | Canada | C | — | — | — | — | — | — | — | — | — | — |
| 2002 | 6 | 169 | Jeremy Swanson | Canada | D | — | — | — | — | — | — | — | — | — | — |
| 2002 | 6 | 196 | Mikael Vuorio | Finland | G | — | — | — | — | — | — | — | — | — | — |
| 2002 | 7 | 200 | Denis Yachmenev | Russia | LW | — | — | — | — | — | — | — | — | — | — |
| 2002 | 8 | 232 | Peter Hafner | United States | D | — | — | — | — | — | — | — | — | — | — |
| 2003 | 1 | 3 | Nathan Horton | Canada | C | 627 | 203 | 218 | 421 | 567 | — | — | — | — | — |
| 2003 | 1 | 25 | Anthony Stewart | Canada | RW | 262 | 27 | 44 | 71 | 123 | — | — | — | — | — |
| 2003 | 2 | 38 | Kamil Kreps | Czech Republic | C | 232 | 18 | 42 | 60 | 71 | — | — | — | — | — |
| 2003 | 2 | 55 | Stefan Meyer | Canada | LW | 20 | 0 | 2 | 2 | 17 | — | — | — | — | — |
| 2003 | 4 | 105 | Martin Lojek | Czech Republic | D | 5 | 0 | 1 | 1 | 0 | — | — | — | — | — |
| 2003 | 4 | 124 | Jay Pemberton | United States | D | — | — | — | — | — | — | — | — | — | — |
| 2003 | 5 | 141 | Dan Travis | United States | F | — | — | — | — | — | — | — | — | — | — |
| 2003 | 5 | 162 | Martin Tuma | Czech Republic | D | — | — | — | — | — | — | — | — | — | — |
| 2003 | 6 | 171 | Denis Stasyuk | Russia | C | — | — | — | — | — | — | — | — | — | — |
| 2003 | 7 | 223 | Dany Roussin | Canada | LW | — | — | — | — | — | — | — | — | — | — |
| 2003 | 8 | 234 | Petr Kadlec | Czech Republic | RW | — | — | — | — | — | — | — | — | — | — |
| 2003 | 9 | 264 | John Hecimovic | Canada | RW | — | — | — | — | — | — | — | — | — | — |
| 2003 | 9 | 265 | Tanner Glass | Canada | LW | 527 | 24 | 45 | 69 | 658 | — | — | — | — | — |
| 2004 | 1 | 7 | Rostislav Olesz | Czech Republic | LW | 365 | 57 | 77 | 134 | 118 | — | — | — | — | — |
| 2004 | 2 | 37 | David Shantz | Canada | G | — | — | — | — | — | — | — | — | — | — |
| 2004 | 2 | 53 | David Booth | United States | LW | 530 | 124 | 112 | 236 | 216 | — | — | — | — | — |
| 2004 | 4 | 105 | Evan Schafer | Canada | D | — | — | — | — | — | — | — | — | — | — |
| 2004 | 5 | 152 | Bret Nasby | Canada | D | — | — | — | — | — | — | — | — | — | — |
| 2004 | 9 | 267 | Spencer Dillon | United States | D | — | — | — | — | — | — | — | — | — | — |
| 2004 | 9 | 283 | Luke Beaverson | United States | D | — | — | — | — | — | — | — | — | — | — |
| 2005 | 1 | 20 | Kenndal McArdle | Canada | LW | 42 | 1 | 2 | 3 | 51 | — | — | — | — | — |
| 2005 | 2 | 32 | Tyler Plante | Canada | G | — | — | — | — | — | — | — | — | — | — |
| 2005 | 3 | 90 | Dan Collins | United States | RW | — | — | — | — | — | — | — | — | — | — |
| 2005 | 4 | 93 | Olivier Legault | Canada | LW | — | — | — | — | — | — | — | — | — | — |
| 2005 | 4 | 104 | Matt Duffy | United States | D | — | — | — | — | — | — | — | — | — | — |
| 2005 | 5 | 161 | Brian Foster | United States | G | 1 | 0 | 0 | 0 | 0 | 0 | 0 | — | 0 | 0.00 |
| 2005 | 6 | 164 | Roman Derlyuk | Russia | D | — | — | — | — | — | — | — | — | — | — |
| 2005 | 7 | 224 | Zach Bearson | United States | RW | — | — | — | — | — | — | — | — | — | — |
| 2006 | 1 | 10 | Michael Frolik | Czech Republic | LW | 858 | 159 | 225 | 384 | 317 | — | — | — | — | — |
| 2006 | 3 | 73 | Brady Calla | Canada | RW | — | — | — | — | — | — | — | — | — | — |
| 2006 | 4 | 103 | Michael Caruso | Canada | D | 2 | 0 | 0 | 0 | 0 | — | — | — | — | — |
| 2006 | 4 | 116 | Derrick LaPoint | United States | D | — | — | — | — | — | — | — | — | — | — |
| 2006 | 6 | 155 | Peter Aston | Canada | D | — | — | — | — | — | — | — | — | — | — |
| 2006 | 7 | 193 | Marc Cheverie | Canada | G | — | — | — | — | — | — | — | — | — | — |
| 2007 | 1 | 10 | Keaton Ellerby | Canada | D | 212 | 4 | 23 | 27 | 88 | — | — | — | — | — |
| 2007 | 2 | 40 | Michal Repik | Czech Republic | RW | 72 | 9 | 11 | 20 | 36 | — | — | — | — | — |
| 2007 | 3 | 71 | Evgeny Dadonov | Russia | RW | 641 | 164 | 198 | 362 | 102 | — | — | — | — | — |
| 2007 | 4 | 101 | Matt Rust | United States | C | — | — | — | — | — | — | — | — | — | — |
| 2007 | 5 | 131 | John Lee | United States | D | — | — | — | — | — | — | — | — | — | — |
| 2007 | 6 | 181 | Corey Syvret | Canada | D | — | — | — | — | — | — | — | — | — | — |
| 2007 | 7 | 191 | Ryan Watson | Canada | LW | — | — | — | — | — | — | — | — | — | — |
| 2007 | 7 | 202 | Sergei Gaiduchenko | Ukraine | G | — | — | — | — | — | — | — | — | — | — |
| 2008 | 2 | 31 | Jacob Markstrom | Sweden | G | 578 | 0 | 23 | 23 | 55 | 264 | 231 | — | 64 | 2.73 |
| 2008 | 2 | 46 | Colby Robak | Canada | D | 47 | 0 | 4 | 4 | 25 | — | — | — | — | — |
| 2008 | 3 | 80 | Adam Comrie | United States | D | — | — | — | — | — | — | — | — | — | — |
| 2008 | 4 | 100 | AJ Jenks | United States | LW | — | — | — | — | — | — | — | — | — | — |
| 2008 | 7 | 190 | Matt Bartkowski | United States | D | 256 | 8 | 40 | 48 | 157 | — | — | — | — | — |
| 2009 | 1 | 14 | Dmitri Kulikov | Russia | D | 1037 | 50 | 197 | 247 | 639 | — | — | — | — | — |
| 2009 | 2 | 44 | Drew Shore | United States | C | 98 | 9 | 17 | 26 | 30 | — | — | — | — | — |
| 2009 | 3 | 67 | Josh Birkholz | United States | RW | — | — | — | — | — | — | — | — | — | — |
| 2009 | 4 | 107 | Garrett Wilson | Canada | LW | 84 | 2 | 6 | 8 | 42 | — | — | — | — | — |
| 2009 | 5 | 135 | Corban Knight | Canada | C | 52 | 4 | 8 | 12 | 4 | — | — | — | — | — |
| 2009 | 5 | 138 | Wade Megan | United States | C | 15 | 1 | 1 | 2 | 2 | — | — | — | — | — |
| 2009 | 6 | 165 | Scott Timmins | Canada | C | 24 | 1 | 0 | 1 | 12 | — | — | — | — | — |
| 2010 | 1 | 3 | Erik Gudbranson | Canada | D | 842 | 35 | 105 | 140 | 864 | — | — | — | — | — |
| 2010 | 1 | 19 | Nick Bjugstad | United States | C | 821 | 163 | 176 | 339 | 377 | — | — | — | — | — |
| 2010 | 1 | 25 | Quinton Howden | Canada | LW | 97 | 10 | 7 | 17 | 30 | — | — | — | — | — |
| 2010 | 2 | 33 | John McFarland | Canada | C | 3 | 0 | 0 | 0 | 0 | — | — | — | — | — |
| 2010 | 2 | 36 | Alex Petrovic | Canada | D | 323 | 7 | 53 | 60 | 411 | — | — | — | — | — |
| 2010 | 2 | 50 | Connor Brickley | United States | F | 81 | 6 | 15 | 21 | 42 | — | — | — | — | — |
| 2010 | 3 | 69 | Joe Basaraba | Canada | RW | — | — | — | — | — | — | — | — | — | — |
| 2010 | 4 | 92 | Sam Brittain | Canada | G | — | — | — | — | — | — | — | — | — | — |
| 2010 | 4 | 93 | Benjamin Gallacher | Canada | D | — | — | — | — | — | — | — | — | — | — |
| 2010 | 4 | 99 | Joonas Donskoi | Finland | F | 474 | 80 | 128 | 208 | 116 | — | — | — | — | — |
| 2010 | 5 | 123 | Zach Hyman | Canada | C | 711 | 261 | 234 | 495 | 384 | — | — | — | — | — |
| 2010 | 6 | 153 | Corey Durocher | Canada | LW | — | — | — | — | — | — | — | — | — | — |
| 2010 | 7 | 183 | R. J. Boyd | United States | D | — | — | — | — | — | — | — | — | — | — |
| 2011 | 1 | 3 | Jonathan Huberdeau | Canada | C | 962 | 263 | 544 | 807 | 501 | — | — | — | — | — |
| 2011 | 2 | 33 | Rocco Grimaldi | United States | C | 203 | 30 | 37 | 67 | 34 | — | — | — | — | — |
| 2011 | 2 | 59 | Rasmus Bengtsson | Sweden | D | — | — | — | — | — | — | — | — | — | — |
| 2011 | 3 | 64 | Vincent Trocheck | United States | C | 868 | 239 | 392 | 631 | 593 | — | — | — | — | — |
| 2011 | 3 | 76 | Logan Shaw | Canada | RW | 232 | 16 | 23 | 39 | 37 | — | — | — | — | — |
| 2011 | 3 | 87 | Jonathan Racine | Canada | D | 1 | 0 | 0 | 0 | 2 | — | — | — | — | — |
| 2011 | 3 | 91 | Kyle Rau | United States | C | 61 | 2 | 5 | 7 | 15 | — | — | — | — | — |
| 2011 | 5 | 124 | Yaroslav Kosov | Russia | F | — | — | — | — | — | — | — | — | — | — |
| 2011 | 6 | 154 | Edward Wittchow | United States | D | — | — | — | — | — | — | — | — | — | — |
| 2011 | 7 | 184 | Iiro Pakarinen | Finland | RW | 134 | 10 | 13 | 23 | 18 | — | — | — | — | — |
| 2012 | 1 | 23 | Mike Matheson | Canada | D | 705 | 81 | 221 | 302 | 394 | — | — | — | — | — |
| 2012 | 3 | 84 | Steven Hodges | Canada | C | — | — | — | — | — | — | — | — | — | — |
| 2012 | 4 | 114 | Alexander Delnov | Russia | LW | — | — | — | — | — | — | — | — | — | — |
| 2012 | 6 | 174 | Francis Beauvillier | Canada | F | — | — | — | — | — | — | — | — | — | — |
| 2012 | 7 | 194 | Jonatan Nielsen | Sweden | D | — | — | — | — | — | — | — | — | — | — |
| 2013 | 1 | 2 | Aleksander Barkov | Finland | C | 804 | 286 | 496 | 782 | 164 | — | — | — | — | — |
| 2013 | 2 | 31 | Ian McCoshen | United States | D | 60 | 4 | 3 | 7 | 33 | — | — | — | — | — |
| 2013 | 4 | 92 | Evan Cowley | United States | G | — | — | — | — | — | — | — | — | — | — |
| 2013 | 4 | 97 | Michael Downing | United States | D | — | — | — | — | — | — | — | — | — | — |
| 2013 | 4 | 98 | Matt Buckles | Canada | C | — | — | — | — | — | — | — | — | — | — |
| 2013 | 5 | 122 | Christopher Clapperton | Canada | LW | — | — | — | — | — | — | — | — | — | — |
| 2013 | 6 | 152 | Josh Brown | Canada | D | 300 | 11 | 24 | 35 | 307 | — | — | — | — | — |
| 2013 | 7 | 206 | MacKenzie Weegar | Canada | D | 629 | 63 | 216 | 279 | 474 | — | — | — | — | — |
| 2014 | 1 | 1 | Aaron Ekblad | Canada | D | 804 | 122 | 284 | 406 | 560 | — | — | — | — | — |
| 2014 | 2 | 32 | Jayce Hawryluk | Canada | RW | 98 | 12 | 15 | 27 | 41 | — | — | — | — | — |
| 2014 | 3 | 65 | Juho Lammikko | Finland | RW | 183 | 11 | 17 | 28 | 34 | — | — | — | — | — |
| 2014 | 4 | 92 | Joe Wegwerth | United States | RW | — | — | — | — | — | — | — | — | — | — |
| 2014 | 5 | 143 | Miguel Fidler | United States | LW | — | — | — | — | — | — | — | — | — | — |
| 2014 | 7 | 206 | Hugo Fagerblom | Sweden | G | — | — | — | — | — | — | — | — | — | — |
| 2015 | 1 | 11 | Lawson Crouse | Canada | LW | 666 | 139 | 120 | 259 | 409 | — | — | — | — | — |
| 2015 | 3 | 77 | Samuel Montembeault | Canada | G | 231 | 0 | 4 | 4 | 0 | 90 | 92 | — | 32 | 3.23 |
| 2015 | 3 | 88 | Thomas Schemitsch | Canada | D | — | — | — | — | — | — | — | — | — | — |
| 2015 | 4 | 102 | Denis Malgin | Switzerland | C | 257 | 41 | 40 | 81 | 50 | — | — | — | — | — |
| 2015 | 5 | 132 | Karch Bachman | United States | LW | — | — | — | — | — | — | — | — | — | — |
| 2015 | 6 | 162 | Chris Wilkie | United States | RW | — | — | — | — | — | — | — | — | — | — |
| 2015 | 7 | 192 | Patrick Shea | United States | C | — | — | — | — | — | — | — | — | — | — |
| 2015 | 7 | 206 | Ryan Bednard | United States | G | — | — | — | — | — | — | — | — | — | — |
| 2016 | 1 | 23 | Henrik Borgstrom | Finland | C | 111 | 13 | 13 | 26 | 28 | — | — | — | — | — |
| 2016 | 2 | 38 | Adam Mascherin | Canada | LW | — | — | — | — | — | — | — | — | — | — |
| 2016 | 3 | 89 | Linus Nassen | Sweden | D | — | — | — | — | — | — | — | — | — | — |
| 2016 | 4 | 94 | Jonathan Ang | Canada | C | — | — | — | — | — | — | — | — | — | — |
| 2016 | 4 | 114 | Riley Stillman | Canada | D | 167 | 4 | 22 | 26 | 111 | — | — | — | — | — |
| 2016 | 6 | 175 | Maxim Mamin | Russia | C | 73 | 10 | 8 | 18 | 25 | — | — | — | — | — |
| 2016 | 7 | 195 | Benjamin Finkelstein | United States | D | — | — | — | — | — | — | — | — | — | — |
| 2017 | 1 | 10 | Owen Tippett | Canada | RW | 428 | 121 | 115 | 236 | 94 | — | — | — | — | — |
| 2017 | 2 | 40 | Aleksi Heponiemi | Finland | C | 25 | 2 | 4 | 6 | 6 | — | — | — | — | — |
| 2017 | 3 | 66 | Maxwell Gildon | United States | D | — | — | — | — | — | — | — | — | — | — |
| 2017 | 5 | 133 | Tyler Inamoto | United States | D | — | — | — | — | — | — | — | — | — | — |
| 2017 | 6 | 184 | Sebastian Repo | Finland | RW | — | — | — | — | — | — | — | — | — | — |
| 2018 | 1 | 15 | Grigori Denisenko | Russia | LW | 33 | 0 | 7 | 7 | 12 | — | — | — | — | — |
| 2018 | 2 | 34 | Serron Noel | Canada | RW | — | — | — | — | — | — | — | — | — | — |
| 2018 | 3 | 89 | Logan Hutsko | United States | RW | — | — | — | — | — | — | — | — | — | — |
| 2018 | 6 | 170 | Justin Schutz | Germany | LW | — | — | — | — | — | — | — | — | — | — |
| 2018 | 7 | 201 | Cole Krygier | United States | D | — | — | — | — | — | — | — | — | — | — |
| 2018 | 7 | 207 | Santtu Kinnunen | Finland | D | — | — | — | — | — | — | — | — | — | — |
| 2019 | 1 | 13 | Spencer Knight | United States | G | 150 | 0 | 4 | 4 | 0 | 68 | 58 | — | 20 | 2.83 |
| 2019 | 2 | 52 | Vladislav Kolyachonok | Belarus | D | 87 | 5 | 12 | 17 | 22 | — | — | — | — | — |
| 2019 | 3 | 69 | John Ludvig | Canada | D | 41 | 3 | 4 | 7 | 53 | — | — | — | — | — |
| 2019 | 3 | 81 | Cole Schwindt | Canada | RW | 78 | 6 | 9 | 15 | 4 | — | — | — | — | — |
| 2019 | 4 | 106 | Carter Berger | Canada | D | — | — | — | — | — | — | — | — | — | — |
| 2019 | 5 | 136 | Henrik Rybinski | Canada | RW | — | — | — | — | — | — | — | — | — | — |
| 2019 | 5 | 137 | Owen Lindmark | United States | C | — | — | — | — | — | — | — | — | — | — |
| 2019 | 6 | 168 | Greg Meireles | Canada | C | — | — | — | — | — | — | — | — | — | — |
| 2019 | 7 | 199 | Matthew Wedman | Canada | C | — | — | — | — | — | — | — | — | — | — |
| 2020 | 1 | 12 | Anton Lundell | Finland | C | 359 | 78 | 123 | 201 | 177 | — | — | — | — | — |
| 2020 | 2 | 43 | Emil Heineman | Sweden | LW | 148 | 32 | 17 | 49 | 38 | — | — | — | — | — |
| 2020 | 3 | 74 | Ty Smilanic | United States | C | — | — | — | — | — | — | — | — | — | — |
| 2020 | 3 | 87 | Justin Sourdif | Canada | C | 82 | 16 | 20 | 36 | 35 | — | — | — | — | — |
| 2020 | 4 | 95 | Michael Benning | Canada | D | 18 | 2 | 4 | 6 | 2 | — | — | — | — | — |
| 2020 | 4 | 105 | Zach Uens | Canada | D | — | — | — | — | — | — | — | — | — | — |
| 2020 | 5 | 153 | Kasper Puutio | Finland | C | — | — | — | — | — | — | — | — | — | — |
| 2020 | 7 | 198 | Elliot Ekmark | Sweden | C | — | — | — | — | — | — | — | — | — | — |
| 2020 | 7 | 212 | Devon Levi | Canada | G | 39 | 0 | 0 | 0 | 0 | 17 | 17 | — | 2 | 3.29 |
| 2021 | 1 | 24 | Mackie Samoskevich | United States | C | 156 | 27 | 36 | 63 | 42 | — | — | — | — | — |
| 2021 | 2 | 56 | Evan Nause | Canada | D | — | — | — | — | — | — | — | — | — | — |
| 2021 | 4 | 120 | Vladislav Lukashevich | Russia | D | — | — | — | — | — | — | — | — | — | — |
| 2021 | 5 | 152 | Kirill Gerasimyuk | Russia | G | — | — | — | — | — | — | — | — | — | — |
| 2021 | 6 | 184 | Jakub Kos | Czech Republic | LW | — | — | — | — | — | — | — | — | — | — |
| 2021 | 7 | 210 | Braden Hache | Canada | D | — | — | — | — | — | — | — | — | — | — |
| 2022 | 3 | 93 | Marek Alscher | Czech Republic | D | 4 | 0 | 3 | 3 | 0 | — | — | — | — | — |
| 2022 | 4 | 125 | Ludvig Jansson | Sweden | D | 4 | 0 | 1 | 1 | 0 | — | — | — | — | — |
| 2022 | 5 | 157 | Sandis Vilmanis | Latvia | LW | 19 | 3 | 2 | 5 | 4 | — | — | — | — | — |
| 2022 | 6 | 186 | Josh Davies | Canada | LW | — | — | — | — | — | — | — | — | — | — |
| 2022 | 6 | 189 | Tyler Muszelik | United States | G | — | — | — | — | — | — | — | — | — | — |
| 2022 | 7 | 214 | Liam Arnsby | Canada | C | — | — | — | — | — | — | — | — | — | — |
| 2022 | 7 | 221 | Jack Devine | United States | RW | 6 | 0 | 0 | 0 | 2 | — | — | — | — | — |
| 2023 | 2 | 63 | Gracyn Sawchyn | Canada | C | — | — | — | — | — | — | — | — | — | — |
| 2023 | 4 | 127 | Albert Wikman | Sweden | D | — | — | — | — | — | — | — | — | — | — |
| 2023 | 5 | 159 | Olof Glifford | Sweden | G | — | — | — | — | — | — | — | — | — | — |
| 2023 | 6 | 191 | Luke Coughlin | Canada | D | — | — | — | — | — | — | — | — | — | — |
| 2023 | 7 | 198 | Stepan Zvyagin | Russia | LW | — | — | — | — | — | — | — | — | — | — |
| 2024 | 2 | 58 | Linus Eriksson | Sweden | C | — | — | — | — | — | — | — | — | — | — |
| 2024 | 3 | 97 | Matvei Shuravin | Russia | D | — | — | — | — | — | — | — | — | — | — |
| 2024 | 4 | 129 | Simon Zether | Sweden | C | — | — | — | — | — | — | — | — | — | — |
| 2024 | 6 | 169 | Stepan Gorbunov | Russia | C | — | — | — | — | — | — | — | — | — | — |
| 2024 | 6 | 193 | Hunter St. Martin | Canada | LW | — | — | — | — | — | — | — | — | — | — |
| 2024 | 7 | 201 | Denis Gabdrakhmanov | Russia | G | — | — | — | — | — | — | — | — | — | — |
| 2025 | 4 | 112 | Mads Kongsbak Klyvø | Denmark | LW | — | — | — | — | — | — | — | — | — | — |
| 2025 | 4 | 128 | Shea Busch | Canada | LW | — | — | — | — | — | — | — | — | — | — |
| 2025 | 5 | 129 | Shamar Moses | Canada | RW | — | — | — | — | — | — | — | — | — | — |
| 2025 | 6 | 192 | Arvid Drott | Sweden | RW | — | — | — | — | — | — | — | — | — | — |
| 2025 | 7 | 197 | Brendan Dunphy | United States | D | — | — | — | — | — | — | — | — | — | — |
| 2025 | 7 | 224 | Yegor Midlak | Russia | G | — | — | — | — | — | — | — | — | — | — |
| 2026 | 2 | 40 | Simas Ignatavičius | Lithuania | RW | — | — | — | — | — | — | — | — | — | — |
| 2026 | 2 | 48 | Ryder Cali | Canada | C | — | — | — | — | — | — | — | — | — | — |
| 2026 | 4 | 98 | Jonas Kemps | United States | D | — | — | — | — | — | — | — | — | — | — |
| 2026 | 6 | 168 | Vilho Vanhatalo | Finland | RW | — | — | — | — | — | — | — | — | — | — |
| 2026 | 6 | 181 | Cole Zurawski | Canada | RW | — | — | — | — | — | — | — | — | — | — |
| 2026 | 7 | 217 | Louis-Antoine Denault | Canada | G | — | — | — | — | — | — | — | — | — | — |

Draft picks who have played for the team

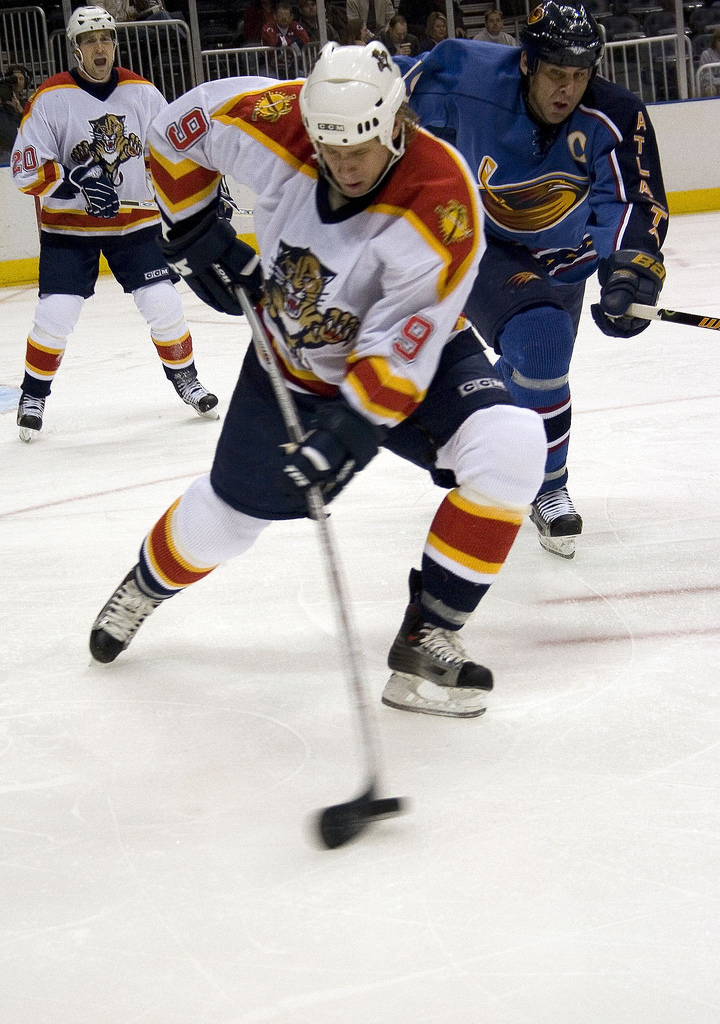
The Panthers selected Stephen Weiss fourth overall in 2001.

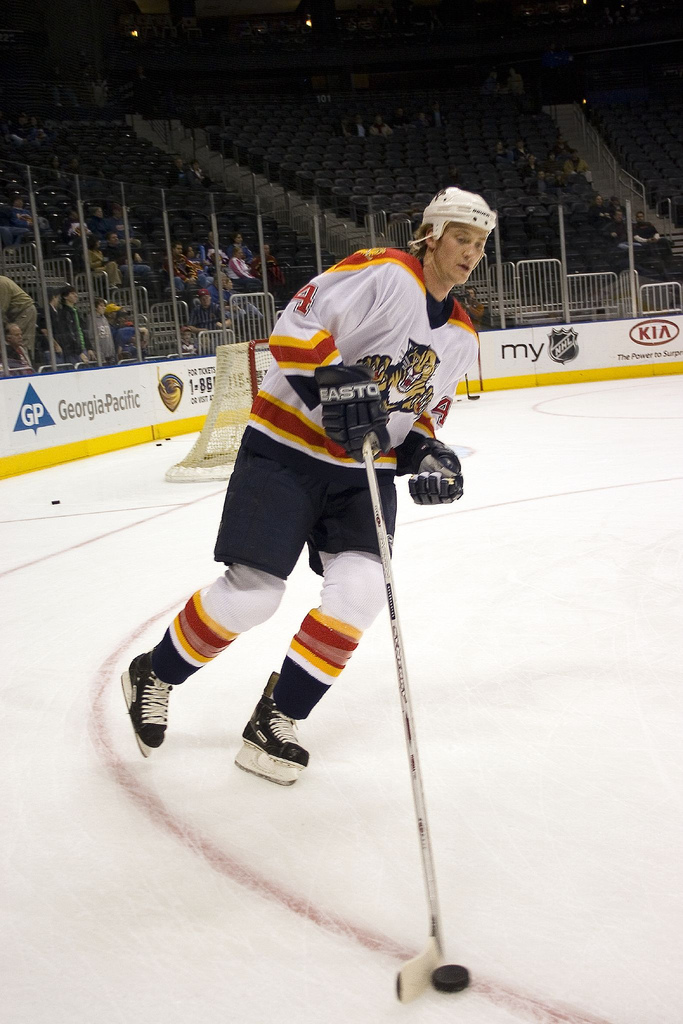
The Panthers selected Jay Bouwmeester third overall in 2002.

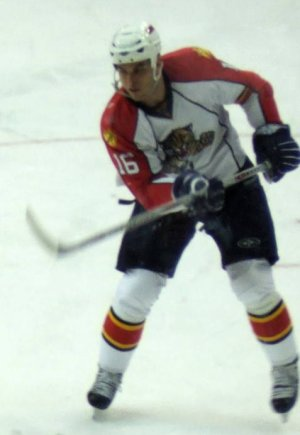
The Panthers selected Nathan Horton third overall in 2003.

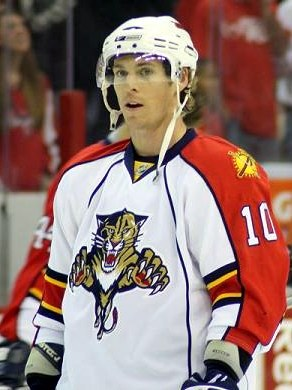
The Panthers selected David Booth 53rd overall in 2004.

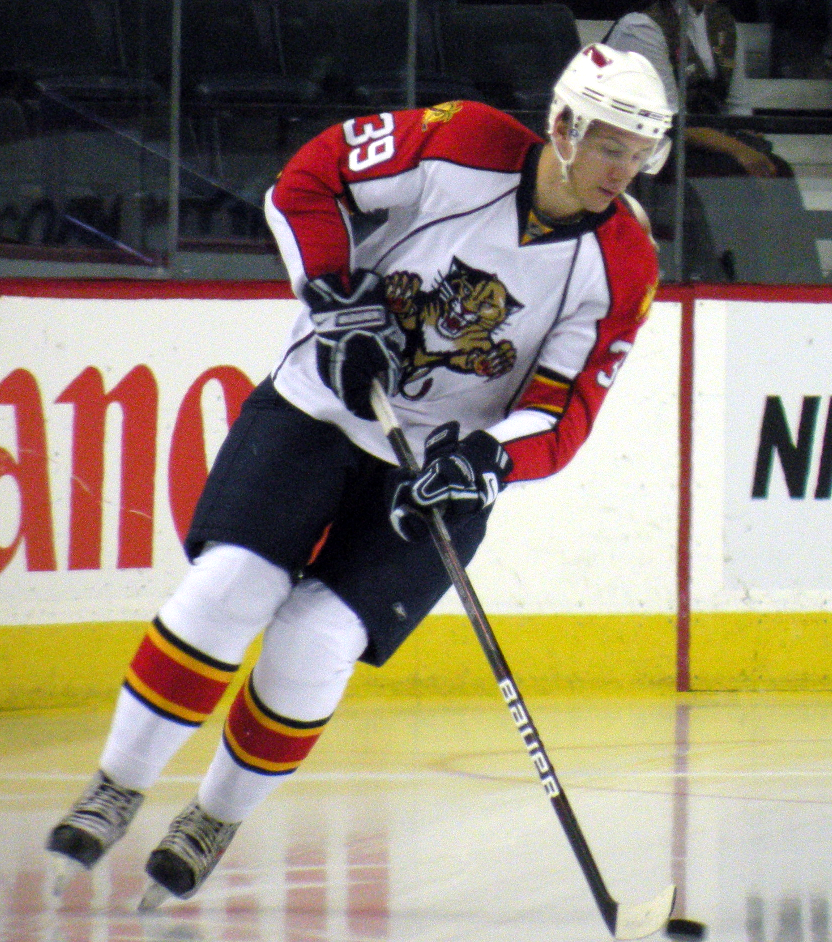
The Panthers selected Keaton Ellerby 10th overall in 2007.

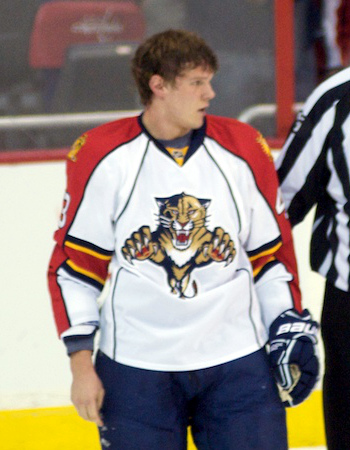
The Panthers selected Dmitri Kulikov 14th overall in 2009.

== See also ==
- 1993 NHL Expansion Draft
