= Kirk Nielsen =

American ice hockey player (born 1973)

- Born: October 19, 1973 (age 52) Grand Rapids, Minnesota, U.S.
- Height: 6 ft 1 in (185 cm)
- Weight: 205 lb (93 kg; 14 st 9 lb)
- Position: Right wing
- Shot: Right
- Played for: Boston Bruins
- NHL draft: 1994 NHL Supplemental Draft; Philadelphia Flyers
- Playing career: 1996–1999

Kirk G. Nielsen (born October 19, 1973) is an American former professional ice hockey player. He played 6 games in the NHL with the Boston Bruins during the 1997–98 season. The rest of his career, which lasted from 1996 to 1999, was spent in the minor leagues. He is the younger brother of Jeff Nielsen.

Selected tenth and last by the Philadelphia Flyers in the 1994 NHL Supplemental Draft, Nielsen was the final player chosen by this method, as the Supplemental Draft was discontinued after this season.

== Career statistics ==
=== Regular season and playoffs ===
			Regular season					Playoffs
Season	Team	League	GP	G	A	Pts	PIM	GP	G	A	Pts	PIM
1990–91	Grand Rapids High School	HS-MN	—	—	—	—	—	—	—	—	—	—
1991–92	Grand Rapids High School	HS-MN	—	—	—	—	—	—	—	—	—	—
1992–93	Harvard University	ECAC	30	2	2	4	38	—	—	—	—	—
1993–94	Harvard University	ECAC	32	6	9	15	41	—	—	—	—	—
1994–95	Harvard University	ECAC	30	13	8	21	24	—	—	—	—	—
1995–96	Harvard University	ECAC	31	12	16	28	66	—	—	—	—	—
1996–97	Providence Bruins	AHL	68	12	23	35	30	9	2	1	3	2
1997–98	Boston Bruins	NHL	6	0	0	0	0	—	—	—	—	—
1997–98	Providence Bruins	AHL	72	19	29	48	40	—	—	—	—	—
1998–99	Cincinnati Cyclones	IHL	82	12	22	34	58	3	0	0	0	4
NHL totals			6	0	0	0	0	—	—	—	—	—
