= NHL supplemental draft =

Defunct sport event

The NHL supplemental draft was a draft that was established by the National Hockey League as an offshoot of the NHL entry draft between 1986 and 1994. The supplemental draft was used by teams to select collegiate ice hockey players who were not eligible for the standard entry draft. It was created in response to the bidding wars between NHL teams to sign college hockey stars like Adam Oates and Ray Staszak, both of whom signed multi-year contracts with the Detroit Red Wings worth over one million dollars in 1985. The first draft was held on September 17, 1986, a month after the NHL Players' Association approved a new contract with the league allowing the owners to hold a two-round supplemental draft before the entry draft. In 1992, the supplemental draft was scaled back to a single round and limited to non-playoff teams from the previous season and first-year expansion teams. The supplemental draft was discontinued by the 1995 collective bargaining agreement.

Unlike the entry draft, most players selected never played in the NHL, although a few "diamonds in the rough" went on to NHL careers. Steve Rucchin played the most regular season games (735) among selections and was a team captain for the Mighty Ducks of Anaheim. John Cullen scored the most points (550) and was one of two selections to play in the NHL All-Star Game. The other, Bob Kudelski, is one of eight other selections who enjoyed NHL careers of at least 200 games with Cory Cross, Shawn Chambers, Todd Krygier, Jamie Baker, Steve Martins, Dave Snuggerud, and Steve Guolla rounding out the list.

== Eligible players ==
The eligibility rules for selecting players was as follows:

1. They were 21-years-old or older by December 31 of the draft year.
2. They had never been claimed in the NHL entry draft.
3. They had never previously played professional hockey.
4. They played at least one season of college hockey.

The first two supplemental drafts featured seven invalid claims, six of them (including Ian Kidd, who would have otherwise been the first ever supplemental draft selection) because the player entered college after age 20. The other invalid claim was of a player who hadn’t turned 21 yet.

== List of NHL supplemental drafts ==
Draft	Date	Rounds	Total drafted
1986	September 17, 1986	2	23
1987	June 13, 1987	2	21
1988	June 10, 1988	2	26
1989	June 16, 1989	2	26
1990	June 15, 1990	2	26
1991	June 21, 1991	2	28
1992	June 19, 1992	1	8
1993	June 25, 1993	1	10
1994	June 28, 1994	1	10
