= Jeff Nielsen =

American ice hockey player (born 1971)

- Born: September 20, 1971 (age 54) Grand Rapids, Minnesota, U.S.
- Height: 6 ft 0 in (183 cm)
- Weight: 195 lb (88 kg; 13 st 13 lb)
- Position: Right wing
- Shot: Right
- Played for: New York Rangers; Mighty Ducks of Anaheim; Minnesota Wild
- National team: United States
- NHL draft: 69th overall, 1990; New York Rangers
- Playing career: 1994–2001

Jeffrey Michael Nielsen (born September 20, 1971) is an American former professional ice hockey player who played as a right winger in the NHL for the New York Rangers, Mighty Ducks of Anaheim, and Minnesota Wild. He is the older brother of Kirk Nielsen.

== Playing career ==
Nielsen was drafted by the New York Rangers in the fourth round, 69th overall, in the 1990 NHL entry draft. Rather than immediately turning professional, Nielsen played four seasons of college hockey at the University of Minnesota. He steadily improved each year, leading the team in points during his senior season (1993–94) and earning a spot on the WCHA Second All-Star team.

After college, Nielsen joined the Rangers' minor league affiliate, the Binghamton Rangers. He played three years with Binghamton, notably scoring 53 points in 76 games during the 1996–97 season. That year, he also made his NHL debut, appearing in two games with the New York Rangers.

Nielsen then signed with the Mighty Ducks of Anaheim organization. He split the 1997–98 season between the Mighty Ducks and their minor league affiliate, the Cincinnati Mighty Ducks. For the 1998–99 season, Nielsen became a regular in the Anaheim lineup, playing 80 games and scoring 9 points. In the 1999–2000 season, Nielsen played in 79 games and scored an NHL career-high 18 points.

Nielsen was claimed in the 2000 NHL Expansion Draft by the Minnesota Wild. He played one season with the Wild before retiring from hockey in 2001.

== Career statistics ==
=== Regular season and playoffs ===
			Regular season					Playoffs
Season	Team	League	GP	G	A	Pts	PIM	GP	G	A	Pts	PIM
1987–88	Grand Rapids High School	HS-MN	21	9	11	20	14	—	—	—	—	—
1988–89	Grand Rapids High School	HS-MN	25	13	17	30	26	—	—	—	—	—
1989–90	Grand Rapids High School	HS-MN	28	32	25	57	—	—	—	—	—	—
1990–91	University of Minnesota	WCHA	45	11	14	25	50	—	—	—	—	—
1991–92	University of Minnesota	WCHA	44	15	15	30	74	—	—	—	—	—
1992–93	University of Minnesota	WCHA	42	21	20	41	74	—	—	—	—	—
1993–94	University of Minnesota	WCHA	41	29	16	45	94	—	—	—	—	—
1994–95	Binghamton Rangers	AHL	76	24	13	37	139	7	0	0	0	22
1995–96	Binghamton Rangers	AHL	64	22	20	42	56	4	1	1	2	4
1996–97	Binghamton Rangers	AHL	76	27	26	53	71	—	—	—	—	—
1996–97	New York Rangers	NHL	2	0	0	0	2	—	—	—	—	—
1997–98	Cincinnati Mighty Ducks	AHL	18	4	8	12	37	—	—	—	—	—
1997–98	Mighty Ducks of Anaheim	NHL	32	4	5	9	16	—	—	—	—	—
1998–99	Mighty Ducks of Anaheim	NHL	80	5	4	9	34	4	0	0	0	2
1999–00	Mighty Ducks of Anaheim	NHL	79	8	10	18	14	—	—	—	—	—
2000–01	Minnesota Wild	NHL	59	3	8	11	4	—	—	—	—	—
AHL totals			234	77	67	144	303	11	1	1	2	26
NHL totals			252	20	27	47	70	4	0	0	0	2

=== International ===
Year	Team	Event	GP	G	A	Pts	PIM
2000	United States	WC	7	1	1	2	2
Senior totals			7	1	1	2	2

== Awards and honors ==
Award	Year
All-WCHA Second Team	1993–94
WCHA All-Tournament Team	1994

Awards and achievements
Preceded by Brett Hauer	WCHA Student-Athlete of the Year; 1993–94; With: Brian Konowalchuk	Succeeded by Justin McHugh
