= 1994 ECAC Hockey men's ice hockey tournament =

1994 ECAC Men's ice hockey tournament
- Dates: March 8–19, 1994
- Teams: 10
- Finals site: Olympic Arena; Lake Placid, New York
- Champions: Harvard (4th title)
- Winning coach: Ronn Tomassoni (1st title)
- MVP: Sean McCann (Harvard)
- ECAC Men's Ice Hockey Tournaments

The 1994 ECAC Hockey Men's Ice Hockey Tournament was the 33rd tournament in league history. It was played between March 8 and March 19, 1994. Preliminary and quarterfinal games were played at home team campus sites, while the 'final four' games were played at the Olympic Arena (subsequently renamed Herb Brooks Arena) in Lake Placid, New York. By winning the tournament, Harvard received the ECAC's automatic bid to the 1994 NCAA Division I Men's Ice Hockey Tournament.

== Format ==
The tournament featured four rounds of play. The two teams that finish below tenth place in the standings are not eligible for tournament play. In the preliminary round, the seventh and tenth seeds and the eighth and ninth seeds each play a single game to determine the final qualifying teams for the quarterfinals. In the quarterfinals the first seed and lower ranked qualifier, the second and higher ranked qualifier, the third seed and sixth seed and the fourth seed and fifth seed played a modified best-of-three series, where the first team to receive 3 points moves on. After the opening round every series becomes a single-elimination game. In the semifinals, the highest seed plays the lowest remaining seed while the two remaining teams play with the winners advancing to the championship game and the losers advancing to the third place game. The tournament champion receives an automatic bid to the 1994 NCAA Division I Men's Ice Hockey Tournament.

== Conference standings ==
Note: GP = Games played; W = Wins; L = Losses; T = Ties; PTS = Points; GF = Goals For; GA = Goals Against

1993–94 ECAC Hockey standings
	Conference							Overall					
	GP	W	L	T	PTS	GF	GA	GP	W	L	T	GF	GA
Harvard†*	22	16	2	4	36	107	60	33	24	5	4	155	89
Clarkson	22	13	5	4	30	92	67	34	20	9	5	147	114
Rensselaer	22	12	6	4	28	99	75	36	21	11	4	171	115
Brown	22	12	7	3	27	91	73	32	15	13	4	116	117
Vermont	22	10	6	6	26	86	75	33	15	12	6	127	113
Union	22	10	9	3	23	83	89	30	15	11	4	117	118
Colgate	22	10	10	2	22	97	90	33	14	17	2	144	137
Cornell	22	7	10	5	19	73	89	30	8	17	5	97	126
Princeton	22	7	12	3	17	63	80	28	10	15	3	88	101
St. Lawrence	22	8	14	0	16	74	95	31	10	21	0	99	134
Yale	22	5	16	1	11	58	102	27	5	21	1	73	133
Dartmouth	22	4	17	1	9	80	111	27	5	21	1	94	137
Championship: Harvard † indicates conference regular season champion * indicates conference tournament champion (Whitelaw Cup)

== Bracket ==
Teams are reseeded after the first two rounds

Preliminary Round; March 8
7	Colgate	4
10	St. Lawrence	3
8	Cornell	5*
9	Princeton	4

Quarterfinals; March 11–13
1	Harvard	5	5	—
8	Cornell	4	3	—
2	Clarkson	7	5	—
7	Colgate	6	2	—
3	Rensselaer	3	5	8
6	Union	4	1	3
4	Brown	5	3	3
5	Vermont	8	2	2

Semifinals; March 18
1	Harvard	5
4	Brown	1
2	Clarkson	2
3	Rensselaer	6

Championship; March 19
1	Harvard	3
3	Rensselaer	0
Third Place
2	Clarkson	6
4	Brown	2

Note: * denotes overtime period(s)

=== Preliminary round ===
==== (7) Colgate vs. (10) St. Lawrence ====
March 8	Colgate	4 – 3	St. Lawrence	Starr Rink

==== (8) Cornell vs. (9) Princeton ====
March 8	Cornell	5 – 4	OT	Princeton	Lynah Rink

=== Quarterfinals ===
==== (1) Harvard vs. (8) Cornell ====
March 11	Harvard	5 – 4	Cornell	Bright Hockey Center

March 12	Harvard	5 – 3	Cornell	Bright Hockey Center

Harvard won series 2–0

==== (2) Clarkson vs. (7) Colgate ====
March 11	Clarkson	7 – 6	Colgate	Cheel Arena

March 12	Clarkson	5 – 2	Colgate	Cheel Arena

Clarkson won series 2–0

==== (3) Rensselaer vs. (6) Union ====
March 11	Rensselaer	3 – 4	Union	Houston Field House

March 12	Rensselaer	5 – 1	Union	Houston Field House

March 13	Rensselaer	8 – 5	Union	Houston Field House

Rensselaer won series 2–1

==== (4) Brown vs. (5) Vermont ====
March 11	Brown	5 – 8	Vermont	Meehan Auditorium

March 12	Brown	3 – 2	Vermont	Meehan Auditorium

March 13	Brown	3 – 2	Vermont	Meehan Auditorium

Brown won series 2–1

=== Semifinals ===
==== (1) Harvard vs. (4) Brown ====
March 18	Harvard	5 – 1	Brown	Olympic Arena

==== (2) Clarkson vs. (3) Rensselaer ====
March 18	Clarkson	2 – 6	Rensselaer	Olympic Arena

=== Third place ===
==== (2) Clarkson vs. (4) Brown ====
March 19	Clarkson	6 – 2	Brown	Olympic Arena

=== Championship ===
==== (1) Harvard vs. (3) Rensselaer ====
March 19	Harvard	3 – 0	Rensselaer	Olympic Arena

== Tournament awards ==
=== All-Tournament Team ===
- F Bryan Richardson (Rensselaer)
- F Steve Martins (Harvard)
- F Craig Conroy (Clarkson)
- D Derek Maguire (Harvard)
- D Sean McCann* (Harvard)
- G Aaron Israel (Harvard)

* Most Outstanding Player(s)
