= Ylitornio =

Ylitornio Övertorneå Badje-Duortnus Pajetuárnus
- Municipality
- Ylitornion kunta Övertorneå kommun
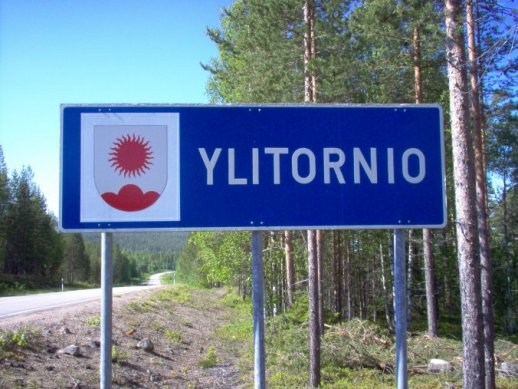
- Ylitornio welcome sign

- Coat of arms

- Location of Ylitornio in Finland
- OpenStreetMap Interactive map outlining Ylitornio.
- Interactive map of Ylitornio
- Coordinates: 66°19′N 023°40′E
- Country: Finland
- Region: Lapland
- Sub-region: Tornio Valley
- Charter: 1809

Government
  - Municipal manager: Jarmo Pienimäki

Area (2018-01-01)
  - Total: 2,212.47 km^{2} (854.24 sq mi)
  - Land: 2,029.3 km^{2} (783.5 sq mi)
  - Water: 183.83 km^{2} (70.98 sq mi)
  - Rank: 29th largest in Finland

Population (2025-12-31)
  - Total: 3,673
  - Rank: 196th largest in Finland
  - Density: 1.81/km^{2} (4.7/sq mi)

Population by native language
  - Finnish: 94.9% (official)
  - Swedish: 0.7%
  - Others: 4.3%

Population by age
  - 0 to 14: 9.8%
  - 15 to 64: 51.6%
  - 65 or older: 38.5%
- Time zone: UTC+02:00 (EET)
  - Summer (DST): UTC+03:00 (EEST)
- Website: ylitornio.fi

Ylitornio (Finnish: [ˈyliˌtornio]; Swedish: Övertorneå; Northern Sami: Badje-Duortnus; Inari Sami: Pajetuárnus) is a municipality of Finland. It is located in the province of Lapland along the Tornio River, opposite the Swedish town of Övertorneå about 7 kilometres (4.3 mi) by road to its northwest. The two localities are connected by an international bridge that goes between Övertorneå through an island and enters Finland in a rural portion of Ylitornio's municipality, about 5 kilometres (3.1 mi) north of town. Literally translated to English the two locations would be called Upper Tornio.

The municipality has a population of 3,673 (31 December 2025) and covers an area of 2,212.47 square kilometres (854.24 sq mi) of which 183.83 km^{2} (70.98 sq mi) is water. The population density is 1.81 inhabitants per square kilometre (4.7/sq mi). The municipality is unilingually Finnish in contrast to much of far-western Finland. Finland is officially bilingual.

The motif of the coat of arms of Ylitornio Municipality refers to the Aavasaksa hill and the midnight sun. The coat of arms was designed by Jaakko Hänninen, and the Ylitornio Municipal Council approved it at its meeting on 28 September 1953. The Ministry of the Interior confirmed the coat of arms for use on 5 April 1954.

A ski flying hill project has been presented. The inruns of the hills will be through a mountain inside a pipe tunnel.

== Climate ==
Ylitornio has a subarctic climate (Köppen: Dfc) with long, harsh winters and short, mild summers.

Climate data for Ylitornio Meltosjärvi, 1991–2020 normals, records 1964–present)
Month	Jan	Feb	Mar	Apr	May	Jun	Jul	Aug	Sep	Oct	Nov	Dec	Year
Record high °C (°F)	8.0 (46.4)	7.4 (45.3)	11.6 (52.9)	18.7 (65.7)	29.7 (85.5)	32.8 (91.0)	33.3 (91.9)	30.6 (87.1)	24.4 (75.9)	14.3 (57.7)	9.2 (48.6)	5.7 (42.3)	33.3 (91.9)
Mean daily maximum °C (°F)	−7.2 (19.0)	−6.8 (19.8)	−0.8 (30.6)	5.1 (41.2)	12.1 (53.8)	18.1 (64.6)	21.1 (70.0)	18.3 (64.9)	12.1 (53.8)	3.9 (39.0)	−1.8 (28.8)	−4.8 (23.4)	5.8 (42.4)
Daily mean °C (°F)	−11.4 (11.5)	−11.1 (12.0)	−6.0 (21.2)	0.3 (32.5)	6.8 (44.2)	12.7 (54.9)	15.6 (60.1)	13.0 (55.4)	7.6 (45.7)	0.8 (33.4)	−4.7 (23.5)	−8.5 (16.7)	1.3 (34.3)
Mean daily minimum °C (°F)	−16.4 (2.5)	−16.0 (3.2)	−11.7 (10.9)	−4.7 (23.5)	1.5 (34.7)	7.2 (45.0)	10.1 (50.2)	7.9 (46.2)	3.7 (38.7)	−2.1 (28.2)	−8.0 (17.6)	−12.8 (9.0)	−3.4 (25.9)
Record low °C (°F)	−45.8 (−50.4)	−45.2 (−49.4)	−38.5 (−37.3)	−28.9 (−20.0)	−12.7 (9.1)	−2.6 (27.3)	−0.9 (30.4)	−4.1 (24.6)	−11.1 (12.0)	−29.2 (−20.6)	−34.6 (−30.3)	−39.8 (−39.6)	−45.8 (−50.4)
Average precipitation mm (inches)	37 (1.5)	32 (1.3)	33 (1.3)	30 (1.2)	37 (1.5)	69 (2.7)	74 (2.9)	63 (2.5)	50 (2.0)	50 (2.0)	48 (1.9)	41 (1.6)	564 (22.2)
Average precipitation days (≥ 1.0 mm)	10	9	8	7	7	10	11	9	9	10	12	11	113
Source 1: FMI normals 1991-2020
Source 2: Record highs and lows

== Notable people ==
- Sami Jauhojärvi, skier
- Jarkko Kauvosaari, ice hockey player
- Toni Koivisto, ice hockey player
- Rosa Liksom, author

== See also ==
- Aavasaksa, a hill in Ylitornio
- Övertorneå, a municipality of Sweden
