= Jarkko Kauvosaari =

Finnish ice hockey player

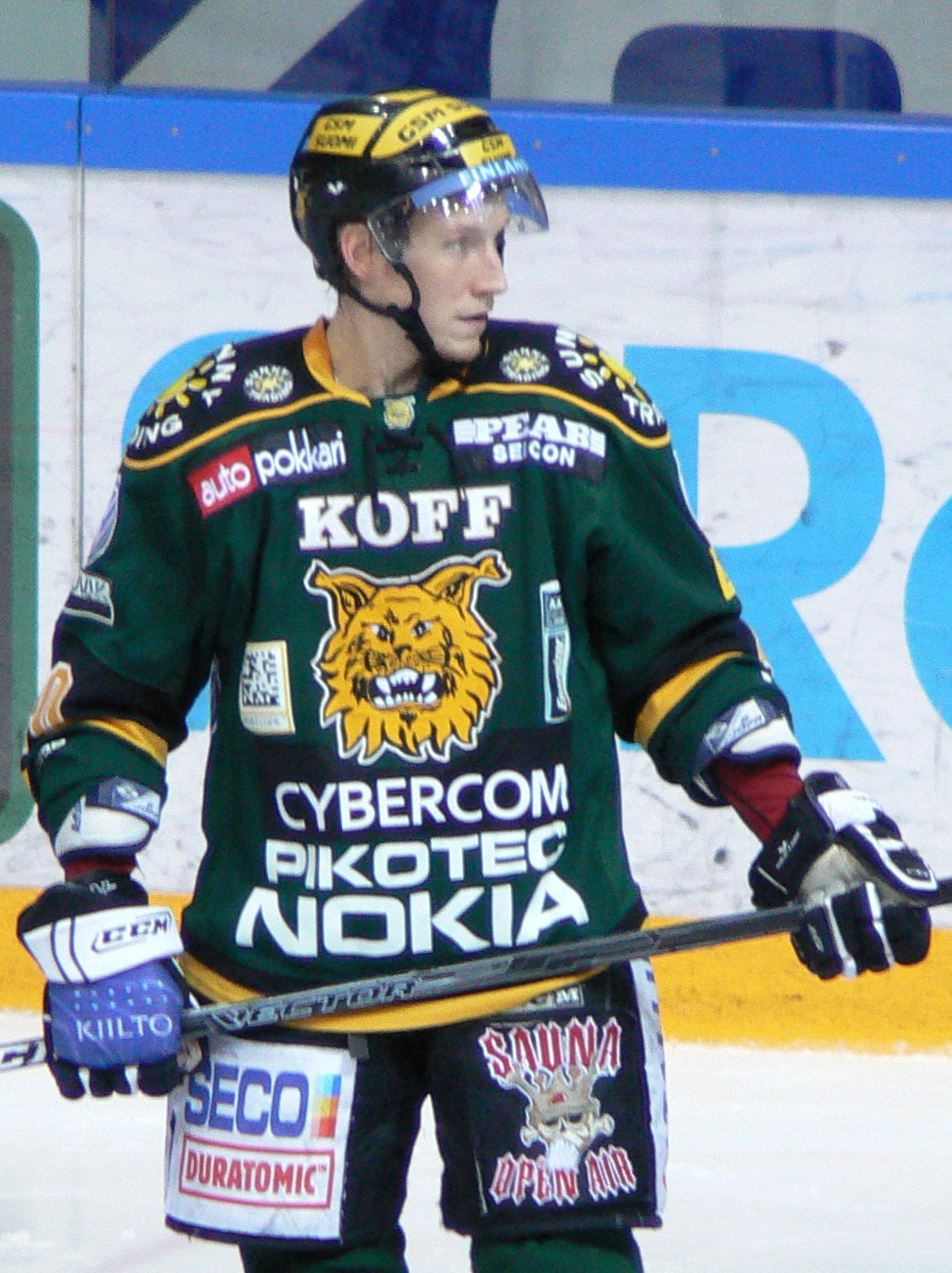
- Born: October 17, 1983 (age 41); Ylitornio, Finland
- Height: 6 ft 1 in (185 cm)
- Weight: 192 lb (87 kg; 13 st 10 lb)
- Position: Centre
- Shot: Left
- Played for: Lukko; KalPa; Ilves; Vaasan Sport
- NHL draft: Undrafted
- Playing career: 2003–2014

Jarkko Kauvosaari (born October 17, 1983) is a Finnish professional ice hockey player. He currently plays for Lukko in the SM-liiga.

== Career statistics ==
			Regular season					Playoffs
Season	Team	League	GP	G	A	Pts	PIM	GP	G	A	Pts	PIM
2000–01	Vaasan Sport U18	U18 SM-sarja	17	4	6	10	59	18	9	4	13	8
2000–01	Vaasan Sport U20	U20 SM-liiga	1	0	0	0	0	—	—	—	—	—
2001–02	Vaasan Sport U20	U20 SM-liiga	28	7	10	17	14	2	0	1	1	0
2002–03	Lukko U20	U20 SM-liiga	35	11	12	23	12	—	—	—	—	—
2003–04	Lukko U20	U20 SM-liiga	21	13	15	28	16	—	—	—	—	—
2003–04	Lukko	SM-liiga	33	1	2	3	10	1	0	0	0	0
2004–05	Lukko	SM-liiga	35	0	0	0	4	4	0	0	0	0
2005–06	Lukko	SM-liiga	56	3	5	8	26	—	—	—	—	—
2006–07	Lukko	SM-liiga	9	0	0	0	4	—	—	—	—	—
2006–07	KalPa	SM-liiga	43	12	10	22	59	—	—	—	—	—
2007–08	KalPa	SM-liiga	56	11	14	25	32	—	—	—	—	—
2008–09	Ilves	SM-liiga	58	12	16	28	24	3	0	1	1	0
2009–10	Ilves	SM-liiga	58	14	10	24	38	—	—	—	—	—
2010–11	Lukko	SM-liiga	52	8	5	13	16	13	1	1	2	6
2011–12	Lukko	SM-liiga	59	8	6	14	14	3	1	0	1	2
2012–13	Lukko	SM-liiga	47	6	3	9	18	8	0	1	1	2
2013–14	Lukko	Liiga	4	0	0	0	0	—	—	—	—	—
2013–14	Vaasan Sport	Mestis	5	1	2	3	0	—	—	—	—	—
SM-liiga totals			510	75	71	146	245	32	2	3	5	10
