= Sean McCann (ice hockey) =

Canadian ice hockey player

- Born: September 18, 1971 (age 53); North York, Ontario, Canada
- Height: 6 ft 0 in (183 cm)
- Weight: 194 lb (88 kg; 13 st 12 lb)
- Position: Defence
- Shot: Right
- Played for: Harvard; Cincinnati Cyclones; Carolina Monarchs; Grand Rapids Griffins; Milwaukee Admirals; Orlando Solar Bears; Springfield Falcons; Syracuse Crunch; Houston Aeros
- Current coach: Saint Sebastian's School
- Coached for: Harvard (Assistant)
- NHL draft: 1994 NHL Supplemental Draft; Florida Panthers
- Playing career: 1990–2001
- Coaching career: 2002–present

Sean McCann (born September 18, 1971) is a Canadian ice hockey coach and former defenceman who was an All-American for Harvard.

== Career ==
McCann was a member of Ronn Tomassoni's first recruiting class at Harvard. He played a solid defensive game for the Crimson, helping the team to a decent record as a freshman. The team finished atop their conference standings in his sophomore and junior seasons while being one of the best defensive teams in the country. In 1993 Harvard returned to the NCAA Tournament for the first time since winning the championship in 1989 but were undone by a double overtime loss in the opening round.

For his senior season, McCann was named team captain and went on to produce a rather astounding career year. He more than quadrupled his previous years point total and more than quintupled his goal production. He led the team to its third consecutive first-place finish in ECAC Hockey and the programs' first conference championship in seven years. Harvard received the second eastern seed and a bye into the NCAA quarterfinals. The Crimson easily handled New Hampshire to make the Frozen Four but couldn't overcome eventual champion Lake Superior State, losing 2–3 in overtime. McCann was named an All-American for the year and was drafted first overall in the 1994 NHL Supplemental Draft, the final such draft held.

McCann continued his new-found production as a professional, playing well during the 94–95 season and then doubling his point production in year two at the top level of the minor leagues. Unfortunately, McCann never received an appearance at the NHL level despite producing on both good and bad teams in AAA hockey. After 6 seasons as a professional, McCann retired in 2001.

After a season away from the game, McCann returned as an assistant coach at his alma mater. He helped Harvard win two more conference titles and make four consecutive NCAA appearances (losing every game) during his 7-year stint behind the bench. In 2009 McCann left Harvard to become the head coach at Saint Sebastian's School, a highly regarded prep school. While there he instructed several future star players including Noah Hanifin and Danny O'Regan. He continued to serve as the leader for the program as of 2021.

He was inducted into the Harvard Athletic Hall of Fame in 2009.

== Statistics ==
=== Regular season and playoffs ===
			Regular Season					Playoffs
Season	Team	League	GP	G	A	Pts	PIM	GP	G	A	Pts	PIM
1987–88	Richmond Hill Dukes	MetJHL	1	0	0	0	10	—	—	—	—	—
1989–90	Thornhill Thunderbirds	MetJHL	42	12	19	32	111	—	—	—	—	—
1990–91	Harvard	ECAC Hockey	29	2	9	11	88	—	—	—	—	—
1991–92	Harvard	ECAC Hockey	27	4	11	15	51	—	—	—	—	—
1992–93	Harvard	ECAC Hockey	31	4	5	9	36	—	—	—	—	—
1993–94	Harvard	ECAC Hockey	33	22	17	39	82	—	—	—	—	—
1994–95	Cincinnati Cyclones	IHL	76	10	12	22	58	10	0	2	2	8
1995–96	Carolina Monarchs	AHL	80	14	33	47	61	—	—	—	—	—
1996–97	Grand Rapids Griffins	IHL	76	8	26	34	46	5	0	0	0	2
1997–98	Milwaukee Admirals	IHL	33	6	11	17	37	—	—	—	—	—
1997–98	Orlando Solar Bears	IHL	26	5	3	8	30	—	—	—	—	—
1998–99	Orlando Solar Bears	IHL	42	4	9	13	28	—	—	—	—	—
1998–99	Springfield Falcons	AHL	31	8	15	23	31	3	0	1	1	4
1999–00	Springfield Falcons	AHL	62	5	38	43	77	—	—	—	—	—
1999–00	Syracuse Crunch	AHL	11	0	9	9	12	4	0	2	2	0
2000–01	Houston Aeros	IHL	82	12	18	30	50	7	1	2	3	0
NCAA totals			120	32	38	70	257	—	—	—	—	—
AHL totals			184	27	95	122	181	7	0	3	3	0
IHL totals			335	45	79	124	249	22	1	4	5	10

== Awards and honours ==
Award	Year
All-ECAC Hockey First Team	1993–94
AHCA East First-Team All-American	1993–94
ECAC Hockey All-Tournament Team	1994

Awards and achievements
Preceded by Chris Rogles	ECAC Hockey Most Outstanding Player in Tournament; 1994	Succeeded by Mike Tamburro
