= Aavasaksa =

Hill in Ylitornio, Finnish Lapland

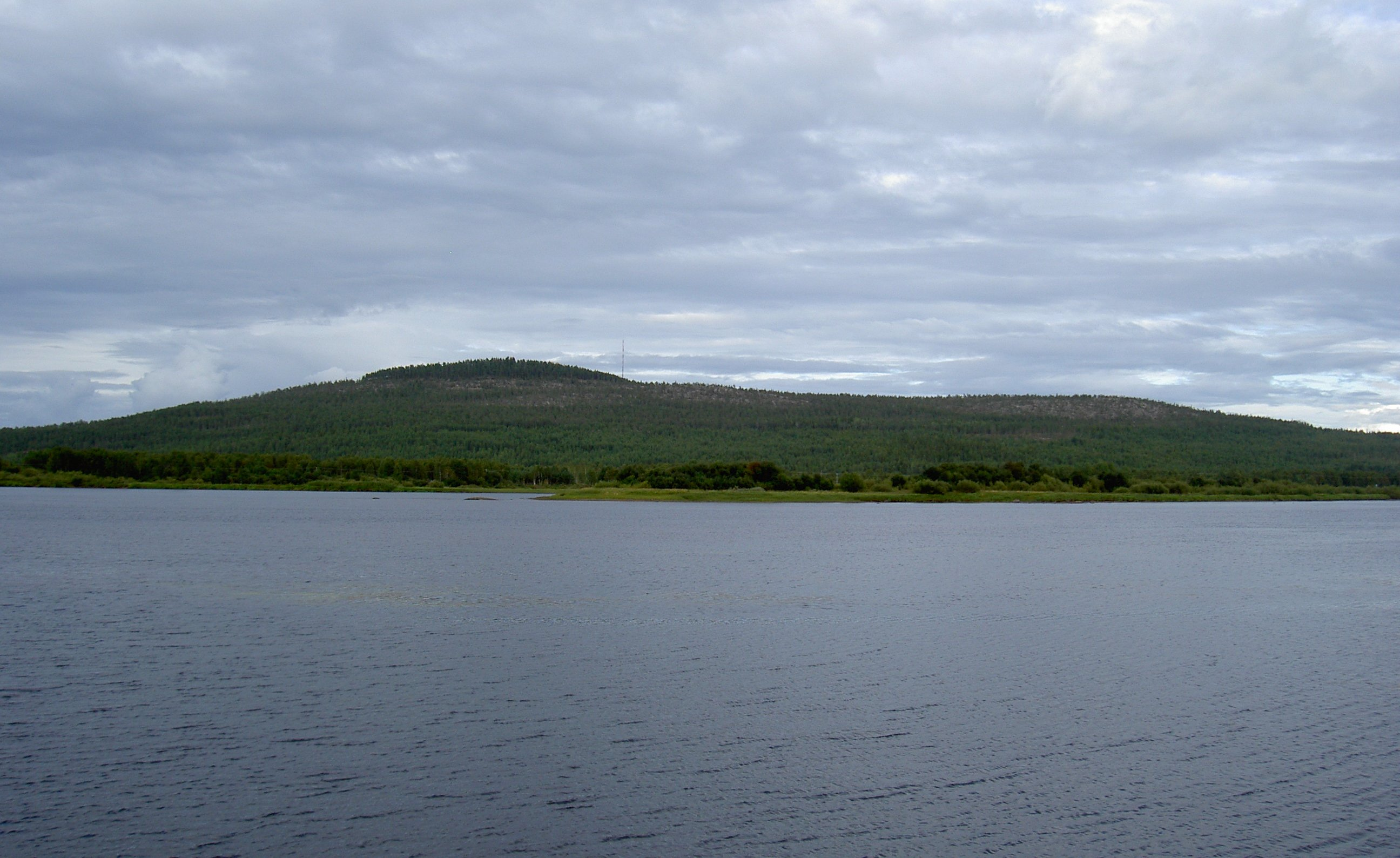
- Aavasaksa from Övertorneå central town (Matarengi).

Highest point
- Elevation: 242 m (794 ft)
- Coordinates: 66°23′52″N 23°43′30″E

Geography
- Location within Finland
- Location: Lapland, Finland

Aavasaksa is a sharp-edged hill in Ylitornio municipality in Finnish Lapland. It has an elevation of 242 metres (794 ft). Aavasaksa is famous for its sights both towards Finland and Sweden, and it is included in the list of the National landscapes of Finland. Decorative hunting cabin "Imperial Lodge" (Keisarinmaja) is one of the buildings on top of the hill. Its construction began with a visit by Alexander II of Russia in mind, but due to political instability it never happened. It's only open in the summer.

Due to Aavasaksa's distinctive elevation above other nearby hills, it was first used by Pierre Louis Maupertuis in the French Geodesic Mission (1736–1737), and later became part of the Struve Geodetic Arc. As a result of this, UNESCO named Aavasaksa a World Heritage Site, along with the 33 other sites used in the Struve Geodetic Arc.

Aavasaksa is often considered the southernmost point in Finland where the midnight sun is literally visible. The hill is surrounded by rivers running next to it: Torne River to the west and the smaller Tengeliönjoki to the east and north.

Asteroid 2678 Aavasaksa is named after the hill.

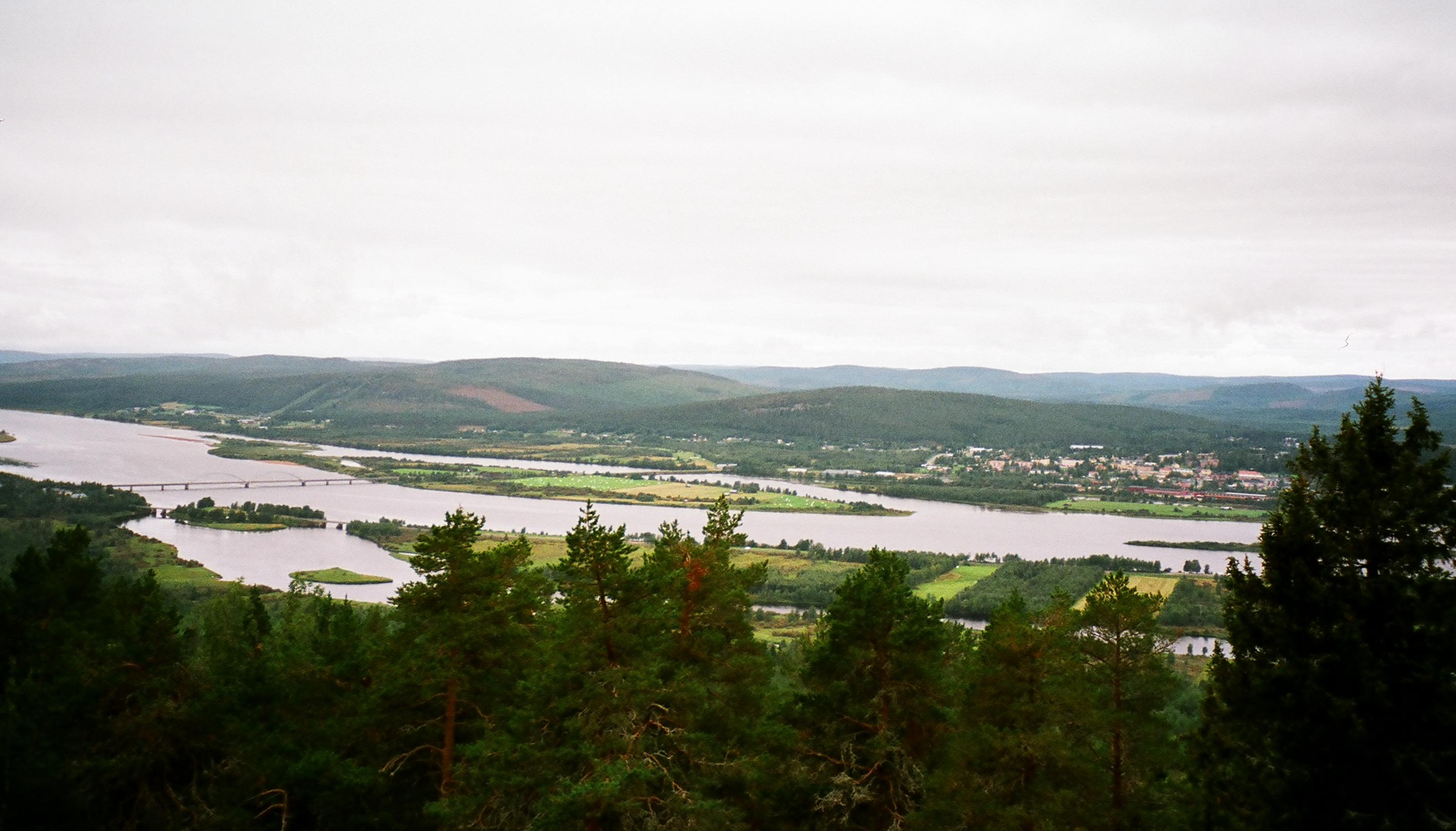
View from the observation tower atop Aavasaksa hill to the west towards Torne River and Sweden

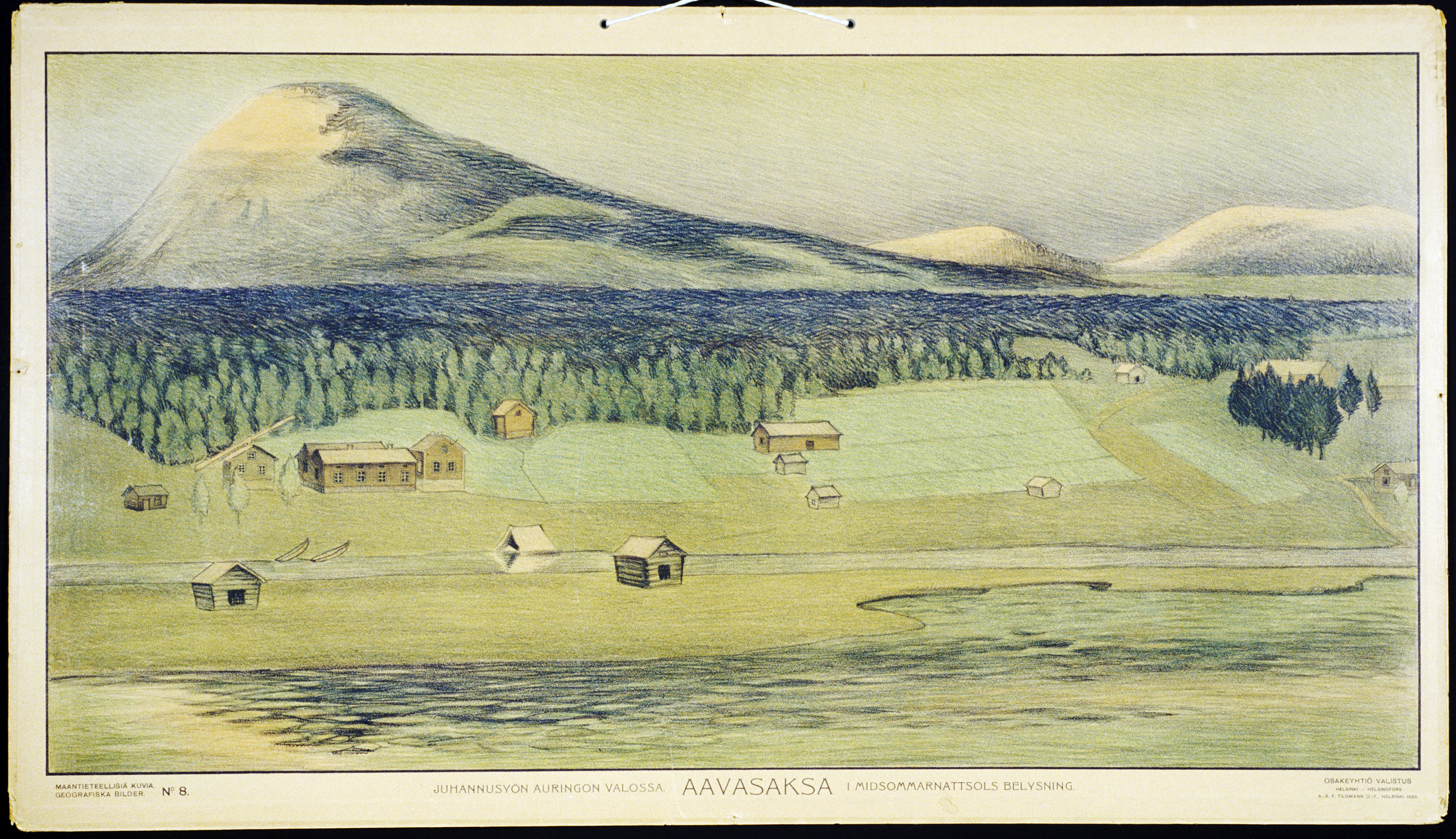
Aavasaksa, educational poster by Eero Järnefelt, 1905
