= 2678 Aavasaksa =

Main-belt asteroid

Discovery
- Discovered by: Y. Väisälä
- Discovery site: Turku Obs.
- Discovery date: 24 February 1938

Designations
- Named after: Aavasaksa (hill in Finnish Lapland)
- Alternative designations: 1938 DF_{1} · 1952 KM; 1955 DH · 1977 SX_{1} 1979 FP_{2} · A916 WA
- Minor planet category: main-belt · Flora

Orbital characteristics
- Epoch 4 September 2017 (JD 2458000.5)
- Uncertainty parameter 0
- Observation arc: 79.20 yr (28,927 days)
- Aphelion: 2.4553 AU
- Perihelion: 2.0636 AU
- Semi-major axis: 2.2594 AU
- Eccentricity: 0.0867
- Orbital period (sidereal): 3.40 yr (1,240 days)
- Mean anomaly: 204.08°
- Mean motion: 0° 17^{m} 24.72^{s} / day
- Inclination: 3.4446°
- Longitude of ascending node: 54.033°
- Argument of perihelion: 45.844°

Physical characteristics
- Dimensions: 8.19 km (calculated); 8.371±0.096 km
- Synodic rotation period: 24 h
- Geometric albedo: 0.24 (assumed); 0.276±0.037
- Spectral type: S
- Absolute magnitude (H): 12.4 · 12.6

2678 Aavasaksa, provisional designation 1938 DF_{1}, is a stony Flora asteroid from the inner regions of the asteroid belt, approximately 8 kilometers in diameter.

The asteroid was discovered on 24 February 1938, by Finnish astronomer Yrjö Väisälä at Turku Observatory in Southwest Finland. It was named for the Aavasaksa hill in Finland.

== Orbit and classification ==
The S-type asteroid is a member of the Flora family, one of the largest groups of stony asteroids in the main-belt. It orbits the Sun in the inner main-belt at a distance of 2.1–2.5 AU once every 3 years and 5 months (1,240 days). Its orbit has an eccentricity of 0.09 and an inclination of 3° with respect to the ecliptic.

Aavasaksa was first identified as A916 WA at Bergedorf Observatory in 1916. Its observation arc begins at Mount Wilson Observatory in 1935, or 3 years prior to its official discovery observation at Turku.

== Physical characteristics ==
In January 2009, a provisional and fragmentary photometric lightcurve of Aavasaksa was obtained at the Via Capote Observatory in California. Lightcurve analysis indicated a longer than average rotation period of 24 hours with a brightness amplitude of 0.4 magnitude (U=1).

According to a survey carried out by the NEOWISE mission of NASA's space-based Wide-field Infrared Survey Explorer, Aavasaksa measures 8.4 kilometers in diameter and has a surface albedo of 0.28. By contrast, the Collaborative Asteroid Lightcurve Link assumes an albedo of 0.24, derived from 8 Flora, the Flora family's largest member and namesake, and calculates a diameter of 8.2 kilometers.

== Naming ==
This minor planet is named after Aavasaksa, a sharp-edged hill in Finnish Lapland, just south of the Arctic Circle. The hill is located in the Tornio River Valley, after which the minor planet 1471 Tornio is named, and is often considered the southernmost point in Finland where the natural phenomenon of the midnight sun is visible each June. The official naming citation was published by the Minor Planet Center on 26 May 1983 (M.P.C. 7947).
