= Steve Martins =

Canadian ice hockey player (born 1972)

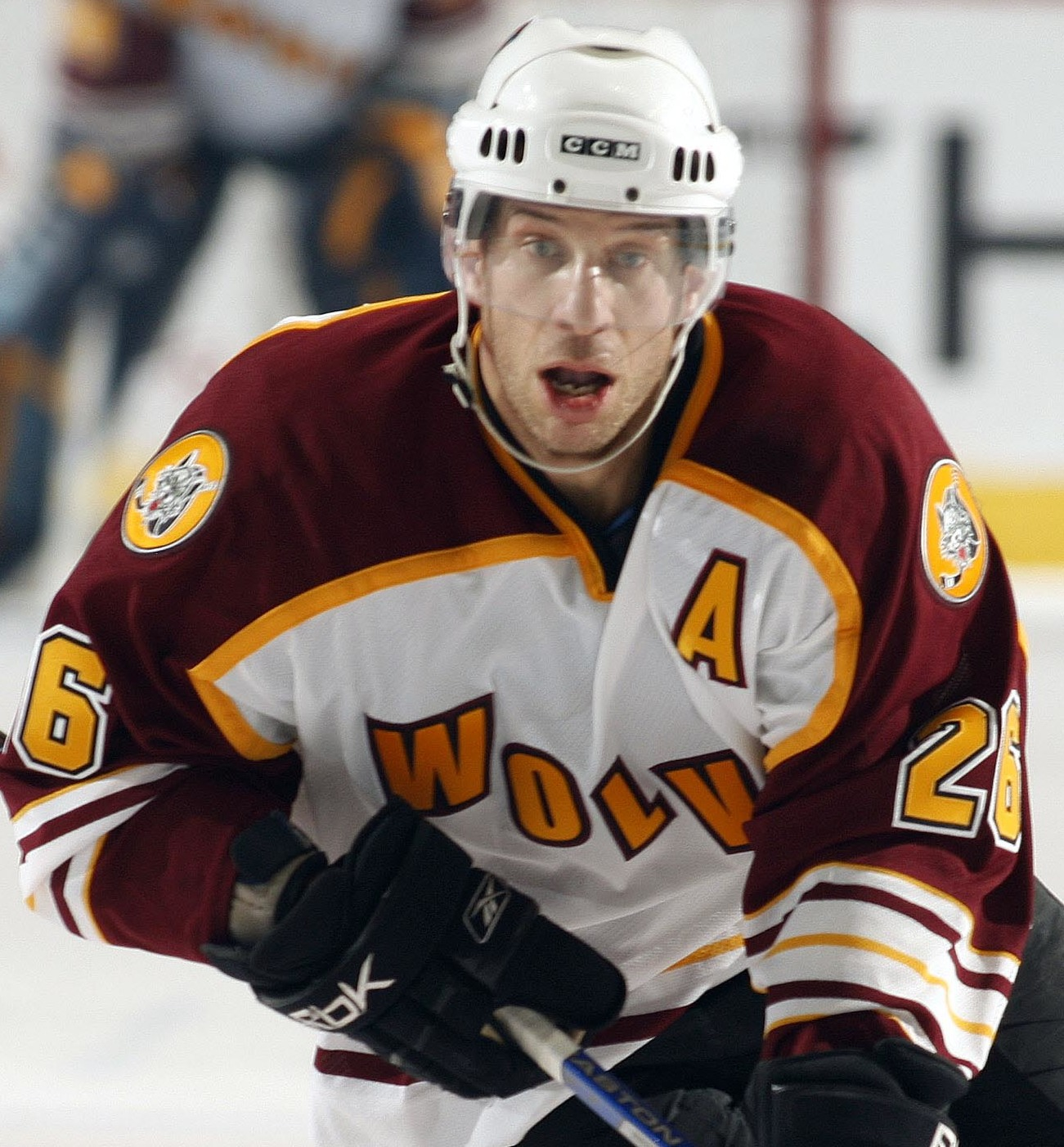
- Martins with the Chicago Wolves in 2007
- Born: April 13, 1972 (age 54) Gatineau, Quebec, Canada
- Height: 5 ft 9 in (175 cm)
- Weight: 185 lb (84 kg; 13 st 3 lb)
- Position: Centre
- Shot: Left
- Played for: Hartford Whalers; Carolina Hurricanes; Ottawa Senators; Tampa Bay Lightning; New York Islanders; St. Louis Blues
- NHL draft: 1994 NHL Supplemental Draft; Hartford Whalers
- Playing career: 1995–2009

Steve P. Martins (born April 13, 1972) is a Canadian former professional ice hockey player who played in the National Hockey League (NHL).

== Biography ==
As a youth, Martins played in the 1986 Quebec International Pee-Wee Hockey Tournament with a minor ice hockey team from Gatineau, Quebec. He attended Choate Rosemary Hall, and later attended Harvard University, graduating in 1995.

Martins was drafted in the 1994 NHL Supplemental Draft by the Hartford Whalers. Martins played professional hockey from 1995 until 2009 primarily in minor leagues. He played 267 NHL games with the Hartford Whalers, Carolina Hurricanes, Tampa Bay Lightning, New York Islanders, St. Louis Blues, and the Ottawa Senators. Martins' best season in the NHL was 1999–2000 with the Tampa Bay Lightning, recording 5 goals and 17 assists in 57 games. In his career, he scored 21 goals and 25 assists.

His best minor league season was 2005–06 with the Binghamton Senators when he recorded 22 goals and 58 assists. He finished his career with the Chicago Wolves in 2008–09.

== Career statistics ==
			Regular season					Playoffs
Season	Team	League	GP	G	A	Pts	PIM	GP	G	A	Pts	PIM
1988–89	Outaouais Frontaliers	QMAAA	38	18	33	51	70	—	—	—	—	—
1989–90	Choate Rosemary Hall	HS-Prep
1990–91	Choate Rosemary Hall	HS-Prep
1991–92	Harvard University	ECAC	20	13	14	27	26	—	—	—	—	—
1992–93	Harvard University	ECAC	18	6	8	14	40	—	—	—	—	—
1993–94	Harvard University	ECAC	32	25	35	60	93	—	—	—	—	—
1994–95	Harvard University	ECAC	28	15	23	38	93	—	—	—	—	—
1995–96	Springfield Falcons	AHL	30	9	20	29	10	—	—	—	—	—
1995–96	Hartford Whalers	NHL	23	1	3	4	8	—	—	—	—	—
1996–97	Springfield Falcons	AHL	63	12	31	43	78	17	1	3	4	26
1996–97	Hartford Whalers	NHL	2	0	1	1	0	—	—	—	—	—
1997–98	Chicago Wolves	IHL	78	20	41	61	122	21	6	14	20	28
1997–98	Carolina Hurricanes	NHL	3	0	0	0	0	—	—	—	—	—
1998–99	Detroit Vipers	IHL	4	1	6	7	16	—	—	—	—	—
1998–99	Ottawa Senators	NHL	36	4	3	7	10	—	—	—	—	—
1999–00	Ottawa Senators	NHL	2	1	0	1	0	—	—	—	—	—
1999–00	Tampa Bay Lightning	NHL	57	5	7	12	37	—	—	—	—	—
2000–01	Detroit Vipers	IHL	8	5	4	9	4	—	—	—	—	—
2000–01	Tampa Bay Lightning	NHL	20	1	1	2	13	—	—	—	—	—
2000–01	Chicago Wolves	IHL	5	1	2	3	0	16	1	6	7	22
2000–01	New York Islanders	NHL	39	1	3	4	20	—	—	—	—	—
2001–02	Grand Rapids Griffins	AHL	51	10	21	31	66	3	0	0	0	0
2001–02	Ottawa Senators	NHL	14	1	0	1	4	2	0	0	0	0
2002–03	Binghamton Senators	AHL	26	5	11	16	31	—	—	—	—	—
2002–03	Ottawa Senators	NHL	14	2	3	5	10	—	—	—	—	—
2002–03	St. Louis Blues	NHL	28	3	3	6	18	2	0	1	1	0
2003–04	Worcester IceCats	AHL	22	4	9	13	16	—	—	—	—	—
2003–04	St. Louis Blues	NHL	25	1	0	1	22	1	0	0	0	0
2004–05	JYP	SM-l	54	13	12	25	66	3	0	0	0	4
2005–06	Binghamton Senators	AHL	76	22	58	80	80	—	—	—	—	—
2005–06	Ottawa Senators	NHL	4	1	1	2	0	—	—	—	—	—
2006–07	Chicago Wolves	AHL	48	13	26	39	49	—	—	—	—	—
2007–08	Chicago Wolves	AHL	76	17	40	57	78	22	2	7	9	30
2008–09	Chicago Wolves	AHL	55	13	20	33	58	—	—	—	—	—
AHL totals			447	105	236	341	466	42	3	10	13	56
NHL totals			267	21	25	46	142	5	0	1	1	0

== Awards and honors ==
Award	Year
All-ECAC Hockey Rookie Team	1991–92
All-ECAC Hockey First Team	1993–94
AHCA East First-Team All-American	1993–94
ECAC Hockey All-Tournament Team	1994

Awards and achievements
Preceded by Ted Drury	ECAC Hockey Player of the Year; 1993–94	Succeeded by Martin St. Louis
