= 1994 NHL supplemental draft =

Player selection draft

General information
- Date(s): June 28, 1994

Overview
- 10 total selections in 1 rounds
- First selection: (Canada) Sean McCann (Florida Panthers)

The 1994 NHL supplemental draft was the ninth and final NHL supplemental draft. It was held on June 28, 1994. It was limited to the ten teams that missed the 1994 Stanley Cup playoffs.

== Selections ==
Pick #	Player	Nationality	NHL team	College (league)
1	Sean McCann (D)	Canada	Florida Panthers	Harvard University (ECAC)
2	Steve Rucchin (C)	Canada	Mighty Ducks of Anaheim	University of Western Ontario (OUAA)
3	Steve Guolla (LW)	Canada	Ottawa Senators	Michigan State University (CCHA)
4	Randy Stevens (RW)	United States	Winnipeg Jets	Michigan Technological University (WCHA)
5	Steve Martins (C)	Canada	Hartford Whalers	Harvard University (ECAC)
6	Chad Dameworth (D)	United States	Edmonton Oilers	Northern Michigan University (WCHA)
7	Quinn Fair (D)	Canada	Los Angeles Kings	Kent State University (CCHA)
8	Francois Bouchard (D)	Canada	Tampa Bay Lightning	Northeastern University (Hockey East)
9	Reid Simonton (D)	Canada	Quebec Nordiques	Union College (ECAC)
10	Kirk Nielsen (RW)	United States	Philadelphia Flyers	Harvard University (ECAC)

== See also ==
- 1994 NHL entry draft
- 1994–95 NHL season
- List of NHL players
