= Steve Rucchin =

Canadian ice hockey player (born 1971)

- Born: July 4, 1971 (age 55) Thunder Bay, Ontario, Canada
- Height: 6 ft 2 in (188 cm)
- Weight: 210 lb (95 kg; 15 st 0 lb)
- Position: Centre
- Shot: Left
- Played for: Mighty Ducks of Anaheim; New York Rangers; Atlanta Thrashers
- National team: Canada
- NHL draft: 1994 NHL Supplemental Draft; Mighty Ducks of Anaheim
- Playing career: 1994–2007

Steve Andrew Rucchin (/ˈruːtʃɪn/; born July 4, 1971) is a Canadian former professional ice hockey centre who played for three teams in the National Hockey League, most notably for the Mighty Ducks of Anaheim.

== Playing career ==
Rucchin played high school hockey for Sir Frederick Banting Secondary School in London, Ontario. His coach happened to also be an assistant with the University of Western Ontario and recruited him. He was an Ontario University All-Star in three of his four seasons there, and was named Player of the Year and First-team All-Canadian in his senior season. He was drafted 2nd overall in the 1994 NHL Supplemental Draft by the Mighty Ducks of Anaheim.

He soon centered Anaheim's top line with Paul Kariya and Teemu Selänne, a major feat for a former CIS player. Though there are numerous former NCAA players in the NHL, Canadian Interuniversity Sport alumni are few and far between in the NHL, let alone a top line center. Rucchin was an alternate captain from 2000–2003, and captain in 2003–05. In the 2003 Stanley Cup Playoffs, Rucchin earned his spot in Mighty Ducks immortality when he helped the Ducks upset the Detroit Red Wings in a sweep of four games by scoring the game-winning and series-clinching overtime goal in Game 4. At the 1998 World Championship in Switzerland, he and his older brother Larry made history when they faced each other, with Steve playing for Canada, while Larry played for Italy.

In August 2005, he was traded to the New York Rangers for minor-league enforcer Trevor Gillies and a conditional 2007 draft pick in a move to dump salary. He ranks fifth in Ducks history in assists (279), goals (153), points (432), and game-winning goals (23). Known as a great locker-room teammate, he provided veteran leadership in 2005–06, as an alternate captain (along with Jaromir Jagr and Darius Kasparaitis) on a young Rangers team.

On July 3, 2006, Rucchin signed as a free agent with the Atlanta Thrashers. In his 47th game with the Thrashers, on March 6, 2007, he suffered a concussion on a hit by Ben Guite of the Colorado Avalanche. He was ruled out for the remainder of the season with post-concussion syndrome. Prior to the 2007–08 season, Rucchin failed a physical at training camp and sat out the final year of his contract effectively ending his professional career.

== Career statistics ==
=== Regular season and playoffs ===
			Regular season					Playoffs
Season	Team	League	GP	G	A	Pts	PIM	GP	G	A	Pts	PIM
1989–90	Thamesford Trojans	SOJHL	2	1	2	3	0	—	—	—	—	—
1990–91	University of Western Ontario	OUAA	34	13	16	29	14	—	—	—	—	—
1991–92	University of Western Ontario	OUAA	37	28	34	62	36	—	—	—	—	—
1992–93	University of Western Ontario	OUAA	34	22	26	48	16	—	—	—	—	—
1993–94	University of Western Ontario	OUAA	35	30	23	53	30	—	—	—	—	—
1994–95	San Diego Gulls	IHL	41	11	15	26	14	—	—	—	—	—
1994–95	Mighty Ducks of Anaheim	NHL	43	6	11	17	23	—	—	—	—	—
1995–96	Mighty Ducks of Anaheim	NHL	64	19	25	44	12	—	—	—	—	—
1996–97	Mighty Ducks of Anaheim	NHL	79	19	48	67	24	8	1	2	3	10
1997–98	Mighty Ducks of Anaheim	NHL	72	17	36	53	13	—	—	—	—	—
1998–99	Mighty Ducks of Anaheim	NHL	69	23	39	62	22	4	0	3	3	0
1999–2000	Mighty Ducks of Anaheim	NHL	71	19	38	57	16	—	—	—	—	—
2000–01	Mighty Ducks of Anaheim	NHL	16	3	5	8	0	—	—	—	—	—
2001–02	Mighty Ducks of Anaheim	NHL	38	7	16	23	6	—	—	—	—	—
2002–03	Mighty Ducks of Anaheim	NHL	82	20	38	58	12	21	7	3	10	2
2003–04	Mighty Ducks of Anaheim	NHL	82	20	23	43	12	—	—	—	—	—
2005–06	New York Rangers	NHL	72	13	23	36	10	4	1	0	1	0
2006–07	Atlanta Thrashers	NHL	47	5	16	21	14	—	—	—	—	—
NHL totals			735	171	318	489	164	37	9	8	17	12

=== International ===
Year	Team	Event	Result	GP	G	A	Pts	PIM
1998	Canada	WC	6th	6	1	2	3	2
Senior totals				6	1	2	3	2

== Personal life ==
Rucchin currently resides in London, Ontario, and frequently travels to Anaheim, California.

Awards and achievements
Preceded by Paul Kariya	Mighty Ducks of Anaheim captain 2003–04	Succeeded by Scott Niedermayer
