= Steve Guolla =

Canadian retired ice hockey player (born 1973)

- Born: March 15, 1973 (age 52) Scarborough, Ontario, Canada
- Height: 6 ft 0 in (183 cm)
- Weight: 190 lb (86 kg; 13 st 8 lb)
- Position: Centre
- Shot: Left
- Played for: San Jose Sharks; Tampa Bay Lightning; Atlanta Thrashers; New Jersey Devils
- NHL draft: 1994 NHL Supplemental Draft; Ottawa Senators
- Playing career: 1995–2011

Stephen K. Guolla (born March 15, 1973) is a Canadian former professional ice hockey player who played in the National Hockey League for the San Jose Sharks, Tampa Bay Lightning, Atlanta Thrashers and the New Jersey Devils. Guolla is a 2016 Michigan Amateur Hockey Association 30+ Recreational Division State Champion.

== Playing career ==
He was drafted 3rd overall by the Ottawa Senators in the 1994 NHL Supplemental Draft. In his NHL career, Guolla played 205 regular season games, scoring 40 goals and 46 assists for 86 points, collecting 60 penalty minutes. He has spent the past seasons playing in Europe with spells in Switzerland for Kloten, Germany for the Hannover Scorpions, and in Finland for HIFK. His last playing year was 2010–11 with Tappara in the Finnish SM-liiga.

== Career statistics ==
			Regular season					Playoffs
Season	Team	League	GP	G	A	Pts	PIM	GP	G	A	Pts	PIM
1990–91	Wexford Raiders	MetJHL	44	34	44	78	34	12	12	16	28	—
1991–92	Michigan State University	CCHA	36	4	9	13	8	—	—	—	—	—
1992–93	Michigan State University	CCHA	39	19	35	54	6	—	—	—	—	—
1993–94	Michigan State University	CCHA	41	23	46	69	16	—	—	—	—	—
1994–95	Michigan State University	CCHA	40	16	35	51	16	—	—	—	—	—
1995–96	P.E.I. Senators	AHL	72	32	48	80	28	3	0	0	0	0
1996–97	San Jose Sharks	NHL	43	13	8	21	14	—	—	—	—	—
1996–97	Kentucky Thoroughblades	AHL	34	22	22	44	10	4	2	1	3	0
1997–98	San Jose Sharks	NHL	7	1	1	2	0	—	—	—	—	—
1997–98	Kentucky Thoroughblades	AHL	69	37	63	100	45	3	0	0	0	0
1998–99	San Jose Sharks	NHL	14	2	2	4	6	—	—	—	—	—
1998–99	Kentucky Thoroughblades	AHL	53	29	47	76	33	—	—	—	—	—
1999–2000	Tampa Bay Lightning	NHL	46	6	10	16	11	—	—	—	—	—
1999–2000	Atlanta Thrashers	NHL	20	4	9	13	4	—	—	—	—	—
2000–01	Atlanta Thrashers	NHL	63	12	16	28	23	—	—	—	—	—
2001–02	Albany River Rats	AHL	68	25	35	60	27	—	—	—	—	—
2002–03	New Jersey Devils	NHL	12	2	0	2	2	—	—	—	—	—
2002–03	Albany River Rats	AHL	22	11	17	28	4	—	—	—	—	—
2003–04	Albany River Rats	AHL	7	2	3	5	0	—	—	—	—	—
2004–05	Kloten Flyers	NLA	12	4	9	13	4	—	—	—	—	—
2005–06	Hannover Scorpions	DEL	36	11	14	25	22	10	5	6	11	25
2006–07	HIFK	SM-l	49	11	45	56	44	5	0	0	0	29
2007–08	HIFK	SM-l	50	14	25	39	40	7	1	1	2	4
2008–09	HC Innsbruck	AUT	44	19	27	46	47	6	1	1	2	6
2009–10	Tappara	SM-l	27	8	15	23	24	—	—	—	—	—
2010–11	Tappara	SM-l	10	1	4	5	8	—	—	—	—	—
AHL totals			325	158	235	393	147	10	2	1	3	0
NHL totals			205	40	46	86	60	—	—	—	—	—
SM-l totals			136	34	89	123	116	12	1	1	2	33

== Championships ==
2016 Michigan Amateur Hockey Association 30+ Recreational Division State Champions

== Awards and honours ==
Award	Year
All-CCHA Second Team	1993–94
AHCA West Second-Team All-American	1993–94
CCHA All-Tournament Team	1994
