= Toni Koivisto =

Finnish ice hockey player

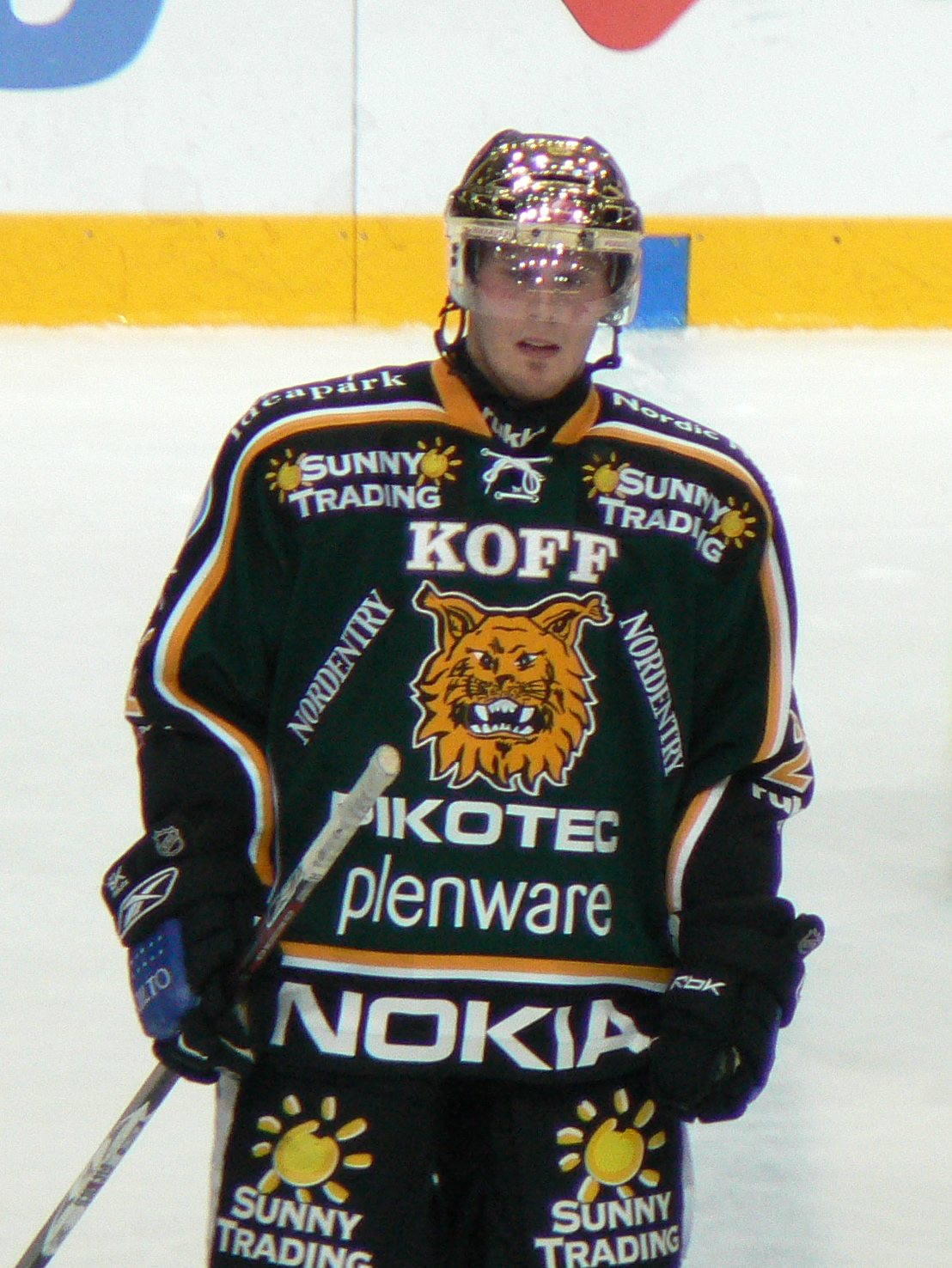
- Born: 5 November 1982 (age 43) Ylitornio, Finland
- Height: 6 ft 0 in (183 cm)
- Weight: 191 lb (87 kg; 13 st 9 lb)
- Position: Left wing
- Shot: Left
- Played for: Lukko; Ilves; Kärpät; Metallurg Magnitogorsk; Frölunda HC; Luleå HF
- NHL draft: 200th overall, 2001; Florida Panthers
- Playing career: 1999–2021

Toni Petteri Koivisto (born 5 November 1982 in Ylitornio) is a Finnish former professional ice hockey forward. His career spanned 21 seasons and was played in top leagues in Finland, Sweden, and Russia.

== Playing career ==
A native of Ylitornio, in Finnish Lapland, Koivisto moved to Rauma as a teenager in 1998 to play for Lukko, as northern Finland lacked an SM-liiga team at that time. After one year spent with the Lukko junior-A team, Koivisto debuted in the SM-liiga in the 1999–2000 season, although he still split his time between the adult and the junior teams. In 2000, Koivisto appeared in the U18 World Championships and won the gold medal with Team Finland. He also represented Finland in the 2001 and 2002 World Junior Championships, coming home with silver and bronze, respectively.

After six mediocre seasons with Lukko, Koivisto moved to Tampere to play for Ilves. In his first season there, he reached for the first time the 30 points mark, and the 40 points mark in the two following seasons.

In 2008, Koivisto returned to the north to play for Oulun Kärpät, the closest major club to Ylitornio, which had been promoted to SM-liiga in his absence. In Oulu, Koivisto rose to stardom, scoring 62 points in 58 games during both of his two seasons with Kärpät.

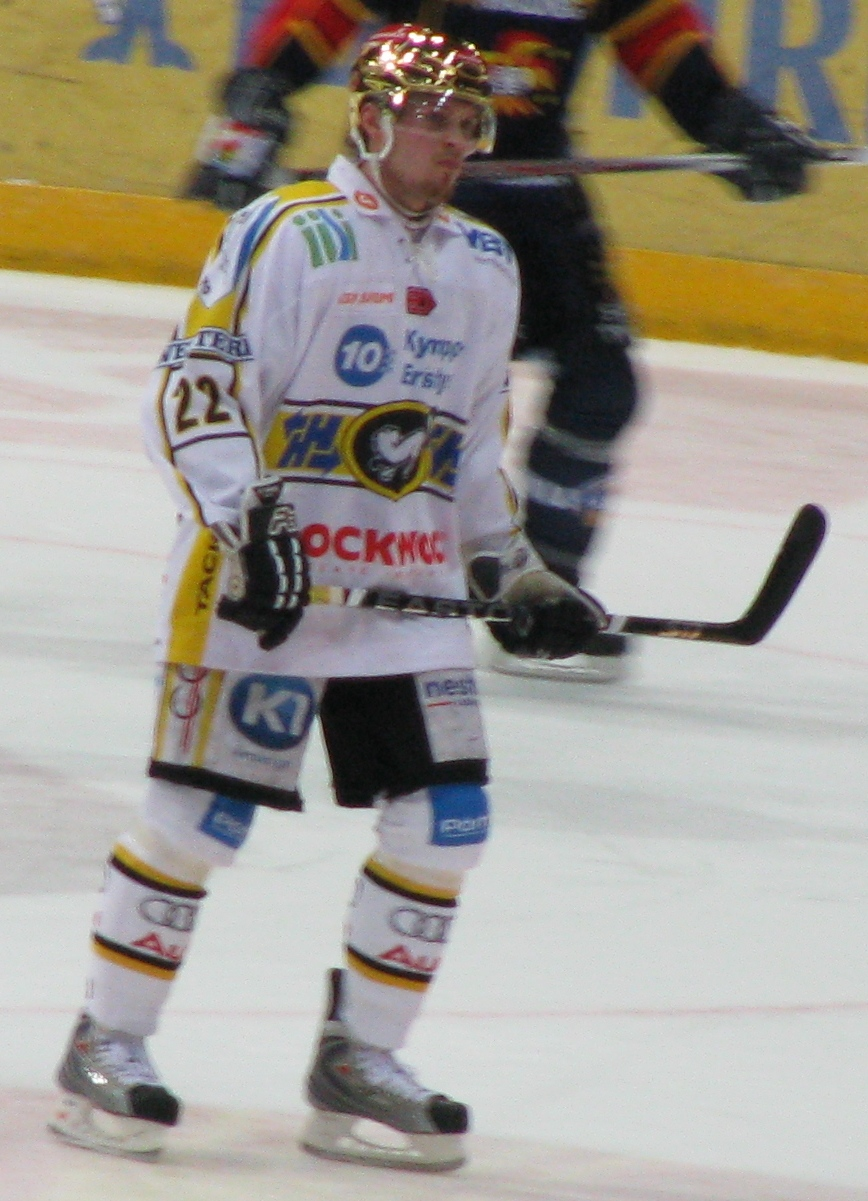
Toni Koivisto playing for Kärpät in 2009.

Koivisto signed a two-year contract with Metallurg Magnitogorsk of the Kontinental Hockey League (KHL) on 26 May 2009. In his first season with Metallurg in 2009–10, Koivisto struggled offensively scoring only 19 points in 51 games, he forwent his final year and signed a new two-year contract with Frölunda HC of the Swedish Elitserien (SEL) on 20 May 2010.

After scoring only 1 goal in the 2011–12 season's first 17 games, Frölunda and Koivisto decided to split apart on 31 October 2011. He subsequently signed a one-season contract with Luleå HF of the same league (Elitserien) on 6 November 2011, expiring after the end of the 2011–12 season.

== Career statistics ==
=== Regular season and playoffs ===
			Regular season					Playoffs
Season	Team	League	GP	G	A	Pts	PIM	GP	G	A	Pts	PIM
1998–99	Lukko	FIN U18	8	6	5	11	2	—	—	—	—	—
1998–99	Lukko	FIN U20	24	5	2	7	8	—	—	—	—	—
1999–2000	Lukko	FIN U18	3	1	1	2	8	—	—	—	—	—
1999–2000	Lukko	FIN U20	29	21	12	33	8	8	2	1	3	0
1999–2000	Lukko	SM-liiga	12	1	0	1	2	—	—	—	—	—
2000–01	Lukko	FIN U20	16	9	15	24	6	1	0	0	0	0
2000–01	Lukko	SM-liiga	47	5	1	6	6	2	0	0	0	0
2000–01	UJK	Mestis	2	0	0	0	0	—	—	—	—	—
2001–02	Lukko	FIN U20	6	7	3	10	2	—	—	—	—	—
2001–02	Lukko	SM-liiga	52	4	10	14	8	—	—	—	—	—
2002–03	Lukko	SM-liiga	56	7	6	13	16	—	—	—	—	—
2003–04	Lukko	SM-liiga	54	4	8	12	57	4	0	0	0	0
2004–05	Lukko	SM-liiga	56	17	10	27	16	9	1	2	3	2
2005–06	Ilves	SM-liiga	56	19	13	32	28	1	0	0	0	0
2006–07	Ilves	SM-liiga	56	21	20	41	16	7	4	4	8	0
2007–08	Ilves	SM-liiga	45	14	26	40	12	5	0	0	0	2
2008–09	Kärpät	SM-liiga	58	23	39	62	12	14	6	5	11	2
2009–10	Metallurg Magnitogorsk	KHL	51	11	8	19	16	8	1	1	2	2
2010–11	Frölunda HC	SEL	54	14	9	23	12	—	—	—	—	—
2011–12	Frölunda HC	SEL	17	1	0	1	6	—	—	—	—	—
2011–12	Luleå HF	SEL	35	9	8	17	0	5	2	3	5	0
2012–13	Luleå HF	SEL	50	10	16	26	12	15	2	3	5	0
2013–14	Lukko	Liiga	59	15	13	28	22	10	2	3	5	2
2014–15	Lukko	Liiga	58	15	17	32	6	14	5	5	10	8
2015–16	Lukko	Liiga	58	17	29	46	12	5	1	3	4	2
2016–17	Lukko	Liiga	54	11	27	38	22	—	—	—	—	—
2017–18	Lukko	Liiga	60	12	19	31	16	2	0	0	0	0
2018–19	Lukko	Liiga	58	18	11	29	16	7	1	2	3	4
2019–20	Lukko	Liiga	56	9	17	26	6	—	—	—	—	—
2020–21	Lukko	Liiga	49	8	7	15	14	10	1	1	2	0
Liiga totals			944	220	273	493	287	90	21	25	46	22
SEL totals			156	34	33	67	30	20	4	6	10	0

Medal record

Representing Finland

Ice hockey

World Junior Championships
Silver medal – second place	2001 Moscow	
Bronze medal – third place	2002 Pardubice	

IIHF U18 Championships
Gold medal – first place	2000 Kloten	

=== International ===
Year	Team	Event	GP	G	A	Pts	PIM
2000	Finland	WJC18	7	0	3	3	0
2001	Finland	WJC	7	0	1	1	0
2002	Finland	WJC	7	3	4	7	2
Junior totals			21	3	8	11	2
