= 1997–98 AHL season =

- League: American Hockey League
- Sport: Ice hockey

Regular season
- Macgregor Kilpatrick Trophy: Philadelphia Phantoms
- Season MVP: Steve Guolla
- Top scorer: Peter White

Playoffs
- Playoffs MVP: Mike Maneluk

Calder Cup
- Champions: Philadelphia Phantoms
- Runners-up: Saint John Flames

AHL seasons
- 1996–97 1998–99

The 1997–98 AHL season was the 62nd season of the American Hockey League. The AHL shifts teams in their divisions, and the Canadian division reverts to being named Atlantic division. The Northern conference is renamed the Eastern conference, and the Southern conference renamed the Western conference.

The league introduces three new trophies. The Macgregor Kilpatrick Trophy first awarded for the team which finishes in first place in the league during the regular season. The Yanick Dupre Memorial Award is given to the player who best exemplifies the spirit of community service. The Thomas Ebright Memorial Award honors an individual with outstanding career contributions to the AHL.

Eighteen teams played 80 games each in the schedule. The Philadelphia Phantoms repeated finishing first overall in the regular season, and won their first Calder Cup championship.

== Team changes ==
- The Binghamton Rangers move to Hartford, Connecticut, becoming the Hartford Wolf Pack, playing in the New England division.
- The Carolina Monarchs move to New Haven, Connecticut, becoming the Beast of New Haven, playing in the New England division.
- The Baltimore Bandits move to Cincinnati, becoming the Cincinnati Mighty Ducks, playing in the Mid-Atlantic division.
- The Portland Pirates switch divisions, from New England to Atlantic.
- The Hamilton Bulldogs switch divisions, from Canadian to Empire State.

== Final standings ==
- y– indicates team clinched division and a playoff spot
- x– indicates team clinched a playoff spot
- e– indicates team was eliminated from playoff contention

=== Eastern Conference ===
Atlantic Division	GP	W	L	T	OTL	Pts	GF	GA
y–Saint John Flames (CGY)	80	43	24	13	0	99	231	201
x–Fredericton Canadiens (LAK/MTL)	80	33	32	10	5	81	245	244
x–Portland Pirates (WSH)	80	33	33	12	2	80	241	247
x–St. John's Maple Leafs (TOR)	80	25	32	18	5	73	233	254

New England Division	GP	W	L	T	OTL	Pts	GF	GA
y–Springfield Falcons (PHX)	80	45	26	7	2	99	278	248
x–Hartford Wolf Pack (NYR)	80	43	24	12	1	99	272	227
x–Beast of New Haven (CAR/FLA)	80	38	33	7	2	85	256	239
x–Worcester IceCats (OTT/STL)	80	34	31	9	6	83	267	268
e–Providence Bruins (BOS)	80	19	49	7	5	50	211	301

=== Western Conference ===
Empire State Division	GP	W	L	T	OTL	Pts	GF	GA
y–Albany River Rats (NJD)	80	43	20	11	6	103	290	223
x–Hamilton Bulldogs (EDM)	80	36	22	17	5	94	264	242
x–Syracuse Crunch (PIT/VAN)	80	35	32	11	2	83	272	285
x–Adirondack Red Wings (DET/TBL)	80	31	37	9	3	74	245	275
x–Rochester Americans (BUF)	80	30	38	12	0	72	238	260

Mid-Atlantic Division	GP	W	L	T	OTL	Pts	GF	GA
y–Philadelphia Phantoms (PHI)	80	47	21	10	2	106	314	249
x–Hershey Bears (COL)	80	36	31	7	6	85	238	235
x–Kentucky Thoroughblades (NYI/SJS)	80	29	39	9	3	70	241	278
e–Cincinnati Mighty Ducks (ANA)	80	23	37	13	7	66	243	303

== Scoring leaders ==
Note: GP = Games played; G = Goals; A = Assists; Pts = Points; PIM = Penalty minutes

Player	Team	GP	G	A	Pts	PIM
Peter White	Philadelphia Phantoms	80	27	78	105	28
Bob Wren	Cincinnati Mighty Ducks	77	42	58	100	151
Steve Guolla	Kentucky Thoroughblades	69	37	63	100	45
Stacy Roest	Adirondack Red Wings	80	34	58	92	30
Danny Briere	Springfield Falcons	68	36	56	92	42
Craig Darby	Philadelphia Phantoms	77	42	45	87	34
Craig Reichert	Cincinnati Mighty Ducks	78	28	59	87	28
Brendan Morrison	Albany River Rats	72	35	49	84	44
Alexei Yegorov	Kentucky Thoroughblades	79	32	52	84	56

- complete list

== Calder Cup playoffs ==
Division Semifinals	Division Finals
A1	Saint John	3
A4	St. John's	1
A1	Saint John	4
Atlantic Division
A3	Portland	2
A2	Fredericton	1
A3	Portland	3
Eastern Conference
N1	Springfield	1
N4	Worcester	3
N4	Worcester	3
New England Division
N2	Hartford	4
N2	Hartford	3
N3	New Haven	0
E1	Albany	3
E4	Adirondack	0
E1	Albany	4
Empire State Division
E2	Hamilton	0
E2	Hamilton	3
E3	Syracuse	2
Western Conference
M1	Philadelphia	3
E5	Rochester	1
M1	Philadelphia	4
Mid-Atlantic Division
M2	Hershey	0
M2	Hershey	3
M3	Kentucky	0

Conference Finals
A1	Saint John	4
N2	Hartford	1
E1	Albany	2
M1	Philadelphia	4

Calder Cup Final
A1	Saint John	2
M1	Philadelphia	4

== All Star Classic ==
The 11th AHL All-Star Game was played on February 11, 1998, at the Onondaga War Memorial in Syracuse, New York. Team Canada defeated Team PlanetUSA 11–10. In the skills competition held the day before the All-Star Game, Team PlanetUSA won 13–8 over Team Canada.

== Trophy and award winners ==
=== Team awards ===
Calder Cup; Playoff champions:	Philadelphia Phantoms
Richard F. Canning Trophy; Eastern Conference playoff champions:	Saint John Flames
Robert W. Clarke Trophy; Western Conference playoff champions:	Philadelphia Phantoms
Macgregor Kilpatrick Trophy; Regular season champions, League:	Philadelphia Phantoms
Frank Mathers Trophy; Regular Season champions, Mid-Atlantic Division:	Philadelphia Phantoms
F. G. "Teddy" Oke Trophy; Regular Season champions, New England Division:	Springfield Falcons
Sam Pollock Trophy; Regular Season champions, Atlantic Division:	Saint John Flames
John D. Chick Trophy; Regular Season champions, Empire State Division:	Albany River Rats

=== Individual awards ===
Les Cunningham Award; Most valuable player:	Steve Guolla – Kentucky Thoroughblades
John B. Sollenberger Trophy; Top point scorer:	Peter White – Philadelphia Phantoms
Dudley "Red" Garrett Memorial Award; Rookie of the year:	Danny Briere – Springfield Falcons
Eddie Shore Award; Defenceman of the year:	Jamie Heward – Philadelphia Phantoms
Aldege "Baz" Bastien Memorial Award; Best Goaltender:	Scott Langkow – Springfield Falcons
Harry "Hap" Holmes Memorial Award; Lowest goals against average:	Jean-Sebastien Giguere & Tyler Moss – Saint John Flames
Louis A. R. Pieri Memorial Award; Coach of the year:	Bill Stewart – Saint John Flames
Fred T. Hunt Memorial Award; Sportsmanship / Perseverance:	Craig Charron – Rochester Americans
Yanick Dupre Memorial Award; Community Service Award:	John Jakopin – Beast of New Haven
Jack A. Butterfield Trophy; MVP of the playoffs:	Mike Maneluk – Philadelphia Phantoms

=== Other awards ===
James C. Hendy Memorial Award; Most outstanding executive:	Frank Miceli, Philadelphia Phantoms
Thomas Ebright Memorial Award; Career contributions:	Jack Butterfield
James H. Ellery Memorial Awards; Outstanding media coverage:	Brendan McCarthy, St. John's & Bill Ballou, Worcester, (newspaper); Lance McAllister, Cincinnati, (radio); Rich Coppola, Hartford / New Haven, (television)
Ken McKenzie Award; Outstanding marketing executive:	Chris Palin, Rochester Americans

== See also ==
- List of AHL seasons

Preceded by 1996–97 AHL season	AHL seasons	Succeeded by 1998–99 AHL season
