= Ronn Tomassoni =

American ice hockey player and coach

Biographical details
- Born: March 1958 (age 68); Eveleth, Minnesota, US

Playing career
- 1976–1980: Rensselaer
- Position: Right Wing

Coaching career (HC unless noted)
- 1982–1990: Harvard (assistant)
- 1990–1999: Harvard

Head coaching record
- Overall: 145-115-24 (.553)

Accomplishments and honors

Championships
- 1992 ECAC Hockey Champion; 1993 ECAC Hockey Champion; 1994 ECAC Hockey Champion; 1994 ECAC Hockey tournament champion

Ronn Tomassoni (born March 1958) is a retired American ice hockey player and coach. Tomassoni was part of the coaching staff at Harvard for 17 years in various capacities and helped the team with its only national title in 1989.

== Career ==
Ronn Tomassoni played for Rensselaer in the late 1970s, posting average numbers over four seasons. After graduating in 1980 Tomassoni continued his involvement with hockey by becoming an assistant coach for Bill Cleary at Harvard in 1982. Tomassoni's arrival coincided with the Crimson's return to prominence as they began to make the NCAA Tournament annually. As time went on Cleary began to rely on Tomassoni more heavily, promoting him to associate status and effectively turning over the recruiting responsibilities to him. Tomassoni was part of Harvard's national title team in 1989 and was named as head coach when Cleary became athletic director after the 1989-90 season.

The early years under Tomassoni were very good in Cambridge as Harvard won three consecutive regular season titles, an ECAC title and made it to the 1994 Frozen Four. After 1994, however, Tomassoni could not get Harvard to produce a winning season. He held onto the job for five seasons before deciding to resign after the 1998–99 season. Tomassoni returned to his native Minnesota afterwards, settling in Duluth.

== Career statistics ==
			Regular season					Playoffs
Season	Team	League	GP	G	A	Pts	PIM	GP	G	A	Pts	PIM
1976–77	Rensselaer	ECAC Hockey	24	3	7	10	12	—	—	—	—	—
1977–78	Rensselaer	ECAC Hockey	27	7	11	18	8	—	—	—	—	—
1978–79	Rensselaer	ECAC Hockey	13	4	6	10	12	—	—	—	—	—
1979–80	Rensselaer	ECAC Hockey	27	3	7	10	8	—	—	—	—	—
NCAA totals			84	17	31	48	40	—	—	—	—	—

== Head coaching record ==
Record table
Season	Team	Overall	Conference	Standing	Postseason
Harvard Crimson (ECAC Hockey) (1990–1999)
1990-91	Harvard	19-12-1	14-8-0	3rd	ECAC Semifinals
1991-92	Harvard	14-7-6	13-3-6	1st	ECAC Quarterfinals
1992-93	Harvard	22-6-3	16-3-3	1st	NCAA East regional quarterfinals
1993-94	Harvard	24-5-4	16-2-4	1st	NCAA Frozen Four
1994-95	Harvard	14-14-2	12-9-1	t-3rd	ECAC Quarterfinals
1995-96	Harvard	13-20-1	9-12-1	6th	ECAC Runner-Up
1996-97	Harvard	11-18-3	9-11-2	7th	ECAC Quarterfinals
1997-98	Harvard	14-17-2	10-11-1	5th	ECAC third-place game (win)
1998-99	Harvard	14-16-2	8-12-2	8th	ECAC first round
Harvard:		145-115-24	107-71-20		
Total:		145-115-24			
National champion Postseason invitational champion Conference regular season champion Conference regular season and conference tournament champion Division regular season champion Division regular season and conference tournament champion Conference tournament champion
